= The Liar and His Lover =

The Liar and His Lover may refer to:

- The Liar and His Lover (manga) (カノジョは嘘を愛しすぎてる Kanojo wa Uso o Aishisugiteru), Japan
- The Liar and His Lover (film) (カノジョは嘘を愛しすぎてる Kanojo wa Uso o Aishisugiteru), Japan
- The Liar and His Lover (TV series) (그녀는 거짓말을 너무 사랑해 geunyeo-neun geojismal-eul neomu salanghae), Korea 2017
