= List of Boku wa Imōto ni Koi o Suru chapters =

Cover of Boku wa Imōto ni Koi o Suru volume 1 as published by Shogakukan in Japan on May 26, 2003.

The chapters of the manga series Boku wa Imōto ni Koi o Suru were written and illustrated by Kotomi Aoki. Originally serialized in Shōjo Comic, the individual chapters were collected and published in ten tankōbon volumes by Shogakukan, with the first volume released on May 26, 2003; and the last volume was published on August 26, 2008. The story focuses on fraternal twins Yori and Iku, who fall in love with one another despite being siblings and struggle to deal with their illicit relationship.

The series is licensed for regional language releases in France by Soleil Productions under the English title Secret Sweetheart, in Spain by Editorial Ivrea, and in Taiwan by Ever Glory Publishing. The original volumes were also imported to the United States and sold as is by Borders and Waldenbooks bookstores in early 2005. In March 2008, to celebrate its 40th anniversary, Shōjo Comic posted free chapters of Boku wa Imōto ni Koi o Suru on its website, along with a new side-story.

A spin-off series, Boku no Hatsukoi o Kimi ni Sasagu (僕の初恋をキミに捧ぐ; lit. 'I Offer You My First Love'), began serialization in Shōjo Comic simultaneously in 2005. Focusing on Yori's upperclassmen Takuma Kakinouchi and his childhood sweetheart Mayu Taneda, the series ran until mid-2008. Shogakukan published the individual chapters across twelve tankōbon volumes, with the first released December 20, 2005, and the last on August 26, 2008.

== Volume list ==
=== Boku wa Imōto ni Koi o Suru ===
No.	Release date	ISBN
1	May 26, 2003	4-09-137839-0
1st Secret: Tonight We Are Committing A Taboo; 2nd Secret: Girlfriend; 3rd Secret: Fragrant Body, Fragrant Heart; 4th Secret: Secret of the Nursery; 5th Secret: Not Enough; 6th Secret: Exceeding A Childish Wish
Yori and Iku Yuki are twin brother and sister, during their childhood, Yuri used to tell their parents that he will marry Iku. Their parents blushed this off as an innocent childhood fantasy, Yori knew that his feelings were more than an innocent crush on his sister. When they are fifteen Yori has by now realised that he is deeply and hopelessly in love with Iku and is ashamed of it, due to that they share a bedroom. Yori starts to distance himself from Iku by being coldly toward her. Iku is hurt and shaken by his behaviour but tries to make him smile, one day while at school, Yori got into a fight when one of the students made fun of Iku. Then Tomoka kisonoki, Iku's best friend, comes to his and nurses him, in midst of that she kisses him and confess her love to him, and ask if she is good enough for him, he sees this as an opportunity to surpass his feelings for Iku, so he kisses her back and have sex with her at a hotel. However, this encounter does nothing to help him forget his lust for Iku.
2	August 23, 2003	4-09-137840-4
7th Secret: Lovers; 8th Secret: Impatience, Then Jealousy; 9th Secret: Although I Love You... It's Painful (1st Part); 10th Secret: Although I Love You... It's Painful (2nd Part); 11th Secret: Treacherous Consideration; 12th Secret: Iku's Counterattack
Tomoka mistakenly thinks that Yori reciprocates her feelings and begins to call him her boyfriend. Yori, however, decide to hide this from Iku so she won't be upset, he then tries a new strategy:go to an out-of-town high school. Days later Iku and Yori got into a fight after Iku spoke about her dreams of having a boyfriend and going out on dates, Yori got really mad and shouted at Iku to shut up, she does but starts crying, Yori kisses her, which shocks her, he then confesses his love for her, she rejects him because he is her brother, she sees the sadness on his face then she realises that, while she is uncertain if she loves him more than a brother, she may lose him by rejecting him, she kisses him back but feels uncomfortable, Yori notice it and tells her to wait till she is sure about her love for him.
3	November 26, 2003	4-09-138521-4
13th Secret: Yori's Counterattack; 14th Secret: The Flowers of Sin Bloom; 15th Secret: Graduation; 16th Secret: A Tearful Farewell; 17th Secret: Your Voice on the Phone; 18th Secret: On the Birthday Morning
Several days pass, with Iku slowly growing adjusted to Yori's advance, keeping their parents in the dark. Haruka Yano, Yori's best friend, immediately notice the twins' closeness but doesn't tell them. Iku continued to be torn by her guilt of committing twincest and by her desire to remain together with Yori.Her guilt, however, completely disappears when she finds out that Yori is planning to enroll to a new school and that he has been seeing Tomoka. She tries to have sex with Yori but rejects her because she still doesn't love him yet. The next day, she sees Tomoka clinging to Yori, Iku realizes that she has finally fallen in love with Yori, after confessing to him, they skip school and flee to a church, where they remember playing when they were little.They try to have sex in a church, but Iku tells him to stop because she feels that God is watching them, Yori agrees and go home. Soon after, during school, Tomoka talks with Iku and their friends about her first day with Yori, which angers Iku. Yori comes in and tells Tomoka that their relationship is over before leaving with Iku. Tomoka smiles while crying and doesn't understand why he suddenly broke up her. Someone mentions that Yori probably has someone else he likes, she quickly realize that that person is Iku. Iku fight with Yori over his indiscretion with Tomoka. He hugs her as she is trying to get away from him, when she sees him crying, she gives into her feelings and hugs him back. Later that day Iku has Yori meet up with her and tells him that she wants to make love to him now, which shocks but pleases him, they go to a hotel, when Iku is initially apprehensive, they finally have sex together for the first time. Yori is thrilled that Iku is finally his but feels guilty and ask for God to punish him only. Days later they graduate from junior high school and Iku realizes that Yori still plans to go to another high school. Yori tells Yano the truth of his relationship with Iku, which Yano already knew but ask why he is leaving. Yori says that he is torn between his desire to protect this relationship versus the obligations to destroy it. Yori tries to comfort Iku, who ask why he still wants to go, Yori says that he doesn't want to leave, but if he stays they can't be a normal couple. But if they were in another city, where no one else knows them, they can be a couple. Iku reluctantly agrees to let him go, with the promise of staying in touch.
4	February 26, 2004	4-09-138521-4
19th Secret: The Birthday Night; 20th Secret: I Love You; 21st Secret: New Encounters; 22nd Secret: Getting Closer; 23rd Secret: Proposal; 24th Secret: Declaration of Proclamation
Yori arrives at his new high school, and to his horror, he finds out that Tomoka has enrolled in the same school. She tries to make him take her back, but he rejects her, it doesn't seem to bother her. For their sixteen birthday, Yori and Iku receive cell phone, which makes it easier for them to stay in contact. Iku visit Yori as much as possible as he is allowed visit from outside of school. Yori be friends with Takuma Kakinouchi and his girlfriend Mayu Taneda, who acts as his confidants. For his birthday present for her, Yori gave Iku a diamond clover ring as a promise of eternal love. Separated from Yori at a time, Iku is placed in the care of Yano, who acts as her protector. Yano helps the twins see each other at school and even arranges for them to spend some time together. Yano tells Iku that he knows about the relationship and assures her that he will keep it a secret. As he spend more time with her, Yano slowly falls in love with Iku, Yori vows to never give Iku up, the two best friends have a friendly rivalry over Iku, who is oblivious to Yano's feelings. The twins'parents mistake Yano for Iku's boyfriend and take an instant liking to him, he tells them that they are not a couple. When he does tell Iku about his feelings for her, Iku rejects him because she is in love with Yori. Yori soon realize that Tomoka is determined to get revenge from him and Iku for breaking up with her. She has them get caught by fellow students in Yori's room several times in order to expel him, as girls are forbidden to enter the boys'dorms. When Yori get light punishment, she takes a cellphone picture of them kissing and threatens to send it to everyone they know if he doesn't sleep with her. When he appears to accept the deal, he delete the picture and tells her to leave him and Iku alone. However, Tomoka refuses to listen and continues with her plans to expel him.
5	May 26, 2004	4-09-138523-0
Some time later, while Yano is at Iku's house, her father comes home and happily tells her wife that he ran into their longtime friend Dr. Yuugo Mori, and has a daughter who is the same age with Yori and Iku, and promised to have Yori engaged to the girl. The twins'mother refuses this and ask about when he says that the girl is similar to Yori, this sounds suspicious to Yano, who tells Yori that he thinks that Iku might not be his sister. Yori rejects this possibility, but secretly hopes that it is true. When Iku sneaks into the school to visit Yori, Tomoka hires a group of classmate to rape Iku. Fortunately, Yori catches them and punishes them and Tomoka. The school principal decide to expel Yori for continuing to let Iku into his dorm. Iku is happy about the news, which annoys Tomoka and calls her stupid, Yori defends Iku from Tomoka's insults, and she threatens to tell his mother about the twincestuoas relationshiprelationship. He doesn't believe her, and the twins find out that their mother has overheard the conversation. Again, Yano lies and says that Tomoka was joking and that Iku is his girlfriend. Their mother doesn't believe them, but doesn't say it out of fear, and takes the twins home.
6	August 26, 2004	4-09-138524-9
7	November 26, 2004	4-09-138525-7
8	February 25, 2005	4-09-138526-5
9	May 26, 2005	4-09-138527-3
10	August 26, 2005	4-09-138528-1

=== Boku no Hatsukoi o Kimi ni Sasagu ===
No.	Release date	ISBN
1	December 20, 2005	4-09-130245-9
1st Fortune - Future; 2nd Fortune - 12 years old; 3rd Fortune - Happiness; 4th Fortune - Heart; 5th Fortune - Trigger
2	January 26, 2006	4-09-130305-6
6th Fortune - First Love's Storm; 7th Fortune - Meeting; 8th Fortune - The Punishment Game; 9th Fortune - Comparing Heights; 10th Fortune - Dreams; Appendix - Data Files
3	April 26, 2006	4-09-130409-5
11th Fortune - Lies; 12th Fortune - Close Friend; 13th Fortune - Second Anniversary of Death; 14th Fortune - Tears; 15th Fortune - Endurance
4	July 26, 2006	4-09-130530-X
16th Fortune - Getting Closer; 17th Fortune - Compassion; 18th Fortune - Trifled With; 19th Fortune - Resignation; 20th Fortune - Crossroads; 21st Fortune - Jealousy
5	October 26, 2006	4-09-130667-5
22nd Fortune - An Honest Heart; 23rd Fortune - First Death; 24th Fortune - Secret; 25th Fortune - The One You Love; 26th Fortune - Farewell; 27th Fortune - Growing Up
6	January 26, 2007	978-4-09-130820-7
28th Fortune - Impulses; 29th Fortune - Breaking Down; 30th Fortune - Ferris Wheel; 31st Fortune - Chance Meeting; 32nd Fortune - The Dormitory Leader's Ring; 33rd Fortune - Coward
7	April 26, 2007	978-4-09-131020-0
34th Fortune - Brushing Past Each Other; 35th Fortune - Confirmation; 36th Fortune - Love Letter; 37th Fortune - I'm Sorry
8	July 26, 2007	978-4-09-131130-6
9	October 26, 2007	978-4-09-131348-5
10	January 26, 2008	978-4-09-131537-3
11	April 26, 2008	978-4-09-131587-8
12	August 26, 2008	978-4-09-131844-2
