= I Give My First Love to You =

- Theatrical poster
- Directed by: Takehiko Shinjō
- Written by: Kenji Bando
- Based on: I Give My First Love to You by Kotomi Aoki
- Produced by: Mitsuru Komiyama; Mika Nakamura; Hiroyasu Murakami; Fumihiro Hirai
- Starring: Mao Inoue; Masaki Okada; Tetta Sugimoto
- Cinematography: Mitsuru Komiyama
- Edited by: Yoshifumi Fukazawa
- Music by: Yoshihiro Ike
- Production companies: NTV; Shogakukan Productions
- Distributed by: Toho
- Release date: 24 October 2009 (Japan)
- Running time: 122 minutes
- Country: Japan
- Language: Japanese
- Box office: $24,051,386

I Give My First Love to You (Japanese: 僕の初恋をキミに捧ぐ, Hepburn: Boku no Hatsukoi o Kimi ni Sasagu) is a 2009 Japanese film. It was based on a manga of the same name by Kotomi Aoki, and it was released on 24 October 2009 in Japanese cinemas. The story revolves around Takuma Kakinouchi, a boy who is told he will die before he is 20, and Mayu Taneda, a girl who is in love with him.

The film is directed by director Takehiko Shinjō, and stars newcomer actor Masaki Okada and actress Mao Inoue, who played the role of Makino Tsukushi in the television drama and film adaptation of Hana Yori Dango. The film's theme song was sung by Japanese singer Ken Hirai.

== Plot ==
The film began when Mayu and Takuma were children. They have been friends since they were eight years old. Takuma has heart disease and is treated by a cardiologist who happens to be Mayu's father. One day, Takuma and Mayu overhear that Takuma will not live past 20 due to his condition. However, their friendship grows, and Takuma becomes Mayu's, first love. When they are out playing in the fields, Takuma promises to marry Mayu when they turn 20.

Time passes, and Mayu and Takuma have grown up and are attending junior high school, but their love for each other remains unchanged. However, Takuma, who knows his days are numbered, wants to push away his feelings for Mayu and distance himself from Mayu because he cannot stand to see her cry or hurt her more than he already has. He promised himself that after his last day in junior high, he would leave Mayu. He decided to attend an elite high school, which Takuma thinks Mayu cannot enter.

To Takuma's surprise, Mayu went to that school and did well enough in the entrance examination to become the 1st year student body representative. She scolded Takuma before the school hall when she should have been making her welcome speech. She told Takuma that even if he wanted to abandon her, it would not happen in 100,000 years. Therefore, they became known to the school as lovers.

Mayu then meets Kou, who likes her and asks her to be his girlfriend. However, Mayu refuses. On the other hand, Takuma meets Teru, another patient with the same heart condition he had met in the past, and Mayu gets jealous when he spends a lot of time visiting her. Kou asked Takuma to give Mayu to him, as Takuma should spare Mayu from the pain when Takuma dies. Mayu and Takuma broke up briefly because Takuma granted Teru her wish of experiencing a kiss before she died. When Takuma visited Teru the next day, he discovered she had died.

Takuma then issued Kou a challenge- they would run a 100-meter race, with the loser backing off from Mayu. Kou accepts the challenge, but Takuma wins and goes to find Mayu for a date. That day, Kou left the school at the same time as Mayu and Takuma and was knocked down by an oncoming train. Then, Takuma was informed that he had a suitable heart donor.

Later, Mayu found out that the donor was the now brain-dead Kou, and tried to hide the fact from Takuma. However, Takuma eventually found out and refused the donation. At the same time, Kou's family saw that Kou had shed tears and decided that there might be a miracle, and they refused the donation. Mayu begged them many times, but they refused to budge, although Kou had registered as a heart donor.

Later, Takuma suffered a heart attack. He was rushed to the hospital, and the doctor did not give him much chance of living. In his sleep, Takuma prayed that he could have just a short time more to live, and he made a miraculous recovery and surprised Mayu. He brought Mayu on their "honeymoon," visiting many places. Finally, at the field where they first kissed, Takuma told Mayu that he was fortunate and happy with his life, handing over his lucky-charm 'will' to her that he had written when he was eight.

Upon their arrival back to the hospital, Takuma suffered another heart attack, and despite the doctor's best efforts, he died. Mayu went to the roof and opened his letter, which told everyone to be happy when he was gone. The film ended with Mayu borrowing the urn containing Takuma's ashes and going to a church for a "wedding," thus fulfilling their promise when they were young.

The ending scene is a flashback of the first time they met at the hospital when they were eight.

== Cast ==
- Mao Inoue played Mayu Taneda, the daughter of Takuma's doctor, Dr. Takahito Taneda
- Masaki Okada as Takuma Kakunouchi, who is suffering from heart disease
- Tetta Sugimoto as Minoru Kakinouchi, Takuma's father
- Yoko Moriguchi as Ryoko Kakinouchi, Takuma's mother
- Natsuki Harada as Teru Uehara, a fellow patient with the same disease as Takuma; she became friends with the 2 kids during one of Takuma's stays in the hospital
- Yoshihiko Hosoda as Kou Suzuya
- Keiko Horiuchi as Yoshimi Suzuya, Kou's mother
- Yuki Terada as Yoko Tamura, Sae's roommate and friend in high school
- Masataka Kubota as Ritsu Sugiyama, Takuma's roommate in high school
- Gaku Yamamoto as Ryujo Suzuya, Kou's grandfather
- Toru Nakamura as Dr. Takahito Taneda, Mayu's father and Takuma's doctor
- Sea Kumada as the young Mayu Taneda
- Kaito Kobayashi as the young Takuma Kakunouchi.

== Production ==
=== Development ===
The live-action film adaptation of the manga was first announced on 1 December 2008. The film was directed by the director Shinjo Takehiko, the director of Tada, Kimi o Aishiteru.

=== Pre-production ===
Mao Inoue, who previously played the lead Makino Tsukushi in Hana Yori Dango, was chosen to play Mayu in this film, starring alongside actor Okada Masaki.

=== Filming ===
The filming of the film started in March 2009, once lead actress Mao Inoue had graduated from Meiji University.

=== Post-production ===
The film's 90 second trailer was first posted on the film's official website on 1 September 2009.

=== Theme song ===
The theme song for this film is I Will Fall in Love with You (僕は君に恋をする, Boku wa kimi ni koi o suru). It was sung by Japanese pop singer Ken Hirai, and was produced by DefStar Records.

== Release ==
=== Cinema ===
I Give My First Love to You was first released in Japan on 24 October 2009. It was then released in Taiwan under the name of (Chinese: 獻給你，我的初戀) on 10 April 2010, and in South Korea on 5 August 2010 (as Korean: 내 첫사랑을 너에게 바친다) Within South-East Asia, the film was released in Thailand on 24 December 2009 as (Thai: เพราะหัวใจบอกรักได้ครั้งเดียว) and in Singapore on 20 October 2010.

=== Home video ===
The home video for I Give My First Love to You was released on 21 April 2010 in Blu-ray and DVD Region 2 formats.

== Reception ==
=== Critical reception ===
Pick 'n' Mix Flix describes the film as "a good old-fashioned tear-jerker that may appeal more to twenty-somethings but still was powerful enough to bring some moisture to my old eyes." and gave it a rating of 7 out of 10.

=== Box office ===
In Japan, this film debuted on 302 screens and earned $3.07 million, making it the highest-grossing film in Japan and 20th highest internationally that week. According to the Motion Picture Producers Association of Japan, I Give My First Love to You was the 17th highest grossing Japanese film of 2009 with a total gross of 2.15 billion yen.

=== Accolades ===
Masaki Okada won the award of the Newcomer of the Year at the 2010 Japanese Academy Awards for his role in I Give My First Love to You, Honokaa Boy, and A Pierrot. He was also the "Best Newcomer" at the 22nd Nikkan Sports Film Awards.

== See also ==
- List of 2009 box office number-one films in Japan
