= My Girlfriend Is the Man! =

2025 South Korean television series

- Promotional poster
- Hangul: 내 여자친구는 상남자
- RR: Nae yeoja chinguneun sangnamja
- MR: Nae yŏja ch'in'gunŭn sangnamja
- Genre: Romantic comedy
- Based on: My Girlfriend is the Man! by massstar
- Developed by: KBS Drama
- Written by: Lee Hae-na
- Directed by: Yoo Kwan-mo
- Starring: Yoon San-ha; Arin; Yoo Jung-hoo
- Country of origin: South Korea
- Original language: Korean
- No. of episodes: 12

Production
- Executive producers: Kim Sool-hak; Lee Woong-hee
- Producers: Lee Won-geun (KBS); Kwon Mi-kyung; Joo Bang-ok; Ji Young-ju; Kim Hoon; Eo Tae-kyung
- Running time: 60 minutes
- Production companies: Studio N Blossom Story; Play Grounds

Original release
- Network: KBS2
- Release: July 23 – August 28, 2025

My Girlfriend Is The Man! (Korean: 내 여자친구는 상남자) is a 2025 South Korean romantic comedy television series directed by Yoo Kwan-mo and written by Lee Hae-na, based on the Naver webtoon of the same title illustrated and written by massstar. Produced under Studio N, Blossom Story and Play Grounds, it starred Yoon San-ha, Arin, and Yoo Jung-hoo. It aired on KBS2 from July 23, to August 28, 2025, every Wednesday and Thursday at 21:50 (KST). It is also available for streaming on Viu and Rakuten Viki in selected regions.

Its tenth episode on August 21, 2025, drew a rating of 0.5%, the lowest ever for a drama airing in the prime time slot on a terrestrial television network, breaking the record of 0.7% set by Kick Kick Kick Kick (which subsequently moved to a late-night time slot and saw even lower ratings), Crushology 101 and Pump Up the Healthy Love earlier that year.

== Cast ==
- Yoon San-ha as Park Yoon-jae
- Arin as Kim Ji-eun
- Yoo Jung-hoo as Kim Ji-hun
- Chuu as Kang Min-joo
- Hur Hyun-jun as Lee Min-hyeok

== Production ==
=== Development ===
The series was commissioned by Studio N, with Yoo Kwan-mo serving as director, Lee Hae-na writing the screenplay, and Blossom Story and Play Grounds as co-producers.

=== Casting ===
In August 2024, the cast was confirmed to include Astro member Yoon San-ha, Oh My Girl member Arin, singer Chuu, and actor Yoo Jung-hoo.

=== Filming ===
The first script reading was held on August 28, 2024. Principal photography of the series commenced on September 12, 2024.

== Original soundtrack ==
=== Part 1 ===
Released on July 24, 2025
No.	Title	Artist	Length
1.	"Wandering Star"	Jung Soo-min	3:24
2.	"Open Your Eyes"	Jung Soo-min	3:11
3.	"Wandering Star (Inst.)"	Jung Soo-min	03:24
4.	"Open Your Eyes (Inst.)"	Jung Soo-min	03:11

=== Part 2 ===
Released on July 31, 2025
No.	Title	Artist	Length
1.	"Lovey Dovey"	Yoon Sanha (Astro) & Arin	3:12
2.	"Lovey Dovey (Inst.)"	Yoon Sanha (Astro) & Arin	3:12

=== Part 3 ===
Released on August 6, 2025
No.	Title	Artist	Length
1.	"Days of Youth"	Seo Ja-yeong	2:50
2.	"Days of Youth (Inst.)"	Seo Ja-yeong	2:50

=== Part 4 ===
Released on August 7, 2025
No.	Title	Artist	Length
1.	"I See You"	more	4:08
2.	"I See You (Inst.)"	more	4:08

=== Part 5 ===
Released on August 14, 2025
No.	Title	Artist	Length
1.	"Star"	Chuu	4:27
2.	"Star (Inst.)"	Chuu	4:27

== Release ==
The series premiered on KBS2 on July 23, 2025, and aired on a Wednesday–Thursday timeslot at 21:50 (KST).

== Reception ==
iMBC gave the series a two-star rating out of three.

=== Ratings ===
Average TV viewership ratings (Nationwide)
Ep.	Original broadcast date	Average audience share (Nielsen Korea)
1	July 23, 2025	1.7% (28th)
2	July 24, 2025	1.1% (37th)
3	July 30, 2025	1.4% (31st)
4	July 31, 2025	1.2% (36th)
5	August 6, 2025	1.0% (39th)
6	August 7, 2025	1.1% (38th)
7	August 13, 2025	0.9% (42nd)
8	August 14, 2025	1.1% (36th)
9	August 20, 2025	0.9% (41st)
10	August 21, 2025	0.5% (67th)
11	August 27, 2025	1.1% (34th)
12	August 28, 2025	1.1% (36th)
Average		1.1%
In the table above, the blue numbers represent the lowest ratings and the red numbers represent the highest ratings.
