= Yoo Jung-hoo =

South Korean actor (born 1997)

- Born: South Korea
- Occupation: Actor
- Years active: 2022–present
- Agent: Artist Company

Korean name
- Hangul: 유정후
- RR: Yu Jeonghu
- MR: Yu Chŏnghu

Yoo Jung-hoo (Korean: 유정후; born 1997) is a South Korean actor

== Filmography ==
=== Film ===
Year	Title	Role	Ref.
2025	Somebody		

=== Television series ===
Year	Title	Role	Ref.
2023	Bitch X Rich	Lee So-mang	
2023	Durian's Affair	Dan Deun-myeong	
2024	Who Is She	Park Jun	
2025	My Girlfriend Is the Man!	Kim Ji-hun	

=== Web series ===
Year	Title	Role	Note(s)	Ref.
2022	Bad Girlfriend	Kwak Hyun-woo	Debut acting	
2022	New Love Playlist	Park Do-yoon		
