= Kanojo wa Uso o Aishisugiteru =

Japanese manga series

- First tankōbon volume cover

カノジョは嘘を愛しすぎてる
- Manga
- Written by: Kotomi Aoki
- Published by: Shogakukan
- Magazine: Cheese!
- Original run: May 24, 2009 – February 24, 2017
- Volumes: 22
- Adaptations
- The Liar and His Lover (2013 film, Japan); The Liar and His Lover (2017 TV series, South Korea)

Kanojo wa Uso o Aishisugiteru (カノジョは嘘を愛しすぎてる; 'She Loves Lies Too Much'), also known as The Liar and His Lover, is a Japanese manga series written and illustrated by Kotomi Aoki. As of 2013, it has over three million copies in circulation. On November 23, 2016, it was announced that the manga would end in the next four chapters.

== Synopsis ==
Aki is a genius musician, composing songs for a famous rock band (Crude Play) under the famous producer Takagi. He was a member before their debut but he withdrew after he found out that Shinya was better at playing his part as his ghost musician. His life was all about music or related to music. His ex-girlfriend was the famous singer Mari, who was also cheating on him with Takagi. He felt that he was being manipulated by Takagi, went into depression, and desperately tried to find something that he could hold outside of music. Through fate, he met Riko, a teenage girl who fell in love with him at first sight. Despite not being in love with her, he started to date her on a whim. He lied to her about his own identity, his past relationship, and his own feelings. Unknown to him, Riko was actually a talented singer with a unique voice which was scouted by Takagi just recently.

== Characters ==
- Aki Ogasawara, a genius music producer and former bassist of Crude Play. He loves music since he was a kid and starts a band with his friends: Shun, Kaoru and, Teppei. However, when they are going into their debut with Takagi, a music producer, he realizes that their supposed debut CD music is played by professional musicians instead of their own. He loses his own confidence and changes place with Shinya as Crude Play Bassist. Since then he starts to become Crude Play's music composer. Along the way, Takagi introduces him to Mari, a beautiful and popular singer. Both of them end up dating and Aki composes music for Mari too. They break up when Aki finally finds out that Mari has been sleeping with Takagi too. By chance, he meets with Riko. In the beginning, he does not have any feelings toward Riko. He just picks her up on his own whim. They start to date because Aki wants to find something outside of music. Aki lies about his true identity, while Riko is also under a misconception that he is a NEET and a virgin. He also told Riko that he hates a girl who sings. Aki does not know that Riko is a talented singer with a unique voice. Because of this, he misses his chance to be her producer to Shinya which he regrets later since he falls in love with her voice as well with Riko herself.
- Riko Koeda, a high school student who possesses a gifted voice. She falls in love with Aki at first sight. Riko can be naive sometimes but she is not stupid. She is a big fan of Crude Play. She gets scouted by Takagi and forms a band with her friend Yuichi and Sota as Mush & Co, and Shinya becomes her producer. Since Aki tells her that he hates girls who sing, she becomes incredibly worried about it. It also becomes her main motivation to separate work with her love life as she decides not to sing Aki's song which he makes especially for her much to Aki's dismay. Along the way, she finds out about Aki's lies and his past relationship with Mari. She constantly gets jealous and insecure of Aki's love, Mari's beauty, and talent. Despite her childish look, she is actually very popular as Shinya, Yuichi and, Shibaken are in love with her.
- Shun Sakaguchi, vocalist and guitarist of "Crude Play". He is Aki's childhood friend. He is very mature, smooth talker, charming and the leader of Crude Play. He is blessed with a handsome look and wealth, but he is pretty down-to-earth. He cherishes his friendship with Aki and actually was really disappointed when Aki withdrew from the band. He has always been waiting for Aki to come back as Crude Play bassist. As a person, he has a gift to understand people and act accordingly to the situation. Shun is well aware of Aki's relationship with Riko and always gives Aki good pieces of advice related to Riko when he really needs it. He has unrequited love with Miwako but decides not to pursue her since she does not feel the same way as him.
- Shinya Shinohara, bassist of "Crude Play". He is a very talented bassist. He was supposed to be Aki's ghost player for the music recording but became Crude Play's bassist instead in Aki's place. As a result, Shinya never feels that he belongs in Crude Play. He has a lot of passion for composing music. He hates Aki but at the same time, he loves Aki's music. He wants to produce music of his owns and is delighted to have Riko as his singer. He gets really insecure about his self worth since he feels that Aki's music for Riko is way better than his. He also falls in love with Riko which makes him more competitive with Aki.
- Kouki Mizuta as Kaoru Ono, guitarist of "Crude Play" He is a good friend of Aki, Shun, and Teppei since high school. Even though he is not talented, he truly loves music. He practices really hard to be able to hopefully play his part by his own, without any ghost musician.
- Koudai Asaka as Teppei Yazaki, drummer of "Crude Play" The same as Kaoru, he practices really hard to improve his drum play.
- Ryo Yoshizawa as Yuichi Kimijima, guitarist of "Mush & Co." Riko's childhood friend and leader of the band. He has unrequited love for Riko since they were kids. He hates Aki and sees him as a useless man (since he does not know his true identity). He loves music due to Riko's influence. He also struggles about his performance since Takagi pushes him and Sota as an accessory for Riko (Takagi uses other musicians to play their parts). However, Yuichi does not want to give up. He works really hard to become worthy as Riko's band partner and love interest.
- Yuki Morinaga as Sota Yamazaki, drummer of "Mush & Co." He is Yuichi and Riko childhood friend. He looks ordinary and fat, but he is the most mature, kindest and, wisest compare to his band members. He knows Yuichi's feelings for Riko but very supportive not only for Yuichi but also Riko's feeling. He loves music due to Riko's influence. Just like Yuichi, he works really hard to improve himself.
- Saki Aibu as Mari, Aki's ex-girlfriend and a famous singer. She was in a relationship with Aki, but she also slept with Takagi. When she was young, her mother slept around and relied on men to survive. From this experience, Mari learns to use her beauty and body to manipulate men. She is very obsessive about beauty and youthful look because of her past. Takagi also mentions that Mari is actually very insecure about herself and the only thing that he can do to support her is to sleep with her too. Even though she insists to continue her relationship with Takagi, she does not want to give up on Aki. Not only because she truly loves him, but also because she is dependent on Aki's music. She is jealous of Riko's talent as well as Riko's growing relationship with Aki.
- Takashi Sorimachi as Soichiro Takagi, music producer, and Aki's rival. He loves music more than anything. Takagi is willing to give up anything for music to the point of neglecting his own family and having an affair with Mari (which he thinks as his job, not due to love). He is very manipulative. In order for Aki's to grow as a composer, he introduces Mari to Aki. Takagi knows very well that Aki will definitely be smitten by Mari and it will influence him to be able to make great love songs. In the same way, he lets Aki knows about his true nature relationship with Mari so that Aki is able to make heartbreak songs as well. Takagi is not jealous of Aki since his relationship with Mari has no feeling. He also pushes Aki in several occasion to get back with Mari, because Mari needs both Takagi and Aki to survive. He was the one who finds and scouts Mari, Crude Play and Mush & Co.
- Mitsuki Tanimura as Miwako Nagahama, Takagi's assistant. In the beginning, she has unrequited love for Aki. She knows Aki and Shun since high school. Aki was the reason why she pursues a career in music. She later becomes Riko and Shinya manager. She later falls in love with Shinya and becomes jealous of Riko. She is a virgin and has no love experience. Takagi tells Miwako that the reason why she is still single is that she has no courage to pursue her love as well as her uptight attitude.

== Reception ==
The manga won the award for best shōjo manga at the 59th Shogakukan Manga Awards.

== Adaptations ==
- In 2013, a live-action film starring Takeru Satoh and Sakurako Ohara was released.
- In 2017, a South Korean television series starring Lee Hyun-woo and Joy aired on tvN. It was first announced on December 26, 2016.
