= Lee Seo-won =

South Korean actor

- 이서원
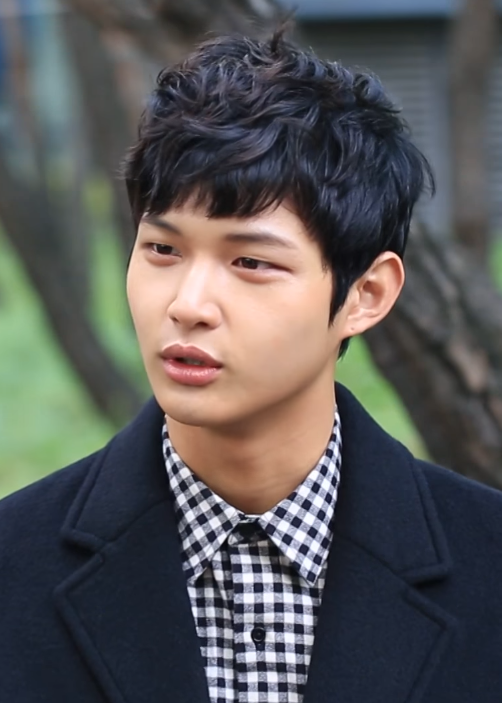
- Lee in November 2016
- Born: February 17, 1997 (age 29); Gunsan, North Jeolla Province, South Korea
- Education: Sejong University
- Occupation: Actor
- Years active: 2015–2018

Korean name
- Hangul: 이서원
- Hanja: 李曙原
- RR: I Seowon
- MR: I Sŏwŏn

Lee Seo-won (Korean: 이서원; born February 17, 1997) is a South Korean former actor.

== Career ==
Lee debuted in JTBC television series The Awl in 2015. He initially garnered attention for his portrayal of a college student and Suzy's younger brother in the melodrama Uncontrollably Fond.

In 2017 he was cast as a main character in the drama The Liar and His Lover. The director of the drama Kim Jin-min predicted Lee could potentially be the next Park Bo-gum and Song Joong-ki who are from the same agency as Lee and would follow their steps. Next, he was cast as an oriental doctor in the medical romance drama Hospital Ship.

== Personal life ==
=== Education ===
Lee graduated from high school in 2015. He took a two-year break before entering Sejong University as a film major in 2017.

=== Military enlistment ===
On November 22, 2018, Lee's agency announced that Lee enlisted in the military on November 20, to fulfill mandatory military service.

=== Sexual harassment and intimidation charges ===
On May 16, 2018, news broke that Lee was charged with sexual harassment and threatening a female celebrity with a weapon. Lee was charged and investigated on April 8, before the police sent his case to the prosecution with a recommendation of indictment. According to authorities, Lee was drinking with said female celebrity when he attempted to kiss her and make physical contact, but was rejected. After continuous attempts for physical contact, the victim called her boyfriend to ask for help, which caused Lee to threaten her with a knife. Lee remained silent and continued filming the 2018 television series About Time and program Music Bank for 40 days without informing the production staff that he was under investigation. However, when news broke out, Lee, who was supposed to appear in About Time, was pulled out and his scenes were re-filmed using another actor. He was also removed from his role as the host of Music Bank.

On May 24, 2018, Lee apologized for his actions while visiting the Seoul District Public Prosecutors’ Office for interrogation. On July 12, the first day of trial at the Seoul Eastern District Court, Lee pleaded guilty to charges of sexual harassment and criminal threats. Lee's attorney stated that they acknowledge guilt since Lee's DNA was detected on the victim's ear and he was apprehended by police while holding a knife. However, he also stated that Lee was "unable to remember anything from the incident" and was "not in control of his body due to intoxication", and requested a lenient sentence due to Lee's "diminished mental and physical faculties" cause by intoxication. The second trial, which was on October 6, 2018, was held privately at the request of the victim. During the hearing, one witness, the victim's boyfriend who saw Lee swinging the knife, was called to the stand for testimony and to undergo questioning. The victim testified in court on third trial that was held on October 25. The fourth trial was scheduled for November 22, however, Lee enlisted for his military service and planned to attend his trial through the military court with the status of a soldier. The courts postponed his fourth hearing to be held in January 2019, but the Seoul Eastern District Court transferred the case to the military court on February 27. In the first trial, Lee was sentenced to one year in prison suspended for two years of probation. He has since appealed the sentence and the case is being reviewed in the High Military Court.

== Filmography ==
=== Film ===
Year	Title	Role	Notes	Ref.
2016	Knocking on the Door to Your Heart	Kim Jin-kyu	Short film	
2017	Man of Will	Kim Chun-dong		

=== Television series ===
Year	Title	Role	Network	Notes	Ref.
2015	The Awl	Lee Soo-in (young)	JTBC		
2016	Uncontrollably Fond	Noh Jik	KBS2		
2017	The Liar and His Lover	Seo Chan-young	tvN		
2017	Hospital Ship	Kim Jae-gul	MBC		
2017	Last Minute Romance	Dong-joon	JTBC	Web series	

=== Television program ===
Year	Title	Role	Network	Notes	Ref.
2016–2018	Music Bank	Host	KBS2	Removed due to criminal charges	

== Awards and nominations ==
Year	Award	Category	Nominated work	Result	Ref.
2017	36th MBC Drama Awards	Best New Actor	Hospital Ship	Nominated	
