= Lee Elijah =

South Korean actress (born 1990)

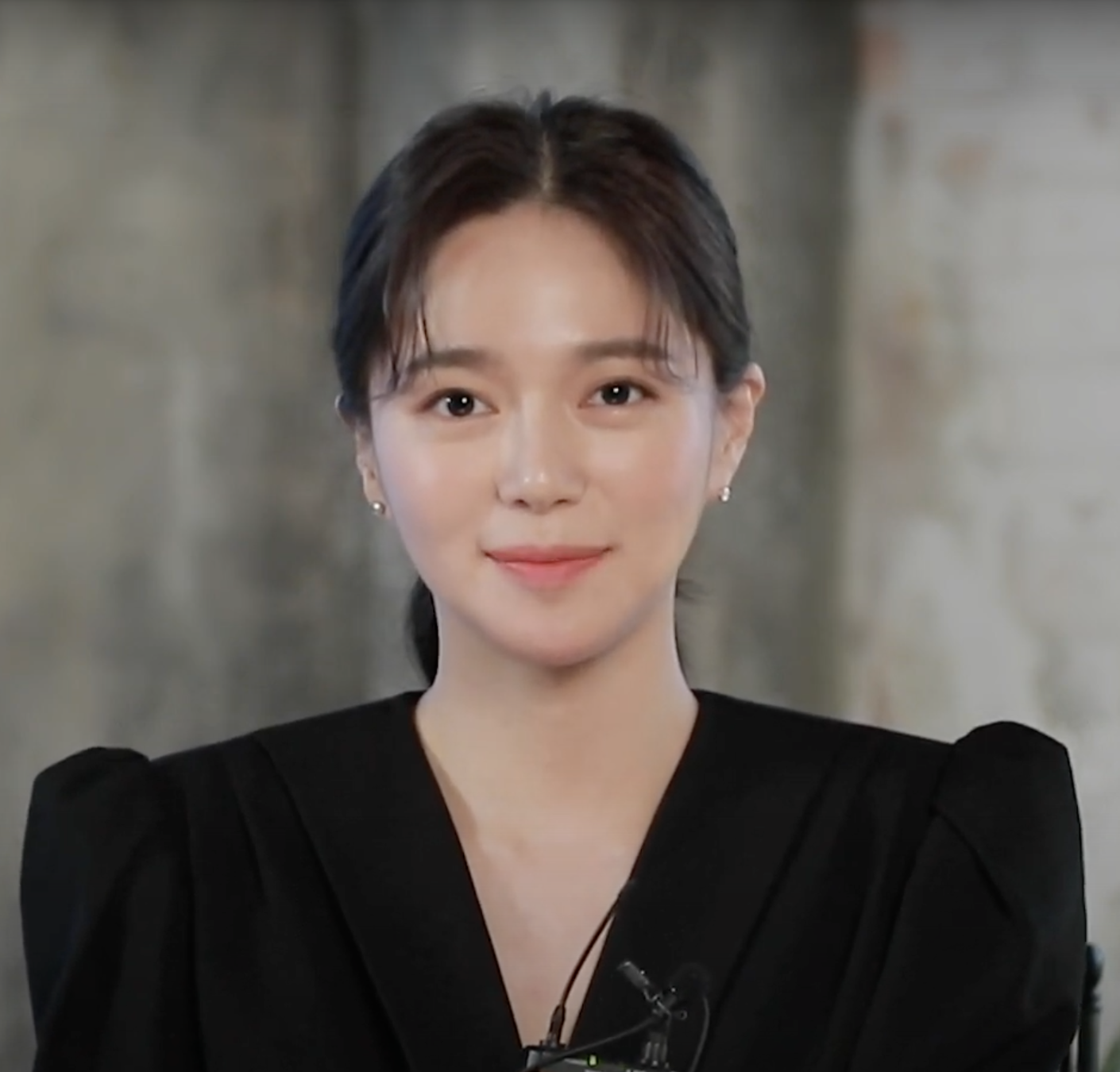
- Lee in December 2019
- Born: February 19, 1990 (age 36); Changwon, South Korea
- Education: Seoul Institute of the Arts (Department of Acting)
- Occupation: Actress
- Years active: 2013–present
- Agent: Ungbin ENS

Korean name
- Hangul: 이엘리야
- RR: I Elriya
- MR: I Elliya

Lee Elijah (Korean: 이엘리야; born February 19, 1990) is a South Korean actress. She debuted with leading role in tvN's Basketball (2013). After several years in major supporting roles, she was cast as lead again with JTBC's The Good Detective (2020).

== Early life and education ==
Lee Elijah was born into a Protestant family. Her parents named her after the prophet Elijah in the Old Testament. Lee learned horse riding, taekwondo, ballet, vocal music when she was a child. She studied acting at the Seoul Institute of the Arts.

== Career ==
Lee Elijah debuted as the female lead in 2013 period sport series, Basketball. After her debut, for several years she did major supporting roles in diverse genres. Some of her notable performances came in 2018–2019, including Ms. Hammurabi, The Last Empress, and Chief of Staff.

Lee made her film debut with a starring role for 2019 romantic comedy My Bossy Girl. In 2020, Lee returned to lead role in series with crime procedural The Good Detective. On November 15, 2021, it was announced that Lee's contract with King Kong by Starship has ended. In March 2022, Lee signed with new agency Ungbin ENS.

== Filmography ==
=== Film ===
Year	Title	Role	Ref.
2019	My Bossy Girl	Hye-jin	
2022	A Man of Reason	Min-seo	

=== Television series ===
Year	Title	Role	Notes	Ref.
2013	Basketball	Choi Shin-young		
2014	Wonderful Days	Kim Ma-ri		
2015	The Return of Hwang Geum-bok	Baek Ye-ryung		
2015	Heroes	Park Hae-mil		
2016	Uncontrollably Fond	Kim Yoo-na	Special appearance	
2017	Fight for My Way	Park Hye-ran		
2018	Children of a Lesser God	Baek A-hyeon		
2018	Ms. Hammurabi	Lee Do-yeon		
2018	The Last Empress	Min Yoo-ra		
2019	Chief of Staff	Yoon Hye-won		
2020	The Good Detective	Jin Seo-kyung	Season 1	
2021	Delayed Justice	Yoon Hye-won	Cameo	
2023	Decoy	Na Yeon-seon	Part 1–2	

=== Television shows ===
Year	Title	Role	Notes	Ref.
2017	King of Mask Singer	Contestant	as "Secret Garden" (episodes 127–128)	

=== Web series ===
Year	Title	Role	Notes	Ref.
2026	Lady Boss Returns	Choi Joo-yeon	Forthcoming short-form drama on Kanta	

=== Music video appearances ===
Year	Song title	Artist	Ref.
2013	"Hate"	Baek Ji-young	
2013	"Going Crazy"	GB9	

== Awards and nominations ==
Name of the award ceremony, year presented, category, nominee of the award, and the result of the nomination
Award ceremony	Year	Category	Nominee / Work	Result	Ref.
APAN Star Awards	2021	Best Supporting Actress	The Good Detective; Chief of Staff	Nominated	
Blue Dragon Series Awards	2023	Best Supporting Actress	Bait	Nominated	
SBS Drama Awards	2015	New Star Award	The Return of Hwang Geum-bok	Won	
SBS Drama Awards	2018	Excellence Award, Actress in a Wednesday-Thursday Drama	The Last Empress	Nominated	
