= Yeon Min-ji =

South Korean actress and singer (born 1984)

- Born: Lee Min-ji; May 14, 1984 (age 42); South Korea
- Other name: Minji
- Education: Duksung Women's University
- Occupations: Actress; singer
- Years active: 2002–present
- Agent: Onion Management Group (O.M.G)

Korean name
- Hangul: 이민지
- RR: I Minji
- MR: I Minji

Stage name
- Hangul: 연민지
- RR: Yeon Minji
- MR: Yŏn Minji

Lee Min-ji (Korean: 이민지; born May 14, 1984), better known as stage name Yeon Min-ji, is a South Korean actress and singer. She is also active in Japanese entertainment under the mononym Minji (ミンジ).

== Filmography ==
=== Film ===
Year	Title	Role	Notes	Ref.
2008	252: Signal of Life	Kim Soo-min		
2009	Lush Life	Sona		
2010	Swing Me Again	Ha-young/Yuriko Noda		
TBA	PIT	Anna	Short Film	

=== Television series ===
Year	Title	Role	Notes	Ref.
2010	Honcho Azumi 2	Han Yoo-na (guest, episode 11)	Guest, episode 11	
2010	Athena: Goddess of War	Jessica		
2012	Feast of the Gods	Jane		
2013	When a Man Falls in Love	Jin Song-yeon		
2013	Basketball	Commissioner's wife		
2014	Love & Secret	Go Yoon-yi		
2018	Secret Mother			
2018	Mr. Sunshine	Geisha		
2018	Big Forest	Stephanie Zeggal		
2019	Perfume	Song Min-hee		
2020–2021	Color Rush	Yoo Yi-rang	Season 1–2	
2021	The Penthouse: War in Life 2	Reunion alumna	Cameo (Episode 3)	
2022	Gold Mask	Seo Yu-ra		
2022	Woori the Virgin	Choi Mi-ae		

=== Music video appearances ===
Year	Song title	Artist
2002	"Your Wedding"	Shinhwa
2005	"Isolated Ones, Left Foot Forward!"	Drunken Tiger
2006	"Shout"	Lee Seung-chul

== Discography ==
Album information	Track listing
Love Alive: Single; Released: December 3, 2008; Label:	Track listing: 1. LOVE ALIVE; 2. I Believe I Believe; 3. LOVE ALIVE (Winter Acoustic Version); 4. LOVE ALIVE (Inst.); 5. I Believe I Believe (Inst.)
So Faraway: Track from Swing Me Again OST; Released: November 10, 2010; Label:	Track listing: 01. So Faraway
