= Baek Eun-hye =

South Korean actress (born 1986)

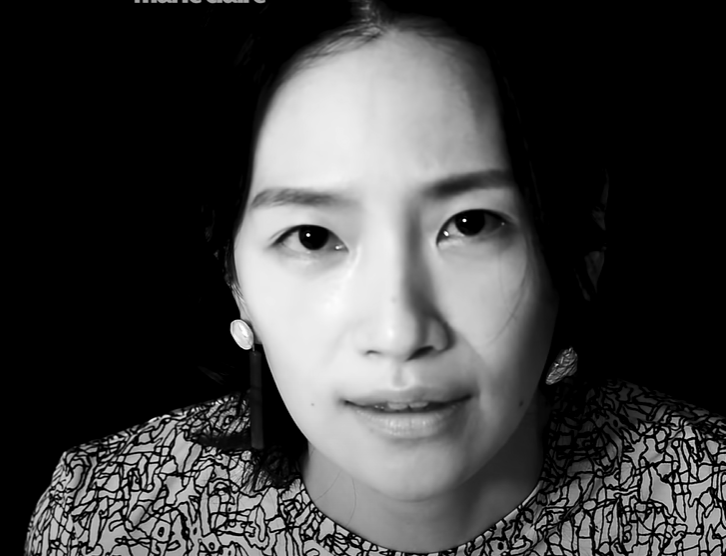
- Baek in 2021
- Born: 1 September 1986 (age 40); Seoul, South Korea
- Education: Sookmyung Women's University (Department of Vocal Music)
- Occupations: Actress; model; singer
- Years active: 2007–present
- Agent: Big Boss Entertainment
- Known for: Nokdu Flower; No, Thank You; The Good Detective

Korean name
- Hangul: 백은혜
- RR: Baek Eunhye
- MR: Paek Ŭnhye

Baek Eun-hye (Korean: 백은혜; born 1 September 1986) is a South Korean actress, model and singer. She is known for her roles in dramas such as Nokdu Flower, What's Wrong with Secretary Kim, No, Thank You and The Good Detective.

== Early life and education ==
She was born September 1, 1986, in South Korea. She completed her studies from Sookmyung Women's University, she studied vocal music.

== Career ==
After she graduated in 2007, she joined Big Boss Entertainment. She made her debut as an actress in 2007. After that, she has appeared in several television dramas including, Nokdu Flower, No, Thank You, The Good Detective, Black Dog: Being A Teacher and What's Wrong with Secretary Kim.

In 2024, she appeared in drama Family by Choice.

== Personal life ==
On June 5, 2026, Big Boss Entertainment confirmed that Baek would be marrying actor Lee Jun-u.

== Filmography ==
=== Film ===
Year	Title	Role	Notes	Ref.
2021	A Year-End Medley	Hotel Manager of the Maids 'Emros Team	TVING Film	

=== Television series ===
Year	Title	Role	Ref.
2010	My Sister's March	Yoo Jung-suk	
2015	Six Flying Dragons	Yuan Dynasty stronghold dancer	
2015	Songgot: The Piercer	Contract employee	
2017	Oh, the Mysterious	Nurse	
2018	Drama Special: "The Long Goodbye"	Eom Gwi-jung	
2018	What's Wrong with Secretary Kim	Kim Pil-nam	
2019	Touch Your Heart	Insurance agent	
2019	Nokdu Flower	Baek Yi-hwa	
2019	When the Camellia Blooms	Sung-hee	
2019	Black Dog: Being A Teacher	Song Chan-hee	
2020	The Good Detective	Kang Eun-hee	
2020	No, Thank You	Jung Hye-ri	
2021	Joseon Exorcist	Minister Ha's daughter-in-law	
2021	Sell Your Haunted House	Hong Mi-jin	
2022	No, Thank You 2	Jung Hye-ri	
2022	A Year-End Medley: Extended Version	Hotel Emross manager	
2022	JTBC Drama Festa: "The Woman Who Lives in Misfortune"	Jung Soo-yeon	
2023	The First Responders	Woo Sam-soon	
2024	Family by Choice	Kang Seo Hyeon	
2025	When the Stars Gossip	Na Min-jung	
