= Color Rush (web series) =

South Korean web series

- Promotional poster
- Hangul: 컬러 러쉬
- RR: Keolleo reoswi
- MR: K'ŏllŏ rŏshwi
- Genre: BL; Romance; Mystery
- Starring: Yoo Jun; Hur Hyun-jun; Hyuk
- Country of origin: South Korea
- Original language: Korean
- No. of seasons: 2
- No. of episodes: 16

Production
- Camera setup: Single camera
- Running time: 15 minutes
- Production companies: Storywiz; Convergence TV

Original release
- Release: December 30, 2020 – 2022

Color Rush (Korean: 컬러 러쉬) is a South Korean mystery romance web series starring Yoo Jun and Hur Hyun-jun. Based on the eponymous boys' love novel, it tells the story of Yeon Woo (played by Yoo), who can only see the world in varying tones of gray, and Yoo Han (played by Hur), with whom Yeon Woo experiences a "color rush" – suddenly being able to see color. It premiered in South Korea on Seezn, Wavve, Naver Series on, and Skylife VOD, and outside South Korea on Viki, Viu, and Line TV on December 30, 2020, and concluded on January 21, 2021. On October 28, 2021, it was confirmed for a second season.

== Season 1 ==
Yeon Woo is a monochrome person (also known as a "mono"), who sees the world only through different shades of gray, white and black due to his total color blindness (achromatopsia). He is aware that other colors exist, but has never experienced them for himself, nor does he care to do so. However, each mono has a fated person known as a "probe", and Yeon Woo's life changes forever when he meets Yoo Han, his destined lover, and experiences his first "color rush" — a phenomenon that causes the mono to suddenly see colors through intense experiences. Terrified that he would become obsessed with Yoo Han due to the latter's ability to make him see colors, Yeon Woo tries to avoid Yoo Han. But why does Yoo Han insist on approaching him? While all this is happening, his aunt Yi Rang searches for her sister who went missing 4 years ago.

== Season 2 ==
Choi Yeon Woo is a high school student and a "mono", a person who sees the world through different shades of gray, white, dull and lifeless black. But for each mono there is a "probe", a kind of soulmate that allows the mono to see the world in vivid colors. Yeon Woo's probe is a boy named Yoo Han, and the two developed a beautiful friendship that blossomed into romance. As their relationship intensifies, mysterious events unfold that suddenly become very unpleasant for Yeon Woo, who eventually finds out that Yoo Han is missing. Yeon Woo vows to do whatever it takes to locate both his probe and his mother, who is also missing. A classmate named Se Hyun learns of Yeon Woo's search and decides to help and protect him, and a close friendship develops between the two students. But Se Hyun is hiding a secret, and Yeon Woo may be about to find out the truth.

Meanwhile, Yeon Woo is not alone. Other monos are closer than he thinks, including a female mono who is also searching for her own probe, and a TV producer who hopes to get to the bottom of the mystery of the probe and the mono.

== Cast ==
- Hur Hyun-jun as Go Yoo Han
- Yoo Jun as Choi Yeon Woo
- Hyuk as Kim Sehyun
- Yeon Min-ji as Yoo Yi-rang

== Original soundtrack ==
The soundtrack of the first season of the series was released on January 8, 2021.

Color Rush (Original Television Soundtrack)
No.	Title	Lyrics	Music	Artist	Length
1.	"Color Rush"	Kim Wook; Tim H Lee; Woo Dong-hoon	Kim Wook; Tim H Lee; Susan	Ryu Su-jeong (Lovelyz)	3:28
2.	"I'll Find You" (너를 찾을게)	Hansol Choi; Wook Kim	Hansol Choi; Wook Kim	Kwon Sun-il (Urban Zakapa)	4:15
3.	"Color Rush" (Inst.)		Kim Wook; Tim H Lee; Susan		3:28
4.	"I'll Find You" (Inst.)		Hansol Choi; Wook Kim		4:15
Total length:					15:26
