= No, Thank You =

South Korean web series

- Promotional poster
- Hangul: 며느라기
- RR: Myeoneuragi
- MR: Myŏnŭragi
- Genre: Drama
- Based on: Myeoneuragi by Soo Shin-ji
- Developed by: Kakao M
- Screenplay by: Lee Yoo-jung (season 1); You Song-yee (season 2)
- Directed by: Lee Kwang-young
- Starring: Park Ha-sun; Kwon Yul; Moon Hee-kyung
- No. of episodes: 12

Production
- Executive producers: Moon Sung-ho; Lee Young-seok
- Running time: 19–25 minutes
- Production companies: SBS Mobidic; Take 2 Media Group

Original release
- Network: KakaoTV
- Release: November 21, 2020 – February 6, 2021

No, Thank You (Korean: 며느라기; RR: Myeoneuragi (Note: The term was invented by the webtoon writer to describe the period when a daughter-in-law (myeoneuri) tries to impress her new family: her in-laws.)) is a South Korean web series starring Park Ha-sun, Kwon Yul and Moon Hee-kyung. Based on the webtoon Myeoneuragi by Soo Shin-ji, it was released through KakaoTV from November 21, 2020 to February 6, 2021.

The second season premiered on January 8, 2022.

== Synopsis ==
No, Thank You tells the story of Min Sa-rin, a daughter-in-law who tries to live through South Korea's patriarchal society and do what is expected of her from her in-laws.

== Cast ==
=== Main ===
- Park Ha-sun as Min Sa-rin
- Kwon Yul as Mu Gu-young
- Moon Hee-kyung as Park Ki-dong

=== Supporting ===
- Kim Jong-goo as Mu Nam-chun
- Jo Wan-ki as Moo Gu-il
- Baek Eun-hye as Jung Hye-rin
- Choi Yoon-ra as Mu Mi-young
- Choi Tae-hwan as Kim Chul-soo
- Jin So-yeon as Yeon-soo
- Yoon Seul as Hye-ri
- Ha Seong-kwang as Mu Nam-hae

== Episodes ==
No.	Title	Directed by	Written by	Original release date
1	"Would You Like to Receive Your Daughter-in-Law?"; Transliteration: "Myeoneulagileul bad-eusigessseubnikka?" (Korean: 며느라기를 받으시겠습니까?)	Lee Kwang-young	Lee Yoo-jung	November 21, 2020
2	"Everyone Was Too"; Transliteration: "Dadeul neomuhaessda" (Korean: 다들 너무했다)	Lee Kwang-young	Lee Yoo-jung	November 28, 2020
3	"A Daughter-in-Law Like a Daughter"; Transliteration: "Ttal gat-eun myeoneuli" (Korean: 딸 같은 며느리)	Lee Kwang-young	Lee Yoo-jung	December 5, 2020
4	"Can You Help Me With Your Grandfather?"; Transliteration: "Nine hal-abeoji jesande dowajundaguyo?" (Korean: 니네 할아버지 제산데 도와준다구요?)	Lee Kwang-young	Lee Yoo-jung	December 12, 2020
5	"Can't You Just Stay That Day?"; Transliteration: "Geunalman geuleohge iss-eojumyeon an doelkka?" (Korean: 그날만 그렇게 있어주면 안 될까?)	Lee Kwang-young	Lee Yoo-jung	December 19, 2020
6	"That's Why I Hate Working with Guys"; Transliteration: "Ilaeseo namjadeulhago ilhagiga silh-eo" (Korean: 이래서 남자들하고 일하기가 싫어)	Lee Kwang-young	Lee Yoo-jung	December 26, 2020
7	"Spinning Around Again"; Transliteration: "Dasi dolgo dolgo dolgo" (Korean: 다시 돌고 돌고 돌고)	Lee Kwang-young	Lee Yoo-jung	January 2, 2021
8	"What Is Chuseok?"; Transliteration: "Chuseog-ilan mueos-inga?" (Korean: 추석이란 무엇인가?)	Lee Kwang-young	Lee Yoo-jung	January 9, 2021
9	"People in the House, People Outside the House"; Transliteration: "Jib an-ui salam, jib bakk-ui salam" (Korean: 집 안의 사람, 집 밖의 사람)	Lee Kwang-young	Lee Yoo-jung	January 16, 2021
10	"The Sinner Has a Daughter"; Transliteration: "Ttal gajin joein" (Korean: 딸 가진 죄인)	Lee Kwang-young	Lee Yoo-jung	January 23, 2021
11	"How Did We Become So Different?"; Transliteration: "Eojjeoda uli ileohge dallajyeoss-eulkka?" (Korean: 어쩌다 우리 이렇게 달라졌을까?)	Lee Kwang-young	Lee Yoo-jung	January 30, 2021
12	"Would You Like to Receive Your Daughter-in-Law?"; Transliteration: "Myeoneulagileul bad-eusigessseubnikka?" (Korean: 며느라기를 받으시겠습니까?)	Lee Kwang-young	Lee Yoo-jung	February 6, 2021

== Original soundtrack ==
=== Part 1 ===
Released on December 19, 2020
No.	Title	Artist	Length
1.	"Island" (섬)	Sunwoo Jung-a	4:36
2.	"Island" (Inst.)		4:36
Total length:			9:12

=== Part 2 ===
Released on January 2, 2021
No.	Title	Artist	Length
1.	"How Is It?" (어때요)	Hello Ga-Young (Note: Original song by Vanilla Acoustic.)	3:02
2.	"How Is It?" (Inst.)		3:02
Total length:			6:04

=== Part 3 ===
Released on January 16, 2021
No.	Title	Artist	Length
1.	"My Lonely Days" (이렇게 난 오늘을 살아)	Yoo Hee	3:32
2.	"My Lonely Days" (Inst.)		3:32
Total length:			7:04

== Reception ==
No, Thank You is the first KakaoTV series to rank on Wavve's top-10 drama list.
