= Lee Da-yeon =

South Korean actress (born 2003)

- Born: September 18, 2003 (age 21); Incheon, South Korea
- Education: Seoul Institute of the Arts - Performing Arts
- Occupation: Actress
- Years active: 2019–present
- Agent: King Kong by Starship

Korean name
- Hangul: 이다연
- RR: I Dayeon
- MR: I Tayŏn

Lee Da-yeon (Korean: 이다연; born September 18, 2003) is a South Korean actress. She first became known through the 2023 television series Durian's Affair.

== Career ==
Lee Da-yeon started her acting career with teenage counterpart roles of the main cast actresses in several television series. She debuted as the younger version of Im Soo-jung's role in the 2019 tvN's workplace romance Search: WWW, followed by 2020 KBS2's family weekend Homemade Love Story and 2022 JTBC's slice-of-life drama Thirty-Nine as the teen period of Jeon In-hwa and Kim Ji-hyun's characters.

In 2023, Lee receives her first attention with TV Chosun's fantasy melodrama Durian's Affair written by an established screenwriter Im Sung-han.

== Filmography ==
=== Television series ===
| Year | Title | Role | Notes | Ref. |
|---|---|---|---|---|
| 2019 | Search: WWW | young Bae Ta-mi (Tammy) | | |
| 2020 | Homemade Love Story | young Lee Soon-jung | | |
| 2021 | Melancholia | Kyung Soo-young | Extra | |
| 2022 | Thirty-Nine | young Jang Joo-hee | | |
| 2023 | Durian's Affair | Kim So-jeo | | |
| 2024 | Nothing Uncovered | Lee Na-ri | | |
| 2025 | My Troublesome Star | young Go Hee-young | | |

=== Web series ===
| Year | Title | Role | Notes | Ref. |
|---|---|---|---|---|
| 2020 | No Going Back Romance | Han So-dam | | |
