= List of 2009 box office number-one films in Japan =

This is a list of films which have placed number one at the weekend box office in Japan during 2009.

== Number-one films ==
†	This implies the highest-grossing movie of the year.

#	Weekend End Date	Film	Total Weekend Gross	Notes
1	January 4, 2009	WALL-E	$15,073,432	
2	January 11, 2009	WALL-E	$9,882,788	
3	January 18, 2009	Kansen rettô	$8,857,548	
4	January 25, 2009	Quantum of Solace	$15,034,863	
5	February 1, 2009	20-seiki shônen: Dai 2 shô - Saigo no kibô	$21,305,497	
6	February 8, 2009	20-seiki shônen: Dai 2 shô - Saigo no kibô	$16,252,108	
7	February 15, 2009	The Curious Case of Benjamin Button	$14,888,272	
8	February 22, 2009	Changeling	$13,764,903	
9	March 1, 2009	Departures	$15,863,975	
10	March 8, 2009	Yatterman	$18,318,553	
11	March 15, 2009	Yatterman	$16,778,439	
12	March 22, 2009	Yatterman	$17,053,246	
13	March 29, 2009	Yatterman	$16,526,479	
14	April 5, 2009	Drop	$11,806,211	
15	April 12, 2009	Red Cliff: Part II	$18,639,508	
16	April 19, 2009	Detective Conan: The Raven Chaser	$22,439,477	
17	April 26, 2009	Detective Conan: The Raven Chaser	$18,166,774	
18	May 3, 2009	Detective Conan: The Raven Chaser	$13,284,222	
19	May 10, 2009	April Bride	$16,935,570	
20	May 17, 2009	Angels & Demons	$16,935,570	
21	May 24, 2009	Angels & Demons	$12,736,015	
22	May 31, 2009	Rookies †	$11,094,214	
23	June 7, 2009	Rookies †	$9,005,159	
24	June 14, 2009	Rookies †	$21,180,923	
25	June 21, 2009	Transformers: Revenge of the Fallen	$34,986,200	
26	June 28, 2009	Evangelion: 2.0 You Can (Not) Advance	$15,371,100	
27	July 5, 2009	Evangelion: 2.0 You Can (Not) Advance	$12,701,920	
28	July 12, 2009	Gokusen: The Movie	$19,061,500	
29	July 19, 2009	Harry Potter and the Half-Blood Prince	$45,690,000	
30	July 26, 2009	Harry Potter and the Half-Blood Prince	$23,182,089	
31	August 2, 2009	Harry Potter and the Half-Blood Prince	$20,625,700	
32	August 9, 2009	Kamen Rider Decade: All Riders vs. Dai-Shocker	$20,907,109	
33	August 16, 2009	Night at the Museum: Battle of the Smithsonian	$23,758,913	
34	August 23, 2009	Night at the Museum: Battle of the Smithsonian	$15,532,617	
35	August 30, 2009	20th Century Boys: The Last Chapter – Our Flag	$19,408,015	
36	September 6, 2009	20th Century Boys: The Last Chapter – Our Flag	$15,623,127	
37	September 13, 2009	20th Century Boys: The Last Chapter – Our Flag	$14,024,205	
38	September 20, 2009	20th Century Boys: The Last Chapter – Our Flag	$13,589,280	
39	September 27, 2009	20th Century Boys: The Last Chapter – Our Flag	$8,250,399	
40	October 4, 2009	20th Century Boys: The Last Chapter – Our Flag	$6,021,091	
41	October 11, 2009	Kaiji	$12,960,184	
42	October 18, 2009	Kaiji	$10,612,988	
43	October 25, 2009	I Give My First Love to You	$13,053,035	
44	November 1, 2009	Michael Jackson's This Is It	$19,278,617	
45	November 8, 2009	Michael Jackson's This Is It	$13,145,746	
46	November 15, 2009	A Christmas Carol	$16,975,529	
47	November 22, 2009	2012	$21,099,245	
48	November 29, 2009	2012	$13,234,262	
49	December 6, 2009	Up	$16,045,531	
50	December 13, 2009	One Piece Film: Strong World	$32,964,679 (record)	
51	December 20, 2009	One Piece Film: Strong World	$23,791,245	
52	December 27, 2009	Avatar	$16,554,031	

== Highest-grossing films ==
International film Japanese film

Highest-grossing films of 2009
Rank	Title	Gross
1	Rookies	¥8.55 billion ($91.38 million)
2	Harry Potter and the Half-Blood Prince	¥8.00 billion ($85.5 million)
3	Red Cliff: Part II	¥5.55 billion ($59.31 million)
4	Michael Jackson's This Is It	¥5.20 billion ($55.57 million)
5	Pokémon: Arceus and the Jewel of Life	¥4.67 billion ($49.91 million)
6	20th Century Boys: Chapter 3	¥4.41 billion ($47.13 million)
7	Evangelion: 2.0 You Can (Not) Advance	¥4.00 billion ($42.75 million)
7	WALL-E	¥4.00 billion ($42.75 million)
9	2012	¥3.80 billion ($40.61 million)
10	Amalfi: Rewards of the Goddess	¥3.65 billion ($39.01 million)
