= Chief of Staff (TV series) =

2019 South Korean television series

- Promotional poster for season 1
- Hangul: 보좌관
- Lit.: Aide
- RR: Bojwagwan
- MR: Pojwagwan
- Genre: Political
- Developed by: JTBC
- Written by: Lee Dae-il
- Directed by: Kwak Jung-hwan
- Starring: Lee Jung-jae; Shin Min-a; Lee Elijah; Kim Dong-jun
- Composer: Choi Cheol-ho
- Country of origin: South Korea
- Original language: Korean
- No. of seasons: 2
- No. of episodes: 20

Production
- Executive producer: Ham Young-hoon
- Producers: Kim Woo-taek; Jang Kyung-ik
- Running time: 60 minutes
- Production company: Studio&NEW

Original release
- Network: JTBC; Netflix
- Release: June 14 – December 10, 2019

Chief of Staff (Korean: 보좌관; RR: Bojwagwan) is a 2019 South Korean television series starring Lee Jung-jae, Shin Min-a, Lee Elijah, and Kim Dong-jun. The first season aired on JTBC from June 14 to July 13, 2019. The second season aired from November 11 to December 10, 2019.

== Series overview ==
| Season | Episodes | Originally released | | Time slot |
| Season | Episodes | First released | Last released | Time slot |
|---|---|---|---|---|
| 1 | 10 | June 14, 2019 | July 13, 2019 | Friday and Saturday at 23:00 (KST) |
| 2 | 10 | November 11, 2019 | December 10, 2019 | Monday and Tuesday at 21:30 (KST) |

== Synopsis ==
The story of politicians and their aides who try to climb up the political ladder.

== Cast ==
=== Main ===
- Lee Jung-jae as Jang Tae-joon
- Shin Min-a as Kang Seon-yeong
- Lee Elijah as Yoon Hye-won
- Kim Dong-jun as Han Do-kyeong
- Jung Jin-young as Lee Seong-min (season 1)
- Kim Kap-soo as Song Hee-seop
- Jung Woong-in as Oh Won-sik
- Im Won-hee as Go Seok-man (season 1)
- Jung Man-sik as Choi Kyung-chul (season 2)
- Park Hyo-joo as Lee Ji-eun (season 2)
- Jo Bok-rae as Young Jong-yeol (season 2)

=== Supporting ===
- Kim Hong-pa as Jo Gap-yeong
- Lee Chul-min as Kim Hyung-do
- Ko In-beom as Seong Yeong-gi
- Yoo Sung-joo as Lee Chang-jin
- Jeon Jin-ki as Lee Gwi-dong
- Jun Seung-bin as Kim Jong-wook
- Do Eun-bi as No Da-jeong
- Park Myung-shin as Yeo Sook-hee
- Kim Seo-ha as Lee In-soo
- Kim Ik-tae as Lee Sang-gook
- Nam Sung-jin as Ahn Hyeon-min
- Park Geon as Seo Hyung-chul
- Lee Sun-won as Lee Hyung-sa
- Yoo Ha-bok as Park Jong-gil
- Ji So-yeon as Kim Mi-jin
- Lee Yong-yi as Yu's grandmother

=== Special appearances ===
==== Season 1 ====
- Kim Eung-soo as Jang Choon-bae (Ep. 1, 7)
- Lee Soon-won as Detective Lee Hyeong-bae (Ep. 1, 3, 8-9)
- Cha Sun-bae as Minister of Justice (Ep. 2-4)
- Jang Jae-ho as reporter Sung Woo (Ep. 2)
- Lee Joon-hee member of Jo Gap-young's party (Ep. 2)
- Lee Han-wi as Chief Presidential Secretary (Ep. 4-5, 7)
- Lee Yong-yi as merchant Ok Ja (Ep. 5-6, 10)
- Go In-bum as chairman Sung Young-gi (Ep. 8)
- Lee Jong-goo as barber (Ep. 9)
- Seo Wang-seok as detective (Ep. 9)

==== Season 2 ====
- Go In-bum as chairman Sung Young-gi
- Kim Eung-soo as Jang Choon-bae (Ep. 2–4)
- Park Myung-shin as Yeo Sook-hee
- Kim Ik-tae as Lee Sang-guk (Ep. 1, 5)
- Lee Soon-won as Detective Lee Hyeong-bae (Ep. 3, 5)
- Jang Jae-ho as reporter Sung Woo
- Lee Joon-hee member of Jo Gap-young's party (Ep. 1)
- Lee Yong-yi as merchant Ok Ja (Ep. 3–4)
- Lee Han-wi as Chief Presidential Secretary (Ep. 5)
- Park Ji-yoon (Ep. 4)
- Jung Myung-joon as prosecutor Sim
- Lee Min-ji
- Hong Seo-joon (Ep. 2)
- Choi Jung-woo
- Jung Dong-gyu (Ep. 6)
- Park Geon as prosecutor (Ep. 1, 5)
- Ok Joo-ri (Ep. 5)
- Ma Si-hwan as prosecutor Yoon
- Sung Ian as reporter
- Sung Dong-il (Ep. 10)

== Production ==
- The first script reading took place on March 26, 2019 in Nonhyeon-dong, Seoul, South Korea.
- The series is Lee Jung-jae's small-screen comeback after ten years.

== Original soundtrack ==
=== Season 1 ===
Chief of Staff: People who Make the World OST

Soundtrack album by Various Artists
- Released: 2019
- Genre: Soundtrack
- Languages: Korean; English
- Label: Music&NEW

==== Part 1 ====
Released on June 14, 2019
| No. | Title | Lyrics | Music | Artist | Length |
|---|---|---|---|---|---|
| 1. | "Rainfall" | Hana | Kim Young-sung; Seo Jae-ha | Chen (EXO) | 3:21 |
| 2. | "Rainfall" (Inst.) | | Kim Young-sung; Seo Jae-ha | | 3:21 |
| Total length: | | | | | 6:42 |

==== Part 2 ====
Released on June 21, 2019
| No. | Title | Lyrics | Music | Artist | Length |
|---|---|---|---|---|---|
| 1. | "Black Sky" | Hana | Jung Sung-min; Shin Ji-hoo (Postman) | Kim Jae-hwan | 3:31 |
| 2. | "Black Sky" (Inst.) | | Jung Sung-min; Shin Ji-hoo (Postman) | | 3:31 |
| Total length: | | | | | 7:02 |

=== Season 2 ===
Chief of Staff 2: People who Make the World OST

Soundtrack album by Various Artists
- Released: 2019
- Genre: Soundtrack
- Languages: Korean; English
- Label: Music&NEW

==== Part 1 ====
Released on November 11, 2019
| No. | Title | Lyrics | Music | Artist | Length |
|---|---|---|---|---|---|
| 1. | "The End" | Song Yang-ha; Kim Jae-hyun | Song Yang-ha; Kim Jae-hyun | Kim Yong-jin (Bohemian) | 3:02 |
| 2. | "The End" (Inst.) | | Song Yang-ha; Kim Jae-hyun | | 3:02 |
| Total length: | | | | | 6:04 |

==== Part 2 ====
Released on November 18, 2019
| No. | Title | Lyrics | Music | Artist | Length |
|---|---|---|---|---|---|
| 1. | "Deep Sorrow" (한숨만) | Kim Chang-rak; Kim Soo-bin | Kim Chang-rak; Kim Soo-bin | Ben | 4:04 |
| 2. | "Deep Sorrow" (Inst.) | | Kim Chang-rak; Kim Soo-bin | | 4:04 |
| Total length: | | | | | 8:08 |

==== Part 3 ====
Released on November 25, 2019
| No. | Title | Lyrics | Music | Artist | Length |
|---|---|---|---|---|---|
| 1. | "Can't Let Go" (놓을 수 없다) | Taibian | Taibian; Baaq | The One | 4:41 |
| 2. | "Can't Let Go" (Inst.) | | Taibian; Baaq | | 4:41 |
| Total length: | | | | | 9:22 |

=== Chart performance ===
| Title | Year | Peak positions | Remarks | Ref. |
| Title | Year | KOR | Remarks | Ref. |
|---|---|---|---|---|
| "Deep Sorrow" (한숨만) (Ben) | 2019 | 158 | Part 2 | |

== Viewership ==
Chief of Staff : South Korea viewers per episode (thousands)

| Season | Episode number | | | | | | | | | | Average |
| Season | 1 | 2 | 3 | 4 | 5 | 6 | 7 | 8 | 9 | 10 | Average |
|---|---|---|---|---|---|---|---|---|---|---|---|
| 1 | 887 | 1031 | 1014 | 1046 | 830 | 924 | 850 | 1138 | 943 | 1231 | 989 |
| 2 | 914 | 870 | 752 | 797 | 772 | 940 | 962 | 936 | 937 | 1159 | 904 |

Source: Audience measurement performed nationwide by Nielsen Media Research.

Average TV viewership ratings (season 1)
| Ep. | Original broadcast date | Title | Average audience share (AGB Nielsen) | |
| Ep. | Original broadcast date | Title | Nationwide | Seoul |
|---|---|---|---|---|
| 1 | June 14, 2019 | 6g Badge (6g의 배지) | 4.375% | 5.592% |
| 2 | June 15, 2019 | Rupture (파열) | 4.545% | 4.675% |
| 3 | June 21, 2019 | Reason for Selection (선택의 이유) | 4.436% | 4.637% |
| 4 | June 22, 2019 | Domino (도미노) | 4.398% | 4.532% |
| 5 | June 28, 2019 | Dilemma (딜레마) | 4.012% | 3.786% |
| 6 | June 29, 2019 | Firelight (불빛) | 4.039% | 3.904% |
| 7 | July 5, 2019 | Knot (매듭) | 4.087% | 4.091% |
| 8 | July 6, 2019 | Decapitation (낙화) | 4.974% | 5.090% |
| 9 | July 12, 2019 | 6g's Price (6g의 대가) | 4.379% | 4.185% |
| 10 | July 13, 2019 | Irreducible (돌이킬 수 없는) | 5.314% | 5.616% |
| Average | | | 4.456% | 4.611% |
In the table above, the blue numbers represent the lowest ratings and the red numbers represent the highest ratings.; This drama aired on a cable channel/pay TV which normally has a relatively smaller audience compared to free-to-air TV/public broadcasters (KBS, SBS, MBC and EBS).

Average TV viewership ratings (season 2)
| Ep. | Original broadcast date | Title | Average audience share (AGB Nielsen) | |
| Ep. | Original broadcast date | Title | Nationwide | Seoul |
|---|---|---|---|---|
| 1 | November 11, 2019 | Breakaway (탈피) | 4.166% | 4.544% |
| 2 | November 12, 2019 | Poisonous Fang (독니) | 4.104% | 4.350% |
| 3 | November 18, 2019 | Swamp (늪) | 3.475% | 3.220% |
| 4 | November 19, 2019 | Achilles Tendon (아킬레스 건) | 3.912% | 3.821% |
| 5 | November 25, 2019 | Shadow (그림자) | 3.819% | 4.081% |
| 6 | November 26, 2019 | Maze (미로) | 4.446% | 4.720% |
| 7 | December 2, 2019 | Scapegoat (희생양) | 4.665% | 4.981% |
| 8 | December 3, 2019 | Hunt (사냥) | 4.844% | 4.994% |
| 9 | December 9, 2019 | Hibernation (동면) | 4.659% | 4.661% |
| 10 | December 10, 2019 | Weight of 6 Grams (6g의 무게) | 5.340% | 5.458% |
| Average | | | 4.343% | 4.483% |
In the table above, the blue numbers represent the lowest ratings and the red numbers represent the highest ratings.; This drama aired on a cable channel/pay TV which normally has a relatively smaller audience compared to free-to-air TV/public broadcasters (KBS, SBS, MBC and EBS).

== Awards and nominations ==
| Year | Award | Category | Nominee | Result | Ref. |
|---|---|---|---|---|---|
| 2019 | 12th Korea Drama Awards | Top Excellence Award, Actor | Lee Jung-jae | Nominated | |
