= Basketball (TV series) =

2013 South Korean television series

- Promotional poster
- Genre: Period drama Romance; Sports
- Written by: Kim Gwa-jang
- Directed by: Kwak Jung-hwan
- Starring: Do Ji-han; Lee Elijah; Jung Dong-hyun
- Music by: Choi Chul-ho
- Country of origin: South Korea
- Original language: Korean
- No. of episodes: 18

Production
- Executive producer: Park Ho-shik
- Producers: Shin Dae-shik; Jung Jung-do; Lee Esther
- Production company: CJ E&M

Original release
- Network: tvN
- Release: October 21 – December 31, 2013

Basketball (Korean: 빠스껫 볼; RR: Ppaseukket bol) is a 2013 South Korean television series starring Do Ji-han, Lee Elijah and Jung Dong-hyun. It aired on cable channel tvN from October 21 to December 31, 2013 on Mondays and Tuesdays at 22:00 (KST) for 18 episodes.

== Plot ==
Set during the turbulent years of the Japanese occupation until independence, and a few years before the division of Korea into North and South, the story is about aspiring basketball players from various background and their life. The drama follows the loves, conflicts, unity, and emotional victory of young athletes who cling to the sport as the bright spot in the darkness of their times.

== Cast ==
- Do Ji-han as Kang San, protagonist who grows up in the late 1930s in a dirt-poor village, and dreams of overcoming a life of poverty and hardship by finding success as part of the national basketball team.
- Lee Elijah as Choi Shin-young, who comes from a rich family in the capital Kyeongseong (now Seoul) and attended school in Japan, after which she returns to Korea and begins working as a magazine reporter. Kang San falls in love with her despite the disparity in their social standing.
- Jung Dong-hyun as Min Chi-ho, a basketball star enjoying nationwide popularity. With his fame, he inspires pride and spirit in his compatriots in the midst of the difficulties suffered during the Japanese occupation. He and Kang San become rivals in basketball and love.
- Gong Hyung-jin as Gong Yoon-bae
- Kim Eung-soo as Choi Je-gook
- Park Ye-eun as Go Bong-soon, a maid who speaks with a Chungcheong dialect. She came to work for Shin-young's family after her family lost its land during the Japanese occupation. She has a bright character and a knack at finding realistic solutions to problems.
- Jung In-sun as Hong Byeo-ri
- Park Soon-chun as Geum-nam
- Son Beom-joon as Hwang Bok-joo
- Jin Kyung as woman from Bamsil
- Kim Bo-mi as Mi-sook
- Kim Soo-hyun as Director Kim
- Ahn Suk-hwan as Min Tae-shin
- Kang Sung-min as Oh In-soo
- Ji Il-joo as Lee Hong-ki
- Kang Kyung-hun as Hong-ki's mother
- Jung Seung-kyo as Bae Sung-won
- Han Young-soo as Yong-goo
- Park Gun as Soo-dong
- Choi Chang-kyun as So Chil-bok
- Lee Han-wi as Yoon Deok-myung
- Go In-beom as Byun Joon-pyo
- Ha Yong-jin as Takeshi
- Jo Hee-bong as one-man band
- Park Ah-sung as Poor villager
- Jang Hee-soo as Chi-ho's mother
- Yeon Min-ji as Commissioner's wife
- Jang Jae-ho as Choi Tae-young, Choi Shin-young's brother.
- Kim Hyuk as Kim Hyuk
- Ham Sung-min as Sung-min
- Lee Jung-jin as basketball player (cameo)
- Oh Ji-ho as basketball player (cameo)
- Kang Nam-gil as Byeo-ri's father (cameo)
- Ida Daussy as French journalist (cameo)
