= Massstar =

South Korean webtoon artist

massstar
- Area: Webtoon artist
- Notable works: unTouchable

- Massstar
- Hangul: 맛스타
- Revised Romanization: Mat Seu Ta
- McCune–Reischauer: Mat Sŭ T'a

massstar (Korean: 맛스타) is a South Korean webtoon artist. She is best known for her webcomic unTouchable.

== Career ==
massstar developed a love of drawing when she was young, and wanted to be a comics artist since she was in primary school. However, she hesitated to take up comics due to a belief in South Korea that comic artists are unable to feed themselves. When she was in university, she decided that she should try to follow her passion because she "only lived once." massstar participated in a comic competition held by Naver, which gave her the chance to debut.

massstar created the webtoon unTouchable, a story about vampires who absorb energy as a source of life through physical contact rather than drinking blood. From February 12, 2014, to March 31, 2017, unTouchable was serialized on WEBTOON. In July of the same year, the Chinese and English translated versions of unTouchable were serialized on the service as well.

From February 10 to 15, 2015, massstar attended the Taipei International Comics and Animation Festival together with fellow webtoon artist Oh Seong-dae. Both of them hosted autograph sessions in the WEBTOON booth.

unTouchable was later adapted into a Chinese television series in 2017. The series stars Zhang Yuxi and Xing Zhaolin, and gained a significant following.

She later created the webtoon Nae Yeojachinguneun Sangnamja ("My Girlfriend is the Man"), which was serialized on WEBTOON from August 30, 2018 to January 16, 2020. It was later adapted into a South Korean television series in 2025.
