= Hong Seo-young =

South Korean actress (born 1995)

- Born: Hong Seo-young; 4 January 1995 (age 31); Seoul, South Korea
- Other name: Hong Seo-yeong
- Education: Chung-Ang University (Department of Performing Arts and Theater Major)
- Occupations: Actress; singer; model
- Years active: 2016–present
- Agents: C-JeS Entertainment; CL& Company
- Known for: My Absolute Boyfriend; The Liar and His Lover; Her Private Life
- Relatives: Hong Min-gi (brother)

Korean name
- Hangul: 홍서영
- RR: Hong Seoyeong
- MR: Hong Sŏyŏng

Hong Seo-young is a South Korean actress, singer and model. She is known for her roles in dramas such as The Liar and His Lover, Her Private Life, The Good Detective Season 2 and My Absolute Boyfriend.

== Personal life ==
Hong Seo-young's older brother Hong Min-gi is a volleyball player from Hanyang University later he was scouted by a team of volleyball and he was selected by Hyundai Capital with the 7th pick in the 1st round in the rookie draft ahead of the 2017–18 season.

== Discography ==
=== Soundtrack appearances ===
Title	Year	Album	Ref.
"Until The Day You Come Back" (돌아올 그날까지)	2016	Dorian Gray	
"Counting Stars at Night" (별 헤는 밤)	2017	The Liar and His Lover	
"Yesterday, Today and Tomorrow" (어제 오늘 내일)	2017	The Liar and His Lover	

== Filmography ==
=== Television series ===
Year	Title	Role	Ref.
2017	The Liar and His Lover	Chae Yu-na	
2017	KBS Drama Special: "A Bad Family"	Kim Na-na	
2018	Children of a Lesser God	Chun Su-in	
2019	Her Private Life	Choi Da-in	
2019	My Absolute Boyfriend	Diana	
2022	The Good Detective 2	Moon Bo-kyung	

=== Web series ===
Year	Title	Role	Ref.
2018	It's Okay to Be Sensitive	Yoon Chae-ah	

== Theatre ==
Year	Title	Korean Title	Role	Ref.
2016	Dorian Gray	도리안 그레이	Sybil Bane	
2017	Napoleon	나폴레옹	Josephine	
2019	Shinheung Military Academy	신흥무관학교	Trumpet	
2019	Hedwig	헤드윅	Yitzhak	
2020	Lizzie	리지	Emma Borden	
2020	Amadeus	아마데우스	Constance	
2021	Gwanghwamun Sonata	광화문 연가	Sua	
2022	Chami	차미	Chami	
2022	Four Mins	포미니츠	Jennie	

== Commercial advertisements ==
Year	Brand	Product	Notes
2021	Acuvue Lens	Acuvue	

== Awards and nominations ==
Year	Award	Category	Nominee / Work	Result	Ref.
2017	1st Korea Musical Awards	Female Rookie Award	Dorian Gray	Nominated	
