= The Good Detective =

2020 South Korean television series

- Promotional poster season 2
- Hangul: 모범형사
- Hanja: 模範刑事
- Lit.: A Model Detective
- RR: Mobeomhyeongsa
- MR: Mobŏmhyŏngsa
- Genre: Crime drama; Detective
- Created by: JTBC
- Written by: Choi Jin-won
- Directed by: Jo Nam-gook
- Starring: Son Hyun-joo; Jang Seung-jo; Lee Elijah; Oh Jung-se; Ji Seung-hyun; Kim Hyo-jin; Jung Moon-sung
- Music by: Park Se-joon (S1-2)
- Country of origin: South Korea
- Original language: Korean
- No. of seasons: 2
- No. of episodes: 32

Production
- Executive producer: Jo Jun-hyung
- Producers: Joo Bang-ok; Park Joon-seo
- Running time: 70 minutes
- Production companies: Blossom Story; JTBC Studios

Original release
- Network: JTBC
- Release: July 6, 2020 – September 18, 2022

The Good Detective (Korean: 모범형사) is a South Korean television series starring Son Hyun-joo, Jang Seung-jo, Lee Elijah, Oh Jung-se and Ji Seung-hyun. It aired on JTBC from July 6 to August 25, 2020.

The drama was considered a success with the viewership ratings doubled from the start to finish and the possibility of sequel mentioned by production team. It was confirmed to return for second season which began its production around October 2021.

The season 2 began airing from July 30, 2022, on Saturday and Sunday at 22:30 (KST).

== Series overview ==
Season	Episodes	Originally released		Time slot	Avg. viewership (million)
Season	Episodes	First released	Last released	Time slot	Avg. viewership (million)
1	16	July 6, 2020	August 25, 2020	Monday and Tuesday at 21:30 (KST)	1.208
2	16	July 30, 2022	September 18, 2022	Saturday and Sunday at 22:30 (KST)	1.126

== Synopsis ==
Set in Incheon, South Korea, the drama tells stories of those who try to hide ugly truths and those who uncover the truths.

Kang Do-chang (Son Hyun-joo) has worked as a detective for the past 18 years. He was born and raised in Incheon. He investigates cases using his experience and personal connections, forgoing scientific technique or reasoning power.

Oh Ji-hyuk (Jang Seung-jo) is an elite detective. He has 9 years of experience. Unlike Kang Do-chang, he investigates cases using evidence and insight into the criminal's psyche. Due to a trauma from his childhood, he does not share his feelings. He is wealthy thanks to his late uncle, who left him with a large inheritance.

Jin Seo-kyung (Lee Elijah) works as a newspaper reporter. She is a 5-year veteran and passionate about her work.

== Cast ==
=== Overview ===
Character	Portrayed by	Season	
Character	Portrayed by	Season 1 (2020)	Season 2 (2022)
Kang Do-chang	Son Hyun-joo	Main	Main
Oh Ji-hyuk	Jang Seung-jo	Main	Main
Oh Jong-tae	Oh Jung-se	Main	Guest
Jin Seo-kyung	Lee Elijah	Main	
Yoo Jung-seok	Ji Seung-hyun	Main	
Cheon Na-na	Kim Hyo-jin		Main
Woo Tae-ho	Jung Moon-sung		Main
Recurring
Kwon Jae-hong	Cha Rae-hyung	Recurring	Recurring
Ji Man-goo	Jung Soon-won	Recurring	Recurring
Byun Ji-woong	Kim Ji-hoon	Recurring	Recurring
Shim Dong-wook	Kim Myung-joon	Recurring	Recurring
Moon Sang-bum	Son Jong-hak	Recurring	Recurring
Woo Bong-shik	Jo Hee-bong	Recurring	Recurring
Kang Eun-hee	Baek Eun-hye	Recurring	Recurring
Yoon Sang-mi	Shin Dong-mi	Recurring	Guest
Moon Bo-kyung	Hong Seo-young		Recurring
Others
Woo Bong-shik	Jo Hee-bong	Others	
Park Hong-doo	Shin Jae-hwi	Others	
Cheon Seong-dae	Song Young-chang		Others
Lee Seong-gon	Kim In-kwon		Others
Bride of Kang Do-chang	Park Hyo-joo		Guest

=== Main ===
- Son Hyun-joo as Kang Do-chang

A tough and loyal detective of 18 years who investigates cases using his experience and personal connections, forgoing scientific technique or reasoning power. He is a senior detective of the Violent Crimes Division 2 and also a former gangster.

- Jang Seung-jo as Oh Ji-hyuk

An elite homicide detective of 9 years, Oh Ji-hyuk investigates cases using evidence and insight into the criminal's psyche, unlike Kang Do-chang. He has insomnia due to a past trauma.

- Lee Elijah as Jin Seo-kyung (Season 1)

A passionate veteran reporter who isn't afraid to reveal the truth and doesn't give in to outside pressure. After being known as a fierce freelance reporter, she was hired by Yoo Jung-seok for Junghan Daily.

- Oh Jung-se as Oh Jong-tae (Season 1)

A chaebol businessman with questionable morals. He is Oh Ji-hyuk's cousin.

- Ji Seung-hyun as Yoo Jung-seok (Season 1)

The head of Junghan Daily's social affairs department and Jin Seo-kyung's boss.

- Kim Hyo-jin as Cheon Na-na (Season 2)

Director of TJ Group born out of wedlock to the group president and treated like an orphan.

- Jung Moon-sung as Woo Tae-ho (Season 2)

TJ group's legal team leader and Cheon Na-na's husband.

=== Supporting ===
==== West Incheon Police ====
- Son Jong-hak as Moon Sang-bum

Senior detective of the Detective Bureau and chief of West Incheon Police Station.

- Jo Hee-bong as Woo Bong-shik

Senior detective of the Detective Bureau and leader of the Violent Crimes Division 2.

- Cha Rae-hyung as Kwon Jae-hong

Incheon West Police Station Violent Crimes Division 2 detective

- Kim Ji-hoon as Byun Ji-woong

Incheon West Police Station Violent Crimes Division 2 detective

- Jung Soon-won as Ji Man-goo

Incheon Western Police Station Violent Crimes Division 2 detective

- Kim Myung-joon as Shim Dong-wook

Incheon Western Police Station Violent Crimes Division 2 detective
Season 1

- Yang Hyun-min as Nam Guk-hyun

Leader of the Violent Crimes Division 1.

- Shin Dong-mi as Yoon Sang-mi

A former detective who was promoted as an investigator of the Incheon West Police Station. She is investigating Kang Do-chang regarding his potential promotion.

==== TJ Group ====
- Choi Dae-hoon as Cheon Sang-woo

Cheon Na-na's half-brother.

- Hong Seo-young as Moon Bo-kyung

Team staff to fight between the 2nd strongest team and the TJ group.

- Park Won-sang as Choi Yong-geun

The leader of the legal team that ignites the power struggle between the brothers.

- Song Young-chang as Cheon Seong-dae

Chairman of TJ Group.

==== Seoul Metropolitan Police Agency ====
- Lee Joong-ok as Jang Ki-jin

Leader of the Seoul Central Investigation Unit.

- Hong Sang-pyo as Jo Jin-cheol

Detective of the Seoul Central Investigation Unit.

==== Kang Do-chang's family ====
- Baek Eun-hye as Kang Eun-hee

Do-chang's younger sister

- Yang Hee-won as Jae-woong

Kang Eun-hee's son

- Lee Ha-eun as Lee Eun-hye

Lee Dae-chul's daughter and Kang Do-chang's adopted daughter.
Season 1

- Park Ji-hwan as Kang Eun-hee's ex-husband and Jae-woong's father

==== Others ====
Season 1

- Jo Jae-yoon as Lee Dae-chul, a death row inmate convicted of murdering Yoon Ji-sun.
- Kim Ryeo-eun as Yoon Ji-sun, a painter and the murder victim.
- Lee Seung-hoon as So Jae-sub, a lawyer who takes the case of Lee Dae-chul's retrial.
- Son Byong-ho as Kim Gi-tae, a former, corrupt public prosecutor who was caught in a corruption scandal and is in prison.
- Jo Jae-ryong as Jo Sung-dae, Kim Gi-tae's subordinate.
- Ahn Si-ha as Jung Yoo-seon, widow of the late detective Jang Jin-su.
- Hwang Tae-gwang as Jang Jin-su, he was in charge of Yoon Ji-sun's murder case and died during investigation.
- Lee Sang-woon as Song Gwang-hee, reporter at Junghan Daily.
- Shin Jae-hwi as Park Hong-doo
- Lee Hyun-wook as Park Gun-ho, a former prison guard who wants to prove Lee Dae Chul is innocent.

Season 2

- Park Geun-hyung as Jung In-beom, Jung Hee-joo's grandfather who is a victim in a serial murder case.
- Lee Seung-joon as Lee Han-joo, a prison guard.
- Bang Eun-jung as Sung Joo-ri
- Kim In-kwon as Lee Seong-gon, the bus driver in the city where the incident took place.
- Ha Young as Jung Hee-joo, Victim Serial Murder and Hand-Painted Punctuation Shop Owner.
- Baek Sang-hee as Kim Min-ji, Was a victim of Cheon Sang-woo's assault case.
- Jo Tae-gwan as Michael Cha, CEO of McQueen Korea.
- Park Ye-ni as Laura Kane, Lee Seong-gon's younger sister.

=== Special appearances ===
Season 2

- Park Hyo-joo as bride of Kang Do-chang
- Ko Chang-seok as Cha Moon-ho, Incheon District Office Prosecutor

== Original soundtrack ==
The Good Detective 2: Original Television Soundtrack

Soundtrack album by Various Artists
- Released: September 18, 2022
- Genres: Soundtrack; K-pop
- Length: 107:47
- Languages: Korean; English
- Label: Studio LuluLala

== Production ==
The early working title of the series is Silence (Korean: 사일런스; RR: Sailleonseu).

The series was originally scheduled to premiere on April 27, 2020, but it was pushed back to July due to the COVID-19 pandemic.

After the series ended, executive producer Jo Jun-hyung revealed the possibility of a sequel in the interview with media.

On February 28, 2022, it was confirmed that actor Son Hyun-joo had tested positive for COVID-19, causing filming for season 2 to be suspended.

On March 7, 2022, it was reported that actor Son Hyeon-joo was released from COVID-19 quarantine on the 5th and resumed filming for season 2. The filming was completed in May 2022.

On June 28, 2022, a poster for Season 2 was released.

== Viewership ==
The Good Detective : South Korea viewers per episode (millions)

Season	Episode number																Average
Season	1	2	3	4	5	6	7	8	9	10	11	12	13	14	15	16	Average
1	0.880	0.838	0.897	1.014	0.962	0.957	1.043	1.140	1.177	1.371	1.350	1.500	1.439	1.530	1.640	1.592	1.208
2	0.844	1.035	0.952	1.425	1.044	1.084	1.050	1.599	1.066	1.264	1.189	1.378	0.952	1.361	1.167	1.774	1.126

Source: Audience measurement performed nationwide by Nielsen Korea.

=== Season 1 ===
Average TV viewership ratings (season 1)
Ep.	Original broadcast date	Average audience share (Nielsen Korea)	
Ep.	Original broadcast date	Nationwide	Seoul
1	July 6, 2020	3.897%	4.584%
2	July 7, 2020	3.775%	4.662%
3	July 13, 2020	4.178%	5.162%
4	July 14, 2020	4.821%	5.721%
5	July 20, 2020	4.306%	5.153%
6	July 21, 2020	4.380%	5.381%
7	July 27, 2020	4.811%	5.454%
8	July 28, 2020	5.148%	6.323%
9	August 3, 2020	5.852%	6.665%
10	August 4, 2020	6.372%	7.442%
11	August 10, 2020	6.341%	7.474%
12	August 11, 2020	6.847%	8.267%
13	August 17, 2020	6.510%	7.805%
14	August 18, 2020	6.955%	8.365%
15	August 24, 2020	7.609%	9.106%
16	August 25, 2020	7.469%	8.464%
Average		5.579%	6.627%

=== Season 2 ===
Average TV viewership ratings (season 2)
Ep.	Original broadcast date	Average audience share (Nielsen Korea)	
Ep.	Original broadcast date	Nationwide	Seoul
1	July 30, 2022	3.720% (2nd)	3.969% (2nd)
2	July 31, 2022	4.720% (1st)	5.004% (1st)
3	August 6, 2022	4.208% (1st)	4.112% (1st)
4	August 7, 2022	5.963% (1st)	5.951% (1st)
5	August 13, 2022	4.271% (1st)	4.027% (1st)
6	August 14, 2022	4.664% (1st)	4.615% (1st)
7	August 20, 2022	5.028% (1st)	5.304% (1st)
8	August 21, 2022	6.995% (1st)	7.065% (1st)
9	August 27, 2022	4.756% (1st)	5.070% (1st)
10	August 28, 2022	5.657% (1st)	6.248% (1st)
11	September 3, 2022	5.507% (1st)	5.501% (1st)
12	September 4, 2022	5.982% (1st)	6.207% (1st)
13	September 10, 2022	4.253% (1st)	4.304% (1st)
14	September 11, 2022	5.984% (1st)	6.060% (1st)
15	September 17, 2022	5.250% (1st)	5.578% (1st)
16	September 18, 2022	8.081% (1st)	7.820% (1st)
Average		5.315%	5.427%
In the table above, the blue numbers represent the lowest ratings and the red numbers represent the highest ratings.; This drama aired on a cable channel/pay TV which normally has a relatively smaller audience compared to free-to-air TV/public broadcasters (KBS, SBS, MBC and EBS).

== International broadcast ==
- Malaysia: TV3 (23 June 2021)
