= Durian's Affair =

2023 South Korean television series

- Promotional poster
- Also known as: Mrs. Durian
- Hangul: 아씨 두리안
- Lit.: Lady Durian
- RR: Assi durian
- MR: Assi turian
- Genre: Fantasy; Melodrama; Romance
- Developed by: Jung Hoe-seok (planning)
- Written by: Im Sung-han (Note: Credited as "Phoebe (Im Sung-han)".)
- Directed by: Shin Woo-cheol; Jung Yeo-jin
- Starring: Park Joo-mi; Choi Myung-gil; Kim Min-jun; Han Da-gam; Jeon No-min; Yoon Hae-young; Ji Young-san; Yoo Jung-hoo; Lee Da-yeon
- Music by: Lee Nam-eun; Park Se-joon
- Country of origin: South Korea
- Original language: Korean
- No. of episodes: 16

Production
- Executive producer: Jung Hyeong-seo (CP)
- Producers: Baek Ji-soo; Ahn Eun-mi; Kim Seong-min
- Production companies: Barunson Studio; Hi Ground

Original release
- Network: TV Chosun
- Release: June 24 – August 13, 2023

Durian's Affair (Korean: 아씨 두리안) is a 2023 South Korean television series written by Im Sung-han, and starring Park Joo-mi, Choi Myung-gil, Kim Min-jun, Han Da-gam, Jeon No-min, Yoon Hae-young, Ji Young-san, Yoo Jung-hoo, and Lee Da-yeon. It aired on TV Chosun from June 24 to August 13, 2023, every Saturday and Sunday at 21:10 (KST). It is also available for streaming on Coupang Play in South Korea, and on Viki and Viu in selected regions.

== Synopsis ==
Two women from a noble family in the Joseon period get entangled with men through time travel to the year 2023, the present.

== Cast ==
=== Main ===
- Park Joo-mi as Du Ri-an

A woman from Joseon who looks gentle and nice, but is strong and tough in spirit.

- Choi Myung-gil as Baek Do-i / Madam Kim
1. Baek Do-i: a member of chaebol Dan family, and is the chairwoman of its conglomerate.
2. Madam Kim: Ri-an's mother-in-law.
- Kim Min-jun as Dan Chi-gam / Dol-soe
1. Dan Chi-gam: Do-i's second son who is the heir of the Dan family.
2. Dol-soe: Ri-an's parent's farmhand.
- Han Da-gam as Lee Eun-seong

Chi-gam's wife.

- Jeon No-min as Dan Chi-gang / Nobleman Kim
1. Dan Chi-gang: Do-i's first son who is the director of a maternity hospital.
2. Nobleman Kim: Madam Kim's father.
- Yoon Hae-young as Jang Se-mi

Chi-gang's wife.

- Ji Young-san as Dan Chi-jung / Park Il-soo
1. Dan Chi-jung: Do-i's youngest son who is the representative of a golf club.
2. Park Il-soo: Ri-an's husband.
- Yoo Jung-hoo as Dan Deung-myung / Park Eon
1. Dan Deung-myung: Chi-gang and Se-mi's son who is a famous actor.
2. Park Eon: Ri-an's son.
- Lee Da-yeon as Kim So-jeo

Ri-an's daughter-in-law.

=== Supporting ===
- Kim Chae-eun as Ayla

A popular anchor.

- Hwang Mi-na as Go Woo-mi

Chi-jung's bride-to-be who is an actress.

- Kwak Min-ho as Joo-nam

Se-mi's cousin who is a TV production director.

- Kim Jin-hyun as Yoo-ro

An assistant director who works with Joo-nam.

- Kim Nam-jin as a housekeeper who works at Eun-seong's house

=== Extended ===
- Lee Han-jin as an entertainment company director
- Oh Yoon-hong as Ayla's mother

=== Special appearance ===
- Jin Hae-sung as the development team leader of a kimchi factory run by Chi-gam

== Production ==
The series was originally titled Fairy Durian (선녀 두리안; Seonnyeo durian). Filming began soon after the script reading of the cast, which was held on February 15, 2023.

== Viewership ==
Durian's Affair : South Korea viewers per episode (millions)

Season	Episode number																Average
Season	1	2	3	4	5	6	7	8	9	10	11	12	13	14	15	16	Average
1	0.838	0.759	0.817	0.998	0.879	1.017	1.037	1.124	1.085	1.234	1.184	0.579	1.387	1.509	1.512	1.628	1.145

Source: Audience measurement performed nationwide by Nielsen Korea.

Average TV viewership ratings
Ep.	Original broadcast date	Average audience share (Nielsen Korea)	
Ep.	Original broadcast date	Nationwide	Seoul
1	June 24, 2023	4.167% (2nd)	3.743% (2nd)
2	June 25, 2023	3.355% (3rd)	2.749% (3rd)
3	July 1, 2023	4.002% (2nd)	3.882% (2nd)
4	July 2, 2023	4.666% (2nd)	4.161% (2nd)
5	July 8, 2023	4.313% (2nd)	3.606% (2nd)
6	July 9, 2023	5.132% (2nd)	4.723% (2nd)
7	July 15, 2023	5.149% (2nd)	4.428% (2nd)
8	July 16, 2023	5.509% (2nd)	4.673% (2nd)
9	July 22, 2023	5.436% (2nd)	4.503% (2nd)
10	July 23, 2023	6.295% (2nd)	5.585% (2nd)
11	July 29, 2023	5.516% (2nd)	4.685% (2nd)
12	July 30, 2023	6.422% (2nd)	5.548% (2nd)
13	August 5, 2023	6.795% (2nd)	6.341% (2nd)
14	August 6, 2023	7.164% (2nd)	6.849% (2nd)
15	August 12, 2023	7.389% (1st)	6.808% (1st)
16	August 13, 2023	8.103% (1st)	7.817% (1st)
Average		5.588%	5.006%
In the table above, the blue numbers represent the lowest ratings and the red numbers represent the highest ratings.; This series aired on a cable channel/pay TV which normally has a relatively smaller audience compared to free-to-air TV/public broadcasters (KBS, SBS, MBC and EBS).
