= Hur Hyun-jun =

South Korean singer and actor (born 2000)

- Born: March 9, 2000 (age 26); Busan, South Korea
- Other names: Hwall; Hyunjun Ho; Hyun Jun
- Education: Hanlim Multi Art School
- Occupations: Singer; actor
- Years active: 2017–present
- Agent: Blossom Entertainment
- Musical career
- Genres: K-pop
- Instrument: Vocals
- Labels: Cre.ker; Dia Note
- Formerly of: The Boyz
- Website: Official website

Korean name
- Hangul: 허현준
- RR: Heo Hyeonjun
- MR: Hŏ Hyŏnjun

Hur Hyun-jun (Korean: 허현준; born March 9, 2000), known professionally as Hyunjun, Hyun Jun or Hyunjun Hur, and formerly known by the stage name Hwall (활), is a South Korean singer and actor. He is best known as a former member of South Korean boy group The Boyz. He has also gained recognition with the web series Color Rush (2021).

== Early life ==
Hyun Jun graduated from Hanlim Multi Art School in 2019.

== Career ==
=== 2017–2019: Debut with The Boyz ===
In early July, music label Cre.ker Entertainment started releasing videos of artists joining their newest boy group. On July 18, Hur was confirmed to be in the final lineup of the group, The Boyz. From August 23 to October 11, Hur joined his second reality show Flower Boy Snack Shop (꽃미남 분식집), this time joining his bandmates and releasing the song "I'm Your Boy" during the finale episode. On December 6, the group officially debuted, selling out all 4,000 seats debut showcase where they released their first extended play The First and its lead single "Boy".

The group released their second extended play The Start and its lead single "Giddy Up" on April 3, 2018. Due to health problems, Hur couldn't promote with the group and subsequently had to halt all activities for three months. The twelve members, with Hur back from his hiatus, released a special digital single titled "Keeper" on July 12, which was produced by Block B's Park Kyung. On July 24, they won their first "Rookie Award" during the Korea Brand Awards. He also won several awards with The Boyz, including the "Rookie Award" at the Soribada Best K-Music Awards and the "Best New Male Artist Award" at the 2018 Melon Music Awards.

In 2019, Hur went on tour with The Boyz' Asia fan concert tour "The Castle", with dates in South Korea, Japan, Hong Kong, Singapore, Indonesia, Thailand, Taiwan, and the Philippines. The group released their second single album Bloom Bloom and its lead single "Bloom Bloom" on April 29, 2019. On 7 May, Hur received his first-ever music show win on SBS MTV's The Show with The Boyz. The group released their fourth extended play Dreamlike and its lead single "D.D.D" on August 19, Hur did not participate in the 'DDD' promotions due to his ankle. He only appeared in certain parts of the MV. On October 23, Hur officially left the group due to health issues and pursued a solo and acting career afterwards.

=== 2020–present: Solo work ===
On August 14, 2020, He made his solo debut with the song "Baragi" under his own music label, Dia Note.

In April 2021, Hur released his second digital single "Vo!d". He released an acoustic version of "Baragi" on June 19. Later that year, Hur made his acting debut with the web series Color Rush.

On January 3, 2022, Hur released his third digital single "Let Me Drown". On February 18, it was confirmed that Hur had signed an exclusive contract with Blossom Entertainment to pursue his solo career.

On April 1, 2022, Blossom Entertainment confirmed through his Instagram account that Hyun Jun has been cast in the play Yeodo. The performance was at Baekam Art Hall in Gangnam-gu, Seoul, from May 28 to July 10, 2022.

== Discography ==
=== As lead singles ===
Year	Title	Album
2020	"Baragi"	Non-album singles
2021	"Vo!d"	Non-album singles
2021	"Baragi" (Acoustic version)	Non-album singles
2022	"Let Me Drown"	Non-album singles

== Filmography ==
=== Web series ===
Year	Title	Role	Note	Ref.
2020–2021	Color Rush	Go Yoo-Han	Season 1	

=== Television series ===
Year	Title	Role	Ref.
2025	My Girlfriend Is the Man!	Lee Min Hyeok	

=== Theater ===
Year	Title	Role	Ref.
2022	Yeodo	Lee Seong	

== Songwriting credits ==
Year	Song	Album	Artist	With	Notes
2017	"I'm Your Boy"	The First	The Boyz	The Boyz	Credited as The Boyz
2018	"Just U"	The Start	The Boyz	The Boyz	Credited as The Boyz
2019	"Clover"	Bloom Bloom	The Boyz	The Boyz, Hwang Yu-bin, Jung Ho-hyun	Credited as The Boyz
2022	"Let Me Drown"	Non-album single	Hyunjun Hur	Kwaca	—N/a
