= Sakurako Ohara =

Japanese singer

- 大原櫻子
- Born: January 10, 1996 (age 30); Tokyo, Japan
- Occupations: Actress; singer
- Years active: 2012–present
- Father: Naochika Hayashida
- Musical career
- Genre: J-pop
- Instruments: Vocals; Guitar
- Labels: Victor Entertainment; Hearst Records (Victor Entertainment)
- Website: oharasakurako.net

Sakurako Ohara (大原櫻子, Ōhara Sakurako; born January 10, 1996) is a Japanese actress and pop singer under Victor Entertainment. Her father is narrator Naochika Hayashida.

== Filmography ==
=== Television series ===
Title	Year	Role	Notes	Ref.
Koukou Nyuushi	2012		Guest appearance	
Shinigami-kun	2014	Fukuko Onishi	Guest appearance	
Water Polo Yankees	2014	Nagisa Iwasaki		
Koinaka	2015	Nanami Miura		
A Girl & Three Sweethearts	2016	Manami Nishijima		
Kono Koe wo Kimi ni	2017	Misuzu Inaba		
Natsuzora	2019	Yasue Yamada	Asadora	
Bishonure Tantei Mizuno Hagoromo	2019	Hagoromo Mizuno	Soaking Wet Private Detective Hagoromo Mizuno	
Piple	2020	Kaede		
Tsumari Sukitte Iitain dakedo	2021	Chitose		

=== Film ===
Title	Year	Role	Notes	Ref.
The Liar and His Lover	2013	Riko Koeda	Lead role	
Lady Maiko	2014	Chiharu Kojima	Maiko period	
Let's Go, Jets!	2017			
The Day's Organ	2019	Mitsue Nonomiya	Lead role	
Inubu: The Dog Club	2021	Yoshimi		
xxxHolic	2022	Customer		
Mr. Hoshino Runs Again Today	2026	Shiori Hanaura		

=== Theatre ===
Title	Year	Role	Notes
Fun Home	2018	Medium Alison	Lead role
Miss Saigon	2020	Kim	Lead role
In This Corner of the World	2024	Suzu Urano	Lead role

== Discography ==
=== Studio albums ===
No.	Album details	Charts
No.	Album details	JPN
1	Happy: Released: March 25, 2015; Format(s): CD+DVD, CD+case	2
2	V: Released: June 29, 2016; Format(s): CD+DVD, CD+case	3
3	Enjoy: Released: June 27, 2018; Format(s): CD+DVD, CD+case	7
4	Passion: Released: February 5, 2020; Format(s): CD	7
5	L: Released: March 3, 2021; Format(s): CD	7
6	Fanfare: Released: December 7, 2022; Format(s): CD	14
7	Traveling: Released: June 11, 2025; Format(s): CD	14

=== Mini albums ===
1	Spotlight (スポットライト, Supottoraito): Released: August 30, 2023; Format(s): CD	17

=== Compilation albums ===
1	Cam On! 5th Anniversary Best: Released: March 6, 2019; Format(s): CD	4
2	All Time Singles Best 2014–2024 "Anniversary" (オールタイムシングルベスト 2014-2024「Anniversary」): Released: August 21, 2024; Format(s): CD	13

=== Singles ===
No.	Title	Release date	Charts	Album
No.	Title	Release date	JPN	Album
1	"Thank You" (サンキュー。, Sankyuu)	November 26, 2014	12	Happy
2	"Hitomi" (瞳)	January 7, 2015	5	Happy
3	"Manatsu no Taiyou" (真夏の太陽)	July 22, 2015	11	V
4	"Kimi o Wasurenai yo" (キミを忘れないよ)	November 4, 2015	6	V
5	"Daisuki" (だいすき)	June 1, 2016	5	V
6	"Hirari" (ひらり)	March 8, 2017	7	Enjoy
7	"My Favorite Jewel"	August 9, 2017	8	Enjoy
8	"Sayonara" (さよなら)	November 22, 2017	7	Enjoy
9	"Nakitai Kurai" (泣きたいくらい)	April 25, 2018	6	Enjoy
10	"I Am I"	July 31, 2019	11	TBA
11	"Shine on Me"	December 4, 2019	6	TBA

=== Video albums ===
No.	Album details	Charts
No.	Album details	JPN
1	1st Tour 2015 Spring: Cherryyyy Blossoooom!!!: Released: July 22, 2015; Format(s): DVD, Blu-ray	7
2	Concert Tour 2016: Carvival at Nippon Budokan: Released: December 21, 2016; Format(s): DVD, Blu-ray	9
3	Sakurako Ohara 4th Tour 2017 Autumn 〜Accecherry Box: Released: January 31, 2018; Format(s): DVD, Blu-ray	
