= The Liar and His Lover (TV series) =

2017 South Korean TV series

- Promotional Poster
- Also known as: Lovely Love Lie
- Hangul: 그녀는 거짓말을 너무 사랑해
- Lit.: She Loves Lies Too Much
- RR: Geunyeoneun geojinmareul neomu saranghae
- MR: Kŭnyŏnŭn kŏjinmarŭl nŏmu saranghae
- Genre: Romantic comedy
- Based on: Kanojo wa Uso o Aishisugiteru by Kotomi Aoki
- Developed by: Studio Dragon
- Written by: Kim Kyung-Min
- Directed by: Kim Jin-min
- Creative director: Choi Jin-hee
- Starring: Lee Hyun-woo; Park Soo-young; Lee Jung-jin; Lee Seo-won; Hong Seo-young
- Country of origin: South Korea
- Original language: Korean
- No. of episodes: 16

Production
- Executive producers: Park Ho-shik; Moon Suk-hwan; Oh Kwang-hee
- Producer: Jung Se-ryung
- Camera setup: Single-camera
- Running time: 60 minutes
- Production company: Bon Factory Worldwide

Original release
- Network: TVN
- Release: March 20 – May 9, 2017

Related
- The Liar and His Lover (film)

The Liar and His Lover (Korean: 그녀는 거짓말을 너무 사랑해) is a South Korean television series starring Lee Hyun-woo and Park Soo-young with Lee Jung-jin, Lee Seo-won and Hong Seo-young. The drama is based on the popular Japanese manga Kanojo wa Uso o Aishisugiteru by Kotomi Aoki. It aired on tvN every Monday and Tuesday at 23:00 (KST) starting from March 20, 2017. The series was also released internationally on Netflix starting from October 1, 2019.

== Synopsis ==
The series focuses on a heartbroken genius music composer Kang Han-gyul (Lee Hyun-woo) who meets the talented singer and student Yoon So-rim (Park Soo-young) while he is living under a hidden identity. With her courageous honesty and beautiful singing skills, So-rim draws Han-gyul back to her time again. Along the way, the two of them clash as So-rim starts her career in the music industry and begins to uncover Han-gyul's lies.

== Cast ==
=== Main ===
- Lee Hyun-woo as Kang Han-gyul/K

A former bassist who quit the rock band Crude Play right before they debuted after losing his confidence to perform. He now works behind the scenes as its talented music composer and producer under the name "K". By chance, Han-gyul meets So-rim and begins to fall for her whilst hiding his true identity.

- Park Soo-young as Yoon So-rim

A nineteen-year-old high school student with a beautiful voice. She is scouted by a music CEO and forms the band Mush & Co with her two childhood friends. So-rim's parents died when she was young, and she lives with her grandmother who runs a store called "Happy Fruits and Vegetables". While helping her grandmother by delivering orders to customers one day, So-rim accidentally meets and falls in love at first sight with Han-gyul.

- Lee Jung-jin as Choi Jin-hyuk, director of Sole Music who has been in love with Yoo-na from the beginning and has been waiting for her.
- Lee Seo-won as Seo Chan-young

A bass player who replaced Han-gyul in Crude Play who feels that he has never been fully a part of the group. Chan-young is resentful of Han-gyul and later becomes the producer for So-rim's band and begins to fall for her.

- Hong Seo-young as Chae Yoo-na

Han-gyul's ex-girlfriend, a singer who is criticized by the media for using her body to gain fame. Even after they broke up, her feelings for Kang Han-gyul have never gone away.

=== Supporting ===
==== Crude Play band members ====
- Kim Sung-joo as Yoo Si-hyun (Leader/Vocalist)
- Shin Je-min as Lee Yoon (Guitar/Keyboard)
- Jang Ki-yong as Ji In-ho (Drummer/Rapper)

==== People around Han-gyul ====
- Choi Min-soo as Kang In-woo, a street singer who is Han-gyul's father.

==== People around So-rim ====
- Im Ye-jin as Kim Soon-hee, So-rim's grandmother, who owns a store called Happy Fruits and Vegetables.
- Song Kang as Baek Jin-woo, So-rim's childhood friend and the guitarist of the band Mush & Co. He has a long-standing crush on So-rim.
- Park Jong-hyuk as Lee Kyu-seon, So-rim's childhood friend and the drummer of the band Mush & Co.
- Kim In-kwon as Bong Won-bin, So-rim's homeroom teacher who helped So-rim and her childhood friends become famous.
- Jeon Yoo-rim as Lee Se-jung, So-rim's classmate and rival who is a long-time fan of Chan-young.

==== People around Jin-hyuk ====
- Park Ji-young as Yoo Hyun-jung, CEO of Who Entertainment who has been in love with Han-gyul's father since she was young.
- Lee Ha-eun as Yeon Soo-yeon, an employee of Sole Music who likes Si-hyun.

=== Others ===
- Lee Yu-joon
- Kim Min-seok as Ku Joon-seok
- Yang Kyung-won as Kim-eun
- Park Seon-hee as Kyu-seon's mother
- Kim Seo-young
- In Sung-ho
- Choi Nam-uk
- Choi Na-moo
- Jung Yu-an
- Min Kyung-jin
- Kang Woo-je
- Yoon Eun-byul
- Yu Ji-hyuk
- Choi Ji-an
- Yu Ji-yeon
- Son Yoon-ju (Voice appearance)
- Seo Dan-woo
- Jo Young-seon
- Lee Young-rae
- Kyung Kyu-min
- Lee Ho-seok as member of a band
- Park Jae-seok as member of a band
- Kim Soo-hyun as member of a band
- Han Chan-young as member of a band

=== Special appearances ===
- Baek Soo-ryun
- Park Hye-na
- Park Hae-soo
- Kim Young-pil
- Momoland as girl group from survival show "Produce 20" (Ep. 6)
- INX, boy group from survival show "Produce 20" (Ep. 6)
- Kim Yong-gun as Chairman of Who Entertainment and Hyun-jung's father (Ep. 7)

== Production ==
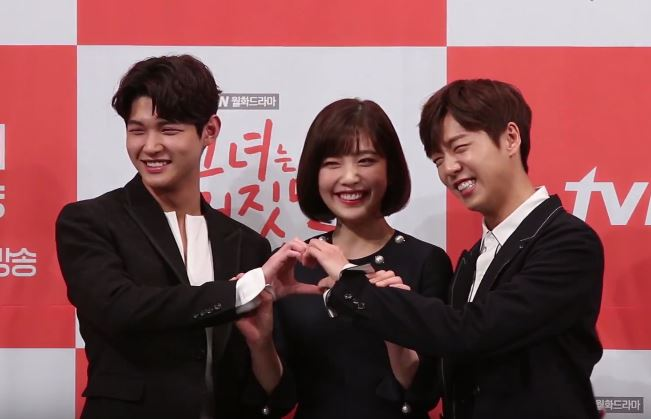
(L-R): Lee Seo-won, Joy and Lee Hyun-woo at the drama's press conference on 14 March 2017

The drama's director Kim Jin-min is known for his hit series Time Between Dog and Wolf and Marriage Contract. The production company Bon Factory Worldwide also produced The Greatest Love, You're Beautiful, Master's Sun, and She Was Pretty. The Liar and His Lover marked the acting debut of Red Velvet member Joy.

The first script-reading took place on January 21, 2017. The second script-reading featuring the main cast took place on February 8, 2017, at CJ E&M Center in Sangam-dong, Seoul, South Korea.

== Awards and nominations ==
| Year | Award | Category | Recipient | Result |
|---|---|---|---|---|
| 2017 | OSEN Cable TV Awards | Newcomer Award | Joy (Park Sooyoung) | Won |
| 2017 | CJ AWARDS 2017 America Award | Best TvN Drama | The Liar and His Lover | Won |

== Original soundtrack ==
The Liar and His Lover OST Album

Soundtrack album by Various Artists
- Released: May 15, 2017
- Genre: Soundtrack
- Languages: Korean, English
- Label: CJ E&M Music

| No. | Title | Artist(s) | Length |
|---|---|---|---|
| 1. | "Yeowooya" (여우야 (女雨夜)) | Joy | 03:55 |
| 2. | "I'm Okay" (괜찮아, 난) | Joy feat. Lee Hyun-woo | 03:09 |
| 3. | "I'm Okay" (괜찮아, 난) | Crude Play | 04:00 |
| 4. | "Peterpan" | Crude Play | 03:27 |
| 5. | "Your Days" (요즘 너 말야) | Joy | 03:51 |
| 6. | "Shiny Boy" | Joy | 03:24 |
| 7. | "Counting Stars at Night" (별 헤는 밤) | Hong Seo-young | 04:06 |
| 8. | "Yesterday, Today and Tomorrow" (어제 오늘 내일) | Hong Seo-young | 03:30 |
| 9. | "In Your Eyes" | Crude Play | 03:30 |
| 10. | "Waiting for You" (너를 기다리는 법) | Joy | 03:22 |
| 11. | "The Road to Me" (내게 오는 길) | Joy | 04:11 |
| 12. | "Producer K" | Choi In-young | 02:42 |
| 13. | "Our Youth" (우리들의 청춘) | Hwang Sang-joon | 02:18 |
| 14. | "Fall for Han Gyul" (한결에게 반하다) | Park Eun-ji | 03:01 |
| 15. | "Sing It, Yoon So Rim" (노래해, 윤소림) | Lee A-ram | 03:45 |
| 16. | "First Meet with Han Kang" (한강 첫 만남) | Hwang Sang-joon | 01:54 |
| 17. | "This Is First Love" (첫사랑이에요) | Park Eun-ji | 03:09 |
| 18. | "Challenge" | Lee A-ram | 02:31 |
| 19. | "Grandma and Me" (할머니와 나) | Choi In-young | 03:48 |
| 20. | "With You" (너랑 같이) | Lee A-ram | 03:07 |
| 21. | "Heart Grows" (마음이 자꾸 커져서) | Park Eun-ji | 03:25 |
| 22. | "Run, Now" (달려가, 지금) | Choi In-young | 02:39 |
| 23. | "Miss You, Han Gyul" (보고 싶어요 한결씨) | Hwang Sang-joon | 01:59 |
| 24. | "Mushroom Girl, So Rim" (버섯소녀 소림) | Park Eun-ji | 02:22 |
| Total length: | | | 1:17:05 |

OST Part 1–9

=== Part 1 ===
| No. | Title | Lyrics | Music | Artist | Length |
|---|---|---|---|---|---|
| 1. | "Yeowooya" (여우야) | Kim Kwang-jin | Kim Kwang-jin | Joy | 03:55 |
| 2. | "Yeowooya" (Inst.) | | Kim Kwang-jin | | 03:55 |
| Total length: | | | | | 07:50 |

=== Part 2 ===
| No. | Title | Lyrics | Music | Artist | Length |
|---|---|---|---|---|---|
| 1. | "I'm Okay" (난 괜찮아) | Hwang Sang-joon; Kim Kyung-min | Shin Hyung; MONSTER NO.9 | Joy feat. Lee Hyun-woo | 03:09 |
| 2. | "I'm Okay" (Inst.) | | Shin Hyung; MONSTER NO.9 | | 03:09 |
| Total length: | | | | | 06:18 |

=== Part 3 ===
| No. | Title | Lyrics | Music | Artist | Length |
|---|---|---|---|---|---|
| 1. | "I'm OK" (괜찮아, 난) | Kim Kyung-min; Taibian | Shin Hyung; Hwang Sang-joon | Crude Play | 04:00 |
| 2. | "Peterpan" | Lee Jin-hee; Taibian | Junjaman; Hwang Sang-joon | Crude Play | 03:27 |
| Total length: | | | | | 07:27 |

=== Part 4 ===
| No. | Title | Lyrics | Music | Artist | Length |
|---|---|---|---|---|---|
| 1. | "Your Days" (요즘 너 말야) | Jung Da-un; Jung Hye-sun | Jung Da-un | Joy | 03:51 |
| 2. | "Your Days" (Inst.) | | Jung Da-un | | 03:51 |
| Total length: | | | | | 07:42 |

=== Part 5 ===
| No. | Title | Lyrics | Music | Artist | Length |
|---|---|---|---|---|---|
| 1. | "Shiny Boy" | Choi In-young | Choi In-young | Joy | 03:24 |
| 2. | "Shiny Boy" (Inst.) | | Choi In-young | | 03:24 |
| Total length: | | | | | 06:48 |

=== Part 6 ===
| No. | Title | Lyrics | Music | Artist | Length |
|---|---|---|---|---|---|
| 1. | "Counting Stars at Night" (별 헤는 밤) | Cosmic Sound; Premium Project | Cosmic Sound; Premium Project; Bloodmoon | Hong Seo-young | 04:06 |
| 2. | "Yesterday, Today and Tomorrow" (어제 오늘 내일) | Taibian | Shin Hyung | Hong Seo-young | 03:30 |
| Total length: | | | | | 07:36 |

=== Part 7 ===
| No. | Title | Lyrics | Music | Artist | Length |
|---|---|---|---|---|---|
| 1. | "In Your Eyes" | Frants; Young K | Frants | Crude Play | 03:30 |
| 2. | "In Your Eyes" (Inst.) | | Frants | | 03:30 |
| Total length: | | | | | 07:00 |

=== Part 8 ===
| No. | Title | Lyrics | Music | Artist | Length |
|---|---|---|---|---|---|
| 1. | "Waiting for You" (너를 기다리는 법) | Raphael | Raphael | Joy | 03:22 |
| 2. | "Waiting for You" (Inst.) | | Raphael | | 03:22 |
| Total length: | | | | | 06:44 |

=== Part 9 ===
| No. | Title | Lyrics | Music | Artist | Length |
|---|---|---|---|---|---|
| 1. | "The Way to Me" (내게 오는 길) | Yang Jae-sun | Kim Hyung-suk; Lee Sang-hun | Joy | 04:11 |
| 2. | "The Way to Me" (Inst.) | | Kim Hyung-suk; Lee Sang-hun | | 04:11 |
| Total length: | | | | | 08:22 |

=== Charted songs ===
Chart performance

| Title | Year | Peak chart positions | Sales | Remarks |
| Title | Year | KOR Gaon | Sales | Remarks |
|---|---|---|---|---|
| "Yeowooya" (Joy (Red Velvet)) | 2017 | 43 | KOR: 81,837+ | Part 1 |
| "I'm Okay" (Joy feat. Lee Hyun-woo) | 2017 | 85 | KOR: 22,513 | Part 2 |

Album

| Title | Album details | Peak chart positions | Sales |
| Title | Album details | KOR | Sales |
|---|---|---|---|
| The Liar and His Lover OST | Released: May 15, 2017; Label: CJ E&M; Formats: CD, digital download | 11 | KOR: 2,960 |

== Ratings ==
- In this table, the blue numbers represent the lowest ratings and the red numbers represent the highest ratings.
- N/A denotes that the rating is not known.

| Ep. | Original broadcast date | Average audience share | | |
| Ep. | Original broadcast date | AGB Nielsen | | TNmS |
| Ep. | Original broadcast date | Nationwide | Seoul | Nationwide |
|---|---|---|---|---|
| 1 | March 20, 2017 | 1.524% | 1.707% | 2.0% |
| 2 | March 21, 2017 | 1.345% | 1.427% | 1.7% |
| 3 | March 27, 2017 | 1.267% | 1.765% | 1.3% |
| 4 | March 28, 2017 | 1.839% | 2.309% | 1.7% |
| 5 | April 3, 2017 | 1.435% | 1.775% | 1.7% |
| 6 | April 4, 2017 | 1.460% | 1.506% | 1.2% |
| 7 | April 10, 2017 | 1.693% | 2.012% | 1.7% |
| 8 | April 11, 2017 | 1.623% | 1.828% | 1.7% |
| 9 | April 17, 2017 | 1.494% | 1.839% | 1.3% |
| 10 | April 18, 2017 | 1.433% | 1.719% | 1.2% |
| 11 | April 24, 2017 | 1.384% | 1.641% | 1.2% |
| 12 | April 25, 2017 | 1.592% | 2.015% | 1.4% |
| 13 | May 1, 2017 | 1.387% | 1.609% | 1.0% |
| 14 | May 2, 2017 | 1.550% | 1.736% | 1.8% |
| 15 | May 8, 2017 | 1.227% | —N/a | 1.8% |
| 16 | May 9, 2017 | 1.379% | 1.501% | 1.4% |
| Average | | 1.482% | 1.754% | 1.5% |

- This drama airs on a cable channel/pay TV which normally has a relatively smaller audience compared to free-to-air TV/public broadcasters (KBS, SBS, MBC and EBS).

== See also ==
- The Liar and His Lover, 2013 Japanese film
