= Blossom Entertainment =

Korean talent management agency

- Native name: 블러썸 엔터테인먼트
- Company type: Private
- Industry: Talent Agency
- Founded: March 2012 (As Blossom Entertainment Co., Ltd.)
- Headquarters: 6F, Uno Building, 112-18, Nonhyeon-dong, Gangnam-gu, Seoul, South Korea
- Key people: Ju Bang-ok (CEO & co-founder); Seung Byeong-ok (GM); Kim Jeong-yong (Director)
- Subsidiaries: Blossom Creative; Blossom Pictures; Blossom Story
- Website: Blossom Entertainment

Blossom Entertainment (Korean: 블러썸 엔터테인먼트) is a talent management agency based in Seoul, South Korea.

== Foundation ==
Blossom Entertainment was co-founded by actor Cha Tae-hyun and his agent Ju Bang-ok in March 2012 after their respective contracts expired from Sidus HQ.

== Artists ==
=== Current ===
- Han Soo-ah
- Hyun Jun
- Jung Eui-jae
- Jung Gun-joo
- Kim Su-an
- Lee You-jin
- Nam Do-yoon
- Son Chang-min
- Song Jong-ho

=== Former ===
- Cha Tae-hyun
- Chae Sang-woo
- Han Sang-jin
- Jung Moon-sung
- Jung So-min
- Kim Bo-ryoung
- Kim Gun-woo
- Kim Min-chul
- Ko Chang-seok
- Kwak Sun-young
- Kwon So-hyun
- Lee Gwang-hun
- Lee Seo-won
- Lim Ju-hwan (2013–2024)
- Park Bo-gum
- Shin Seung-hwan
- Son Seung-won
- Song Joong-ki
- Yang Se-jong

== Filmography ==
=== Serials ===
All produced by subsidiary Blossom Story unless otherwise noted

Title	Premiere	Seasons	Network	Notes
Flower Crew: Joseon Marriage Agency	September 16, 2019	1 season, 16 episodes	JTBC	Co-produced with JP E&M
The Good Detective	July 6, 2020	1 season, 16 episodes	JTBC	Co-produced with JTBC Studios
Kairos	October 26, 2020	1 season, 16 episodes	MBC TV	Co-produced with O.H. Story
Get Revenge	November 21, 2020	1 season, 16 episodes	TV Chosun	Co-produced with HIGROUND and Story Hunter Production

=== Films ===
All produced by subsidiary Blossom Pictures unless otherwise noted

Title	Premiere	Format	Distributor	Notes
Warriors of the Dawn	May 31, 2017	Live action	20th Century Fox	Co-produced with REALies Pictures, 20th Century Fox Korea and Verdi Media
Dark Figure of Crime	October 3, 2018	Live action	Showbox	Co-produced with 295 Films
Miracle: Letters to the President	June 2021	Fantasy, romantic drama	Lotte Entertainment	

== Recognition ==
Year	Award	Category	Recipient	Result	Ref.
2016	5th APAN Star Awards	Best Manager	Blossom Entertainment (Kim Jeong-yong)	Won	
