= The Liar and His Lover (film) =

2013 Japanese film

- Official Poster
- Kanji: カノジョは嘘を愛しすぎてる
- Revised Hepburn: Kanojo wa Uso o Aishisugiteru
- Directed by: Norihiro Koizumi
- Written by: Kotomi Aoki; Tomoko Yoshida; Norihiro Koizumi
- Produced by: Takashi Ishihara; Tatsuro Hatanaka; Shinichiro Tsuzuki; Minami Ichikawa; Takaaki Kada; Ken Tsuchiya; Kazuyoshi Ishida
- Starring: Takeru Satoh; Sakurako Ohara
- Cinematography: Hiro Yanagida
- Music by: Seiji Kameda
- Production company: Fuji TV
- Distributed by: Toho
- Release date: December 14, 2013
- Running time: 116 minutes
- Country: Japan
- Language: Japanese
- Box office: US$15.9 million

The Liar and His Lover (カノジョは嘘を愛しすぎてる, Kanojo wa Uso o Aishisugiteru) is a 2013 Japanese musical romance film starring Takeru Satoh and Sakurako Ohara. It is based on the Shōjo manga of the same name by Kotomi Aoki.

== Plot ==
The film follows a successful, yet reclusive music composer named Aki Ogasawara who becomes involved in a relationship with a 16-year-old fan on a whim while lying about his true identity. Eventually, she gets recruited into the music industry herself, causing additional complications.

== Cast ==
=== Main ===
- Takeru Satoh as Aki Ogasawara

A 25-year-old genius producer and bassist, who composes for the rock band Crude Play under the alias Soichiro. He used to be a band member with his three other childhood friends, but left the band right before their debut. He becomes depressed and tries to find solace through music.

- Sakurako Ohara as Riko Koeda

A 16-year-old high school student who possesses a gifted voice. She is in an amateur band Mush & Co. with two of her childhood friends. Riko meets and falls in love with Aki at first sight, and tries to help him overcome his pain.

=== Supporting ===
- Shohei Miura as Shun Sakaguchi, guitarist and vocalist of "Crude Play"
- Masataka Kubota as Shinya Shinohara, bassist of Crude Play who replaced Aki's position
- Kouki Mizuta as Kaoru Ono, guitarist of Crude Play.
- Koudai Asaka as Teppei Yazaki, drummer of Crude Play.
- Ryo Yoshizawa as Yuichi Kimijima, member of Mush & Co.
- Yuki Morinaga as Sota Yamazaki, member of Mush & Co.
- Saki Aibu as Mari, Aki's ex-girlfriend
- Takashi Sorimachi as Soichiro Takagi, music producer and Aki's rival
- Mitsuki Tanimura as Miwako Nagahama, Takagi's assistant
- Maxwell Powers as Master of Ceremonies

== Production ==
The live adaptation of the film was first announced in March 2012. Auditions were held from March to June of the same year to choose the female lead, Riko.

== Soundtrack ==
No.	Title	Artist(s)	Length
1.	"Insecticide"	Crude Play	3:43
2.	"明日も" (Ashita mo)	Mush & Co.	4:13
3.	"サヨナラの準備は、もうできていた" (Sayonara no Junbi wa mou Dekiteita)	Crude Play	4:00
4.	"卒業" (Sotsugyō)	Crude Play	3:47
5.	"うたうたいのうた" (Uta tai no Uta)	Happo Stirolls	2:53
6.	"明日も - アコースティック ver." (Ashita mo (Acoustic ver.))	Riko Koeda and Shinya Shinohara	4:29
7.	"祈り" (Inori)	Mari	4:39
8.	"卒業 - アコースティック ver." (Sotsugyō (Acoustic ver.))	Riko Koeda and Aki Ogasawara	2:05
9.	"ちっぽけな愛のうた" (Chippokena Ai no Uta)	Riko Koeda and Aki Ogasawara	6:08
10.	"春姉ちゃんを幸せにしなかったらぶっ飛ばすの歌" (Haru Nēchan o Shiawaseni Shinakattara Buttobasu no Uta)	Aki Ogasawara (Piano Solo)	4:12
Total length:			40:09

== Prologue ==
A prologue drama series, titled A Story of Before She and I Met was aired on Fuji TV from December 9 for 10 episodes, with each episode lasting 10 minutes.

== Box-office ==
By December 2013, the film had earned ¥164 million (US$1.59 million). By January 19, 2014, it had grossed ¥1.58 billion (US$15.13 million).

== See also ==
- The Liar and His Lover (TV series), 2017 South Korean television series
- Sakurako Ohara
