= Boku wa Imōto ni Koi o Suru =

Japanese manga series

- First tankōbon volume cover, featuring Yori Yuki

僕は妹に恋をする
- Genre: Romantic drama
- Manga
- Written by: Kotomi Aoki
- Published by: Shogakukan
- Magazine: Shōjo Comic
- Original run: May 26, 2003 – August 26, 2005
- Volumes: 10
- Original video animation

Boku wa Imōto ni Koi o Suru: Secret Sweethearts – Kono Koi wa Himitsu
- Directed by: Mayumi Nishimoto
- Studio: Shogakukan; Vega Entertainment; Zoom Enterprise
- Released: May 18, 2005
- Runtime: 50 minutes
- Manga

Boku no Hatsukoi o Kimi ni Sasagu
- Written by: Kotomi Aoki
- Published by: Shogakukan
- Magazine: Shōjo Comic
- Original run: December 20, 2005 – August 26, 2008
- Volumes: 12
- Live-action film
- Directed by: Hiroshi Ando
- Produced by: Youichiro Onishi
- Written by: Hiroshi Ando; Saeki Nejime
- Music by: Otomo Yoshihide
- Studio: Shogakukan; Toshiba Entertainment; Zoom Enterprise; Nippon Television
- Released: January 20, 2007
- Runtime: 122 minutes

Boku wa Imōto ni Koi o Suru (僕は妹に恋をする; lit. I'm in love with my sister; abbreviated to BokuImo) is a Japanese manga series written and illustrated by Kotomi Aoki. Originally serialized in the magazine Shōjo Comic, its chapters were published in ten tankōbon volumes by Shogakukan from May 2003 to August 2005. The series focuses on fraternal twins Yori and Iku, who fall in love with one another despite being siblings.

A ten volume spin-off series focusing on Yori's upperclassmen Takuma Kakinouchi and his childhood sweetheart Mayu Taneda was serialized in Shōjo Comic from December 2005 through August 2008. It is called Boku no Hatsukoi o Kimi ni Sasagu (abbreviated to BokuKimi) and means "I Give My First Love to You". The manga series was adapted into a one-episode original video animation (OVA) that was released in May 2005 and a live-action film starring Jun Matsumoto and Nana Eikura that premiered in Japan on January 20, 2007.

As of May 2006, the manga had over 2.5 million copies in circulation. In 2008, Boku no Hatsukoi o Kimi ni Sasagu won the 53rd Shogakukan Manga Award for the shōjo category.

== Plot ==
Twin siblings, brother Yori Yuki and sister Iku Yuki, had been extremely close since childhood. However, Yori's feelings toward Iku were more than innocent affection, and only grew stronger over time. Ashamed, Yori distances himself from Iku by pursuing a relationship with Iku's friend Tomoka Kusunoki and plans to transfer to an out-of-town high school. This does nothing to help him forget his lust for his sister, and when the twins get into an argument, Yori confesses his love to Iku. She initially rejects his advances, but fearing rejection may drive him away, she reluctantly kisses him. Yori tells her to wait until she is sure of her love for him, and over the next several days, they try to begin a more intimate relationship, hidden from their parents.

Iku is torn between guilt at committing incest and her desire to remain together with Yori. However, when she discovers both Yori's relationship with Tomoka and his plans to leave, Iku realizes that she has fallen in love with him. She confesses to Yori, who accepts her feelings, breaking off his relationship with Tomoka. The twins then enter into a sexual relationship, and Yori is torn between elation and guilt. He maintains his plans to transfer to a different school, as he believes staying would prevent the two from acting like a normal couple. He suggests to Iku that they could keep their relationship if they lived somewhere no one knew them. Iku reluctantly agrees to let him go, with the promise that they will stay in touch.

Yori arrives at his new high school, while Iku begins living under the care of Yori's friend Haruka Yano and attending classes at a different school. Haruka is aware of their relationship and helps them meet in secret, but also begins to fall in love with Iku. When Haruka ultimately confesses to Iku, though, she rejects him. Tomoka is also enrolled at Yori's new school and tries to reinitiate their relationship, but he rejects her. Consequently, Tomoka plans her revenge against Yori. She attempts to get the twins caught visiting each other, and to blackmail Yori into sleeping with her. Although her attempts fail, she continues to plot against them, culminating in an attempt to have Iku raped by a group of classmates. In the process, Iku's visits are revealed, causing Yori to be expelled.

Yori transfers into Iku's high school, where they meet Yuugo Azusa, the daughter of one of their parents' friends, Dr. Yuugo Mori. She resembles Yori more than Iku, and when her father invites the Yuki family over to his house, Yori begins to suspect that Dr. Yuugo may have had an affair with his mother. Dr. Yuugo soon confesses that he has been in love with Yori's mother since college and believes that he is Yori's biological father. He secretly confirms his suspicions with a DNA test. When confronted, the twins' mother admits to knowing that Yori is Yuugo's son, having kept it a secret out of fear of ruining her family. Suspecting that Iku was adopted, and therefore not biologically related to him, Yori then reveals their relationship. Their mother insists that they are in fact siblings, and eventually reveals that they are in fact half-twins, the result of heteropaternal superfecundation. Iku is the daughter of her husband, while Yori is the son of Yuugo Mori.

To avoid being separated, Yori and Iku run away from home with Haruka's help. While in hiding, Yori finally chooses to end their relationship and reconcile with their parents. He ultimately leaves the family to go somewhere he can never be found, hoping that his and Iku's feelings will fade away. Iku falls into a deep depression and resolves to find him again, no matter how long it takes. Ten years later, Iku is a sales representative for a company owned by Haruka, from whom she has rejected several marriage proposals. During a trip to England, she encounters Yori once again; when they recognize each other, they embrace, and Yori asserts that he is still in love with Iku.

== Characters ==
- Yori Yuki (結城 頼, Yūki Yori) (Voiced by: Shotaro Morikubo, Portrayed by: Jun Matsumoto): The male lead, is Iku's older twin brother. He is intelligent and somewhat cold, but has a hidden soft side, especially for Iku. Yori is later revealed to be Iku's half-twin brother, as he was fathered by Dr. Yuugo, who slept with their mother on the day of her wedding.
- Iku Yuki (結城 郁, Yūki Iku): (Voiced by: Mai Nakahara, Portrayed by: Nana Eikura) The female lead, she is Yori's younger twin sister. In contrast to Yori, she is dense and clumsy, but has a determined spirit. She loves Yori deeply and is very loyal to him. She is later revealed to be Yori's half-twin sister, fathered by their mother's husband Shunpei.
- Haruka Yano (矢野 立芳, Yano Haruka): (Voiced by: Kosuke Toriumi, Portrayed by: Yuta Hiraoka) Yori's best friend from junior high school. He and Yori have similar personalities and intelligence. He knows about the twins' incestuous relationship, but keeps it a secret. He falls in love with Iku after Yori leaves for high school, though she rejects him.
- Tomoka Kusunoki (楠 友華, Kusunoki Tomoka): (Voiced by: Tomoko Kawakami, Portrayed by: Ayaka Komatsu) Iku's best friend from junior high school. She has a huge crush on Yori and even slept with him. However, he rejects her after starting a relationship with Iku. She is unsuccessful in either ending the twins' relationship or in resuming her own relationship with Yori.
- Saki Yuki (結城 咲, Yūki Saki): (Voiced by: Sakiko Tamagawa) Yori's and Iku's mother. Although very loving to both of her children, she becomes suspicious of their "friendliness." She reveals that on her wedding night, she had sex with her husband's best friend Dr. Yuugo, and then slept with her husband Shunpei in an attempt to forget about the betrayal. As a result, Yori was fathered by Yuugo, while Iku was fathered by Shunpei.
- Shunpei Yuki (結城 俊平, Yuki Shunpei): (Voiced by: Tōru Furusawa) Yori and Iku's father and Saki's husband, who is revealed to be the biological father of only Iku.

== Media ==
=== Manga ===
Written and illustrated by Kotomi Aoki, Boku wa Imōto ni Koi o Suru was originally serialized in Japan in Shōjo Comic. The individual chapters were collected and published in ten tankōbon volumes by Shogakukan, with the first volume released May 26, 2003, and the last volume published on August 26, 2008. The series is licensed for regional language releases in France by Soleil Productions under the English title Secret Sweetheart, in Spain by Editorial Ivrea, and in Taiwan by Ever Glory Publishing. The original volumes were also imported to the United States and sold as is by Borders and Waldenbooks bookstores in early 2005. In March 2008, to celebrate its 40th anniversary, Shōjo Comic posted free chapters of Boku wa Imōto ni Koi o Suru on its website, along with a new side story.

A spin-off series, Boku no Hatsukoi o Kimi ni Sasagu (僕の初恋をキミに捧ぐ; lit. 'I Offer You My First Love'), began serialization in Shōjo Comic simultaneously in 2005. Focusing on Yori's upperclassmen Takuma Kakinouchi and his childhood sweetheart Mayu Taneda, the series ran until mid-2008. Shogakukan published the individual chapters across twelve tankōbon volumes, with the first released on December 20, 2005, and the last on August 26, 2008.

=== Original video animation ===
Boku wa Imōto ni Koi o Suru: Secret Sweethearts – Kono Koi wa Himitsu (僕は妹に恋をする シークレット・スウィートハート この恋はひみつ; lit. 'I'm in Love with my Little Sister: Secret Sweethearts – This Love is a Secret') is the original video animation (OVA) adaptation of the manga. On May 18, 2005, Shogakukan released a DVD of the OVA. Directed by Mayumi Nishimoto, the hour-long, one-episode OVA used the song "Ai ga Hoshii" (愛が欲しい; lit. 'Desired Love') by Shion as its ending theme.

=== Live action film ===
My Sister, My Love (poster)

The manga was adapted into a live action film by Toshiba Entertainment. My Sister, My Love was directed by Hiroshi Ando and produced by Shogakukan, Toshiba Entertainment, Zoom Enterprise and Nippon Television. It was released in Japan on January 20, 2007, and in Taiwan on June 1, 2007. The film features Jun Matsumoto as Yori Yuuki, Nana Eikura as Iku Yuuki, Ayaka Komatsu as Tomoka Kusunoki, Yuko Asano as Saki Yuuki and Yūta Hiraoka as Haruka Yano. The ending theme of the movie is "Kitto Eien ni" by Crystal Kay.

The spin-off series Boku no Hatsukoi o Kimi ni Sasagu was adapted into a film entitled I Give My First Love to You. The film was directed by Takehiko Shinjo and was released on October 24, 2009, in Japan. The story revolves around Takuma Kakinouchi, played by Masaki Okada, a boy who is told he will die before he is 20, and Mayu Taneda, played by Mao Inoue, the girl who is in love with him.

== Reception ==
=== Manga ===
Boku no Hatsukoi o Kimi ni Sasagu won the 53rd Shogakukan Manga Award for the shōjo category in 2008.

The first seven tankōbon volumes of Boku wa Imōto ni Koi o Suru sold over 2.5 million copies by May 2006. The seventh volume of Boku no Hatsukoi o Kimi ni Sasagu was ranked 5th on the Tohan charts between April 25 and May 1, 2007. The eighth volume was ranked 5th on the Tohan charts between July 24 and 30, 2007. The ninth volume was ranked 3rd on the Tohan charts between October 30 and November 5, 2007. The tenth volume was ranked 5th on the Tohan charts between January 22 and 28, 2008, and 1st between January 29 and February 4, 2008. The eleventh volume was ranked 5th on the Tohan charts between April 22 and 28, 2008, and 4th between April 29 and March 5, 2008. The twelve volume was ranked 4th on the Tohan charts between August 26 and September 1, 2008.

A reviewer for Manga News described the first volume of the manga as "a mature shojo, appealing and rather captivating." A review of the second volume of the manga commends the author's art as "very pretty." It also comments that the incestuous relationship "between those two brother and sister is sometimes pushed a bit too far, but that also gives charm to the character." PlaneteBD's Faustine Lillaz commented that the manga's art "barely saves the day. The trait is fine and the style rather pure and the background details are rarely present and when they are it is only to reinforce the forbidden aspect of Iku's and Yori's relationship (church, bedroom with parents outside)." Anime News Network described the manga as "Yori and Iku basically spend each chapter getting dangerously close with each other, often in explicit ways, and this smut is repeated over and over until you just want to read some conservative, pedantic pre-Tezuka shōjo manga about how little Chieko became a good obedient wife and waits every day to serve dinner to her salaryman husband because he gets so tired from perpetuating the Japanese economic miracle".

=== Anime ===
Carlos Ross of THEM Anime Reviews criticized the hour length of the OVA, feeling its compression of the original manga story caused Yori's feelings for his sister to seem "extremely abrupt and out of left field". Noting that the OVA adaptation departed from the usual "incest taboo" setup, Ross considered the premise "Freudian" and "very unrealistic." Though he found the animation itself average, Ross praised the background art as varying "from gorgeous to amazing."
