= Kotomi Aoki =

Japanese manga artist (born 1980)

Kotomi Aoki 青木 琴美
- Born: January 7, 1980 (age 46) Matsuyama, Ehime, Japan
- Area: Manga artist
- Notable works: Boku wa Imōto ni Koi o Suru; Boku no Hatsukoi o Kimi ni Sasagu
- Awards: 53rd Shogakukan Manga Award for shōjo manga for Boku no Hatsukoi o Kimi ni Sasagu

Kotomi Aoki (Japanese: 青木 琴美, Hepburn: Aoki Kotomi; born January 7, 1980) is a Japanese manga artist residing in Matsuyama, Ehime, Japan. She received the 2008 Shogakukan Manga Award for shōjo manga for Boku no Hatsukoi o Kimi ni Sasagu. Kotomi took her 2013 manga, Kanojo wa Uso o Aishisugiteru, and remade a new version that was released in 2017. It was also adapted into both a 2013 Japanese film and a 2017 South Korean TV series.

== Works ==
- Asa mo, Hiru mo, Yoru mo (Morning, Noon and Night)
- Ashita, Anata ga Mezame tara
- Boku no Hatsukoi o Kimi ni Sasagu
- Boku wa Imōto ni Koi o Suru
- Ijiwaru Shinaide!
- Taiyou ga Ippai
  - Aishikata mo Wakarazuni
- Jesus!
- Kanojo wa Uso o Aishisugiteru
- Kare wa Ike mo Shinai Kōshien wo Mezasu
- Koisuru Heart ga No to Iu
  - Love and Tears
  - Motto Ikitai..
