= Hong Gildong =

Hong Gildong or Hong Gil-dong may refer to:

- Hong Gil-dong (outlaw), a historical 14th–15th century outlaw
- Hong Gildong jeon (lit. The Story of Hong Gildong), a 16th or 17th century Korean novel
- Hong Kil-dong (1986 film), North Korean film based on the novel
- Hong Gil-dong (2008 South Korean TV series)
- The Rebel (2017 South Korean TV series)
- A common Korean placeholder name based on the lead character of the novel, used similarly to John Doe
- Operation Hong Kil Dong
