= 10th Korea Drama Awards =

2017 edition of award ceremony

- Date: October 2, 2017
- Site: Gyeongnam Culture and Art Center, Jinju, South Gyeongsang Province
- Hosted by: Shin Young-il; Park Gyu-ri

The 10th Korea Drama Awards is an awards ceremony for excellence in television in South Korea. It was held at the Gyeongnam Culture and Art Center in Jinju, South Gyeongsang Province on October 2, 2017. The nominees were chosen from Korean dramas that aired from October 2016 to September 2017.

== Nominations and winners ==
(Winners denoted in bold)

Grand Prize (Daesang)	Best Drama
**Kim Sang-joong** - **The Rebel**; Cha In-pyo - The Gentlemen of Wolgyesu Tailor Shop; Choi Min-soo - Man Who Dies to Live; Han Suk-kyu - Dr. Romantic; Kim Yeong-cheol - My Father is Strange	**The Emperor: Owner of the Mask** (MBC); **Guardian: The Lonely and Great God** (tvN); Good Manager (KBS2); Love in the Moonlight (KBS2); The Rebel (MBC)
Best Production Director	Best Screenplay
**Lee Jang-soo** - **Good Manager**; Kim Jin-man - The Rebel; Kim Sung-yoon - Love in the Moonlight; Lee Eung-bok - Guardian: The Lonely and Great God; Noh Do-cheol - The Emperor: Owner of the Mask	**Park Hye-jin** - **The Emperor: Owner of the Mask**; Hwang Jin-young - The Rebel; Kim Eun-sook - Guardian: The Lonely and Great God; Kim Min-jeong - Love in the Moonlight; Lee Eun-jin - Good Manager
Top Excellence Award, Actor	Top Excellence Award, Actress
**Kim Ji-seok** - **The Rebel**; **Kwon Yul** - **Whisper**; Lee Dong-wook - Guardian: The Lonely and Great God; Namkoong Min - Good Manager; Park Bo-gum - Love in the Moonlight	**Lee Ha-nui** - **The Rebel**; Gong Hyo-jin - Don't Dare to Dream; Im Yoon-ah - The King in Love; Kang Ye-won - Man Who Dies to Live; Kim Go-eun - Guardian: The Lonely and Great God
Excellence Award, Actor	Excellence Award, Actress
**Jeon No-min** - **The Emperor: Owner of the Mask**; **Min Jin-woong** - **My Father is Strange**; Ahn Jae-hong - Fight for My Way; Lee Ki-woo - The Lady in Dignity; Yoon Kyun-sang - The Rebel	**Lee Il-hwa** - **Good Manager**; **Song Ha-yoon** - **Fight for My Way**; Nam Ji-hyun - Suspicious Partner; Park Se-young - Whisper; Yoo In-na - Guardian: The Lonely and Great God
Best New Actor	Best New Actress
**Yook Sung-jae** - **Guardian: The Lonely and Great God**; Jung Jin-young - Love in the Moonlight; Kim Myung-soo - The Emperor: Owner of the Mask; Kwak Dong-yeon - Love in the Moonlight; Nam Joo-hyuk - Weightlifting Fairy Kim Bok-joo	**Ko Won-hee** - **Strongest Deliveryman**; Kim Se-jeong - School 2017; Lee Se-young - The Gentlemen of Wolgyesu Tailor Shop; Park Eun-bin - Father, I'll Take Care of You; Seohyun - Bad Thief, Good Thief
Best Original Soundtrack	KDA Award
**"Must Be The Money" (DinDin)** - **Good Manager**; "Beautiful" (Crush) - Guardian: The Lonely and Great God; "Because I Love You" (Gummy) - My Sassy Girl; "Dreaming Now" (Son Dong-woon) - Innocent Defendant; "I Miss You" (Soyou) - Guardian: The Lonely and Great God	**Huh Joon-ho** - **The Emperor: Owner of the Mask**
Lifetime Achievement Award	Hallyu Star Award
**Jung Young-sook** - **Dal Soon's Spring**	**Kwon Mina** - **Hospital Ship**; **Park Gyu-ri** - **Lovers in Bloom**
Hot Star Award	Star of the Year Award
**Lee Tae-im** - **The Lady in Dignity**	**Yook Sung-jae** - **Guardian: The Lonely and Great God**
Popular Character Award	Global Management Award
**Kim Byung-chul** - **Guardian: The Lonely and Great God**; **Park Kyung-hye** - **Guardian: The Lonely and Great God**	**Cube Entertainment**
