= Bad Thief, Good Thief =

2017 South Korean television series

- Promotional poster
- Also known as: The Good Thieves
- Hangul: 도둑놈, 도둑님
- Lit.: Thief Guy, Mr. Thief
- RR: Dodungnom, dodungnim
- MR: Todungnom, todungnim
- Genre: Procedural; Romantic comedy; Crime
- Created by: Lee Jae-Dong
- Written by: Son Young-mok; Cha Yi-young
- Directed by: Oh Kyung-hoon; Jang Joon-ho
- Starring: Ji Hyun-woo; Seohyun; Kim Ji-hoon; Lim Ju-eun
- Music by: Oh Jun-Seong
- Country of origin: South Korea
- Original language: Korean
- No. of episodes: 50

Production
- Executive producer: Kim Jin-cheon
- Running time: 70 minutes
- Production company: May Queen Pictures

Original release
- Network: MBC TV
- Release: May 13 – November 5, 2017

Bad Thief, Good Thief (Korean: 도둑놈, 도둑님) is a 2017 South Korean television series starring Ji Hyun-woo, Seohyun, Kim Ji-hoon, Lim Ju-eun and others. It replaced Father, I'll Take Care For You and aired on MBC on Saturdays and Sundays at 22:00 (KST) from May 13 to November 5, 2017 for 50 episodes.

== Plot ==
The story of the descendants of the Korean activists during the Japanese colonial rule who became the important figures of the history. They were unaware of their identity as it will harm their lives.

== Cast ==
=== Main cast ===
- Ji Hyun-woo as Jang Dol-mok / Kim Soo-hyun
  - Kim Kang-hoon as young Jang Dol-mok

Baek-san's descendant and an Olympic-level fencer. His identity is hidden by his foster father as he is the key to find the treasure map. He is also a vigilante who specializes in exposing corruptions of the upper-class.

- Seohyun as Kang So-joo
  - Moon So-hee as young Kang So-joo

A police-woman-turned-investigator who struggles to fight against the abusive officials.

- Kim Ji-hoon as Han Joon-hee / Jang Min-jae
  - Nam Da-reum as young Jang Min-jae
  - Moon Woo-jin as child Jang Min-jae

Dol-mok's missing adopted brother. He holds grudges because of his bitter past and vows to change his ill-fated life. Eventually, he becomes a prosecutor who seeks to gain power in the legal ladders to take down corrupted powerful people.

- Lim Ju-eun as Yoon Hwa-young
  - Kang Ji-woo as young Yoon Hwa-young

So-joo's friend turns enemy. A wolf in sheep's clothing. She likes to get everyone's attention. She appears to like Joon-hee but only actually frustrated because he shows no signs of liking her.

=== Supporting ===
==== People around Jang Dol-mok ====
- Ahn Gil-kang as Jang Pan-soo
- Jung Kyung-soon as Park Ha-kyung
- Shin Eun-jung as Min Hae-won

==== People around Kang So-joo ====
- Kim Jung-tae as Kang Sung-il, So Joo's father

==== Yoon Joong-tae's family and Hong family ====
- Choi Jong-hwan as Yoon Joong-tae
- Choi Su-rin as Hong Shin-ae
- Jang Gwang as Hong Il-kwon
- Seo Yi-sook as Hong Mi-ae
- Kim Jin-ho as Lee Chang-young
- … as Yang Ki-young
- Han Jae-suk as Lee Yoon-ho
  - Jeon Jin-seo as young Lee Yoon-ho
- Han Jung-soo as Choi Tae-suk

==== Extended ====
- Lee Joo-sil as Kim Soon-chun
- Lee Jung-eun as Kwon Jung-hee
- Woo Hee-jin as Park Sun-jin
- Lee Se-chang as Lee Eun-suk
- Lee Sang-woo as Oh Song-sik
- Yoon Ji-won as Go Eun-ji
- Ryu Ji-an as Park Yeo-wool
- Shorry J as Heo Jong-bum
- Kim Joon-won as Choi Kang-gyu
- Lee Bong-won as Nam Jong-hab
- Jo Duk-hyun as Kim Chan-gi
- Kang Ji-won as Secretary Heo
- Ko Byung-wan as Song Gook-hyun

=== Special appearances ===
- Kim Dae-sung
- Kim Young-hee
- Yoon Yong-hyun as Lee Chul-ho

== Ratings ==
In the table below, the blue numbers represent the lowest ratings and the red numbers represent the highest ratings.

Ep.	Date	Average audience share			
Ep.	Date	TNmS Ratings		AGB Nielsen	
Ep.	Date	Nationwide	Seoul	Nationwide	Seoul
1	May 13, 2017	8.7% (9th)	9.4% (7th)	9.1% (7th)	9.2% (7th)
2	May 14, 2017	9.6% (9th)	9.7% (8th)	8.9% (11th)	9.0% (11th)
3	May 20, 2017	6.8% (14th)	7.4% (7th)	6.6% (15th)	7.1% (11th)
4	May 21, 2017	8.8% (11th)	8.8% (13th)	9.4% (10th)	9.4% (10th)
5	May 27, 2017	9.7% (8th)	9.5% (5th)	9.5% (7th)	9.2% (7th)
6	May 28, 2017	11.0% (7th)	11.6% (4th)	11.6% (7th)	11.7% (7th)
7	June 3, 2017	8.9% (9th)	9.3% (5th)	10.4% (5th)	10.1% (5th)
8	June 4, 2017	10.4% (5th)	11.2% (6th)	10.7% (8th)	10.3% (10th)
9	June 10, 2017	9.4% (7th)	10.4% (5th)	10.8% (5th)	11.1% (3rd)
10	June 11, 2017	11.7% (5th)	11.5% (6th)	11.8% (6th)	11.9% (6th)
11	June 17, 2017	9.3% (6th)	9.6% (5th)	11.6% (5th)	12.1% (5th)
12	June 18, 2017	11.4% (5th)	11.2% (6th)	13.2% (4th)	12.7% (5th)
13	June 24, 2017	9.7% (6th)	10.4% (5th)	10.4% (6th)	10.3% (7th)
14	June 25, 2017	10.2% (7th)	9.8% (8th)	12.3% (5th)	12.1% (6th)
15	July 1, 2017	8.5% (11th)	9.6% (5th)	10.9% (5th)	11.3% (5th)
16	July 2, 2017	11.3% (7th)	11.9% (5th)	11.0% (10th)	11.0% (10th)
17	July 8, 2017	10.5% (8th)	11.2% (5th)	10.5% (5th)	10.6% (5th)
18	July 9, 2017	11.0% (9th)	11.8% (8th)	11.9% (7th)	11.4% (8th)
19	July 15, 2017	10.1% (6th)	10.9% (5th)	10.4% (6th)	10.4% (6th)
20	July 16, 2017	11.9% (8th)	12.9% (4th)	12.0% (9th)	12.1% (7th)
21	July 22, 2017	10.5% (5th)	10.1% (6th)	9.9% (7th)	9.8% (6th)
22	July 23, 2017	11.3% (7th)	11.0% (9th)	11.3% (8th)	11.1% (10th)
23	July 29, 2017	10.1% (10th)	10.0% (6th)	9.7% (7th)	9.5% (8th)
24	July 30, 2017	11.8% (5th)	11.7% (4th)	11.9% (5th)	11.5% (6th)
25	August 5, 2017	9.2% (8th)	9.6% (6th)	9.4% (8th)	9.0% (8th)
26	August 6, 2017	10.1% (9th)	10.3% (9th)	10.8% (8th)	10.5% (9th)
27	August 12, 2017	8.9% (9th)	8.4% (7th)	8.6% (10th)	8.4% (8th)
28	August 13, 2017	10.3% (9th)	10.5% (9th)	10.5% (8th)	10.2% (8th)
29	August 19, 2017	9.9% (6th)	9.8% (6th)	9.6% (8th)	9.6% (8th)
30	August 20, 2017	9.4% (9th)	9.2% (9th)	11.0% (9th)	10.8% (10th)
31	August 26, 2017	9.1% (7th)	8.2% (7th)	8.7% (9th)	8.6% (8th)
32	August 27, 2017	10.6% (9th)	9.9% (9th)	12.1% (6th)	12.1% (7th)
33	September 2, 2017	6.7% (19th)	6.7% (12th)	8.0% (12th)	7.9% (11th)
34	September 3, 2017	10.0% (7th)	10.0% (8th)	10.5% (8th)	10.2% (9th)
35	September 9, 2017	7.9% (11th)	7.6% (10th)	8.0% (10th)	7.6% (11th)
36	September 10, 2017	9.5% (7th)	8.1% (12th)	10.2% (8th)	9.9% (8th)
37	September 16, 2017	7.7% (14th)	7.9% (8th)	8.4% (12th)	8.1% (10th)
38	September 17, 2017	9.9% (6th)	9.6% (6th)	11.4% (4th)	10.6% (4th)
39	September 23, 2017	7.7% (11th)	6.6% (11th)	8.3% (7th)	8.0% (7th)
40	September 24, 2017	10.5% (5th)	10.6% (6th)	11.8% (4th)	11.2% (4th)
41	September 30, 2017	7.8% (13th)	7.5% (9th)	8.5% (10th)	8.4% (8th)
42	October 1, 2017	9.8% (6th)	9.8% (4th)	11.6% (4th)	10.9% (6th)
43	October 8, 2017 (Note: No episode was aired on October 7 due to a Mid-Autumn special. In return, two episodes were aired back-to-back that day.)	10.1% (6th)	10.3% (4th)	11.4% (5th)	11.6% (5th)
44	October 8, 2017	8.9% (7th)	8.8% (8th)	11.7% (4th)	11.7% (4th)
45	October 14, 2017	7.8% (11th)	7.6% (9th)	8.3% (10th)	7.8% (10th)
46	October 15, 2017	10.6% (6th)	9.7% (6th)	12.5% (5th)	12.3% (5th)
47	October 28, 2017 (Note: No episodes were aired on October 21 and 22 due to the on-going labor strike at MBC. In return, two episodes were aired back-to-back that day.)	9.6% (4th)	9.6% (4th)	9.6% (4th)	9.6% (5th)
48	October 28, 2017	11.8% (2nd)	11.9% (2nd)	11.8% (2nd)	11.1% (2nd)
49	November 5, 2017 (Note: No episode was aired on November 4 due to a timeslot shift for the series Man in the Kitchen. In return, two episodes were aired back-to-back that day.)	9.2% (8th)	8.5% (7th)	9.9% (6th)	9.5% (7th)
50	November 5, 2017	12.2% (5th)	11.6% (6th)	13.4% (5th)	12.4% (5th)
Average		9.76%	9.78%	10.44%	10.26%

== Awards and nominations ==
Year	Award	Category	Recipient	Result	Ref.
2017	10th Korea Drama Awards	Best New Actress	Seohyun	Nominated	
2017	2017 MBC Drama Awards	Newcomer Award: Best New Actress	Seohyun	Won	
2017	2017 MBC Drama Awards	Top Excellence Actress (Weekend Drama)	Seohyun	Nominated	
2017	2017 MBC Drama Awards	Golden Acting Award, Actor (Weekend Drama)	Ahn Gil-kang	Won	
