= Hong Gildong jeon =

16th or 17th century Korean novel

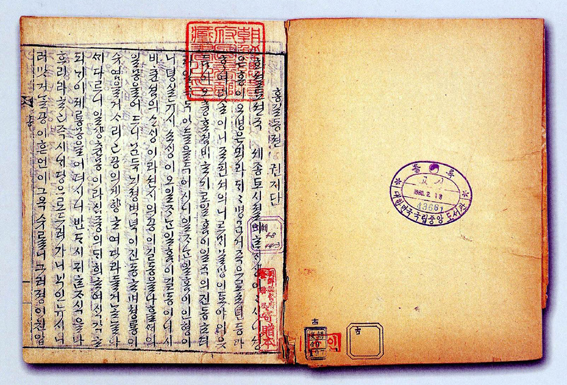
- Opening page of Hong Gildong jeon.

Korean name
- Hangul: 홍길동전
- Hanja: 洪吉童傳
- RR: Hong Gildongjeon
- MR: Hong Kiltongjŏn

Hong Gildong jeon (Korean: 홍길동전; Hanja: 洪吉童傳) is a Korean novel, often translated as The Biography of Hong Gildong, written during the Joseon period. The novel is considered an iconic piece of Korean literature and culture. Its authorship has traditionally been attributed to Joseon statesman, Hŏ Kyun, though recent scholarship has called this into question.

Hong Gildong, an illegitimate son of a nobleman and his lowborn concubine, is the main character of the story. Gifted with supreme intelligence and supernatural abilities, he steals from rich and corrupt aristocrats. Historical sources point to the existence of a bandit named Hong Kiltong who was arrested in 1500, but the historical inspiration for the character was the Korean bandit and folk hero Im Kkeokjeong, who lived in the early 16th century.

"During the 15th year of King Sejong's reign in the nation of Joseon, there was only one prime minister outside of the doors of Hong Hee-mun; his surname was Hong and his given name was Mun..."

This is the first sentence of the novel, introducing the main character's (Hong Gil-dong's) father. It is the beginning of the complete 36-chapter edition of Hong Gildong-jeon. This opening sentence leads off the version most widely used in academia. The original version was written much earlier than this different version (이본/異本).

Hong Gildong jeon can also be referred to as just 'Hong Gil-dong', abbreviating the word jeon (전/傳), meaning 'novel' or 'story' in Hanja.

== Plot ==
Various versions of Hong Gildong jeon exist, each including different details but following the same skeleton and timeline. The story is usually divided into three equal parts, each occurring in different settings.

The first part is set in the Hong Family's residence. After waking from an auspicious dream, the High Minister, Hong Mo, lies with a lowborn maid and conceives Hong Gildong. The story then shifts to Gildong's childhood where he masters his physical, mental, and magical abilities. The first part concludes with Hong Gildong stopping an assassin's attempt on his life and then leaving the Hong residence, unsatisfied with being a second-class son.

In the second part, Hong Gildong becomes the leader of a band of outlaws which he names Hwalbindang ("league of those who help the impoverished"). Gildong and his band steal from locations where wealth is held throughout the country, like storehouses and temples. As his robberies become bolder and more frequent, he draws the attention of the King and ultimately ends up leaving the country in self-imposed exile.

The third part takes place in the country of Yul. Hong Gildong starts over with the Hwalbindang on the island of Jae and then overthrows the King of Yul to become King. He rules as a benevolent king and begins his own family at Yul, in which he treats all of his sons equally.

Many aspects of Hong Gildong-jeon are very similar to that of other heroic novels, featuring noble lineage, low-born birth, extraordinary abilities, crises, and the overcoming and conquering of those crises—also the typical elements of Korean and other East-Asian classic novels. However, it also deals with more complex and deeper themes than the typically simplistic entertainment novels of the Joseon era, which mainly centered around characters trying to achieve success and fame.

== Literary context, themes and history ==
Hong Gildong is often viewed as a reflection of its time. Depending on the Hŏ Kyun authorship model or the one that Kang proposes, this perspective differs. Kang suggests that peace and prosperity in 18th century Korea under the rule of Yeongjo and Jeongjo allowed for increased social mobility and literacy. This led to the development of a market for popular fiction, and Hong Gildong jeon is exemplary of these kinds of novels.

There are more than 34 existing manuscripts of Hong Gildong jeon. Scholars are uncertain which, if any, is the original manuscript, but some evidence suggests that the pilsa 89 manuscript is the oldest surviving version.

== Debates ==
=== Authorship ===
The original author of Hong Gildong remains an open question.

Opinion comes down on one of two sides, with one believing that Hong Gildong was written by a 16th-century Korean scholar and thinker, Hŏ Kyun (1569–1618), and the other believing that it was written by an author whose name is lost.

- Arguments for Hŏ Kyun's authorship

Authorship of the novel is sometimes attributed to Hŏ Kyun, a radical intellectual who long dreamed of changing Korea into a fair society with less strict class hierarchies. The first written attribution to Hŏ Kyun is in the writings of 'Taek-dang' Yi Sik (이식 李植 1584–1647), his former student, in his art collection 'Taek-Dang-jip', or 'The works of Taek-Dang', which he compiled with the help of others. In the 15th kwon, or script, of the separate collection of Teak-Dang-jip, 「산록(散錄)」, it is written that Hŏ Kyun wrote Hong Gildong with an homage to Water Margin. Proponents of this theory, alongside speculating that Hŏ Kyun might have wrote the book during the late 16th or early 17th century with inspiration from the Chinese novel Water Margin, believe that this possibility is likely as Yi Sik, being Hŏ Kyun's pupil, and only being 15 years apart, would have known him firsthand, making him a reliable witness.

Notable advocates of this theory include Sim Chae (심재 沈梓, 1624 - 1693) and Hong Hanju (홍한주 洪翰周, 1798- 1868), Who both wrote in each of their own books 송천필담(松泉筆譚) and 지수점필(智水拈筆) that Hŏ Kyun wrote Hong Gil Dong, Citing Yi-Sik's Taek Dang Jip. Sim Chae was an extremist Southerner, and Hong Hanju was the grandson of the cousin of Hong Guk-yeong, a Sedo (세도) family-man of early Jeongjo's rule, which can serve as proof that Yi Sik's testament was convincing to some contemporary figures, regardless of political parties and background.

Furthermore, Hŏ Kyun is said to be the author because of his radical ideas of political revolution, which are projected in Hong Gildong's journey from secondary son to king.

- Arguments against Hŏ Kyun's authorship

Academics, who argue against Hŏ Kyun's authorship on the other hand, attribute the authorship to another figure or a lost individual.

Professor Lee Yoon-suk argues that even though Hŏ Kyun lived in the late 16th to the early 17th century, Jang Gil-san, a late 17th-century figure, who was a bandit in real life, and Sun-hye-chung, 선혜청(宣惠廳), an 18th-century institution, appears in the novel, making it impossible for him to have written it, alongside the circumstantial evidence of all other pure Hangul novels emerging in the late 18th century. Instead, he argues that the original of Hong Gil Dong Jeon was written by 'Ji so' Hwang il Ho (황일호1588~1641), as Noh hyuk Jeon (노혁전 盧革傳), in Jiso-sunseng-mun-jip (지소선생문집), or the works of the scholar Ji-So. Lee goes to emphasize that In Noh hyuk Jeon, or the story of Noh Hyuk, Hwang Il Ho states early on that "Noh-Hyuk's original surname is Hong, and his given name "Gil-Dong", and (he) truly is from a notable family in our nation...", making sure that the character was Hong Gil-Dong.

In a 2013 article in Azalea: Journal of Korean Literature & Culture, Minsoo Kang argues that the claim for Hŏ Kyun as author of the novel is based on flawed and biased scholarship. He proposes instead that the extant version of the novel was written around the mid-19th century, or not long before that, "by an anonymous writer of secondary or commoner status".

=== Controversy over its status as the first 'Only Hangul' novel ===
Source:

== Cultural legacy ==
In addition to its reputation as a literary work, Hong Gildong jeon has become widely known in Korean culture through various adaptations across different mediums. The story has inspired films, TV shows, comics, literary re-tellings, and video games, and continues to be frequently adapted. Korean rapper G-Dragon makes several references to him in his lyrics. For example, in "Knock Out," he says, "They call me Hong Gildong". There is a Hong Gildong theme park in Jangseong County, traditionally thought to be the character's birthplace, and a Hong Gildong festival is held in Jangseong each year. The 1998 South Korean TV adaptation became particularly resonant amidst growing national anxieties during the 1997 Asian financial crisis.

The character of Hong Gildong has become a mainstay of Korean culture and literature. In Korea today, Hong Gildong is a common placeholder name, similar to John Doe in the United States. Charles Montgomery of the website Korean Literature in Translation explains, "In Korean literature Hong Gildong is legion. He is a fixture from one of the most important early novels in Hangul – he is the first truly 'Korean' main character". Professor Minsoo Kang writes in the foreword to his translation, "The Story of Hong Gildong is arguably the single most important work of classic (i.e., premodern) prose fiction of Korea, in terms of not only its literary achievement but also of its influence on the larger culture". NPR's Ari Shapiro explained on Fresh Air, "Sometimes, a single character can help define a country's sense of self. Here in the U.S., you might think of Jay Gatsby in The Great Gatsby or Superman. In North and South Korea, it's Hong Gildong".

The similarities of the plot of Hong-Gildong being a folk bandit has drawn him comparisons to famous bandits like the English folk hero Robin Hood and Australia's Ned Kelly.

== Adaptations ==
- Shin Dong-wu created the South Korean Hong Gildong comic books in the 1960s, creating the iconic image of the hero in a blue shirt, headscarf and straw gat.
- The story was adapted into a South Korean animated feature film of the same name in 1967.
- A South Korean animated feature film sequel named Hong Gil-dong Janggun (홍길동 장군, "General Hong Gildong") followed in 1969.
- The South Korean 1983 animated feature film Uju Jeonsa Hong Gil-dong (우주전사 홍길동, "Space Soldier Hong Gil dong") takes the character into a science fiction setting.
- A North Korean martial arts film, Hong Kil Dong, was released in 1986, in which he fights against Japanese ninjas.
- A South Korean action video game adaption, Hong Kil Dong, was released for Master System and MSX computers in 1990 by Clover.
- A South Korean role-playing video game, Hong Gil-dong jeon (홍길동전), was released for IBM compatible computers in 1993 by A+.
- A sequel to the 1993 game, the interactive movie Hong Gil-dong jeon 2 (홍길동전 2), was released in 1995.
- Another South Korean animated feature film was released in 1995 with the title Doraon Yeongung Hong Gil-dong (돌아온 영웅 홍길동, "Returned Hero Hong Gildong").
- A platform game video game adaption of the 1995 animated feature film with the same title was released in December 1995 by LG for Windows.
- The 1995 South Korean role-playing video game The Romance of Forgotten Kingdom (망국전기~잊혀진 나라의 이야기, Mangguk Jeon'gi: Ichyeojin Nara-ui Iyagi) takes place in Yuldo, the country founded by Hong Gildong in the original story.
- The 1998 South Korean TV series Hong Gil-Dong on Seoul Broadcasting System, which received viewership ratings of over 30% at the height of its popularity and starring Kim Suk-hoon in one of his first feature roles.
- The manhwa series Hong Gil-dong: Murim jeonsa rok (홍길동~무림전사록) by Oh Se-kwon (오세권) was started in 2004 and tells the story of Hong Gildong's return to Joseon in a fantasy world with cyberpunk elements.
- A character from Hong Gildong was also adapted in the Shin Agyo Onshi manga as female bandit leader.
- A South Korean TV series entitled Hong Gil-Dong, The Hero (a.k.a. Hong Gil-dong), first aired on January 2, 2008, on KBS2.
- A modern-day film adaptation named Descendants of Hong Gil-Dong was made in 2009.
- In the 2010 musical Hong Gil-dong, Sungmin and Yesung of Super Junior played the historical figure. It played at the Woori Financial Art Hall at the Olympic Park from 18 February 18 April 2010.
- In the Seoul Broadcasting System TV series Running Man, Haha played 'Ha Gil-dong' (an adaptation of Hong Gil-dong) in a special superheroes episode, broadcast on 12 October 2014.
- A comic action thriller, Phantom Detective, depicts a modern-day Hong Gil-dong as a detective.
- 2017 television series The Rebel starring Yoon Kyun-sang as Hong Gildong.
- In Overwatch, an alternate costume for the character Tracer is themed after Hong Gil-dong. This was produced for the 2019 Lunar New Year Event.
- Korean gacha video game Sid Story has female version of Hong Gil Dong in the game.
- Television series To My Beloved Thief starring Nam Ji-hyun as Hong Gildong first aired on January 3, 2026 on KBS2.

=== Actors who played Hong Gil-dong ===
- Portrayed by Kim Suk-hoon in the 1998 SBS TV series.
- Portrayed by Kang Ji-hwan and Lee In-sung in the 2008 KBS2 TV series Hong Gil-dong.
- Portrayed by Sungmin and Yesung in the 2010 musical Hong Gil-dong.
- Portrayed by Yoon Kyun-sang in the 2017 MBC TV series The Rebel.
- Portrayed by Nam Ji Hyun in the 2025 KBS2 TV series To My Beloved Thief.

== English-language translations ==
- The Story of Hong Gildong, translated by Minsoo Kang. New York: Penguin, 2016. Based on the pilsa 89 manuscript.
- The Legend of Hong Kil Dong: Outlaw Hero of Korea, Anne Sibley O'Brien, Charlesbridge, 2008. Illustrated graphic novel.
- The Story of Hong Gil Dong. Seoul: The Korean Classical Literature Institute (Baek AM Publishing Company), 2000. Bilingual edition based on the gyeongpan 30 manuscript.
- "The Tale of Hong Kiltong". Translated by Marshall R. Pihl. In Anthology of Korean Literature: From Early Times to the Nineteenth Century, compiled and edited by Peter H. Lee. Honolulu: The University Press of Hawaii, 1981 (pp. 119–147). Based on the gyeongpan 24 manuscript.
- "Hong Kil Tong, The Adventures of an Abused Boy," translated by Horace Newton Allen. In Korean Tales: Being a Collection of Stories Translated from the Korean Folk Lore. New York: G.P. Putnam's Sons, 1889. 170–93. Loosely translated, verging on a retelling.
