= 2017 MBC Drama Awards =

36th edition of award ceremony

- Date: December 30, 2017
- Site: MBC Media Center Public Hall, Sangam-dong, Mapo-gu, Seoul
- Hosted by: Main: Kim Sung-ryung; Oh Sang-jin; Special MC: Cha Eunwoo; Lee Soo-min

Highlights
- Best Drama Serial: The Rebel
- Grand Prize (Daesang): Kim Sang-joong

Television coverage
- Network: MBC
- Duration: 230 minutes

The 2017 MBC Drama Awards, presented by Munhwa Broadcasting Corporation (MBC) took place on December 30, 2017. It was hosted by Kim Sung-ryung and Oh Sang-jin.

== Winners and nominees ==
- This year, the Grand Prize (Daesang) has been determined by judges including PDs from MBC. The "Drama of the Year" award was chosen by viewers.
- Winners denoted in **bold**

Grand Prize (Daesang)	Drama of the Year
**Kim Sang-joong** – **The Rebel**; Choi Min-soo – Man Who Dies to Live; Ha Ji-won – Hospital Ship; Huh Joon-ho – The Emperor: Owner of the Mask; Jang Hyuk – Money Flower; Jo Jung-suk – Two Cops; Uhm Jung-hwa – You Are Too Much; Yoo Seung-ho – The Emperor: Owner of the Mask	**The Rebel**; The Emperor: Owner of the Mask; Man Who Dies to Live; Missing 9; Money Flower; Radiant Office; Two Cops
Top Excellence Award, Actor in a Weekend Drama	Top Excellence Award, Actress in a Weekend Drama
**Jang Hyuk** – **Money Flower**; Kim Kap-soo – Man in the Kitchen; Kim Jaewon – Father, I'll Take Care of You; Kim Ji-hoon – Bad Thief, Good Thief; Ji Hyun-woo – Bad Thief, Good Thief; Jun Kwang-ryul – You Are Too Much	**Lee Mi-sook** – **Money Flower**; Choi Soo-young – Man in the Kitchen; Kim Mi-sook – Man in the Kitchen; Seohyun – Bad Thief, Good Thief; Uhm Jung-hwa – You Are Too Much
Top Excellence Award, Actor in a Miniseries	Top Excellence Award, Actress in a Miniseries
**Yoo Seung-ho** – **The Emperor: Owner of the Mask**; Choi Min-soo – Man Who Dies to Live; Ha Seok-jin – Radiant Office; Huh Joon-ho – The Emperor: Owner of the Mask; Um Ki-joon – I'm Not a Robot	**Ha Ji-won** – **Hospital Ship**; Baek Jin-hee – Missing 9; Go Ah-sung – Radiant Office; Kang Ye-won – Man Who Dies to Live; Kim So-hyun – The Emperor: Owner of the Mask
Top Excellence Award, Actor in a Soap Opera	Top Excellence Award, Actress in a Soap Opera
**Go Se-won** – **Return of Fortunate Bok**; Ahn Jae-mo – Enemies from the Past; Kwon Hyun-sang – Always Spring; Sunwoo Jae-duk – Always Spring	**Kim Mi-kyung** – **Person Who Gives Happiness**; Kang Sung-yeon – Return of Fortunate Bok; Lee Yoon-ji – Person Who Gives Happiness; Park Si-eun – Teacher Oh Soon-nam
Top Excellence Award, Actor in a Monday-Tuesday Drama	Top Excellence Award, Actress in a Monday-Tuesday Drama
**Jo Jung-suk** – **Two Cops**; **Kim Ji-seok** – **Children of the 20th Century**; Im Si-wan – The King in Love; Kim Sang-joong – The Rebel; Kim Young-kwang – The Guardians; Yoon Kyun-sang – The Rebel	**Lee Ha-nui** – **The Rebel**; Han Ye-seul – Children of the 20th Century; Im Yoon-ah – The King in Love; Lee Hye-ri – Two Cops; Lee Si-young – The Guardians
Excellence Award, Actor in a Weekend Drama	Excellence Award, Actress in a Weekend Drama
**Jang Seung-jo** – **Money Flower**; Choi Jong-hwan – Bad Thief, Good Thief; Kang Tae-oh – You Are Too Much; On Joo-wan – Man in the Kitchen	**Jang Hee-jin** – **You Are Too Much**; Lim Ju-eun – Bad Thief, Good Thief; Park Eun-bin – Father, I'll Take Care of You; Seo Hyo-rim – Man in the Kitchen; Shin Eun-jung – Bad Thief, Good Thief
Excellence Award, Actor in a Miniseries	Excellence Award, Actress in a Miniseries
**Shin Sung-rok** – **Man Who Dies to Live**; Choi Tae-joon – Missing 9; Kang Min-hyuk – Hospital Ship; Kim Dong-wook – Radiant Office; Kim Myung-soo – The Emperor: Owner of the Mask; Lee Dong-hwi – Radiant Office	**Han Sun-hwa** – **Radiant Office**; Jung Kyung-soon – Hospital Ship; Lee So-yeon – Man Who Dies to Live; Wang Ji-won – Hospital Ship; Yoon So-hee – The Emperor: Owner of the Mask
Excellence Award, Actor in a Soap Opera	Excellence Award, Actress in a Soap Opera
**Kang Kyung-joon** – **Sisters-in-Law**; Cha Do-jin – Sisters-in-Law; Kim Ji-han – Golden Pouch; Lee Ha-yool – Person Who Gives Happiness	**Song Seon-mi** – **Return of Fortunate Bok**; Hahm Eun-jung – Sisters-in-Law; Kang Byul – Always Spring; Lee Joo-yeon – Sisters-in-Law; Shin Da-eun – Backflow
Excellence Award, Actor in a Monday-Tuesday Drama	Excellence Award, Actress in a Monday-Tuesday Drama
**Kim Seon-ho** – **Two Cops**; Hong Jong-hyun – The King in Love; Lee Sang-woo – Children of the 20th Century; Oh Min-suk – The King in Love	**Chae Soo-bin** – **The Rebel**; Im Se-mi – Two Cops; Jang Young-nam – The King in Love; Kim Seul-gi – The Guardians
Golden Acting Award, Actor in a Weekend Drama	Golden Acting Award, Actress in a Weekend Drama
**Ahn Gil-kang** – **Bad Thief, Good Thief**; Hwang Dong-joo – Father, I'll Take Care of You; Kim Chang-wan – Father, I'll Take Care of You; Lee Seung-joon – Father, I'll Take Care of You	**Shin Dong-mi** – **Father, I'll Take Care of You**; Jung Hye-sun – You Are Too Much; Kim Bo-yeon – You Are Too Much; Kim Soo-mi – Man in the Kitchen; Lee Jung-eun – Bad Thief, Good Thief; Yoon A-jung – You Are Too Much
Golden Acting Award, Actor in a Miniseries	Golden Acting Award, Actress in a Miniseries
**Oh Jung-se** – **Missing 9**; Kim Kwang-kyu – Hospital Ship; Kwon Hae-hyo – Radiant Office; Park Chul-min – The Emperor: Owner of the Mask	**Jang Shin-young** – **Radiant Office**; **Kim Seon-kyung** – **The Emperor: Owner of the Mask**; Hwang Seung-eon – Man Who Dies to Live; Park Joon-geum – Hospital Ship
Golden Acting Award, Actor in a Soap Opera	Golden Acting Award, Actress in a Soap Opera
**Ahn Nae-sang** – **Golden Pouch**; Kim Byung-choon – Sisters-in-Law; Lee Jung-gil – Return of Fortunate Bok	**Song Ok-sook** – **Person Who Gives Happiness**; Geum Bo-ra – Teacher Oh Soon-nam; Kim Cheong – Sisters-in-Law; Lee Hye-sook – Return of Fortunate Bok
Golden Acting Award, Actor in a Monday-Tuesday Drama	Golden Acting Award, Actress in a Monday-Tuesday Drama
**Jeong Bo-seok** – **The King in Love**; Ahn Se-ha – Children of the 20th Century; Kim Byeong-ok – The Rebel; Lee Si-eon – Two Cops; Shin Dong-wook – The Guardians	**Seo Yi-sook** – **The Rebel**; Kim Sun-young – The Guardians; Moon Ji-in – Two Cops; Ryu Hyun-kyung – Children of the 20th Century
Popularity Award, Actor	Popularity Award, Actress
**Kim Myung-soo** – **The Emperor: Owner of the Mask**; Jang Hyuk – Money Flower; Jo Jung-suk – Two Cops; Kang Min-hyuk – Hospital Ship; Kim Ji-seok – Children of the 20th Century; Yoo Seung-ho – I'm Not a Robot; Yoon Kyun-sang – The Rebel	**Kim So-hyun** – **The Emperor: Owner of the Mask**; Chae Soo-bin – I'm Not a Robot; Ha Ji-won – Hospital Ship; Han Ye-seul – Children of the 20th Century; Im Yoon-ah – The King in Love; Lee Ha-nui – The Rebel; Lee Hye-ri – Two Cops
Best New Actor	Best New Actress
**Kim Jung-hyun** – **The Rebel**; **Kim Seon-ho** – **Two Cops**; Kim Ki-bum – The Guardians; Kim Myung-soo – The Emperor: Owner of the Mask; Jo Sung-hyun – You Are Too Much; Lee Ho-won – Radiant Office; Lee Seo-won – Hospital Ship; Shim Hee-seop – The Rebel	**Lee Sun-bin** – **Missing 9**; **Seohyun** – **Bad Thief, Good Thief**; Hahm Eun-jung – Sisters-in-Law; Han So-hee – Money Flower; Kwon Mina – Hospital Ship; Lee Joo-yeon – Sisters-in-Law; Lee Sang-hee – Children of the 20th Century; Lee Soo-min – The Rebel; Ryu Hyo-young – Golden Pouch
Best Young Actor/Actress	Best Character Award, Best Villain
**Lee Ro-woon** – **The Rebel**; **Nam Da-reum** – **The King in Love**; Jo Yeon-ho – Person Who Gives Happiness; Jung Soo-in – The Rebel; Lee Chae-mi – Teacher Oh Soon-nam; Lomon – The Guardians; Son Bo-seung – Father, I'll Take Care of You; Yoon Chan-young – The King in Love	**Choi Tae-joon** – **Missing 9**; Geum Bo-ra – Blow Breeze; Han Soo-yeon – Teacher Oh Soon-nam; Huh Joon-ho – The Emperor: Owner of the Mask; Seo Yi-sook – Bad Thief, Good Thief
Best Character Award, Fighting Spirit Acting	Best Character Award, Comic Character
**Kim Myung-soo** – **The Emperor: Owner of the Mask**; Kim Sang-joong – The Rebel; Lee Joo-woo – Return of Fortunate Bok; Lee Si-young – The Guardians; Ryu Won – Missing 9	**Jung Kyung-ho** – **Missing 9**; Hwang Dong-joo – Father, I'll Take Care of You; Kim Seon-ho – Two Cops; Kim Soo-mi – Man in the Kitchen; Shin Sung-rok – Man Who Dies to Live
Writer of the Year
**Hwang Jin-young** – **The Rebel**

== Presenters ==
Actor Kim Sang-joong gave a memorial speech for late Kim Ji-young (1938–2017), late Kim Young-ae (1951–2017), late Lee Mi-ji (1960–2017) and late Kim Joo-hyuk (1972–2017).

Order	Presenter	Award	Ref.
1	Ryu Jun-yeol, Nam Ji-hyun	Best New Actor/Actress	
2	Jung Da-bin, Goo Geon-min	Best Young Actor/Actress	
3	Park Jun-gyu, Seo Yi-sook	Writer of the Year	
4	Yoo Seung-ho, Chae Soo-bin	Best Character Award	
5	Shin Sung-rok, Lee Hwi-hyang	Golden Acting Award in a Weekend Drama/Miniseries	
6	Lee Pil-mo, Kim Ji-ho	Golden Acting Award in a Soap Opera/Monday-Tuesday Drama	
7	Jo Jung-suk, Lee Hye-ri	Popularity Award	
8	Son Ho-jun, Lim Ji-yeon	Excellence Award in a Weekend Drama/Miniseries	
9	Kim Eui-sung, Lee Ha-nui	Excellence Award in a Soap Opera/Monday-Tuesday Drama	
10	Ahn Nae-sang, Uee	Top Excellence Award in a Weekend Drama/Miniseries	
11	Lee Sang-woo, Kim So-yeon	Top Excellence Award in a Soap Opera/Monday-Tuesday Drama	
12	Lee Soon-jae	Drama of the Year	
13	Choi Gyo-sik, Lee Jong-suk	Grand Prize (Daesang)	

== Special performances ==
Order	Artist	Song	Ref.
1	Mamamoo	Yes I Am (나로 말할 것 같으면)	
2	ASTRO	OST Medley: Don't Ask (묻지 말기로 해) (Two Cops OST); Too Young To Die (죽어도 좋아) (Man Who Dies to Live OST); Let Me Cry (You Are Too Much OST); From The First Time You and Me (처음부터 너와 나) (The Emperor: Owner of the Mask OST)	
2	ASTRO	Crazy Sexy Cool (니가 불어와)	

== See also ==
- 2017 KBS Drama Awards
- 2017 SBS Drama Awards
