= Clean with Passion for Now =

South Korean television series

- Promotional poster
- Hangul: 일단 뜨겁게 청소하라!!
- RR: Ildan tteugeopge cheongsohara!!
- MR: Iltan ttŭgŏpke ch'ŏngsohara!!
- Genre: Romantic comedy
- Based on: Clean with Passion for Now by Aengo (앵고)
- Written by: Han Hee-jung
- Directed by: No Jong-chan
- Starring: Yoon Kyun-sang; Kim Yoo-jung; Song Jae-rim
- Country of origin: South Korea
- Original language: Korean
- No. of episodes: 16

Production
- Executive producers: Kim Joo-seok; Park Joon-seo
- Running time: 70 minutes
- Production companies: Drama House; Oh! Brothers Production

Original release
- Network: JTBC
- Release: November 26, 2018 – February 4, 2019

Clean with Passion for Now (Korean: 일단 뜨겁게 청소하라!!) is a 2018 South Korean television series starring Yoon Kyun-sang, Kim Yoo-jung, and Song Jae-rim. It is based on the popular webtoon of the same title by Aengo, which was first published by KakaoPage in 2013, and was later published by Comico Korea in 2015. It aired on JTBC from November 26, 2018 to February 4, 2019, every Monday and Tuesday at 21:30 (KST).

== Synopsis ==
Jang Seon-kyul (Yoon Kyun-sang), a wealthy man who suffers from severe mysophobia, is obsessed with cleaning and even owns his own cleaning company. One day, he meets a carefree and untidy girl named Gil Oh-sol (Kim Yoo-jung) after she enters his company as a new employee. Oh-sol has worked all sorts of part-time jobs while striving for a full-time one and does not have the luxury to date or clean. She gave up on being neat after facing the tough reality of the world and is known for always wearing her trademark tracksuit. With the help of Oh-sol, Seon-kyul overcomes mysophobia and falls in love with her.

== Cast ==
=== Main ===
- Yoon Kyun-sang as Jang Seon-kyul, a good-looking and wealthy CEO of "Cleaning Fairy" who suffered mysophobia.
- Kim Yoo-jung as Gil Oh-sol, a girl with a positive personality. She does not really care about dirtiness and possesses a strong stomach.
- Song Jae-rim as Choi Ha-in/Daniel Choi, a psychiatrist from the Rochester Clinic who lives on the rooftop of Oh-sol's house and is known for being a free spirit.

=== Supporting ===
==== People around Oh-sol ====
- Kim Won-hae as Gil Gong-tae, Oh-sol's father. A district cleaner.
- Lee Do-hyun as Gil Oh-dol, Oh-sol's younger brother who is a promising Taekwondo athlete.
- Min Do-hee as Min Joo-yeon, Oh-sol's best friend.

==== People around Seon-kyul ====
- Kim Hye-eun as Cha Mae-hwa, Seon-kyul's mother.
- Ahn Suk-hwan as Cha Seung-hwan, Seon-kyul's grandfather who serves as president of AG Group.
- Yoo Sun as Secretary Kwon, Seon-kyul's secretary.
- Kim Ki-nam as Secretary Kim

==== Cleaning Fairies ====
- Yang Hak-jin as Kim Dong-hyun, a rebellious guy who is good at fighting.
- Cha In-ha as Hwang Jae-min, a dreamer who was chased out of his home.
- Go Geon-han as Jeon Young-shik, Oh-dol's senior at the Taekwondo training center.

==== Others ====
- Son Byong-ho as President Yang, Mae-hwa's lover.
- Lee Jin-kwon as President Yang's assistant.
- Choi Yoo-song as Bodhisattva Wang, Ha-in's patient who is a fortune teller.
- Ham Sung-min as an action figure collector

== Production ==
The first script-reading occurred on January 30, 2018, at JTBC building in Sangam-dong.

The series was set to air in April 2018. However, on February 26, it was revealed that lead actress Kim Yoo-jung was diagnosed with hypothyroidism, and would be focusing on treatment. It has since halted filming, with its broadcast having been delayed to the second half of that year.

On May 25, JTBC announced that the production would resume filming in August 2018 for a slated premiere in November. Ahn Hyo-seop, who was originally cast in the lead role of Jang Seon-kyul, withdrew from the drama due to scheduling conflicts. He was replaced by Yoon Kyun-sang.

Filming resumed on September 5.

== Original soundtrack ==
Clean with Passion for Now OST

Soundtrack album by Various artists
- Released: 2018
- Genre: Soundtrack
- Languages: Korean; English
- Labels: Warner Music, JTBC Contents Hub

=== Part 1 ===
Released on November 26, 2018
No.	Title	Lyrics	Music	Artist	Length
1.	"Sweet Heart"	Love City	Love City	Oh My Girl Banhana	03:42
2.	"Sweet Heart" (Inst.)		Love City		03:42
Total length:					07:24

=== Part 2 ===
Released on November 26, 2018
No.	Title	Lyrics	Music	Artist	Length
1.	"Oh Lady Go Lady"	HoeJangNim, Lee Kwang-hee	HoeJangNim, Lee Kwang-hee, Yoo Young-joon	GWSN	03:38
2.	"Oh Lady Go Lady" (Inst.)		HoeJangNim, Lee Kwang-hee, Yoo Young-joon		03:38
Total length:					07:16

=== Part 3 ===
Released on December 10, 2018
No.	Title	Lyrics	Music	Artist	Length
1.	"I Luv U Luv"	GamDongis, ROZ	GamDongis, ROZ	Yoo Seung-woo	03:12
2.	"I Luv U Luv" (Inst.)		GamDongis, ROZ		03:12
Total length:					06:24

=== Part 4 ===
Released on December 17, 2018
No.	Title	Lyrics	Music	Artist	Length
1.	"I Want To Sleep More" (좀 더 잘래요)	HoeJangNim, Ra.L, Lee Kwang-hee	HoeJangNim, Ra.L, Lee Kwang-hee	Kim Greem	03:57
2.	"I Want To Sleep More" (Inst.)		HoeJangNim, Ra.L, Lee Kwang-hee		03:57
Total length:					07:54

=== Part 5 ===
Released on December 24, 2018
No.	Title	Lyrics	Music	Artist	Length
1.	"Gravity"	HoeJangNim, Lee Kwang-hee, Ra.L	HoeJangNim, Lee Kwang-hee, Yoo Young-joon	Klang	04:41
2.	"Gravity (English Ver.)"	HoeJangNim, Hodge, Lee Kwang-hee	HoeJangNim, Lee Kwang-hee, Yoo Young-joon	Klang	04:41
3.	"Gravity" (Inst.)		HoeJangNim, Lee Kwang-hee, Yoo Young-joon		04:41
4.	"Gravity (English Ver.)" (Inst.)		HoeJangNim, Lee Kwang-hee, Yoo Young-joon		04:41
Total length:					18:44

=== Part 6 ===
Released on December 31, 2018
No.	Title	Lyrics	Music	Artist	Length
1.	"Clean with Passion for Now" (일단 뜨겁게 청소하라)	KwonMilk	KwonMilk	Crying Nut	03:01
2.	"Clean with Passion for Now" (Inst.)		KwonMilk		03:01
Total length:					06:02

=== Part 7 ===
Released on January 7, 2019
No.	Title	Lyrics	Music	Artist	Length
1.	"Fade Into You" (물 들어가)	Gamdongis, Seo Jae-ha, Kim Young-sung	Gamdongis, Seo Jae-ha, Kim Young-sung	Nam Sae-ra	03:55
2.	"Fade Into You" (Inst.)		Gamdongis, Seo Jae-ha, Kim Young-sung		03:55
Total length:					07:50

=== Part 8 ===
Released on January 14, 2019
No.	Title	Lyrics	Music	Artist	Length
1.	"Cosmos"	Love City	Love City	Huh Gak	04:11
2.	"Cosmos" (Inst.)		LoveCity		04:11
Total length:					08:22

=== Part 9 ===
Released on January 21, 2019
No.	Title	Lyrics	Music	Artist	Length
1.	"I Can't Say You're The Only One" (너 뿐이라고 말하진 못해도)	HoeJangNim, Lee Kwang-hee	HoeJangNim, Lee Kwang-hee, Hodge	Kevin Oh	04:10
2.	"I Can't Say You're The Only One" (Inst.)		HoeJangNim, Lee Kwang-hee, Hodge		04:10
Total length:					08:20

=== Part 10 ===
Released on January 28, 2019
No.	Title	Lyrics	Music	Artist	Length
1.	"You Are Everything To Me"	Yoon Kyung, Lee Kyu-won	Lee Kyu-won	Joohee	04:06
2.	"You Are Everything To Me" (Inst.)		Lee Kyu-won		04:06
Total length:					08:12

== Viewership ==
Clean with Passion for Now : South Korea viewers per episode (millions)

Season	Episode number															
Season	1	2	3	4	5	6	7	8	9	10	11	12	13	14	15	16
1	748	843	778	754	787	718	825	901	669	852	N/A	N/A	N/A	N/A	N/A	N/A

Source: Audience measurement performed nationwide by Nielsen Korea.

Average TV viewership ratings
Ep.	Original broadcast date	Title	Average audience share (Nielsen Korea)	
Ep.	Original broadcast date	Title	Nationwide	Seoul
1	November 26, 2018	That Man and Woman's Stories (그 남자, 그 여자의 사정)	3.272%	3.605%
2	November 27, 2018	Coincidence Offers Aid To Those Who Don't Want It (우연은 원치 않은 자에게 조력을 베푼다)	3.320%	3.201%
3	December 3, 2018	It Starts With a Kiss (시작은 키스!)	3.483%	3.374%
4	December 4, 2018	Bit by Bit, Just Like That (조금씩, 조금씩, 그렇게)	3.394%	2.986%
5	December 10, 2018	Sweet and Tangy Yogurt (새콤달콤 요구르트)	3.533%	3.708%
6	December 11, 2018	Because We Don't Know Ourselves (왜냐하면 우리는 우리를 모르고)	2.997%	2.841%
7	December 17, 2018	While We Touch Each Other (서로에게 닿는 동안)	3.435%	3.366%
8	December 18, 2018	Things I Like and Things I Like (좋아하는 것과 좋아하는 것)	3.574%	3.516%
9	December 24, 2018	Saying "I Like You" Isn't Always Necessary (꼭 좋아한다 말하지 않아도)	2.777%	2.864%
10	December 25, 2018	Secrets and Lies (비밀과 거짓말)	3.304%	3.565%
11	January 14, 2019	I Can't Hide It (숨길 수 없어요)	2.131%	N/A
12	January 15, 2019	It Can't Get Better Than This (이보다 더 좋을 순 없다)	2.084%	N/A
13	January 21, 2019	I Will Be Your Shoulder to Lean On (내가 너의 어깨가 되어줄게)	2.139%	N/A
14	January 28, 2019	You Make Me Want to Be a Better Man (당신은 내가 더 좋은 사람이 되고 싶게 만들어요)	2.027%	N/A
15	January 29, 2019	When I Madly Want to Hug You (네가 미치도록 안고 싶을 때)	1.906%	N/A
16	February 4, 2019	Love With Passion For Now! (일단 뜨겁게 사랑하라!!)	1.583%	N/A
Average			2.810%	— (Note: Due to some unpublished ratings, the exact average rating is unknown.)
In the table above, the blue numbers represent the lowest ratings and the red numbers represent the highest ratings.; N/A denotes ratings that were not released.; This series aired on a cable channel/pay TV which normally has a relatively smaller audience compared to free-to-air TV/public broadcasters (KBS, SBS, MBC, and EBS).; Episodes 11 and 12 did not air on January 7 and 8, 2019, respectively. They were postponed to the following week and a soccer match between South Korea and the Philippines was broadcast during the series' time slot on January 7.

== Remake ==
In 2018, iQiyi announced a Chinese adaptation of the drama titled Cleaning Elfs. It was released on Netflix under the title Use For My Talent in 2021.
