= Lee Soo-min =

South Korean actress (born 2001)

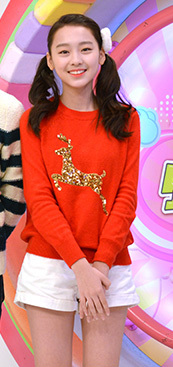
- Lee in 2014
- Born: July 1, 2001 (age 25); Ulsan, South Korea
- Occupation: Actress
- Years active: 2009–present
- Agent(s): J&K Entertainment (2014–2019, 2025–present); Artist Company (2019–2023); Ikkle Entertainment (2023–2025)

Korean name
- Hangul: 이수민
- RR: I Sumin
- MR: I Sumin

Lee Soo-min (Korean: 이수민; born July 1, 2001) is a South Korean actress. In 2014, she became a co-host of Tok! Tok! Boni, Hani.

== Filmography ==
=== Film ===
Year	Title	Role	Ref.
2019	The Dude In Me	Oh Hyun-jung	
2022	Urban Myths	Hye-yeon	

=== Television series ===
Year	Title	Role	Notes	Ref.
2014	My Lovely Girl	young Yoon So-Eun		
2016	Second to Last Love	Go Ye-ji		
2017	The Rebel	Hong Uh-ri-ni/Sang-hwa		
2018	Cross	Kim Eun-ji	Cameo	
2019	Abyss	Go Se-yeon / young Go Se-yoon	Cameo	
2021	The King's Affection	Bang Young-ji		
2023	Twinkling Watermelon	Yoon Sang-ah		
2025	Would You Marry Me?	Jenny	special appearance (Episodes 1-2, 4-5)	

=== Web series ===
Year	Title	Role	Notes	Ref.
2017	Devil Inspector	Jung Seul-gi		
2021	Work Later, Drink Now	So-hyeon	Cameo	
2022	Two Universes	Kim Byul		
2022	Revenge of Others	Kuk Ji-hyeon		
2025	Heo's Diner	Maechang / Jung Mi-sol		

=== Television shows ===
Year	Title	Role	Notes	Ref.
2014	Tok! Tok! Boni Hani	MC	with Shin Dong-woo	
2016	Show! Music Core	MC	with Kim Sae-ron & Cha Eun-woo	
2018	King of Mask Singer	Contestant	Money Girl (Episode 141)	

== Awards and nominations ==
Name of the award ceremony, year presented, category, nominee of the award, and the result of the nomination
Award ceremony	Year	Category	Nominee / Work	Result	Ref.
MBC Drama Awards	2017	Best New Actress	The Rebel	Nominated	
Seoul Webfest Film Festival	2022	Best Actress	Two different Woojoo	Won	
