= Hospital Ship (TV series) =

South Korean television series

- Promotional poster
- Hangul: 병원선
- RR: Byeongwonseon
- MR: Pyŏngwŏnsŏn
- Genre: Medical; Romance
- Created by: Han Hee (MBC)
- Written by: Yoon Sun-joo
- Directed by: Park Jae-bum
- Starring: Ha Ji-won; Kang Min-hyuk; Lee Seo-won
- Country of origin: South Korea
- Original language: Korean
- No. of episodes: 40

Production
- Executive producers: Kim Hee-yeol; Jun San
- Producers: Kim Sang-woo; Yoo Hyun-jong
- Production locations: Geojedo, South Korea
- Running time: 35 min
- Production company: Pan Entertainment

Original release
- Network: MBC TV
- Release: August 30 – November 2, 2017

Hospital Ship (Korean: 병원선; RR: Byeongwonseon) is a South Korean television series starring Ha Ji-won and Kang Min-hyuk. The series is directed by Park Jae-bum and written by screenwriter Yoon Sun-joo. It aired on MBC every Wednesday and Thursday at 22:00 (KST) and started on August 30, 2017.

== Plot ==
The story is about a group of young doctors who provide medical care to the locals who live in rural villages via a hospital ship that sails around the little islands.

Song Eun Jae is an immensely talented surgeon. There was a time when the hospital ship was just used for standard checkups and administering medicine. With Song Eun Jae on board, it can provide complicated surgery. She has seen a lot of success as a surgeon, but also a lot of struggles in her family life. When an unfortunate incident leads her to a ship instead of a prestigious hospital, she has little compassion for the stubborn elderly patients.

Kwak Hyun is the emotional opposite of his senior doctor, Song Eun Jae. Growing up with a father who is a lauded humanitarian, Kwak Hyun strives to be a warm and caring person. He heals not just with medicine but a smile. It seems natural that he works at his father's ship, but Kwak Hyun also has some emotional scars. He cannot match Song Eun Jae's medical skills, but he is infinitely better at connecting with patients.

Kim Jae Geol has Hallyu looks and an extensive lineage in medicine. His father is a respected doctor. Growing up, his dad always preferred his brilliant brother, which led Jae Geol to become a loner at heart. His father was obsessed with western medicine. As a form of rebellion, Kim Jae Gol studied oriental medicine, much to his father's disapproval. His goal in boarding the ship was to escape his father's shadow. At the ship, however, he must work under Song Eun Jae, who is just as strict, emotionless and disdainful of oriental medicine.

Now, these three doctors have to put aside their polar opposite personalities in order to treat their patients. As they all soon learn, working for your fellow humans has its own way of bringing people together.

== Cast ==
=== Main ===
- Ha Ji-won as Song Eun-jae

She is a capable surgeon and future chief at a large hospital located in Seoul who later joins the crew on the hospital ship due to her mother passing away

- Kang Min-hyuk as Kwak Hyun

Son of a famous well known surgeon. He becomes a doctor because of his father and later volunteers to join the hospital ship as his military service.

- Lee Seo-won as Kim Jae-geol
  - Choi Seung-hoon as young Jae-gol

A chaebol oriental doctor whose father is a director of a general hospital. He was placed on the hospital ship and is good friends with Joon-young.

- Kim In-sik as Cha Joon-young

A dentist who was placed on the hospital ship. He and Jae-geol are good friends.

=== Supporting ===
==== Hospital people ====
- Kwon Mina as Yoo Ah-rim
- Kim Kwang-kyu as Choo Won-gong
- Jeong Gyeong-sun as Pyo Go-eun

==== Hospital ship people ====
- Lee Han-wi as Bang Sung-woo
- Jang Seo-won as Yang Choon-ho
- Song Ji-ho as Kang Jung-ho

==== Family members ====
- Cha Hwa-yeon as Oh Hye-jung, Eun-Jae's mother (Ep. 1-3)
- Kim Sun-young as Oh Mi-jung, Eun-jae's aunt
- Jo Sung-ha as Song Jae-joon
- Jung In-gi as Kwak Sung
- Nam Gi-ae as Lee Soo-kyung, Kwak Hyun's mother
- Jung Won-joong as Kim Soo-kwon
- Park Joon-geum as Han Hee-sook
- Lee Tae-ri (Note: Credited as Lee Min-ho.) as Song Woo-jae, a 28-year-old student and Eun-jae's younger brother

=== Others ===
- Wang Ji-won as Choi Young-eun
- Jeon No-min as Kim Do-hoon
- Kang Da-hyun as Kwak Ji-eun
- Park Tae-sung as Kang Yong-soo
- Lee Da-hae
- Jo A-ra as Yang Ji-young
- Ji Chan
- Park Seung-chan
- Lee Chung-hee
- Seo Dan-won
- Min Dae-sik
- Jang Mun-gyu as Ki Kwan-sa
- Sung Hyun-mi
- Ryu Sung-ryul
- Kim Mi-hye
- Shin Shin-beom
- Lee Chae-kyung
- Song In-seob
- Woo Sang-jun as Woojin's grandfather
- Joo Boo-jin as Hospital patient
- Heo Jung-gyu
- Lim Chae-yeon
- Lee Dal
- Kim Il-hyun
- Hae Sun
- Moon Kyung-min
- Jung Young-geum
- Kang Jung-goo
- Ahn Jae-min
- Baek Soo-ryun as Park Oh-wol
- Oh Ji-yeon
- Nam Eun-ji
- Jung Yeon
- Kim Jong-soo
- Park Dong-il
- Sa Jae-won
- Park Ji-il
- Seo Kwang-jae
- Sa Chae-won

=== Special appearance ===
- Jo Hyun-jae as Jang Sung-ho (Ep. 1-2, 10)
- Park Sun-ho as Kim Jae-hwan (Ep. 1, 23-24)
- Jung Dong-hwan as Jang Tae-joon, Jang Sung-ho's father

== Production ==
First script reading took place July 6, 2017 at MBC Broadcasting Station in Sangam, Seoul, South Korea. Filming took place in Geojedo, South Korea.

== Original soundtrack ==
Hospital Ship OST Album

Soundtrack album by Various Artists
- Recorded: 2017
- Genre: Soundtrack
- Languages: Korean, English
- Labels: Pan Entertainment, RIAK

=== Part 1 ===
No.	Title	Lyrics	Music	Artist	Length
1.	"let it go, let it be"	Apollo	Apollo; Kim Seung-hyun; Park Sung-soo	RAINZ	04:26
2.	"let it go, let it be" (Inst.)		Apollo; Kim Seung-hyun; Park Sung-soo		04:26
Total length:					08:52

=== Part 2 ===
No.	Title	Lyrics	Music	Artist	Length
1.	"Strange Day" (낯선 하루)	Cadence; Lee Jong-soo; Yoon Oh-ran	Cadence; Lee Jong-soo	Ma Eun-jin (Playback)	04:02
2.	"Strange Day" (Inst.)		Cadence; Lee Jong-soo		04:02
Total length:					08:04

=== Part 3 ===
No.	Title	Lyrics	Music	Artist	Length
1.	"Touch Of Love"	Apollon; Heo Sung-jin	Heo Sung-jin; Ha Young-joo; Hong Sung-joon	Yang Da-il	03:45
2.	"Touch Of Love" (Inst.)		Heo Sung-jin; Ha Young-joo; Hong Sung-joon		03:45
Total length:					07:30

=== Part 4 ===
No.	Title	Lyrics	Music	Artist	Length
1.	"I Feel Love"	Kim Bum-joo	Kim Bum-joo	Soyeon (Laboum)	03:32
2.	"I Feel Love" (Inst.)		Kim Bum-joo		03:32
Total length:					07:04

=== Part 5 ===
No.	Title	Lyrics	Music	Artist	Length
1.	"Stain" (얼룩)	Jung Min-wook	Yang Sung-woo; Lee Jong-soo	Chahee (Melody Day)	02:58
2.	"Stain" (Inst.)		Yang Sung-woo; Lee Jong-soo		02:58
3.	"Stain" (Ballad Ver.)	Jung Min-wook	Yang Sung-woo; Lee Jong-soo	Chahee (Melody Day)	02:58
4.	"Stain" (Ballad Ver. (Inst.))		Yang Sung-woo; Lee Jong-soo		02:58
Total length:					11:52

=== Special Track ===
No.	Title	Lyrics	Music	Artists	Length
1.	"Strange Day" (낯선 하루 (Acoustic Ver.))	Cadence; Lee Jong-soo; Yoon Oh-ran	Cadence; Lee Jong-soo	Ma Eun-jin	04:02
2.	"Strange Day" (Guitar Ver.)		Cadence; Lee Jong-soo		04:02
3.	"Strange Day" (Piano Ver.)		Cadence; Lee Jong-soo		04:02
4.	"Strange Day" (Bossa Ver.)		Cadence; Lee Jong-soo		04:02
5.	"Strange Day" (Slow Guitar Ver.)		Cadence; Lee Jong-soo		04:02
6.	"Strange Day" (Slow Piano Ver.)		Cadence; Lee Jong-soo		04:02
7.	"After the rain"			Various Artists	3:01
8.	"Lean on your shoulder"			Various Artists	3:52
9.	"Memories"			Various Artists	2:22
10.	"Seaside in autumn"			Various Artists	3:32
11.	"Warm Gaze"			Various Artists	4:52
12.	"Voyage"			Various Artists	2:04
Total length:					42:12

== Ratings ==
- In the table below, the blue numbers represent the lowest ratings and the red numbers represent the highest ratings.
- NR denotes that the drama did not rank in the top 20 daily programs on that date.

Episode #	Original Broadcast Date	Average Audience Share			
Episode #	Original Broadcast Date	TNmS Ratings		AGB Nielsen	
Episode #	Original Broadcast Date	Nationwide	Seoul National Capital Area	Nationwide	Seoul National Capital Area
1	August 30, 2017	10.8% (9th)	11.4% (6th)	10.6% (7th)	11.9% (5th)
2	August 30, 2017	11.9% (7th)	12.5% (4th)	12.4% (4th)	13.8% (4th)
3	August 31, 2017	8.9% (12th)	9.5% (7th)	8.9% (9th)	9.9% (6th)
4	August 31, 2017	9.9% (7th)	10.5% (6th)	10.7% (5th)	11.4% (3rd)
5	September 6, 2017	9.1% (10th)	10.1% (5th)	10.3% (8th)	10.5% (5th)
6	September 6, 2017	10.7% (7th)	12.1% (4th)	11.8% (4th)	11.9% (4th)
7	September 7, 2017	10.2% (9th)	11.4% (6th)	11.3% (6th)	11.7% (5th)
8	September 7, 2017	11.8% (6th)	12.5% (3rd)	13.0% (4th)	13.6% (3rd)
9	September 13, 2017	9.6% (9th)	9.7% (7th)	9.8% (9th)	10.2% (8th)
10	September 13, 2017	11.7% (7th)	11.2% (4th)	12.0% (4th)	12.1% (4th)
11	September 14, 2017	10.1% (9th)	10.1% (9th)	11.0% (6th)	11.6% (6th)
12	September 14, 2017	11.5% (7th)	11.2% (6th)	12.9% (4th)	13.2% (4th)
13	September 20, 2017	9.8% (9th)	10.4% (7th)	9.8% (9th)	10.4% (6th)
14	September 20, 2017	11.1% (7th)	12.1% (4th)	11.6% (6th)	12.0% (4th)
15	September 21, 2017	9.3% (12th)	9.7% (9th)	10.5% (8th)	11.0% (5th)
16	September 21, 2017	11.3% (7th)	11.5% (4th)	12.4% (4th)	12.6% (4th)
17	September 27, 2017	9.2% (15th)	9.0% (10th)	9.8% (8th)	9.8% (9th)
18	September 27, 2017	10.8% (10th)	11.0% (7th)	10.6% (7th)	10.6% (5th)
19	September 28, 2017	8.5% (15th)	9.2% (10th)	9.3% (11th)	9.5% (11th)
20	September 28, 2017	10.1% (8th)	10.7% (7th)	11.3% (6th)	11.4% (6th)
21	October 4, 2017	5.5% (18th)	6.4% (8th)	5.6% (14th)	5.8% (13th)
22	October 4, 2017	6.8% (10th)	7.5% (5th)	6.6% (9th)	6.8% (9th)
23	October 5, 2017	6.3% (19th)	7.1% (15th)	7.1% (16th)	6.7% (15th)
24	October 5, 2017	7.3% (15th)	8.3% (9th)	8.3% (11th)	8.1% (11th)
25	October 11, 2017	8.9% (14th)	9.4% (9th)	7.5% (16th)	6.7% (15th)
26	October 11, 2017	10.2% (9th)	10.3% (7th)	9.3% (9th)	8.4% (11th)
27	October 12, 2017	6.5% (NR)	6.6% (18th)	8.5% (13th)	8.6% (13th)
28	October 12, 2017	7.6% (16th)	7.9% (12th)	10.0% (8th)	9.8% (10th)
29	October 18, 2017 (Note: Delayed by an hour due to a football match.)	8.1% (15th)	8.6% (12th)	8.3% (10th)	8.9% (8th)
30	October 18, 2017	8.6% (11th)	8.7% (11th)	8.6% (8th)	9.1% (7th)
31	October 19, 2017	7.0% (NR)	6.9% (NR)	7.1% (NR)	7.2% (19th)
32	October 19, 2017	8.7% (14th)	8.0% (15th)	8.7% (12th)	8.4% (13th)
33	October 25, 2017 (Note: Delayed by 30 minutes due to a football match.)	6.5% (NR)	5.8% (NR)	7.3% (16th)	7.4% (15th)
34	October 25, 2017	7.3% (17th)	6.6% (17th)	7.9% (13th)	7.8% (12th)
35	October 26, 2017	6.6% (NR)	6.3% (NR)	7.0% (NR)	7.5% (17th)
36	October 26, 2017	7.7% (16th)	7.0% (16th)	8.4% (11th)	8.3% (11th)
37	November 1, 2017	6.6% (15th)	6.3% (17th)	7.2% (12th)	6.9% (14th)
38	November 1, 2017	8.1% (9th)	8.2% (8th)	9.0% (5th)	8.5% (7th)
39	November 2, 2017	6.4% (NR)	6.6% (18th)	7.2% (18th)	7.4% (14th)
40	November 2, 2017	7.4% (15th)	7.2% (15th)	8.6% (9th)	9.1% (9th)
Average		8.86%	9.14%	9.46%	9.66%

== Awards and nominations ==
Year	Award	Category	Recipient	Result	Ref.
2017	10th Korea Drama Awards	Hallyu Star Award	Kwon Mina	Won	
2017	36th MBC Drama Awards	Grand Prize (Daesang)	Ha Ji-won	Nominated	
2017	36th MBC Drama Awards	Top Excellence Award, Actress in a Miniseries	Ha Ji-won	Won	
2017	36th MBC Drama Awards	Popularity Award, Actress	Ha Ji-won	Nominated	
2017	36th MBC Drama Awards	Excellence Award, Actor in a Miniseries	Kang Min-hyuk	Nominated	
2017	36th MBC Drama Awards	Popularity Award, Actor	Kang Min-hyuk	Nominated	
2017	36th MBC Drama Awards	Excellence Award, Actress in a Miniseries	Jung Kyung-soon	Nominated	
2017	36th MBC Drama Awards	Excellence Award, Actress in a Miniseries	Wang Ji-won	Nominated	
2017	36th MBC Drama Awards	Golden Acting Award, Actor in a Miniseries	Kim Kwang-kyu	Nominated	
2017	36th MBC Drama Awards	Golden Acting Award, Actress in a Miniseries	Park Joon-geum	Nominated	
2017	36th MBC Drama Awards	Best New Actor	Lee Seo-won	Nominated	
2017	36th MBC Drama Awards	Best New Actress	Kwon Mina	Nominated	

== International broadcast ==
- In Singapore, Malaysia, Indonesia and Hong Kong, the series started airing on Oh!K from August 31, 2017.
- In Myanmar, the series airing on Channel-7 HD (Myanmar) and CANAL+MAE MADE HD.
- In Japan, the series airing on KNTV.
- In Philippines, the series will be airing on TV5 this 2021.
- In Vietnam, the series will air on VTV3 starting July 3, 2018.
- In India, the series aired on Zee Anmol under the title Aspataal Ka Jahaaz, on Upconing (2018)
- Hospital Ship Drama is available online in Hindi dubbed on MX Player and Playflix in India.
