= Oh, the Mysterious =

South Korean television series

- Promotional poster
- Also known as: Questionable Start
- Hangul: 의문의 일승
- Lit.: Doubtful Victory
- RR: Uimunui ilseung
- MR: Ŭimunŭi ilsŭng
- Genre: Crime
- Written by: Lee Hyun-joo
- Directed by: Shin Kyung-soo
- Starring: Yoon Kyun-sang; Jung Hye-sung
- Music by: Kim Soo-jin
- Country of origin: South Korea
- Original language: Korean
- No. of episodes: 40

Production
- Executive producer: Kim Dong-rae
- Camera setup: Single-camera
- Running time: 35 minutes
- Production companies: RaemongRaein Co., Ltd.

Original release
- Network: SBS TV
- Release: November 27, 2017 – January 30, 2018

Oh, the Mysterious (Korean: 의문의 일승; RR: Uimunui ilseung; lit. 'Doubtful Victory') is a South Korean television series starring Yoon Kyun-sang and Jung Hye-sung. It aired on SBS from November 27, 2017, to January 30, 2018, on Mondays and Tuesdays at 22:00 (KST) for 40 episodes.

== Synopsis ==
About a framed escapee turned fake police detective (Yoon Kyun-sang) taking down bad criminals and learns to uncover his true identity.

== Cast ==
=== Main ===
- Yoon Kyun-sang as Kim Jong-sam/Oh Il-seung

A framed ex-convict and prison escapee who becomes a fake detective that becomes a part of Metropolitan Investigation Unit. He is smart and fast at what he does while being handsome and firm.

- Jung Hye-sung as Jin Jin-young

An inspector of the investigation unit who is smart, athletic with an impressive performance record.

=== Supporting ===
==== Seoul Metropolitan Police Agency ====
- Kim Hee-won as Park Soo-chil
- Do Ki-seok as Kim Min-pyo
- Kang Shin-hyo as Kwon Dae-woong
- Choi Won-young as Jang Pil-seong
- Im Hyun-sik as Jo Man-seok

==== Institute for Future Economics ====
- Jun Gook-hwan as Lee Kwang-ho
- Kim Young-pil as Ahn Tae-jung

==== Food Company ====
- Yoon Yoo-sun as Kook Soo-ran
  - Kim Hye-yoon as young Kook Soo-ran
- Park Sung-geun as Kwak Young-jae
- Oh Seung-hoon as Gi Myeon-jung
- Kim Dong-won as Baek Kyung

=== Others ===
- Jang Hyun-sung as Kang Cheol-gi
- Kwon Hwa-woon as Hyeon Jin-gyeom
- Choi Hyo-eun as Kim-ji
- Jeon Sung-woo as Scab
  - Kim Ye-jun as young Scab
- Kim Da-ye as Cha Eun-bi
  - Ok Ye-rin as Young Cha Eun-bi
- Baek Eun-hye as Nurse
- Jeon Ye-seo as Han Cha-kyung
- Yoon Bok-in as Yoo Kwang-mi
- Choi Dae-hoon as Kim Yoon-soo
- Moon Woo-jin as Han Kang
- Jason Scott Nelson as Drug lord
- Jeon No-min as Jin Jung-gil
- Yoon Na-moo as Song Il-chun

== Production ==
The series is directed by Shin Kyung-soo of Deep Rooted Tree (2011) and Six Flying Dragons (2015) and written by Lee Hyun-joo of School 2013 (2012).

== Original soundtrack ==
Oh, the Mysterious OST Album

Soundtrack album by Various Artists
- Released: 2017
- Genre: Soundtrack
- Languages: Korean, English
- Labels: RaemongRaein Co., Ltd. Warner

=== Part 1 ===
No.	Title	Lyrics	Music	Artist	Length
1.	"Like Rain, Like Music" (비처럼 음악처럼)	Park Sung-sik	Park Sung-sik	Im Do-hyuk	4:02
2.	"Like Rain, Like Music" (Inst.)		Park Sung-sik		4:02
Total length:					8:04

=== Part 2 ===
No.	Title	Lyrics	Music	Artist	Length
1.	"Doubtful Victory" (의문의 일승)	Park Sung-sik	Park Sung-sik	Soul Dive	3:31
2.	"Doubtful Victory" (Inst.)		Park Sung-sik		3:31
Total length:					7:02

=== Part 3 ===
No.	Title	Lyrics	Music	Artist	Length
1.	"Not Love" (사랑이 아니라도)	Jung Han-jong	Eom Joo-hyuk	Gyepy	4:16
2.	"Not Love" (Humming Ver.)		Eom Joo-hyuk		4:16
Total length:					8:32

== Ratings ==
- In the table below, the blue numbers represent the lowest ratings and the red numbers represent the highest ratings.
- NR denotes that the series did not rank in the top 20 daily programs on that date.

Ep.	Original broadcast date	Average audience share			
Ep.	Original broadcast date	TNmS		AGB Nielsen	
Ep.	Original broadcast date	Nationwide	Seoul	Nationwide	Seoul
2017
1	November 27, 2017	4.1% (NR)	4.5% (NR)	5.0% (NR)	5.4% (NR)
2	November 27, 2017	5.2% (NR)	5.7% (NR)	5.4% (NR)	6.0% (NR)
3	November 28, 2017	4.0% (NR)	4.2% (NR)	4.5% (NR)	4.7% (NR)
4	November 28, 2017	4.2% (NR)	4.3% (NR)	4.9% (NR)	5.0% (NR)
5	December 4, 2017	5.8% (NR)	6.7% (NR)	6.9% (NR)	8.0% (14th)
6	December 4, 2017	6.4% (NR)	7.3% (16th)	7.6% (16th)	8.4% (16th)
7	December 5, 2017	5.8% (NR)	5.8% (20th)	6.6% (19th)	7.5% (15th)
8	December 5, 2017	6.6% (17th)	6.2% (18th)	7.5% (13th)	8.2% (9th)
9	December 11, 2017	5.4% (NR)	5.7% (NR)	6.4% (NR)	6.6% (NR)
10	December 11, 2017	6.3% (NR)	6.6% (20th)	7.8% (18th)	9.3% (10th)
11	December 12, 2017	5.5% (NR)	6.2% (18th)	6.6% (19th)	7.0% (18th)
12	December 12, 2017	5.7% (NR)	6.2% (16th)	7.7% (14th)	8.2% (10th)
13	December 18, 2017	5.2% (NR)	5.9% (NR)	6.6% (NR)	7.3% (19th)
14	December 18, 2017	5.8% (NR)	6.4% (NR)	7.3% (19th)	7.9% (14th)
15	December 19, 2017	5.6% (NR)	6.2% (15th)	6.7% (19th)	7.5% (17th)
16	December 19, 2017	5.7% (NR)	5.9% (17th)	7.6% (15th)	8.4% (8th)
17	December 25, 2017	4.3% (NR)	4.4% (NR)	5.7% (NR)	5.8% (NR)
18	December 25, 2017	5.6% (NR)	6.0% (NR)	7.1% (NR)	7.6% (15th)
19	December 26, 2017	5.5% (NR)	6.1% (NR)	5.6% (NR)	6.2% (19th)
20	December 26, 2017	6.0% (NR)	6.6% (NR)	6.3% (17th)	6.9% (16th)
2018
21	January 1, 2018	4.8% (NR)	5.2%	5.5% (NR)	5.9% (NR)
22	January 1, 2018	5.8% (NR)	6.1%	6.3% (NR)	6.6% (NR)
23	January 2, 2018	5.2% (NR)	5.9%	6.0% (NR)	6.8% (17th)
24	January 2, 2018	5.6% (NR)	6.2%	6.5% (17th)	7.1% (16th)
25	January 8, 2018	4.7% (NR)	5.6%	5.8% (NR)	6.7% (NR)
26	January 8, 2018	5.3% (NR)	6.0%	6.2% (NR)	6.9% (18th)
27	January 9, 2018	5.1% (NR)	6.2%	6.6% (NR)	7.6% (17th)
28	January 9, 2018	5.3% (NR)	6.4%	6.9% (19th)	7.8% (15th)
29	January 15, 2018	4.9% (NR)	5.0%	5.2% (NR)	5.7% (NR)
30	January 15, 2018	5.2% (NR)	5.4%	5.7% (NR)	5.8% (NR)
31	January 16, 2018	5.0% (NR)	5.3%	5.5% (NR)	5.7% (NR)
32	January 16, 2018	5.5% (NR)	6.5%	6.4% (NR)	7.3% (15th)
33	January 22, 2018	5.5% (NR)	6.1%	6.6% (NR)	7.2% (18th)
34	January 22, 2018	6.4% (NR)	6.9%	7.7% (16th)	8.2% (11th)
35	January 23, 2018	6.5% (19th)	7.1%	7.7% (13th)	8.3% (10th)
36	January 23, 2018	6.9% (18th)	7.4%	8.5% (12th)	9.1% (8th)
37	January 29, 2018	6.5% (NR)	7.0%	7.1% (18th)	7.7% (15th)
38	January 29, 2018	6.9% (NR)	7.3%	8.1% (14th)	8.5% (14th)
39	January 30, 2018	6.9% (15th)	7.6%	7.7% (12th)	8.5% (8th)
40	January 30, 2018	8.2% (11th)	8.9%	9.0% (8th)	9.8% (6th)
Average		5.6%	6.1%	6.6%	7.2%

== Awards and nominations ==
Year	Award	Category	Nominee	Result	Ref.
2017	25th SBS Drama Awards	Top Excellence Award, Actor in a Monday–Tuesday Drama	Yoon Kyun-sang	Nominated	
2017	25th SBS Drama Awards	Excellence Award, Actress in a Monday–Tuesday Drama	Jung Hye-sung	Nominated	
2018	11th Korea Drama Awards	Best New Actress	Jung Hye-sung	Nominated	

== International broadcast ==
- In Singapore and Malaysia, the series aired within 24 hours after its original South Korean broadcast on Sony One under the title Doubtful Victory.
