= Lim Ju-eun =

South Korean actress (born 1988)

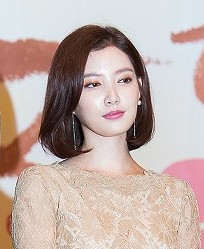
- Lim in 2016
- Born: January 7, 1988 (age 38); South Korea
- Other name: Im Joo-eun
- Occupation: Actress
- Years active: 2005–present
- Agent: SidusHQ

Korean name
- Hangul: 임주은
- RR: Im Jueun
- MR: Im Chuŭn

Lim Ju-eun (Korean: 임주은; born January 7, 1988) is a South Korean actress.

== Career ==
Lim is best known her roles in the horror thriller Soul (also known as Hon), the campus musical drama What's Up, and the quirky rom-com Wild Romance. In 2014, she co-starred in the web series One Sunny Day with So Ji-sub.

In September 2018, Lim signed with new agency Hunus Entertainment.

In November 2022, Lim left Hunus Entertainment and signed with a new agency SidusHQ.

== Filmography ==
=== Film ===
Year	Title	Role	Notes	Ref.
2005	Wuthering Heights (폭풍의 언덕)			
2006	Baek Rim (백림)		Short film	
2007	A Nymph of a Lamp (램프의 요정)	Soo-jung		
2007	Are You Crazy or Not?! (미친 거 아니야?!)	Lee Ji-hye		
2015	Remember You	Bo-young		

=== Television series ===
Year	Title	Role	Ref.
2006	Drama City: "Pokhara"		
2007	Merry Mary	Lee Ah-moon	
2009	Soul	Yoon Ha-na	
2011	What's Up	Oh Doo-ri	
2012	Wild Romance	Kim Dong-ah	
2012	Arang and the Magistrate	Mu-yeon (cameo)	
2013	The Heirs	Jeon Hyun-joo	
2014	Empress Ki	Bayan Khutugh	
2014	Endless Love	Kyung-hwa (cameo)	
2016	Uncontrollably Fond	Yoon Jeong-eun	
2017	Bad Thief, Good Thief	Yoon Hwa-young	
2020	Lie After Lie	Eun Se-mi	
2023	Live Your Own Life	Choi Sook-yung	
2024	The Brave Yong Su-jeong	Choi Hye-ra	

=== Television shows ===
Year	Title	Notes	Ref.
2006	King Saturday – "Youth Investigates Life"		
2017	Living Together in Empty Room	Cast member with Highlight's Yoon Doo-joon and DinDin (Episodes 20–)	
2018	King of Mask Singer	As "Princess Biona" (Episode 181)	

=== Music video appearances ===
Year	Song title	Artist	Ref.
2009	"Ghost" (령혼)	Yangpa	
2009	"Lies (Ballad ver.)" (거짓말)	T-ara	
2010	"Can't Forget" (못 잊어)	Kim Jong-kook	
2012	"Day by Day 2012"	As One	
2014	"You You You" (너를 너를 너를)	Fly to the Sky	

== Awards and nominations ==
Name of the award ceremony, year presented, category, nominee of the award, and the result of the nomination
Award ceremony	Year	Category	Nominee / Work	Result	Ref.
KTF Bigi Big Nationwide Auditions	2004	Gold Medal	Lim Ju-eun	Won	
MBC Drama Awards	2009	Best New Actress	Soul	Won	
MBC Drama Awards	2017	Excellence Award, Actress in a Weekend Drama	Bad Thief, Good Thief	Nominated	
