= Kim Sang-joong =

South Korean actor (born 1965)

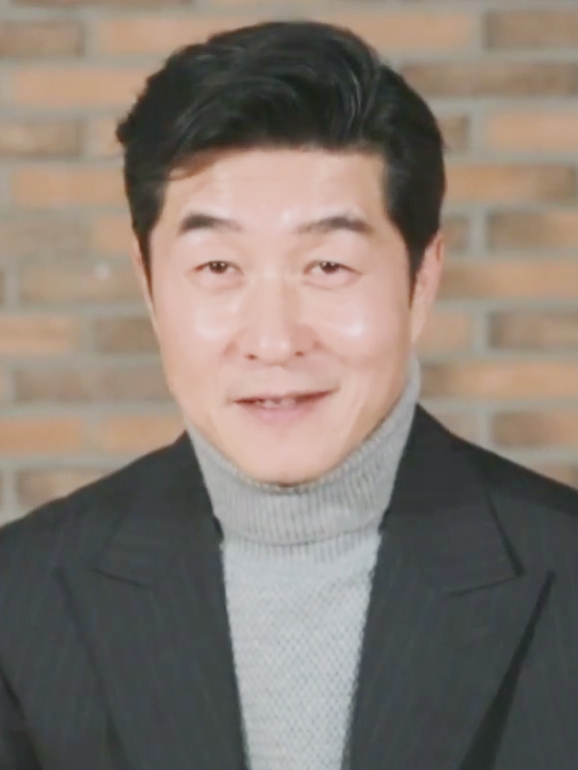
- Kim in 2017
- Born: August 6, 1965 (age 61); Busan, South Korea
- Education: Dongguk University - Theater and Film Studies
- Occupation: Actor
- Years active: 1990–present
- Spouse: Unknown (m. 1991; div. 1999)
- Children: 1

Korean name
- Hangul: 김상중
- Hanja: 金相中
- RR: Gim Sangjung
- MR: Kim Sangjung

Kim Sang-joong (born August 6, 1965) is a South Korean actor. He is best known for starring in the television dramas My Husband's Woman (2007), City Hunter (2011), and The Chaser (2012). He won the Grand Prize at the MBC Drama Awards for his performance in the historical television series The Rebel (2017).

== Career ==
Before becoming an actor, Kim Sang-joong was enlisted in the Marine Corps. But after graduating from Dongguk University with a degree in Theater and Film, he embarked on an acting career at age 25. Kim made his acting debut in the stage play I Love Bread in 1990, and was one of the co-founders of the theater troupe Extreme Legend. He soon transitioned to film and television, and became known for his distinctive voice and confident and charismatic acting, often as morally ambiguous characters. Among his notable roles in television dramas include a middle-aged man having an affair with his wife's best friend in My Husband's Woman (2007), the titular besieged monarch in Eight Days, Assassination Attempts against King Jeongjo (2007), a former agent who trains his foster son as a weapon in his plans for revenge in City Hunter (2011), and a presidential candidate willing to go to any lengths to win, including murder and cover-up, in The Chaser (2012).

On the big screen, Kim was praised for his comic acting in the gangster comedy My Boss, My Teacher (2006), and has also starred in arthouse films directed by Hong Sang-soo, such as The Day He Arrives (2011) and Our Sunhi (2013).

Since 2008, Kim has hosted Unanswered Questions, a long-running program with a similar format to Unsolved Mysteries.

== Personal life ==
Kim is the third child among six siblings, and has two brothers and three sisters. He married in 1991, but he and his wife divorced in 1999. They have one son, born in 1993.

== Filmography ==
=== Film ===
Year	Title	Role
1991	Money, Money, Money	Jung-ah
1992	The Love War	Charlie Brown
1996	Grown-ups Grill the Herring	Bae Hyun-soo (cameo)
1997	Maria and the Inn	Ki-tae
2000	The Promenade	Lee Young-hoon
2000	Anarchists	Han Myung-gon
2000	Jakarta	Hae-ryong
2001	My Boss, My Hero	Doo-shik's boss (cameo)
2002	An Unlikely Farewell (short film)	
2006	My Boss, My Teacher	Oh Sang-jung
2006	Hanbando	Emperor Gojong
2006	Holy Daddy	Jang Seok-jo/Angel
2006	Flushed Away	Le Frog (voice, Korean dubbed)
2008	Like Father, Like Son	Tae-soo
2009	City of Damnation	Yang Kwang-seob
2011	The Day He Arrives	Young-ho
2013	Our Sunhi	Choi Dong-hyun
2019	The Bad Guys: Reign of Chaos	Oh Gu-tak

=== Television series ===
Year	Title	Role
1992	Sons and Daughters	Mi-yeon's uncle
1992	It's You	Yoon Bong-gil
1992	The Sun Shone Outside the Window	Choi Chang-soo
1993	3rd Republic	Park Sang-hee
1993	Adolescence	Teacher Kim
1993	Mountain Wind	
1994	Stranger in Paradise	Myeong-gyu
1994	My Son's Woman	Jang Han-soo
1995	Kim Gu	Kim Gu
1995	Do You Remember Love?	Joo-hyeong
1995	4th Republic	Mun Se-gwang
1995	Men of the Bath House	Kang Ho-joon
1996	Widow	Lee Jong-sang
1997	The Mountain	Uncle Woo-tae
1997	Woman Next Door	Na Kang-woo
1997	When She Beckons	Kim In-wook
1998	As We Live Our Lives	
1998	Lie	Lee Dong-jin
1998	Hong Gil-dong	Lee Eop
1998	Crush	Oh Chang-soo
1998	Paper Crane	Jo Moon-hyeong
1999	Tomato	Cha Gi-joon
1999	Ghost	Ji Seung-don
1999	Sweet Bride	
2000	Legends of Love	Jeong-hwan
2000	SWAT Police	Baek Seong-cheol
2002	The Dawn of the Empire	King Gwangjong
2004	Human Market	Yoo Ki-ha
2004	Choice	Lee Hae-joon
2006	Princess Hours	Crown Prince Lee Soo
2007	My Husband's Woman	Hong Joon-pyo
2007	Eight Days, Assassination Attempts against King Jeongjo	King Jeongjo
2008	Mom's Dead Upset	Na Sam-seok
2010	Life Is Beautiful	Yang Byung-joon
2011	City Hunter	Lee Jin-pyo/Steve Lee
2012	The Chaser	Kang Dong-yoon
2013	Master's Sun	Mystery Z TV host (cameo, episode 2)
2013	Golden Rainbow	Kim Han-joo
2014	A New Leaf	Cha Young-woo
2014	Doctor Stranger	Park Cheol (Guest)
2014	Bad Guys	Oh Gu-tak
2015	The Jingbirok: A Memoir of Imjin War	Yu Seong-ryong
2017	The Rebel	Hong Ah-mo-gae
2019	The Banker	Noh Dae-ho
2024	Knight Flower	Seok Ji-sung

=== Hosting ===
Year	Title
1998	Depth! Accident of Human
2008–present	Unanswered Questions
2014	Super Bike
2021	The Soldiers
2022	Somehow Adult 2

== Theater ==
Year	English title	Korean title	Role	Ref.
2022–2023	Misery	미저리	Paul Sheldon	

== Awards and nominations ==
Year presented, name of the award ceremony, award category, nominated work and the result of the nomination
Year	Award	Category	Nominated work	Result
1997	18th Blue Dragon Film Awards	Best Supporting Actor	Maria and the Inn	Nominated
2000	37th Grand Bell Awards	Best New Actor	The Promenade	Nominated
2000	SBS Drama Awards	Excellence Award, Actor	Legends of Love, SWAT Police	Won
2000	SBS Drama Awards	Big Star Award	Legends of Love, SWAT Police	Won
2002	KBS Drama Awards	Top Excellence Award, Actor	The Dawn of the Empire	Won
2003	39th Baeksang Arts Awards	Best Actor (TV)	The Dawn of the Empire	Nominated
2006	29th Golden Cinematography Awards	Special Jury Prize	My Boss, My Teacher	Won
2007	1st Korea Drama Awards	Top Excellence Award, Actor	My Husband's Woman	Won
2007	SBS Drama Awards	Excellence Award, Actor in Miniseries	My Husband's Woman	Won
2011	SBS Drama Awards	Special Award, Actor in a Drama Special	City Hunter	Nominated
2012	5th Korea Drama Awards	Top Excellence Award, Actor	The Chaser	Won
2012	1st K-Drama Star Awards	Top Excellence Award, Actor	The Chaser	Nominated
2012	SBS Entertainment Awards	Achievement Award	Unanswered Questions	Won
2012	SBS Drama Awards	Excellence Award, Actor in a Miniseries	The Chaser	Won
2013	MBC Drama Awards	Golden Acting Award, Actor	Golden Rainbow	Won
2014	41st Korea Broadcasting Awards	Best Performer, TV Host category	Unanswered Questions	Won
2014	MBC Drama Awards	Excellence Award, Actor in a Miniseries	A New Leaf	Won
2015	4th APAN Star Awards	Top Excellence Award, Actor in a Serial Drama	The Jingbirok: A Memoir of Imjin War	Won
2015	KBS Drama Awards	Top Excellence Award, Actor in a Serial Drama	The Jingbirok: A Memoir of Imjin War	Nominated
2015	KBS Drama Awards	Excellence Award, Actor in a Serial Drama	The Jingbirok: A Memoir of Imjin War	Nominated
2017	10th Korea Drama Awards	Grand Prize (Daesang)	The Rebel	Won
2017	8th Korean Popular Culture Awards	Presidential Recommendation	—N/a	Won
2017	MBC Drama Awards	Grand Prize (Daesang)	The Rebel	Won
2017	MBC Drama Awards	Top Excellence Award, Actor in a Monday-Tuesday Drama	The Rebel	Nominated
2017	MBC Drama Awards	Best Character Award, Fighting Spirit Acting	The Rebel	Nominated
2018	54th Baeksang Arts Awards	Best Actor (TV)	The Rebel	Nominated
2019	MBC Drama Awards	Top Excellence Award, Actor in a Wednesday-Thursday Miniseries	The Banker	Nominated
