= Shin Eun-jung =

South Korean actress (born 1974)

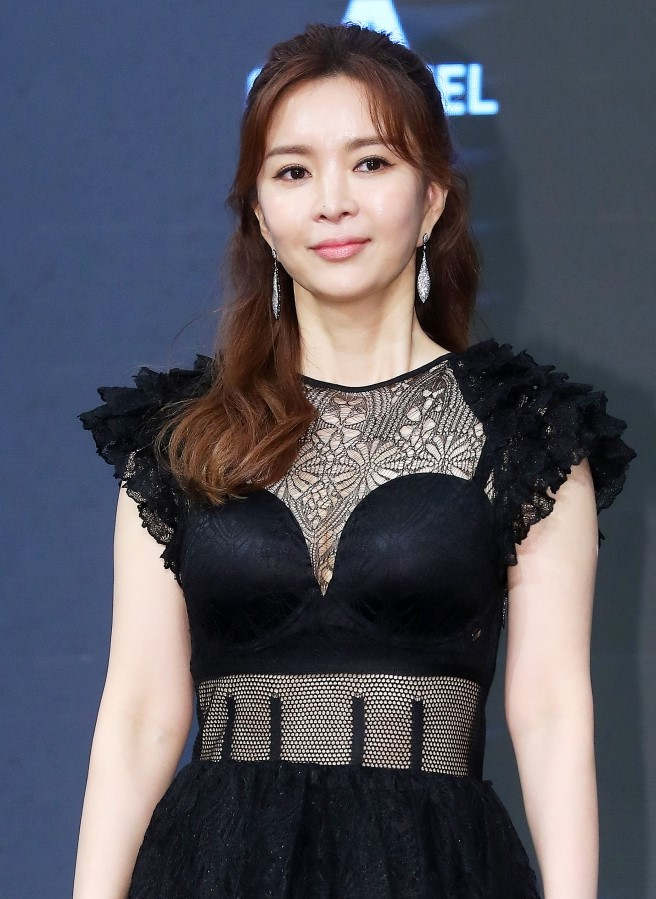
- Shin in April 2023
- Born: January 3, 1974 (age 52); Busan, South Korea
- Education: Seoul Institute of the Arts - Theater
- Occupation: Actress
- Years active: 1997–present
- Agent: Popeye Entertainment
- Spouse: Park Sung-woong (m. 2008)
- Children: 1

Korean name
- Hangul: 신은정
- RR: Sin Eunjeong
- MR: Sin Ŭnjŏng

Shin Eun-jung (Korean: 신은정; born January 3, 1974) is a South Korean actress. She has played supporting roles in television dramas such as The Legend (2007), East of Eden (2008) and Faith (2012).

== Filmography ==
=== Film ===
Year	Title	Role	Ref.
2001	Ahmijimong	Eun-jung	
2002	Over the Rainbow	Young-mi	
2002	Fox Rain		
2007	Two Faces of My Girlfriend	Sang-hee	
2009	Possessed	Detective Tae-hwan's wife	
2016	Canola	Myeong-ok	
2022	2037	Seon-su	
2025	You Are the Apple of my Eye	Jinwoo's mom	

=== Television series ===
Year	Title	Role	Notes	Ref.
1998	Shadows of an Old Love			
1998	Spring After Winter	Jung Soo-jin		
1998	Song of the Wind			
1999	Hometown of Legends: "Jae-in's Wife"	Som-som-yi		
1999	KAIST	Shin Nam-hee		
1999	Days of Delight	Gong Moon-ja		
2000	The More I Love You	Han Shin-hye		
2000	Roll of Thunder	Heo Gyun's second wife		
2001	Three Friends	High school hubae Shin Eun-jung	Cameo	
2001	Ladies of the Palace	Queen Inseong		
2001	MBC Best Theater: "Fish at the End of the Sea"	Yeon-jung		
2003	The King's Woman	Kang-ah		
2003	Like a Flowing River	So-ra		
2004	Jang Gil-san	Jang Gil-san's biological mother		
2004	MBC Best Theater: "But Remember"	Soo-hyun		
2004	Drama City: "Cruel Fairytale"	Min-hee		
2004	True Story: Crime and Punishment	Prosecutor		
2004	Lotus Flower Fairy	Kang Joon-young		
2004	Terms of Endeartment	Baek Min-joo		
2007	The Legend	Dalbi		
2008	Formidable Rivals	Kang Soo-ryun		
2008	East of Eden	Yoo Mi-ae/Rebecca		
2009	Hilarious Housewives	Jung Sun-kyung's hubae	Cameo	
2010	Pure Pumpkin Flower	Oh Kyung-bok		
2011	Gyebaek	Queen Seonhwa	Cameo	
2011	Saving Mrs. Go Bong-shil	Lee Jung-yeon	Cameo	
2012	Daddy's Sorry	Hee-sook		
2012	Faith	Hwasuin		
2014	Inspiring Generation	Kim Sung-deok		
2014	Bride of the Century	Ma Jae-ran		
2014	Endless Love	Gyeong-ja		
2014	Reset	Section chief Han		
2014	Single-minded Dandelion	Choi Joo-hee	Cameo	
2014	Misaeng: Incomplete Life	Sun Ji-young		
2015	Hyde Jekyll, Me	Kang Hee-ae		
2015	Splendid Politics	Queen Inmok		
2016	Working Mom Parenting Daddy	Yoon Jeong-hyun		
2017	The Rebel	Geum-ok		
2017	Bad Thief, Good Thief	Min Hae-won		
2017	While You Were Sleeping	Kim Joo-young	Special appearance	
2018	Lawless Lawyer	Choi Jin-ae		
2019	Jin Choo-Ha Returns	Jung-hee		
2021	Navillera	Ae-ran		
2023	Queen of Masks	Joo Yoo-jeong		
2023	Between Him and Her	Choi Myung-sook		
2024	Bad Memory Eraser	Song Mi-seon		
2025	Bon Appétit, Your Majesty	Queen Dowager Jahyeon		

=== Web series ===
Year	Title	Role	Ref.
2022	Dr. Park's Clinic	Sunwoo Su-zy	

=== Television shows ===
Year	Title	Role	Ref.
2013	MasterChef Korea Celebrity	Contestant	

== Awards and nominations ==
Name of the award ceremony, year presented, category, nominee of the award, and the result of the nomination
Award ceremony	Year	Category	Nominee / Work	Result	Ref.
MBC Drama Awards	2008	Golden Acting Award, Supporting Actress	East of Eden	Won	
MBC Drama Awards	2017	Excellence Award, Actress in a Weekend Drama	Bad Thief, Good Thief	Nominated	
SBS Drama Awards	2012	Special Acting Award, Actress in a Miniseries	Faith	Nominated	
