= The House Detox =

South Korean television show

- Promotional Poster
- Hangul: 신박한 정리
- RR: Sinbakhan jeongni
- MR: Sinbakhan chŏngni
- Genre: Reality
- Starring: Shin Ae-ra (Season 1); Park Na-rae (Season 1); Yoon Kyun-sang (Season 1); Lee Young-ja (Season 2)
- Country of origin: South Korea
- Original language: Korean
- No. of seasons: 2
- No. of episodes: 50

Production
- Producer: Kim Yoo-geun
- Production location: South Korea
- Running time: 70 minutes

Original release
- Network: tvN
- Release: June 29, 2020 – July 5, 2021

The House Detox (Korean: 신박한 정리) is a South Korea reality show program on tvN with Shin Ae-ra, Park Na-rae and Yoon Kyun-sang as the hosts. The show aired on tvN every Monday at 22:35 (KST) starting from June 29, 2020, and ended on July 6, 2021.

== Synopsis ==
In each episode, the 3 hosts visit different celebrities' houses to help in tidying up the houses.

== Episodes ==
=== 2020 ===
List of episodes in 2020 (episode 1–25)

Ep.	Air Date	Client (Guest)	Ref.
1	June 29	Yoon Kyun-sang	
2	July 6	Kim Ho-joong	
3	July 13	Kim Dong-hyun	
4	July 20	Jung Ju-ri	
5	July 27	Yang Dong-geun and Park Ga-ram's Family	
6	August 3	Go Joo-won	
7	August 10	Yoon Eun-hye	
8	August 17	Jang Hyun-sung and Yang Hee-jung's Family	
9	August 24	Oh Jeong-yeon	
10	August 31	Kim Mi-ryeo and Jung Sung-yoon's Family	
11	September 7	Jung Eun-pyo's Family	
12	September 14	Lee Jun-hyeok	
Special	September 21	—N/a	
13	October 5	Yoo Jae-hwan	
14	October 12	Hong Kyung-min	
15	October 19	Hwang Je-sung and Park Cho-eun	
16	October 26	Hong Seok-cheon	
17	November 2	Kim Bin-woo and Jeon Yong-jin	
18	November 9	Lee Soo-kyung	
19	November 16	Jang Gwang	
20	November 23	Park Gwang-hyun	
21	November 30	Kim Chang-yeol (DJ DOC)	
22	December 7	Park Jun-gyu	
23	December 14	Jang Young-ran	
24	December 21	Song Young-kyu	
25	December 28	Hong Ji-min	

=== 2021 ===
List of episodes in 2021 (episode 26–50)

Ep.	Air Date	Client (Guest)	Ref.
Special	January 4	—N/a	
26	January 11	Hong Rok-gi	
27	January 18	Han Tae-woong	
28	January 25	Seo Hyun-jin	
29	February 1	Jo Hye-ryun	
30	February 8	Choi Jae-won	
31	February 15	Ko Ji-yong and Heo Yang-lim	
32	February 22	Bae Dong-seong	
33	March 1	Shindong (Super Junior)	
34	March 8	Kim Ga-yeon and Lim Yo-hwan	
35	March 15	Kang Won-rae (Clon) and Kim Song	
36	March 22	Lee Kyung-ae	
37	March 29	Yuk Jin-soo and Lee Han-na	
38	April 5	Yang Han-na and Yang Jung-won	
39	April 12	Kwon Jae-kwan and Kim Kyung-ah	
40	April 19	Lee Hyung-taik	
41	April 26	Kim Yo-han	
42	May 3	Lee Dong-jun	
43	May 17	Ahn Hye-kyung	
44	May 24	Cheetah	
45	May 31	Lee Sang-ho and Lee Sang-min	
46	June 7	J-Black and Mmary	
47	June 14	Yoon Suk-min and Kim Si-eon	
48	June 21	Heo Kyung-hwan	
49	June 28	Min Woo-hyuk and Lee Se-mi	
50	July 5	Lee Ha-neul (DJ DOC)	

== Ratings ==
- Ratings listed below are the individual corner ratings of The House Detox. (Note: Individual corner ratings do not include commercial time, which regular ratings include.)
- In the ratings below, the highest rating for the show will be in red and the lowest rating for the show will be in blue each year.

=== 2020 ===
List of episodes in 2020 (episode 1–25)
The House Detox : South Korea viewers per episode (thousands)

Season	Episode number																										Average
Season	1	2	3	4	5	6	7	8	9	10	11	12	13	14	15	16	17	18	19	20	21	22	23	24	25	26	Average
1	575	580	455	557	828	731	806	902	938	N/A	1029	1009	587	785	686	626	814	638	634	663	575	504	506	638	554	727	N/A

Source: Audience measurement performed nationwide by Nielsen Media Research.

Ep. #	Original Airdate	Nielsen Korea Ratings Nationwide
1	June 29	2.941%
2	July 6	2.846%
3	July 13	2.059%
4	July 20	2.731%
5	July 27	3.354%
6	August 3	3.273%
7	August 10	3.522%
8	August 17	3.535%
9	August 24	4.123%
10	August 30	3.208%
11	September 7	4.389%
12	September 14	3.927%
Special	September 21	2.568%
13	October 5	3.468%
14	October 12	3.104%
15	October 19	2.654%
16	October 26	3.183%
17	November 2	2.678%
18	November 9	2.924%
19	November 16	3.181%
20	November 23	2.495%
21	November 30	2.018%
22	December 7	2.410%
23	December 14	2.807%
24	December 21	2.396%
25	December 28	3.225%

=== 2021 ===
List of episodes in 2021 (episode 26–50)

Ep. #	Original Airdate	Nielsen Korea Ratings Nationwide
Special	January 4	1.007%
26	January 11	2.669%
27	January 18	2.368%
28	January 25	2.024%
29	February 1	2.159%
30	February 8	1.981%
31	February 15	2.342%
32	February 22	2.449%
33	March 1	2.247%
34	March 8	3.225%
35	March 15	2.808%
36	March 22	3.387%
37	March 29	1.964%
38	April 5	2.004%
39	April 12	1.651%
40	April 19	1.892%
41	April 26	2.314%
42	May 3	2.102%
43	May 17	2.196%
44	May 24	1.431%
45	May 31	2.153%
46	June 7	2.366%
47	June 14	2.268%
48	June 21	2.367%
49	June 28	2.300%
50	July 5	2.941%
