= Soul (South Korean TV series) =

2009 crime horror drama

- Promotional poster for Soul
- Also known as: Hon; Possessed
- Genre: Horror; Crime; Romance
- Written by: In Eun-ah; Go Eun-nim; Park Young-sook
- Directed by: Kim Sang-ho; Kang Dae-sun
- Starring: Lee Seo-jin; Lim Ju-eun
- Country of origin: South Korea
- Original language: Korean
- No. of episodes: 10

Original release
- Network: MBC TV
- Release: August 5 – September 3, 2009

Soul (Korean: 혼; Hanja: 魂; RR: Hon; lit. 'Spirit'; also known as Possessed) is a 2009 South Korean crime horror television drama series, starring Lim Ju-eun and Lee Seo-jin. It is about a high school girl possessed by spirits and the criminal profiler who exploits her powers in his quest for justice, played by Im and Lee respectively. It aired on MBC from August 5 to September 3, 2009 on Wednesdays and Thursdays at 21:55 for 10 episodes.

== Plot ==
Cheerful high school girl Ha-na (Lim Ju-eun) is always the first to come out and protect her introverted twin sister Doo-na (Park Ji-yeon), who has a slight limp. After Doo-na passes away in a fire, Ha-na finds that her body no longer completely belongs to herself. Doo-na's angry spirit now lives in Ha-na, giving her special powers and monstrous strength. Genius criminal psychologist Shin Ryu (Lee Seo-jin) is an expert profiler who is determined to see justice served. When he learns about Ha-na's abilities, he uses her powers to eliminate criminals that are above the law, and to plan his revenge on the man (Kim Kap-soo) who helped his family's killer go free.

== Cast ==
- Lee Seo-jin as Shin Ryu
- Lim Ju-eun as Yoon Hana
  - Ahn Seo-hyun as young Hana
- Park Ji-yeon as Yoon Doo-na
  - Kim Ji-won as young Doo-na
- Park Geon-il as Jung Shi-woo
- Lee Jin as Lee Hye-won
- Jeon Boram as Shin So-yi
- Kim Sung-ryung as Ha-na and Doo-na's mother
- Kim Kap-soo as Baek Do-shik
- Yoo Yeon-seok as Baek Joong-chan
- Lee Kyu-han as Seo Joon-hee
- Chu Hun-yub as Kim Yoon-oh
  - Nam Da-reum as young Yoon-oh
- Jung Da-sol as Kan Ho-sa
- Kwak Min-suk
- Kim Kwang-kyu as Bae Seong-bin
- Choi Soo-eun
- Kwon Hyun-sang
- Noh Seung-jin
- Jo Han-chul
- Lee Soon-sung
- Tae Hwang
- Choi Bum-ho

== Awards and nominations ==
Year	Award	Category	Recipient	Result	Ref.
2009	MBC Drama Award	Best New Actress	Lim Ju-eun	Won	
2009	MBC Drama Award	Viewer's Favorite Drama of the Year	Soul	Nominated	
2009	DramaBeans Awards	Favourite Thriller	Soul	Nominated	
2009	DramaBeans Awards	Breakout Performance of The year	Lim Ju-eun	Nominated	
2009	DramaBeans Awards	Most Underrated Drama	Soul	Nominated	

== International broadcast ==
Premiere	Network	Region
September 3, 2009	KNTV	Japan
28 February 2010	TVB	Hong Kong
June 5, 2011	HD Jade	Hong Kong
January 18, 2014	Channel 3	Thailand
