= Yoon Kyun-sang =

South Korean actor (born 1987)

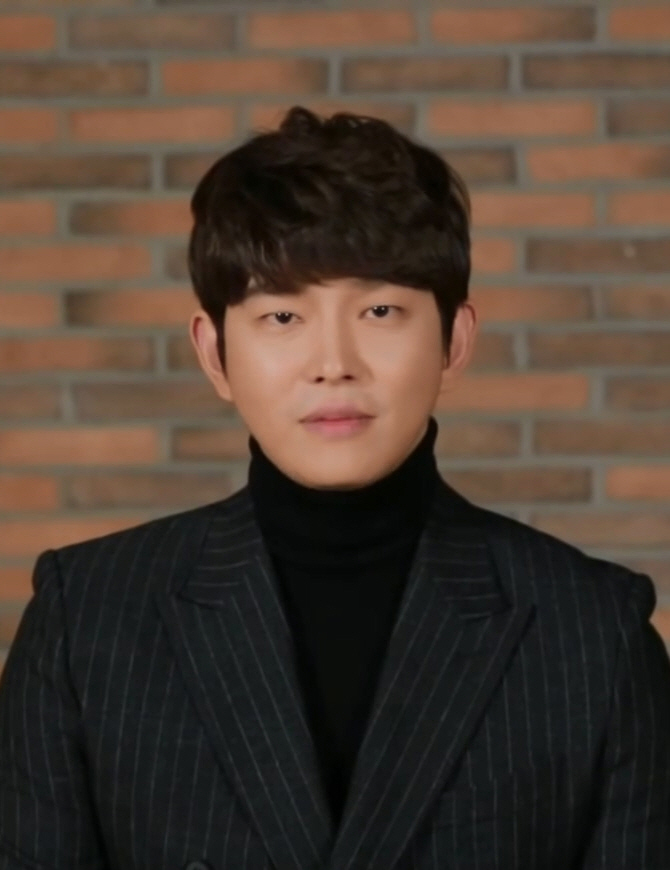
- Yoon in 2017
- Born: March 31, 1987 (age 39); Jeonju, South Korea
- Occupations: Actor; model
- Years active: 2012–present
- Agent: Management A.M.9

Korean name
- Hangul: 윤균상
- Hanja: 尹筠相
- RR: Yun Gyunsang
- MR: Yun Kyunsang

Yoon Kyun-sang (born March 31, 1987) is a South Korean actor who drew attention with his supporting roles in the television series Pinocchio (2014), Six Flying Dragons (2015–2016) and The Doctors (2016). He then played lead roles in The Rebel (2017), Oh, the Mysterious (2018), Clean with Passion for Now (2018), and Class of Lies (2019).

== Career ==
Before becoming an actor, Yoon initially worked as a model. Respecting his father's wishes, he then joined the army and completed his mandatory military service. In 2012, he debuted as an actor, starring in the historical drama Faith. He was then cast in the sports film No Breathing as a swimmer, and as the youngest detective in crime thriller Gap-dong. Yoon achieved acting recognition with his supporting role in the television series, Pinocchio.

In 2015, Yoon starred alongside Ha Ji-won and Lee Jin-wook in The Time We Were Not in Love, a remake of the Taiwanese drama In Time with You. The same year, he was cast in the historical drama Six Flying Dragons. He played a dim-witted boy who eventually becomes the greatest swordsman of Josen, rising to the head of the royal bodyguard unit that defends the king.

In 2016, Yoon starred in the popular medical drama The Doctors, as an heir to a large corporation, who became a doctor to escape the fight for inheritance. Yoon's acting in Six Flying Dragons earned him a Best New Actor award at the Grimae Awards. Yoon became a cast member of the third season of reality cooking show Three Meals a Day - Fishing Village.

In 2017, Yoon was cast in his first leading role in historical drama The Rebel, as the titular character, Hong Gil-dong. Yoon returned to join the cast of the fourth season of reality cooking show Three Meals a Day - Sea Ranch. Yoon landed his second leading role in SBS' crime drama Oh, the Mysterious.

In 2018, Yoon was cast in the romantic comedy drama Clean with Passion for Now.

In July 2019, he returned to the small screen with school crime drama Class of Lies playing double characters of a lawyer who works undercover as a teacher at an elite high school trying to discover the truth behind a murder.

In 2020, Yoon was the MC of The House Detox, a program about organizing homes, co-hosting with Shin Ae-ra and Park Na-rae.

In 2021, Yoon has confirmed he will join the TVING crime detective drama The Mansion with Lim Ji-yeon, which will air in early 2022 making a comeback two years after 2019.

In January 2022, it was reported that Yoon had terminated his contract with Hooxi Creative. Later the same day, it was reported that Yoon had signed a contract with Management A.M.9. Later on January 6, 2022, it was officially confirmed that Yoon had signed a contract with Management AM9.

== Filmography ==
=== Film ===
Year	Title	Role	Notes	Ref.
2013	Forbidden Games	Hyun-joon		
2013	No Breathing	Yun Min Sang (Swimming team member 1)		
2015	You Call It Passion	Woo Ji-han		
2023	Mount CHIAK	Lee Min-jun		

=== Television series ===
Year	Title	Role	Notes	Ref.
2012	Faith	Deok-man		
2014	Gap-dong	Youngest detective		
2014–2015	Pinocchio	Ki Jae-myung		
2015	The Time We Were Not in Love	Cha Seo-hoo		
2015–2016	Six Flying Dragons	Moo-hyul		
2016	Gogh, The Starry Night	Police officer	Cameo (Episode 18)	
2016	The Doctors	Jung Yoon-do		
2017	The Rebel	Hong Gil-dong		
2017	While You Were Sleeping	couple in meadow	Cameo (Episode 21)	
2017–2018	Oh, the Mysterious	Oh Il-seung / Kim Jong-sam		
2018–2019	Clean with Passion for Now	Jang Seon-kyul		
2019	The Nokdu Flower	Moo-hyul	Cameo (Episode 13–14)	
2019	Class of Lies	Ki Moo-hyuk / Ki Kang-jae		
2025	Marble of God	Won Go-seung		
2025	Law and the City	Kim Ji-Seok	Cameo	

=== Web series ===
Year	Title	Role	Ref.
2022	Rose Mansion	Min-su	

=== Television Show ===
Year	Title	Role	Notes	Ref.
2016	Three Meals a Day: Fishing Village 3	Cast member		
2017	Three Meals a Day: Sea Ranch	Cast member		
2020–2021	The House Detox	Host	with Shin Ae-ra and Park Na-rae	
2021	My Little Old Boy	Special MC	Episode 224	
2021	My Teenage Girl	MC		
2022	My Little Old Boy	Special MC	Episode 294	
2022–2023	Europe Outside Your Tent	Cast Member	Season 1 and 3	

=== Music video appearances ===
Year	Song Title	Artist	Ref.
2013	"Curious"	What Women Want feat. Jung Yup	
2014	"Girlfriend"	Uniqnote feat. Bobby Kim and Jung Yup	
2020	"Trumpet Creeper" (능소화)	Ahn Ye-eun ( 안예은)	

== Ambassadorship ==
- Jeonju Public Relations Ambassador (2022)

== Awards and nominations ==
Name of the award ceremony, year presented, category, nominee of the award, and the result of the nomination
Award ceremony	Year	Category	Nominee / Work	Result	Ref.
APAN Star Awards	2016	Best New Actor	The Doctors	Won	
Grimae Awards	2016	Best New Actor	Six Flying Dragons	Won	
Korea Drama Awards	2017	Excellence Award, Actor	The Rebel	Nominated	
Korea's First Brand Awards	2017	Best Male Actor	The Rebel	Won	
MBC Drama Awards	2017	Top Excellence Award, Actor in a Miniseries	The Rebel	Nominated	
MBC Drama Awards	2017	Popularity Award, Actor	The Rebel	Nominated	
MBC Entertainment Awards	2021	Rookie Award	My Teenage Girl	Nominated	
SBS Drama Awards	2015	New Star Award	Six Flying Dragons, The Time We Were Not in Love	Won	
SBS Drama Awards	2016	Excellence Award, Actor in a Genre Drama	The Doctors	Nominated	
SBS Drama Awards	2017	Top Excellence Award, Actor in a Monday–Tuesday Drama	Oh, the Mysterious	Nominated	
The Seoul Awards	2017	Best Actor (Drama)	The Rebel	Nominated	
