= Hong Kiltong (outlaw) =

Korean outlaw (c. 1440–c. 1500)

- Born: c. 1440; Jangseong County, South Jeolla Province
- Died: c. 1500 likely Hanseong

Korean name
- Hangul: 홍길동
- Hanja: 洪吉同
- RR: Hong Gildong
- MR: Hong Kiltong

Hong Kiltong (Korean: 홍길동; Hanja: 洪吉同; c. 1440–c. 1500) was a Korean outlaw from the Joseon period who is thought to have inspired the Joseon-era Korean novel Hong Gildong jeon, which features a protagonist of a similar (Note: The Hanja rendering of the names of the two Hongs differ, although they are pronounced the same and rendered the same in Hangul. The fictional character uses 童 instead of 同 for the syllable "dong" (동). Note that Hong Gildong and Hong Kiltong are different romanizations of the same Korean name.) name. He was the leader of a group of bandits during the reign of King Yeonsangun of Joseon, and is briefly mentioned in the Veritable Records of the Joseon Dynasty.

While much of his life remains unknown, most Korean historians agree that his rebellion in Chungcheong Province became the inspiration behind the popular Korean novel.

== Biography ==
Hong Kiltong was born in the village of Ach'isil (아치실) in Agok-ri, Jangseong County, in Jeolla Province, around 1440. (Note: The Mansŏngdaedongbo notes 1440 as Hong Kiltong's exact date of birth. However, the reliability of the Mansŏngdaedongbo has been challenged, as it is a modern compilation containing several genealogical errors.) According to genealogy records, his father was Hong Sangjik (홍상직; 洪尙直), who served as a high-level official (당상관; 堂上官) in the Joseon royal court. (Note: Due to the existence of multiple namesakes appearing in the Veritable Records, the exact identity of Hong Sangjik remains debated. The Veritable Records appears to note two men who were named "Hong Sangjik" during this period, both of whom served as the Deputy Military Commissioner of Kyŏngsŏng (경성절제사; 鏡城節制使). One first appears on the 24th day, 10th month, 2nd year (1420) entry of the Veritable Records of Sejong, and appears to have died sometime between 1423 and 1425. The other Hong Sangjik became Deputy Military Commissioner during the 1440s, and was later involved in Yi Si-ae's Rebellion. The latter appears more likely to have been the Hong Sangjik who fathered Hong Gildong, as Hong Kiltong himself is recorded to have been born around 1440.) The identity of Hong's mother remains uncertain; historical records suggest two possible women, both of whom were of a lowly class. One is Chun Sŏm (춘섬), a nobi woman who is said to have given birth to Hong in 1440 according to the Mansŏngdaedongbo, a collection of Korean genealogy records compiled in the 1920s. The other is Ok Yŏnghyang (옥영향; 玉英香), a kisaeng who cohabited Hong Sangjik and appears in the 22nd day, 7th month, 26th year (1444) entry of the Veritable Records of Sejong.

Throughout the late 15th century, peasant rebellions rose throughout Joseon as yangban landlords exploited the peasantry, many of whom had become tenant farmers after losing their farmlands. Peasant armies launched insurrections during Yeonsangun's tyrannical reign (1495–1506), attacking yangban households or local offices.

Hong led a major peasant army in Chungcheong Province, where he, dressed as an aristocrat, raided several government offices. Hong was eventually captured in 1500, according to the 22nd day, 10th month, 6th year (1500) entry of the Diary of Yeonsangun. Hong's capture was reported directly to the king by the High State Councillors, who labeled Hong an "outlaw" and rejoiced over the news of his arrest. Hong was subsequently transferred to the Ŭigŭmbu in Hanseong, where he was interrogated. The subsequent investigation into Hong's insurrection revealed that he had conspired with Ŏm Kwison (엄귀손; 嚴貴孫), a high-ranking military officer. Ŏm was later accused of additional charges of corruption and eventually died in prison.

There are no surviving historical records that mention Hong's death, leading historians to speculate that he would have died incarcerated shortly after his capture. Seol Seong-gyeong (설성경) of Yonsei University has suggested the possibility that Hong may have escaped prison and migrated to Okinawa, where he became the renowned Ryukyuan rebel leader Oyake Akahachi. However, this hypothesis has since been dismissed due to the lack of solid evidence.

== Inspiration for Hong Gildong jeon ==
The Hong Gildong jeon, a Korean novel written during the Joseon period, is considered one of the most iconic pieces of Korean literature. The Hong Gildong jeon revolves around the life of Hong Gildong, the illegitimate son of a yangban family who steals the riches of wealthy aristocrats and leads the peasantry using his supernatural abilities.

For a long time, the Hong Gildong jeon and its main protagonist, Hong Gildong, were considered works of pure fiction. Studies suggesting the existence of a real-life Hong Gildong who served as the inspiration for the novel were first published in 1969 by Lee Neung-u (이능우) of Sookmyung Women's University. In 1981, Kim Gi-dong (김기동) of Dongguk University found records of Hong Kiltong in several historical texts, such as the Tales from the Green Hills, finding further evidence suggesting his existence as the historical counterpart to the fictional character. Most historians of Korean history now agree that Hong Kiltong and his rebellion served as the inspiration behind the novel.

The exact authorship of the Hong Gildong jeon remains debated; some historic sources, such as Yi Sik's T'aektangjip (택당집; 澤堂集), cite Joseon novelist and politician Hŏ Kyun as the author, while other historians have questioned the verifiability of these sources. This ambiguity has led some to theorize that the modern-day rendition of the Hong Gildong jeon originates from a factual biography of Hong Kiltong authored by Hŏ.

== In popular culture ==
=== Actors who have played Hong Gil-dong ===
- Portrayed by Kang Ji-hwan and Lee In-sung in the 2008 KBS2 TV series Hong Gil-dong.
- Portrayed by Sungmin and Yesung in the 2010 musical Hong Gil-dong.
- Portrayed by Yoon Kyun-sang in the 2017 MBC TV series The Rebel.
- Portrayed by Han Joo-wan in the 2015 Korean movie The Tale of the Bookworm.
- Portrayed by Ri Yong Ho in the 1986 North Korean movie Hong Kil-dong
