= The Rebel (South Korean TV series) =

2017 Korean television series

- Promotional poster
- Hangul: 역적: 백성을 훔친 도적
- RR: Yeokjeok: baekseongeul humchin dojeok
- MR: Yŏkchŏk: paeksŏngŭl humch'in tojŏk
- Genre: Historical; Melodrama; Romance
- Created by: Lee Ju-hwan
- Written by: Hwang Jin-young
- Directed by: Kim Jin-man
- Starring: Kim Sang-joong; Yoon Kyun-sang; Chae Soo-bin; Kim Ji-suk; Lee Hanee
- Music by: Kim Soo-han
- Country of origin: South Korea
- Original language: Korean
- No. of episodes: 30

Production
- Executive producer: Lee Young-hoon
- Producer: Namkoong Sung-woo
- Production location: South Korea
- Running time: 60 minutes
- Production companies: Hunus Entertainment; Hong Gil-dong SPC

Original release
- Network: MBC TV
- Release: January 30 – May 16, 2017

The Rebel (Korean: 역적: 백성을 훔친 도적; lit. 'Rebel: Thief Who Stole the People') is a South Korean television series starring Kim Sang-joong, Yoon Kyun-sang, Chae Soo-bin, Kim Ji-seok, and Lee Hanee. It aired on MBC TV every Monday and Tuesday at 22:00 (KST) from January 30, 2017 to May 16, 2017.

The series was a success with average viewership ratings of 11.34%, and was praised by both critics and audiences for its plot and performances.

== Synopsis ==
Set during the reign of famous tyrant Yeonsangun, it tells the story of Hong Gil-dong, the son of a slave who stole from the rich and gave to the poor, and his journey in becoming Joseon's first revolutionary.

Hong Gil-dong (Yoon Kyun-sang) is the son of slave Hong Ah-mo-gae, which gives Gil-dong no legal standing in Joseon society. With no opportunities to do any legitimate work despite his brilliance, Gil-dong becomes the leader of a band of smugglers who steals from the rich to give to the poor. Gil-dong's contemporary, Yi Yung, becomes the tyrannical Yeonsangun (Kim Ji-seok) who oppresses the lives of the common people. The King's faithful concubine is Jang Nok-su (Lee Hanee) who secretly can't forget her first love, Gil-dong.

== Cast ==
=== Main ===
- Kim Sang-joong as Hong Ah-mo-gae

Gil-dong's father. A brilliant and ambitious slave who frees himself and later becomes the leader of the Ilkhwari.

- Yoon Kyun-sang as Hong Gil-dong
  - Lee Ro-woon as young Hong Gil-dong
- Chae Soo-bin as Song Ga-ryung

Gil-dong's love interest and later wife.

- Kim Ji-suk as Crown Prince Yi Yung (later Yeonsangun)
- Lee Hanee as Gong-hwa (later renamed to Jang Nok-su)

Yeonsangun's concubine and Gil-dong's first love.

=== Supporting ===
==== Hong Family ====
- Shim Hee-sub as Hong Gil-hyun / Park Ha-sung
  - Lee Do-hyun as young Hong Gil-hyun

Ah-mo-gae's eldest son and Gil-dong's older brother.

- Shin Eun-jung as Geum-ok

Ah-mo-gae's wife and Gil-dong's mother.

- Lee Soo-min as Hong Uh-ri-ni / Sang-hwa
  - Jeong Soo-in as young Hong Uh-ri-ni

Ah-mo-gae's daughter and Gil-dong's younger sister.

==== Ilkhwari ====
- Park Jun-gyu as Hong So-bu-ri
- Lee Jun-hyeok as Hong Yong-gae
- Kim Do-yoon as Hong Se-gul
- Heo Jung-do as Hong Il-chung
- Lee Ho-chul as Hong Kkeut-shwe
- Kim Byung-chun as Soo Noh-man-sub
- Lee Myung-hoon as Hong Eob-san
  - Jo Hyun-do as young Eob-san
- Kim Ha-eun as Jeok Sun-ah

==== Royal Court ====
- Kim Jung-tae as Yi Jung, Prince Chungwon
- Choi Moo-sung as King Seongjong
- Park Soo-young as Kim Ja-won
- Ahn Suk-hwan as Left State Councillor Noh Sa-shin
- Ryu Tae-ho as Yu Ja-gwang
- Choi Yong-min as Yun Pil-sang
- Park Ji-il as Yi Se-jwa
- Choi Dae-chul as Park Won-jong

==== Others ====
- Kim Byeong-ok as Magistrate Uhm Ja-chi

A third-generation deputy magistrate. He later becomes a town magistrate with the help of Ah-mo-gae.

- Hwang Seok-jeong as Wol-ha-mae
- Kim Joon-bae as Heo Tae-hak

A thug and Ah-mo-gae's rival.

- Kim Jung-hyun as Mo-ri

Heo Tae-hak's right-hand man, later a rival of Gil-dong.

- Ahn Nae-sang as Song Do-hwan
- Seo Yi-sook as Lady Jo

Jo Cham-bong's wife.

- Park Eun-seok as Jo Soo-hak
  - Kim Ye-jun as young Jo Soo-hak

Jo Cham-bong's son.

- Song Sam-dong as Lee Uk-gong
- Jung Da-bin as Ok-ran
- Lee Do-gyeom as Do-ho
- Park Ji-a as Jin-soo
- Lee Chung-mi as Han-deok
- Kim Hee-jung as Baek Kyun
- Kang Hui as Yeong-hui
- Cha Geon-woo
- Shim Eun-woo as shaman

=== Special appearances ===
- Son Jong-hak as Jo Cham-bong
- Ko In-bum as Jo Cham-bong's uncle
- Moon Sook

== Production ==
- Actors Namkoong Min and Ji Sung were first offered the lead role.
- The first script reading took place on December 30, 2016 at MBC Broadcasting Station in Sangam.

== Ratings ==
- In the table below, the blue numbers represent the lowest ratings and the red numbers represent the highest ratings.
- NR denotes that the drama did not rank in the top 20 daily programs on that date

Episode #	Date	Average audience share				
Episode #	Date	TNmS Ratings		AGB Nielsen Ratings		
Episode #	Date	Nationwide	Seoul National Capital Area	Nationwide	Seoul National Capital Area	Peak
1	January 30, 2017	8.3% (20th)	8.2% (17th)	8.9% (NR)	9.1% (16th)	11.0%
2	January 31, 2017	8.4% (17th)	9.3% (8th)	10.0% (8th)	10.2% (6th)	12.1%
3	February 6, 2017	9.9% (12th)	11.3% (5th)	10.5% (7th)	10.8% (5th)	13.3%
4	February 7, 2017	11.4% (7th)	12.5% (5th)	12.3% (5th)	12.3% (5th)	14.5%
5	February 13, 2017	9.8% (11th)	11.8% (5th)	10.7% (7th)	10.9% (6th)	12.9%
6	February 14, 2017	9.1% (10th)	10.9% (5th)	10.6% (8th)	11.1% (5th)	12.9%
7	February 20, 2017	9.4% (10th)	11.4% (5th)	11.4% (5th)	11.9% (5th)	13.3%
8	February 21, 2017	9.4% (9th)	10.9% (5th)	11.5% (5th)	12.1% (5th)	14.0%
9	February 27, 2017	10.6% (7th)	11.7% (5th)	11.7% (5th)	12.0% (5th)	14.3%
10	February 28, 2017	11.4% (7th)	11.9% (5th)	12.5% (5th)	13.4% (5th)	15.2%
11	March 6, 2017	8.9% (12th)	10.0% (5th)	10.3% (8th)	10.6% (6th)	12.1%
12	March 7, 2017	9.5% (11th)	10.5% (6th)	10.5% (7th)	10.5% (5th)	12.0%
13	March 13, 2017	9.8% (10th)	10.5% (6th)	10.6% (7th)	10.5% (5th)	12.3%
14	March 14, 2017	9.7% (7th)	10.5% (5th)	10.4% (7th)	10.3% (5th)	11.0%
15	March 20, 2017	9.6% (12th)	10.7% (7th)	9.7% (7th)	9.3% (9th)	10.9%
16	March 21, 2017	8.9% (11th)	9.7% (6th)	8.8% (7th)	8.9% (6th)	10.0%
17	March 27, 2017	11.9% (7th)	12.3% (5th)	13.8% (5th)	14.3% (5th)	15.9%
18	March 28, 2017	12.3% (7th)	13.1% (5th)	13.9% (4th)	14.8% (5th)	16.3%
19	April 3, 2017	11.2% (7th)	11.6% (5th)	12.9% (5th)	13.7% (5th)	15.7%
20	April 4, 2017	12.8% (5th)	14.1% (5th)	12.5% (5th)	12.6% (5th)	15.7%
21	April 10, 2017	11.5% (7th)	12.6% (5th)	12.7% (5th)	13.1% (5th)	15.0%
22	April 11, 2017	12.5% (7th)	13.8% (5th)	13.0% (5th)	13.1% (5th)	15.7%
23	April 17, 2017	13.0% (5th)	14.2% (5th)	13.5% (5th)	14.2% (5th)	16.0%
24	April 18, 2017	13.0% (6th)	14.2% (5th)	13.3% (5th)	14.0% (5th)	15.6%
25	April 24, 2017	11.6% (7th)	12.6% (5th)	12.1% (5th)	12.6% (5th)	14.1%
26	April 25, 2017	11.6% (5th)	12.8% (5th)	12.4% (4th)	12.7% (4th)	14.3%
27	May 1, 2017	12.6% (5th)	14.7% (4th)	13.0% (5th)	13.7% (4th)	15.9%
28	May 8, 2017	13.3% (5th)	15.4% (4th)	12.3% (5th)	12.4% (5th)	15.8%
29	May 15, 2017	11.7% (7th)	12.5% (5th)	12.1% (6th)	12.8% (5th)	13.9%
30	May 16, 2017	13.8% (4th)	15.6% (4th)	14.4% (5th)	15.1% (5th)	17.0%
Average		10.8%	12.0%	11.7%	12.1%	13.9%

- Episode 28 did not air on May 2 due to the broadcast of a presidential debate.
- Episode 29 did not air on May 9 due to news coverage of the presidential election.

== Original soundtrack ==
Songs

The Rebel OST Album

Soundtrack album by Various Artists
- Genre: Soundtrack
- Language: Korean
- Labels: Snow Entertainment; Warner Music
- Producers: Kim Kyu-nam; Seol Gi-tae

=== Part 1 ===
No.	Title	Lyrics	Music	Artist	Length
1.	"If Spring Comes (Original Version)" (봄이 온다면)	Ahn Ye-eun	Ahn Ye-eun	Jeon In-kwon	04:36
2.	"If Spring Comes (Drama Version)" (봄이 온다면)	Ahn Ye-eun	Ahn Ye-eun	Jeon In-kwon	04:31
3.	"If Spring Comes (Instrumental)" (봄이 온다면)		Ahn Ye-eun		04:31
Total length:					13:38

=== Part 2 ===
No.	Title	Lyrics	Music	Artist	Length
1.	"If Spring Comes (Drama Version)" (봄이 온다면)	Ahn Ye-eun	Ahn Ye-eun	Ahn Ye-eun	03:31
2.	"Which Way (Drama Version)" (길이 어데요)	Kim Soo-han	Kim Soo-han; Fara Effect	Lee Ha-nui	02:56
3.	"If Spring Comes (Drama Version) (Instrumental)" (봄이 온다면)		Ahn Ye-eun		03:31
4.	"Which Way (Instrumental)" (길이 어데요)		Kim Soo-han; Fara Effect		02:56
Total length:					12:54

=== Part 3 ===
No.	Title	Lyrics	Music	Artist	Length
1.	"Your Flower" (그대 꽃)	VIP	VIP	U Sung-eun	04:32
2.	"Your Flower (Instrumental)" (그대 꽃)		VIP		04:32
Total length:					09:04

=== Part 4 ===
No.	Title	Lyrics	Music	Artist	Length
1.	"I Wanted To Love" (사랑하고 싶었던 거야)	Shin Jae-hong; Shin Hyung; Rapsta	Shin Jae-hong; Shin Hyung	Minzy	03:26
2.	"I Wanted To Love (Instrumental)" (사랑하고 싶었던 거야)		Shin Jae-hong; Shin Hyung		03:26
Total length:					06:52

=== Part 5 ===
No.	Title	Lyrics	Music	Artist	Length
1.	"Magic Lily" (상사화)	Ahn Ye-eun	Ahn Ye-eun	Ahn Ye-eun	05:26
2.	"Magic Lily (Instrumental)" (상사화)		Ahn Ye-eun		05:26
Total length:					10:52

=== Part 6 ===
No.	Title	Lyrics	Music	Artist	Length
1.	"That's Love" (사랑이라고)	Ahn Ye-eun	Kim Jin-hwan; Ahn Ye-eun	Choi Yoon-a	04:44
2.	"That's Love (Instrumental)" (사랑이라고)		Kim Jin-hwan; Ahn Ye-eun		04:44
Total length:					09:28

=== Part 7 ===
No.	Title	Lyrics	Music	Artist	Length
1.	"Spring Of Ilkhwari" (익화리의 봄)	Ahn Ye-eun	Ahn Ye-eun; Kim Jin-hwan	Kim Sang-joong	04:10
2.	"Spring Of Ilkhwari (Ah Mo Gae narration version)" (익화리의 봄)	Ahn Ye-eun	Ahn Ye-eun; Kim Jin-hwan	Kim Sang-joong	04:10
3.	"Spring Of Ilkhwari (Instrumental)" (익화리의 봄)		Ahn Ye-eun; Kim Jin-hwan		04:10
Total length:					12:30

=== Part 8 ===
No.	Title	Lyrics	Music	Artist	Length
1.	"Nightly Rain" (담담히 적시고나)	Lee Il-woo	Park Min-hee; Kim Soo-han	Jambinai feat. Park Min-hee	04:11
2.	"Nightly Rain (Instrumental)" (담담히 적시고나)		Park Min-hee; Kim Soo-han		04:11
Total length:					08:22

=== Part 9 ===
No.	Title	Lyrics	Music	Artist	Length
1.	"New Day" (새날)	Ahn Ye-eun	Ahn Ye-eun; Haerobwang	Yeon Kyu-sung	05:12
2.	"New Day (Instrumental)" (새날)		Ahn Ye-eun; Haerobwang		05:12
Total length:					10:24

=== Part 10 ===
No.	Title	Lyrics	Music	Artist	Length
1.	"That's Love" (사랑이라고)	Ahn Ye-eun	Kim Jin-hwan; Ahn Ye-eun	Chae Soo-bin	04:44
2.	"That's Love (Instrumental)" (사랑이라고)		Kim Jin-hwan; Ahn Ye-eun		04:44
Total length:					09:28

== Awards and nominations ==
Year	Award	Category	Nominated Person	Result	Ref
2017	10th Korea Drama Awards	Grand Prize (Daesang)	Kim Sang-joong	Won	
2017	10th Korea Drama Awards	Best Drama	The Rebel	Nominated	
2017	10th Korea Drama Awards	Best Production Director	Kim Jin-man	Nominated	
2017	10th Korea Drama Awards	Best Screenplay	Hwang Jin-young	Nominated	
2017	10th Korea Drama Awards	Top Excellence Award, Actor	Kim Ji-seok	Won	
2017	10th Korea Drama Awards	Top Excellence Award, Actress	Lee Hanee	Won	
2017	10th Korea Drama Awards	Excellence Award, Actor	Yoon Kyun-sang	Nominated	
2017	1st The Seoul Awards	Best Drama	The Rebel	Nominated	
2017	1st The Seoul Awards	Best Actor	Yoon Kyun-sang	Nominated	
2017	1st The Seoul Awards	Best Supporting Actor	Kim Ji-seok	Nominated	
2017	1st The Seoul Awards	Best Supporting Actress	Lee Ha-nui	Won	
2017	ABU Prizes	Commended Prize	The Rebel	Won	
2017	Asian Television Awards	Best Drama Series	The Rebel	Nominated	
2017	36th MBC Drama Awards	Grand Prize (Daesang)	Kim Sang-joong	Won	
2017	36th MBC Drama Awards	Drama of the Year	The Rebel	Won	
2017	36th MBC Drama Awards	Writer of the Year	Hwang Jin-young	Won	
2017	36th MBC Drama Awards	Top Excellence Award, Actor in a Monday-Tuesday Drama	Kim Sang-joong	Nominated	
2017	36th MBC Drama Awards	Top Excellence Award, Actor in a Monday-Tuesday Drama	Yoon Kyun-sang	Nominated	
2017	36th MBC Drama Awards	Top Excellence Award, Actress in a Monday-Tuesday Drama	Lee Hanee	Won	
2017	36th MBC Drama Awards	Excellence Award, Actress in a Monday-Tuesday Drama	Chae Soo-bin	Won	
2017	36th MBC Drama Awards	Golden Acting Award, Actor in a Monday-Tuesday Drama	Kim Byeong-ok	Nominated	
2017	36th MBC Drama Awards	Golden Acting Award, Actress in a Monday-Tuesday Drama	Seo Yi-sook	Won	
2017	36th MBC Drama Awards	Popularity Award, Actor	Yoon Kyun-sang	Nominated	
2017	36th MBC Drama Awards	Popularity Award, Actress	Lee Hanee	Nominated	
2017	36th MBC Drama Awards	Best New Actor	Kim Jung-hyun	Won	
2017	36th MBC Drama Awards	Best New Actor	Shim Hee-seop	Nominated	
2017	36th MBC Drama Awards	Best New Actress	Lee Soo-min	Nominated	
2017	36th MBC Drama Awards	Best Young Actor	Lee Ro-woon	Won	
2017	36th MBC Drama Awards	Best Young Actor	Jung Soo-in	Nominated	
2017	36th MBC Drama Awards	Best Character Award, Fighting Spirit Acting	Kim Sang-joong	Nominated	
2018	54th Baeksang Arts Awards	Best Actor	Kim Sang-joong	Nominated	
