= Father, I'll Take Care of You =

2016 South Korean TV series

- Directed by: Lee Dae-young
- Starring: Kim Jaewon; Lee Soo-kyung; Park Eun-bin; Lee Tae-hwan
- Country of origin: South Korea
- Original language: Korean
- No. of episodes: 50

Production
- Executive producer: Park Sung-eun
- Producers: Ahn Jae-hyun; Shin Sang-yoon; Oh Sung-min
- Production location: Korea
- Running time: 70 minutes
- Production companies: Samhwa Networks; GnG Productions

Original release
- Network: MBC TV
- Release: November 12, 2016 – May 7, 2017

Father, I'll Take Care of You (Korean: 아버님 제가 모실게요; RR: Abeonim jega mosilgeyo) is a 2016 South Korean television series starring Kim Jaewon, Park Eun-bin, Lee Tae-hwan, Lee Soo-kyung and others. It replaced The Flower in Prison and started airing on MBC TV on November 12, 2016 for 50 episodes.

== Synopsis ==
After their four children become independent, an old couple (Hyung-sub and Jeong-ae) decide to live for themselves. But one day, their four children come back to them. The story in addition to depicting the relationship between the family members also focusses on the revenge planned by a new neighbour (Lee Hyun-woo) against Hyung-sub.

Director Lee Dae-young said of the series, "It will depict the confrontation between generations and siblings caused by the grown-up children cohabiting with their parents and the story of a family that overcomes those troubles with love and affection", including a romance of the younger characters. He added that the drama portrays current South Korean society where rising housing costs have encouraged young married couples to live with their parents.

== Cast ==
=== Main cast ===
- Kim Jaewon as Lee Hyun-woo
- Park Eun-bin as Oh Dong-hee/Bang Hyun-jeong
- Lee Soo-kyung as Han Jeong-eun
- Lee Tae-hwan as Han Sung-jun/Lee Seong-woo

=== Han's Family ===
- Kim Chang-wan as Han Hyung-sub
- Kim Hye-ok as Moon Jeong-ae
- Na Moon-hee as Hwang Mi-ok
- Lee Seung-joon as Han Seong-hoon
- Hwang Dong-joo as Han Seong-sik
- Kim Sun-young as Seo Hye-joo
- Shin Dong-mi as Kang Hee-sook
- Son Bo-seung as Han Chang-soo
- Lee Ye-won as Han Ah-in
- Yoon Mi-ra as Han Ae-ri
- Kim Yong-rim as Oh Gui-boon
- Seo Dong-woon as Seo Chul-min
- Ko Seong-hyun as Ryu Myung-jin
- Oh Yeon-ah as Han Jeong-hwa
- Ahn Jeong-hoon as Kang Min-seok

=== Broadcasting Company Staff ===
- Lee Seul-bi as Bang Mi-joo
- Park Jin-soo as PD Kim

=== People Around Lee Hyun-woo ===
- Jo Sun-mook as Jo Moo-gyum

=== Others ===
- Go In-beom as Bang Gwang-jin

== Ratings ==
In the table below, the blue numbers represent the lowest ratings and the red numbers represent the highest ratings.

Episode #	Original broadcast date	Average audience share			
Episode #	Original broadcast date	TNmS Ratings		AGB Nielsen	
Episode #	Original broadcast date	Nationwide	Seoul National Capital Area	Nationwide	Seoul National Capital Area
1	2016/11/12	9.3% (5th)	9.7% (5th)	9.7% (5th)	10.5% (5th)
2	2016/11/13	10.2% (8th)	10.8% (6th)	10.2% (9th)	11.2% (7th)
3	2016/11/19	9.3% (8th)		9.4% (7th)	10.3% (6th)
4	2016/11/20	12.5% (3rd)	12.9% (5th)	11.4% (7th)	11.6% (7th)
5	2016/11/26	9.4% (7th)	8.5% (7th)	9.5% (8th)	10.0% (9th)
6	2016/11/27	12.4% (6th)	12.2% (6th)	11.3% (8th)	11.2% (9th)
7	2016/12/03	7.9% (11th)	8.3% (9th)	8.8% (8th)	9.5% (8th)
8	2016/12/04	12.4% (6th)	13.3% (5th)	12.3% (7th)	13.9% (5th)
9	2016/12/10	8.7% (11th)	8.6% (9th)	10.1% (6th)	11.2% (7th)
10	2016/12/11	12.9% (5th)	13.7% (6th)	12.4% (7th)	13.4% (7th)
11	2016/12/17	8.7% (11th)	8.3% (9th)	9.5% (9th)	11.0% (7th)
12	2016/12/18	12.9% (4th)	15.0% (4th)	12.2% (6th)	13.6% (6th)
13	2016/12/24	9.3% (9th)	10.2% (7th)	9.2% (11th)	10.6% (6th)
14	2016/12/25	13.7% (5th)	14.9% (4th)	14.4% (4th)	16.2% (2nd)
15	2017/01/01	13.4% (5th)	15.2% (5th)	14.0% (5th)	15.7% (4th)
16	2017/01/07	11.4% (5th)	12.9% (6th)	10.9% (6th)	11.4% (6th)
17	2017/01/08	12.8% (6th)	14.2% (4th)	13.6% (5th)	14.6% (5th)
18	2017/01/14	11.1% (6th)	12.3% (5th)	11.7% (6th)	12.6% (6th)
19	2017/01/15	12.6% (6th)	13.1% (7th)	13.6% (5th)	15.1% (5th)
20	2017/01/21	10.8% (6th)	12.6% (5th)	10.6% (5th)	11.6% (6th)
21	2017/01/22	13.2% (5th)	14.0% (5th)	13.2% (6th)	14.2% (5th)
22	2017/01/28	10.5% (4th)	10.4% (4th)	10.2% (5th)	10.3% (5th)
23	2017/01/29	11.4% (6th)	11.5% (6th)	12.4% (6th)	13.2% (5th)
24	2017/02/04	11.2% (4th)	12.1% (5th)	11.4% (6th)	12.7% (5th)
25	2017/02/05	12.7% (5th)	14.1% (4th)	13.9% (5th)	14.9% (5th)
26	2017/02/11	10.5% (5th)	10.7% (4th)	11.3% (4th)	12.5% (4th)
27	2017/02/12	12.9% (4th)	13.7% (4th)	14.6% (4th)	15.6% (4th)
28	2017/02/18	11.0% (5th)	11.1% (4th)	12.0% (4th)	13.4% (4th)
29	2017/02/19	13.0% (3rd)	13.5% (4th)	13.7% (5th)	14.4% (5th)
30	2017/02/25	9.9% (5th)	10.5% (4th)	11.5% (4th)	13.2% (4th)
31	2017/02/26	12.0% (3rd)	12.1% (4th)	13.1% (5th)	14.2% (5th)
32	2017/03/04	9.8% (6th)	9.6% (6th)	11.3% (5th)	12.5% (4th)
33	2017/03/05	11.5% (4th)	11.3% (5th)	13.3% (5th)	13.3% (5th)
34	2017/03/11	9.2% (6th)	9.2% (7th)	10.7% (5th)	12.2% (5th)
35	2017/03/12	11.4% (3rd)	11.1% (5th)	13.2% (4th)	13.8% (4th)
36	2017/03/18	11.8% (4th)	11.6% (5th)	13.6% (4th)	14.6% (4th)
37	2017/03/19	14.1% (2nd)	14.7% (3rd)	16.1% (3rd)	16.8% (3rd)
38	2017/03/25	9.8% (6th)	9.2% (7th)	12.1% (4th)	13.2% (4th)
39	2017/03/26	13.0% (4th)	13.4% (6th)	14.7% (4th)	15.1% (4th)
40	2017/04/01	10.1% (7th)	9.7% (7th)	11.4% (4th)	12.2% (4th)
41	2017/04/02	14.4% (2nd)	14.8% (3rd)	14.7% (3rd)	15.4% (3rd)
42	2017/04/08	10.7% (4th)	11.1% (4th)	11.2% (4th)	11.9% (4th)
43	2017/04/09	13.6% (2nd)	14.7% (3rd)	14.0% (4th)	14.6% (4th)
44	2017/04/15	12.9% (2nd)	12.2% (3rd)	13.7% (2nd)	13.8% (2nd)
45	2017/04/16	14.0% (3rd)	14.8% (4th)	13.7% (3rd)	
46	2017/04/22	12.7% (2nd)		13.2% (2nd)	13.7% (2nd)
47	2017/04/29	9.8% (5th)	10.0% (5th)	10.1% (4th)	10.7% (4th)
48	2017/04/30	11.6% (6th)	12.0% (4th)	11.7% (5th)	12.2% (4th)
49	2017/05/06	10.1% (7th)	10.3% (5th)	11.1% (5th)	11.6% (5th)
50	2017/05/07	11.7% (6th)	12.1% (5th)	13.1% (5th)	13.9% (4th)
Average		11.5%	11.9%	12.1%	13.0%
