= Sohyang =

Kim So-hyang 김소향
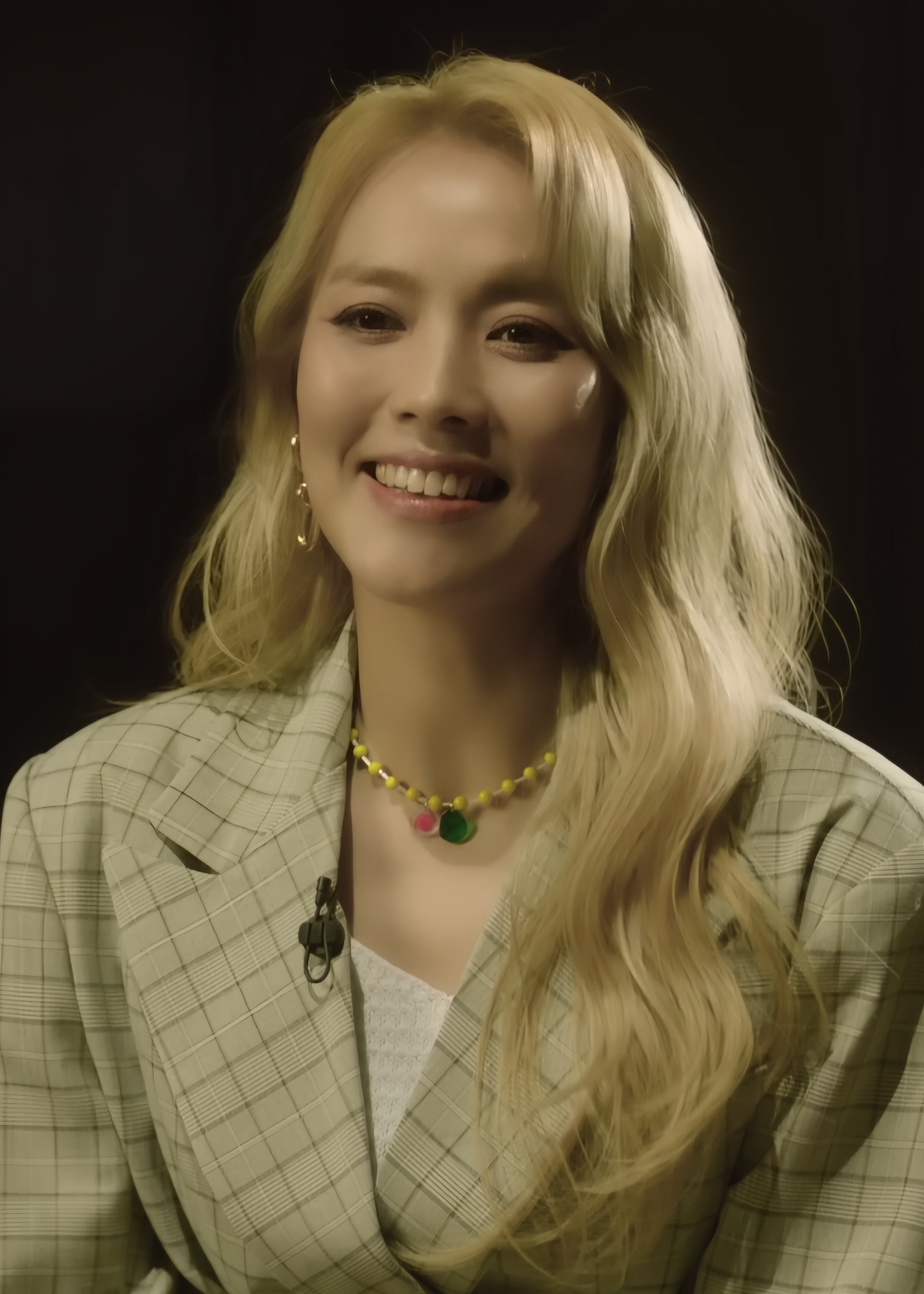
- Sohyang in June 2022

Background information
- Also known as: Sohyang
- Born: Kim So-hyang; April 5, 1978 (age 48); Gwangju, South Jeolla Province, South Korea
- Genres: CCM, gospel, Pop music
- Occupations: Singer, author
- Instruments: Vocals; Guitar; Piano
- Years active: 1996–present
- Label: KQ Entertainment
- Formerly of: POS
- Spouse: Kim Hee-jun (m. 1998; div. 2023)
- Website: cafe.daum.net/sohyang

Kim So-hyang (Korean: 김소향; Hanja: 金昭享, born April 5, 1978), known mononymously as Sohyang, is a South Korean singer-songwriter.

According to Sohyang, her goal is to use her voice to comfort people who are going through difficult times. Sohyang is also an author of fiction, having published multiple fantasy novels since 2013, the most well-known of them being Crystal Castle and Anaxion. She has been dubbed by some journalists in the international media as the "Korean Mariah Carey".

== Career ==
Sohyang made her debut in 1996 with the song "Mr."(선생님). She was practicing in a recording studio and composer Jo Hwan-gon heard her singing and asked her to record a song with him. After being tested by him, Sohyang released her first single and then went on a tour with Jo Hwan-gon and participated in many concerts and musical performances. She joined her husband's family band "POS" and released several Contemporary Christian Music (CCM) albums. Sohyang became one of the most popular and influencing CCM singers of Korea. She held concerts in around 50 countries until now. In 2014, she became the first non-American artist to sing the American national anthem at an NBA game. She achieved further fame when she sang with Kirk Franklin.

Since 2012, Sohyang has participated multiple times on various television music competition programs Immortal Songs 2, King of Mask Singer, and I Am a Singer 2, winning three times on Immortal Songs 2 with songs "Lean on Me", "Bridge over Troubled Water" and in 2023, "One Million Roses". She had also set a record on King of Mask Singer in 2017, before it was broken by Son Seung-Yeon.

After winning the Michael Bolton special episode on Immortal Songs 2 with a score of 442 points (fifth-highest ever), Michael Bolton—who described Sohyang as a "virtuoso"—asked Sohyang to tour South Korea with him, and they performed many concerts together throughout the country. Furthermore, her performance of "Lean on Me" won an award at the 2015 Banff World Media Festival.

In 2016 Sohyang was awarded the Grand Prize of the Seoul Success Award in the Culture category. In Disney's movie Moana, Sohyang provided the singing voice of the protagonist in the Korean-dubbed version. Sohyang also gives lectures about singing and vocal technique at Baekseok University in Cheonan City.

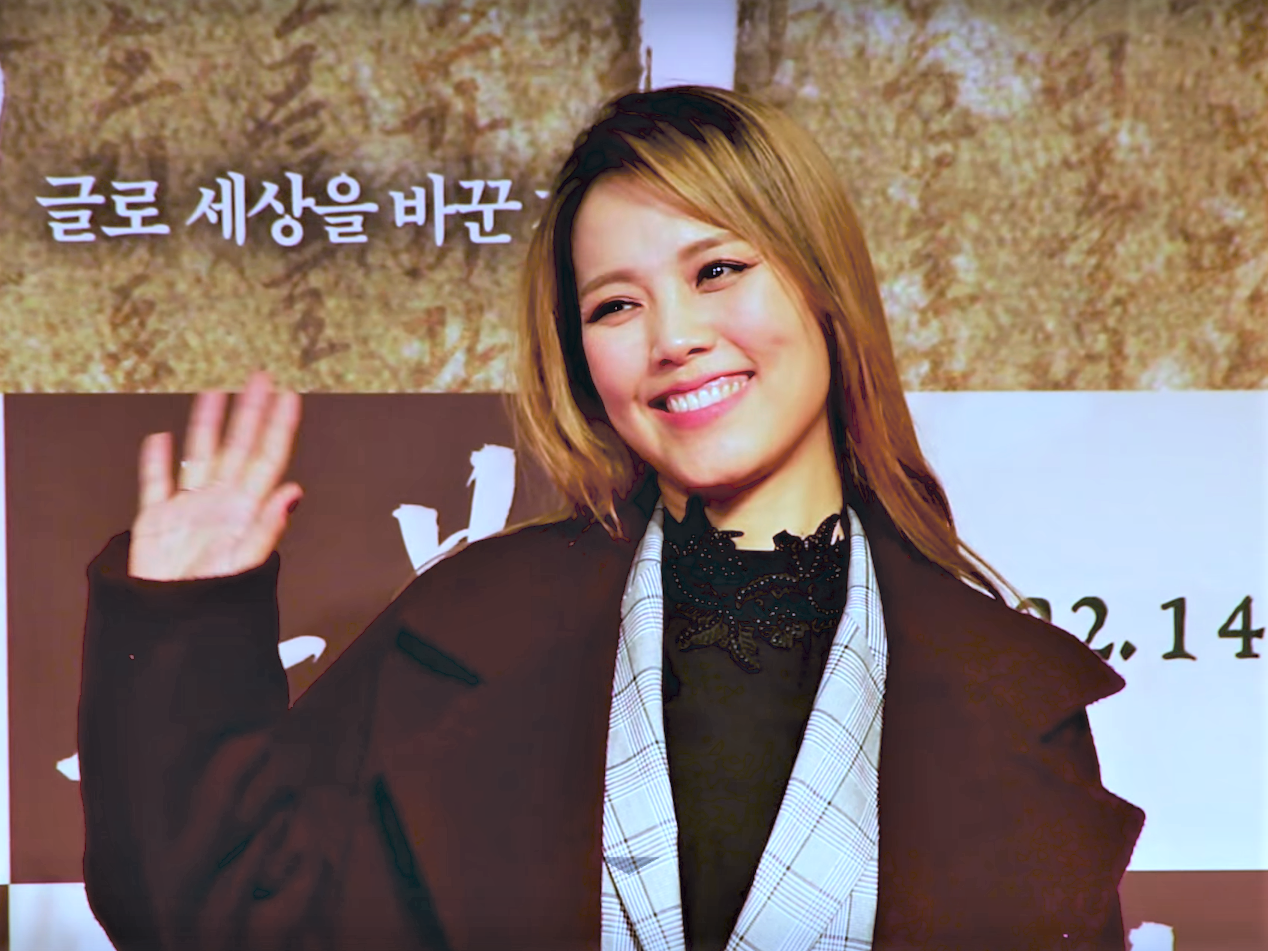
Sohyang in 2018

In the first half of 2017, Sohyang appeared on MBC's King of Mask Singer as "Spirited Lady" for the show's 2nd anniversary and became the winner six consecutive times (Generation 53–58), making her the female singer with the highest number of consecutive wins ever achieved to that time (second highest overall) before losing her crown in July 2017 and departing from the show after appearing for 14 consecutive weeks. Sohyang sang the main OST, "Wind Song" (바람의 노래), which is a remake of Cho Yong-pil's original song, for the Drama Confession Couple (고백부부). This OST was at No. 1 on the charts on Melon (online music service) for several weeks and additionally won the 1st place on Music Bank on November 24, 2017. She was given a special stage on which to perform the main OST "Wind Song" at the KBS Drama Awards on the last day of 2017. Sohyang performed at the MBC Entertainment Awards 2017 and was awarded the Special Prize in the Music Show category for her participation in King of Mask Singer. She became the King of the show with the highest number of consecutive wins ever achieved as a female contestant at that time.

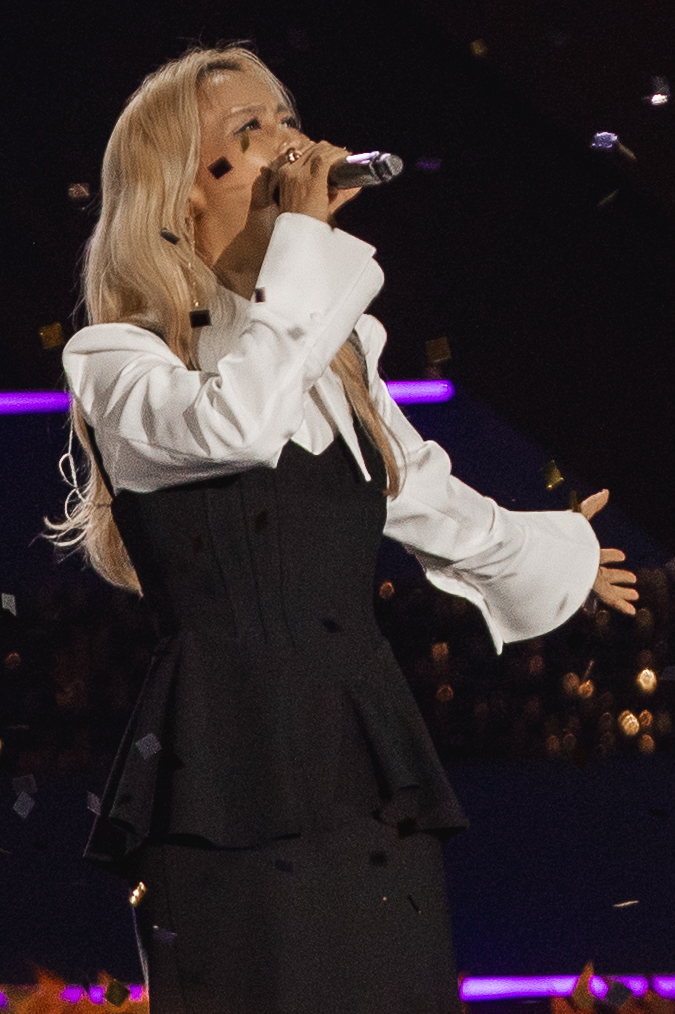
Sohyang performing in Pyeongtaek in 2024

During the 2018 Winter Olympics in Pyeongchang, ice dancer Yura Min and Alexander Gamelin performed to Sohyang's rendition of "Arirang Alone". Furthermore, during the opening ceremony of the 2018 Winter Paralympics in Pyeongchang Sohyang performed, together with Sumi Jo, the song "Here as One", which they both recorded specifically for this occasion.

== Personal life ==
Sohyang is a devout Christian. She first began singing in her local community, with no aspirations of pursuing a career as a professional singer. Sohyang's parents divorced when she was in her third year of high school. Due to this, Sohyang experienced great financial difficulties, and, according to her, was often very sad as a result. She has said that she used to listen to artists Mariah Carey, Whitney Houston, and Celine Dion often, whose music helped her to get through these difficult times. In 2017 she was quoted as having said that her favorite album is still Carey's Music Box.

In 1998, at the age of twenty, Sohyang married Kim Hee-jun, the drummer of her band POS. Soon afterwards she was diagnosed with uterine cancer; due to the early detection, she was able to survive the cancer, but was rendered infertile. Her sister-in-law is the guitarist JinJoo Lee from DNCE. In September 2025, KQ Entertainment confirmed that Sohyang and Kim divorced two years ago on amicable terms.

== Discography ==
=== Studio albums ===
Title	Album details
As member of POS
POS	Released: September 25, 2000
Letter To The Sky	Released: September 19, 2001; Label: Kakao Entertainment
Butterfly	Released: September 8, 2004; Label: June Music
Dream	Released: September 12, 2007; Label: Maninae Media
Story	Released: February 3, 2009; Label: CCM Sky
As solo artist
15th Anniversary	Released: November 5, 2012; Label: June Music
Diva	Released: November 13, 2024; Label: Arche Entertainment

=== Singles ===
==== As lead artist ====
Title	Year	Peak chart positions	Album
Title	Year	KOR	Album
"Love You, I Love You" (사랑한다 널 사랑한다) (featuring Haha)	2012	96	Non-album singles
"Someday" (하늘을 날다)	2013	— (Note: "Someday" did not enter the Circle Digital Chart, but it peaked at number 92 on the component Download Chart.)	Non-album singles
"Rhapsody of Sorrow" (비의 랩소디)	2014	81	Non-album singles
"Fall in All In" (어떻게 내게) (featuring YDG and Dok2)	2014	—	Non-album singles
"Going Home" (집으로 가는 길)	2016	—	Non-album singles
"The Song Begins" (너의 노래) (featuring JinJoo Lee)	2018	—	Non-album singles
"Stay"	2020	—	Non-album singles
"My Soul Magnifies the Lord" (그가 내게) (featuring Heritage)	2020	—	Non-album singles
"Letter" (편지)	2022	— (Note: "Letter" did not enter the Circle Digital Chart, but it peaked at number 81 on the component Download Chart.)	Non-album singles
"Higher"	2023	—	Diva
"Blessing" (featuring YDG)	2024	—	Diva
"Surrender"	2024	— (Note: "Surrender" did not enter the Circle Digital Chart, but it peaked at number 138 on the component Download Chart.)	Diva

==== Collaborations ====
Title	Year	Peak chart positions	Album
Title	Year	KOR	Album
"Mermaid" (인어공주) (R&B Version) (with Lena Park and Lee Young-hyun)	2011	33	Diva Project
"Beside You" (곁) (with Lee Young-hyun)	2014	81	Non-album single
"On My Way Back" (회로) (with ALi)	2020	—	O Esca Viatorum
"Wind of Peace" (평화의 바람) (with Park Wan-kyu)	2021	—	Non-album single
"Lying" (사랑하는 척) (with Vibe)	2022	130	Lying (REVIBE, Vol. 7)
"Miracle" (기적) (with Min Woo-hyuk)	2022	—	Non-album singles
"Freedom" (with Petra)	2022	—	Non-album singles
"The Star" (with Petra)	2022	—	Non-album singles
"My Lord, Jesus" (with Petra)	2023	—	Non-album singles

=== Soundtrack appearances ===
Title	Year	Peak chart positions	Album
Title	Year	KOR	Album
"Only One Thing" (오직 단하나)	2012	50	The King's Doctor OST
"Don't Forget Me" (잊지말아요)	2013	34	Iris II: New Generation OST
"Home"	2017	—	Strongest Deliveryman OST
"Wind Song" (바람의 노래)	2017	51	Confession Couple OST
"Close My Eyes" (눈을 감아)	2018	—	The Time OST
"I Love You" (사랑합니다)	2018	—	My Only One OST
"Only My Heart Knows" (가슴만 알죠)	2018	—	The Hymn of Death OST
"Last Promise" (마지막 약속)	2018	—	A Pledge to God OST
"Starlight"	2019	—	Perfume OST
"Road" (길)	2019	—	Beautiful Love, Wonderful Life OST
"Hopefully Sky" (하늘바라기)	2020	—	Hi Bye, Mama! OST
"Once"	2020	—	When I Was the Most Beautiful OST
"Hello"	2020	—	18 Again OST
"Beautiful Destiny"	2020	—	Birthcare Center OST
"Did You Forget?" (잊었니)	2020	198	Homemade Love Story OST
"Beautiful Words" (아름다운 말)	2021	— (Note: "Beautiful Words" did not enter the Circle Digital Chart, but it peaked at number 95 on the component Download Chart.)	Navillera OST
"I Hope So" (바래)	2022	— (Note: "I Hope So" did not enter the Circle Digital Chart, but it peaked at number 74 on the component Download Chart.)	It's Beautiful Now OST
"Sweet Dreams, My Dear" (Korean and English versions)	2022	— (Note: "Sweet Dreams, My Dear" did not enter the Circle Digital Chart, but the Korean and English versions peaked at numbers 18 and 14, respectively, on the component Download Chart.)	Lost Ark OST
"Vincent"	2022	— (Note: "Vincent" did not enter the Circle Digital Chart, but it peaked at number 36 on the component Download Chart.)	Why Her OST
"Luminous" (눈이 부시게)	2022	— (Note: "Luminous" did not enter the Circle Digital Chart, but it peaked at number 81 on the component Download Chart.)	Poong, the Joseon Psychiatrist OST
"Hello"	2023	— (Note: "Hello" did not enter the Circle Digital Chart, but it peaked at number 34 on the component Download Chart.)	Three Siblings Bravely OST
"Prayer"	2023	—	Brain Cooperation OST
"Beneath The Moonlight" (월하)	2024	— (Note: "Beneath The Moonlight" did not enter the Circle Digital Chart, but it peaked at number 97 on the component Download Chart.)	Love Song For Illusion OST
"That Day" (그 날)	2025	—	The Queen Who Crowns OST

=== Other charted songs ===
Title	Year	Peak chart positions	Album
Title	Year	KOR	Album
"I Have Nothing"	2012	27	I Am a Singer 2: Group B July Competition (7월 B조 경연)
"Running in the Sky" (하늘을 달리다)	2012	42	I Am a Singer 2: Group A August Competition (8월 A조 경연)
"Never Ending Story"	2012	23	I Am a Singer 2: August Singer Exhibition (8월의 가수전)
"Dream" (꿈)	2012	90	I Am a Singer 2: 2012 King of Kings Opening Ceremony (2012 가왕전 개막제)
"Where Are You?" (그대는 어디에)	2012	67	I Am a Singer 2: 2012 King of Kings Round 7 (2012 가왕전 7강전)
"Saldaga" (살다가)	2012	33	I Am a Singer 2: 2012 King of Kings Round 6 (2012 가왕전 6강전)
"For a Thousand Days" (천일동안) (with The One)	2012	31	I Am a Singer 2: 2012 King of Kings Round 4 (2012 가왕전 4강전)
"Fate" (인연)	2012	17	I Am a Singer 2: 2012 King of Kings Round 4 (2012 가왕전 4강전)

== Filmography ==
=== Variety shows ===
Year	Title	Notes
2000 - 2024	KBS Open Concert	Guest Performer
2012	I Am a Singer 2	Contestant, 3rd place
2014-2024	Immortal Songs 2	Contestant, 10 Episodes, 4 Wins
2017	King of Mask Singer	Spirited Lady, Episodes 105–118, 6 wins
2020	Begin Again	Cast member, Season 4, Episode 6–10
2021	Voice King	Judge, Season 1

=== I Am a Singer 2 ===
Month	Round	Song	Original Artist	Result
July	Group B	"I Have Nothing"	Whitney Houston	Rank 1
July	Singer of July	"In the Flower Garden" (꽃밭에서)	Jung Hoon Hee	Rank 3
August	Group A	"Running to the Sky" (하늘을 달리다)	Lee Juck	Rank 1
August	Singer of August	"Never Ending Story"	Boohwal	**Rank 1, Singer of August**
September	Singer of September	"Beauty and the Beast" (duet with Park Wan-kyu)	Céline Dion	Special Stage
Super December	Opening	"Dream" (꿈)	Sohyang – POS	Rank 2
Super December	Week 1	"Where Are You" (그대는 어디에)	Yim Jae-beom	Rank 2
Super December	Week 2	"As I Live" (살다가)	SG Wannabe	Rank 2
Super December	Week 3	"I Always Miss You" (나 항상 그대를)	Lee Sun-hee	Rank 3
Super December	Week 4	"For Thousands Days" (천일동안) (duet with The One)	Lee Seung-hwan	Rank 2
Super December	Week 4	"Fate" (인연)	Lee Sun-hee	Rank 1
Super December	Semi-finals	"O Holy Night"	Adolphe Charles Adam	Rank 2
Super December	Semi-finals	"It's Only My World" (그것만이 내 세상)	Deulgukhwa	3rd place / Drop out

Sohyang achieved the highest average rank of every contestant on I Am a Singer 2 ever. Furthermore, she never placed outside of the Top 3 during the whole time she was present in the show.

==== Records and statistics ====
Rank 1	Rank 2	Rank 3	Average Rank
4 Times	5 Times	3 Times	1,9 (highest ever)

=== Immortal Songs 2 ===
(If the number of rounds won is written in bold, this means that she won the most rounds in that episode.)

Date	Episode Title	Episode No.	Song	Original Artist	Order	Result
October 18, 2014	Michael Bolton Special	Ep. 169	"Lean on Me"	Bill Withers	7/7	442 Votes, 1 Round won, **Final Win**
February 21, 2015	Traditional Folk Songs Special	Ep. 187	"Arirang Alone" (홀로 아리랑)	Jang Sa-ik	1/7	411 Votes, 1 Round won
May 9, 2015	English Pop Songs Special	Ep. 198	"Bridge Over Troubled Water"	Simon and Garfunkel	4/7	416 Votes, **4 Rounds won**, **Final Win**
December 26, 2015	The Immortal Big Match Special	Ep. 230	"Everyone" (여러분)	Yoon Bok Hee	4/7	0 Rounds won
July 23, 2016	Summer Story With Friends Special	Ep. 261	"Childish Adult" (어른 아이) (duet with JK Kim Dong-wook)	Gummy	1/7	0 Rounds won
May 12, 2018	Shane Filan Special	Ep. 354	"You Raise Me Up"	Secret Garden	3/6	414 Votes, **2 Rounds won**
February 26, 2022	Jang Sa-ik Special	Ep. 545	"Wind Song" (바람에 노래)	Cho Yong Pil	Special performance	Special performance
February 26, 2022	Jang Sa-ik Special	Ep. 545	"I Will Give You Everything" (나 그대에게 모두 드리리) (duet with Jang Sa-ik)	Lee Janghee	Special performance	Special performance
April 30, 2022	Korean Music History Special	Ep. 553	"Wild Flower" (야생화) (duet with Min Woo-hyuk)	Park Hyo Shin	1/5	**3 Rounds won**
April 1, 2023	Sim Soo-bong Special	Ep. 600	One Million Roses (백만송이 장미)	Sim Soo-bong	5/5	1 Round won, **Final Win**
July 15, 2023	King of Kings Special	Ep. 615	Part of Your World	Jodi Benson	3/4	0 Rounds won
December 28, 2024	Oh My Star #5 Special	Ep. 687	O Holy Night & All I Want For Christmas Is You (duet with Ahn Shin-ae)	John Sullivan Dwight (Note: The original song with lyrics in French was composed by Adolphe Adam, he composed the song to the lyrics in English.) & Mariah Carey	5/5	1 Round won, **Final Win**
July 5th, 2025	King of Kings Special	Ep. 713	Gangsta's Paradise	Coolio	4/5	427 Votes, **1 Round won**

=== King of Mask Singer ===
Generation #	Episode #	Round #	Song	Original Artist	Opponent	Result (Score)	Notes
53	106	1	"I Miss You" (보고 싶다)	Kim Bum-soo	Minzy	**Win** (**58**:41)	Advanced to the second round
53	106	2	"Atlantis Princess" (아틀란티스 소녀)	BoA	Lee Sang-woo	**Win** (**60**:39)	Advanced to the third round
53	106	3	"Dear Love" (사랑아)	The One	Bae In-hyuk (Romantic Punch)	**Win** (**74**:25)	Advanced to the final round
53	106	Final	Voting based on the first three songs	N/A	Lee Hae-ri of Davichi	**Win** (**58**:41)	**Mask Queen 1st time**
54	108	Final	"Do You Know" (아시나요)	Jo Sung-mo	Park Seon-joo	**Win** (**66**:33)	**Mask Queen 2nd time**
55	110	Final	"Hug Me" (안아줘)	Jung Joon-il	Lee Se-jun (Yurisangja)	**Win** (**77**:22)	**Mask Queen 3rd time**
56	112	Final	"Mona Lisa" (모나리자)	Cho Yong-pil	Hwang Chi-yeul	**Win** (**67**:32)	**Mask Queen 4th time**
57	115	Final	"Breathe" (한숨)	Lee Hi	Park Hye-na	**Win** (**76**:23)	**Mask Queen 5th time**
58	117	Final	"Home"	Park Hyo-shin	John Park	**Win** (**74**:25)	**Mask Queen 6th time**
59	119	Final	"Day Day"	Bewhy	Johan Kim	**Lose** (43:**56**)	Drop out

==== Records and statistics ====
Most Wins (Females)	Most Wins	Average Score
2nd rank	3rd rank	66 of 99 Votes
former 1st rank	former 2nd rank	66 of 99 Votes

Sohyang was the first female singer to ever achieve 6 consecutive victories at that time and therefore set a new record, which was later broken by Son Seung-yeon ("The East Invincibility"). Sohyang received an average of 65.96 votes out of 99 every round, which was ranked in Top 10 of highest average scores of all Mask Kings and Top 3 highest average score of all female Mask Kings for a period of time.

=== Begin Again - Season 4 "Begin Again Korea" ===
In 2020, Sohyang was a cast member of Begin Again Korea for a total of 5 episodes (Ep. 6 - 10 of Season 4), and sang a total of 20 songs as the lead artist.

Episode	Song name	Featuring Artist	Original Artist
6	"Hey, Hey, Hey"	Lee Suhyun, Lee Hi	Jaurim
6	"I Will Always Love You"		Dolly Parton
6	"Can't Take My Eyes Off You"	Lee Hi	Frankie Valli
6	"I Will Go to You Like the First Snow" ko. 첫눈처럼 너에게 가겠다		Ailee
7	"Wind Song" ko. 바람의 노래		Cho Yong Pil
7	"My Heart Will Go On"	Jung Seung Hwan, Lee Suhyun	Céline Dion
7	"I'll Be There"	Hareem	Jackson 5
7	"Flashlight"	Lee SuHyun	Jessie J
7	"I Won't Give Up"		Jason Mraz
8	"Back In Time" ko. 시간을 거슬러		Lyn
8	"Stuck With U"	Crush	Justin Bieber, Ariana Grande
8	"Please" ko. 제발		Lee So Ra
9	"Never Enough"		Loren Allred
9	"My Favorite Things"	Lee Suhyun	Julie Andrews
9	"Misty"		Erroll Garner
9	"You Are The Reason"	Jung Seung Hwan	Calum Scott
10	"That I Love You" ko. 널 사랑하는 걸		Sohyang
10	"Marvin Gaye"	Henry Lau	Charlie Puth, Meghan Trainor
10	"Day Day"	Begin Again Cast	Bewhy
10	"If I Ain't Got You"		Alicia Keys

== Awards ==
Year	Awards	Category	Nominated work	Result	Ref.
2016	8th Seoul Success Awards	Culture Grand Prize	—N/a	Won	
2017	MBC Entertainment Awards	Special Award in Music Show	King of Mask Singer	Won	
2019	Ten Korean Winners	Singer	Herself	Won	
2020	Korea Day Awards	Special Singer	Herself	Won	
2021	K-Model Awards	Global Artist	Herself	Won	
2022	Person of the Year	Culture & Art	Herself	Won	

=== KBS's Music Bank ===
Year	Date	Song	Album	Ref.
2017	November 24	Wind Song (바람의 노래)	Confession Couple (Original Television Soundtrack), Pt. 2 – Single	
