= Saik =

Saik may be:

- The star Zeta Ophiuchi.

Saik or Sa-ik may be:

- Hong Sa-ik, Korean general in the Imperial Japanese Army during World War II
- Jang Sa-ik, South Korean singer
- Courtesy name of late Joseon dynasty artist Kim Su-cheol

SAIK may be:

- Sandvikens AIK, Swedish sports club involved in bandy and football
- Sillhövda AIK, Swedish football club
- Skellefteå AIK, Swedish hockey club
- Skövde AIK, Swedish football club
