= Choi Seung-hoon =

South Korean child actor (born 2008)

- Born: 1 May 2008 (age 18); Seoul, South Korea
- Occupation: Actor
- Years active: 2014–present
- Height: 171 cm (5 ft 7 1/2 in)
- Musical career
- Genre: K-pop
- Years active: 2022–present

Korean name
- Hangul: 최승훈
- RR: Choe Seunghun
- MR: Ch'oe Sŭnghun

Choi Seung-hoon (Korean: 최승훈, born 1 May 2008) is a South Korean actor.

== Filmography ==
=== Television series ===
Year	Title	Role	Ref.
2014	Mama	Han Geu-roo (child)	
2014	The King's Face	Yi Ji	
2015	Ex-Girlfriends' Club	Kim Soo-jin's nephew, Seong-hyeon	
2015	D-Day	Seong Dong-ha	
2015	The Merchant: Gaekju 2015		
2016	Jang Yeong-sil	Yi Hyang (young)	
2016	Madame Antoine: The Love Therapist	Choi Soo-hyun (young)	
2016	The K2	Kim Je-ha (young)	
2016	Golden Pouch	Han Seok-hoon (young)	
2016	First Love Again	Ga-on	
2017	Voice	Son Ah-ram (episodes 2–3)	
2017	Saimdang, Memoir of Colors	Min Ji-seong	
2017	Strong Girl Bong-soon	Ahn Min-hyuk (young)	
2017	Tunnel	Mok Jin-woo (child)	
2017	Hit the Top	Shin Hwa	
2017	Sisters-in-Law		
2017	Live Up to Your Name	Yoo Jae Han (young)	
2017	Hospital Ship	Kim Jae-geol (young)	
2017	Black	Han Moo-gang (young)	
2017	A Korean Odyssey	Lee Soo-cheol	
2018	Radio Romance	Ji Soo-ho (child)	
2018	Marry Me Now	Jung Eun-tae (young)	
2018	Switch	Sa Do-chan (young)	
2018	Hide and Seek	Cha Eun-hyuk (young)	
2018	Devilish Charm	Gong Ma-seong (young)	
2018	The Guest	Yoon Hwa-pyung (young)	
2018	Ms. Ma, Nemesis	Choi Woo-joon	
2018	Fates & Furies	Tae In-joon (young)	
2019	Liver or Die	Lee Jin-sang (young)	
2019	Legal High	Go Tae-rim (young)	
2019	A Place in the Sun	Oh Tae-yang / Kim Yoo-wol (young) / Choi/Kim Ji-min	
2019	Perfume	Seo Yi-do (child)	
2019	Flower Crew: Joseon Marriage Agency	Ma Hoon (young)	
2019	Love with Flaws	Lee Min-hyuk (young)	
2019	KBS Drama Special: Hidden	Kim Geon (young)	
2020	Touch	Cha Jung-hyuk (young)	
2020	Forest	Kang San-hyuk (young)	
2020	My Wonderful Life	Ki Eun-soo	
2021	Hello, Me!	Han Yoo-hyun (young)	
2021	Youth of May	Hwang Jung-tae	
2021	At a Distance, Spring Is Green	Yeo Joon-wan (young)	
2021	Lovers of the Red Sky	Ha Ram (young)	
2021	Melancholia	Baek Seung-yoo (young)	
2021	Amor Fati	Han Ha-neul	
2022	If You Wish Upon Me	Yoon Gyeo-re (young)	
2023	Welcome to Samdal-ri	Cho Yong-pil (young)	
2024	Bad Memory Eraser	Lee Geon (young)	
2025	Study Group	Yoon Ga-min (young)	

=== Web series ===
Year	Title	Role	Ref.
2022	Grid	Kim Sae-ha (young)	
2022	The Sound of Magic	Na Il-deung (young)	
2023	Black Knight	Sa-wol (young)	
2024	Begins ≠ Youth	Kim Joo-an (young)	

=== Film ===
Year	Title	Role	Ref.
2015	Salut d'Amour	Jang-soo (young)	
2016	Pandora	Kang Jae-hyeok (young)	
2018	Champion	Joon-hyung	

=== Television shows ===
Year	Title	Roles	Notes	Ref.
2023	Boys Planet	Contestant	eliminated in first survival round	

== Awards and nominations ==
Year	Award	Category	Nominated work	Result	Ref.
2019	KBS Drama Awards	Best Young Actor	A Place in the Sun	Nominated	
