= The Romantic President =

- Theatrical poster
- Hangul: 피아노 치는 대통령
- Hanja: 피아노 치는 大統領
- RR: Piano chineun daetongnyeong
- MR: P'iano ch'inŭn taet'ongnyŏng
- Directed by: Jeon Man-bae
- Written by: Jeon Man-bae; Kwak Jae-yong
- Produced by: Jeong Su-hyeon
- Starring: Ahn Sung-ki; Choi Ji-woo; Im Soo-jung
- Cinematography: Byun Hee-sung
- Music by: Lee Byung-woo
- Distributed by: CJ Entertainment
- Release date: December 6, 2002
- Running time: 95 minutes
- Country: South Korea
- Language: Korean

The Romantic President (Korean: 피아노 치는 대통령; lit. 'The President who Plays the Piano') is a 2002 South Korean romantic comedy film. It stars Ahn Sung-ki, Choi Ji-woo, Im Soo-jung and was directed by Jeon Man-bae.

== Synopsis ==
The story starts with Young-hee, who was being spoonfed by her attendants as she sat in her father's limousine to school.

A scene showed Choi entering the class, disguised as a new student. Choi sat beside a girl as she acted blatantly and introduced herself as a transfer student. With the girl's help, Choi identified the exceptional students, from the rebel to the most studious student and so on. Choi left the classroom shortly before the class started.

The students ran back to their seats as the principal introduced their new teacher. They were shocked when Choi, who had disguised herself as a transfer student earlier on, was their new teacher.

Young-hee was late for class and high-handedly sat down on a seat without greeting the teacher. Choi reprimanded her for her bad manners, but Young-Hee rebelled and walked out of the classroom. Choi then brought her to the staff room to call for her parents as Young-hee continued to rebel. As Choi called her father, she was shocked that Young-hee's father was the President of South Korea. Choi, being extremely shocked, told the President to call back in twenty five minutes without further ado. Hiccuping as always when she's nervous.

The president later came to visit the school campus. All the students were looking out of the window and waved towards the president who stepped out of the limousine. Hiccup number 2

The president entered the staffroom and searched for Choi. Choi introduced herself, and told the president of his daughter's unruly behavior. As a punishment for not educating his daughter properly, Choi ordered the president to write a romance poem written by a Goguryeo-era king in Hanja a hundred times as homework, which was to be handed up the following day. Choi then ran into the storeroom and tried to pull herself together and fainted.

The president headed for school the next day. Shortly after he had finished his 100th poem, a strong gust of wind blew some of his papers out of his limousine. The president stopped to search for his papers in vain. An officer suggested sending some of his men to find his papers which could have flown into the valley. The president said that he would rewrite the poem, but it was not possible to finish it in such a short time span.

The president called Choi to apologise, but she dismissed it as a lie and told him to tell straight to the point and hung up.

Back at his office, the president searched into Choi's biography and found out that she had only taught for six months at each school, from 1999 onwards.

The next day, the president invited Choi for lunch. Choi appeared rather tensed up as she waited for the president. Lunch was served by the president's henchman as the president arrived.

Just before they ate, the president handed up his work to Choi. Choi marked his work by drawing a whirl and wrote "Excellent Work" on his first page. Choi later confessed that the president made a mistake in one of his words, and a short argument followed as they stated their positions. The president called the Education Minister and confirmed his mistake.

After lunch, the president took a stroll with Choi in his garden. Choi brought up the subject of playing the piano, but that was shortened when Choi also suggested that the president should wear a checkered tie and jeans just before she left.

That night, Choi was taking a bus home when the president came to stalk on her. The bus driver stopped when two of the motorcades rode in front of him, forcing him to stop his bus. The bus driver was shocked when he saw the president boarding the bus. The passengers on the bus were treated to ride on the president's limousines to their designated destinations while Choi and the president would sit on the bus.

The president confessed that his daughter, Young Hee, last smiled when she was six years old, and he wished to see that same smile again. Choi suggested by treating her a surprise party to stand a chance to achieve the result.

One night, the president decided to go for a date with Choi. Several limousines arrived at her hostel as they headed for a bar.

At the bar, Choi asked the president if he had tried moving around without bodyguards. As they were chatting, Shin, Choi's roommate, appeared. Shin was dressed in the army's uniform. The president was surprised to realise that Shin was a girl as she took off her cap. Shin shook the hands of the president enthusiastically, and told him that she would be back in a while in her best clothes. Choi later revealed that Shin was a transsexual.

Both the president and Choi waited for the opportunity to slip off. They ran through the streets and to a musical concert to escape from his bodyguards who were looking for him. They finally came to a tavern to hide and claimed that they were refugees escaping from a few men who were looking for them.

The bodyguards came to the tavern, and ordered the innkeepers to allow them to search for the president. The innkeeper's wife stated that the president visited it thirty years ago and turned away the bodyguards.

As the bodyguards were confronting the innkeeper's wife, the innkeeper directed the president and Choi to hide in an underground compartment. The couple were just about to kiss when the innkeeper opened the compartment. Hiccup 3

The President and Choi later went to her flat, and they kissed there. A reporter took a photo of them which later became a national controversy. The president's popularity vote fell and Choi was frowned upon by her colleagues. A scene showed Young Hee being teased by three classmates as she was smoking a cigarette.

One day, the president and Choi met at the school campus. The president was playing the piano when Choi entered. They talked about the romance poem which Choi had instructed the president to write earlier on. Choi continued that the president was to compose a new poem using his name. The president was suggesting the meanings of the characters of his first two names to Choi. As he was about to talk about the third character of his name, Choi gave a punch on his stomach as he blurted out "WOhhk!".

The show ended with Choi holding the hands of the president as the couple walked into the president's office.

== Cast ==
- Ahn Sung-ki as Han Min-wook
- Choi Ji-woo as Choi Eun-ju
- Im Soo-jung as Young-hee
- Lee Jang-suk as Ha-rin
- Kim Seong-gyeom as Principal
- Lee Jang-soo as Shin Kwang-bae
- Lee Se-mi as Lee Su-jung
- Hwang Gyu-rim
- Park Ji-eun
- Kim Hyeong-il as Head of President's bodyguards
- Kim In-mun as Tavern keeper
- Lee Beom-soo as bum in subway station (cameo)
- Choi Yi-su
