= Choi Hee-jin =

South Korean actress (born 1996)

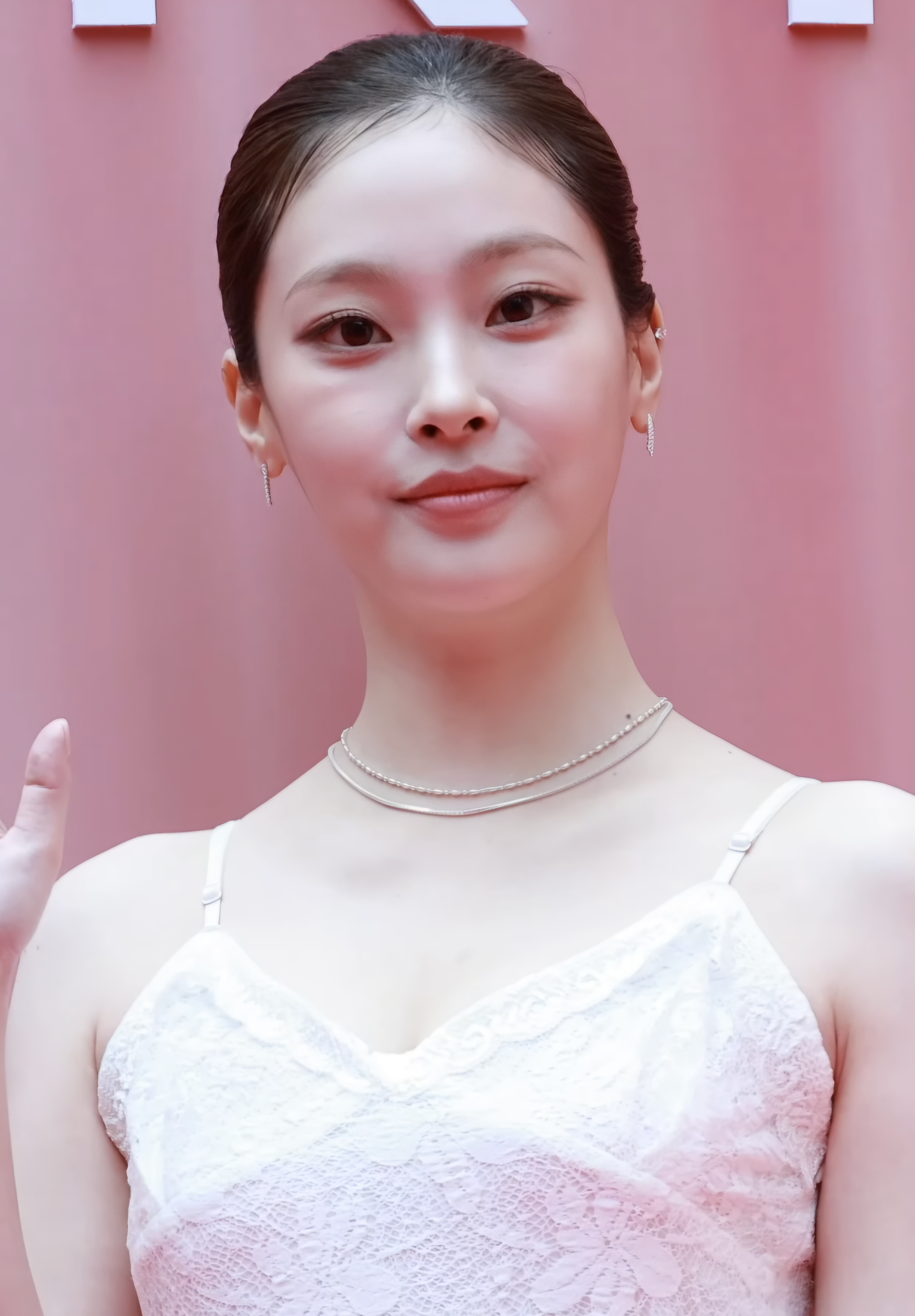
- Choi in May 2025
- Born: November 8, 1996 (age 29); South Korea
- Other name: Choe Hui-jin
- Education: Korea National University of Arts (Graduated from the acting department)
- Occupation: Actress
- Years active: 2017–present
- Agent: Saram Entertainment

Korean name
- Hangul: 최희진
- RR: Choe Huijin
- MR: Ch'oe Hŭijin

Choi Hee-jin (Korean: 최희진; November 8, 1996) is a South Korean actress. She is known for her roles in dramas such as Strong Girl Nam-soon, Behind Your Touch, Hide and Seek, Snowdrop and The Impossible Heir. She also appeared in films including The Whispering, The Girl on a Bulldozer, Good Deal and I Want to Know Your Parents.

== Filmography ==
=== Film ===
Year	Title	Role	Ref.
2018	The Whispering	Jeong-yeon	
2021	Good Deal	Jeong Na-na	
2021	The Girl on a Bulldozer	Kyung-jin	
2022	I Want to Know Your Parents	Prison Guard	
2022	Next Door	Ko Hyeon Min	

=== Television series ===
Year	Title	Role	Notes	Ref.
2018	Lovely Horribly	Hee-jin		
2018	Hide and Seek	Ha Dong-joo		
2021	Snowdrop	Yoon Seol-hui		
2022	Drama Stage: How to Distinguish Voices	Eun Da-hae		
2023	D. P. Season 2	Girl in pink jacket	Bit part	
2023	Behind Your Touch	Kim Si-a		
2023	Strong Girl Nam-soon	Ri Hwa-ja / Lee Myung-hee		
2024	The Impossible Heir	Kang Hee-joo		
2024	KBS Drama Special: "When You Turn the Corner"	Eun-ha		
2025	Motel California	Yoon Nan-woo		
2025	Newtopia	Choi Seul-gi	Cameo (episode 1, 4)	
2025	Heavenly Ever After	Sonya	Episodes 1–2, 4, 11	
2025	I Dol I	Hong Hye-joo		
TBA	No Crushing Allowed	Kim Ri-ji		

=== Web series ===
Year	Title	Role	Ref.
2018	Flower Ever After	Go Min-chae	
2019	The Best Ending	Go Min-chae	
2020	Ending Again	Go Min-chae	
2021	Casting a Spell to You	Lee Shi-won	

=== Music video appearances ===
Year	Song title	Artist	Ref.
2018	"Cheeze"	Mind U	
2019	"Things We Need to Protect After Breaking Up"	Kim Na-young & Yang Da-il	
2020	"Spacedog"	Long D	
2022	"Samseong-dong"	Pateko	
2024	"Welcome to the Show"	Day6	

== Theatre ==
Year	Title	Role	Ref.
2019	Seagull (갈매기)	Nina	
2021	Err, I don't know (에라, 모르겠다)	Choi Dae-ri	
