= Kim Jae-yong =

South Korean actor and singer

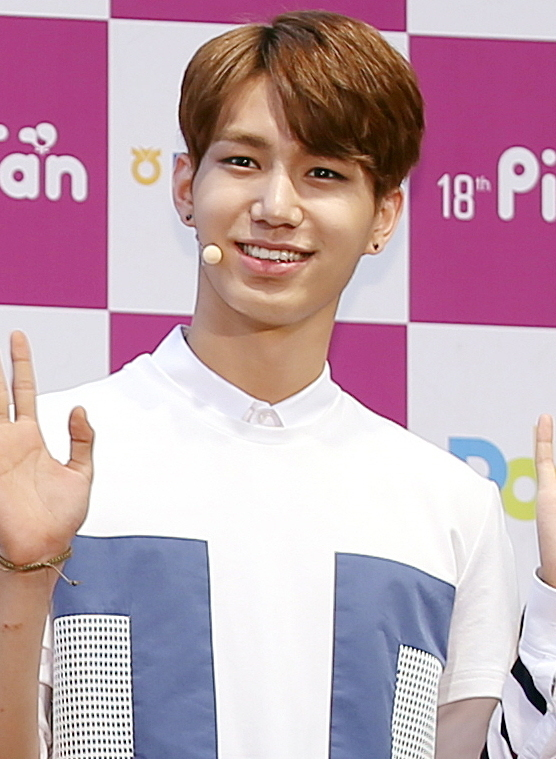
- Kim in 2014
- Born: 13 February 1994 (age 32); Goyang, South Korea
- Occupations: Actor; model; singer
- Years active: 2014–present
- Agent: Triple Entertainment
- Musical career
- Genre: K-pop
- Instrument: Vocals
- Label: Histar Entertainment

Korean name
- Hangul: 김재용
- RR: Gim Jaeyong
- MR: Kim Chaeyong

Kim Jae-yong (born February 13, 1994) is a South Korean actor, singer and model. He is a former member of HALO. He is best known for his supporting roles in The Miracle We Met, Fists of Legend and Love with Flaws as Joo Seo-joon.

== Filmography ==
=== Film ===
Year	Title	Role	Ref.
2013	Fists of Legend	Writer Jae	
2022	Piggy Back	No-ma	

=== Television series ===
Year	Title	Role	Ref.
2015	Sassy, GO GO	Hyun-su	
2018	The Miracle We Met	Mao	
2019	Love with Flaws	Joo Seo-joon	
2021	Supermodel	Jung-seok	
2021	Midnight Thriller	Jung-seok	
2022	Ghost Doctor	Lee Seon-ho	
2024	Bad Memory Eraser	Yoon Te-oh	

=== Web series ===
Year	Title	Role	Notes	Ref.
2019	My First First Love	Dae-geon	Season 1–2	
2025	Villains	Fixer		

=== Television show ===
Year	Title	Role	Ref.
2013	After School Club	Host	
2016	The Immigration	Himself	
2016	Fact iN Star	Himself	
