= Cha In-ha =

South Korean actor (1992–2019)

- 차인하
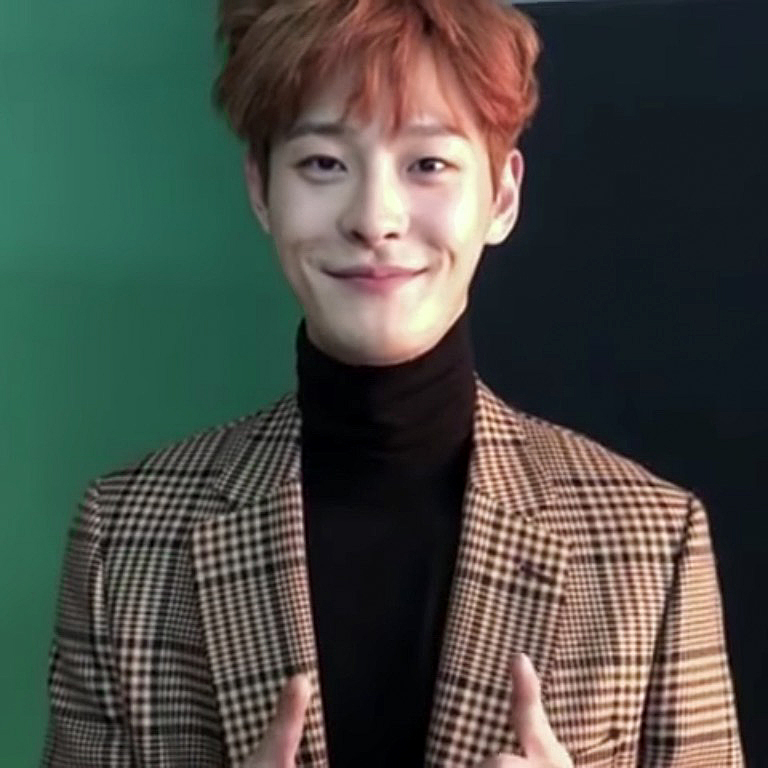
- Cha in November 2018
- Born: Lee Jae-ho; July 15, 1992; Seoul, South Korea
- Died: December 3, 2019 (aged 27); Seoul, South Korea
- Occupation: Actor
- Years active: 2017–2019
- Agent: Fantagio

Cha In-ha (July 15, 1992 – December 3, 2019) was a South Korean actor best known for starring in The Banker, Clean with Passion for Now, and Love with Flaws. He was a member of the actor group Surprise U.

== Biography ==
Cha In-ha was born Lee Jae-ho on July 15, 1992, in Sinchon. In 2017, he started his acting career as one of five members of Surprise U. He also starred in Deep Inside of Me. He played Hwang Jae Min in Clean with Passion for Now. He appeared in the You, Deep Inside of Me short film. He also appeared in Are You Human? and Temperature of Love. At the time of his death, he was playing Joo Won-seok in Love with Flaws.

=== Death ===
Cha died on December 3, 2019, of undisclosed causes. He was found dead in his house in the Gangnam District of Seoul by his manager. Cha's agency, Fantagio, has advised against spreading "rumors [and] speculative reports" involving his death out of respect for his family, and they have stated that he would have a private funeral. A police spokesman stated that Cha left "no will or final message", and that his family has requested an autopsy not be conducted.

The New York Times, The Guardian, and Deadline Hollywood have made comparisons of his death to those of Sulli and Goo Hara, both of whom died young within two months of his death. Korea Times reported that concerns over copycat suicides have been raised.

== Filmography ==
=== Television series ===
Year	Title	Role	Ref.
2017	Temperature of Love	Kim Ha-seong	
2018	Queen of Mystery 2	Dae-yoon	
2018	Wok of Love	Bong Chi-soo	
2018	Are You Human?	Hwang Ji-yong	
2018–2019	Clean with Passion for Now	Hwang Jae-min	
2019	Miss Independent Ji-eun 2	Ha-jun	
2019	The Banker	Moon Hong-joo	
2019	Love with Flaws	Joo Won-seok	
