= Lee Se-mi =

South Korean actress (born 1984)

- Born: 24 February 1984 (age 42); Seoul, South Korea
- Other names: Semi, Isemi
- Education: Dongduk Women's University (Department of Broadcasting and Entertainment)
- Occupations: Actress; singer; host
- Years active: 1998–present
- Spouse: Min Woo-hyuk (m. 2012)
- Children: 2

Lee Se-mi is a South Korean actress, singer and host. She was also a member of girls group LPG. She is also known for her roles in dramas and movies, she appeared in dramas Tmorrow, Terms of Endearment and Goblin Ttukgudak. She also appeared in movies such as The Romantic President and Attack the Gas Station 2.

== Personal life ==
She married actor Min Woo-hyuk in 2012 in Seoul. She left the Entertainment Industry in 2013 then she returned. She does hosting and advertisements. She has two children a son, Park Yi-deun (2015) and a daughter, Park Yi-eum (2020).

== Filmography ==
=== Television series ===
Year	Title	Role	Ref.
1998	Tomorrow	Lee Se-mi	
2004	Terms of Endearment	Ji-se	
2011	Goblin Ttukgudak	Cho-young	

=== Film ===
Year	Title	Role	Language	Ref.
2002	The Romantic President	Lee Su-jung	Korean	
2010	Attack the Gas Station 2	Lee Se-min	Korean	
