= Samsin Jeseok =

Three gods of the Korean Gasin faith

- Triple gods of Fate
- Member of Gasin pantheon
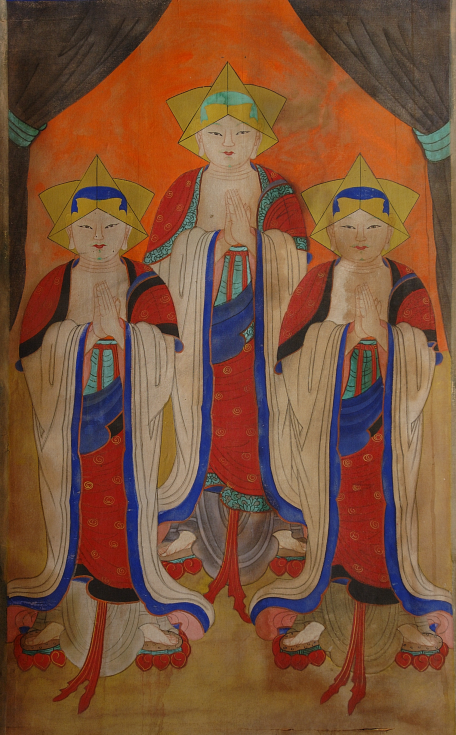
- Painting of Samsin Jeseok at a shamanic shrine in Yongsan-gu, Seoul, 19th-century.
- Other names: Sambul Jeseok; Jeseoksin
- Hangul: 삼신제석
- Venerated in: Muism; Gasin faith
- Gender: Male
- Region: Korea
- Ethnic group: Koreans

Genealogy
- Parents: Danggeum-aegi (mother)

Equivalents
- Buddhist: Śakra

In Korean mythology, Samsin Jeseok (Korean: 삼신제석; Hanja: 三神帝釋; lit. 'Jeseok triplets') or Sambul Jeseok (삼불제석; 三佛帝釋), Simply Jeseoksin (제석신; 帝釋神; lit. 'Jeseok god') is the triple gods in charge of the fate of the family. It is considered a god created by the fusion of Buddhist Indra with Korean Gasin faith. It is believed that it is mainly in charge of the life and blessings of descendants, and in Honam, it also has the nature of ancestors and agricultural gods.

== Name ==
The theonym "Jeseok" is found everywhere except in the East Coast-Gyeongsang tradition, where other theonyms such as "Sejon" are used. Both Jeseok and Sejon are Buddhist names; 제석; 帝釋 Jeseok is the Korean name of the Buddhist god Indra, and 세존; 世尊 Sejon "world-honored" is an East Asian epithet of the Buddha. The worship of Sejon is also associated with fertility.

== Mythology ==
According to Jeseok bon-puri, Samsin Jeseok is the triplet sons of a Dangeum-aegi. Danggeum-aegi is the virgin daughter of a nobleman. When her parents and brothers are temporarily absent, a Buddhist priest comes on an alms round to her house. Danggeum-aegi gives alms in the form of rice, but the priest usually stalls for time by spilling all the rice that she gives, so that she must pick them up and offer them again.

In the Jeolla tradition, the priest then briefly grasps her wrist before leaving. In the west-central tradition, Danggeum-aegi eats three of the grains of rice that the priest has spilled. In the northern and East Coast-Gyeongsang traditions, the girl offers the priest lodging in her father's room, but he refuses. He consecutively rejects her offer of every room in the mansion until she agrees to share her own room with him, where they have sex. In any case, the girl becomes pregnant. When her family returns, they attempt to kill her to salvage the family's honor but fail, sometimes because rocks and earth fall on top of her parents and brothers while celestial light shines on the girl.

In the west-central and Jeolla traditions, they then expel her from the household. Danggeum-aegi successfully finds the priest and gives birth in his presence to sons, usually but not always triplets. The priest abandons Buddhism and starts a family with her and the sons. In the Jeolla tradition, the myth ends here without anybody becoming gods. In the west-central tradition, the priest confers divinity upon his sons with Danggeum-aegi as the Jeseoksin.

In the northern and East Coast-Gyeongsang traditions, the family imprisons Danggeum-aegi in a pit or stone chest, but she miraculously survives and always gives birth to triplet sons. Danggeum-aegi is then brought back to the family. In most versions, the triplets prove to be supernaturally talented, such that the other children repeatedly attempt and fail to murder them out of envy. One day, the triplets ask who their father is. Danggeum-aegi usually gives the names of various trees as their father, but each tree tells the triplets that she is lying. Once she admits the truth, the brothers go out to find their father. When they reach the priest's temple, he gives them a series of impossible tasks to verify their parentage. This includes walking in water while wearing paper shoes without making any of the paper wet, crossing a river using only the bones of cows dead for three years, creating a rooster out of straw that perches and crows, and eating a fish and then vomiting it out alive. The triplets succeed in all these tasks, and the priest acknowledges that they are his sons when he sees that his blood mingles with the triplets'. The priest then makes Danggeum-aegi the goddess of childbirth, and the triplets either the Samsin Jeseok or a group of equivalent fertility deities.

== See also ==
- Samsin Halmeoni
