= Hide and Seek (TV series) =

2018 South Korean television series

- Promotional poster
- Hangul: 숨바꼭질
- RR: Sumbakkokjil
- MR: Sumbakkokchil
- Genre: Romance; Melodrama; Mystery
- Created by: Kim Sung-mo
- Written by: Seol Kyung-eun
- Directed by: Shin Yong-whee
- Starring: Lee Yu-ri; Song Chang-eui; Uhm Hyun-kyung; Kim Young-min
- Music by: Gaemi
- Country of origin: South Korea
- Original language: Korean
- No. of episodes: 48 (Note: In order to circumvent Korean laws that prevent commercial breaks in the middle of an episode, what would previously have been aired as single 70 minute episodes are now being repackaged as two 35 minute episodes, with two episodes being shown each night with a commercial break between the two.)

Production
- Executive producers: Bae Ik-hyeon; Lee Hyang-bong
- Running time: 35 minutes
- Production company: Neo Entertainment

Original release
- Network: MBC TV
- Release: August 25 – November 17, 2018

Hide and Seek (Korean: 숨바꼭질; RR: Sumbakkokjil) is a South Korean television series starring Lee Yu-ri, Song Chang-eui, Uhm Hyun-kyung and Kim Young-min. The series aired every Saturday from August 25 to November 17, 2018, on MBC TV from 8:45 p.m. to 11:10 p.m. (KST). It had 4 episodes a day.

== Synopsis ==
The tangled fates of the heiress of a cosmetics company and a woman who had to achieve everything on her own.

== Cast ==
=== Main ===
- Lee Yu-ri as Min Chae-rin
  - Jo Ye-rin as young Chae-rin

A sly and strong-willed executive director of a cosmetics company but deep inside she craves love from her family.

- Song Chang-eui as Cha Eun-hyuk
  - Choi Seung-hoon as young Eun-hyuk

A secretary and driver for Taesan Group.

- Uhm Hyun-kyung as Ha Yeon-joo / Min Soo-a
  - Shin Rin-ah as young Soo-a

An employee for Make Pacific. She is kind-hearted but jealousy will turn her into an evil and spiteful woman.

- Kim Young-min as Moon Jae-sang

A playboy who is the successor of Taesan Group.

=== Supporting ===
- Jung Hye-sun as Na Hae-geum
- Yoon Joo-sang as Moon Tae San
- Lee Jong-won as Min Joon-sik
- Lee Won-jong as Jo Pil-doo
- Jo Mi-ryung as Park Hae-ran
- Seo Joo-hee as Do Hyun-sook
- Yoon Da-kyung as General Manager Kim
- Kim Hye-ji as Ha Geum-joo
- Choi Hee-jin as Ha Dong-joo
- Ahn Bo-hyun as Baek Do-hoon
- Lee Yong-nyeo as Buddhist Choi

== Production ==
- The first script reading took place on June 30, 2018, at MBC Broadcasting Station in Sangam-dong, Seoul, South Korea.

== International broadcast ==
In Vietnam, the series was broadcast on VTV3 at 17:20 on weekdays from May 26, 2020, under the title Trò trốn tìm.

== Ratings ==
- In the table below, the blue numbers represent the lowest ratings and the red numbers represent the highest ratings.
- NR denotes that the drama did not rank in the top 20 daily programs on that date.
- N/A denotes that the rating is not known.

Ep.	Original broadcast date	Average audience share			
Ep.	Original broadcast date	TNmS		AGB Nielsen	
Ep.	Original broadcast date	Nationwide	Seoul	Nationwide	Seoul
1	August 25, 2018	2.7%	2.8%	3.2% (NR)	3.4% (NR)
2	August 25, 2018	6.8%	6.9%	7.2% (11th)	7.2% (11th)
3	August 25, 2018	6.5%	6.7%	7.0% (12th)	7.2% (11th)
4	August 25, 2018	7.7%	8.0%	8.1% (10th)	8.4% (9th)
5	September 8, 2018	3.0%	—N/a	3.7% (NR)	3.9% (NR)
6	September 8, 2018	7.6%	—N/a	7.2% (11th)	7.0% (11th)
7	September 8, 2018	6.7%	—N/a	6.8% (14th)	6.8% (14th)
8	September 8, 2018	8.5%	—N/a	8.6% (5th)	8.7% (6th)
9	September 15, 2018	3.7%	—N/a	4.9% (NR)	4.4% (NR)
10	September 15, 2018	7.7%	—N/a	8.6% (12th)	8.0% (11th)
11	September 15, 2018	6.5%	—N/a	7.3% (15th)	6.7% (19th)
12	September 15, 2018	7.6%	—N/a	9.2% (6th)	8.7% (8th)
13	September 22, 2018	4.8%	—N/a	5.5% (NR)	5.1% (NR)
14	September 22, 2018	10.5%	—N/a	10.2% (6th)	9.8% (6th)
15	September 22, 2018	11.0%	—N/a	10.3% (5th)	10.1% (4th)
16	September 22, 2018	11.8%	—N/a	11.0% (3rd)	10.6% (3rd)
17	September 29, 2018	4.6%	—N/a	5.5% (NR)	4.9% (NR)
18	September 29, 2018	8.1%	—N/a	7.7% (14th)	7.3% (15th)
19	September 29, 2018	7.0%	—N/a	6.6% (19th)	6.5% (18th)
20	September 29, 2018	8.8%	—N/a	9.1% (7th)	
21	October 6, 2018	—N/a	—N/a	5.7% (NR)	5.4% (NR)
22	October 6, 2018	—N/a	—N/a	11.3% (5th)	11.5% (4th)
23	October 6, 2018	—N/a	—N/a	11.3% (5th)	11.4% (5th)
24	October 6, 2018	—N/a	—N/a	13.1% (3rd)	13.0% (3rd)
25	October 13, 2018	5.3%	—N/a	5.3% (NR)	5.0% (NR)
26	October 13, 2018	11.0%	—N/a	10.2% (5th)	10.0% (5th)
27	October 13, 2018	10.8%	—N/a	10.6% (4th)	10.5% (4th)
28	October 13, 2018	11.4%	—N/a	11.2% (3rd)	11.1% (3rd)
29	October 20, 2018	3.6%	—N/a	3.6% (NR)	3.3% (NR)
30	October 20, 2018	8.2%	—N/a	8.1% (6th)	7.9% (8th)
31	October 20, 2018	11.3%	—N/a	11.0% (5th)	
32	October 20, 2018	12.6%	—N/a	11.8% (4th)	11.9% (4th)
33	October 27, 2018	5.5%	—N/a	5.9% (NR)	5.2% (NR)
34	October 27, 2018	12.8%	—N/a	11.4% (4th)	11.2% (4th)
35	October 27, 2018	13.0%	—N/a	11.2% (5th)	11.1% (5th)
36	October 27, 2018	14.1%	—N/a	12.0% (3rd)	
37	November 3, 2018	10.2%	—N/a	9.9% (7th)	9.3% (8th)
38	November 3, 2018	13.3%	—N/a	12.7% (4th)	12.4% (4th)
39	November 3, 2018	12.8%	—N/a	12.6% (5th)	11.8% (5th)
40	November 3, 2018	13.5%	—N/a	13.3% (3rd)	13.1% (3rd)
41	November 10, 2018	10.5%	—N/a	10.6% (6th)	12.1% (4th)
42	November 10, 2018	13.7%	—N/a	12.9% (4th)	11.6% (5th)
43	November 10, 2018	12.9%	—N/a	12.2% (5th)	11.6% (5th)
44	November 10, 2018	14.0%	—N/a	13.4% (3rd)	12.8% (3rd)
45	November 17, 2018	7.8%	—N/a	7.3% (12th)	6.7% (16th)
46	November 17, 2018	14.0%	—N/a	13.2% (5th)	11.6% (5th)
47	November 17, 2018	13.9%	—N/a	13.6% (4th)	12.5% (4th)
48	November 17, 2018	15.2%	—N/a	15.4% (3rd)	14.4% (3rd)
Average		-	-	15.4%	14.4%

- No episode aired on September 1 due to coverage of the 2018 Asian Games.

== Awards and nominations ==
Year	Award	Category	Nominee	Result	Ref.
2018	6th APAN Star Awards	Top Excellence Award, Actress in a Serial Drama	Lee Yoo-ri	Nominated	
2018	2018 MBC Drama Awards	Grand Prize (Daesang)	Lee Yoo-ri	Nominated	
2018	2018 MBC Drama Awards	Drama of the Year	Hide and Seek	Nominated	
2018	2018 MBC Drama Awards	Top Excellence Award, Actress in a Weekend Drama	Lee Yoo-ri	Won	
2018	2018 MBC Drama Awards	Top Excellence Award, Actor in a Weekend Special Project	Song Chang-eui	Nominated	
2018	2018 MBC Drama Awards	Excellence Award, Actor in a Weekend Special Project	Kim Young-min	Nominated	
2018	2018 MBC Drama Awards	Excellence Award, Actress in a Weekend Special Project	Uhm Hyun-kyung	Nominated	
2018	2018 MBC Drama Awards	Best Supporting Cast in Weekend Special Project	Jo Mi-ryung	Nominated	
2018	2018 MBC Drama Awards	Best Supporting Cast in Weekend Special Project	Yoon Da-gyeong	Nominated	
2018	2018 MBC Drama Awards	Best Child Actress	Jo Ye-rin	Won	
