= Enemies from the Past =

2017 South Korean television series

- Promotional poster
- Also known as: Forever Enemies
- Hangul: 전생에 웬수들
- RR: Jeonsaenge wensudeul
- MR: Chŏnsaenge wensudŭl
- Genre: Family; Melodrama
- Created by: Kim Seung-mo; Jang Jae-hoon
- Written by: Kim Ji-eun
- Directed by: Kim Heung-dong
- Starring: Choi Yoon-young; Goo Won; Ahn Jae-mo; Go Na-yeon
- Country of origin: South Korea
- Original language: Korean
- No. of episodes: 123 (Note: Originally scheduled to air for 120 episodes, the series was extended by three episodes in lieu of 12 pre-empts.)

Production
- Executive producer: Kim Dong-rae
- Running time: 35 minutes
- Production company: Raemongraein

Original release
- Network: MBC TV
- Release: November 27, 2017 – June 1, 2018

Enemies from the Past (Korean: 전생에 웬수들; RR: Jeonsaenge wensudeul) is a 2017 South Korean television series starring Choi Yoon-young, Goo Won, Ahn Jae-mo, and Go Na-yeon. The series aired daily on MBC TV from 7:15 p.m. to 7:55 p.m. (KST) starting from November 27, 2017.

== Synopsis ==
After her father left the family home after having an affair ten years previous, Choi Go-ya supports her family by doing part-time work. She is now looking for a full-time job. Min Ji-seok is a lawyer who specializes in divorces and is skeptical about marriage, but he meets Go-ya and gets close to her. However, they face difficulties as their families are enemies.

== Cast ==
=== Main ===
- Choi Yoon-young as Choi Go-ya
- Gu Won as Min Ji-seok
- Ahn Jae-mo as Min Eun-seok
- Go Na-yeon as Choi Go-bong

=== Supporting ===
==== People around Choi Go-ya ====
- Han Jin-hee as Choi Tae-pyung
- Lee Bo-hee as Woo Yang-sook
- No Young-min as Choi Go-woon
- Lee Sang-ah as Choi Tae-ran
- Park Hyun-seok as Choi San-deok

==== People around Min Ji-seok ====
- Lee Young-ran as Jang Ok-ja
- Geum Bo-ra as Oh Sa-ra
- Choi Su-rin as Oh Na-ra
- Myung Ji-yeon as Jo Hae-eun
- Han Kap-soo as Han Jae-woong

==== Others ====
- Lee Sang-sook as Ha Ji-na
- Park Dong-bin as Attorney's office worker
- Seo Sung-kwang

=== Special appearances ===
- Kim Kyung-ryong
- Park Si-eun
- Lee Hyun-seung

== Ratings ==
- In this table, the blue numbers represent the lowest ratings and the red numbers represent the highest ratings.
- NR denotes that the drama did not rank in the top 20 daily programs on that date.
- N/A denotes that the rating is not known.

Ep.	Original broadcast date	Average audience share			
Ep.	Original broadcast date	TNmS Ratings		AGB Nielsen	
Ep.	Original broadcast date	Nationwide	Seoul	Nationwide	Seoul
1	November 27, 2017	11.1% (7th)	9.8% (7th)	9.8% (8th)	9.2% (12th)
2	November 28, 2017	10.6% (8th)	8.1% (10th)	9.3% (7th)	8.8% (7th)
3	November 29, 2017	9.9% (8th)	7.8% (8th)	9.0% (8th)	8.3% (9th)
4	November 30, 2017	9.7% (11th)	7.6% (14th)	8.9% (11th)	8.3% (9th)
5	December 1, 2017	10.6% (8th)	8.8% (9th)	9.0% (11th)	8.3% (11th)
6	December 4, 2017	10.7% (6th)	8.0% (12th)	9.6% (7th)	9.5% (8th)
7	December 5, 2017	9.9% (8th)	7.8% (8th)	9.3% (5th)	8.8% (5th)
8	December 6, 2017	10.3% (8th)	8.8% (8th)	9.4% (6th)	9.0% (6th)
9	December 7, 2017	11.6% (6th)	10.1% (5th)	8.7% (9th)	8.8% (9th)
10	December 8, 2017	11.0% (7th)	8.7% (10th)	9.7% (8th)	9.5% (8th)
11	December 11, 2017	10.5% (7th)	7.9% (10th)	9.2% (7th)	9.2% (6th)
12	December 12, 2017	10.5% (7th)	7.9% (10th)	9.2% (7th)	9.2% (6th)
13	December 13, 2017	11.1% (6th)	8.4% (7th)	9.3% (7th)	8.6% (7th)
14	December 14, 2017	11.6% (6th)	9.6% (7th)	9.0% (8th)	8.5% (9th)
15	December 15, 2017	10.8% (7th)	8.8% (10th)	9.9% (10th)	10.2% (9th)
16	December 18, 2017	11.2% (8th)	8.2% (12th)	9.2% (9th)	8.7% (10th)
17	December 19, 2017	11.3% (4th)	8.9% (5th)	9.0% (10th)	8.3% (9th)
18	December 20, 2017	10.7% (6th)	8.4% (8th)	9.8% (7th)	9.5% (6th)
19	December 21, 2017	11.8% (5th)	9.0% (7th)	9.7% (7th)	9.5% (7th)
20	December 22, 2017	9.7% (9th)	6.8% (16th)	9.0% (14th)	8.5% (13th)
21	December 25, 2017	10.8% (6th)	8.2% (10th)	8.6% (11th)	7.9% (13th)
22	December 26, 2017	11.3% (4th)	—N/a	9.8% (6th)	9.3% (6th)
23	December 27, 2017	11.7% (5th)	8.6% (10th)	9.5% (7th)	9.0% (5th)
24	December 28, 2017	12.6% (6th)	9.5% (7th)	9.2% (9th)	8.6% (11th)
25	December 29, 2017	11.9% (5th)	8.6% (12th)	9.8% (9th)	9.5% (7th)
26	January 1, 2018	11.9% (4th)	10.6%	10.0% (6th)	8.7% (12th)
27	January 2, 2018	13.5% (4th)	12.7%	10.2% (4th)	9.4% (5th)
28	January 3, 2018	12.9% (4th)	10.0% (4th)	10.9% (4th)	11.0% (4th)
29	January 4, 2018	13.2% (3rd)	12.6%	11.4% (5th)	10.8% (6th)
30	January 5, 2018	13.4% (3rd)	12.9%	10.7% (6th)	10.4% (9th)
31	January 8, 2018	12.5% (4th)	11.7%	9.8% (9th)	9.1% (10th)
32	January 9, 2018	11.7% (5th)	10.9%	10.2% (6th)	9.4% (5th)
33	January 10, 2018	12.5% (5th)	11.9%	11.4% (5th)	10.8% (5th)
34	January 11, 2018	13.2% (5th)	12.0%	10.6% (7th)	9.9% (6th)
35	January 12, 2018	13.5% (3rd)	12.9%	11.1% (8th)	10.5% (9th)
36	January 15, 2018	12.5% (5th)	11.6%	11.1% (4th)	10.2% (5th)
37	January 16, 2018	12.4% (5th)	12.1%	11.1% (4th)	10.8% (4th)
38	January 17, 2018	12.7% (4th)	12.2%	10.2% (5th)	9.7% (4th)
39	January 18, 2018	12.1% (4th)	11.5%	9.9% (7th)	9.3% (7th)
40	January 19, 2018	12.2% (6th)	11.6%	10.2% (8th)	9.7% (5th)
41	January 22, 2018	12.7% (4th)	12.0%	10.2% (5th)	9.5% (8th)
42	January 23, 2018	13.5% (5th)	12.7%	11.1% (6th)	10.3% (6th)
43	January 24, 2018	13.7% (4th)	13.4%	11.1% (5th)	10.8% (6th)
44	January 25, 2018	14.0% (4th)	13.5%	11.2% (7th)	10.7% (7th)
45	January 26, 2018	14.3% (4th)	13.8%	10.9% (9th)	10.4% (9th)
46	January 29, 2018	13.4% (4th)	11.9%	10.7% (7th)	9.2% (9th)
47	January 30, 2018	13.0% (5th)	12.6%	10.8% (6th)	10.4% (4th)
48	January 31, 2018	13.3% (5th)	12.4%	11.8% (7th)	10.9% (6th)
49	February 1, 2018	14.4% (4th)	13.7%	12.2% (8th)	11.5% (7th)
50	February 2, 2018	13.9% (4th)	13.1%	11.9% (7th)	11.2% (7th)
51	February 5, 2018	14.2% (5th)	13.4%	11.5% (7th)	10.7% (7th)
52	February 6, 2018	13.9% (4th)	13.1%	11.4% (5th)	10.6% (4th)
53	February 7, 2018	12.8% (7th)	12.7%	11.4% (8th)	11.4% (7th)
54	February 8, 2018	7.1% (14th)	6.8%	6.2% (15th)	5.9% (17th)
55	February 9, 2018	7.7% (16th)	7.6%	5.9% (19th)	6.0% (16th)
56	February 26, 2018 (Note: No episodes were aired between February 12–23 due to coverage of the 2018 Winter Olympics.)	12.0% (6th)	11.9%	9.6% (9th)	9.6% (9th)
57	February 27, 2018	12.5% (5th)	12.3%	10.0% (7th)	10.2% (6th)
58	February 28, 2018	13.3% (5th)	12.7%	10.8% (7th)	10.2% (6th)
59	March 1, 2018	11.9% (7th)	10.8%	9.6% (9th)	8.5% (11th)
60	March 2, 2018	12.9% (6th)	12.1%	9.7% (10th)	8.9% (10th)
61	March 5, 2018	13.5% (5th)	11.7%	9.7% (10th)	7.9% (12th)
62	March 6, 2018 (Note: These episodes did not air at their usual times due to special news programs.)	8.4% (15th)	7.9%	6.3% (18th)	5.8% (NR)
63	March 7, 2018	13.5% (5th)	12.9%	10.8% (6th)	10.3% (6th)
64	March 8, 2018	13.8% (4th)	11.0%	10.9% (6th)	10.1% (7th)
65	March 9, 2018	11.4% (5th)	8.2%	8.9% (10th)	8.7% (11th)
66	March 12, 2018	13.0% (5th)	10.4%	10.5% (5th)	9.9% (5th)
67	March 13, 2018	12.9% (4th)	10.3%	10.6% (5th)	10.1% (5th)
68	March 14, 2018	8.3% (10th)	5.8%	5.9% (15th)	5.5% (19th)
69	March 15, 2018	13.6% (4th)	11.0%	10.7% (8th)	10.1% (8th)
70	March 16, 2018	13.3% (5th)	10.9%	9.6% (9th)	9.1% (9th)
71	March 19, 2018	13.9% (5th)	11.2%	11.8% (4th)	11.1% (5th)
72	March 20, 2018	14.7% (4th)	12.2%	11.4% (5th)	10.9% (5th)
73	March 21, 2018	14.0% (5th)	11.3%	12.0% (6th)	11.5% (6th)
74	March 22, 2018	13.7% (6th)	10.9%	10.4% (8th)	9.6% (8th)
75	March 23, 2018	13.4% (5th)	10.6%	10.3% (8th)	9.5% (10th)
76	March 26, 2018	13.4% (5th)	10.5%	9.9% (8th)	9.1% (10th)
77	March 27, 2018	12.6% (5th)	9.4%	10.7% (6th)	10.6% (5th)
78	March 28, 2018	7.3% (15th)	4.7%	6.1% (19th)	6.5% (15th)
79	March 29, 2018	13.7% (4th)	11.4%	11.2% (5th)	10.9% (4th)
80	March 30, 2018	12.8% (5th)	10.2%	10.3% (7th)	9.9% (9th)
81	April 2, 2018	11.8% (6th)	9.1%	9.8% (9th)	9.2% (11th)
82	April 3, 2018	11.4% (5th)	8.6%	9.5% (7th)	8.7% (10th)
83	April 4, 2018	10.8% (6th)	7.7%	10.4% (6th)	9.4% (6th)
84	April 6, 2018 (Note: No episode was aired on April 5 due to the special broadcast of the Spring is Coming concert held in Pyongyang, North Korea.)	6.1% (NR)	3.2%	4.3% (NR)	4.5% (NR)
85	April 9, 2018	12.3% (6th)	9.8%	10.6% (7th)	10.1% (8th)
86	April 10, 2018	12.9% (5th)	10.5%	10.9% (5th)	10.6% (5th)
87	April 11, 2018	12.1% (5th)	9.4%	10.5% (6th)	9.9% (4th)
88	April 12, 2018	12.0% (5th)	8.6%	10.2% (6th)	9.8% (5th)
89	April 13, 2018	12.1% (6th)	9.0%	10.2% (8th)	10.1% (9th)
90	April 16, 2018	7.8% (11th)	5.6%	5.3% (NR)	5.1% (20th)
91	April 17, 2018	12.5% (5th)	9.8%	9.5% (6th)	8.7% (8th)
92	April 18, 2018	11.9% (5th)	9.2%	10.3% (6th)	9.7% (4th)
93	April 19, 2018	12.0% (5th)	9.3%	9.4% (6th)	8.2% (9th)
94	April 20, 2018	12.5% (5th)	9.9%	9.5% (9th)	8.8% (11th)
95	April 23, 2018	14.4% (4th)	11.8%	12.4% (4th)	11.7% (4th)
96	April 24, 2018	12.9% (5th)	10.7%	10.6% (6th)	9.5% (8th)
97	April 25, 2018	11.5% (5th)	8.9%	9.6% (6th)	9.0% (6th)
98	April 26, 2018 (Note: No episode was aired on April 27 due to the special news coverage of the April 2018 inter-Korean summit.)	11.2% (5th)	8.5%	9.4% (7th)	8.7% (8th)
99	April 30, 2018	11.7% (6th)	8.6%	9.3% (8th)	8.3% (9th)
100	May 1, 2018	11.4% (5th)	8.5%	10.1% (7th)	9.2% (7th)
101	May 2, 2018	10.1% (6th)	6.9%	11.5% (5th)	11.3% (4th)
102	May 3, 2018	11.5% (5th)	8.7%	10.2% (6th)	9.6% (7th)
103	May 4, 2018	11.3% (6th)	8.5%	9.4% (8th)	9.0% (9th)
104	May 7, 2018	11.7% (5th)	9.0%	9.1% (7th)	8.8% (8th)
105	May 8, 2018	12.3% (5th)	9.6%	9.4% (7th)	8.7% (7th)
106	May 9, 2018	11.2% (5th)	8.5%	10.1% (6th)	9.7% (5th)
107	May 10, 2018	12.1% (5th)	9.3%	9.9% (6th)	9.4% (6th)
108	May 11, 2018	12.3% (5th)	9.6%	9.1% (9th)	8.7% (10th)
109	May 14, 2018	12.3% (6th)	9.7%	10.7% (7th)	9.8% (7th)
110	May 15, 2018	12.5% (4th)	10.2%	10.3% (6th)	10.1% (6th)
111	May 16, 2018	12.4% (6th)	9.8%	11.0% (4th)	10.3% (4th)
112	May 17, 2018	13.0% (4th)	10.4%	11.7% (4th)	11.7% (3rd)
113	May 18, 2018	12.8% (6th)	10.2%	10.5% (7th)	9.5% (7th)
114	May 21, 2018	11.8% (6th)	9.2%	10.4% (6th)	9.8% (7th)
115	May 22, 2018	11.4% (4th)	8.8%	11.3% (5th)	11.0% (5th)
116	May 23, 2018	12.4% (6th)	9.8%	11.1% (6th)	10.9% (4th)
117	May 24, 2018	12.9% (5th)	10.3%	11.1% (5th)	10.8% (5th)
118	May 25, 2018	12.3% (6th)	9.7%	11.0% (6th)	10.4% (5th)
119	May 28, 2018	14.0% (3rd)	11.4%	11.5% (5th)	10.8% (4th)
120	May 29, 2018	14.2% (3rd)	11.8%	11.6% (6th)	11.2% (6th)
121	May 30, 2018	13.6% (4th)	10.9%	11.0% (5th)	10.4% (5th)
122	May 31, 2018	14.2% (3rd)	12.0%	11.6% (4th)	11.4% (4th)
123	June 1, 2018	11.6%	8.4%	9.6% (6th)	9.5% (8th)
Average		12.1%	10.0%	9.5%	9.5%
