= Jo Ye-rin =

South Korean child actor (born 2008)

- Born: 23 December 2008 (age 17); South Korea
- Occupation: Actress
- Years active: 2014–present

Korean name
- Hangul: 조예린
- RR: Jo Yerin
- MR: Cho Yerin

Jo Ye-rin (Korean: 조예린; born 23 December 2008) is a South Korean teenaged actress. She gained recognition for her role as Ho Ryeong in the drama Lovers of the Red Sky.

== Filmography ==
=== Television series ===
Year	Title	Role	Ref.
2014	You Are the Only One	Song Do-won (young)	
2015	Glamorous Temptation	Shin Eun-soo (child)	
2016	My Mind's Flower Rain	Min Young-ji	
2016	Don't Dare to Dream	Lee Ppal-gang (young)	
2017	Unknown Woman	Kim Bom (Kelly Kim)	
2017	Sisters-in-Law	Hwang Eun-byul (young)	
2018	Through the Waves	Oh Bok-shil (young)	
2018	Children of a Lesser God	Im Eun-hye	
2018	Hide and Seek	Min Chae-rin (young)	
2019	Haechi	Chun Yoon-young / Bok-dan (young)	
2019	The Tale of Nokdu	Dong Dong-joo / Yoo Eun-seo (young)	
2021	Lovers of the Red Sky	Ho Ryeong (Tiger Deity)	
2022	Glitch	Heo Bo-ra (young)	
2025	A Graceful Liar	Joo Young-chae (young)	

=== Film ===
Year	Title	Role	Ref.
2019	Kim Ji-young: Born 1982	Elementary school student (extra)	

== Awards and nominations ==
Name of the award ceremony, year presented, category, nominee of the award, and the result of the nomination
Award ceremony	Year	Category	Nominee / Work	Result	Ref.
9th Asian Model Awards	2014	Korea Kid Model	Jo Ye-rin	Won	
MBC Drama Awards	2018	Best Young Actress	Hide and Seek	Won	
SBS Drama Awards	2021	Scene Stealer Award	Lovers of the Red Sky	Nominated	
