= Motel California (TV series) =

2025 South Korean television series

- Promotional poster
- Hangul: 모텔 캘리포니아
- RR: Motel Kaelliponia
- MR: Mot'el K'aellip'onia
- Genre: Coming-of-age; Romance
- Based on: Home, Bitter Home by Shim Yoon-seo
- Written by: Lee Seo-yoon
- Directed by: Jang Joon-ho (Ep. 1-2); Kim Hyung-min; Lee Jae-jin (Ep. 3-present)
- Starring: Lee Se-young; Na In-woo; Choi Min-soo; Kim Tae-hyeong; Choi Hee-jin
- Music by: Park Se-joon (CP)
- Country of origin: South Korea
- Original language: Korean
- No. of episodes: 12

Production
- Executive producers: Koo Mi-young; Jeong Tae-joong
- Producers: Moon Bo-mi; Ji Hwan
- Production company: HB Entertainment

Original release
- Network: MBC TV
- Release: January 10 – February 15, 2025

Motel California (Korean: 모텔 캘리포니아) is a 2025 South Korean television series written by Lee Seo-yoon, directed by Kim Hyung-min, and starring Lee Se-young, Na In-woo, Choi Min-soo, Kim Tae-hyeong, and Choi Hee-jin. Based on the novel Home, Bitter Home by Shim Yoon-seo, it is a first love remodeling romance drama set in a rural area about a woman who was born and raised in a motel and reunites with her first love in her hometown she ran away from 12 years ago. It aired on MBC TV from January 10 to February 15, 2025 every Friday and Saturday at 21:50 (KST).

== Synopsis ==
The series tells the story of Kang-hee, who meets her first love again in her hometown where she ran away in the middle of the night for success and happiness 12 years ago and encounters the past that she had sealed away.

== Cast and characters ==
=== Main ===
- Lee Se-young as Ji Kang-hee

The protagonist born in the rural motel 'Motel California' and raised in motels. Her first love and neighborhood friend is Yeon-soo.

- Na In-woo as Cheon Yeon-soo

A pure man who has loved only one woman his whole life and a veterinarian who receives the attention of all the farm owners in the rural village.

- Choi Min-soo as Ji Chun-pil

The owner of Motel California and Kang-hee's father.

- Kim Tae-hyeong as Geum Seok-kyung

A self-made man who was born a tycoon but succeeded in starting a lodging app on his own.

- Choi Hee-jin as Yoon Nan-woo

A veterinarian and Yeon-soo's junior.

=== Supporting ===
==== Hwanggeum Bokja ====
- Seo Ye-hwa as Esther Park

An app engineer and Seok-kyung's friend.

- Woo Mi-hwa as Hwang Jeong-gu

CEO of Golden Park.

==== Gangster (Kang-hee Family) ====
- Koo Ja-sung as Cha Seung-eon

A childhood friend of Kang-hee and Yeon-soo, who drives a forklift in Hana-eup. He was abandoned in front of the motel when he was young and was raised by the motel owner Chun-pil and grew up with Kang-hee. He is usually gentle and quiet, but he explodes when someone precious to him is disturbed.

- Jung Yong-ju as Ryu Han-woo

A livestock farmer. He became a successful stockbroker, and bought a farm and cows for his parents in the countryside.

- Lee So-e as Han A-reum

A librarian who dreams of becoming a poet.

==== Hana-eup's Alumni ====
- Yoon Seung-woo as Kim Heon-yeol

A golden spoon building owner and Kang-hee's classmate from elementary school who has bullied her since the first day of elementary school.

- Ma Hyun-jin as Kim Yong-su

A hardware store owner. He knows everything about Hana-eup, from the big and small things to scandals and gossip.

- Lee So-geum as Choi Min-gu

A police and Kang-hee's classmate.

- Lee Rang-so as Jo Jin-ah A nursing care worker. She started volunteering for the elderly and got a license to work as a caregiver.
- Jeong Hyun-ji as No In-suk A bakery owner.

==== People of Hana-eup ====
- Ji Su-won as Sun-ja (Su-ji) Yeon-soo's mother.
- Moon Kyung-min as Ryu Deok-gu Han-woo's father.
- Bae Sin-ja as Lala The Lalami Salon's owner and Yong-su's mother.
- Park Yong as Kim Soo-nam Yong-su's father and Lara's husband. He runs the hardware store Yongsu Hardware in Hana-eup.
- Lee Kyu-ho as Mr. Kwon General Manager of Motel California.

== Production ==
=== Development ===
Motel California is based on novel Home, Bitter Home by Shim Yoon-seo. The series consists of 12 episodes.

On October 24, 2024, MBC told Maeil Business Newspaper that director Jang Joon-ho, who directed the series, has stepped down for health reasons. Kim Hyung-min, who directed Team B, would take over as the main director.

=== Casting ===
On May 1, 2024, a report came out that Lee Se-young and Na In-woo would be starring in the series. On June 13, MBC announced that actors Lee Se-young and Na In-woo had been confirmed to appear. On October 23, Choi Min-soo had been confirmed to appear. The next day, it was reported that Kim Tae-hyeong had confirmed his appearance.

== Viewership ==
Motel California : South Korea viewers per episode (thousands)

Season	Episode number											
Season	1	2	3	4	5	6	7	8	9	10	11	12
1	868	744	942	704	862	648	1031	622	780	N/A	664	1047

Source: Audience measurement performed nationwide by Nielsen Korea.

Average TV viewership ratings
Ep.	Original broadcast date	Average audience share (Nielsen Korea)	
Ep.	Original broadcast date	Nationwide	Seoul
1	January 10, 2025	4.5% (15th)	4.5% (14th)
2	January 11, 2025	3.8% (14th)	3.6% (12th)
3	January 17, 2025	5.2% (12th)	5.0% (12th)
4	January 18, 2025	3.6% (20th)	3.5% (20th)
5	January 24, 2025	4.7% (12th)	4.9% (12th)
6	January 25, 2025	3.4% (18th)	3.5% (14th)
7	January 31, 2025	6.0% (10th)	6.1% (9th)
8	February 1, 2025	3.4% (20th)	3.2% (20th)
9	February 7, 2025	4.2% (17th)	4.6% (15th)
10	February 8, 2025	3.5% (22nd)	3.7% (19th)
11	February 14, 2025	3.7% (16th)	3.8% (15th)
12	February 15, 2025	5.9% (6th)	5.9% (6th)
Average		4.3%	4.4%
In the table above, the blue numbers represent the lowest ratings and the red numbers represent the highest ratings.
