= Kim Tae-hyeong (actor) =

South Korean actor (born 1988)

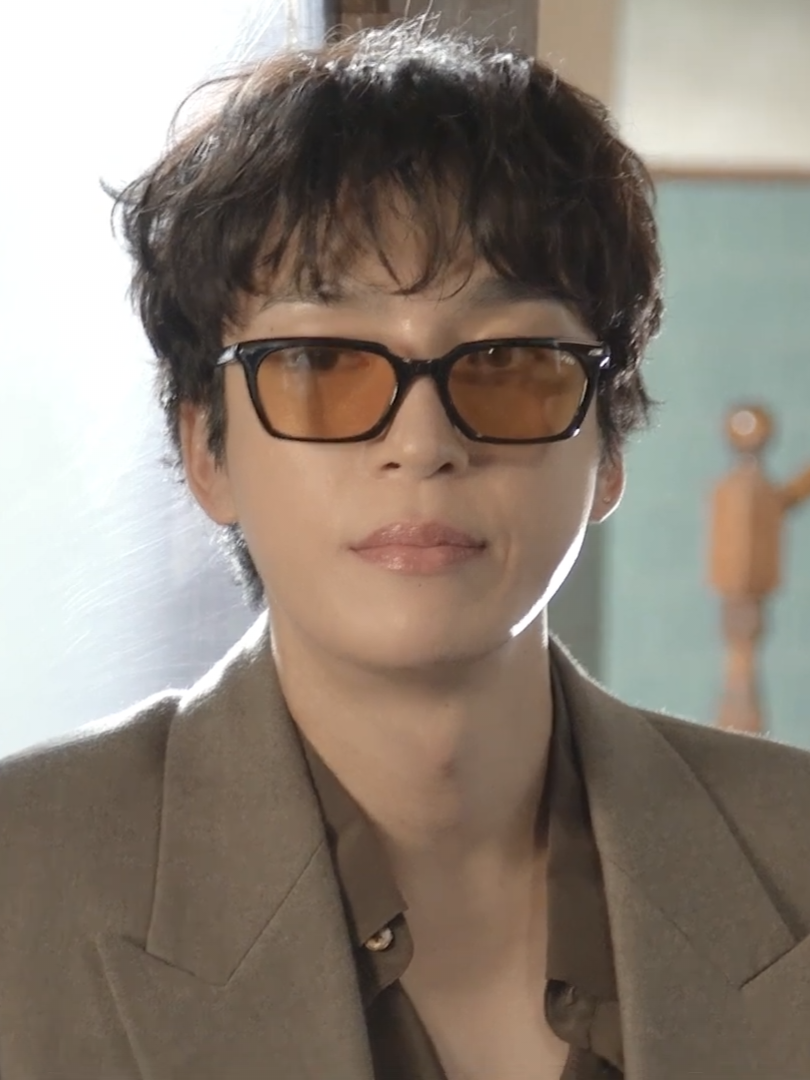
- Kim in January 2025
- Born: February 5, 1988 (age 38); Seoul, South Korea
- Other name: Goo Won
- Education: Chung-Ang University (Department of Theater and Film)
- Occupation: Actor
- Years active: 2009–present
- Agent: HB Entertainment
- Known for: Enemies from the Past; Legal High; Love with Flaws
- Website: hbenter.com

Kim Tae-hyeong (Korean: 김태형; born February 5, 1988) known formerly as Gu Won (구원) is a South Korean actor. He is best known for his roles in television dramas and movies such as Fists of Legend (2013), Enemies from the Past (2017), Legal High (2019), Discovery of Love (2014), Love with Flaws (2019).

== Biography and career ==
He studied film and drama at Chung Ang University and made his acting debut in the drama series Cheongdam-dong Alice in 2012. The following year he made his big-screen debut in the film Fists of Legend. He followed up with a role in the movie The Youth in 2014. More recently, he has appeared in drama series titles Legal High (2019) and Love with Flaws (2019).

== Filmography ==
=== Film ===
Film appearances
Year	Title	Role	Notes	Ref.
2013	Fists of Legend	Lee Sang-hoon		
2014	The Youth	Jong-gu		
2016	Insane	Woo-sub		
2021	I Will Song	Ba-ram		

=== Television series ===
Television series appearances
Year	Title	Role	Notes	Ref.
2012–2013	Cheongdam-dong Alice	Seo Ho-min		
2013	The Blade and Petal	Ho-tae		
2014	Discovery of Love	Choi Eun-kyu		
2014	KBS Drama Special – "I Introduce My Father"	Oh Dong-joo	Season 5; Episode 26	
2017	Enemies from the Past	Min Ji-seok		
2019	Legal High	Seong Gi-jun		
2019	Love with Flaws	Lee Min-hyuk		
2023	Decoy: Part 1	Jung Jae-hwang		
2023	Decoy: Part 2	Jung Jae-hwang		
2025	Motel California	Geum Seok-kyung		

== Bibliography ==
- What I Have (Poems)
