= Legal High (South Korean TV series) =

2019 South Korean television series

- Promotional poster
- Hangul: 리갈하이
- RR: Rigalhai
- MR: Rigarhai
- Genre: Legal drama; Comedy
- Developed by: JTBC
- Written by: Park Seong-jin
- Directed by: Kim Jung-hyun
- Starring: Jin Goo; Seo Eun-soo; Yoon Park
- Country of origin: South Korea
- Original language: Korean
- No. of episodes: 16

Production
- Executive producer: Jo Jun-hyung
- Producers: Kwak Hong-suk; Oh Sung-min
- Running time: 70 minutes
- Production company: GnG Production

Original release
- Network: JTBC
- Release: February 8 – March 30, 2019

Related
- Legal High (Japanese TV series)

Legal High (Korean: 리갈하이) is a 2019 South Korean television series starring Jin Goo, Seo Eun-soo and Yoon Park. It is a remake of the award-winning 2012 Japanese TV series of the same title. It aired on JTBC from February 8 to March 30, 2019.

== Synopsis ==
The series tells the story of two completely different lawyers who end up working together to win court cases for their clients.

== Cast ==
=== Main ===
- Jin Goo as Go Tae-rim, an arrogant lawyer but has a 100 percent success rate in his cases.
  - Choi Seung-hoon as young Go Tae-rim
- Seo Eun-soo as Seo Jae-in, a passionate rookie and righteous lawyer.
- Yoon Park as Kang Ki-seok, an ace lawyer who is Tae-rim's rival. He is calm and gentle with a strong charisma.

=== Supporting ===
==== People around Tae-rim ====
- Lee Soon-jae as Goo Se-joong, a notable lawyer and the saviour of B&G Law Firm.
- Jang Yoo-sang as Kim Yi-soo, an informant.

==== People around Jae-in ====
- Moon Ye-won as Nam Sul-hee, Jae-in's university friend.
- Kim Ho-jung as Professor Song, Jae-in's guardian.
- Ahn Nae-sang as Seo Dong-soo, Jae-in's father.

==== B&G Law Firm ====
- Kim Byeong-ok as Bang Dae-han, the CEO of B&G Law Firm.
- Chae Jung-an as Min Joo-kyung, a partner lawyer who has a great source of information. Her looks contradicts her personality.
- Jung Sang-hoon as Yoon Sang-goo, an ambitious lawyer who dreams of beating Tae-rim.
- Gu Won as Sung Gi-jun, the heir of Hankang's Group.

==== Special appearances ====
- Joo Suk-tae as Lawyer Yoo (Ep. 1–2)

== Production ==
The first script reading was held in December 2018 at the JTBC building in Sangam, Seoul with the attendance of the cast and crew.

== Original soundtrack ==
Legal High OST

Soundtrack album by Various artists
- Recorded: 2019
- Genre: Soundtrack
- Languages: Korean; English
- Labels: MUSIC&NEW, Music Buddy

Part 1

Released on February 15, 2019
No.	Title	Lyrics	Music	Artist	Length
1.	"If You're With Me" (같진 않을까)	Choi Sang-yeob, Park Se-jun	Choi Sang-yeob, Park Se-jun	Yoon Hyun-sang	3:34
2.	"If You're With Me" (Inst.)		Choi Sang-yeob, Park Se-jun		3:34
Total length:					7:08

Part 2

Released on February 22, 2019
No.	Title	Lyrics	Music	Artist	Length
1.	"Hold My Hands" (내 손 꼭 잡아)	Han Joon, Park Se-jun	Lee Yoo-jin, Park Se-jun	Ahn Hyeon-jeong	3:01
2.	"Hold My Hands" (Inst.)		Lee Yoo-jin, Park Se-jun		3:01
Total length:					6:02

Part 3

Released on March 1, 2019
No.	Title	Lyrics	Music	Artist	Length
1.	"Never"	Han Joon, Park Se-jun	Park Se-jun, Han Gil, D&T, LAVISS	Golden Child (Y, Seungmin)	3:25
2.	"Never" (Inst.)		Park Se-jun, Han Gil, D&T, LAVISS		3:25
Total length:					6:50

Part 4

Released on March 8, 2019
No.	Title	Lyrics	Music	Artist	Length
1.	"Shalala" (샤랄라)	Han Joon, Park Se-jun	Lee Yoo-jin, Park Se-jun	S.I.S	3:17
2.	"Shalala" (Inst.)		Lee Yoo-jin, Park Se-jun		3:17
Total length:					6:34

Part 5

Released on March 15, 2019
No.	Title	Lyrics	Music	Artist	Length
1.	"Mr. Wonder"	TAIBIAN	TAIBIAN, Bark	Hyojung, Binnie (Oh My Girl)	3:48
2.	"Mr. Wonder" (Inst.)		TAIBIAN, Bark		3:48
Total length:					7:36

Part 6

Released on March 22, 2019
No.	Title	Lyrics	Music	Artist	Length
1.	"Make A Dream" (꿈을 그린다)	Han Joon, Park Se-jun	Seo Jae-ha, Park Se-jun	Hongbin (VIXX)	3:43
2.	"Make A Dream" (Inst.)		Seo Jae-ha, Park Se-jun		3:43
Total length:					7:26

== Viewership ==
Legal High : South Korea viewers per episode (thousands)

Season	Episode number																Average
Season	1	2	3	4	5	6	7	8	9	10	11	12	13	14	15	16	Average
1	377	433	263	315	303	350	317	265	238	264	284	310	271	218	285	285	299

Source: Audience measurement performed nationwide by Nielsen Korea.

Average TV viewership ratings
Ep.	Original broadcast date	Average audience share (Nielsen Korea)	
Ep.	Original broadcast date	Nationwide	Seoul
1	February 8, 2019	3.266%	3.738%
2	February 9, 2019	3.038%	3.396%
3	February 15, 2019	2.762%	2.892%
4	February 16, 2019	2.497%	2.821%
5	February 22, 2019	2.804%	2.815%
6	February 23, 2019	2.666%	2.944%
7	March 1, 2019	2.253%	N/A
8	March 2, 2019	2.115%	2.305%
9	March 8, 2019	2.218%	2.579%
10	March 9, 2019	2.418%	2.632%
11	March 15, 2019	2.340%	N/A
12	March 16, 2019	2.515%	2.563%
13	March 22, 2019	2.366%	N/A
14	March 23, 2019	2.031%	N/A
15	March 29, 2019	2.230%	N/A
16	March 30, 2019	2.632%	2.578%
Average		2.509%	— (Note: Due to some unpublished ratings, the exact average rating is unknown.)
In the table above, the blue numbers represent the lowest ratings and the red numbers represent the highest ratings.; N/A denotes that the rating is not known.; This series aired on a cable channel/pay TV which normally has a relatively smaller audience compared to free-to-air TV/public broadcasters (KBS, SBS, MBC and EBS).
