= Samsin Halmeoni =

Goddess in Korean mythology

- Goddess of Childbirth and Fate
- Member of Gasin pantheon
- Other names: Samsin Halmae; Samseung Halmang
- Hangul: 삼신할머니
- Venerated in: Muism; Gasin faith
- Affiliation: Gasin
- Major cult centre: Jeju Island
- Abode: Anbang
- Symbol: Samsin Danji
- Gender: Female
- Ethnic group: Koreans

Genealogy
- Children: Samsin Jeseok

Samsin Halmeoni (Korean: 삼신할머니), also called Samsin Halmi (삼신할미), Samseung Halmang (Jejueo: 삼승할망), is the goddess of childbirth and fate in Korean mythology.

== Name ==
Sam means "pregnancy" in Korean, sin means god(dess), halmeoni means grandmother, a title for a venerated ancestor goddess, embodied as a wise crone goddess. When addressed with the honorary title Samsin halmeoni or just Samsin, the pregnancy goddesses are also thought of as goddess of childbirth in Korean shamanism. Since sam's phonetic notation is 三 (meaning three), it is also interpreted as triple goddesses in relation to the number 3. A mountain in South Korea is named after Samsin Halmeoni: Samsinbong.

== Worship and beliefs ==
Samsin halmeoni would protect every child from birth until the seventh year of age, where the child would then be protected by Chilseongsin, the Ursa Major bear.

Every village and every house would have its own Samsin of childbirth. Even today, the Korean people believe that the warmest part of the anbang (main living room), belongs to Samsin halmeoni and rituals and prayers to Samsin are still performed there.

Samsin halmeoni was honoured at childbirth and at birthday parties with offerings of rice, soy sauce and wine, laid out in the form of a dinner.

At the third and seventh day after the childbirth, the underwear of the mother would be folded and placed in the anbang Samsin area and a little altar would be set upon them, where prayers for a long and healthy life of the child would be performed.

Samsin halmeoni or Samsin was also said to visit the Samsin Danji (삼신단지) dedicated to her, an earthenware pot kept in the inner wing of the house or in the warm part of the anbang. The pot was filled with rice, then covered in paper and sealed with a knot tied counterclockwise. However, some households would perform Geongung Samsin, the act of honoring Samsin, only in the mind. Samshin halmeoni was honored with Jesas at every festival or birthday celebration in the household, and also at the third, seventh and thirty-seventh day after delivery.

When a woman in the household was pregnant or has given delivery, the room where the Samsin Danji was kept, would be sealed with ropes to symbolize and contain the strong power of Samshin halmeoni. After the delivery, a rope would be also hung on the outside of the house to mark the lucky event of "opening what has been tied", symbolizing the act of birth, and to ward off evil spirits that could threaten the mother and the new baby. The belief in Samsin halmeoni is strongest in Jeju Island.

To conceive, a childless woman would share her Samsin rice meal with a mother who recently delivered, pray to Samsin in the anbang area or wear a cloth that has touched a coffin.

== Myth ==
In oral tradition, Samsin halmeoni would be the daughter of the virgin sky goddess who became the first mudang shamaness, who was named T'ang Kum Agassi or Tanggum Aeggi. She descended from heaven to Earth and gave birth to the Samsin in a cave, which is a reference to bear worship and Korean shamanism. Later, after male-oriented Buddhism has entered Korea, the myth was amended with Tanggum Aeggi also giving birth to 3 sons, who became Buddhistic heaven gods.

The Samsin halmeoni then created and gave birth to the first humans on Earth, becoming the mother goddesses and ancestors of all humans.

In a Samsin myth, both of the main characters - the malevolent Princess of the Dragon Palace of the East Sea and the kind Princess of the Kingdom of Myeongjin - are female, underlining how the ancient myth is related to female-oriented Korean shamanism.

== In popular culture ==
- Portrayed in a cameo appearance by Kim Ji-young (actress, born 1938) in the 2010 SBS TV series My Girlfriend Is a Gumiho
- Portrayed in a cameo appearance by Kim Soo-Mi in the 2012 KBS2 Monday-Tuesday TV series Ohlala Couple.
- Portrayed by Lee El in the 2016–2017 tvN Friday-Saturday TV series Goblin.
- Portrayed by Oh Young-sil in the 2020 JTBC Wednesday-Thursday TV series Mystic Pop-up Bar.
- Portrayed by Moon Sook in the 2021 SBS Monday-Tuesday TV series Lovers of the Red Sky.
- Portrayed by Song Ok-sook in the 2022 MBC TV series The Golden Spoon.
- Portrayed by 3 women in chapter 2 of the KakaoPage manhwa Afterlife Restaurant by ASSAM, Orang, Hwajeong, Hyeong Sangjun
