= HALO (South Korean group) =

South Korean boy band

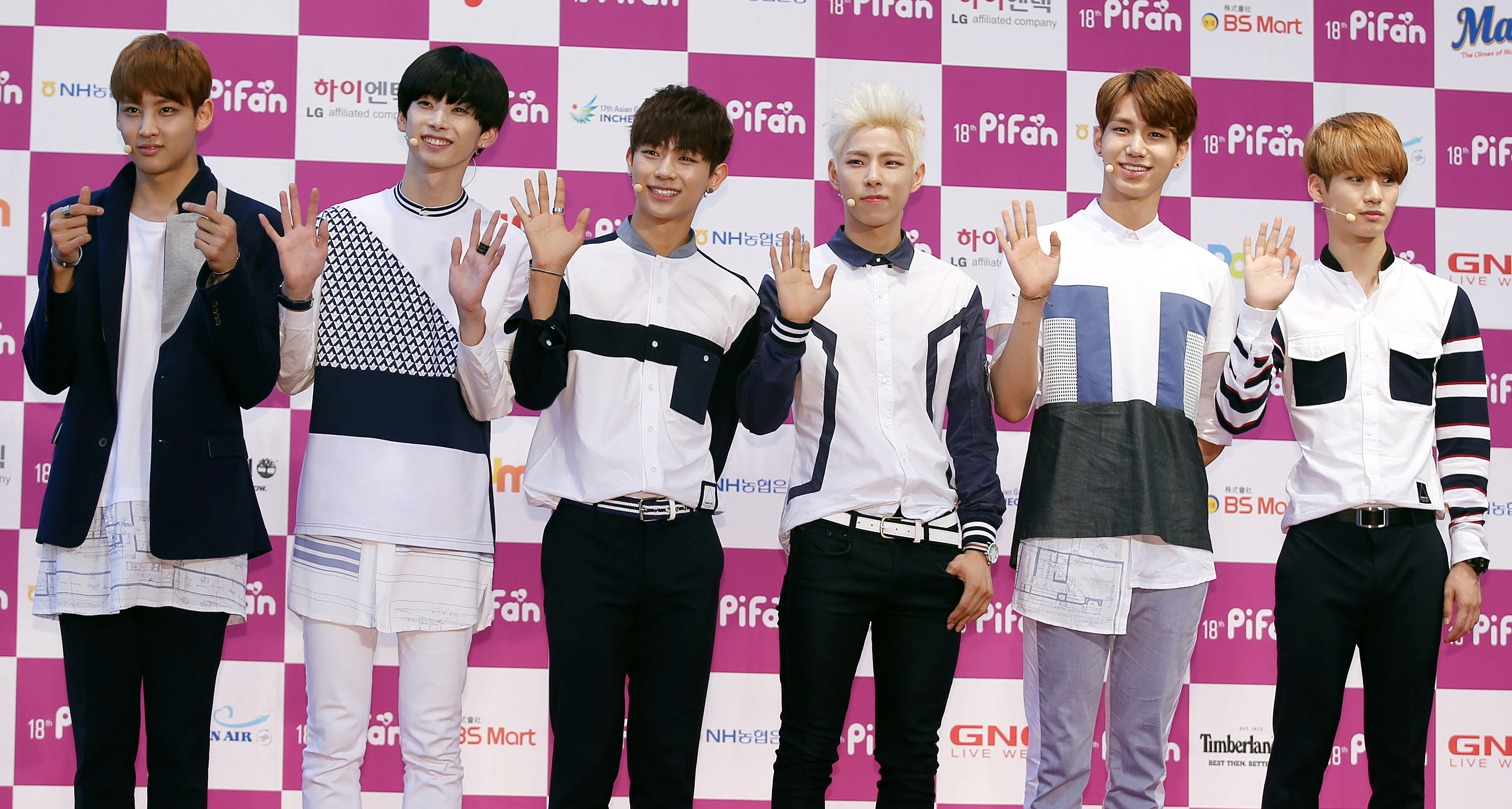
- HALO at the Bucheon International Fantastic Film Festival in 2014

Background information
- Also known as: Hexagon of Absolute Light and Organization
- Origin: Seoul, South Korea
- Genres: K-pop
- Years active: 2014–2019
- Labels: Histar Entertainment
- Members: Dino; Inhaeng; Ooon; Jaeyong; Heecheon; Yoondong

HALO (Korean: 헤일로; abbreviation for Hexagon of Absolute Light and Organization) was a South Korean boy band formed by Histar Entertainment in Seoul, South Korea. The group consisted of six members: Dino, Inhaeng, Ooon, Jaeyong, Heecheon and Yoondong. They debuted on June 26, 2014, with the single "Fever". The group later disbanded on May 8, 2019.

== History ==
On May 8, 2019, HALO's contract with Histar Entertainment ended. Following the news, Heecheon, Youndoung, and Ooon (under his real name, Jeong Young-hoon) became participants in the reality competition series Produce 101 Japan. However, all members left the show prior to its finale, citing personal reasons.

== Members ==
- Dino (디노)
- Inhaeng (인행)
- Ooon (오운)
- Jaeyong (재용)
- Heecheon (희천)
- Yoondong (윤동)

== Discography ==
=== Studio albums ===
Title	Album details	Peak chart positions	Sales
Title	Album details	JPN	Sales
Japanese
HALO no Fushigi na Restaurant (HALOの不思議なレストラン)	Released: September 6, 2017; Label: Histar Entertainment, Pony Canyon; Formats: CD, digital download; Track listing: 1. "Jasmine"; 2. "Heaven Heaven"; 3. "Fever (Japanese ver.)" 4. "Mariya (Japanese ver.)" 5. "Good Feeling (Japanese ver.)" 6. "Boku-tachi, Hare" (僕たち、晴れ); 7. "Come On Now (Japanese ver.)" 8. "Milk" (ミルク) (Hee Cheon Solo); 9. "Fortune Cookie" (フォーチュン・クッキー) (In Haeng Solo); 10. "Onion Soup" (オニオンスープ) (Yoon Dong Solo); 11. "Ice Cream Syndrome" (アイスクリームシンドローム) (Jae Yong Solo); 12. "Sai Ai" (最愛) (Dino Solo); 13. "Himawari no Yakusoku" (ひまわりの約束) (Ooon Solo) (Original by Motohiro Hata)	57	JPN: 1,117

=== Extended plays ===
Title	Album details	Peak chart positions	Sales
Title	Album details	KOR	Sales
Korean
Young Love	Released: December 3, 2015; Label: Histar Entertainment, Interpark; Formats: CD, digital download; Track listing: 1. Feels Good (느낌이 좋아); 2. Unexpected Fortune (뜻밖에 행운이야); 3. I Wanna Hold Your Hand; 4. Sleepless (잠이 안오네); 5. Give Happiness (행복하게 해줄게)	14	KOR: 4,136+
Happy Day	Released: September 2, 2016; Label: Histar Entertainment, Interpark; Formats: CD, digital download; Track listing: 1. Popcorn (팝콘); 2. Mariya (마리야); 3. Shoot Away (싹 다 버려); 4. Yours (네 편); 5. Our Sunny (우리, 맑음)	14	KOR: 2,446+
Here I Am	Released: July 6, 2017; Label: Histar Entertainment, Interpark; Formats: CD, digital download; Track listing: 1. Here I Am (여기여기); 2. Flying; 3. I'm Scared (겁이 나); 4. Traveling Boy (여행소년 / 旅行少年); 5. Here I Am (여기여기) inst.	16	KOR: 2,427+

=== Single albums ===
Title	Album details	Peak chart positions		Sales
Title	Album details	KOR	JPN	Sales
Korean
38°C	Released: June 26, 2014; Label: Histar Entertainment, LOEN Entertainment; Formats: CD, digital download; Track listing: 1. Do You Hear Me (들리니); 2. Fever (체온이 뜨거워); 3. Something Pretty Bad (이쁜게 죄야); 4. Go Away	17	—	KOR: 6,465+
Hello HALO	Released: November 20, 2014; Label: Histar Entertainment, LOEN Entertainment; Formats: CD, digital download; Track listing: 1. Hello HALO; 2. Come On Now (어서 이라온now); 3. California (캘리포니아); 4. 3 Minutes Of Play (3분만 놀자!)	6	—	KOR: 8,701+
Grow Up	Released: May 28, 2015; Label: Histar Entertainment, Interpark; Formats: CD, digital download; Track listing: 1. While You’re Sleeping (니가 잠든 사이에); 2. Nothing On You (손가락 걸고); 3. Sparkly (눈부셔); 4. While You Were Sleeping (니가 잠든 사이에) remix 5. While You Were Sleeping (니가 잠든 사이에) inst.	11	—	KOR: 5,985+

=== Singles ===
Title	Year	Peak chart positions		Sales	Album
Title	Year	KOR	JPN	Sales	Album
Korean
"Fever" (체온 뜨거워)	2014	—	—	—	38°C
"Come On Now" (어서이리온now)	2014	—	—	—	Hello HALO
"Surprise" (서프라이즈)	2015	—	—	—	Non-album single
"While You're Sleeping" (니가 잠든 사이에)	2015	—	—	—	Grow Up
"Feels Good" (느낌이 좋아)	2015	—	—	—	Young Love
"Mariya" (마리야)	2016	—	—	—	Happy Day
"Here I Am" (여기여기)	2017	—	—	—	Here I Am
"O.M.G."	2018	—	—	—	Non-album single
Japanese
"Fever (Japanese ver.)"	2015	—		—	HALO no Fushigi na Restaurant
"Heaven Heaven"	2016	—	50	JPN: 1,405	HALO no Fushigi na Restaurant
"Jasmine"	2017	—	20	JPN: 2,953	HALO no Fushigi na Restaurant
"Liar"	2018	—	41	JPN: 1,779	Non-album single
"—" denotes releases that did not chart or not released in that region.

== Tours ==
- HALO European Tour 2018 "Here I Am"
