= Fists of Legend =

2013 film by Kang Woo-suk

- Theatrical release poster
- Hangul: 전설의 주먹
- Hanja: 傳說의 주먹
- RR: Jeonseorui jumeok
- MR: Chŏnsŏrŭi chumŏk
- Directed by: Kang Woo-suk
- Written by: Jang Min-seok
- Based on: Legend Punch by Lee Jong-gyu
- Produced by: Jung Sun-young; Son Jeong-woo
- Starring: Hwang Jung-min; Yoo Jun-sang; Lee Yo-won; Yoon Je-moon; Jung Woong-in
- Cinematography: Kim Yong-heung; Lee Bong-joo
- Edited by: Ko Im-pyo
- Music by: Jo Yeong-wook
- Production companies: Cinema Service; MTV Films; Comedy Central Films
- Distributed by: CJ Entertainment
- Release dates: April 10, 2013 (South Korea and United States)
- Running time: 153 minutes
- Countries: South Korea; United States
- Languages: Korean; English
- Box office: US$12 million

Fists of Legend (Korean: 전설의 주먹; RR: Jeonseorui jumeok) is a 2013 action drama and comedy film directed by Kang Woo-suk. It is based on the popular webtoon of the same title written by Lee Jong-gyu and illustrated by Lee Yoon-gyun. The film stars Hwang Jung-min, Yoo Jun-sang, Lee Yo-won, Yoon Je-moon, and Jung Woong-in.

== Plot ==
A moment of bad luck derailed Deok-kyu's Olympic dreams and led him and his friends to jail. Jin-ho got out of jail quickly because of his rich parents, but Deok-kyu, Jae-seok, and Sang-hoon were not so lucky.

Years later, while running a noodle shop to earn extra money following an accident involving his daughter, Deok-kyu accepts an invitation to join a televised mixed martial arts tournament, Fists of Legend. A group of middle-aged men who used to be called "legends" during their teenage high school days take part in the "real action fighting" reality show, and the winner gets a prize of ₩20 million every round, for a total of ₩200 million (US$183,823). Among the contestants are Deok-kyu's old friends Sang-hoon, currently a manager at a large company who lacks in self-respect after getting passed over for a promotion, and Jae-seok, now a good-for-nothing guy who dreams of becoming a somebody.

== Cast ==
- Hwang Jung-min as Im Deok-kyu
  - Park Jeong-min as young Deok-kyu
- Yoo Jun-sang as Lee Sang-hoon
  - Gu Won as young Sang-hoon
- Yoon Je-moon as Shin Jae-seok
  - Park Doo-shik as young Jae-seok
- Lee Yo-won as Hong Gyu-min
- Jung Woong-in as Son Jin-ho
  - Lee Jung-hyuk as young Jin-ho
- Sung Ji-ru as Seo Kang-gook
- Ji Woo as Im Soo-bin
- Kang Shin-il as Director Jo
- Kang Sung-jin as Announcer
- Kwon Hyun-sang as Author
- Choi Hyo-eun as Eun-soo
- Kwon Eun-soo as Writer Kwon
- Kim Jae-yong as Writer Jae

== Production ==
Filming began on July 15, 2012 at the Shin Joon-sub boxing gym in Namwon, North Jeolla Province, and wrapped on November 28, 2012 in Paju.

Actor Yoo Jun-sang injured the cruciate ligament in his left knee while filming and underwent surgery on October 30, 2012.

== Awards and nominations ==
2013 50th Grand Bell Awards

- Nomination - Best Actor - Hwang Jung-min
- Nomination - Best Supporting Actor - Yoo Jun-sang
- Nomination - Best New Actor - Park Doo-shik
- Nomination - Best New Actor - Park Jung-min
- Nomination - Best Lighting - Kang Dae-hee
