= Lovers of the Red Sky =

2021 South Korean television series

- Promotional poster
- Also known as: Hong Chun-gi; Red Sky
- Hangul: 홍천기
- Hanja: 紅天機
- RR: Hongcheongi
- MR: Hongch'ŏn'gi
- Genre: Historical; Romance; Fantasy
- Created by: Studio S VIU (production investment)
- Based on: Hong Chun-gi by Jung Eun-gwol
- Written by: Ha Eun
- Directed by: Jang Tae-yoo
- Starring: Kim You-jung; Ahn Hyo-seop; Gong Myung; Kwak Si-yang
- Music by: Music Director; Jeon Chang-yeop
- Country of origin: South Korea
- Original language: Korean
- No. of episodes: 16

Production
- Executive producers: Cho Seung-hoon (CP); Hong Sung-chang
- Producers: Han Jeong-hwan; Lee Gwang-soon; Seo Gyun
- Cinematography: Hwang Chang-in; Shin Jae-hyun
- Camera setup: Single Camera
- Running time: 70 minutes
- Production companies: Studio S Studio Taeyou

Original release
- Network: SBS TV
- Release: August 30 – October 26, 2021

Lovers of the Red Sky (Korean: 홍천기; RR: Hongcheongi) is a 2021 South Korean television series starring Kim You-jung, Ahn Hyo-seop, Gong Myung, and Kwak Si-yang. It is directed by Jang Tae-yoo and written by Ha Eun. The series adapted from the novel of the same name written by Jung Eun-gwol is a fantasy romance historical drama about the only female painter in fictional era Dan dynasty, who was briefly recorded in the historical records.

It premiered on SBS TV on August 30, 2021, and aired every Monday and Tuesday at 22:00 (KST) for 16 episodes.

== Synopsis ==
Set during the Dan dynasty era when ghosts, demons and gods are involved in human life, the story recounts the fateful relationship of a female painter (Kim You-jung) and a blind astrologer (Ahn Hyo-seop). It begins at the sealing ceremony conducted at the 3rd year of King Seongjo's rule where they try to extract Ma Wang (Demon King: god of Death), who is residing in former King Yeongjong's body, and seal it inside a portrait of the King painted by a divine painter. Though they manage to seal the Demon King successfully with the help of Samshin (goddesses of Life), the Demon King places a curse on the country that it will suffer from droughts and famine for years to come. He also curses the offspring of Ha Seong-jin (the officer who conducted the sealing ceremony) and Hong Eun-ho (the painter of the King's portrait). Both Ha Seong-jin's son, Ha Ram, and Hong Eun-ho's daughter, Hong Cheon-gi, are born on that very day. Cheon-gi is born blind due to the curse of Demon King.

Nine years later, the country has been suffering from severe drought and the royal shaman is preparing for the Dragon Rain Making Ritual. Ha Ram, as a child born with the energy of water, is noticed by her and she chooses him as the helper of rain making ritual. As they come to the capital to attend the ritual, Ha Ram meets blind Hong Cheon-gi who lives with her father, who had lost his sanity after the sealing ceremony. The two children make memories with each other and promise to meet again after the rain ritual. But, unexpected things happen at the ritual. The King's portrait in which the Demon King is sealed gets burned and the Demon King enters Ha Ram's body. Ha Ram who was sacrificed in order to make rain, comes back to life with his sight lost while Cheon-gi miraculously gains her sight since Samshin takes the Demon King's eyes and leaves them with Cheon-gi.

19 years later Hong Cheon-gi is now a talented painter at Baek-yoo Painting Group and the only female painter of that time. She copies valuable paintings to make money for her father's medicine. Ha Ram has become an astrologer at Seo Mung Wan, a government office in charge of astronomy, weather, and calendar. He is capable of predicting the future by tracing the movement of stars. Simultaneously, he lives a disguised life as Il Wol Seong, the chief of information organization Wol Seong Dang, in order to take revenge on the royal family who had destroyed his family 19 years ago.

After Hong Cheon-gi and Ha Ram reunite, they fall for each other, but the duo is sucked into the machinations of the royal court, particularly those involving two princes: the free-spirited Prince Yangmyeong (Gong Myung) and the cruel, scheming Prince Juhyang (Kwak Si-yang) – a man who longs to become the next king. Their relationship is further disturbed because one of them (Ha Ram) is possessed by the Demon and the other one (Hong Cheon-gi) is the divine painter tasked with making the vessel in which the Demon must be sealed.

== Cast ==
=== Main ===
- Kim You-jung as Hong Cheon-gi
  - Lee Nam-kyung as young Hong Cheon-gi

A genius painter with divine power; she was born blind due to the curse of the Demon King, but her eyesight was miraculously restored by Samshin's blessing. She takes care of her mentally ill father and copies valuable paintings to buy his medicine.

- Ahn Hyo-seop as Ha Ram (Ilwolseong)
  - Choi Seung-hoon as young Ha Ram

A red-eyed man who lost his sight due to a mysterious accident while attending a rain-making ritual in his childhood. He survived due to the power of the Demon King, and lives a new life as an astrologer, while preparing to take revenge on the royal family, since they are responsible for making his life miserable.

- Gong Myung as Grand Prince Yangmyeong (Yi Yul)
  - Kim Jung-cheol as young Grand Prince Yangmyeong

The third son of King Seongjo, a leisurely prince who is known to be an expert at painting, calligraphy and poetry. He seems to have a free spirit that is full of romantic qualities, but also has a deep sense of loneliness inside.

- Kwak Si-yang as Grand Prince Juhyang (Yi Hu)
  - Park Sang-hoon as young Grand Prince Juhyang

The second son of King Seongjo, a man who wishes for the throne he cannot have. In order to become a powerful king, he wants to become possessed by the Demon King.

=== Supporting ===
==== People around Hong Cheon-gi ====
- Choi Kwang-il as Hong Eun-ho

Hong Cheon-gi's father, a former painter at Gohwawon (Royal Painting Bureau) who lost consciousness during a major event 19 years ago.

- Kim Kwang-kyu as Choi Won-ho

Head Master of Beak-yoo Painting Society who takes care of Hong Cheon-gi as if she were his own daughter.

- Yoon Sa-bong as Kyun-ju

The person in charge of housekeeping of the Baek-yoo Painting Group. She treats Hong Cheon-gi like her daughter.

- Hong Kyung as Choi Jung

He is the most famous painter in Gohwawon and has a talent for painting portraits.

- Hong Jin-ki as Cha Young-wook

Cheon-gi's best friend and fellow painter at Baek-yoo Painting Group

==== People around Ha Ram ====
- Kim Hyun-mok as Mansoo

Ha Ram's servant

- Song Won-seok as Moo-yeong

Ha Ram's escort warrior who understands martial arts. He follows him like a shadow, protecting Ha Ram with the grace he received from him in the past.

- Ha Yu-li as Mae-hyang

A gisaeng who helps Ilwolseong of Wolseongdang.

==== People allied with Prince Yangmyeong ====
- Jo Sung-ha as King Seongjo

The 4th King of the Dan Dynasty

- Ko Kyu-pil as Go Pil

Prince Yangmyeong's servant

- Jang Hyun-sung as Han Geon

A master of landscape and scenery painting and an expert at Gohwawon.

- Kim Joo-young as Lee Hyun-mo

A government official and Prince Yangmyeong's ally.

==== People allied with Prince Juhyang ====
- Chae Kook-hee as Mi-su

She was once the chief royal shaman and Seongjucheong's 4th head priestess, but got banished from the palace and now works for prince Juhyang.

- Jung Dong-geun as Ahn Young-hoe

Prince Juhyang's adviser.

- Cha Ji-hyuk as Prince Juhyang's escort warrior

==== Gods and Deities ====
- Moon Sook as Samshin

The goddess of life, who protects Ha Ram and Hong Cheon-gi.

- Jo Ye-rin as Ho Ryeong

The Tiger Spirit of Inwangsan, the guardian deity of the King's Palace.

- Park Jung-hak as Gan Yun-guk/Hwacha

Former Gohwawon expert who got possessed by Hwacha, a goblin who lives on the energy of paintings.

==== Others ====
- Kim Geum-soon as Wol-seon

Current chief royal shaman, Seongjucheong's 5th head priestess

- Jang Won-hyung as Shim Dae-yu

A mysterious painter who always wears a bamboo hat, thus getting the name "Shim with bamboo hat".

- Kwak Hyeon-jun as Kang Hee-yeon

A painter from a wealthy aristocratic family.

=== Special appearance ===
- Han Sang-jin as Ha Seong-jin, Ha-ram's father, former chief officer of the Martial.
- Jeon Guk-hwan as King Yeongjong, the 3rd King of Dan Dynasty
- Kim Beob-rae as Ma Wang: the Demon King (voice appearance)
- Choi Jong-won as Ha Dam (Ep 11–12, 14–15)

A mysterious prisoner at stone prison, later revealed to be Ha Ram's grandfather.

== Production ==
- Originally, Park Yong-soon (director of Secret Mother) would direct the series.
- The first script reading of the cast was held in November 2020. On July 8, 2021, the site photos of script reading were released by the production.

== Original soundtrack ==
Lovers of the Red Sky

Soundtrack album by Various Artists
- Released: 2021
- Genre: Soundtrack
- Languages: Korean; English
- Labels: Kakao; SBS Contents Hub; Music Recipe

=== Part 1 ===
Released on August 31, 2021
No.	Title	Lyrics	Music	Artist	Length
1.	"Is It Me?" (나인가요)	Zeenan; OneTop; J.SEASON	Zeenan; OneTop; J.SEASON	Baekhyun	4:08
2.	"Is It Me?" (Inst.)		Zeenan; OneTop; J.SEASON		4:08
Total length:					8:16

=== Part 2 ===
Released on September 6, 2021
No.	Title	Lyrics	Music	Artist	Length
1.	"Always, be with you" (나는 그대고 그대는 나였다)	Kim Chang-rak; Kim Soo-bin (AIMING); J.SEASON	Kim Chang-rak; Kim Soo-bin (AIMING); Kwon Soo-hyun	Solar (Mamamoo)	3:35
2.	"Always, be with you" (Inst.)		Kim Chang-rak; Kim Soo-bin (AIMING); Kwon Soo-hyun		3:34
Total length:					7:10

=== Part 3 ===
Released on September 13, 2021
No.	Title	Lyrics	Music	Artist	Length
1.	"You & I" (그대와 나)	Zeenan; Spacecowboy (Park Sung-jin); J.SEASON	Zeenan; Spacecowboy (Park Sung-jin); J.SEASON	Yang Da-il	4:28
2.	"You & I" (Inst.)		Zeenan; Spacecowboy (Park Sung-jin); J.SEASON		4:29
Total length:					8:57

=== Part 4 ===
Released on September 27, 2021
No.	Title	Lyrics	Music	Artist	Length
1.	"When your tears wet my eyes" (너의 눈물이 나의 눈을 적실 때)	Choi Byung-chang; J.SEASON	J.SEASON; Choi Byung-chang; Kim Hyun-jun	Ailee	3:52
2.	"When your tears wet my eyes" (Inst.)		J.SEASON; Choi Byung-chang; Kim Hyun-jun		3:52
Total length:					7:44

=== Part 5 ===
Released on October 8, 2021
No.	Title	Lyrics	Music	Artist	Length
1.	"As it was a lie" (거짓말처럼)	J.SEASON; Jeon Jun-kyu	J.SEASON; Jeon Jun-kyu	Punch	3:58
2.	"As it was a lie" (Inst.)		J.SEASON; Jeon Jun-kyu		3:58
Total length:					7:56

=== Part 6 ===
Released on October 12, 2021
No.	Title	Lyrics	Music	Artist	Length
1.	"A Long Sleep" (긴 잠)	Zeenan; OneTop; J.SEASON	Zeenan; OneTop; J.SEASON	Lee Soo (MC the Max)	3:58
2.	"A Long Sleep" (Inst.)		Zeenan; OneTop; J.SEASON		3:58
Total length:					7:56

=== Part 7 ===
Released on October 19, 2021
No.	Title	Lyrics	Music	Artist	Length
1.	"Moon with Starry Night" (달과 별의 밤)	J.SEASON; Yoon Jin-hyo	J.SEASON; Yoon Jin-hyo	Jeong Hyo-bean	4:08
2.	"Moon with Starry Night" (Inst.)		J.SEASON; Yoon Jin-hyo		4:08
Total length:					8:16

=== Part 8 ===
Released on October 25, 2021
No.	Title	Music	Artist	Length
1.	"Rabbit and Liver" (토끼와 간)	J.SEASON; Choi Byung-chang; Kim Hyun-Jun	Cho Cheong-gyu	3:12
2.	"Rabbit and Liver" (Inst.)	J.SEASON; Choi Byung-chang; Kim Hyun-Jun		3:13
Total length:				6:25

== Viewership ==
Lovers of the Red Sky : South Korea viewers per episode (millions)

Season	Episode number																Average
Season	1	2	3	4	5	6	7	8	9	10	11	12	13	14	15	16	Average
1	1.189	1.519	1.416	1.722	1.786	1.865	1.686	1.578	1.809	1.584	1.625	1.599	1.593	1.618	1.752	1.832	1.636

Source: Audience measurement performed nationwide by Nielsen Korea.

Average TV viewership ratings
Ep.	Broadcast date	Title	Average audience share		
Ep.	Broadcast date	Title	Nielsen Korea		TNmS
Ep.	Broadcast date	Title	Nationwide	Seoul	Nationwide
1	August 30, 2021	The Red Sky (붉은 하늘)	6.6% (10th)	6.4% (8th)	6.8% (10th)
2	August 31, 2021	The Divine Artist (신령한 화공)	8.8% (5th)	8.5% (5th)	7.2% (9th)
3	September 6, 2021	The Demon (마왕 魔王)	8.0% (7th)	7.4% (6th)	7.4% (7th)
4	September 7, 2021	The Red Thread of Fate (운명의 붉은 실)	9.6% (4th)	9.1% (4th)	8.4% (6th)
5	September 13, 2021	Maejukheon Painting Contest, Part 1 (매죽헌 화회 上)	9.7% (5th)	9.5% (4th)	7.8% (7th)
6	September 14, 2021	Maejukheon Painting Contest, Part 2 (매죽헌 화회 下)	10.2% (5th)	10.3% (4th)	8.6% (5th)
7	September 27, 2021	Reunion (재회)	9.3% (5th)	8.9% (4th)	7.9% (8th)
8	September 28, 2021	The Burned King's Portrait (불에 탄 왕의 초상)	8.9% (5th)	8.7% (4th)	7.7% (6th)
9	October 4, 2021	Physiognomy of The Immortal (불멸의 관상)	9.6% (4th)	9.3% (4th)	7.4% (7th)
10	October 5, 2021	The Painter of The King's Portrait (어용화사)	8.5% (5th)	8.2% (4th)	7.7% (6th)
11	October 11, 2021	The Ring of Fate (운명의 가락지)	8.8% (6th)	8.4% (5th)	7.1% (9th)
12	October 12, 2021	Fight To The Death (수사전 殊死戰)	8.8% (5th)	8.4% (4th)	7.6% (7th)
13	October 18, 2021	The Sealing Ceremony (봉인식 封印式)	8.9% (5th)	8.9% (4th)	8.2% (6th)
14	October 19, 2021	From the Jaws of Death (절처봉생 絶處逢生)	9.3% (5th)	9.0% (4th)	7.9% (7th)
15	October 25, 2021	To Observe the Planets (추보 推步)	8.9% (5th)	8.1% (4th)	7.7% (7th)
16	October 26, 2021	Lovers of the Red Sky (붉은 하늘의 연인)	10.4% (3rd)	10.0% (3rd)	8.6 (6th)
Average			9.02%	8.69%	7.75%
In the table above, the blue numbers represent the lowest ratings and the red numbers represent the highest ratings.; NR denotes that the series did not rank in the top 20 daily programs on that date.; N/A denotes that the rating is not known.

== International broadcast ==
In Southeast Asia and Hong Kong, the drama was broadcast on Viu as Viu Original series, premiered simultaneously with Korean broadcast.

In Japan, the drama was broadcast on KNTV from February 19, 2022.

In Taiwan, it was broadcast on GTV from April 11, 2022.

== Awards and nominations ==
Year	Award	Category	Recipient	Result	Ref.
2021	SBS Drama Awards	Best Couple Award	Ahn Hyo-seop & Kim You-jung	Won	
2021	SBS Drama Awards	Scene Stealer Award	Jo Ye-rin	Nominated	
2021	SBS Drama Awards	Best Supporting Actor	Jo Sung-ha	Nominated	
2021	SBS Drama Awards	Best Supporting Actress	Moon Sook	Nominated	
2021	SBS Drama Awards	Excellence Award, Actor in a Miniseries Genre/Fantasy Drama	Ahn Hyo-seop	Won	
2021	SBS Drama Awards	Excellence Award, Actor in a Miniseries Genre/Fantasy Drama	Gong Myung	Nominated	
2021	SBS Drama Awards	Best Character Award, Actor	Kwak Si-yang	Won	
2021	SBS Drama Awards	Top Excellence Award, Actress in a Miniseries Genre/Fantasy Drama	Kim You-jung	Won	
2022	55th WorldFest-Houston International Film Festival	Gold Remi Award – Drama	Lovers of the Red Sky	Won	
