= Love with Flaws =

2019 South Korean television series

- Hangul: 하자있는 인간들
- Lit.: People with Flaws
- RR: Hajainneun ingandeul
- MR: Hajainnŭn in'gandŭl
- Genre: Romantic comedy
- Developed by: Son Hyung-seok
- Written by: Ahn Shin-yoo
- Directed by: Oh Jin-seok
- Starring: Oh Yeon-seo; Ahn Jae-hyun; Kim Seul-gi; Gu Won; Heo Jung-min
- Country of origin: South Korea
- Original language: Korean
- No. of episodes: 32 (Note: In order to circumvent Korean laws that prevent commercial breaks in the middle of an episode, what would previously have been aired as single 70 minute episodes are now being repackaged as two 35 minute episodes, with two episodes being shown each night with a commercial break between the two.)

Production
- Executive producer: Lee Sang-baek
- Running time: 35 minutes
- Production company: AStory

Original release
- Network: MBC
- Release: November 27, 2019 – January 16, 2020

Love with Flaws (Korean: 하자있는 인간들) is a 2019 South Korean television series starring Oh Yeon-seo, Ahn Jae-hyun, Kim Seul-gi, Gu Won, and Heo Jung-min. Produced by AStory, it aired on MBC on Wednesdays and Thursdays at 21:00 (KST) from November 27, 2019, to January 16, 2020.

== Synopsis ==
This is a romantic comedy story about two imperfect people who fall in love with each other. The female protagonist, Joo Seo-yeon, hates men with pretty faces. Based on her experience of growing up with her three good looking brothers, she believes that good looking men are nothing but trouble. The male protagonist, Lee Kang-woo, initially has misconceptions about her.

== Cast ==
=== Main ===
- Oh Yeon-seo as Joo Seo-yeon
- Ahn Jae-hyun as Lee Kang-woo
- Kim Seul-gi as Kim Mi-kyung
- Gu Won as Lee Min-hyuk
- Heo Jung-min as Park Hyun-soo

=== Supporting ===
- Min Woo-hyuk as Joo Won-jae
- Cha In-ha as Joo Won-suk
- Kim Jae-yong as Joo Seo-joon
- Hwang Woo-seul-hye as Lee Kang-hee
- Jang Yoo-sang as Choi Ho-dol
- Yoon Hae-young as Ms Oh
- Joo Hae-eun as Lee Joo-hee
- Shin Do-hyun as Baek Jang Mi
- Yoon Da-hoon as Kang-woo's Father
- Kim Young-ok as Chairwoman Han

=== Others ===
- Jeon Soo-kyeong as Baek Jang-mi's mother
- Lee Jung-shik as University student
- Kang Tae-oh as Oh Jung-tae (Seo-yeon's ex-boyfriend)
- Seo Woo-jin as young Joo Seo-joon
- Lee Do-yeop as Joo Seo-yeon's father

== Ratings ==
In this table, the blue numbers represent the lowest ratings and the red numbers represent the highest ratings.

Ep.	Original broadcast date	AGB Nielsen (Nationwide)
1	November 27, 2019	3.2%
2	November 27, 2019	4.0%
3	November 28, 2019	2.2%
4	November 28, 2019	3.0%
5	December 4, 2019	2.5%
6	December 4, 2019	3.0%
7	December 5, 2019	2.3%
8	December 5, 2019	3.4%
9	December 11, 2019	1.9%
10	December 11, 2019	2.7%
11	December 12, 2019	2.5%
12	December 12, 2019	3.0%
13	December 18, 2019	2.4%
14	December 18, 2019	3.7%
15	December 19, 2019	3.3%
16	December 19, 2019	3.1%
17	December 25, 2019	2.1%
18	December 25, 2019	2.7%
19	December 26, 2019	2.2%
20	December 26, 2019	3.0%
21	January 1, 2020	2.8%
22	January 1, 2020	3.0%
23	January 2, 2020	2.3%
24	January 2, 2020	2.7%
25	January 8, 2020	2.0%
26	January 8, 2020	2.5%
27	January 9, 2020	1.9%
28	January 9, 2020	2.6%
29	January 15, 2020	2.1%
30	January 15, 2020	2.5%
31	January 16, 2020	2.3%
32	January 16, 2020	2.9%
Average		2.7%
