= Min Woo-hyuk =

South Korean actor

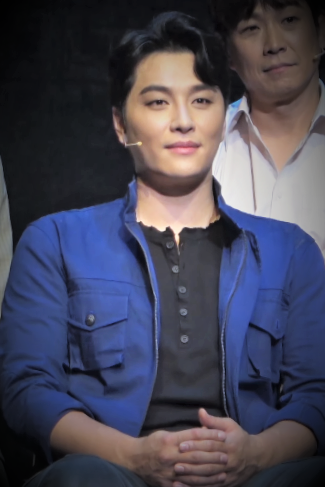
- Min in 2020
- Born: Park Sung-Hyuk; 18 September 1983 (age 43); Seoul, South Korea
- Education: Dongguk University
- Occupations: Actor; singer; model
- Years active: 2011–present
- Spouse: Lee Se-mi (m. 2012)
- Children: 2

Min Woo-hyuk (born September 18, 1983) is a South Korean actor, singer and model. He is best known for his main role in The Third Charm. He is also known for his supporting role in Love with Flaws as Joo Won-jae. He debuted as a musical actor in the musical The March of Youth in 2013, as an actor in OCN's drama Holyland on April 28, 2012, and as a singer on April 23, 2005, with the album titled SUN HA 1st Album.

== Personal life ==
=== Marriage and family ===
Min married actress Lee Se-mi in 2012. They have a son, Park Yi-deun (2015) and a daughter, Park Yi-eum (2020).

== Filmography ==
=== Television series ===
Year	Title	Role	Notes	Ref.
2012	Holy Land	Hwang Seok-goo		
2012	The Thousandth Man	Han Dong-il		
2012	Vampire Prosecutor 2	Kim Jin-ha	Season 2	
2018	The Third Charm	Shin Ho-chul		
2019	Love with Flaws	Joo Won-jae		
2022	If You Wish Upon Me	Pyo Gyu-tae	Cameo (episode 3-5)	
2023	Doctor Cha	Roy Kim		

=== Variety shows ===
Year	Title	Role	Ref.
2016	Video Star: Season 1	Himself	
2016	Life Bar	Himself	
2017	Mr. House Husband: Season 2	House husband	
2018	Happy Together: Season 4	Himself	
2020	The Return of Superman	Himself	
2020	King of Mask Singer	Contestant	
2021–2022	DIMF Musical Star	Judge	

== Theater ==
Year	English title	Korean title	Role	Ref.
2015–2016	Les Misérables	레 미제라블	Enjolras	
2016	Wicked	위키드	Fiyero	
2016	Aida	몬스터	Radames	
2017	Ben-Hur	벤허	Messala	
2018	Anna Karenina	안나 카레니나	Alexei Vronsky	
2018–2022	Frankenstein	프랑켄슈타인	Victor Frankenstein	
2019	Jekyll & Hyde	지킬앤하이드	Dr. Henry Jekyll/Mr. Edward Hyde	
2019	Ben-Hur	벤허	Ben-Hur	
2021	Marie Antoinette	마리 앙투아네트	Axel von Fersen the Younger	
2022	Sandglass	모래시계	Tae-soo	
2022	Crash Landing on You	사랑의 불시착	Ri Jeong-hyuk	
2022–2023	Hero	영웅	Ahn Jung-geun	
2023–2024	Les Misérables	레 미제라블	Jean Valjean	

== Ambassadorship ==
- 11th Daegu International Musical Festival DIMF Ambassador
- Public relations ambassador at the 43rd Golden Photography Awards (2023)
