= Jang Sa-ik =

South Korean singer (born 1949)

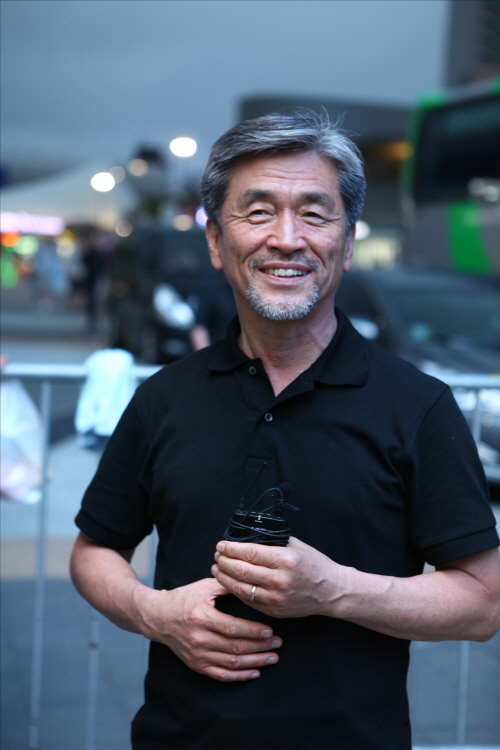

Korean name
- Hangul: 장사익
- Hanja: 張思翼
- RR: Jang Saik
- MR: Chang Saik

Jang Sa-ik (born 1949) is a popular South Korean singer. His music combines elements of popular music, jazz, and Korean traditional music. In particular, the style of pansori can be heard throughout Jang Sa-ik's music.

Jang Sa-ik was born in Gwangcheon-eup, Hongseong, Chungcheongnam-do,

He spent his childhood listening to his father and his uncle playing traditional music on the taepyeongso, a traditional Korean oboe. Spending his childhood in the countryside, he grew to love the sounds of "Nongak", a traditional Korean music form associated with farm life.

Jang Sa Ik spent over 25 years doing odd jobs in various towns across Korea, but he found himself longing for the sounds of his childhood. Finally, in 1980, following in his father's footsteps, he began to study the taepyeongso. He made his debut at the age of 46, at which time he was working as an electronics salesman. In 1993, Jang decide to quit his job as a car center clerk, saying: "After changing jobs more than 10 times, I realized that singing was my true calling."

Shortly after choosing music as his full-time vocation, Jang released his first album, entitled Hareulganeungil ("Passage to Heaven"), featuring pianist Im Dong-Chang. This album reflected the values and lifestyles of the poor Korean population living in the small villages and towns of Korea. During this time, Western pop music was extremely popular in Korea, but Jang's debut album made a huge impact on mainstream Korean music. He began to garner a reputation as a unique and powerful singer. Jang went on to win the Jeonju Daesaseub (a traditional Korean music contest in Jeonju City) in 1994, the same year that his debut album was released.

Having ignited the emotions of the Korean people, Jang Sa Ik continued to release five more highly esteemed albums, and firmly planted himself in the hearts and souls of the Korean people. He had his first performance at the Sejong Center in Seoul in 1996, and since then, has continued to perform at this venue every other year.

Jang Sa Ik brought his musical talents to the United States in 2007, in a concert tour entitled "Longing...". He performed in New York, Chicago, Washington and Los Angeles to very enthusiastic audiences. While the English-speaking could not always understand his words, Jang Sa Ik conveyed a multitude of emotions through his music, and the audience response was strong. Jang believes that music is an international language, and that without using words at all, he can communicate through song.

Jang Sa Ik's music is often a combination of his own compositions and traditional Korean poetry. He often incorporates "kukak", traditional Korean folk songs in his music. His music has been described as "hot and spicy, like garlic".

Jang Sa Ik's importance in Korean music circles is such that he is known to many as "Soriggun", a word meaning Maestro.

At the Closing Ceremony of the 2018 Winter Olympics, he performed the Korean national anthem with a choir of 23 elementary school students.

Typically, often at the end of his concerts, he sings "Arirang".
