= Lee Sang-yoon =

South Korean actor (born 1981)

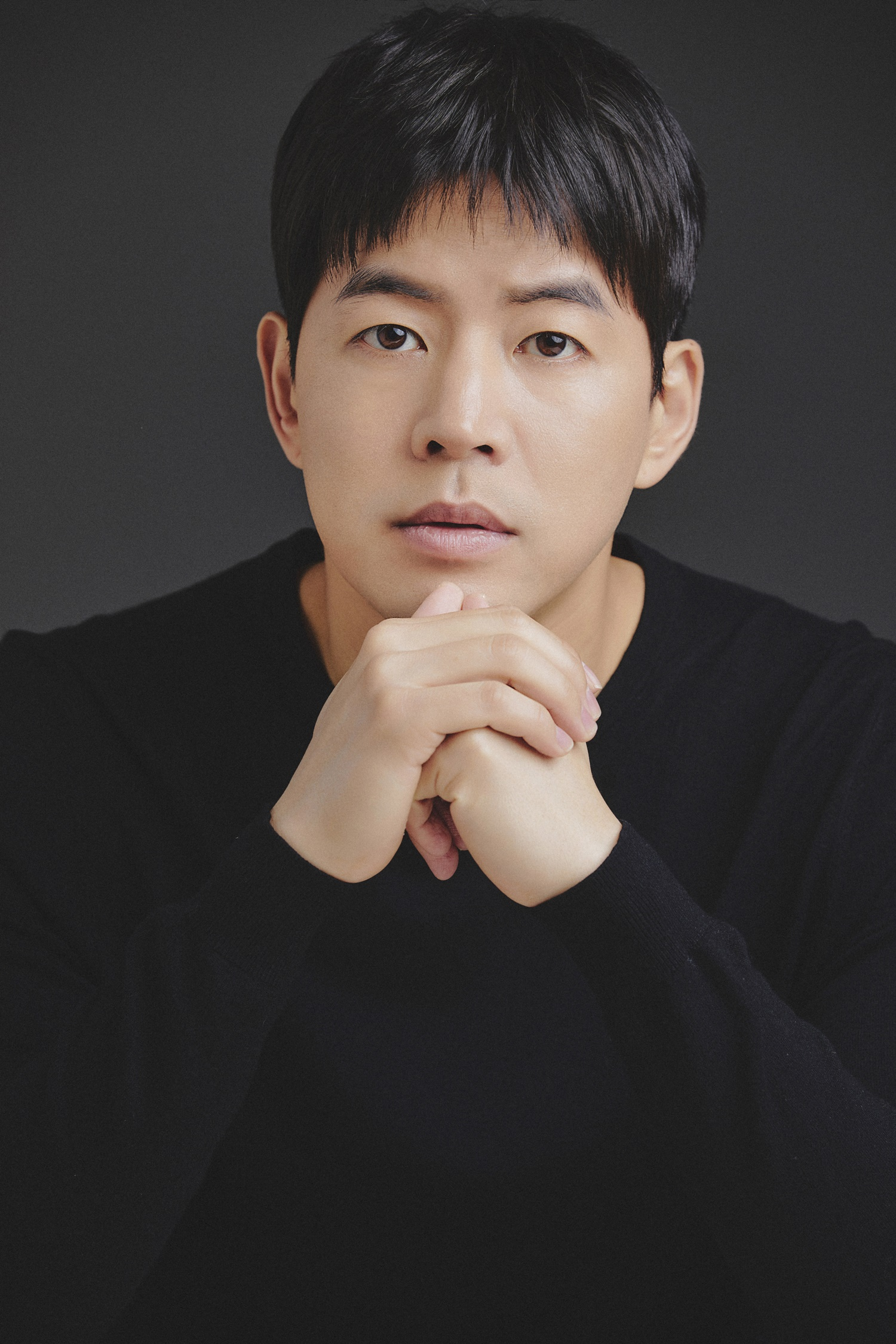
- Lee in 2019
- Born: August 15, 1981 (age 45); Seoul, South Korea
- Education: Seoul National University – Department of Physics
- Occupation: Actor
- Years active: 2004–present
- Agent(s): J,Wide-Company

Korean name
- Hangul: 이상윤
- Hanja: 李相侖
- RR: I Sangyun
- MR: I Sangyun

Lee Sang-yoon (Korean: 이상윤; born August 15, 1981) is a South Korean actor. He is best known for his starring roles in Seoyoung, My Daughter (2012), Angel Eyes (2014), Liar Game (2014), On the Way to the Airport (2016), Whisper (2017), About Time (2018), VIP (2019), and One the Woman (2021).

== Career ==
Lee Sang-yoon was picked out of a crowd on the streets of Yeouido by his former agency director at the age of 24. Making his entertainment debut in 2005 in a Hite Beer commercial, he went on to star in several television series. He won Best New Actor at the 2010 MBC Drama Awards for Home Sweet Home.

Lee earned recognition with his role in the family weekend drama Seoyoung, My Daughter (2012), which recorded a peak viewership rating of 47.6%, making it the highest rated Korean drama of 2013.

Lee returned to the screen with period drama Goddess of Fire, playing Prince Gwanghae.

Lee starred in his first big screen leading role in the 2014 romance film Santa Barbara. The same year, he also played lead roles in the medical drama Angel Eyes and mystery thriller series Liar Game.

In 2015, Lee starred in romantic comedy series Second 20s.

In 2016, Lee starred in romance melodrama On the Way to the Airport. He had his second big screen leading role in the thriller film Insane.

In 2017, Lee starred in SBS' legal drama Whisper, playing an elite judge. In December, Lee confirmed to appear in the variety show Master in the House as a fixed cast member.

In 2018, Lee starred in the fantasy melodrama About Time alongside Lee Sung-kyung.

In 2019, Lee starred in an office mystery drama VIP, starring alongside Jang Na-ra. The show went on to gain high viewership numbers and earned Lee the 2019 SBS Drama Award for Excellent Actor.

In 2020, Lee made his silver screen comeback with the action comedy Okay Madam where he played a charismatic North Korean spy who hijacks an airplane. Lee also made his live stage debut as the main lead of The Last Session, a philosophical play based on Mark St. Germain's 2010 broadway hit that deals with discussions of the meaning of life. After stepping down from his fixed cast role in Master in the House, Lee went on to join the variety basketball show, Handsome Tigers, in which he became team captain for a celebrity basketball team.

In 2021, Lee starred in the SBS drama One the Woman with Lee Hanee, Jin Seo-yeon and Lee Won-keun. The show was another hit series and he earned his first top excellence award in 2021 SBS Drama Awards throughout his career.

In 2022, Lee returns to the theater with the musical The Last Session, his second performance since 2020.

== Personal life ==
In 2013, Lee graduated from the prestigious Seoul National University with a degree in physics. He had entered as a freshman in 2000, but his acting career and mandatory military service had caused him to take several years of leave from SNU, resulting in his delayed graduation.

== Filmography ==
=== Film ===
Year	Title	Rol	Ref.
2007	Sex Is Zero 2	Gi-jo	
2014	Santa Barbara	Jung-woo	
2016	Insane	Na Nam-soo	
2020	Okay! Madam	Lee Chul-seung	
2026	Okay! Madam: Bon Voyage	Lee Chul-seung	

=== Television series ===
Year	Title	Role	Notes	Ref.
2007	Drama City – Transformation	Charles		
2007	Air City	Kim Jung-min		
2007	Drama City – Sky Lovers	Moon Ui-sik		
2007	Likeable or Not	Seo Woo-jin		
2008	The Scale of Providence	Kim Woo-bin		
2008	Don't Cry My Love	Jang Hyun-woo		
2009	Heading to the Ground	Jang Seung-woo		
2010	Jejungwon	Ji Seok-young	Cameo	
2010	Life Is Beautiful	Yang Ho-sub		
2010	Home Sweet Home	Kang Shin-woo		
2011	The Duo	Gwi-dong		
2012	Seoyoung, My Daughter	Kang Woo-jae		
2013	Goddess of Fire	Prince Gwanghae		
2014	Angel Eyes	Park Dong-joo / Dylan Park		
2014	Liar Game	Ha Woo-jin		
2015	Unkind Ladies	Top star	Cameo (Episode 3)	
2015	Second 20s	Cha Hyun-seok		
2016	On the Way to the Airport	Seo Do-woo		
2017	Whisper	Lee Dong-joon		
2018	About Time	Lee Do-ha		
2019	VIP	Park Sung-joon		
2021	One the Woman	Han Seung-wook / Alex Chang		
2023	Pandora: Beneath the Paradise	Pyo Jae-hyun		
2025	Mary Kills People	Choi Kang-yoon	Cameo (Episode 1–2)	

=== Web series ===
Year	Title	Role	Notes	Ref.
2020	Lovestruck in the City	Go Guo	Cameo (Episode 1–3)	
2023	Celebrity	Celebrity	Cameo (Episode 2, 7)	
2025	You and Everything Else	Kyung Seung Joo	Cameo	

=== Television shows ===
Year	Title	Role	Notes	Ref.
2017	Buzzer Beater (버저비터)	Cast member		
2017–2020	Master in the House	Cast member		
2020	Handsome Tigers (진짜 농구, 핸섬타이거즈)	Cast member		
2023	Leave Anything (뭐라도 남기리)	Cast member	with Kim Nam-gil	

== Theatre ==
Theater play performances
Year	Title		Role	Theater	Date	Ref.
Year	English	Korean	Role	Theater	Date	Ref.
2019	Almost, Maine	올모스트 메인		Yes 24 stage	November 15 to 17, 2019	
2020	Last Session	라스트세션	C.S. Lewis	Yes24 Stage 3rd Theater	July 10, 2020 – September 13, 2020	
2022	Last Session	라스트세션	C.S. Lewis	Daehangno TOM Theater Hall 1	January 7 to March 20	
2023	Last Session	라스트세션	C.S. Lewis	Daehangno TOM Theater Hall 1	July 8, 2023 – September 10, 2023	
2024	Closer	클로저	Larry	Plus Theater	April 23 to July 14	
2025	Death of the Salesman	세일즈맨의 죽음	Biff Loman	Sejong Cultural Center M Theater	January 7, 2025 – March 3, 2025	
2025	Death of the Salesman	세일즈맨의 죽음	Biff Loman	Jeonbuk National University Samsung Cultural Center	March 8 to March 9, 2025	
2025	Death of the Salesman	세일즈맨의 죽음	Biff Loman	Ayang Art Center	March 21 to 22, 2025	
2025	Waiting for Godot	고도를 기다리며를 기다리며	Val	Yes 24 Stage 3	September 16 to November 16, 2025	

== Awards and nominations ==
Name of the award ceremony, year presented, category, nominee of the award, and the result of the nomination
Award ceremony	Year	Category	Nominee / Work	Result	Ref.
APAN Star Awards	2013	Excellence Award, Actor	Seoyoung, My Daughter	Nominated	
APAN Star Awards	2015	Excellence Award, Actor in a Miniseries	Liar Game, Twenty Again	Nominated	
Asia Model Awards	2013	BBF Popular Star Award	Lee Sang-yoon	Won	
Bunjung Cultural Awards	2025	Daesang (Grand Prize)	Lee Sang-yoon	Won	
Baeksang Arts Awards	2013	Best Actor – Television	Seoyoung, My Daughter	Nominated	
Blue Dragon Film Awards	2016	Best New Actor	Insane	Nominated	
Grand Bell Awards	2016	Best New Actor	Insane	Nominated	
KBS Drama Awards	2012	Excellence Award, Actor in a Serial Drama	Seoyoung, My Daughter	Nominated	
KBS Drama Awards	2012	Best Couple Award	Lee Sang-yoon (with Lee Bo-young); Seoyoung, My Daughter	Won	
KBS Drama Awards	2016	Top Excellence Award, Actor	On the Way to the Airport	Nominated	
KBS Drama Awards	2016	Excellence Award, Actor in a Miniseries	On the Way to the Airport	Won	
KBS Drama Awards	2016	Best Couple Award	Lee Sang-yoon (with Kim Ha-neul); On the Way to the Airport	Won	
Korea Broadcasting Awards	2009	Best Newcomer, TV Actor category	Don't Cry My Love	Won	
Korean Culture and Entertainment Awards	2012	Popularity Award, Actor in a Drama	Seoyoung, My Daughter	Won	
Korea Drama Awards	2013	Excellence Award, Actor	Seoyoung, My Daughter, Goddess of Fire	Nominated	
MBC Drama Awards	2010	Best New Actor	Home Sweet Home	Won	
MBC Drama Awards	2013	Excellence Award, Actor in a Special Project Drama	Goddess of Fire	Nominated	
SBS Drama Awards	2014	Excellence Award, Actor in a Drama Special	Angel Eyes	Nominated	
SBS Drama Awards	2014	Best Couple Award	Lee Sang-yoon (with Ku Hye-sun); Angel Eyes	Nominated	
SBS Drama Awards	2017	Top Excellence Award, Actor in a Monday–Tuesday Drama	Whisper	Nominated	
SBS Drama Awards	2019	Excellence Award, Actor in a Miniseries	VIP	Won	
SBS Drama Awards	2021	Top Excellence Award, Actor in a Miniseries Romance/Comedy Drama	One the Woman	Won	
SBS Drama Awards	2021	Best Couple Award	Lee Sang-yoon (with Lee Hanee); One the Woman	Nominated	
SBS Entertainment Awards	2018	Rookie Award in Male Category	Master in the House	Won	
SBS Entertainment Awards	2019	Excellence Award in Show/Variety Category	Master in the House	Won	
