= Lee Hanee =

South Korean actress and model (born 1983)

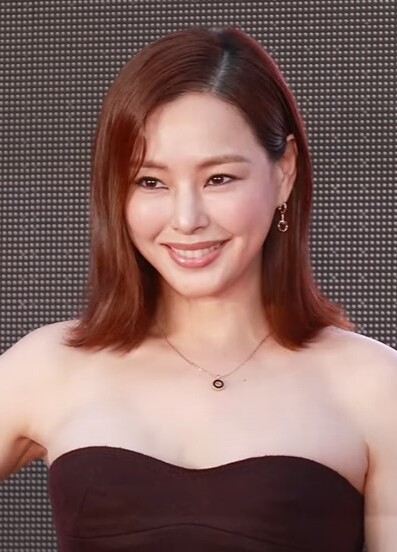
- Lee in 2024
- Born: March 2, 1983 (age 43); Seoul, South Korea
- Other name: Honey Lee
- Education: Seoul National University (BA, MA)
- Occupations: Actress; model
- Agents: TEAMHOPE; William Morris Endeavor
- Height: 1.73 m (5 ft 8 in)
- Spouse: Unknown (m. 2021)
- Children: 2
- Beauty pageant titleholder
- Title: Miss Korea 2006
- Major competitions: Miss Korea 2006 (Winner); Miss Universe 2007 (3rd Runner-Up)

Korean name
- Hangul: 이하늬
- Hanja: 李하늬
- RR: I Hanui
- MR: I Hani

Lee Hanee (Korean: 이하늬; born March 2, 1983), also known as Honey Lee, is a South Korean actress, model, and beauty pageant titleholder who was crowned Miss Korea 2006 and represented her country at Miss Universe 2007. She is known for starring in the films Deranged (2012), The Bros (2017), Extreme Job (2019), and Black Money (2019). In television, she gained recognition for her roles in The Rebel (2017), The Fiery Priest (2019–2024), One the Woman (2021), and Knight Flower (2024). For her performance in the latter, Lee won the Baeksang Arts Award for Best Actress.

== Early life ==
Lee Hanee is the middle child of three, and has an elder sister and a younger brother. Her father, Lee Sang-eob, was a high-ranking official with the National Intelligence Service. Her mother, Moon Jae-suk, has a PhD in Korean music history and is a professor at Ewha Womans University as well as music director of the Gimhae Gayageum Orchestra. Her sister is Lee Seul-gi, a member of the KBS Orchestra of Traditional Korean Music. Lee's maternal uncle is politician Moon Hee-sang (former Speaker of the National Assembly).

Lee graduated from Seoul National University with high honors in traditional Korean music. She received her master's degree from the same university.

== Career ==
=== Beauty pageant ===
Lee won the 2006 Miss Korea pageant and represented South Korea in the Miss Universe 2007. She managed to break into the Top 5 and placed as 3rd runner-up; Riyo Mori from Japan was crowned Miss Universe that year. Lee was also named Miss Grand Slam 2007.

=== Music ===
Lee is a professional gayageum player, a Korean music instrument. She was named a gayageum prodigy by the Kumho Art Center, the most prestigious musical foundation in Korea. She has released four CDs and played in more than 25 countries, including concerts at Carnegie Hall in New York City. In 2017, she participated in the largest-ever mass performance of the gayageum as part of the two-day Uijeongbu International Gayageum Festival. Lee performed at the closing ceremony of the 2018 Winter Olympics, where she reinterpreted '춘앵무 (Chunaengmu)', one of the royal dances of the Joseon period. Lee appeared in the music video For Dynamic Duo (South Korean duo)'s song "Jam". Presumably Lee plays a Honeybee in the video which is a pun on the honeybee themed video.

=== Film and television ===
Lee Hanee co-hosted Real Time TV Entertainment, on the national TV network SBS, a 12-year-old show focusing on show business, beginning July 18. In 2008, she made her acting debut in the musical Polaroid which opened at PMC Daehangno Jayu Theater in Hyehwa-dong, Jongno District. She has since starred in musicals Legally Blonde, playing Elle Woods and Chicago, playing Roxie Hart.

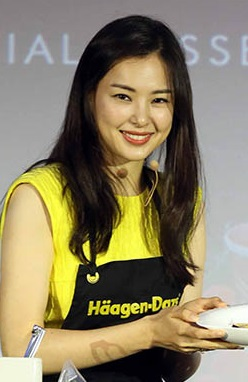
Lee in 2015

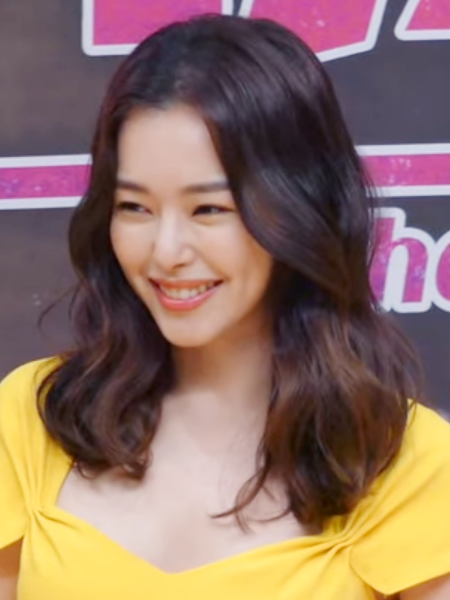
Lee in 2019

In 2009, Lee starred in her first television series The Partner, playing a femme fatale attorney. She next starred in the romantic comedy series Pasta (2010), playing a celebrity chef. Lee won her first acting accolade at the MBC Drama Awards, the Best Newcomer award for her performance in the family drama Iron Daughters-in-law (2011). In 2011, Lee was cast in her first big screen role in action film, Hit. She also featured in the disaster film Deranged and period comedy I Am a King (2012).

After appearing in E J-yong's ensemble mockumentary Behind the Camera (2013), Lee starred in the gambling film Tazza: The Hidden Card (2014), playing a rich widow. She also appeared in a comedy drama in 2014 called Modern Farmer which is about a rock band called "Excellent Souls." The band consists of Lee Min-Ki (Lee Hong-Ki), Kang Hyeok (Park Min-Woo), Yoo Han-Cheol (Lee Si-Un) and Han Ki-Joon (Kwak Dong-Yeon). The band decides to move to the countryside. The drama series follows their dreams, loves, and friendships.

Lee then played Queen Daemok in the 2015 historical drama Shine or Go Crazy, which depicts a fictional romance between a cursed Goryeo prince and the last princess of Balhae. The same year, she starred in the science fiction film Sori: Voice From The Heart. In 2016, Lee starred in the comedy drama Come Back Mister. Lee was praised for her chemistry with co-star Oh Yeon-seo, whom she has acted with in her previous project Shine or Go Crazy. In 2017, Lee played famous gisaeng Jang Nok-su in the historical drama The Rebel. She won critical praise for her portrayal, and won several acting awards. The same year, she featured in crime thriller Heart Blackened and action comedy film The Bros.

In 2019, Lee starred in the comedy film Extreme Job as a narcotics detective. The film became the second-most successful Korean film ever with 16 million tickets sold. The same year, she starred in comedy crime drama The Fiery Priest as a prosecutor. The drama was a commercial success with over 20% in ratings. Both projects proved Lee's versatility and contributed to her rise in popularity.

In 2021, Lee starred another SBS drama One the Woman with Lee Sang-yoon, Jin Seo-yeon and Lee Won-keun, making a small screen comeback in two years. She played dual roles as Jo Yeon-joo, a smart but corrupted prosecutor (which is similar to her previous drama The Fiery Priest) and Kang Mi-na, an illegitimate daughter of a chaebol who is abused by her family and her husband's family. The drama was a hit with the last episode achieving 3.2 million viewers and a rating of 17.8%. For her successful portrayal of dual character with polar opposite personality, she earned a top excellence award and daesang nomination at 2021 SBS Drama Awards.

== Personal life ==
Lee has been actively involved in voluntary work for several organizations such as UNICEF, Compassion and World Vision. She serves as the Goodwill Ambassador for Beauty Mind Charity and Korea Green Foundation. Lee holds a third degree black belt in Taekwondo, and is a scuba diver and a competitive skier. She is of Christian faith and once followed a vegetarian diet. But she began eating meat and fish for her own freedom according to her.

=== Relationship and marriage ===
On November 8, 2021, it was confirmed that Lee was dating a non-celebrity boyfriend. They have been dating since early 2021. On December 21, 2021, Saram Entertainment confirmed that Lee has married that day, and the wedding ceremony was held in Seoul where only family members attended. According to Lee's agency, her husband is a Korean-American office worker. In January 2022, Lee's agency announced that Lee was 4 months pregnant with her first child. On June 20, 2022, she gave birth to a daughter at a hospital in Seoul. On March 7, 2025, it was announced that Lee was expecting her second child. Lee gave birth to a second daughter on August 24.

=== Tax audit ===
In September 2024 the Seoul Regional Tax Office audited Lee and Hope Project. In February 2025 Team Hope confirmed an additional assessment of about ₩6 billion, including income tax, and said the amount had been paid. The agency stated that Lee had cooperated with a non-routine integrated audit of corporate artist businesses, that filings had been made on the advice of a tax agent, and that the extra tax reflected a difference of interpretation with the authorities rather than intentional evasion.

On 23 December 2025 the Gangnam Police Precinct referred Lee, her husband and Hope Project without detention to the Seoul Central District Prosecutors' Office for alleged operation of a popular culture and arts planning business without registration. Team Hope said Hope Project completed registration on 28 October 2025. As of March 2026 no court judgment on the referral had been reported. That month media also reported that a Hope Project branch office was registered at a restaurant in Yongsan District, Seoul. No criminal conviction for tax evasion was reported.

== Filmography ==
Key
†	Denotes films that have not yet been released

=== Film ===
Year	Title	Role	Notes	Ref.
2011	Hit	Seon-nyeo		
2012	Deranged	Yeon-joo		
2012	I Am the King	Soo-yeon		
2013	Behind the Camera	herself		
2014	Tazza: The Hidden Card	President Woo		
2015	Sori: Voice From The Heart	Ji-yeon		
2016	Lost in the Moonlight	Lady Maehwa	voice role	
2017	Fabricated City	Min Cheon-sang's secretary		
2017	Heart Blackened	Yoo-na		
2017	The Bros	Oh Ro-ra		
2019	Extreme Job	Det. Jang Yeon-soo		
2019	Black Money	Kim Na-ri		
2022	Alienoid	Min Kae-ae		
2023	Phantom	Park Cha-Kyung		
2023	Killing Romance	Hwang Yeo-rae		
2024	Alienoid: Return to the Future	Min Kae-ae		
2025	The People Upstairs	Soo-kyung		

=== Television series ===
Year	Title	Role	Notes	Ref.
2009	The Partner	Kim Jung-won		
2010	Pasta	Oh Se-young		
2011	Indomitable Daughters-in-Law	Kim Yeon-jung		
2012	Immortal Classic	Seo Young-joo		
2013	Don't Look Back: The Legend of Orpheus	Jang Young-hee		
2014	Modern Farmer	Kang Yoon-hee		
2015	Shine or Go Crazy	Hwangbo Yeo-won		
2016	Come Back Mister	Song Yi-yeon		
2017	The Rebel	Jang Nok-su		
2019–2024	The Fiery Priest	Park Gyung-sun	Season 1–2	
2019	Be Melodramatic	Actress	Cameo (episode 1)	
2021	One the Woman	Jo Yeon-joo / Kang Mi-na		
2024	Knight Flower	Jo Yeo-hwa		
2025	Aema	Jeong Hee-ran		
TBA	Show Business †	Yang-ja	Post-production	

=== Television shows ===
Year	Title	Role	Notes	Ref.
2007–2008	TV Entertainment Tonight	Host		
2010	Honey Lee's My Sweet Canada	Host		
2011	Opera Star 2011	Host		
2014	Four Sons and One Daughter - Season 1	Cast member		
2015–2017	Get it Beauty	Host		
2016	Saturday Night Live Korea	Host		
2016	LOVE Challenge 2	Cast member		
2017	Shall We Walk	Cast member		
2018	The Secret and Great Private Lives of Animals	Cast member		

== Theater ==
Year	Title	Role	Ref.
2008	Polaroid	Lee Se-yeon	
2009–2010	Legally Blonde	Elle Woods	
2013	Chicago	Roxie Hart	
2013–2014	Guys and Dolls	Sarah Brown	

== Accolades ==
=== Awards and nominations ===
Name of the award ceremony, year presented, category, nominee of the award, and the result of the nomination
Award ceremony	Year	Category	Nominee / Work	Result	Ref.
APAN Star Awards	2015	Best Supporting Actress	Shine or Go Crazy	Nominated	
APAN Star Awards	2022	Top Excellence Award, Actress in a Miniseries	One the Woman	Nominated	
APAN Star Awards	2024	Top Excellence Award, Actress in a Miniseries	Knight Flower	Won	
Baeksang Arts Awards	2015	Best New Actress – Film	Tazza: The Hidden Card	Nominated	
Baeksang Arts Awards	2018	Best Supporting Actress – Film	Heart Blackened	Nominated	
Baeksang Arts Awards	2019	Best Supporting Actress – Film	Extreme Job	Nominated	
Baeksang Arts Awards	2024	Best Actress – Film	Killing Romance	Nominated	
Baeksang Arts Awards	2024	Best Actress – Television	Knight Flower	Won	
Bechdel Day	2023	Bechdelian in Film	Phantom	Won	
Bechdel Day	2024	Bechdelian in Series	Knight Flower	Won	
Blue Dragon Film Awards	2014	Best Supporting Actress	Tazza: The Hidden Card	Nominated	
Blue Dragon Film Awards	2019	Best Supporting Actress	Extreme Job	Nominated	
Blue Dragon Film Awards	2019	Popular Star Award	Extreme Job	Won	
BIFF Marie Claire Asian Star Awards	2019	Marie Claire Award	Extreme Job	Won	
Daegu Musical Festival	2013	Best Newcomer	Chicago	Won	
Elle Style Awards	2024	Woman of Inspiration Award	Lee Hanee	Won	
Golden Cinematography Awards	2021	Best Actress	Black Money	Won	
Grand Bell Awards	2014	Best New Actress	Tazza: The Hidden Card	Nominated	
Grand Bell Awards	2014	Popularity Award	Tazza: The Hidden Card	Won	
Grand Bell Awards	2020	Best Supporting Actress	Extreme Job	Nominated	
KBS Entertainment Awards	2018	Rookie Award, Variety	The Secret and Great Private Lives of Animals	Won	
Korea Drama Awards	2017	Top Excellence Award, Actress	The Rebel	Won	
Korea Drama Awards	2024	Grand Prize (Daesang)	Knight Flower	Won	
Korea Film Actors Association Star Night - Korea Top Star Awards Ceremony	2017	Best Supporting Actress	The Bros, Heart Blackened	Won	
Korea Jewelry Awards	2010	Sapphire Award	Lee Hanee	Won	
MBC Drama Awards	2011	Best New Actress	Indomitable Daughters-in-Law	Won	
MBC Drama Awards	2017	Top Excellence Award, Actress in a Monday-Tuesday Drama	The Rebel	Won	
MBC Drama Awards	2024	Grand Prize (Daesang)	Knight Flower	Nominated	
MBC Drama Awards	2024	Top Excellence Award, Actress in a Miniseries	Knight Flower	Won	
MBC Drama Awards	2024	Best Couple Award	Lee Hanee (with Lee Jong-won); Knight Flower	Nominated	
Miss Korea Pageant	2006	Miss Korea - Jin	Lee Hanee	Won	
Miss Universe Pageant	2007	Third runner-up	Lee Hanee	Won	
Mnet 20's Choice Awards	2011	Hot Body Female	Lee Hanee	Won	
New York Asian Film Festival	2023	Best from the East Award	Killing Romance	Won	
SBS Drama Awards	2014	Excellence Award, Actress in a Drama Special	Modern Farmer	Nominated	
SBS Drama Awards	2016	Special Acting Award, Actress in a Fantasy Drama	Come Back Mister	Nominated	
SBS Drama Awards	2019	Top Excellence Award, Actress in a Mid-Length Drama	The Fiery Priest	Won	
SBS Drama Awards	2019	Producer's Award	The Fiery Priest	Nominated	
SBS Drama Awards	2021	Grand Prize (Daesang)	One the Woman	Nominated	
SBS Drama Awards	2021	Top Excellence Award, Actress in a Miniseries Romance/Comedy Drama	One the Woman	Won	
SBS Drama Awards	2021	Best Couple Award	Lee Hanee (with Lee Sang-yoon); One the Woman	Nominated	
SBS Drama Awards	2024	Top Excellence Award, Actress in a Seasonal Drama	The Fiery Priest 2	Won	
Style Icon Asia	2016	Top 10 Style Icons	Lee Hanee	Won	
The Seoul Awards	2017	Best Supporting Actress	The Rebel	Won	

=== State honors ===
Name of country, year given, and name of honor
Country or Organization	Year	Honor or Award	Ref.
South Korea (Note: Honors are given at the Korean Popular Culture and Arts Awards, arranged by the Korea Creative Content Agency and hosted by the Ministry of Culture, Sports and Tourism. They are awarded to those who have contributed to the arts and South Korea's pop culture.)	2019	The Ministry of Culture, Sports and Tourism commendation	

=== Listicles ===
Name of publisher, year listed, name of listicle, and placement
Publisher	Year	Listicle	Rank	Ref.
Cine21	2022	Actress to watch out for in 2023	5th (Note: Tied with Kim Hye-soo)	
Forbes	2018	Korea Power Celebrity 40	26th	
The Screen	2019	2009–2019 Top Box Office Powerhouse Actors in Korean Movies	30th	
Korean Film Council	2021	Korean Actors 200 (Note: Introduces 200 actors that best represent the present and future of Korean cinema to the people in the film industry all over the world.)	Included	

== Notes ==
Awards and achievements
Preceded by (Paraguay) Lourdes Arévalos	3rd Runner-Up Miss Universe; 2007	Succeeded by (Russia) Vera Krasova
