= 2021 SBS Drama Awards =

29th edition of award ceremony

- 2021 SBS Drama Awards logo
- Date: December 31, 2021
- Site: SBS Prism Tower, Sangam-dong, Mapo-gu, Seoul
- Hosted by: Shin Dong-yup; Kim Yoo-jung
- Official website: 2021 SBS Awards

Highlights
- Grand Prize (Daesang): Kim So-yeon

Television coverage
- Network: SBS
- Viewership: Ratings: 5.4%; Viewership: 1.143 million people

The 2021 SBS Drama Awards, presented by Seoul Broadcasting System (SBS), was held on December 31, 2021, at 21.00 (KST) at SBS Prism Tower, Sangam-dong, Mapo-gu, Seoul. The show was hosted by Shin Dong-yup and Kim Yoo-jung consecutively for 2nd year. The prelude to drama awards to be aired on SBS TV was released on December 13, 2021. Grand Prize (Daesang) was awarded to Kim So-yeon.

== Winners and nominees ==
- Winners are listed first and denoted in **bold**

Grand Prize (Daesang)	Director's Award
**Kim So-yeon – The Penthouse: War in Life 2 and 3**; Song Hye-kyo – Now, We Are Breaking Up; Lee Je-hoon – Taxi Driver; Lee Hanee – One the Woman	**Kim Da-mi – Our Beloved Summer**; **Choi Woo-shik – Our Beloved Summer**
Top Excellence Award, Actor in a Miniseries Genre/Fantasy Drama	Top Excellence Award, Actress in a Miniseries Genre/Fantasy Drama
**Lee Je-hoon – Taxi Driver**; Kim Sang-kyung – Racket Boys; Um Ki-joon – The Penthouse: War in Life 2 and 3	**Kim Yoo-jung – Lovers of the Red Sky**; Kim So-yeon – The Penthouse: War in Life 2 and 3; Eugene – The Penthouse: War in Life 2 and 3; Lee Ji-ah – The Penthouse: War in Life 2 and 3
Top Excellence Award, Actor in a Miniseries Romance/Comedy Drama	Top Excellence Award, Actress in a Miniseries Romance/Comedy Drama
**Lee Sang-yoon – One the Woman**; Jang Ki-yong – Now, We Are Breaking Up; Choi Woo-shik – Our Beloved Summer	**Lee Hanee – One the Woman**; Kim Da-mi – Our Beloved Summer; Song Hye-kyo – Now, We Are Breaking Up
Excellence Award, Actor in a Miniseries Genre/Fantasy Drama	Excellence Award, Actress in a Miniseries Genre/Fantasy Drama
**Ahn Hyo-seop – Lovers of the Red Sky**; Gong Myung – Lovers of the Red Sky; Park Eun-seok – The Penthouse: War in Life 2 and 3	**Esom – Taxi Driver**; Oh Na-ra – Racket Boys; Yoon Joo-hee – The Penthouse: War in Life 2 and 3; Pyo Ye-jin – Taxi Driver
Excellence Award, Actor in a Miniseries Romance/Comedy Drama	Excellence Award, Actress in a Miniseries Romance/Comedy Drama
**Kim Joo-hun – Now, We Are Breaking Up**; Kim Sung-cheol – Our Beloved Summer; Lee Won-keun – One the Woman; Lee Jun-young – Let Me Be Your Knight	**Jin Seo-yeon – One the Woman**; Park Jin-joo – Our Beloved Summer; Choi Hee-seo – Now, We Are Breaking Up
Best Supporting Actor in a Miniseries Genre/Fantasy Drama	Best Supporting Actress in a Miniseries Genre/Fantasy Drama
**Kim Eui-sung – Taxi Driver**; Shin Jung-geun – Racket Boys; Jo Sung-ha – Lovers of the Red Sky	**Cha Ji-yeon – Taxi Driver**; Moon Sook – Lovers of the Red Sky; Cha Mi-kyung – Racket Boys
Best Supporting Actor in a Miniseries Romance/Comedy Drama	Best Supporting Actress in a Miniseries Romance/Comedy Drama
**Song Won-seok – One the Woman**; Kim Won-hae – One the Woman; Jang Hyuk-jin – Now, We Are Breaking Up	**Park Hyo-joo – Now, We Are Breaking Up**; Na Young-hee – One the Woman; Ye Soo-jung – One the Woman
Best Couple Award	Scene Stealer Award
**Ahn Hyo-seop & Kim Yoo-jung – Lovers of the Red Sky**; Uhm Ki-joon & Kim So-yeon – The Penthouse: War in Life 2 and 3; Lee Sang-yoon & Lee Hanee – One the Woman; Jang Ki-yong & Song Hye-kyo – Now, We Are Breaking Up; Choi Woo-shik & Kim Da-mi – Our Beloved Summer	**Shim So-young – Taxi Driver**; Jung Ah-mi – The Penthouse: War in Life 2 and 3; Jo Ye-rin – Lovers of the Red Sky; Heo Sung-tae – Racket Boys; Hwang Young-hee – One the Woman
Best New Actor	Best New Actress
**Kim Young-dae – The Penthouse: War in Life 2 and 3**; **Son Sang-yeon – Racket Boys**; **Choi Hyun-wook - Racket Boys and Taxi Driver**	**Choi Ye-bin – The Penthouse: War in Life 2 and 3**; **Han Ji-hyun – The Penthouse: War in Life 2 and 3**; **Roh Jeong-eui – Our Beloved Summer**
Best Character Award, Actor	Best Character Award, Actress
**Kwak Si-yang – Lovers of the Red Sky**; Kim Chang-wan – One the Woman; On Joo-wan – The Penthouse: War in Life 2 and 3	**Oh Na-ra – Racket Boys**; Jung In-sun – Let Me Be Your Knight; Choi Hee-seo – Now, We Are Breaking Up
Best Young Actor	Best Young Actress
**Tang Jun-sang – Racket Boys**	**Lee Jae-in – Racket Boys**
Lifetime Achievement Award	Best Supporting Team
**Kim Soon-ok – Writer of The Penthouse: War in Life**	**Racket Boys**; One the Woman; Taxi Driver

== Presenters ==
Order	Presenter	Award	Ref.
1	Jo Byeong-kyu and So Joo-yeon	Best New Actor/Actress	
2	Ahn Ji-ho and Kim Hyun-soo	Best Young Actor/Actress	
3	Jin Seon-kyu and Kim So-jin	Scene Stealer Award	
4	Im Won-hee and Jin Kyung	Best Supporting Actor/Actress in a Mini-Series Romance/Comedy Drama	
5	Kim Joo-hun and Park Eun-seok	Best Supporting Actor/Actress in a Mini-Series Genre/Fantasy Drama	
6	Lee Jun-hyeok and Cha-yeop	Best Supporting Team	
7	Ahn Hyo-seop and Kim Se-jeong	Best Couple Award	
8	Oh Jung-se and Lee Sung-kyung	Excellence Award for an Actor/Actress in a Mini-Series Romance/Comedy Drama	
9	Bong Tae-gyu and Yoon Jong-hoon	Excellence Award for an Actor/Actress in a Mini-Series Genre/Fantasy Drama	
10	Hwang In-youp and Bae In-hyuk	Best Character Award	
11	Uhm Ki-joon and Kim So-yeon	Top Excellence Award for an Actor/Actress in a Mini-Series Romance/Comedy Drama	
12	Lee Joon-gi and Kim Ji-eun	Top Excellence Award for an Actor/Actress in a Mini-Series Genre/Fantasy Drama	
13	Joo Won	Director's Award	
14	Han Jeong-hwan (CEO of Studio S) and Namkoong Min	Grand Prize (Daesang)	

== Performances ==
Order	Artist	Act performed	Ref.
1	Cha Ji-yeon	"Earth Song"	
2	Choi Hyun-wook, Kim Kang-hoon and Kim Min-ki with The Boyz	"Will Be" (지금처럼; Like Now) (Racket Boys OST)	
3	STAYC	"ASAP" + "Stereotype"	

== See also ==
- 2021 KBS Drama Awards
- 2021 MBC Drama Awards
