= Na Young-hee =

South Korean actress (born 1961)

- Born: September 20, 1961 (age 65); Boeun, South Korea
- Occupation: Actress
- Years active: 1981–present
- Agent: Ace Factory
- Children: 1

Korean name
- Hangul: 방숙희
- RR: Bang Sukhui
- MR: Pang Sukhŭi

Stage name
- Hangul: 나영희
- Hanja: 羅英熙
- RR: Na Yeonghui
- MR: Na Yŏnghŭi

Na Young-hee (Korean: 나영희, born September 20, 1961), born Bang Suk-hui, is a South Korean actress. Na was born in Boeun, North Chungcheong Province, South Korea.

== Filmography ==
=== Film ===
*Note: the whole list is referenced.

Year	Title	Role	Notes
1981	Children of Darkness Part 1, Young-ae the Songstress		
1982	Come Unto Down		
1982	Ardent Love		
1982	A Night's Heaven		
1982	Sea Gull, Don't Fly Away		
1982	Woman of Fire '82		
1983	Crying in a Butterfly's Embrace		
1983	The Flower at the Equator		
1983	As Firm As A Stone		
1983	Rose Woman		
1983	A Woman's Outing		
1984	The Last Day of That Summer		
1984	Woman Who Grabbed The Rod		
1984	Deer Hunting		
1985	When You Least Expect It		
1985	Riding the Moonlight		
1985	It Happened At Night		
1986	With Her Eyes and Body		
1986	Hero's Love Song		
1986	Closer, Further, Closer		
1987	Janus' Lady of Fire		
1987	0.917		
1987	Eve's Second Bedroom		
1988	Don Quixote on Asphalt		
1988	Prostitution		
1988	The Lady in the Wall		
1988	Naked		
1989	Prostitution 2		
1989	The Report of the Daughter-in-law's Rice Flower		
1994	Mom, the Star, and the Sea Anemone		
2000	Mission Baraba		
2008	Hello, Schoolgirl	Suyeong's mother	Cameo
2012	Horror Stories	Lady Jang	Segment "Secret Recipe"
2017	Forgotten	Mother	

=== Television series ===
Year	Title	Role	Notes	Ref.
2005	Sad Love Story	Seo Hyangja		
2009	Style	Son Myung-hee		
2009	Queen of Housewives	Jang Young-sook		
2012	My Husband Got a Family	Jang Yang-shil		
2012	The Birth of a Family	Jang Mi-hee		
2012	Rooftop Prince	President Jang Seon-joo		
2013–2014	The Noblesse	Gi-ha's mother		
2013	Good Doctor	Lee Yeo-won		
2014	You Are My Destiny	Lee Gun's stepmother and Lee Yong's mother		
2014	Mother's Garden	Yoo Ji-sun		
2014	My Love from the Star	Yang Mi-yeon		
2014–2015	What Happens to My Family?	Baek Seol-hee		
2015	The Producers	Byun Mi-sook		
2015	Glamorous Temptation	Hyeong-woo's mother		
2015	I Have a Lover	Hong Se-hee		
2016	Lucky Romance	Yang Hee-ae		
2016	The Legend of the Blue Sea	Mo Yoo-ran		
2017	My Golden Life	Noh Myung-Hee		
2018	About Time	Jin Ra-hee		
2018	The Beauty Inside	Im Jung-yeon		
2018	Children of Nobody	Heo Jin-ok		
2019–2020	Beautiful Love, Wonderful Life	Hong Yoo-ra		
2019	Crash Landing on You	North Korean wedding dress boutique owner	Cameo (Ep. 7)	
2020	Cheat on Me If You Can	Han Woo-sung's mother		
2021	One the Woman	Seo Young-won		
2022	Gold Mask	Cha Hwa-young		
2024	Queen of Divorce	Cha Hee-won		
2024	Queen of Tears	Kim Seon-hwa		
2024–2025	Cinderella Game	Shin Yeo-jin		

== Awards and nominations ==
- 2021 2021 SBS Drama Awards Best Supporting Actress in a Mini-Series Romance/Comedy Drama One the Woman nom
- 2018, the 54th Baeksang Arts Awards: Best Supporting Actress (nominee) for My Golden Life
- 2009 MBC Drama Awards: Golden Acting Award, Actress in a Miniseries (Queen of Housewives)
- 1989, the 25th Baeksang Arts Awards: Best Favorite Film Actress for (매춘)
- 1989, the third Korean Film Critics Association Awards: Best Actress for (백구야 훨훨 날지마라)
- 1989, the 3rd Korean Film Critics Association Awards: Best Actress for (백구야 훨훨 날지마라)
- 1982, the 18th Baeksang Arts Awards, New Film Actress for (어둠의 자식들)
- 1981 the 2nd Korean Film Critics Association Awards: New Actress for (어둠의 자식들)
