= About Time (TV series) =

2018 South Korean televisions series

- Promotional poster
- Hangul: 멈추고 싶은 순간: 어바웃타임
- Lit.: A Moment I Want to Stop: About Time
- RR: Meomchugo sipeun sungan: eobaut taim
- MR: Mŏmch'ugo sip'ŭn sun'gan: ŏbaut t'aim
- Genre: Fantasy; Romance; Melodrama
- Created by: Studio Dragon
- Written by: Chu Hye-mi
- Directed by: Kim Hyung-sik; Park Shin-woo
- Starring: Lee Sang-yoon; Lee Sung-kyung
- Country of origin: South Korea
- Original language: Korean
- No. of episodes: 16

Production
- Executive producers: Lee Chan-ho; Lee Eon-jung
- Producers: Kim Na-kyung; Park Eun-kyung; Bae Sun-hae; Lee Min-jin
- Editor: Kim Yoo-mi
- Running time: 60 minutes
- Production company: Story TV

Original release
- Network: tvN
- Release: May 21 – July 10, 2018

About Time (Korean: 멈추고 싶은 순간: 어바웃타임) is a 2018 fantasy romance South Korean television series starring Lee Sang-yoon and Lee Sung-kyung. It aired on tvN from May 21 to July 10, 2018, every Monday and Tuesday at 21:30 (KST).

== Synopsis ==
Choi Michaela (Lee Sung-kyung) is an aspiring musical actress who has the special ability to see people's life spans. One day, while she's heading off to an audition, she becomes involved in a minor car accident and meets Lee Do-ha (Lee Sang-yoon), a chaebol son and the president of cultural foundation MK Entertainment. After unexpectedly discovering that her life clock stops whenever she's with him, she becomes determined to keep him close at all costs. Things take an interesting and painful turn as the two begin to fall in love.

== Cast ==
=== Main ===
- Lee Sang-yoon as Lee Do-ha
  - Moon Woo-jin as young Lee Do-ha

A chaebol son and president of the cultural foundation MK Entertainment. He seems rude and belligerent upon first meeting Michaela, but eventually warms up to and develops feelings for her as they spend time together, revealing the gentle and tender-hearted side of him. He receives counselling on a regular basis from a psychiatrist and a close friend, Park Sung-bin, since he suffers from anxiety disorders and frequent panic attacks. His relationship with Michaela causes problems in his business and with his family, as well as with his fiancé Bae Soo-bong, due to their arranged marriage.

- Lee Sung-kyung as Choi Michaela / Mika

A young and aspiring musial actress with the unfortunate fate of seeing the life spans of other people, including those around her. After initially beginning to work for Do-ha as his personal driver in order to remain by his side to extend her life span, she falls in love with him. However, she often feels guilty and conflicted about using him for her own benefit, and faces constant harassment from Bae Soo-bong to end their relationship.

=== Supporting ===
==== Lee Do-ha's family ====
- Jung Dong-hwan as Lee Seon-moon

Chairman of MK Group. Lee Do-ha's cold-hearted father.

- Min Sung-wook as Lee Do-bin
  - Kim Ji-wan as young Do-bin

CEO of MK Group Hotel. Do-ha's older brother.

- Kim Sa-hee as Kim Hye-young

Do-bin's wife. An aloof and elegant rich woman who hides a secret.

- Jung Moon-sung as Yoon Do-san
  - Lee Min-sung as young Do-san

A travel writer. Do-ha and Do-bin's half-brother.

==== Choi Michaela's family ====
- Na Young-hee as Jin Ra-hee

Choi Michaela's spoilt mother.

- Rowoon as Choi Wee-jin

Choi Michaela's younger brother who falls in love with Sung-hee.

- Ryu Tae-ho as Choi Tae-pyung

Choi Michaela's father who is incarcerated.

==== People around Lee Do-ha ====
- Im Se-mi as Bae Soo-bong

The director of MJBC music magazine who is engaged to Do-ha and has had an unrequited love for him for several years. Do-ha's relationship with Michaela makes her jealous and insecure about her place within his life and family.

- Tae In-ho as Park Sung-bin

Do-ha's friend and psychiatrist, and Woo-jin's older brother.

- Kang Ki-doong as Park Woo-jin

Do-ha's secretary and Sung-bin's younger brother.

==== People around Choi Michaela ====
- Han Seung-yeon as Jeon Sung-hee

Choi Michaela's best friend who is currently working as an assistant director for Jo Jae-yoo and falls in love with Wee-jin.

- Kim Hae-sook as Oh So-nyeo

A reliable ally of Choi Michaela who secretly shares her same ability.

==== Others ====
- Kim Dong-jun as Jo Jae-yoo

A strict musical director from Broadway who is well known for his genius abilities. He is hired by Do-ha to work on the musical production "Yeon-hui's Time Flows Backwards", with hopes of expanding his entertainment group and theatre business into China. Initially, he is very critical of Michaela's talents, but offers encouragement and insight occasionally as the two become friends over time.

- Jang Gwang as Mr. Park, Oh So-nyeo's boyfriend
- Oh Ah-rin as Yoon Ah-in

=== Special appearances ===
- Baek Ji-won as a wife (Ep. 1)
- Lee Dae-yeon as a husband (Ep. 1)
- Kim Kyung-nam as a police officer (Ep. 2)
- Kim Gyu-ri as Kim Joon-ah (Ep. 5-10)

A Broadway actress and Do-ha's first love.

- Yu Xiaoguang as Zhang Qiang

== Production ==
- The first script reading was held in February 2018.
- Actor Lee Seo-won, who was supposed to play the supporting role of Jo Jae-yoo, was pulled out of the production prior to airing due to criminal charges filed against him. He was replaced by Kim Dong-jun.

== Original soundtrack ==
About Time OST

Soundtrack album by Various artists
- Released: 2018
- Genre: Soundtrack
- Language: Korean
- Labels: Stone Music Entertainment, CREAHUB

=== Part 1 ===
Released on May 22, 2018
No.	Title	Lyrics	Music	Artist	Length
1.	"Amazing Thing" (신기한 일)	Lee Sang-hoon	Lee Sang-hoon, Choi Hye-sung	Kim E-Z (GGot Jam Project)	3:14
2.	"Amazing Thing" (Inst.)		Lee Sang-hoon, Choi Hye-sung		3:14
Total length:					6:28

=== Part 2 ===
Released on May 29, 2018
No.	Title	Lyrics	Music	Artist	Length
1.	"Yesterday"	Mathi, Park Geun-chul, Jung Su-min	Park Geun-chul, Jung Su-min	Park Bo-ram	4:16
2.	"Yesterday" (Inst.)		Park Geun-chul, Jung Su-min		4:16
Total length:					8:32

=== Part 3 ===
Released on June 12, 2018
No.	Title	Lyrics	Music	Artist	Length
1.	"Maybe"	RUNY, Park Geun-chul, Jung Su-min	Park Geun-chul, Jung Su-min, RUNY	Hui (Pentagon)	4:21
2.	"Maybe" (Inst.)		Park Geun-chul, Jung Su-min, RUNY		4:21
Total length:					8:42

=== Part 4 ===
Released on June 19, 2018
No.	Title	Lyrics	Music	Artist	Length
1.	"Tears Flow" (눈물이 나)	Mackelli	Mackelli	Mackelli	3:40
2.	"Tears Flow" (Inst.)		Mackelli		3:40
Total length:					7:20

=== Part 5 ===
Released on June 26, 2018
No.	Title	Lyrics	Music	Artist	Length
1.	"My Room"	Mathi, Park Geun-chul, Jung Su-min	Park Geun-chul, Jung Su-min	Hong Dae-kwang	3:35
2.	"My Room" (Inst.)		Park Geun-chul, Jung Su-min		3:35
Total length:					7:10

== Viewership ==
About Time : South Korea viewers per episode (thousands)

Season	Episode number															
Season	1	2	3	4	5	6	7	8	9	10	11	12	13	14	15	16
1	390	436	310	316	348	358	305	473	217	342	262	455	375	304	N/A	346

Source: Audience measurement performed nationwide by Nielsen Korea.

Average TV viewership ratings
Ep.	Original broadcast date	Average audience share (Nielsen Korea)	
Ep.	Original broadcast date	Nationwide	Seoul
1	May 21, 2018	1.766%	2.249%
2	May 22, 2018	2.103%	2.842%
3	May 28, 2018	1.338%	1.327%
4	May 29, 2018	1.491%	1.766%
5	June 4, 2018	1.483%	1.595%
6	June 5, 2018	1.652%	2.098%
7	June 11, 2018	1.452%	1.493%
8	June 12, 2018	2.083%	2.344%
9	June 18, 2018	0.887%	1.206%
10	June 19, 2018	1.628%	1.562%
11	June 25, 2018	1.262%	1.380%
12	June 26, 2018	1.888%	1.952%
13	July 2, 2018	1.838%	1.828%
14	July 3, 2018	1.491%	1.739%
15	July 9, 2018	1.239%	1.574%
16	July 10, 2018	1.771%	1.985%
Average		1.586%	1.809%
In the table above, the blue numbers represent the lowest ratings and the red numbers represent the highest ratings.; This series aired on a cable channel/pay TV which normally has a relatively smaller audience compared to free-to-air TV/public broadcasters (KBS, SBS, MBC and EBS).
