= Tell Me What You Saw =

2020 South Korean television series

- Promotional poster
- Also known as: Say It as You See It
- Hangul: 본 대로 말하라
- Lit.: Say What You Saw
- RR: Bon daero malhara
- MR: Pon taero marhara
- Genre: Thriller, Suspense
- Created by: Kim Hong-sun
- Developed by: Studio Dragon
- Written by: Ko Young-jae; Han Ki-hyun
- Directed by: Kim Sang-hoon
- Starring: Jang Hyuk; Choi Soo-young; Jin Seo-yeon
- Composer: Gaemi
- Country of origin: South Korea
- Original language: Korean
- No. of episodes: 16

Production
- Executive producer: Kim Hong-sun
- Running time: 60 minutes
- Production company: H House

Original release
- Network: OCN
- Release: February 1 – March 22, 2020

Tell Me What You Saw (Korean: 본 대로 말하라) is a 2020 South Korean television series starring Jang Hyuk, Choi Soo-young, and Jin Seo-yeon. It aired on OCN from February 1 to March 22, 2020.

== Synopsis ==
Oh Hyun-jae (Jang Hyuk) was a genius profiler who cracked many cold cases using his unsurpassed profiling skills. One day, his fiancée was killed in an explosion set by a serial killer and Hyun-jae lived in seclusion after that. Five years later, a new murder takes place using the same method as that serial killer. While investigating the case, team leader Hwang Ha-young (Jin Seo-yeon) meets a detective from the countryside, Cha Soo-young (Choi Soo-young), who has a photographic memory. She introduced Soo-young to Hyun-jae and they work together to go after the serial killer.

== Cast ==
=== Main ===
- Jang Hyuk as Oh Hyun-jae

A genius criminal profiler who became a recluse after losing his fiancée in an explosion.

- Choi Soo-young as Cha Soo-young

A rookie detective from the countryside with a photographic memory.

=== Supporting ===
==== People in Mucheon Metropolitan Police Agency ====
- Jin Seo-yeon as Hwang Ha-young

The team leader of the Regional Investigation Unit (RIU).

- Jang Hyun-sung as Choi Hyung-pil

An ambitious senior superintendent of the Mucheon Metropolitan Police Agency.

- Ryu Seung-soo as Yang Man-soo

A veteran detective in the Regional Investigation Unit (RIU).

- Shin Soo-ho as Jang Tae-sung

A reckless detective in the RIU.

- Yoo Hee-je as Lee Ji-min

A brainy detective in the RIU.

==== People around Oh Hyun-jae ====
- Lee Si-won as Han I-su

Hyun-jae's fiancée who was a brilliant cellist.

- Lee Ki-hyuk as Won Se-yoon

==== People around Cha Soo-young ====
- Ha Sung-kwang as Cha Man-suk

Soo-young's father who is a deaf-mute.

- Eum Moon-suk as Kang Dong-sik

A countryside policeman who used to work as Soo-young's partner.

== Original soundtrack ==
Tell Me What You Saw OST

Soundtrack album by Various artists
- Released: 2020
- Genre: Soundtrack
- Languages: Korean, English
- Labels: NHN Bugs; Most Content

=== Part 1 ===
Released on February 8, 2020
No.	Title	Artist	Length
1.	"Be Colored" (물들어간다)	Kim Yoon-ah	3:20
2.	"Be Colored" (Inst.)		3:20

=== Part 2 ===
Released on February 15, 2020
No.	Title	Artist	Length
1.	"This Game"	Lee Ba-da	3:27
2.	"This Game" (Inst.)		3:27

=== Part 3 ===
Released on February 22, 2020
No.	Title	Artist	Length
1.	"Remember" (기억해)	Kim Han-kyul	4:02
2.	"Remember" (Inst.)		4:02

=== Part 4 ===
Released on February 29, 2020
No.	Title	Artist	Length
1.	"Sinner"	Darin	3:10
2.	"Sinner" (Inst.)		3:10

=== Part 5 ===
Released on March 7, 2020
No.	Title	Artist	Length
1.	"What You See"	Ugly Duck	3:30
2.	"What You See" (Inst.)		3:30

=== Part 6 ===
Released on March 14, 2020
No.	Title	Artist	Length
1.	"Price 2 Pay"	Fondres	3:23
2.	"Price 2 Pay" (Inst.)		3:23

== Ratings ==
Tell Me What You Saw : South Korea viewers per episode (thousands)

Season	Episode number																Average
Season	1	2	3	4	5	6	7	8	9	10	11	12	13	14	15	16	Average
1	546	902	436	901	631	926	N/A	901	N/A	945	678	958	707	977	601	1192	N/A

Source: Audience measurement performed nationwide by Nielsen Korea.

Average TV viewership ratings
Ep.	Original broadcast date	Title	Average audience share (Nielsen Korea)	
Ep.	Original broadcast date	Title	Nationwide	Seoul
1	February 1, 2020	An instant, 1/75th of a second	2.031%	2.357%
2	February 2, 2020	Ghost Image	3.256%	3.692%
3	February 8, 2020	Evidence	1.668%	—N/a
4	February 9, 2020	Signature	3.310%	3.773%
5	February 15, 2020	Inattentional Blindness	2.221%	2.622%
6	February 16, 2020	Velocity	3.538%	4.433%
7	February 22, 2020	Reflection	1.840%	—N/a
8	February 23, 2020	Variable	3.687%	4.287%
9	February 29, 2020	Optical Illusion	2.224%	—N/a
10	March 1, 2020	Decalcomanie	3.364%	4.161%
11	March 7, 2020	Dice	2.537%	3.016%
12	March 8, 2020	Motion	3.753%	4.182%
13	March 14, 2020	Random	2.387%	2.909%
14	March 15, 2020	Explosion	3.759%	4.369%
15	March 21, 2020	Trinity	2.430%	3.108%
16	March 22, 2020	Liber Proverbiorum 6:17	4.388%	5.028%
Average			2.900%	— (Note: Due to some ratings not recorded, the exact average rating is unknown.)
In the table above, the blue numbers represent the lowest ratings and the red numbers represent the highest ratings.; N/A denotes that the rating is not known.; This drama aired on a cable channel/pay TV which normally has a relatively smaller audience compared to free-to-air TV/public broadcasters (KBS, SBS, MBC and EBS).
