= Goddess of Fire =

- Promotional poster for Goddess of Fire
- Also known as: Goddess of Fire, Jung Yi; Jung Yi, the Goddess of Fire; Goddess of Fire, Jeongi
- Genre: Historical; Romance
- Written by: Kwon Soon-kyu; Lee Seo-yoon
- Directed by: Park Sung-soo; Jung Dae-yoon
- Starring: Moon Geun-young; Lee Sang-yoon; Kim Bum
- Composer: Lee Pil-ho
- Country of origin: South Korea
- Original language: Korean
- No. of episodes: 32

Production
- Executive producers: Go Dong-sun; Kim Seung-mo
- Producer: Kim Kwang-il
- Production locations: South Korea; Japan
- Cinematography: Lee Tae-hee; Jo Seong-soo
- Editor: Im Gyeong-rae
- Production companies: KPAX; MBC C&I

Original release
- Network: MBC TV
- Release: July 1 – October 22, 2013

Goddess of Fire (Korean: 불의 여신 정이; RR: Burui yeosin jeongi; lit. 'Goddess of Fire, Jung Yi') is a 2013 South Korean television series starring Moon Geun-young, Lee Sang-yoon, Kim Bum, Park Gun-hyung, Seo Hyun-jin, Jun Kwang-ryul, Jeong Bo-seok, Byun Hee-bong, Han Go-eun, and Lee Kwang-soo. It aired on MBC from July 1 to October 22, 2013 on Mondays and Tuesdays at 21:55 for 32 episodes.

The historical drama depicts the life and loves of Yoo Jung, who is based on real-life 16th century historical figure Baek Pa-sun, renowned as the first female potter and porcelain artist in the Joseon period.

Baek's glazing skills were so prized, she was appointed as a china maker for the royal family. But her fame also attracted the attention of foreign invaders, and during the Japanese invasion in 1592, she was among the Korean artisans captured and forcibly taken to Japan and made to continue their craft there. Under Toyotomi Hideyoshi's orders to enrich Japanese arts and culture, Baek helped the advancement of many new types of pottery that would be claimed as Japanese works of art. She became well-respected in Japan, and there exists a shrine in the city of Arita dedicated to her.

== Plot ==
Gifted with natural talent and skill, Yoo Jung has the goal of becoming the top potter and porcelain artist of the Joseon period. Joseon was famous for its white porcelain, and Jung learns her craft in the porcelain workshop Bunwon (분원; 分院), government-subsidized kilns at Bunwon-ri, Gwangju, where ceramics is a mixture of art and science.

Jung later falls in love with Prince Gwanghae, who becomes a tragic king troubled by the various threats to his crown. Despite Gwanghae's deep love for Jung, he must let her go.

== Cast ==
=== Main characters ===
- Moon Geun-young as Yoo Jung/Yoo Tae Pyung
  - Jin Ji-hee as young Jung

She was born with an enhanced sense of smell, taste, hearing, sight and touch. She can see and tell apart excellent pottery from the rest. She uses all of her senses and talents to create brilliant pieces of pottery. She uses her sense of smell to choose the best clay material, she tastes the glaze used to make pottery to ensure it is of best quality, and when baking pottery, she relies on her acute sense of hearing to regulate temperature. Her delicate hands masterfully shape clay into a masterpiece. People say the God of Kiln entered her body when she was born inside a kiln. A skilled potter with an artistic soul and an unsurpassed gift for this craft. She is a woman who is not afraid of confrontation and has a quick-thinking mind.She wanted to become a blacksmith more than a potter, but her fate thought otherwise.Her ability to make a ceramic after one look was recognized by King Seungjo, and it isn't until her adoptive father dies that she vows to become the top potter in all of Joseon and trains to enter the Palace pottery department. She uses her talent and passion to overcome every obstacle in the pottery department and others' jealousy and the limitations of her gender. As a woman, she becomes the youngest potter in the department. She starts to make the ceremonial items used by the royal family as well as their personal use items. She engages in a head to head battle with her nemesis Lee Yook-do and in the end emerges victorious as the head of the department. Her name will forever remain in Joseon annals as one of the most prolific and decorated potters in history. But in the end, Jung falls into a trap set by mad jealous Lee Yook-do and became coveted by Japanese shogun Toyotomi Hideyoshi who wants her for her ceramic talent. Jung becomes the only one who can end the Japanese invasion, so she decides to sacrifice herself in order to end it. She goes abroad to Japan and there she creates the famed Joseon-era ceramic that will endure for generations in Japan.

- Lee Sang-yoon as Prince Gwanghae
  - Noh Young-hak as young Gwanghae

His name at birth was Hon. He later becomes the 15th king of the Joseon Dynasty but receives the lower title of Gun instead of the full title befitting a Joseon ruler. He had the gravitas of a ruler at a young age but his brilliance compelled his adversaries to block his path to the throne. Because his mother, the concubine, died while giving birth to him, his father King Seonjo partly blames him for this and they never form a close a bond. Gwanghae realized at an early age that training in the martial arts and excelling in academics would foment animosity towards him. While on a hunting trip with his father, he encounters Jung, his woman of destiny.

- Kim Bum as Kim Tae-do
  - Park Gun-woo as young Tae-do

It is as if Tae-do was born to protect Jung and be by her side. Jung has no mother so Tae-do treats her like his own sister. Tae-do helps his parents run their tavern and practice martial arts in his spare time. Then he spends the rest of his time looking after Jung. It's how his day goes. There has never been enough time in his day to be with Jung. He is a man who would readily give his life for Jung.From the son of a blacksmith to a military officer to a potter, that was the life this man was born to live. Handsome and talented at martial arts, he's also considerate and thoughtful, the perfect man. A righteous man who only says what is right and does what is right. He wields his strength against those who are stronger, and kneels down to the level of those who are weaker. His father was a blacksmith and he grew up with a tool in each hand. But he grew up to love the bow and arrow more than the hammer and chisel, and in the end he becomes a warrior. In his heart, there is only Jung. They grew up like siblings but the appearance of Gwanghae turns it into a love triangle. His skills catch the eye of Gwanghae and he comes a military officer, but his heart is conflicted between his liege and the woman he loves. In the palace, at times he act as a protector, at times as a lover, always staying by Jung's side.As Jung overcomes all the obstacles to become the top of the pottery department, he decides to give up on her thinking they could never have a happy ending. At this time, the Japanese invasion of Korea happens and the military personnel is called into action. Tae-do helps Gwanghae who is leading the troops and trying to govern, and helps save Jung who was captured as a hostage by the Japanese.He fights them but unfortunately, he is mortally wounded by the leader of ninjas and before he dies, he finally admits to Jung that she is the only woman he ever loved and the one who made his heart beat until his very last breath.

- Park Gun-hyung as Lee Yook-do
  - Oh Seung-yoon as young Yook-do

Yook-do is Jung's half-brother and the son of Lee Gang-chun, the head of the Sah-ong royal bureau. Born from a family of esteemed artisan potters, he is recognized as a talented potter at a young age. While most people think Lee Yook-do was born with talent, they do not know how much hard work and internal conflict was involved in the process. He spends hours every day at the spinning wheel making pottery.

- Seo Hyun-jin as Shim Hwa-ryung
  - Kim Ji-min as young Hwa-ryung

She spent her childhood with Jung and they grew up together. She dreams of becoming the first female ceramist in Joseon, but recognizes that she could never win against Jung since the latter is more talented than she is. Though she cannot make the pottery herself like Jung, she has excellent eye in distinguishing its artistic quality. As she later acquires money and power, she tries to grasp whatever she wants. She falls into a one-sided love for Tae-do, and becomes Jung's rival.

=== Supporting characters ===
- Jun Kwang-ryul as Lee Gang-chun

6th generation royal ceramist and Jung's biological father. His family is famous for making pottery. He is the guy that tries to stop Jung from becoming an artisan. He does anything for his son Yukdo. He later helps the Japanese to invade Korea but fails he later dies in the hands of the Japanese trying to defend Yukdo.

- Byun Hee-bong as Moon Sa-seung
- Lee Jong-won as Yoo Euldam
- Sung Ji-ru as Shim Jong-soo
- Jeong Bo-seok as King Seonjo
- Han Go-eun as Lady Kim (In Bin)
- Lee Kwang-soo as Prince Imhae
  - Lee In-sung as young Imhae
- Jang Gwang as Lee Pyung-ik
- Jang Hyo-jin as Ma-poong
- Song Ok-sook as Son Haeng-soo
- Choi Ji-na as Yeon-ok

== Ratings ==
Episode #	Original broadcast date	Average audience share			
Episode #	Original broadcast date	TNmS Ratings		AGB Nielsen	
Episode #	Original broadcast date	Nationwide	Seoul National Capital Area	Nationwide	Seoul National Capital Area
1	July 1, 2013	10.1%	11.1%	10.7%	12.3%
2	July 2, 2013	10.4%	11.7%	11.4%	11.3%
3	July 8, 2013	9.3%	10.5%	10.3%	11.4%
4	July 9, 2013	10.6%	11.9%	12.0%	12.8%
5	July 15, 2013	11.5%	13.3%	10.6%	11.7%
6	July 16, 2013	11.3%	13.7%	11.8%	13.3%
7	July 22, 2013	11.2%	13.4%	11.7%	12.6%
8	July 23, 2013	12.1%	15.1%	11.8%	12.4%
9	July 29, 2013	11.2%	13.7%	10.4%	11.6%
10	July 30, 2013	10.8%	13.4%	11.0%	11.5%
11	August 5, 2013	10.7%	13.6%	10.0%	11.2%
12	August 6, 2013	11.0%	14.4%	11.6%	13.0%
13	August 12, 2013	8.2%	10.5%	9.1%	10.3%
14	August 13, 2013	8.8%	10.9%	9.6%	10.8%
15	August 19, 2013	7.7%	9.6%	7.8%	9.4%
16	August 20, 2013	8.2%	10.3%	8.6%	9.8%
17	August 26, 2013	7.6%	8.7%	8.6%	9.9%
18	August 27, 2013	8.4%	10.3%	9.1%	10.9%
19	September 2, 2013	8.5%	9.7%	8.4%	9.7%
20	September 3, 2013	9.6%	11.5%	9.1%	10.4%
21	September 9, 2013	7.6%	8.9%	8.4%	9.4%
22	September 10, 2013	8.2%	9.1%	7.9%	9.1%
23	September 16, 2013	8.2%	9.9%	7.5%	8.7%
24	September 17, 2013	7.9%	8.5%	7.2%	7.8%
25	September 30, 2013	7.1%	8.2%	6.0%	7.2%
26	October 1, 2013	7.7%	8.8%	7.6%	8.4%
27	October 7, 2013	7.9%	9.2%	7.4%	9.0%
28	October 8, 2013	7.6%	8.5%	7.2%	7.7%
29	October 15, 2013	8.2%	9.3%	9.0%	10.3%
30	October 15, 2013	6.8%	8.2%	8.0%	9.5%
31	October 21, 2013	9.1%	11.0%	9.3%	10.4%
32	October 22, 2013	10.3%	12.1%	9.6%	10.6%
Average		9.2%	-	9.3%	10.4%

== Awards and nominations ==
Year	Award	Category	Recipient	Result
2013	6th Korea Drama Awards	Excellence Award, Actor	Lee Sang-yoon	Nominated
2013	6th Korea Drama Awards	Excellence Award, Actress	Seo Hyun-jin	Won
2013	MBC Drama Awards	Top Excellence Award, Actress in a Special Project Drama	Moon Geun-young	Nominated
2013	MBC Drama Awards	Excellence Award, Actor in a Special Project Drama	Lee Sang-yoon	Nominated
2014	9th Seoul International Drama Awards	Outstanding Korean Drama	Goddess of Fire	Nominated
2014	9th Seoul International Drama Awards	Outstanding Korean Actress	Moon Geun-young	Nominated
2014	9th Seoul International Drama Awards	Outstanding Korean Drama OST	Forever You - Bobby Kim	Nominated
2014	9th Seoul International Drama Awards	Outstanding Korean Drama OST	Tears Flow - Noel	Nominated

== Original soundtrack ==
1. 가랑 가랑
2. Tears Are Also Love (눈물도 사랑인 걸) - Baek A-yeon
3. Tears Flow (눈물이 흐른다) - Noel
4. Forever You (영원히 너를) - Bobby Kim
5. I Love You (사랑해) - Park Ji-min of 15&
6. Though I Close My Eyes (두눈을 감아도) - Lush
7. Monologue (혼잣말) - Kim Hyung-joong
8. 사기장의 운명
9. 행복한 정이
10. 외로운 군주
11. 뜨거운 마음
12. 사랑을 빚다
13. 환희
14. 꺼지지 않는 사랑
15. 인연을 빚다
16. 떨리는 손
17. 마음에 이는 바람
18. 불같은 사랑
19. 고독한 싸움
20. 불처럼 꽃처럼
21. 여자 사기장
22. 정이의 눈물
23. 운명
24. 분원 낭청 정이

== International broadcast ==
- It aired in Vietnam on HTV7 in November 2014 under the title "Nữ thần lửa".
- It aired in Sri Lanka on Rupavahini in 2015 and in 2021 under the title Sirimati Sittaravi(සිරිමැටි සිත්තරාවි) and was dubbed into Sinhalese.
- It aired in Thailand on Channel 3 in 2016 under the title Jung Yi Tamnan Sin Haeng Joseon (Thai: จองอีตำนานศิลป์แห่งโชซอน; literally: "Jung Yi, Legend Art of Joseon") and was dubbed into Thai.
