= Air City =

2007 South Korean television drama

- Promotional poster
- Also known as: Aero City
- Hangul: 에어시티
- RR: Eeositi
- MR: Eŏsit'i
- Genre: Romance; Drama; Action
- Written by: Lee Seon-hee; Lee Seo-yoon
- Directed by: Im Tae-woo
- Starring: Lee Jung-jae; Choi Ji-woo; Lee Jin-wook; Moon Jeong-hee
- Opening theme: "Fist 2 Fist"
- Ending theme: "All in Vain" by TVXQ
- Country of origin: South Korea
- Original languages: Korean; English; Mandarin Chinese
- No. of episodes: 16

Production
- Producer: Choi Won-suk
- Production locations: Incheon; Seoul
- Running time: 60 minutes
- Production companies: HB Entertainment; AStory

Original release
- Network: MBC TV
- Release: May 19 – June 8, 2007

Air City (Korean: 에어시티) is a 2007 South Korean television drama starring Lee Jung-jae, Choi Ji-woo, Lee Jin-wook and Moon Jeong-hee. It aired on MBC from May 19 to June 8, 2007, on Saturdays and Sundays at 21:40 (KST) for 16 episodes. The series revolves around the work and romance of four airport personnel, showing the inner workings of the airline industry.

It was shot almost entirely at the Incheon International Airport, and as research for the script, four writers interviewed over 200 airport personnel over a two-year stretch.

== Synopsis ==
Han Do-kyung (Choi Ji-woo) was especially scouted by the Incheon Airport director and willingly accepted one-third of the pay she was receiving in Singapore, to come back to Korea as the chief of operations of Incheon International Airport. She is level-headed, speaks five different languages, and remains cool and calm under all circumstances. However, Do-kyung lives with the emotional wounds caused by her estrangement from her sister, Yi-kyung (Lee Da-hee), who is a pilot.

Do-kyung's unflappability is put to the test when she meets rash National Intelligence Service agent Kim Ji-sung (Lee Jung-jae). Acting on instinct whenever he thinks national security is at stake, he often breaks rules and ruffles feathers on the job, bringing him into constant contact, and sometimes conflict, with Do-kyung. After being stationed at the airport, he encounters doctor Seo Myung-woo (Moon Jeong-hee), his ex-girlfriend who is now working at the airport clinic, with whom he parted on painful terms.

Meanwhile, another airport employee is Do-kyung's childhood friend Kang Ha-joon (Lee Jin-wook). Ha-joon is quick-tempered with a habit of talking aggressively due to the nature of his job with airport security, watching over thousands of surveillance cameras. But he has a good relationship with all the airport employees, even the cleaners, because of his kind personality. As he and Do-kyung renew their friendship, he becomes a strong source of support for her. His feelings for her quickly turn romantic, despite the complication of Do-kyung being his superior at work.

But Ha-joon's affections remain unrequited, because Ji-sung and Do-kyung, despite struggling with memories and misgivings from the past, find themselves falling for each other.

== Cast ==
=== Main ===
- Lee Jung-jae as Kim Ji-sung
- Choi Ji-woo as Han Do-kyung
- Lee Jin-wook as Kang Ha-joon
- Moon Jeong-hee as Seo Myung-woo

=== Supporting ===
- Park Tam-hee as Jang Nan-young
- Lee Da-hee as Han Yi-kyung, Do-kyung's younger sister
- Park Hyo-joo as Im Ye-won
- Kwon Hae-hyo as Min Byung-kwan, Do-kyung's boss
- Joo Sang-wook as Ahn Kang-hyun
- Kim Jun-ho as Noh Tae-man
- Kwon Young-jin as Kim Soo-chun
- Jang Yong as Lee Jae-mu, Ji-sung's boss
- Choi Ran as Choi Jung-hee
- Yoon Joo-sang as Chief Uhm
- Shin Shin-ae as Go Eun-ah
- Jung Jin-moo as Min-wook
- Lee Sang-yoon as Kim Jung-min, Do-kyung's first love
- Yoon Jong-hee
- Marco
- Lee Seon-ho
- Kim Yong-hee
- Seo Beom-shik
- Choi Jong-yoon
- Yeo Ho-min

== Ratings ==
Date	Episode	Nationwide	Seoul
2007-05-19	1	12.7% (8th)	14.1% (7th)
2007-05-20	2	10.8% (14th)	11.9% (11th)
2007-05-26	3	11.4% (7th)	11.9% (6th)
2007-05-27	4	12.6% (8th)	13.8% (7th)
2007-06-02	5	10.4% (9th)	10.5% (9th)
2007-06-03	6	10.8% (14th)	11.7% (11th)
2007-06-09	7	10.0% (11th)	10.9% (8th)
2007-06-10	8	11.1% (10th)	11.9% (7th)
2007-06-16	9	9.5% (9th)	10.1% (8th)
2007-06-17	10	10.9% (14th)	11.3% (10th)
2007-06-23	11	8.7% (15th)	9.0% (16th)
2007-06-24	12	10.4%	11.0% (17th)
2007-06-30	13	9.9% (13th)	10.6% (11th)
2007-07-01	14	11.0% (19th)	11.6% (16th)
2007-07-07	15	9.9% (16th)	10.4% (13th)
2007-07-08	16	9.4%	10.1% (18th)
Average		10.6%	11.3%

Source: TNS Media Korea

== International broadcast ==
Japanese entertainment film Dentsu Inc. bought the series' broadcast rights for reportedly ¥200 million. It aired on cable channel WOWOW starting October 26, 2007.

In Thailand, the drama aired dubbed into Thai under the title ปฏิบัติการรักเหินฟ้า (Patibutkan Rak Hernfha; lit. Love Sky Operation) on the Modernine TV beginning October 14, 2009.
