= One the Woman =

2021 South Korean romantic comedy

- Promotional Poster
- Hangul: 원 더 우먼
- RR: Won deo umeon
- MR: Wŏn tŏ umŏn
- Genre: Romantic comedy; Drama; Action; Mystery; Thriller; Suspense; Crime; Law
- Developed by: Studio S (planning); Wavve (production investment)
- Written by: Kim Yoon
- Directed by: Choi Hyeong-hun
- Starring: Lee Hanee; Lee Sang-yoon; Jin Seo-yeon; Lee Won-geun
- Composer: Jin Ha-di
- Country of origin: South Korea
- Original language: Korean
- No. of episodes: 16

Production
- Executive producers: Hong Seung-chang; Jo Young-hoon
- Producers: Han Jeong-han; Park Min-yeop; Park Seon-ah
- Running time: 70 minutes
- Production company: Gill Pictures

Original release
- Network: SBS TV
- Release: September 17 – November 6, 2021

One the Woman (Korean: 원 더 우먼) is a 2021 South Korean television series directed by Choi Hyeong-hun and written by Kim Yoon. It stars Lee Hanee in a dual role, Lee Sang-yoon, Jin Seo-yeon, and Lee Won-geun. The drama premiered on SBS TV on September 17, 2021, and aired every Friday and Saturday, at 22:00 (KST).

The series ended on November 6, 2021, after airing 16 episodes. The last episode achieved a viewership of 17.8%, about 3.2 million views, which was its highest nationwide ratings in its entire run.

== Synopsis ==
The life of Jo Yeon-joo (Honey Lee), a prosecutor with tough personality, changes completely after waking up from a coma and discovering that she suffers from amnesia caused by a car accident. She is mistaken for Kang Mi-na, a cold woman who looks just like her. Mi-na is the youngest daughter of Yumin Group and the second daughter-in-law of the Han family, owners of Hanju Group. Due to Kang Mi-na's illegitimate status, both her and her husband's family mistreat her. However, when Yeon-joo lives as Mi-na in the Han's household, she fights back against the family's mistreatment of her.

Han Seung-wook (Lee Sang-yoon) is a chaebol, who still cherishes his first love. He left South Korea because he wanted to avoid the savagery of a fight for inheritance, but comes back in order to discover the truth behind his father's sordid death. When he meets his first love by chance, he does not want to lose her again.

== Cast ==
=== Main ===
- Lee Hanee as Jo Yeon-joo / Kang Mi-na
  - Kim Do-yeon as young Jo Yeon-joo / Kang Mi-na
    - Lee Hwa-kyum as Kang Mi-na after plastic surgery / Kim Eun-jung
1. Jo Yeon-joo: 33 years old, a graduate from Seoul National University School of Law, she works at the Seoul Central District Prosecutors' Office. She worked hard on her own to lift her career from the bottom. Because she had to interact with gangsters from various countries, she endeavored to learn how to speak at least 4 languages. She is skilled in martial arts which she uses to subdue gangsters. Because of the harsh environment she grew up in, she developed a strong stamina and strength enabling her to withstand physical assaults that can be life-threatening to others.
2. Kang Mi-na: 34 years old, youngest and illegitimate daughter of Yumin Group and the second daughter-in-law of Hanju Group. Because of her illegitimate background, her family and her husband's family treat her like a maid. Unknown to them, Mi-na secretly probes their dark secrets to retaliate someday. In order to hide and help Yeon-joo while trying to expose Han Sung-hye, she undergoes plastic surgery and poses as Han Sung-hye's newly hired secretary, Kim Eun-jung
- Lee Sang-yoon as Han Seung-wook / Alex Chang
  - Kim Young-hoon as young Han Seung-wook

36 years old, a third-generation disgraced chaebol, he is the only son of Chairman Han's late brother and Kang Mi-na's former boyfriend. After being exiled by his uncle, he returns to South Korea to seek the truth behind his father's death and also to find his first love.

- Jin Seo-yeon as Han Seong-hye

38 years old, a talented businesswoman, she is the eldest daughter of Hanju Group and Kang Mi-na's sister-in-law. An ambitious and narcissistic heiress, she would do anything to get what she wants, including getting rid of people who she believes are standing on her way. When she was younger, she accidentally killed her uncle and hit Yeon-joo's grandmother when she ran away from the factory.

- Lee Won-keun as Ahn Yoo-jun

32 years old, Jo Yeon-joo's university friend, who comes from a wealthy background and works as a prosecutor at the Seopyeong District Prosecutors' Office. He has feelings for her.

=== Supporting ===
==== Hanju Group Family ====
- Song Won-seok as Han Seong-woon

34 years old, second son of Hanju Group, married to Kang Mi-na. However, due to his unhappy marriage with Kang Mi-na, he had an affair with a famous announcer, Park So-yi. However, after he meets Jo Yeon-joo he falls in love with her.

- Jeon Kuk-hwan as Han Young-sik

68 years old, the Chairman of Hanju Group, a leading conglomerate in South Korea. He is Kang Mi-na's father-in-law. He bribed and supported Ryu Seung-deok, which allows him to freely commit financial crimes.

- Na Young-hee as Seo Young-won

64 years old, Kang Mi-na's mother-in-law. She often abuses Kang Mi-na. However, when Yeon-joo lives with her, she became the main target of Yeon-joo's insults. One day, Kang Mi-na tells her the truth about her elder son's death.

- Song Seung-ha as Han Sung-mi

30 years old, Hanju Group's youngest daughter who disrespects Kang Mi-na. She is a vain heiress who only loves shopping and going to salons.

- Jo Yeon-hee as Heo Jae-hee

36 years old, first daughter-in-law of Hanju Group. She is a widow who always feels insecure about her son's future considering the absence of her husband, Han Seong-chan, who was one of the main heir of Hanju Group that was murdered by Han Seong-hye.

- Shin Seo-woo as Han Seon-woo

9 years old, Han Seong-chan and Heo Jae-hee's son, as well as the only grandchild of Hanju Group. He is pampered by his mother who wants him to be accepted as Hanju Group's heir even with the absence of his father.

==== People around Han Family ====
- Kim Chang-wan as Noh Hak-tae

A former prosecutor and the current head of Hanju Group's legal team, he was a close friend of Han Seung-wook's father.

- Ye Soo-jung as Kim Kyung-shin

Nicknamed "Director Kim", she is Hanju Group's housekeeper and a woman of great mystery. Later it is revealed that Seung-wook's grandfather entrusted some of his shares to her, which she uses to expel Han Young-sik and his family's influence in the group.

- Kim Bong-man as Jeong Do-woo

Loyal bodyguard and assistant of Han Seong-hye who helped her get rid of the evidence that she killed her uncle (Han Seung-wook's father) by burning down the Hanju fashion's factory. He bribed Jo Yeon-joo's father so that he would confess that he is the arsonist. He supports Han Seong-hye and all of her crimes because he was manipulated by her through his sickly sister.

- Jiyun Kim Huong as Trang

A Vietnamese maid who is able to speak Korean fluently but hid that fact in order to preserve her job at Hanju's household. Yeon-joo as Kang Mi-na always extracts information about Kang Mi-na and the Hanju group from her.

==== People around Jo Yeon-joo ====
- Kim Won-hae as Ryu Seung-deok

Jo Yeon-joo's senior and one of the Deputy Chiefs of the Seoul Central District Prosecutors' Office. Later in an episode, he is promoted to the Chief of the Seoul Central District Prosecutors' Office mainly due Hanju Group's influence. Jo Yeon-joo holds a grudge against him for hiding the fact that Hanju's heiress Han Seong-hye was involved in her grandmother's death.

- Jung In-gi as Kang Myung-guk

Jo Yeon-joo's father. He was a gangster who tried to change his ways because of his daughter. He was bribed by Hanju group to confess as the perpetrator of an arson in Hanju Fashion's factory that killed Han Seung-wook's father. Without Yeon-joo knowing, the money was used to pay for her law school tuition fee.

- Lee Gyu-bok as Wang Pil-gyu

A former gangster who worked under Myung Guk. He owns a sushi restaurant. At Yeon-joo's request, he helps victims retaliate against perpetrators who are not properly punished for their crimes. He was asked by Myung-guk to take care of Yeon-joo.

- Jo Dal-hwan as Choi Dae-chi

A former gangster and Wang Pil-gyu's right-hand man.

=== Others ===
- Park Jeong-hwa as Park So-yi

Han Seong-woon's mistress. She is an announcer for the Nine O'Clock News who got the job solely because of Seong-woon. Kang Mi-na knows about the affair but she keeps silent about it. However Yeon-joo (as Kang Mi-na) harshly humiliated her and Seong-woon.

- Kim Jae-young as Lee Bong-sik

A con artist that was chased by Jo Yeon-joo in order to impress her seniors and finding the truth on her grandmother's death which was happened at the same time with Hanju factory that made her father being jailed. He helped Kang Mi-na leave South Korea and go abroad to escape from her abusive families. He holds a list of conglomerate chairmen who buy his fake art pieces so those chairmen are able to bribe law enforcers using those art pieces or using them for money laundering. Due to his involvement with Han Young-sik, he is protected by Ryu Seung-deok.

- Hwang Young-hee as Kang Eun-hwa

Kang Mi-na's paternal aunt and the President of Yumin Foundation. She wants Mi-na (who is replaced by Yeon-joo) to be fired from being Yumin's president and heiress, even to the point supporting Hanju Group's attempt to acquire Yumin's hotel so that she can get the whole ownership of Yumin group for her own.

=== Special appearances ===
- Kim Nam-gil as male priest who leads to heaven. Lee Ha-nee previously worked with him in another action comedy drama The Fiery Priest
- Jin Seon-kyu as chicken delivery man. Lee Ha-nee previously worked with him in an action comedy film Extreme Job.
- Sung Byung-sook as Yeon-joo's grandmother
- Chun-sik

== Production ==
On December 30, 2020 Lee Sang-yoon and Kim Ah-joong were considered for the main leads of the series. Lee Sang-yoon confirmed his appearance, but Kim Ah-joong refused the offer.

On June 18, 2021, the line-up was announced. This is Honey Lee's first drama after SBS' 2019 hit, The Fiery Priest. Incidentally, she portrayed another corrupt prosecutor in that series for her character Jo Yeon-joo. EXID's Park Jeong-hwa also joined the cast.

On August 4, photos from the script reading were released.

== Original soundtrack ==
One the Woman

Soundtrack album by Various
- Released: November 6, 2021
- Genre: Soundtrack
- Languages: Korean; English
- Labels: Warner; SBS Contents Hub; Donuts Music N

=== One the Woman OST (Various Artist) ===
Released on November 6, 2021
No.	Title	Artist	Length
1.	"Ride a bike by guitar"	Soulman	3:39
2.	"Let me hug you"	Jungyup	3:23
3.	"Someday"	Chungha	3:22
4.	"Tell Me"	Minsu	3:37
5.	"Still in my heart"	Jo Jang-hyuk	3:17
6.	"So what"	Kim Chang-beom	2:47
7.	"Come Together"	Han Dong-Jun	2:38
8.	"Who Am I"	Ma Sang-woo	2:04
9.	"Dark Secret"	Jin Ha-di	2:31
10.	"Juggler"	Han Dong-Jun	3:29
11.	"Wonderous Accident"	Kim Chang-beom	2:40
12.	"First Love"	Lee Nyeom	2:15
13.	"Proud Girl"	Kim Eui-yong	1:02
14.	"Harmonica Noir"	Park Ji-hwan	2:06
15.	"Burst"	Ma Sang-woo	2:04
16.	"A Long Time"	Kim Chang-beom	3:10
17.	"Heartbeat"	Han Dong-Jun	4:57
18.	"That Day"	Ma Sang-woo	4:29
19.	"An Old Joke"	Kim Chang-beom	1:43
20.	"Bully"	Kim Chang-beom	2:21
21.	"Welcome to the Strange Sea World"	Han Dong-Jun	3:03
22.	"Stupid Brothers"	Jin Ha-di	1:07
23.	"Another No Plan"	Kim Chang-beom	1:58
24.	"SeeSaw Swings"	Han Dong-Jun	2:11
25.	"Conspire"	Ma Sang-woo	3:08
26.	"Don't Tickle Me"	Han Dong-Jun	3:42
27.	"Table Talk"	Kim Chang-beom	1:55
28.	"Can We Just Talk"	Han Dong-Jun	2:10
29.	"Curiosity"	Kim Chang-beom	1:33
30.	"Reminisce, Missed and Love"	Park Ji-hwan	2:15
31.	"Search"	Kim Eui-yong	1:27
32.	"A Prosecutor In Korea"	Ma Sang-woo	2:20
33.	"Two Mind's"	Kim Chang-beom	2:04
34.	"Childhood Memory"	Ma Sang-woo	3:17
35.	"No Problem"	Kim Chang-beom	3:24
36.	"The Magic Powder"	Han Dong-Jun	3:51
37.	"One Team"	Ma Sang-woo	1:36
38.	"Destiny"	Jin Ha-di	3:34
Total length:			1:42:00

=== Singles ===
Original soundtrack (Part 1-5)

Part 1

Released on September 24, 2021
No.	Title	Lyrics	Music	Artist	Length
1.	"Ride a bike by guitar" (기타로 오토바이를 타자)	Kim Chang-wan	Kim Chang-wan	Soulman	3:39
2.	"Ride a bike by guitar" (Inst.)		Kim Chang-wan		3:44
Total length:					7:22

Part 2

Released on October 1, 2021
No.	Title	Lyrics	Music	Artist	Length
1.	"Let me hug you" (안아줄게요)	Geuneu; Dike	Geuneu; Dike	Jungyup	3:23
2.	"Let me hug you" (Inst.)		Geuneu; Dike		3:23
Total length:					6:47

Part 3

Released on October 15, 2021
No.	Title	Lyrics	Music	Artist	Length
1.	"Someday"	CHIMMI	CHIMMI; Atomic	Chungha	3:22
2.	"Someday" (Inst.)		CHIMMI; Atomic		3:22
Total length:					6:44

Part 4

Released on October 23, 2021
No.	Title	Lyrics	Music	Artist	Length
1.	"Tell Me"	RGBY	RGBY	Minsu	3:37
2.	"Tell Me" (Inst.)		RGBY		3:38
Total length:					7:16

Part 5

Released on November 5, 2021
No.	Title	Lyrics	Music	Artist	Length
1.	"Still in my heart"	Son Ga-eul	Lee Tae-hoon (ELDORADO); Park Sang-hoon (ELDORADO); Lee Ki-hyun (ELDORADO); bK	Jo Jang-hyuk	3:17
2.	"Still in my heart" (Inst.)		Lee Tae-hoon (ELDORADO); Park Sang-hoon (ELDORADO); Lee Ki-hyun (ELDORADO); bK		3:17
Total length:					6:35

== Viewership ==
Audience response

One the Woman : South Korea viewers per episode (millions)

Season	Episode number																Average
Season	1	2	3	4	5	6	7	8	9	10	11	12	13	14	15	16	Average
1	1.509	1.304	2.562	2.538	2.498	2.483	2.857	2.598	2.624	2.673	2.507	2.331	3.013	2.976	3.055	3.235	2.547

Source: Audience measurement performed nationwide by Nielsen Korea.

Average TV viewership ratings
Ep.	Original broadcast date	Average audience share		
Ep.	Original broadcast date	Nielsen Korea		TNmS
Ep.	Original broadcast date	Nationwide	Seoul	Nationwide
1	September 17, 2021	8.2% (5th)	9.0% (4th)	8.1% (5th)
2	September 18, 2021	7.1% (7th)	8.0% (5th)	7.0% (6th)
3	September 24, 2021	12.7% (3rd)	13.2% (3rd)	10.6% (3rd)
4	September 25, 2021	12.6% (2nd)	12.7% (2nd)	10.8% (2nd)
5	October 1, 2021	13.4% (3rd)	14.6% (4th)	11.2% (3rd)
6	October 2, 2021	13.0% (2nd)	13.1% (2nd)	10.8% (2nd)
7	October 8, 2021	15.0% (2nd)	15.7% (1st)	12.5% (2nd)
8	October 9, 2021	13.5% (2nd)	13.9% (2nd)	11.5% (2nd)
9	October 15, 2021	14.0% (2nd)	15.1% (1st)	11.2% (3rd)
10	October 16, 2021	13.3% (2nd)	14.1% (2nd)	11.2% (2nd)
11	October 22, 2021	14.0% (2nd)	14.5% (1st)	11.6% (3rd)
12	October 23, 2021	12.5% (2nd)	13.4% (2nd)	10.1% (2nd)
13	October 29, 2021	16.0% (2nd)	16.9% (1st)	13.2% (3rd)
14	October 30, 2021	16.9% (2nd)	17.7% (2nd)	13.8% (2nd)
15	November 5, 2021	16.7% (1st)	17.2% (1st)	13.5% (2nd)
16	November 6, 2021	17.8% (2nd)	18.5% (2nd)	15.4% (2nd)
Average		13.54%	14.22%	11.41%
In this table, the blue numbers represent the lowest ratings and the red numbers represent the highest ratings.; NR denotes that the series did not rank in the top 20 daily programs on that date.; N/A denotes that the rating is not known.

== Awards and nominations ==
Name of the award ceremony, year presented, category, nominee of the award, and the result of the nomination
Award ceremony	Year	Category	Nominee	Result	Ref.
APAN Star Awards	2022	Top Excellence Award, Actress in a Miniseries	Lee Hanee	Nominated	
SBS Drama Awards	2021	Best Couple Award	Lee Sang-yoon & Lee Hanee	Nominated	
SBS Drama Awards	2021	Grand Prize (Daesang)	Lee Hanee	Nominated	
SBS Drama Awards	2021	Top Excellence Award, Actor in a Miniseries	Lee Sang-yoon	Won	
SBS Drama Awards	2021	Top Excellence Award, Actress in a Miniseries	Lee Hanee	Won	
SBS Drama Awards	2021	Excellence Award for an Actor in a Mini-Series Romance/Comedy Drama	Lee Won-keun	Nominated	
SBS Drama Awards	2021	Excellence Award for an Actress in a Mini-Series Romance/Comedy Drama	Jin Seo-yeon	Won	
SBS Drama Awards	2021	Best Supporting Actor in a Mini-Series Romance/Comedy Drama	Song Won-seok	Won	
SBS Drama Awards	2021	Best Supporting Actor in a Mini-Series Romance/Comedy Drama	Kim Won-hae	Nominated	
SBS Drama Awards	2021	Best Supporting Actress in a Mini-Series Romance/Comedy Drama	Na Young-hee	Nominated	
SBS Drama Awards	2021	Best Supporting Actress in a Mini-Series Romance/Comedy Drama	Ye Soo-jung	Nominated	
SBS Drama Awards	2021	Scene Stealer Award	Hwang Young-hee	Nominated	
SBS Drama Awards	2021	Best Character Award, Actor	Kim Chang-wan	Nominated	
SBS Drama Awards	2021	Best Supporting Team	One the Woman	Nominated	
