= Dal Soon's Spring =

South Korean soap opera

- Promotional poster
- Hangul: 꽃 피어라 달순아!
- RR: Kkot pieora Dalsuna!
- MR: Kkot p'iŏra Talsuna!
- Genre: Period drama Romance; Family drama Melodrama
- Written by: Moon Young-hoon
- Directed by: Shin Chang-suk
- Creative director: Lee Ung-hee
- Starring: Hong Ah-reum; Yun Da-yeong; Song Won-seok; Kang Dal-bin
- Country of origin: South Korea
- Original language: Korean
- No. of episodes: 129

Production
- Executive producer: Kim Sung-geun
- Producers: Lee Jung-mi; Nah Soo-ji
- Running time: 40 min
- Production company: KBS Drama Production

Original release
- Network: KBS2
- Release: August 14, 2017 – February 9, 2018

Dal Soon's Spring (Korean: 꽃 피어라 달순아!; lit. 'Blossom, Dal Soon!') is a 2017 South Korea morning soap opera starring Hong Ah-reum, Yun Da-yeong, Song Won-seok, and Kang Dal-bin. It aired on KBS2 from August 14, 2017 on Mondays to Fridays at 09:00 (KST) to 09:45 (KST).

It is the 43rd TV Novel series (12th in 2010s) of KBS. The time setting of this drama is among the earliest compared to the other series, starting years before the Pacific War in the Korean independence movement era.

== Plot ==
The story of a human drama about Dal-soon, who grew up knowing the enemy who killed his father as his father and was abandoned by him due to a tragedy of the times, who unravels the truth of his past and succeeds as a shoemaker.

== Cast ==
=== Main ===
- Hong Ah-reum as Go Dal-soon / Han Eun-sol
  - Uhm Chae-young as young Go Dal-soon / Han Eun-sol
- Yun Da-yeong as Han Hong-joo / Go Jung-ok
  - Choi Myung-bin as young Han Hong-joo / Go Jung-ok
- Song Won-seok as Jung Yoon-jae
  - Gil Jung-woo as young Jung Yoon-jae
- Kang Dal-bin as Seo Hyun-do
  - Choi Kwon-soo as young Seo Hyun-do

=== Supporting ===
==== Song-in Shoe ====
- Im Ho as Han Tae-sung
- Park Hyun-jung as Song Yeon-hwa
- Kim Min-hee as Han Tae-sook
- Park Ji-hoon as Dong-hoon

==== Hangang Leather ====
- Choi Jae-sung as Jung Sun-ki
- Jo Eun-sook as Seo Mi-ryung
- Hong Il-kwon as Seo Bong-sik
- Lee Min-ji as Seo Hyun-jung

==== People around Boon-yi ====
- Kim Young-ok as Kang Boon-yi
- Bae Do-hwan as Jung Chong-ki
- Choi Wan-jung as Ahn Choo-ja
- Jung Ha-yoon as Jung Bok-nam

=== Cameo appearance ===
- Jung Young-sook as Choi Geum-seon
- Choi Cheol-ho as Lee Jae-ha

== Ratings ==
- In this table, The blue numbers represent the lowest ratings and the red numbers represent the highest ratings.
- NR denotes that the drama did not rank in the top 20 daily programs on that date.

Ep.	Original broadcast date	Average audience share			
Ep.	Original broadcast date	TNmS Ratings		AGB Nielsen	
Ep.	Original broadcast date	Nationwide	Seoul	Nationwide	Seoul
1	August 14, 2017	9.7% (12th)	NR	7.1% (NR)	NR
2	August 15, 2017	8.1% (13th)	NR	7.1% (20th)	NR
3	August 16, 2017	8.6% (12th)	6.4% (18th)	6.9% (NR)	NR
4	August 17, 2017	9.3% (13th)	7.5% (12th)	7.3% (16th)	6.5% (17th)
5	August 18, 2017	9.2% (12th)	6.8% (14th)	7.2% (16th)	6.5% (17th)
6	August 21, 2017	9.0% (15th)	6.0% (19th)	6.7% (NR)	NR
7	August 22, 2017	8.5% (13th)	6.9% (19th)	6.4% (NR)	NR
8	August 23, 2017	8.8% (12th)	7.2% (16th)	7.1% (16th)	NR
9	August 24, 2017	9.5% (12th)	7.3% (15th)	7.2% (18th)	6.5% (20th)
10	August 25, 2017	9.0% (13th)	6.4% (18th)	7.3% (16th)	6.1% (19th)
11	August 28, 2017	8.7% (15th)	NR	6.8% (20th)	NR
12	August 29, 2017	9.4% (11th)	7.2% (16th)	7.1% (15th)	NR
13	August 30, 2017	9.2% (12th)	7.6% (13th)	6.2% (20th)	NR
14	August 31, 2017	9.1% (11th)	7.4% (14th)	6.7% (18th)	NR
15	September 1, 2017	8.8% (14th)	6.3% (15th)	7.2% (15th)	5.7% (17th)
16	September 4, 2017	9.5% (12th)	7.6% (16th)	7.2% (18th)	NR
17	September 5, 2017	7.2% (14th)	6.2% (15th)	5.8% (NR)	NR
18	September 6, 2017	8.7% (14th)	6.5% (17th)	6.4% (19th)	NR
19	September 7, 2017	7.8% (14th)	NR	6.0% (18th)	NR
20	September 8, 2017	8.6% (12th)	6.5% (13th)	6.8% (15th)	5.6% (19th)
21	September 11, 2017	11.0% (9th)	8.6% (14th)	7.5% (19th)	NR
22	September 12, 2017	7.3% (14th)	6.2% (18th)	6.0% (19th)	NR
23	September 13, 2017	7.8% (14th)	6.4% (15th)	5.7% (19th)	NR
24	September 14, 2017	8.2% (14th)	6.7% (18th)	5.8% (NR)	NR
25	September 15, 2017	8.4% (14th)	6.5% (16th)	7.1% (14th)	6.4% (17th)
26	September 18, 2017	8.2% (14th)	6.6% (19th)	6.2% (NR)	NR
27	September 19, 2017	8.3% (13th)	6.7% (19th)	6.8% (19th)	NR
28	September 20, 2017	8.3% (14th)	6.8% (16th)	6.1% (19th)	NR
29	September 21, 2017	8.1% (14th)	6.4% (17th)	6.7% (17th)	NR
30	September 22, 2017	8.2% (14th)	6.8% (14th)	7.0% (15th)	6.0% (18th)
31	September 25, 2017	9.2% (12th)	7.0% (18th)	7.0% (20th)	NR
32	September 26, 2017	6.9% (17th)	NR	5.5% (NR)	NR
33	September 27, 2017	9.7% (12th)	7.3% (14th)	7.9% (15th)	6.5% (18th)
34	September 28, 2017	7.7% (18th)	6.6% (20th)	7.2% (NR)	NR
35	September 29, 2017	8.7% (12th)	6.8% (12th)	7.5% (17th)	6.5% (16th)
36	October 2, 2017	7.8% (14th)	5.8% (20th)	7.0% (19th)	NR
37	October 3, 2017	7.8% (11th)	6.5% (10th)	6.8% (14th)	6.9% (13th)
38	October 5, 2017	8.1% (14th)	NR	6.5% (19th)	NR
39	October 6, 2017	8.3% (10th)	6.1% (18th)	7.0% (17th)	NR
40	October 9, 2017	9.7% (11th)	8.1% (18th)	7.7% (20th)	NR
41	October 10, 2017	8.5% (16th)	6.9% (20th)	7.0% (16th)	NR
42	October 11, 2017	9.5% (13th)	7.4% (17th)	7.3% (18th)	NR
43	October 12, 2017	9.2% (10th)	6.9% (16th)	6.4% (NR)	NR
44	October 13, 2017	8.1% (12th)	6.8% (13th)	6.6% (14th)	5.4% (19th)
45	October 16, 2017	9.3% (13th)	7.8% (16th)	6.8% (NR)	NR
46	October 17, 2017	10.0% (11th)	8.4% (11th)	6.9% (16th)	NR
47	October 18, 2017	9.3% (9th)	7.1% (17th)	6.9% (16th)	NR
48	October 19, 2017	8.5% (15th)	7.8% (17th)	6.6% (NR)	NR
49	October 20, 2017	8.2% (13th)	7.0% (13th)	6.7% (14th)	NR
50	October 23, 2017	9.9% (10th)	8.3% (12th)	7.6% (18th)	NR
51	October 24, 2017	9.0% (12th)	6.8% (14th)	7.6% (13th)	6.1% (17th)
52	October 25, 2017	10.4% (9th)	8.6% (11th)	7.1% (18th)	NR
53	October 26, 2017	10.1% (9th)	7.3% (12th)	7.3% (19th)	NR
54	October 27, 2017	9.7% (10th)	7.7% (11th)	7.8% (12th)	6.0% (16th)
55	October 30, 2017	8.8% (15th)	7.5% (19th)	7.6% (16th)	NR
56	October 31, 2017	9.7% (11th)	8.3% (11th)	7.4% (15th)	NR
57	November 1, 2017	9.7% (7th)	8.5% (7th)	6.7% (15th)	5.3% (18th)
58	November 2, 2017	8.4% (13th)	6.7% (17th)	6.2% (NR)	NR
59	November 3, 2017	9.0% (13th)	7.6% (12th)	7.1% (14th)	6.0% (17th)
60	November 6, 2017	8.4% (14th)	6.8% (19th)	7.2% (16th)	NR
61	November 7, 2017	9.3% (13th)	8.0% (10th)	7.6% (13th)	NR
62	November 8, 2017	10.3% (8th)	8.9% (7th)	7.9% (13th)	6.5% (15th)
63	November 9, 2017	9.4% (11th)	7.3% (17th)	7.8% (11th)	6.8% (14th)
64	November 10, 2017	8.8% (14th)	7.9% (12th)	8.2% (13th)	6.6% (14th)
65	November 13, 2017	8.6% (13th)	6.4% (17th)	6.8% (NR)	NR
66	November 14, 2017	9.1% (13th)	8.0% (10th)	7.0% (17th)	NR
67	November 15, 2017	10.3% (7th)	8.4% (8th)	6.5% (14th)	5.9% (16th)
68	November 16, 2017	10.3% (7th)	8.5% (11th)	8.5% (12th)	7.2% (18th)
69	November 17, 2017	9.3% (12th)	7.9% (13th)	7.7% (14th)	5.6% (20th)
70	November 20, 2017	10.0% (8th)	7.7% (13th)	8.5% (11th)	6.6% (15th)
71	November 21, 2017	10.6% (9th)	8.6% (9th)	7.7% (11th)	NR
72	November 22, 2017	10.2% (8th)	8.6% (9th)	7.7% (12th)	6.4% (18th)
73	November 23, 2017	9.3% (9th)	6.8% (19th)	8.0% (12th)	NR
74	November 24, 2017	10.6% (9th)	8.1% (11th)	8.0% (13th)	6.5% (17th)
75	November 27, 2017	10.3% (10th)	8.2% (11th)	7.8% (16th)	6.3% (20th)
76	November 28, 2017	10.0% (10th)	7.8% (12th)	8.0% (12th)	6.7% (14th)
77	November 29, 2017	8.8% (9th)	6.8% (13th)	7.1% (15th)	NR
78	November 30, 2017	10.6% (8th)	7.6% (13th)	9.2% (8th)	7.3% (17th)
79	December 1, 2017	9.9% (10th)	8.3% (11th)	8.3% (12th)	7.3% (13th)
80	December 4, 2017	9.3% (11th)	7.4% (15th)	7.3% (18th)	NR
81	December 5, 2017	9.6% (9th)	6.7% (14th)	7.8% (11th)	6.8% (19th)
82	December 6, 2017	9.6% (10h)	7.3% (13th)	6.8% (16th)	6.4% (19th)
83	December 7, 2017	10.4% (9th)	8.1% (11th)	7.6% (14th)	6.7% (19th)
84	December 8, 2017	10.5% (9th)	7.6% (14th)	8.1% (14th)	6.9% (17th)
85	December 11, 2017	9.2% (11th)	NR	8.0% (16th)	NR
86	December 12, 2017	9.7% (10th)	6.8% (14th)	9.0% (9th)	8.0% (12th)
87	December 13, 2017	9.0% (12th)	7.2% (16th)	7.9% (11th)	6.6% (18th)
88	December 14, 2017	10.7% (8th)	8.1% (9th)	8.3% (12th)	7.1% (17th)
89	December 15, 2017	10.3% (9th)	7.0% (16th)	8.4% (15th)	7.0% (18th)
90	December 18, 2017	11.1% (9th)	7.9% (14th)	8.7% (12th)	7.8% (16th)
91	December 19, 2017	10.9% (6th)	7.4% (12th)	8.6% (12th)	7.6% (16th)
92	December 20, 2017	9.3% (12th)	7.1% (13th)	7.6% (15th)	6.4% (19th)
93	December 21, 2017	12.7% (4th)	9.3% (6th)	9.6% (8th)	8.1% (10th)
94	December 22, 2017	10.4% (7th)	7.8% (12th)	9.9% (7th)	8.7% (10th)
95	December 25, 2017	9.1% (9th)	8.2% (10th)	8.1% (13th)	NR
96	December 26, 2017	11.3% (4th)	—N/a	9.3% (7th)	8.2% (9th)
97	December 27, 2017	11.1% (9th)	9.5% (6th)	8.2% (12th)	6.6% (18th)
98	December 28, 2017	11.6% (8th)	9.2% (9th)	10.9% (7th)	9.7% (6th)
99	December 29, 2017	10.8% (9th)	8.7% (10th)	9.6% (11th)	7.9% (14th)
100	January 1, 2018	9.8% (6th)	—N/a	8.2% (15th)	NR
101	January 2, 2018	12.3% (5th)	—N/a	10.2% (4th)	8.4% (9th)
102	January 3, 2018	12.3% (5th)	—N/a	9.6% (8th)	7.9% (13th)
103	January 4, 2018	12.6% (4th)	—N/a	10.2% (7th)	9.9% (9th)
104	January 5, 2018	13.0% (6th)	—N/a	10.5% (7th)	8.8% (11th)
105	January 8, 2018	12.0% (5th)	—N/a	9.9% (8th)	9.0% (12th)
106	January 9, 2018	12.0% (4th)	—N/a	10.3% (5th)	8.6% (10th)
107	January 10, 2018	13.5% (4th)	—N/a	10.1% (6th)	8.8% (9th)
108	January 11, 2018	13.4% (3rd)	—N/a	10.3% (8th)	8.9% (9th)
109	January 12, 2018	12.8% (5th)	—N/a	10.6% (10th)	8.9% (13th)
110	January 15, 2018	13.3% (4th)	—N/a	10.0% (7th)	8.4% (12th)
111	January 16, 2018	12.6% (4th)	—N/a	10.3% (5th)	8.6% (8th)
112	January 17, 2018	11.9% (5th)	—N/a	9.6% (7th)	7.9% (8th)
113	January 18, 2018	12.1% (4th)	—N/a	10.1% (6th)	8.8% (8th)
114	January 19, 2018	13.4% (4th)	—N/a	11.0% (6th)	9.5% (9th)
115	January 22, 2018	12.2% (5th)	—N/a	9.9% (7th)	8.1% (13th)
116	January 23, 2018	13.6% (4th)	—N/a	11.3% (5th)	9.8% (7th)
117	January 24, 2018	12.2% (6th)	—N/a	9.9% (10th)	8.1% (13th)
118	January 25, 2018	13.8% (5th)	—N/a	11.0% (8th)	9.6% (9th)
119	January 26, 2018	14.0% (5th)	—N/a	10.7% (10th)	8.7% (13th)
120	January 29, 2018	13.3% (5th)	—N/a	10.6% (9th)	8.9% (10th)
121	January 30, 2018	12.9% (6th)	—N/a	10.5% (7th)	8.3% (9th)
122	January 31, 2018	12.5% (7th)	—N/a	10.8% (9th)	9.2% (10th)
123	February 1, 2018	12.5% (9th)	—N/a	10.7% (10th)	8.9% (11th)
124	February 2, 2018	13.4% (6th)	—N/a	11.1% (9th)	9.6% (12th)
125	February 5, 2018	13.6% (6th)	—N/a	10.7% (10th)	8.3% (13th)
126	February 6, 2018	13.5% (5th)	—N/a	11.4% (5th)	9.3% (6th)
127	February 7, 2018	14.0% (6th)	—N/a	10.5% (10th)	9.0% (10th)
128	February 8, 2018	15.5% (2nd)	—N/a	12.0% (5th)	9.9% (6th)
129	February 9, 2018	13.7% (5th)	—N/a	11.6% (7th)	9.8% (9th)
Average		10.0%	%	8.1%	%

== Awards and nominations ==
Year	Award	Category	Nominee	Result
2017	31st KBS Drama Awards	Excellence Award, Actor in a Daily Drama	Im Ho	Nominated
2017	31st KBS Drama Awards	Excellence Award, Actress in a Daily Drama	Hong Ah-reum	Nominated
2017	31st KBS Drama Awards	Best New Actor	Song Won-seok	Nominated
2017	31st KBS Drama Awards	Best Young Actress	Uhm Chae-young	Nominated
