= Don't Cry My Love (TV series) =

- Promotional poster
- Genre: Family; Romance; Drama
- Written by: Park Jung-ran
- Directed by: Kim Sa-hyun; Lee Dong-yoon
- Starring: Lee Yu-ri; Lee Jung-jin; Oh Seung-hyun; Lee Sang-yoon
- Country of origin: South Korea
- Original language: Korean
- No. of episodes: 168

Production
- Executive producer: Song Jae-joon
- Producer: Lee Dae-young
- Production company: Pan Entertainment

Original release
- Network: Munhwa Broadcasting Corporation
- Release: November 12, 2008 – June 29, 2009

Don't Cry My Love (Korean: 사랑해, 울지마; RR: Saranghae, uljima; lit. I Love You, Don't Cry) is a family South Korean family drama series broadcast by MBC in 2008–2009 starring Lee Yu-ri, Lee Jung-jin, Oh Seung-hyun and Lee Sang-yoon. The daily drama aired on MBC on Mondays to Fridays at 20:15 from November 17, 2008 to May 22, 2009 for 132 episodes.

== Cast ==
Jo family

- Lee Yu-ri as Jo Mi-soo
- Kim Chang-sook as Moon Soo-ja (Mi-soo's mother)
- Kim Young-jae as Jo Tae-sub (Mi-soo's older brother)
- Kim Hyun-jung as Kim Hyun-joo (Tae-sub's wife)
- Lee Ah-hyun as Jo Mi-sun (Mi-soo's older sister)
- Kim Mi-sook as Moon Shin-ja (Mi-soo's aunt)
- Kang Boo-ja as Im Young-soon (Mi-soo's grandmother)
- Park Yoo-sun as Yoon-mi (Mi-sun's 7-year-old daughter)
- Kim Hwan-hee as Yoon-ji (Mi-sun's 5-year-old daughter)

Han family

- Lee Jung-jin as Han Young-min
- Lee Soon-jae as Han Kyu-il (Young-min's grandfather)
- Kim Mi-kyung as Han Young-ok (Young-min's aunt)
- Maeng Sang-hoon as Bae Dae-sung (Young-min's uncle in-law)
- Kim Jin-seong as Han Joon (Young-min's 6-year-old son)

Min family

- Oh Seung-hyun as Min Seo-young
- Park Young-ji as (Seo-young's father)

Jang family

- Lee Sang-yoon as Jang Hyun-woo
- Lee Mi-young as Lee Young-sun (Hyun-woo's mother)
- Choi Sang-hoon as (Hyun-woo's father)

Extended cast

- Jang Young-nam as Oh Jung (Young-min's colleague)
- Lee Shi-hwan as Park Hee-jun (Seo-young's friend)
- Kim Yoo-mi as Jae-hee (Joon's mother / Young-min's ex-girlfriend) (cameo)
- Marco as Pablo (Nepalese laborer)
- Ryu Si-hyun as Yoo In-young (Young-min's college friend)
