= Black Money (film) =

2019 South Korean crime film

- Theatrical release poster
- Hangul: 블랙머니
- RR: Beullaek meoni
- MR: Pŭllaek mŏni
- Directed by: Chung Ji-young
- Screenplay by: Han Hyun-geun
- Produced by: Lee Jong-ho; Lee Tae-kwan
- Starring: Cho Jin-woong; Lee Hanee
- Cinematography: Kim Hyung-suk
- Edited by: Kim Sang-Bum
- Music by: Shin Min
- Production companies: Zealarabi-Pictures; Aura Pictures
- Distributed by: Acemaker Movieworks
- Release date: November 13, 2019
- Running time: 113 minutes
- Country: South Korea
- Language: Korean
- Box office: US$16.2 million

Black Money (Korean: 블랙머니) is a 2019 South Korean crime drama film directed by Chung Ji-young, starring Cho Jin-woong and Lee Hanee. The film was loosely based on the sale of the Korean Exchange Bank to the American equity firm Lone Star Funds.

== Synopsis ==
Yang Min-hyuk (Cho Jin-woong) works as a prosecutor for the Seoul District Prosecutor's Office. He deals with case involving Park Soo-kyung (Lee Eun-woo), an employee of Daehan Bank, who bumped into multiple cars on the freeway. Days later, Park Soo-kyung is found dead. Prior to her death, her last text message was sent to her younger sister. She claimed that she was sexually assaulted by Prosecutor Yang. Her death is then ruled a suicide, and Min-hyuk attempts to clear his name. With his investigation, he soon learns that Park Soo-kyung was murdered, and she was also a witness to the sale of Daehan Bank for an unusually low price. Min-hyuk also encounters Kim Na-ri (Lee Hanee). She works as an attorney for Daehan Bank. A massive financial corruption case stands in front of Min-hyuk.

== Cast ==
- Cho Jin-woong as Yang Min-hyuk
- Lee Hanee as Kim Na-ri
- Lee Geung-young as Lee Kwang-joo
- Kang Shin-il as Investigator Jang
- Choi Deok-moon as Seo Kwon-young
- Jo Han-chul as Kim Nam-kyu
- Heo Sung-tae as Prosecutor Choi
- Yoon Byung-hee as Investigator Park
- Seo Hyun-chul as Im Seung-man
- Nam Myeong-ryeol as Na-ri's father.
- Jung Min-sung as PD Oh
- Kim Jong-tae as PD Yoon
- Lee Eun-woo as Park Soo-kyung
- Lee Sung-min as Choi Yong-wook
- Moon Sung-keun as Kang Ki-choon
- Jung In-gi as Priest
- Lee Jae-yong as CEO of broadcasting company
- Ryu Seung-soo as Lead Deputy Choi
- Teo Yoo as Steve Jung

== Release ==
The film premiered in South Korean cinemas on November 13, 2019. It was invited to open the 18th Florence Korea Film Fest in September 2020.

== Reception ==
=== Critical response ===
The film received mostly mixed reviews from critics. Praise was given to acting performances, while the plot felt a bit formulaic and shallow.

Yoon Min-sik from The Korea Herald wrote, "The film is justified in taking liberties and assuming all the allegations in the real-life case are true, given that it is, after all, a film. What I do have a problem with is how it tells the story. It uses a lot of cliches and a predictable plot to introduce very one-dimensional characters who are clearly meant to be just evil."

William Schwartz from HanCinema wrote, "Both Cho Jin-woong and Lee Hanee manage to put in surprisingly convincing performances as they slowly come to realize there are much bigger ethical issues at play than the ones that caused them to get involved in the case. Unfortunately, the formulaic construction of the script becomes especially grating near the end, where epic musical cues punctuate a theatrical set piece wherein incriminating documents are disseminated to an angry mob."

=== Box office ===
On its opening day, the film finished first place at the box office by attracting 111,661 moviegoers. After five days of strong performance, the film surpassed 1 million admissions on November 17. During its opening weekend, the film topped box office with US$5.3 million gross from 627,000 attendance. On November 28, 16 days after its release, the film surpassed 2 million admissions.

As of June 20, 2022, the film attracted 2,480,257 moviegoers with US$16.2 million gross.

== Awards and nominations ==
Year	Award	Category	Recipient(s)	Result	Ref.
2020	56th Baeksang Arts Awards	Best Director	Chung Ji-young	Nominated	
2020	25th Chunsa Film Art Awards	Best Director	Chung Ji-young	Nominated	
2020	56th Grand Bell Awards	Best Director	Chung Ji-young	Nominated	
2021	40th Golden Cinema Film Festival	Best Director	Chung Ji-young	Won	
2021	40th Golden Cinema Film Festival	Best Actor	Cho Jin-woong	Won	
2021	40th Golden Cinema Film Festival	Best Actress	Lee Hanee	Won	
