= Park Hyo-joo =

South Korean actress (born 1982)

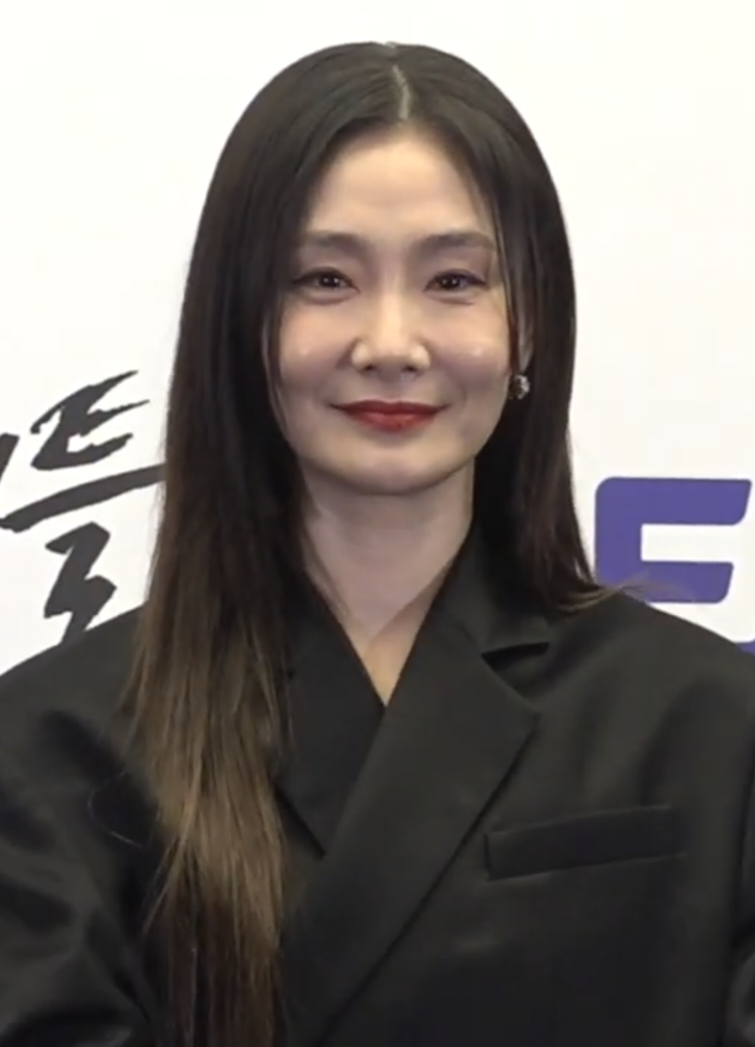
- Park in May 2023
- Born: October 8, 1982 (age 44); Busan, South Korea
- Other name: Park Hyo-ju
- Education: Dongduk Women's University - Broadcasting and Entertainment
- Occupation: Actress
- Years active: 2001–present

Korean name
- Hangul: 박효주
- RR: Bak Hyoju
- MR: Pak Hyoju

Park Hyo-joo (Korean: 박효주; born October 8, 1982) is a South Korean actress. She is best known for her leading role in the period police procedural Chosun Police Season 1 (also known as Byeolsungeom), as well as her supporting roles in the hit film Punch, and the television series Air City, Girl K, and The Chaser.

== Filmography ==
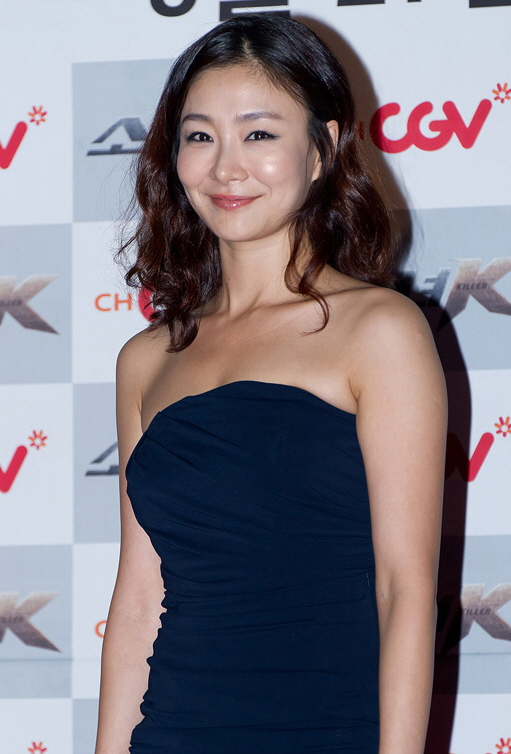
Park in 2011

=== Film ===
Year	Title	Role
2001	A Day	Ambulance nurse
2002	Conduct Zero	Princess Oh
2003	Crazy First Love	Indifferent woman
2003	Spring Breeze	Yoo-na ("dabang" coffee shop girl 1)
2004	Mr. Gam's Victory	Shin Hye-young
2005	Redeye	Soo-jin
2007	The Elephant on the Bike	Yoo-ri
2008	The Chaser	Detective Oh Eun-shil
2009	Fortune Salon	Soo-jung (female of couple)
2009	I Am Happy	Nurse Young-sook
2009	Secret	Hye-jin
2011	Meet the In-Laws	Jin-kyung
2011	Punch	Lee Ho-jeong
2013	48m	Park Seon-hee
2013	The Flu	Teacher Jung
2013	The Five	Hye-jin
2014	Tazza: The Hidden Card	Little Madam
2015	The Classified File	Gong Gil-yong's wife
2015	Love Guide for Dumpees	Joo-yeon
2016	No Tomorrow	Lee Hye-ri
2017	Blue Busking	Hye-Kyung
2018	The Pension	Mi-kyung
2022	Delusion	Hyun-woo
2023	Road to Boston	Yoon-seo
TBA	The Desperate Chase	Yang Se-ra

=== Television series ===
Year	Title	Role	Notes/Ref.
2003	Garden of Eve	Choi Mi-so	
2004	Sunlight Pours Down	Seung-ok	
2004	MBC Best Theater: "Indie Via"		
2004	Drama City: "What Should I Do?"	Kyung-ja	one act-drama
2005	Hello My Teacher		
2006	Thank You, My Life	Ga-eul	
2006	A Woman's Choice	So Mi-na	
2007	Air City	Im Ye-won	
2007	Drama City: "I'm a Very Special Lover"	Kim Hong	one act-drama
2007	Chosun Police 1	Yeo-jin	
2009	Ja Myung Go	Chi-so	
2010	My Country Calls	Agent Park Se-mi	
2011	Girl K	Min Ji-young	
2012	The Strongest K-Pop Survival	Team leader Han Jung-eun	
2012	The Chaser	Detective Jo	
2012	KBS Drama Special: "The Great Dipper"	Choi Jae-hee	
2014	I Need Romance 3	Lee Min-jung	
2014	Triangle	Kang Jin	
2014	Flower Grandpa Investigation Unit	Jeon Hye-jin	
2014	Secret Door	Woon-shim	
2014	Second 20s	Kim Yi-jin	
2016	Wanted	Yeon-Woo-Shin	
2018	You Drive Me Crazy	Lee Hyun-ji	
2018	Quiz of God 5: Reboot	Moon Soo-an	
2019	The Wind Blows	Jo Mi-kyeong	
2019	Chief of Staff	Lee Ji-eun	Season 2
2020–2023	Dr. Romantic	Shim Hye-jin	season 2; Cameo (Season 3, episode 15–16)
2021	Racket Boys	Shin Phil-ja	
2021–2022	Now, We Are Breaking Up	Jeon Mi-sook	
2022	O'PENing: "The Apartment Is Beautiful"	Seo Hee-jae	one act-drama
2022	The Good Detective 2	Hye-ok	Season 2; Cameo (Eps 5)
2022	Under the Queen's Umbrella	Nursemaid	Cameo (Eps 14)
2023	Battle for Happiness	Oh Yu-jin	
2023	Revenant	Yeom Hae-sang's mother	Cameo (Eps 2)

=== Variety show ===
Year	Title	Notes/Ref.
2021	Woman Plus	Host

=== Music video appearances ===
Year	Song title	Artist
2002	"지금은 헤어져도"	Jeon So-young
2003	"Runaway"	BMK

== Theater ==
Year	Title	Role
2005	Though His Name Is Forgotten...	
2005–2006	Oh Dong-pal's Youth	
2008	From Cheongsanri Until Gwanghwamun	Woman
2009	From Cheongsanri Until Gwanghwamun	Woman
2010–2011	Mr. Moon, You Are Truly Pretty	Firefly Flower
2013	Lemon	Lee Seon-mi

== Awards and nominations ==
Name of the award ceremony, year presented, category, nominee of the award, and the result of the nomination
Award ceremony	Year	Category	Nominee / Work	Result	Ref.
Blue Dragon Film Awards	2012	Best Supporting Actress	Punch	Nominated	
Monte-Carlo Television Festival	2008	Outstanding Actress in a TV series	Chosun Police Season 1	Nominated	
SBS Drama Awards	2012	New Star Award	The Chaser	Won	
SBS Drama Awards	2021	Best Supporting Actress in a Mini-Series Romance/Comedy Drama	Now, We Are Breaking Up	Won	
