= Battle for Happiness =

2023 South Korean television series

- Promotional poster
- Hangul: 행복배틀
- Hanja: 幸福배틀
- Lit.: Happiness Battle
- RR: Haengbokbaeteul
- MR: Haengbokpaet'ŭl
- Genre: Suspense thriller; Mystery
- Based on: Happiness Battle by Joo Young-ha
- Developed by: KT Studio Genie (planning)
- Written by: Joo Young-ha
- Directed by: Kim Yoon-cheol
- Starring: Lee El; Jin Seo-yeon; Cha Ye-ryun; Park Hyo-joo; Woo Jung-won
- Music by: Lee Kyung-sik
- Country of origin: South Korea
- Original language: Korean
- No. of episodes: 16

Production
- Executive producer: Kim Hyun-jung
- Producers: Kim Hyun-cheol; Lee Hee-won; Moon Bo-mi
- Running time: 70 minutes
- Production company: HB Entertainment

Original release
- Network: ENA
- Release: May 31 – July 20, 2023

Battle for Happiness (Korean: 행복배틀) is a 2023 South Korean television series starring Lee El, Jin Seo-yeon, Cha Ye-ryun, Park Hyo-joo, and Woo Jung-won. Based on screenwriter Joo Young-ha's own novel of the same title, it deals with a murder case among upper class mothers. It aired on ENA from May 31 to July 20, 2023, every Wednesday and Thursday at 21:00 (KST) for 16 episodes. It is also available for streaming on Amazon Prime Video in selected regions.

== Synopsis ==
The series is about mothers who are engaged in fierce social media competitions to destroy each other's happiness for their own. When one of their group dies mysteriously, a bigger battle thus unfolds as one among them wants to hide the truth, while another wants to reveal it.

== Cast ==
=== Main ===
- Lee El as Jang Mi-ho: a rational person who is the assistant manager of a bank's marketing team.
- Jin Seo-yeon as Song Jung-ah: founder and CEO of Inner Spirit, a beauty functional food company.
- Cha Ye-ryun as Kim Na-young: an influencer who grew up in a wealthy family.
- Park Hyo-joo as Oh Yu-jin: a full-time housewife who displays the life of a perfect mother and wife on social media.
  - Ha Seon-ho as young Oh Yu-jin
- Woo Jung-won as Hwang Ji-ye: an ordinary working mother.

=== Supporting ===
- Lee Kyu-han as Kang Do-joon: Yu-jin's husband who is a dentist.
- Son Woo-hyeon as Lee Jin-seop: assistant manager of the SNS marketing team of a bank's digital division.
- Kim Young-hoon as Lee Tae-ho: Na-young's husband who is a lawyer.
- Lee Je-yeon as Jung Soo-bin: Jung-ah's husband who is the president of Inner Spirit.
- Moon Hee-kyung as Im Kang-suk: Mi-ho's mother.

=== Extended ===
- Kim Hee-jae as Jo A-ra: a teaching assistant at Herinity English Kindergarten.
- Cha Hee as Lee So-min: mother of a 7-year-old girl.
- Park Na-eun as Baek Sung-hee
- Seo Byeok-jun as Song Jung-sik: Jung-ah's younger brother.
- Kim Joong-don as Bae Chang-hoon: a detective.
- Kim Ha-eon as Min-seong: Jung-ah and Soo-bin's son.
- Han Seo-hee as A-rin: Na-young and Tae-ho's daughter.
- Noh Ha-yeon as Ji-yul: Yu-jin and Do-joon's daughter.
- Heo Yul as Ha-yul: Yu-jin and Do-joon's daughter.
- Kim Seo-ah as So-won: Ji-ye's daughter.
- Park Jong-moo as Seo Kyung-joon: Mi-ho and Jin-seop's team leader.
- Nam Myeong-ryeol as Yu-jin's father-in-law
- Ryu Seung-moo as Gong Chang-hyun: Jung-ah's henchman.
- Yoo Hyun-jong as Han Joon-kyung: Jung-ah's secretary.

=== Special appearances ===
- Um Hyo-sup as Yu-jin's father
- Bae Seul-ki as Im Da-eun

== Viewership ==
Battle for Happiness : South Korea viewers per episode (thousands)

Season	Episode number																Average
Season	1	2	3	4	5	6	7	8	9	10	11	12	13	14	15	16	Average
1	N/A	N/A	N/A	233	305	402	371	377	397	480	445	465	429	589	373	476	N/A

Source: Audience measurement performed nationwide by Nielsen Korea.

Average TV viewership ratings
Ep.	Original broadcast date	Average audience share (Nielsen Korea)	
Ep.	Original broadcast date	Nationwide	Seoul
1	May 31, 2023	0.701% (30th)	N/A
2	June 1, 2023	0.927% (14th)	1.104% (7th)
3	June 7, 2023	0.821% (18th)	N/A
4	June 8, 2023	1.171% (6th)	1.616% (3rd)
5	June 14, 2023	1.356% (7th)	1.599% (5th)
6	June 15, 2023	2.011% (3rd)	2.647% (3rd)
7	June 21, 2023	1.701% (5th)	1.973% (4th)
8	June 22, 2023	1.710% (5th)	1.850% (4th)
9	June 28, 2023	1.979% (3rd)	2.333% (3rd)
10	June 29, 2023	2.254% (4th)	2.734% (3rd)
11	July 5, 2023	1.944% (3rd)	2.437% (3rd)
12	July 6, 2023	2.284% (3rd)	2.622% (3rd)
13	July 12, 2023	1.989% (3rd)	2.218% (3rd)
14	July 13, 2023	2.770% (3rd)	3.304% (3rd)
15	July 19, 2023	2.064% (3rd)	2.512% (3rd)
16	July 20, 2023	2.622% (2nd)	3.342% (2nd)
Average		1.769%	— (Note: Due to some unpublished ratings, the exact average rating is unknown.)
In the table above, the blue numbers represent the lowest published ratings and the red numbers represent the highest published ratings.; N/A denotes ratings that were not published.; This series aired on a cable channel/pay TV which normally has a relatively smaller audience compared to free-to-air TV/public broadcasters (KBS, SBS, MBC and EBS).
