= Song Won-seok =

South Korean actor

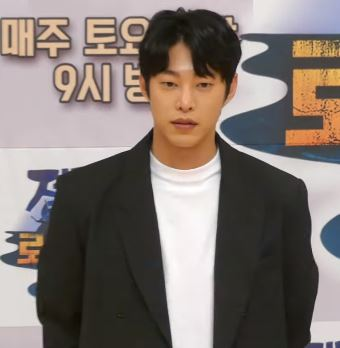
- Song in May 2019
- Born: Seoul, South Korea
- Occupation: Actor
- Years active: 2012–present
- Agent: Starhaus Entertainment

Korean name
- Hangul: 송원석
- RR: Song Wonseok
- MR: Song Wŏnsŏk

Stage name
- Hangul: 고욱
- RR: Go Uk
- MR: Ko Uk
- Website: Official website

Song Won-seok (Korean: 송원석), is a South Korean actor. He is best known for his roles in television series Lovers of the Red Sky (2021), One the Woman (2021), and Business Proposal (2022).

== Filmography ==
=== Television series ===
Year	Title	Role	Ref.
2012	Arang and the Magistrate	Seok a Chugi	
2014	Bad Guys		
2016	Entourage	a model (cameo)	
2017	First Love Again		
2017	My Father Is Strange	Park Young-hee	
2017	Dal Soon's Spring	Jung Yoon-jae	
2018	Switch	Kim Hyun-wook	
2018	Sweet Office	Jeong Hae-pyeong	
2019	Left-Handed Wife	Lee Soo-ho	
2019	My Only One	Lee Tae-pung	
2019	Joseon Survival Period	Im Kkeokjeong	
2019	Never Twice	Kim Woo-jae	
2020	Lonely Enough to Love	cameo	
2021	Lovers of the Red Sky	Moo-yeong	
2021	One the Woman	Han Seong-woon	
2022	Business Proposal	Lee Min-woo	
2024	No Gain No Love	Ahn Woo-jae	

=== Television shows ===
Year	Title	Role	Ref.
2016	Time Out	Participant	
2016	Saturday Night Live Korea Season 7	Cast member	
2019	Law of the Jungle in Lost Jungle & Island	Participant	

=== Web shows ===
Year	Title	Role	Ref.
2022	Pink Lie	Host	

== Awards and nominations ==
Name of the award ceremony, year presented, category, nominee of the award, and the result of the nomination
Award ceremony	Year	Category	Nominee / Work	Result	Ref.
KBS Drama Awards	2017	Best New Actor	Dal Soon's Spring	Nominated	
SBS Drama Awards	2021	Best Supporting Actor in a Miniseries Romance/Comedy Drama	One the Woman	Won	
