= Jin Seo-yeon =

South Korean television and film actress

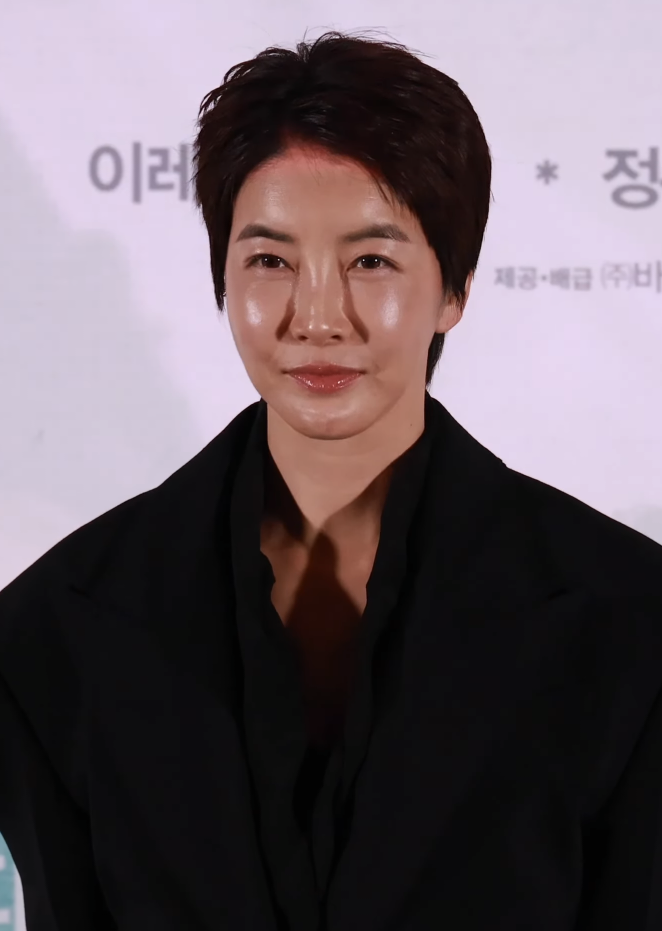
- Jin in February 2025
- Born: Kim Jeong-sun; January 18, 1983 (age 43)
- Other name: Ha Yun
- Education: Graduated in Broadcasting and Entertainment
- Alma mater: Dongduk Women's University, Department of Broadcasting and Entertainment
- Occupation: Actress
- Years active: 2007–present
- Agent: Andmarq

Korean name
- Hangul: 진서연
- RR: Jin Seoyeon
- MR: Chin Sŏyŏn

Jin Seo-yeon (Korean: 진서연; born 18 January 1983) is a South Korean actress. She made her acting debut in 2007 in film Eve's Temptation - Good Wife, since then, she has appeared in number of films and television series. She got recognition for her supporting roles in Manny (2011), Passionate Love (2013), Tell Me What You Saw (2020) and One the Woman (2021). She has acted in films such as: Romantic Island (2008) and Believer (2018), for which she won two Best Supporting Actress awards and five nominations in seven different award ceremonies.

== Career ==
Jin Seo-yeon studied at Dongduk Women's University for her graduation in Broadcasting and Entertainment. She debuted in the 2007 film Eve's Love- Good Wife and drama series Medical Gibang Cinema aired on OCN.

In 2018, she appeared in film Believer as Bo-ryeong, portraying Chinese-Korean drug lord's eccentric girl friend, for which she won two Best Supporting Actress awards and five nominations in seven different award ceremonies.

In 2021, she was cast in SBS TV series One the Woman as Han Seong-hye, a talented businesswoman of Hanju Group. Her portrayal won her Excellence Award, Actress in a Miniseries at 2021 SBS Drama Awards.

== Filmography ==
=== Films ===
Year	Title	Role	Notes	Ref.
2007	Eve's Temptation — Good Wife	In-ae		
2008	Romantic Island	Sandra		
2012	Love 911	Ha-yoon		
2018	Believer	Bo-ryeong		
2022	Yaksha: Ruthless Operations	Ryun-hee		
2022	Landmine		Short film	
2022	Limit	Yeon-joo		
2023	It's Okay!	Seol-ah		

=== Television series ===
Year	Title	Role	Notes	Ref.
2007	New Heart	Han Soo-jin		
2008	Korean Ghost Stories	Woman	Segment: Returning Lady	
2010	More Charming By The Day	Ha Yoon		
2011	Manny	Shin Gi-roo		
2012-13	Passionate Love	Kang Moon-hee		
2013	Empire of Gold	Jeong Yu-jin		
2013	Make Your Wish	Choi Seo-jin	Special appearance	
2015	Shine or Go Crazy	Geum Soon		
2015	Eve's Love	Jin Hyeon-ah		
2020	Tell Me What You Saw	Hwang Ha-young		
2021	One the Woman	Han Seong-hye		
2023	Battle for Happiness	Song Jung-ah		
2024	Family Matters	Ahn So-Jin		
2026	Our Universe	Amy Chu / Chu Ui-jeong		

=== Television shows ===
Year	Title	Role	Notes	Ref.
2023–present	Stars' Top Recipe at Fun-Staurant	Cast Member		
2024	Iron Girls	Cast member		

=== Music video appearances ===
Year	Song title	Artist	Notes	Ref.
2019	"Love Drunk"	Epik High	with Lee Ji-eun	

== Theatre ==
Theater play performances
Year	Title		Role	Theater	Date	Ref.
Year	English	Korean	Role	Theater	Date	Ref.
2008–2009	Closer	클로저	Subin	December 5 to February 8	CJ Ajit Daehak-ro (formerly SM Art Hall)	
2024	Closer	클로저	Anna	Plus Theater	April 23 to July 14	

== Accolades ==
=== Awards and nominations ===
Awards	Year	Category	Work	Result	Ref.
Baeksang Arts Awards	2019	Best Supporting Actress Film	Believer	Nominated	
Blue Dragon Film Awards	2018	Best Supporting Actress	Believer	Nominated	
27th Buil Film Awards	2018	Best Supporting Actress	Believer	Nominated	
Chunsa Film Art Awards	2019	Best Supporting Actress	Believer	Nominated	
Grand Bell Awards	2018	Best Supporting Actress	Believer	Won	
Korea Best Star Awards	2018	Best Supporting Actress	Believer	Won	
Korean Film Writers Association Awards	2018	Best Supporting Actress	Believer	Won	
SBS Drama Awards	2021	Excellence Award for an Actor in a Mini-Series Romance/Comedy Drama	One the Woman	Won	
The Seoul Awards	2018	Best Supporting Actress	Believer	Nominated	

=== Listicles ===
Name of publisher, year listed, name of listicle, and placement
Publisher	Year	Listicle	Placement	Ref.
Korean Film Council	2021	Korean Actors 200 (Note: Introduces 200 actors that best represent the present and future of Korean cinema to the people in the film industry all over the world.)	Included	
