= Can This Love Be Translated? =

2026 South Korean television series

- Promotional poster
- Also known as: Love in Translation
- Hangul: 이 사랑 통역 되나요?
- RR: I sarang tongyeok doenayo?
- MR: I sarang t'ongyŏk toenayo?
- Genre: Romantic comedy
- Written by: Hong Jung-eun; Hong Mi-ran
- Directed by: Yoo Young-eun
- Starring: Kim Seon-ho; Go Youn-jung; Sota Fukushi; Lee E-dam; Choi Woo-sung
- Music by: Choi In-hee
- Country of origin: South Korea
- Original language: Korean
- No. of episodes: 12

Production
- Executive producers: Choi Jin-hee; Kim Jin-yi; Park Joo-yeon
- Producers: Lee Yong-soo; Lee Hyung-young
- Production locations: South Korea; Japan; Canada; Italy
- Cinematography: Keeha Choi; Kim Young-jin
- Editor: Kim Hyang-sook
- Running time: 56–82 minutes
- Production companies: Studio Sot; Trii Studio; Imaginus

Original release
- Network: Netflix
- Release: January 16, 2026

Can This Love Be Translated? (Korean: 이 사랑 통역 되나요?) is a South Korean romantic comedy television series written by the Hong sisters and directed by Yoo Young-eun for Netflix. Produced by Imaginus alongside its subsidiaries, Trii Studio and Studio Sot, the series stars Kim Seon-ho, Go Youn-jung, Sota Fukushi, Choi Woo-sung, and Lee E-dam. It follows the relationship between Joo Ho-jin, a multilingual interpreter, and Cha Mu-hee, a top actress.

The Hong sisters originally developed the series for tvN in 2019, but the project was postponed due to the COVID-19 pandemic, which halted scheduled overseas filming in China. Development resumed in 2023, and Netflix announced it as an original series in June 2024. Produced entirely under a pre-production system, principal photography took place in South Korea, Japan, Canada, and Italy. The 12-episode series was released globally on Netflix on January 16, 2026.

Following its premiere, it debuted at number two on the Netflix Tudum global non-English Top Ten before rising to number one for two consecutive weeks, entering the top ten in 60 countries. It accumulated 271 million viewing hours and 20.6 million cumulative views over its first seven weeks. In Netflix's 2026 first half engagement report, it ranked 19th overall globally and second among Korean content, with 28.6 million views and 377.7 million hours viewed. Netflix Korea later named it one of its major intellectual properties for the platform's 10th anniversary and featured it in a special edition of Cine21 magazine as part of Netfix Korea Best 10 list. As part of the anniversary celebrations, a track from its original soundtrack was used in a special fireworks performance at the Seoul World Festival on September 5, 2026, and the series' artwork was included in collaboration merchandise with Musinsa and GS25.

The series received generally positive reviews, with praise for its central theme that every person has their own language, as well as for its direction, cinematography, and the chemistry and performances of the lead actors. Several critics complained about its pacing and mixed genre. The series received several nominations, including Best Director at the 62nd Baeksang Arts Awards, as well as multiple nominations at the KISF Global OTT Awards, the Blue Dragon Series Awards, and the Seoul International Drama Awards for its casts and original soundtracks. Commercially, several products featured in the show experienced a significant surge in sales, while its filming locations across South Korea, Japan, Canada, and Italy saw a notable increase in international set-jetting following the release.

== Premise ==
Joo Ho-jin is a highly skilled multilingual interpreter who lives by logic but struggles to understand people. He first encounters Cha Mu-hee in Tokyo, Japan, when she is still an unknown actress. Mu-hee rises to global stardom after her breakout role as zombie Do Ra-mi in a hit horror film The Quiet Woman. The two are reunited in Seoul during an international interview where Ho-jin becomes her interpreter.

His predictable life changes when he accepts a job as an interpreter for a global dating show titled Romantic Trip. Filmed on location in Canada and Italy, the program features Mu-hee and a Japanese actor named Hiro Kurosawa. As Ho-jin gradually falls for Mu-hee, he struggles to maintain professional composure. The two possess fundamentally opposite personalities and communication styles; Ho-jin is characteristically straight to the point, while Mu-hee tends to be roundabout. After a series of miscommunications, he realizes his biggest challenge is navigating Mu-hee's complicated emotions and the painful secrets she is hiding.

== Cast and characters ==
=== Main ===
Principal cast
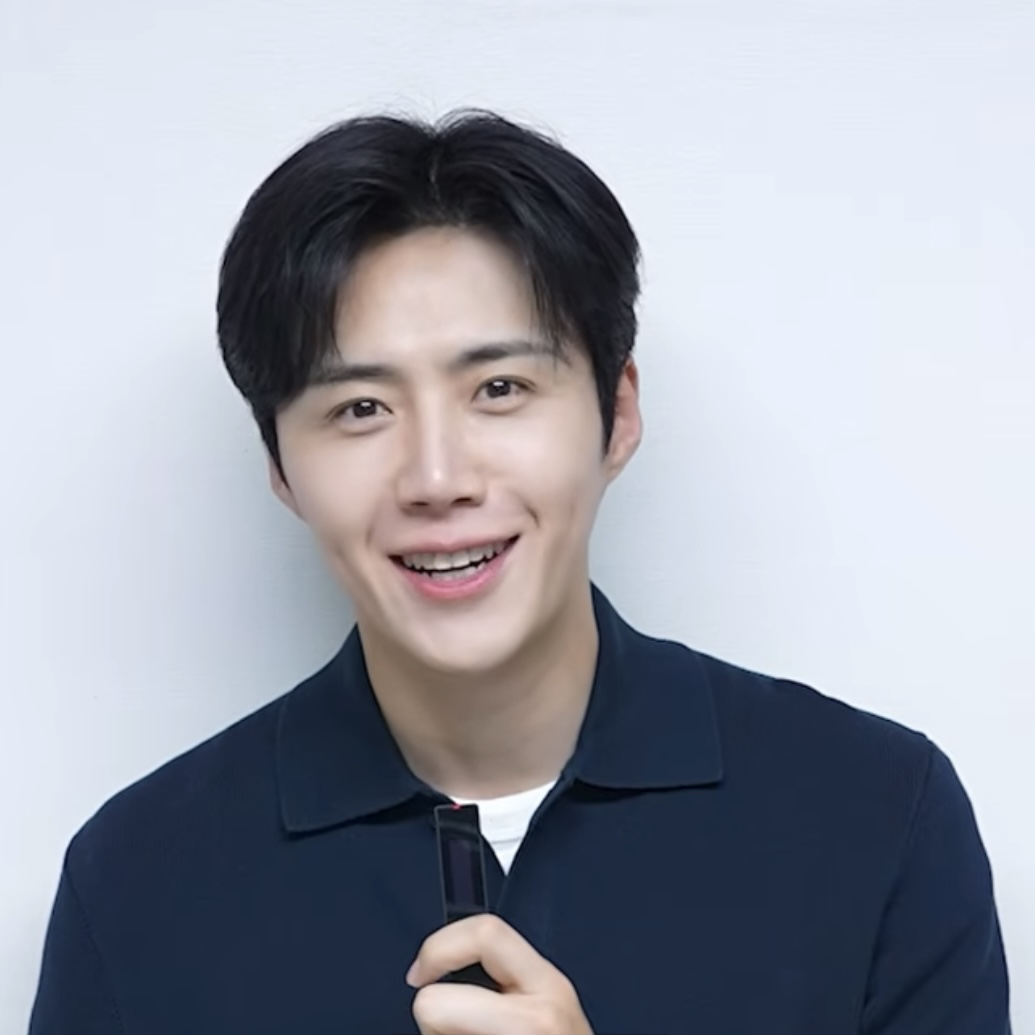
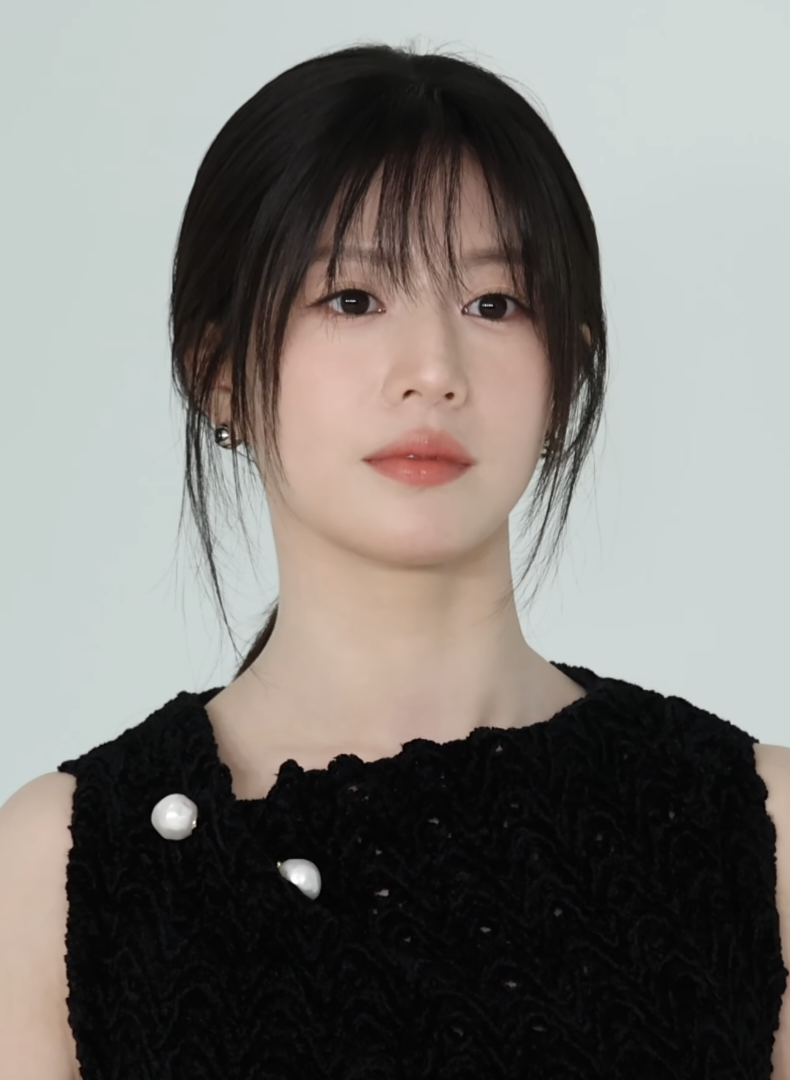
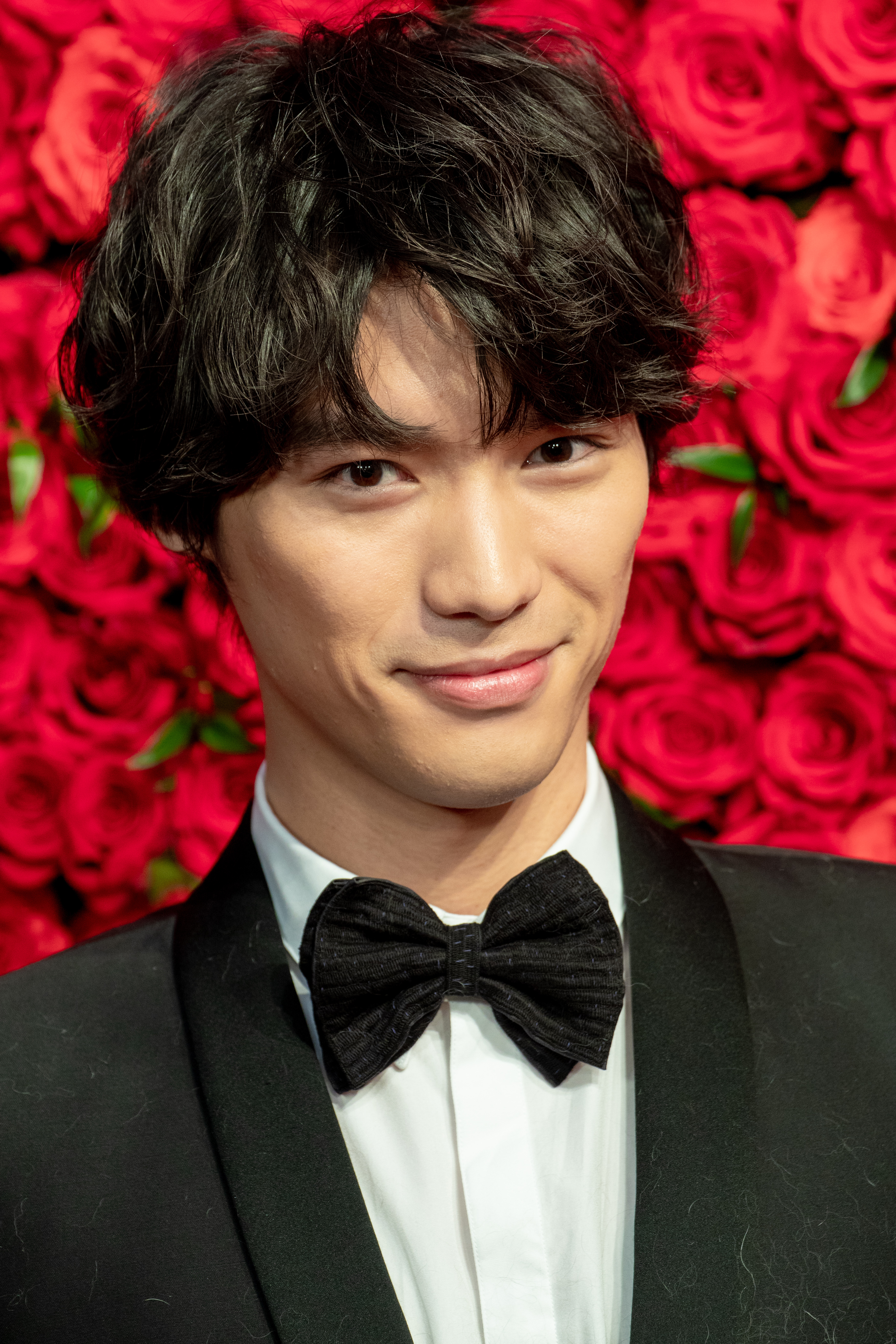
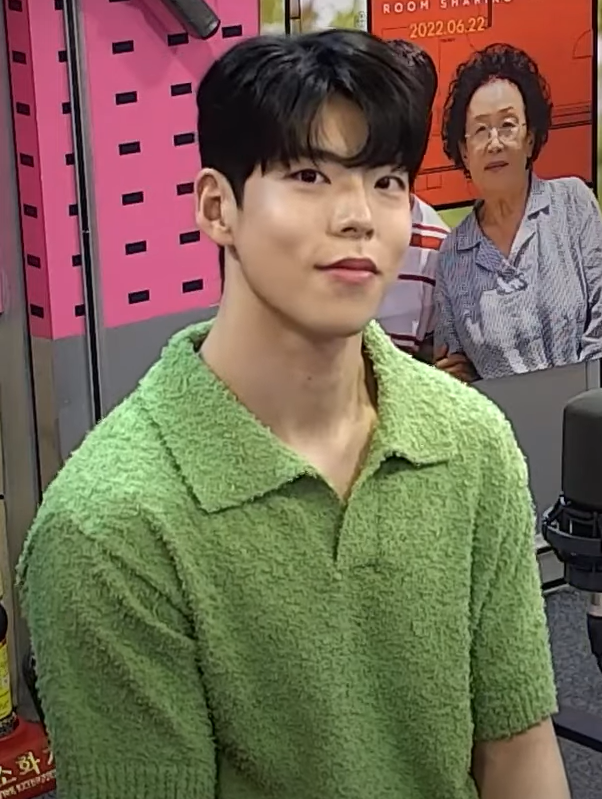
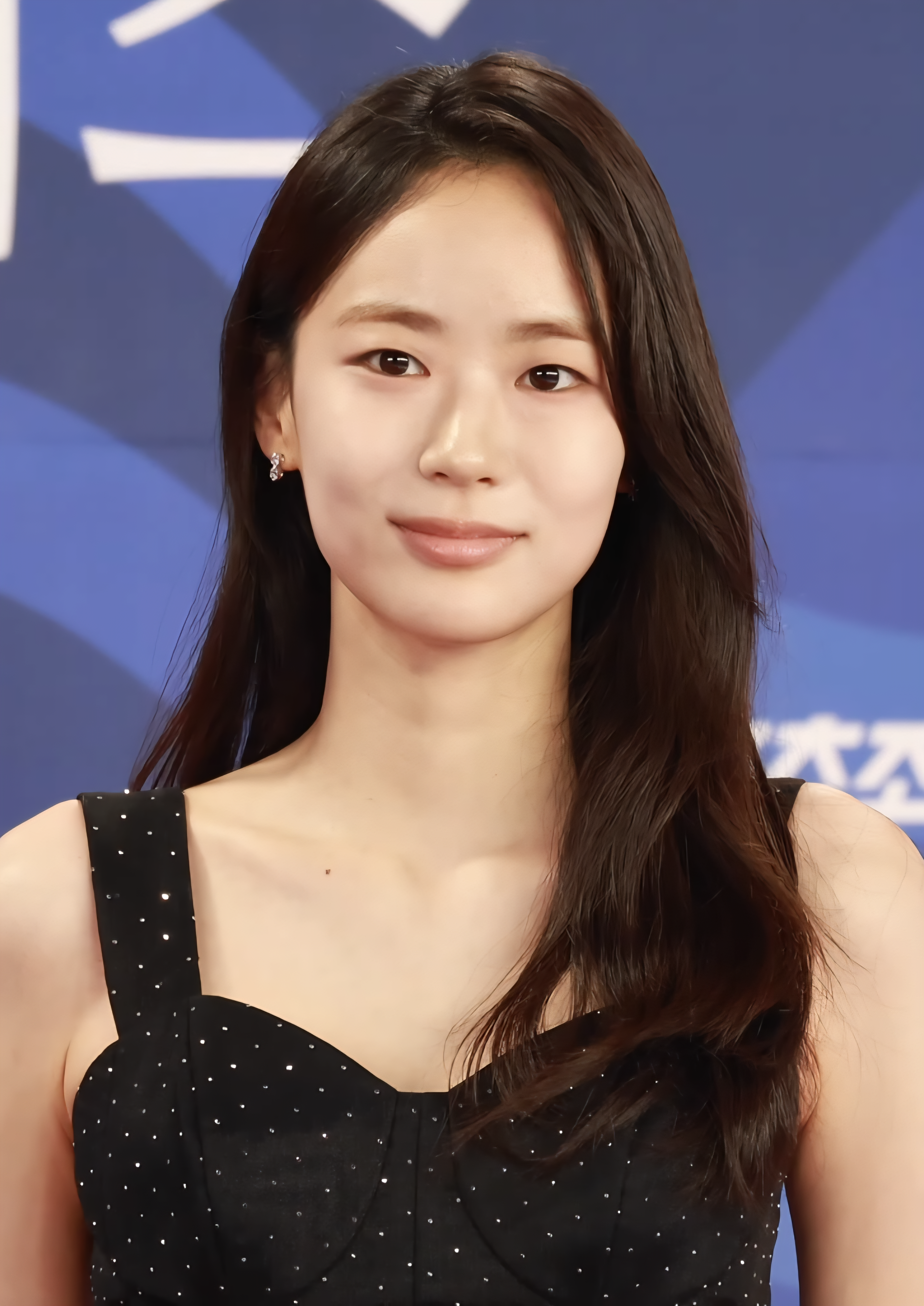
Principal cast (clockwise from top left): Kim Seon-ho, Go Youn-jung, Lee E-dam, Choi Woo-sung and Sota Fukushi
- Kim Seon-ho as Joo Ho-jin

A former novelist and a skilled multilingual interpreter who is fluent in Korean, Chinese, English, Japanese, French, and Italian, with some proficiency in Spanish and German. He values precision in both his professional and personal life.

- Go Youn-jung as Cha Mu-hee / Do Ra-mi

An aspiring actress who became a world-famous celebrity overnight after starring as zombie Do Ra-mi in the horror film Quiet Woman. Following her sudden fame, she earned the moniker "Horror Queen."
- Ahn Tae-rin as child Cha Mu-hee

- Sota Fukushi as Hiro Kurosawa

A famous Japanese actor widely known as the "Prince of Romance" who joins Mu-hee on the dating show Romantic Trip.

- Choi Woo-sung as Kim Yong-u

A former shooting athlete who serves as Cha Mu-hee's manager at Ahn Entertainment, having worked with her since her rookie days.

- Lee E-dam as Shin Ji-sun

A highly capable reality television director who helms Romantic Trip. At the beginning of the series, she is a longtime girlfriend of Na Jin-seok, Joo Ho-jin's older brother.

=== Supporting ===
- Baek Joo-hee as Cho Young-ah

The main writer of Romantic Trip.

- Kwak Min-gyu as Park In-su PD

The assistant director of Romantic Trip.

- Hyunri as Nanami

Hiro's manager, a Japanese woman who is fluent in Korean.

- Kim Won-hae as Kim Young-hwan

A renowned novelist and a close friend of Ho-jin's family.

- Shin Mun-seong as Cha Chairman

Mu-hee's paternal uncle, who later became her adoptive father.

- Woo Mi-hwa as Mrs Cha

The wife of Mu-hee's paternal uncle, who later became her adoptive mother.

- Choi Hee-jin as Yoon Mi-jung

Ho-jin's mother, who owns and operates a winery in Italy.

- Christian Burruano as Dario

Yoon Mi-jung's Italian fiancé.

- Seok-hee as Eiko

A Japanese woman working at Momo-chan Ramen, current partner of Mu-hee's ex boyfriend.

- Hana Kawamura as Momo-chan

A Japanese woman who owns Momo-chan Ramen.

- Yui Ichikawa as Hiro's older sister
- Cha Young-ju as assistant writer of Romantic Trip
- Park Jeong-yun as assistant writer of Romantic Trip
- Ha Jin-chul as youngest PD of Romantic Trip
- Seo Mun-ho as audio director of Romantic Trip
- Lee Si-hyung as a cameraman of Romantic Trip.
- Kim Do-young as Publisher Oh
- Jun Hyun-sook as Ho-jin's housekeeper
- Brian Larkin as US talk show host

=== Special appearances ===
- Sung Joon as Na Jin-seok

Ho-jin's paternal half-brother, a writer, and Ji-sun's longtime boyfriend, who later becomes her fiancé.

- Im Chul-soo as Kim Jeong-su PD

The original lead director of Romantic Trip, who steps down due to personal issue.

- Moon Se-yoon as a taxi driver

The taxi driver who picks up Ho-jin from the airport.

- Alberto Mondi as Andre

An Italian restaurant owner in Seoul and a close friend of Ho-jin.

- Lee Seung-kook as Ho-jin's Korean American friend
- Daniel Lindemann as Ho-jin's American friend
- Gong Te-yu as Ho-jin's Japanese friend
- Roh Jae-won as Kim Yu-jin

A Korean chef working at Momo-chan ramen. He is Mu-hee's ex-boyfriend and is currently in relationship with Eiko.

- Ahn Se-ho as Ahn CEO

Yong-u's maternal uncle and the CEO of Mu-hee's agency (Ahn Entertainment).

- Na Hyun-young as Mu-hee's make-up artist
- Jun Hyun-moo as himself.

The talk-show host.

- Kang Han-na as Yoo-jeong

The new tenant of apartment 610, formerly occupied by Yong-u.

- Lee Joon as Yoo-jeong's boyfriend
- Jeon Sung-woo as Do Ra-mi's boyfriend

== Episodes ==
No.	Directed by	Written by	Original release date
1	Yoo Young-eun	Hong Jung-eun and Hong Mi-ran	January 16, 2026
The prologue opens with Cha Mu-hee walking across a long bridge toward a castle. While waiting for her date, Japanese actor Hiro Kurosawa, she chats with her interpreter, Joo Ho-jin. Later, as Mu-hee and Hiro admire a stunning Italian landscape, Hiro suddenly confesses his love. Taken aback, Ho-jin translates the confession anyway, prompting Mu-hee to ask him how she should reply. Rewind to April 2024: Ho-jin wraps up a work trip in Tokyo and takes a detour to Shonan, where he bumps into Mu-hee at a train station. The two end up sitting side-by-side at Momo-chan ramen. When an Italian boy suffers a sudden allergic reaction, he steps in to help the panicked parents. Impressed by his language skills, Mu-hee begs him to interpret for her, and he helps her during a confrontation with her ex-boyfriend's new partner. To thank him, the child's mother gifts Ho-jin a reservation for two at a high-end restaurant, and he invites Mu-hee along. They kill time touring Kamakura together. He tells her that he once met his first love on Enoshima Island. While searching for the restaurant, they end up on opposite sides of the Enoden tracks. Ho-jin then receives a call informing him that his first love is in Japan, and Mu-hee urges him to go find her. Three months pass. Returning from a business trip, when he loads his suitcase into a taxi, the driver comments on an idol arriving nearby. This reminds Ho-jin of Mu-hee. Scrolling her Instagram while sitting on the back seat of the taxi, he stumbles upon his photo in Enoshima Island, secretly taken from afar. He follows her as promised, becoming her 10,000th follower and sends her a direct message, wishing her luck in her filming. At that exact instant, a stunt wire snaps, sending Mu-hee free-falling beneath a sky of exploding fireworks.
2	Yoo Young-eun	Hong Jung-eun and Hong Mi-ran	January 16, 2026
Do Ra-mi, Mu-hee's role in the horror film The Quiet Woman becomes a global viral sensation. Waking from a six-month coma, Mu-hee discovers she is suddenly a global celebrity. Her instagram followers increase to ten million. This leads to a candid photo of Ho-jin posted there attracting attention. Ho-jin suddenly appears before her as an interpreter for an interview with Vogue Singapore. Over dinner at Andre's Italian restaurant, he requests that she delete his photo. Mu-hee finds out that Ho-jin visits her several times when she was in a coma. She calls Ho-jin to tell him that she has already deleted his picture. Before she can thank him, Young-u tells her that he has found the identity of Ho-jin's first love, Shin Ji-sun, which Ho-jin overhears. Mu-hee visits his house to apologize for prying into his past. He admits that he visits Shonan on Ji-sun's birthday every year. After that, he suggests that they stop meeting each other. He promises to safeguard her secret and roots for her from afar.
3	Yoo Young-eun	Hong Jung-eun and Hong Mi-ran	January 16, 2026
Fast forward to August 2025. At the Tokyo International Film Festival, Japanese actor Hiro catches Mu-hee when she almost falls on the red carpet. In Seoul, the crew of Romantic Trip has cast Hiro as the male lead for their dating show, but they have not yet found a suitable female lead for him. One of the assistant directors suggests Mu-hee after seeing the red carpet footage. Meanwhile, Ho-jin happens to find Mu-hee crying in the hotel hallway. She tells him that she has been having vivid hallucinations of her zombie character Do Ra-mi. He takes her to a local psychiatrist, ending up translating some deeply personal details about her family during the appointment. Their path cross again when Mu-hee attends casting interview for Romantic Trip. Ho-jin takes the interpreter job for the show to avoid Ji-sun's upcoming wedding. Seeing Mu-hee's mental state makes Ho-jin question her stability for the show. An argument ensues, ending with Ho-jin agreeing to quit the show. He later regrets his harsh remarks, while Kim Young-hwan reminds him that everyone speaks their own unique language. Mu-hee soon asks to meet him at Andre's Italian restaurant to apologize. Realizing she cannot film without Ho-jin's support, she asks him to rejoin the show over a shared desire to see the aurora, and Ho-jin agrees.
4	Yoo Young-eun	Hong Jung-eun and Hong Mi-ran	January 16, 2026
In Japan, Hiro expresses his disappointment over Mu-hee being cast in the show. Kim PD asks Ho-jin to keep this a secret from Mu-hee. In their first filming in Canada, Hiro makes Mu-hee run around to find him. Ho-jin intentionally mistranslates Hiro's harsh remarks into jabs directed back at him. Hiro sabotages Mu-hee by a lie that her action made him lose his contact lenses. This causes a production halt and the crew blames Mu-hee. Mu-hee heads into town with Ho-jin to buy him Japanese food as a peace offering, only to spot Hiro walking around fine near the gastown steam clock. Mu-hee is angry at Ho-jin for hiding the fact that Hiro dislikes her. Per Nanami's advice, Ho-jin tries to smooth things over by giving Hiro an ice hockey ticket, which he obtains from a Canadian friend in exchange for Korean snacks he secretly takes from Yong-u's stash. Hiro relents and admits that he has found a spare pair of contact lenses. Ho-jin also helps mediate between Hiro and the crew. Filming eventually resumes. Ho-jin runs to find Mu-hee and, while driving her to the filming location, promises to be her ally for the rest of the shoot.
5	Yoo Young-eun	Hong Jung-eun and Hong Mi-ran	January 16, 2026
Filming halts again when Kim PD abruptly leaves the show. Hoping to run into Ho-jin, Mu-hee joins Yong-u for a drink. After Ho-jin returns, the two find themselves locked out of their rooms, so they spend the night together in the hotel lounge. The next morning starts light with a trip to a local farmers market, then breakfast in a diner, but the mood sours when Ji-sun arrives in Canada as Kim PD's replacement. This leads to another argument, leaving Mu-hee feeling rejected. A minor car accident makes Ho-jin miss the subsequent filming and Nanami has to replace him as an interpreter. Nanami and Hiro notice a change in Mu-hee's mood. After filming, Mu-hee waits anxiously for Ho-jin. When he finally arrives, the aurora borealis graces the sky. Witnessing the lights together, Mu-hee tells Ho-jin that whenever he sees aurora in the future, he will remember her, assuring him not to worry since aurora won't appear in Seoul. Meanwhile, Young-u finds out that Ji-sun has broke off her engagement.
6	Yoo Young-eun	Hong Jung-eun and Hong Mi-ran	January 16, 2026
Kim PD booked the national park filming permit for the wrong date, so the crew has to try and sort things out. They manage to get in after Mu-hee takes photos with the park rangers. Before filming, Ho-jin wants to show Mu-hee a waterfall he visited as a child, but they end up near a lake. After playing with the lake's water, Mu-hee impulsively kisses him. Anxious by Ho-jin's lack of reaction, Mu-hee suffers a restless night. Ra-mi keeps saying that she doesn't deserve love. The next day, Ho-jin appears and offers to drive her to the airport. In the car, he promises to resolve his feelings for Ji-sun before starting anew with Mu-hee. However, after learning that Ji-sun has cancelled her marriage, Mu-hee's insecurity rises. Mu-hee pushes Ho-jin away in a fit of defeat, leading to a heated argument at a road intersection in Calgary. Ho-jin walks away hurt, and Mu-hee misses her flight. When Yong-u snaps about barely rebooking another flight, she breaks down in his arms, regretting that she ruined things with Ho-jin.
7	Yoo Young-eun	Hong Jung-eun and Hong Mi-ran	January 16, 2026
Mu-hee is heartbroken, while Ho-jin and Jin-suk are also heartbroken but deal with it differently. While visiting Seoul, Nanami and Hiro learn from Yong-u that Mu-hee is attending a classical music concert hosted by the Italian Embassy. Ho-jin happens to attend the same concert with writer Kim Young-hwan and publisher Oh, while Jin-suk bails at the last minute to walk the Camino de Santiago. When Ho-jin interprets the opening of the concert, Mu-hee recognizes his voice. Young-hwan invites Mu-hee to a dinner at Ho-jin's place, claiming that the original guest canceled. In reality, he actually asked them not to come to give the two a chance to get closer. Once alone, Mu-hee brings up their relationship. After dinner, before leaving, Young-hwan encourages Ho-jin to learn Mu-hee's "language." When a song they heard in Canada starts playing by accident, Mu-hee impulsively decides to steal the vinyl, but Ho-jin catches her. Because he once bought it for her, he lets her have it, though Mu-hee accidentally leaves with just the sleeve. When Ho-jin drives over to drop off the vinyl, her aunt and uncle unexpectedly arrive, driving Mu-hee to ghost Ho-jin. Meanwhile, a new romance starts as Yong-u and Ji-sun share a series of charged encounters.
8	Yoo Young-eun	Hong Jung-eun and Hong Mi-ran	January 16, 2026
Mu-hee's alter ego, Do Ra-mi, crashes her relatives' family gathering to warn them to stay away. At night, Ho-jin finds Ra-mi inside his study. Assuming that Mu-hee is toying with him, he chases her away in anger and calls a taxi for her, only to suddenly passes out because she drugged his water. The next day at the TV station, Mu-hee apologizes to him, seemingly having no memory of the previous night's incident. When a stylist discovers a torn page of a poem in the dress Ra-mi wore, she was clueless as to why it's there. Ho-jin retrieves the page and agonizes over Mu-hee's abnormal behavior. During a lunch date, Hiro confronts Mu-hee about their kiss on the plane. The stress causes Ra-mi to resurface. Ho-jin calls Mu-hee, but Ra-mi answers instead. Ra-mi decides to go to Italy ahead of everyone else. Ho-jin follows, determined to uncover why she reappeared; when they meet up, he hands back the luxury items Ra-mi bought on a spending spree. Ra-mi also summons Hiro to Italy. Mu-hee finally regains consciousness to find herself and Hiro together in an Italian square while a stunned Ho-jin watches from afar.
9	Yoo Young-eun	Hong Jung-eun and Hong Mi-ran	January 16, 2026
Back in control, Mu-hee tries to understand what happened, directly asking Hiro if he has feelings for her. Hiro denies it. As Italian shoots begin, hearing Ho-jin's voice as interpreter brings her a wave of relief. Mu-hee knows that Ra-mi wanders at night, yet she is completely unaware that Ho-jin has been watching over her. To make Hiro indebted to Mu-hee, Ra-mi steals Hiro's film camera and recruits Ho-jin as her accomplice. Meanwhile, the crews catches a glimpse of Ho-jin and Ra-mi together. They suspect Ho-jin has an Italian girlfriend, but Nanami suspects the mistery girl is actually Mu-hee. The next day, the whole crew search for the camera in the opera theater. Ho-jin secretly puts it near Mu-hee so she can easily find it. Grateful, Hiro invites everyone to his teacher photography exhibition. At the exhibition, an image of the aurora borealis triggers Ra-mi's return. She seeks out Ho-jin and reveals Mu-hee's trauma: witnessing her mother kill her father as a child. Explaining that Mu-hee feels unworthy of happiness due to this dark past, Ra-mi confesses her love for Ho-jin and then says goodbye.
10	Yoo Young-eun	Hong Jung-eun and Hong Mi-ran	January 16, 2026
Jealous over rumors that Ho-jin has a girlfriend, Mu-hee confronts him and offers a half-hearted congratulations, leaving him frustrated. Soon after, the shoot moves to a winery owned by Mi-jung, Ho-jin's estranged mother. Recognizing Kim Young-hwan in a photo, Mu-hee figures out who Mi-jung is, giving Mi-jung an opportunity to invite her son for a dinner. Ho-jin asks Mu-hee to join her. A misunderstanding sparks a fistfight between Ho-jin and his mother's younger fiancé, Dario. Mi-jung steps in and hits Dario to stop it, which strangely clears the air and allows Ho-jin to finally make up with his mom. The whole crew later attends Mi-jung and Dario's wedding. While everyone is at the party, Mu-hee seeks Ho-jin to personally says goodbye to him. During the final shoot for Romantic Trip at a castle, Hiro confesses his love to Mu-hee. Ho-jin interprets the confession with a heavy hearts. Mu-hee asks him how she should respond, and in the end choose to answer in english "me too, thank you." The next day, Mu-hee attends the opera with Hiro. There, Nanami mentions that she had previously mistaken Ho-jin's friend for Mu-hee simply because they wore the same shoes. Park PD sends Mu-hee a behind-the-scenes footage that shows how completely heartbroken Ho-jin was once filming wrapped. Watching it triggers her memories as Ra-mi to come rushing back. When she finds Ho-jin, she admits her memory is back and tells him she still loves him. Ho-jin finally confesses that he has been able to see the aurora for a while, and seals their reunion with a kiss.
11	Yoo Young-eun	Hong Jung-eun and Hong Mi-ran	January 16, 2026
Ho-jin invites Mu-hee over to his place in Italy. The power cuts out, but Mu-hee decides to stay. They share another kiss and end up spending the night together. The next morning, Nanami urgently asks Ho-jin to interpret because Hiro completely passed out after drinking. Right after that, drama erupts online with rumors claiming Mu-hee is cheating with a married man. Netizens dig up her deleted Instagram post and mistake Ho-jin for her ex, Kim Yu-jin. To shut down the rumors and clear her name, Mu-hee quickly posts a new photo featuring herself, Yu-jin, and Eiko. Later on, Yu-jin vents about how exhausting it is to be linked to a top celebrity. Concerned, Mu-hee puts on an act, pretending to be Ra-mi, and tells Ho-jin they should break up. Ho-jin sees right through the act and refuses. The CEO of Ahn Entertainment asks Yong-u about the identity of the man in Mu-hee Instagram post. After Young-u explains everything to him, the CEO tells him that she needs to date secretly for the time being. He also tells Yong-u that he has managed to secure him his dream job as a sports agent in the UK, but he has to leave within 3 months. Yong-u finds himself torn between love and his career. When Mu-hee meets Hiro to review Romantic Trip post editing episodes, Hiro clarifies that his feeling is real. During a train ride to Busan, Ji-sun runs into Ho-jin by chance and asks why he was in Enoshima on her birthday.
12	Yoo Young-eun	Hong Jung-eun and Hong Mi-ran	January 16, 2026
Mu-hee apologizes to Hiro for leading him on. Meanwhile, Ho-jin opens up to Ji-sun about his unrequited love for her, and they finally go their separate ways in Busan. When Ho-jin returns to Seoul, he finds Mu-hee waiting for him at the station. She takes him to her favorite spot in the city, where Ho-jin suggests they visit a dark-sky reserve in the future so they can stargaze together. Yong-u travels to Busan to propose to Ji-sun. She decides there is no need to rush into marriage but plans to pursue graduate study in the UK in order to be with him. Kim Young-hwan and Publisher Oh visit Mu-hee's uncle to ask about her background. This meeting prompts her uncle to see Ho-jin to explain the truth about Mu-hee's past. Around the same time, her aunt meets Mu-hee and points out how much she resembles her mother. The shock causes Mu-hee to collapse. She remains unconscious for three days, keeping Ho-jin, Yong-u, and Hi-ro on edge as they wait for her to wake up. Once she is discharged from the hospital, Ho-jin gently breaks the truth to her: her parents actually survived the childhood tragedy. Mu-hee finally realizes that "Do Ra-mi" is a manifestation of her buried memories of her mother. Needing closure, Mu-hee decides to go find her mother to get answers, putting her relationship with Ho-jin on a temporary pause. On Christmas, Mu-hee travels to the dark-sky reserve to find Ho-jin. Using Papago to voice her feelings in foreign languages, she tells him how much she missed him before they share a kiss under the stars.

== Production ==
=== Development ===
In 2019, the Hong Sisters began developing the project alongside director Park Jun-hwa. By December 5 of that year, the series was in development for tvN under the working title I saram tongyeogi doenayo? (이 사람 통역이 되나요?; 'Can this person interpret?'). The project was later renamed Guwonui tongyeok (구원의 통역; 'Interpretation of salvation'), with overseas filming scheduled in China, however it was canceled due to the COVID-19. The Hong Sisters and Park subsequently pivoted to collaborate on a different tvN drama, Alchemy of Souls.

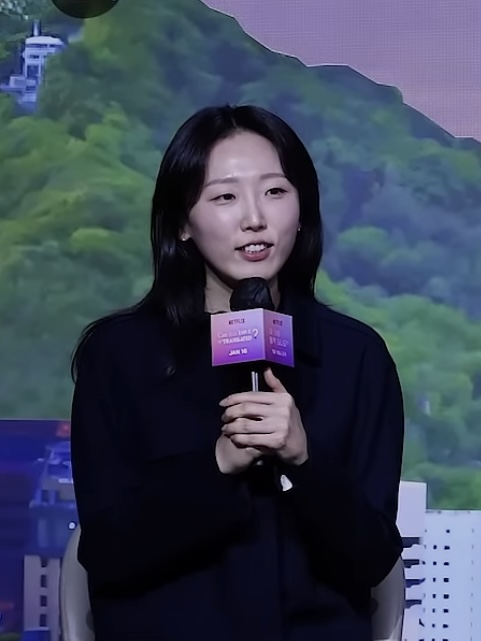
Director Yoo Young-eun

The production resumed in 2023 under Trii Studio, a label under Imaginus, which also serves as the parent company of the Hong sisters' own label, Studio Sot, with new director Yoo Young-eun. The creative team included Keeha Choi as director of photography, who previously worked with director Yoo on Bloody Hearts. Production designer Seo Seong-gyeong, costume designer Jo Sang-gyeong, and makeup director Song Jong-hee also joined the project. Visual effects were handled by Studio Hi, a subsidiary of Hive Media Corporation. Original score were handled by Studio MaumC, with Ma Joo-hee acted as music producer, and Choi In-hee served as music director.

The final title—I Sarang Tongyeok Doenayo? (이 사랑 통역 되나요?; 'Can this love be translated?'), abbreviated as Isatong (이사통)—was chosen to directly merge the protagonist's profession with the central theme. By April 2024, reports indicated that the series would be released on Netflix. Netflix officially confirmed production on June 27, 2024, as a project planned for a 2025 release and revealed the official English title as Can This Love Be Translated? All production preparations were finalized that same month.

=== Concept ===
The narrative was inspired by the unique nature of the interpreting profession. The writers observed how heavily people rely on mobile translation apps to solve language barriers. They believed that relying on a human would intensify that dependence dramatically, because complete trust in the interpreter is necessary. They imagine that the dynamic could ignite a powerful romantic connection. Central to their vision is the idea that love is fundamentally an act of communication. Yet because every person speaks their own "love language," a person may want to convey their true feelings, but the other person often cannot fully comprehend them. This vision led them to write the story around the following premise: What if a highly skilled interpreter encounters someone who expresses love in the complete opposite manner? The clash between their opposing love languages produces frequent misunderstandings. Confessions are misread and interpreted backward, resulting in repeated heartache.

Yoo noted that the writers sought out her specific directorial style, as seen in her previous works, to bring a unique color to the project's storytelling. Yoo explained that their initial goal was to craft a romantic comedy about two people with clashing personalities who overcome their misunderstandings through language. This theme shaped everything from the title and situations to the characters' professions. However, as the story progressed, it evolved beyond a simple narrative about words, ultimately focusing on the deeper journey of truly understanding another person.

=== Casting ===
The casting process underwent several iterations, beginning in April 2023 when Son Suk-ku was reportedly offered the lead role, but ultimately declined in favor of Nine Puzzles. In July 2023, discussions began with Kim Seon-ho and Han So-hee, and Go Youn-jung entered talks by September 2023. The final lineup was officially made public on June 27, 2024, when Netflix confirmed the casting of Kim, Go, Choi Woo-sung, Sota Fukushi and Lee E-dam, alongside photos from the script reading. Later in September, Keep Alberta Rolling held auditions for extras to appear in the series.

Director Yoo explained that Kim and Go secured their roles because their respective performance styles matched the complex character traits developed alongside the screenwriters. Kim was chosen for his ability to balance Ho-jin's serious, restrained nature with the Hong sisters' signature comedic style, as well as his ability to convey the subtle emotional shifts required for a slow-burn romance, while Go was cast for her natural, bubbly charm and transparency, alongside the writers' established trust from earlier projects.

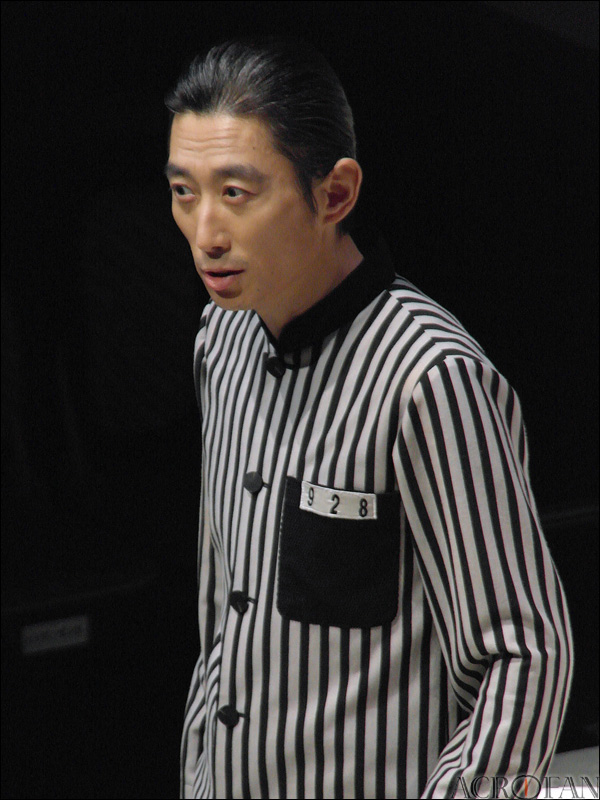
Kim Won-hae

Choi was recommended by the Hong sisters, who liked his performance in My Girlfriend Is a Gumiho, beginning auditions first among the cast and securing the role of Kim Yong-u after a ten-month process involving three meetings with Yoo and chemistry reads with both Go and Lee. Yoo decided to cast Fukushi as Hiro because he fit the character well and showed real respect for Korean productions. He also had a strong interest in Korea and had been studying the language beforehand. Yoo also explained that she looked into past rumors about his supposed right-wing views, and confirming that the actor has no particular political leanings.

Regarding the supporting cast, Yoo noted that Kim Won-hae brought vitality to the production while helping convey Ho-jin's unspoken emotions. He previously worked with Yoo in other drama. Italian television personality Alberto Mondi made a cameo appearance to serve as a cultural bridge between South Korea and Italy.

=== Filming ===
Principal photography started in June 2024 with a target completion of early 2025. Overseas shoots began immediately, with lead actors Go Youn-jung and Kim Seon-ho filming in Japan from June 24 through July 10. They filmed at several locations, including Gokurakuji Station, Goryo Shrine, and Kamakura Seaside Park in Kamakura; and Grand Torii of Enoshima Shrine, Tenzan Lab, Enoshima Benzaiten Nakamize Street, Katase Fishing Port, and Enoshima Sea Candle on Enoshima.

The series began pre-production in Alberta, Canada, from August 12 to September 22, 2024, followed by filming from September 23 to October 11. Operating under the name Sailor Films Inc. with a crew of 150, the production filmed across multiple distinct regions of the province. In the Calgary area, locations included Stephen Avenue, Lougheed House, Galaxie Diner, The Next Page Book and Coffee, Crossroads Market, Mount Pleasant Viewpoint, and Calgary Heritage Park.

Production then moved to the Canadian Rockies, where scenes were shot in Canmore and at nearby Quarry Lake on October 7. Filming continued in Banff National Park on October 8 and 9, covering the town Banff, Cascade of Time Garden, Banff pedestrian bridge, and Lake Louise. Additional filming occurred in Horseshoe Canyon, located in the Alberta Badlands. A pivotal aurora borealis scene between the leads in the drama was filmed in Upper Kananaskis Lake. While returning from this location, the leads shared social media updates documenting the aurora borealis visible during their commute to accommodations.

In late November 2024, production moved to Italy, with Kim Seon-ho departing for Rome on November 23. Initial scenes were captured at the Baths of Caracalla in Rome, before shifting to the hilltop village of Civita di Bagnoregio in the Lazio region. Working in collaboration with the Tuscany Film Commission, the crew spent a week across Tuscany through December 4, utilizing Montalcino's stone streets and scenic viewpoints overlooking the Val d'Orcia Historic landmarks in Siena provided a rich backdrop including the iconic Piazza del Campo, Teatro dei Rozzi, Torre del Mangia, Loggia dei Nove, and Contrada della Torre.

Shooting then transitioned into the Umbria region for several days in early December. Perugia's historic center served as a primary focus during this stretch, with cameras rolling across prominent sites like the Palazzo dei Priori and the Fontana Maggiore in Piazza IV Novembre, Piazza Danti, Piazza Matteotti, the Loggiato della Prefettura in Piazza Italia, alongside a network of atmospheric alleyways including Via Fani, Via della Gabbia, Via Maestà delle Volte, Via delle Cantine, Via Alessi, Via Cesare Battisi. The Italian leg officially concluded on December 10, 2024, with final scenes at the Giunti Odeon bookshop-cinema back in Florence, Tuscany.

Filming also spanned multiple regions across South Korea, including various Seoul landmarks such as Cafe Sunday Arvo, Youngpoong Bookstore Jongno Branch, N Seoul Tower, Gamgodang-gil, the Peninsula Lounge at the Lotte Hotel, Raum Art Center, Movieland in Seongsu-dong, Vietnamese restaurant Pho ông Nam 24 Dangsan Branch, and Sinheung Market in Haebangchon. Filming also took place at Concino Concrete and Sanmeoru Farm in Paju and Hwiwoo Cafe in Goyang within Gyeonggi Province. Additional sites includes Gujeong Art Center, Asan, Castle Assisi in Yangpyeong, Pinodia Expo Tower in Sokcho, Buyeo National Museum, Woraksan Youth Hostel in Jecheon, and Gyeongnam National University campus. Filming officially concluded on February 5, 2025.

== Promotion and release ==
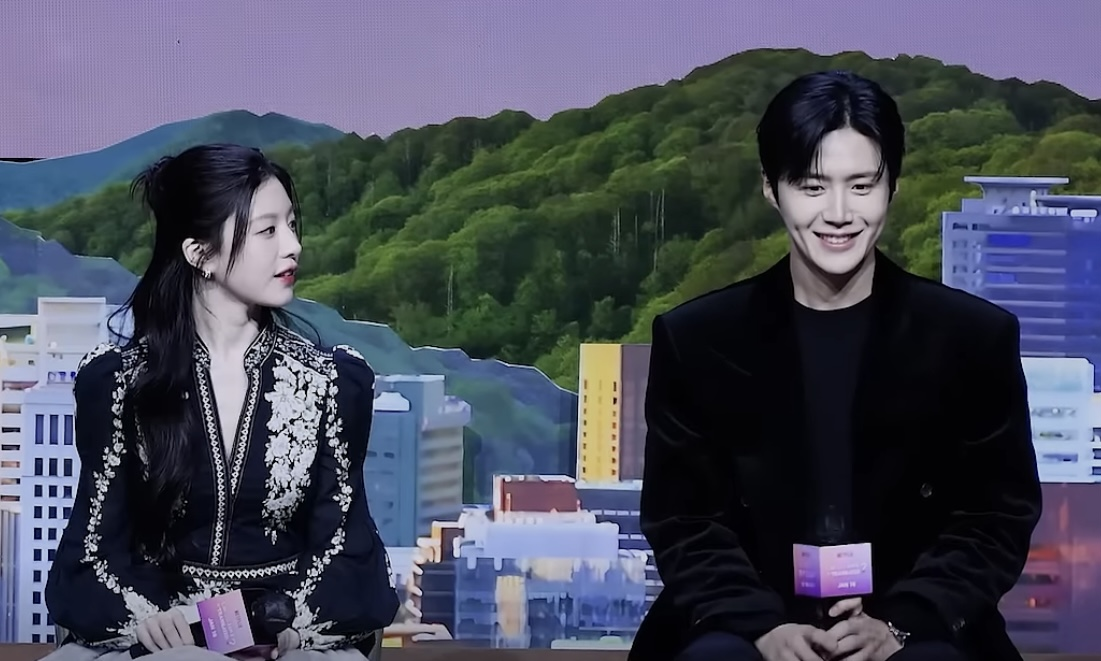
Go Youn-jung (left) and Kim Seon-ho (right) attended the series press conference on January 13, 2026

The series was officially announced by Netflix as part of its 2025 lineup on February 4, 2025, during the "Next on Netflix 2025 Korea" event, with Director Yoo Young-eun participating as a panelist. Although it was initially slated for a 2025 release, the premiere was later rescheduled for January 16, 2026. This new date was officially announced on December 18, 2025, alongside the release of the teaser trailer and poster. The main trailer was subsequently released on January 5, 2026.

Before the premiere, Netflix Korea held a press conference for the series at the Josun Palace in Gangnam-gu, Seoul. The press conference was hosted by Park Kyung-lim. Director Yoo and the lead actors were present. Netflix Korea also organized an "experience zone" at Times Square, featuring themed decorations representing the primary filming locations: Korea, Japan, Canada, and Italy. Kim and Go subsequently participated in a fan event titled "Romantic Trip" at the same venue. The event was broadcast live through Netflix Korea's official YouTube Channel.

On the day of the premiere, Netflix Korea and Netflix Indonesia co-hosted a fan event and an experience zone at the Kota Kasablanka Atrium in Jakarta. The promotion saw significant public interest, drawing approximately 30,000 applicants for only 2,000 available seats. Yoo, Kim, and Go traveled to Jakarta for the event, which included an afternoon meet and greet at the experience zone and an evening fan meeting. The event was broadcast live via the Netflix Indonesia YouTube channel.

== Original soundtrack ==
Can This Love Be Translated?

Soundtrack album by Various artists
- Released: January 16, 2026
- Genre: Pop
- Languages: Korean; English
- Labels: Studio MaumC; Netflix Music, LLC
- Producer: Ma Joo-hee

The soundtrack was released on January 16, 2026, by Studio MaumC and Netflix Music, LLC. Studio MaumC's CEO Ma Joo-hee acted as producer and Choi In-hee served as music director. As of February 2, three songs from the soundtrack appeared on the Melon OST chart: "Language of Love" by Kim Min-seok, "Daydream" by Wendy, and "Promise" by Wonstein. "Language of Love" reached number one on the Instagram Reels Trending Music chart on January 23 and the Korean YouTube Trending Music chart on January 26.

OST

Released on January 16, 2026
No.	Title	Lyrics	Music	Artist	Length
1.	"Love Language"	Lee Joon-hyung	Lee; Naiv	Kim Min-seok (MeloMance)	3:06
2.	"Dance Alone"	Zior Park	Park; Rockitman; Kim Han-bin; Mango	Zior Park	3:06
3.	"Promise"	Dailog; 16	Dailog; Naiv	Wonstein	3:08
4.	"Delight"	Hemian; Yoo Jang-hyung	Yoo	Viola	3:28
5.	"Round and Round"	Kang Geu-neul	Park Jun-ha	Jisokury	4:05
6.	"Good bye"	9z	9z	We Are The Night	3:54
7.	"Waltz for Moon"	Naiv	Oh Dong-joon	Hodge	4:00
8.	"Someday"	Mao; Noah (GCA)	Ji-hae (GCA)	Siyeon (Dreamcatcher)	3:24
9.	"Bittersweet"	Zeenan; Croq; Jade; Spacecowboy	Zeenan; Croq; Jade; Spacecowboy	Siso	3:12
10.	"Lay Down Together"	Aseul; Nien	Nien	Off the Menu	4:08
11.	"Daydream"	16; Do.ne	16; Do.ne	Wendy	4:35
12.	"Your Words, My Heart"	Choi In-hee; Oh Hye-ju	Choi In-hee; Oh Hye-ju	Hodge; Oh Hye-ju	3:23
Total length:					43:29

Original score

Released on January 16, 2026
No.	Title	Music	Length
13.	"Easy to Love"	Oh Hye-ju	2:30
14.	"Sugar Rush"	Choi In-hee; Lim Hyun-ji	1:50
15.	"Little Parade"	Oh Hye-ju	2:36
16.	"La Romantica Do Ra-mi"	Choi In-hee; Lim Hyun-ji	2:33
17.	"Do Ra-mi in Three"	Choi In-hee; Oh Hye-ju	3:15
18.	"Zombie Ballet"	Choi In-hee; Lim Hyun-ji	2:16
19.	"Do Ra-mi's Choir"	Isori	2:18
20.	"Fade Into Her"	Lim Hyun-ji	2:17
21.	"Sweet Mischief"	Choi In-hee; Oh Hye-ju	2:34
22.	"Dap Dap"	Kim Hyun-joo	2:47
23.	"Oops, She's Here"	Oh Hye-ju	2:47
24.	"Cheeky"	Lim Hyun-ji	1:53
25.	"Who Are You"	Choi In-hee; Lee So-ri	2:12
26.	"Lost Things"	Lim Hyun-ji	3:33
27.	"I'm Okay"	Isori	2:45
28.	"Romantic Fantasy"	Kim Hyun-joo	4:36
29.	"Dollhouse"	Lim Hyun-ji	3:50
30.	"Quiet Room"	Choi In-hee; Oh Hye-ju	3:22
31.	"Last Carnival"	Choi In-hee; Lim Hyun-ji	2:57
Total length:			96:20

== Critical response ==
Professional ratings
Aggregate scores
Source	Rating
Rotten Tomatoes	83%
Review scores
Source	Rating
Best of Korea	8.4/10
Common Sense Media	4/5 stars
India Today	3.5/5 stars
Mashable India	4/5 stars
Screen Rant	9.5/10
South China Morning Post	3/5 stars

Pierce Conran of the South China Morning Post gave the series a generally positive review, though he criticized its attempt to juggle too many genres, noting that it happens at the expense of the core plot. Melissa Camacho of Common Sense Media described the show as imperfect but entertaining. Joel Keller of Decider recommended it, Aashna Nadkarni of Mashable India also lauded the show's score. Shealyn Scott, a senior writer at Screen Rant, highlighted the series' compelling storyline and noted that its distinct visual identity, which encompasses cinematography, set design, costuming, and editing, creates a comprehensive feast for the eyes.

Cultural columnist Yang Seong-hee highlighted the fairytale-like atmosphere, captivating visuals, and emotional pacing, stating that the "judicious placement of heart-fluttering moments" showcases the strengths of Korean romance dramas. Kang So-jeong, an editor at Art Insight, attributed the series' success to its relatable themes, noting its resonance with viewers who identified with the protagonists. Lee Eun-ju of the Seoul Shinmun praised director Yoo Young-eun for delicately using urban landscapes to highlight the characters' emotional development.

Writing for The Hankyoreh, Hwang Jin-mi noted that the series modernizes the genre by blending a global sensibility with the meta-dramatic format of dating reality shows. Hwang wrote that the series explores psychological depths by treating the protagonist's dissociative identity disorder with literary symbolism, and provides a critique of modern relationship anxieties by showcasing a "utopia of gentle masculinity" that positions empathetic and responsible male characters as alternatives to real-world gender toxicity. However, Hwang also noted weaknesses in the loose narrative and genre hybridization.

Reviewers shared similar praise for Kim and Go's chemistry: Keller of Decider called it "undeniable," Suwitcha of Bangkok Post called it "fantastic," Almeida of O Tempo referred to it as "magnetic," and Agarwal from Hello Magazine called it "easy breezy romantic chemistry." Nadkarni of Mashable India said that "it was so beautiful that you unknowingly fall in love with everything the show has to offer." Park Jin-young of Joy News24 commented that the on-screen chemistry between Kim and Go served as the show's main saving grace despite its narrative flaws.

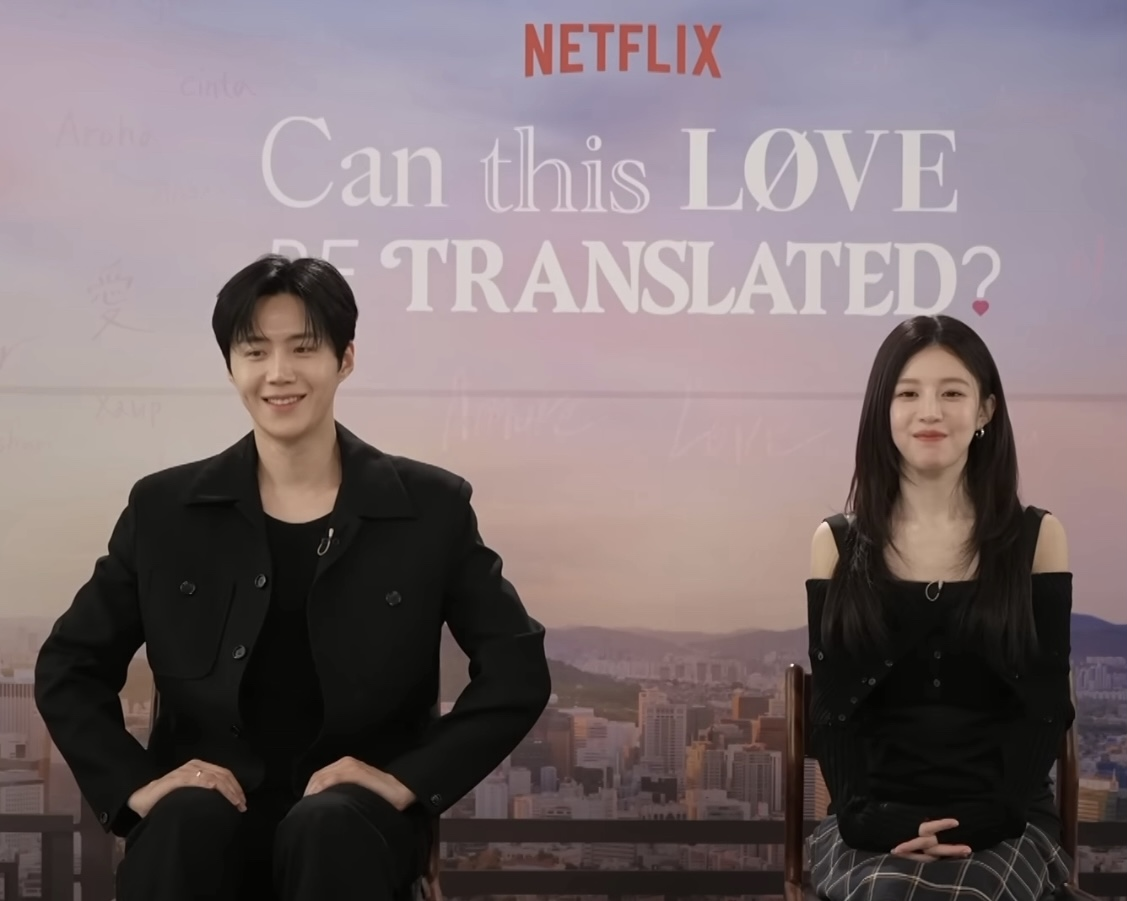
Kim Seon-ho (left) and Go Youn-jung (right) attending online interview

The individual performances of the lead actors were widely praised. In an article for Korea Medical, Lee Bo-hyun analyzes the technical qualities of Kim's voice as Joo Ho-jin, attributing its appeal to his clear pronunciation, rich resonance, and precise tone control. Lee notes that Kim's steady, low register conveys emotional shifts, blending a masculine presence with a softer quality that complements his acting. Jo Su-jin of Joynews24 focused on Joo Ho-jin's styling, noting that his wardrobe evolved to reflect his shifting emotional states. Jo observed that his costuming functioned as a visual language reflecting his profession, personality, and changing relationship dynamics.

Gong Na-ri, an editor for Munhwa Journal Mac, praised the actors for overcoming the narrative's forced elements. Gong wrote that Go Yoon-jung poignantly portrayed a collapsing ego, shifting between the anxious top star Mu-hee and the uncontrollable Do Ra-mi, using an empty gaze following her character's memory loss to express a deep psychological abyss. Meanwhile, Gong credited Kim with softening the potential stiffness of his character. Gong praised Kim's balanced performance, noting that his gentle and playful approach allowed Ho-jin to serve as both "a patient observer" of Mu-hee's delusions and a "warm healer".

== Viewership and industry performance ==
According to FlixPatrol, the series debuted at number five globally in the Netflix series category on January 17, 2026. By the following day, the drama rose to third place globally and topped the viewership charts in several countries, including South Korea, Indonesia, Malaysia, the Philippines, Singapore, Taiwan, Thailand, and Vietnam.

Can This Love Be Translated? Netflix Weekly Global Rank
Week	Date	Global Rank (Note: non-English series)	Hours viewed	Views	1st Rank (Note: in number of countries)	Top 10	Ref.
1	January 12–18, 2026	2	53,200,000	4,000,000	4	36	
2	January 19–25, 2026	1	118,000,000	9,000,000	15	60	
3	January 26 – February 1, 2026	1	56,600,000	4,300,000	3	43	
4	February 2–8, 2026	3	31,600,000	2.400,000	2	27	
5	February 9–15, 2026	—N/a				17	
6	February 16–22, 2026	—N/a				10	
7	February 23 – March 1, 2026	9	11,600,00	900,000	—N/a	7	
Runtime		13:11 hours					
Cumulative viewing time		271,000,000 hours					
Cumulative views		20,600,000 views					

On July 17, 2026, Netflix released its engagement report for the first half of the year, highlighting Can This Love Be Translated? among successful Korean series. The show ranked 19th overall globally and second among K-content, drawing 28.6 million views and totaling 377,700,000 hours viewed.

== Impact ==
=== Industry metrics ===
The series contributed to its production company profitability. According to the Financial Supervisory Service's electronic disclosure system on April 6, 2026, from its three series, Imaginus recorded sales of approximately 149.1 billion won on a consolidated basis in 2025. Although the series was released in January, its delivery to Netflix was completed last year, so it was reflected in the results for that period.

Following its release on January 16, 2026, big data analytics firm Good Data Corporation reported that Can This Love Be Translated? and its leads simultaneously dominated the TV-OTT buzz rankings. For three consecutive weeks (the third, fourth, and fifth weeks of January), the series ranked first in the integrated TV-OTT drama category. During this same period, leads Go Youn-jung and Kim Seon-ho held the first and second positions, respectively, in the cast buzzworthiness category. Go and Kim also took first and second rank respectively in Sometrend Analysis Center's January 2026 performer buzz-worthiness ranking. In October, Good Data released Top Ranking Korean drama on Netflix in term of buzz, and the series rank 2nd for original series and 6th overall with buzz score 5452.

Data consulting firm PMI conducted a survey through its Haypole research platform, targeting 5,000 men and women aged 20–50. The survey had a margin of error of ±1.39 percentage points at a 95% confidence level. On February 2, 2026, chosen by 19% of respondents, the series topped the list of the Most Popular OTT and TV Shows to Watch This Week, while on the subsequent week, the series ranked second, with 15.8% of respondents selecting it.

=== Cultural and social influence ===
The series also drove significant cultural engagement, as viral clips of the character Joo Ho-jin sparked what media outlets termed a "Joo Ho-jin fever". This popularity extended directly into fashion trends, with consumer interest spiking for Ho-jin's messenger bag and overall wardrobe. Cha Mu-hee's "L'HAS Classic Suede Bomber Jacket" sparked a surge of inquiries and soon sold out. Styled with a one-piece dress, the look was both feminine and polished through layering. The outfit became a trend, and the jacket was dubbed a sonminsutem (손민수템). (Note: Sonminsutem (손민수템) is a Korean slang term, a combination of Son Min-su and item. The character Son Min-su originally appeared in the drama the Cheese in the Trap. The character known for obsessively mimics others. Originally pejorative, the term is now used colloquially in fandom to describe purchasing trending products used by idols.)

The drama influenced literary appreciation. Women Sense reported the rise of "poet core", highlighting the media's role in recommending poetry through a case study of Kim Kyung-mi's poetry collection, The Order of the Shooting Pain. Featuring a poem from the series, the book became available for pre-order and entered the bestseller list. On June 1, 2026, a dialogue from the series was featured in 2026 10th Grade Literature Exam in Hanoi, Vietnam. The exam question quoted an exchange where Ho-jin states that there are over 7,100 languages in the world, to which his teacher responds, "There are as many languages as there are people in the world, because everyone speaks their own language." Based on this excerpt, candidates were required to write an essay exploring an individual's capacity to listen to the voices around them. Ho-jin's appearance in the exam quickly gained online attention, with young viewers expressing excitement that a popular drama had become part of a major test, while teachers praised the material as fresh and relatable for encouraging student reflection on communication and empathy.

Public influence crossed into political spheres as well. On January 29, 2026, President Lee Jae-myung's YouTube channel adopted the show's aesthetic for a video regarding the 21st Senior Secretary to the President meeting. The thumbnail mirrored the Netflix series, replacing its logo with "Jamflix" and adapting the title into the pun, "Can you feel this policy?" This highlighted the Blue House's shift toward a meme-friendly style to engage netizens.

The series' is one of Netflix Korea major IPs featured in 10th anniversary of Netflix Korea programming. Netflix Korea collaborated with Hanwha for the Seoul World Fireworks Festival, held on September 5, 2026, at Yeouido Hangang Park. During the main performance by the South Korean team, Hanwha delivered a thirty-minute finale featuring fireworks synchronized to songs, including series' original soundtrack "Daydream" by Wendy. Special merchandises are planned to be released. Netflix Korea collaborated with GS 21 to release transportation cards featuring the series. They also collaborates with Musinsa to release special design t-shirt.

In October 2026, as part of the 2026 Korea Drama Festival in Jinju city, artist Yoon Ji-seong helds a painting exhibition with works inspired by four Korean dramas, including Can This Love Be Translated?, running until October 18. One of them is titled "Maze of the Heart, Interpretation of Sincerity," featured seven four leaf clovers.

=== International outreach and tourism ===
The surge in interest in the series restulted in heighten interest in its filming location. After appearing in the series, the Gujeong Art Center reportedly has a rising number of international visitors. Visit Korea published a recommended date course for domestic filming location of the series that featured International Dark Sky Park in Yeongyang, Gyeongbuk, National Buyeo Museum in Buyeo, Chungnam, and Sanmeoru Farm in Paju. It also prompted South Korean travel agencies to introduce specialized "set-jetting" tour packages to Japan, Italy, and Canada.

==== Japan ====
In March 2026, a report by Trip.com titled "2026 Cherry Blossom Season Travel Trends" found that 70% of surveyed Hong Kong travelers identified Korean drama filming locations as a primary factor in their itinerary planning. According to the report, the series Can This Love Be Translated? drove a month-over-month interest increase of more than 60% for Kamakura and Enoshima, Japan. Specific metrics included a 66% rise in train bookings to Kamakura and a 55% increase in related hotel searches and bookings. Reservations for local tours, such as shrine pilgrimages and sea-view tram rides, grew by 64% during the same period.

The surge in visitors from South Korea and Southeast Asia has led to concerns regarding overtourism in Kamakura. The Asahi Shimbun reported resident complaints regarding overcrowding and unauthorized photography near a railway crossing featured in the drama. In response, local authorities installed multilingual signage in English, Korean, and Japanese in late March to request that visitors respect private property. Officials also notified the production company to request greater consideration during future filming projects.

==== Italy ====
On April 14, 2026, the Istituto Culturale Coreano announced that director Yoo Young-eun and producer Lee Hyun-young would conduct a series of drama workshops and lectures in Rome. On April 16, they led a professional workshop at the Centro Sperimentale di Cinematografia, where they examined the creative process and the specific challenges of filming in Italy. Later that afternoon, they delivered a lecture to approximately 200 students at Sapienza University of Rome on the sociological and artistic factors behind the international success of Korean dramas. They also explored what sets these productions apart from other global works, highlighting how South Korea has transformed its dramas into soft power. The program concluded on April 17 with a public talk show titled The Charm of Korean Dramas held at the Istituto Culturale Coreano, with opening remarks by Kim Choon-goo, the Korean Ambassador to Italy.

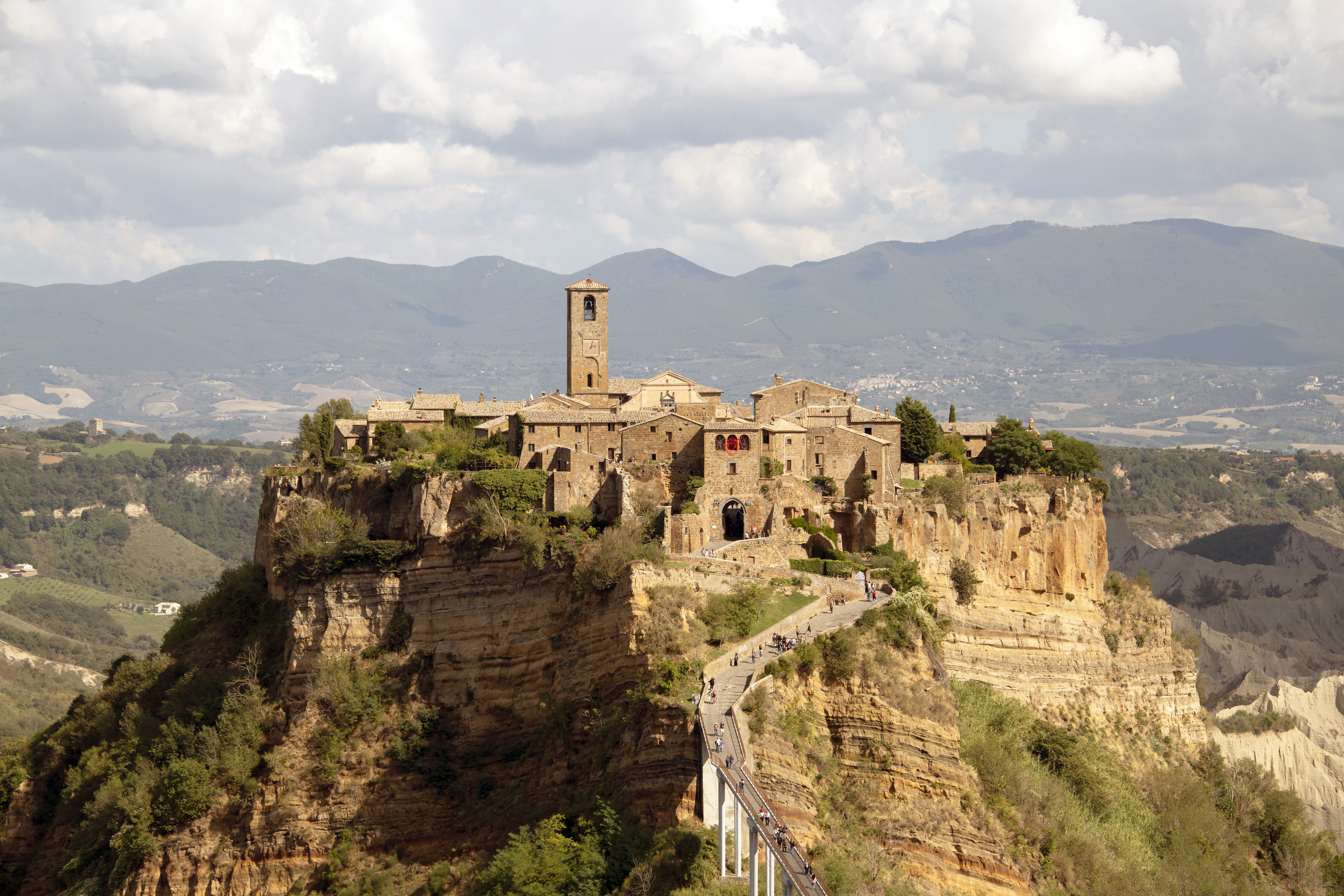
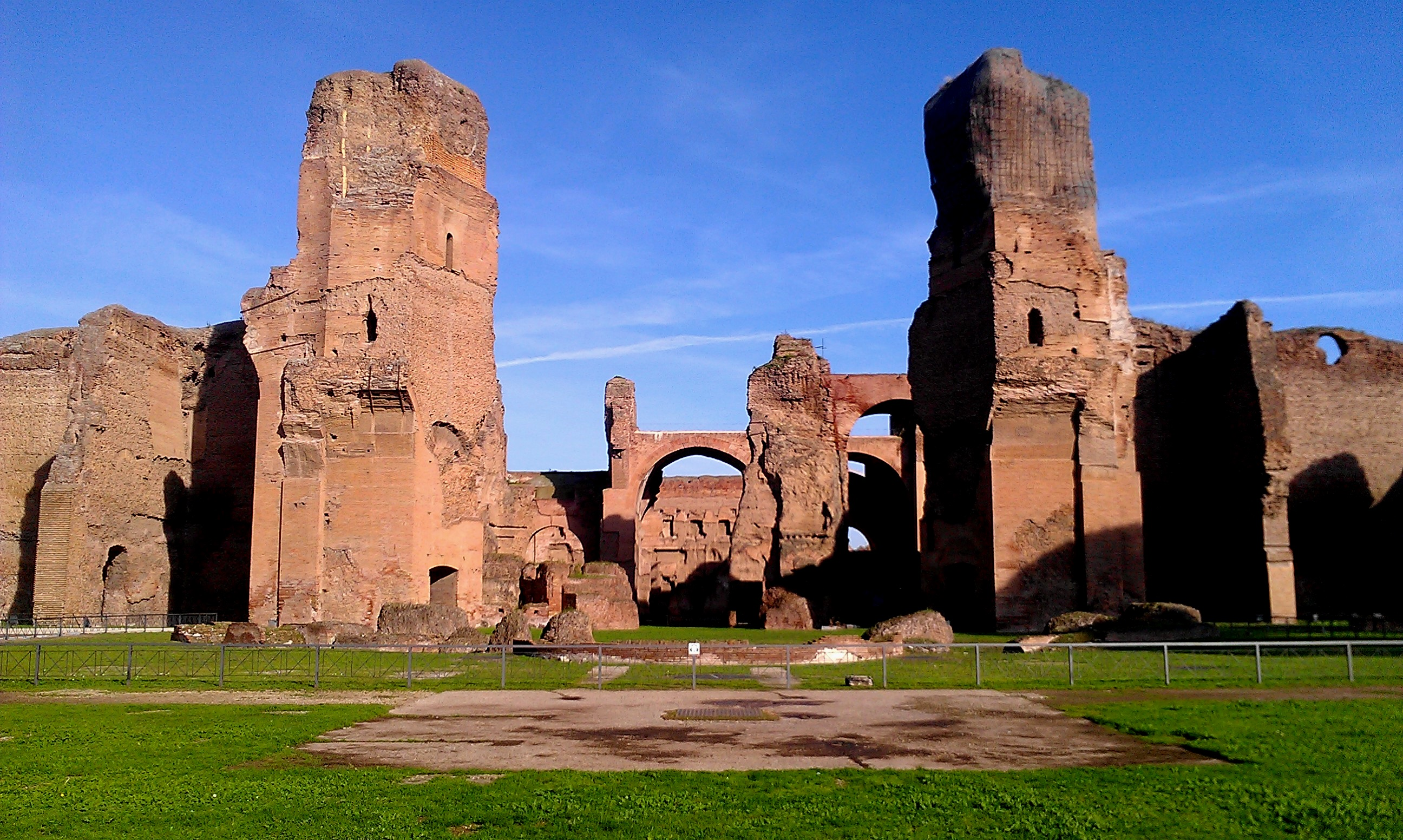
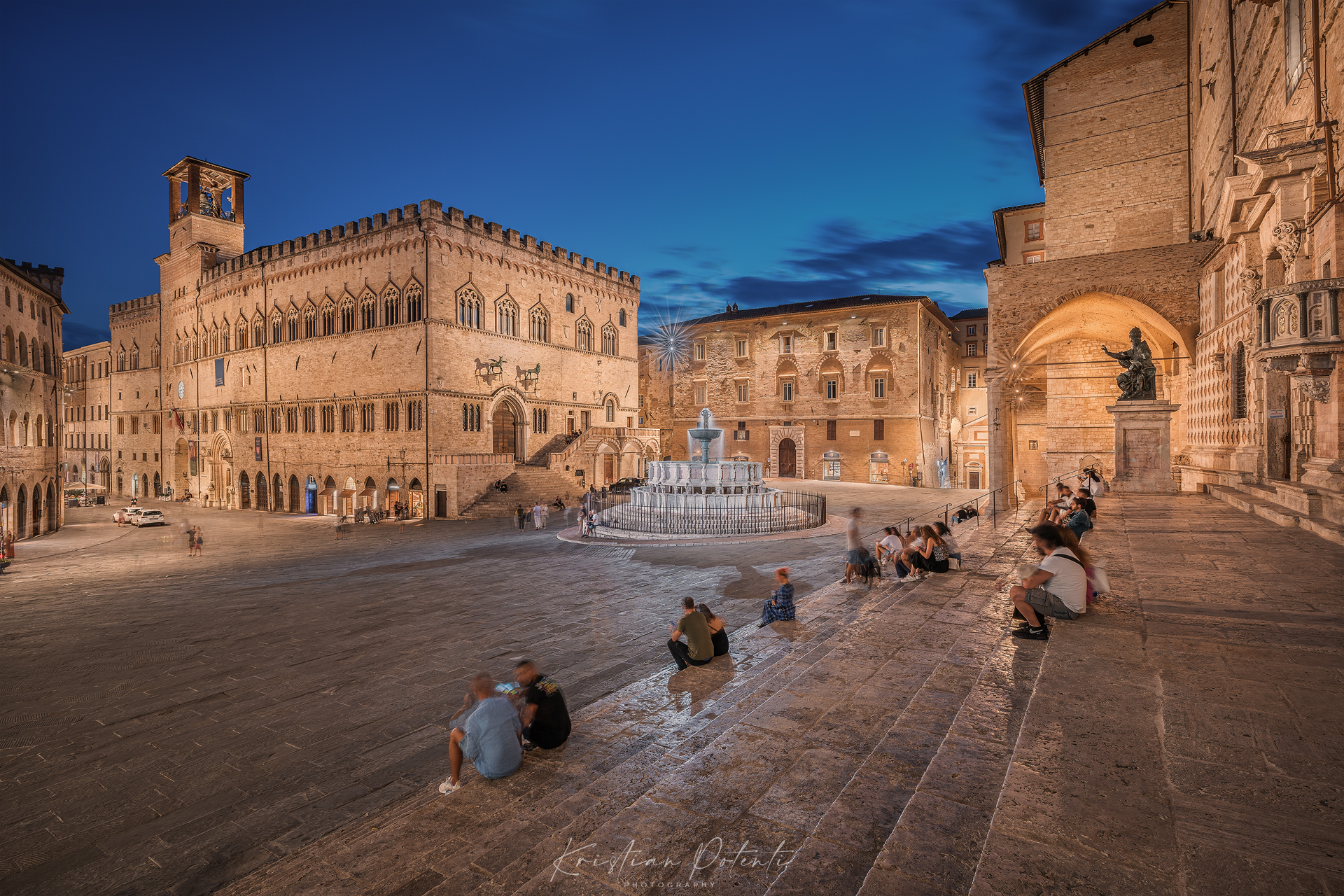
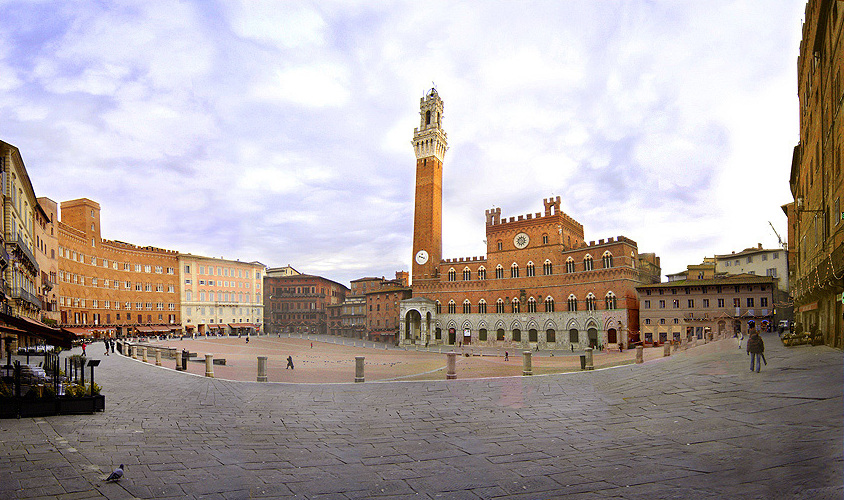
Filming locations for Can This Love be Translated in Italy: the Civita Bagnoregio in Lazio (upper left), the Baths of Caracalla in Rome (upper right), the Piazza IV Novembre in Perugia (lower left) and the Piazza del Campo in Siena (lower right).

Cultural exchanges continued with the sixth Ciao! Italia festival, co-hosted by Chuncheon City and the Italian Embassy in Korea, which ran from June 12 to 14, 2026. Hosted by Alberto Mondi and announcer Kim Sia, the festival featured humanities programs, including a special lecture by Professor Gu Ji-hoon on medieval Italian cities at the World Liquor Market Lounge. Using Can This Love Be Translated? as a framework, he discussed the characteristics of Italian urban culture, such as squares and fountains.

During an MBC Radio interview discussing her time accompanying President Lee Jae-myung on a June diplomatic visit to Italy, Blue House Senior Spokesperson Kang Yoo-jung shared insights from high-level meetings with Italy's president, prime minister, and the Governor of Tuscany in Florence. Kang noted that Italian leadership brought up watching Korean dramas during bilateral cultural exchanges. Kang specifically mentioned Can This Love Be Translated?, which was filmed in the small Tuscan town of Montalcino. She shared that the location's tourism transformed after production, noting that the town previously saw very few visitors, but international travelers and Korean tourists have since flocked to the area and queued to see the filming sites, showcasing the tangible global influence of Korean culture. Italian media also reported similar tourism surges in the Lazio, with Korean visitors arriving at Piazzale Battaglini in Civita di Bagnoregio, alongside other locations prominently featured in the tenth episode, such as Porta Santa Maria and the Valle dei Calanchi.

==== Canada ====
While Italian and Japanese tourism grew organically from the series, tourism in Canada was strategically planned. Ahead of the premiere of the Netflix original Can This Love Be Translated?, Alberta Tourism Minister Andrew Boitchenko and Travel Alberta representatives met with WestJet and Netflix Korea in Seoul on September 1, 2025, with the shared goal of promoting long-term tourism by leveraging the show's filming locations. At a press conference, Lee Young-sook of Destination Canada's Korea office noted that the drama showcases Alberta's diverse landscapes, including Calgary, Canadian Rocky Mountain, and the Badlands. She suggested that the potential tourism impact could mirror the visitation surge Quebec experienced following the 2016 drama Guardian: The Lonely and Great God.

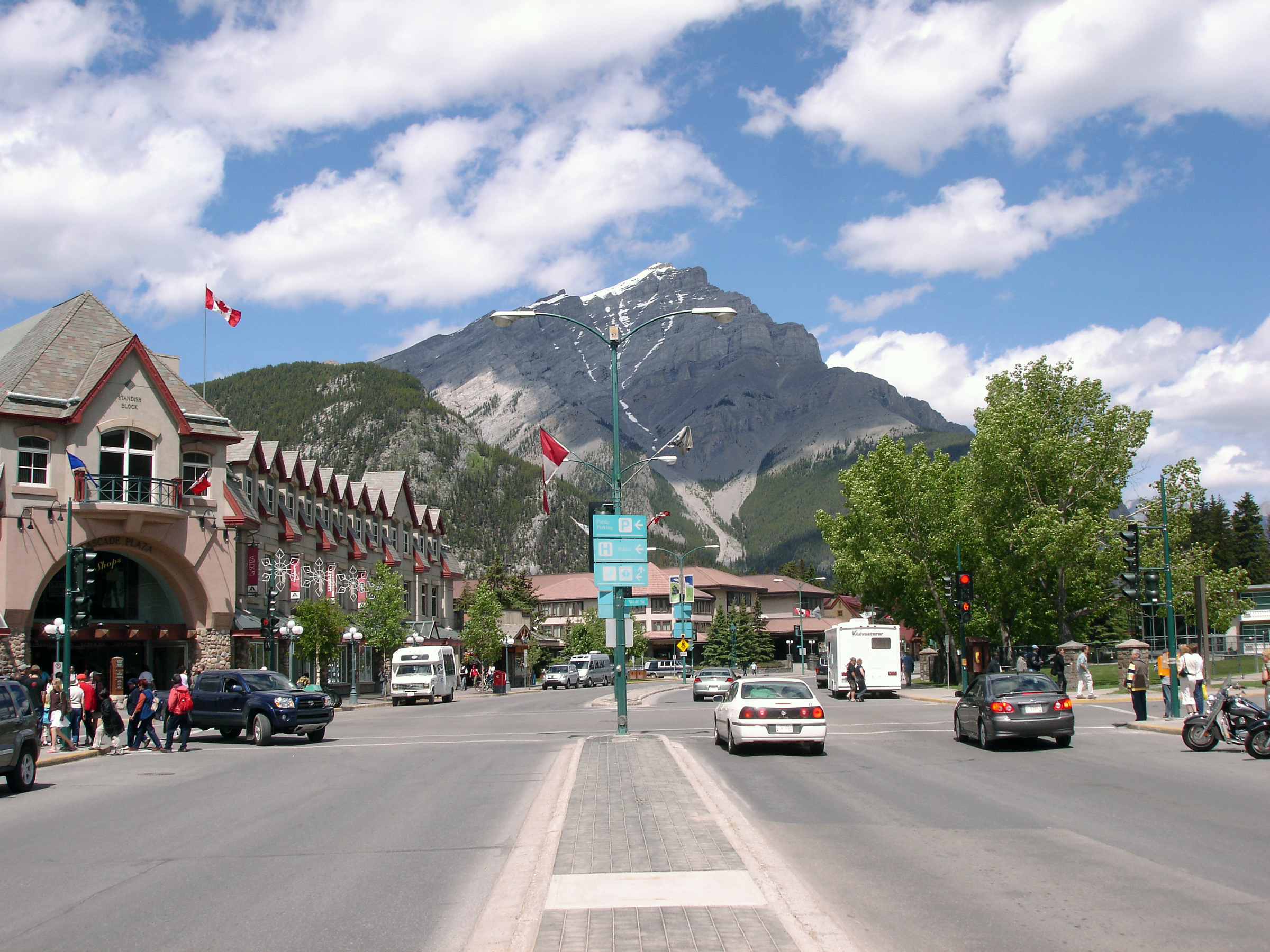
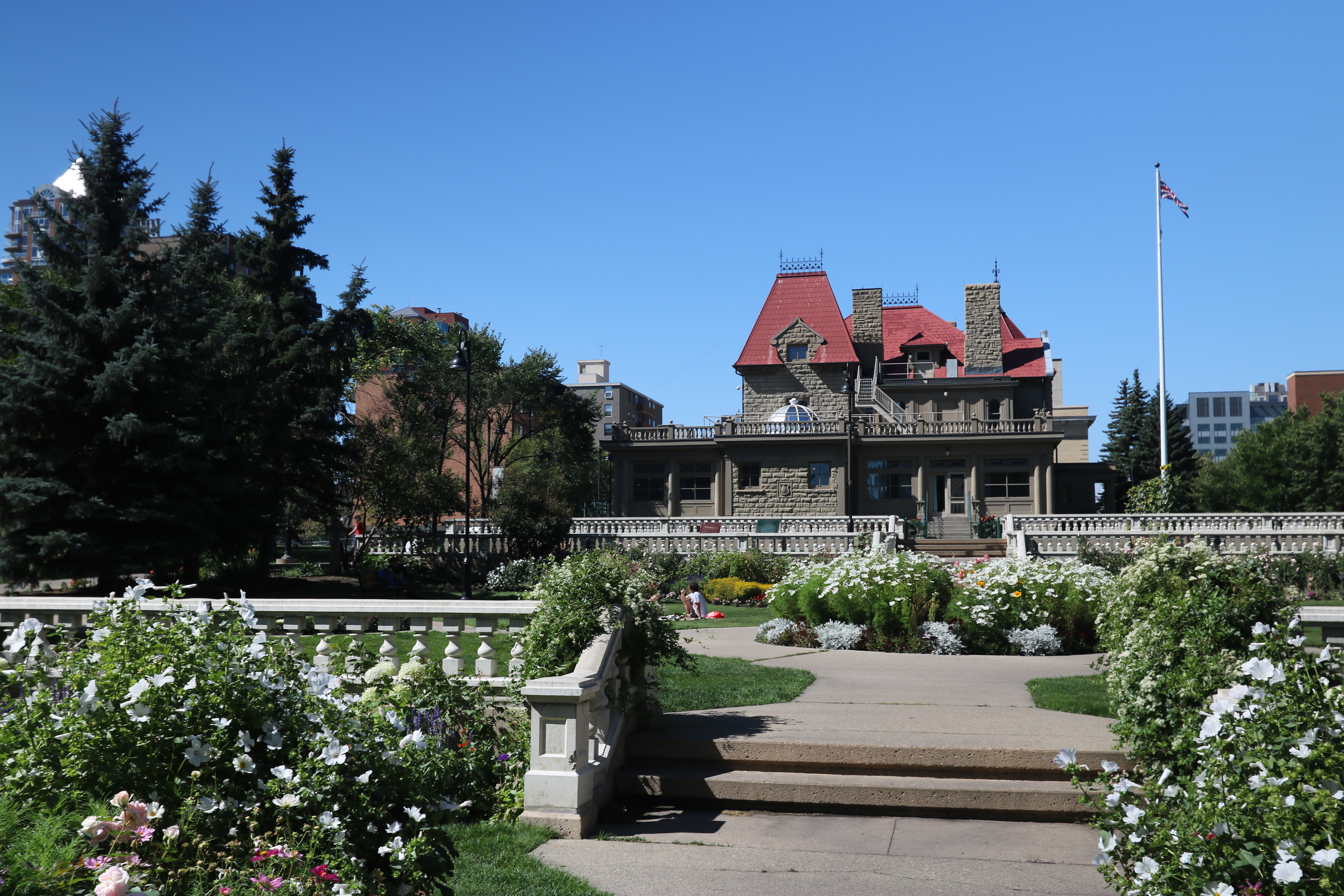
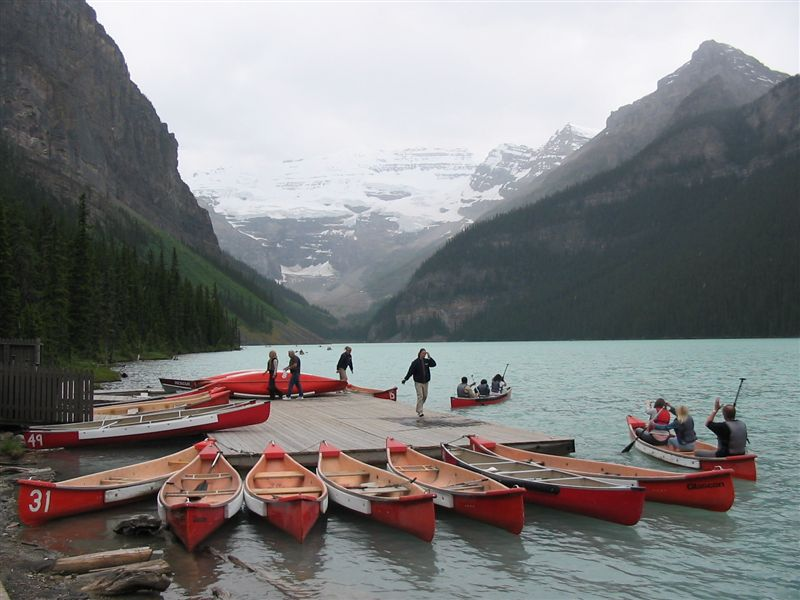
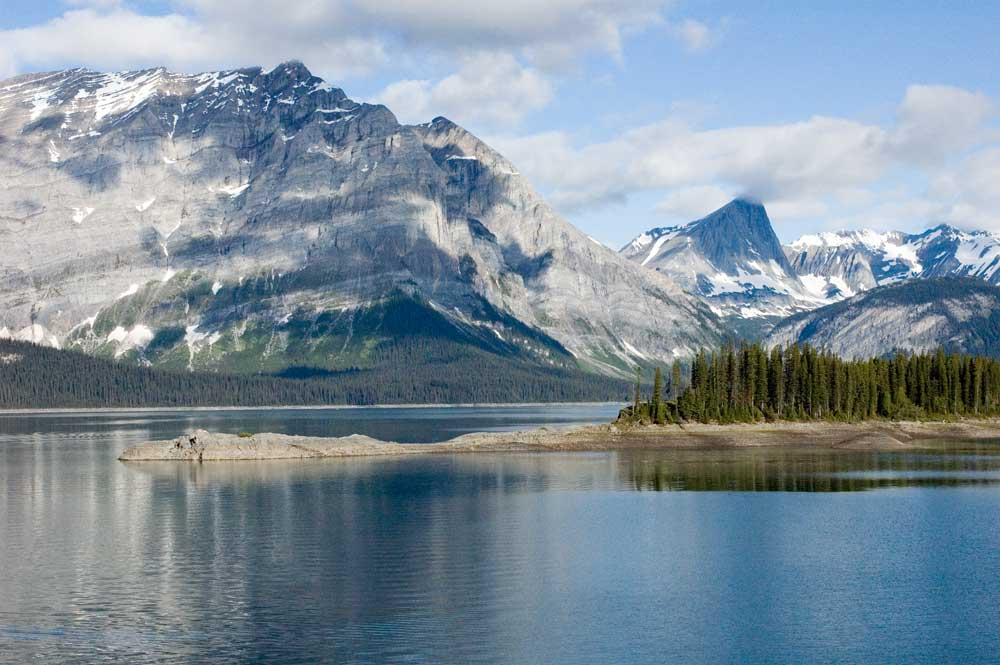
Filming locations for Can This Love be Translated in Canada: Town of Banff (upper left), Lougheed House Calgary (upper right), Lake Louis (lower left) and Upper Kananaskis (lower right).

Post-premiere promotions accelerated in January 2026. On January 26, Destination Canada partnered with the travel platform Tripbtoz to launch an Alberta-focused marketing campaign. This was followed on January 29 by the "2026 Alberta Product Development Seminar" co-hosted by the Alberta Tourism Board, Destination Canada, and WestJet. Alberta Tourism Director Cho Min-seon presented filming locations and behind-the-scenes content to approximately 50 travel industry professionals. WestJet executives projected that sustained demand driven by the series would lead to an extension of the Incheon–Calgary seasonal route. The updated schedule runs from March 30 to November 9, 2026, with service frequency increasing to six weekly flights.

On February 4, Destination Canada partnered with Netflix to leverage the global reach of Can This Love Be Translated? After its January release, the series topped charts in 15 countries and reached the Top 10 in 60, including key markets like France, Japan, and Mexico. The series became a catalyst for the "High-value Experiences Group" (HEG), a demographic of 1.6 million travelers seeking Canada's autumn scenery. Alberta Tourism Minister Andrew Boitchenko credited the show with boosting the province's global profile. Travel Alberta and Destination Canada subsequently released official filming location guides in English and Korean, respectively. The series is also featured on Netflix under its "In Your Neighbourhood" tool, which categorizes the show under romantic dramas, romantic comedies, and Korean programming. The feature maps filming locations across southern Alberta, to highlight how the production intersects with local communities.

By February 15, Tripbtoz reported that provincial accommodation reservations had doubled. Demand centered on Banff and Canmore, while bookings near Calgary International Airport also rose as travelers sought a balance between logistical convenience and proximity to filming sites. On February 18, Hana Tour also reported increased interest in the Canadian Rockies, identifying Quarry Lake in Canmore as a frequently requested site following its appearance in a scene featuring lead actors Kim Seon-ho and Go Yoon-jung. Data from May indicated continued economic impact. Mark Ham, executive director of Film Commissions and Cultural Industries, reported over 23,500 views for Travel Alberta's campaign materials, while campaign partners estimated 3,316 bookings generating approximately $15 million CAD in economic value. By July, local artist Jason Carter noted a surge in visitors to Quarry Lake, which included increased foot traffic to his nearby gallery.

Speaking at Rendezvous Canada 2026 in May, Tourism Canada Vice President Gloria Lowry stated that the series is inspiring Korean travelers by showcasing Canadian provincial cities. In June, WestJet Deputy General Manager Lee Jung-hoon reported strong performance figures, noting a 95% load factor for April and May, with peak-season bookings for July and August reaching the 70% range by the end of May, bolstered significantly by travel demand stimulated by the series. On June 10, Air Canada and Travel Alberta hosted a travel agency seminar in Seoul, during which Tourism Canada and Tourism Alberta representative Lee Young-sook stated that Canada is thriving as a themed destination, highlighting that Can This Love Be Translated? has driven a surge in Korean tourism to Calgary and the Badlands. Tourism Alberta Director Jo Min-sun also outlined the region's geographical advantages and key destination highlights at the event.

== Accolades ==
=== Awards and nominations ===
Awards and nominations received by the series
Award ceremony	Year	Category	Recipient(s)	Result	Ref.
Asia Star Entertainer Awards	2026	Best Character (Actress)	Go Youn-jung	Won	
Asia Star Entertainer Awards	2026	Best OTT Artist	Go Youn-jung	Won	
Asia Star Entertainer Awards	2026	Fan Choice Couple	Kim Seon-ho and Go Youn-jung	Nominated	
Baeksang Arts Awards	2026	Best Director – Television	Yoo Young-eun	Nominated	
Blue Dragon Series Awards	2026	Best Actor	Kim Seon-ho	Nominated	
Blue Dragon Series Awards	2026	Best Actress	Go Youn-jung	Nominated	
Blue Dragon Series Awards	2026	Popularity Award — Actor	Kim Seon-ho	Nominated	
Blue Dragon Series Awards	2026	Popularity Award — Actress	Go Youn-jung	Won	
Blue Dragon Series Awards	2026	Popularity Award — OST	"Daydream" by Wendy	Nominated	
Blue Dragon Series Awards	2026	Popularity Award — OST	"Love Language" by Kim Min-seok	Nominated	
Blue Dragon Series Awards	2026	Global Icon	Go Youn-jung	Won	
Fundex Awards	2026	Best OTT Drama	Can This Love Be Translated	Pending	
Fundex Awards	2026	Best Actress of OTT Original Drama	Go Youn-jung	Pending	
Fundex Awards	2026	Popular Star Prize – K-Drama Actor	Kim Seon-ho	Nominated	
Fundex Awards	2026	Popular Star Prize – K-Drama Actress	Go Youn-jung	Nominated	
Global OTT Awards	2026	Best Original Song	"Love Language" by Kim Min-seok	Won	
Global OTT Awards	2026	Best Lead Actor	Kim Seon-ho	Nominated	
Global OTT Awards	2026	People's Choice Award — Male Actor	Kim Seon-ho	Nominated	
Korea Content Awards	2026	Contribution to the development of the broadcasting and video industry	Yoo Young-eun	Pending	
Korea Drama Awards	2026	Best Drama	Can This Love Be Translated?	Nominated	
MAMA Awards	2026	Best Original Soundtrack	"Love Language" by Kim Min-seok	Won	
Melon Music Awards	2026	Best OST	"Love Language" by Kim Min-seok	Won	
SEC Awards (Note: The SEC Awards, formerly known as the Séries em Cena Awards, is a Brazilian award show that honors achievements in music, film, television, and internet culture in Brazil and globally.)	2026	Best Asian Series	Can This Love Be Translated?	Nominated	
SEC Awards	2026	Performance in an Asian Series	Kim Seon-ho	Nominated	
Seoul International Drama Awards	2026	International category — Best Actor	Kim Seon-ho	Nominated	
Seoul International Drama Awards	2026	International category — Best Actress	Go Youn-jung	Nominated	
Seoul International Drama Awards	2026	Outstanding Asian Star	Go Youn-jung	Nominated	
Seoul International Drama Awards	2026	Outstanding Asian Star	Kim Seon-ho	Nominated	
Seoul International Drama Awards	2026	Outstanding OST	"Daydream" by Wendy	Nominated	
Seoul International Drama Awards	2026	Outstanding OST	"Love Language" by Kim Min-seok	Nominated	
Seoul International Drama Awards	2026	Outstanding OST	"Promise" by Wonstein	Nominated	

=== Listicles ===
Name of publisher, year listed, name of listicle, and placement
Publisher	Year	Listicle	Placement	Ref.
Best of Korea	2026	50 Best Korean Dramas on Netflix	Best 50	
Cine21	2026	Netflix's 10 Years Best 10	Best 10	
Collider	2026	10 Perfect K-Dramas You Should Watch in 2026	8th	
Collider	2026	The 7 Most Perfect K-Dramas of the Last 15 Years, Ranked	4th	
Esquire India	2026	5 best K-dramas of 2026 (so far)	Top 5	
GQ India	2026	Best K-drama releases of January 2026	1st	
GQ India	2026	5 best K-dramas of 2026 (so far)	Top 5	
Joy News24	2026	Best Drama of the Year	Shortlisted	
Joy News24	2026	Best Drama Couple of the Year	Runner-up	
Joy News24	2026	Best Actor of the Year (Kim Seon-ho)	9th	
Joy News24	2026	Best Actor of the Year (Go Youn-jung)	10th	
Joy News24	2026	Power People of the Year	Shortlisted	
Korea Drama Festival	2026	All That Drama: The most loved Korean TV drama of 2026	Top 32	
Marie Claire	2026	I've Binged Dozens of Netflix K-Dramas. These Are the Ones I've Loved in 2026	Top 22	
Parade	2026	These 54 K-Dramas Are Worth Losing Sleep Over	Top 54	
Vogue Hongkong	2026	Best Romantic K-Dramas To Watch In 2026	Top 7	
