= Yoo Young-eun =

South Korean filmmaker (born 1990)

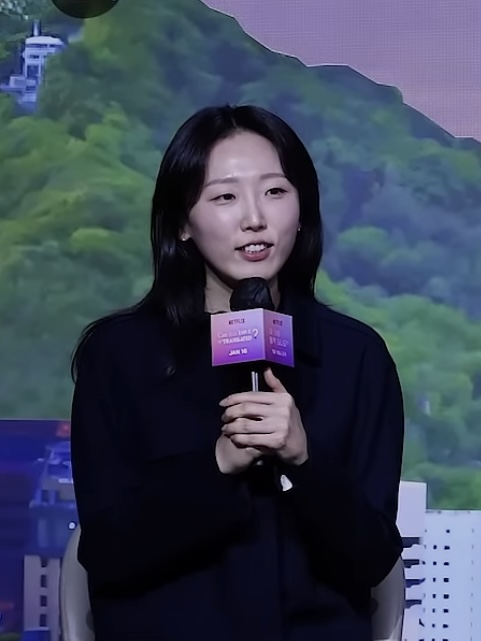
- Yoo in 2026
- Born: 1990 (age 35–36); South Korea
- Occupation: Television Director
- Years active: 2016–present

Korean name
- Hangul: 유영은
- RR: Yu Yeongeun
- MR: Yu Yŏngŭn

Yoo Young-eun (Korean: 유영은; born 1990) is a South Korean television director that started her career in KBS. She worked as assistant director in drama like Descendants of the Sun, Queen of Mystery, Manhole, and Queen of Mystery 2. Her directorial debut as main director was in KBS Drama Special 2018, and she also worked on KBS Drama Special 2019 and KBS Drama Special 2020. In 2019, She received the 22nd Gender Equality Award for KBS Drama Special — Socialization: Understanding of Dance. She also directed television series How to Buy a Friend (2020) and won the 243rd PD of the Month Award. Her first historical drama, Bloody Heart, was screened at the 31st Energa Camerimaju International Film Festival and was longlisted in 2022 Rose d'Or Awards.

== Early life ==
Yoo Young-eun's passion for television dramas began at a young age. Her interest was sparked by the popular series Winter Sonata when she was in elementary school. By the time she reached her third year of middle school, she had decided to pursue a career as a director and started preparing to enter the broadcasting industry.

== Career ==
=== Early Career and Assistant Directing (2012-2017) ===
Yoo Young-eun began her career in 2012 by joining the KBS Drama Department. During this initial phase, she gained experience as an assistant director on several notable KBS dramas, including Descendants of the Sun, Queen of Mystery, Manhole, and Queen of Mystery 2.

=== Directorial Debut and KBS Drama Specials (2018-2019) ===
Yoo transitioned to main director in 2018, helming two episodes of the KBS Drama Special anthology series. Her official directorial debut came with KBS Drama Special: Too Bright for Romance (Episode 4, aired October 5, 2018), based on Kim Geum-hee's novel of the same name which had won the grand prize at the 7th Young Artist Award in 2016. The drama featured a reunion with Choi Kang-hee and co-starred Lee Won-keun. Later that year, she directed the seventh installment of KBS Drama Special: Dreamers (aired October 25, 2018), written by Baek So-yeon, which depicted characters coping with loss through dreams, Jin-wook (played by Lee Hak-joo) and Se-young (played by Kim Sae-byuk). Yoo cast Kim Joo-hun in both projects after being impressed by his theater performances.

In the following year, Yoo directed the KBS Drama Special Socialization: Understanding of Dance. Her direction earned her the prestigious Minister Award (Grand Prize) in the drama category at the 22nd Media Award for Gender Equality (Note: The Gender Equality Media Award is an awards ceremony organized by the Korea Gender Equality Education Promotion Agency under the Ministry of Gender Equality and Family (MOGEF). It was established in 1999 to recognize and honor broadcast reports that contribute to the promotion of gender equality values in South Korean society.)

=== First Series and Continued Drama Specials (2020) ===
2020 marked Yoo's series directorial debut with How to Buy a Friend. Based on Laad Kwon's Daum webtoon Friendship Contract, the KBS2 series aired April 6–14, 2020 followed teenagers Heo Don-hyuk (Shin Seung-ho) and Park Chan-hong (Lee Shin-young) in a protective pact while investigating a suicide. Yoo received significant acclaim for her "sensuous and beautiful visualization," winning the 243rd PD of the Month Awards.

That same year, Yoo directed the KBS Drama Special: Trace of Love. Written by Jeong Hyun, the drama examines a past relationship as former lovers confront lingering emotions. The plot follows Lee Joo-young (Lee Yoo-young), an architectural office assistant manager, who is reunited with her ex-boyfriend Ji-seop (Lee Sang-yeob).

=== Historical Drama and Critical Acclaim (2022) ===
"In particular, director Yoo Young-eun was someone who trusted and waited for the moment when the true emotions of the actor and the role came out."

— Kang Han-na about Yoo Young-eun, Esquire Korea Interview

Yoo ventured into historical drama with Bloody Heart in 2022. As her first 16-episode project, the show featured an ensemble cast including Lee Joon, Kang Han-na, Jang Hyuk, Park Ji-yeon, Heo Sung-tae, and Choi Ri. It aired on KBS2 from May 2 to June 21, 2022, and was available for streaming on Disney+ in selected regions. Yoo noted that the Korean title, Red Single Heart, signifies an unchanging, sincere heart, reflecting the show's themes of loyalty and passion. The series was lauded for its stunning visuals and powerful acting performances. Furthermore, it was longlisted for the 2022 Rose d'Or Awards. Bloody Heart was selected for the TV Series Competition at the 31st Energa Camerimage International Film Festival, where it received a Golden Frog nomination.

=== Streaming series with Netflix (2026) ===
In 2023, Yoo was announced as the director of the romantic comedy Can This Love Be Translated?, written by the Hong Sisters. Netflix confirmed the production on June 27, 2024, announcing a cast including Kim Seon-ho, Go Yoon-jung, Sota Fukushi, Lee Yi-dam, and Choi Woo-sung. The series was produced by Imaginus and its subsidiaries Studio Sot and Trii Studio, with visual effects handled by Studio High. Production preparations were completed in June 2024, filming took place in South Korea as well as international locations including Kamakura and Enoshima in Japan, Alberta in Canada and Lazio, Umbria and Tuscany in Italy from June 2024 to February 2025.

The series follows the romance between polyglot interpreter Joo Ho-jin (Kim Seon-ho) and global actress Cha Mu-hee (Go Youn-jung) as they navigate differing love languages. The series reached the Top 10 in 60 countries and topped the global non-English chart for two consecutive weeks following its premiere. The series remained in the Top 10 for five weeks, accumulating over 271 million viewing hours and 20.6 million views during its first seven weeks. Later, the Netflix engagement report for the first half of 2026, released on July 17, 2026, recorded the series ranking 19th globally with 28.6 million views and 377,700,000 hours viewed. Critics praised the leads' chemistry, the emotional pacing, and the use of international filming locations. The production was credited with increasing tourism to its filming sites, notably Alberta, Canada.

On April 14, 2026, the Istituto Culturale Coreano announced that Yoo and producer Lee Hyun-young would lead drama workshops and lectures in Rome. Two days later, they conducted a professional workshop at the Centro Sperimentale di Cinematografia, focusing on the creative process and on practical challenges specific to filming in Italy. Later that afternoon, they delivered a lecture to approximately 200 students at Sapienza University of Rome addressing the sociological and artistic factors behind the international success of Korean dramas. They also explored what sets these productions apart from other global works, highlighting how South Korea has transformed its dramas into soft power. The program concluded on April 17 with a public talk show titled The Charm of Korean Dramas held at the Istituto Culturale Coreano, with opening remarks by Kim Choon-goo, the Korean Ambassador to Italy.

== Filmography ==
Directing credits
Year	Title		Network	Credited as		Note(s)	Ref.
Year	English	Korean	Network	Assistant Director	Director	Note(s)	Ref.
2016	Descendants of the Sun	태양의 후예	KBS2	Partial (Note: with Kim-joon)	Lee Eung-bok; Baek Sang-hoon	Series	
2017	Queen of Mystery	추리의 여왕	KBS2	Yes	Kim Jin-woo	Series	
2017	Manhole	맨홀: 이상한 나라의 필	KBS2	Partial (Note: with Kang Byung-seok)	Park Man-young	Series	
2018	Queen of Mystery 2	추리의 여왕 2	KBS2	Yes	Choi Yoon-Suk	Series	
2018	KBS Drama Special — Too Bright for Romance	드라마 스페셜 시즌9 <너무 한낮의 연애>	KBS2	—N/a	Yes	one act-drama	
2018	KBS Drama Special — Dreamers	드라마 스페셜 시즌9 <도피자들>	KBS2	—N/a	Yes	one act-drama	
2019	KBS Drama Special — Socialization: Understanding of Dance	드라마 스페셜 2019 <사교-땐스의 이해>	KBS2	—N/a	Yes	one act-drama	
2020	KBS Drama Special — Traces of love	KBS 드라마 스페셜 2020 <연애의 흔적>	KBS2	—N/a	Yes	one act-drama	
2020	How to Buy a Friend	계약우정	KBS2	Lee Hyun-kyung; Jang Min-seok	Yes	Television mini-series	
2022	Bloody Heart	붉은 단심	KBS2	—N/a	Yes	Television mini-series	
2026	Can This Love Be Translated?	이 사랑 통역 되나요?	Netflix	—N/a	Yes	Netflix original series	

== Accolades ==
=== Awards and nominations ===
Awards and nominations
Award ceremony	Year	Category	Nominee / Work	Result	Ref.
Baeksang Arts Awards	2026	Best Director – Television	Can This Love Be Translated?	Nominated	
31st International Film Festival of the Art of Cinematography Camerimage	2023	Golden Frog	Bloody Heart	Nominated	
Korea UHD Awards	2018	Best Drama	KBS Drama Special — Too Bright for Romance	Won	
22nd Media Award for Gender Equality	2019	Minister Award (Grand Prize)	KBS Drama Special: Socialization: Understanding of Dance	Won	
243rd PD of the Month Awards (Note: The PD of the Month Award, hosted by the Korea PD Association, pursues the public interest of broadcasting and encourages PDs and writers who produce programs that bring joy and emotion to viewers, improving program production conditions, promoting freedom of expression, and promoting public awareness. The purpose is to contribute to the development of broadcasting and society through rights protection.)	2020	TV drama PD of the Month	How to Buy a Friend	Won	
Rose d'Or (Note: The Golden Rose Award is an international award recognized for its history and authority, founded by the Swiss Broadcasting Company in 1961 and developed into a major event of the European Broadcasting Union (EBU). The purpose is to select and recognize outstanding and creative TV and radio program production.)	2022	Best TV drama	Bloody Heart	Longlisted	
