= We Are the Night =

We Are the Night may refer to:

- We Are the Night (album), 2007 album by The Chemical Brothers
- We Are the Night (film), 2010 German film
- We Are The Night (band), South Korean indie rock band
