= We Are The Night (band) =

South Korean indie rock band

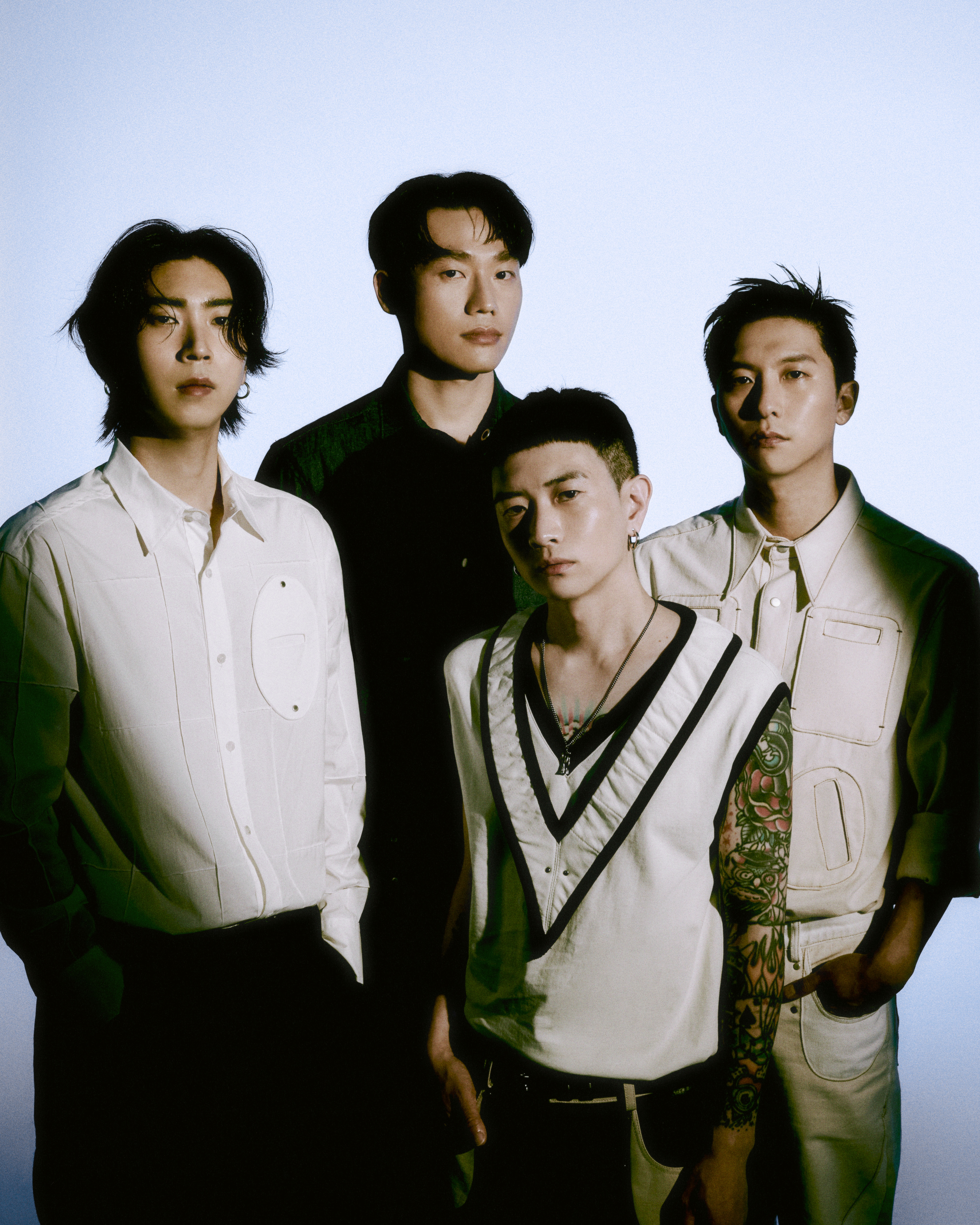

Background information
- Origin: South Korea
- Genre: Indie rock
- Years active: 2013–present
- Labels: Ruby Records; big.wav Music
- Members: Ham Byeong-seon; Jeong Won-jung; Hwang Seong-su; Kim Bo-ram
- Past members: Ham Phillip

We Are The Night (Korean: 위아더나잇) is a South Korean indie rock band that debuted in 2013. The group consists of members Ham Byeong-seon (vocals), Jeong Won-jung (guitar), Hwang Seong-su (bass), and Kim Bo-ram (drums). The group has released two studio albums, We Are The Night (2013), and Vertigo (2019), as well as three EPS, Star, Fire, Night and Such Things (2015), The Green Ray (2016), and Calm Myself Down (2017).

In 2024, their song "Tiramisu Cake", originally released in 2015 as part of Star, Fire, Night and Such Things, went viral on social media.

== Career ==
We Are The Night contributed the track "Good bye" to the original soundtrack for the Netflix series Can This Love Be Translated?, which follows the romance between interpreter Joo Ho-jin and actress Cha Mu-hee. It was released on January 16, 2026.

== Discography ==
=== Studio albums ===
Title	Album details	Peak chart positions
Title	Album details	KOR
We Are The Night	Released: April 25, 2013; Label: Ruby Records; Formats: CD, digital download	61
Vertigo (아, 이 어지러움)	Released: April 28, 2019; Label: big.wav Music; Formats: CD, digital download	95

=== Extended plays ===
Title	Album details	Peak chart positions
Title	Album details	KOR
Star, Fire, Night and Such Things (별, 불, 밤 이런 것들)	Released: October 15, 2015; Label: Ruby Records; Formats: CD, digital download	—
The Green Ray (녹색광선)	Released: October 18, 2016; Label: Ruby Records; Formats: CD, digital download	70
Calm Myself Down (들뜬 마음 가라앉히고)	Released: November 5, 2017; Label: big.wav Music; Formats: CD, digital download	—
"—" denotes release did not chart.

=== Soundtrack Appearances ===
Title	Year	Peak chart positions	Album
Title	Year	KOR	Album
"Good bye"	2026	—	Can This Love Be Translated? OST

== Awards and nominations ==
Year	Award	Category	Nominated work	Result	Ref.
2016	Korean Music Awards	Best Dance & Electronic Album	Star, Fire, Night and Such Things	Nominated	
