= Cha Mu-hee =

Can This Love Be Translated protagonist

- Can This Love Be Translated character
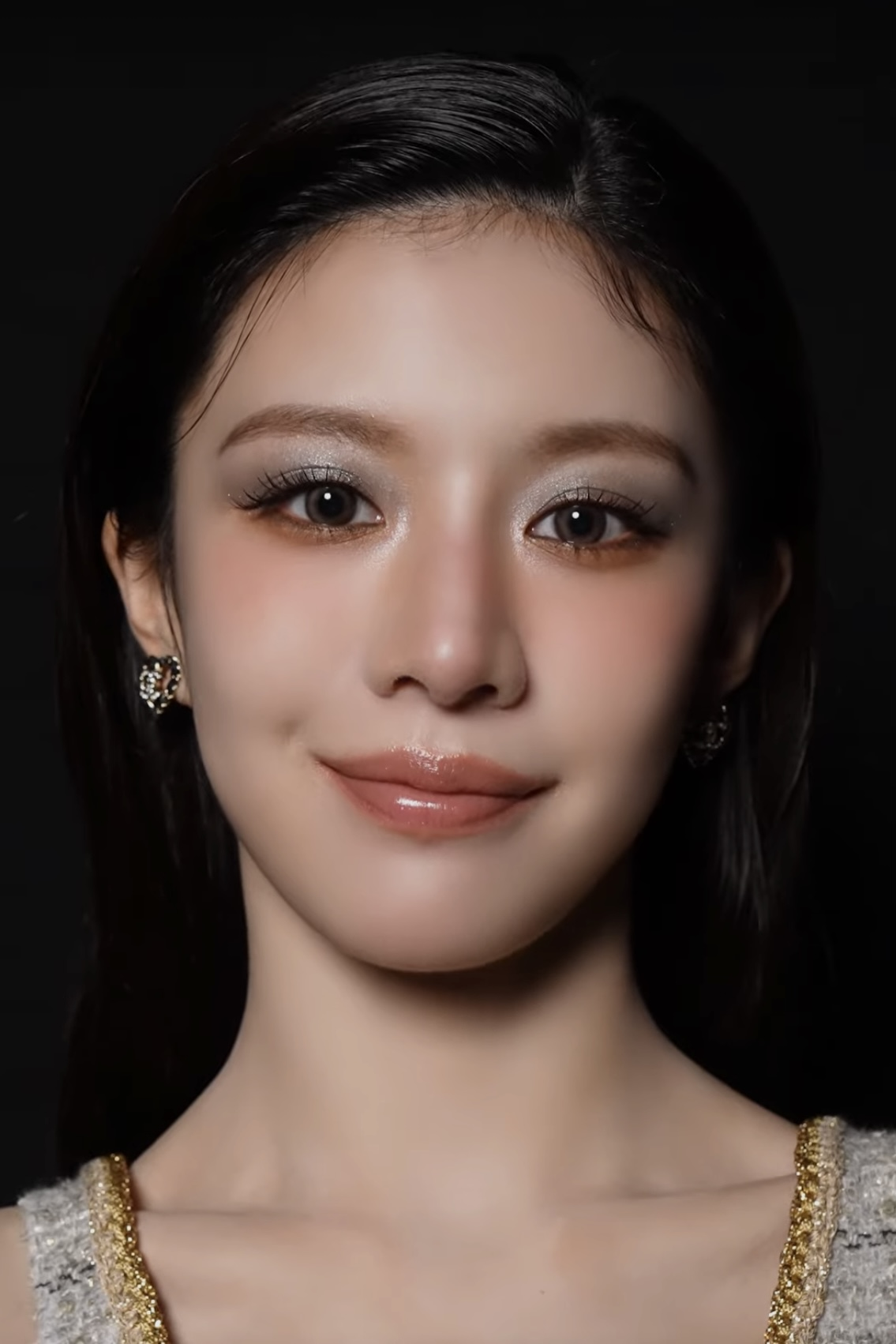
- Go Youn-jung
- First appearance: Episode 1
- Last appearance: Episode 12
- Created by: Hong Jeong-eun; Hong Mi-ran
- Portrayed by: Go Youn-jung (adult); Ahn Tae-rin (child)

In-universe information
- Full name: Cha Mu-hee

Korean name
- Hangul: 차무희
- RR: Cha Muhui
- MR: Ch'a Muhŭi
- Nickname: Do Ra-mi (Note: Her character name in film The Quiet Woman. Later, she also named her alter-ego as Do Ra-mi)
- Gender: Female
- Occupation: actress
- Family: Cha Chairman (adopted father/paternal uncle); Mrs. Cha(adopted mother/paternal uncle's wife)
- Significant other: Joo Ho-jin
- Origin: Seoul
- Nationality: South Korean
- Birthday: May 23, 1995

Cha Mu-hee (Korean: 차무희), along with her alter ego Do Ra-mi (도라미) is a fictional character and the protagonist of the South Korean romantic-comedy series Can This Love Be Translated? which premiered on Netflix on January 16, 2026. The series was written by the screenwriting duo Hong Jung-eun and Hong Mi-ran, collectively known as the Hong sisters, and directed by Yoo Young-eun. The character is portrayed by actress Go Youn-jung.

In the series, Cha is an aspiring actress who becomes a top star overnight after starring in the horror film The Quiet Woman. The story follows her as she navigates a complex relationship with interpreter Joo Ho-jin, played by Kim Seon-ho, who works for the dating reality show Romantic Trip. The show is filmed in Canada and Italy, where she stars alongside Japanese actor Hiro Kurosawa (Sota Fukushi).

== Character and personality ==
In promotional materials published by Netflix Tudum, Cha Mu-hee is described as an aspiring actress who later lands a breakthrough role as the killer zombie Do Ra-mi in the horror film The Quiet Woman, becoming a global sensation. While she enjoys her newfound fame, she secretly struggles with a long-held belief that she is unworthy of love. Director Yoo Young-eun describes Mu-hee as a bubbly, quirky, and lovable character who suffers from anxiety stemming from her past.

"Mu-hee seems very honest with her emotions, but I think she's also the least honest. [Her emotions] show on her face, but she tries so hard not to show them. [As Mu-hee] I wanted to show a character who is always wearing a complicated expression, not in a scheming type of way but in the sense that her anxieties and traumas are always informing her thoughts" — Go Youn-jung

Within the Myers–Briggs Type Indicator framework, Go identified Mu-hee as an INFP. She appears introverted, imaginative, and emotional, often acting without much planning. Conversely, Do Ra-mi fits the ENTP profile, evidenced by her confidence and comfort in challenging situations. She views arguments as purely intellectual exercises and separates them from her personal emotions.

== Relationship ==
=== Relationship with Joo Ho-jin ===
Joo Ho-jin is main love interest of Cha Mu-hee character. Their chance encounter happens in Shonan, Japan. Mu-hee goes there to confront her ex-boyfriend who worked at a local ramen shop. After knowing that Ho-jin is a skilled interpreter, she begs him to help her face her ex new partner. The two spend time exploring Shonan together before eventually parting ways at an Enoden railway crossing.

Mu-hee reunited with Ho-jin in Seoul during her international interview, where Ho-jin served as her interpreter. When they go to dinner afterward, he asks her to remove a viral photograph of him from her social media to preserve his privacy. They later encounter one another by chance in Japan while staying at the same hotel, where Ho-jin helps an anxious Mu-hee cope with hallucinations of her character, Do Ra-mi, and serves as her interpreter during appointments with a psychiatrist.

Their paths cross again when Mu-hee is cast in Romantic Trip, an overseas reality dating program filmed in Canada and Italy that pairs her with Japanese actor Hiro Kurosawa. Ho-jin is offered a position as an interpreter; after Mu-hee secures the contract, she convinces him to accept the job with the aspiration that they can see the aurora together in Canada. Tensions escalate when Ji-sun arrives as the show's replacement producer. When Mu-hee mistakenly believes Ho-jin is still in love with Ji-sun, she abruptly retreats from their blossoming relationship. Although Ho-jin is a skilled interpreter, he and Mu-hee suffer from personal communication breakdowns. Devastated, Ho-jin attempts to resign from the production.

They eventually meet again at a concert hosted by the Italian Embassy, where Kim Young-hwan manages to invite Mu-hee to Ho-jin's home for dinner before leaving them alone. After Mu-hee departs by taxi, Ho-jin decides to visit her home to deliver an LP, but she ghosts him. The following day, Ho-jin encounters Mu-hee's alternate, trauma-induced persona, Do Ra-mi. Upon realizing that Mu-hee is unaware of their interaction, he follows her to Italy to investigate. Acting as the Romantic Trip professional interpreter by day and a protective handler for Do Ra-mi by night, Ho-jin uncovers the childhood trauma at the root of Mu-hee's psychological state.

== Development ==
=== Concept and creation ===
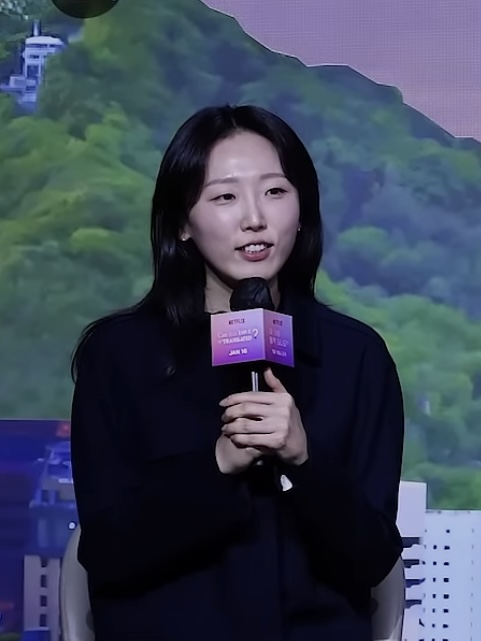
Director Yoo Young-eun during the series' press conference

In 2019, the Hong sisters started developing a tvN television series about an interpreter, with Park Jun-hwa as the director. They originally planned to film in China, however the COVID-19 pandemic forced them to cancel those plans. Production restarted in 2023 under Trii Studio, a subsidiary of Imaginus, which is the parent company of the Hong sisters' label, Studio Sot. Yoo Young-eun took over as director. In June 2024, the series was officially confirmed as a Netflix original series. The Hong sisters had previously had their work Alchemy of Souls distributed exclusively by Netflix, but this was their first Netflix original series. For Yoo, this was the first time she worked with Netflix.

The Hong sisters worked closely with Yoo during the development phase. Their original idea was a romantic comedy about two different personalities who try to bridge their differences through language. That concept shaped the title, scenarios, and characters' jobs. As they developed the script, it evolved from overcoming language barriers to a deeper exploration of how people truly understand each other.

=== Casting ===
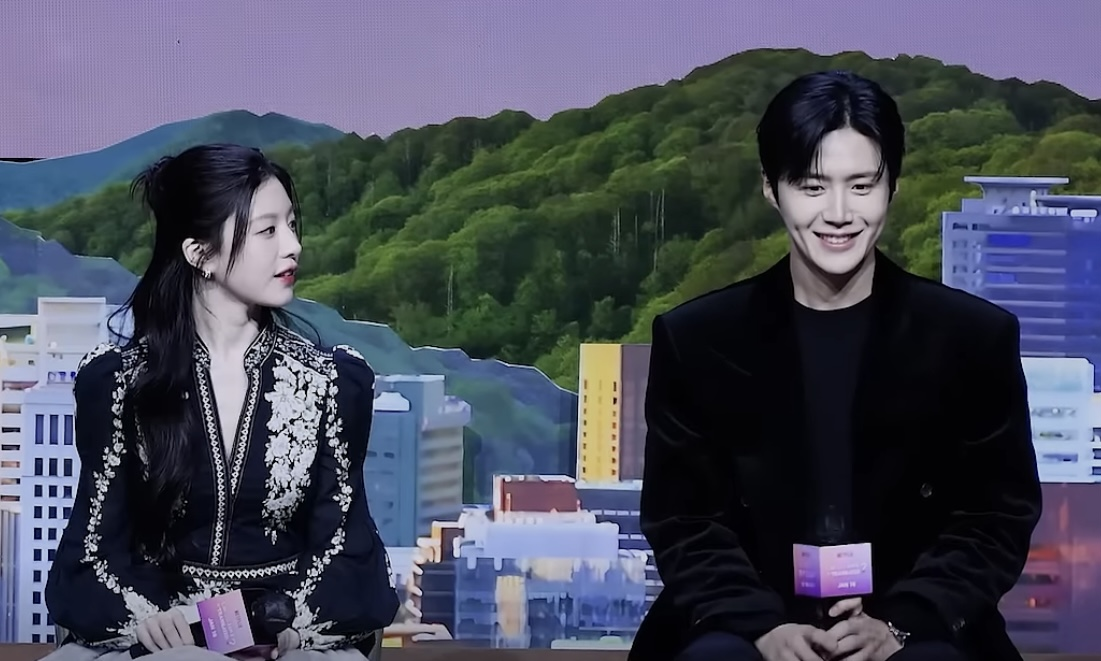
Go Youn-jung (left) and Kim Seon-ho (right) attended the series press conference held on January 13, 2026 (pictured)

After Kim Seon-ho began negotiations for the role of Joo Ho-jin in July 2023, the production team initially engaged in casting discussions for Cha Mu-hee with Han So-hee. Go Youn-jung entered talks for the role of Cha Mu-hee in September 2023. Netflix officially confirmed the final pairing of Go and Kim on June 27, 2024, marking Go's first performance in a romantic comedy.

Director Yoo Young-eun stated that Go was selected for her personality, which mirrored the character's bubbly and transparent demeanor, noting the writers' established professional rapport with the actress from a previous collaboration. In a written interview The Hong sisters expressed their satisfaction with Go, noting, "This is my second project with actress Go Yoon-jung since Alchemy of Souls, and I was convinced that the bright energy she showed back then would be a perfect fit for Mu-hee. It must not have been easy having to play both Mu-hee and her on-screen character, Do Ra-mi, simultaneously, but she pulled it off flawlessly. In particular, the fun of watching actress Go Yoon-jung's glamorous and colorful visuals set against the beautiful backdrops of various countries will be immense."

Having previously worked with the Hong Sisters on Alchemy of Souls, Go said that she was drawn by the writers' unique ability to craft immersive, fairy-tale-like worldviews. She further noted that the dynamic between an interpreter and an actress was a novel premise that resonated with her own professional experiences. She was initially provided with only the first four episodes of the script, remaining unaware of the character's dual nature. Regarding this discovery, she remarked, "At first, I didn't know Do Ra-mi would manifest in reality; I thought she was just a character from The Quiet Woman existing within Cha Mu-hee's delusions. When I discovered Do Ra-mi appears starting in episode 7, it came as a fresh shock. Naturally, I felt pressured, but my excitement outweighed the nerves."

=== Portrayal ===
The screenwriters and director encouraged improvisation throughout production, allowing the cast to contribute ideas that expanded upon the original script. Regarding her process, Go Youn-jung emphasized that thorough preparation is essential to maintaining flexibility on set; while she relies on guidelines for line delivery, this grounding allows an actor to respond naturally to unexpected developments and co-star ad-libs.

Go highlighted the collaborative nature of the production, specifically her work with the writer: "I received a lot of help from the writer, [Hong] Miran. Unlike our previous project, Alchemy of Souls, we held script readings this time. Writer Miran would act out the lines for me, embodying Mu-hee perfectly. Seeing how the creator envisioned the character was eye-opening, and I tried to mirror her performance." She also credited her co-star, Kim Seon-ho, noting his influence on her performance. "Seon-ho Oppa has a wealth of experience in theater, so he is skilled at ad-libbing, utilizing props, and bringing a vivid energy to the set. Since I enjoy observing and imitating others, I followed his lead diligently."

To refine their performances, the actors utilized a rehearsal technique of swapping roles to better grasp character nuances. Go noted that she and Kim played characters opposite to their actual MBTI types, as she identifies as a "thinking" (T) type while Kim is a "feeling" (F) type. Go found the role of Mu-hee challenging, as the character's indirect communication required significant effort to uncover her underlying intentions, whereas she identified more readily with Do Ra-mi, whose directness and honesty were easier to portray. Ultimately, Go viewed Mu-hee's core struggle, the difficulty of communicating true feelings, as the primary hurdle of her performance.

Portraying the dual roles presented technical challenges, particularly during sequences where the characters appeared together. Go utilized a ball attached to a pillar as a focal point to maintain consistent eye contact and manage emotional pacing. To emphasize the lack of a deep connection between the two characters, she varied her gaze height to suggest a disconnect. Conceptually, Go viewed the two personalities as sharing a singular objective: Do Ra-mi acts as a defense mechanism for Mu-hee. She interpreted Mu-hee as a character burdened by anxiety who speaks indirectly to avoid vulnerability, whereas Do Ra-mi serves as a direct protector.

She described playing the role of Dorami as a significant turning point in her career, noting that the production environment encouraged greater artistic freedom and improvisation. She credited the collaborative atmosphere on set and her co-star's responsiveness with allowing her to expand her approach to performance.

The production was physically demanding, involving over 100 outfits, which averaged roughly ten per episode. Reflecting on the logistical scale, which spanned locations in Japan, Canada, and Italy, Go expressed gratitude for her stylist team effort. Given that much of the wardrobe consisted of high-end sponsor pieces, Go frequently opted to wear her own clothes during physically taxing scenes to prevent damage to the costumes.

== Themes and analysis ==
Sejong University visiting professor Son Chi-yeok noted that the character setup of Cha Mu-hee adheres to the Hong Sisters' signature style. In the Hong Sisters' universe, seemingly perfect characters are suspended between the "past and present" or "reality and fiction," and they only achieve personal growth by clashing with their opposites. For Mu-hee, that opposite is Joo Ho-jin. Son argued that this relationship is further complicated by Do Ra-mi, a manifestation of Mu-hee's subconscious. Acting as a vessel for her past trauma, Do Ra-mi catalyzes her development, transforming her immaturity into honesty and her awkwardness into boldness.

Kang So-jeong, an editor at Art Insight, provided a philosophical analysis of the character, breaking down how Cha Mu-hee's childhood trauma led her to perceive herself as "unlovable" and to doubt that affection would last. She emphasizes that Mu-hee's retreat from love not as simple avoidance, but as a defensive mechanism rooted in deep-seated anxiety and a fear of inevitable hurt. She subconsciously uses her alter ego, Dora-mi, to express the desires and emotions she cannot voice herself. Through Do Ra-mi, these suppressed feelings finally reach Ho-jin, bridging the gap that Mu-hee's own language could not cross.

누가 다정하면 죽을 것 같았다

Nuga dajeonghamyeon jugeul geot gatatda

I felt like I would die if someone were kind to me

— Kim Kyung-mi, a line from the poem Dajeongi Nareul (Note: Kim Kyung-mi's poem Dajeongi Nareul (다정이 나를; 'Kindness Kills Me') was first published in her poetry collection Gotongeul dallaeneun sunseo (고통을 달래는 순서; 'The Order of Soothing Pain') in 2009.)

Professor Choi Yu-kyung highlighted the inclusion of a poem by Kim Kyung-mi titled Dajeongi Nareul (다정이 나를; 'Kindness Kills Me') in the series. She noted that the poem helped to frame the relationship dynamics between Mu-hee and Ho-jin. Choi argues that Mu-hee, who believes she cannot be loved, is terrified of Ho-jin's kindness. His kindness shakes her and forces her to confront her trauma."

Oh Hye-na from Health Care Journal argued that the fact that Mu-hee's ability to see Do Ra-mi closer to a psychotic experience where thoughts and emotions are projected onto reality rather than a separation of identity. Heo Gyu-hyeong, Chief Director of the Yonsei Sansup Mental Health Clinic, documented a discussion with fellow psychiatrists Kim Ji-yong and Oh Dong-hoon that reached a similar conclusion: while navigating Mu-hee's dual personality, Ho-jin functions as someone who connects her "scattered heart" by decoding the emotions behind Do Ra-mi's words. They argued that "true interpretation" in the drama lies in accepting all facets of a person rather than dismissing them.

Gong Na-ri of The Media & Arts Culture argued that as a top star, Mu-hee developed the alter ego Do Ra-mi to cope with a debilitating fear that her public persona would destroy her true self. She noted that although the resulting dissociative memory gaps may seem extreme, they illustrate how overwhelming anxiety can lead to personality fragmentation. Gong further stated that Do Ra-mi functioned as both a protective mechanism and a threatening shadow, while Ho-jin's presence acted as a psychological mirror, turning their romance into a clinical healing process that integrated Mu-hee's fragmented self.

== Reception and impact ==
=== Public response ===
Netflix reported that the series reached the top 10 in 60 countries and topped the global non-English chart for two consecutive weeks following its premiere. The series remained in the top 10 for five weeks, accumulating over 271 million viewing hours and 20.6 million views during its first seven weeks. On July 17, 2026, according to Netflix engagement report for the first half of 2026, the series ranked 19th globally, with 28.6 million views and 377.7 million hours viewed.

Go's performance contributed to this success, as evidenced by Big data analytics firm Good Data Corporation, which ranked her first in cast buzzworthiness for three consecutive weeks in January, while the series also ranked first in the integrated TV-OTT drama category during that same period. Go Kim was nominated for the Best OTT Actress and Popularity Award in the K-drama actress category at the year-end FUNdex Award organized by the same firm.

According to the Korean Advertising Association's Journal (Spring 2026 edition), Go ranked first in Sometrend Analysis Center's January 2026 performer buzz-worthiness ranking. Go's personal social media following surpassed ten million users, a milestone that parallels her character Cha Mu-hee's own journey to global stardom in the series.

=== Critical reception ===
Reviewers shared similar praise for Go and Kim's chemistry: Keller of Decider called it "undeniable," Suwitcha of Bangkok Post called it "fantastic," Almeida of O Tempo referred to it as "magnetic," and Agarwal from Hello Magazine called it "easy breezy romantic chemistry." Nadkarni of Mashable India said that "it was so beautiful that you unknowingly fall in love with everything the show has to offer." Park Jin-young of Joy News24 commented that the on-screen chemistry between Kim and Go served as the show's main saving grace despite its narrative flaws.

In her piece for Vogue Singapore, Nurul Firdousee praised the visuals of Go and highlighted Mu-hee's wardrobe, noting how her style transitions from a modest girl-next-door aesthetic to a look that exudes complete star power. Charisma Shetty included Cha Mu-hee as one of Teen Vogue's "7 Most Stylish K-Drama Characters."

Writing for JoongAng Ilbo, cultural columnist Yang Seong-hee praised Go's "superb portrayal of a dual role," stating that her character is "lovable." Gong Na-ri, an editor for Munhwa Journal Mac, wrote that Go Yoon-jung poignantly portrayed a collapsing ego, shifting between the anxious top star Mu-hee and the uncontrollable Do Ra-mi, using an empty gaze following her character's memory loss to express a deep psychological abyss.

Driven by her performance in Can This Love Be Translated?, Go received several award nods from the Asia Star Entertainer Awards (ASEA 2026) in Japan, including Fan Choice Couple nomination alongside co-star Kim. She ultimately took home two trophies: Best Character (Female) and Best OTT Artist. Further recognition followed with Best Actress nomination at the 2026 Blue Dragon Series Awards, where she won Popularity Award for Actress and Global Icon Award. She also receive nominations for Best Actress in International Competition and Outstanding Asian Star at the 2026 Seoul International Drama Awards.

To celebrate its 22nd anniversary, Joy News24 surveyed 142 industry professionals in October 2026. Kim and Go placed second in the poll for Best Drama Couple of 2026, receiving 24 votes. Go earned three votes for K-Drama Actor of the Year and the series received one vote for Best Drama of the Year.

== Impact ==
=== Cultural impact ===
Cha Moo-hee's "L'HAS Classic Suede Bomber Jacket" sparked a surge of inquiries and soon sold out. Styled with a one-piece dress, the look was both feminine and polished through layering. The outfit became a trend, and the jacket was dubbed a sonminsutem (손민수템). (Note: It's a slang derives from the Cheese in the Trap character Son Min-su, who obsessively mimics others. Originally pejorative, the term is now used colloquially in fandom to describe purchasing trending products used by idols, known as the neologism Sonminsutem (손민수템), a combination of Son Min-su and item.)

Women Sense reported the rise of "poet core," highlighting how the show's inclusion of Kim Kyung-mi's poem triggered a surge of pre-order demand that placed her poetry collection, The Order of the Soothing Pain (2009), onto the bestseller list.

The originsal soundtract "Draydream" by Wendy appeared in the Seoul World Fireworks Festival, held on September 5, 2026, at Yeouido Hangang Park as part of Netflix Korea's 10th anniversary celebration. Manhwa artist Namon drew specially commisioned artwork of Ho-jin and Mu-hee for Netflix Korea's 10th Anniversary. The artwork was displayed in the "Netflix Janchi" fan festival on October 24 to 25, 2026, and also printed on the official collaboration merchandise, such as GS21 transportation cards and Musinsa T-shirts.

=== Tourism ===
Travel Alberta and Destination Canada have partnered with Netflix to launch a strategic set-jetting campaign showcasing Alberta by leveraging Ho-jin and Mu-hee's on-screen journey. To drive travel to the region, the tourism boards published official filming location guides featuring the couple in their official websites, while Netflix Canada mapped out the show's southern Alberta settings on its "Netflix In Your Neighbourhood" platform. This tourism promotion is further amplified by marketing collaborations with major airlines, WestJet and Air Canada.

Quarry Lake, Canmore, Canada, was the filming location of Ho-jin and Mu-hee's first kiss.

The campaign delivered measurable results. By February 15, South Korean travel platform Tripbtoz reported that the destinations' accommodation reservations had doubled, with demand centering on Banff and Canmore. On February 18, Hana Tour noted increased interest in the Canadian Rockies, identifying Quarry Lake in Canmore as a frequently requested site. In May, Mark Ham, executive director of Alberta Film Commissions and Cultural Industries, reported over 23,500 views for Travel Alberta's campaign materials, while partners estimated 3,316 bookings generating approximately CA$15 million in economic value. By July, local artist Jason Carter noted a surge in visitors to Quarry Lake which also increased foot traffic to his nearby art gallery.

Due to heightened interest, South Korean travel agencies also introduced specialized tour packages not only to Canada, but also to Japan and Italy. In March 2026 Trip.com reported that interest in Kamakura and Enoshima, the couple's first meeting spots, has increased by 60%, including a 55% jump in hotel searches, a 66% rise in Enoden train bookings, and a 64% increase in local tour reservations. This influx led to overtourism near the featured railway crossing. In response, local authorities installed multilingual signage in late March to protect private properties. In June, Blue House Senior Spokesperson Kang Yoo-jung mentioned in an MBC Radio interview that the series contributes to a significant increase in tourism in the small Tuscan town of Montalcino. Back in April, Italian media also reported similar rises in visitor numbers in Civita di Bagnoregio, Lazio.
