= Choi Woo-sung =

South Korean actor

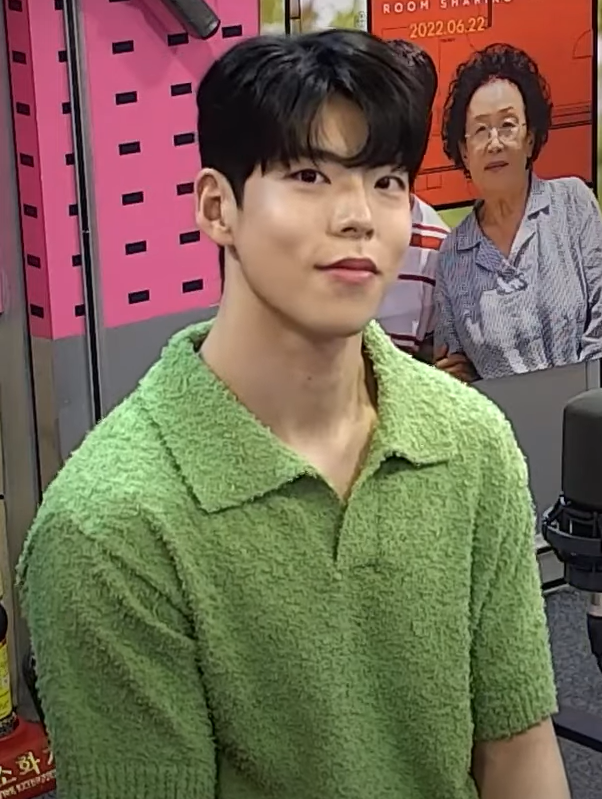
- Choi in June 2022
- Born: Choi Woo-sung; May 21, 1997 (age 29); Goyang, Gyeonggi-do, South Korea
- Occupation: Actor
- Years active: 2018–present
- Agent: AM Entertainment

Korean name
- Hangul: 최우성
- RR: Choe Useong
- MR: Ch'oe Usŏng

Choi Woo-sung (Korean: 최우성; born May 21, 1997) is a South Korean actor. He rose to prominence in 2022 for his breakthrough role as Ji-woong in director Lee Soon-sung's film Room Sharing, a performance that earned him the Best New Actor Award at the 42nd Golden Cinematography Awards. He is also known for his role as Cho Kyung-hwan in the MBC TV drama Chief Detective 1958 (2024).

== Career ==
=== Beginning ===
Choi Woo-sung debuted in 2019 with JTBC's At Eighteen. Since then, he has appeared as supporting roles in several dramas, including MBC's Welcome 2 Life, tvN's It's Okay to Not Be Okay, KBS2's Sell Your Haunted House, tvN's My Roommate Is a Gumiho, and tvN's Melancholia.

=== Breakthrough ===
In 2022, Choi landed his first leading role in film in director Lee Soon-sung's Room Sharing, acting alongside veteran actress Na Moon-hee. Choi portrayed Ji-woong, a college student from humble beginnings who struggles with part-time jobs, but who always has a bright personality and spreads positive influence to those around him. He received favorable reviews his chemistry with actress Na Moon-hee and winning the Best New Actor Award at the 42nd Golden Cinematography Awards.

Choi landed his first leading role in MBC's Chief Detective 1958, prequel of the Chief of Investigation. The story follows detective Park Young-han (Lee Je-hoon) and his team as they fight corruption and aim to be true public servants. Choi acted as Jo Kyung-hwan, the "bear-armed" detective, part of Park Young-han's team. To prepare for the role, Choi underwent action training and gained 25 kilograms. Aired on MBC TV in 2024, the series was a success, concluding with a 10.6% nationwide viewership.

In June 2024, Choi joined the cast of the Netflix romantic comedy series Can This Love Be Translated? as Kim Yong-u, the manager of top actress Cha Mu-hee (Go Youn-jung). The romantic comedy, which also stars Kim Seon-ho as interpreter Joo Ho-jin, finished filming in February 2025. It was released on Netflix on January 16, 2026.

== Filmography ==
=== Film ===
Year	Title	Role	Notes	Ref.
2021	Double Patty	Gangster	Bit part	
2022	Room Sharing	Han Ji-woong		

=== Television series ===
Year	Title	Role	Notes	Ref.
2019	Touch Your Heart	Waiter	Extra; episode 16	
2019	At Eighteen	Im Geon-hyuk	Guest role; episode 3-5	
2019	Welcome 2 Life	Oh Young-sik	Guest role; episode 1, 16	
2020	The King: Eternal Monarch	Kim Ki-won		
2020	It's Okay to Not Be Okay	Oh Cha-yong		
2021	She Would Never Know	Ko Myeong-jin		
2021	Sell Your Haunted House	Hyeong-sik	Guest role; episode 1–2, 9	
2021	My Roommate Is a Gumiho	Lee Dan		
2021	Police University	Yoon Seung-beom	Guest role; episode 1–2, 16	
2021	Melancholia	Jang Gyu-young		
2022	O'PENing - XX+XY	Bang Woo-ram	One-act drama	
2024	Chief Detective 1958	Cho Kyung-hwan		
2025	I Am a Running Mate	Yang Won-dae		
2026	Can This Love Be Translated?	Kim Yong-u		
2026	A Bona Fide Killer	Beom Seong-hoon		

=== Web series ===
Year	Title	Role	Notes	Ref.
2018	Best Teamwork	Choi Jun-ho		
2019	Triple Fling	Kim Tae-yoon	Season 2	

== Awards and nominations ==
Name of the award ceremony, year presented, category, nominee of the award, and the result of the nomination
Award ceremony	Year	Category	Nominee / Work	Result	Ref.
Golden Cinematography Awards	2022	Best New Actor	Room Sharing	Won	
