= O Tempo =

Brazilian newspaper

- Type: Daily newspaper
- Format: Berliner
- Founder: Vittorio Medioli
- President: Laura Medioli
- Founded: 1996
- Language: Portuguese
- Headquarters: Contagem, Minas Gerais, Brazil
- Country: Brazil
- Sister newspapers: Super Notícia
- Website: otempo.com.br

O Tempo is a Brazilian newspaper based in Contagem, in the Greater Belo Horizonte, state of Minas Gerais. The newspaper was created in 1996 by the Italian businessman and politician, who became a naturalized Brazilian Vittorio Medioli and is owned by Grupo SADA, through its publisher, Sempre Editora, which also controls the tabloid Super Notícia and a radio station, Rádio Super. O Tempo is the largest newspaper in Minas Gerais and one of the largest in Brazil.
