= 5th Blue Dragon Series Awards =

2026 South Korean television awards ceremony

- Official poster
- Awarded for: Excellence in OTT television
- Date: July 31, 2026
- Site: Paradise City, Incheon
- Hosted by: Jun Hyun-moo; Lim Yoona
- Organised by: Sports Chosun

Highlights
- Most wins: The Legend of Kitchen Soldier (3)
- Most nominations: The Scarecrow (6)
- Blue Dragon's Choice (Grand Prize): Kim Go-eun
- Website: bsa.blueaward.co.kr/series/

Television/radio coverage
- Network: KBS2
- Viewership: Ratings: 3.1%; Viewership: 711,000

The 5th edition of the Blue Dragon Series Awards ceremony, organised by Sports Chosun was held on July 31, 2026, at Paradise City, Incheon, at 20:30 KST. It was hosted by Jun Hyun-moo and Lim Yoona and broadcast live through KBS2.

The nominees were announced on July 1, 2026. The series produced and invested in by over-the-top (OTT) media platforms, released from June 1, 2025, to May 31, 2026, were eligible for nominations.

== Winners and nominees ==
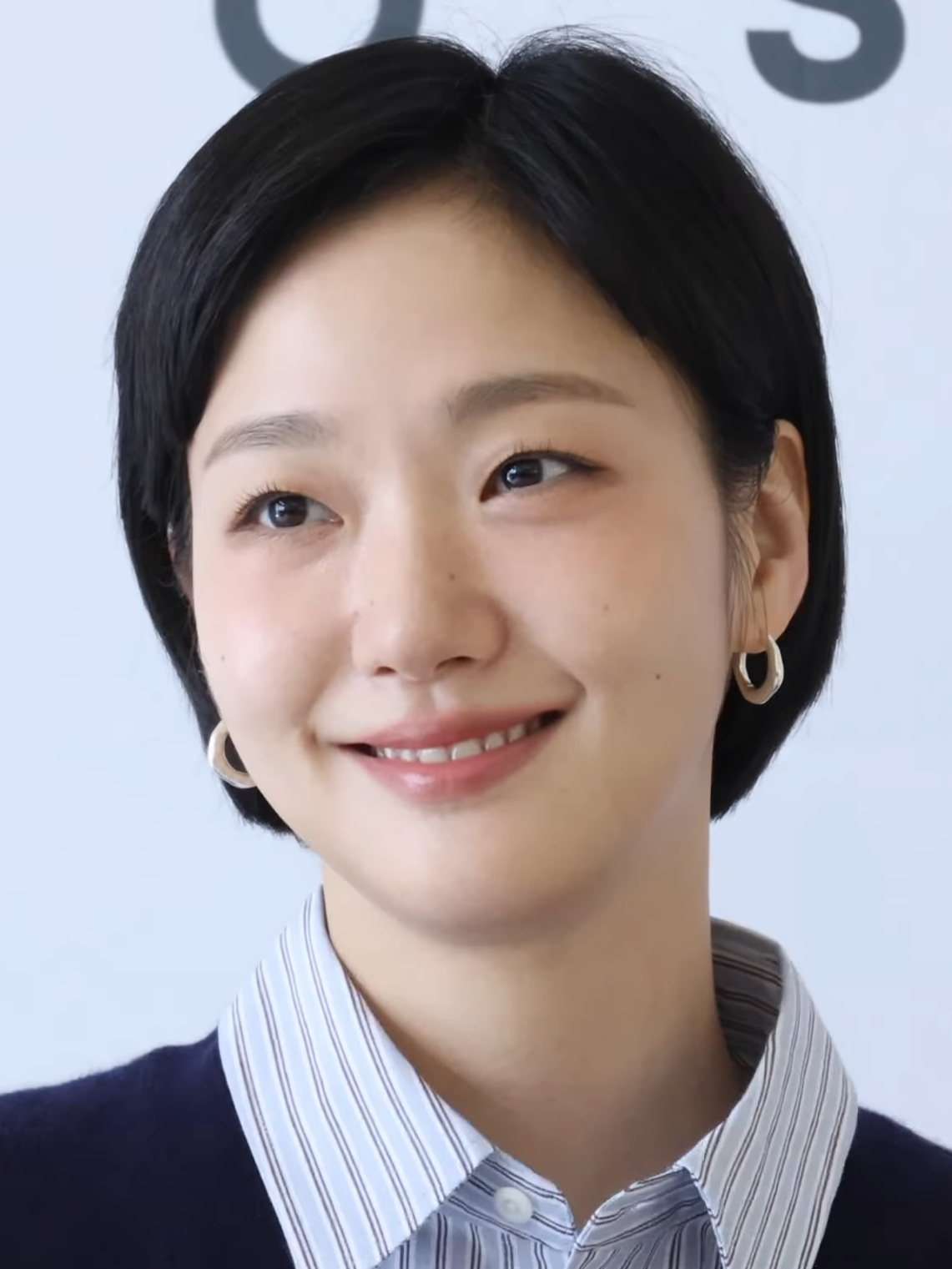
Kim Go-eun, Blue Dragon's Choice (Grand Prize) winner

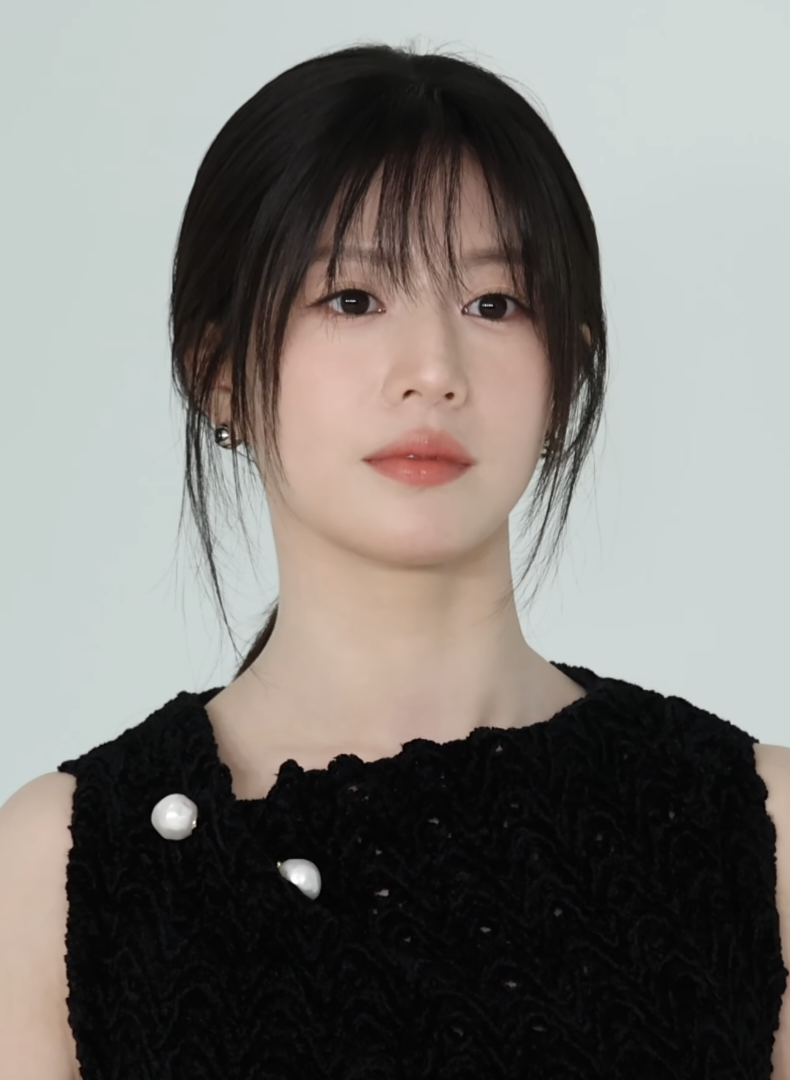
Go Youn-jung, Popular Star and Global Icon Awards winner

Winners are listed first and emphasized in bold.

**Blue Dragon's Choice (Grand Prize)**
**Kim Go-eun – You and Everything Else**
**Best Drama**	**Best Entertainment Program**
**The Legend of Kitchen Soldier**; Made in Korea; Yumi's Cells – Season 3; You and Everything Else; The Scarecrow	**Better Late than Single**; Screwballs – Season 4; Jae Seok's B&B Rules!; The White Collars – Season 2; Culinary Class Wars – Season 2
**Best Actor**	**Best Actress**
**Park Hae-soo – The Scarecrow**; Kim Seon-ho – Can This Love Be Translated?; Kim Woo-bin – Genie, Make a Wish; Park Ji-hoon – The Legend of Kitchen Soldier; Hyun Bin – Made in Korea	**Shin Hae-sun – The Art of Sarah**; Go Youn-jung – Can This Love Be Translated?; Kim Go-eun – You and Everything Else; Park Bo-young – Gold Land; Park Ji-hyun – You and Everything Else
**Best Supporting Actor**	**Best Supporting Actress**
**Yoon Kyung-ho – The Legend of Kitchen Soldier**; Lee Kwang-soo – Gold Land; Lee Sang-yi – The Legend of Kitchen Soldier; Jung Moon-sung – The Scarecrow; Jin Seon-kyu – Aema	**Park Bo-kyung – The Art of Sarah**; Kwak Sun-young – The Scarecrow; Moon Jung-hee – Gold Land; Seo Eun-soo – Made in Korea; Im Soo-jung – Low Life
**Best New Actor**	**Best New Actress**
**Kim Jae-won – Yumi's Cells – Season 3**; Kim Jin-wook – Low Life; Baek Sun-ho – If Wishes Could Kill; Song Geon-hee – The Scarecrow; Lee Hong-nae – The Legend of Kitchen Soldier	**Jeon So-young – If Wishes Could Kill**; Kim Min – Low Life; Bang Hyo-rin – Aema; Seo Ji-hye – The Scarecrow; Arin – S Line
**Best Male Entertainer**	**Best Female Entertainer**
**Kim Won-hun – Saturday Night Live Korea – Season 8** (Top Excellence Award); **Joo Woo-jae – Screwballs – Season 4** (Excellence Award); Shin Dong-yup – Saturday Night Live Korea – Season 8; Yu Jae-seok – Jae Seok's B&B Rules!; Lee Kwang-soo – Jae Seok's B&B Rules!	**Kim Sook – Screwballs – Season 4** (Top Excellence Award); **Jung Yi-rang – Dabang Sisters** (Excellence Award); Lee Soo-ji – Saturday Night Live Korea – Season 8; Lee Eun-ji – Better Late than Single; Ji Ye-eun – Jae Seok's B&B Rules!
**Best New Male Entertainer**	**Best New Female Entertainer**
**Kim Kyu-won – Saturday Night Live Korea – Season 8**; Kim Seon-ho – Bonjour Bakery; Byeon Woo-seok – Jae Seok's B&B Rules!; Car, the Garden – Better Late than Single; Hu Deok-juk – Culinary Class Wars – Season 2	**Yoon – The White Collars – Season 2**; Kim Si-hyeon – Culinary Class Wars – Season 2; Kim Ye-won – Exchange – Season 4; Ahn Joo-mi – Saturday Night Live Korea – Season 8; Choi Mina Sue – Single's Inferno – Season 5
**Popular Star Awards**	**OST Popularity Award**
**Go Youn-jung**; **Byeon Woo-seok**; **Yoo Jae-suk**; **Lee Soo-ji**	**An Yu-jin – "Sad Saltiness" (from The Legend of Kitchen Soldier)**
**Go Youn-jung**; **Byeon Woo-seok**; **Yoo Jae-suk**; **Lee Soo-ji**	**Global Icon Award with Lavien Cosmetic**
**Go Youn-jung**; **Byeon Woo-seok**; **Yoo Jae-suk**; **Lee Soo-ji**	**Go Youn-jung**

=== Programs with multiple nominations ===
The following television programs received multiple nominations:

Nominations	Television programs
6	The Scarecrow
5	Jae Seok's B&B Rules!
5	Saturday Night Live Korea – Season 8
5	The Legend of Kitchen Soldier
3	Better Late than Single
3	Culinary Class Wars – Season 2
3	Gold Land
3	Low Life
3	Made in Korea
3	Screwballs – Season 4
3	You and Everything Else
2	Aema
2	Can This Love Be Translated?
2	If Wishes Could Kill
2	The Art of Sarah
2	The White Collars – Season 2
2	Yumi's Cells – Season 3

=== Programs with multiple wins ===
The following television programs received multiple nominations:

Nominations	Television programs
3	The Legend of Kitchen Soldier
2	Screwballs – Season 4
2	Saturday Night Live Korea – Season 8
2	The Art of Sarah

== Performers ==
Name(s)	Performed	Ref.
Kim Min-ha	"That's Life"	
MigakBoys; Lee Sang-yi	"My Flavor"	
Yena	"Nemonemo" "Catch Catch"	
Tiger JK	"Angel" (with Lee Eun-ji) "Good Life" (with Mimi) "Monster" (with Mimi)	
