= Jeon So-young =

South Korean actress (born 2002)

- Jeon in October 2026
- Born: March 27, 2002 (age 24); Seoul, South Korea
- Education: Jinmyeong Girls' High School
- Alma mater: Seoul Institute of the Arts
- Occupation: Actress
- Years active: 2025–present
- Agent: BH Entertainment

Korean name
- Hangul: 전소영
- RR: Jeon Soyeong
- MR: Chŏn Soyŏng
- Website: Official website

Jeon So-young (Korean: 전소영; born March 27, 2002) is a South Korean actress. She made her debut in the television series Kick Kick Kick Kick (2025).

== Life and career ==
Jeon So-young was born on March 27, 2002 in Seoul, South Korea. She is currently attending Seoul Institute of the Arts, School of Performing Arts.

On August 23, 2024, Jeon signed an exclusive contract with BH Entertainment, marking the beginning of her on-screen acting career.

== Filmography ==
=== Film ===
Key
†	Denotes films that have not yet been released

Year	Title	Role	Notes	Ref.
2026	The Table: Day and Night	Na-kyung	Opening film of BIFF	

=== Television series ===
Key
†	Denotes television productions that have not yet been released

Year	Title	Role	Notes	Ref.
2025	Kick Kick Kick Kick	Ga Joo-ha		
2025	Melo Movie	Han-sol		
2025	Crushology 101	Han Yeo-reum		
2025	Beyond the Bar	Lee Seo-young		
2025	My Youth	Sung Je-yeon (teen)		
2026	Honour	Han Min-seo		
2026	If Wishes Could Kill	Yoo Se-ah		
2026	Yumi's Cells	Hwang Jenny	Season 3	
2026	The Legend of Kitchen Soldier	Jung Min-ah		
TBA	Study Group †	Jang Min-hee	Season 2	

=== Music video appearances ===
Year	Title	Artist(s)	Ref.
2024	"Everything" (종호)	Ateez	

== Awards and nominations ==
Name of the award ceremony, year presented, category, nominee of the award, and the result of the nomination
Award ceremony	Year	Category	Nominee / Work	Result	Ref.
Baeksang Arts Awards	2026	Best New Actress – Television	Honour	Nominated	
Blue Dragon Series Awards	2026	Best New Actress	If Wishes Could Kill	Won	
Icon Awards	2026	Rising Icon	Jeon So-young	Won	
Korea Drama Awards	2026	Best New Actress	If Wishes Could Kill & The Legend of Kitchen Soldier	Won	
Marie Claire Asia Star Awards	2026	Rising Star Award	Jeon So-young	Won	
