= Baek Sun-ho =

South Korean actor (born 2003)

- Born: Lee Sun-ho; July 18, 2003 (age 23); Seoul, South Korea
- Education: Kyunggi High School
- Occupation: Actor
- Years active: 2023–present
- Agent: C-JeS Studios

Korean name
- Hangul: 이선호
- RR: I Seonho
- MR: I Sŏnho

Stage name
- Hangul: 백선호
- RR: Baek Seonho
- MR: Paek Sŏnho
- Website: Official website

Lee Sun-ho (Korean: 이선호; born July 18, 2003), known professionally as Baek Sun-ho (백선호), is a South Korean actor.

== Career ==
Baek Sun-ho was a member of C-JeS Studios' pre-debut boy group, M.I.C (now known as WHIB). In July 2023, he departed from the group and pursued acting.

Baek made his acting debut in television series Between Him and Her (2023).

== Personal life ==
=== Military service ===
On November 30, 2025, Baek announced his enlistment for mandatory military service as an active-duty soldier.

== Filmography ==
=== Television series ===
Year	Title	Role	Notes	Ref.
2023–2024	Between Him and Her	Jang Eun-woo		
2024	Dongjae, the Good or the Bastard	Sung Si-woon		
2024	O'PENing: Million Dollar Baby	Sung Seo-jun		
2025	Kick Kick Kick Kick	Lee Mark		
2025	Dear X	Coffee shop customer	Cameo (Ep. 3)	
2026	If Wishes Could Kill	Kim Geon-woo		

== Awards and nominations ==
Name of the award ceremony, year presented, category, nominee of the award, and the result of the nomination
Award ceremony	Year	Category	Nominee / Work	Result	Ref.
Blue Dragon Series Awards	2026	Best New Actor	If Wishes Could Kill	Nominated	
