= You and Everything Else =

2025 South Korean television series

- Promotional poster
- Hangul: 은중과 상연
- Lit.: Eun-jung and Sang-yeon
- RR: Eunjunggwa Sangyeon
- MR: Ŭnjunggwa Sangyŏn
- Genre: Romance; Coming-of-age
- Written by: Song Hye-jin
- Directed by: Jo Young-min
- Starring: Kim Go-eun; Park Ji-hyun
- Music by: Jay Kim
- Opening theme: "Reason" by Choi Yu-ree
- Country of origin: South Korea
- Original language: Korean
- No. of episodes: 15

Production
- Executive producers: Jang Se-jeong; Choi Kyung-sook; Kim Min-ji (CP)
- Producers: Bae Sun-hye; Woo Jung-min
- Cinematography: Uhm Sung-tak; Shin Jae-hyun; Yoo Jae-won
- Editors: Lee Sang-rok; Yeo Tae-hyun
- Production company: Kakao Entertainment

Original release
- Network: Netflix
- Release: September 12, 2025

You and Everything Else (Korean: 은중과 상연) is a 2025 South Korean romance coming-of-age television series written by Song Hye-jin, directed by Jo Young-min, and starring Kim Go-eun and Park Ji-hyun. The series follows two lifelong friends as they confront envy, rivalry, and reconciliation when one of them faces a terminal illness. It was released on Netflix on September 12, 2025.

== Synopsis ==
Ryu Eun‑jung and Cheon Sang‑yeon, two women whose lifelong friendship is shaped by admiration, envy, and misunderstanding. Their bond evolves from their teenage years into adulthood, as Eun‑jung becomes a television writer and Sang‑yeon a successful film producer. At age 42, Sang‑yeon is diagnosed with terminal cancer and asks Eun‑jung to stay by her side, prompting both to confront their shared past, regrets, and the complex emotions that have always underpinned their relationship.

== Cast and characters ==
=== Main ===
- Kim Go-eun as Ryu Eun-jung
  - Do Young-seo as young Ryu Eun-jung

A television drama writer. She met the privileged Cheon Sang-yeon in elementary school, which stirred feelings of admiration and jealousy deep within her. After several separations and reunions, they meet again in their early forties, when Sang-yeon, suffering from terminal cancer, asks Eun-jung to accompany her for the rest of her life.

- Park Ji-hyun as Cheon Sang-yeon
  - Park Seo-kyung as young Cheon Sang-yeon

A film producer, Eun-jung's best friend and rival in life. Raised in a wealthy family, she has been admired for her talents since childhood.

- Kim Gun-woo as Kim Sang-hak

Eun-jung's boyfriend, and a senior from the university photography club that Eun-jung and Sang-yeon were part of.

=== Supporting ===
- Jang Hye-jin as Jang Soon-young, Eun-jung's mother.
- Seo Jung-yeon as Yoon Hyun-sook, Sang-yeon's mother.
- Yoon Se-woong as Sang-yeon's father.
- Kim Jae-won as Cheon Sang-hak, Sang-yeon's older brother.
  - Moon Woo-jin as young Cheon Sang-hak
- Joo Min-kyung as Choi Kyoung
- Lee Sang-yoon as Gyeong Seung-ju, a director who worked with Eun-jung, Sang-yeon, and Kim Sang-hak.
- Kwak Min-gyu as director Joo Do-hyang.
- Gong Min-jung as Oh Hee-jin
- Cha Hak-yeon as Song Yu-chan
- Jo Yi-hyun as Son Jun-ho, Eun-jung and Sang-yeon's classmate.

=== Special appearances ===
- Lee Jong-won as Lee Seung-jae
- Jo Han-chul

== Production ==
The series was developed under the working title Two Women. Filming began in October 2023, wrapped up domestic shooting in South Korea at the end of May 2024, and moved to Switzerland in early June for location filming, and concluded later that month.

== Original soundtrack ==
The soundtrack album was released on September 12, 2025, together with the release of the series.

You and Everything Else (Soundtrack from the Netflix Series)

Soundtrack album by Various artists
- Released: September 12, 2025
- Length: 37:26
- Languages: Korean; English
- Label: Netflix

Track listing
No.	Title	Lyrics	Music	Artist	Length
1.	"Reason"	Kim Jang-woo; Eo Young-soo	Kim Jang-woo; Eo Young-soo; Chang Kang	Choi Yu-ree	2:57
2.	"Rainbow"	Kim Jang-woo; Eo Young-soo	Kim Jang-woo; Eo Young-soo; Chang Kang	J Rabbit	3:25
3.	"Home"	Kim Jang-woo; Eo Young-soo	Kim Jang-woo; Eo Young-soo; Chang Kang	Paul Kim	3:05
4.	"Neo Eui Hyang Gi" (너의 향기)	Kim Jang-woo; Eo Young-soo	Kim Jang-woo; Eo Young-soo; Chang Kang	So Soo Bin	3:54
5.	"Hope"	Kim Jang-woo; Eo Young-soo	Kim Jang-woo; Eo Young-soo; Chang Kang	Kwon Jin-ah	3:45
6.	"Star"	Kim Jang-woo; Eo Young-soo	Kim Jang-woo; Eo Young-soo; Chang Kang	Hajin	3:01
7.	"Weird Mirror"	Kim Jang-woo; ET; Kim Si-hyuk	Kim Jang-woo; Kim Si-hyuk	Seori	2:53
8.	"You"	Kim Jang-woo; Eo Young-soo	Kim Jang-woo; Eo Young-soo; Chang Kang	Hajin	3:16
9.	"Color Palette"	Kim Jang-woo; Eo Young-soo	Kim Jang-woo; Eo Young-soo; Chang Kang	Seori	3:25
10.	"Blue Temperature"	Kim Jang-woo; Eo Young-soo	Kim Jang-woo; Eo Young-soo	Seori	4:10
11.	"Note and Pencil"	Kim Jang-woo; Eo Young-soo	Kim Jang-woo; Eo Young-soo	Seori	3:35
Total length:					37:26

== Release ==
You and Everything Else was released on Netflix on September 12, 2025.

== Accolades ==
Award ceremony	Year	Category	Nominee	Result	Ref.
APAN Star Awards	2025	Drama of the Year	You and Everything Else	Nominated	
APAN Star Awards	2025	Best Director	Jo Young-min	Nominated	
APAN Star Awards	2025	Best Screenwriter	Song Hye-jin	Nominated	
APAN Star Awards	2025	Top Excellence Award, Actress in a Miniseries	Kim Go-eun	Nominated	
APAN Star Awards	2025	Excellence Award, Actress in a Miniseries	Park Ji-hyun	Nominated	
Baeksang Arts Awards	2026	Best Drama	You and Everything Else	Won	
Baeksang Arts Awards	2026	Best Director	Jo Young-min	Nominated	
Baeksang Arts Awards	2026	Best Actress	Kim Go-eun	Nominated	
Baeksang Arts Awards	2026	Best Actress	Park Ji-hyun	Nominated	
Baeksang Arts Awards	2026	Best Supporting Actor	Kim Gun-woo	Nominated	
Baeksang Arts Awards	2026	Best Screenplay	Song Hye-jin	Won	
Baeksang Arts Awards	2026	Best Technical Achievement	Eom Seong-tak (Cinematography)	Nominated	
Korean Broadcasting Writers' Awards	2026	Writer Award (Drama Division)	Song Hye-jin	Won	
Blue Dragon Series Awards	2026	Best Drama	You and Everything Else	Nominated	
Blue Dragon Series Awards	2026	Blue Dragon's Choice (Grand Prize)	Kim Go-eun	Won	
Blue Dragon Series Awards	2026	Best Actress	Kim Go-eun	Nominated	
Blue Dragon Series Awards	2026	Best Actress	Park Ji-hyun	Nominated	
Global OTT Awards	2026	Best Creative	You and Everything Else	Won	
Global OTT Awards	2026	Best Writer	Song Hye-jin	Nominated	
Global OTT Awards	2026	Best Supporting Actor	Kim Gun-woo	Nominated	
Seoul International Drama Awards	2026	Best Mini-Series	You and Everything Else	Nominated	
Seoul International Drama Awards	2026	Best Actress	Kim Go-eun	Nominated	
Korea Drama Awards	2026	Best Drama	You and Everything Else	Nominated	
Korea Drama Awards	2026	Top Excellence Award, Actress	Kim Go-eun	Nominated	
Korea Drama Awards	2026	Excellence Award, Actress	Park Ji-hyun	Nominated	
International Emmy Awards	2026	Best Performance by an Actress	Park Ji-hyun	Pending	
