= Honour (South Korean TV series) =

2026 South Korean television series

- Promotional poster
- Hangul: 아너 : 그녀들의 법정
- Lit.: Honor: Their Courtroom
- RR: Aneo : geunyeodeurui beopjeong
- MR: Anŏ : kŭnyŏdŭrŭi pŏpchŏng
- Genre: Mystery; Legal; Thriller
- Based on: Heder by: Sofia Helin; Alexandra Rapaport; Julia Dufvenius; Anja Lundqvist
- Written by: Park Ga-yeon
- Directed by: Park Gun-ho
- Starring: Lee Na-young; Jung Eun-chae; Lee Chung-ah
- Music by: Movie Closer
- Opening theme: "Honour" by Kim Joon-seok
- Country of origin: South Korea
- Original language: Korean
- No. of episodes: 12

Production
- Running time: 60 minutes
- Production company: How Pictures

Original release
- Network: ENA; Genie TV
- Release: February 2 – March 10, 2026

Honour (Korean: 아너 : 그녀들의 법정) is a 2026 South Korean mystery legal thriller television series written by Park Ga-yeon, directed by Park Gun-ho, and starring Lee Na-young, Jung Eun-chae, and Lee Chung-ah. Based on Swedish television series Heder, it revolves around a 20-year-old secret that the three lawyer friends buried, which resurfaces and throws their lives into chaos. It aired on ENA from February 2, to March 10, 2026, every Monday and Tuesday at 22:00 (KST). It is also available for streaming on Genie TV and Coupang Play.

== Synopsis ==
Three lawyers, Yoon Ra-young, Kang Shin-jae, and Hwang Hyun-jin, have been inseparable for 20 years, bonding over their shared passion for justice as university students. They've since built a career at L&J Law Firm, specializing in defending women victims of crime. But a long-buried secret from their past threatens to upend their lives, forcing them to confront their deepest fears. United, they stand strong, their friendship and determination unbreakable as they fight back against the shadows of their past.

== Cast and characters ==
=== Main ===
- Lee Na-young as Yoon Ra-young

L&J's celebrity lawyer.

- Jung Eun-chae as Kang Shin-jae

The head lawyer at L&J.

- Lee Chung-ah as Hwang Hyun-jin

A fiery lawyer at L&J, wife of Koo Seon-gyu.

=== Supporting ===
- Yeon Woo-jin as Baek Tae-joo
- Seo Hyun-woo as Park Je-yeol

A criminal prosecutor.

- Choi Young-joon as Koo Seon-gyuHusband of Hwang Hyun-jin, a criminal unit detective.
- Jeon So-young as Han Min-seo
- Kim Mi-sook as Seong Tae-im
- Lee Hae-young as Kwon Joong-hyun
- Park Se-hyun as Joo Yoo-jeong
- Lee Chan-hyeong as Kang Eun-seok

== Production ==
=== Development ===
Produced under How Pictures, the series is directed by Park Gun-ho, who helmed Dongjae, the Good or the Bastard (2024), and the screenplay is written by Park Ga-yeon, who wrote Train (2020).

=== Casting ===
On March 26, 2025, Lee Na-young and Jung Eun-chae were reportedly positively considering. The next month, Kwak Sun-young was reportedly considering. Three months later, Lee Chung-ah replaced Kwak. On August 12, Seo Hyun-woo was cast as the male lead. By September 2, 2025, Lee Na-young, Jung Eun-chae, and Lee Chung-ah were confirmed to star.

=== Filming ===
Principal photography commenced in August 2025.

== Release ==
Honour premiered on ENA on February 2, 2026, and airs every Monday and Friday at 22:00 (KST). It is also available for streaming on Genie TV and Coupang Play.

== Viewership ==
Honour : South Korea viewers per episode (thousands)

Season	Episode number												Average
Season	1	2	3	4	5	6	7	8	9	10	11	12	Average
1	742	720	818	804	740	711	999	1025	1070	1004	1056	1129	902

Source: Audience measurement performed nationwide by Nielsen Korea.

Average TV viewership ratings
Ep.	Original broadcast date	Average audience share (Nielsen Korea)	
Ep.	Original broadcast date	Nationwide	Seoul
1	February 2, 2026	3.130% (2nd)	2.881% (2nd)
2	February 3, 2026	3.236% (2nd)	3.038% (2nd)
3	February 9, 2026	3.758% (2nd)	3.447% (2nd)
4	February 10, 2026	3.259% (2nd)	3.336% (2nd)
5	February 16, 2026	3.104% (2nd)	2.991% (2nd)
6	February 17, 2026	3.103% (2nd)	3.626% (2nd)
7	February 23, 2026	4.293% (1st)	4.220% (1st)
8	February 24, 2026	4.220% (1st)	3.956% (1st)
9	March 2, 2026	4.267% (2nd)	4.244% (2nd)
10	March 3, 2026	4.315% (2nd)	3.781% (2nd)
11	March 9, 2026	4.357% (1st)	4.092% (1st)
12	March 10, 2026	4.736% (1st)	4.914% (1st)
Average		3.815%	3.711%
In the table above, the blue numbers represent the lowest ratings and the red numbers represent the highest ratings.; This drama aired on a cable channel/pay TV which normally has a relatively smaller audience compared to free-to-air TV/public broadcasters (KBS, SBS, MBC, and EBS).

== Accolades ==
Award ceremony	Year	Category	Recipient(s)	Result	Ref.
Baeksang Arts Awards	2026	Best New Actress	Jeon So-young	Nominated	
