= The Art of Sarah =

2026 South Korean television series

- Promotional poster
- Hangul: 레이디 두아
- Lit.: Lady Doir
- RR: Reidi Dua
- MR: Reidi Tua
- Genre: Mystery; Thriller
- Written by: Chu Song-yeon
- Directed by: Kim Jin-min
- Starring: Shin Hye-sun; Lee Joon-hyuk
- Music by: Hwang Sang-jun
- Country of origin: South Korea
- Original language: Korean
- No. of episodes: 8

Production
- Executive producers: Park Joon-seo; Lee Kyung-sik; Song Kyung-soo (CP)
- Producers: Song Dam-yi; Kim Ji-hoon
- Cinematography: Joo Song-rim
- Editor: Nam Na-yeong
- Running time: 39–51 minutes
- Production company: SLL

Original release
- Network: Netflix
- Release: February 13, 2026

The Art of Sarah (Korean: 레이디 두아) is a 2026 South Korean mystery thriller television series written by Chu Song-yeon and directed by Kim Jin-min. The series focuses on Sarah Kim (Shin Hye-sun), a woman who constructed a fraudulent identity as a high-society luxury brand executive, and the investigation into her mysterious murder led by detective Park Mu-gyeong (Lee Joon-hyuk). Produced by SLL, it was released on Netflix on February 13, 2026 and received generally positive reviews from critics, who frequently highlighted the central performance of Shin Hye-sun and the series' stylistic execution.

== Synopsis ==
Sarah Kim, a woman who has created a false identity based on wealth, social status and whose life is thrown into confusion when a body believed to be hers is found in a sewer beneath Seoul's upscale district. Detective Park Mu-Gyeong investigates the case and discovers that Sarah has no clear personal records, leading him to uncover inconsistencies in her background and evidence that she has lived under multiple identities. As the investigation progresses, Sarah's constructed life begins to collapse, revealing the consequences of long-term deception and raising questions about identity, truth, and self-innovation.

== Cast and characters ==
=== Main ===
- Shin Hye-sun as Sarah Kim / Mok Ga-hui / Du-a / Kim Eun-jae
1. Sarah Kim, the regional head of Boudoir who becomes a victim of a murder case
2. Mok Ga-hui, a salesperson at Samwol Department Store
3. Du-a / Kim Eun-jae, a bar hostess who donates her kidney in exchange for 500 million won
- Lee Joon-hyuk as Park Mu-gyeong, the team leader of Violent Crimes Unit at Seoul Metropolitan Police Agency who investigates Sarah Kim's murder case

=== Supporting ===
- Park Bo-kyung as Jeong Yeo-jin, CEO of Nox who is befriended by Sarah
- Shin Hyun-seung as Hyeon Jae-hyeon, a rookie detective of Violent Crimes Unit at Seoul Metropolitan Police Agency
- Jung Da-bin as Woo Hyo-eun, a former salesperson who was scouted by Sarah and becomes a department store line sitter
- Yoon Ga-i as Yang Da-hye, Hyo-eun's friend
- Kim Jae-won as Kang Ji-hwon, an escort who falls in love with Eun-jae, and Chae-u's personal secretary
- Jung Jin-young as Hong Seong-shin, a loan shark businessman who was suffering from kidney failure
- Bae Jong-ok as Choi Chae-u, Chairwoman of Samwol Department Store
- Lee E-dam as Kim Mi-jeong, an illicit factory worker specializing in high-end counterfeits who served as the true designer behind the Boudoir products
- Kim Yong-ji as Shin So-ui, an actress
- Im Gi-hong as Min Byeong-kwan
- Lee Mi-do as Yeong-a (special appearance)
- Kong Jeong-hwan as Dong-rim, a businessman
- Kim Jong-tae as the Section Chief of Seoul Metropolitan Police Agency
- Yoon Tae-in as Detective Kim of Violent Crimes Team One at Seoul Metropolitan Police Agency
- Cho Da-hee as Detective Lee of Violent Crimes Unit at Seoul Metropolitan Police Agency
- Lee Hwa-jung as the team leader of Financial Crimes Unit at Seoul Metropolitan Police Agency
- Kim Tae-hoon as the team leader of Cyber Crimes Unit at Seoul Metropolitan Police Agency
- Lee Joo-yeon as Gemma, a bar hostess and influencer
- Jeon Su-ji as Kim Hong-mi
- Lee Eun-joo as the manager of Samwol Department Store
- Seo Ye-hwa as Seon-jeong, a salesperson at Samwol Department Store
- Son Soo-ah as the manager of Boudoir

== Episodes ==
No.	Title	Original release date
1	"Jane Doe"; Transliteration: "Mumyeongnyeo" (Korean: 무명녀)	February 13, 2026
Detective Park Mu-gyeong investigates the death of Sarah Kim, a businesswoman found with an unrecognizable face. As Mu-gyeong examines her background, he finds inconsistencies regarding her identity. He questions Jeong Yeo-jin, a wealthy acquaintance who describes their relationship. Yeo-jin claims she cared for Sarah despite her own social isolation and invested in Sarah's plan to launch "Boudoir", a European luxury brand, in the local market. However, flashbacks reveal a different dynamic, showing frequent arguments over failed investment returns. A luxury handbag Sarah gifted Yeo-jin is also discovered to be a counterfeit. While Yeo-jin initially identified the body at the morgue, Mu-gyeong later reviews surveillance footage showing Yeo-jin spitting on the corpse. The episode also introduces a past connection between Mu-gyeong and Sarah, where he offered her his tie while she was in distress. The investigation deepens as Mu-gyeong begins to doubt the official narrative of Sarah's life and the legitimacy of her business empire, setting the stage for a complex web of fraud and personal resentment among her inner circle.
2	"Sarah Kim"; Transliteration: "Sara Kim" (Korean: 사라킴)	February 13, 2026
Detective Park’s investigation reveals that Yeo-jin previously hired a local gangster to intimidate Sarah over her unpaid investment. The perpetrator tells police that he attempted to rob Sarah's boutique on Yeo-jin's orders, but Sarah trapped the men inside and filed criminal charges. This resulted in the gangster's imprisonment and forced Yeo-jin to sign an agreement dropping the investment dispute. The narrative introduces Woo Hyo-eun, a former Boudoir salesperson now working as a reseller after being blacklisted by Sarah. Hyo-eun recalls Sarah's business practices, such as destroying unsold inventory to maintain the brand's image. Hyo-eun and her friend Yang Da-hye began secretly investigating the authenticity of Boudoir's items before Sarah caught them and terminated Hyo-eun's employment. As Hyo-eun and Da-hye continue to look into Sarah's history, they uncover a lead pointing to a woman named Mok Ga-hui. Simultaneously, the police arrive at the same name, suggesting a previous identity used by the deceased. The episode ends with the two parallel investigations converging on Sarah's hidden past and her connection to the name Mok Ga-hui.
3	"Mok Ga-hui"; Transliteration: "Mok Gahui" (Korean: 목가희)	February 13, 2026
Mu-gyeong's team investigates Samwol Department Store, owned by Choi Chae-u, a client of Sarah. Though Chae-u is uncooperative, records link Sarah to Ga-hui, a former Samwol employee. Flashbacks show Ga-hui falling into significant debt after luxury goods disappeared during her shift. To repay the loss, she utilized employee-only sales to buy discounted items and resell them online for a profit. Her success led her to take private loans and use a colleague's identity to bypass purchasing restrictions. However, when stores began cracking down on the secondary market, her supply dried up, leaving her indebted to loan sharks. In a desperate move, Ga-hui stole a handbag from Samwol, triggered a fire alarm to escape, and left a suicide note before appearing to jump into a reservoir on CCTV. While the public believed she had died, Detective Park concludes the suicide was staged to escape her creditors. The police later discover a human skeleton in the reservoir, complicating the timeline of Ga-hui's disappearance and raising questions about whose remains were left behind while Ga-hui assumed the identity of Sarah Kim.
4	"Kim Eun-jae"; Transliteration: "Gim Eunjae" (Korean: 김은재)	February 13, 2026
The police identify Kang Ji-hwon as a person of interest. Ji-hwon explains he met Sarah when she used the name Kim Eun-jae, claiming to be the wife of loan shark Hong Seong-shin. Ji-hwon believed she was being abused due to marks on her hands and attempted to intervene, though Sarah protected Seong-shin. She provided Ji-hwon with financial support, but became angry when he suggested they live together. Ji-hwon eventually discovered her luxury brand used counterfeit goods and her backstory was manufactured. Seong-shin provides a different account, stating he entered a sham marriage with Sarah for 500 million won and a kidney donation. Though she initially tried to flee, Sarah eventually underwent the surgery. She left Seong-shin after taking a symbolic payment. As the police publicly detail her history of multiple identities, the woman known as Sarah Kim unexpectedly arrives at the station to meet Detective Park. This move shifts the investigation from a search for a missing person to a direct confrontation with the suspect, as Sarah prepares to defend her actions and the legitimacy of her current persona.
5	"Boudoir"; Transliteration: "Budua" (Korean: 부두아)	February 13, 2026
Following a public search notice, Sarah surrenders for interrogation. She argues her business is legal, having returned Yeo-jin's investment while maintaining a contract for future profits. She explains that "Made in England" labels are technically accurate because final assembly occurs there, despite using local components. Sarah also clarifies that she never explicitly claimed ties to European royalty, though she allowed those rumors to persist. During a joint interrogation, Yeo-jin retracts her previous hostile statements. Lacking evidence of fraud, the police are forced to release her. However, Mu-gyeong notices a discrepancy in her statement: she demonstrated knowledge of the unidentified body found at the start of the case. Mu-gyeong deduces that the victim was intentionally made to look like Sarah to facilitate a faked death. This suggests Sarah had prior knowledge of the victim's death or was involved in the murder. Based on this slip, Mu-gyeong arrests her on a murder charge, linking her directly to the unrecognizable corpse. The focus of the case shifts from financial impropriety to a capital crime as Mu-gyeong attempts to prove Sarah's involvement in the homicide.
6	"Unregistered Person"; Transliteration: "Mujeokja" (Korean: 무적자)	February 13, 2026
While Sarah faces murder charges, Mu-gyeong meets Chae-u for an off-the-record interview. Chae-u admits Sarah manipulated her by exploiting her interest in rare products and young men. Flashbacks show Sarah used Ji-hwon as a spy within Chae-u's office to remove a loyal employee. Chae-u also mentions a past incident where a different woman claiming to be Sarah Kim was detained at Samwol; Sarah insisted the woman be released without charges, a request Chae-u granted to protect her own reputation. Mu-gyeong's investigation confirms the existence of this second "Sarah", creating significant confusion regarding the suspect's identity. He struggles to reconcile which woman is the person in custody and which is the victim. The presence of multiple individuals using the same name suggests a systemic pattern of identity theft. As Park attempts to untangle these layers, he realizes that the woman in custody has been navigating a complex social hierarchy by assuming various personas. The investigation continues as Mu-gyeong tries to determine the true origins of the woman he has arrested and her relationship to the other claimants.
7	"Kim Mi-jeong"; Transliteration: "Gim Mijeong" (Korean: 김미정)	February 13, 2026
Mu-gyeong finds evidence of a woman operating as Sarah Kim, providing a motive for the murder of the "other" Sarah. He threatens to expose the fraudulent origins of the Boudoir brand, warning that the scandal would destroy the company. To save the brand, the woman in custody confesses. She identifies Kim Mi-jeong, a runaway and skilled counterfeit designer, as the creator of Boudoir's products. According to the confession, Mi-jeong worked in an illicit factory and began impersonating Sarah after seeing the brand's success. The rivalry peaked when Mi-jeong nearly exposed Sarah's secrets to Chae-u, leading to her dismissal. In response, Mi-jeong reported her colleagues to authorities to isolate Sarah. In a final twist, the woman in custody claims she is actually Kim Mi-jeong. She states that she murdered the original Sarah Kim to permanently take over her identity and the luxury brand. This confession clarifies the motive for the murder but leaves Mu-gyeong questioning the veracity of her story, as she effectively chooses a murder conviction over the destruction of the brand she worked to build.
8	"The Art of Sarah"; Transliteration: "Reidi Dua" (Korean: 레이디 두아)	February 13, 2026
Mu-gyeong theorizes that at a Boudoir event, Sarah was confronted by those she exploited. He suggests Chae-u and Yeo-jin reached a tense settlement with her, but the stress led Sarah to kill Mi-jeong during a provocation. Sarah counters this by formally adopting the Mi-jeong identity in court. She admits to a fatal struggle but claims she acted in self-defense while attempting to steal Sarah's life. Mu-gyeong tries to use DNA from a previous kidney transplant to verify her identity, but finds that Seong-shin destroyed the medical records. Without biological proof, the police are unable to confirm which woman is which. Sarah challenges Mu-gyeong to either release her as Sarah Kim or convict her as Kim Mi-jeong for Sarah's murder. The police eventually drop the fraud charges and conclude that the "real" Sarah Kim was the victim. The woman is convicted as Kim Mi-jeong, effectively sacrificing her legal identity to ensure the Boudoir brand survives under Yeo-jin and Chae-u's management. Mu-gyeong visits the prison for a final meeting, still seeking the truth about her actual identity.

== Production ==
=== Development ===
The series is produced by SLL, written by Chu Song-yeon, directed by Kim Jin-min and structured as an 8-episode mystery thriller series. Netflix began the production of the series in January 2025, with cinematographer Joo Sung-rim, as well as editor Nam Na-yeong and costume director Cho Sang-kyung. The director described the series as a "timely" look at human ambition, designed to prompt viewers to confront their own desires. While the narrative centers on the luxury industry, the production aimed to explore the "fundamental value" of identity rather than simple materialism.

=== Casting ===
Shin Hye-sun and Lee Joon-hyuk were cast in 2024 and confirmed their appearances in 2025, to lead the series. This project marks the first time the two actors have shared the screen since the 2017 crime thriller series Stranger. Following the confirmation of Shin and Lee, Kim Jae-won, Jung Da-bin, and Shin Hyun-seung joined the cast.

Director Kim emphasized that casting was the series' most crucial element, noting that Shin's ability to portray "countless faces" was essential for the character's multifaceted nature. Shin's preparation involved extensive styling, using a wide array of wigs, contact lenses, and makeup to distinguish Sarah Kim's various aliases. Lee was described as the "audience's surrogate", and he reportedly influenced the script's development by providing "sharp, precise questions" during the filming process to maintain the procedural's internal logic.

=== Filming ===
Principal photography began in January 2025 and wrapped up around late May of the same year. Filming locations included the upscale Cheongdam-dong district in Seoul to authentically depict the high-fashion industry. The actors cited a high level of "unspoken trust" on set, which Shin credited for the immediate "click" in their performance during complex scenes, such as the central interrogation sequences.

== Release ==
Netflix officially confirmed that The Art of Sarah is scheduled to be released on February 13, 2026. Along with the announcement, a teaser poster and trailer were unveiled. The poster depicts a grim crime scene with a luxury handbag obscuring a victim's face, symbolizing the show's themes of vanity and hidden identity.

== Reception ==
=== Critical response ===
Professional ratings
Aggregate scores
Source	Rating
Rotten Tomatoes	86%
Review scores
Source	Rating
But Why Tho?	6.5/10
The Review Geek	6.5/10
India Today	3.5/5 stars
South China Morning Post	3/5 stars
Digital Mafia Talkies	3/5 stars
Ready Steady Cut	2.5/5 stars

On the review aggregator website Rotten Tomatoes, 86% of 7 critics' reviews are positive, with an average rating of 6.8/10. Writing for Decider, Joel Keller gave the series a "Stream It" recommendation, describing it as an "intriguing, multilayered mystery" that effectively balances the protagonist's personal ambition with a tense procedural element. But Why Tho? praised the show for its exploration of identity and class within the high-fashion world, noting that the series "subverts expectations of the typical 'con artist' trope" by grounding Sarah’s motivations in survival rather than pure greed.

Pierce Conran of the South China Morning Post gave the series 3 out of 5 stars, describing it as a "glitzy, high-stakes mystery" that benefits from polished production values, though he noted that the plot occasionally "stretches credibility" in its later episodes. Similarly, Ready Steady Cut complimented the "slick direction" by Kim Jin-min but observed that the eight-episode format felt slightly "padded", suggesting the story could have been tighter. The Straits Times noted Shin Hye-sun's "uncanny ability" to portray fraudulent yet empathetic characters, comparing her role to her previous work but noting the "darker, more cynical edge" present in The Art of Sarah. India Today highlighted the "crackling chemistry" between Shin and Lee Joon-hyuk, stating that their intellectual cat-and-mouse game provided the show's strongest emotional beats.

However, some critics were more reserved regarding the narrative's complexity. The Hindu described the series as a "slow-burn drama" that may test the patience of viewers looking for a standard thriller, though it ultimately praised the finale for providing a "satisfying, if somber, resolution". The review specifically lauded the series for its "unflinching look at the cost of reinvention".

In South Korea, critics focused on the "sharpened chemistry" between Shin and Lee. JoyNews24 and K-Star News lauded the intellectual tension between the leads, while Cine21 highlighted Shin's "technical transformation" across her character's various lies. NBN TV and TV Daily observed that the fictional brand served as a metaphor for the "mask of desire", praising director Kim Jin-min for maintaining a "suspenseful, slow-burn atmosphere" that offered a scathing critique of modern materialism. SportsQ commented on the screenplay's pacing, noting that the eight-episode structure allowed for a "dense psychological tug-of-war" that avoided the narrative bloating common in longer-form dramas.

The Korea Times analyzed the show as a "timely exposé" of South Korea's "luxury obsession", noting that the series arrived at a moment when the country's per capita spending on luxury goods was among the highest in the world. The review praised the show for "stripping away the glamour" to reveal the hollow nature of status-seeking. It further noted that the fictional brand "Boudoir" served as a "chilling mirror" to real-world consumer behavior, where brand names often supersede personal identity.

=== Viewership ===
The Art of Sarah debuted at number three on Netflix's global weekly chart for non-English shows, recording 3.8 million views within its first three days. The series saw a significant surge in its second week, rising to the number-one position globally for the week ending February 22, 2026, with 10 million views. It maintained its number-one ranking for a second consecutive week through March 1, accumulating an additional 4.3 million views. During its chart-topping run, the series reached the number-one spot in eight territories, and appeared in the Top 10 lists of 49 countries. In its fourth week on the chart, ending March 8, the series added 2.1 million views and remains in the global Top 10.

=== Accolades ===
Award ceremony	Year	Category	Nominee	Result	Ref.
Baeksang Arts Awards	2026	Best Actress	Shin Hye-sun	Nominated	
Baeksang Arts Awards	2026	Best Supporting Actress	Lee E-dam	Nominated	
Baeksang Arts Awards	2026	Best Screenplay	Chu Song-yeon	Nominated	
Global OTT Awards	2026	Best Lead Actress	Shin Hye-sun	Won	
Global OTT Awards	2026	Best Supporting Actress	Lee E-dam	Nominated	
Blue Dragon Series Awards	2026	Best Actress	Shin Hae-sun	Won	
Blue Dragon Series Awards	2026	Best Supporting Actress	Park Bo-kyung	Won	
Korean Association of Film Critics Awards	2026	OTT Series Best Actress	Shin Hye-sun	Won	
