= Kim Jae-won (actor, born 2001) =

South Korean actor (born 2001)

- Kim in 2026
- Born: February 9, 2001 (age 25); South Korea
- Education: School of Performing Arts Seoul; Chung-Ang University (Theater)
- Occupations: Actor; model
- Years active: 2018–present
- Agent: Mystic Story

Korean name
- Hangul: 김재원
- Hanja: 金載沅
- RR: Gim Jaewon
- MR: Kim Chaewŏn

Kim Jae-won (Korean: 김재원; born February 9, 2001) is a South Korean actor and model. He is known for his roles in Yumi's Cells season 3 (2026), Hierarchy (2024), Our Blues (2022), and King the Land (2023).

== Early life and education ==
Kim was born on February 9, 2001, in Seoul, South Korea.

He graduated from high school at School of Performing Arts Seoul in Department of Theatre & Film. He attended Chung-Ang University in Performance Film Creation department.

== Career ==
=== 2018–2021: Career beginning ===
Kim Jae-won made his debut as a fashion model in 2018, and subsequently commencing his acting journey in 2021 with the Filipino-Korean web series Love From Home directed by Kristel Fulgar, and later appearing in the series titled Romanced.

=== 2022–present: Rising popularity ===
In 2022, Kim made his notable appearance in the television drama Our Blues on tvN, portraying the character of a young Cha Seung-won. After playing the role he received immense adoration from the viewers and left a lasting impression. Continuing to demonstrate his talent, he was then cast as the lead protagonist, Je Soo-oh, in the EBS television drama Fall For You. Excellently portraying the role of a beloved high school student, which he effectively embodied the image of first love.

In the year 2023, an additional invitation was extended to him, presenting an opportunity to showcase his talent in the renowned television series Stealer: The Treasure Keeper on tvN. In this production, he assumed the role of Shin Chang-hoon, a former homicide detective. Furthermore, he has made a recent appearance in the JTBC romantic comedy drama King the Land.

In 2024, Kim took on the lead role for the first time in the original Netflix drama series Hierarchy as Kim Ri-an, alongside Roh Jeong-eui and Lee Chae-min, and will debut in the sageuk drama The Tale of Lady Ok.

In 2025 Kim was set to appear in another Netflix original series The Art of Sarah. He has been confirmed to play the role of Shin Soon-rok, love interest of Kim Yumi (Kim Go-eun) in the third season of the drama Yumi's Cells. On February 2, 2026, it was announced that Kim will serve as host of Music Bank alongside Izna's Bang Jee-min and will start on the February 27, 2026 episode.

== Filmography ==
Key
†	Denotes films that have not yet been released

=== Endorsement ===
Year	Brand / Company	Product / Campaign	Notes	Ref.
2024	McDonald's Korea	McDonald's Campaign		

=== Film ===
Year	Title	Role	Ref.
2022	Dream Maker	Nam Joo-hwan	
2022	My Life's Timeline	Lee Sun-taek	
2026	Final Interview	Han Jin-woo	
TBA	My First Graduation †	Gu Do-ha	

=== Television series ===
Year	Title	Role	Notes	Ref.
2022	Our Blues	Young Choi Han-soo		
2022	Fall for You	Je Su-o		
2022	KBS Drama Special	Seo Woo-kyu	Episode: "Like Otters"	
2023	Stealer: The Treasure Keeper	Shin Chang-hoon		
2023	King the Land	Lee Ro-woon		
2024	Hierarchy	Kim Ri-an		
2024	The Tale of Lady Ok	Sung Do-gyeom		
2025	You and Everything Else	Cheon Sang-heok		
2026	The Art of Sarah	Kang Ji-hwon		
2026	Yumi's Cells	Shin Soon-rok	Season 3	
TBA	Sea Village Cloud Pension †	Cheon Ri-an		

=== Web series ===
Year	Title	Role	Notes	Ref.
2021	Love From Home	Jay	Filipino-Korean series	
2021	Romanced	Jung Ma-ro		
2022	To My Star: Our Untold Stories	Lee Jae-won	Season 2	

=== Television shows ===
Year	Title	Role	Notes	Ref.
2025	Heart on Wheels	Regular Member		

=== Hosting ===
Year	Title	Note	Ref.
2026	Music Bank	With Bang Jee-min	
2026	Korea Grand Music Awards	Day 2; with Liz	

=== Music video appearances ===
Year	Song title	Artist	Ref.
2024	"track by YOON: It's gonna be alright" (괜찮아지겠지)	Eddy Kim & Yoon Jong-shin	

== Awards and nominations ==
Name of the award ceremony, year presented, category, nominee of the award, and the result of the nomination
Award ceremony	Year	Category	Nominee / Work	Result	Ref.
Blue Dragon Series Awards	2026	Best New Actor	Yumi's Cells – Season 3	Won	
KBS Entertainment Awards	2025	Best Entertainer Award (Reality)	Heart on Wheels	Won	
Marie Claire Asia Star Awards	2026	Rising Star Award	Kim Jae-won	Won	
