= Dolphin (film) =

- Theatrical release poster
- Hangul: 돌핀
- RR: Dolpin
- MR: Tolp'in
- Directed by: Bae Du-ri
- Written by: Bae Du-ri
- Produced by: Joh Keun-shik; Jo Seong-won; Na Kyeong-chan; Noh Il-hwan
- Starring: Kwon Yu-ri; Gil Hae-yeon
- Cinematography: Kim Him-chan
- Edited by: Bae Du-ri; Kim Hye-kyeong
- Music by: Michael Wonyoung Choi
- Production company: Korean Academy of Film Arts (KAFA)
- Distributed by: Mano Entertainment Inc. (South Korea); Finecut Co., Ltd. (International)
- Release dates: April 28, 2023 (JIFF); March 13, 2024 (South Korea)
- Running time: 90 minutes
- Country: South Korea
- Language: Korean
- Box office: US$42,047

Dolphin (Korean: 돌핀) is a 2023 South Korean drama film written, directed and co-edited by Bae Du-ri in her directorial debut. It stars Kwon Yu-ri, Gil Hae-yeon, Hyun Woo-seok, Sim Hee-seop and Park Mi-hyun. It was selected as Bae Du-ri's graduation project at the Korean Academy of Film Arts (KAFA), as part of the academy's 2021 feature-length production program. The film had its world premiere in Korean Cinema section at 24th Jeonju International Film Festival on April 28, 2023. It was released theatrically in South Korea on March 13, 2024.

== Plot ==
Na-young (Kwon Yu-ri), a 30-year-old local newspaper reporter who grew up in a beautiful small seaside village in Seocheon, prioritizes her family and friends. On the other hand, her mother, Jeong-ok (Gil Hae-yeon), intends to sell their beloved house full of memories, but her younger brother, Seong-woon (Hyun Woo-seok) insists on going to Seoul. While Na-young attempts to embrace the changes, Mi-sook (Park Mi-hyun) introduces her to bowling, and she gradually spends more time at the bowling alley. Along with that, she is developing feelings for Hae-soo (Sim Hee-seop), a man from Seoul who has recently relocated to Seocheon.

== Cast ==
- Kwon Yu-ri as Na-young
- Gil Hae-yeon as Jeong-ok
- Hyun Woo-seok as Seong-woon
- Sim Hee-seop as Hae-soo
- Park Mi-hyun as Mi-sook

== Release ==
On April 28, 2023, the film would have its worldwide premiere at the 24th Jeonju International Film Festival in the Korean Cinema section.

The film was selected for screening at 11th Muju Film Festival held from 2 to 6 June 2023. The film was also premiered in 'Focus (Fókusz)' category at 16th Korean Film Festival in Hungary on 16 October 2023. It was selected for screening in 'Festival Choice' category at 49th Seoul Independent Film Festival on 2 December 2023. It was shown in the 'International Spotlight Feature Narrative' section at 27th Vancouver Asian Film Festival, held from November 2 to 12, 2023. Dolphin premiered in theaters in South Korea on March 13, 2024, in Taiwan on March 29 and in Hong Kong on July 6, 2024.

The film is distributed internationally by Finecut, in Taiwan by Creative Century Entertainment and in Hong Kong by Pink Flame Studio.

== Reception ==
=== Box office ===
The film was released on 67 screens on March 13, 2024.

As of September 30, 2024, it is at 22nd place among all the Korean specialty films released in the year 2024, with gross of US$42,047 and 6,374 admissions.
