= The Table: Day and Night =

2026 South Korean film by Kim Jong-kwan

- Theatrical release poster
- Hangul: 낮과 밤은 서로에게
- RR: Natgwa bameun seoroege
- MR: Natkwa pamŭn sŏroëge
- Directed by: Kim Jong-kwan
- Produced by: Baek Gyeong-suk
- Starring: Kim Min-ha; Joo Jong-hyuk; Han Sun-hwa; Chang Ryul; Shim Eun-kyung; Lee Hee-jun; Jeon So-young; Kim Dong-hwi
- Cinematography: Kim Ji-yong; Lee Ju-yeon
- Production companies: Be Leaf Inc.; Alleyway Co., Ltd.; Purple A Co., Ltd.
- Distributed by: K-Movie Entertainment
- Release dates: October 6, 2026 (BIFF); November 4, 2026 (South Korea)
- Country: South Korea
- Language: Korean

The Table: Day and Night (Korean: 낮과 밤은 서로에게) is a 2026 South Korean romantic drama anthology film directed by Kim Jong-kwan. Starring Kim Min-ha, Joo Jong-hyuk, Han Sun-hwa, Chang Ryul, Shim Eun-kyung, Lee Hee-jun, Jeon So-young, and Kim Dong-hwi, the film follows four couples who cross paths at a café as the seasons change from summer to autumn.

The film had its premiere at the 31st Busan International Film Festival, opening the festival on October 6, 2026. It will be released theatrically on November 4, 2026 following its premiere at Busan.

== Stories ==
There are four stories in the film:

Story	Title	Main cast	Synopsis
1	"A Midsummer Night's Dream" (Korean: 한 여름밤의 꿈)	Kim Min-ha, Joo Jong-hyuk	The story revolves around a chance encounter between two people who visit the same café at different times.
2	"People Who Are Still Me" (Korean: 아직 나인 사람들)	Han Sun-hwa, Chang Ryul	It tells the story of two school friends, who meet unexpectedly and bond.
3	"Yi.Soon.Bul" (Korean: 이.순.불)	Shim Eun-kyung, Lee Hee-jun	It follows a spark of creative chemistry between a web novelist and indie filmmaker.
4	"Autumn Story" (Korean: 가을 이야기)	Jeon So-young, Kim Dong-hwi	The story tells about a bittersweet moment between an idol trainee and her boyfriend.

== Cast ==
- Kim Min-ha as Yoo-jin
- Joo Jong-hyuk as Hyeon-oh
- Han Sun-hwa as Sang-mi
- Chang Ryul as Young-min
- Shim Eun-kyung as Hye-jin
- Lee Hee-jun as Dong-man
- Jeon So-young as Na-kyung
- Kim Dong-hwi as Jong-su

== Production ==
Announced in August 2024, the film - an anthology production by Be Leaf Inc., Alleyway Co., Ltd. and Purple A Co., Ltd. - is directed by Kim Jong-kwan and starring Kim Min-ha, Joo Jong-hyuk, Han Sun-hwa, Chang Ryul, Shim Eun-kyung, Lee Hee-jun, Jeon So-young, and Kim Dong-hwi in different stories.

Principal photography began in September 2024.

== Release ==
The Table: Day and Night had its world premiere at the 31st Busan International Film Festival on October 6, 2026, opening the festival. Following its premiere at the festival, it is scheduled for release on November 4, 2026 in South Korean theatres by K-Movie Entertainment.

== Reception ==
James Marsh of Variety reviewing the film at Busan International Film Festival, criticized the director Kim Jong-kwan for seeking the narrative possibilities of its setting over fully developing its characters and stories. Marsh noted that "as the film closes with a montage of empty, inviting tables," it reinforced this impression further, suggesting unrealised narrative potential.
