= Joo Jong-hyuk (actor, born 1991) =

South Korean actor (born 1991)

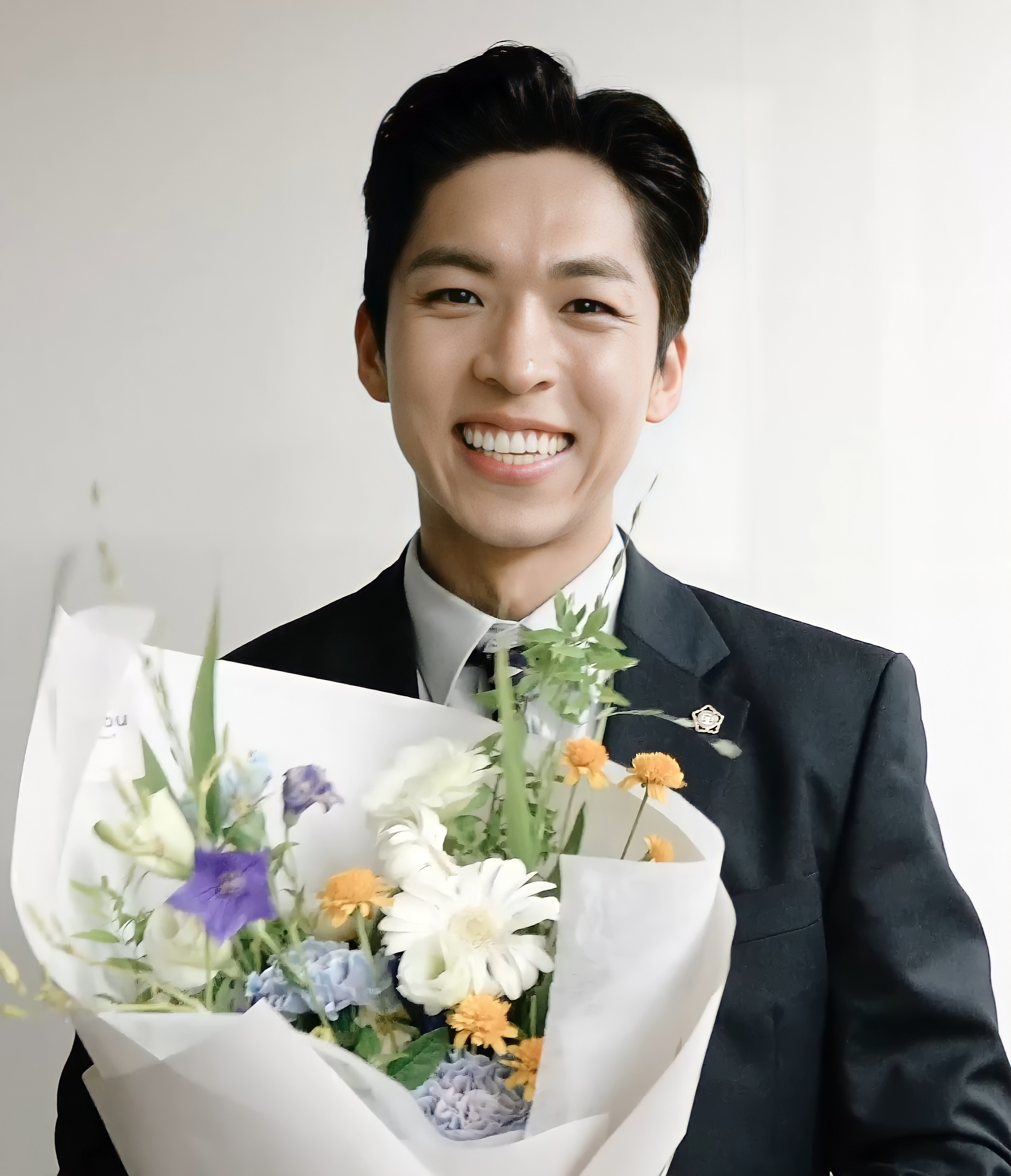
- Joo in 2022
- Born: July 27, 1991 (age 35); Incheon, South Korea
- Education: Auckland University of Technology (Major in Hotel Management and Marketing)
- Occupation: Actor
- Years active: 2015–present
- Agent: BH Entertainment

Korean name
- Hangul: 주종혁
- RR: Ju Jonghyeok
- MR: Chu Chonghyŏk

Joo Jong-hyuk (born July 27, 1991) is a South Korean actor. He notably appeared in 2022 television series Extraordinary Attorney Woo as lawyer Kwon Min-woo. His other appearances include Yumi's Cells (2021–2022), D.P. (2021), Happiness (2021), and Frankly Speaking (2024).

== Filmography ==
=== Film ===
Year	Title	Role	Notes	Ref.
2020	Them in Us			
2022	Spy Model	Kim Hyung-woo	Independent film	
2022	A Very Hot Wind		Short film	
2023	Iron Mask	Kim Jae-woo		
2023	Because I Hate Korea	Jae-in		
2026	The Table: Day and Night		Opening film of BIFF	

=== Television series ===
Television series appearances
Year	Title	Role	Notes	Ref.
2021	The Veil	Chang-gyu		
2021–2022	Yumi's Cells	Louis	Season 1–2	
2021	Happiness	Kim Seung-bum		
2021	D.P.	Lee Hyo-sang		
2022	Extraordinary Attorney Woo	Kwon Min-woo		
2022	KBS Drama Special: "Do You Know Ashtanga"	Seol Tae-joon	One act-drama	
2023	Dr. Romantic	Interviewee	Cameo (Season 3, Episode 2)	
2024	Frankly Speaking	Kim Jung-heon		
2025	Unmasked	Kang Ki-ho		
2025	Confidence Queen	Myung Gu-ho		
2025	Tempest	Park Chang-hee		
2026	KBS Drama Special: "Sound:Track"	Kang Jin-woo	One act-drama	

=== Hosting ===
Year	Title	Notes	Ref.
2022	The Korean Festival - 120 Years of Dreams	With Park So-hyun	
2022	5th Jeonju International Short Film Festival	With Yoon Geum-seon-ah	

=== Television shows ===
Year	Title	Role	Notes	Ref.
2025	Perfect Glow	Host		

== Awards and nominations ==
Name of the award ceremony, year presented, category, nominee of the award, and the result of the nomination
Award ceremony	Year	Category	Nominee / Work	Result	Ref.
A-Awards	2022	A-Awards – Unique	Extraordinary Attorney Woo	Won	
Baeksang Arts Awards	2023	Best New Actor – Television	Extraordinary Attorney Woo	Nominated	
Baeksang Arts Awards	2024	Best New Actor – Film	Iron Mask	Nominated	
KBS Drama Awards	2022	Best Actor in Drama Special/TV Cinema	In My Ashtanga Class	Nominated	
