= Hyun Woo-seok =

South Korean actor (born 2001)

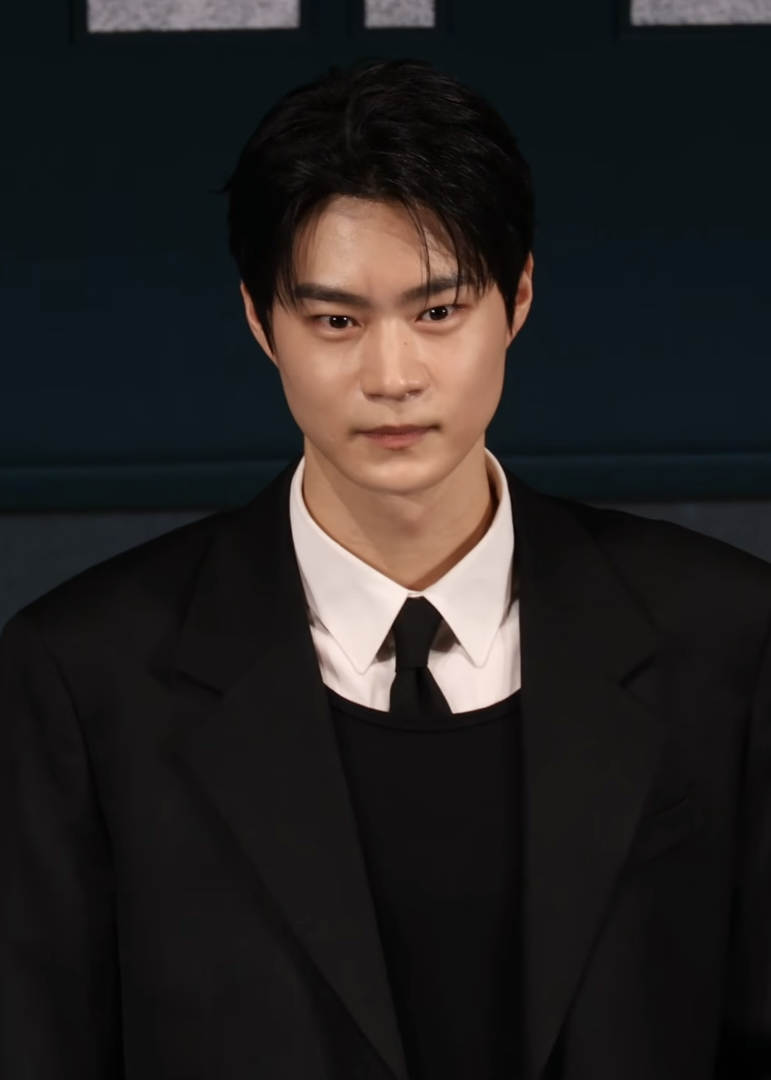
- Hyun in April 2026
- Born: May 8, 2001 (age 24); South Korea
- Occupation: Actor
- Years active: 2019–present
- Agent: XYZ Studio

Korean name
- Hangul: 현우석
- RR: Hyeon Useok
- MR: Hyŏn Usŏk

Hyun Woo-seok (Korean: 현우석; born May 8, 2001) is a South Korean actor.

== Filmography ==
=== Film ===
Key
†	Denotes films that have not yet been released

Year	Title	Role	Notes	Ref.
2020	The Day I Died: Unclosed Case	Se-jin's friend		
2022	A Home from Home	Do-yoon		
2023	Dolphin	Seong-woon		
2024	404 Still Remain, Our 5 Minutes	Seong Jae-min		
2024	Time to Be Strong	Tae-hee		
2025	Go to Restaurant	Kim Woo-bin		

=== Television series ===
Key
†	Denotes television productions that have not yet been released

Year	Title	Role	Notes	Ref.
2019	Love Alarm			
2020	The School Nurse Files	Oh Seung-kwon		
2020–2021	Live On	Kwon Sung-joon		
2022	Cheer Up	Kim Min-jae		
2026	If Wishes Could Kill	Kang Ha-joon		

=== Web series ===
Year	Title	Role	Notes	Ref.
2019	Nineteen			
