= Park Bo-kyung =

South Korean actress (born 1981)

- Born: Park Bo-kyung; 27 November 1981 (age 44); Seoul, South Korea
- Other name: Park Bo-kyeong
- Education: Korea National University of Arts (Department of Theater)
- Occupations: Actress; model
- Years active: 2001–present
- Agent: L'July Entertainment
- Known for: Now, We Are Breaking Up; Beyond Evil; Link: Eat, Love, Kill
- Spouse: Jin Seon-kyu (m. 2011)
- Children: 2

Korean name
- Hangul: 박보경
- RR: Bak Bogyeong
- MR: Pak Pogyŏng

Park Bo-kyung (Korean: 박보경; born 27 November 1981) is a South Korean actress. She is known for her roles in dramas such as Now, We Are Breaking Up, Beyond Evil, Link: Eat, Love, Kill, and Little Women. She also appeared in movies Hello, Schoolgirl, Mr. XXX-Kisser and The Gangster, the Cop, the Devil.

== Career ==
Park Bo-kyung made her debut as fashion model in 2001, followed by a debut as a theater actor in 2002. She made her big screen debut with a small role through the 2008 movie Hello, Schoolgirl. She took a gap of about 8 years after marriage to focus on her role as a mother. Since 2019, she has appeared in various television shows and films. Some of her notable works include JTBC's Monster, SBS' Now, We're Breaking Up, Netflix's Boy Judgment, tvN's Little Women, JTBC's Bad Mom, and Disney+'s Moving. Park Bo-kyung left a strong impression as Park Jae-sang's (Eom Ki-jun) chief of staff and villainous Go Soo-im in Little Women, and attracted attention by appearing as the mysterious head's wife in Bad Mom. Her skills accumulated through her long career as a theater actor are being recognized and she is shining. Park Bo-kyung added her strength by making a surprise appearance in The Roundup: Punishment.

== Personal life ==
Park married actor Jin Seon-kyu in 2011. They have two children, a daughter and a son.

== Filmography ==
Key
†	Denotes films that have not yet been released

=== Film ===
Year	Title	Role	Ref.
2008	Hello, Schoolgirl	Newlywed woman	
2012	Mr. XXX-Kisser	Middle aged woman	
2017	The Mayor	Gil-soo's wife	
2019	Romang	Lee Mae-ja	
2019	The Gangster, the Cop, the Devil	Victim's wife	
2019	Man of Men	Ceramics store employee	
2022	Heartbeat	Elevator mom	
2023	Hopeless	Mo-kyung	
2024	The Roundup: Punishment	Autopsy doctor	

=== Television series ===
Year	Title	Role	Note	Ref.
2019	The Running Mates: Human Rights	Jin Jin-nyeo		
2020	Hospital Playlist	Chang-hak's wife	Special appearance	
2021	Beyond Evil	Im Sun-nyeo		
2021	Now, We Are Breaking Up	Choi Ji-yeon		
2021	Shadow Beauty	Ha-neul's mother		
2022	Juvenile Justice	Ji-hoo's mother		
2022	Link: Eat, Love, Kill	Jang Mi-sook		
2022	Little Women	Go Soo-im		
2023	The Good Bad Mother	The wife of the village's head		
2023	Moving	Shin Yoon-young	Season 1	
2023	Soundtrack 2	Kim Soo-min		
2023	Like Flowers in Sand	Seo Sook-hee		
2024	Flex X Cop	Ha Hye-kyung	Special appearance	
2024	Queen Woo	Jol-bon		
2024	Squid Game	Player 254	Season 2	
2025	The Witch	Realtor	Cameo; Ep 4	
2025	Love Scout	Kim Hye-jin		
2025	Mother and Mom	Song Ho-gyeong		
2026	The Art of Sarah	Jeong Yeo-jin		

== Stage ==
=== Musical ===
Musical performance(s)
Year	Title		Role	Theater	Date	Ref.
Year	English	Korean	Role	Theater	Date	Ref.
2004	The Mirror Princess Pyeonggang Story 2004 Acappela Festival Official Opening Work	거울공주 평강이야기 2004 아카펠라 페스티발 공식 오픈작	Soldier 1 (Lu)	Inkel Art Hall Building 2	October 12 – November 7	
2004	The Mirror Princess Pyeonggang Story	거울공주 평강이야기	Soldier 1 (Lu)	Seoul Arts Center	December 13–15	
2007	Oh! While You were Sleeping	오 당신이 잠든사이	Choi Min-hee	JTN Art Hall 4	January 6 – July 22	
2008	The Mirror Princess Pyeonggang Story	거울공주 평강이야기	Soldier 1 (Lu)	Star Stage (Former One Pass Art Hall)	October 11, 2008 – January 4, 2009	

=== Theater ===
Theater play performances
Year	Title		Role	Theater	Date	Ref.
Year	English	Korean	Role	Theater	Date	Ref.
2007	Let's go to karaoke... Shall we talk?	우리 노래방 가서... 얘기 좀 할까?	Daughter-in-law	Daehak-ro Star City	July 4–15	
2007	You loved him	그자식 사랑했네	Mi-young	Arko Art Theater Small Theater	December 11–30	
2008	Let's go to karaoke... Shall we talk?	우리 노래방 가서... 얘기 좀 할까?	Girlfriend	Naan Theater	March 7 – April 6	
2008	You loved him	그자식 사랑했네	Mi-young	Theater that Came Out	April 12 – May 12	
2008	Let's go! Third, "Annapurna in My Heart"	우르르~간다! 세 번째 <내 마음의 안나푸르나>	Mother	Theater that Came Out	May 16 – June 18	
2008	Annapurna in My Heart	내 마음의 안나푸르나	Mother	Daehak-ro Star City	July 4–15	
2009	70 Minutes of Romance - He & She	70분간의 연애－He＆She	Song Ji-soo	Daehakro Sangsang Art Hall White (Sangsang White Small Theater)	January 8 – October 4	
2009	Shall We Go to the Noraebang and Talk?	우리 노래방 가서... 얘기 좀 할까？	Girlfriend	Miarigogae Art Theater	March 6 – May 5	
2009	70 Minutes of Romance - He & She	70분간의 연애－He＆She	Song Ji-soo	Former BNK Busan Bank Joheun Theater 2	October 30 – November 29	
2010	I'll Get Married in May	오월엔 결혼할꺼야	Choi Se-yeon (Math Instructor)	JTN Art Hall 2	March 1–31	
2010	I'll Get Married in May	오월엔 결혼할꺼야	Choi Se-yeon (Math Instructor)	Former BNK Busan Bank Joheun Theater 2	March 26 – May 30	
2011–2012	Cats on the Roof	옥탑방 고양이	Lee Kyung-min	Sindorim Prime Art Hall	July 8 – January 29	
2015	Judo Boy	유도소년	Hwa-yeong	Art One Theater Hall 3	February 7 – May 3	
2015	Me and Grandpa	나와 할아버지 - 고양	Grandmother	Yegreen Theater	May 5 – August 2	
2015	Judo Boy	유도소년	Hwa-yeong	Ansan Culture & Arts Center Dalmaeji Theater	May 21–24	
2015	Judo Boy	유도소년	Hwa-yeong	Osan Cultural Arts Center Grand Theater	October 2–3	
2015	Judo Boy	유도소년	Hwa-yeong	Daegu Bongsan Cultural Center Grand Theater (Gaon Hall)	October 9–10	
2015	Judo Boy	유도소년	Hwa-yeong	Uijeongbu Arts Center Small Theater	October 23–24	

== Awards and nominations ==
Name of the award ceremony, year presented, category, nominee of the award, and the result of the nomination
Award ceremony	Year	Category	Nominee / Work	Result	Ref.
Blue Dragon Series Awards	2026	Best Supporting Actress	The Art of Sarah	Won	
