= Lee Min-jae =

South Korean actor (born 2000)

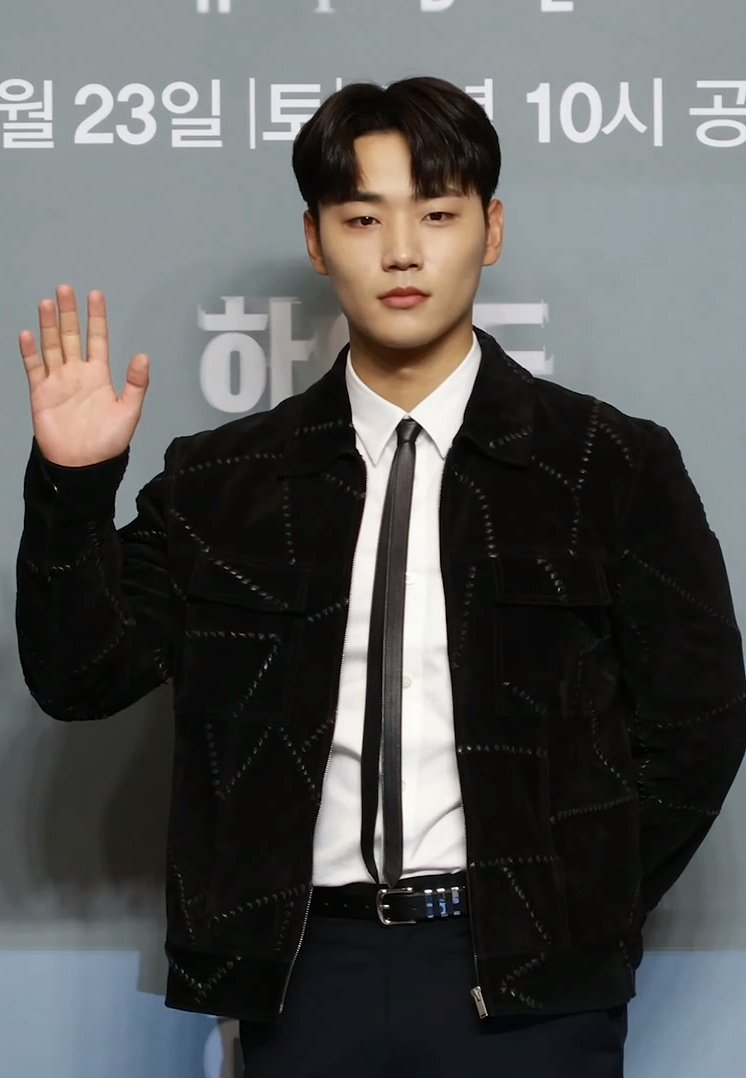
- Lee in March 2024
- Born: January 21, 2000 (age 26); Masan, South Korea
- Education: Chung-Ang University
- Occupation: Actor
- Years active: 2016–present
- Agent: Ikkle Entertainment

Korean name
- Hangul: 이민재
- Hanja: 李旼宰
- RR: I Minjae
- MR: I Minjae
- Website: Official website

Lee Min-jae (Korean: 이민재; born January 21, 2000) is a South Korean actor under Ikkle Entertainment. He is best known in Train (2020), Crash Course in Romance (2023) and Weak Hero Class 2 (2025).

== Early life ==
Lee Min-Jae was born in 2000, in Masan, South Korea. He graduated from Chung-Ang University's Department of Theater.

He has been training in martial arts (Taekwondo and Hapkido) since 2014 and owns a Black Belt fourth rank in Taekwondo.

== Filmography ==
=== Film ===
Year	Title	Role	Notes	Ref.
2018	Last Child	Sung-woo		
2019	The Present	Kyu-min		
2019	My Punch-Drunk Boxer	Medical staff		
2024	Uprising	Kiddo		
2025	Boy In The Pool	Woo-Ju		

=== Television series ===
Year	Title	Role	Ref.
2020	Train	Seo Do-won (young)	
2020	Homemade Love Story	Woo Jung-ho (young)	
2021	Bossam: Steal the Fate	Prince Neung-yang	
2021	Taxi Driver	Oh Hak-Su	
2021	Racket Boys	National Junior Athlete (Cameo)	
2022	Love All Play	Eden	
2022	Hunted	Hyun-min	
2022	The Golden Spoon	Kwon Min-ho	
2022	Cheer Up	Do Jae-yi	
2022	Trolley	Jin Seung-ho	
2023	Crash Course in Romance	Seo Geon-hoo	
2023	Oh! Youngsim	Lee Chae-dong	
2024	Hide	Do Jin-woo	
2025	Kick Kick Kick Kick	Lee Min-jae	
2025	Weak Hero Class 2	Go Hyun-tak	
2025	My Troublesome Star	Dokgo Cheol (young)	
2026	A Love Other Than Yours	Lee Wan-do	
TBA	No Crushing Allowed	Gong Su-ho	
