= Kick Kick Kick Kick =

2025 South Korean television series

- Promotional poster
- Hangul: 킥킥킥킥
- RR: Kikkikkikkik
- MR: K'ikk'ikk'ikk'ik
- Genre: Sitcom; Office comedy
- Written by: Jung Soo-hyun; Nam Eun-kyung; Jung Hae-young
- Directed by: Koo Seong-jun
- Starring: Ji Jin-hee; Lee Kyu-hyung; Baek Ji-won; Lee Min-jae
- Music by: Mathi
- Country of origin: South Korea
- Original language: Korean
- No. of episodes: 12

Production
- Executive producers: Kim Shin-il (CP); Lee Ho (CP)
- Producers: Kim Chang-min; Kim Dong-goo; Lee Sang-hyun; Yoon Bo-ra
- Running time: 60 minutes
- Production companies: DK E&M; Ikkle Entertainment

Original release
- Network: KBS2
- Release: February 5 – March 13, 2025

Kick Kick Kick Kick (Korean: 킥킥킥킥) is a 2025 South Korean sitcom office comedy television series co-written by Jung Soo-hyun, Nam Eun-kyung, and Jung Hae-young, directed by Koo Seong-jun, and starring Ji Jin-hee, Lee Kyu-hyung, Baek Ji-won, and Lee Min-jae. It aired on KBS2 from February 5, to March 13, 2025, every Wednesday and Thursday at 22:50 (KST).

Initially aired at 21:50, its fourth episode on February 13, 2025 drew a nationwide rating of 0.7%, breaking the record of 2020 KBS2 series Welcome for the lowest single-episode rating for a drama airing in a primetime slot on a free-to-air network. After KBS2 moved it to a late-night time slot of 22:50 ostensibly to target a younger demographic, its ratings further declined to a record low of 0.3% on March 6, 2025.

== Synopsis ==
Ji Jin-hee and Jo Young-sik, who are former stars in the entertainment industry decided to establish a new content production company, Kick Kick Kick Kick Company, where they race to reach three million subscribers.

== Cast and characters ==
=== Main ===
- Ji Jin-hee as Ji Jin-hee

A national actor and the co-CEO of Kick Kick Kick Kick Company.

- Lee Kyu-hyung as Jo Young-sik

A co-CEO of Kick Kick Kick Kick Company.

- Baek Ji-won as Baek Ji-won

A dedicated therapist for the 'Kick Kick Kick Kick Company' staff.

- Lee Min-jae as Lee Min-jae

The epitome of workaholic MZ.

=== Supporting ===
- Jeong Han-seol as Noh In-sung
- Jeon Hye-yeon as Wang Jo-yeon
- Kim Eun-ho as Kang Tae-ho
- Jeon So-young as Ga Joo-ha
- Baek Sun-ho as Lee Mark
- Lee Se-joon as Michael
- Seo Hye-won as Seo Hye-won
- Lee Ji-won as Hee Dong-yi

== Production ==
=== Development ===
In 2024, it was reported that KBS would be launching a new sitcom titled Kick Kick Kick Kick in the second half of 2024. The series is directed by Koo Seung-jun and co-written by Jung Soo-hyun, Nam Eun-kyung, and Jung Hae-young. DK E&M and Ji Jin-hee's agency Ikkle Entertainment are co-producing the drama.

=== Casting ===
On May 30, 2024, Ji Jin-hee was cast as the main character for the series. On August 5, Lee Kyu-hyung was offered to star alongside Ji and positively reviewing it. On September 10, Baek Ji-won was also considering to appear. On December 11, KBS officially confirmed the appearances of Ji, Lee, Baek, and Lee Min-jae.

=== Filming ===
Principal photography began in August 2024.

== Release ==
Kick Kick Kick Kick was scheduled to premiere on KBS2 on February 5, 2025, and would air every Wednesday and Thursday at 21:50 (KST). Starting from episode 7, KBS announced that the series will be airing at 22:50 (KST).

== Ratings ==
Average TV viewership ratings (nationwide)
Ep.	Original broadcast date	Average audience share (Nielsen Korea)
1	February 5, 2025	2.1% (27th)
2	February 6, 2025	1.0% (45th)
3	February 12, 2025	1.2% (37th)
4	February 13, 2025	0.7% (60th)
5	February 19, 2025	1.0% (42nd)
6	February 20, 2025	0.7% (60th)
7 (Note: From the seventh episode onwards, KBS2 changed the time slot from 21:50 to 22:50 in an attempt to target younger demographics amid record-low ratings.)	February 26, 2025	0.4% (68th)
8	February 27, 2025	0.4% (75th)
9	March 5, 2025	0.4% (70th)
10	March 6, 2025	0.3% (79th)
11	March 12, 2025	0.4% (69th)
12	March 13, 2025	0.3% (78th)
Average		0.7%
In the table above, the blue numbers represent the lowest ratings and the red numbers represent the highest ratings.
