= Blue Dragon Series Awards =

Annual awards ceremony

- Hangul: 청룡시리즈어워즈
- RR: Cheongnyong sirijeu eowojeu
- MR: Ch'ŏngnyong sirijŭ ŏwŏjŭ
- Awarded for: Excellence in streaming television and OTT
- Country: South Korea
- First award: July 19, 2022; 4 years ago
- Organised by: Sports Chosun
- Website: bsa.blueaward.co.kr

Television/radio coverage
- Network: KBS2

The Blue Dragon Series Awards (Korean: 청룡시리즈어워즈) is an annual awards ceremony that is organised by Sports Chosun (a sister brand of the Chosun Ilbo) for excellence in streaming television and OTT in South Korea.

The Blue Dragon Series Awards considers only original dramas and variety shows produced and invested in by streaming services offered in Korea, including Netflix, Disney+, seezn, Apple TV+, Genie TV, Watcha, Wavve, Kakao TV, Coupang Play, and TVING.

== History ==
It was created in 2022 by Sports Chosun newspaper.

The 1st Blue Dragon Series Awards ceremony was held on July 19, 2022, at Incheon Paradise Hotel. In this edition, 13 categories were awarded. The nominations for 13 categories were announced for the Korean OTT's series.

== Categories ==
- Best Drama
- Best Entertainment Program
- Best Actor
- Best Actress
- Best Supporting Actor
- Best Supporting Actress
- Best New Actor
- Best New Actress
- Best Male Entertainer
- Best Female Entertainer
- Best New Male Entertainer
- Best New Female Entertainer
- Popular Star Award

== Ceremonies ==
Edition	Year	Venue	Hosts	Ref.
1st	July 19, 2022	Paradise City, Incheon	Jun Hyun-moo and Lim Yoona	
2nd	July 19, 2023	Paradise City, Incheon	Jun Hyun-moo and Lim Yoona	
3rd	July 19, 2024	Paradise City, Incheon	Jun Hyun-moo and Lim Yoona	
4th	July 18, 2025	Paradise City, Incheon	Jun Hyun-moo and Lim Yoona	
5th	July 31, 2026	Paradise City, Incheon	Jun Hyun-moo and Lim Yoona	

== Awards ==
=== Grand Prize ===
Edition	Year	Blue Dragon's Choice (Grand Prize)	Ref.
1st	2022	—N/a	
2nd	2023	Song Hye-kyo	
3rd	2024	Moving	
4th	2025	When Life Gives You Tangerines	
5th	2026	Kim Go-eun	

=== Best Program ===
Edition	Year	Best Drama	Best Entertainment Program	Ref.
1st	2022	D.P.	Transit Love	
2nd	2023	Big Bet	Siren: Survive the Island	
3rd	2024	Daily Dose of Sunshine	The Thought Verification Zone: The Community	
4th	2025	The Trauma Code: Heroes on Call	Culinary Class Wars	
5th	2026	The Legend of Kitchen Soldier	Better Late than Single	

=== Best Acting ===
Edition	Year	Best Actor	Best Actress	Best Supporting Actor	Best Supporting Actress	Best New Actor	Best New Actress	Ref.
1st	2022	Lee Jung-jae (Squid Game)	Kim Go-eun (Yumi's Cells)	Lee Hak-joo (Political Fever)	Kim Shin-rok (Hellbound)	Koo Kyo-hwan (D.P.)	HoYeon Jung (Squid Game)	
2nd	2023	Ha Jung-woo (Narco-Saints)	Bae Suzy (Anna)	Lee Dong-hwi (Big Bet)	Lim Ji-yeon (The Glory)	Park Ji-hoon (Weak Hero Class 1)	Shin Ye-eun (Revenge of Others)	
3rd	2024	Yim Si-wan (Boyhood)	Park Bo-young (Daily Dose of Sunshine)	Ahn Jae-hong (Mask Girl)	Geum Hae-na (A Shop for Killers)	Lee Jung-ha (Moving)	Go Youn-jung (Moving)	
4th	2025	Ju Ji-hoon (The Trauma Code: Heroes on Call)	IU (When Life Gives You Tangerines)	Lee Kwang-soo (Karma)	Yeom Hye-ran (When Life Gives You Tangerines)	Choo Young-woo (The Trauma Code: Heroes on Call)	Kim Min-ha (Way Back Love)	
5th	2026	Park Hae-soo (The Scarecrow)	Shin Hae-sun (The Art of Sarah)	Yoon Kyung-ho (The Legend of Kitchen Soldier)	Park Bo-kyung (The Art of Sarah)	Kim Jae-won (Yumi's Cells – Season 3)	Jeon So-young (If Wishes Could Kill)	

=== Best Entertainer ===
Edition	Year	Best Male Entertainer	Best Female Entertainer	Best New Male Entertainer	Best New Female Entertainer	Ref.
1st	2022	Kang Ho-dong (New Journey to the West: Spring Camp)	Celeb Five (Celeb Five: Behind the Curtain)	Kai (New World)	Joo Hyun-young (SNL Korea)	
2nd	2023	Yoo Jae-suk (Playou Level Up: Villain's World)	Joo Hyun-young (SNL Korea)	Dex (Bloody Game)	Kim Ah-young (SNL Korea)	
3rd	2024	Shin Dong-yup (SNL Korea)	Jang Do-yeon (High School Mystery Club)	Kwak Joon-bin (The Devil's Plan)	Yoon Ga-i (SNL Korea)	
4th	2025	Kian84 (Kian's Bizarre B&B)	Lee Soo-ji (SNL Korea)	Moon Sang-hoon (The Blank Menu for You)	Mimi (Kian is CEO)	
5th	2026	Top Excellence: Kim Won-hun (SNL Korea); Excellence: Joo Woo-jae (Screwballs)	Top Excellence: Kim Sook (Screwballs); Excellence: Jung Yi-rang (Dabang Sisters)	Kim Kyu-won (SNL Korea)	Yoon (The White Collars)	

=== Popularity Awards ===
Edition	Year	Popular Star Awards						OST Popularity Award	Ref.
1st	2022	Jung Hae-in	Han Hyo-joo	Kang Daniel	Lee Yong-jin	Park Jae-chan	Park Seo-ham	—N/a	
2nd	2023	Park Jae-chan	Kim Yeon-koung	Cha Eun-woo	Lee Kwang-soo	—N/a		Park Jae-chan – "Our Season" (Our Season: Spring with Park Jae-chan)	
3rd	2024	Dex	Miyeon	Choi Woo-shik	Park Ji-yoon	—N/a		Zhang Hao – "I Wanna Know" (Exchange)	
4th	2025	Park Bo-gum	IU	Lee Hye-ri	Lee Joon-hyuk	—N/a		Yeonjun – "Boyfriend" (Cinderella at 2 AM)	
5th	2026	Byeon Woo-seok	Go Youn-jung	Yoo Jae-suk	Lee Soo-ji	—N/a		An Yu-jin – "Sad Saltiness" (The Legend of Kitchen Soldier)	

=== Special Awards ===
Edition	Year	Award	Winner	Ref.
1st	2022	—N/a		
2nd	2023	Whynot Award	Choi Hyun-wook (Weak Hero Class 1)	
3rd	2024	Whynot Award	An Yu-jin (Crime Scene Returns)	
4th	2025	LG Uplus Positive Influence Award	Ji Ye-eun	
5th	2026	Global Icon Award with Lavien Cosmetic	Go Youn-jung	
