= Yumi's Cells =

2021 South Korean television series

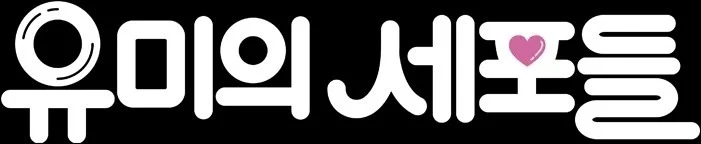
- Hangul: 유미의 세포들
- RR: Yumiui sepodeul
- MR: Yumiŭi sep'odŭl
- Genre: Psychological drama; Romantic drama
- Created by: Song Jae-jeong
- Based on: Yumi's Cells by Lee Dong-gun
- Written by: Kim Kyung-ran; Kim Yoon-joo
- Directed by: Lee Sang-yeob
- Starring: Kim Go-eun; Ahn Bo-hyun; Park Jin-young; Kim Jae-won
- Music by: Kim Tae-seung
- Country of origin: South Korea
- Original language: Korean
- No. of seasons: 3
- No. of episodes: 36

Production
- Executive producer: Joo Moon-soo
- Producers: Jo Moon-joo; Song Jae-kwon; Kwon Mi-kyung; Jang Woo-sik; Han So-jin; Yoo Seul-gi
- Camera setup: Single-camera
- Running time: 60–71 minutes
- Production companies: Studio Dragon; Merrycow Creative; Studio N; Locus Corporation (Animation)

Original release
- Network: TVING; tvN
- Release: September 17, 2021 – May 4, 2026

Yumi's Cells (Korean: 유미의 세포들) is a 2021 South Korean television series directed by Lee Sang-yeob and starring Kim Go-eun, Ahn Bo-hyun, Park Jin-young, and Kim Jae-won. Based on the eponymous webtoon, it is a cell-based psychological romance that unravels the daily life of an ordinary office worker Yumi through the eyes of the cells in her head.

The first season was released on TVING from September 17, to October 30, 2021, and aired on tvN every Friday and Saturday at 22:50 (KST). The second season was released on TVING from June 10, to July 22, 2022, releasing two episodes every Friday at 16:00 (KST). It was later aired on tvN from November 16, to December 29, 2022, every Wednesday and Thursday at 22:30 (KST). The third season premiered on TVING on April 13, 2026, releasing two episodes every Monday at 18:00 (KST); it also aired on tvN every Monday and Tuesday at 20:50 (KST).

On September 8, 2021, TVING announced that the drama had sold broadcast rights in more than 160 countries around the world, including Europe, North America and Southeast Asia. On September 15, 2022, it was announced that season 2 had been sold to Amazon Prime Video for broadcasting in Japan.

== Series overview ==
Season	Episodes	Originally released		Time slot
Season	Episodes	First released	Last released	Time slot
1	14	September 17, 2021	October 30, 2021	Fridays and Saturdays at 22:50 (KST)
2	14	June 10, 2022	July 22, 2022	Fridays at 16:00 (KST)
3	8	April 13, 2026	May 4, 2026	Mondays at 18:00 (KST)

== Synopsis ==
The drama tells the story of an ordinary office worker from the perspective of the brain cells in her head that control her every thought, feeling and action.

=== Season 1 ===
Yumi (Kim Go-eun) is an ordinary woman whose Love Cell has fallen into a coma following the shock of a failed relationship. When she meets Goo Woong (Ahn Bo-hyun), a game developer, his simple and honest personality wakes up Yumi's Love Cell.

=== Season 2 ===
After parting with Goo Woong, Yumi starts a new relationship with her co-worker Babi (Jinyoung). In the meantime, she rekindles her dream of becoming a writer.

=== Season 3 ===
Yumi, now in her mid-30s, has become a renowned romance novelist, but she feels a sense of emptiness. The arrival of Shin Soon-rok (Kim Jae-won) plunges her life into a new mix of joy and despair.

== Cast ==
Character	Portrayed by	Season		
Character	Portrayed by	1	2	3
Main
Kim Yumi	Kim Go-eun	Main	Main	Main
Goo Woong	Ahn Bo-hyun	Main	Main	
Yoo Babi	Park Jin-young	Main	Main	
Shin Soon-rok	Kim Jae-won			Main
Recurring
Ruby	Lee Yu-bi	Recurring	Recurring	Recurring
Seo Sae-yi	Park Ji-hyun	Recurring		
Yumi's mother	Yoon Yoo-sun	Recurring	Recurring	Recurring
Baek Na-hee	Cho Hye-jung			Recurring

=== Main ===
- Kim Go-eun as Kim Yumi, an ordinary office worker.
- Ahn Bo-hyun as Goo Woong, a game developer and Yumi's second boyfriend and Sae-yi's love interest.
  - Jun Ho-young as teen Goo Woong
- Park Jin-young as Yoo Babi, Yumi's co-worker and boyfriend.
- Kim Jae-won as Shin Soon-rok, employee of a publishing company in charge of Yumi's works and eventually her husband.

=== Yumi's cells ===
- Love Cell (voice: Ahn Soi)

Yumi's prime cell that represents the people. It's the driving force behind Yumi's actions. Other cells wear blue, but it wears pink.

- Emotional Cell (voice: Park Ji-yoon)

Emotional cell, responsible for emotion. It has a nocturnal temperament, so at night, it flutters blue leaves and gets wet with sensitivity.

- Rational Cell (voice: Shim Kyu-hyuk)

The opposite cell responsible for ideal thinking. When working or having an important conversation, this is Yumi's busiest cell from the moment she wakes up to the moment she goes to sleep.

- Hungry Cell (voice: Lee Jang-won)

Cell responsible for appetite and cravings. When this cell wakes up, Yumi's appetite explodes.

- Naughty Cell (voice: Ahn Young-mi)

Clumsy sexuality cell that promotes racy thoughts. It spits out obscene words from time to time, most of which are muted.

- Detective Cell (voice: Jeong Jae-heon)

Detective cell that analyzes and predicts people and situations around it.

- Fashion Cell (voice: Kim Yeon-woo)
- Hysterious (voice: Um Sang-hyun)
- Anxiety Cell (voice: Sa Moon-yeong)
- Inner Feeling Cell (voice: Sa Moon-yeong)
- Rampage Cell (voice: Jeong Jae-heon)
- Fussy Cell (voice: Sa Moon-yeong)
- Lullaby Cell (voice: Jeong Jae-heon)
- Cheapskate Cell (voice: Ahn Soi)
- Reaction Doll No.1 (voice: Ahn Soi)
- Stomach Cell (voice: Shim Kyu-hyuk)
- Tongue Cells (voice: Yoo Se-yoon)

=== Woong's cells ===
- Rational Cell (voice: Um Sang-hyun)
- Humor Cell (voice: Jeong Jae-heon)

=== Babi's cells ===
- Tongue Cells (voice: Kang Yu-mi)

=== Supporting ===
- Park Ji-hyun as Seo Sae-yi (s. 1), Goo Woong's colleague. She dreams of becoming the best game art director.
- Lee Yu-bi as Ruby, Yumi's co-worker who prides herself on mastering various dating techniques.
- Joo Jong-hyuk as Louis (s. 1)

A game developer workaholic. Goo Woong, Seo Sae-yi, and he were college classmates, who have set up and run an online game company.

- Jeong Soon-won as Chief Nam Joo-hyuk.
- Kim Cha-yoon as Lee Bonnie, an employee of Daehan Noodles' marketing department.
- Mi-ram as Yida, Yumi's friend and her co-worker at Daehan Noodles.
- Jeon Seok-ho as Ahn Dae-young (s. 2–3), editor-in-chief of Julie's Literature History.
- Cho Hye-jung as Baek Na-hee (s. 3)

Yumi's assistant writer.

- Park Se-in as PD Jang (s. 3), Yumi's PD.
- Choi Daniel as Kim Joo-ho (s 3), the lead writer at Julie Publishing.
- Kwon Seung-woo as Kang Han-byeol (s. 2), Assistant Manager of Daehan Noodles' marketing department
- Kim Mi-soo as Ja-young (s. 2), Babi's ex-girlfriend
- Yoon Yoo-sun as Yumi's mother
- Sung Ji-ru as Yumi's father

=== Others ===
- Choi Min-ho as Chae U-gi (s. 1), Yumi's co-worker and unreciprocated crush.
- Ahn Young-mi as Nung-cheol (s. 1)
- Lee Sang-yi as Ji Wu-gi (s. 1), Yumi's ex-boyfriend.
- Shin Ye-eun as Yoo Da-eun (s. 2), part-time worker at Jeju branch of Daehan Noodles.
- Pyo Ji-hoon as Control Z (s. 2), an illustrator who works with Yumi.
- Park Bo-eun as Information desk employee (s. 1, ep. 8)
- Jung Soo-ji as Si Leon (s. 1, ep. 7–8)
- Kim Hye-in as Hong Na-ri (s. 1, ep. 7–8)
- Jo Mo-se as wedding guest (s. 1, ep. 13)
- Kang Chan-yang as grocery store cashier (s. 1, ep. 11)

== Production ==
=== Casting ===
On December 31, 2020, it was reported that webtoon Yumi's Cells published on Naver by Lee Dong-gun from 2015 to 2020 with 3.2 billion accumulated views was being made into a television series and Kim Go-eun was confirmed as the female lead. On March 10, 2021, media reported that Ahn Bo-hyun had received an offer for the part of Yu-mi's first boyfriend, Goo Woong, which was confirmed on April 27 with the final line-up, which also included Lee Yu-bi, Park Ji-hyun and Choi Min-ho.

On July 22, 2021, Jinyoung joined the cast, appearing from episode 8 onwards as Yoo Babi; in the second season the character was promoted to male lead. The second season also features special appearances by Shin Ye-eun, P.O, and Jeon Seok-ho.

The production of the third season was announced on March 31, 2025. Kim Jae-won joined the cast as Shin Soon-rok; new characters played by Choi Daniel and Cho Hye-jung were also introduced.

=== Filming and adaptation ===
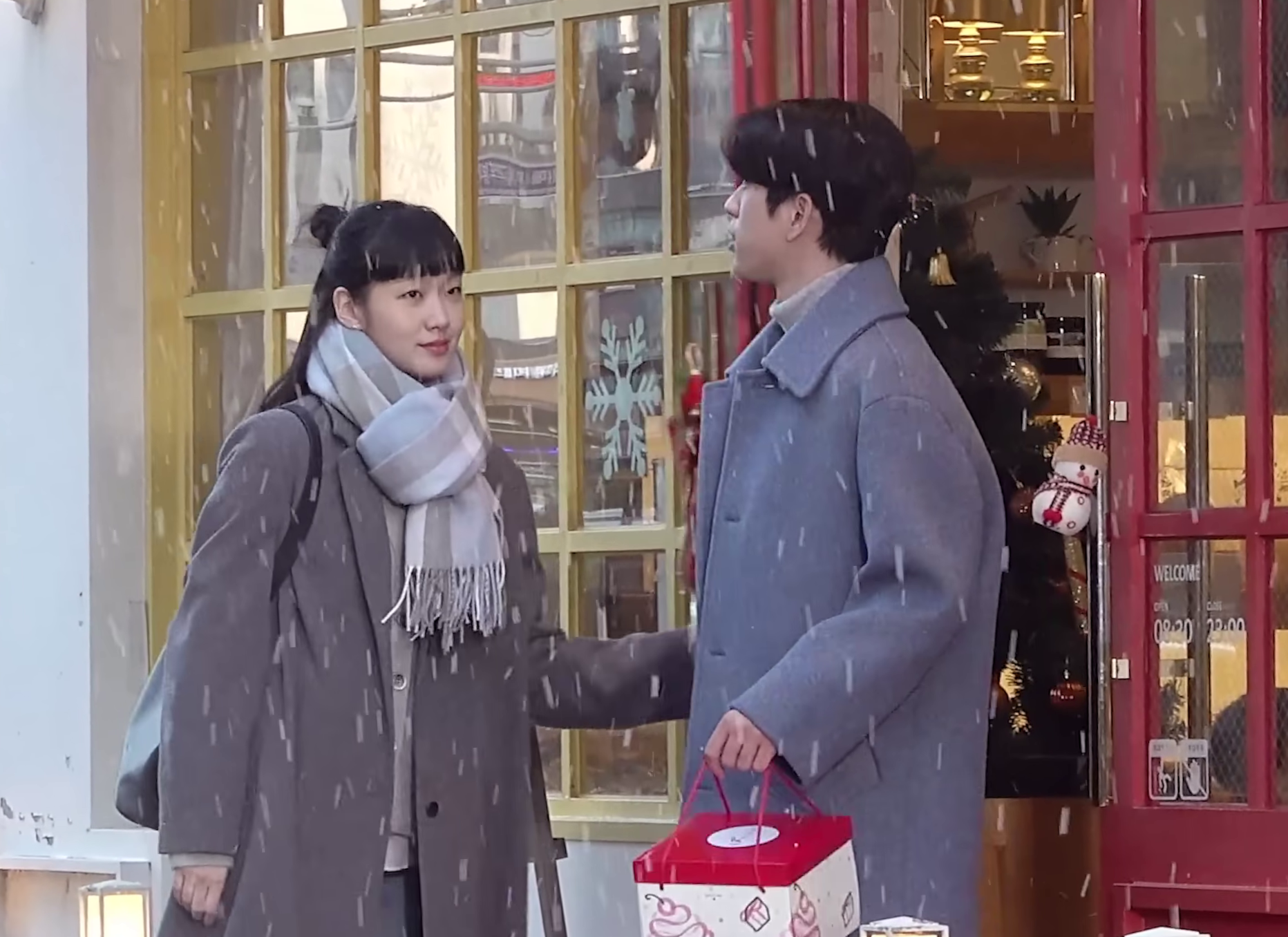
Kim Go-eun and Park Jin-young filming the second season

The first two seasons started production simultaneously. Filming began in April 2021 and ended the following December. While the first season wanted to faithfully adapt the webtoon, with the second one the director and the writers took a different approach, given the polarization of opinions on Babi by the readers of the original work. As Babi flirts with another woman while he is dating Yumi, Jinyoung commented that one of his sisters had asked him if he was really sure about accepting the part and that, with the help of the director and Kim Go-eun, he had tried to show Babi's infinite love for Yumi to try to make people hate him less. Since the third season had not yet been confirmed at the time of filming, and wanting to highlight Lee Dong-gun's creativity, the scenes of Yumi's third boyfriend, Shin Soon-rok, were therefore adapted for Babi.

Filming of the third season took place from June to October 2025. Locations included Incheon, Seoul, Suwon and Busan: of the latter, the season features the Ananti at Busan Cove resort, Bosu-dong book street, and Gamcheon village. Considering that the focus on Yumi and Soon-rok in the webtoon was minimal and that it would have been necessary to introduce conflicts not present in the original to extend the story, 8 episodes were produced instead of 14, making the third season more compact and in line with the new panorama of entertainment product consumption.

=== Animation ===
Yumi's Cells was produced using a new format which combined live-action and 3D animation. It was the first time such a format was used to produce a TV series while using the Unreal Engine as its source. The 3D animation was produced by Locus Corporation (also known as Sidus Animation Studios), the producer of Red Shoes and the Seven Dwarfs.

== Original soundtrack ==
=== Season 1 ===
Original soundtrack for Season 1

Yumi's Cells

Soundtrack album by Various
- Released: 2021
- Genre: Soundtrack
- Languages: Korean; English
- Labels: Genie Music; Stone Music Entertainment

==== Part 1 ====
Released on September 17, 2021
No.	Title	Lyrics	Music	Artist	Length
1.	"If I Could Read Your Mind" (나를 신경 쓰고 있는 건가)	Lim Soo-ho; N!ko; Strongman; Dailog	Lim Soo-ho; N!ko; Strongman; Dailog	Wendy (Red Velvet)	3:01
2.	"If I Could Read Your Mind" (나를 신경 쓰고 있는 건가) (Inst.)		Lim Soo-ho; N!ko; Strongman; Dailog		3:01
Total length:					6:02

==== Part 2 ====
Released on September 18, 2021
No.	Title	Lyrics	Music	Artist	Length
1.	"Nightfalling"	BYMORE; Ail Lee; JohnOfa Rhee	BYMORE; Ail Lee; JohnOfa Rhee	John Park	4:09
2.	"Nightfalling" (Inst.)		BYMORE; Ail Lee; JohnOfa Rhee		4:09
Total length:					8:16

==== Part 3 ====
Released on September 25, 2021
No.	Title	Lyrics	Music	Artist	Length
1.	"Ling Ling"	Jo Hyu-il	Jo Hyu-il	Jo Hyu-il	3:49
2.	"Ling Ling" (Inst.)		Jo Hyu-il		3:49
Total length:					7:38

==== Part 4 ====
Released on October 1, 2021
No.	Title	Lyrics	Music	Artist	Length
1.	"Like a Star"	YOSKE; Kim Mi-ryang	Lee Min-young; YOSKE; Yeul	Doyoung	4:00
2.	"Like a Star" (Inst.)		Lee Min-young; YOSKE; Yeul		4:00
Total length:					8:00

==== Part 5 ====
Released on October 2, 2021
No.	Title	Lyrics	Music	Artist	Length
1.	"Spotlight" (주인공)	Sanghyun Nah	Sanghyun Nah	Band Nah	4:00
2.	"My Heart" (내 마음)	Choi Soo-mi	Kim Byeong-gyu	Say Sue Me	3:30
Total length:					7:30

==== Part 6 ====
Released on October 8, 2021
No.	Title	Lyrics	Music	Artist	Length
1.	"My Day" (오늘도 내 하루는)	J.UNA	J.UNA	J.UNA	3:41
2.	"My Day" (오늘도 내 하루는)(Inst.)		J.UNA		3:41
Total length:					7:22

==== Part 7 ====
Released on October 9, 2021
No.	Title	Lyrics	Music	Artist	Length
1.	"Belief"	Jehwi; Kim Dam-so; Su2	Jehwi	Jung Seung-hwan	4:53
2.	"Belief" (Inst.)		Jehwi		4:53
Total length:					9:46

==== Part 8 ====
Released on October 15, 2021
No.	Title	Lyrics	Music	Artist	Length
1.	"Our Story" (우리의 이야기)	Kim Min-seok	MeloMance	MeloMance	3:59
2.	"Our Story" (우리의 이야기(Inst.)		MeloMance		3:59
Total length:					7:58

==== Part 9 ====
Released on October 16, 2021
No.	Title	Lyrics	Music	Artist	Length
1.	"I'm in Paris"	Kako	Kako, Curtis F	Dvwn	2:35
2.	"I'm in Paris" (Inst.)		Kako, Curtis F		2:35
Total length:					5:10

==== Part 10 ====
Released on October 22, 2021
No.	Title	Lyrics	Music	Artist	Length
1.	"Holiday"	Jehwi; Su2	Jehwi	Jehwi	3:56
2.	"Holiday" (Inst.)		Jehwi		3:56
Total length:					7:52

==== Part 11 ====
Released on October 23, 2021
No.	Title	Lyrics	Music	Artist	Length
1.	"Timing" (타이밍)	Sunwoo Jung-a	Sunwoo Jung-a	Sunwoo Jung-a	3:53
2.	"Timing" (Inst.)		Sunwoo Jung-a		3:53
Total length:					7:46

=== Season 2 ===
Original soundtrack for Season 2

Yumi's Cells Season 2

Soundtrack album by Various
- Released: 2022
- Genre: Soundtrack
- Languages: Korean; English
- Labels: Genie Music; Stone Music Entertainment

==== Part 1 ====
Released on June 10, 2022
No.	Title	Lyrics	Music	Artist	Length
1.	"About You"	Yokse; Daymoon (ALive Knob); Ile (ALive Knob); JL (ALive Knob)	Yokse; Iver (ALive Knob)	Woodz	3:15
2.	"About You" (Inst.)		Yokse; Iver (ALive Knob)		3:15
Total length:					6:30

==== Part 2 ====
Released on June 17, 2022
No.	Title	Lyrics	Music	Artist	Length
1.	"Everyday"	Son Go-eun (MonoTree)	Son Go-eun (MonoTree); Nopari	George	3:44
2.	"Everyday" (Inst.)		Son Go-eun (MonoTree); Nopari		3:44
Total length:					7:28

==== Part 3 ====
Released on June 24, 2022
No.	Title	Lyrics	Music	Artist	Length
1.	"Shining on Your Night" (달이 될게)	$ÜN; Rudbeckia; Lee Yumi	$ÜN; Rudbeckia; Park Jae-hyung	Jinyoung	3:42
2.	"Shining on Your Night" (달이 될게; Inst.)		$ÜN; Rudbeckia; Park Jae-hyung		3:42
Total length:					7:24

==== Part 4 ====
Released on July 1, 2022
No.	Title	Lyrics	Music	Artist	Length
1.	"My Day" (오늘도 내 하루는; Acoustic Ver.)	J.Una	J.Una	J.Una	4:12
2.	"My Day" (오늘도 내 하루는; Acoustic Ver.; Inst.)		J.Una		4:12
Total length:					8:24

==== Part 5 ====
Released on July 2, 2022
No.	Title	Lyrics	Music	Artist	Length
1.	"Between Hearts" (마음 사이)	88KEYS	88KEYS	Ku One-chan	3:26
2.	"Between Hearts" (마음 사이; Inst.)		88KEYS		3:26
Total length:					6:52

==== Part 6 ====
Released on July 8, 2022
No.	Title	Lyrics	Music	Artist	Length
1.	"Where My Heart Falls" (내 마음 내리는 곳에)	Vendors (CALi); Jeong Jae-yeon	Vendors (YEZI); Vendors(CALi); Vendors (Fascinador)	Kevin Oh	4:08
2.	"Where My Heart Falls" (내 마음 내리는 곳에; Inst.)		Vendors (YEZI); Vendors(CALi); Vendors (Fascinador)		4:08
Total length:					8:16

==== Part 7 ====
Released on July 15, 2022
No.	Title	Lyrics	Music	Artist	Length
1.	"The Island" (섬)	88KEYS	88KEYS	88KEYS	4:00
2.	"The Island" (섬; Inst.)		88KEYS		4:00
Total length:					8:00

==== Part 8 ====
Released on July 16, 2022
No.	Title	Lyrics	Music	Artist	Length
1.	"Dark Hearts Will Pass Away Tonight" (어두운 마음은 오늘 밤 지나갈거야)	Kim Yoon-ju	Kim Yoon-ju	Kim Go-eun	3:20
2.	"Dark Hearts Will Pass Away Tonight" (어두운 마음은 오늘 밤 지나갈거야; Inst.)		Kim Yoon-ju		3:20
Total length:					6:40

=== Season 3 ===
Original soundtrack for Season 3

Yumi's Cells Season 3

Soundtrack album by Various
- Released: 2026
- Genre: Soundtrack
- Languages: Korean; English
- Labels: Studio Dragon; Stone Music Entertainment

==== Part 1 ====
Released on April 14, 2026
No.	Title	Lyrics	Music	Artist	Length
1.	"If I Could Read Your Mind (2026 Ver.)" (나를 신경 쓰고 있는 건가 (2026 Ver.))	Imsuho; N!ko; Dundunman; Dailog	Imsuho; N!ko; Dundunman; Dailog	So Soo-bin	3:01
2.	"If I Could Read Your Mind (2026 Ver.)" (나를 신경 쓰고 있는 건가 (2026 Ver.); Inst.)		Imsuho; N!ko; Dundunman; Dailog		3:01
Total length:					6:02

==== Part 2 ====
Released on April 20, 2026
No.	Title	Lyrics	Music	Artist	Length
1.	"Spotlight (2026 Ver.)" (주인공 (2026 Ver.))	Sanghyun Nah	Sanghyun Nah	Shin In Ryu	3:58
2.	"Spotlight (2026 Ver.)" (주인공 (2026 Ver.); Inst.)		Sanghyun Nah		3:58
Total length:					7:56

==== Part 3 ====
Released on April 21, 2026
No.	Title	Lyrics	Music	Artist	Length
1.	"Let It Show"	Flum3N	Flum3N; Iris (MonoTree); HeavenW; Minn	Han	3:18
2.	"Let It Show" (Inst.)		Flum3N; Iris (MonoTree); HeavenW; Minn		3:18
Total length:					6:36

==== Part 4 ====
Released on April 28, 2026
No.	Title	Lyrics	Music	Artist	Length
1.	"Shooting Star" (유성)	4bout	4bout; Himo; Addicted; Echez; Hwan	Thama	3:43
2.	"Shooting Star" (유성; Inst.)		4bout; Himo; Addicted; Echez; Hwan		3:43
3.	"Into My Life"	Jenny Jun	Jenny Jun	Junny	4:04
4.	"Into My Life" (Inst.)		Jenny Jun		4:04
Total length:					15:34

==== Part 5 ====
Released on May 5, 2026
No.	Title	Lyrics	Music	Artist	Length
1.	"Close to Me"	Yoske (Balcony Swim)	Yoske (Balcony Swim); Choi Soo-hwan (Balcony Swim); Hove (Balcony Swim)	Anton	3:30
2.	"Close to Me" (Inst.)		Yoske (Balcony Swim); Choi Soo-hwan (Balcony Swim); Hove (Balcony Swim)		3:30
Total length:					7:00

== Reception ==
=== Critical reception ===
Yumi's Cells has been praised for its refreshing and humorous depiction of the daily life of an ordinary office worker, and for giving central importance to Yumi's growth, representing her life, choices and emotional changes over a long period of time. Kim Go-eun's performance was deemed a massive and solid pivot who firmly held the narrative and emotional arc together throughout the whole series.

The first season was praised for its casting, the actors' performances, the faithful adaptation of the webtoon, and the use of 3D animation to depict the cells, although some critics stated that the relatively new attempt to integrate live action and animation could be a barrier for those who were not already fans of the original work. This latter reason was cited as the likely cause of the ratings, which were considered disappointing for its quality.

Yumi's Cells 2 was praised for its greater maturity and evolution in the actors' performances, and was ranked 7th in the best series of 2022 by Cine21, which praised it for not losing its momentum and for realistically weaving together character growth and romance. Indiatoday applauded the chemistry between Kim Go-eun and Jinyoung, but felt that Babi's character had been poorly handled, especially in the second half.

The third season was praised for introducing different situations and relationships than the webtoon without sacrificing its freshness, such as the initial hostile relationship between Yumi and Soon-rok, or the Tower of Principles in the last episode. Critics noted that, despite its short length due to the scarce source material and the not particularly special story, the season was solid, brilliant and well-executed. The audience also directed compliments to Kim Jae-won's performance.

=== Viewership ===
After the release of the first two episodes of the second season, TVING recorded the highest number of paying subscribers of any of its original dramas, quadrupling the number of subscribers since the premiere of the previous season. They increased by more than 60% from the first to the second week, and the series took first place among all the platform original contents for five weeks in a row.

TVING saw a spike in paying users after the release of the first two episodes of the third season, while episode 1 achieved over 2% in TV ratings and was the most-watched program in its time slot. It held the first spot on TVING and in the ratings for three consecutive weeks, as well as being number one in 81 countries on Rakuten Viki, and in the top 3 on Disney+ in Japan. On the Mongolian platform Inche TV, the third season attracted 1,678 new subscribers and recorded more than 270,000 views in its first week. Despite the low ratings in its home country, it was considered a success for attracting new viewers and generating sufficient buzz.

Yumi's Cells : South Korea viewers per episode (thousands)

Season	Episode number														Average
Season	1	2	3	4	5	6	7	8	9	10	11	12	13	14	Average
1	521	616	538	823	654	753	658	714	832	783	528	739	617	769	681
2	320	343	N/A	N/A	272	255	299	N/A	269	N/A	270	291	267	247	N/A
3	554	388	589	445	588	522	549	717	–						544

Source: Audience measurement performed nationwide by Nielsen Korea.

==== Season 1 ====
Average TV viewership ratings (season 1)
Ep.	Original broadcast date	Average audience share (Nielsen Korea)	
Ep.	Original broadcast date	Nationwide	Seoul
1	September 17, 2021	2.072% (2nd)	2.386% (2nd)
2	September 18, 2021	2.390% (2nd)	2.564% (3rd)
3	September 24, 2021	1.871% (2nd)	2.323% (2nd)
4	September 25, 2021	2.545% (3rd)	3.301% (2nd)
5	October 1, 2021	2.036% (2nd)	2.333% (1st)
6	October 2, 2021	2.384% (3rd)	2.889% (2nd)
7	October 8, 2021	2.089% (3rd)	2.458% (3rd)
8	October 9, 2021	2.093% (3rd)	2.235% (3rd)
9	October 15, 2021	2.660% (2nd)	3.089% (2nd)
10	October 16, 2021	2.312% (4th)	2.700% (2nd)
11	October 22, 2021	1.906% (3rd)	2.341% (2nd)
12	October 23, 2021	2.340% (3rd)	2.965% (3rd)
13	October 29, 2021	2.037% (2nd)	2.590% (2nd)
14	October 30, 2021	2.485% (2nd)	2.828% (2nd)
Average		2.230%	2.643%
In the table above, the blue numbers represent the lowest ratings and the red numbers represent the highest ratings.; This drama airs on a cable channel/pay TV which normally has a relatively smaller audience compared to free-to-air TV/public broadcasters (KBS, SBS, MBC and EBS).

==== Season 2 ====
Average TV viewership ratings (season 2)
Ep.	Original broadcast date	Average audience share (Nielsen Korea)	
Ep.	Original broadcast date	Nationwide	Seoul
1	November 16, 2022	1.379% (4th)	1.483% (4th)
2	November 17, 2022	1.384% (7th)	1.415% (6th)
3	November 23, 2022	1.047% (15th)	N/A
4	November 24, 2022	0.730% (30th)	N/A
5	November 30, 2022	1.326% (7th)	1.170% (8th)
6	December 1, 2022	1.068% (14th)	N/A
7	December 7, 2022	1.359% (4th)	1.414% (5th)
8	December 8, 2022	1.133% (9th)	1.259% (7th)
9	December 14, 2022	1.247% (8th)	N/A
10	December 15, 2022	1.253% (8th)	1.584% (5th)
11	December 21, 2022	1.246% (11th)	N/A
12	December 22, 2022	1.307% (9th)	1.586% (4th)
13	December 28, 2022	1.204% (11th)	N/A
14	December 29, 2022	1.168% (12th)	N/A
Average		1.204%	— (Note: Due to some ratings not recorded, the exact average rating is unknown.)
In the table above, the blue numbers represent the lowest ratings and the red numbers represent the highest ratings.; N/A denotes that ratings were not known.; This drama airs on a cable channel/pay TV which normally has a relatively smaller audience compared to free-to-air TV/public broadcasters (KBS, SBS, MBC and EBS).

==== Season 3 ====
Average TV viewership ratings (season 3)
Ep.	Original broadcast date	Average audience share (Nielsen Korea)	
Ep.	Original broadcast date	Nationwide	Seoul
1	April 13, 2026	2.252% (2nd)	2.544% (2nd)
2	April 14, 2026	1.737% (5th)	2.030% (3rd)
3	April 20, 2026	2.263% (2nd)	2.460% (2nd)
4	April 21, 2026	1.920% (4th)	2.170% (3rd)
5	April 27, 2026	2.310% (2nd)	2.798% (2nd)
6	April 28, 2026	2.028% (2nd)	2.372% (2nd)
7	May 4, 2026	2.107% (2nd)	2.199% (2nd)
8	May 5, 2026	2.496% (2nd)	2.870% (2nd)
Average		2.139%	2.430%
In the table above, the blue numbers represent the lowest ratings and the red numbers represent the highest ratings.; This drama aired on a cable channel/pay TV which normally has a relatively smaller audience compared to free-to-air TV/public broadcasters (KBS, SBS, MBC and EBS).

== Awards and nominations ==
Name of the award ceremony, year presented, category, nominee of the award, and the result of the nomination
Award ceremony	Year	Category	Nominee	Result	Ref.
APAN Star Awards	2022	Top Excellence Award, Actress in an OTT Series	Kim Go-eun	Nominated	
APAN Star Awards	2022	Excellence Award, Actor in an OTT Series	Ahn Bo-hyun	Won	
APAN Star Awards	2022	Best Couple	Park Jin-young and Kim Go-eun	Nominated	
APAN Star Awards	2022	Popularity Star Award, Actress	Kim Go-eun	Nominated	
Asia-Pacific Broadcasting+ Awards	2023	Excellence Award for Animation Story Telling	Yumi's Cells (s. 2)	Won	
Asian Academy Creative Awards	2022	Best Original Programme by a Streamer/OTT (Korea)	Yumi's Cells (s. 1–2)	Won	
Asian Academy Creative Awards	2022	Grand Award for Best Original Programme by a Streamer/OTT	Yumi's Cells (s. 1–2)	Won	(Note: National winners automatically compete with the winners from other countries for the Grand Award.)
Baeksang Arts Awards	2022	Baeksang Arts Technical Award (Animation)	Eom Young-shik and Kim Da-hee	Nominated	
Blue Dragon Series Awards	2022	Best Drama	Yumi's Cells	Nominated	
Blue Dragon Series Awards	2022	Best Leading Actress	Kim Go-eun	Won	
Blue Dragon Series Awards	2026	Best New Actor	Kim Jae-won	Pending	
Blue Dragon Series Awards	2026	Best Drama	Yumi's Cells (s. 3)	Pending	
Korea Communications Commission Broadcasting Awards	2023	Excellence Award in the OTT/Web/App Content Category	Yumi's Cells (s. 2)	Won	

=== Listicle ===
Name of publisher, year listed, name of listicle, and placement
Publisher	Year	Listicle	Placement	Ref.
NME	2021	The 10 best Korean dramas of 2021	5th	
