= Train (TV series) =

2020 South Korean television series

- Promotional poster
- Hangul: 트레인
- RR: Teurein
- MR: T'ŭrein
- Genre: Fantasy; Mystery; Thriller
- Created by: Studio Dragon
- Written by: Park Ga-yeon
- Directed by: Ryu Seung-jin
- Starring: Yoon Shi-yoon; Kyung Soo-jin; Shin So-yul
- Country of origin: South Korea
- Original language: Korean
- No. of episodes: 12

Production
- Running time: 60 minutes
- Production company: doFRAME

Original release
- Network: OCN
- Release: July 11 – August 17, 2020

Train (Korean: 트레인) is a South Korean television series starring Yoon Shi-yoon, Kyung Soo-jin and Shin So-yul. It aired on OCN from July 11 to August 17, 2020, every Saturday and Sunday at 22:30 (KST).

== Synopsis ==
A hard-hitting detective who fearlessly dives into his work, Seo Do-won (Yoon Shi-yoon) is relentless when it comes to bringing criminals to justice. Willing to take on any case, no matter how hard, Do-won has made a name for himself as a man who gets the job done. But when the woman he loves becomes the latest victim of a serial killer, his world completely changes.

Mysteriously able to move between parallel universes, Do-won now lives in both worlds as a man who must pay for the sins of his father in one, and as a man forced to live a precarious life because of those sins in the other. As if the duality of his life wasn't hard enough to deal with, he soon learns that his deceased love may be gone in one world, but she's very much alive in the other. Vowing to track down her killer in one universe, while simultaneously trying to protect her in the other, Do-won is quick to acknowledge this is not something he can do alone.

Seeking the help of his colleagues in both universes, Do-won asks Han Seo-kyung (Kyung Soo-jin), an honest, yet reserved prosecutor with a big heart in one world, and a cold and emotionless detective in the other, to help him out. Together with Lee Jung-min (Shin So-yul), a tenacious member of the scientific investigation unit, they'll do whatever it takes to track down the killer in one world and protect his love in the other.

== Cast ==
=== Main ===
- Yoon Shi-yoon as Seo Do-won
  - Lee Min-jae as young Seo Do-won

A police officer on the path of atonement in universe "A" and a senior police inspector who has chosen the path of corruption in universe "B".

- Kyung Soo-jin as Han Seo-kyung
  - Im Chae-hyun as young Han Seo-kyung

An honest, straight-talking prosecutor in universe "A" and a cold, emotionless detective in universe "B". She searches for the truth after finding out about the death of her father.

- Shin So-yul as Lee Jung-min

A forensic inspector in both universes but Do-won's best friend in universe "A" and Do-won's first love and ex-girlfriend in universe "B".

=== Supporting ===
- Lee Hang-na as Oh Mi-sook

Police chief who took care of Do-won and Seo-kyung in universe "A". A police chief with hidden agenda in universe "B".

- Choi Seung-yoon as Dr. Seok Min-joon

A psychiatrist in universe "B" who treats Seo-kyung.

- Jo Wan-ki as Woo Jae-hyuk

A detective in Do-won's team in both universes.

- Kim Dong-young as Kim Jin-woo

A detective in Do-won's team in universe "A" and an ex-convict in universe "B".

- Baek Jae-woo as Kang Joon-young

A junior detective in Do-won's team in universe "B".

==== Han Seo-kyung's family ====
- Kim Jin-seo as Han Kyu-tae

Seo-kyung's father and the murder victim.

- Cha Yup as Lee Sung-wook
  - Kim Yoo-chan as young Lee Sung-wook

Han Seo-kyung's disabled step-brother in universe "A" and a gang member in universe "B".

- Yoon Bok-in as Jo Young-ran

Seo-kyung's step-mother and Sung-wook mother.

==== Seo Do-won's family ====
- Nam Moon-cheol as Seo Jae-cheol

Do-won's father who died in universe "A" and is alive and convicted of Han Kyu-tae's murder in universe "B".

=== Others ===
- Chang Ryul as Park Tae-kyung
- Kwon Han-sol as Lee Ji-young
- Jang Yool as Park Tae-kyung
- Kim Bi-bi as NFS examiner
- Park Jung-won as Park Min-kyung
- Jang Hae-song as Lee Jin-sung

== Viewership ==
Average TV viewership ratings
| Ep. | Original broadcast date | Average audience share (Nielsen Korea) |
| Ep. | Original broadcast date | Nationwide |
|---|---|---|
| 1 | July 11, 2020 | 1.367% |
| 2 | July 12, 2020 | 1.443% |
| 3 | July 18, 2020 | 0.994% |
| 4 | July 19, 2020 | 1.3% |
| 5 | July 25, 2020 | 0.997% |
| 6 | July 26, 2020 | 1.410% |
| 7 | August 1, 2020 | 1.394% |
| 8 | August 2, 2020 | 1.297% |
| 9 | August 8, 2020 | 1.107% |
| 10 | August 9, 2020 | 1.406% |
| 11 | August 15, 2020 | 1.172% |
| 12 | August 16, 2020 | 1.426% |
| Average | | 1.276% |
The blue numbers represent the lowest ratings and the red numbers represent the highest ratings.; N/A denotes that the rating is not known.; This drama aired on a cable channel/pay TV which normally has a relatively smaller audience compared to free-to-air TV/public broadcasters (KBS, SBS, MBC and EBS).

== International broadcast ==
The series is available on iQIYI with multi-languages subtitles in South East Asia and Taiwan, Rakuten Viki in selected regions, and in the United Kingdom and Republic of Ireland via Sky Sci-fi and NOW.

== Remake ==
BBC Studios' Firebird Pictures has obtained the remake rights to the series, to be adapted for British television.
