= Sportschosun =

South Korean sports and entertainment daily newspaper

- Type: Daily newspaper
- Owner(s): Sportschosun Co., Ltd.
- Founder: Bang Woo-young
- Founded: 21 March 1990; 36 years ago
- Language: Korean
- Headquarters: Seoul, South Korea
- City: Seoul
- Country: South Korea
- Circulation: 219,531 total; 178,409 paid (2015)
- Website: www.sportschosun.com

Sportschosun (Korean: 스포츠조선, sometimes rendered Sports Chosun) is a South Korean daily newspaper covering sports and entertainment. It was founded in 1990 by Bang Woo-young, an executive of The Chosun Ilbo who later served as honorary chairman of the newspaper company.

== History ==
Sportschosun was launched on 21 March 1990. A 2019 study of Korean sports newspapers discussed Sportschosun as part of the expansion and later competition of South Korea's sports-newspaper market.

In an article on the competition among South Korean sports newspapers, Shin Dong-a reported that Sportschosun entered the market in March 1990 and attempted to differentiate itself through expanded entertainment coverage and comics sections. The article described Sportschosun, Sports Seoul and Ilgan Sports as forming a relatively stable three-way competition before the launch of Sports Today in 1999.

== Content and market position ==
Sportschosun developed within a market in which South Korean sports newspapers combined sports reporting with entertainment, leisure and serialized comics. Shin Dong-a reported that Sportschosun's entry into the market in 1990 contributed to intensified competition among South Korean sports newspapers and that the newspaper used entertainment coverage and comics sections as part of its differentiation strategy. A 2004 article in Cine21 also noted that the launch of Sportschosun turned the sports-newspaper comics market into a three-way competition and helped expand comics as a major feature of sports newspapers.

== Circulation ==
In 2015, figures certified by the Korea Audit Bureau of Circulations and reported by Newsis listed Sportschosun first among South Korean sports newspapers, with total circulation of 219,531 copies and paid circulation of 178,409 copies. In 2018, The Dong-A Ilbo reported that Sports Dong-a had surpassed Sportschosun in sports-newspaper paid circulation; the same report listed Sportschosun with 107,339 paid copies and total circulation of 135,275 copies.

== Awards ceremonies ==
Sportschosun is associated with the Blue Dragon Film Awards, a South Korean film awards ceremony that resumed in 1990 with Sportschosun as organizer. In 2022, Sportschosun organized the first Blue Dragon Series Awards, an awards ceremony for drama and entertainment programs released on over-the-top streaming platforms.

== See also ==
- List of newspapers in South Korea
- Blue Dragon Film Awards
- Blue Dragon Series Awards
