= If Wishes Could Kill =

2026 South Korean television series

- Promotional poster
- Hangul: 기리고
- Lit.: To Honor and... / To Commemorate and... (Note: Derived from the verb girida (기리다), which is traditionally used to respectfully praise the virtues of the deceased or celebrate a legacy. In the context of the drama, this title serves as a dark irony; while the "Girigo" app "honors" a user's wish, the term typically associated with funeral rites suggests that the cost of the wish is the user's own life. Furthermore, the title phonetically mirrors the Korean word for "and" (그리고; geurigo), subtly implying an inescapable, ritualistic chain of wishes and their lethal consequences.)
- RR: Girigo
- MR: Kirigo
- Genre: Young adult; Horror; Supernatural; Mystery
- Written by: Park Joong-seop
- Directed by: Park Youn-seo
- Starring: Jeon So-young; Kang Mi-na; Baek Sun-ho; Hyun Woo-seok; Lee Hyo-je
- Country of origin: South Korea
- Original language: Korean
- No. of episodes: 8

Production
- Running time: 36–52 minutes
- Production companies: CJ ENM Studios; Kairos Makers

Original release
- Network: Netflix
- Release: April 24, 2026

If Wishes Could Kill (Korean: 기리고) is a 2026 South Korean young adult horror television series written by Park Joong-seop, directed by Park Youn-seo and starring Jeon So-young, Kang Mi-na, Baek Sun-ho, Hyun Woo-seok, and Lee Hyo-je. The series follows five high school students who must uncover the truth behind "Girigo", a mysterious wish-granting application after it begins predicting their sudden deaths. It was released on Netflix on April 24, 2026.

== Synopsis ==
At Seorin High School, a group of students discover "Girigo", a mobile application that claims to grant users' wishes. Following the sudden death of a classmate, a connection is discovered between the application and a series of supernatural omens predicting the deaths of other students. Yoo Se-ah, Lim Na-ri, Kim Geon-woo, Kang Ha-joon, and Choi Hyeong-wook attempt to stop the cycle of deaths by investigating the app's origins.

== Cast and characters ==
=== Main ===
- Jeon So-young as Yoo Se-ah, a track and field student-athlete at Seorin High School who's suspicious about the Girigo app.
  - Kim Gyu-ram as young Se-ah
- Kang Mi-na as Lim Na-ri, a popular student at Seorin High School who originally doubts the rumors regarding the Girigo's negative reputation due to being in denial after having made a drunken wish.
  - Jung Cho-ha as young Na-ri
- Baek Sun-ho as Kim Geon-woo, a student at Seorin High School who is in a secret relationship with Se-ah and use the Girigo app.
  - Lee Si-on as young Geon-woo
- Hyun Woo-seok as Kang Ha-joon, a student who uses his programming knowledge to analyze the Girigo's software.
  - Lee Joo-won as young Ha-joon
- Lee Hyo-je as Choi Hyeong-wook, a student whose circumstances change after using the Girigo to make a wish
  - Kim Min-ho as young Hyeong-wook

=== Supporting ===
- Cha Hee as Yoo Ji-sun, Se-ah's aunt who is a doctor and took care of her after her parents passed away
- Jo Wan-ki as a homeroom teacher
- Yoon Sa-bong as Coach Song, the track and field coach at Seorin High School
- Park Tae-rin as Lee Dong-jae, a member of coding club at Seorin High School who thought the idea of the Girigo app
- Sim Su-bin as Yang Hee-jin, member of coding club at Seorin High School and Na-ri's acquaintance
- Lim Dong-yoon as the elevator man
- Yun Ki-chang as a detective
- Jo Young-ji as Se-ah's mother
- Jung Chung-min as Se-ah's father
- Lee Dong-yong as a taxi driver
- Lee Seung-jun as Min-soo, Hyeong-wook's online friend on Discord who introduced the Girigo app to him
- Choi Soo-min as a neighborhood small store owner
- Park Soo-oh as Han Gi-tae, a member of coding club at Seorin High School
- Park Chung-sun as a taxi driver

=== Special appearances ===
- Jeon So-nee as Haetsal / Kang Ha-young, Ha-joon's sister and a shaman who uncovers the curse of the Girigo app and helps the students
- Roh Jae-won as Bangwool, Haetsal's partner who is also a shaman and together with the students investigates the supernatural origins of the Girigo app
- Lee Sang-hee as Eop-soon, Si-won's mother, a shaman and an alcoholic
- Kim Si-a as Do Hye-ryung, Si-won's friend who first uses the Girigo app to wish everyone's death and commits suicide by slitting her own throat
- Choi Ju-eun as Kwon Si-won, the developer of Girigo app and the real cause of the application's curse. She is Eop-soon's daughter.

== Episodes ==
No.	Original release date
1	April 26, 2026
Years ago, a student named Do Hye-ryung filmed her suicide at an abandoned factory using the Girigo app, wishing for the death of everyone after carving her name and birth date into the wall. In the present, track athlete Yoo Se-ah and her friends—Geon-woo, Na-ri, Hyeong-wook, and Ha-joon—attend Seorin High School. Life takes a dark turn when Hyeong-wook, typically an average student, achieves a perfect math score. He reveals he made a wish on the Girigo app, which requires users to record themselves after ritualistically inscribing their personal details. While his friends remain skeptical, a 24-hour countdown appears on Hyeong-wook's phone. Tensions rise when Hyeong-wook receives a ghostly call where he hears his friends mocking him, despite Se-ah being at track practice during the alleged call. Geon-woo, seeking a way for the group to celebrate Hyeong-wook's birthday, jokingly wishes for Se-ah's training to be canceled. The next morning, Hyeong-wook behaves erratically before slitting his throat with a penknife in front of Se-ah. As she attempts to stop the bleeding, the timer on his phone hits zero and he dies.
2	April 26, 2026
Following Hyeong-wook's death, Se-ah is horrified when her training is cancelled—the exact outcome of Geon-woo's wish. A 24-hour countdown appears on Geon-woo’s phone, mirroring the late Hyeong-wook's experience. Realizing the Girigo app is a lethal reality, the friends attempt to investigate, with Na-ri appearing to not believe it at all, but the application proves impossible to delete. At Se-ah's home, Geon-woo begins acting erratically, exhibiting the same self-harming behavior as Hyeong-wook, while being filmed by Na-ri. He attacks Ha-joon and Se-ah before being knocked unconscious and rushed to the ICU. While Ha-joon attempts to crack the app's code, his sister—a shaman named Haetsal—calls with a dire warning to avoid the app before warning him Se-ah is in danger. As Geon-woo's condition turns critical at the hospital, a desperate Se-ah makes a wish on the Girigo app to save his life. The wish is granted: Geon-woo's condition stabilizes and his countdown timer stops. However, the reprieve confirms that Se-ah has now officially entered the app's deadly cycle. Meanwhile, Na-ri discovers the frozen timer back at the apartment, confirming the supernatural rules of the app have claimed another participant.
3	April 26, 2026
Ha-joon takes Se-ah to his sister's mountain home for protection. The danger is immediate as Se-ah receives a deceptive call from a spirit masquerading as Geon-woo and begins falling into a self-harming trance. To save her, Haetsal and her partner Bangwool initiate a ritual, sending Se-ah's soul into a supernatural dimension. Haetsal warns her that she must find the exit and never look back. Inside the vision, Se-ah is forced to relive Hyeong-wook's suicide and her own parents' fatal car accident. The malevolent spirit takes the form of her dying mother to coerce her into staying, but Se-ah resists. However, just as she reaches the threshold, she is tricked by a false reality and turns around. Haetsal intervenes, entering the spiritual realm to pull Se-ah back to safety. Though she survives, the curse remains. Haetsal deduces that the Girigo app is powered by a "maehyung", a root object acting as the source of the evil. To break the cycle and save Se-ah, they must locate and destroy a mysterious red phone seen in Se-ah's visions.
4	April 26, 2026
After a nightmare involving two female ghosts, Se-ah, Ha-joon, and Bangwool hunt for the maehyung. Their investigation leads them to the history of two students, Do Hye-ryung and Kwon Si-won, who died years earlier. Following a ghostly apparition to Hye-ryung's abandoned home, they uncover a photo of the girls that links back to the spirit realm. To locate the app's server, the trio sneaks into school to access Coach Song's computer. There, they discover a video showing a drunken Na-ri wishing for the deaths of Hyeong-wook and another friend of hers. Because Na-ri is still alive long after the 24-hour window, Se-ah and Ha-joon realize she had bypassed the app's lethal rules by passing the curse to the next person. Meanwhile, a recovered Geon-woo escapes the hospital and reunites with Na-ri. The two sneak onto the school grounds just as the trio uncovers Na-ri's secret. The mystery deepens as the connection between the past suicides and the current cycle converges at the school, where the metadata suggests the Girigo videos are being managed from within.
5	April 26, 2026
Flashbacks reveal that Na-ri made her wish while being goaded by a senior. When both Hyeong-wook and the senior died, Na-ri learned the Girigo app was originally a cyberbullying tool created to torment Hye-ryung. Na-ri is revealed to have been in denial in previous episodes, and later deduces that the lethal countdowns are paused only when a new person makes a wish, effectively passing the curse to Geon-woo, then to Se-ah. The spirit of Si-won, Hye-ryung’s friend, exploits Na-ri's guilt and her hidden resentment toward Se-ah. Posing as Se-ah via text, the spirit isolates Na-ri, eventually possessing her. In the school infirmary, Geon-woo finds a medical report of Si-won's facial injuries and recognizes her as the ghost that attacked him. The possessed Na-ri confronts Geon-woo before fleeing. As Geon-woo gives chase, Si-won's vengeful spirit attacks him, but Bangwool intervenes and saves his life. Meanwhile, oblivious to the possession, Ha-joon and Se-ah successfully download the server's video data. The realization dawns that the cycle of death is fueled by a chain of desperate wishes, and Na-ri has become the vessel for a spirit seeking retribution for the school's past cruelty.
6	April 26, 2026
Years ago, best friends Hye-ryung and Si-won were torn apart by a conflict involving shamanism. Si-won, the actual daughter of a shaman, loathed her heritage, while Hye-ryung was drawn to it. In a fit of rage, Si-won desecrated the religious artifacts in her mother's house, accidentally unleashing a dark force. After finding out, Si-won's mother desperately performed a ritual to protect her daughter and instructed Hye-ryung to secretly place an amulet on Si-won. At school, Hye-ryung was caught trying to do so by Si-won, who became furious and later publicly humiliated Hye-ryung by showing everyone the video of Hye-ryung's confession to Han Gi-tae. It is also revealed that Si-won told Gi-tae to physically hurt Hye-ryung to destroy her reputation. Broken by this betrayal, Hye-ryung used the Girigo app—originally Si-won's school project—to enact a lethal puppet ritual taught to her by Si-won's mother. Before taking her own life, she filmed a wish for the deaths of Si-won and Gi-tae. The curse manifested with efficiency; despite their attempts to delete the app and destroy the evidence of their bullying, both Si-won and Gi-tae died gruesome deaths exactly as Hye-ryung wished. This original sin transformed the app into a vessel for vengeful spirits, fueled by the blood of the shaman's family and the weight of a murderous grudge.
7	April 26, 2026
In the present, a possessed Na-ri attacks Ha-joon and Se-ah inside the school hall, fracturing Ha-joon's arm. Bangwool, despite being injured in the eye by Si-won, saves them and fights off Na-ri with a ritual sword. After receiving treatment, the group traces Hye-ryung's wish location to the abandoned factory where she died. On the way, the spirit attempts to run them over with a truck. Bangwool is seriously wounded while protecting Se-ah, leaving Se-ah and Geon-woo to find the factory alone while Ha-joon calls for an ambulance. The couple reaches the location and discovers Hye-ryung's broken phone, but they are ambushed by Na-ri. Geon-woo is forced to stab her with the ritual sword, allowing Na-ri to momentarily regain her senses before Si-won re-possesses her. Subsequently, Se-ah suffers a seizure caused by Si-won. A phone call, seemingly from Haetsal, instructs Geon-woo to bring Se-ah back to her house immediately, but Se-ah claims that it is a lie.
8	April 26, 2026
Se-ah awakens in a false reality within the spirit dimension and is again attacked by the possessed Na-ri. In the real world, it is revealed that the spirit compass given to Geon-woo by Bangwool showed that Se-ah was indeed possessed and the phone call from Haetsal is real. Geon-woo reaches Haetsal after much difficulty, and she attempts to destroy the curse by stabbing an arrow into Hye-ryung's phone. However, they discover that the true maehyung is Si-won's phone; Si-won had made a dying wish to perpetuate the cycle. As Haetsal distracts Si-won's spirit, Se-ah confronts Na-ri. Consumed by jealousy and guilt, Na-ri attempts to murder Se-ah, stabbing her with a broken broom. However, Se-ah manages to knock Na-ri out and breaks into the server room. Se-ah retrieves Si-won's phone and destroys it with a misfired arrow from Haetsal, ending the curse. In the aftermath, the survivors mourn Hyeong-wook and Na-ri, with Se-ah feeling guilty that she was unable to save Na-ri. They find solace with Haetsal and a recovering Bangwool who reveals his new power to see spirits. A mid-credits scene reveals the cycle may remain unbroken: Min-soo, Hyeong-wook's friend, receives a mysterious Discord message and recovers Na-ri's phone. As he opens the Girigo app, the screen glows, suggesting that the digital curse continues to haunt the living.

== Production ==
=== Development ===
Netflix announced the production of the series in March 2025, under the working title Wish Your Death. The project was developed with a focus on the "Young Adult Horror" subgenre, aiming to blend traditional elements of spirits and curses with modern digital culture. According to the production announcement, the narrative explores the psychological instability and aspirations of teenagers, specifically utilizing a mobile application as the central medium for the supernatural conflict. Park Youn-seo was put in charge to direct from a screenplay penned by Park Joong-seop with CJ ENM Studios and Kairos Makers managing the production.

=== Casting ===
The casting process prioritized rising actors to provide a "fresh" perspective to the ensemble, which includes Jeon So-young, Kang Mi-na, Baek Sun-ho, Hyun Woo-seok, and Lee Hyo-je. Following the announcement of five lead actors, Jeon So-nee and Roh Jae-won also joined the cast.

In June 2025, it was reported that Kim Si-a would make a special appearance. Later, in an interview with Star News, Park Soo-oh confirmed his involvement in the series, noting that he would appear as a character in a specific episode.

=== Marketing ===
In March 2026, Netflix released the first teaser poster and trailer for the series. The poster features Yoo Se-ah in a school hallway with a cracked smartphone, featuring the tagline: "Got a wish worth dying for?" (Note: The tagline: "Got a wish worth dying for?" is from the series' English poster while the Korean tagline is as follow: "Do you have one? A wish you'd die to grant.") The accompanying trailer introduced the "red timer" mechanic of the Girigo app, showing Choi Hyeong-wook in a state of distress as a countdown begins on his device.

== Release ==
Netflix confirmed If Wishes Could Kill was scheduled to be released in the second quarter of 2026. By March 2026, the series was confirmed to premiere globally on April 24.

== Reception ==
=== Critical response ===
On the review aggregator website Rotten Tomatoes, 88% of 8 critics' reviews are positive, with an average rating of 6.4/10.

=== Viewership ===
If Wishes Could Kill debuted at number four on Netflix's global weekly chart for non-English shows. According to data from Netflix Tudum for the week of April 20–26, the series recorded 2.8 million views in its first three days. It reached the top 10 in 37 countries, including South Korea, Hong Kong, Singapore, the Philippines, Mexico, Peru, India, and the Czech Republic.
