= Kakao Webtoon =

South Korean webtoon platform

- Website type: Webtoon platform
- Available in: Korean
- Owner: Kakao Entertainment
- Website: webtoon.kakao.com
- Commercial: Yes
- Registration: Optional
- Launched: 2003 Korean; 2021 Thai, Traditional Chinese, 2022 Indonesian
- Current status: Active (Korean); Discountinued (Thai, Traditional Chinese, and Indonesian)

Kakao Webtoon (Korean: 카카오 웹툰) is a webtoon platform operated by Kakao.

== History ==
The service originally launched in 2003 by Daum, a popular web portal in Korea, as Daum Webtoon making it the first official webtoon platform in the world. It would operate under Daum up until the company merged with Kakao in 2014. The service operated as Daum Webtoon alongside Kakao's other service, KakaoPage, attracting many readers to its platform. It wasn't until August 1, 2021, when the service was relaunched as Kakao Webtoon in order to expand globally and management changed to the platform now being operated by Kakao Entertainment, a subsidiary of Kakao. The service also expanded to Thailand and Taiwan that same year. In April 2022, an Indonesian language service was launched to replace the Indonesian KakaoPage service.

Since October 2024, Kakao began to shut down Webtoon services globally due to the decline in popularity and financial difficulties, beginning with the Taiwanese, Thai and Indonesian versions in 2025. On September 22, 2026, Kakao announced that it will shut down Tapas and merge Kakao Webtoon into KakaoPage by the end of 2026.

== Adaptations ==
=== Adaptations of Daum/Kakao webtoons ===
Title	Author	Format	Premiere	Notes	Reference
Apt (아파트)	Kang Full	Film	July 6, 2006	Toilet Pictures	
The Great Catsby (위대한 캣츠비)	Doha Kang and Kim Seung-jin	TV series	July 4, 2007	Produced by May Queen Pictures; Broadcast on tvN	
Fool (바보)	Kang Full	Film	February 28, 2008	Wire to Wire Film	
Love Story (순정만화)	Kang Full	Film	November 27, 2008	Lets Films; MNFC; Cheong-a-ram	
Moss (이끼)	Yoon Tae-ho	Film	July 14, 2010	Cinema Service	
Aridong Last Cowboy (아리동 라스트 카우보이)	Zephy	TV special	August 14, 2010	Broadcast on KBS 2TV	
Aridong Last Cowboy (아리동 라스트 카우보이)	Zephy	Film	November 29, 2017	AD406	
Mary Stayed Out All Night (매리는 외박중)	Won Soo-yeon	TV series	November 8, 2010	Produced by ACC Korea and KBS Media; Broadcast on KBS 2TV	
I Love You (그대를 사랑합니다)	Kang Full	Film	February 17, 2011	NEW	
I Love You (그대를 사랑합니다)	Kang Full	TV series	April 16, 2012	Broadcast on SBS F!L	
Pained (통증)	Kang Full	Film	September 7, 2011	Lotte Entertainment	
Neighbor (이웃사람)	Kang Full	Film	August 23, 2012	Lotte Entertainment	
26 Years (26년)	Kang Full	Film	November 29, 2012	Invent Stone Corp. Chungeorahm Film	
Fists of Legend (전설의 주먹)	Lee Jong-gyu and Lee Yoon-gyun	Film	April 10, 2013	Cinema Service	
Covertly, Gloriously (은밀하게 위대하게)	Hun	Film	June 5, 2013	Showbox/Mediaplex	
The 5ive Hearts (더 파이브)	Jeong Yeon-shik	Film	November 14, 2013	Cinema Service; KT Media Hub	
Misaeng (미생)	Yoon Tae-ho	TV series	October 17, 2014	Produced by Number Three Pictures; Broadcast on tvN	
Hogu's Love (a/k/a Fool for You) (호구의 사랑)	Yoo Hyun-sook	TV series	February 9, 2015	Produced by MI Inc. Broadcast on tvN	
Super Daddy Yeol (슈퍼대디 열)	Lee Sang-hoon and Jin Hyo-mi	TV series	March 3, 2015	Produced by and broadcast on tvN	
The Insiders (내부자들)	Yoon Tae-ho	Film	November 19, 2015	Showbox	
Timing (타이밍)	Kang Full	Animated Film	December 10, 2015	Hyoin Entertainment	
Steel Rain (강철비)	Woo-Suk Yang and Zephy	Film	December 14, 2017	Mofac & Alfred	
Steel Rain (강철비)	Woo-Suk Yang and Zephy	Film	July 29, 2020	Mofac & Alfred	
Love Alarm (좋아하면 울리는)	Chon Kye-young	TV series	August 22, 2019 (season 1); March 12, 2021 (season 2)	Produced by Studio Dragon and Production H Broadcast on Netflix	
July Found by Chance (어쩌다 발견한 7월)	Moo Ryu	TV series	October 2, 2019	Produced by MBC and RaemongRaein; Broadcast on MBC TV	
July Found by Chance (어쩌다 발견한 7월)	Moo Ryu	Film	TBA	Kross Pictures USA	
Killed My Wife (아내를 죽였다)	Hee Na-ri	Film	December 11, 2019	Dante Media Lab; KT Hitel	
Itaewon Class (이태원 클라쓰)	Kwang Jin	TV series	January 31, 2020	Produced by Showbox, Zium Content and Itaewon Class Production Partners; Broadcast on JTBC	
Memorist (메모리스트)	Jae Hoo	TV series	March 11, 2020	Produced by Studio Dragon and Studio 605; Broadcast on tvN	
Friend Contract (계약우정)	Kwon Laad	TV series	April 6, 2020	Produced by Mega Monster; Broadcast on KBS 2TV	
Twin Tops Bar (쌍갑포차)	Bae Hye-soo	TV series	May 20, 2020	Produced by Samhwa Networks and JTBC Studios; Broadcast on JTBC	
Amazing Rumor (경이로운 소문)	Jang Yi	TV series	November 28, 2020	Produced by Studio Dragon and Neo Entertainment; Broadcast on OCN	
Navillera (Like a Butterfly) (나빌레라)	HUN and Jimin	TV series	March 22, 2021	Produced by Studio Dragon and The Great Show; Broadcast on tvN	
Goblin Hill (도깨비언덕에 왜 왔니?)	Yonghoe Kim	Animated Series	July 21, 2021	Produced by Soul Creative and CJ ENM; Broadcast on Tooniverse	
City Girl Drinkers (술꾼도시처녀들)	Mikkang	Web series	October 22, 2021	Produced by Bon Factory Worldwide; Broadcast on TVING	
Dr. Brain (Dr.브레인)	Hongjacga	Web series	November 4, 2021	Produced by YG STUDIOPLEX, Kakao Entertainment, Bound Entertainment and Dark Circle Pictures; Broadcast on Apple TV+	
Jinx's Lover (징크스의 연인)	Han Ji-hye and Goo Seul	TV series	June 15, 2022	Produced by Victory Contents; Broadcast on KBS 2TV	
The Killing Vote (국민사형투표)	Uhm Se-yoon and Jung Yi-pum	TV series	August 10, 2023	Produced by Pan Entertainment and Studio S Broadcast on SBS TV	
Karma (악연)	Choi Hee-seon	Web series	April 4, 2025	Produced by Moonlight Film, Baram Pictures, and Kakao Entertainment; Broadcast on Netflix	
Bunny and Her Boys (바니와 오빠들)	Ni-eun	TV series	April 11, 2025	Produced by Kakao Entertainment; Broadcast on MBC TV	
CA$HERO (캐셔로)	Team Befar (Lee Hoon and No Hye-ok)	Web series	December 26, 2025	Produced by SLL and Drama House Studio; Broadcast on Netflix	
Going to Work Tomorrow Too! (내일도 출근)	McQueen Studio	TV series	June 22, 2026	Produced by Studio Dragon and Kross Pictures Broadcast on tvN	
Dead Man's Letter (망자의 서)	GAR2 and Teacher Oh	TV series	TBA	Produced by Mega Monster; In development, to be broadcast on KBS 2TV	
Dolled Up (대새녀의 메이크업 이야기)	Yeo Eun	TV series	TBA	Produced by Showbox; In development, to be broadcast on JTBC	

== See also ==
- KakaoPage
- Piccoma
- Tapas
