= Yeon-woo (name) =

- Hangul: 연우
- RR: Yeonu
- MR: Yŏnu

Yeon-woo is a Korean given name.

People with this name include:

- Go Yeon-u (died 227), posthumous name Sansang of Goguryeo, tenth ruler of Goguryeo
- Chang Yŏn-u (died 1015), Goryeo government official
- Cho Yeon-woo (born Cho Jong-wook, 1971), South Korean actor
- Kim Yeon-woo (born 1971), South Korean male singer
- Nam Yeon-woo (born 1982), South Korean actor
- Jhi Yeon-woo (born 1984), South Korean female bodybuilder
- Yeon Woo (singer, born 1981), South Korean female pop singer

Fictional characters with this name include

- Kim/Kwon Yeon-woo, in Kang Full's 2003 webcomic Love Story (and 2008 South Korean film adaptation Hello, Schoolgirl)
- Heo Yeon-woo, in 2012 South Korean television series Moon Embracing the Sun adapted from the 2011 novel by Jung Eun-gwol
- Woo Yeon-woo, in 2023 South Korean television series The Heavenly Idol
- Yoon Yeon-woo, in 2023 South Korean television series My Perfect Stranger

== See also ==
- List of Korean given names
