= Face on Lie =

2018 manhwa series by Tammi Kim

^껍데기
- Genre: Thriller, Drama
- Author: Tammi Kim
- Original run: 2018–2020

Face on Lie (Korean: 껍데기) is a South Korean manhwa series written and illustrated by Tammi Kim. Started in April 2018 to March 2020, this webtoon manhwa was released on Daum. A Chinese donghua series adaptation by Bilibili was released on April 28 to August 4, 2022.

== Donghua ==
Face on Lie
- Country of origin: China
- Original language: Chinese
- No. of episodes: 16

Original release
- Network: Bilibili
- Release: April 28 – August 4, 2022

A Chinese donghua series based on webtoon aired on Bilibili from April 28 to August 4, 2022.
