= I Will Fall with the Emperor =

South Korean manhwa series

- Manhwa cover

황제와 함께 타락하겠습니다 RR: Hwangjewa hamkke tarakhagetseumnida MR: Hwangjewa hamkke t'arakhagessŭmnida
- Genre: Adventure, isekai
- Author: Tenichi
- Publisher: Futabasha (Japan)
- Webtoon service: Kakao Webtoon (South Korea); Piccoma (Japan); Gaugau Monster (Japan)
- Original run: October 11, 2022 – present
- Volumes: 6

I Will Fall with the Emperor (Korean: 황제와 함께 타락하겠습니다) is a South Korean manhwa released as a webtoon created by Tenichi. It began publication in Kakao Corporation's KakaoPage and Kakao Webtoon services in October 2022. It is also published in Japanese on multiple online services.

== Plot ==
The series follows Larcy, a princess from the Kingdom of Berry. After a failed attempt to rescue her sister Nicola, she finds herself captured by the Chariot Empire. Returning to Berry after ten years, she is shocked to learn that the royal family, including Nicola, had betrayed her. Accused her of being the cause of a war between Berry and Chariot, Larcy is executed, only to find herself sent back in time ten years. Determined to seek revenge, Larcy marries Jevon Van Verben, the emperor of the Chariot Empire, with the goal of avenging her prior death and betraying her family for their actions.

== Characters ==
Larcy
Nicknamed the Princess of Bats, she was taken captive by the Chariot Empire after failing to rescue her sister Nicola. She was treated poorly and betrayed after her family reveals to her that she was not a legitimate child of the King. She is later executed after being accused of provoking a war between the Kingdom of Berry and the Empire of Chariot. Wishing to seek revenge against those who betrayed her, she finds herself back in time, where she ends up marrying into the Empire of Chariot as a way to avenge her previous life.
Jevon Van Verben
The emperor of the Chariot Empire and Larcy's husband. Larcy married him with the aim of using the Chariot Empire to avenge the betrayal in her previous life. He is known for being a ruthless and cold ruler. In addition to Larcy, he also has multiple concubines.
Nicola
Larcy's sister. In contrast to Larcy, who has black hair, she was blonde hair. She was groomed from the start to be an Empress. She betrayed Larcy when Larcy returned from captivity, revealing that Larcy was not the king's real daughter.

== Publication ==
Created by Tenichi, the series began publication on Kakao Corporation's KakaoPage and Kakao Webtoon services on October 11, 2022. The series is also published in Japanese under the title Omotome Itadaita Bōkun Heika no Akujo Desu (お求め頂いた暴君陛下の悪女です), with its chapters being posted on multiple services such as Piccoma and Gaugau Monster.

== Reception ==
The series ranked second in the 2024 Tateyomi Manga Awards, and placed third in the web category of the 2025 Next Manga Award. The series was also nominated for the 2025 Tateyomi Manga Awards. It was one of the most popular webtoon releases on the Piccoma service in 2025, being selected as one of the winners of the Smartoon category at the Piccoma Awards that year.
