= Park Ji-hyun (actress) =

South Korean actress (born 1994)

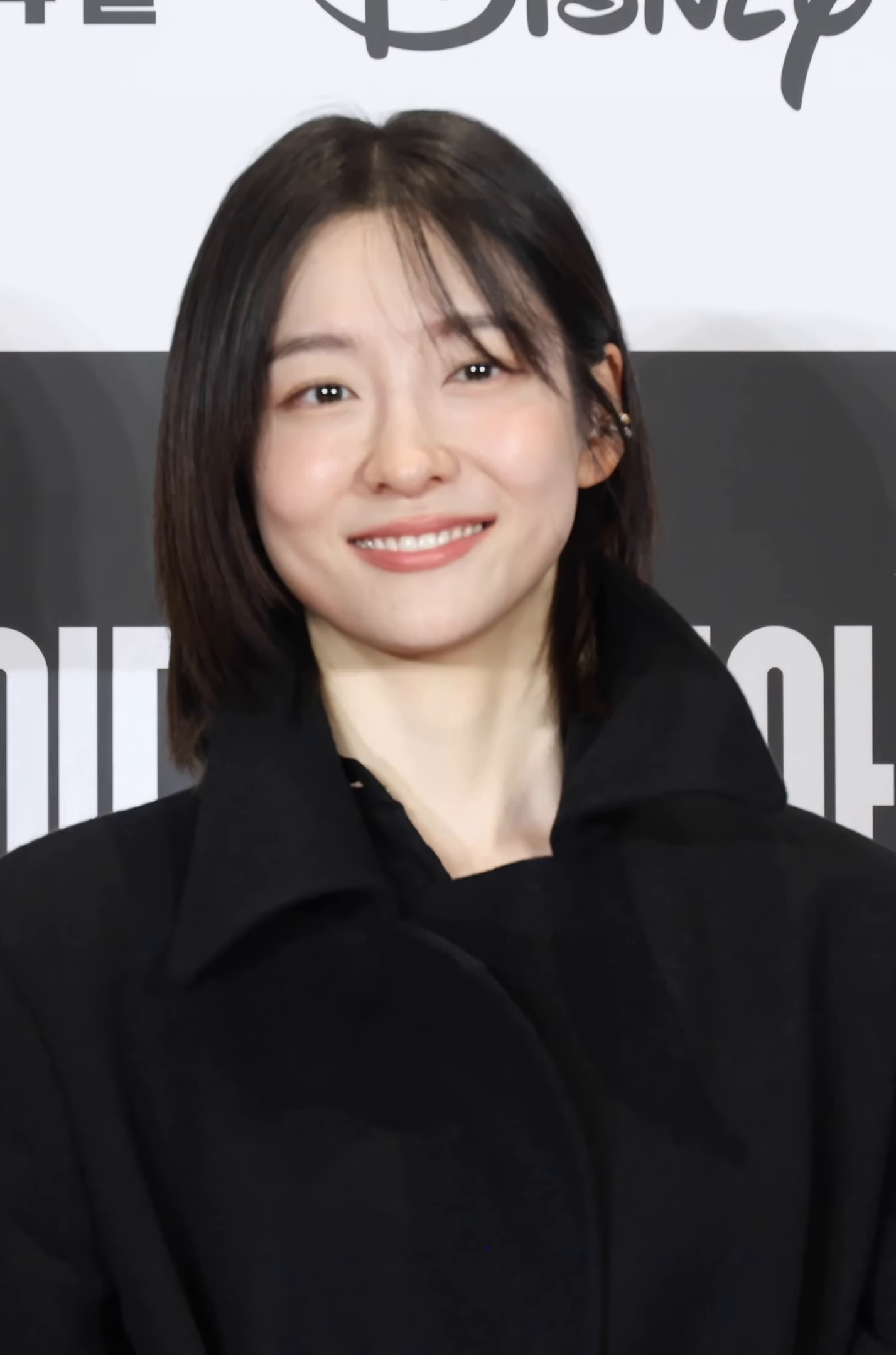
- Park in December 2025
- Born: November 26, 1994 (age 31); Chuncheon, South Korea
- Education: Cheonan Girls' High School, Hankuk University of Foreign Studies (Department of Spanish Language)
- Occupations: Actress; model
- Years active: 2017–present
- Agent: Namoo Actors

Korean name
- Hangul: 박지현
- RR: Bak Jihyeon
- MR: Pak Chihyŏn
- Website: namooactors.com

Park Ji-hyun (Korean: 박지현; born November 26, 1994) is a South Korean actress and model. She is best known for her roles in the television series Rookie Historian Goo Hae-ryung (2019) and Do You Like Brahms? (2020), as well as in films such as Gonjiam: Haunted Asylum (2018) and The Divine Fury (2019).

== Early life and education ==
Park Ji-hyun's early interest in acting began in middle and high school, where she took some acting classes. However, her parents advised her to attend college first before seriously pursuing her passion. She enrolled in the Spanish Language Department Hankuk University of Foreign Studies. After she was accepted, she began attending an acting academy to formally train as an actor.

== Career ==
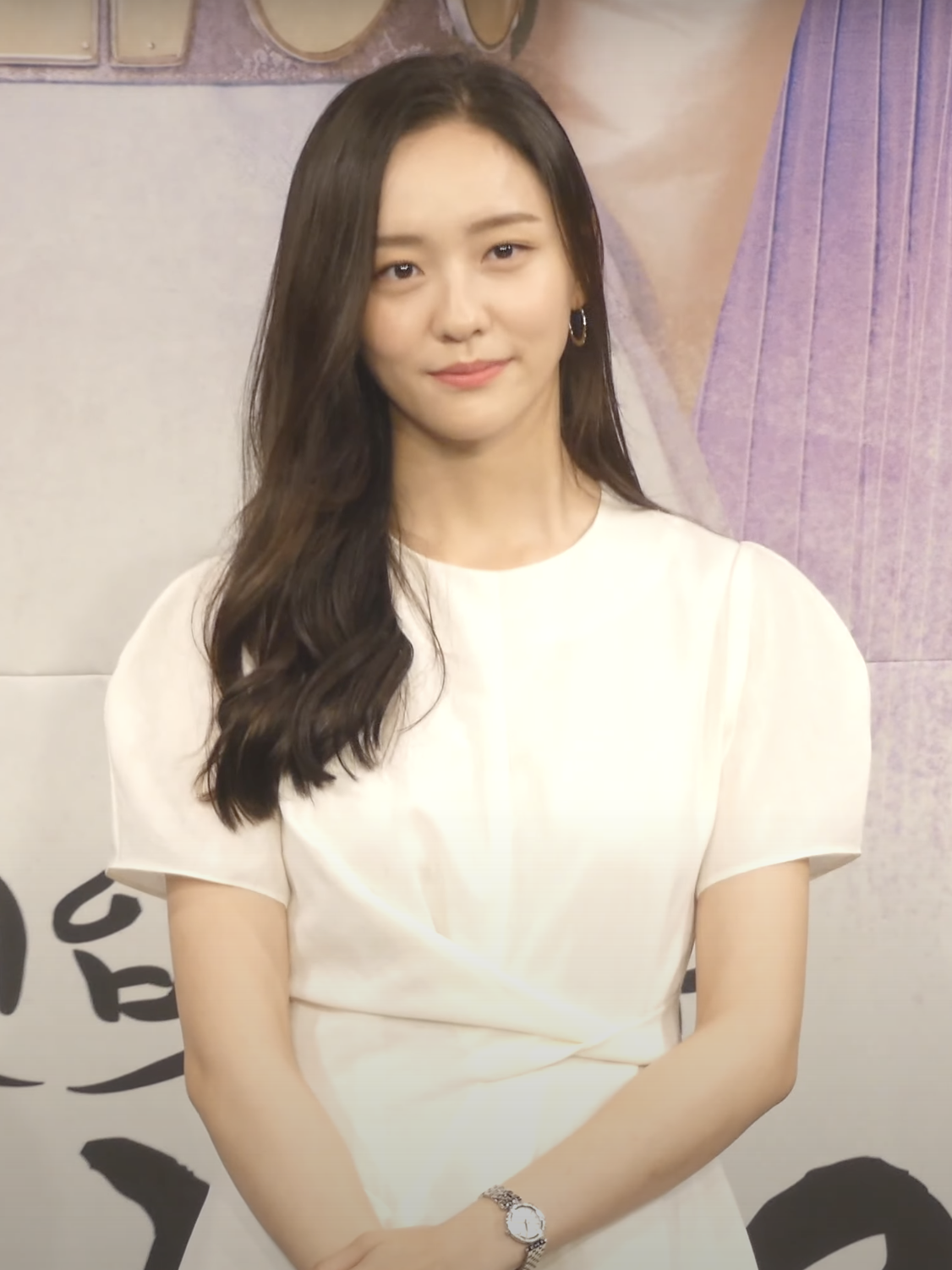
Park in July 2019

Park joined the agency Namoo Actors in 2016 and made her debut as an actress in 2017.

Park landed her first leading role in the 2018 South Korean horror film Gonjiam: Haunted Asylum, directed by Jung Bum-shik. The film, which is based on a real-life psychiatric hospital, follows a web series crew that travels to an abandoned lunatic asylum for a live broadcast. Starring alongside Wi Ha-joon, Park Sung-hoon, and others, Park's performance was nominated for Rookie of the Year at both the 39th Blue Dragon Film Awards and the Chunsa Film Art Awards. The film opened theatrically in South Korea on March 28, 2018. A commercial success, the film became the third most-watched horror film in South Korea after A Tale of Two Sisters and Phone. Later, it was screened at the 20th Udine Far East Film Festival.

She has taken on several roles in films and television dramas since her debut, including those in Your Honor (2018) and The Divine Fury (2019).

In 2020, Park took on the supporting role of Lee Jun-kyung in SBS drama Do You Like Brahms?, a role that earned her a nomination for Best New Actress at the 2020 SBS Drama Awards. She followed this with an appearance in the 2021 TVING series Yumi's Cells. In the show, Park played Seo Sae-yi, a programmer who serves as a love rival to protagonist Yumi (played by Kim Go-eun) due to her unrequited feelings for their boss, Goo Woong (played by Ahn Bo-hyun).

Park gained widespread recognition for her portrayal of Mo Hyun-min, the ambitious and intellectually sharp daughter-in-law of the Sunyang Group chaebol family, in the 2022 JTBC fantasy drama series Reborn Rich. The role, opposite lead actors Song Joong-ki and Lee Sung-min, showcased her ability to embody a character driven by unhidden ambition and desire, which she described in interviews as a new experience in expressing such traits without restraint. Park's performance in the series, which became one of the highest-viewed Korean cable dramas, marked a significant breakthrough in her career, elevating her profile after years of supporting roles and leading to increased opportunities.

Park landed her first lead role in the 2024 SBS series Flex X Cop, playing Lee Gang-hyun, a seasoned detective who is also the first female team leader in the violent crime department. It marked her second collaboration with Ahn Bo-hyun. The series was well received by audiences and peaked at an 11.0% viewership rating. Park was awarded the Excellence Award, Actress in a Miniseries Genre/Action Drama, at the 2024 SBS Drama Awards. Park revealed that the physically challenging role made her realize the importance of stamina for an actress, and she began to seriously train in both exercise and ballet.

Park starred in the erotic mystery-thriller film Hidden Face, which was released on November 20, 2024. The film is a remake of the 2011 Spanish-Colombian film The Hidden Face. Park was drawn to the project after enjoying the original and appreciating director Kim Dae-woo's previous work. She took on the role of Kim Mi-joo, starring alongside Song Seung-heon and Cho Yeo-jeong. The film became a box office success, notably becoming the first R-rated film to surpasses 1 million viewers during local theatrical release since 2019. Park was nominated as Best New Actress at the 61st Baeksang Arts Awards.

In 2025, Park starred in the film Forbidden Fairytale. In September, she reunited with Kim Go-eun in the Netflix original series You and Everything Else. For her performance, she was nominated for Best Actress at the 62nd Baeksang Arts Awards and the 5th Blue Dragon Series Awards.

In 2026, Park has starred in the film Wild Sing and led in tvN romantic comedy series See You at Work Tomorrow!. She is set to appear in KBS series, Love Cloud air in 2027.

== Filmography ==
Key
†	Denotes films that have not yet been released

=== Film ===
Year	Title	Role	Ref.
2017	Control	Ah-ri	
2018	The Chase	Kim Soo-kyung	
2018	Gonjiam: Haunted Asylum	Ji-hyun	
2018	A Man's True Colors	Couple at Chinese restaurant	
2019	The Divine Fury	Soo-jin	
2022	Anchor	Seo Seung-ah	
2024	Hidden Face	Kim Mi-joo	
2025	Forbidden Fairytale	Yoon Dan-bi	
2026	Wild Sing	Byeon Do-mi	
2026	Sinner †	Hong Sun-hwa	

=== Television series ===
Year	Title	Role	Notes	Ref.
2017	Saimdang, Memoir of Colors	Lee-yun		
2017	The King in Love	Bi-yeon		
2018	Your Honor	Park Hae-na		
2018	My Secret Terrius	Clara Choi		
2018	Eun Joo's Room	Ryu Hye-jin		
2019	Rookie Historian Goo Hae-ryung	Song Sa-hee		
2020	Do You Like Brahms?	Lee Jung-kyung		
2021–2022	Yumi's Cells	Seo Sae-i	Season 1	
2022	Love All Play	Park Jun-young		
2022	Reborn Rich	Mo Hyun-min		
2024	Flex X Cop	Lee Kang-hyun	Season 1	
2025	You and Everything Else	Cheon Sang-yeon		
2026	Our Universe	Woo Hyun-joo	Special appearance	
2026	See You at Work Tomorrow!	Cha Ji-yoon		
2027	Love Cloud	Ahn Ha-ni		

== Discography ==
=== Soundtrack appearances ===
List of soundtrack appearances, showing year released, and name of the album
Title	Year	Album	Ref.
"Love Is" (Note: Credited as TRIANGLE)	2026	Wild Sing OST	
"Shout It Out"	2026	Wild Sing OST	

== Accolades ==
=== Awards and nominations ===
Name of the award ceremony, year presented, category, nominee of the award, and the result of the nomination
Award	Year	Category	Nominee / Work	Result	Ref.
Baeksang Arts Awards	2025	Best New Actress – Film	Hidden Face	Nominated	
Baeksang Arts Awards	2026	Best Actress – Television	You and Everything Else	Nominated	
Blue Dragon Film Awards	2018	Best New Actress	Gonjiam: Haunted Asylum	Nominated	
Blue Dragon Film Awards	2025	Best Supporting Actress	Hidden Face	Won	
Blue Dragon Film Awards	2026	Best Supporting Actress	Wild Sing	Pending	
Blue Dragon Series Awards	2026	Best Actress	You and Everything Else	Nominated	
Chunsa Film Art Awards	2018	Rookie of the Year Award	Gonjiam: Haunted Asylum	Nominated	
International Emmy Awards	2026	Best Performance by an Actress	You and Everything Else	Pending	
Korea Drama Awards	2026	Excellence Actress	You and Everything Else	Nominated	
Korean Film Producers Association Awards	2025	Best Supporting Actress	Hidden Face	Won	
MBC Drama Awards	2019	Excellence Award, Actress in a Wednesday-Thursday Miniseries	Rookie Historian Goo Hae-ryung	Nominated	
SBS Drama Awards	2020	Best New Actress	Do You Like Brahms?	Nominated	
SBS Drama Awards	2024	Excellence Award, Actress in a Miniseries Genre/Action Drama	Flex X Cop	Won	

=== Listicles ===
Name of publisher, year listed, name of listicle, and placement
Publisher	Year	Listicle	Placement	Ref.
Cine21	2020	Five Rising Stars that Cine21 is paying attention to	Placed	
Cine21	2023	Top 5 New Actress to watch in 2023	Placed	
Cine21	2026	Top 5 Actress to watch in 2026	3rd	
