= Soo-young =

- Hangul: 수영
- RR: Suyeong
- MR: Suyŏng

Soo-young, also spelled Su-yeong or Su-young, is a Korean given name.

== People ==
People with this name include:

=== Entertainers ===
- Sooyoung Park (born 1967), American male singer-songwriter
- Lee Soo-young (born Lee Jee-yeon, 1979), South Korean female singer
- Ryu Soo-young (born Eoh Nam-seon 1979), South Korean actor
- Shoo (singer) (born Yoo Soo-young, 1981), South Korean female singer, member of girl group S.E.S.
- Choi Soo-young (born 1990), South Korean female singer, better known as Sooyoung, member of girl group Girls' Generation
- Park Soo-ah (born Park Soo-young, 1992), South Korean female singer, member of girl group After School
- Joy (singer) (born Park Soo-young, 1996), South Korean female singer, member of girl group Red Velvet
- Yves (singer) (born Ha Soo-young, 1997), South Korean female singer, soloist and member of girl group Loona

=== Others ===
- Kim Soo-young (1921–1968), South Korean male poet
- Jung Su-young (born 1985), South Korean male handball player
- Jang Soo-young (born 1988), South Korean female badminton player

== Fictional characters ==
Fictional characters with this name include:

- Soo-young, male character in 2001 South Korean television series Mina
- Han Soo-young, female character in 2000s South Korean manhwa series Love Story
- Kim Soo-young, male character in 2013 South Korean television series All About My Romance
- No Soo-young, female character in 2013 South Korean television series Potato Star 2013QR3
- Han Sooyoung, female character in 2018 South Korean web-novel series Omniscient Reader's Viewpoint

== See also ==
- List of Korean given names
