= Amar a morir =

2009 film

- Theatrical Poster
- Directed by: Fernando Lebrija
- Written by: Fernando Lebrija; Harrison Reiner
- Produced by: David Wisnievitz; Matthias Ehrenberg; Miguel Angel Boccaloni; Harrison Reiner
- Starring: José María de Tavira; Martina García; Alberto Estrella
- Cinematography: Masanobu Takayanagi
- Edited by: Radu Ion
- Production company: Laguna Pictures
- Release date: April 9, 2009
- Running time: 119 minutes
- Countries: Mexico; Colombia
- Language: Spanish

Amar a morir ("Love to Die") is a 2009 Mexican-Colombian drama film. The film marks Fernando Lebrija's directorial debut. The movie was filmed in Mexico City, in the State of Michoacán and in the town of Ocelotitlán, Michoacán.

== Plot ==
Alejandro is a rich kid who is trying to escape from his own demons. In his journey he reaches a beach town where he meets a girl, who shows him the other side of life, a simple and beautiful side. But even in paradise, he encounters the demons he is trying to escape from.

== Cast ==
- José María de Tavira as Alejandro Vizcaíno.
- Martina García as Rosa.
- Alberto Estrella as Tigre.
- Craig McLachlan as Nick.
- Raúl Méndez as Tiburón.
- Mayra Serbulo as Amalia.
- Silverio Palacios as Pancho.
- Miguel Rodarte as Capitán Fernández.
- Luis Roberto Guzmán as Luis Ro.
- Catalina López as Flor.
- Sergio Jurado as Ricardo Vizcaíno.
- Renata Campos as Patricia Vizcaíno.
- Jimena Guerra as Rebeca Corcuera.
- Francisco Avendaño as Francisco Corcuera.
- Patricia Archer as Barbara Corcuera.
- Benjamín Martínez as Marcial.
- José Sefami as Pedro Gómez.
- Antonio Gaona as Paco.
- John Archer as Pelos.
- Jorge Becerril as Sargento Flores.

== Awards ==
The film debuted in the Festival Internacional de Cine de Santa Bárbara 2009, where it won the Nueva Vision Award to the best Latin Cinema film.
