= See You at Work Tomorrow! =

2026 South Korean television series

- Promotional poster
- Hangul: 내일도 출근
- Lit.: Going to Work Tomorrow Too!
- RR: Naeildo chulgeun
- MR: Naeildo ch'ulgŭn
- Genre: Workplace; Romantic comedy
- Based on: Back to Work! by McQueen Studio
- Written by: Kim Gyeong-min
- Directed by: Jo Eun-sol
- Starring: Seo In-guk; Park Ji-hyun
- Country of origin: South Korea
- Original language: Korean
- No. of episodes: 12

Production
- Production companies: Studio Dragon; Kross Pictures

Original release
- Network: tvN
- Release: June 22 – July 28, 2026

See You at Work Tomorrow! (Korean: 내일도 출근) is a South Korean workplace romantic comedy television series written by Kim Kyung-min, directed by Jo Eun-sol, and starring Seo In-guk and Park Ji-hyun. Based on the 2020 Kakao webtoon Back to Work! by McQueen Studio, the series follows Ji-yoon, a seven-year office worker with a chronic illness, as she forms an unlikely bond with her boss Si-woo, leading to a deep and irreplaceable friendship. It aired on tvN from June 22, to July 28, 2026, every Monday and Tuesday at 20:50 (KST). It is also available for streaming on TVING and Wavve in South Korea and globally on Amazon Prime Video.

== Synopsis ==
Cha Ji-yoon is a seven-year office professional at Saeum Electronics, enters a career plateau. To navigate internal departmental shifts, she begins working under Kang Si-woo, a manager noted for his rigid adherence to workplace discipline. The drama depicts the development of their relationship alongside the personal challenges faced by their colleagues.

== Cast and characters ==
=== Main ===
- Seo In-guk as Kang Si-woo

A department manager known for his disciplined lifestyle and blunt communication style, which has earned him a reputation for being difficult among his subordinates.

- Park Ji-hyun as Cha Ji-yoon

A professional with seven years of experience who is recognized by her colleagues for her work instincts but is currently facing professional exhaustion.

=== Supporting ===
- Kang Mi-na as Yoon No-ah

An employee in the same department who recently ended a long-term relationship. She seeks a fresh start and eventually encounters a new romantic interest through her hobbies.

- Choi Kyung-hoon as Cho Ga-eul

A band vocalist dreaming of becoming a singer and the first love of Cha Ji-yoon during their college years.

- Won Gyu-bin as Lee Jae-in

A 23-year college student who approaches Yoon No-ah without hesitation.

- Hong Woo-jin as Ko Young-sam

A team leader in Product Planning Team 1 of the DA Business Division at Saeum Electronics.

- Yang Byung-yeol as Lee Young-hoon

A 9-year senior employee at Saeum Electronics who is currently on leave.

- Park Ye-young as Choi Su-jin
- Kim Jung-young as Han Woo-jin
- Kang Ki-doong as Jeon Ki-tae
- Han Tae-ha as Koo Seung-jun
- Lee Jae-yi as Sin Na-ri
- Heo Jun-seo as Cha Jun-soo
- Ahn So-yo as Lee Hye-ji

=== Special appearance ===
- Park Seo-ham as Song Min-kyu

== Episodes ==
No.	Title	Directed by	Written by	Original release date
1	"Even if the Sky Falls, Still Clocking In!"; Transliteration: "Haneuli muneojyeodo, chulgeun!" (Korean: 하늘이 무너져도, 출근!)	Jo Eun-sol	Kim Gyeong-min	June 22, 2026
2	"Dreaming of Quitting, Still Clocking In!"; Transliteration: "Toesareul kkumkkwodo, chulgeun!" (Korean: 퇴사를 꿈꿔도, 출근!)	Jo Eun-sol	Kim Gyeong-min	June 23, 2026
3	"Sick or Not, Still Clocking In!"; Transliteration: "Sangsabyeonge geolryeodo, chulgeun!" (Korean: 상사병에 걸려도, 출근!)	Jo Eun-sol	Kim Gyeong-min	June 29, 2026
4	"Broke Up Yesterday, Still Clocking In!"; Transliteration: "Eoje ibyeolhaedo, chulgeun!" (Korean: 어제 이별해도, 출근!)	Jo Eun-sol	Kim Gyeong-min	June 30, 2026
5	"Have a "Meeting", Still Clocking In!"; Transliteration: "Mitingeul nagado, chulgeun!" (Korean: 미팅을 나가도, 출근!)	Jo Eun-sol	Kim Gyeong-min	July 6, 2026
6	"Busted for My Feelings, Still Clocking In!"; Transliteration: "Maeumeul deulkyeodo, chulgeun!" (Korean: 마음을 들켜도, 출근!)	Jo Eun-sol	Kim Gyeong-min	July 7, 2026
7	"Have a New Secret, Still Clocking In!"; Transliteration: "Bimiri saenggyeodo, chulgeun!" (Korean: 비밀이 생겨도, 출근!)	Jo Eun-sol	Kim Gyeong-min	July 13, 2026
8	"Held Back by My Past, Still Clocking In!"; Transliteration: "Gwageoga balmok japado, chulgeun!" (Korean: 과거가 발목 잡아도, 출근!)	Jo Eun-sol	Kim Gyeong-min	July 14, 2026
9	"There's an Error, Still Clocking In!"; Transliteration: "Oryuga balsaenghaedo, chulgeun!" (Korean: 오류가 발생해도, 출근!)	Jo Eun-sol	Kim Gyeong-min	July 20, 2026
10	"Don't Know the Answer, Still Clocking In!"; Transliteration: "Jeongdapeul al su eopeodo, chulgeun!" (Korean: 정답을 알 수 없어도, 출근!)	Jo Eun-sol	Kim Gyeong-min	July 21, 2026
11	"Even if Rumors Blur the Truth, Still Clocking In!"; Transliteration: "Somuni jinsireul garyeodo, chulgeun!" (Korean: 소문이 진실을 가려도, 출근!)	Jo Eun-sol	Kim Gyeong-min	July 27, 2026
12	"No Map to Follow, Still Clocking In!"; Transliteration: "Jidoga eopeodo, chulgeun!" (Korean: 지도가 없어도, 출근!)	Jo Eun-sol	Kim Gyeong-min	July 28, 2026

== Production ==
=== Development ===
The series is a television adaptation of the 2020 Kakao Webtoon Back to Work by McQueen Studio, which has recorded over 200 million views. In August 2025, tvN announced the project as part of its 2026 lineup. The drama is directed by Jo Eun-sol and written by Kim Kyung-min, with planning by Studio Dragon and production by Kross Pictures.

=== Casting ===
The casting process began in early 2025. On April 24, 2025, media outlets reported that Seo In-guk was in discussions to star as the male lead in the series. Five days later, Park Ji-hyun was cast as the female lead. On August 11, 2025, tvN officially confirmed the casting of Seo In-guk and Park Ji-hyun as the series leads.

Supporting cast members were finalized throughout the latter half of 2025. Kang Mi-na was confirmed on August 28, followed by Park Ye-young on September 2. By late September, Choi Kyung-hoon and Won Gyu-bin joined the ensemble as office staff members. In November 2025, the casting of Han Tae-ha in a supporting role was finalized. The cast was rounded out with the additions of veteran actress Kim Jung-young in November and Kang Ki-doong in December 2025.

=== Filming ===
Principal photography began in the second half of 2025.

== Original soundtrack ==
See You At Work Tomorrow! OST

Soundtrack album by Various artists
- Released: July 28, 2026
- Genre: Soundtrack
- Length: 99:14
- Languages: Korean; English
- Labels: Studio Dragon; TOON STUDIO

=== See You at Work Tomorrow!: OST ===
The drama's soundtrack is compiled in a two-part album released on 28 July 2026. CD 1 and CD 2 contain the drama's theme songs and musical score, respectively.

CD 1
No.	Title	Lyrics	Music	Artist	Length
1.	"Hopping"	Kim Jang-woo; Juhee	Kim Jang-woo; YoungBin	FIFTY FIFTY	3:21
2.	"My Wonder"	Kim Jang-woo; ColdoK	Kim Jang-woo; ColdoK	FIFTY FIFTY	2:54
3.	"Ice Princess (Kor Ver.)" (얼음공주)	Kim Jang-woo; Eo Young-soo	Kim Jang-woo; Eo Young-soo	HANA	3:22
4.	"Ice Princess (Eng Ver.)" (얼음공주 (Eng Ver.))	Kim Jang-woo; Eo Young-soo	Kim Jang-woo; Eo Young-soo	HANA	3:22
5.	"After Work" (퇴근길)	Kim Jang-woo; ET; Kim Si-hyuk; Cha Yeo-ui	Kim Jang-woo; ET; Kim Si-hyuk; Cha Yeo-ui	MRCH	2:41
6.	"My Place" (그 공간)	Kim Jang-woo; Eo Young-soo	Kim Jang-woo; Eo Young-soo	Moong Myang	3:50
7.	"The One Who Fills Me" (날 채워준 한 사람)	Kim Jang-woo; ET; Kim Si-hyuk; Cha Yeo-ui	Kim Jang-woo; ET; Kim Si-hyuk; Cha Yeo-ui	Seo In-guk	3:26
8.	"You Said"	Kim Jang-woo; Eo Young-soo	Kim Jang-woo; Eo Young-soo	The Stray	4:00
9.	"Stay in Me" (내 안에 머물러요)	Park Sung-jin; Kim Jang-woo	Park Sung-jin; Han Seong-eun	Bang Ye-dam, Whee In	3:53
10.	"Like a Cat" (고양이처럼)	Kim Jang-woo; Eo Young-soo	Kim Jang-woo; Eo Young-soo	Jo Gaeul	4:16
11.	"What Matters" (중요한 건)	Kim Jang-woo; Eo Young-soo	Kim Jang-woo; Eo Young-soo	Jo Gaeul	2:56
12.	"My Love, My Boss" (상사병)	Kim Jang-woo; Jang Su-min	KZ; Kim Hye-kwang	Jeon Sang Keun	4:06
Total length:					42:07

CD 2
No.	Title	Artist	Length
1.	"Go to Work Theme" (내일도 출근)	Kim Jang-woo, An Ji-ye	4:24
2.	"Warm Tomorrow" (내일도 따스하게)	Kim Jang-woo, Kim Seong-hyeon	2:36
3.	"Innocent Tomorrow" (내일도 청순하게)	Kim Jang-woo, An Ji-ye	2:36
4.	"Hopefully Tomorrow" (내일도 희망차게)	Kim Jang-woo, Kim Seong-hyeon	2:44
5.	"Beautiful Tomorrow" (내일도 아름답게)	Kim Jang-woo, An Ji-ye	2:34
6.	"Be Careful Tomorrow" (내일도 조심조심)	Kim Jang-woo, Kim Seong-hyeon	2:55
7.	"Pure Tomorrow" (내일도 맑게)	Kim Jang-woo, An Ji-ye	3:16
8.	"Relax Tomorrow" (내일도 여유 있게)	Kim Jang-woo, Kim Seong-hyeon	3:08
9.	"Fine Tomorrow" (내일도 잘될 거야)	Kim Jang-woo, An Ji-ye	2:28
10.	"Slowly Tomorrow" (내일도 천천히)	Kim Jang-woo, Kim Seong-hyeon	3:10
11.	"Together Tomorrow" (내일도 함께해줘)	Kim Jang-woo, An Ji-ye	3:00
12.	"Excited Tomorrow" (내일도 네 맘속으로)	Kim Jang-woo, Kim Seong-hyeon	2:47
13.	"Safely Tomorrow" (내일도 무사히)	Kim Jang-woo, An Ji-ye	2:30
14.	"OK Tomorrow" (내일도 이해할게)	Kim Jang-woo, Kim Seong-hyeon	4:06
15.	"Great Tomorrow" (내일도 최고일거야)	Kim Jang-woo, An Ji-ye	2:56
16.	"Hold Me Tomorrow" (내일도 손잡아줘)	Kim Jang-woo, Kim Seong-hyeon	3:04
17.	"Simple Tomorrow" (내일도 단순하게)	Kim Jang-woo, An Ji-ye	2:55
18.	"Busy Tomorrow" (내일도 바쁘다 바빠)	Kim Jang-woo, Kim Seong-hyeon	2:00
19.	"Nerdy Tomorrow" (내일도 바보인 척)	Kim Jang-woo, An Ji-ye	2:16
20.	"Picky Tomorrow" (내일도 까칠하게)	Kim Jang-woo, Kim Seong-hyeon	1:42
Total length:			58:27

See You at Work Tomorrow!: Original Soundtrack Parts 1–8

Part 1

Released on June 23, 2026
No.	Title	Lyrics	Music	Artist	Length
1.	"Hopping"	Kim Jang-woo; Juhee	Kim Jang-woo; YoungBin	FIFTY FIFTY	3:21
2.	"My Wonder"	Kim Jang-woo; ColdoK	Kim Jang-woo; ColdoK	FIFTY FIFTY	2:54
3.	"Ice Princess (Kor Ver.)" (얼음공주)	Kim Jang-woo; Eo Young-soo	Kim Jang-woo; Eo Young-soo	HANA	3:22
4.	"Ice Princess (Eng Ver.)" (얼음공주 (Eng Ver.))	Kim Jang-woo; Eo Young-soo	Kim Jang-woo; Eo Young-soo	HANA	3:22
5.	"Hopping" (Inst.)		Kim Jang-woo; YoungBin		3:21
6.	"My Wonder" (Inst.)		Kim Jang-woo; ColdoK		2:54
7.	"Ice Princess" (Inst.)		Kim Jang-woo; Eo Young-soo		3:22
Total length:					22:36

Part 2

Released on June 24, 2026
No.	Title	Lyrics	Music	Artist	Length
1.	"After Work" (퇴근길)	Kim Jang-woo; ET; Kim Si-hyuk; Cha Yeo-ui	Kim Jang-woo; ET; Kim Si-hyuk; Cha Yeo-ui	MRCH	2:41
2.	"After Work" (Inst.)		Kim Jang-woo; ET; Kim Si-hyuk; Cha Yeo-ui		2:41
Total length:					5:22

Part 3

Released on June 30, 2026
No.	Title	Lyrics	Music	Artist	Length
1.	"My Place" (그 공간)	Kim Jang-woo; Eo Young-soo	Kim Jang-woo; Eo Young-soo	Moong Myang	3:50
2.	"My Place" (Inst.)		Kim Jang-woo; Eo Young-soo		3:50
Total length:					7:40

Part 4

Released on July 1, 2026
No.	Title	Lyrics	Music	Artist	Length
1.	"The One Who Fills Me" (날 채워준 한 사람)	Kim Jang-woo; ET; Kim Si-hyuk; Cha Yeo-ui	Kim Jang-woo; ET; Kim Si-hyuk; Cha Yeo-ui	Seo In-guk	3:26
2.	"The One Who Fills Me" (Inst.)		Kim Jang-woo; ET; Kim Si-hyuk; Cha Yeo-ui		3:26
Total length:					6:52

Part 5

Released on July 8, 2026
No.	Title	Lyrics	Music	Artist	Length
1.	"You Said"	Kim Jang-woo; Eo Young-soo	Kim Jang-woo; Eo Young-soo	The Stray	4:00
2.	"You Said" (Inst.)		Kim Jang-woo; Eo Young-soo		4:00
Total length:					8:00

Part 6

Released on July 14, 2026
No.	Title	Lyrics	Music	Artist	Length
1.	"Stay in Me" (내 안에 머물러요)	Park Sung-jin; Kim Jang-woo	Park Sung-jin; Han Seong-eun	Bang Ye-dam, Whee In	3:53
2.	"Stay in Me" (Inst.)		Park Sung-jin; Han Seong-eun		3:53
Total length:					7:46

Part 7

Released on July 15, 2026
No.	Title	Lyrics	Music	Artist	Length
1.	"Like a Cat" (고양이처럼)	Kim Jang-woo; Eo Young-soo	Kim Jang-woo; Eo Young-soo	Jo Gaeul	4:16
2.	"What Matters" (중요한 건)	Kim Jang-woo; Eo Young-soo	Kim Jang-woo; Eo Young-soo	Jo Gaeul	2:56
3.	"Like a Cat" (Inst.)		Kim Jang-woo; Eo Young-soo		4:16
4.	"What Matters" (Inst.)		Kim Jang-woo; Eo Young-soo		2:56
Total length:					14:24

Part 8

Released on July 21, 2026
No.	Title	Lyrics	Music	Artist	Length
1.	"My Love, My Boss" (상사병)	Kim Jang-woo; Jang Su-min	KZ; Kim Hye-kwang	Jeon Sang Keun	4:06
2.	"My Love, My Boss" (Inst.)		KZ; Kim Hye-kwang		4:06
Total length:					8:12

== Release ==
The series aired on tvN's Monday-Tuesday time slot from June 22 to July 28, 2026, every Monday and Tuesday at 20:50 (KST).

It is also available for streaming on TVING and Wavve in South Korea and globally on Prime Video.

== Viewership ==
See You at Work Tomorrow! : South Korea viewers per episode (thousands)

Season	Episode number												Average
Season	1	2	3	4	5	6	7	8	9	10	11	12	Average
1	1165	1050	1083	1122	1232	999	995	1067	1099	1039	1114	1062	1086

Source: Audience measurement performed nationwide by Nielsen Korea.

Average TV viewership ratings
Ep.	Original broadcast date	Average audience share (Nielsen Korea)	
Ep.	Original broadcast date	Nationwide	Seoul
1	June 22, 2026	4.812% (1st)	4.772% (1st)
2	June 23, 2026	4.378% (2nd)	4.376% (1st)
3	June 29, 2026	4.522% (1st)	4.938% (1st)
4	June 30, 2026	4.508% (2nd)	5.385% (1st)
5	July 6, 2026	4.846% (2nd)	5.281% (1st)
6	July 7, 2026	4.274% (2nd)	4.525% (2nd)
7	July 13, 2026	4.112% (1st)	4.537% (1st)
8	July 14, 2026	4.365% (1st)	4.767% (1st)
9	July 20, 2026	4.706% (1st)	5.175% (1st)
10	July 21, 2026	4.356% (1st)	4.476% (1st)
11	July 27, 2026	4.562% (1st)	5.220% (1st)
12	July 28, 2026	4.566% (1st)	4.292% (1st)
Average		4.501%	4.812%
In the table above, the blue numbers represent the lowest ratings and the red numbers represent the highest ratings.; This drama aired on a cable channel/pay TV which normally has a relatively smaller audience compared to free-to-air TV/public broadcasters (KBS, SBS, MBC, and EBS).
