= Goblin Hill =

2013 manhwa series by Yonghoe Kim

도깨비언덕에 왜 왔니? Dokkaebieondeoge wae wanni?
- Genre: Fantasy
- Author: Yonghoe Kim
- Original run: 2013

Goblin Hill (Korean: 도깨비언덕에 왜 왔니?) is a South Korean manhwa series written and illustrated by Yonghoe Kim. Started in August 2013, this webtoon manhwa was released on Daum. A South Korean animated series adaptation by Soul Creative was announced in 2019, and the series aired from July 21, 2021, to February 16, 2022, on Tooniverse.

== Characters ==
- Park Garam (박가람; Korean: Kang Sae-bom)
- Dalnim (달님; Korean: Ga-ryung Kim)
- Laura (로라; Korean: Kim Sae-hae)
- Sirang (시랑; Korean: Park Seong-tae)
- Raccoon (너구리; Korean: Shin Yong-woo)
- Lovebird (앵앵; Korean: Hong Seung-hyo (giant)/ Park Si-yoon (baby))
- Grandma Mago (마고할멈; Korean: Kim Hyun-sim)
- Queen of the East (동쪽 여왕; Korean: Yang Jeong-hwa)

== Animation ==
Goblin Hill
- Promotional poster
- Country of origin: South Korea
- Original language: Korean
- No. of seasons: 1
- No. of episodes: 30

Production
- Production company: Soul Creative

Original release
- Network: Tooniverse
- Release: July 21, 2021 – February 16, 2022

Goblin Hill is a South Korean animated series based on the webtoon of the same name, premiering on Tooniverse in South Korea from July 21, 2021, to February 16, 2022.

=== Episodes ===
No.	Title	Original release date
1	"Garam's strange birthday" Transliteration: "Galam-iui isanghan saeng-il" (Korean: 가람이의 이상한 생일)	July 21, 2021
2	"Castle of Queen of the East"; Transliteration: "Dongjjog yeowang-ui seong" (Korean: 동쪽 여왕의 성)	July 21, 2021
3	"Mysterious Transfer Student Laura"; Transliteration: "Sinbihan jeonhagsaeng Lola" (Korean: 신비한 전학생 로라)	July 28, 2021
4	"My heart is pounding, Hyeonhwa-ok"; Transliteration: "Dugeundugeun hohwan-og" (Korean: 두근두근 호환옥)	August 4, 2021
5	"Appear! Wolf Warrior Sirang"; Transliteration: "Deungjang! Neugdaejeonsa silang" (Korean: 등장! 늑대전사 시랑)	August 11, 2021
6	"Chase in the forest" Transliteration: "Supsog-ui chugyeogjeon" (Korean: 숲속의 추격전)	August 18, 2021
7	"Baby Lovebird"; Transliteration: "Agi Aeng-aeng" (Korean: 아기 앵앵)	August 25, 2021
8	"Attack of Seosaengwon"; Transliteration: "Seosaeng-won-ui Seubgyeog" (Korean: 서생원의 습격)	September 1, 2021
9	"Run turtle" Transliteration: "Dallyeola geobug-i" (Korean: 달려라 거북이)	September 8, 2021
10	"The adventure begins!" Transliteration: "Moheom-i sijagdoeda!" (Korean: 모험이 시작되다!)	September 15, 2021
11	"To the endless canyon!" Transliteration: "Mugan-ui hyeobgog-eulo!" (Korean: 무간의 협곡으로!)	September 29, 2021
12	"Pinocking and Zepeta!"; Transliteration: "Pinoking-gwa Jepeta!" (Korean: 피노킹과 제페타!)	October 6, 2021
13	"Mosquitori's counterattack!" Transliteration: "Moseukwittoliui yeogseub!" (Korean: 모스퀴또리의 역습!)	October 13, 2021
14	"Fruit of life" Transliteration: "Saengmyeong-ui yeolmae" (Korean: 생명의 열매)	October 20, 2021
15	"Wolf kingdom" Transliteration: "Neugdae wang-gug" (Korean: 늑대 왕국)	October 27, 2021
16	"Sirang's past" Transliteration: "Silang-ui gwageo" (Korean: 시랑의 과거)	November 3, 2021
17	"Sirang and Unju"; Transliteration: "Silang-gwa Unju" (Korean: 시랑과 운주)	November 10, 2021
18	"Emerging truth" Transliteration: "Tteooleuneun jinsil" (Korean: 떠오르는 진실)	November 17, 2021
19	"Sirang VS Four Heavenly Kings!"; Transliteration: "Silang VS Sacheon-wang pa!" (Korean: 시랑 VS 사천왕 파!)	November 24, 2021
20	"Geumgang History!"; Transliteration: "Geumgang-yeogsa pa!" (Korean: 금강역사 파!)	December 1, 2021
21	"Lovebird's Secret"; Transliteration: "Aeng-aeng-iui bimil" (Korean: 앵앵이의 비밀)	December 8, 2021
22	"Adventure in the snow" Transliteration: "Nun sog-ui moheom" (Korean: 눈 속의 모험)	December 15, 2021
23	"In Snow Country Canyon"; Transliteration: "Seolgug hyeobgog-eseo" (Korean: 설국 협곡에서)	December 22, 2021
24	"Moonshine mirror" Transliteration: "Munsyain mileo" (Korean: 문샤인 미러)	December 29, 2021
25	"Canyon of mud" Transliteration: "Jinheulg-ui hyeobgog" (Korean: 진흙의 협곡)	January 5, 2022
26	"Laura's past" Transliteration: "Lolaui gwageo" (Korean: 로라의 과거)	January 12, 2022
27	"Battle of Mud Canyon"; Transliteration: "Jinheulg hyeobgog-ui jeontu" (Korean: 진흙 협곡의 전투)	January 19, 2022
28	"Toad king" Transliteration: "Dukkeobi wang" (Korean: 두꺼비 왕)	January 26, 2022
29	"The Resurrection of the Imoogi"; Transliteration: "Imugiui buhwal" (Korean: 이무기의 부활)	February 9, 2022
30	"Moonshine Garam"; Transliteration: "Munsyain galam" (Korean: 문샤인 가람)	February 16, 2022
