= Hidden Face =

2024 South Korean film by Kim Dae-woo

- Theatrical release poster
- Hangul: 히든페이스
- RR: Hideun peiseu
- MR: Hidŭn p'eisŭ
- Directed by: Kim Dae-woo
- Screenplay by: Roh Deok; Hong Eun-mi
- Based on: The Hidden Face by Andrés Baiz
- Produced by: Lee Seung-won; Seo Ho-jin; Seo Dong-wook; Choi Pyeong-ho
- Starring: Song Seung-heon; Cho Yeo-jeong; Park Ji-hyun
- Cinematography: Kim Dong-young
- Edited by: Kim Seon-min
- Music by: Lee Jae-jin
- Production companies: Studio&NEW; Void Co. Ltd. Solaire Partners by K-Wave Media
- Distributed by: Next Entertainment World
- Release date: November 20, 2024 (South Korea)
- Running time: 115 minutes
- Country: South Korea
- Language: Korean
- Box office: US$6.5 million

Hidden Face (Korean: 히든페이스) is a 2024 South Korean erotic mystery thriller film directed by Kim Dae-woo, starring Song Seung-heon, Cho Yeo-jeong, and Park Ji-hyun. It is a remake of the 2011 Spanish-Colombian film The Hidden Face. The film was released theatrically on November 20, 2024, and it went on becoming the first Korean R-rated film to surpasses 1 million viewers during local theatrical release since 2019.

== Plot ==
Conductor Seong-jin leads an orchestra where his fiancée, Soo-yeon, serves as a cellist. One day, Soo-yeon disappears, leaving behind only a video message.

Seong-jin is devastated by the loss of Soo-yeon, but finds himself drawn irresistibly to Mi-joo, the cellist who replaces her. On a rainy night, consumed by their desires, Seong-jin and Mi-joo commit an unforgivable act in Soo-yeon's home.

Meanwhile, Soo-yeon, thought to be missing, is trapped in a sealed room from which escape is impossible, forced to witness the hidden truths unfold.

== Cast ==
- Song Seung-heon as Seong-jin
- Cho Yeo-jeong as Shin Soo-yeon
- Park Ji-hyun as Kim Mi-joo
- Park Ji-young as Hye-yeon
- Park Sung-geun as office manager
- Cha Mi-kyung as Seong-jin's mother

== Production ==
=== Filming ===
Principal photography started in May 2022 and concluded in July 2022.

== Music ==
The movie features the following compositions.

- Franze Peter Schubert's
  - "Unfinished" Symphony No. 8 in B Minor D. 759,
  - "Arpeggione" Sonata in a Minor D.821
  - "Impromptu" No. 3 In G Flat Major Op.90 D.899
- Carl Maria von Weber's "Der Freischütz" Hunters' Chorus Op.77 J.277
- Sangnam Lee & PKM Gallery's The Fortress of Sense (S 326)
- Sangsu Park's Gaspard de la Nuit and Vision Fugitive
- Yonghyun Lee's The Man Who Made Me Crush and Self Portrait
- Shin Dain's Small Hole Series

== Reception ==
=== Box office ===
As of December 24, 2024, Hidden Face has grossed $6,536,512 with a running total of 1,006,777 tickets sold. The film became the first Korean R-rated film to surpasses 1 million viewers during Korean theatrical release since 2019. On December 24, 2024, the film's revenue had approached break-even point.

=== Accolades ===
Award	Year	Category	Recipient(s)	Result	Ref.
Baeksang Arts Awards	2025	Best Actress	Cho Yeo-jeong	Nominated	
Baeksang Arts Awards	2025	Best New Actress	Park Ji-hyun	Nominated	
Blue Dragon Film Awards	2025	Best Supporting Actress	Park Ji-hyun	Won	
Korean Film Producers Association Awards	2025	Best Supporting Actress	Park Ji-hyun	Won	
