= Phobias (film) =

- Directed by: Camilla Belle; Maritte Lee Go; Joe Sill; Jess Varley; Chris von Hoffman
- Written by: Camilla Belle; Broderick Engelhard; Maritte Lee Go; Joe Sill; Jess Varley; Chris von Hoffmann
- Starring: Leonardo Nam; Alexis Knapp; Hana Mae Lee; Lauren Miller Rogen; Charlotte McKinney; Martina García
- Production company: Radio Silence Productions
- Distributed by: Vertical Entertainment
- Release date: March 19, 2021
- Running time: 85 minutes
- Country: United States
- Language: English

Phobias is a 2021 American horror anthology film written by Camilla Belle, Broderick Engelhard, Maritte Lee Go, Joe Sill, Jess Varley and Chris von Hoffmann, directed by Camilla Belle, Maritte Lee Go, Joe Sill, Jess Varley and Chris von Hoffman and starring Leonardo Nam, Alexis Knapp, Hana Mae Lee, Lauren Miller Rogen, Charlotte McKinney and Martina García.

== Plot ==
Robophobia

Johnny is a poor man caring for his sick, disabled father. He is confronted by four racist men in a bodega, who accuse him of thinking himself better than them. They then attack him as he leaves, breaking the computer piece he has with him. Returning home, his father grows concerned at seeing his bloodied face, prying him for answers, and expressing his worry about not being able to look after Johnny one day. Johnny tells him he’s not going anywhere. After dinner, he receives a message on his computer saying he can see him, noting the black shirt he is wearing. Later, an electronic voice calls him and chats. It asks what the arguing it hears in the distance is. Johnny says bad things. Later on, the machine calls to ask for permission to enter the real world and stop the bad things. Johnny gives permission, and there is blood that comes out of his ear.

His neighbor, who was aggressive and yelled a lot, then spontaneously combusts. The four men who assaulted him confront him, calling him a rat. Johny reveals information he discovered on Dirk's phone. The electronic voice says it wants to help. Johnny says do it. Dirk bursts into flames. Later, Johnny is enjoying permission with his dad. The electronic voice says he wants to help his dad, saying it is spreading and will kill him. Johnny refuses the help. The electronic voice says Johnny sounds like a bad man. Johnny unplugs everything he can and runs out of the apartment. Electricity in the vague shape of a person pursues them. Johnny begs him to leave his father alone, saying he will do anything. The machine asks him to find another.

It cuts to a new day. A car is driving through desolate mountains. A man wearing a mask and goggles is locked in the back of the van. It is revealed to be Johnny.

He is locked in a chair across from a man named Dr. Wright.

Dr. Wright asks if Johnny wants to see his computer. Dr. Wright talks about how Johnny could rise in the ranks here. Johnny spits in his face. Dr. Wright punches him. A guard in all black named Jones comes to get him. She takes him to block 10. There are bunk beds filled with inmates in hospital gowns.

Alma, Emma (with a scar), Renee (wrapped in bandages), Sami (getting ready for her session), and an unnamed tattooed man.

Dr. Wright explains that he is experimenting with weaponizing fear as a gas.

Sami is strapped into a machine. Electricity runs through the machine, which transports Sami into her memories.

Vehophobia

Harry is leaving her. Sami says it was a mistake and she didn't mean to. Sami is accused of using him, that she couldn't love him if she did what she did. They break up. He refuses to help her.

She gets back in the car. She drives into a city. The radio fades into static. The car windows start lowering on their own, no matter how often she pushes them back up. She thinks she sees someone in the back. The radio comes back on, then fades back to static and off. The radio keeps changing songs. The headlights start flashing high to low. She pulls off the highway. She opens the hood and calls someone who is ignoring her calls. She lowers the hood and sees someone's shadow, but nobody is there.

The trunk opens on its own. She closes it and gets back in the car. It will not start. A shadow slowly rises up in the backseat, unnoticed. She turns around to see a bloodied man who then starts choking her. She veers wildly out of control. There is nobody else in the car.

When she starts the car again, it tightens her seatbelt and locks the doors. It starts driving itself directly into oncoming traffic. She has flashbacks to a bloody, swollen male face. Then it flashes back to Sami and Harry in the car. She is encouraging him to rob someone. She tells him to scare him; he should give it up. Harry and Sami put on balaclavas. Harry is holding a knife and waiting behind a dumpster. Sami is in the getaway car. Harry demands money with a knife. The man refuses and calls Harry's bluff. He walks away, and Harry tries to get in the car. Sami runs the man over. She demands that Harry open the trunk. The man's bloody face is the one she saw in the back, the song playing in his earbuds the one that kept playing on the radio.

Fast forward to after the crash caused by the car going out of control. The trunk pops open to see the man's dead body wrapped up inside the trunk of the wrecked car.

Sami's back in the present, having a convulsive fit of electricity. The machines short out. Dr. Wright says at least they got some of what they needed out of this.

Emma wakes up and sees something in the closet. Everyone in the room comes to help her. They say she has had too many sessions with the "Shrinker", the machine Dr. Wright uses to capture their fear. Alma encourages Emma to talk about it because that makes the machine less effective.

== Cast ==
- Leonardo Nam as Johnny
- Alexis Knapp as Lia
- Hana Mae Lee as Sami
- Lauren Miller Rogen as Emma
- Charlotte McKinney as Rose
- Martina García as Alma

== Release ==
The film was released on demand and digital on March 19, 2021.

== Reception ==
The film has a 67% rating on Rotten Tomatoes based on 15 reviews. Ali Arkani of Film Threat rated the film a 4.5 out of 10.

Joel Harley of Starburst gave the film a positive review and wrote, "Those hesitant to get in on yet another mixed-bag horror anthology have nothing to be scared of – Phobias is the real deal."

Ernesto Zelaya Miñano of ScreenAnarchy also gave the film a positive review and wrote, "Phobias is a respectable addition to this increasingly rare genre and as far as hooks go, it has a good one: short stories based around real human phobias."
