= Martina García =

Colombian actress

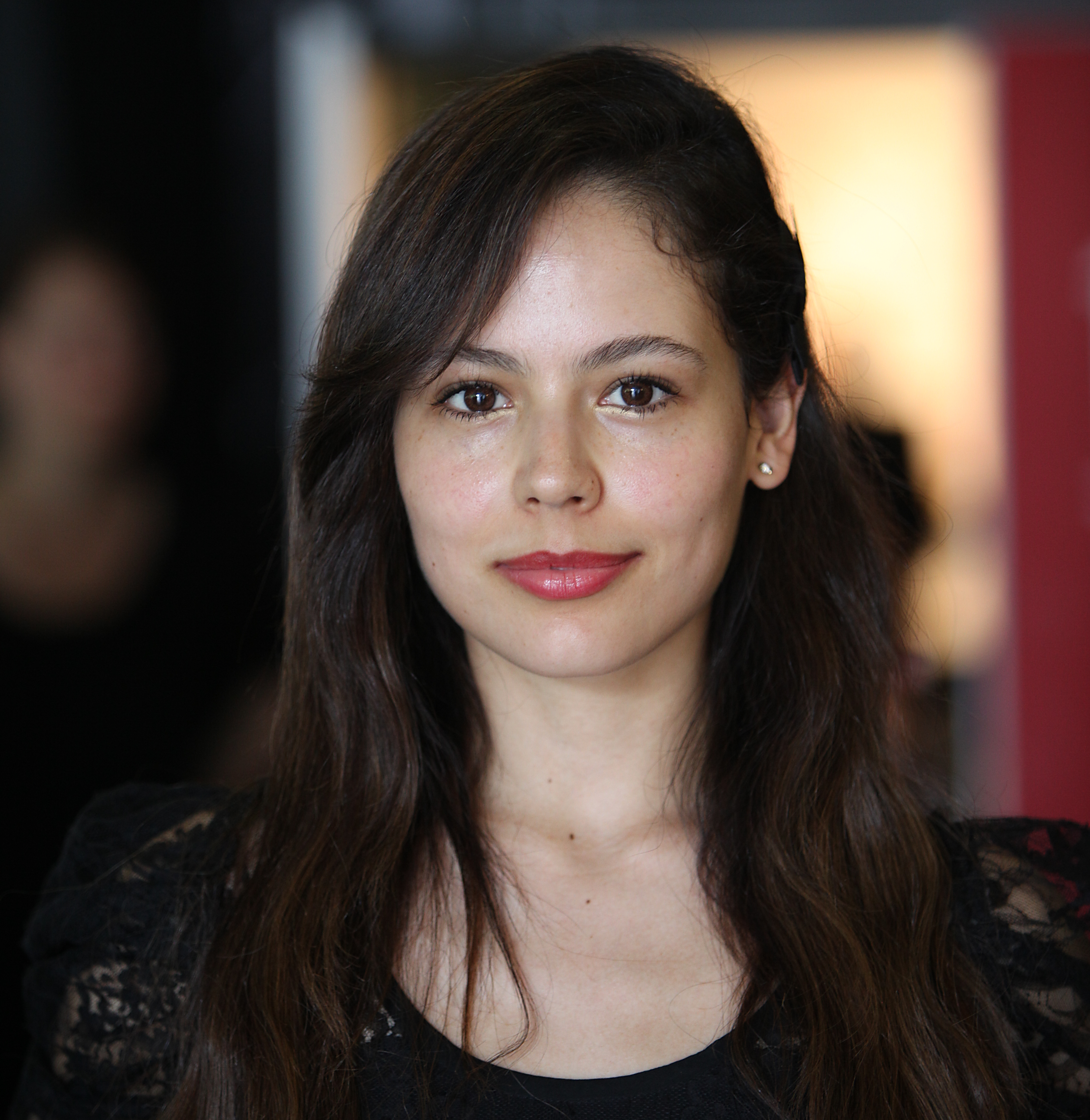
- Martina García in 2010
- Born: Bogotá, Colombia
- Occupations: Model, film and television actress

Martina García is a Colombian model, film and television actress. She is best known for her roles as Maritza in the second season of the Netflix crime drama Narcos (2016), and in the Spanish-Colombian movie The Hidden Face (La cara oculta). She also had a role in the third season of Homeland (2013).

== Filmography ==
- 1999: La guerra de las rosas (TV series)
- 2002: María madrugada (TV series)
- 2003: Amor a la plancha (TV series)
- 2004: Perder es cuestión de método
- 2004: La Saga, Negocio de Familia (TV series)
- 2007: Satanás
- 2007: Pura sangre (TV series)
- 2007: Mujeres asesinas (TV series)
- 2008: Tiempo final (TV series)
- 2008: Plan América (TV series, all episodes)
- 2009: Amar a morir
- 2009: Rage
- 2009: Día naranja
- 2010: No eres tú, soy yo
- 2010: La mosquitera
- 2011: La cara oculta
- 2011: El sexo débil (TV series)
- 2012: Operation E
- 2013: Homeland (TV series, 1 episode)
- 2014: ABCs of Death 2
- 2016: Narcos (TV series, 5 episodes)
- 2016: Backseat Fighter
- 2016: Blanca (TV series, 10 episodes)
- 2019: The Best Is Yet to Come
- 2021: Phobias (Movie)
- 2022: All Those Things We Never Said (TV series; 9 episodes)
- 2022: No fue mi culpa: Colombia (TV series; 7 episodes)
- 2024: Dear Paris (Movie)
- 2025: Trauma (Short)
