= Forbidden Fairytale =

2025 film by Lee Jong-seok

- Theatrical release poster
- Hangul: 동화지만 청불입니다
- Lit.: It's a fairy tale, but it's paid
- RR: Donghwajiman cheongburimnida
- MR: Tonghwajiman ch'ŏngburimnida
- Directed by: Lee Jong-seok
- Starring: Park Ji-hyun; Choi Si-won; Sung Dong-il
- Production companies: Golddog Entertainment Co., Ltd.; Soojak Film Co., Ltd.
- Distributed by: (South Korea) Special Movie City, Media Can; Barunson E&A (international)
- Release date: 8 January 2025
- Running time: 109 minutes
- Country: South Korea
- Language: Korean
- Box office: US$1.1 million

Forbidden Fairytale (Korean: 동화지만 청불입니다) is a 2025 South Korean romantic comedy film directed by Lee Jong-seok and starring Park Ji-hyun as Danbi. It follows Danbi, who dreams of being a children's book writer but is in reality a rookie on the illegal pornography crackdown team. It also stars Choi Si-won and Sung Dong-il in pivotal roles.

It was released in South Korea on 8 January 2025.

== Synopsis ==
During the day, Dan-bi works on the youth protection team, reviewing endless streams of adult content. At night, she pours her creativity into writing for a fairy tale competition. Her life takes an unexpected turn when she accidentally damages the vintage car of a CEO who runs an adult web novel publishing company. To repay him, she reluctantly agrees to write adult fiction each evening. However, this arrangement doesn't last long as Dan-bi's distinctive storytelling style breathes life into the sexual fantasies of three friends, quickly turning her into an overnight sensation. Meanwhile, her captivating stories spark an unexpected awakening in her colleague, Jung-seok, who has struggled with sexual dysfunction for years.

== Cast ==
- Park Ji-hyun as Danbi
- Choi Si-won as Jeong-seok
- Sung Dong-il as Representative Hwang

== Production ==
Principal photography began on 20 May 2023. By March 2024, the film had entered its post-production phase.

== Release ==
Forbidden Fairytale premiered in South Korean theaters on 8 January 2025 released by Media Can (Fillcon Media) and Special Movie City.

Barunson E&A has purchased the marketing rights of the film for overseas sales in March 2024.

The film is selected at the 24th New York Asian Film Festival to be held from July 11 to 27, 2025, for its North American Premiere. It had its first screening on July 13 at Lincoln Center.

== Reception ==
=== Box office ===
The film was released on January 8, 2025 on 668 screens. It opened at first place among new releases with 23,430 running audiences. During its opening weekend, the film ranked third, drawing 65,568 viewers and achieving a cumulative total of 101,770 viewers.

As of January 27, 2025, the film has grossed US$1,069,672 from 165,719 admissions.

=== Critical response ===
Ryu Ji-yoon writing for Dailyan appreciated the visual presentation of the adult web novels. She praised the portrayal of Danbi by Park Ji-hyun, writing, "her stable acting stands out, as Danbi's emotions do not stray into extreme sadness or despair, but rather lead to internal maturity". Ryu Ji-yoon found the end boring but again she opined that Park Ji-hyun's as Danbi and "her determination to liberate her emotions and passion for creation and take a new path stands out".
