= Choi Kyung-hoon =

South Korean actor (born 1993)

- Born: April 9, 1993 (age 33); South Korea
- Education: Dongguk University
- Occupation: Actor
- Years active: 2019–present
- Agent: Spring ENT

Korean name
- Hangul: 최경훈
- RR: Choe Gyeonghun
- MR: Ch'oe Kyŏnghun
- Website: springent.co.kr/bbs/board.php?bo_table=artist&wr_id=24

Choi Kyung-hoon (Korean: 최경훈; born April 9, 1993) is a South Korean actor. He made his acting debut in the 2019 web series True Ending.

== Early life ==
Choi was born on April 9, 1993. He graduated from Dongguk University's Department of Theater and Film.

== Career ==
In 2020, Choi signed an exclusive contract with Artist Company. In 2025, Choi signed with Spring ENT.

== Filmography ==
=== Television series ===
Year	Title	Role	Ref.
2021–2022	Snowdrop		
2022	Ode to Our Youth	Han Tae-young	
2023	The Matchmakers	Yoon Bo-gyeom	
2024–2025	The Tale of Lady Ok	Lee Deok-hun	
2026	See You at Work Tomorrow!	Cho Ga-eul	

=== Web series ===
Year	Title	Role	Notes	Ref.
2019–2020	True Ending	Suho	Acting debut	
2020	Romance, Talking	Choi Hyun-woo		
2020	Trap	Gyeongwoo		
2020	Legally, Dad	Seol Yoo-sang		
2021	Re-Feel: If Only	Cha Se-jung		

=== Music video appearances ===
Year	Title	Artist	Ref.
2020	Word	Limit	

== Discography ==
=== Soundtrack appearances ===
List of soundtrack appearances, showing year released, and name of the album
Title	Year	Album	Ref.
"Like a Cat" (고양이처럼) (Note: Credited as Jo Gaeul)	2026	See You at Work Tomorrow! OST	
"What Matters" (중요한 건)	2026	See You at Work Tomorrow! OST	
