= Dynamo (production company) =

Colombian production company

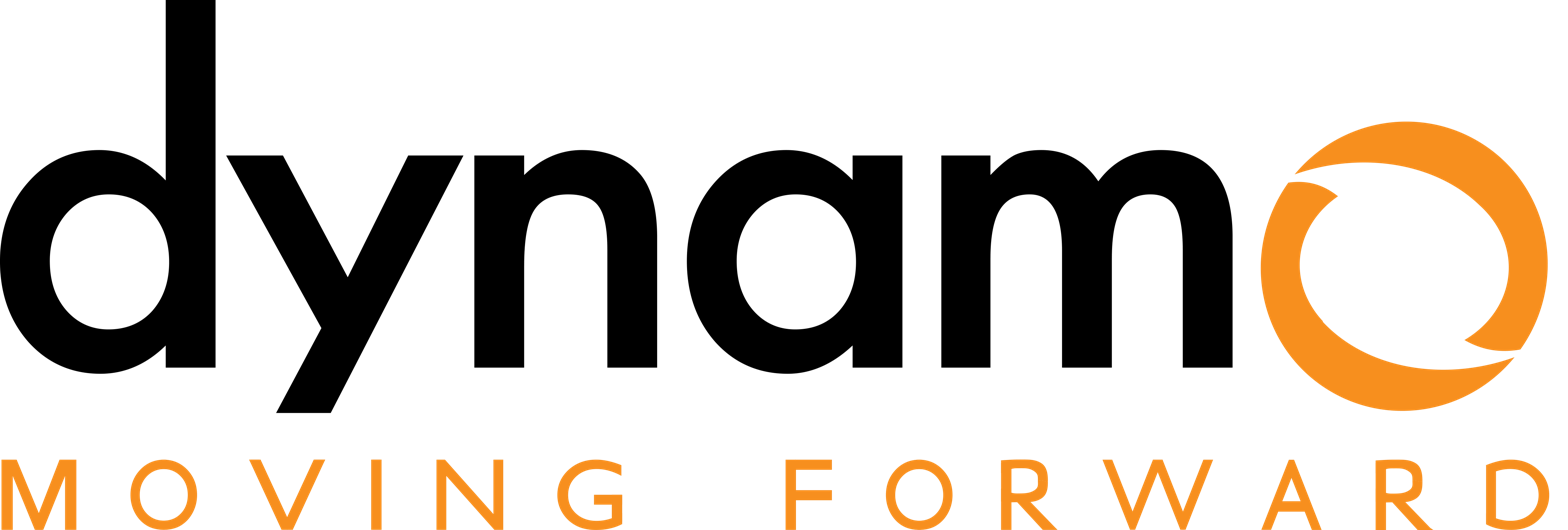
- Industry: Entertainment
- Founded: 2006; 20 years ago
- Website: https://dynamo.net/en/

Dynamo is a Colombian production company. Founded in 2006, it has produced films including as The Hidden Face, Undertow and One Hundred Years of Solitude. It also assisted in the production of Narcos and American Made.

Aside from Colombia, the company has offices in Spain, Mexico and New York. As of 2017, it had produced over 30 feature movies.
