= Timing (manhwa) =

2006 manhwa series by Kang Full

- cover

타이밍 RR: Taiming MR: T'aiming
- Genre: Science fiction, thriller
- Author: Kang Full
- Publisher: Munhak Segyesa
- Original run: 2006
- Volumes: 3

Timing (Korean: 타이밍) is a South Korean science fiction thriller manhwa series written and illustrated by Kang Full. Started in June 2005, this webtoon manhwa was released on Daum. The print publication of the first volume of Timing was released on August 5, 2006. The webtoon has been adapted into a film of the same name.

== Synopsis ==
Kang Full's Timing is set in an unidentified city that is under a vague threat; a high school student committed suicide for no apparent reason and children are generally scared. A group of people with supernatural powers appear on the scene to put an end to the silent threat. The concept has been compared to that of X-Men and Heroes and has a fairly American style to it. Timing features a student that can freeze time, a salaryman who has the ability to turn back time for ten seconds, a fast-food employee who can predict the next ten minutes, and a teacher whose dreams serve as premonitions for what is to come. Sara Lawi of Orient-Extrême described Timing as a "deliberately simplistic" thriller.

== Development ==
Kang took suggestions from his readership to determine the direction of Timing's story.

== Characters ==
- Park Ja-gi
- Kim Young-tak
- Kang Min-hyuk
- Jang Se-yoon
- Baek Ki-hyung
- Yang Sung-sik

== Adaptations ==
In 2010, production on an animated film adaptation for Timing started. The film was originally scheduled to be released in 2012, but it was shelved for sponsorship reasons. The animated film eventually premiered in October 2014, when it was shown at the 19th Busan International Film Festival. This adaptation of Timing is directed by Min Kyung-jo, produced by Hyoin Entertainment, and features the voices of Park Ji-yoon, Um Sang-hyun, Ryu Seung-gon, Yeo Min-jeong, Sim Gyu-hyuk, and Sung Wan-kyung. Timing was also shown at the 17th Seoul International Cartoon and Animation Festival in May 2015, where it won the grand prize. The film was officially released in South Korea on December 10, 2015.

In Moving, Kim Young-tak made a special appearance.

In Light Shop, Park Jeong-min made a special appearance as Kim Young-tak.
