= Apt. (film) =

2006 South Korean horror film

APT
- Theatrical poster
- Hangul: 아파트
- RR: Apateu
- MR: Ap'at'ŭ
- Directed by: Ahn Byeong-ki
- Written by: Ahn Byeong-ki; Lee So-yeong
- Based on: APT by Kang Full
- Produced by: Ahn Byeong-ki
- Starring: Ko So-young; Kang Sung-jin; Jang Hee-jin; Park Ha-sun; Yoo Min
- Cinematography: Yun Myeong-sik
- Edited by: Kim Sun-min
- Music by: Oh Bong-jun
- Production companies: Toilet Pictures; IM Pictures Corp. Mirovision
- Distributed by: Showbox
- Release date: July 6, 2006
- Running time: 90 minutes
- Country: South Korea
- Language: Korean
- Budget: $3,500,000
- Box office: $3,362,511

APT (Korean: 아파트; RR: Apateu) (released as 9:56 in Singapore) is a 2006 South Korean horror film, directed, produced, and written by Ahn Byeong-ki and starring Ko So-young. It is based on a webtoon by Kang Full. The name APT is from the English word meaning apartment. The film had 644,893 admissions nationwide.

== Plot ==
Se-jin Oh, a lonely young career woman, lives in a high-rise apartment building in a Seoul suburb, and sometimes watches her neighbors through binoculars for amusement. Taking the subway home one night near Christmas, a woman dressed in red throws herself in front of the train, attempting to drag Se-jin with her. The dead woman haunts Se-jin, though she doesn't know it. However, she does notice that the lights across the way flicker mysteriously at exactly 9:56pm every night—often accompanied by an apparent suicide.

Se-jin is befriended by Yoo-yeon, a woman who uses a wheelchair and is abused by her caregivers, several of whom are among the victims. Yoo-yeon gives Se-jin a puzzle cube, noting it can help to forget the pain for a while. Se-jin attempts to influence her neighbors, begging them to not turn their lights off before 10 pm. This puts her in conflict with police detective Yang, who learns that many of the victims have identical keys to an apartment. The apartment that matches the key, 704, is Yoo-yeon's -- but Yang finds the resident is Shin Jung-soo, a social recluse with long black hair, who attacks Yang, but denies having committed any murders.

Se-jin has also made friends with a student, Jung-hong, whose parents leave her behind when they go out of town. Se-jin passes the puzzle cube on to Jung-hong, who notices that the tiles always go back to their original configuration. Looking at the cube, Se-jin realises the numbers inscribed on the tiles match up to the apartment numbers of the known victims, save one. They also find an article that notes Yoo-yeon committed suicide a year ago. Se-jin goes to apartment 1203 to investigate, finding another dead person, with a key to 704 in their mouth. In the apartment, Se-jin relives Yoo-Yeon's experiences, as the recluse relates them to Yang: orphaned when her parents died in a car wreck, Yoo-yeon's neighbors voluntarily decide to care for her, but over time come to hate and maltreat her, including attempted rape and assorted physical abuse. Yoo-Yeon takes her own life, her blood turning her dress completely red, but her spirit remains.

Terrified to go back to the apartment, Shin Jung-soo kills himself with an officer's gun. Jung-hong sees her parents have come home, but as it is close to 9:56 she races to keep them from being hurt. Meanwhile, Yoo-yeon confronts Se-jin, threatening to kill her for turning away from her like the others. Se-jin escapes to the roof, but is followed by Yoo-yeon; to end her hatred and pain, Se-jin allows Yoo-Yeon to take her over, and jumps from the roof, witnessed by Yang and Jung-hong.

Two months later, Jung-hong helps Detective Yang move into an apartment in the same building. They see an apparition of Se-jin, and then the lights flicker; it's 9:56 pm.

== Cast ==
- Ko So-young - Oh Se-jin
- Kang Sung-jin - Detective Yang Na-sun
- Jang Hee-jin - Yu-jeon
- Park Ha-sun - Jung-hong
- Kim Dong-wook - Shin Jung-soo
- Yoo Min - suicidal woman at the subway
