= Kang Full =

South Korean webtoon artist (born 1974)

- 강풀
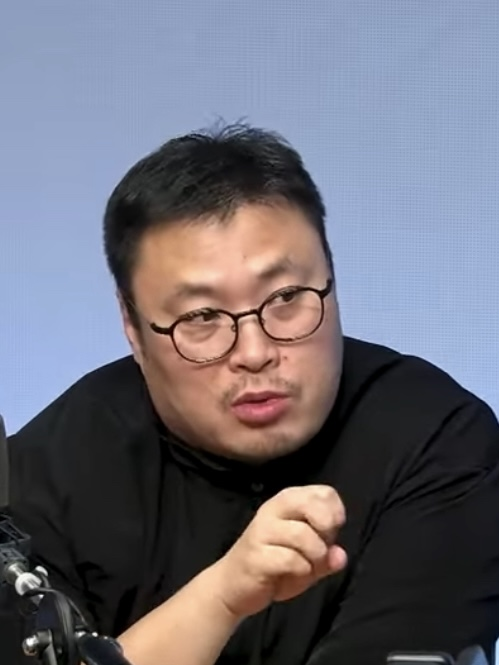
- Kang in 2023
- Born: Kang Do-young; December 7, 1974 (age 51); Seoul, South Korea
- Other name: Kang Pool
- Education: Sangji University (Bachelor of Korean Language and Literature)
- Years active: 1997–present
- Organization: Korea Cartoonists Association
- Notable work: Pure Love Comic; I Love You; Moving
- Spouse: undisclosed (m. 2006)
- Children: 1 (daughter)

Korean name
- Hangul: 강도영
- Hanja: 康道永
- RR: Gang Doyeong
- MR: Kang Toyŏng

Pen name
- Hangul: 강풀
- RR: Gang Pul
- MR: Kang P'ul

Kang Do-yeong (Korean: 강도영; born December 7, 1974), better known as Kang Full or Kang Pool (강풀), is a South Korean webtoon artist and screenwriter. His works have been adapted into a variety of movies, dramas, and plays. Film adaptations include APT, BA:BO, Hello, Schoolgirl, Late Blossom, Pained, The Neighbor, and 26 Years. He gained wider international recognition for the Disney+ original series Moving (2023), which he wrote based on his 2015 webtoon.

Kang began his career as a cartoonist in 1997, serializing comic reviews in Yeongseo Newspaper, then in 2002, began publishing his cartoons on his personal website. He is one of the first-generation webtoon artists in South Korea.

== Early life and education ==
Kang Do-yeong was born on December 7, 1974, in Seoul, is the son of a pastor. He moved to the Gangdong District, Seoul at age two and has lived there ever since.

While pursuing a degree in Korean Language and Literature at Sangji University, Kang was known for frequently wearing green clothing, leading to the nickname "Kang Full," derived from the Korean word "pul" (풀) meaning "grass."

Despite lacking formal art training, Kang started creating comic-style posters for the student body as he found them more effective than text-based ads. Kang's interest in the medium developed after encountering the work of cartoonist Park Jae-dong. Reflecting on his beginnings, Kang stated: "I thought cartoons were so fun, and I started drawing as a cartoonist in school. By the time I graduated, I had become so fond of cartoons that I thought of it as a career. However, I had no intention of becoming a current affairs cartoonist. I prefer creating stories. Even now, I have the most fun thinking up stories before serializing them."

== Career ==
=== 1997–2001: Early career ===
Kang began his career as a cartoonist in 1997 under his birth name, Kang Do-yeong. He served as a contributor for the Wonju Yeongseo Newspaper. His early work faced limited commercial success. Of the two publishers that showed interest in his series, one went bankrupt during serialization. During this period, he published work intermittently in various magazines and sports newspapers.

=== 2002: Transition to digital format and breakthrough ===
After working briefly as an illustrator for Weekly Toto, Kang resigned to focus on digital publishing. (Note: There are conflicting reports regarding the specific timing of Kang's online debut. Some sources indicate that it took place in April 2002, while others suggest it occurred in June 2002.) In 2002, he launched his personal website, kangfull.com, where he began serializing his debut webtoon, Everyday Matters (일쌍다반사). The series utilized a daily comic strip format centered on observational humor. Kang has stated that his move to online platforms was driven by a lack of interest from traditional publishers and a preference for long form storytelling over technical draftsmanship. He is often recognized as a first generation webtoon artist who helped define the narrative structure of the medium during an era when web based comics typically consisted of short, essay style strips.

By July 2002, Kang's website averaged 10,000 daily visitors, making it one of the most popular personal sites in South Korea.[5] This digital presence led to regular features in outlets such as Ddanji Daily, JoongAng Ilbo, and Sports Today, along with collaborations with the Korea Teachers and Education Workers' Union. On October 28, 2002, he published Unwavering Question Mark through Yeoreumsol, a print compilation of his online and new works. In late 2002, Kang signed with Daum to produce the movie review comic Let's Have Fun with Movies. After its conclusion, he joined the newly established Daum Manhwa-sok-sesang, the precursor to Daum Webtoon. Although the platform initially emphasized political commentary and essay style comics, Kang departed from these trends to develop a long form, fictional narrative format.

=== 2003–2013: Serialized webtoons ===
Kang serialized Pure Love Comics on Daum from August 2003 to April 2004. The series averaged 2 million daily page views and reached a total of 60 million views by its conclusion. It was subsequently published as a two volume print manhwa and served as the basis for a 2008 film adaptation. The work demonstrated the viability of webtoons as One Source Multi-Use (OSMU) content. In November 2004, Kang signed a 10 million yen (approximately 100 million won) publishing deal with Japan's Futabasha, which marked a record for South Korean comic exports at the time.

In May 2004, he released the horror thriller Apartment, which follows an unemployed man living in a mysterious apartment complex. A film adaptation directed by Ahn Byeong-ki, titled Apt., was released in 2006. The film featured actress Ko So-young in her return to cinema and altered the protagonist's gender from the original webtoon. These early adaptations are credited with establishing the commercial viability of webtoons as source material for other media.

Between November 2004 and April 2005, Kang serialized the romance webtoon Babo, which centers on a mentally disabled man and his relationships with his sister and a childhood friend. The work was later adapted into a 2008 film starring Cha Tae-hyun and Ha Ji-won. In June 2005, Kang started writing supernatural fiction with the serialization of Timing. The story follows four individuals with unique temporal abilities (time stopping, rewinding, and precognition) who work together to prevent a series of deaths at a high school. Timing was Kang's first venture into the supernatural thriller genre and laid the groundwork for the "Kang Full universe." The series was released in print in August 2006 and adapted into an animated feature film of the same name in 2015.

In 2006, Kang's influence on the South Korean film industry with webtoon Pure Love Comics, Fool, Apartment, and Timing, were simultaneously in development for film adaptations. From April 10 to September 28, he serialized 26 Years, fictional thriller focusing on the offspring of individuals affected by the 1980 Gwangju Uprising who plot to assassinate former President Chun Doo-hwan. Kang considers 26 Years to be the most personally significant work of his career due to its historical and political themes. The webtoon was eventually adapted into a feature film 26 Years after years of production delays.

In 2007, Kang serialized the third installment of his romance series, I Love You (also known as Late Blossom), which focused on the relationship between an elderly milk delivery man and a woman who collects recyclables. The series was a commercial success on Daum, with monthly views growing from 2.7 million to over 6.3 million. It was later adapted into a 2011 film and a 2012 television series. Kang's success as a storyteller also led to his role as a screenwriter for major film productions. He was announced as the writer for the 3D sequel to Bong Joon-ho's 2006 film The Host in June 2007. Despite a high-profile announcement and a $12 million budget, the project faced production delays and was never realized in its original form. Kang then moved on to other serialized webtoon projects.

From June 9 to October 29, 2008, Kang serialized the mystery thriller The Neighbor. The plot centers on residents of an apartment building who begin to suspect a serial killer lives among them, exploring themes of social apathy. A 2012 film adaptation starring Kim Yoon-jin and Ma Dong-seok became a commercial success, drawing 2.4 million viewers. By the end of 2008, Kang's collected works had surpassed 300 million cumulative page views on the Daum platform.

In 2009, he released Again, the fourth installment in his "Mystery Psychological Anecdote" series. The story introduces a conflict between immortal beings and characters with temporal or telekinetic abilities. Again functions as a pivotal narrative link within the "Kang Full Universe," integrating the characters and supernatural elements established in his earlier work, Timing, into a broader shared continuity.

In August 2010, Kang began serializing Every Moment of Your Life (also known as Your Every Moment) on Daum's 'Manhwa-sok-sesang' platform. The series, which ran for six months, reached a total of 150 million views and averaged 2 million daily visitors. Departing from traditional romance, the story is set during a 2012 zombie outbreak in Seoul and follows a protagonist attempting to rescue his family from the city. The work was noted for blending the horror and romance genres, focusing on the emotional impact of the apocalypse.

From August 8 to December 6, 2011, Kang serialized the horror-mystery webtoon Lighting Store on Daum. The narrative focuses on a mysterious shop located at the end of a dark alleyway, which acts as a transition point for souls between life and death. Kang has acknowledged that Lighting Store is among his most complex works, noting that he intentionally moved away from his usual detailed exposition to allow for more reader interpretation. He suggested that while the plot contains various supernatural vignettes, the overarching emotional core is a woman’s reflection on love and loss. The series was highly successful and was later adapted into a 2024 Disney+ original series, which Kang also scripted.

On March 31, 2012, Kang marked his tenth year as a webtoon artist by hosting a book concert, Kang Full, 10 Years of Romance Comics, at Art Center K in Seoul. The event was the first of its kind for a South Korean webtoon author and featured guest appearances by fellow cartoonists Yoon Tae-ho and Joo Ho-min. During the event, Kang reflected on his career trajectory from his debut with Everyday Matters to his more complex supernatural thrillers like Lighting Store.

In 2013, Kang serialized his eleventh webtoon, The Witch from October 18, 2013 to June 20, 2014. The series centers on a man’s efforts to support a woman who has become a social pariah after being blamed for a series of misfortunes surrounding her. Moving away from the supernatural elements of his previous "Universe" works, The Witch returned to the mystery-romance genre. It was later adapted into a 2025 television drama on Channel A.

=== 2015–present: Kang's action series: Moving, Bridge, and Hidden ===
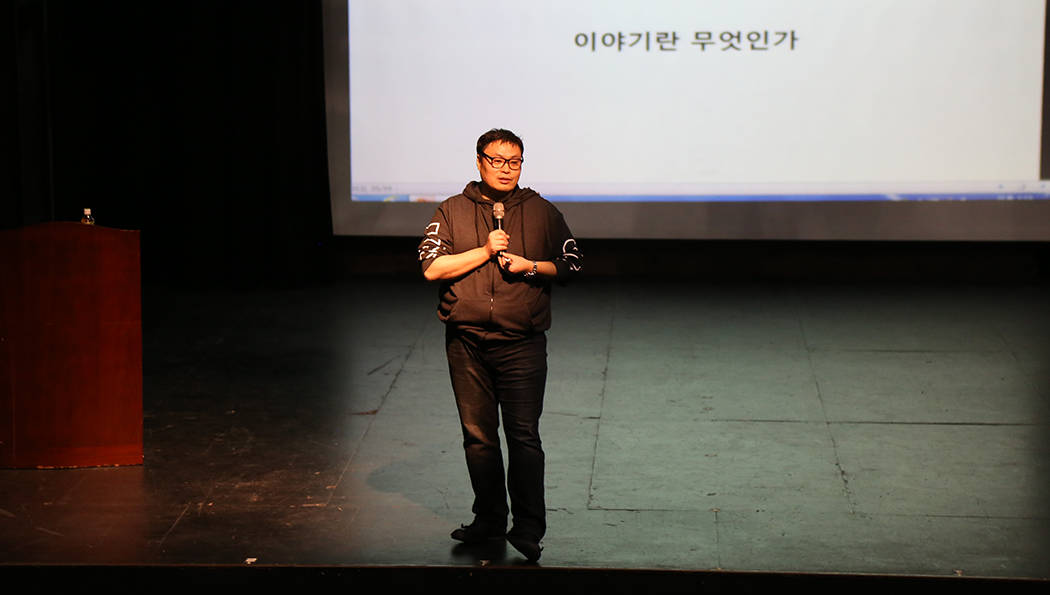
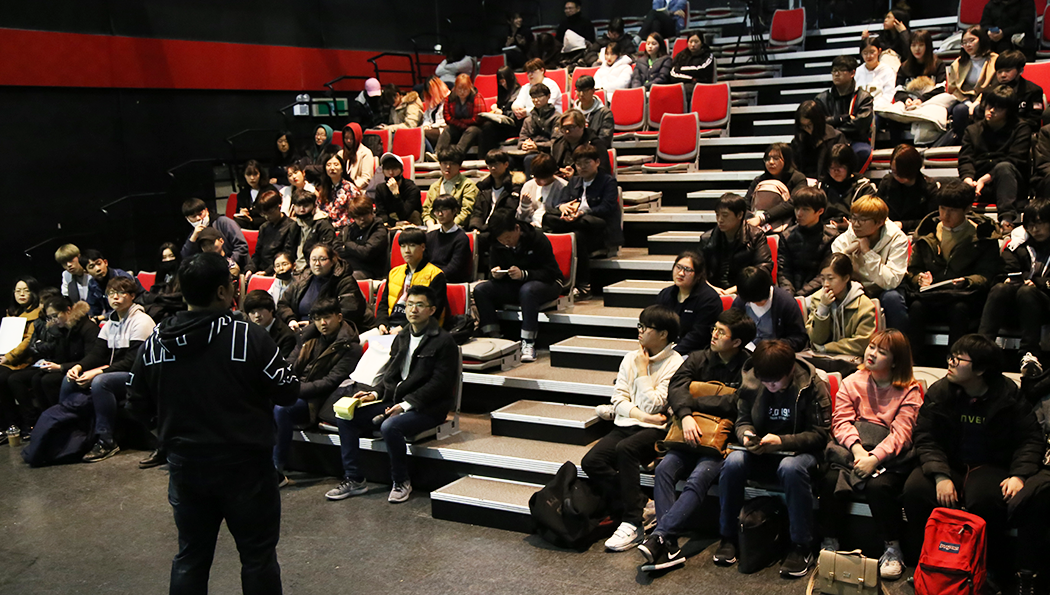
Kang Full did presentation in webtoon's course in 2018

In February 2015, Kang started serializing Moving. The narrative centers on a group of high school students possessing superhuman abilities and their parents, who work to protect their children while hiding their own pasts as former government black ops agents. Spanning 45 episodes until September 2015, it became his most extensive work. The series was later published as a five-volume set by Wisdom House on April 28, 2016.

In November 2015, Kang returned to his earlier format of film commentary with Kang Full's Jojo. Serialized weekly on NCSoft's "Space Conquest" blog, the strip featured reviews of new releases with a focus on character analysis. This project marked a return to the short-form, observational style of his debut work, Let's Have Fun with Movies, following several years of focusing on long-form narrative fiction.

In March 2017, Kang released Bridge, a sequel to Moving set in the "Kang Full Universe." The webtoon features the protagonists of Moving (Bong-seok, Hee-su, and Kang-hoon) alongside key characters from Timing, including Kim Young-tak and Kang Min-hyuk. By placing the physical superhuman abilities of the former alongside the temporal powers of the latter within the same universe, Bridge creates a cohesive continuity between Kang's supernatural-themed works.

In April 2017, Kang Full's webtoon adaptation Moving was announced as part of future drama line-up of newly established Studio and New, subsidiary of Next Entertainment World. In 2021, Moving was announced as a Disney+ original series, starring Ryu Seung-ryong, Han Hyo-joo, and Jo In-sung. This project, marked Kang's debut as a screenwriter. Directed by Park In-je, director of the film Ordinary People (2017) and Netflix series Kingdom Season 2.

Following the conclusion of Bridge, Kang announced plans for Hidden, the final installment in a planned trilogy of supernatural action webtoons. Although originally scheduled for serialization in 2019, the project was postponed as Kang shifted his focus to the live-action adaptation of Moving. During the development of the Moving television series (2023), Kang incorporated several narrative elements and characters originally intended for Hidden. This includes the antagonist Frank, a supernatural assassin, and the character Jeon Gye-do. As of 2024, the webtoon version of Hidden remains unreleased, though Kang has indicated that his work on the Disney+ series has allowed him to expand the "Kang Full Universe" beyond the constraints of the original webtoon format.

== Other work ==
=== Children picture books ===
In January 2013, Kang published his first children's picture book, Hi, Friend (안녕, 친구야). Written as a dedication to his daughter, the book reached the top 20 on national bestseller lists in its first month of release. Later, in December, Hi, Friend was adapted into a family musical. Produced through a collaboration between the performance production company NEO and the Hwaseong City Cultural Foundation, the musical was performed at the U&I Center Hwaseong Art Hall from December 19 to 31.

In the following year, Kang released a second picture book, Ice Ding!, which focuses on traditional Korean children's games. The book aims to familiarize children with traditional outdoor games and evoke nostalgia in adult readers.

In early 2016, Kang's illustrations were displayed in a collaborative exhibition with children's author Choi Sook-hee at the Incheon City Lifelong Learning Centre. The exhibition, titled Hi, My Friend! It's Okay, featured 15 original artworks from Kang's children's picture book Hi, Friend and delved into topics of social development and self-confidence in early childhood.

=== The Kang Full Cartoon Alley ===
In September 2013, the Gangdong District Office completed "The Kang Full Cartoon Alley" in Seongnae-dong as part of an urban regeneration initiative. Kang worked with the agency Pingpong Art and volunteer muralists to transform the residential neighborhood with murals based on his most popular works, including Pure Love Comics, Fool, and I Love You.

On February 8, 2017, the district expanded the project with the opening of "Seungryong's House," a community center named after the protagonist of Fool. Situated at the end of the cartoon street, the center includes a cafe, a public comic book library, and a subsidized workspace for emerging webtoon artists.

The project's positive impact on urban revitalization was acknowledged globally when it won the Landscape Award at the 2017 Asia Urban Landscape Awards, which was co-hosted by UN-Habitat. Building on this achievement, the district commissioned ten more murals in late 2017. These murals were created in collaboration with residents and artists from "Seungryong's House" to ensure that the new additions complemented the existing streetscape.

== Working style ==
=== Art Style/Technique and materials ===
Kang prefers to work from a plot rather than from a full script. Film adaptation.

=== Kang Full Universe ===
The "Kang Full Universe" is a shared continuity encompassing many of Kang's supernatural and action webtoons serialized on Daum. Established over more than a decade, the universe began with the horror-thriller Apartment (2004) and expanded through Timing (2005), Again (2009), Light Shop (2011), Moving (2015), and Bridge (2017). The series is characterized by the intersection of different supernatural "types." For example, the "time-sleepers" and precognitives from Timing reappear in the afterlife-focused Light Shop and the thriller Again. This culminated in the 2017 series Bridge, a major crossover event that united the physically superhuman characters of Moving with the temporal-manipulators of Timing to face a common antagonist. The continuity is noted for its "grounded" approach to superpowers, often focusing on how these abilities impact family life and Korean social issues.

Moving pop up Store.

== Personal life ==
Kang married in 2006 and has one daughter, Kang So-ri (nickname Eunchong) who was born on January 14, 2013. Kang's family share their home with two cats, Godori and Cheongwoon.

He is a prominent advocate for animal welfare, particularly the rescue and medical care of stray cats. In early 2013, during the development of the "Cartoon Alley" mural project, Kang proposed the establishment of public feeding stations for stray cats to Gangdong District Mayor Lee Hae-sik. The proposal was adopted, and in June 2013, Gangdong District became the first local government in South Korea to install official feline feeding stations at community centers and government offices. The initiative has since served as a model for similar urban animal welfare programs across the country.

== Works ==
=== Daily/weekly strips webtoons ===
Daily/weekly strips webtoon
Year	Title		Notes	Ref.
Year	English	Korean	Notes	Ref.
2002	Everyday Matters	일쌍다반사	Originally serialized on kangfull.com. Later, Serialized in Sports Today	
2002	The supernatural mystery phenomenon, X-Files	초자연적 미스터리 현상, 엑스파일	Serialized on kangfull.com	
2002	Let's Have Fun with Movies	영화야 놀자	Serialized on Daum Movie Section	
2002	Kang Full's Serendipity	강풀의 보나마나	Serialized on Internet newspaper Ddanzi Ilbo	
2015	Kangful's Jojo Season 1	강풀의 조조 시즌 1	Serialized on NCSoft's blog	
2018	Kangful's Jojo Season 2	강풀의 조조 시즌 2	Serialized on NCSoft's blog	

=== Serial webtoons ===
Serial webtoons
Year	Title		Publication Date	Notes	Ref.
Year	English	Korean	Publication Date	Notes	Ref.
2003	Pure Love Comic	순정만화	October 24, 2003 – April 7, 2004	Romance Series Season 1	
2004	Apartment	아파트	May 25, 2004 – January 15, 2008	Mystery Psychological Anecdote Season 1	
2004	Fool	바보	November 1, 2004 – April 11, 2005	Romance Series Season 2	
2005	Timing	타이밍	June 10, 2005 – November 7, 2005	Mystery Psychological Anecdote Season 2; 1st Kang Full's Superpower series	
2006	26 Years	26년	September 28, 2006 – April 10, 2006	Genre: Drama, Revenge	
2007	I Love You	그대를 사랑합니다	April 17, 2007 – September 6, 2005	Romance Series Season 3	
2008	Neighbor	이웃사람	June 9, 2008 – October 29, 2008	Mystery Psychological Anecdote Season 3	
2009	Again	어게인	July 6, 2009 – November 20, 2009	Mystery Psychological Anecdote Season 4	
2010	Every Moment of Your Life	당신의 모든 순간	September 6, 2010 – January 3, 2011	Romance Series Season 4	
2011	Lighting Store	조명가게	August 8, 2011 – December 6, 2011	Mystery Psychological Anecdote Season 5	
2013	Witch	마녀	October 18, 2013 – June 20, 2014	Romance Series Season 5	
2015	Moving	무빙	February 16, 2015 – September 15, 2015	Kang Full's Action Series Season 1; 2nd Kang Full's Superpower series	
2017	Bridge	브릿지	March 27, 2017 – January 1, 2018	Kang Full's Action Series Season 2; 3rd Kang Full's Superpower series	
TBA	Hidden	히든	—N/a	Kang Full's Action Series Season 3; 4th Kang Full's Superpower series	

=== Published manhwa ===
Published manhwa
Title		Publisher	Vol.	Ed.	Published Date	ISBN	Ref.
English	Korean	Publisher	Vol.	Ed.	Published Date	ISBN	Ref.
Question Mark that Won't Get Tired	지치지 않을 물음표	Summer Brush	—N/a	1	October 28, 2002	978-8-9952-6684-7	
Question Mark that Won't Get Tired	지치지 않을 물음표	Summer Brush	—N/a	2	October 10, 2009	978-8-9707-5479-6	
Pure Love Comic	순정만화	World History of Literature	1	1	February 10, 2004	978-8-9707-5300-3	
Pure Love Comic	순정만화	World History of Literature	2	1	May 10, 2004	978-8-9707-5306-5	
Everyday Matters	일쌍다반사	World History of Literature	—N/a	1	August 17, 2004	978-8-9707-5312-6	
Everyday Matters	일쌍다반사	Beware of fun	1	2	February 24, 2012	978-8-9011-4080-3	
Everyday Matters	일쌍다반사	Beware of fun	2	2	February 24, 2012	978-8-9011-4081-0	
Let's Have Fun with Movies	영화야 놀자	Woongjin of Fun	—N/a	1	March 12, 2007	978-8-9707-5379-9	
Let's Have Fun with Movies	영화야 놀자	Woongjin of Fun	—N/a	2	February 24, 2012	978-8-9011-4082-7	
Moving	무빙	World History of Literature	1	1	April 25, 2016	978-8-9608-6921-9	
Moving	무빙	World History of Literature	2	1	April 25, 2016	978-8-9608-6922-6	
Moving	무빙	World History of Literature	3	1	April 25, 2016	978-8-9608-6923-3	
Moving	무빙	World History of Literature	4	1	April 25, 2016	978-8-9608-6924-0	
Moving	무빙	World History of Literature	5	1	April 25, 2016	978-8-9608-6925-7	
Moving	무빙	World History of Literature	Set	1	April 25, 2016	978-8-9608-6926-4	

=== Children picture books ===
Children picture books
Year	Title		Publisher	Published Date	ISBN	Ref.
Year	English	Korean	Publisher	Published Date	ISBN	Ref.
2013	Hi, Friend	안녕 친구야	Woongjin Junior	January 14, 2013	978-8-9011-5372-8	
2014	Ice Ding!	얼음 땡!	Woongjin Junior	July 15, 2014	978-8-9011-6577-6	

== Screen and stage adaptations ==
=== Film ===
Film adaptations of Kang's works
Year	Title		Credited as		Note(s)	Ref.
Year	English	Korean	Creator	Scriptwriter	Note(s)	Ref.
2006	Apt.	아파트	Yes	No		
2008	BABO	바보	Yes	No		
2008	Hello, Schoolgirl	순정만화	Yes	No		
2010	Late Blossom	그대를 사랑합니다	Yes	No		
2011	Pained	통증	Yes	No	Adapted from webtoon draft that was never published before.	
2012	26 Years	26년	Yes	No		
2012	The Neighbor	이웃사람	Yes	No		
2014	Timing	타이밍	Yes	Yes	Animation	
TBA	The Host 2	괴물 2	—N/a	Yes	Discontinued	

International adaptations of Kang's works
Year	Country	Title		Credited as		Note(s)	Ref.
Year	Country	English	Native	Creator	Scriptwriter	Note(s)	Ref.
2022	China	I Love You	我要和你在一起	Yes	No	Adapted from the webtoon "The Witch" (마녀)	
2023	China	Love Life Light	照明商店	Yes	No	Adapted from the webtoon "Light Shop" (조명가게)	
2023	China Hong Kong	Love Never Ends	我爱你！	Yes	No	Adapted from the webtoon "I Love You" (그대를 사랑합니다)	

=== Television and web series ===
Television and web adaptations of Kang's works
Year	Title		Credited as		Note(s)	Ref.
Year	English	Korean	Creator	Scriptwriter	Note(s)	Ref.
2012	I Love You	그대를 사랑합니다	Yes	No	Originally planned as MBC Drama; Aired on cable TV SBS Plus in April 2012	
2023	Moving	무빙	Yes	Yes	Disney+ Original Series (20 Episodes)	
2024	Light Shop	조명가게	Yes	Yes	Disney+ Original Series (8 Episodes)	
2025	The Witch	마녀	Yes	No	Channel A drama (10 Episodes)	

=== Theater and musical ===
Theater and musical adaptations of Kang's works
Year	Title		Credited as		Notes	Ref.
Year	English	Korean	Creator	Scriptwriter	Notes	Ref.
2005	Kang Full's Pure Love Comic	순정만화	Yes	No	Open run theater	
2008	I Love You	그대를 사랑합니다	Yes	No	Theater	
2011	Kang Full's Pure Love Comic	순정만화	Yes	No	Autumn Entertainment	
2013	Hi, Friend	안녕 친구야	Yes	No	Children Musical	

== Accolades ==
In 2013, The Kang Full Cartoon Alley was established (named in his honour) in Gangdong District, Seoul.

=== Awards and nominations ===
Awards and nominations
Year	Award	Category	Nominated work	Result	Ref.
2004	Today's Our Comics Awards (Note: Today's Our Comics Awards is an award hosted by the Ministry of Culture, Sports and Tourism. Due to this unique characteristic, the award is highly regarded as an authoritative recognition that represents the current state of Korean comics.)	The Representatives of Korean Comics (1st Half)	Pure Love Comics	Top 3 (Note: Three awards were given to Kang Full, Choi Gyu-seok and Park So-hee)	
2004	Korea Cartoon Awards	Excellence Award	Pure Love Comics	Won	
2004	Korea Cartoon Awards	Popularity Award	Pure Love Comics	Nominated	
2004	Readers' Comics Awards	Grand Prize	Pure Love Comics	Won	
2005	Bucheon International Cartoon Festival	Grand Prize	Apartment	Won	
2006	Readers' Comics Awards	Grand Prize	26 Years	Won	
2010	11th Korea National Assembly Awards	Cartoon of the Year Award	I Love You (Late Blossom)	Won	
2015	Today's Our Comics Awards	The Representatives of Korean Comics	Moving	Top 5 (Note: Five awards were given to Kang Full (Moving), Hong Yeon-sik (Mr. Madang's Dining Table), Gold Kiwi Bird (I Don't Mind Dying), Lee Sang-gyu (Tiger's Brother), and Lee Soo (Ho!) as the representatives of 2015 Korean webtoons)	
2015	2nd SF Awards	Best SF comics	Moving	Nominated	
2023	Asia Contents Awards & Global OTT Awards	Best Creative	Moving	Won	
2023	Asia Contents Awards & Global OTT Awards	Best Writer	Moving	Won	
2023	23th Cartoon Day Awards (Note: Cartoon Day event was established by the Korea Cartoonists Association (Chairman Kim Soo-jeong) in 2001. The Cartoonists Association established November 3 as Comics Day, when a rally was held in Yeouido in 1996 to combat the 1993 movement to eradicate illegal Japanese comics.)	Achievement Award	Kang Full	Won	
2023	APAN Star Awards	Best Screenwriter	Moving	Nominated	
2023	Consumer Rights Day KCA Culture and Entertainment Awards	Best Screenplay	Moving	Won	
2024	CJENM Visionary Awards (Note: Visionary Awards, which started in 2020, selects and awards people who lead roles in the Korean entertainment industry. It highlights the meaning and achievements of a person whose chosen trend keywords penetrated the entertainment industry, including broadcasting, movies, music, and performances, and presents the next vision of the cultural sector with outstanding achievements and influence.)	2024 Visionary	Kang Full	Won	
2024	Baeksang Arts Awards	Best Screenplay – Television	Moving	Won	
2024	Seoul International Drama Awards	Best Screenplay	Moving	Nominated	
2025	Global OTT Awards	Best Writer	Light Shop	Nominated	

=== Listicles ===
Name of publisher, year listed, name of listicle, and placement
Publisher	Year	Listicle	Placement	Ref.
Gallup Korea	2024	South Korean Favorite Cartoonist	included	
Sisa Journal (Note: Sisa Journal Next Generation Leader-Society was founded by Sisa Journal in 2008.)	2008	The most influential next-generation leader selected by comics industry experts	1st	
Sisa Journal	2009	The most influential next-generation leader selected by comics industry experts	1st	
Sisa Journal	2010	The most influential next-generation leader selected by comics industry experts	2nd	
Sisa Journal	2011	The most influential next-generation leader selected by comics industry experts	1st	
Sisa Journal	2012	The most influential next-generation leader selected by comics industry experts	1st	
