= Love Story (manhwa) =

South Korean webtoon by Kang Full

순정만화 Sunjeong manhwa
- Genre: Romance
- Author: Kang Full

Love Story (Korean: 순정만화), also known as Crush On You, is a South Korean webtoon written and illustrated by Kang Full. The story surrounds a love triangle between a schoolgirl, one of her long-time friends, and her teacher.

It was adapted into the live-action film Hello, Schoolgirl in 2008.

== Characters ==
- Kim Yeon-woo (김연우)

A shy, 30-year-old civil servant who moves into an apartment next door to Soo-young. Yeon-woo lost his parents at a young age and was raised by his grandparents and other such relatives. He had been on a string of unsuccessful blind dates with various women when Soo-young accidentally throws garbage on him while she is on her way to school. Their relationship grows closer, but Yeon-woo struggles with his feelings for Soo-young. In the end, he and Soo-young both confess their love for each other.

- Han Soo-young (한수영)

An 18-year-old high school student named Soo-young lives with her doting mother. Soo-young's father left her and her mother when she was a young child, leading to her mother having to raise her alone. Despite the challenges she faces, Soo-young has a bright, fiery personality. When she and her best friend, Da-Jung, run into Yeon-woo on the train, she asks him to give her his tie, which cements their friendship. In college, she almost dates Kang Sook, but she can not get over her previous feelings for Yeon-woo.

- Kang Sook (강숙)

Kang Sook is a 22-year-old high school graduate. He is Yeon-woo's colleague, though he soon falls for Ha-Kyung after they meet at a park. After a while they begin dating, though Ha-kyung is shocked when Sook kisses her. This is because he at the time, did not know about Ha-kyung's struggle with her feelings about her boyfriend's death. Kang Sook goes off to fulfil his mandatory military service, and returns a changed man.

- Kwon Ha-kyung (권하경)

A 29-year-old melancholic photographer. She is still in mourning over her boyfriend's death. And at first, she does not return Kang Sook's feelings for her, but she soon starts to date him, though is shocked when he kisses her, as she is still struggling with her boyfriend's death.

- Jeong Da-jung (정다정)

Soo-young's best friend who thinks Kang Sook is Soo-young's boyfriend.

- Kyu-chul (규철)

Ha-kyung's boyfriend who is a photographer, and who died serving as a soldier.

- Mrs. Han

Soo-young's mother, an eccentric woman who raised her daughter singlehandedly after her husband left them some years ago. She is shocked when she sees Soo-young and Yeon-woo holding hands.

- Kyu-Chul's parents

An elderly couple who works at a laundromat. They lost their only son two years ago, and his girlfriend Ha-kyung visits them as they were close. Yeon-woo is a frequent customer, and Kyu-chul's mother gives him Kyu-chul's clothes, but her husband resents this decision, as he views it as Yeon-woo trying to replace his son.

== Film adaptation ==
In November 2008, Love Story was adapted into a feature-length film, titled Hello, Schoolgirl. Directed by Ryu Jang-ha, the film deviates a lot from its source material but keeps the webtoon's primary themes intact. The film was a financial success on release, topping the box office on its first weekend.
