= Springtime (2004 film) =

- Theatrical release poster
- Hangul: 꽃피는 봄이 오면
- RR: Kkotpineun bomi omyeon
- MR: Kkotp'inŭn pomi omyŏn
- Directed by: Ryu Jang-ha
- Written by: Ryu Jang-ha
- Produced by: Choi Eun-hwa
- Starring: Choi Min-sik; Jang Shin-young; Kim Ho-jung; Youn Yuh-jung; Jang Hyun-sung; Kim Kang-woo
- Cinematography: Lee Mo-gae
- Edited by: Kim Hyun
- Music by: Jo Seong-woo
- Distributed by: Big Blue Film
- Release date: September 17, 2004
- Running time: 128 minutes
- Country: South Korea
- Language: Korean

Springtime (Korean: 꽃피는 봄이 오면; RR: Kkotpineun bomi omyeon; lit. 'When Spring Comes') is a 2004 South Korean musical drama film written and directed by Ryu Jang-ha in his feature directional debut. It stars Choi Min-sik as a struggling musician who takes a job as a music teacher in a rural mining town outside of Seoul. The film was released in South Korea on September 17, 2004.

== Plot ==
Hyun-woo, a trumpet player who once dreamed of performing in a symphony orchestra, struggles after abandoning his aspirations and parting ways with his former lover, Yeon-hee. Feeling that his life has reached a dead end, he accepts a temporary position as the instructor of the school concert band at Dogye Middle School in Gangwon Province.

Hyun-woo discovers that the school's band is in poor condition, with worn-out instruments, damaged sheet music, and only faded reminders of its former achievements. The band faces dissolution unless it wins the upcoming national competition, leaving Hyun-woo and his students to prepare for what appears to be an unlikely victory. Despite the odds, he becomes inspired by the students' growing enthusiasm for music and commits himself to helping them succeed.

While working with the band, Hyun-woo continues to struggle with memories of Yeon-hee. At the same time, he gradually forms a bond with Su-yeon, the village pharmacist, whose kindness helps him recover from his emotional wounds. Through the support of his students and the people around him, Hyun-woo regains hope and realizes that he is capable of loving again. As the band works toward the national competition, the arrival of spring symbolizes both the students' growth and Hyun-woo's emotional renewal.

== Cast ==
- Choi Min-sik as Hyun-woo
- Jang Shin-young as Su-yeon
- Kim Ho-jung as Yeon-hee
- Youn Yuh-jung as Hyun-woo's mother
- Jang Hyun-sung as Kyung-soo
- Kim Kang-woo as Ju-ho
- Choi Il-hwa as Yong Seok's father
- Kim Dong-young as Yong Seok
- Lee Jae-eung as Jae-il
- Um Hyo-sup as On-duty teacher
- Lee Min-ah as the woman in front

== Production ==
Among the students portraying members of the school band, all except Jae-il (Lee Jae-eung) and Yong Seok (Kim Dong-young) were actual members of Dogye Middle School's concert band.

== Reception ==
The film attracted approximately 490,000 admissions during its theatrical run in South Korea.

== Accolades ==
| Award | Year | Category | Recipient(s) | Result | Ref. |
|---|---|---|---|---|---|
| Blue Dragon Film Awards | 2004 | Best Actor | Choi Min-sik | Nominated | |
| Blue Dragon Film Awards | 2004 | Best New Actress | Jang Shin-young | Nominated | |
| Blue Dragon Film Awards | 2004 | Best Music | Jo Seong-woo | Won | |
| Korean Film Awards | 2004 | Best Actor | Choi Min-sik | Nominated | |
| Korean Film Awards | 2004 | Best Supporting Actress | Youn Yuh-jung | Nominated | |
| Korean Film Awards | 2004 | Best Music | Jo Seong-woo | Nominated | |
| Korean Film Awards | 2004 | Best New Director | Ryu Jang-ha | Nominated | |
| Korean Film Awards | 2004 | Best New Actor | Kim Kang-woo | Nominated | |
