= Pained =

Pain
- Theatrical release poster
- Hangul: 통증
- Hanja: 痛症
- RR: Tongjeung
- MR: T'ongchŭng
- Directed by: Kwak Kyung-taek
- Screenplay by: Han Soo-ryun
- Story by: Kang Full
- Produced by: Lee Ji-seung
- Starring: Kwon Sang-woo; Jung Ryeo-won
- Cinematography: Hwang Ki-seok
- Edited by: Kim Sang-bum; Kim Jae-bum
- Music by: Kim Jun-seong
- Distributed by: Lotte Entertainment
- Release date: September 7, 2011
- Running time: 104 minutes
- Country: South Korea
- Language: Korean
- Box office: US$4.4 million

Pained (Korean: 통증; lit. 'Pain') is a 2011 South Korean romantic drama film directed by Kwak Kyung-taek. Kwak's first feature in three years, it is a romantic melodrama set in Seoul, which is a departure from the director's previous Busan-based masculine thrillers and gangster movies. It is adapted from an original story by webtoon artist Kang Full.

== Plot ==
Debt collector Nam-soon (Kwon Sang-woo) lost his sense of pain after a traumatic accident during his youth, and now regularly takes beatings for his job. Street vendor Dong-hyun (Jung Ryeo-won) suffers from severe hemophilia, a disorder that impedes the body's ability to stop bleeding. For Dong-hyun, even the most minor of injuries could be deadly. She's left homeless after Nam-soon collects the last of her money, so he decides to take her in. As the two grow closer, Nam-soon suddenly begins to lose his lifelong insensitivity to pain and the hurt of a lifetime washes over him. Together, these two lonely souls learn to hurt and hope again...

== Cast ==
- Kwon Sang-woo – Nam-soon
- Jung Ryeo-won – Dong-hyun
- Ma Dong-seok – Bum-no
- Jang Young-nam – Kye-jung
- Kim Hyeong-jong – jobless guy
- Keum Dong-hyun – Young-bae
- Lee Mi-do – street vendor
- Mahbub Alam – street vendor
- Song Bong-geun – bucktooth
- Oh Joo-hee – Nam-soon's aunt
- Kang Min-ah – Nam-soon's older sister
- Kwak Min-seok – newlywed husband
- Kim Yeon-ah – newlywed wife
- Kim Jin-goo – grandmother owner
- Sa-hee – actress
- Kwon Oh-jin – trader representative
- Kim Min-jun – male actor (cameo)
