= Ryu Jang-ha =

South Korean filmmaker (born 1966)

- Born: 1966 (age 59–60); Seoul, South Korea
- Education: Chung-Ang University, Korean Academy of Film Arts
- Occupations: Film director, screenwriter

Korean name
- Hangul: 류장하
- RR: Ryu Jangha
- MR: Ryu Changha

Ryu Jang-ha (Korean: 류장하; born 1966) is a South Korean film director and screenwriter.

== Career ==
Born in 1966 in Seoul, South Korea, Ryu graduated from Chung-Ang University. He also graduated as the best student from the 12th Korean Academy of Film Arts. In 1998, he worked as assistant to director Hur Jin-ho's debut feature film Christmas in August. He reunited with Hur for his 2001 film One Fine Spring Day, writing the script as well as an assistant director.

== Filmography ==
=== As director ===
- Springtime (2004)
- Hello, Schoolgirl (2008)
- Pension: Dangerous Encounter (2018)

=== As assistant director ===
- Christmas in August (1998)
- One Fine Spring Day (2001)

=== As screenwriter ===
- One Fine Spring Day (2001)
- Springtime (2004)
- Hello, Schoolgirl (2008)

== Awards ==
- 2004 Tokyo International Film Festival: Asian Film Award - Special Mention (Springtime)
