= 26 Years =

2012 South Korean film directed by Cho Geun-hyeon

- Promotional poster for 26 Years
- Hangul: 26년
- Hanja: 26年
- RR: 26nyeon
- MR: 26nyŏn
- Directed by: Cho Geun-hyun
- Written by: Lee Hae-young
- Based on: 26 Years by Kang Full
- Produced by: Choi Yong-bae
- Starring: Jin Goo; Han Hye-jin; Bae Soo-bin; Im Seulong
- Cinematography: Kim Tae-kyung
- Edited by: Hahm Sung-won; Son Yeon-ji
- Music by: Lee Jin-hee; Kim Hong-jib
- Distributed by: Invent Stone Corp. Chungeorahm Film
- Release date: November 29, 2012
- Running time: 135 minutes
- Country: South Korea
- Language: Korean
- Budget: ₩6.6 billion
- Box office: US$19.5 million

26 Years (Korean: 26년; RR: 26 nyeon) is a 2012 South Korean film based on the popular 2006 manhwa serialized online by manhwaga Kang Full. It is the fictional story of five ordinary people (a sports shooter, a gangster, a policeman, a businessman, and head of a private security firm) who band together in order to assassinate the man responsible for the massacre of innocent civilians in Gwangju in May 1980.

== Plot ==
The story deals with one of the most tragic and critical events in South Korean history. On May 18, 1980, in the city of Gwangju, state troops were ordered to open fire on civilians, killing and wounding thousands. Former president Chun Doo-hwan is believed to have given the order, and although he is not named explicitly in the film, the target of the assassination attempt is clearly meant to represent Chun, who was convicted in 1996 of crimes related to the Gwangju Massacre, but later pardoned by President Kim Dae-jung.

26 years later in 2006, five people who consider themselves as some of the biggest victims of the massacre, plot a top-secret project to exact revenge by assassinating the man responsible. Kwon Jung-hyuk is a newly recruited policeman who lost his family in the massacre; he is now responsible for the cars that have access to the target's house. Kwak Jin-bae is a young gangster from an organized crime group whose father was also killed. Olympic sharpshooter Shim Mi-jin, a CEO from a large company and the director of a private security firm are also involved. As a former president, "that man" lives under police protection in an affluent district of Seoul, but through a combination of ingenuity, skill, and well-placed money they are able to draw within shooting distance of their target.

== Cast ==
- Jin Goo - Kwak Jin-bae (gangster)
- Han Hye-jin - Shim Mi-jin (shooter of national team)
- Lim Seul-ong - Kwon Jung-hyuk (policeman)
- Bae Soo-bin - Kim Joo-ahn (lobbyist)
- Lee Geung-young - Kim Gap-se (chairman of a company)
- Jang Gwang - "that man" (ex-president)
- Jo Deok-jae - Ma Sang-ryul
- Kim Eui-sung - Chief Choi
- Ahn Suk-hwan - Ahn Soo-ho
- Lee Mi-do - Kwak Jin-bae's mother
- Kim Min-jae
- Jung Hee-tae as Teo Mi-neol

== Production ==
Kang Full's webtoon illustrated the brutal suppression by the dictatorial administration of the time, putting emphasis on the overcoming of interpersonal and societal barriers.

In 2008, the film was originally set to be directed by Lee Hae-young based on his own adapted screenplay titled 29 Years, with Ryoo Seung-bum, Kim Ah-joong, Jin Goo, Chun Ho-jin, and Byun Hee-bong cast in the lead roles. But the production came to a halt once investors pulled out from funding the film ten days before filming began because of its controversial politically sensitive content, and rumors were rife that the pressure had originated from the conservative government.

After nearly four years of languishing in pre-production limbo due to financial difficulties, online donations poured in from 15,000 individuals amounting to ₩700 million (US$646,000), with singer Lee Seung-hwan contributing another ₩1 billion won (US$923,000), toward the film's ₩4.6 billion (US$4,246,000) production cost. Another investor was television personality Kim Je-dong. The crowdfunding enabled the production to finally begin filming Lee's script with a new cast and director on July 19, 2012. Filming wrapped on October 10, 2012. The film's ending credits roll for more than 10 minutes, as they include all 15,000 donors' names. Director Cho Geun-hyun said at the movie's press conference, "When one does something terribly wrong and hurts others, they should at least apologize. And even if he or she chooses not to, they should be punished for what they've done. This is common sense, not some political idea."

== Box office ==
The film debuted at the top of the box office, selling 1,108,714 tickets in only a single week on release. It reached 2.5 million admissions in mid-December 2012, resulting in a total of nearly 3 million in January 2013.

== Awards and nominations ==
2013 Baeksang Arts Awards

- Nomination - Best New Actor - Im Seulong
- Nomination - Best New Director - Cho Geun-hyun

2013 Buil Film Awards

- Nomination - Best Actor - Jin Goo
- Nomination - Best Supporting Actor - Jang Gwang
- Nomination - Best New Director - Cho Geun-hyun

2013 Blue Dragon Film Awards

- Nomination - Best New Actor - Im Seulong

2014 Golden Cinema Festival

- Special Jury Prize - Jin Goo
