= List of 2008 box office number-one films in South Korea =

This is a list of films which have been placed number-one at the South Korean box office during 2008, based on admissions.

== Number-one films ==
†	This implies the highest-grossing movie of the year.

Weekend End Date	Film title	Weekend Admissions	Ref.
6 January	Bee Movie	311,435	
13 January	Forever the Moment	609,626	
20 January	Forever the Moment	457,074	
27 January	Forever the Moment	537,146	
3 February	The Devil's Game	361,650	
10 February	Once Upon a Time	478,543	
17 February	Jumper	560,359	
24 February	The Chaser	684,499	
2 March	The Chaser	627,749	
9 March	The Chaser	452,029	
16 March	10,000 BC	468,965	
23 March	Fate	356,776	
30 March	Awake	211,968	
6 April	The Guard Post	329,037	
13 April	Taken	291,771	
20 April	Taken	302,866	
27 April	The Forbidden Kingdom	475,082	
4 May	Iron Man	923,051	
11 May	Iron Man	753,154	
18 May	The Chronicles of Narnia: Prince Caspian	558,497	
25 May	Indiana Jones and the Kingdom of the Crystal Skull	1,396,175	
1 June	Indiana Jones and the Kingdom of the Crystal Skull	848,730	
8 June	Kung Fu Panda	1,148,609	
15 June	Kung Fu Panda	908,368	
22 June	Public Enemy Returns	1,057,829	
29 June	Wanted	824,925	
6 July	Hancock	1,001,557	
13 July	Red Cliff	657,297	
20 July	The Good, the Bad, the Weird †	1,673,970	
27 July	The Good, the Bad, the Weird †	849,980	
3 August	The Mummy: Tomb of the Dragon Emperor	1,467,878	
10 August	The Dark Knight	790,587	
17 August	The Dark Knight	762,351	
24 August	The Dark Knight	426,775	
31 August	The Dark Knight	304,224	
7 September	The Divine Weapon	630,257	
14 September	The Divine Weapon	646,920	
21 September	The Divine Weapon	425,298	
28 September	Mamma Mia! The Movie	278,125	
5 October	Modern Boy	329,956	
12 October	Eagle Eye	560,679	
19 October	Eagle Eye	437,935	
26 October	My Wife Got Married	416,914	
2 November	My Wife Got Married	329,591	
9 November	Quantum of Solace	667,761	
16 November	Portrait of a Beauty	487,326	
23 November	Portrait of a Beauty	406,395	
30 November	Hello, Schoolgirl	309,065	
7 December	Scandal Makers	473,725	
14 December	Scandal Makers	622,433	
21 December	Scandal Makers	597,611	
28 December	Scandal Makers	635,170	

== Highest-grossing films ==
Highest-grossing films of 2008 (by admissions)
Rank	Title	Country	Admissions	Domestic gross
1.	The Good, the Bad, the Weird	South Korea	6,684,933	US$38.6 million
2.	The Chaser	South Korea	5,046,096	US$30 million
3.	Kung Fu Panda	United States	4,653,929	US$26.4 million
4.	Mamma Mia!	United States	4,552,475	US$26.1 million
5.	Scandal Makers	South Korea	4,361,509	US$25.1 million
6.	Public Enemy Returns	South Korea	4,313,101	US$25.2 million
7.	Iron Man	United States	4,290,816	US$24.5 million
8.	Indiana Jones and the Kingdom of the Crystal Skull	United States	4,111,753	US$23.5 million
9.	The Mummy: Tomb of the Dragon Emperor	United States	4,090,885	US$23.1 million
10.	The Dark Knight	United States	4,060,490	US$23.7 million

Highest-grossing domestic films of 2008 (by admissions)
Rank	Title	Admissions	Domestic gross
1.	The Good, the Bad, the Weird	6,684,933	US$38.6 million
2.	The Chaser	5,046,096	US$30 million
3.	Scandal Makers	4,361,509	US$25.1 million
4.	Public Enemy Returns	4,313,101	US$25.2 million
5.	Forever the Moment	4,018,059	US$23 million
6.	The Divine Weapon	3,728,430	US$21.4 million
7.	Portrait of a Beauty	2,341,521	US$13.8 million
8.	Eye for an Eye	2,058,616	US$11.8 million
9.	My Wife Got Married	1,799,447	US$10.6 million
10.	Sunny	1,706,037	US$9.9 million

== See also ==
- List of South Korean films of 2008
