= The Hidden Face (film) =

2011 film

- United States theatrical release poster
- Spanish: La cara oculta
- Directed by: Andrés Baiz
- Written by: Andrés Baiz; Arturo Infante; Hatem Khraiche
- Produced by: Andrés Calderón; Cristian Conti
- Starring: Quim Gutiérrez; Clara Lago; Martina García
- Cinematography: Josep Civit
- Edited by: Roberto Otero
- Music by: Federico Jusid
- Production companies: Avalon; Cactus Flower; Dynamo; Fox International Productions
- Distributed by: 20th Century Fox (Spain); Buena Vista International (Colombia; through Cinecolor Films)
- Release dates: 16 September 2011 (Spain); 20 January 2012 (Colombia)
- Running time: 97 minutes
- Countries: Spain; Colombia
- Language: Spanish
- Budget: $2.6 million
- Box office: $6.3 million

The Hidden Face (Spanish: La cara oculta) is a 2011 thriller film directed by Andrés Baiz, who also co-wrote the screenplay. The film is a Spanish-Colombian co-production. It stars Quim Gutiérrez, Clara Lago and Martina García.

== Plot ==
Adrián, a young orchestra conductor is viewing a recorded video of his girlfriend Belén informing him of leaving him. Adrián becomes distraught. While drinking away his sorrows at a bar, he meets Fabiana (Martina Garcia) and they develop a relationship. Fabiana moves into the house that Adrián was sharing with Belén. Strange things begin to occur in the bathroom, with Fabiana observing strange noises coming from the sink and bathtub, and being scalded by an abruptly hot shower.

Adrián becomes a suspect in the disappearance of Belén; however, the investigators can find no evidence of Adrián's involvement in Belén's disappearance. One of the police investigators, apparently a former boyfriend of Fabiana, warns Adrián that if anything happens to Fabiana he will kill Adrián.

The house belongs to Emma, a German woman, who reveals a soundproof secret room intended for her former Nazi officer husband. Belén, driven by jealousy over Adrián's connection with violinist Verónica, follows Emma's suggestion to pretend she's leaving him. She records a breakup video and hides in the secret room, equipped with two-way mirrors to spy on Adrián's reaction. Belén plans to end the ruse, but loses the key, trapping herself without a way to contact Adrián.

Fabiana finds the key to the secret room, but she does not know what it is used for. Fabiana eventually figures out that Belén is trapped in the house because Belén is able to communicate through tapping on the pipes in the secret room, creating ripples in the full bathroom sink. As Fabiana is ready to open the door, she pauses and decides not to rescue Belén because she might lose Adrián.

Despite her inner turmoil, Fabiana opens the secret room's door to check on the unresponsive Belén. Jealousy stoked by an investigator's pictures of Adrián and Verónica influences Fabiana's decision. Inside the room, she finds Belén lying on a bed. Unexpectedly, Belén knocks Fabiana out, rendering her unconscious, and locks her in. Belén leaves the house, placing the secret room's key on a bed for Adrián and attaching a photo of them to the mirrored door. The film ends with Belén alone on the beach, and Fabiana trapped, awaiting rescue.

== Cast ==
- Quim Gutierrez as Adrián Salamanca
- Clara Lago as Belén Echeverria
- Martina García as Fabiana Caicedo
- Marcela Mar as Verónica
- Humberto Dorado as Roberto Peña (Tito)
- Julio Pachón as Francisco José Buitrago
- Juan Alfonso Baptista as Bernardo Ramírez
- Alexandra Stewart as Emma Engel

== Release ==
=== Theatrical Audience ===
20th Century Fox released The Hidden Face in 278 Spanish theaters on September 16, 2011. In its opening weekend, it reached third place at the box office, grossing €678,150.00 with 103,165 admissions, and ultimately finished with a total gross of €2,349,565.18 and 399,646 admissions.

It premiered in Colombia on January 20, 2012, distributed by Buena Vista International via Cinecolor Films in 93 theaters. After spending three weekends in second place, it reached the top spot in its fourth weekend, ultimately grossing a total of US$2,436,837.

=== Television Audience ===
The Hidden Face premiered on Spanish television on the Telecinco channel on October 31, 2015, at 11:35 PM, drawing an audience of 1,212,000 viewers and an 11.5% audience share.

== Reception ==
On the review aggregator website Rotten Tomatoes, the film holds an approval rating of 80% based on 5 reviews. Jonathan Holland from Variety wrote: "Andi Baiz's ambitious follow-up to the well-received Satanás does decent crowd-pleasing work, supplying the requisite jolts and nervous giggles en route to a payoff that's much stronger than its wobbly setup. But the pic ultimately fails to marshal its effects into anything more than throwaway entertainment." Chris Hewitt from St. Paul Pioneer Press gave a positive review, he wrote: "I'm not sure La Cara Oculta can stand up to much scrutiny — there's at least one gaping plot hole — but it's plenty of fun while its 93 minutes are zipping by." Jordi Batlle Caminal from Spanish newspaper La Vanguardia described the film as "(according to its own director) a tribute to Hitchcock's Rebecca, Suspicion and Notorious... The Hidden Face reveals itself as a suspense film well filmed and effective, willing to style and smoothly: tension is uniform and never decays."

=== Awards ===
Award	Category	Recipient	Result
Macondo Awards	Best Film		Nominated
Macondo Awards	Best Director	Andrés Baiz	Nominated
Macondo Awards	Best Actress	Martina García	Nominated
Macondo Awards	Best Supporting Actress	Clara Lago	Won
Macondo Awards	Best Screenplay	Andrés Baiz Hatem Khraiche Ruiz-Zorrilla	Nominated
Macondo Awards	Best Editing	Roberto Otero	Nominated
Macondo Awards	Best Original Music	Federico Jusid	Nominated
Macondo Awards	Best Sound Design	Eduardo G. Castro César Salazar	Won
Macondo Awards	Best Makeup	Olga Turrini	Nominated
TVyNovelas Awards Colombia	Best Colombian Film		Won

== Remakes ==
The film was remade in India (Murder 3) in 2013, in Uzbekistan (Rashk) in 2014, in Turkey (The Other Side) in 2017, in Mexico (Perdida) in 2019, and in South Korea (Hidden Face) in 2024.

== See also ==
- List of Spanish films of 2011
