= Hello, Schoolgirl =

- Theatrical poster
- Hangul: 순정만화
- Hanja: 純情漫畵
- RR: Sunjeongmanhwa
- MR: Sunjŏngmanhwa
- Directed by: Ryu Jang-ha
- Screenplay by: Ryu Jang-ha; Lee Taek-kyeong; Kang Kyoo-heon; Yoon Taek-Geun; Jeon Hyun-hee
- Based on: Sunjeong Manhwa by Kang Full
- Produced by: Kim Soon-ho; Jo Seong-woo; Choi Yong-bae
- Starring: Yoo Ji-tae; Lee Yeon-hee; Chae Jung-an; Kang-in
- Cinematography: Jo Sang-yoon
- Edited by: Moon In-dae
- Music by: Choi Yong-rak
- Production companies: Lets Films; MNFC; Cheong-a-ram
- Distributed by: CJ Entertainment
- Release date: November 27, 2008
- Running time: 113 minutes
- Country: South Korea
- Language: Korean
- Box office: US$3,550,487

Hello, Schoolgirl (Korean: 순정만화; RR: sunjeongmanhwa; lit. 'Sunjeong manhwa') is a 2008 South Korean film. Adapted from Love Story, a webtoon by Kang Full, it is the second film directed by Ryu Jang-ha. It stars Yoo Ji-tae, Lee Yeon-hee, Chae Jung-an, and Kang-in.

== Plot ==
Kwon Yeon-woo is a somewhat naive 30-year-old low-level civil servant who works in a city hall branch office. After moving into a new apartment, he encounters a high school girl, Soo-young, and sees her on his way to work every morning. She is a cheerful and eccentric 18-year-old who lives with her mother downstairs from him. Over time, the two begin to develop feelings for one another.

Meanwhile, 22-year-old Kang Sook, has just started working at the branch office. He falls head over heels for 29-year-old Kwon Ha-kyeong, a melancholy woman who wanders around taking pictures. She is still holding onto an old flame, and keeps looking for traces of that lost love every day. Kang Sook continues to woo her, regardless of her living in the past.

Can these two relationships ever lead to a happy ending?

== Cast ==
- Lee Yeon-hee as Han Soo-young, the schoolgirl
- Yoo Ji-tae as Kim Yeon-woo, the older man
- Kangin as Kang Sook, the new hire
- Chae Jung-an as Kwon Ha-kyeong, the older woman
- Choi Soo-young as Jeong Da-jeong, Soo-young's friend
- Na Young-hee as Soo-young's mother
- Park Bo-kyung as Newlywed woman
- Shin Choon-sik as the dry cleaner father
- Lee Joo-sil as the dry cleaner mother
- Kang Full (author of the webtoon) as the umbrella shop man (cameo)

== Production ==
Hello Schoolgirl is the second feature film directed by Ryu Jang-ha, following his 2004 debut Springtime. The film is adapted from the first webtoon by Kang Full, which was serialized on Daum and attracted a record-breaking 60 million page views and 500,000 visitor comments. As with the webtoon, the story of the film revolves around two unconventional romances with a noticeable age disparity, though other details of the original serial were changed, such as setting the story in the summer as opposed to winter. The script took two years to complete, and filming commenced on April 1, 2008.

== Release ==
Hello, Schoolgirl was released in South Korea on November 27, 2008, and topped the box office on its opening weekend with 309,065 admissions. As of December 21, the film had received a total of 740,379 admissions.

== Critical reception ==
Joon Soh of The Korea Times praised the film for retaining the essence of the webtoon despite deviations from the original story, saying, "Ryoo succeeds in capturing the tenderness of the online comic, which slowly comes to the surface as the relationships unfold. There is a rich, layered quality to the film, where each little decision or gesture leads to further meanings and possibilities"; however, he also noted that "there are times when the movie aims too much for the conventionally beautiful, sacrificing the awkward, self-deprecating humor that drives much of Kang Full's works."
