= Timing (film) =

2015 South Korean animated film

- Directed by: Min Kyung-jo
- Written by: Kang Full
- Based on: Timing by Kang Full
- Starring: Park Ji-yoon; Sung Hoon; Ryu Seung-gon; Yeo Min-jeong; Sim Gyu-hyuk; Sung Wan-kyung.
- Production company: Hyoin Entertainment
- Distributed by: Storm Pictures Korea
- Release dates: October 3, 2014 (Busan); May 24, 2015 (Seoul); December 10, 2015 (South Korea)
- Running time: 100 minutes
- Country: South Korea
- Language: Korean

Timing (Korean: 타이밍; RR: Taiming) is a 2015 South Korean animated film based on the webtoon of the same name by cartoonist Kang Full. The film was directed by Min Kyung-jo, and features the voices of Park Ji-yoon, Yoon Sang-hyun, Ryu Seung-gon, Yeo Min-jeong, Sim Gyu-hyuk and Sung Wan-kyung.

== Plot ==
Four people who have supernatural time controlling powers come to a school in order to prevent an imminent disaster. PARK Ja-gi is a high school teacher and the daughter of a shaman. She sees the upcoming disasters in her dreams beforehand but is not able to ascertain the causes and the process. Jang Se-yoon, female, mid 20's, sees the upcoming future ten minutes before it happens in her dream but does not know the context of the whole situation. KIM Young-tak is a high school student with the ability to stop time. KANG Min-hyuk, male, mid 30's, is able to rewind time by 10 seconds. They struggle to stop the impending tragedy.

== Cast ==
- Park Ji-yoon as Park Ja-gi
- Ahn Jae-hyun as Kim Young-tak
- Ryu Seung-gon as Kang Min-hyuk
- Yeo Min-jeong as Jang Se-yoon
- Sim Gyu-hyuk as Baek Ki-hyung
- Sung Wan-kyung as Yang Sung-sik

== Production ==
Production began in 2010.

== Release ==
Originally scheduled to be released on 2012, the film was shelved for sponsorship reasons. It premiered at the 2014 Busan International Film Festival.

== Awards and nominations ==
Year	Award	Category	Recipient	Result
2015	17th Seoul International Cartoon and Animation Festival	Grand prize	Timing	Won
