= Park In-je =

South Korean film director and screenwriter

- 박인제
- Born: May 21, 1973 (age 53); South Korea
- Education: Korea National University of Arts (Bachelor's degree in Film)
- Occupations: Film director,screenwriter}
- Years active: 2001–present

Korean name
- Hangul: 박인제
- RR: Bak Inje
- MR: Pak Inje

Park In-je (Korean: 박인제; born May 21, 1973) is a South Korean film director, television director and screenwriter. He directed the Netflix original series Kingdom Season 2 (2020) and the Disney+ original Moving (2023).

== Education ==
Park is a graduate from the Korea National University of Arts.

== Career ==
In 2001, Park made his debut as a director and screenwriter with the short film Happy Death. Two years later, in 2003, he directed and wrote the screenplay for another short film titled The End of the Road which later won the grand prize at the fourth Mise-en-scène Short Film Festival.

While working on a story about a journalist, Park discovered the true story about a soldier named Yun Seok-yang, an army soldier serving in the Defense Security Command of Korea's Armed Forces. In 1990, Yun left his military base and took a floppy disk with a secret list of important people which included the names of former presidents and religious leaders; previously it had been subject to investigations by the Defense Security Command. Yun decided to reveal the contents of the disk at a press conference, believing it was the right thing to do. This story inspired Park to make a movie, called Moby Dick, about a journalist trying to uncover a secret organization that controls the government.

Park co-directed the second season of Kim Eun-hee's show Kingdom with Kim Seong-hun; it aired in 2020. In February 2021, it was reported that the agreement between the co-producers JTBC and Next Entertainment World had been canceled. As a result, Park In-je replaced Director Mo Wan-il as the director of the Disney+ Original Moving.

== Filmography ==
=== Short film ===
Year	Title		Role			Ref.
Year	English	Korean	Director	Writer	Other	Ref.
2000	Enjoy Your Summer	엔조이 유어 썸머	No	No	Cinematography	
2001	Happy Death	행복한 죽음	Yes	Yes	Music, sound mixing	
2002	A Blossom on Tea	하교길	No	No	Lighting	
2002	Dancing Cop Twist Kim	수사반장 트위스트 김	No	No	Cinematography	
2002	Lesson	레슨	No	No	Lighting	
2003	The End of the Road	여기가 끝이다	Yes	Yes	Sound mixing	
2009	Short! Short! Short! 2009: Show Me The Money — Price of Ciggarettes	황금시대 — 담뱃값	No	No	Music	

=== Feature film ===
Year	Title		Role			Ref.
Year	English	Korean	Director	Writer	Other	Ref.
2011	Moby Dick	모비딕	Yes	Yes (Note: With Park Sin-gyu)	—N/a	
2014	My Ordinary Love Story	내 연애의 기억	No	No	L	
2017	The Mayor	특별시민	Yes	Yes	—N/a	

=== Web series ===
Year	Title		Role		Ref.
Year	English	Korean	Director	Writer	Ref.
2020	Kingdom 2	킹덤	Yes	No	
2023	Moving	무빙	Yes (Note: With Park Yoon-seo)	No	

== Accolades ==
With six nominations, Moving was the most nominated series at the 2023 Asia Contents Awards & Global OTT Awards. All six nominations were won at the award show on October 8, 2023.

Award	Year	Category	Nominee(s) / work(s)	Result	Ref.
APAN Star Awards	2023	Best Director	Moving	Won	
Asia Contents Awards & Global OTT Awards	2023	Best Creative	Moving	Won	
Baeksang Arts Awards	2011	Best New Director — Film	Moby Dick	Nominated	
Baeksang Arts Awards	2011	Best Screenplay — Film	Moby Dick	Nominated	
Baeksang Arts Awards	2024	Best Director – Television	Moving	Nominated	
Cine21 Movie Award	2011	Best Screenplay of the Year	Moby Dick	Won	
Grand Bell Awards	2011	Best New Director	Moby Dick	Nominated	
Grand Bell Awards	2023	Best Series Director	Moving	Nominated	
Mise-en-scène Short Film Festival	2003	Grand Prize	The End of the Road	Won	
Seoul International Drama Awards	2024	Best Director	Moving	Won	
