= Lee Jung-ha =

South Korean actor (born 1998)

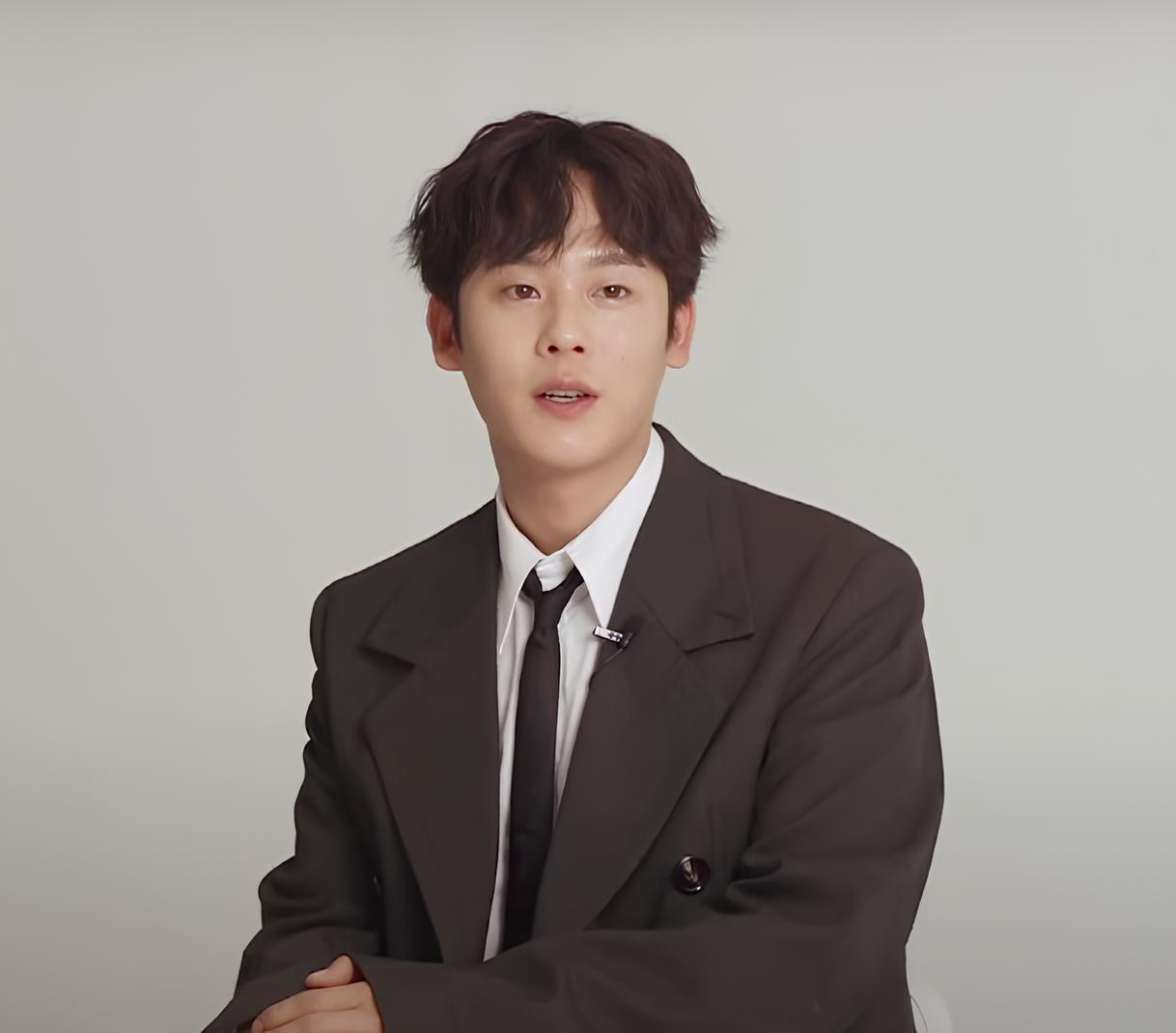
- Lee in October 2023
- Born: Lee Kwan-min; February 23, 1998 (age 28); Mokpo, South Korea
- Education: Dong Seoul University
- Occupation: Actor
- Years active: 2017–present
- Agent: Namoo Actors

Korean name
- Hangul: 이관민
- RR: I Gwanmin
- MR: I Kwanmin

Stage name
- Hangul: 이정하
- RR: I Jeongha
- MR: I Chŏngha

Lee Kwan-min (Korean: 이관민; born February 23, 1998), better known by the stage name Lee Jung-ha, is a South Korean actor. He played minor parts in television series such as Rookie Historian Goo Hae-ryung (2019), Run On (2020), and Nevertheless (2021), and gained worldwide recognition through his lead role in Moving (2023).

== Early life and education ==
Lee was born Lee Kwan-min and attended Dong Seoul University, Department of Visual Design. Lee enjoyed acting on stage during his school days. He was cast by JYP Entertainment, but left the company as he was not knowledgeable in dancing and singing; he soon regretted the decision.

== Career ==
In 2017, Lee pursued an acting career and made his debut in the web series Heart Attack Warning (2017). Lee also auditioned for the survival reality show The Unit (2017–2018). He later played minor roles in the television dramas Rookie Historian Goo Hae-ryung (2019), Run On (2020), and Nevertheless (2021).

In 2023, he starred in the Disney+ original series Moving, alongside an ensemble cast composed of Ryu Seung-ryong, Han Hyo-joo, Zo In-sung, Cha Tae-hyun, Ryoo Seung-bum, Kim Sung-kyun, Go Youn-jung, and Kim Do-hoon. The series received international attention and marked Lee's breakthrough in the industry.

== Filmography ==
=== Films ===
Year	Title	Role	Ref.
2023	It's Okay!	Do-yoon	
2024	Victory	Yoon Chi-hyung	

=== Television series ===
Year	Title	Role	Ref.
2019	Rookie Historian Goo Hae-ryung	Kim Chi-kook	
2020–2021	Run On	Kim Woo-shik	
2021	Nevertheless	Kim Eun-han	
2023–present	Moving	Kim Bong-seok	
2024	The Auditors	Goo Han-soo	
2025	One: High School Heroes	Kim Eui-gyeom	
2025	Good Boy	Lee Kyung-il	
2025	Heroes Next Door	Park Jeong-hwan	

=== Web series ===
Year	Title	Role	Ref.
2017	Heart Attack Warning	Jo-min	
2018	Want More 19	Ma Tae-hee	
2019	Freshman	Cha Do-jin	
2019	Travel Story	Dong-hye	

=== Television shows ===
Year	Title	Role	Notes	Ref.
2017	The Unit: Idol Rebooting Project	Contestant		
2023–present	Show! Music Core	Host	with Younghoon (The Boyz) and Sullyoon (Nmixx)	
2024	Apartment 404	Cast Member	with Yoo Jae-seok, Cha Tae-hyun, Oh Na-ra, Yang Se-chan and Jennie	

== Accolades ==
=== Awards and nominations ===
Name of the award ceremony, year presented, award category, nominee(s) of the award, and the result of the nomination
Award	Year	Category	Nominee(s) / Work(s)	Result	Ref.
APAN Star Awards	2023	Best New Actor	Moving	Nominated	
Asia Contents Awards & Global OTT Awards	2023	Best Newcomer Actor	Moving	Won	
Baeksang Arts Awards	2024	Best New Actor – Television	Moving	Won	
Blue Dragon Series Awards	2024	Best New Actor	Moving	Won	
Cine21 Film Awards	2024	Best New Actor	Moving	Won	
Korea First Brand Awards	2024	Rookie Male Actor (OTT)	Lee Jung-ha	Won	

=== Listicles ===
Name of publisher, year listed, name of listicle, and placement
Publisher	Year	Listicle	Placement	Ref.
Cine21	2024	2024 Entertainment Trend-New Actor to Watch	1st	
