= Moby Dick (2011 film) =

- Theatrical release poster
- Hangul: 모비딕
- RR: Mobidik
- MR: Mobidik
- Directed by: Park In-je
- Written by: Park In-je; Park Shin-kyu
- Produced by: Oh Young-suk
- Starring: Hwang Jung-min; Jin Goo; Kim Min-hee; Kim Sang-ho
- Production company: Palette Pictures
- Distributed by: Showbox
- Release date: 9 June 2011
- Running time: 112 minutes
- Country: South Korea
- Language: Korean
- Box office: US$3.1 million

Moby Dick (Korean: 모비딕) is a 2011 South Korean thriller film written by Park In-je and Park Shin-kyu, directed by Park In-je, and starring Hwang Jung-min, Jin Goo, Kim Min-hee and Kim Sang-ho.

== Plot ==
In winter 1994, an explosion occurs at the fictional Balam Bridge on the outskirts of Seoul and is attributed to terrorists. Social affairs reporter Lee Bang-woo (Hwang) begins to investigate the case when an old friend, Yoon-hyuk (Jin), hands him some secret documents and claims that the explosion was committed intentionally by the government. Lee teams up with fellow journalists Sung Hyo-kwan (Kim Min-hee) and Son Jin-ki (Kim Sang-ho) to pursue the truth. Their investigation reveals what seems to be a secret group that operates the government, and they begin to unravel a string of conspiracies that become far deadlier than they anticipated.

== Cast ==
- Hwang Jung-min as Lee Bang-woo
- Jin Goo as Yoon-hyuk
- Kim Min-hee as Sung Hyo-kwan
- Kim Sang-ho as Son Jin-ki
- Han Soo-yeon as Seo Eun-sook
- Kim Min-Jae as Kim Yong-sung
- Lee Geung-young as Professor Jang
- Jung Man-sik as Nam Seon-soo
- Jo Hee-bong as Im Jik-sa
- Bae Seong-woo as President Maeng
- Ahn Gil-kang as Detective Ma
- Kim Bo-yeon as Director Jo

== Production ==
The film is the feature directing debut of Park In-je, grand prizewinner of the 2003 Mise-en-Scene Genre Film Festival. Park was working on a screenplay about a reporter when he came across an account of Private Yun Seok-yang, a soldier at the Defense Security Command of Korea's Armed Forces. In 1990 Yun deserted his camp, carrying a floppy disk that contained a list of national leaders, including former presidents, religious leaders, politicians, and social activists, that the DSC had been illegally investigating; he made a declaration of conscience and revealed the contents of the disk at a press conference. Moby Dick, loosely based on Yun's story, follows a journalist's attempts to investigate a secret organization that controls the government. The title Moby Dick alludes to Herman Melville's novel Moby-Dick by conjuring up an overwhelming entity whose size makes it impossible to see all at once; Moby Dick was also the name of a café near Seoul University that was used by the DSC to investigate ordinary citizens. Starring actor Hwang Jung-min interviewed bureau-level reporters to help prepare for his role.

The film was shot during the coldest winter in South Korea in 30 years. Shooting began in mid-October 2010 and ended in February 2011, with the cast and crew enduring the cold for five months.

== Reception ==
The film was released on June 9, 2011, to generally positive reviews for its 90s-era settings, moody cinematography, and cast performances. It grossed around $3 million at the South Korean box office.

== Accolades ==
Award	Year	Category	Nominee(s) / work(s)	Result	Ref.
Cine21 Movie Award	2011	Best Screenplay of the Year	Park In-je and Park Shin-kyu	Won	
Baeksang Arts Awards	2011	Best New Director — Film	Park In-je	Nominated	
Baeksang Arts Awards	2011	Best Screenplay — Film	Park In-je and Park Shin-kyu	Nominated	
Grand Bell Awards	2011	Best New Director	Park In-je	Nominated	
Grand Bell Awards	2011	Best Supporting Actor	Kim Sang-ho	Nominated	
Grand Bell Awards	2011	Best Planning	You Jeong-hun	Nominated	
