= Global OTT Awards =

South Korean OTT awards ceremony

- Current: 2026 Global OTT Awards; June 20, 2026
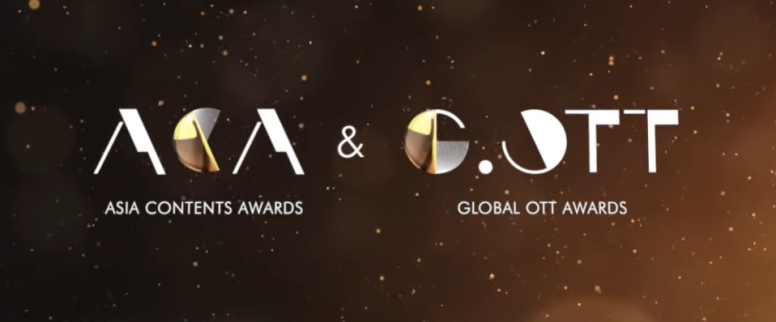
- Awarded for: The achievements of excellent content made for TV, OTT, and online across Asia
- Country: South Korea
- Presented by: Ministry of Science and ICT; Busan Metropolitan City
- Formerly called: Asia Contents Awards & Global OTT Awards
- First award: 2019; 7 years ago
- Website: Official website

The Global OTT Awards is an annual ceremony recognizing excellence in Asian streaming content. As of 2025, it serves as the flagship event of the International Streaming Festival (Korean: 국제스트리밍페스티벌), presented by Ministry of Science and ICT and Busan Metropolitan City. The ceremony is hosted jointly by the Korea International Streaming Festival (KISF) and the Information and Communication Industry Promotion Agency.

== History ==
The event, originally known as the Asia Contents Awards, was established in 2019 as part of the Asian Film Market during the 24th Busan International Film Festival held from October 3 to October 12, 2019. The ceremony took place on October 6, with 9 award categories including Best Creative, Best Asian Drama, Best Actor, Best Actress, Best Writer, Best Rising Star, Newcomer, Lifetime Achievement Award, and Excellence Award. The Award recognizes contents from Korea, China, and Japan.

In 2023, the awards were rebranded to the Asia Contents Awards & Global OTT Awards (아시아콘텐츠어워즈&글로벌OTT어워즈; abbreviated ACA & G. OTT) through a partnership with the International OTT Festival, the Ministry of Science and ICT and Busan Metropolitan City. The 2023 edition took place on October 8, held in conjunction with the 28th Busan International Film Festival. It was followed by the 2024 edition on October 6, 2024.

The ceremony features 17 categories, following the addition of five new awards. The program is divided into 10 competitive categories and seven invitational honors, such as the Lifetime Achievement Award and Rising Star of the Year. To acknowledge the evolving industry landscape, the event also presents awards specifically to OTT service providers.

== Ceremonies ==
Year	Date	Venue	City	Host	Ref.
Asia Contents Awards (ACA)
2019	October 6, 2019	Sohyang Theater, Dongseo University	Busan, South Korea	Yoo Teo and Kim Sae-yeon	
2020	October 25, 2020	online		Nichkhun and Kim Sae-yeon	
2021	October 7, 2021	online		Mark Tetto and Kim Sae-yeon	
2022	October 8, 2022	BIFF Theater, Busan Cinema Center	Busan, South Korea	Jung Hae-in and Kim Sae-yeon	
Asia Contents Awards & Global OTT Awards (ACA & G.OTT Awards)
2023	October 8, 2023	BIFF Theater, Busan Cinema Center	Busan, South Korea	Kim Kang-woo and Nancy	
2024	October 6, 2024	BIFF Theater, Busan Cinema Center	Busan, South Korea	Kang Ki-young and Tiffany Young	
Global OTT Awards
2025	August 24, 2025	BIFF Theater, Busan Cinema Center	Busan, South Korea	Joo Jong-hyuk and Lee Hye-sung	
2026	June 20, 2026	BIFF Theater, Busan Cinema Center	Busan, South Korea	Ahn Jae-hyun and Kang So-ra	

== Awards category ==
There are 19 award categories including 5 newly added awards in 2023 and 2 added in 2024. The Awards celebrates 11 awards in competition and 8 awards by invitation.

=== Open competition ===
- Best Creative: This award honours a content with notable achievement among the nominations.
- Best OTT Original: This award is for the outstanding OTT Original content among the nominations.
- Best Asian TV Series: An outstanding Asian TV series among the nominations gets this award.
- Best Reality and Variety: The outstanding reality and variety show among the nominations for the year is the recipient of this award.
- Best Director
- Best Writer
- Best Lead Actor & Actress
- Best Supporting Actor & Actress
- Best Newcomer Actor & Actress
- Best Visual Effects
- Best Original Song: Introduced from 2024, it features memorable tracks that have resonated with the audience.

=== Invitation ===
- Creative Beyond Border: This award is given to honor the content that has pioneered a new genre on OTT.
- New Technology: This award honors outstanding platform that utilize emerging ICT technology.
- Special Contribution for K-Content: To honour the platforms, networks, production houses, and artists who contribute to the proliferation of Korean content worldwide, this award is given.
- Special Contribution for OTT Industry: This award honors the OTT service providers and partners who have contributed to the development of OTT industry worldwide.
- Lifetime Achievement Award: This award is given to a TV station, media platform, production house, or a creative artist who has made notable contributions worldwide.
- ACA Excellence Award: A creative artist who makes notable contributions around the world is honoured with this award.
- Rising Star of the Year: The most notable artist among the nominations gets the rising star award.
- People’s Choice Award: Introduced in 2024, this award will allow fans to vote for their favorite actors.
- Best Short-form of the Year

== Winners open competition ==
=== Best Creative ===
Year	Winner	Creator	Country	Ref.
2019	Mr. Sunshine	Studio Dragon	South Korea	
2020	The World of the Married	JTBC Studios	South Korea	
2020	The Bad Kids	iQIYI	China	
2021	Move to Heaven	Netflix	South Korea	
2022	Extraordinary Attorney Woo	ENA, Netflix	South Korea	
2023	Moving	Disney+	South Korea	
2024	Blossoms Shanghai	Tencent Video	China	
2025	When Life Gives You Tangerines	Pan Entertainment	South Korea	
2026	You and Everything Else	Kakao Entertainment	South Korea	

=== Best OTT Original ===
Year	Winner	Creator	Country	Ref.
2021	The Long Night	iQIYI	China	
2023	Weak Hero Class 1	Wavve	South Korea	
2024	Boyhood	Coupang Play	South Korea	
2025	Nine Puzzles	Kakao Entertainment	South Korea	
2026	The Price of Confession	Studio Dragon	South Korea	

=== Best Asian TV Series ===
Year	Winner	Creator	Country	Ref.
2023	Scoop	Matchbox Shots, Netflix	India	
2024	1286	Salem Social Media	Kazakhstan	
2025	The Outlaw Doctor	GrX Studio	Taiwan	
2026	The Silent Noise	ABS-CBN Studios	Philippines	

=== Best Reality and Variety ===
Year	Winner	Creator	Country	Ref.
2023	Physical 100	Netflix	South Korea	
2023	Let's Feast Vietnam	BHD Vietnam Media Corp	Vietnam	
2024	2 Faces	Workpoint Group	Thailand	
2024	Jinny's Kitchen 2	Egg is Coming	South Korea	
2025	World of Street Woman Fighter	Mnet	South Korea	
2026	Badly in Love	Staff Labbi	Japan	

=== Best Asian Drama ===
Year	Winner	Creator	Country	Ref.
2019	Faculty	Mediacorp	Singapore	
2019	Hormones: The Series Season 3	GTH	Thailand	
2020	Last Madame	Ochre Pictures	Singapore	
2020	When the Camellia Blooms	Pan Entertainment	South Korea	
2021	Girl from Nowhere Season 2	GMM 25, Netflix	Thailand	
Best Asian Animation
2021	Heaven's Design Team	Asahi Production	Japan	
2022	The Orbital Children	Production +h	Japan	
Best Asian Documentary
2022	The Atom Araullo Specials: Young Arms	ENA, GMA Network	Philippines	

=== Best Short-Form/Web Drama ===
Year	Winner	Creator	Country	Ref.
2021	Sheker	Salem Social Media	Kazakhstan	

=== Best Lead Actress ===
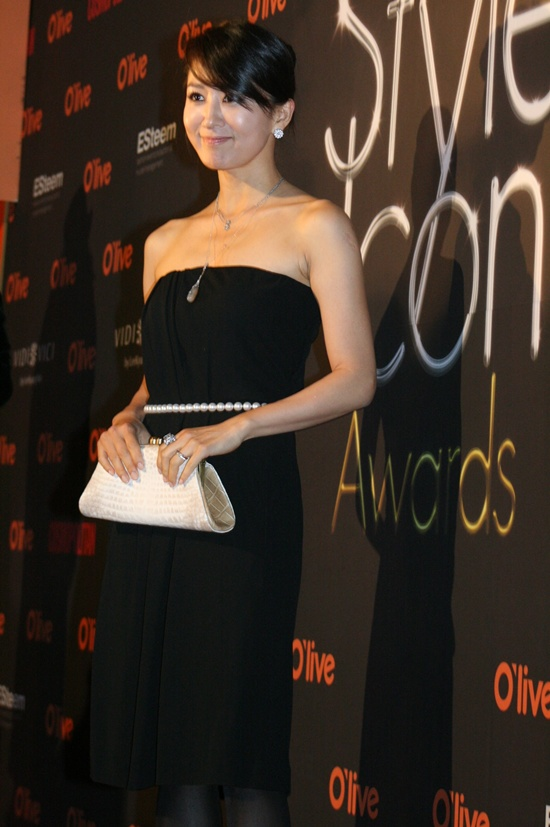
Kim Hee-ae, winner of 2020 Best Lead Actress Award for The World of the Married

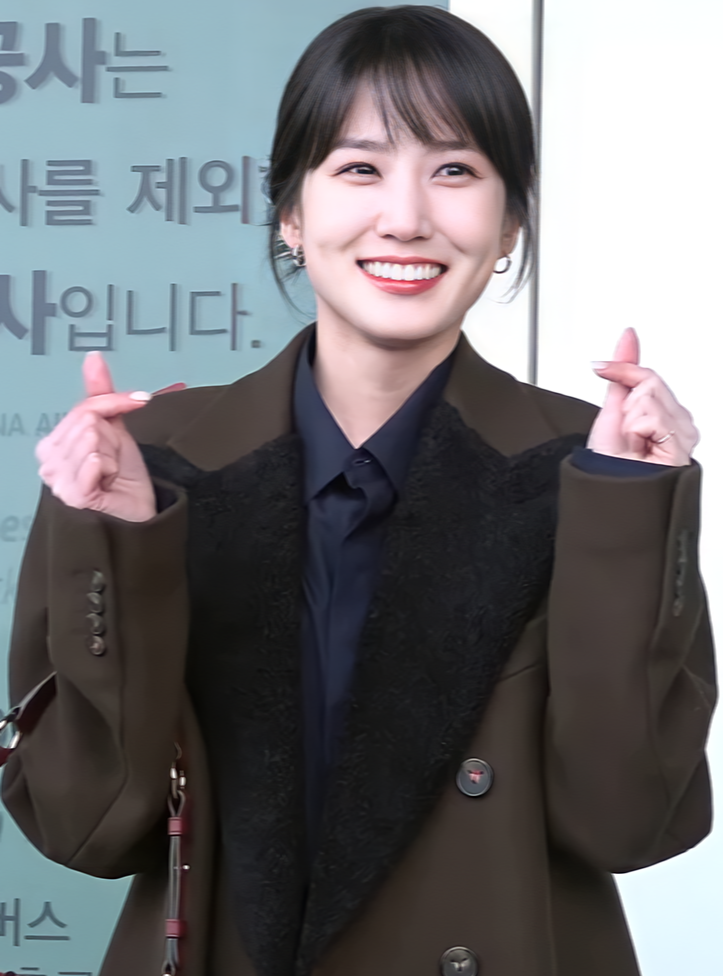
Park Eun-bin, winner of 2022 and 2025 Best Lead Actress Award for Extraordinary Attorney Woo and for Hyper Knife

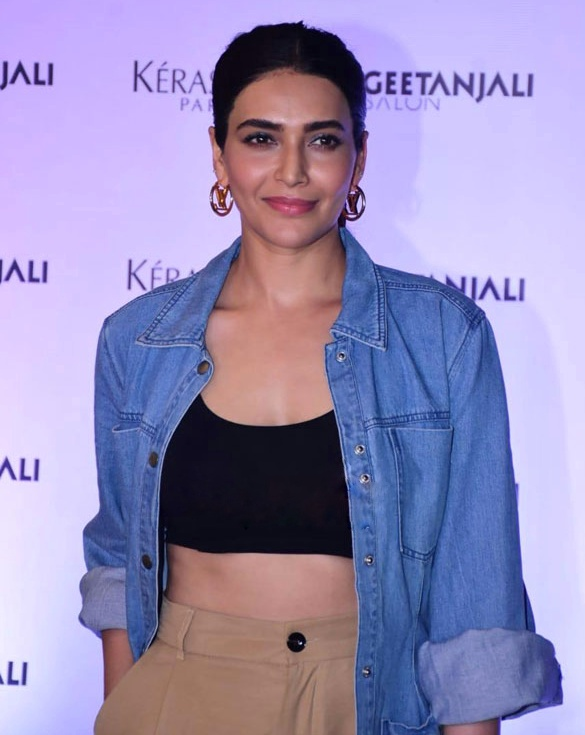
Karishma Tanna, winner of 2023 Best Lead Actress award for Scoop

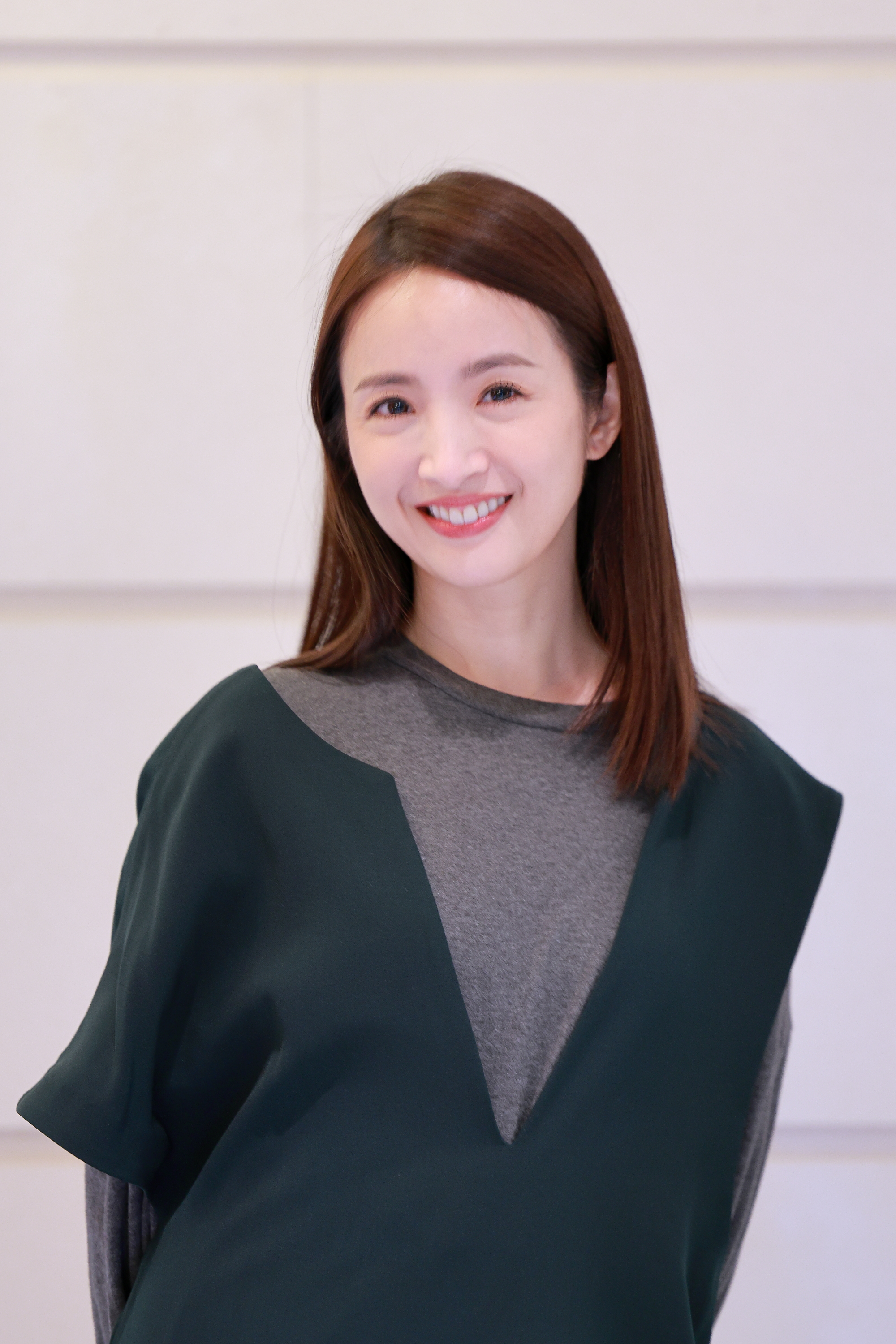
Ariel Lin, winner of 2024 Best Lead Actress award for Imperfect Us

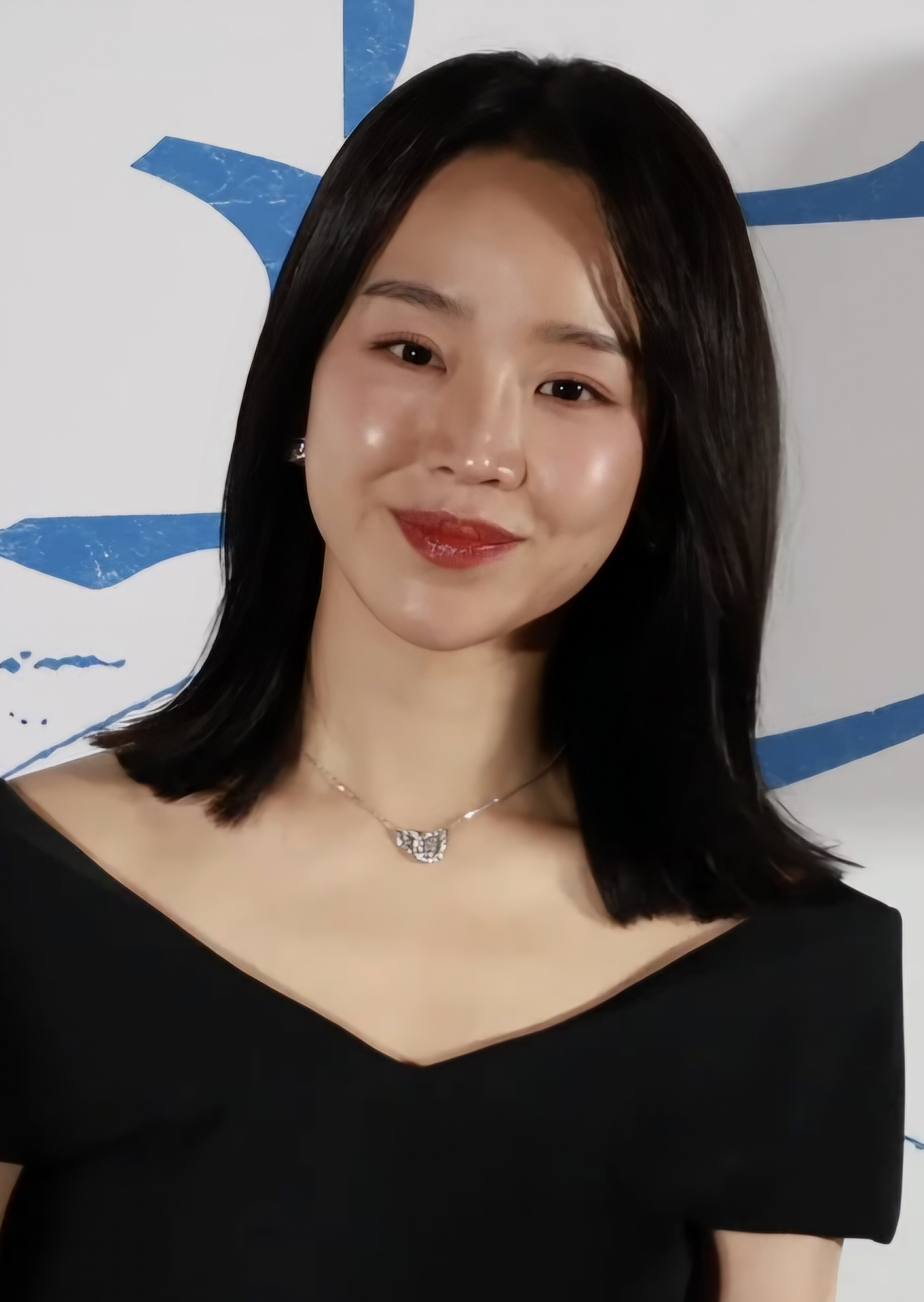
Shin Hye-sun, winner of 2026 Best Lead Actress award for The Art of Sarah

Year	Winner	Work	Country	Ref.
2019	Yao Chen	All Is Well	China	
2019	Maja Salvador	Wild Flower	Philippines	
2020	Kim Hee-ae	The World of the Married	South Korea	
2020	Haru Kuroki	Nagi's Long Vacation	Japan	
2021	Song Jia	A Love for Dilemma	China	
2022	Park Eun-bin	Extraordinary Attorney Woo	South Korea	
2023	Karishma Tanna	Scoop	India	
2024	Ariel Lin	Imperfect Us	Taiwan	
2025	Park Eun-bin	Hyper Knife	South Korea	
2026	Shin Hye-sun	The Art of Sarah	South Korea	

=== Best Lead Actor ===
Year	Winner	Work	Country	Ref.
2019	Lei Jiayin	The Longest Day in Chang'an	China	
2019	Kim Nam-gil	The Fiery Priest	South Korea	
2019	Takayuki Yamada	The Naked Director	Japan	
2020	Joseph Chang	The Victims' Game	Taiwan	
2020	Ju Ji-hoon	Kingdom Season 2	South Korea	
2021	Lee Je-hoon	Move to Heaven	South Korea	
2022	Ryohei Suzuki	Tokyo MER: Mobile Emergency Room	Japan	
2023	Ryu Seung-ryong	Moving	South Korea	
2024	Hu Ge	Blossoms Shanghai	China	
2025	Kentaro Sakaguchi	What Comes After Love	South Korea, Japan	
2026	Tseng Jing-hua	Had I Not Seen the Sun	Taiwan	

=== Best Supporting Actress ===
Year	Winner	Work	Country	Ref.
2022	Sora Ma	This Land Is Mine	Singapore	
2023	Lim Ji-yeon	The Glory	South Korea	
2024	Yeom Hye-ran	Mask Girl	South Korea	
2025	Yeom Hye-ran	When Life Gives You Tangerines	South Korea	
2026	Nana	Climax	South Korea	

=== Best Supporting Actor ===
Year	Winner	Work	Country	Ref.
2022	Park Hae-soo	Squid Game	South Korea	
2023	Hsueh Shih-ling	Taiwan Crime Stories	Taiwan	
2024	Ahn Jae-hong	Mask Girl	South Korea	
2025	Oh Jung-se	Good Boy	South Korea	
2026	Jung Sung-il	Made in Korea	South Korea	

=== Best Director ===
Year	Winner	Work	Country	Ref.
2023	Xin Shuang	The Long Season	China	
2024	Kamila Andini	Cigarette Girl	Indonesia	
2024	Ifa Isfansyah	Cigarette Girl	Indonesia	
2025	Yao Xiaofeng	Northward	China	
2026	Li Xue	Born to Be Alive	China	

=== Best Writer ===
Year	Winner	Work	Country	Ref.
2019	Park Hae-young	My Mister	South Korea	
2019	Lu Shih-yuan	The World Between Us	Taiwan	
2020	Kim Eun-hee	Kingdom Season 2	South Korea	
2021	Yoon Ji-ryeon	Move to Heaven	South Korea	
2022	Wang Xiaoshuai	The Pavilion	China	
2022	Yang Yishu	The Pavilion	China	
2023	Kang Full	Moving	South Korea	
2024	Joo Hwa-mi	The Atypical Family	South Korea	
2025	Lim Sang-choon	When Life Gives You Tangerines	South Korea	
2026	Kwon Jong-gwan	The Price of Confession	South Korea	

=== Best Newcomer Actress ===
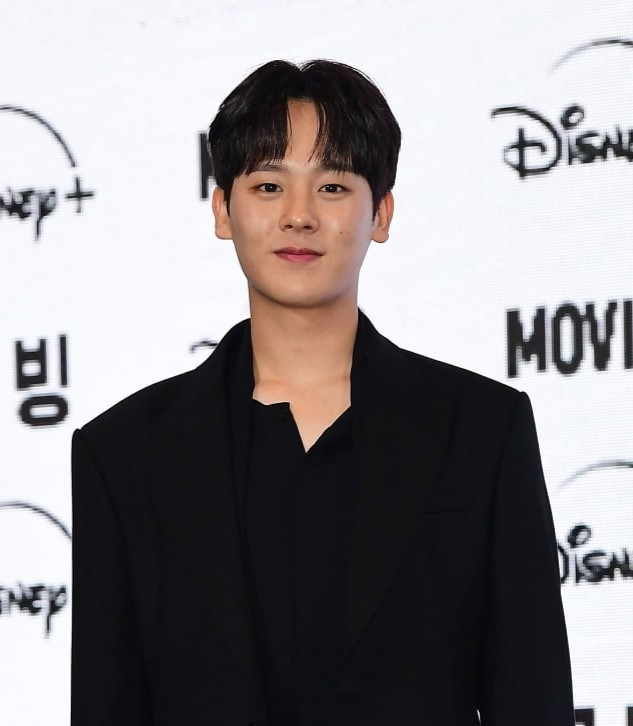
Lee Jung-ha, winner of New Actor Award for Moving

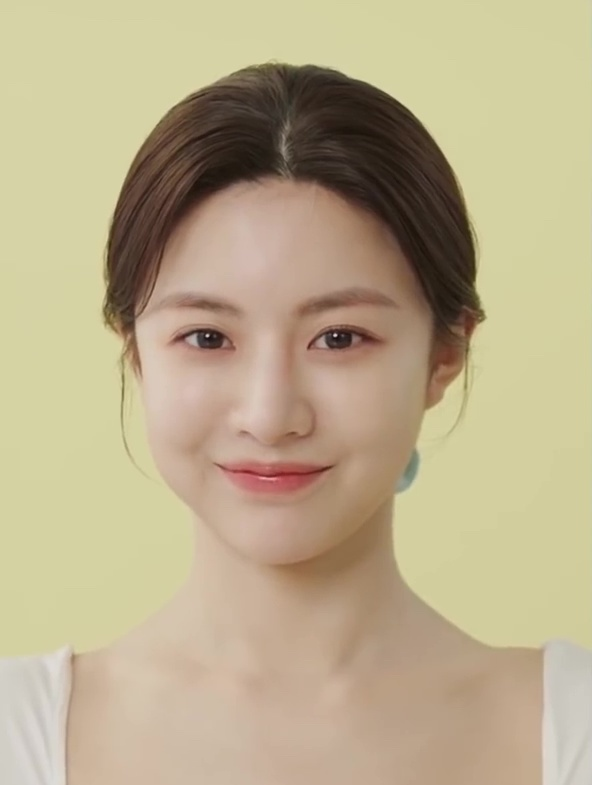
Go Youn-jung, winner of Best Newcomer Actress for Moving

Winners of 2023 Best Newcomer Award

Year	Winner	Work	Country	Ref..
2019	Sananthachat Thanapatpisal	Hormones: The Series	Thailand	
2019	Kemisara Paladesh	Hormones: The Series	Thailand	
2019	Sabrina Zhuang	Mountains and Ocean	China	
2019	Morita Misato	The Naked Director	Japan	
2020	Plearnpichaya Komalarajun	One Year:The Series	Thailand	
2020	Jeon Mi-do	Hospital Playlist	South Korea	
2021	Koe Yeet	Titoudao	Singapore	
2021	Go Min-si	Sweet Home	South Korea	
2022	Bao Shangen	Love Behind the Melody	China	
2023	Go Youn-jung	Moving	South Korea	
2024	Nimura Sawa	Shut Up	Japan	
2025	Chung Su-bin	Friendly Rivalry	South Korea	
2026	Bang Hyo-rin	Aema	South Korea	
2026	Leah Dou	Her	China	

=== Best Newcomer Actor ===
Year	Winner	Work	Country	Ref..
2019	Jin Xiong Hao	Mountains and Ocean	China	
2020	Paris Intarakomalyasut	In Family We Trust	Thailand	
2020	Rong Zishan	The Bad Kids	China	
2021	Win Morisaki	The Real Thing	Japan	
2022	Ryusei Yokohama	The Journalist	Japan	
2023	Lee Jung-ha	Moving	South Korea	
2024	Chae Jong-hyeop	Eye Love You	Japan	
2024	Kim Yo-han	A Killer Paradox	South Korea	
2025	Kang You-seok	Resident Playbook	South Korea	
2026	Lee Ki-taek	The Practical Guide to Love	South Korea	

=== Best Original Song ===
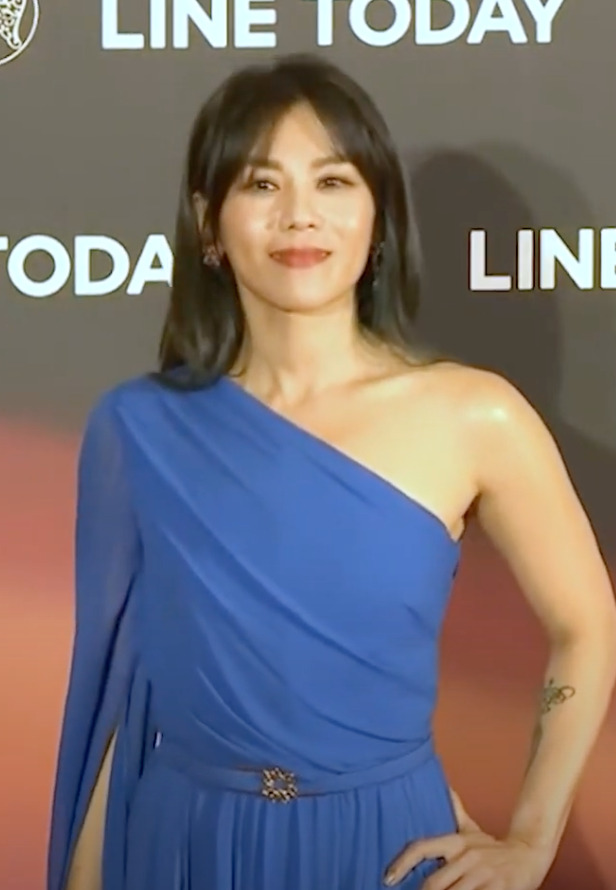
Tanya Chua, winner of 2024 Best Original Song for "Learn to Live Again" from Imperfect Us

Year	Winner song	Series	Singer	Country	Ref.
2024	"Learn to Live Again"	Imperfect Us	Tanya Chua	Taiwan	
2025	"Who Saw the Peacock Dance in the Jungle?"	Who Saw the Peacock Dance in the Jungle?	ADO	Japan	
2026	"Love Language"	Can This Love Be Translated?	Kim Min-seok	South Korea	

=== Best Visual Effects ===
Year	Winner	Creator	Country	Ref.
2020	Kingdom Season 2	AStory	South Korea	
2021	Sweet Home	Studio Dragon, Studio N	South Korea	
2022	Squid Game	Netflix	South Korea	
2023	Moving	Disney+	South Korea	
2024	Parasyte: The Grey	Netflix	South Korea	
2025	I Am Nobody: The Showdown Between Yin & Yang	Youku	China	
2026	Agent from Above	Netflix	Taiwan	

== Winners – invitation ==
=== Rising Star of the Year ===
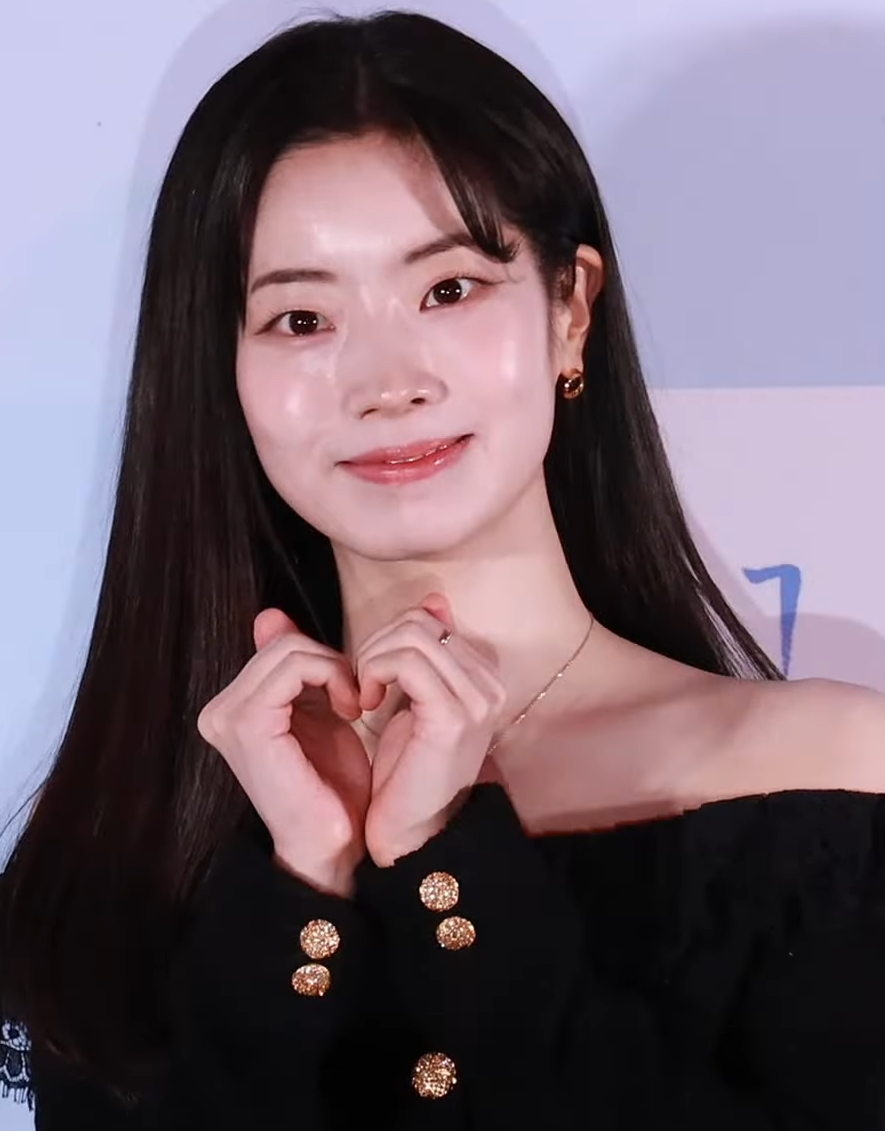
Dahyun, winner of 2026 Rising Star of the Year for Love Me

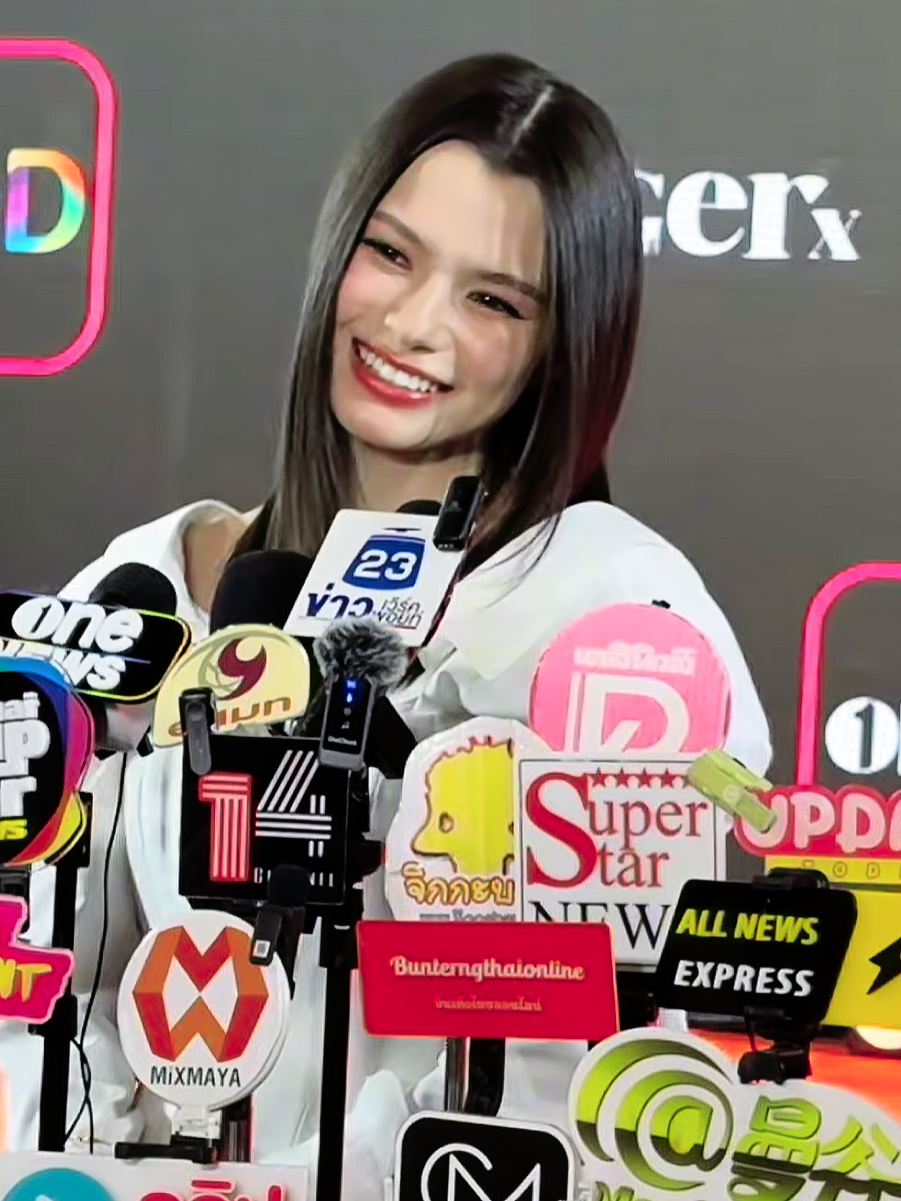
Becky Armstrong, winner of 2026 Rising Star of the Year for Girl from Nowhere: The Reset

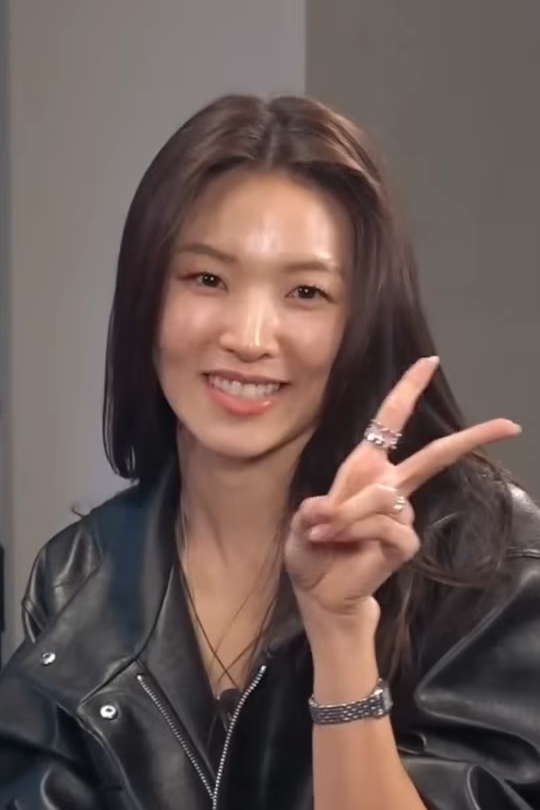
Choi Mina Sue, winner of 2026 Rising Star of the Year for Single's Inferno Season 5

Winners of Rising Star of the Year

Year	Winner	Work	Country	Ref.
2019	Fang Rong	Faculty	Singapore	
2020	Dilraba Dilmurat	Eternal Love of Dream	China	
2020	Kirti Kulhari	Four More Shots Please!	India	
2020	Sayani Gupta	Four More Shots Please!	India	
2020	Maanvi Gagroo	Four More Shots Please!	India	
2020	Gurbani Judge	Four More Shots Please!	India	
2020	Ririn Dwi Ariyanti	Dewi	Indonesia	
2022	Kim Min-ha	Pachinko	South Korea	
2022	Ling Man-lung	In Geek We Trust	Hong Kong	
2023	Wen Junhui	Exclusive Fairy Tale	China	
2023	Buffy Chen	Wave Makers	Taiwan	
2024	Anson Kong	Warriors Within 2	Hong Kong	
2024	Ayaka Miyoshi	Globe-Trotter Travel Guidebook	Japan	
2024	Jo Yoon-su	The Tyrant	South Korea	
2025	Shi Pengyuan	A Life For A Life	China	
2025	Lee Su-hyun	Family Matters	South Korea	
2026	Becky Armstrong	Girl from Nowhere: The Reset	Thailand	
2026	Dahyun	Love Me	South Korea	
2026	Choi Mina Sue	Single's Inferno Season 5	South Korea	

=== People's Choice Award (Male) ===
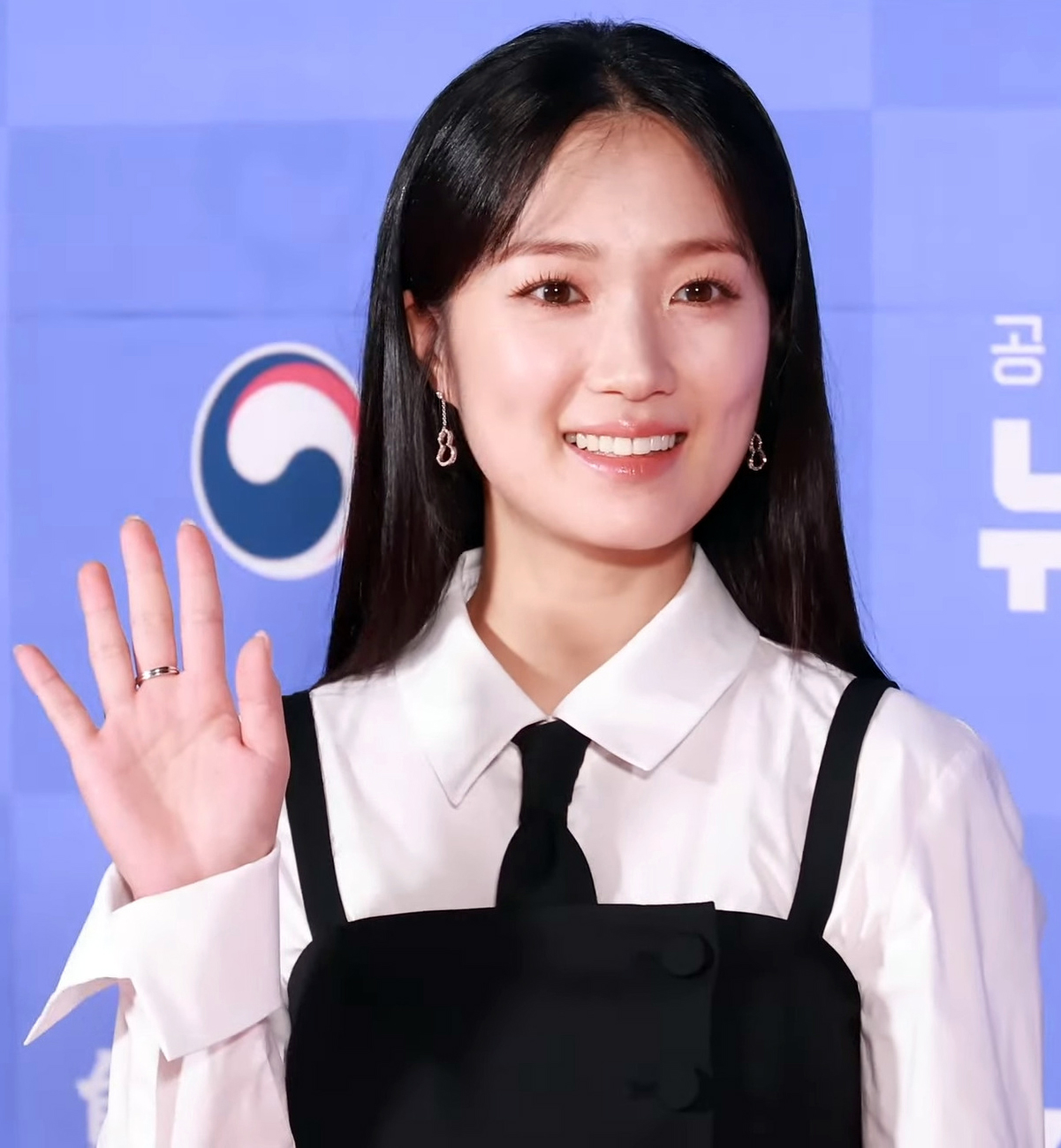
Kim Hye-yoon, winner of 2024 People's Choice Award (Female)

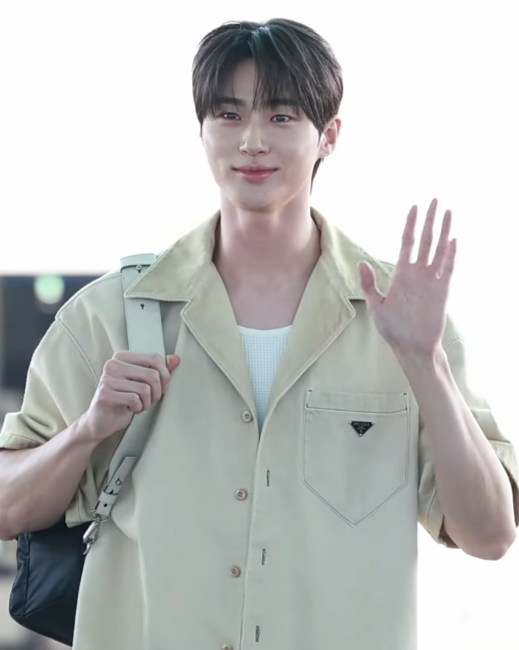
Byeon Woo-seok, winner of People's Choice Award (Male)

Winners of People's Choice Award

Year	Winner	Work	Country	Ref.
2024	Byeon Woo-seok	Lovely Runner	South Korea	
2025	Bai Jingting	The First Frost	China	
2026	Song Weilong	Shine on Me	China	

=== People's Choice Award (Female) ===
Year	Winner	Work	Country	Ref.
2024	Kim Hye-yoon	Lovely Runner	South Korea	
2025	Bai Lu	Northward	China	
2026	Tian Xiwei	Pursuit of Jade	China	

=== Lifetime Achievement Award ===
Year	Winner	Work	Country	Ref.
2019	Raymond Lee Wai-Man	Flying Tiger	Hong Kong	
2020	Amuse Inc.	Entertainment company	Japan	
2020	ABS-CBN	Commercial broadcast network	Philippines	
2022	Tatsuo Kawamura	Producer	Japan	
2023	Kim Jong-hak	Director and producer	South Korea	

=== Excellence Award ===
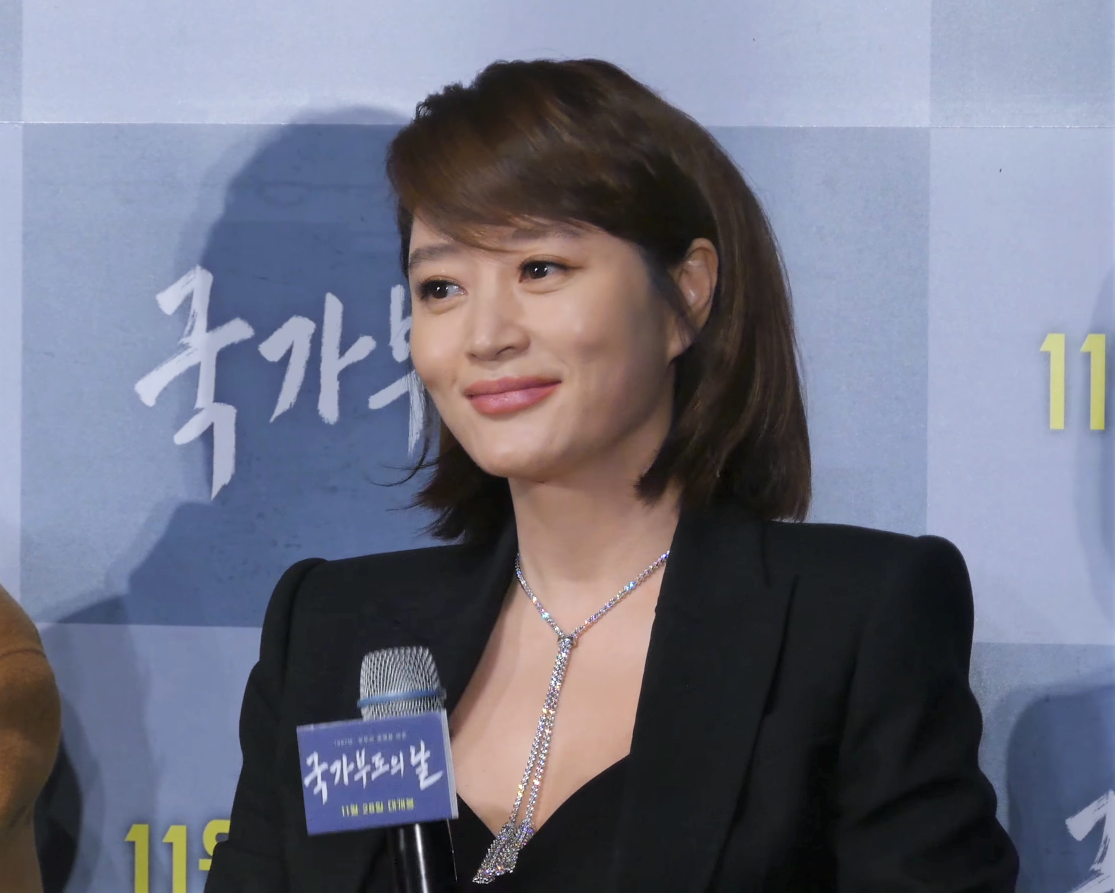
Kim Hye-soo, winner of 2020 Excellence Award

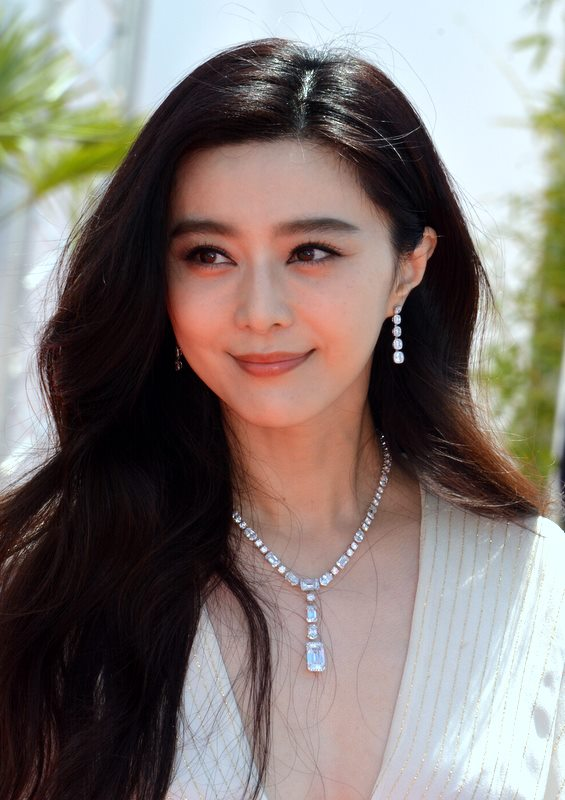
Fan Bingbing, winner of 2022 Excellence Award

Winners of Excellence Award

Year	Winner	Work	Country	Ref.
2019	Kim Jae-joong	Singer, songwriter, actor and director	South Korea	
2020	Kim Hye-soo	Hyena	South Korea	
2020	Yuko Araki	Actress and model	Japan	
2021	Song Kang	Sweet Home	South Korea	
2022	Fan Bingbing	Actress	China	
2023	Yuya Yagira	Gannibal	Japan	

=== Creative Beyond Border ===
Year	Winner	Creator	Country	Ref.
2021	Bad Genius	GDH 559	Thailand	
2021	Alice in Borderland	Netflix	Japan	
2023	EXchange Season 2	TVING	South Korea	
2023	One Day Off	Wavve	South Korea	
2024	Shaman: Whispers From The Dead	TVING	South Korea	
2025	Life Line	Independent	South Korea	
2026	Show Me the Money 12: Yaksha's World	Mnet	South Korea	

=== New Technology ===
Year	Winner	Work	Country	Ref.
2023	TVING	OTT video streaming platform	South Korea	
2024	Kocowa	OTT video streaming platform	United States	
2025	Binge korea	OTT video streaming platform	South Korea	
2026	LG Channels	OTT video streaming platform	South Korea	

=== Special Contribution for OTT Industry ===
Year	Winner	Work	Country	Ref.
2023	Watcha	OTT video streaming platform	South Korea	

=== Special Contribution for K-Content ===
Year	Winner	Work	Country	Ref.
2023	Viu	OTT video streaming platform	Hong Kong	
2023	Wavve Americas	OTT video streaming platform	USA	

=== Best Creator ===
Year	Winner	Work	Country	Ref.
2022	The Pinkfong Company	Entertainment company	South Korea	

=== Achievement Award ===
Year	Winner	Work	Country	Ref.
2022	Song Byung-joon	Composer	South Korea	

=== ACA Jury's Special Award ===
Year	Winner	Creator	Country	Ref.
2021	Naoki Hanzawa	TBS	Japan	

=== Best Short-form of the Year ===
Year	Winner	Country	Ref.
2026	Dreaming Busan	South Korea	

== See also ==
- List of Asian television awards
