= Go Youn-jung =

South Korean actress (born 1996)

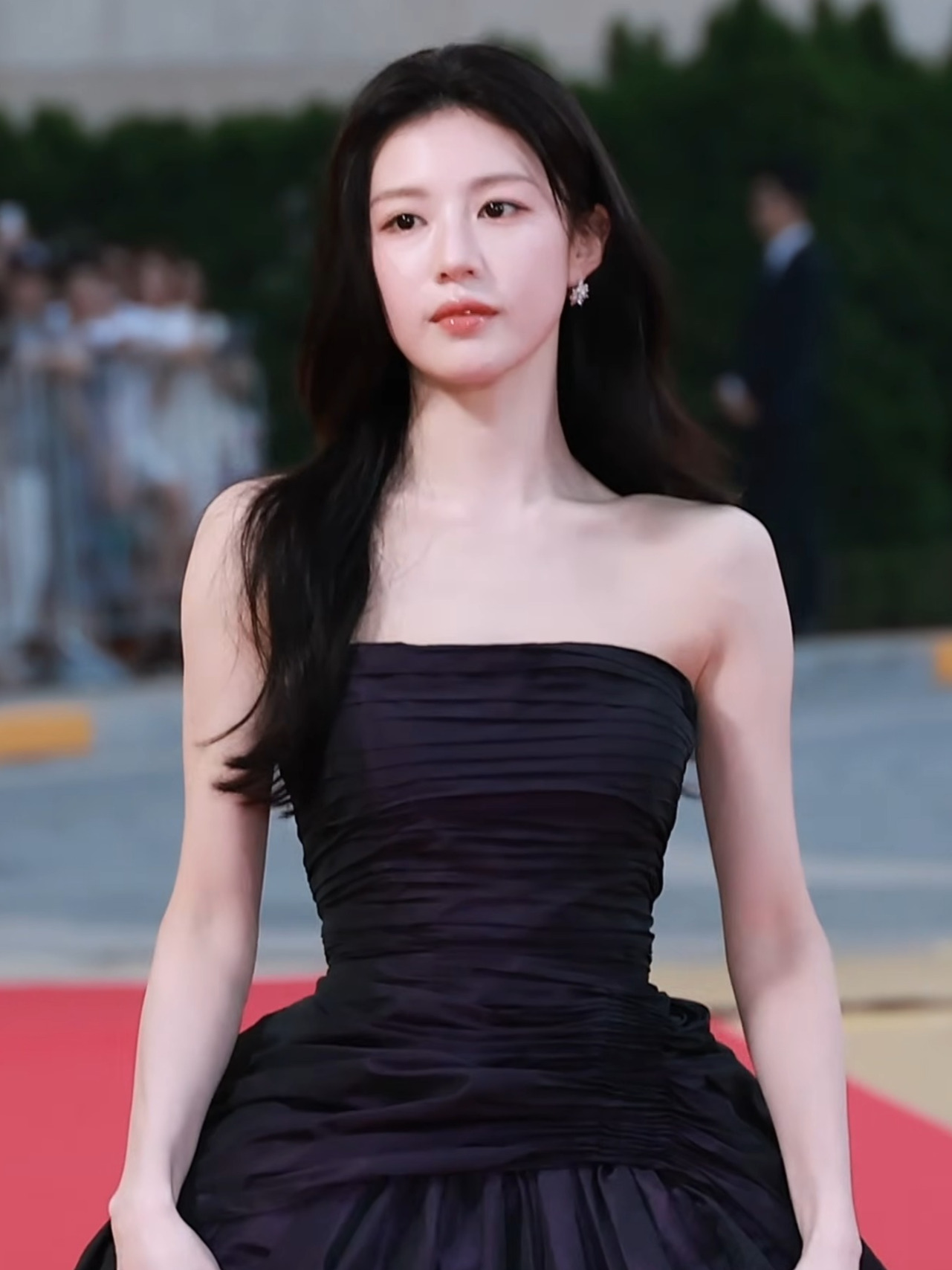
- Go in July 2026
- Born: April 22, 1996 (age 30); Seoul, South Korea
- Education: Seoul Women's University
- Occupations: Actress; model
- Years active: 2019–present
- Agent: AAP

Korean name
- Hangul: 고윤정
- RR: Go Yunjeong
- MR: Ko Yunjŏng
- Website: maa.co.kr

Go Youn-jung (Korean: 고윤정; born on April 22, 1996) is a South Korean actress and model. She had her breakthrough with her debut film The Hunt (2022) and streaming series Moving (2023), both of which earned her several accolades.

Go made her acting debut in the television series He Is Psychometric (2019) and gained recognition for her supporting roles in Netflix production Sweet Home (2020) and Law School (2021). She then transitioned into leading roles with the second season of Alchemy of Souls (2022–2023), Resident Playbook (2025), and Can This Love Be Translated? (2026).

== Early life and education ==
Go was born on April 22, 1996, in Seoul, South Korea, and attended Seoul Women's University, where she studied contemporary art. During her college years, Go accepted a request to model for a photoshoot from a senior in the Department of Photography. This eventually led her to apply to lifestyle magazine University Tomorrow, where she was chosen as the cover model for issue 771. Following her cover feature, she received numerous casting offers from entertainment agencies, all of which she initially declined.

== Career ==
=== 2019–2021: Beginnings ===
After graduating from Seoul Women's University, she joined MAA Entertainment as a model and actress. She began her career by modeling for various commercials, including those for Nike, Armani, Ritz Crackers, and SK Telecom. Go earned income through modeling and used the funds to finance acting lessons. After approximately six months of training, she participated in the final audition for the film Parasite in what was her first attempt at a professional role, but she was not selected. This experience reportedly motivated her to commit seriously to acting. That same year, Go made her debut in the television series He Is Psychometric, playing Kim So-hyun, a single mother.

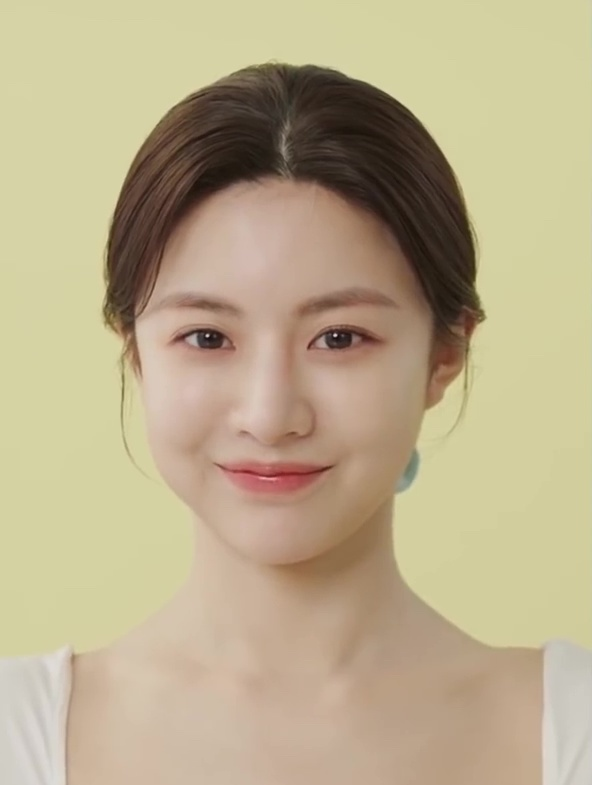
Go in June 2021

In 2020, Go made a cameo in the Netflix original series The School Nurse Files, as Choi Yoo-jin, one of the students. That same year, she appeared in the Netflix original series Sweet Home as Park Yu-ri, the caregiver of a terminally-ill senior, An Gil-seob (played by Kim Kap-soo). Sweet Home significant global achievement, peaking at number one on Netflix charts in eight Asian countries and number three globally, expanding Go's industry visibility. Go and her fellow actresses were praised for breaking stereotypes of female characters.

In 2021, Go starred as Jeon Ye-seul in Law School, earning acknowledgment for her portrayal of a law student who suffered dating violence. In March 2021, she was cast in her first feature film, a South Korean espionage action thriller film titled Hunt. She was reported to be making a special appearance in the tvN period fantasy series Alchemy of Souls, and on October 29, she was confirmed as part of the main cast for the adaptation of Kang Full's webtoon Moving.

=== 2022–present: Breakthrough and transition to lead roles ===
When the film Hunt had its world premiere at the 2022 Cannes Film Festival in the Midnight Screenings section on May 19, 2022, Go officially made her cinema debut. The film was the feature directorial debut of Lee Jung-jae, who also starred in the film alongside Jung Woo-sung. Her performance as Joo Yoo-jeong garnered critical acclaim, leading to nominations for Best New Actress at the 31st Buil Film Awards, 58th Grand Bell Awards, 43rd Blue Dragon Film Awards, and 59th Baeksang Arts Awards.

In June 2022, Go made a cameo appearance as the skilled assassin Nak-su in Part 1 of the tvN fantasy period drama Alchemy of Souls, written by the Hong sisters. She returned in December as the female lead for Part 2, titled Alchemy of Souls: Light and Shadow. In this installment, she portrayed Jin Bu-yeon, an amnesiac priestess who enters into a marriage with Jang Uk (played by Lee Jae-wook).

In 2023, Go starred in two streaming series. Moving was broadcast on Disney+ from August 9 to September 20, 2023, where she played Jang Hui-soo, a character who inherits superpowers and possesses healing abilities and superhuman strength. For her role, Go received the Best New Actress Award at the 2023 Asia Contents Awards & Global OTT Awards and the 3rd Blue Dragon Series Awards. That same year, she made a special appearance in Death's Game which aired on TVING in December.

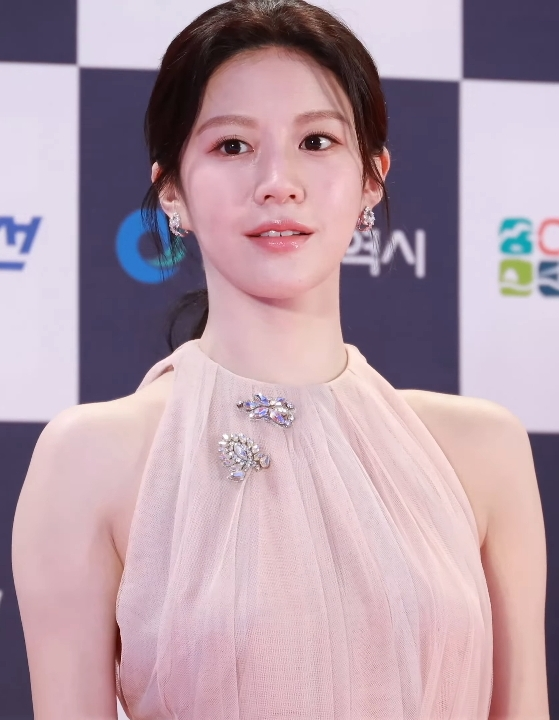
Go at the 3rd Blue Dragon Series Awards in 2024

In 2024, Go worked on two series. She completed filming for the tvN drama Resident Playbook, a spin-off of Hospital Playlist, where she was cast as Oh Yi-young, a first-year obstetrics and gynaecology resident at Jongno Yulje Hospital. While its release was initially set for April 2024, the drama faced a one-year broadcast postponement due to a nationwide medical strike. Following its eventual premiere on, April 12, 2025, Go received praise for her performance and character development. Her performance also led her to rank first on the Good Data Corporation's top 10 list of the most buzzworthy actors in TV-OTT drama for four consecutive weeks, from the third week of April to the second week of May 2025, which later earned her the Best Actress (Television) title at the institution's 2025 FUNdex Awards. She also received a nomination for the Excellence Award at the 2025 Korea Drama Awards. Following the drama's commercial success, Go joined the cast and crew on a reward vacation to Bali.

From June 2024 to February 2025, she filmed the Netflix series Can This Love Be Translated?, directed by Yoo Young-eun. The series marked her first lead role in the genre and reunited her with screenwriters the Hong sisters. She portrayed a dual role: Cha Mu-hee, a top actress, and Do Ra-mi, an alter ego who intermittently takes over Mu-hee's consciousness. The series, which centers on her romance with multilingual interpreter Joo Ho-jin (played by Kim Seon-ho), premiered on January 16, 2026.

In April 2025, it was announced that Go would star in the drama We Are All Trying Here, written by Park Hae-young. Directed by Cha Yeong-hoon, principal photography began in October 2025. It aired on JTBC from April 18, to May 24, 2026. In 2026, Go expanded her work into variety programming by joining the regular cast of The Secret Friends Club. She appeared in five episodes during the show's second part, beginning in February. In May, it was reported that Go was set to film season 2 of Disney+ Moving.

== Endorsements ==
In 2021, Go was named the ambassador for the French luxury jewelry house Boucheron. In November 2022, she became the brand muse for Marithé et François Girbaud. Go has been active as a promotional model for Usimsa since August 2026.

Her commercial work in 2023 included advertisements for Dior in February, followed by roles as an advertising model for the Philippine clothing brand Penshoppe, Carrot Insurance, outdoor clothing brand Discovery Expedition, and Ryo Hair. In 2024, Go signed endorsement contracts with the hair brand Vodana, chicken franchise Puradak Chicken and NH Nonghyup Bank. In April, she appeared in a commercial for the hangover relief drink Sangkwaehwan Booster Zero. In May, she attended Chanel's 2024/25 Cruise Collection show held in Marseille, France, marking her first Chanel show after being selected as a brand ambassador. In January 2025, she was chosen as the new muse for the jewelry brand Didier Dubot. In August 2026, she was announced as the new ambassador for the American luxury jewelry house Tiffany & Co..

== Public image ==
Since 2021, Go has been described by South Korean media using the sobriquets "face genius" and "MZ Troika".

== Filmography ==
=== Film ===
Key
| † | Denotes films that have not yet been released |

Feature film appearances
| Year | Title | Role | Ref. |
|---|---|---|---|
| 2022 | Hunt | Jo Yoo-jeong / Harada Hitomi | |
| TBA | Nambeol † | Ae-ryeong | |

=== Television series ===
Television series appearances
| Year | Title | Role | Notes | Ref. |
|---|---|---|---|---|
| 2019 | He Is Psychometric | Kim So-hyun | | |
| 2020 | The School Nurse Files | Choi Yoo-jin | Cameo | |
| 2020–2023 | Sweet Home | Park Yu-ri | Supporting role (season 1); Cameo (season 2) | |
| 2021 | Law School | Jeon Ye-seul | | |
| 2022 | Rookie Cops | Blind date's profile photo | Cameo (episode 4) | |
| 2022–2023 | Alchemy of Souls | Nak-su / Cho Yeong / Jin Bu-yeon | Cameo (part 1); Main role (part 2) | |
| 2023 | Moving | Jang Hui-soo | | |
| 2023–2024 | Death's Game | Lee Ji-su | Special appearance | |
| 2024 | Light Shop | Jang Hui-soo | Cameo (episode 8) | |
| 2025 | Resident Playbook | Oh Yi-young | | |
| 2026 | Can This Love Be Translated? | Cha Mu-hee / Do Ra-mi | | |
| 2026 | We Are All Trying Here | Byeon Eun-ah | | |

=== Television shows ===
Television shows appearances
| Year | Title | Role | Notes | Ref. |
|---|---|---|---|---|
| 2026 | The Secret Friends Club | Cast member | Member of 2nd Team (Episodes 4 to 9) | |

=== Music video appearances ===
Music video appearances
| Year | Song title | Artist | Notes | Ref. |
|---|---|---|---|---|
| 2018 | "Confession" | Yook Sung-jae | | |
| 2018 | "No.5" | Penomeco and Crush | | |
| 2019 | "However" | 10cm | | |
| 2020 | "I Will Give You All" | Lee Seung-chul | With Park Bo-gum | |

== Discography ==
=== Soundtrack appearances ===
List of soundtrack singles, showing year released and selected chart positions
| Title | Year | Peak chart positions | Notes |
| Title | Year | KOR | Notes |
|---|---|---|---|
| "A Race" (달리기) (with Shin Si-ah, Kang You-seok, Han Ye-ji) | 2025 | 96 | Resident Playbook OST |

== Accolades ==
=== Awards and nominations ===
Name of the award ceremony, year presented, category, nominee of the award, and the result of the nomination
| Award ceremony | Year | Category | Nominee / Work | Result | Ref. |
|---|---|---|---|---|---|
| APAN Star Awards | 2023 | Best New Actress | Alchemy of Souls & Moving | Nominated | |
| APAN Star Awards | 2025 | Excellence Award, Actress in a Miniseries | Resident Playbook | Nominated | |
| Asia Artist Awards | 2026 | Popularity Award – Actress | Go Youn-jung | Pending | |
| Asia Contents Awards & Global OTT Awards | 2023 | Best Newcomer Actress | Moving | Won | |
| Asia Star Entertainer Awards | 2026 | Best Character (Actress) | Can This Love Be Translated? | Won | |
| Asia Star Entertainer Awards | 2026 | Best OTT Artist | Can This Love Be Translated? | Won | |
| Asia Star Entertainer Awards | 2026 | Fan Choice Couple | Can This Love Be Translated? (Note: Go Youn-jung and Kim Seon-ho) | Nominated | |
| Baeksang Arts Awards | 2023 | Best New Actress – Film | Hunt | Nominated | |
| Baeksang Arts Awards | 2024 | Best New Actress – Television | Moving | Nominated | |
| Blue Dragon Film Awards | 2022 | Best New Actress | Hunt | Nominated | |
| Blue Dragon Series Awards | 2024 | Best New Actress | Moving | Won | |
| Blue Dragon Series Awards | 2026 | Popular Star Award | Can This Love Be Translated? | Won | |
| Blue Dragon Series Awards | 2026 | Best Actress | Can This Love Be Translated? | Nominated | |
| Blue Dragon Series Awards | 2026 | Global Icon | Can This Love Be Translated? | Won | |
| Brand Customer Loyalty Awards (Note: Brand Customer Loyalty Awards is annual event which selects and awards the most influential brands in society and popular culture, determined through national consumer surveys. It is organized by the Korea Consumer Forum and Brand Keys, a top 10 American brand consulting organization.) | 2023 | Rising Star Actress | Go Youn-jung | Won | |
| Brand Customer Loyalty Awards | 2024 | Actress – Hot Trend | Go Youn-jung | Won | |
| Brand Customer Loyalty Awards | 2026 | Actress – Hot Trend | Go Youn-jung | Won | |
| Brand of the Year Awards (Note: It is a large-scale brand award that selects and awards the best brands that shined in the year through direct consumer voting.) | 2024 | Advertising Model (Female) | Go Youn-jung | Won | |
| Brand of the Year Awards | 2025 | Best Actress (Indonesia) | Go Youn-jung | Won | |
| Brand of the Year Awards | 2026 | Actress (OTT) Category | Go Youn-jung | Won | |
| Buil Film Awards | 2022 | Best New Actress | Hunt | Nominated | |
| Cine21 Film Awards | 2023 | Best New Actress (Series) | Moving | Won | |
| Dong-A.com's Pick (Note: Award winners are selected by Dong-a Ilbo entertainment reporters.) | 2023 | Outstanding Face Genius Acting | Moving | Won | |
| Fundex Awards | 2025 | Best Actress of TV Drama | Resident Playbook | Won | |
| Fundex Awards | 2025 | Popular Star Prize – K-Drama Actress | Go Youn-jung | Nominated | |
| Grand Bell Awards | 2022 | Best New Actress | Hunt | Nominated | |
| Korea Drama Awards | 2025 | Excellence Award, Actress | Resident Playbook | Nominated | |
| Korea First Brand Awards (Note: Hosted by the Korea Consumer Brand Committee and the Korea Consumer Forum, the Korea First Brand Awards based its winners on a nationwide South Korean survey.) | 2024 | Rising Star Actress | Moving | Won | |
| Marie Claire Asia Star Awards | 2025 | Beyond Cinema Award | Go Youn-jung | Won | |
| Seoul International Drama Awards | 2026 | International Competition – Best Actress | Can This Love Be Translated? & We Are All Trying Here | Nominated | |
| Seoul International Drama Awards | 2026 | Outstanding Asian Star – South Korea | Can This Love Be Translated? | Nominated | |

=== State and cultural honors ===
Name of country, year given, and name of honor
| Country | Award ceremony | Year | Honor or award | Ref. |
|---|---|---|---|---|
| South Korea | Korean Popular Culture and Arts Awards (Note: Honors are given at the Korean Popular Culture and Arts Awards, arranged by the Korea Creative Content Agency and hosted by the Ministry of Culture, Sports and Tourism. They are awarded to those who have contributed to the arts and South Korea's pop culture.) | 2025 | Minister of Culture, Sports and Tourism Commendation | |

=== Listicles ===
Name of publisher, year listed, name of listicle, and placement
| Publisher | Year | Listicle | Placement | Ref. |
|---|---|---|---|---|
| Cine21 | 2023 | Top 5 New Actress to Watch in 2023 | 1st | |
| Cine21 | 2024 | Entertainment Trend-Actress to Watch | 1st (Note: Tied with IU) | |
| Cine21 | 2024 | Entertainment Trend-New Actress to Watch | 1st | |
| Cine21 | 2024 | Korean Film Next 50 – Actors | Included | |
| Cine21 | 2026 | Actress to Watch | 1st | |
| Forbes Korea | 2024 | Power Celebrity 40 | 36th | |
| Forbes Korea | 2026 | Power Celebrity 40 | 35th | |
| Gallup Korea | 2023 | Gallup Korea's Film Actor of the Year | 13th | |
| Sisa Journal (Note: The Sisa Journal is one of the major weekly news magazines in Korea. Established in 1989, its annually conducted 'Who Moves Korea' survey determines the most influential figures in the country and highlights next-generation leaders of Korea. The survey is conducted on a total of 1000 experts across 10 fields, including professors, journalists, politicians, businessmen, and cultural artists.) | 2023 | Next Generation Leaders | Included | |
| Star News (Note: Star News commissioned Gallup Korea for the survey.) | 2024 | Most Anticipated Next Generation Actor | 4th (Note: Tied for 4th place with 18% votes each with Byeon Woo-seok) | |
| Vogue Korea | 2021 | Notable Actress of 2021 | 4th | |
