= Bao Shangen =

Chinese actress (born 2002)

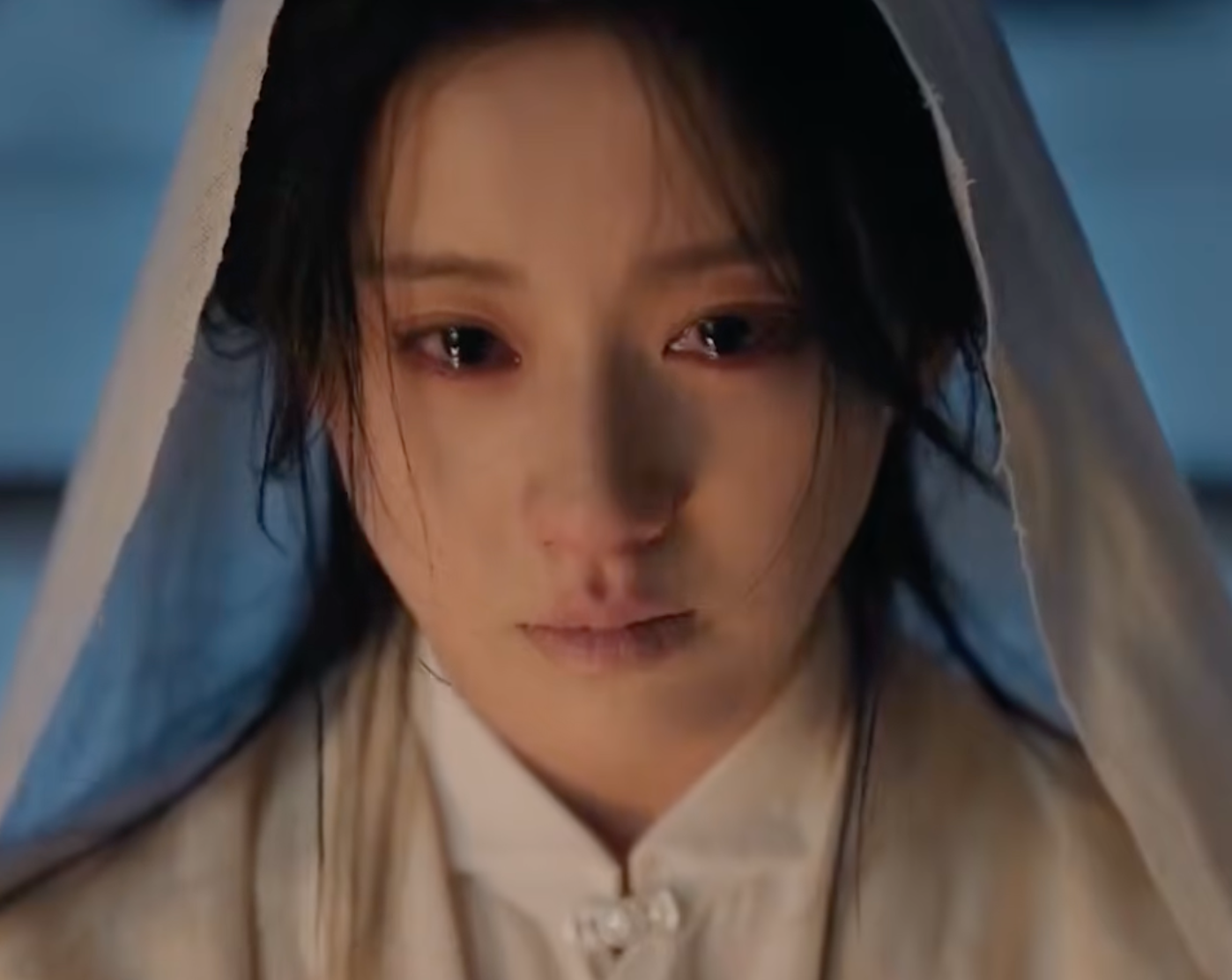
- Bao as Ren Yaoqi in the 2026 drama Reborn of the Rightful
- Born: Bao Lujia; May 23, 2002 (age 24); Shenzhen, Guangdong, China
- Other name: Ivy
- Education: Communication University of Zhejiang
- Occupation: Actress
- Years active: 2021–present

Chinese name
- Simplified Chinese: 包上恩
- Hanyu Pinyin: Bāo Shàngēn

Bao Lujia (Chinese: 包露佳, born May 23, 2002), professionally known as Bao Shangen (Chinese: 包上恩), is a Chinese actress. She is best known for her roles in the film Who's the Suspect (2023), and in the television series Love Behind the Melody (2022), Youthful Glory (2025), Generation to Generation (2026), and Never Ending Summer (2026).

== Public image ==
Before entering the entertainment industry, Bao was already popular during 9th grade and trended in high school for being "too pretty". She is also known for her subtle and angelic physical appearance, having soft appeal and divine femininity.

== Endorsements ==
Bao spearheaded high-fashion billboards and luxury campaigns, participating for Valentino Beauty and Tom Ford Beauty.

== Filmography ==
=== Film ===
Year	Title	Role	Notes	Ref.
2023	Who's the Suspect	Liang Xinyuan		
2024	Reversed Destiny	Mi Sha		

=== Television series ===
Year	Title	Role	Notes	Ref.
2022	Love Behind the Melody	Li Sasa		
2022	Be Yourself	Chi Xiaoyu		
2022	My Deepest Dream	Ren Jie		
2023	Wonderful Hand	Leng Yuehan		
2023	Fake It Till You Make It	Lin Xinzi		
2024	The Legend of Heroes	Huang Rong		
2025	Youthful Glory	Ming Tan		
2025	To Get Master	Li Song'er		
2025	Whispers of Fate	Zhong Chunji		
2026	Generation to Generation	Cai Zhao		
2026	Never Ending Summer	Zhou Wan		
TBA	Hero Legends	Princess Yinchuan		
TBA	In the Moonlight	Li Yaoying		
TBA	Reborn of the Rightful	Ren Yaoqi		

=== Television shows ===
Year	Title	Role	Notes	Ref.
2021	Ace Actress	Contestant		
2021	Dunk of China Season 4	Team Leader		

=== Hosting ===
Year	Title	Role	Notes	Ref.
2023	2023 Asia Contents Awards & Global OTT Awards	Host	with Jin Dong	

== Awards and nominations ==
Year	Award	Category	Nominee(s)/Work(s)	Result	Ref.
2022	Asia Contents Awards & Global OTT Awards	Best Newcomer Actress	Bao Shangen	Won	
