= Imperfect Us =

Taiwanese television series

Chinese name
- Traditional Chinese: 不夠善良的我們
Transcriptions
Standard Mandarin
- Hanyu Pinyin: Búgòu shànliáng de wǒmen
- Genre: Drama; Romance
- Directed by: Mag Hsu
- Starring: Ariel Lin; Tiffany Hsu; Mike He; Kai Ko
- Opening theme: Tanya Chua
- Country of origin: Taiwan
- Original language: Mandarin
- No. of seasons: 1
- No. of episodes: 8

Original release
- Network: Gala TV and PTS
- Release: April 6 – April 27, 2024

Imperfect Us (Chinese: 不夠善良的我們; pinyin: Búgòu shànliáng de wǒmen) is a 2024 original Taiwanese television series directed by Mag Hsu. The series stars Ariel Lin, Tiffany Hsu, Mike He, and Kai Ko. The series was released on April 6, 2024.

== Synopsis ==
Chien Ching-fen is trapped in 12 years of marriage and child rearing which makes her the envy of many single women. Chien Ching-fen is an office worker who has no ambition to work. She was originally He Rui-zhi's subordinate. Since joining the company, it has been discovered that Chien and Rebecca Chang were not only born on the same day and month, but also often wear matching outfits.

Unexpectedly, Chien and Rebecca also fell in love with He Rui-zhi at the same time. Twelve years later, Chien Ching-fen became He Rui-zhi's wife and began a happy but boring family life. Chien becomes curious about Rebecca's current condition and becomes jealous when she finds out that she has a good life. But in reality, there is a big gap between the side of Rebecca shown on social media and real life.

== Cast ==
=== Main starring ===
Actor/Actress	Role	Introduction
Ariel Lin	Chien Ching-fen	Wife of He Rui-zhi
Tiffany Hsu	Rebecca (Chang Yi-jing)	Ex-girlfriend of He Rui-zhi
Mike He	He Rui-zhi	Husband of Chien Ching-fen
Kai Ko	Yu Xiang-li	
Lu Yi-ching	He Wei Shui-mei	Mother of He Rui-zhi
Johnny Lu	Mr. Lin	General Manager of Ao Senqing
Lawrence Ko	Chang Zhi-hao	Elder brother of Rebecca

== Accolades ==
=== Awards and nominations ===
The TV series was nominated for five categories and received two Awards.

Award ceremony	Year	Category	Recipient	Result	Ref.
Asia Contents Awards & Global OTT Awards	2024	Best Asian TV Series	Imperfect Us	Nominated	
Asia Contents Awards & Global OTT Awards	2024	Best Lead Actress	Ariel Lin	Won	
Asia Contents Awards & Global OTT Awards	2024	Best Original Song	"Learn to Live Again" by Tanya Chua	Won	
Asia Contents Awards & Global OTT Awards	2024	Best Supporting Actor	Kai Ko	Nominated	
Asia Contents Awards & Global OTT Awards	2024	Best Writer	Mag Hsu	Nominated	
