= Moving (South Korean TV series) =

2023 South Korean television series

- Hangul: 무빙
- RR: Mubing
- MR: Mubing
- Genre: Action; Fantasy; Thriller; Sci-fi; Romance; Family drama
- Based on: Moving by Kang Full
- Written by: Kang Full
- Directed by: Park In-je; Park Yoon-seo
- Starring: Ryu Seung-ryong; Han Hyo-joo; Zo In-sung; Cha Tae-hyun; Park Hee-soon; Kim Sung-kyun; Lee Jung-ha; Go Youn-jung; Kim Do-hoon
- Music by: Dalpalan
- Country of origin: South Korea
- Original language: Korean
- No. of episodes: 20

Production
- Executive producer: Hamm Jin
- Producers: Park Kyung-seo; Kim Jong-min; Heo Woong
- Editor: Kim Chang-ju
- Camera setup: Multi-camera
- Production companies: Studio&NEW; Mr. Romance
- Budget: ₩50–65 billion

Original release
- Network: Disney+
- Release: August 9, 2023 – present

Moving (Korean: 무빙) is a 2023 South Korean action fantasy sci-fi television series written by Kang Full, and co-directed by Park In-je and Park Yoon-seo. The series stars an ensemble cast including Ryu Seung-ryong, Han Hyo-joo, Zo In-sung, Cha Tae-hyun, Ryoo Seung-bum, Kim Sung-kyun, Lee Jung-ha, Go Youn-jung, and Kim Do-hoon. Based on the eponymous Kakao webtoon by Kang, the series is a supernatural drama that depicts the familial story of three teenage high school students and their parents who discover their super powers. The first season was released from August 9 to September 20, 2023. After seven days of availability, it became the most watched Korean original series on Disney+ globally and Hulu in the United States, based on hours streamed. In November 2024, it was announced that production of a second season had begun, with an aim to release sometime in 2026.

Moving won 6 awards at the 2023 Asia Contents Awards & Global OTT Awards including Best Creative, Best Lead Actor, Best Writer, Best Newcomer Actor and Actress, and Best Visual Effects awards. The series also won the Baeksang Arts Award Grand Prize – Television at the 60th Baeksang Arts Awards. Moving also received the top honor (Grand Prize) at the Blue Dragon Series Awards, and Best Actor and Best Actress nominations for its leads Ryu Seung-ryong and Han Hyo-joo, respectively.

The major success of the series is said to have revitalized the streaming service Disney+, which was struggling to gain a foothold in Korea. It also launched the careers of up-and-coming young actors Lee Jung-ha, Go Youn-jung, and Kim Do-hoon.

== Cast ==
=== Main ===
- Ryu Seung-ryong as Jang Ju-won

Hui-soo's father who opens a fried chicken shop. He possesses superhuman strength and regeneration abilities. He is a former top mob enforcer turned former Agency for National Security Planning (ANSP) black-ops agent with the code name Guryongpo, and Doo-sik's partner during his time in the ANSP.

- Han Hyo-joo as Lee Mi-hyun

Doo-sik's wife and Bong-seok's mother, who opens a tonkatsu restaurant, whose five senses—sight, hearing, smell, taste, and reflexes—are enhanced to a superhuman level. She is a former ANSP intelligence analyst and the youngest-ever graduate in the history of the National Intelligence Service (NIS).

- Zo In-sung as Kim Doo-sik

Mi-hyun's husband and Bong-seok's father. He is a former ANSP black-ops agent who operated under the code name Moonsan and possesses flying abilities. After a secret mission to assassinate Kim Il Sung, he is apprehended by the NIS.

- Cha Tae-hyun as Jeon Gye-do

- Kim Joon as young Jeon Gye-do
A theater actor-turned-bus driver who has the ability to generate electricity.

- Ryoo Seung-bum as Frank

- Kim Tae-yul as young Frank
An orphan with healing abilities who becomes an American-raised assassin. He pursues the retired agents under the orders of the CIA.

- Kim Sung-kyun as Lee Jae-man

Gang-hoon's father, who opens a mini mart. He possesses superhuman strength and speed, but is cognitively impaired.

- Lee Jung-ha (Season 1) and Won Gyu-bin (Season 2) as Kim Bong-seok

- Han Chang-min as young Kim Bong-seok
Mi-hyun and Doo-sik's son, and a student of Class 3–3 at Jeongwon High School, who possesses the same abilities as both his parents.

- Go Youn-jung as Jang Hui-soo

- Park Soo-ah as young Jang Hui-soo
Ju-won's daughter, and a student of Class 3–3 at Jeongwon High School. She has healing abilities, which she inherited from her father.

- Kim Do-hoon as Lee Gang-hoon

- Kim Si-woo as young Lee Gang-hoon
Jae-man's son, and the class leader of Class 3–3 at Jeongwon High School. He has superhuman strength and speed, which he inherited from his father.

=== Supporting ===
==== Jeongwon High School ====
- Kim Hee-won as Choi Il-hwan

A former Special Forces 3rd Brigade member turned PE teacher, under the orders of the NIS, who teaches the superhuman children.

- Yoo Seung-mok as Jo Rae-hyuk

The principal of Jeongwon High School. He is actually a NIS black ops agent, and under the orders of Yong-jun, he searches for agents with superpowers and gathers any students with powers.

- Shin Jae-hwi as Bang Ki-soo

A delinquent student of Class 3–3 at Jeongwon High School. He has conflicts with Gang-hoon and is aware of the existence of the superhumans.

- Shim Dal-gi as Shin Hye-won

A transfer student at Jeongwon High School. She is also Hui-soo's classmate at their former school Jangkyung High School.

- Kim Jong-soo as Hwang Ji-sung

A former NIS agent turned security guard at Jeongwon High School.

- Jeon Seok-ho as Yoon Sung-wook

A NIS agent who becomes a part-time PE teacher of Jeongwon High School.

- Park Han-sol as Han Byul

A student of Class 3–3 at Jeongwon High School. She is a vlogger who loves to capture everything that happens in school with her camera. She has a crush on Gang-hoon. Her personality is bubbly and happy, yet very scared in scary situations.

- Yoon Sa-bong as a cleaner

A North Korean agent who disguises herself as a cleaner at Jeongwon High School.

==== National Intelligence Service ====
- Moon Sung-keun as Min Yong-jun

The fifth director of the NIS. He observes and gives orders to the agents with superpowers.

- Kim Shin-rok as Yeo Woon-gyu

Formerly Mi-hyun's superior, she now works with Yong-jun to observe the agents with superpowers. She plans and controls everything well for the success of the missions.

- Baek Hyun-jin as Jung Sang-jin

A retired agent with the code name Jincheon. He has superhuman strength.

- Choi Deok-moon as Jeon Yeong-seok

A retired agent with the code name Bongpyeong, and Gye-do's father. He has the ability to generate electricity.

- Kim Gook-hee as Hong Seong-hwa

A retired agent with the code name Naju. She has the ability to see through everything.

- Kwon Han-sol as Ms. Kim

A loyal secretary to Yong-jun.

- Park Byung-eun as Ma Sang-gu

A ruthless and sadistic NIS black ops agent.

==== People around Jang Ju-won ====
- Kwak Sun-young as Hwang Ji-hee

Ju-won's wife and Hui-soo's mother, who died from a car accident when Hui-soo was young.

- Moon Jung-dae as Kim Gwang-jin

Ju-won's boss.

- Lim Seong-jae as Bae Min-gi

Ju-won's subordinate.

- Park Sung-il as Jeon Jae-sung

The leader of the Ulsan gang.

- Baek Joo-hee as motel owner

==== People around Lee Jae-man ====
- Park Bo-kyung as Shin Yoon-young

Jae-man's wife and Gang-hoon's mother.

- Lee Hae-young as chief officer
- Oh Hee-joon as Song Gi-yul

==== North Korean agents ====
- Park Hee-soon as Kim Deok-yun

A North Korean military officer who risked everything to follow orders and complete his mission.

- Jo Bok-rae as Park Chan-il

A North Korean agent with speed and monstrous strength.

- Yang Dong-geun as Jung Joon-hwa

A North Korean soldier with flying skills.

- Kim Da-hyun as Bae Jae-hak

A North Korean soldier with faster-than-human reactions and excellent shooting skills.

- Park Kwang-jae as Kwon Yong-deuk

A North Korean soldier with recovery ability and superhuman strength.

- Kim Joong-hee as Lim Jae-seok

A North Korean deserter who can destroy the surrounding area with waves created by the friction of his palms.

==== Season 2 ====
- Sul Kyung-gu
- Lee Hee-joon
- Ryu Hye-young
- Roh Yoon-seo
- Kim Sung-kyu
- Kim Gun-woo
- Choi Yoon-ji
- Chae Won-bin

=== Special appearances ===
- Son Byong-ho as Kim Hyun-sung

The minister of MSS.

- Lee Ho-jung as Yang Se-eun

Seong-hwa's daughter. She has the ability to see through everything, which she inherited from her parents.

- Son Bo-seung as the handicapped son of a butcher
- as Kim Young-tak

A student at Jeongwon High School. He is found ineligible and transfers to another high school. He is originally one of the characters in Kang Full's past comic, Timing.

- Song Duk-ho as Seo Yu-ra's boyfriend

Jang Kyeong-go's bully.

== Episodes ==
All episodes were written by Kang Full, and directed by Park In-je and Park Yoon-seo.

No.	Title	Original release date
1	"Senior Year"; Transliteration: "Go3" (Korean: 고3)	August 9, 2023
Kim Bong-seok looks like an ordinary high school student, but hides a secret. Jang Hui-soo, who excited Bong-seok on the bus, transfers to the same class.
2	"Booyang: Family Support, Levitation"; Transliteration: "Buyang" (Korean: 부양)	August 9, 2023
Lee Mi-hyun hides Bong-seok's superpowers, but the mysterious incidents on social media make her anxious.
3	"1+1"; Transliteration: "Won+Won" (Korean: 원+원)	August 9, 2023
The closer Bong-seok grows to Hui-soo, the more risk of exposure he draws.
4	"The Secret"; Transliteration: "Bimil" (Korean: 비밀)	August 9, 2023
Bong-seok's secret is exposed, and Hui-soo walks him home; Frank searches for his third target.
5	"Recall"; Transliteration: "Rikol" (Korean: 리콜)	August 9, 2023
Hui-soo assures Bong-seok that his secret is safe by revealing her own secret.
6	"Bungaeman"; Transliteration: "Beongaemaen" (Korean: 번개맨)	August 9, 2023
Jeon Gye-do's past is revealed; the NIS finds out information about Frank.
7	"The Stranger"; Transliteration: "Ibang-in" (Korean: 이방인)	August 9, 2023
Frank recalls his past as he eliminates his targets; after Frank's visit, Mi-hyun suppresses her son.
8	"Black"; Transliteration: "Beullaek" (Korean: 블랙)	August 16, 2023
In 1994, Intelligence analyst Mi-hyun deliberately approaches Kim Doo-sik, a black agent, under the direction of Deputy Director Min Yong-jun.
9	"Humanists"; Transliteration: "Hyumeoniseuteu" (Korean: 휴머니스트)	August 16, 2023
Doo-sik and Mi-hyun grow closer as they share secrets. Doo-sik tricks Director Min and proposes to continue the operation.
10	"The Monster"; Transliteration: "Goemul" (Korean: 괴물)	August 23, 2023
In 1990, Jang Ju-won, who led the organization with monstrous abilities, was betrayed and became a fugitive. Hwang Ji-hee appears in front of the lost Ju-won.
11	"Romanticist"; Transliteration: "Romaentiseuteu" (Korean: 로맨티스트)	August 23, 2023
While talking with Ju-won, Ji-hee gradually opens her heart. One day, returning to the motel, Ju-won hears Ji-hee screaming.
12	"Partners"; Transliteration: "Pateuneo" (Korean: 파트너)	August 30, 2023
In 1994, Doo-sik who had disappeared, visits Mi-hyun, with a plan to escape from Director Min forever.
13	"Jang Ju-won"; Transliteration: "Jang Juwon" (Korean: 장주원)	August 30, 2023
After the dissolution of the Black Team, Ju-won is transferred to an office job. One day, Director Min appears and proposes a mission to rebuild the Black Team with Ju-won as Team Leader. After one of his missions overseas, Ju-won finds out that his wife and daughter were involved in a car accident.
14	"The Fool"; Transliteration: "Babo" (Korean: 바보)	September 6, 2023
Lee Jae-man's past is revealed. In 2003, when Lee Jae-man's wife is arrested for participating in a protest, he tries to save her with his power.
15	"N.T.D.P"	September 6, 2023
Jeongwon High School's secrets are starting to get revealed. After seeing the video of the auditorium accident, Mi-hyun and Ju-won become suspicious and come to Jeongwon High School. Gye-do discovers Joon-hwa following Bong-seok and Hui-soo.
16	"The Man Between"; Transliteration: "Gyeonggyeingan" (Korean: 경계인간)	September 13, 2023
Choi Il-hwan's story from a Special Forces soldier to a teacher of Jeongwon High School is revealed.
17	"Awakening"; Transliteration: "Gakseong" (Korean: 각성)	September 13, 2023
The North Korean agents begin their mission to look for the files in Jeongwon High School, with Ju-won and Mi-hyun standing in their way.
18	"South and North"; Transliteration: "Namgwa buk" (Korean: 남과 북)	September 20, 2023
The stories behind the North Korean agents' abilities is revealed, as the South Korean superhumans and North Korean agents continue the battle.
19	"Final Battle"; Transliteration: "Gyeoljeon" (Korean: 결전)	September 20, 2023
The final battle in Jeongwon High School between the South and North continues, with new allies from both sides joining the battle.
20	"Graduation Day"; Transliteration: "Joreopsik" (Korean: 졸업식)	September 20, 2023
The battle in Jeongwon High School concludes.

== Production ==
=== Season 1 ===
South Korean webtoon artist Kang Full rose to popularity in 2003 with his romance webtoon Love Story. Kang then explored other genres, including the superhero genre with Timing (2005) and Moving (2015). On January 6, 2020, it was announced that Studio & New would produce a television series based on Moving. It is the first screen adaptation of Kang Full's webtoons to be scripted by the author himself. On September 9, 2020, it was revealed that Zo In-sung had received an offer to appear in the series. In August 2021, it was reported that the series was being produced by Studio & New. Due to its extensive use of special effects, Moving had a high production budget, ranging between ₩50–65 billion. (Note: Some news outlets reported that the production had a budget of ₩65 billion (US$48.5 million), while others reported that they had a budget of ₩50 billion (US$37.31 million).) The series includes over 7,000 CGI shots. On October 13, 2021, Disney+ announced Moving as their tentpole show for the pan-Asian market. In February 2021, it was reported that the joint production agreement had been cancelled and Park In-je would replace director Mo Wan-il due to differences between co-producers JTBC and Next Entertainment World.

On October 29, 2021, the lineup of the lead stars was revealed by releasing photos of the cast reading the script. After completing the casting of the series on August 23, 2021,filming began on August 26. By January 2022, about half of filming had been completed. The production staff members were divided into two teams; the second team was led by director Park Yoon-seo.

=== Season 2 ===
According to Osen in November 2024, Kang Full had already begun working on the script for the second season, and several stars had been informed. However, filming was expected to debut three years after the first season, given the large scope of the project. Pre-production was reported to be underway by that time, with a target release date for the second season sometime in 2026. During a press conference held in Singapore on November 21, 2024, the Walt Disney Company Asia Pacific announced that the second season had begun development.

== Original soundtrack ==
Moving (Original Soundtrack)

Soundtrack album by Dalpalan
- Released: January 19, 2024
- Length: 180:37
- Language: Korean
- Labels: Music&NEW Co. Ltd.

Singles from Moving
- 1. "Where Are You Darling v3" Released: January 19, 2024

The show's soundtrack album was released on January 19, 2024.

Disc 1
No.	Title	Music	Length
1.	"Sky"	Dalpalan	1:12
2.	"Pounding Heart 3"	Dalpalan	0:47
3.	"Bookstore Fight"	Dalpalan	4:42
4.	"School Playground"	Dalpalan	1:50
5.	"Pounding Heart v2"	Dalpalan	1:55
6.	"Where Are You Darling v3"	Dalpalan	2:17
7.	"Rising Bongseok"	Dalpalan	3:16
8.	"Rainy Night"	Dalpalan	3:16
9.	"Your Back v2"	Dalpalan	1:55
10.	"Feeling of Flying"	Dalpalan	2:38
11.	"Girlfriend"	Dalpalan	4:54
12.	"My Wings v4"	Dalpalan	3:48
13.	"My Father and Mother"	Dalpalan	3:46
14.	"Coffee Operation"	Dalpalan	1:43
15.	"Lovely Night"	Dalpalan	3:41
16.	"To Love"	Dalpalan	2:30
17.	"Where Are You Darling v4"	Dalpalan	3:43
18.	"Betrayal"	Dalpalan	11:37
19.	"Scooter Love"	Dalpalan	5:30
20.	"Russian Operation"	Dalpalan	7:09
21.	"Partner"	Dalpalan	2:18
22.	"It Was an Operation"	Dalpalan	4:22
23.	"Whose Betrayal"	Dalpalan	6:45
Total length:			1:27:19

Disc 2
No.	Title	Music	Length
1.	"My Wings 2"	Dalpalan	3:15
2.	"Happy Imagination"	Dalpalan	4:27
3.	"In The Mountains"	Dalpalan	14:37
4.	"Ice Candy"	Dalpalan	2:07
5.	"Conditions of Work"	Dalpalan	14:02
6.	"Various Tests"	Dalpalan	1:52
7.	"School Search"	Dalpalan	6:16
8.	"Restless Movement v2"	Dalpalan	6:50
9.	"Single Wooden Bridge v2"	Dalpalan	3:41
10.	"Save The Children"	Dalpalan	2:18
11.	"Top Secret Mission v2"	Dalpalan	5:55
12.	"End of Deep Cliff v2"	Dalpalan	6:21
13.	"Run Away Once v3"	Dalpalan	7:23
14.	"Dangerous School War"	Dalpalan	8:25
15.	"The Cause of the Fight v2"	Dalpalan	7:37
16.	"Decisive Battle"	Dalpalan	7:13
17.	"Sky of Crisis v2"	Dalpalan	7:44
18.	"Lightning Man Again v2"	Dalpalan	6:04
19.	"End of Deep Cliff v3"	Dalpalan	0:50
20.	"My Memories"	Dalpalan	4:06
21.	"All Operations"	Dalpalan	2:58
22.	"Your Wings 2"	Dalpalan	4:11
23.	"Wait and Go v2"	Dalpalan	2:08
Total length:			2:10:20

== Release ==
Moving, after facing delays in production, premiered on Disney+ on August 9, 2023. It was made available in 65 markets and countries through the platform and in the United States through Hulu. The first seven episodes were released on August 9, followed by two episodes per week, and the final three episodes on September 20.

The drama was aired for the first time on linear television via MBC on December 22, 2024.

== Reception ==
=== Critical response ===
On the review aggregator Rotten Tomatoes website, the series has an approval rating of 100% based on 9 reviews, with an average rating of 8.4/10.

Pierce Conran of South China Morning Post rated the series five out of five and wrote, "In adapting his own webcomic for the screen, Kang Full has stitched together a rich canvas combining a multitude of characters who weave in and out of his story, each of them fleshed out and given their moment to shine."

=== Viewership ===
After seven days of availability, Moving became the most watched Korean Disney+ original series on the platform globally and on Hulu in the United States, based on hours streamed. In its first week of release, Moving became the most watched series in numerous countries in the Asia-Pacific (APAC) region, including South Korea, Japan, Hong Kong, Taiwan, and countries in Southeast Asia, based on hours watched. The series also had the biggest premiere ever on Disney+ in South Korea, based on hours watched in its first week of availability. The executive vice president of original content strategy of the Walt Disney Company (APAC), Carol Choi, said the response "exceeded our expectations". Variety called the series "the next breakout hit from Asia after Squid Game".

After Moving's premiere, the use time of Disney+ in South Korea increased by 145%, reaching an all-time high of 196 million minutes in the series' fifth week of availability.

On December 15, 2023, the Walt Disney Company Korea announced that Moving had become the most-watched local original series of the year on Disney+ in South Korea.

== Accolades ==
Moving, with six nominations, was the most nominated series at the 2023 Asia Contents Awards & Global OTT Awards. All six nominations led to wins at the award show on October 8, 2023.

Award	Year	Category	Nominee(s) / work(s)	Result	Ref.
APAN Star Awards	2023	Drama of the Year	Moving	Nominated	
APAN Star Awards	2023	Best Director	Park In-je	Won	
APAN Star Awards	2023	Best Screenwriter	Kang Full	Nominated	
APAN Star Awards	2023	Top Excellence Award, Actor in a Miniseries	Ryu Seung-ryong	Won	
APAN Star Awards	2023	Best New Actor	Lee Jung-ha	Nominated	
APAN Star Awards	2023	Best New Actress	Go Youn-jung	Nominated	
Asia Contents Awards & Global OTT Awards	2023	Best Creative	Moving	Won	
Asia Contents Awards & Global OTT Awards	2023	Best Lead Actor	Ryu Seung-ryong	Won	
Asia Contents Awards & Global OTT Awards	2023	Best Newcomer Actor	Lee Jung-ha	Won	
Asia Contents Awards & Global OTT Awards	2023	Best Newcomer Actress	Go Youn-jung	Won	
Asia Contents Awards & Global OTT Awards	2023	Best Visual Effects	Moving	Won	
Asia Contents Awards & Global OTT Awards	2023	Best Writer	Kang Full	Won	
Baeksang Arts Awards	2024	Grand Prize – Television	Moving	Won	
Baeksang Arts Awards	2024	Best Drama	Moving	Nominated	
Baeksang Arts Awards	2024	Best Director	Park In-je	Nominated	
Baeksang Arts Awards	2024	Best Screenplay	Kang Full	Won	
Baeksang Arts Awards	2024	Best Actor	Ryu Seung-ryong	Nominated	
Baeksang Arts Awards	2024	Best New Actor	Lee Jung-ha	Won	
Baeksang Arts Awards	2024	Best New Actress	Go Youn-jung	Nominated	
Baeksang Arts Awards	2024	Technical Award	Lee Seong-gyu (VFX)	Nominated	
Blue Dragon Series Awards	2024	Blue Dragon's Choice (Grand Prize)	Moving	Won	
Blue Dragon Series Awards	2024	Best Drama	Moving	Nominated	
Blue Dragon Series Awards	2024	Best Actor	Ryu Seung-ryong	Nominated	
Blue Dragon Series Awards	2024	Best Actress	Han Hyo-joo	Nominated	
Blue Dragon Series Awards	2024	Best Supporting Actor	Kim Sung-kyun	Nominated	
Blue Dragon Series Awards	2024	Best Supporting Actress	Kwak Sun-young	Nominated	
Blue Dragon Series Awards	2024	Best New Actor	Lee Jung-ha	Won	
Blue Dragon Series Awards	2024	Best New Actress	Go Youn-jung	Won	
CJ ENM Visionary Awards (Note: Visionary Awards, which started in 2020, selects and awards people who lead roles in the Korean entertainment industry. It highlights the meaning and achievements of a person whose chosen trend keywords penetrated the entertainment industry, including broadcasting, movies, music, and performances, and presents the next vision of the cultural sector with outstanding achievements and influence.)	2024	2024 Visionary	Ryu Seung-ryong	Won	
CJ ENM Visionary Awards	2024	2024 Visionary	Kang Full	Won	
Critics' Choice Awards	2024	Best Foreign Language Series	Moving	Nominated	
Consumer Rights Day KCA Culture and Entertainment Awards	2023	Best Screenplay	Kang Full	Won	
FUNdex Awards	2023	FUNdex Grand Prize of drama	Moving	Won	
FUNdex Awards	2023	Best Drama of Clips	Moving	Nominated	
FUNdex Awards	2023	Best Of VON(Voice of Netizen)	Moving	Nominated	
FUNdex Awards	2023	Best of OTT Drama Actor	Ryu Seung-ryong	Nominated	
FUNdex Awards	2023	Best of OTT Drama Actor	Zo In-sung	Nominated	
FUNdex Awards	2023	Best of OTT Drama Actor	Lee Jung-ha	Nominated	
FUNdex Awards	2023	Best of OTT Drama Actress	Han Hyo-joo	Nominated	
FUNdex Awards	2023	Best of OTT Drama Actress	Go Youn-jung	Nominated	
FUNdex Awards	2023	Best of OTT Drama Supporting Actor	Kim Hee-won	Nominated	
Grand Bell Awards	2023	Best Series	Moving	Won	
Grand Bell Awards	2023	Best Series Director	Park In-je and Park Yoon-seo	Nominated	
Grand Bell Awards	2023	Best Series Actor	Ryu Seung-ryong	Nominated	
Grand Bell Awards	2023	Best Series Actress	Han Hyo-joo	Won	
Seoul International Drama Awards	2024	Best Miniseries	Moving	Nominated	
Seoul International Drama Awards	2024	Best Director	Park In-je	Won	
Seoul International Drama Awards	2024	Best Screenwriter	Kang Full	Nominated	
Seoul International Drama Awards	2024	Outstanding Korean Drama	Moving	Won	
