= 2023 Asia Contents Awards & Global OTT Awards =

2023 Asia Contents Awards

- Official poster
- Awarded for: The achievements of excellent content made for TV, OTT, and online across Asia
- Date: October 8, 2023
- Venue: BIFF Theater, Busan Cinema Center, Busan
- Country: South Korea
- Presented by: Ministry of Science and ICT; Busan Metropolitan City
- Hosted by: Kim Kang-woo; Nancy

Highlights
- Most wins: Moving (6)
- Most nominations: Moving (6)
- Website: ACA & Global OTT Awards

Television/radio coverage
- Network: YouTube; U+ Mobile TV

The 2023 Asia Contents Awards & Global OTT Awards (Korean: 2023 아시아콘텐츠어워즈&글로벌OTT어워즈), presented by Ministry of Science and ICT and Busan Metropolitan City, took place on October 8, 2023, at BIFF Theater, Busan Cinema Center, Busan, South Korea. The awards ceremony was organized by Busan International Film Festival and Korea Radio Promotion Association, as an event of the 2023 edition of the festival. The Awards ceremony hosted by Kim Kang-woo and Nancy was broadcast live on official YouTube channel and LG U+ u+ Mobile TV channel.

== Background ==
Asia Contents Awards was an annual event. From 2023, it joined hands with the International OTT Festival, and co-host, the Ministry of Science and ICT and Busan Metropolitan City. Rebranding itself as "Asia Contents Awards & Global OTT Awards (ACA & G.OTT Awards)", it has expanded its horizon from Asia to the world. It now has 17 award categories including 5 newly added awards. The Awards celebrates 10 awards in competition and 7 awards by invitation such as Lifetime Achievement Award and Rising Star of the Year and also recognising contribution of the streamers, presents awards to the OTT service providers.

=== Awards ceremony ===
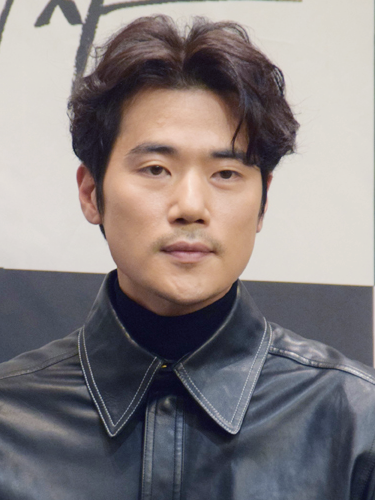
Kim Kang-woo, South Korean actor

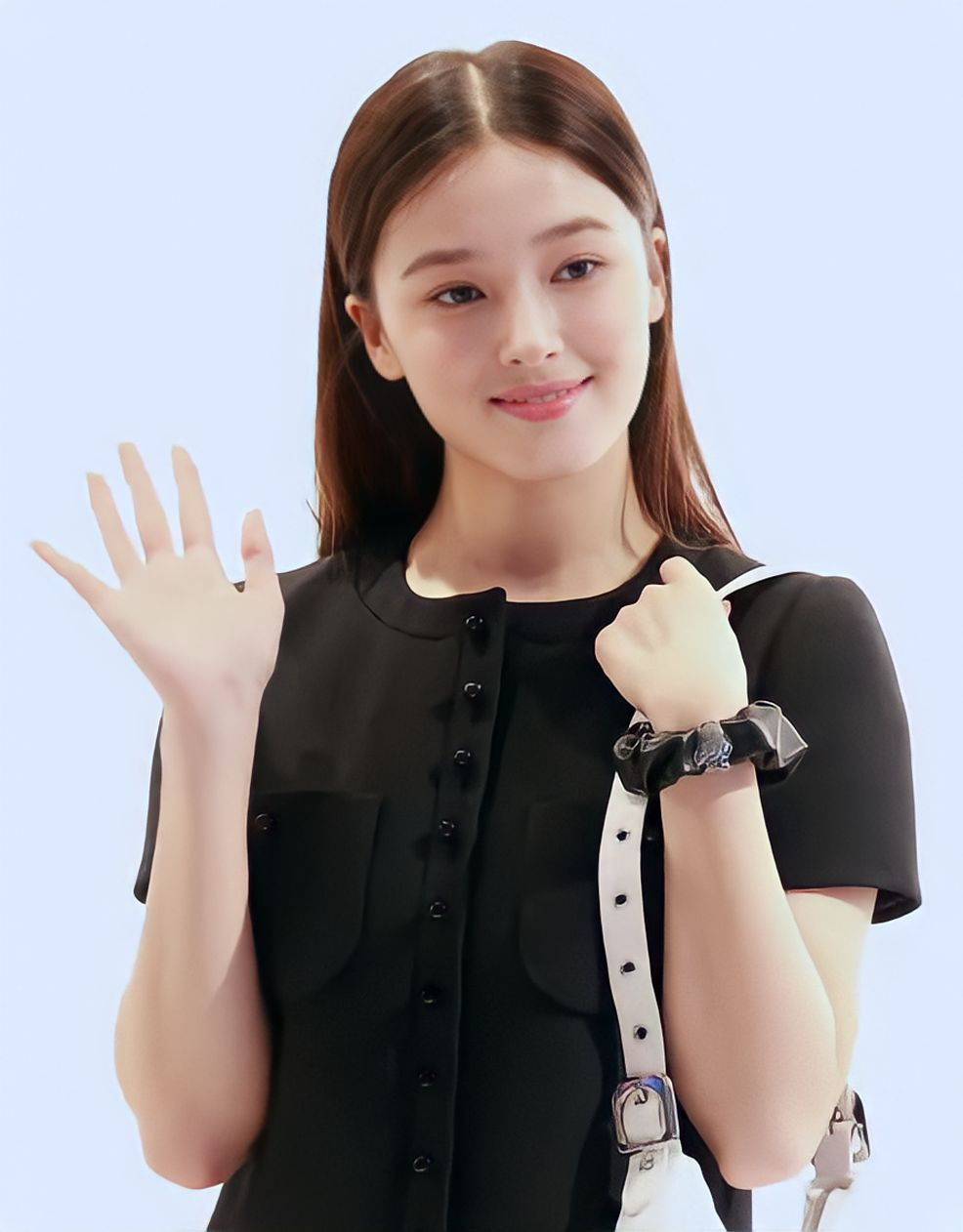
Momoland's Nancy

MCs of the ceremony

The Awards ceremony was hosted by actor Kim Kang-woo and Momoland's Nancy. It included a celebratory performance by idol girl group ALICE and South Korean singer Lee Seung-yoon. Chinese actor Jin Dong and actress Bao Shangen were presenters of the awards in ceremony along with the South Korean stars. The ceremony was streamed live on the Busan International Film Festival's official YouTube channel and LG U+ u+ Mobile TV channel.

The award show was attended by stars from Asia. Moving, a South Korean series by Park In-je won six awards at the ceremony viz.: Best Creative, Best Lead Actor, Best Writer, Best Newcomer Actor and Actress, and Best Visual Effects awards. Scoop, an Indian series by Hansal Mehta won Best Asian TV Series and Best Lead Actress awards.

== Awards and nominations ==
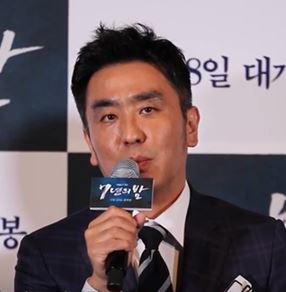
Ryu Seung-ryong, winner of Best Lead Actor Award for Moving

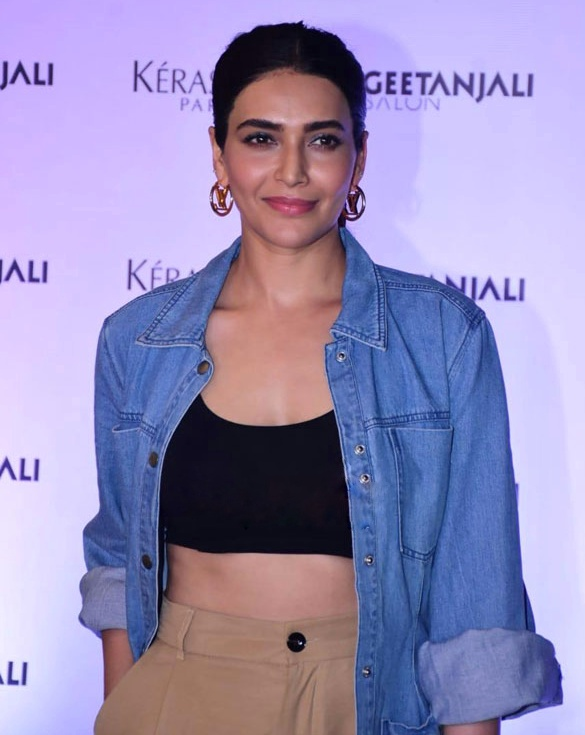
Karishma Tanna, winner of Best Lead Actress Award for Scoop

Nominees and winners (winners denoted in bold):

=== Open competition ===
Best Creative	Best OTT Original
(South Korea) **Moving – The Walt Disney Company**; (South Korea) The Glory – Netflix; (South Korea) Little Women – Studio Dragon; (China) The Long Season – Tencent Video; (United States) Special Ops: Lioness – Paramount+ Korea	(South Korea) **Weak Hero Class 1 – Content Wavve**; (Thailand) Get Rich – PCCW OTT; (China) The Knockout – iQiyi & CCTV 8; (South Korea) Shadow Detective – The Walt Disney Company; (Taiwan) Wave Makers – DaMou Entertainment
Best Asian TV Series	Best Reality & Variety
(India) **Scoop – Netflix**; (Kazakhstan) The Black Yard – Salem Social Media; (Thailand) Delete – GDH 559; (South Korea) Not Others – KT Studio genie; Taiwan Crime Stories – Sixty Percent Productions, CalFilms & Imagine Entertainment	(South Korea) **Physical: 100 – Netflix**; **Let’s Feast Vietnam – BHD Vietnam Media Corp**; (South Korea) Bloody Game 2 – Content Wavve; (South Korea) Food Chronicle – TVing; (Philippines) One At Heart Jessica Soho: Wounds Of Woes – GMA Network; (South Korea) Our Game : LG Twins – LG Uplus & Studio X+U; (South Korea) Saturday Night Live Korea Season 3 & 4 – Coupang Play
Best Director	Best Writer
(China) **Xin Shuang – The Long Season, Tencent Video**; (South Korea) Han Jun-hee – D.P. 2, Netflix; (Japan) Yuri Kanchiku – First Love, Netflix; (Thailand) Parkpoom Wongpoom – Delete, GDH 559 Company	(South Korea) **Kang Full – Moving, The Walt Disney Company**; (Japan) Bakarhythm – Rebooting, Nippon TV; (South Korea) Jeong Seo-kyung – Little Women, Studio Dragon; (South Korea) Kim Eun-sook – The Glory, Netflix; (United States) Taylor Sheridan – Special Ops: Lioness, Paramount+ Korea
Best Lead Actor	Best Lead Actress
(South Korea) **Ryu Seung-ryong – Moving, The Walt Disney Company**; (Philippines) Arjo Atayde – Cattleya Killer, ABS-CBN; (China) Fan Wei – The Long Season, Tencent Video; (Thailand) Nat Kitcharit – Delete, GDH 559 Company; (Japan) Takeru Satoh – First Love, Netflix; (Japan) Yuya Yagira – Gannibal, The Walt Disney Company	(India) **Karishma Tanna – Scoop, Netflix**; Emily Chan – The Patient, Astro Malaysia; (Singapore) Rebecca Lim – Third Rail, Ochre Pictures; (South Korea) Song Hye-kyo – The Glory, Netflix; (United States) Zoe Saldaña – Special Ops: Lioness, Paramount+ Korea
Best Supporting Actor	Best Supporting Actress
**Hsueh Shih-ling – Taiwan Crime Stories, Sixty Percent Productions, Calfilms & Imagine Entertainment**; (South Korea) Jo Woo-jin – Narco-Saints, Netflix; (Thailand) Nichkhun Horvejkul – Finding The Rainbow, PCCW OTT; (Japan) Shota Sometani – Sanctuary, Netflix	(South Korea) **Lim Ji-yeon – The Glory, Netflix**; (Taiwan) Buffy Chen – Wave Makers, Damou Entertainment; (Thailand) Charlette Wasita Hermenau – Delete, GDH 559 Company; (South Korea) Kyung Soo-jin – Shadow Detective, The Walt Disney Company; (Japan) Shioli Kutsuna – Sanctuary, Netflix
Best Newcomer Actor	Best Newcomer Actress
(South Korea) **Lee Jung-ha – Moving, The Walt Disney Company**; (South Korea) Park Ji-hoon – Weak Hero Class 1, Content Wavve; (Thailand) Prudtichai Ruayfupant M – Nobody’s Happy If I’m Not, BEC World Public Co; (China) Wen Junhui – Exclusive Fairy Tale, iQiyi, Ningbo Three Magpies Culture Technology & Jiangsu Qijia Film & TV Culture Media	(South Korea) **Go Youn-jung – Moving, The Walt Disney Company**; (Singapore) Gini Chang – Last Madame: Sisters of the Night, Ochre Pictures; (China) Li Gengxi – The Long Season, Tencent; (Thailand) Phantira Pipityakorn – Get Rich, PCCW OTT; (Japan) Yagi Rikako – First Love, Netflix
Best Visual Effects
(South Korea) **Moving, The Walt Disney Company**; (South Korea) Big Bet, The Walt Disney Company; (China) The Long Season, Tencent; (China) Three-Body, Tencent Video

=== Invitation ===
Rising Star of the Year	Excellence Award
(China) **Wen Junhui (Exclusive Fairy Tale)**; (Taiwan) **Buffy Chen (Wave Makers)**	(Japan) **Yuya Yagira (Gannibal)**
Special Contribution for OTT Industry	Special Contribution for K-Content
(South Korea) **Watcha**	(Hong Kong) **Viu**; **(United States) Wavve Americas**
Creative Beyond Border	New Technology
(South Korea) **EXchange Season 2**; (South Korea) **One Day Off**	(South Korea) **TVING**
Lifetime Achievement Award
(South Korea) **Kim Jong-hak**
