= Mnet =

Mnet or M-net may refer to:

== Entertainment ==
- M-Net, a South Africa-based Sub-Saharan African subscription-funded television channel
  - M-Net Series, formerly The Series Channel, a defunct South African television brand that served as the television show channel arm of M-Net from 1998 to 2015
    - M-Net City, a former South African pay-television channel which merged with Vuzu in 2021 to form its successor, Me
  - M-Net Movies, the film-only television channel brand arm of M-Net
- Mnet, a name used by the CJ Group for the following brands owned by it:
  - Mnet (TV channel), a South Korean music television channel
  - Mnet Media, a South Korean entertainment company under the CJ group

== Other uses ==
- M-net (German ISP), a German internet service provider.
- Mnet (peer-to-peer network)
- MNET (interbank network), a Pakistani operator of inter-bank connectivity platform
- m.Net Corporation, an Australian telecommunications company
- MNet, the former credit card division of MCorp, now part of Bank One
