= Star News (South Korea) =

South Korean news website

- Native name: 스타뉴스
- Company type: News
- Website type: Media platform
- Available in: 6 languages
- List of languages: Korean; English; Japanese; Chinese; Russian; Vietnamese
- Founded: September 2004
- Headquarters: Seoul, {{{location_country}}}
- Country of origin: South Korea
- Owners: Star News Co., Ltd.
- CEO: Park Jun-cheol
- Industry: Digital newspaper
- Services: Entertainment; Sports; Broadcasting; Lifestyle; Culture
- Parent: Brilliant Korea Inc.
- Website: www.starnewskorea.com
- Current status: Active

Star News (Korean: 스타뉴스) is a South Korean news website. It is part of the Brilliant Korea media group, along with Money Today.

Park Jun-cheol has been CEO since 2019.
