= Yun Seok-yang =

South Korean whistleblower

- Born: 1966 (age 59–60); Iksan, Jeollabuk-do
- Known for: Whistle blowing
- Notable work: Press interview about the Defense Security Command's civilian inspection

Yun Seok-yang (Korean: 윤석양) (1966-) is a South Korean whistleblower. On October 4, 1990, Yun was an army soldier. He blew the whistle about illegal inspections of civilians at the Defense Security Command. He is a public interest informant who became the driving force for the presidential campaign of Roh Tae-woo that year.

== Early life ==
In 1966, he was born in Iksan, Jeollabuk-do, Korea. He became exhausted from student activism. He joined the ROK Army on active duty in May 1990. He was questioned by Lee Seung-sup and Chief Kim Hyo-su to confess his revolutionary activities and other members. He came back to Seobingo and was working with Kim Seong-seop, Se-jang Lee Seung-seop, Deputy Director Lee Deok-ryeol, Park Dae-ho and Cho Jae- He put three floppy disks in his bag and escaped the Security Command in the early morning of September 23, 1990.

== Whistle-blowing ==
Yun Seok-yang escaped the Army Security Command, visited the National Council of Churches in Korea and submitted a declaration of conscience and summary of his 80-day Army Security Command experience. On September 25, he called a senior colleague who worked as a reporter for the National Press Workers' Union and met him at Jongno-gu, Seoul and revealed that he was carrying materials from the Armed Forces Security Command.

On October 4, he held a press conference and revealed that "security companies are conducting inspections against 1,300 students, including politicians, journalists, professors and students. At that time, the data that he revealed included the house structure, entry and escape route, and relatives' residence. In the case of emergency martial law, and government-prepared materials in advance so that they can arrest them immediately.

Two years after his arrest, he was rearrested on suspicion of desertion from duty in 1992.

== After release ==
He completed his sentence and was released from prison in October 1994.

== Work ==
- The actual protagonist of 'Moby Dick', directed by Park In-jae who is Korean director in 2011.
