= List of awards and nominations received by Lim Yoona =

Lim Yoona awards and nominations
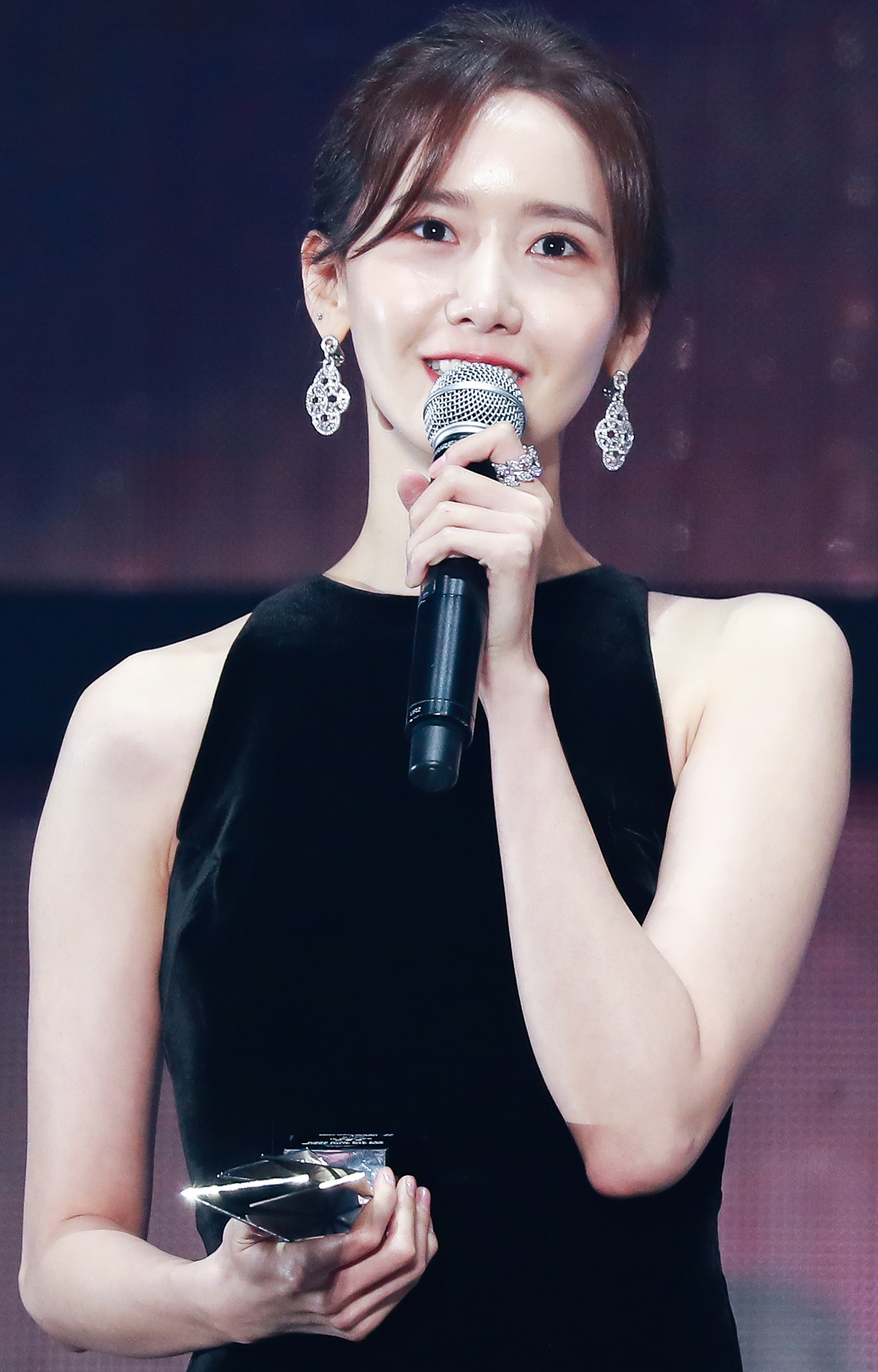
- Lim at the Asia Artist Awards in 2018
Awards and nominations
Award	Wins	Nominations
APAN Star Awards	2	8
Asan Chungmugong International Action Film Festival	1	1
Asia Artist Awards	10	11
Asian Film Awards	1	2
Asian TV Drama Conference	1	1
Asia Star Entertainer Awards	1	3
Baeksang Arts Awards	5	8
Brand Customer Loyalty Awards	3	3
Brand of The Year Awards	1	1
Blue Dragon Film Awards	4	9
Buil Film Awards	1	1
Busan International Advertising Festival	1	1
Busan International Film Festival	2	2
CeCi Beauty Awards	1	1
Chunsa Film Art Awards	1	2
CJ ENM Visionary Awards	1	1
Consumer Rights Day KCA Culture and Entertainment Awards	2	2
Cosmo Beauty Awards	1	1
Cosmo Glam Night	1	1
DongA's PICK Awards	1	1
Elle Style Awards Korea	1	1
Fundex Awards	3	4
Global Luxury Awards	1	1
Golden Cinematography Awards	1	1
Grand Bell Awards	1	2
International Film Festival and Awards Macao	2	2
JTBC Entertainment	1	1
KBS Drama Awards	5	6
KOPA & NIKON Press Photo Awards	1	1
Korea Best Dresser Swan Awards	1	1
Korea Drama Awards	1	3
Korea First Brand Awards	5	5
Korean Film Shining Star Awards	1	1
MAMA Awards	1	1
Marianas International Film Festival	1	1
MBC Drama Awards	2	3
MBC Gayo Daejejeon	1	1
Mnet 20's Choice Awards	0	1
MTN Broadcast Advertising Festival	1	1
National Brand Awards	1	1
Soompi Awards	1	1
The Seoul Awards	1	2
University Film Festival of Korea	1	1
Weibo Starlight Awards	1	1
Women in Film Korea Festival	1	1

Totals (Note: Certain award groups do not simply award one winner. They acknowledge several different recipients, have runners-up, and have third place. Since this is a specific recognition and is different from losing an award, runner-up mentions are considered wins in this award tally. For simplification and to avoid errors, each award in this list has been presumed to have had a prior nomination.)
- Wins: 77
- Nominations: 104

This is a list of awards and nominations received by South Korean singer and actress Lim Yoona. She has been the recipient of numerous awards, including five Baeksang Arts Awards, four Blue Dragon Film Awards, a Chunsa Film Art Award, a Grand Bell Award, a Buil Film Award and an Asian Film Award.

== Awards and nominations ==
Name of the award ceremony, year presented, category, nominee of the award, and the result of the nomination
Award ceremony	Year	Category	Nominee / work	Result	Ref.
APAN Star Awards	2023	Top Excellence Award, Actress in a Miniseries	King the Land	Nominated	
APAN Star Awards	2023	Global Star Award	King the Land	Nominated	
APAN Star Awards	2023	Popularity Star Award, Actress	King the Land	Won	
APAN Star Awards	2023	Best Couple Award	Lim Yoona (with Lee Jun-ho); King the Land	Won	
APAN Star Awards	2025	Top Excellence Award, Actress in a Miniseries	Bon Appétit, Your Majesty	Nominated	
APAN Star Awards	2025	Popularity Star Award, Actress	Bon Appétit, Your Majesty	Nominated	
APAN Star Awards	2025	Global Star Award	Bon Appétit, Your Majesty	Nominated	
APAN Star Awards	2025	Best Couple Award	Lim Yoona (with Lee Chae-min); Bon Appétit, Your Majesty	Nominated	
Asan Chungmugong International Action Film Festival	2022	Best Actress	Exit	Won	
Asia Artist Awards	2016	Asia Star Award, Actress	The K2	Won	
Asia Artist Awards	2016	Popularity Award, Actress	Lim Yoona	Won	
Asia Artist Awards	2017	Best Artist Award, Actress	The King In Love	Won	
Asia Artist Awards	2017	Popularity Award, Actress	Lim Yoona	Won	
Asia Artist Awards	2018	Trend Award	Lim Yoona	Won	
Asia Artist Awards	2019	Best Artist Award, Actress (Movie)	Exit	Won	
Asia Artist Awards	2019	Best Social Artist, Actress	Lim Yoona	Won	
Asia Artist Awards	2025	Best Actress of the Year – TV (Grand Prize)	Bon Appétit, Your Majesty	Won	
Asia Artist Awards	2025	Best Artist – Actor	Bon Appétit, Your Majesty	Won	
Asia Artist Awards	2025	Asia Star Awards	Bon Appétit, Your Majesty	Won	
Asia Artist Awards	2026	Popularity Award – Actress	Lim Yoona	Pending	
Asian TV Drama Conference	2017	Special Recognition Award for Contribution to Asian Cultural Exchange	God of War, Zhao Yun	Won	
Asian Film Awards	2018	Best Newcomer	Confidential Assignment	Nominated	
Asian Film Awards	2018	AFA Next Generation Award	Confidential Assignment	Won	
Asia Star Entertainer Awards	2026	Fan Choice Couple	Lim Yoona (with Lee Chae-min); Bon Appétit, Your Majesty	Won	
Asia Star Entertainer Awards	2026	Best Artist – Actress	Lim Yoona	Nominated	
Asia Star Entertainer Awards	2026	Fan Choice – Actress	Lim Yoona	Nominated	
Baeksang Arts Awards	2009	Best New Actress – Television	You Are My Destiny	Won	
Baeksang Arts Awards	2009	Most Popular Actress – Television	You Are My Destiny	Won	
Baeksang Arts Awards	2010	Most Popular Actress – Television	Cinderella Man	Won	
Baeksang Arts Awards	2017	Best New Actress – Film	Confidential Assignment	Nominated	
Baeksang Arts Awards	2017	Most Popular Actress – Film	Confidential Assignment	Won	
Baeksang Arts Awards	2022	Best Actress – Film	Miracle: Letters to the President	Nominated	
Baeksang Arts Awards	2026	Best Actress – Television	Bon Appétit, Your Majesty	Nominated	
Baeksang Arts Awards	2026	Naver Popularity Award – Female	Lim Yoona	Won	
Blue Dragon Film Awards	2017	Best New Actress	Confidential Assignment	Nominated	
Blue Dragon Film Awards	2019	Best Actress	Exit	Nominated	
Blue Dragon Film Awards	2019	Popular Star Award	Exit	Won	
Blue Dragon Film Awards	2021	Best Actress	Miracle: Letters to the President	Nominated	
Blue Dragon Film Awards	2021	Popular Star Award	Miracle: Letters to the President	Won	
Blue Dragon Film Awards	2022	Best Actress	Confidential Assignment 2: International	Nominated	
Blue Dragon Film Awards	2022	Popular Star Award	Confidential Assignment 2: International	Won	
Blue Dragon Film Awards	2025	Best Actress	Pretty Crazy	Nominated	
Blue Dragon Film Awards	2025	Popular Star Award	Pretty Crazy	Won	
Brand Customer Loyalty Awards	2020	Most Influential Multitainer	Lim Yoona	Won	
Brand Customer Loyalty Awards	2020	Most Influential Advertising Model	Lim Yoona	Won	
Brand Customer Loyalty Awards	2026	Best Actress (Drama)	Bon Appétit, Your Majesty	Won	
Brand of The Year Awards	2026	Female Actress Category – Indonesia	Lim Yoona	Won	
Buil Film Awards	2019	Most Popular Actress	Exit	Won	
Busan International Advertising Festival	2015	Best Korean Spokesmodel in China	Lim Yoona	Won	
Busan International Film Festival	2017	Marie Claire Asia Star Awards: Rising Star Award	Confidential Assignment	Won	
Busan International Film Festival	2019	Marie Claire Asia Star Awards: Face of Asia Award	Lim Yoona	Won	
CeCi Beauty Awards	2016	Asia Fashion Award	Lim Yoona	Won	
Chunsa Film Art Awards	2020	Best Actress	Exit	Nominated	
Chunsa Film Art Awards	2025	Best Actress	Pretty Crazy	Won	
CJ ENM Visionary Awards	2026	2026 Visionary	Bon Appétit, Your Majesty	Won	
Consumer Rights Day KCA Culture and Entertainment Awards	2023	2023 Viewers Choice - Actor of the Year	King the Land	Won	
Consumer Rights Day KCA Culture and Entertainment Awards	2025	2025 Viewers Choice - Actor of the Year	Pretty Crazy	Won	
Cosmo Beauty Awards	2018	Beauty Icon of the Year	Lim Yoona	Won	
Cosmo Glam Night	2019	Person of the Year	Lim Yoona	Won	
DongA's PICK Awards	2019	Acting without Loopholes Award	Exit	Won	
Elle Style Awards Korea	2017	K-style Icon	Lim Yoona	Won	
Fundex Awards	2022	Best of TV Drama Actress	Big Mouth	Won	
Fundex Awards	2023	Best of TV Drama Actress	King the Land	Won	
Fundex Awards	2025	Popular Star Prize – K-Drama Actress	Bon Appétit, Your Majesty	Won	
Fundex Awards	2025	Best Actress of TV Drama	Bon Appétit, Your Majesty	Nominated	
Global Luxury Awards	2015	International Cultural Exchange Award	Lim Yoona	Won	
Golden Cinematography Awards	2021	Popularity Award (Note: This award is based on selection by cinematographer.)	Lim Yoona	Won	
Grand Bell Awards	2017	Best New Actress	Confidential Assignment	Nominated	
Grand Bell Awards	2022	Best Supporting Actress	Confidential Assignment 2: International	Won	
International Film Festival and Awards Macao	2018	Talent Ambassador	Lim Yoona	Won	
International Film Festival and Awards Macao	2019	Variety Asian Stars Up Next Award	Exit	Won	
JTBC Entertainment	2019	Remarkable Achievement as Host&Entertainer	Hyori's Homestay	Won	
KBS Drama Awards	2008	Best New Actress	You Are My Destiny	Won	
KBS Drama Awards	2008	Netizen Award	You Are My Destiny	Won	
KBS Drama Awards	2012	Excellence Award, Best Actress in a Mid-length Drama	Love Rain	Nominated	
KBS Drama Awards	2012	Netizen Award	Love Rain	Won	
KBS Drama Awards	2013	Excellence Award, Best Actress in a Miniseries	Prime Minister and I	Won	
KBS Drama Awards	2013	Best Couple Award	Lim Yoona (with Lee Beom-soo); Prime Minister and I	Won	
KOPA & NIKON Press Photo Awards	2018	Most Photogenic Star of the Year	Lim Yoona	Won	
Korea Best Dresser Swan Awards	2016	Best Dressed Actress	Lim Yoona	Won	
Korea Drama Awards	2008	Netizen Popularity Award	You Are My Destiny	Won	
Korea Drama Awards	2017	Top Excellence Award, Actress	The King In Love	Nominated	
Korea Drama Awards	2026	Top Excellence Award, Actress	Bon Appétit, Your Majesty	Nominated	
Korea First Brand Awards	2020	Female Movie Actress	Exit	Won	
Korea First Brand Awards	2023	Female Actress (Drama)	Big Mouth	Won	
Korea First Brand Awards	2026	Actress (Vietnam)	Lim Yoona	Won	
Korea First Brand Awards	2026	Actress – Drama	Lim Yoona	Won	
Korea First Brand Awards	2026	Actress (Indonesia)	Lim Yoona	Won	
Korean Film Shining Star Awards	2017	Newcomer Award: Best New Actress	Confidential Assignment	Won	
MAMA Awards	2026	Fans' Choice Top 10 – Female	Lim Yoona	Won	
Marianas International Film Festival	2017	Best Popular Asian Actress	Confidential Assignment	Won	
MBC Drama Awards	2017	Popularity Award, Actress	The King in Love	Nominated	
MBC Drama Awards	2022	Top Excellence Award, Actress in a Miniseries	Big Mouth	Won	
MBC Drama Awards	2022	Best Couple Award	Lim Yoona (with Lee Jong-suk); Big Mouth	Won	
MBC Gayo Daejejeon	2025	10th Anniversary Special Award-MC	Lim Yoona	Won	
Mnet 20's Choice Awards	2012	20's Female Drama Star	Love Rain	Nominated	
MTN Broadcast Advertising Festival	2018	Female CF Star Award	Lim Yoona	Won	
National Brand Awards	2025	Grand Prize	Lim Yoona	Won	
Soompi Awards	2018	Actress of the Year	The King in Love	Won	
The Seoul Awards	2017	Best New Actress, Film	Confidential Assignment	Nominated	
The Seoul Awards	2017	Popularity Award, Actress	Confidential Assignment	Won	
University Film Festival of Korea	2018	Best Actress Award	Confidential Assignment	Won	
Weibo Starlight Awards	2021	Hall of Fame	Lim Yoona	Won	
Women in Film Korea Festival	2019	Best New Actress	Exit	Won	

== Other accolades ==
=== State and cultural honors ===
Name of country or organization, year given, and name of honor
Country or organization	Year	Honor	Ref.
Institute of National Brand Promotion (Note: Honors are given at the National Brand Conference, to acknowledge individuals and businesses who make an exceptional contribution to raising South Korea's brand image.)	2025	National Brand Award Grand Prize – Culture Sector	
National Tax Service (Note: Honors are presented at the Taxpayer's Day Ceremony in recognition of individuals and businesses that are dutiful and honest taxpayers and have made significant financial contributions to South Korea.)	2015	President's Commendation - Model Taxpayer Award	
Dongguk University	2010	Ministry of Culture, Sports and Tourism Award	
Dongguk University	2011	Prime Minister's Award	
Dongguk University	2015	The Lifetime Achievement Award	

=== Listicles ===
Name of publisher, year listed, name of listicle, and placement
Publisher	Year	Listicle	Placement	Ref.
Forbes	2016	30 Under 30 – Asia	Included	
Forbes	2018	Korea Power Celebrity 40	30th	
Forbes	2023	Korea Power Celebrity 40	19th	
Forbes	2024	Korea Power Celebrity 40	25th	
Forbes	2026	Korea Power Celebrity 40	34th	
Gallup Korea	2025	Television Actor of the Year	4th	
Korean Film Council	2021	Korean Actors 200 (Note: Introduces 200 actors that best represent the present and future of Korean cinema to the people in the film industry all over the world.)	Included	
Star News	2023	Best Idol-Actor of the Year (Female)	1st	
