= 2025 APAN Star Awards =

11th edition of award ceremony

- Official poster
- Date: December 29, 2025
- Site: Dongdaemun Design Plaza Arthall 1, Jung-gu, Seoul
- Presented by: Korea Entertainment Management Association; Seoul Economic Promotion Agency
- Hosted by: Kim Seung-woo; Park Sun-young

Highlights
- Most awards: When Life Gives You Tangerines (7)
- Most nominations: When Life Gives You Tangerines (12)
- Grand Prize: IU
- Drama of the Year: When Life Gives You Tangerines
- Website: APAN Star Awards

Television/radio coverage
- Network: tvN; TVING

The 2025 APAN Star Awards ceremony took place on December 29, 2025, at Dongdaemun Design Plaza Arthall 1 Jung-gu, Seoul. It was hosted by Kim Seung-woo and Park Sun-young. The awards ceremony integrates content from all channels, including domestic terrestrial broadcasting, general programming, cable, OTT, and web dramas, aired from November 2024 to October 2025.

At the awards ceremony, IU received the Daesang for her performance in When Life Gives You Tangerines while the drama itself was awarded with the title of Best Drama of the Year.

== Winners and nominees ==
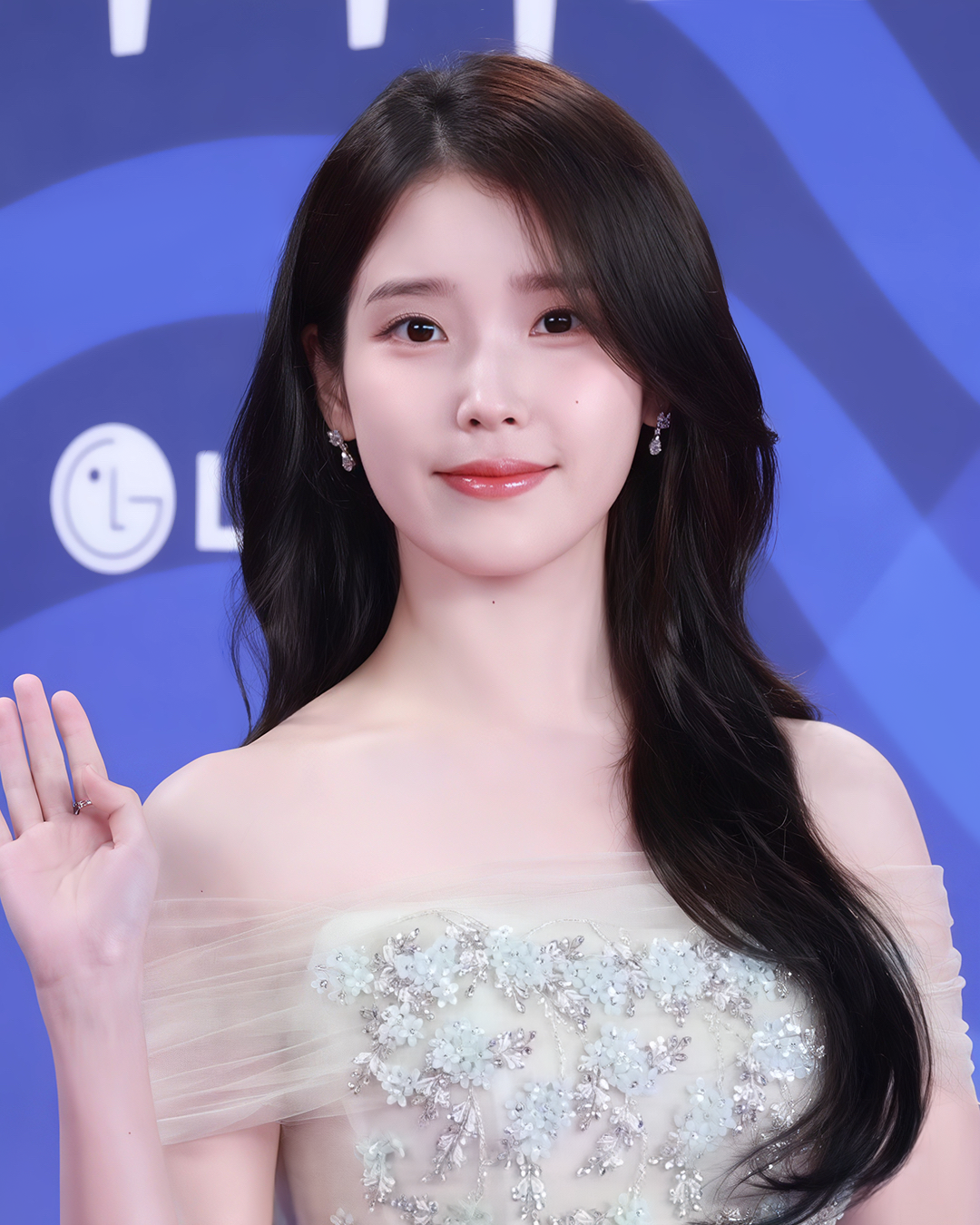
IU, winner of Grand Prize

Nominations were announced on December 1.

Grand Prize (Daesang): IU - When Life Gives You Tangerines	Drama of the Year: When Life Gives You Tangerines (Netflix); Our Unwritten Seoul (tvN, Netflix); The Tale of Lady Ok (JTBC); You and Everything Else (Netflix); Bon Appétit, Your Majesty (tvN, Netflix)
Best Director: Kim Won-seok – When Life Gives You Tangerines; Park Shin-woo – Our Unwritten Seoul; Lee Do-yoon – The Trauma Code: Heroes on Call; Jang Tae-yoo – Bon Appétit, Your Majesty; Jo Young-min – You and Everything Else	Best Screenwriter: Jang Hyun-sook – Typhoon Family; Park Ji-sook – The Tale of Lady Ok; Song Hye-jin – You and Everything Else; Lee Kang – Our Unwritten Seoul; Lim Sang-choon – When Life Gives You Tangerines
Top Excellence Award, Actor in a Miniseries: Lee Jun-ho – Typhoon Family; Kim Nam-gil – Trigger, The Fiery Priest 2; Park Bo-gum – Good Boy, When Life Gives You Tangerines; Park Hyung-sik – Buried Hearts; Joo Ji-hoon – The Trauma Code: Heroes on Call, Love Your Enemy	Top Excellence Award, Actress in a Miniseries: Cha Joo-young – The Queen Who Crowns; Kim Go-eun – You and Everything Else; Park Bo-young – Our Unwritten Seoul; IU – When Life Gives You Tangerines; Im Yoon-ah – Bon Appétit, Your Majesty
Excellence Award, Actor in a Miniseries: Lee Jun-young – When Life Gives You Tangerines, Pump Up the Healthy Love; Park Hae-joon – When Life Gives You Tangerines, Love, Take Two; Yoo Yeon-seok – When the Phone Rings; Lee Joon-hyuk – Love Scout, Mercy for None; Choo Young-woo – The Trauma Code: Heroes on Call, Head over Heels	Excellence Award, Actress in a Miniseries: Shin Ye-eun – The Murky Stream, A Hundred Memories; Go Yoon-jung – Resident Playbook; Park Ji-hyun – You and Everything Else; Yum Jung-ah – Love, Take Two, The Defects; Jang Yoon-ju – Ms. Incognito
Top Excellence Award, Actor in a Serial Drama: Ahn Jae-wook – For Eagle Brothers; Son Chang-min – Good Luck!; Song Chang-eui — Desperate Mrs. Seonju; Jung Il-woo – Our Golden Days; Hwang Dong-joo – Marie and Her Three Daddies	Top Excellence Award, Actress in a Serial Drama: Uhm Ji-won – For Eagle Brothers; Park Ha-na — My Merry Marriage; Jang Shin-young — The Woman Who Swallowed the Sun; Han Groo — Cinderella Game; Hahm Eun-jung — Queen’s House
Excellence Award, Actor in a Serial Drama: Seo Ha-jun – The Woman Who Swallowed the Sun; Kim Dong-wan – For Eagle Brothers; Park Sang-nam — My Merry Marriage; Seo Jun-young – Queen's House; Yoon Hyun-min – Our Golden Days	Excellence Award, Actress in a Serial Drama: Park Eun-hye — Marie and Her Three Daddies; Shim Yi-young — Desperate Mrs. Seonju; Lee Si-a — A Graceful Liar; Lee Tae-ran — Our Golden Days; Jung In-sun — Our Golden Days
Excellence Award, Actor in a Short Drama or Web Drama: Jung Gun-joo – The Road in Between; Kim Ki-hyun – No MZ for Old Men; Park Sung-woong – A Head Coach's Turnover; Park Soo-oh — A Head Coach's Turnover; Lee Dong-gun – A Love That's Completely Useless; Cha Sun-woo – He Is Back, Competition with me; Cha Hak-yeon – The Killer Next Door	Excellence Award, Actress in a Short Drama or Web Drama: Park Ha-sun – A Love That's Completely Useless, Psychopath Yeo Soon-jeong; Lee Soo-ji – No MZ for Old Men; Ha Ye-eun – Boss Yeo stays behind; Lee Hye-ri – Friendly Rivalry
Excellence Acting Award, Actor: Ko Kyu-pil - Genie, Make a Wish, Twelve; Yoon Kyung-ho — The Trauma Code: Heroes on Call; Sung Dong-il – Typhoon Family, The Art of Negotiation; Lee Hae-young – Buried Hearts; Choi Dae-hoon – When Life Gives You Tangerines, Shin's Project	Excellence Acting Award, Actress: Oh Na-ra – Villains Everywhere, The Nice Guy; Kim Shin-rok – Undercover High School, Tastefully Yours; Kang Ae-shim – Squid Game 2, 3, Love, Take Two; Yeom Hye-ran – When Life Gives You Tangerines, Law and the City; Won Mi-kyung – Our Unwritten Seoul
Best New Actor: Lee Chae-min – Bon Appétit, Your Majesty, Crushology 101; Kang You-seok — Resident Playbook, When Life Gives You Tangerines; Kim Min-kyu – Bitch x Rich 2, Love, Take Two; Kim Yo-han — The Winning Try; Ryeoun – Weak Hero Class 2, Namib	Best New Actress: Ha-young – The Trauma Code: Heroes on Call, Face Me; Hong Hwa-yeon – Buried Hearts, Tastefully Yours, I Am a Running Mate; Bang Hyo-rin — Aema; Shin Si-ah – Resident Playbook; Yoon Seo-ah – The Tale of Lady Ok, Bon Appétit, Your Majesty
Best Child Actor: Kim Tae-yeon — When Life Gives You Tangerines; Lee Cheon-mu – When Life Gives You Tangerines; Kim Si-a – Walking on Thin Ice; Moon Woo-jin – My Dearest Nemesis; Jo Dan – Villains Everywhere	Best Couple Award: Lee Hye-ri with Chung Su-bin – Friendly Rivalry; Im Yoon-ah with Lee Chae-min – Bon Appétit, Your Majesty; Bae Suzy with Kim Woo-bin – Genie, Make a Wish
Popularity Star Award, Actor: Lee Jun-ho; Park Seo-ham; Ji Chang-wook	Popularity Star Award, Actress: Kim Hye-yoon; Im Yoon-ah; Kim Se-jeong
Global Star Award: Lee Jun-ho; Byeon Woo-seok; Yook Sung-jae	Best Entertainer Award: Cha Eun-woo; Jeong Yun-ho; Lee Jun-young
Best Original Soundtrack: Lim Young-woong – "More Beautiful than Heaven" – Heavenly Ever After; Young Tak – "Unknown Life" – For Eagle Brothers; Jongho – "Just Like the First Time" – The Nice Guy	Asia Star Award: Jinyoung; Chung Su-bin
