= A Walk to Remember (EP) =

Extended play by Yoona

EP by Yoona
- Released: May 30, 2019
- Recorded: 2016–2019
- Genre: K-pop
- Language: Korean
- Labels: SM; Dreamus

Singles from A Walk to Remember
- 1. "Summer Night" Released: May 30, 2019

Music video
- "Summer Night" on YouTube

A Walk to Remember is the debut Korean extended play by South Korean singer Yoona. The EP was released digitally and physically on May 30, 2019, by SM Entertainment, to celebrate her 29th birthday. "Summer Night", featuring indie singer 20 Years of Age, was released as a single.

== Background and release ==
On May 24 it was announced that Im Yoon-ah will release her Korean debut EP "A Walk To Remember" with title track Summer Night on May 30, 2019.

Concept images were released from May 22 to May 27 and the music video teaser for "Summer Night" was released on May 27.

The music video, together with the EP, was released on May 30.

== Singles ==
The song "Deoksugung Stonewall Walkway" featuring 10cm was released on March 11, 2016, as part of SM Station Season 1.

The song "When The Wind Blows" was released on September 8, 2017, as part of SM Station Season 2.

The song "To You" was released on May 13, 2018, the song was written by Im Yoon-ah and composed by Lee Sang-soon during Hyori's Homestay 2.

== Commercial performance ==
A Walk to Remember debuted at number 3 on the Gaon Albums Chart. It also debuted at number 47 on Billboard Japan's Top Download Albums.

The EP went on to become the third best-selling album by a female soloist of 2019, behind IU's Love Poem and bandmate Taeyeon's Purpose.

On the iTunes Comprehensive Album Chart, it ranked first in 10 regions around the world, including Hong Kong, Malaysia, Philippines, Singapore, Taiwan, Thailand, Vietnam, Saudi Arabia, Peru, and Chile.

== Track listing ==
No.	Title	Lyrics	Music	Arrangement	Length
1.	"Deoksugung Stonewall Walkway" (덕수궁 돌담길의 봄; featuring 10cm)	Marco, Kwon Jung-yeol	Marco	Marco	3:16
2.	"Summer Night" (여름밤; featuring 20 Years of Age)	Foresko, Heo Sang-eun	Foresko, Heo Sang-eun	Foresko, Heo Sang-eun	4:01
3.	"When The Wind Blows" (바람이 불면)	YoonA, Conan (Rocoberry)	Conan (Rocoberry)	Conan (Rocoberry)	3:46
4.	"To You" (너에게)	YoonA	Lee Sang-soon	Lee Sang-soon, Cho Yoon-sung	4:35
5.	"Promise"	Godak	Godak, Park Tae-jin	Godak, Park Tae-jin	3:32
Total length:					19:19

== Charts ==
=== Weekly charts ===
Chart (2019)	Peak position
South Korean Albums (Gaon)	3
South Korean Albums (Gaon) (Kihno ver.)	20
US World Albums (Billboard)	13

=== Year-end charts ===
Chart (2019)	Position
South Korean Albums (Gaon)	99

=== Sales ===
Region	Sales
South Korea	49,862
South Korea (kihno ver)	3,355

== Release history ==
Region	Date	Format	Distributor
Various	May 30, 2019	Digital download	SM Entertainment; Dreamus
South Korea	May 30, 2019	Digital download	SM Entertainment; Dreamus
South Korea	May 30, 2019	CD	SM Entertainment; Dreamus
South Korea	June 5, 2019	kihno	SM Entertainment; Dreamus
