= Yoon Seo-ah =

South Korean actress (born 2000)

- Born: Im Sun-woo; 30 September 2000 (age 26); South Korea
- Occupation: Actress
- Years active: 2018–present
- Known for: Seo Ji-wan of Nevertheless and Seo Gil-geum of Bon Appétit, Your Majesty

Korean name
- Hangul: 임선우
- RR: Im Seonu
- MR: Im Sŏnu

Stage name
- Hangul: 윤서아
- RR: Yun Seoa
- MR: Yun Sŏa

Im Sun-woo (Korean: 임선우; born September 30, 2000), known by her stage name Yoon Seo-ah (Korean: 윤서아), is a South Korean actress. She is known for her supporting role as Seo Ji-wan in the Netflix series Nevertheless.

== Career ==
In her high school days, Yoon joined a short film production club.

Yoon debuted as an actress with the 2018 drama series Bad Papa, and later appeared in another series named Love Revolution. She also appeared in one episode of True Beauty, playing a teenage Lim Hee-kyung (originally portrayed by Im Se-mi).

In Nevertheless, Yoon played Seo Ji-wan, the best friend of Yoon Sol (Lee Ho-jung). With the role, the two became known as a love team, and Yoon became popular. Her performance with Lee Ho-jung was noted by allkpop.com as one of the most remarkable examples of LGBT representation in Korean drama.

Throughout 2022, Yoon portrayed guest roles such as Go Hye-rim in Juvenile Justice and Kim Seo-yeon in Soundtrack#1. She also played a supporting role as Ddong-geum in Bloody Heart. Later, she played the supporting role of Oh Nu-ri in drama Today's Webtoon.

In 2024, Yoon portrayed Chae Young-ji in the Netflix sci-fi dystopian series titled Goodbye Earth. She starred as Baek Yi in the JTBC romance historical drama titled The Tale of Lady Ok, alongside Lim Ji-yeon, Choo Young-woo, Kim Jae-won, Yeonwoo and Kim Mi-sook.

In 2025, Yoon starred as Seo Gil-geum in the fantasy survival romance television series titled Bon Appetit, Your Majesty, alongside Im Yoon-ah, Lee Chae-min and Kang Han-na.

On November 13, 2025, it was announced that Yoon will star in the upcoming Netflix fantasy romantic comedy series titled Beauty in the Beast, alongside Kim Min-ju, Moon Sang-min and Lomon, which revolves around a freshman student werewolf who—adapted to society—in enrolled at a university and falls in love with a campus senior there.

== Filmography ==
=== Television series ===
Year	Title	Role	Notes
2018	Bad Papa	Wang Hye-ji	Guest role
2019	The Nokdu Flower	Gisaeng	Guest role
2020	True Beauty	Teen Lim Hee-kyung	Guest role
2021	Nevertheless	Seo Ji-wan	
2022	Bloody Heart	Ddong-geum	
2022	Today's Webtoon	On Noo-ri	
2023	Kokdu: Season of Deity	Eun Ji	Guest role (ep. 2)
2024	The Tale of Lady Ok	Baek Yi	
2025	Bon Appétit, Your Majesty	Gil-geum	

=== Web series ===
Year	Title	Role	Notes
2020	Love Revolution	Bae Ji-yeon	
2022	Juvenile Justice	Go Hye-rim	Guest role (ep. 4–5)
2022	Soundtrack #1	Kim Seo-yeon	Guest role (ep. 4)
2024	Goodbye Earth	Chae Young-ji	
