= Crushology 101 =

2025 South Korean television series

- Promotional poster
- Hangul: 바니와 오빠들
- Lit.: Bunny and Her Boys
- RR: Baniwa oppadeul
- MR: Paniwa oppadŭl
- Genre: Romance drama; Coming-of-age
- Based on: Bunny and Her Oppas: Crushology 101 by Ni-eun
- Written by: Sung So-eun; Lee Sul
- Directed by: Kim Ji-hoon
- Starring: Roh Jeong-eui; Lee Chae-min; Cho Jun-young
- Music by: Lee Kwang-hee
- Country of origin: South Korea
- Original language: Korean
- No. of episodes: 12

Production
- Executive producers: Kim Min-ji; Park Ji-hye
- Producers: Lee Dae-yong; Jang Se-jeong
- Production company: Kakao Entertainment

Original release
- Network: MBC TV
- Release: April 11 – May 17, 2025

Crushology 101 (Korean: 바니와 오빠들) is a 2025 South Korean television series starring Roh Jeong-eui, Lee Chae-min and Cho Jun-young. Based on the 2019 Kakao Webtoon Bunny and Her Oppas by Ni-eun, the series depicts the love story of the female protagonist Bunny, who is surrounded by four attractive boys after breaking up with her dark first love. It premiered on MBC TV on April 11, 2025, and aired every Friday and Saturday at 21:50 (KST). It is also available for streaming on Kocowa and Viu in selected regions.

Its eighth episode on May 3, 2025 drew a rating of 0.7%, the lowest ever recorded for a drama airing in the prime time slot on a terrestrial television network. This record is shared with the February 20, 2025 episode of Kick Kick Kick Kick (which thereafter was moved to a late-night time slot and received lower ratings). Its peak single-episode rating of 1.5% and its overall average ratings of 1.0% are also the lowest ever recorded for a drama airing entirely in the prime time slot on a terrestrial television network.

== Synopsis ==
The drama follows a college student, Bunny, who breaks up with her first love after a disastrous relationship. Healing from a broken heart, she is suddenly courted by not one but four attractive men.

== Cast and characters ==
=== Main ===
- Roh Jeong-eui as Ban Hee-jin

A top sculpture student at Yein University who is better known by her nickname, Bunny. Although she excels both academically and personally, she is labeled a hopeless romantic after her first relationship ends in failure. Her love life takes a new turn when several charming men enter her life.

- Lee Chae-min as Hwang Jae-yeol

A talented visual design student at Yein University and the representative of the Visual Design Department. Aspiring to become an art director, he is widely respected by classmates, seniors, juniors, and female students across campus.

- Cho Jun-young as Cha Ji-won

A student from the top 0.1% who seems to have everything except flaws. Born into a wealthy family with good looks, intelligence, and a warm personality, he is the dream senior every freshman admires.

- Kim Hyun-jin as Jo A-rang

A promising and highly talented sculptor in the art world. Blessed with striking good looks and effortless flirting skills, he is a charismatic figure who easily captures the hearts of women.

- Hong Min-gi as Jin Hyun-oh

A Social Sports major at Gaun University who is devoted to basketball and Bunny's first love.

=== Supporting ===
- Kim Min-chul as Dong-ha

A college student. He is Jae-yeol's best friend, and he wants to become an art director.

- Choi Ji-su as Nam Kkot-nim

Bunny's best friend.

- Lee Ji-hoon as Ban Yeong-min

Bunny's father.

- Kim Hyun-mok as Ko Bong-su

Bunny's ex-boyfriend

- Jeon Joon-ho as Chun-sik
- Wang Bit-na as Hwang Jae-yeol's mother
- Nam Kyu-hee as Kwon Bo-bae

A campus goddess and Bunny's childhood friend. She has a warm personality and genuinely supports Bunny.

- Jeon So-young as Han Yeo-reum

She is Jaeyeol's first love and the youngest sports announcer.

== Production ==
=== Development ===
Crushology 101 is written by Sung So-eun, directed by Kim Ji-hoon, and produced by Kakao Entertainment. It is based on the Kakao Webtoon Bunny and Her Oppas: Crushology 101 by author Ni-eun, which has recorded 170 million cumulative views.

=== Casting ===
On April 30, 2024, Hankook Ilbo reported that Roh Jeong-eui had been cast as the lead role in the series. On May 1, it was reported that Lee Chae-min had decided to appear and was about to start filming. On September 19, Roh, Lee, and Cho Jun-young were confirmed.

== Original soundtrack ==
Crushology 101 OST Special

Soundtrack album by Various Artist
- Released: May 17, 2025
- Genre: Soundtrack
- Language: Korean
- Label: Kakao Entertainment

=== Part 1 ===
Released on April 11, 2025
No.	Title	Lyrics	Music	Artist	Length
1.	"Trace of Stars" (별의 흔적)	ALDRAIN, Park Ah-reum	ALDRAIN, CHAEIPAPA, AVOKID	ISA	4:24
2.	"Trace of Stars" (instrumental)				4:24

=== Part 2 ===
Released on April 12, 2025
No.	Title	Lyrics	Music	Artist	Length
1.	"Sunshine"	Go un, ALDRAIN, Lee Yoon-seo	Go un	DENI	3:56
2.	"Sunshine" (instrumental)				3:56

=== Part 3 ===
Released on April 18, 2025
No.	Title	Lyrics	Music	Artist	Length
1.	"As One In Your Painting" (너의 그림 속에 하나가 되어)	ALDRAIN	SENTIMENTAL SCENERY	Jung Se-woon	3:26
2.	"As One In Your Painting" (instrumental)				3:26

=== Part 4 ===
Released on April 26, 2025
No.	Title	Lyrics	Music	Artist	Length
1.	"By Your Side" (매일이 되어줄게)	Jinsol, Leeseon, Sanhae	Jinsol, Leeseon	Woody	3:59
2.	"By Your Side" (instrumental)				3:59

=== Part 5 ===
Released on May 2, 2025
No.	Title	Lyrics	Music	Artist	Length
1.	"What else" (내가 뭘 더)	eldon, Jaedogi, MooF	eldon, Jaedogi, MooF	Jung Seung-hwan	3:10
2.	"What else" (instrumental)				3:10

=== Part 6 ===
Released on May 3, 2025
No.	Title	Lyrics	Music	Artist	Length
1.	"You pour down on me" (네가 쏟아진다)	Choi Han-sol	Choi Han-sol, Choi Young-hoon, Wuk	Dragon Pony	4:00
2.	"You pour down on me" (instrumental)				4:00

=== Part 7 ===
Released on May 9, 2025
No.	Title	Lyrics	Music	Artist	Length
1.	"Our sea" (우리의 바다)	AVOKID, ALDRAIN, CHAEIPAPA	ALDRAIN, CHAEIPAPA, Oh Sung-hwan	KyoungSeo	4:30
2.	"Our sea" (instrumental)				4:30

=== Part 8 ===
Released on May 10, 2025
No.	Title	Lyrics	Music	Artist	Length
1.	"End of a Day" (하루의 끝)	Kim Beom-joo, Kim Si-hyuk	Kim Beom-joo, Kim Si-hyuk	Jeong Hyo-bean	3:56
2.	"End of a Day" (instrumental)				3:56

== Ratings ==
Average TV viewership ratings (Nationwide)
Ep.	Original broadcast date	Average audience share (Nielsen Korea)
1	April 11, 2025	1.3% (34th)
2	April 12, 2025	0.9% (59th)
3	April 18, 2025	1.5% (30th)
4	April 19, 2025	1.1% (47th)
5	April 25, 2025	1.1% (36th)
6	April 26, 2025	0.9% (54th)
7	May 2, 2025	0.8% (47th)
8	May 3, 2025	0.7% (69th)
9	May 9, 2025	1.2% (32nd)
10	May 10, 2025	0.8% (58th)
11	May 16, 2025	0.9% (45th)
12	May 17, 2025	0.8% (61st)
Average		1.0%
In the table above, the blue numbers represent the lowest ratings and the red numbers represent the highest ratings.

== Awards and nominations ==
Year	Award ceremony	Category	Recipient	Result	Ref.
2025	Korea Drama Awards	Best New Actress	Roh Jeong-eui	Nominated	
2025	MBC Drama Awards	Best Couple Award	Lee Chae-min with Roh Jeong-eui	Nominated	
2025	MBC Drama Awards	Excellence Award, Actress in a Miniseries	Roh Jeong-eui	Nominated	
2025	MBC Drama Awards	Best New Actor	Lee Chae-min	Won	
2025	MBC Drama Awards	Best New Actor	Cho Jun-young	Nominated	
2025	APAN Star Awards	Best New Actor	Lee Chae-min	Won	
