= The Tale of Lady Ok =

2024–2025 South Korean television series

- Promotional poster
- Hangul: 옥씨부인전
- Lit.: The Story of Lady Ok
- RR: Okssi buinjeon
- MR: Okssi puinjŏn
- Genre: Historical drama; Romantic thriller
- Written by: Park Ji-sook
- Directed by: Jin Hyuk
- Starring: Lim Ji-yeon; Choo Young-woo; Yeonwoo; Kim Jae-won
- Music by: Chung Yea-kyung
- Opening theme: "Bold Escape" by: Chung Yea-kyung; Forest Christenson
- Country of origin: South Korea
- Original language: Korean
- No. of episodes: 16

Production
- Running time: 70–85 minutes
- Production companies: SLL; Copus Korea Co. Ltd.

Original release
- Network: JTBC
- Release: November 30, 2024 – January 26, 2025

The Tale of Lady Ok (Korean: 옥씨부인전) is a South Korean television series starring Lim Ji-yeon, Choo Young-woo, Yeonwoo and Kim Jae-won. It aired on JTBC every Saturday and Sunday at 22:30 (KST) from November 30, 2024 to January 26, 2025. It is also available for streaming on Viu and Kocowa in selected regions.

== Synopsis ==
Set in the Joseon period, the story is about the journey to success of a female slave named Goo Deok, whose name "Ok Tae-young", status, and even her husband were fake.

Goo Deok is a servant who escapes slavery and later becomes a legal expert, assuming the name of "Ok Tae-young". Even in difficult situations, she does not hesitate to help people. However, she has a secret. Her secret is that her name, husband, and her status are all fake. She happens to meet Cheon Seung-hwi. He is a story-teller and travels all around the country, reciting stories to people. He happens to meet "Ok Tae-young" and falls in love with her at first sight.

== Cast ==
=== Main ===
- Lim Ji-yeon as "Ok Tae-young" / Goo Deok

A legal expert in Joseon. She is loved by everyone because she helps others even in difficult situations. However, her assumed name, identity, and even her husband are all fake.

- Choo Young-woo as Song Seo-in / Cheon Seung-hwi / Sung Yoon-gyeom

1. Seung-hwi – A story-teller who covers his face with a veil and travels around the country reciting novels to people. He falls in love with "Ok Tae-young" at first sight when he meets her by chance and supports her wholeheartedly even after he finds out about her true identity.
2. Yoon-gyeom – Do-gyeom's older brother and later husband of "Ok Tae-young" who strongly resembles Seung-hwi.

- Yeonwoo as Cha Mi-ryeong / Baek Sun-hee
  - Choi Da-hye as young Baek Sun-hee

An eager apprentice learning from "Ok Tae-young", and Lord Cha Cheon-sik and Lady Hong's daughter, assuming the name "Cha Mi-ryeong". "Cha Mi-ryeong" is hiding her secret as being Lady Song's daughter and is looking for revenge on Ok Tae-young.

- Kim Jae-won as Sung Do-gyeom

A beloved figure in the village. Sung Do-gyeom holds great respect for "Ok Tae-young" who has been a pillar of support since his childhood.

=== Supporting ===
- Kim Mi-sook as Mrs. Han

The real Ok Tae-young's grandmother.

- Lee Jae-won as Man Seok

Seung-hwi's servant and best friend.

- Kim Jae-hwa as Mak Sim

The Ok family's servant and "Tae-young"'s devoted admirer.

- Yoon Seo-ah as Baek Yi

Mak Sim's daughter and "Tae-young"'s servant and best friend. (eps. 1–3)

- Oh Dae-hwan as Ddokki

A male servant of the OK family who likes Mak Sim.

- Yoon Ji-hye as Madam Kim

The head of Yuhyangso (유향소, translated as Mother's Sanctuary).

- Lee Seo-hwan as Kim Nak-soo

A rich but greedy nobleman and Goo Deok's villainous master.

- Ha Yul-ri as Kim So-hye

Kim Nak-soo's daughter who often abuses Goo-deok and the other servants, and sought revenge against Goo-deok after she ran away. She was later made a government slave for her criminal association with Park Jun-gi.

- Jeon Ik-ryung as Lady Song

A vicious and cruel person who treats slaves like animals and commits atrocities that are brutal, ruthless and creepy.

- Kim Sun-bin as Baek Do-gwang

Lady Song's son.

- Yoon Hee-seok as Lord Cha Cheon-sik
- Hong Jin-ki as Kkeut Dongi

"Tae-young"'s family member.

- Jung Soo-young as Mrs. Hong
- Hong Bi-ra as Lady Lee
- Sung Dong-il as Sung Kyu-Jin

A just and righteous magistrate who is the father of Yoon-gyeom and Do-gyeom.

- Choi Jung-woo as Park Jun-gi

A corrupt and immoral official who marries So-Hye as his concubine and also schemed to get rid of "Tae-young". He was, in the end, arrested for corruption and died from torture.

- Kim Dong-gyun as Lee Chung-il

Madam Kim's husband.

=== Special appearances ===
- Son Na-eun as Ok Tae-young

The real Ok Tae-young, who died in a fire.

- Lee Sang-hee as Gae Jook

Kim Nak-soo's servant and Goo Deok's father.

== Production ==
=== Development ===
Director Jin Hyuk, who previously worked on Master's Sun (2013), The Legend of the Blue Sea (2016–2017) and Sisyphus: The Myth (2021), and writer Park Ji-sook, who wrote My Spring Days (2014) and Uncle (2021–2022), teamed up to create the series.

=== Casting ===
On December 6, 2023, it was reported that Lim Ji-yeon and Choo Young-woo were confirmed as the lead actors of the series. On May 28, 2024, actor Lee Jae-won was confirmed to join the cast. On June 11, 2024, Yeonwoo and Kim Jae-won were reported to appear in the series.

== Release ==
JTBC confirmed that the series would premiere in the second half of 2024. The series was confirmed to broadcast on November 30, 2024, and would be airing every Saturday and Sunday at 22:30 (KST). It would also be available to stream on Kocowa in the Americas, Europe, and Oceania.

== Reception ==
=== Critical response ===
The Korea Times praised The Tale of Lady Ok for its progressive depiction of Goo-deok (Lim Ji-yeon), a female slave who defies societal norms in the Joseon dynasty to become a legal advocate for the oppressed. Lim's powerful performance and the drama's fusion of historical and modern themes resonated with viewers, and the story was commended for empowering women through a compelling narrative of justice and resilience.

Pierce Conran of South China Morning Post highlights The Tale of Lady Ok as a refreshing departure from typical Joseon-era dramas. Lim Ji-yeon's compelling portrayal of Ok Tae-young was praised as a character evolving from a servant to a noblewoman, adding depth to the genre's traditional costume intrigue. The drama's nuanced storytelling and engaging performances captivated viewers with its focus on personal transformation within a period setting offers a unique twist to familiar narratives.

Writing for Forbes, Joan MacDonald praised Lim Ji-yeon for her convincing Lady Ok/Goo-deok, someone whose spirit could not be confined by the limitations of her surroundings.

Drama critic Gong Hee-jung praised Lim Ji-yeon for showing significant growth and maturity in her performance. She noted that Lim skillfully blended the character's emotions with the personality Ok Tae-young might possess, reflecting the actress's effort. Lim was also praised for fitting seamlessly into the role of a self-reliant woman overcoming challenges. Gong highlighted that while many dramas portray women's independence, The Tale of Lady Ok stands out for focusing on resolving issues within a legal framework rather than solely through personal effort.

=== Ranking ===
The series ranked eighth globally on Netflix's "TV Shows (Non-English)" from December 2 to 8, 2024, with 1.6 million views despite being only released in some Asian regions initially. The Top 10 countries included Indonesia, South Korea, Malaysia, Philippines, Singapore, Thailand, Taiwan and Vietnam.

The show also generated significant buzz in South Korea, leading the drama category on Good Data Corporation FUNdex as of December 10 and topping both TV and OTT charts within two weeks of its release. Lim Ji-yeon and Choo Young-woo ranked first and second in actor popularity respectively. Lim maintained her top spot for drama performers who generated the most buzz for two consecutive weeks in a row.

=== 61st Baeksang Arts Awards ===
Actress Lim Ji-yeon was unexpectedly excluded from the Best Actress – Television category at the 61st Baeksang Arts Awards, despite leading The Tale of Lady Ok, which achieved high ratings (peaking over 13%) and critical acclaim. While the drama itself and her co-star Choo Young-woo received nominations, Lim's absence from the list sparked widespread confusion and disappointment among fans and viewers. Public opinion was divided — some accepted the limitation of spots, while others insisted Lim's performance warranted recognition.

== Viewership ==
The Tale of Lady Ok : South Korea viewers per episode (millions)

Season	Episode number																Average
Season	1	2	3	4	5	6	7	8	9	10	11	12	13	14	15	16	Average
1	0.920	1.490	1.666	1.921	1.789	2.097	1.714	1.984	2.461	2.632	1.861	2.106	1.923	2.313	2.401	3.292	2.038

Source: Audience measurement performed nationwide by Nielsen Korea.

Average TV viewership ratings
Ep.	Original broadcast date	Average audience share (Nielsen Korea)	
Ep.	Original broadcast date	Nationwide	Seoul
1	November 30, 2024	4.206% (1st)	4.690% (1st)
2	December 1, 2024	6.813% (1st)	7.190% (1st)
3	December 8, 2024	7.786% (1st)	8.081% (1st)
4	December 15, 2024	8.496% (1st)	8.892% (1st)
5	December 21, 2024	7.863% (1st)	8.708% (1st)
6	December 22, 2024	9.124% (1st)	9.224% (1st)
7	December 28, 2024	8.077% (1st)	7.857% (1st)
8	December 29, 2024	9.457% (1st)	9.135% (1st)
9	January 4, 2025	10.338% (1st)	10.597% (1st)
10	January 5, 2025	11.061% (1st)	11.849% (1st)
11	January 11, 2025	7.689% (1st)	8.321% (1st)
12	January 12, 2025	9.200% (1st)	10.226% (1st)
13	January 18, 2025	8.406% (1st)	9.132% (1st)
14	January 19, 2025	9.836% (1st)	10.758% (1st)
15	January 25, 2025	10.201% (1st)	10.869% (1st)
16	January 26, 2025	13.575% (1st)	14.030% (1st)
Average		8.882%	9.347%
In the table above, the blue numbers represent the lowest ratings and the red numbers represent the highest ratings.; This drama aired on a cable channel/pay TV which normally has a relatively smaller audience compared to free-to-air TV/public broadcasters (KBS, SBS, MBC, and EBS).

== Accolades ==
=== Awards and nominations ===
Award ceremony	Year	Category	Nominee	Result	Ref.
Baeksang Arts Awards	2025	Best Drama	The Tale of Lady Ok	Nominated	
Baeksang Arts Awards	2025	Best Supporting Actress	Kim Jae-hwa	Nominated	
Baeksang Arts Awards	2025	Best New Actor	Choo Young-woo	Won	
Baeksang Arts Awards	2025	Best Screenplay	Park Ji-sook	Nominated	
Bechdel Day	2025	Bechdel Choice 10	The Tale of Lady Ok	Included	
Korea Drama Awards	2025	Best Drama	The Tale of Lady Ok	Nominated	
Korea Drama Awards	2025	Top Excellence Award (Actress)	Lim Ji-yeon	Nominated	
Korea Drama Awards	2025	Best New Actor	Choo Young-woo	Won	
Broadcast Critics Awards	2025	Drama	The Tale of Lady Ok	Won	
Seoul International Drama Awards	2025	Outstanding Asian Star	Lim Ji-yeon	Nominated	
Seoul International Drama Awards	2025	Outstanding Asian Star	Choo Young-woo	Nominated	

=== Listicles ===
Name of publisher, year listed, name of listicle, and placement
Publisher	Year	Listicle	Placement	Ref.
Time	2025	The 10 Best K-Dramas of 2025	8th	
