= Prime Minister & I =

2013 South Korean television series

- Promotional poster
- Also known as: Prime Minister is Dating
- Hangul: 총리와 나
- Hanja: 總理와 나
- RR: Chongniwa na
- MR: Ch'ongniwa na
- Genre: Comedy; Romance; Drama
- Written by: Kim Eun-hee; Yoon Eun-kyung
- Directed by: Lee So-yeon
- Starring: Im Yoon-ah; Lee Beom-soo; Yoon Shi-yoon; Chae Jung-an; Ryu Jin
- Theme music composer: Noh Young-shim
- Country of origin: South Korea
- Original language: Korean
- No. of episodes: 17

Production
- Executive producer: Kim Hyeong-il
- Producer: Park Man-young
- Production location: South Korea
- Camera setup: Multiple-camera setup
- Running time: 60 minutes on Mondays and Tuesdays at 22:00 (KST)
- Production company: SM Culture & Contents

Original release
- Network: KBS2
- Release: December 9, 2013 – February 4, 2014

Prime Minister & I (Korean: 총리와 나; RR: Chongniwa na) is a 2013 South Korean television drama starring Im Yoon-ah, Lee Beom-soo, Yoon Shi-yoon, Chae Jung-an and Ryu Jin. It aired on KBS2 from December 9, 2013 to February 4, 2014 on Mondays and Tuesdays at 22:00 for 17 episodes.

== Plot ==
At 42 years old, Kwon Yul (Lee Beom-soo) is South Korea's youngest prime minister ever. On top of his reputation as an honest man of the utmost integrity, he's also a widower as his wife died in a car accident 7 years ago and raises his three children alone. But what the public doesn't know is that despite his perfect image, Yul is actually a struggling father devoid of even the most basic of parenting skills. Nam Da-jung (Im Yoon-ah) is a journalist from Scandal News who resorts to writing for a trashy tabloid to support her ailing father, but when she chases Prime Minister Kwon for a lucrative exposé, she ends up scooping a whole lot more than she bargained for and the two ended up in a contract marriage and later on fell in love with each other.

== Cast ==
=== Main characters ===
- Im Yoon-ah as Nam Da-jung

Nam Da-jung is a 28-year-old tabloid reporter. She has been working for her paper for three years, and is in charge of covering romance scandals. She is actually a very clumsy woman, constantly making mistakes and embarrassing herself. She once dreamed of becoming a novelist like Jane Austen; however, in a society where one cannot make money out of "arts and culture," becoming an author is a distant dream for her. In the end, she ends up using her writing and editing skills, as well as her photographer's eye to become a reporter for Scandal News. Because of her Alzheimer's-afflicted father's extended stay in a nursing home, she has to work tirelessly to support him. For the sake of achieving "the next big scoop," she follows Kwon Yul day and night in an attempt to score an exclusive.

- Lee Beom-soo as Kwon Yul

Kwon Yul, 42 years old, is Korea's youngest Prime Minister. Yul is a widower who lost his wife in a car accident seven years ago and is now raising his three children alone. He has a reputation of being an honest man with high integrity, but at home, Yul has a troubled relationship with his children, and has a tactless mouth that phrases nice things into horrible words. He is a world-renowned leader, yet at the same time, he cannot even cook a bowl of noodles.

- Yoon Shi-yoon as Kang In-ho

Kang In-ho, 32 years old, is the new Chief of Staff in the Prime Minister's office. He speaks at least four other languages other than his native tongue of Korean - those languages include Chinese, Japanese, English, and Spanish. Ever since the first time he had met Nam Da-jung, he found her unique and interesting. However, when she started pestering Kwon Yul to marry her, In-ho began to perceive Da-jung as just another woman who wants to get close to the Prime Minister, and despised her greatly. Later on, when he got to know the reason behind Da-jung's actions, he regrets misunderstanding her. Deciding that he doesn't want to have any more regrets in life, he falls further in love with her. He just wants to prove to Da-jung that when he said he would protect her, he truly meant it.

- Chae Jung-an as Seo Hye-joo
  - Jung Da-bin as young Hye-joo

Seo Hye-joo, 35 years old, was Kwon Yul's hubae from university and is the staffer closest to him. She has also been his secretary and confidant since his assemblyman days. Calmer than anyone, she is a decisive and smart woman, but a fool when it comes to love. In college, she fell in love with Yul at first sight, but never disclosed her affection for him. She continued to hide her feelings as they worked together, and is satisfied with just being able to always stay beside Yul. Until one day, Nam Da-jung appears in their lives and puts herself on a path that Hye-joo has never crossed. This drives her mad.

- Ryu Jin as Park Joon-ki

Park Joon-ki, 42 years old, Minister of Strategy and Finance, is Kwon Yul's brother-in-law and political opponent. He is a man full of confidence and ambition, and is currently in a political marriage with Na Yoon-hee. He works hard for his career, and awaits his time to shine. During his university years, he and Yul were very good friends, but their friendship ended when he found out that his first love, Seo Hye-joo, was in love with Yul. He assumed that his sister Na-young's death was due to the weariness caused by her husband, and thus cannot forgive Yul. His only ambition is to win against Kwon Yul in every field.

=== Supporting characters ===
- Choi Soo-han as Kwon Woo-ri

Kwon Woo-ri, 15 years old, is the eldest of Kwon Yul's children. Woo-ri is in his first year of high school.

- Jeon Min-seo as Kwon Na-ra

Kwon Na-ra, 12 years old, is the second child and only daughter of Kwon Yul. Na-ra is a sixth grader in middle school.

- Lee Do-hyun as Kwon Man-se

Kwon Man-se, 7 years old, is the youngest child and son of Kwon Yul. Man-se has just recently started primary school as a first grader.

- Jeon Won-joo as Na Young-soon
- Lee Young-beom as Shim Sung-il
- Lee Han-wi as Nam Yoo-sik, Da-jung's father who is suffering from Alzheimer's
- Choi Deok-moon as Go Dal-pyo
- Lee Tae-ri (Note: Credited as Lee Min-ho.) as Park Hee-chul, Da-jung's aide
- Min Sung-wook as Byun Woo-chul, reporter who is Da-jung's nemesis
- Yoon Hae-young as Na Yoon-hee, Park Joon-ki's wife
- Jung Ae-yeon as Park Na-young, Kwon Yul's wife
- Kim Ji-wan as Kang Soo-ho
- Jang Hee-woong as Bae In-kwon
- Song Min-hyung as Kim Tae-man
- Kim Jong-soo as Gong Taek-soo
- Hong Sung-sook as Jang Eun-hye
- Lee Yong-yi as Lee Dal-ja
- Ko Joo-yeon as Roori
- Han Young-je as Kwon Yul's bodyguard
- Lee Deok-hwa as Na Yoon-hee's father (cameo, ep 6)
- Kim Jun-myeon as Han Tae-woong (cameo, ep 10-12)
- Oh Man-seok as gangster (cameo, ep 12)
- Ryu Ui-hyun as Hyeon-seo

== Soundtrack ==
Noh Young-shim was the music director and theme music composer of the drama series. "Footsteps," the first track to be previewed on the series at the end of its third episode, was composed and arranged by Kim Jung-bae with the vocals by Taemin of the K-pop boyband Shinee. A representative from the drama's production company said that the song "complements the snow fall of winter" and is "set to make the drama warmer."

== Ratings ==
In the table below, the blue numbers represent the lowest ratings and the red numbers represent the highest ratings.

Episode #	Original broadcast date	Average audience share			
Episode #	Original broadcast date	TNmS Ratings		AGB Nielsen	
Episode #	Original broadcast date	Nationwide	Seoul National Capital Area	Nationwide	Seoul National Capital Area
1	December 9, 2013	5.4%	5.8%	5.9%	5.4%
2	December 10, 2013	5.0%	5.9%	5.4%	5.0%
3	December 16, 2013	5.5%	6.1%	7.3%	7.4%
4	December 17, 2013	5.8%	6.4%	6.5%	7.0%
5	December 23, 2013	6.0%	6.1%	5.9%	5.5%
6	December 24, 2013	5.5%	5.9%	5.7%	5.4%
7	December 30, 2013	9.0%	10.6%	8.9%	10.0%
8	January 6, 2014	6.0%	6.1%	7.3%	8.3%
9	January 7, 2014	7.3%	8.3%	7.3%	8.0%
10	January 13, 2014	6.7%	7.0%	9.9%	9.1%
11	January 14, 2014	8.6%	7.3%	9.5%	8.7%
12	January 20, 2014	6.2%	6.5%	6.1%	6.2%
13	January 21, 2014	5.5%	5.6%	6.0%	6.3%
14	January 27, 2014	5.8%	6.7%	5.5%	6.3%
15	January 28, 2014	5.8%	6.1%	6.1%	6.3%
16	February 3, 2014	5.7%	5.8%	4.9%	5.6%
17	February 4, 2014	5.9%	6.3%	6.1%	6.1%
Average		6.2%	6.6%	6.9%	6.9%

== Awards and nominations ==
Year	Award	Category	Recipient	Result
2013	27th KBS Drama Awards	Excellence Award, Actor in a Miniseries	Lee Beom-soo	Nominated
2013	27th KBS Drama Awards	Excellence Award, Actress in a Miniseries	Im Yoon-ah	Won
2013	27th KBS Drama Awards	Best Couple Award	Lee Beom-soo and Im Yoon-ah	Won
2014	16th Seoul International Youth Film Festival	Best Young Actress	Im Yoon-ah	Nominated
