= King the Land =

2023 South Korean television series

- Promotional poster
- Hangul: 킹더랜드
- RR: Kingdeoraendeu
- MR: K'ingdŏraendŭ
- Genre: Romantic comedy
- Created by: Cheon Sung-il
- Written by: Choi Rom
- Directed by: Im Hyun-wook
- Starring: Lee Jun-ho; Im Yoon-ah
- Music by: Moon Seong-nam
- Opening theme: "Yellow Light" by Gaho
- Ending theme: "Confess To You" by Lim Kim
- Country of origin: South Korea
- Original language: Korean
- No. of episodes: 16

Production
- Production locations: South Korea; Thailand
- Running time: 70 minutes
- Production companies: Npio Entertainment; By4m Studio; SLL

Original release
- Network: JTBC
- Release: June 17 – August 6, 2023

King the Land (Korean: 킹더랜드) is a 2023 South Korean television series starring Lee Jun-ho and Im Yoon-ah. It aired on JTBC from June 17 to August 6, 2023, every Saturday and Sunday at 22:30 (KST) for 16 episodes. It is also available for streaming on TVING in South Korea and on Netflix in selected regions.

== Synopsis ==
King the Land tells the story of Gu Won who is the heir of The King Group, a luxury hotel conglomerate, who was thrown into an inheritance war, and Cheon Sa-rang, a hotelier who always has a smile on her face till she meets Gu Won.

== Cast ==
=== Main ===
- Lee Jun-ho as Gu Won

The heir and head general manager of King Hotel.

- Im Yoon-ah as Cheon Sa-rang

A hotelier and the "smile queen" of the King Hotel.

=== Supporting ===
==== People around Gu Won ====
- Son Byong-ho as Gu Il-hoon

Gu Won's father who is the chairman of King Group.

- Kim Seon-young as Gu Hwa-ran

Gu Won's older half-sister and the eldest daughter of King Group.

- Kim Dong-ha as Yoon Ji-hoo

Hwa-ran's son.

- Ahn Se-ha as Noh Sang-sik

Gu Won's friend and secretary.

==== People around Cheon Sa-rang ====
- Go Won-hee as Oh Pyung-hwa

Sa-rang's best friend who is a flight attendant of King Air.

- Kim Ga-eun as Kang Da-eul

Sa-rang's best friend and a working mother who is a "sales king" of Alanga, a duty-free store affiliated with King Group.

- Kim Young-ok as Cha Soon-hee

Sa-rang's grandmother.

==== Employees at King Group ====
- Kim Jae-won as Lee Ro-woon

A flight attendant of King Air who has a crush on Pyeong-Hwa.

- Gong Ye-ji as Kim Soo-mi

The manager of King Hotel. She took a disliking to Sa-rang because of her talents and her status.

- Kim Jung-min as Jeon Min-seo

The general manager of King the Land, King Hotel's VVIP Lounge.

- Choi Ji-hyun as Ha-na

A member of King the Land's team.

- Kim Chae-yun as Doo-ri

A member of King the Land's team.

- Lee Ho-seok as Se-ho

A member of King the Land's team.

- Lee Ji-hye as Do Ra-hee

A supervisor of Alanga, King Group Fashion.

==== Others ====
- Choi Tae-hwan as Seo Chung-jae

Da-eul's husband.

- Lee Ye-joo as Seo Cho-rong

Da-eul's only daughter.

- Jo Won-jo as Professor Yoon

Hwa-ran's husband.

=== Special appearances ===
- Nam Gi-ae as Han Mi-so (Ep. 14–16)

Gu Won's mother.

- Ahn Woo-yeon as Gong Yoo-nam (Ep. 1–5)

Sa-rang's ex-boyfriend.

- Kim Sung-eun as a senior flight attendant of King Air (Ep. 1)
- Lee Hye-sung as an interviewee for new hotelier (Ep. 1)
- Kang Ki-doong as Choi Tae-man (Ep. 1)
- Jin Seon-kyu as a policeman (Ep. 4)
- Anupam Tripathi as Prince Samir (Ep. 7–8)
- Jang Mi-ja as Chairman Han's Mother (Ep. 2-4, 7, 11)

== Original soundtrack ==
=== Part 1 ===
Released on June 18, 2023
No.	Title	Lyrics	Music	Artist	Length
1.	"Yellow Light"	Humbler; Kim Ah-hyun; Lee Chang-woo	Humbler; Kim Ah-hyun; Lee Chang-woo	Gaho	3:30
2.	"Yellow Light" (Inst.)		Humbler; Kim Ah-hyun; Lee Chang-woo		3:30
Total length:					7:00

=== Part 2 ===
Released on June 25, 2023
No.	Title	Lyrics	Music	Artist	Length
1.	"Confess To You"	Park Jeong-jun; Naiv	Park Jeong-jun; Naiv	Lim Kim	3:08
2.	"Confess To You" (Inst.)		Park Jeong-jun; Naiv		3:08
Total length:					6:16

=== Part 3 ===
Released on July 2, 2023
No.	Title	Lyrics	Music	Artist	Length
1.	"Get To You" (너에게 닿을게)	Kim Ah-hyun; Humbler	Humbler	Jung Seung-hwan	3:27
2.	"Get To You" (너에게 닿을게; Inst.)		Humbler		3:27
Total length:					6:54

=== Part 4 ===
Released on July 8, 2023
No.	Title	Lyrics	Music	Artist	Length
1.	"Dive"	LuckyClover (Avec)	LuckyClover (Avec)	Kim Woo-jin	3:39
2.	"Dive" (Inst.)		LuckyClover (Avec)		3:39
Total length:					7:18

=== Part 5 ===
Released on July 9, 2023
No.	Title	Lyrics	Music	Artist	Length
1.	"Keep Me Busy"	Sarah.J; Glody	Sarah.J; Kim Min-cheol; Earn; Glody	Punch	3:32
2.	"Keep Me Busy" (Inst.)		Sarah.J; Kim Min-cheol; Earn; Glody		3:32
Total length:					7:04

=== Part 6 ===
Released on July 15, 2023
No.	Title	Lyrics	Music	Artist	Length
1.	"You Are My" (그대는 나의)	Lee Da-hee	Lee Da-hee	Hynn	3:02
2.	"You Are My" (그대는 나의; Inst.)		Lee Da-hee		3:02
Total length:					6:04

=== Part 7 ===
Released on July 16, 2023
No.	Title	Lyrics	Music	Artist	Length
1.	"Fall in Love"	Yoda; Charles	Kim Se-jin; Hyunki	Jeong Se-woon	3:28
2.	"Fall in Love" (Inst.)		Kim Se-jin; Hyunki		3:28
Total length:					6:56

=== Part 8 ===
Released on July 23, 2023
No.	Title	Lyrics	Music	Artist	Length
1.	"Perhaps Love" (사랑인걸까)	Kim Yeong-seong; Seo Jae-ha	Kim Yeong-seong; Seo Jae-ha	Minseo	3:54
2.	"Perhaps Love" (사랑인걸까; Inst.)		Kim Yeong-seong; Seo Jae-ha		3:54
Total length:					7:48

=== Part 9 ===
Released on July 30, 2023
No.	Title	Lyrics	Music	Artist	Length
1.	"Everyday With You"	Park Ho-kyung	Park Ho-kyung; Baek Chang-jae	KyoungSeo	2:50
2.	"Everyday With You" (Inst.)		Park Ho-kyung; Baek Chang-jae		2:50
Total length:					5:40

== Reception ==
=== Viewership ===
According to U.S. streaming data published by Media Play News using figures from research firm PlumResearch, season one of King the Land generated 3.7 million unique viewers on Netflix during the week of June 26–July 2, 2023.

King the Land : South Korea viewers per episode (millions)

Season	Episode number																Average
Season	1	2	3	4	5	6	7	8	9	10	11	12	13	14	15	16	Average
1	1.119	1.835	2.039	2.331	2.273	2.909	2.521	2.985	2.571	2.616	2.179	2.588	2.318	2.496	2.777	3.404	2.435

Source: Audience measurement performed nationwide by Nielsen Korea.

Average TV viewership ratings
Ep.	Original broadcast date	Average audience share (Nielsen Korea)	
Ep.	Original broadcast date	Nationwide	Seoul
1	June 17, 2023	5.075% (1st)	5.344% (1st)
2	June 18, 2023	7.544% (1st)	8.255% (1st)
3	June 24, 2023	9.145% (1st)	10.671% (1st)
4	June 25, 2023	9.645% (1st)	10.003% (1st)
5	July 1, 2023	9.672% (1st)	10.590% (1st)
6	July 2, 2023	12.017% (1st)	12.607% (1st)
7	July 8, 2023	10.607% (1st)	11.496% (1st)
8	July 9, 2023	12.317% (1st)	13.427% (1st)
9	July 15, 2023	10.196% (1st)	11.174% (1st)
10	July 16, 2023	11.303% (1st)	12.351% (1st)
11	July 22, 2023	9.003% (1st)	10.062% (1st)
12	July 23, 2023	10.977% (1st)	11.552% (1st)
13	July 29, 2023	9.388% (1st)	9.506% (1st)
14	July 30, 2023	10.651% (1st)	10.965% (1st)
15	August 5, 2023	11.943% (1st)	13.583% (1st)
16	August 6, 2023	13.789% (1st)	14.534% (1st)
Average		10.205%	11.008%
In the table above, the blue numbers represent the lowest ratings and the red numbers represent the highest ratings.; This series aired on a cable channel/pay TV which normally has a relatively smaller audience compared to free-to-air TV/public broadcasters (KBS, SBS, MBC, and EBS).

=== Awards and nominations ===
Name of the award ceremony, year presented, category, nominee of the award, and the result of the nomination
Award ceremony	Year	Category	Nominee / Work	Result	Ref.
Asia Artist Awards	2023	Grand Prize (Daesang) – Actor of the Year	Lee Jun-ho	Won	
Asia Artist Awards	2023	Popularity Award (Actor)	Lee Jun-ho	Won	
APAN Star Awards	2023	Best Character	Lee Jun-ho	Won	
APAN Star Awards	2023	Best Couple	Lee Jun-ho and Im Yoon-ah	Won	
APAN Star Awards	2023	Global Star Award	Lee Jun-ho	Won	
APAN Star Awards	2023	Grand Prize (Daesang)	Lee Jun-ho	Won	
APAN Star Awards	2023	Popularity Award (Actor)	Lee Jun-ho	Won	
APAN Star Awards	2023	Popularity Award (Actress)	Im Yoon-ah	Won	
APAN Star Awards	2023	Top Excellence Award, Actor in a Miniseries	Lee Jun-ho	Nominated	
APAN Star Awards	2023	Top Excellence Award, Actress in a Miniseries	Im Yoon-ah	Nominated	
APAN Star Awards	2023	Global Star Award	Im Yoon-ah	Nominated	
Consumer Rights Day KCA Culture & Entertainment Awards	2023	Viewer's Choice – Actor of the Year	Im Yoon-ah	Won	
Consumer Rights Day KCA Culture & Entertainment Awards	2023	Viewer's Choice – Drama of the Year	King the Land	Won	
Fundex Awards	2023	Grand Prize (Daesang)	Lee Jun-ho	Won	
Fundex Awards	2023	Top Excellence Actress (Drama)	Im Yoon-ah	Won	
Korea Communications Commission Broadcasting Awards	2024	Grand Prize	King the Land	Won	
Korea Drama Awards	2023	Best Supporting Actor	Ahn Se-ha	Won	
TVING Awards	2023	Content of the Year – Best 9	King the Land	Won	

== Remake ==
On February 14, 2024, it was reported that King the Land would be reproduced as a Turkish television drama.
