= Bon Appétit, Your Majesty =

2025 South Korean television series

- Promotional poster
- Hangul: 폭군의 셰프
- Lit.: The Tyrant's Chef
- RR: Pokgunui syepeu
- MR: P'okkunŭi syep'ŭ
- Genre: Historical; Fantasy; Romantic; Time travel
- Created by: Jang Kyung-ik (Studio Dragon); Yoo Sang-won; Jang Hyuk-jae
- Based on: Surviving as Yeonsangun's Chef by Park Kook-jae
- Developed by: Studio Dragon
- Written by: fGRD
- Directed by: Jang Tae-yoo
- Starring: Lim Yoona; Lee Chae-min; Kang Han-na; Choi Gwi-hwa
- Music by: Jeon Chang-yeop
- Opening theme: "Bon Appétit, Your Majesty" by: Jeon Chang-yeop; Ahn Su-wan
- Ending theme: "Food Story" by: Jeon Chang-yeop; Kim Hyeon-joon
- Country of origin: South Korea
- Original language: Korean
- No. of episodes: 12

Production
- Executive producers: Lee Hye-young; Lee Young-joon
- Producers: Kim Tae-hoon; Heo Do-yun; Jang Kyung-ik; Yoo Sang-won; Jang Hyuk-jae; Jang Tae-yoo; Lee Sun-hee; Song Jeong-yoon
- Running time: 80 minutes
- Production companies: Film Grida; Jung Universe

Original release
- Network: tvN
- Release: August 23 – September 28, 2025

Bon Appétit, Your Majesty (Korean: 폭군의 셰프 lit: 'Tyrant's Chef') is a 2025 South Korean fantasy romantic television series with elements of time travel and historical fiction. Written by fGRD and directed by Jang Tae-yoo, it stars Lim Yoona, Lee Chae-min, Kang Han-na, and Choi Gwi-hwa. The series follows the story of a South Korean French cuisine chef who, upon reaching the pinnacle of her profession, time-slips to the past and encounters the king, who is regarded as both the best gourmet and the worst tyrant. It aired on tvN from August 23 to September 28, 2025, every Saturday and Sunday at 21:10 (KST). It is also available for streaming on Netflix.

== Synopsis ==
Bon Appétit, Your Majesty follows Yeon Ji-yeong, a modern-day chef who just won a grand prize for Michelin chefs in Paris, who, on her flight back to Seoul, unexpectedly travels back in time to the Joseon dynasty during a solar eclipse. She arrives in the royal court of King Lee Heon, a young monarch burdened by trauma from his mother's death and consumed by revenge against corrupt officials. Mistaken for a suspicious gwinyeo (귀녀, female monster), Ji-yeong is eventually appointed as a Chief Royal Cook after impressing Lee Heon with her innovative cooking, blending modern techniques with traditional ingredients.

As Ji-yeong navigates palace politics, she encounters rivalry from the evil consort Kang Mok-ju and the schemes of Prince Je Seon, who plots to overthrow Lee Heon so he can become the king. Through her dishes, Ji-yeong gradually earns Lee Heon's trust and affection, awakening memories of warmth and comfort from his childhood and challenging his reputation as a cold and tyrannical ruler. The series intertwines romance, comedy, and political intrigue as Ji-yeong struggles to survive, protect those around her, and decide whether to alter history by changing Lee Heon's personality, stopping the Gapsin Purge (when the king executes officials related to his mother's death, followed by a coup d'état and the king getting deposed) or find her way back to 2025, where her father and career await.

== Cast and characters ==
=== Main ===
- Lim Yoona as Yeon Ji-yeong

A South Korean French cuisine chef with a positive but assertive character. She unexpectedly finds herself in the Joseon period on the day she wins the greatest French cooking competition because of her Mangunrok book.

- Lee Chae-min as Lee Heon

The King of Joseon, who is regarded as both the best gourmet and the worst tyrant, later finds himself attracted to Ji-yeong.

- Kang Han-na as Kang Mok-ju

A cruel and scheming woman who has gained Lee Heon's approval and become a long-term concubine. She disposes of other women after taking advantage of them, becomes loyal to Prince Je-Seon for setting her free from jail, and is considered one of the most villainous women in Joseon's history.

- Choi Gwi-hwa as Prince Je Seon

A cunning and manipulative Joseon grand prince. He acts like a bandit to save his life after his father died, but he never stops searching for an opportunity to overthrow Lee Heon and ascend the throne.

=== Supporting ===
Royal Kitchen

- Yoon Seo-ah as Seo Gil-geum (Joseon era) / Seo Sun-geum (2025)

A woman whose house Ji-yeong enters without consent later becomes a palace maid who befriends Ji-yeong.

- Kim Kwang-kyu as Uhm Bong-shik
- Hong Jin-ki as Maeng Man-soo

Ji-yeong's rival in the royal cooks competition later becomes her acquaintance. He initially works for Kang Mok-ju to disrupt and harass Ji-yeong, and eventually stops after Ji-yeong knows that Consort Kang is behind his schemes.

- Kim Hyun-mok as Min Gae-duk

Ji-yeong's rival in the royal cooks competition later becomes her acquaintance.

- Joo Kwang-hyun as Shim Mak-jin

People around Lee Heon

- Lee Joo-ahn as Gong Gil

King Lee Heon's mysterious jester. He attracts everyone's attention as soon as he appears on stage with his handsome appearance and strong physique. He also saves Gil-geum when she is nearly assassinated by Kang Mok-ju's court lady and protects Yeon Ji-yeong. He used to secretly assassinate King Lee Heon because of the allegations that he caused Gong Gil's sister's death, but the actual culprit is Kang Mok-ju.

- Seo Yi-sook as Grand Queen Dowager Inju

The Grand Queen Dowager, who is Lee Heon's paternal grandmother, is responsible for the death of his mother.

- Shin Eun-jung as Queen Dowager Jahyeon

The Queen Dowager. Lee Heon's stepmother.

- Oh Eui-shik as Im Song-jae (Joseon era) / Steve Im (2025)

Grand Royal Secretary, King Lee Heon's loyal minister and acquaintance from childhood. He initially enforces chaehong to force women to enter the palace to serve the king. After King Lee Heon abolishes chaehong, Im Song-jae becomes Ji-yeong's supporter.

- Park Young-woon as Shin Soo-hyuk
- Jang Gwang as Chang Sun
- Park Joon-myun as Choi Mal-im
- Lee Eun-jae as Deposed Queen Yun

Ming Envoy

- Kim Hyung-mook as envoy Yu Kun
- Jo Jae-yoon as cook Tang Bai Long
- Moon Seung-you as cook Ya Fei Xiu

== Episodes ==
No.	Title	Original release date
1	"Course Nº 1 Gochujang Butter Bibimbap"	August 23, 2025
After winning La Poêle d'Or 2025, chef Yeon Ji Yeong plans to return to Korea. During a total solar eclipse, she reads a Joseon-era cookbook on her flight and is mysteriously transported back in time to the royal hunting grounds. There, she encounters King Lee Heon, who mistakes her for a gwinyeo, while she assumes he is an actor. Following an attack on the king, Ji-yeong treats his injuries and takes shelter with him in a house later revealed to belong to Seo Gil Geum. She prepares a dish called “Gochujang Butter Bibimbap,” which reminds the king of his late mother. After Ji-yeong and Gil-geum leave to retrieve her belongings, the king is rescued by his soldiers.
2	"Course N° 2 Sous Vide Cuisine"	August 24, 2025
As Ji-yeong and Gil-geum head towards the cliff where she lost her bag, they are captured by soldiers collecting women for the chaehong and taken to the Governor's house. Ji-yeong makes a deal with the Governor's son to release all captives if she manages to cook a meal that satisfies the Grand Royal Secretary Im Song Jae, who will arrive later. Finding the meat too tough, Ji-yeong uses the "Sous Vide" method to cook the meat and creates a dish garnished with local ingredients. However, Im Song Jae, refuses to even taste the dish until Ji-yeong bets her life on his satisfaction. Song Jae finds the dish delicious, but declares that he is not satisfied and orders Ji-yeong's execution. She is saved when King Lee Heon arrives and tastes the dish himself. He declares that he is satisfied with the dish and orders Ji-yeong and Gil-geum to be taken to the palace with him. It is later revealed that the actual purpose of the chaehong was to punish officials who had a hand in King Lee Heon's mother's death. Ji-yeong and Gil-geum are taken to the palace in chains, where they meet Kang Mok-ju.
3	"Course N° 3 Haute Cuisine"	August 30, 2025
4	"Course N° 4 **** and Spinach Doenjang Soup"	August 31, 2025
5	"Course N° 5 Snowflake Schnitzel"	September 6, 2025
6	"Course N° 6 Black Sesame Macaron"	September 7, 2025
7	"Course N° 7 Dongnae Pajeon on a Rainy Day"	September 13, 2025
8	"Course N° 8 Rice Wine Beef Bourguignon"	September 14, 2025
9	"Course N° 9 Pressure-Cooked Ogyetang"	September 20, 2025
10	"Course N° 10 Joseon Restaurant"	September 21, 2025
11	"Course N° 11 Soy Meat Gujeolpan & Eggplant Pie"	September 27, 2025
At the banquet of the Grand Queen Dowager, the missing inspector Yi Jang-gyun appears with letters proving the conspiracy by her and her court ladies that led to the poisoning of the king's mother's and as further proof brings the maternal grandmother who turned catatonic in despair. She produces a blood-stained garment to convince the king. Enraged, he threatens to kill the Grand Queen Dowager. Yeon Ji Yeong steps in between and confesses her love to prevent him from committing mass murder and turning into a tyrant. Instead, the king orders all gates blocked. Ji Yeong gives the maternal grandmother licorice chocolate, which restores her senses. She tells the king that his mother wanted him to be a wise and virtues ruler while righting the injustice. The king drops his sword. Ji Yeong suspects treachery amidst the unbelievable coincidences and suggests a meal with the Grand Queen Dowager before the rift deepens. Under orders from Grand Prince Jesan, guards try to abduct Ji Yeong, but the Jester Gong-gil rescues her. Jesan’s men blame rebels hiding in the forest, causing the king to ride out to rescue her. In his absence, Jesan, masquerading as the king, kills the Grand Queen Dowager. His Red Band troops slaughter the royal court and trap the king in the forest.
12	"Course N° 12 Hwanseban"	September 28, 2025
While his followers spread lies about King Lee Heon, Grand Prince Jesan convinces the Queen Dowager to elevate the king’s young brother. A bloodied King Heon confronts Jesan in the palace, who sends him into exile. When the guards try to execute King Heon in the forest, his remaining troops free him and together with Jester Gong-gil, Ji Yeong, and the cooking staff set a trap for Jesan. His troops surround Ji Yeong’s outnumbered army, but Chang Sun arrives with hand grenades and turns the tide. Jesan takes Ji Yeong hostage and flees with her. The king’s troops take back the palace, leading to the deaths of the rebel leaders including Consort Kang Mok-ju. Jesan and his three bodyguards fight it out with the king, who drops the magical Mangunrok cookbook. Ji Yeong cuts her ropes, and throws herself between the king and Jesan, who severely wounds her. The king kills him, then cries over his love. A storm rolls in during a lunar eclipse. Light from the book carries Ji Yeong away. She awakes in a modern hospital to find a blood-stained Mangunrok in her bag. At her new job at the restaurant, the cooking staff look exactly like those from Joseon. King Heon walks in and insists she taste his dinner first.

== Production ==
=== Development ===
Bon Appétit, Your Majesty is directed by Jang Tae-yoo, written by fGRD, planned by Studio Dragon, and Film Grida and Jung Universe co-managed the production. The series is based on the novel '연산군의 셰프로 살아남기' (Surviving as Yeonsangun's Chef) by Park Kook-jae, which draws inspiration from the end of King Yeonsangun of Joseon's reign and the Kapja Sahwa (second purge of the literati) in 1504.

=== Casting ===
On September 24, 2024, Lim Yoona was reported to be under consideration for the female lead, marking her first collaboration with director Jang Tae-yoo. On January 2, 2025, Kang Han-na finalized negotiations to appear in the drama.

Park Sung-hoon was in talks for the male main role, but tvN reported that his script-reading was cancelled due to a controversial social media post. On January 13, The Korea Times reported that Park had officially stepped down from the series. At the same time, Lee Chae-min was considered as his replacement. On January 21, Choi Gwi-hwa was added to the cast, and the principal lineup of actors, including Lim, Lee, Kang, and Choi, was finalized and confirmed on January 24.

On June 25, 2025, 9ato Entertainment announced that Yoon Seo-ah would appear as Seo Gil-geum, a palace maid who befriends Yeon Ji-yeong.

=== Filming ===
According to IZE, filming began on January 23, 2025.

== Release ==
Bon Appetit, Your Majesty premiered on tvN on August 23, 2025, and aired every Saturday and Sunday at 21:10 (KST) through September 28. It is also available for streaming on Netflix.

== Original soundtrack ==
Bon Appétit, Your Majesty

Soundtrack album by various artists
- Languages: Korean; English
- Labels: Jung Universe; Studio Dragon
- Producer: LuckyClover

The Bon Appétit, Your Majesty original soundtrack produced by LuckyClover was released gradually from August 24, 2025 to September 28, 2025, by Studio Jung Universe and Studio Dragon.

Part 1

Released on August 24, 2025
No.	Title	Lyrics	Music	Artist	Length
1.	"I Find You"	Song Jung-yoon; LuckyClover	LuckyClover	Doyoung	3:29
2.	"I Find You" (Instrumental)		LuckyClover		3:29
Total length:					6:58

Part 2

Released on August 31, 2025
No.	Title	Lyrics	Music	Artist	Length
1.	"Stay with Me"	Bumho; Song Jung-yoon; LuckyClover	LuckyClover	Huh Gak	3:55
2.	"Stay with Me" (Instrumental)		LuckyClover		3:55
Total length:					7:50

Part 3

Released on September 7, 2025
No.	Title	Lyrics	Music	Artist	Length
1.	"By Chance, By Fate"	1DB; Song Jung-yoon; LuckyClover	LuckyClover	Kim Young-woo	3:09
2.	"By Chance, By Fate" (Instrumental)		LuckyClover		3:09
Total length:					6:18

Part 4

Released on September 14, 2025
No.	Title	Lyrics	Music	Artist	Length
1.	"Kung"	1DB; Song Jung-yoon; LuckyClover	LuckyClover	Seo Da-hyun	3:57
2.	"Kung" (Instrumental)		LuckyClover		3:57
Total length:					7:54

Part 5

Released on September 14, 2025
No.	Title	Lyrics	Music	Artist	Length
1.	"Land of the Morning"	Song Jung-yoon; LuckyClover	LuckyClover	La Poem	3:07
2.	"Land of the Morning" (Instrumental)		LuckyClover		3:07
Total length:					6:14

Part 6

Released on September 21, 2025
No.	Title	Lyrics	Music	Artist	Length
1.	"Falling Night"	Song Jung-yoon; LuckyClover	LuckyClover	Seung Hee	4:20
2.	"Falling Night" (Instrumental)		LuckyClover		4:20
Total length:					8:40

Part 7

Released on September 28, 2025
No.	Title	Lyrics	Music	Artist	Length
1.	"I Will Let Go"	Song Jung-yoon; LuckyClover	LuckyClover	Jang Min-ho	4:35
2.	"I Will Let Go" (Instrumental)		LuckyClover		4:35
Total length:					9:10

== Reception ==
=== Critical response ===
On Rotten Tomatoes, 80% of 5 reviews by critics are positive. According to FlixPatrol, a global OTT ranking site, the series ranked third worldwide and reached the top position on Netflix in 23 countries.

Bon Appétit, Your Majesty ranked fourth in Netflix's Global Top 10 TV (Non-English) category two days after its release and entered the top 10 in 93 countries and regions, with 9.4 million hours watched by 3.5 million viewers in its first week. It remained on the chart as No. 2 for its second and third week, respectively. It recorded 43 million hours watched by 8.1 million viewers for its second week. On its fourth and fifth week, the series ranked topped the chart for 2 consecutive weeks.

On October 21, 2025, Netflix identified the series as one of its hit titles in its third-quarter of 2025 earnings report. In the same day, the cast and crew had a vacation to Da Nang, Vietnam to celebrate the drama's widespread success.

On November 6, 2025, Studio Dragon cited the series as one of the works that contributed to its return to profitability in the third quarter of 2025.

=== Viewership ===
Bon Appétit, Your Majesty : South Korea viewers per episode (millions)

Season	Episode number												Average
Season	1	2	3	4	5	6	7	8	9	10	11	12	Average
1	1.173	1.656	1.946	2.873	2.662	3.260	3.104	3.865	3.297	3.813	2.950	4.213	2.901

Source: Audience measurement performed nationwide by Nielsen Korea.

Average TV viewership ratings
Ep.	Original broadcast date	Average audience share (Nielsen Korea)	
Ep.	Original broadcast date	Nationwide	Seoul
1	August 23, 2025	4.856% (1st)	5.101% (1st)
2	August 24, 2025	6.642% (1st)	6.506% (1st)
3	August 30, 2025	7.589% (1st)	7.172% (1st)
4	August 31, 2025	11.063% (1st)	11.419% (1st)
5	September 6, 2025	10.818% (1st)	11.646% (1st)
6	September 7, 2025	12.742% (1st)	13.135% (1st)
7	September 13, 2025	12.647% (1st)	12.828% (1st)
8	September 14, 2025	15.405% (1st)	15.815% (1st)
9	September 20, 2025	13.463% (1st)	14.222% (1st)
10	September 21, 2025	15.750% (1st)	15.942% (1st)
11	September 27, 2025	12.393% (1st)	11.848% (1st)
12	September 28, 2025	17.107% (1st)	17.407% (1st)
Average		11.706%	12.253%
Special	August 16, 2025	1.562% (6th)	1.862% (2nd)
Special	October 4, 2025	2.087% (2nd)	1.874% (2nd)
In the table above, the blue numbers represent the lowest ratings and the red numbers represent the highest ratings.; This series aired on a cable channel/pay TV, which normally has a relatively smaller audience compared to free-to-air TV/public broadcasters (KBS, SBS, MBC, and EBS).

=== Accolades ===
Accolades received by Bon Appétit, Your Majesty
Award ceremony	Year	Category	Nominee / Work	Result	Ref.
Asian Academy Creative Awards	2026	Best Drama Series	Bon Appétit, Your Majesty	Pending	
APAN Star Awards	2025	Drama of the Year	Bon Appétit, Your Majesty	Nominated	
APAN Star Awards	2025	Best Director	Jang Tae-yoo	Nominated	
APAN Star Awards	2025	Top Excellence Award, Actress in a Miniseries	Lim Yoona	Nominated	
APAN Star Awards	2025	Popularity Star Award – Actress	Lim Yoona	Nominated	
APAN Star Awards	2025	Global Star Award	Lim Yoona	Nominated	
APAN Star Awards	2025	Global Star Award	Lee Chae-min	Nominated	
APAN Star Awards	2025	Best New Actor	Lee Chae-min	Won	
APAN Star Awards	2025	Popularity Star Award – Actor	Lee Chae-min	Nominated	
APAN Star Awards	2025	Best New Actress	Yoon Seo-ah	Nominated	
APAN Star Awards	2025	Best Couple Award	Lim Yoona and Lee Chae-min	Nominated	
Asia Artist Awards	2025	Actress of The Year – TV	Lim Yoona	Won	
Asia Artist Awards	2025	Best Artist – Actor	Lim Yoona	Won	
Asia Artist Awards	2025	Asia Star Awards	Lim Yoona	Won	
Asia Star Entertainer Awards	2026	Best Character – Actor	Lee Chae-min	Won	
Asia Star Entertainer Awards	2026	Best Artist – Actor	Lee Chae-min	Nominated	
Asia Star Entertainer Awards	2026	Fan Choice – Actor / Actress	Lee Chae-min	Nominated	
Asia Star Entertainer Awards	2026	Fan Choice – Actor / Actress	Lim Yoona	Nominated	
Asia Star Entertainer Awards	2026	Best Artist – Actress	Lim Yoona	Nominated	
Asia Star Entertainer Awards	2026	Fan Choice – Couple	Lim Yoona and Lee Chae-min	Won	
Asian Pop Music Awards	2025	Best OST	Doyoung (for "I Found You")	Nominated	
Asian Television Awards	2026	Best Drama Series	Bon Appétit, Your Majesty	Pending	
C21 International Drama Awards	2025	Best Comedy-Drama Series	Bon Appétit, Your Majesty	Nominated	
Baeksang Arts Awards	2026	Best Drama	Bon Appétit, Your Majesty	Nominated	
Baeksang Arts Awards	2026	Best Actress	Lim Yoona	Nominated	
Baeksang Arts Awards	2026	Best New Actor	Lee Chae-min	Won	
Banff Rockie Awards	2026	Drama Series: Non-English Language	Bon Appétit, Your Majesty	Nominated	
Brand Customer Loyalty Awards	2026	Best Actress – TV Drama	Lim Yoona	Won	
Fundex Awards	2025	Best TV Drama	Bon Appétit, Your Majesty	Won	
Fundex Awards	2025	Best Actor – TV Drama	Lee Chae-min	Nominated	
Fundex Awards	2025	Popular Star Prize – K-Drama Actor	Lee Chae-min	Nominated	
Fundex Awards	2025	Best Actress – TV Drama	Lim Yoona	Nominated	
Fundex Awards	2025	Popular Star Prize – K-Drama Actress	Lim Yoona	Won	
Hanteo Music Awards	2026	Special Award – OST	Doyoung (for "I Found You")	Nominated	
Institute of National Brand Promotion (Note: Honors are given at the National Brand Awards, to acknowledge individuals and businesses who make an exceptional contribution to raising South Korea's brand image.)	2025	National Brand Award Grand Prize – Culture Sector	Lim Yoona	Won	
Korea Cable TV Awards	2026	Grand Prize – Drama	Bon Appétit, Your Majesty	Won	
Korea Drama Awards	2026	Best Drama	Bon Appétit, Your Majesty	Pending	
Korea Drama Awards	2026	Top Excellence Award, Actress	Lim Yoona	Pending	
Korea Drama Awards	2026	Excellence Award, Actor	Lee Chae-min	Pending	
Korea First Brand Awards	2026	Best Actress – Drama	Lim Yoona	Won	
Korea First Brand Awards	2026	Best Actress (Indonesia's Choice)	Lim Yoona	Won	
Korea First Brand Awards	2026	Best Actress (Vietnam's Choice)	Lim Yoona	Won	
Korea First Brand Awards	2026	Best Actor – Hot Trend	Lee Chae-min	Won	
Korea First Brand Awards	2026	Best Actor – Rising Star (Indonesia)	Lee Chae-min	Won	
SEC Awards	2026	Best Asian Series	Bon Appétit, Your Majesty	Nominated	
Seoul International Drama Awards	2026	Outstanding Asian Star: Korea Popularity Award	Lim Yoona	Pending	
Seoul International Drama Awards	2026	Best OST	Doyoung (for "I Found You")	Pending	
Seoul Music Awards	2026	OST Award	Jang Minho (for "I Will Let Go")	Nominated	
Visionary Awards (Note: Visionary Awards, which started in 2020, selects and awards people who lead roles in the Korean entertainment industry. It highlights the meaning and achievements of a person whose chosen trend keywords penetrated the entertainment industry, including broadcasting, movies, music, and performances, and presents the next vision of the cultural sector with outstanding achievements and influence.)	2026	2026 Visionary	Jang Tae-yoo, Lim Yoona, and Lee Chae-min	Won	

== Future ==
In August 2026, media reports emerged regarding a follow-up series in development set in the same fictional universe, featuring a new storyline and a cast led by Cha Eun-woo.
