= Lee Chae-min =

South Korean actor (born 2000)

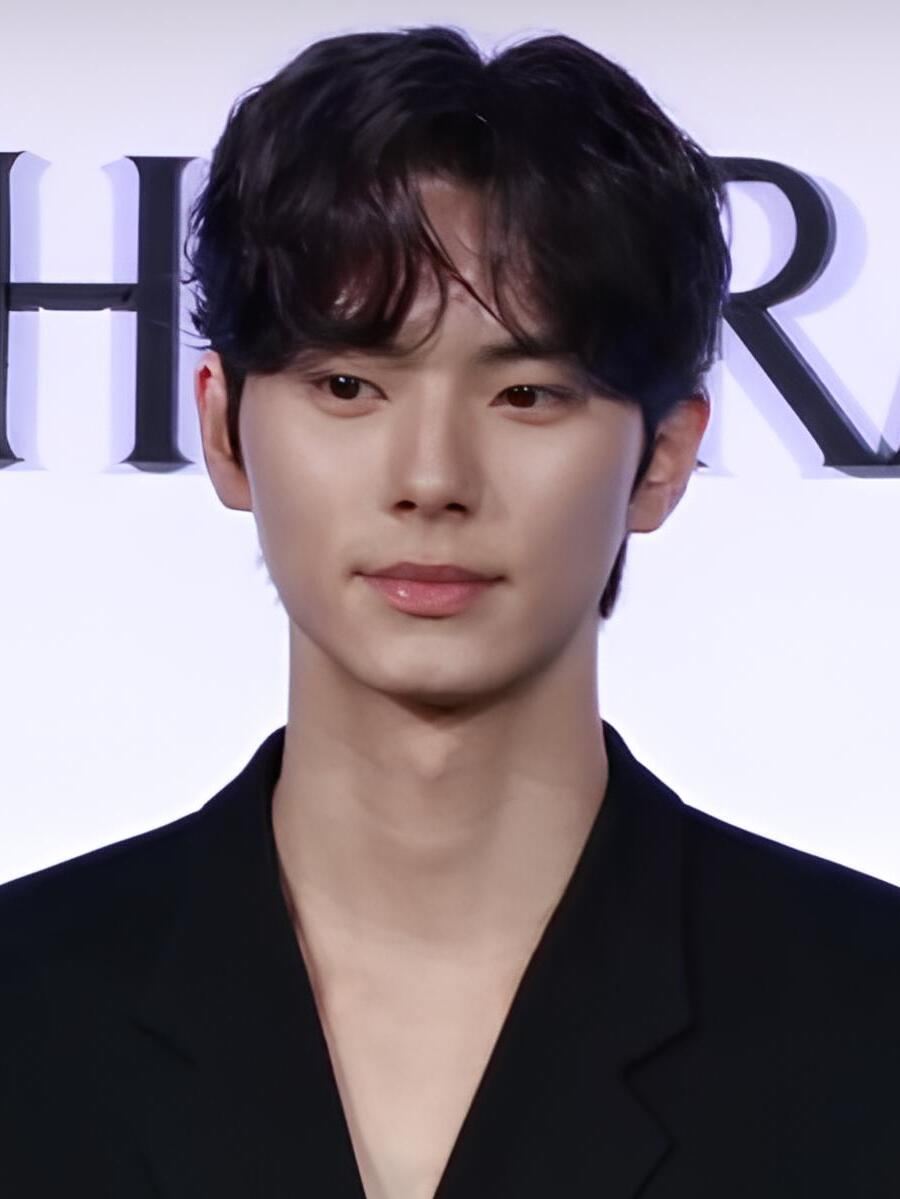
- Lee in June 2024
- Born: September 15, 2000 (age 26); Goyang, South Korea
- Education: Korea National University of Arts
- Occupations: Actor; host
- Years active: 2021–present
- Agent: Varo Entertainment

Korean name
- Hangul: 이채민
- RR: I Chaemin
- MR: I Ch'aemin

Lee Chae-min (Korean: 이채민; born September 15, 2000) is a South Korean actor. He appeared in the television series High Class (2021), Love All Play (2022), Crash Course in Romance (2023), and Bon Appétit, Your Majesty (2025). He hosted the KBS music program Music Bank from September 2022 to May 2024.

== Personal life ==
In March 2024, it was revealed that Lee is in a relationship with actress Ryu Da-in. The two met on the set of Crash Course in Romance (2023).

== Filmography ==
=== Film ===
Year	Title	Role	Ref.
2026	Everyday We Are	Oh Ho-soo	

=== Television series ===
Year	Title	Role	Notes	Ref.
2021	High Class	Ahn Seung-jo		
2022	Love All Play	Lee Ji-ho		
2022	Alchemy of Souls: Light and Shadow	Liquor merchant	Cameo (Episode 1)	
2023	Crash Course in Romance	Lee Seon-jae		
2023	See You in My 19th Life	Kang Min-ki		
2024	Hierarchy	Kang Ha	Netflix original series	
2025	Crushology 101	Hwang Jae-yeol		
2025	Bon Appétit, Your Majesty	King Lee Heon		
2025	Cashero	Jo Nathan	Netflix original series	

=== Television show ===
Year	Title	Role	Ref.
2022–2024	Music Bank	Host	
2026	Take a Hike!	Cast member	

== Accolades ==
=== Awards and nominations ===
Name of the award ceremony, year presented, category, nominee of the award, and the result of the nomination
Award ceremony	Year	Category	Nominee / Work	Result	Ref.
APAN Star Awards	2025	Best New Actor	Bon Appétit, Your Majesty; Crushology 101	Won	
APAN Star Awards	2025	Best Couple Award	Lee Chae-min (with Im Yoon-ah); Bon Appétit, Your Majesty	Nominated	
Asia Star Entertainer Awards	2026	Best Character – Actor	Lee Chae-min	Won	
Asia Star Entertainer Awards	2026	Best Artist – Actor	Lee Chae-min	Nominated	
Asia Star Entertainer Awards	2026	Fan Choice – Actor	Lee Chae-min	Nominated	
Asia Star Entertainer Awards	2026	Fan Choice Couple	Lee Chae-min (with Lim Yoona); Bon Appétit, Your Majesty	Won	
Baeksang Arts Awards	2026	Best New Actor – Television	Bon Appétit, Your Majesty	Won	
Brand Customer Loyalty Awards	2023	Most Influential New Actor	Crash Course in Romance	Won	
KBS Entertainment Awards	2023	Best Couple Award	Lee Chae-min (with Hong Eun-chae); Music Bank	Won	
Korea First Brand Awards	2026	Actor – Hot Trend	Lee Chae-min	Won	
Korea First Brand Awards	2026	Actor – Rising Star (Indonesia)	Lee Chae-min	Won	
MBC Drama Awards	2025	Best New Actor	Crushology 101	Won	
MBC Drama Awards	2025	Best Couple Award	Lee Chae-min (with Roh Jeong-eui); Crushology 101	Nominated	
Visionary Awards	2026	2026 Visionary	Lee Chae-min	Won	

=== Listicles ===
Name of publisher, year listed, name of listicle, and placement
Publisher	Year	Listicle	Placement	Ref.
Forbes Korea	2026	Forbes Korea 30 Under 30	Included	
