= Hyori's Homestay =

South Korean TV series

- Promotional poster
- Hangul: 효리네 민박
- RR: Hyorine minbak
- MR: Hyorine minbak
- Genre: Reality; Variety
- Directed by: Jung Hyo-min; Ma Geon-young; Kang Mi-so; Kim Hak-min; Park Ji-ae; Kim Soo-jin; Park Sung-hwan; Ha Na-ryong; Kim Ji-yoon; Park In-ho
- Starring: Lee Hyori; Lee Sang-soon
- Country of origin: South Korea
- Original language: Korean
- No. of seasons: 2
- No. of episodes: 30

Production
- Executive producer: Yoon Hyun-joon
- Production location: South Korea
- Running time: 100 minutes
- Production company: S.M. C&C

Original release
- Network: JTBC
- Release: June 25, 2017 – May 20, 2018

Hyori's Homestay (Korean: 효리네 민박; lit. 'Hyori's Bed and Breakfast') is a South Korean television program starring celebrity couple Lee Hyori and Lee Sang-soon. It aired on JTBC on Sundays at 20:50 (KST); the first episode aired on June 25, 2017. The show is set at the residence of Hyo-ri and Lee Sang-soon in Jeju Island, where they opened a B&B.

== Cast ==
=== Main ===
- Lee Hyori
- Lee Sang-soon

=== Employees ===
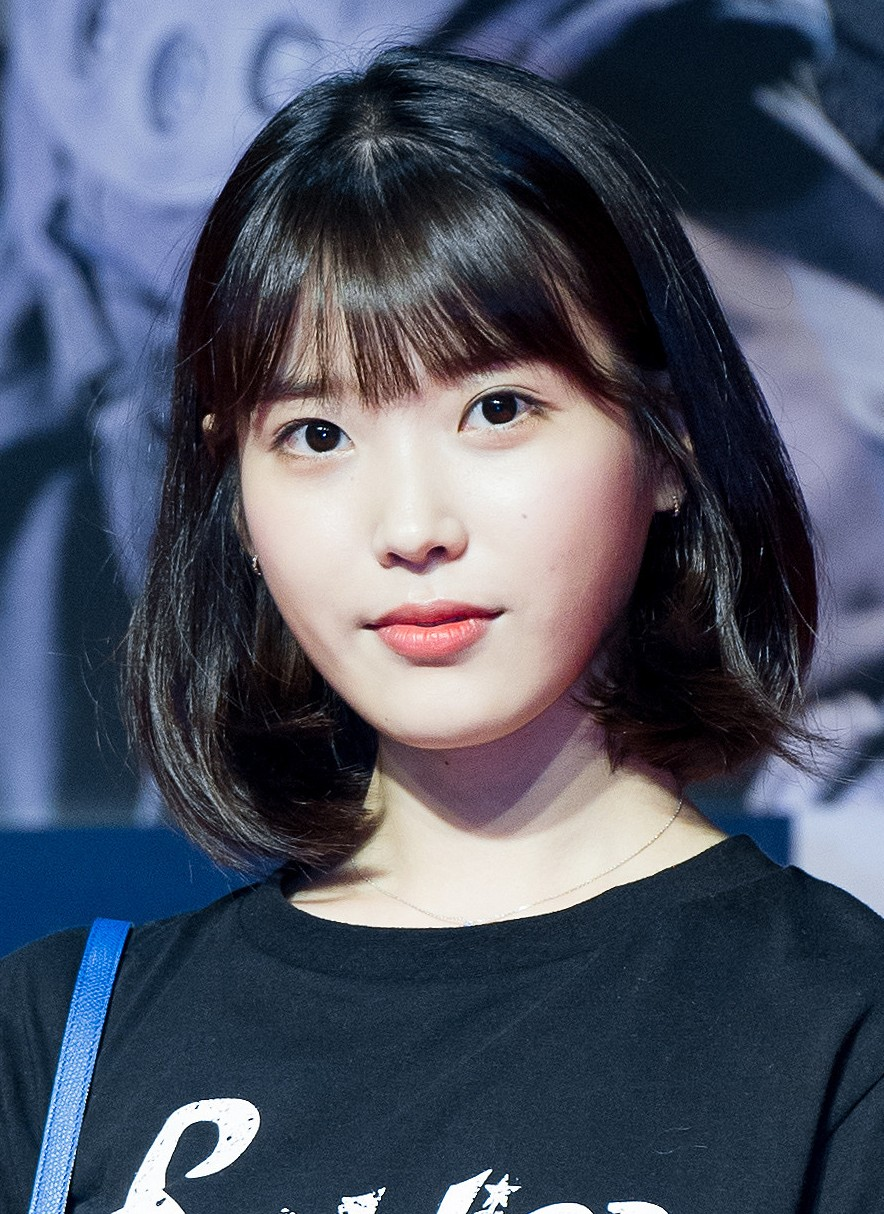
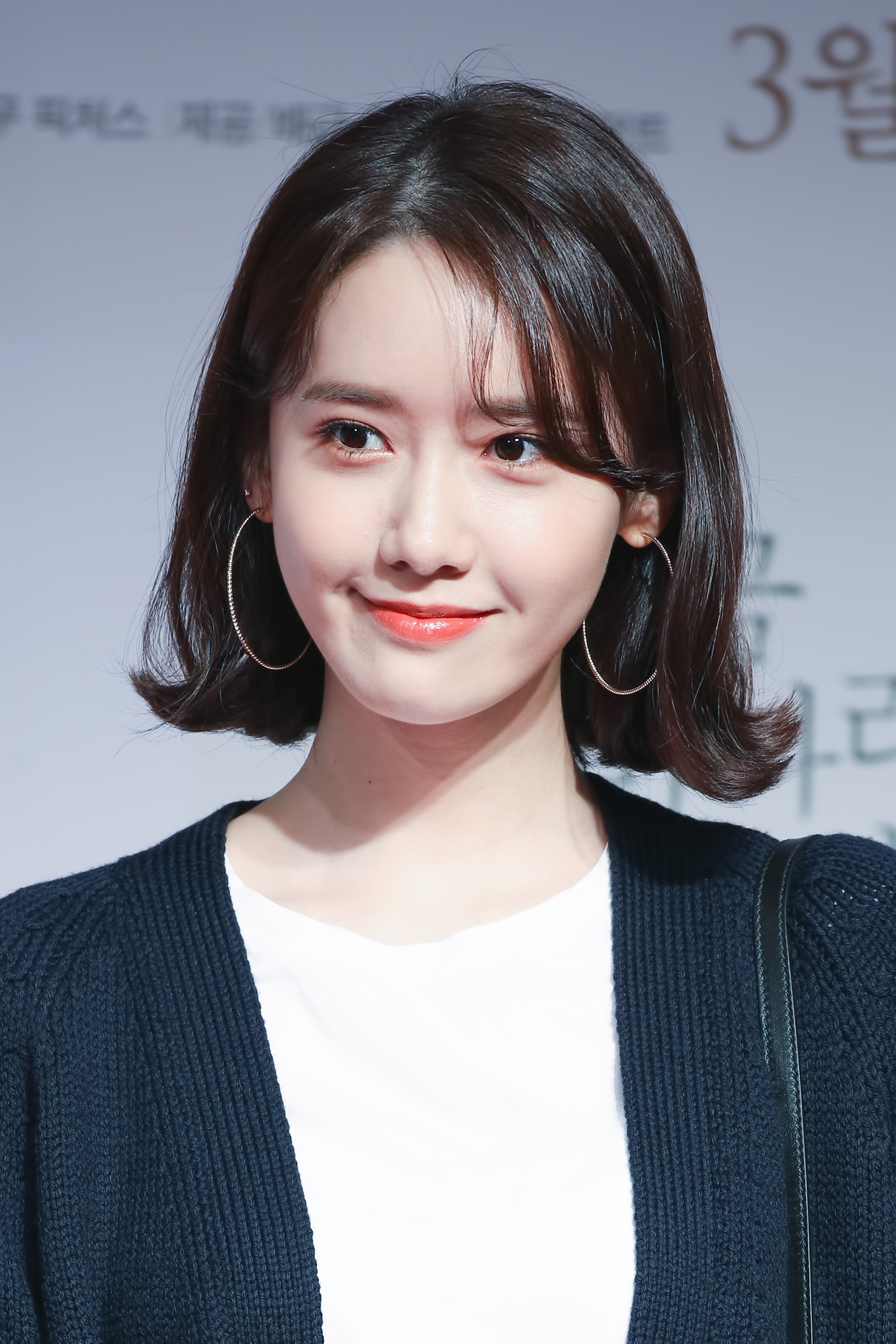
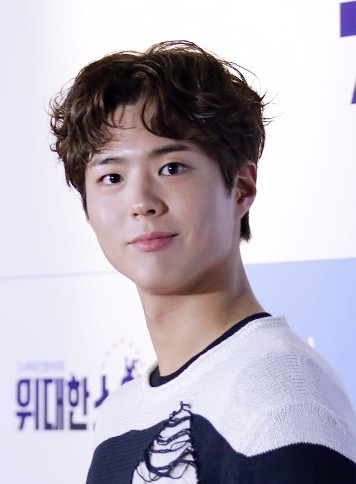
Left to right: IU, Im Yoon-ah, and Park Bo-gum worked as employees for the homestay

==== Season 1 ====
- IU

==== Season 2 ====
- Im Yoon-ah
- Park Bo-gum (Part-time)

=== Guests ===
Season 1
Guests	Episode #
Gimhae Girls	1 – 3
The Explorers	2 – 8
Seoul Siblings	4 – 7
Haman Elder Couple	3 – 6
Wangsimni Flower Boys	5 – 8
Seoul Sisters	6 – 8
Seongnam Couple	8 – 10
Jung Dami	9 – 10
Daegu Coworkers	10 – 12
The Police Women	11 – 12
Music Major Students	12 – 13
Incheon Twins	12 – 14
Long Distance Couple	12 – 14

Season 2
Guests	Episode #
The Judo Quintet	2 – 5
Yeon Sisters	3 – 5
Surfer Team	3 – 8
Backpacker Team	5 – 10
Daejeon Fin.K.L	6 – 8
Surgery Team	6 – 8
Father and Son	8 – 11
Wedding Photography Couple	8 – 11
Highschool-friend Soldiers	10 – 11
First Foreigner (First guests of season 2.5, the Spring edition)	12 – 15
Motorbike Duo	12 – 15
15-years Female Friend Couple	14 – 15
Four-members Family	14 – 15

== Ratings ==
In the ratings below, the highest rating for the show will be in red, and the lowest rating for the show will be in blue.

=== Season 1 ===
Ep.	Broadcast date	AGB Nielsen Korea	
Ep.	Broadcast date	Nationwide	Seoul
1	June 25, 2017	5.842%	6.391%
2	July 2, 2017	6.186%	7.250%
3	July 9, 2017	6.984%	8.109%
4	July 16, 2017	6.745%	7.581%
5	July 23, 2017	7.211%	8.035%
6	July 30, 2017	6.172%	6.439%
7	August 6, 2017	7.508%	8.641%
8	August 13, 2017	7.496%	8.134%
9	August 20, 2017	9.995%	11.055%
10	August 27, 2017	7.820%	8.192%
11	September 3, 2017	8.155%	8.893%
12	September 10, 2017	8.448%	9.798%
13	September 17, 2017	8.147%	9.178%
14 (Special)	September 24, 2017	8.080%	9.523%

- Episode 9 broke the record set by any JTBC variety program. At the time, it was the highest-rated variety show episode of its network JTBC.

=== Season 2 ===
Ep.	Broadcast date	AGB Nielsen Korea	
Ep.	Broadcast date	Nationwide	Seoul
1	February 4, 2018	8.016%	9.116%
2	February 11, 2018	7.726%	8.988%
3	February 18, 2018	4.669%	5.195%
4	February 25, 2018	6.718%	7.570%
5	March 4, 2018	7.142%	8.129%
6	March 11, 2018	9.157%	11.156%
7	March 18, 2018	10.750%	12.162%
8	March 25, 2018	8.329%	10.173%
9	April 1, 2018	7.178%	8.674%
10	April 8, 2018	7.395%	8.940%
11	April 15, 2018	6.543%	7.341%
12	April 22, 2018	6.929%	7.625%
13	April 29, 2018	5.770%	6.367%
14	May 6, 2018	5.871%	6.247%
15	May 13, 2018	5.621%	6.001%
16 (special)	May 20, 2018	3.417%	3.957%

- Episode 6 marks Park Bo-gum's arrival as part-time worker. At the time, it is the highest-rated variety show episode of its network JTBC.
- Episode 7 overtook episode 6's record and received double-digit ratings. It registered the highest audience share for both seasons of the show. Chief Producer Yoon Hyun-joon stated, "I cannot deny that there is a "Park Bo-gum effect" on the ratings."

== Awards and nominations ==
Year	Award	Category	Recipient	Result	Ref.
2018	54th Baeksang Arts Awards	Best Entertainment Program	Hyori's Homestay	Won	
