= Lim Yoona =

South Korean singer and actress (born 1990)

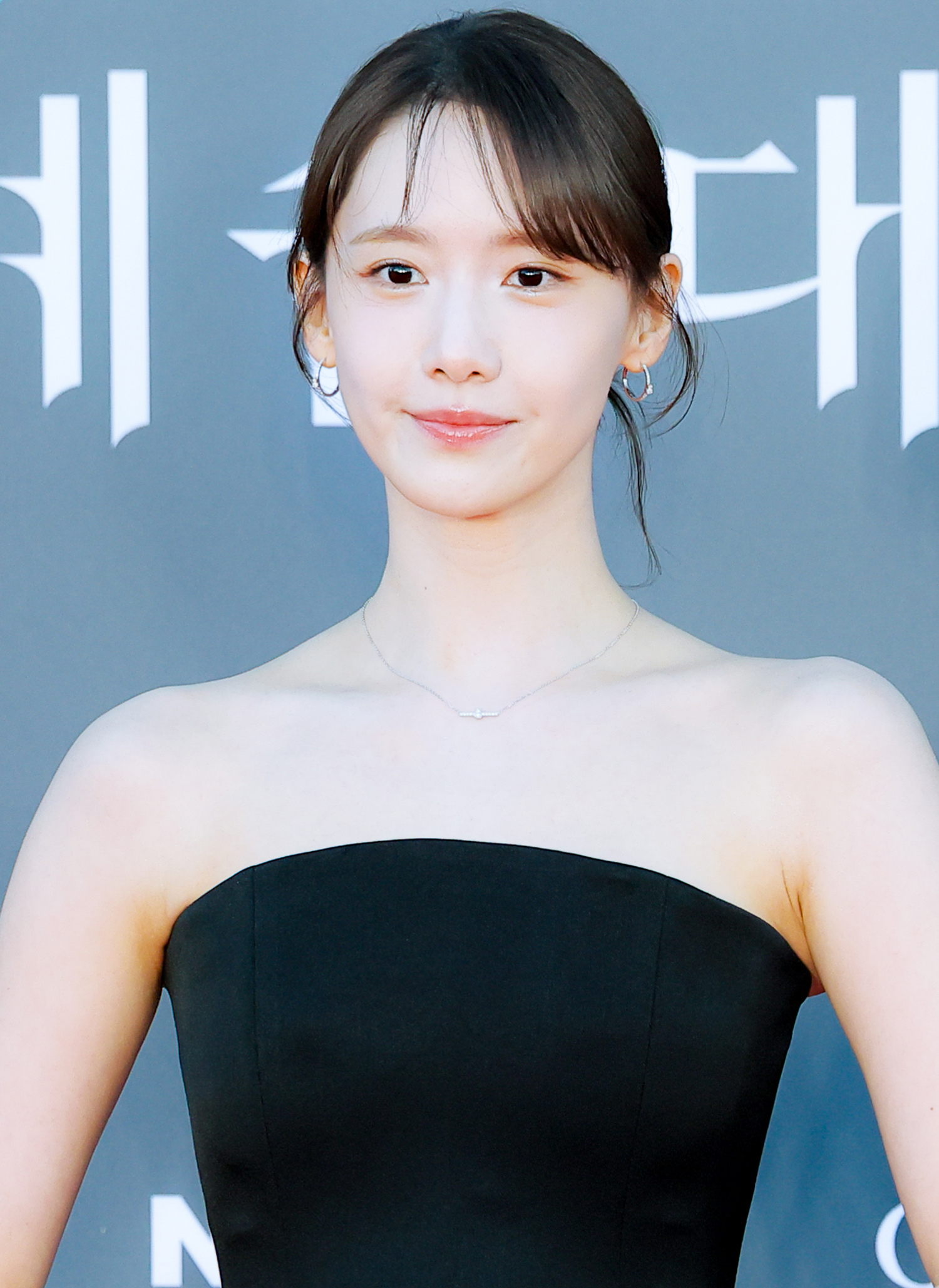
- Lim in 2026
- Born: May 30, 1990 (age 36); Seoul, South Korea
- Education: Dongguk University (Theatre studies)
- Occupations: Singer; actress
- Years active: 2007–present
- Musical career
- Genre: K-pop
- Instrument: Vocals
- Label: SM
- Member of: Girls' Generation; Girls' Generation-Oh!GG; SM Town
- Website: Official website

Korean name
- Hangul: 임윤아
- RR: Im Yuna
- MR: Im Yuna

Signature
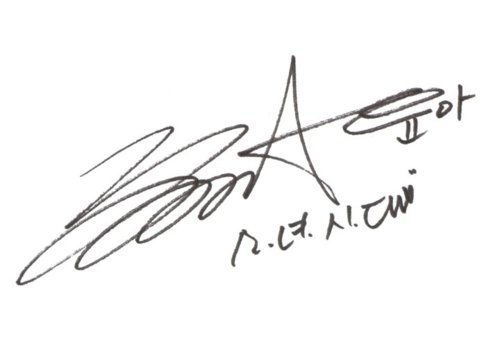

Lim Yoona (Korean: 임윤아; born May 30, 1990), also known mononymously as Yoona, is a South Korean singer and actress. After training for five years, she debuted as a member of girl group Girls' Generation (and later its subgroup Girls' Generation-Oh!GG) in August 2007, which went on to become one of the best-selling artists in South Korea and one of South Korea's most widely known girl groups worldwide. Apart from her group's activities, Lim has participated in various television dramas, notably You Are My Destiny (2008), which marked her career breakthrough and earned her the Best New Actress award at the 45th Baeksang Arts Awards.

Lim has since achieved further public attention and acting acclaim with a variety of role-types in The K2 (2016), Big Mouth (2022), and King the Land (2023). Her film work includes Confidential Assignment (2017), Exit (2019), her first leading role, and Confidential Assignment 2: International (2022), all of which are among the highest-grossing films in South Korea. On May 30, 2019, Lim released her debut extended play A Walk to Remember, charting at number three on South Korea's Gaon Album Chart. In 2025, Lim starred in the wildly popular Bon Appétit, Your Majesty, where she was cast as a three star Michelin chef who was transported back in time to become the chief royal cook for a Joseon king.

The success of Lim's music and acting careers have led her to various CF deals, notably long-term collaborator Innisfree, and have established her as a top idol-actress of Hallyu.

== Early life and education ==
Lim was born on May 30, 1990, in Daerim-dong, Yeongdeungpo District, Seoul, South Korea. Her family consists of her father and an older sister by five years.

Lim graduated from Daeyoung High School in 2009. She went on to major in theater studies and graduated from Dongguk University in February 2015, receiving a lifetime achievement award at the graduation ceremony. Her fellow Girls' Generation member, Seohyun, attended the same university. She was also chosen as an ambassador for the university in 2014, alongside Apink's Naeun and actress Park Ha-sun.

== Career ==
=== 2002–2004: Pre-debut activities ===
In 2002, she was cast in the SM Saturday Open Casting Audition and spent five years "doing nothing but constant training" in singing, dancing and acting. Prior to debuting, Lim was introduced to the public through various appearances in music videos and commercials; she first appeared in TVXQ's "Magic Castle" music video in December 2004.

=== 2007–2015: Debut with Girls' Generation and acting career ===
She made her official debut as a member of Girls' Generation in August 2007, becoming the "center" of the group. Apart from Girls' Generation's activities, Lim has acted in several television dramas. Her acting career began in 2007 with a minor role in MBC's drama Two Outs in the Ninth Inning. She then appeared in MBC's Woman of Matchless Beauty (2008), and was complimented by veteran actress Bae Jong-ok for her cameo performance.

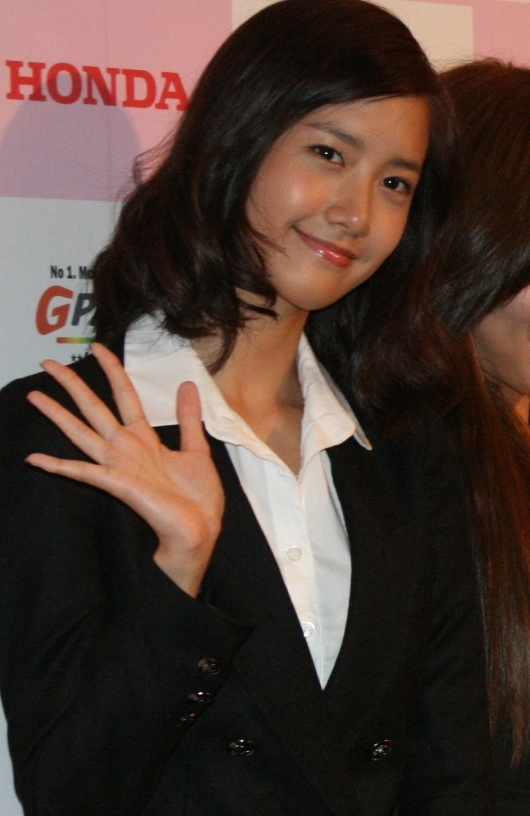
Lim in 2008

In May 2008, Lim was cast her first leading role in KBS's drama You Are My Destiny, playing the character Jang Sae-byuk. The drama achieved viewer ratings of up to 41.5%, and Lim received wider public recognition. She considered the role a turning point in her career, and won two "Best New Actress" awards at the 2008 KBS Drama Awards and 45th Baeksang Arts Awards.

In 2009, Lim was cast in MBC's drama Cinderella Man along with Kwon Sang-woo.

In March 2012, Lim was cast in a lead role alongside Jang Geun Suk in KBS2's drama Love Rain, a fantasy drama about fate where the offspring of an ill-fated couple who met in the 1970s, meet and fall in love with each other in the modern era. Lim played two characters: Yun-hee of the 70s and Ha-na of modern times. Although the drama scored low domestic viewership and was criticized for its failure to relate to the viewers, Lim's acting received positive reviews. Yoon Ga-ee of OSEN wrote: "The speed at which her acting is improving is blinding. She has matured to the point where you want to ask, 'When did her acting get so good?' The criticism that trailed behind her during Cinderella Man is now nowhere to be found". Choi In-kyung of Hankook Ilbo said her acting was continuously improving and "Yoona is completely immersed in her character and has now become 'Hana' herself". The drama garnered much positive overseas interest and was sold to Japan for $10 million, the second highest price for a KBS drama at the time, partly due to Lim's popularity.

In December 2013, Lim starred alongside Lee Beom-soo in KBS2's romantic comedy drama Prime Minister & I. Loosely based on the musical film The Sound of Music, Lim played Nam Da-jung, a young and stubborn reporter who falls in love with the prime minister. The drama received low ratings but Lim's performance was praised and she won an Excellence Award at the 2013 KBS Drama Awards for the role.

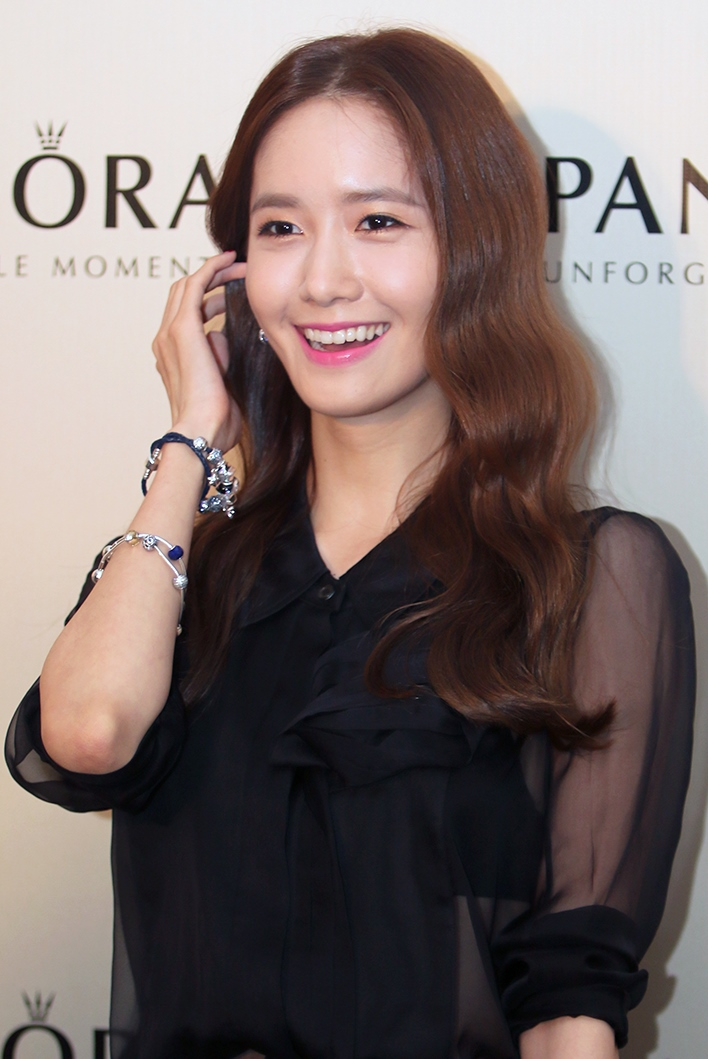
Lim in 2014

In March 2016, Lim released her first solo single "Deoksugung Stonewall Walkway", a collaboration with the South Korean indie group 10cm, as part of SM Station. The urban-pop song peaked at number 24 on Gaon Digital Chart. Fuse described it as "breezy and easy-listening" and complimented how "lovely" Lim delivered the song.

=== 2016–present: Transitioning roles and solo debut ===
In April 2016, Lim was cast in her debut Chinese drama God of War, Zhao Yun, based on the Chinese novel Romance of the Three Kingdoms. She played dual roles–one falls in love with the male lead character but later finds out he killed her father while the other is skilled in martial arts. The drama's viewership ratings peaked at more than 2%, which was described to be "a huge success" relative to China's large population. It also recorded more than 10 billion hits through various online videos sites, reflecting Lim's popularity in China. Following the success, in August 2016, Lim released a Chinese digital mini-album titled Blossom, which contains her renditions of well-known Mandarin songs.

In September 2016, Lim starred in tvN's action thriller The K2. Tired of being typecast with a candy-like image and having always been burdened by the idol-actress prejudice, Lim cast away the public perception and focused on the role as her "personal challenge". Her effort gained positive viewers' recognition, and earned her acting acclaim from critics.

In January 2017, Lim made her film debut in action film, Confidential Assignment. Lim performance was well-received, and she won several awards such as the AFA Next Generation Award at the Asian Film Awards and the Newcomer Award at the Korean Film Shining Star Awards. She then starred in MBC's historical drama The King in Love, an adaptation of the novel of the same name by Kim Yi-ryung. In September 2017, Lim released her second solo single "When The Wind Blows" as part of SM Station.

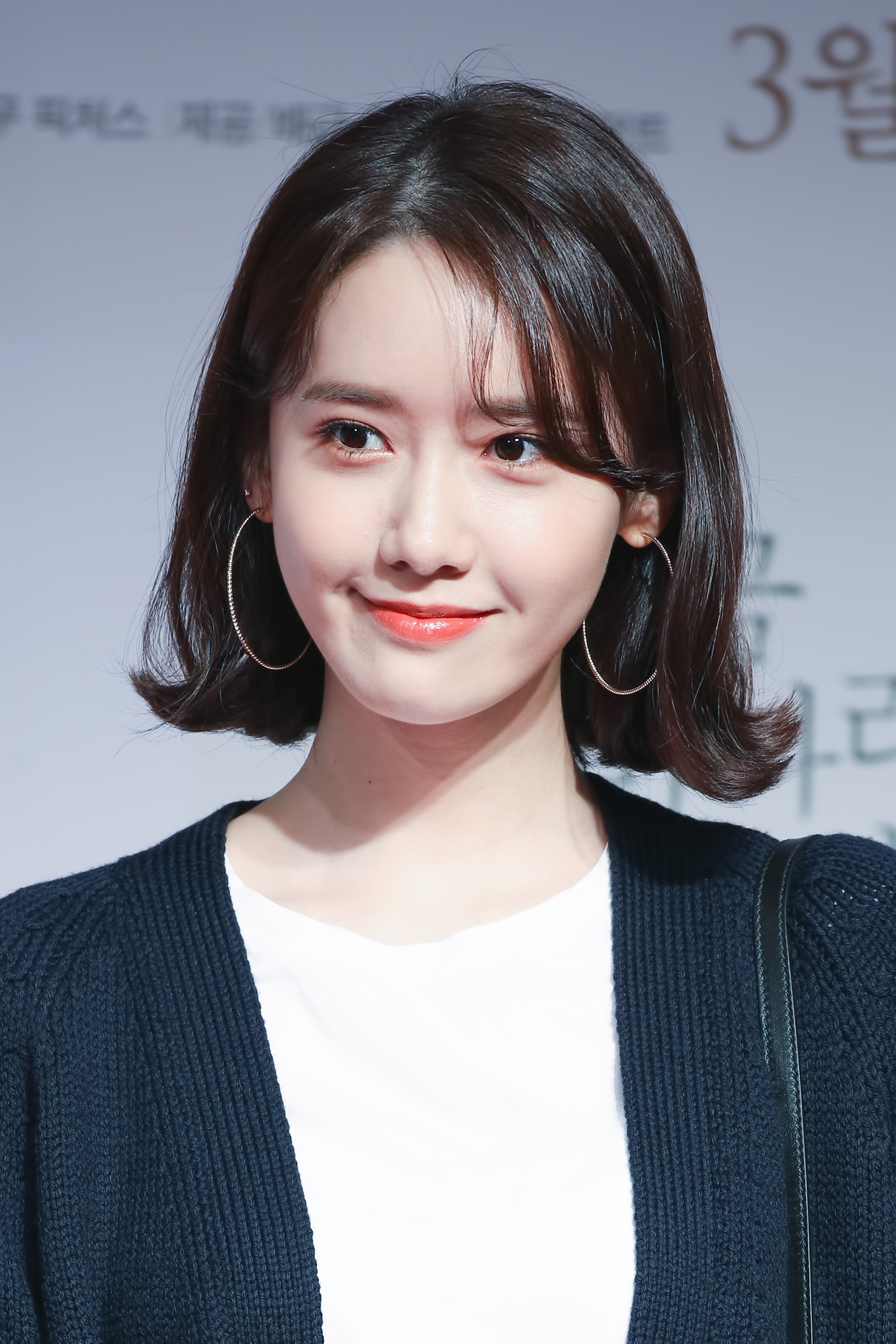
Lim in 2018

In 2018, Lim joined the second season of Hyori's Homestay as a new helper. She released her third solo single "To You" at the conclusion of the variety show. In August 2018, a Girls' Generation subgroup named Oh!GG was formed with Lim alongside the four other members who had decided to renew their contracts with SM entertainment; the group released the single "Lil' Touch".

To celebrate her 29th birthday, Lim released her debut extended play A Walk to Remember on May 30, 2019. The EP became the fastest-selling album in its first 24 hours by a female soloist. In July of the same year, Lim starred in the disaster action film Exit alongside Jo Jung-suk. It became the most popular movie of the summer and one of the highest-grossing films in South Korea by attracting over nine million viewers. Her first leading role earned her several wins and nominations, including her first Blue Dragon and Chunsa Film Art Awards Best Actress nominations, and a Best Actress win at the 1st Asan Chungmugong International Action Film Festival.

At the end of 2020, Lim returned to the small screen in JTBC's office drama Hush, where she played an intern reporter. In 2021, Lim starred in Lee Jang-hoon's romantic drama film Miracle: Letters to the President and also appeared in A Year-End Medley, a romantic comedy film by Kwak Jae-yong. The former earned her a second Blue Dragon Best Actress nomination and her first Baeksang Best Actress nomination.

In 2022, she was cast in the TV series Big Mouth as Lee Jong Suk's wife. She also reprised her role in the action-comedy sequel, Confidential Assignment 2: International, which subsequently also became one of the highest-grossing films in South Korea like its predecessor. She drew acclaim for both performances, the latter giving her first Best Supporting Actress award at the 58th Grand Bell Awards and her third Blue Dragon Best Actress nomination. Meanwhile, the former earned her Top Excellence Award for Actress in a Miniseries at the 2022 MBC Drama Awards.

In 2023, she was cast as the lead in the romantic-comedy drama King the Land alongside Lee Jun-ho. The series ranked number one on the Netflix's Weekly Global Top 10 in non-English TV show category for 3 weeks.

In 2025, she was cast in the lead role in the fantasy romantic television series Bon Appétit, Your Majesty alongside Lee Chae-min. Netflix identified the series as one of its hit titles in its third-quarter 2025 earnings report. Studio Dragon also cited the series as one of the works that contributed to its return to profitability in the third quarter of 2025. For her portrayal of a three-star Michelin chef who is transported back in time to serve as the chief royal cook for a Joseon king, Lim received the Grand Prize in the Culture Sector at the 2025 National Brand Awards and earned a Best Actress nomination at the 62nd Baeksang Arts Awards. In the same year, Lim reunited with director Lee Sang-geun in his second feature film Pretty Crazy. She received widespread praise for her performance in this film and it gave her first Best Actress award at the 29th Chunsa Film Art Awards and her fourth Best Actress nomination at the 46th Blue Dragon Film Awards. Lim also released the digital single "Wish to Wish" on December 19, 2025.

== Other ventures ==
=== Endorsements ===
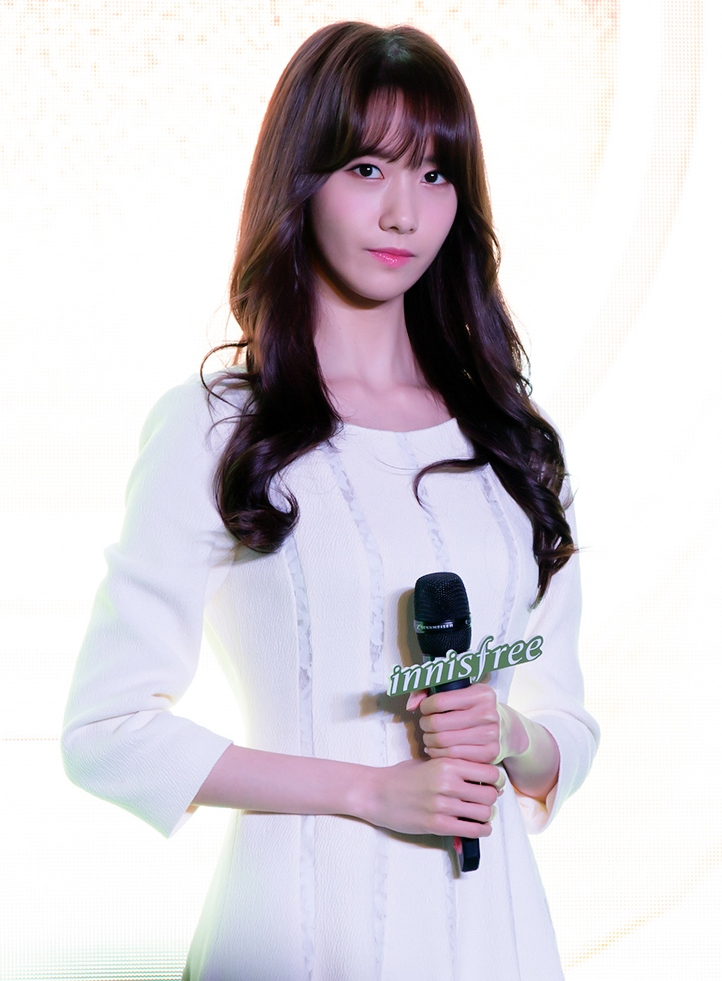
Lim during promotional event for Innisfree in Shanghai in January 2015

Lim has been called a "CF Queen" due to her several television commercial films, and has been a spokesperson for various brands. CNN credited her as "one of the household names in the Asia-Pacific region" which has helped Korean beauty brands become popular in China.

Before debuting in 2007, she became a model for the skin care brand Clean & Clear and Haitai Beverage's aid drink brand Sunkist Lemonade & Grapefruit Ade. In 2010, she became the first idol to endorse S-Oil, a large South Korean petroleum and refinery company. In 2012, she appeared in at least 20 commercials and was ranked fifth among celebrities with the most commercial appearances by TVCF, South Korea's largest advertisement information site. In 2013, she became the first overseas endorser for Alcon Taiwan.

From 2009 to 2020, Lim was a long-term spokesperson for Amorepacific's cosmetics brand Innisfree. Other major endorsements included Michael Kors, in which she became the brand's first ambassador in Korea, Asia-Pacific spokesperson for luxury cosmetics brand Estée Lauder, Danish jewellery brand Pandora, South Korean DB Insurance, Tous Les Jours, Crocs, and Lee Jeans.

In October 2021, she became the first person to be selected as global ambassador for Italian luxury fashion brand Miu Miu. In January 2023, Lim became the global face of the Miu Miu's 2023 Spring Summer collection campaign, alongside Emma Corrin, Kendall Jenner, Quintessa Swindell, Karolin Wolter, and more. In July 2023, Hong Kong-based luxury jewellery brand Qeelin announced her as its brand spokesperson. In October 2023, Lim became the global face of the Qeelin's Wulu 18 Diamond campaign. In December 2023, she became the global face of the Qeelin's Bo Bo Collection campaign alongside Liu Shishi.

In January 2024, she became the global face of the Qeelin's Wulu Echo Collection campaign. Later in May 2024, she became the global face of the Qeelin's New Yu Yi Collection campaign alongside Lay Zhang. As of August 28, 2024, Lim has been promoted to global brand spokesperson for Qeelin. On October 1, 2024, Lim was selected as the brand ambassador for Italian luxury house Valentino, after attending the first show of creative director Alessandro Michele to present the brand's Spring/Summer 2025 Collection. On February 27, 2025, Amorepacific's premier beauty brand Sulwhasoo appointed Lim as its global brand ambassador.

=== Ambassadorship ===
In 2012, Lim was appointed as the Honorary Ambassador of Jung District, Seoul. In 2014, Lim was appointed as ambassador for UNICEF's campaign, "UNIHERO", which aims to invite people to become heroes for the less fortunate children all around the globe. In 2015, Lim was named promotional ambassador for the National Tax Service. She has also received presidential commendation for having paid her taxes faithfully. In 2016, Lim participated in Crocs' "Come As You Are" campaign as one of the global ambassadors. In 2018, Lim was appointed as a safety ambassador for the Central Council for Safe Culture Campaign, held to pledge safety measures and eradication of dangerous activities such as speeding and illegal parking that prevents the entry of fire trucks.

In 2019, Lim became the first female celebrity to be appointed as an ambassador by the Ministry of Culture, Sports and Tourism and the Korea Tourism Organization. Starting September 2019, an advertisement campaign "Imagine Your Korea" was launched to improve Korean tourism awareness and attract more foreign tourists. The advertisements were displayed in countries such as China, Japan, Thailand, the Philippines, Vietnam and Malaysia. It was also displayed in Times Square every day until January 2021.

=== Philanthropy ===
Over the years, Lim has donated to various charities for causes such as social welfare and medical aid during the COVID-19 pandemic. She is a member of the 'Honor Society' of the Community Chest of Korea. In March 2025, Lim donated ₩100 million to the Community Chest of Korea to help victims recover from the March 2025 South Korea wildfires.

== Impact ==
As a member of Girls' Generation and an actress, Lim has been described as an "idol-actress" and a figure associated with the Korean Wave. She appeared in television advertisements before her debut with Girls' Generation and has since endorsed numerous brands, including a long-running partnership with Innisfree. In 2016, Forbes included Lim in its "30 Under 30 Asia" list in the Entertainment & Sports category.

Lim has frequently served as a host for year-end entertainment programs and awards ceremonies. She co-hosted the MBC Gayo Daejejeon for ten consecutive years from 2015 to 2024, and the Blue Dragon Series Awards for five consecutive years from 2022 to 2026.

On December 30, 2025, Lim received the Global Influence of Popular Culture award at the tenth edition of the National Brand Awards. The organizers cited her work in film, television, and music and her contribution to the international promotion of Korean popular culture.

== Discography ==
=== Extended plays ===
List of extended plays, showing selected details, selected chart positions, and sales figures
Title	Details	Peak chart positions		Sales
Title	Details	KOR	US World	Sales
Blossom	Released: August 4, 2016 (CHN); Label: SM Entertainment; Format: Digital download; Track listing: 1. Red Bean (红豆); 2. A Little Happiness (小幸运); 3. The Moon Represents My Heart (月亮代表我的心)	—	—	—N/a
A Walk to Remember	Released: May 30, 2019 (KOR); Label: SM Entertainment; Formats: CD, digital download, kihno	3	13	KOR: 53,051; US: 2,000
"—" denotes a recording that did not chart or was not released in that territory

=== Singles ===
List of singles, showing year released, selected chart positions, sales figures, and name of the album
Title	Year	Peak chart positions		Sales (DL)	Album
Title	Year	KOR	US World	Sales (DL)	Album
As lead artist
"Deoksugung Stonewall Walkway" (덕수궁 돌담길의 봄) (Note: as part of SM Station Season 1.) (feat. 10cm)	2016	24	7	KOR: 194,752; US: 2,000	A Walk to Remember
"When The Wind Blows" (바람이 불면) (Note: as part of SM Station Season 2.)	2017	— (Note: "When The Wind Blows" did not enter Gaon Digital Chart, but peaked at position 5 on component BGM Chart.)	8	—N/a	A Walk to Remember
"Summer Night" (여름밤) (featuring 20 Years of Age)	2019	— (Note: "Summer Night" did not enter Gaon Digital Chart, but peaked at position 35 on component BGM Chart.)	—	—N/a	A Walk to Remember
"Wish to Wish"	2025	—	—	—	Non-album single
Collaborations
"To You" (with Lee Sang-soon)	2018	— (Note: "To You" did not enter Gaon Digital Chart, but peaked at position 43 and 16 on component Download Chart and BGM Chart, respectively.)	—	—N/a	A Walk to Remember
"Knock Knock (Vocal by Yoona)" (노크 Knock) (with Epitone Project)	2023	— (Note: "knock knock" did not enter Circle Digital Chart, but peaked at position 95 on component Download Chart.)	—	—N/a	Knock Knock
Promotional singles
"Haptic Motion" (햅틱모션) (with Taeyeon, Jessica, Seohyun, and Sunny)	2008	—	—	—N/a	Non-album singles
"Innisfree Day" (이니스프리데이)	2010	— (Note: "Innisfree Day" did not enter Gaon Digital Chart, but peaked at position 90 on component Download Chart.)	—	—N/a	Non-album singles
Soundtrack appearances
"Amazing Grace"	2016	— (Note: "Amazing Grace" did not enter Gaon Digital Chart, but peaked at position 32 on component BGM Chart.)	—	—N/a	The K2
"—" denotes a recording that did not chart or was not released in that territory
