= 2023 APAN Star Awards =

9th edition of award ceremony

- Official poster
- Date: December 30, 2023
- Site: Dongdaemun Design Plaza Arthall 2, Jung-gu, Seoul
- Presented by: Korea Entertainment Management Association; Seoul Economic Promotion Agency
- Hosted by: Kim Seung-woo; Jang Ye-won

Highlights
- Most awards: King the Land (6)
- Most nominations: The Glory & King the Land (8)
- Grand Prize: Lee Jun-ho
- Drama of the Year: Little Women
- Website: APAN Star Awards

Television/radio coverage
- Network: tvN; Naver Now

The 2023 APAN Star Awards ceremony took place on December 30, 2023, at Dongdaemun Design Plaza Arthall 2 Jung-gu, Seoul, and was hosted by Kim Seung-woo and Jang Ye-won. It was broadcast exclusively on tvN and Naver Now. The awards ceremony integrates content from all channels, including domestic terrestrial broadcasting, general programming, cable, OTT, and web dramas, aired from October 2022 to November 2023.

In the award ceremony Lee Jun-ho won 5 awards including the Grand Award for his role in King the Land.

== Winners and nominees ==
Nominations were announced on December 19.

Winners are listed first and denoted in bold.

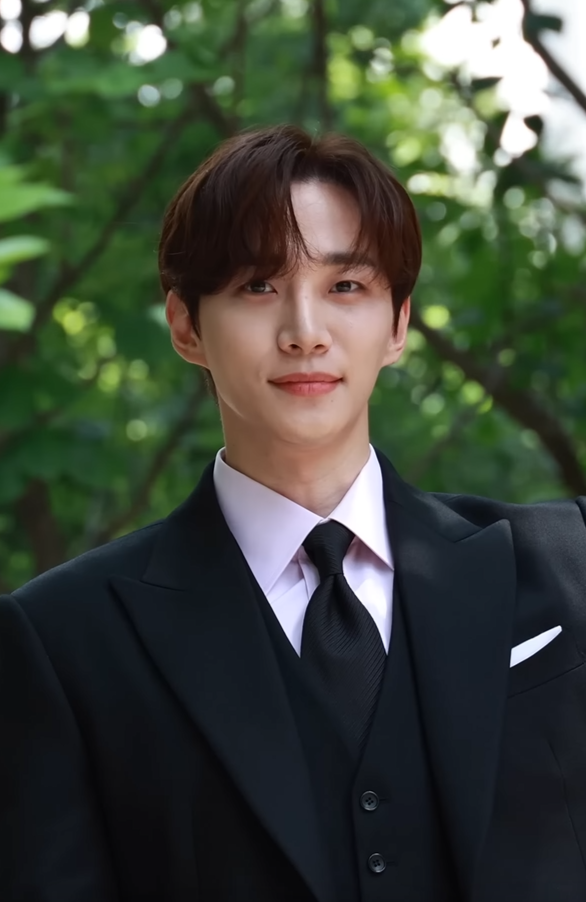
Lee Jun-ho, winner of Grand Prize

**Grand Prize (Daesang)**: **Lee Jun-ho – King the Land**	**Drama of the Year**: **Little Women** (tvN); The Glory (Netflix); Moving (Disney+); My Dearest (MBC TV); Reborn Rich (JTBC)
**Best Director**: **Park In-je – Moving**; Ahn Gil-ho – The Glory; Jung Dae-yoon – Reborn Rich; Kang Yoon-sung – Big Bet; Kim Seong-yong, Cheon Soo-jin, Lee Han-jun – My Dearest; Kim Young-hoon – Mask Girl	**Best Screenwriter**: **Kang Yoon-sung – Big Bet**; Kim Eun-sook – The Glory; Song Soo-han – Agency; Kang Full – Moving; Hwang Jin-young – My Dearest; Yang Hee-seung, Yeo Eun-ho – Crash Course in Romance
**Top Excellence Award, Actor in a Miniseries**: **Ryu Seung-ryong – Moving**; Choi Min-sik – Big Bet; Kim Woo-bin – Black Knight; Lee Jong-suk – Big Mouth; Lee Jun-ho – King the Land; Lee Sung-min – Reborn Rich & Shadow Detective; Namkoong Min – My Dearest & One Dollar Lawyer; Song Joong-ki – Reborn Rich	**Top Excellence Award, Actress in a Miniseries**: **Uhm Jung-hwa — Doctor Cha**; Im Yoon-ah – King the Land; Jeon Do-yeon– Crash Course in Romance; Kim Hye-soo – Under the Queen's Umbrella; Song Hye-kyo – The Glory; Kim Tae-ri – Revenant; Lee Bo-young – Agency; Ra Mi-ran – The Good Bad Mother & Cruel Intern
**Excellence Award, Actor in a Miniseries**: **Park Hae-soo — Narco-Saints**; **Jo Han-chul — Reborn Rich & Stealer: The Treasure Keeper**; Park Ji-hoon – Weak Hero Class 1; Yang Se-jong – Doona!; Wi Ha-joon – Little Women; Lee Do-hyun – The Good Bad Mother & The Glory; Ji Chang-wook – The Worst of Evil; Cha Eun-woo – Island	**Excellence Award, Actress in a Miniseries**: **Kim Seo-hyung — Pale Moon**; **Uhm Ji-won — Little Women**; Moon Chae-won – Payback; Kim Jung-eun– Strong Girl Nam-soon; Lim Ji-yeon – Lies Hidden in My Garden & The Glory; Jeon Jong-seo – Bargain & Money Heist: Korea – Joint Economic Area; Han Ji-min – Behind Your Touch; Hwang Jung-eum – The Escape of the Seven
**Top Excellence Award, Actor in a Serial Drama**: **Go Soo — Missing: The Other Side 2**; Han Suk-kyu – Dr. Romantic 3; Kim Rae-won – The First Responders; Lee Je-hoon – Taxi Driver 2; Son Hyun-joo – The Good Detective 2	**Top Excellence Award, Actress in a Serial Drama**: **Lee Sung-kyung — Dr. Romantic 3**; Baek Jin-hee – The Real Has Come!; Jang Seo-hee – Game of Witches; Lee Ha-na – Three Bold Siblings; Uee – Live Your Own Life
**Excellence Award, Actor in a Serial Drama**: **Son Ho-jun — The First Responders 2**; Kim Min-jae – Dr. Romantic 3 & Poong, the Joseon Psychiatrist 2; Yoo Jun-sang – The Uncanny Counter 2 & Alchemy of Souls: Light and Shadow; Kim Eui-sung – Taxi Driver 2; Baek Sung-hyun – The Love in Your Eyes	**Excellence Award, Actress in a Serial Drama**: **Kim Ok-vin — Arthdal Chronicles 2**; Kim So-eun – Three Bold Siblings; Ahn So-hee– Missing: The Other Side 2; Cha Joo-young – The Real Has Come!; Kim Se-jeong – The Uncanny Counter 2
**Excellence Award, Actor in a Short Drama**: **Joo Jong-hyuk — Do You Know Ashtanga**; Go Soo – O'PENing: Summer, Love Machine, Blues; Kim Ki-hae – Currently Offline; Park Ho-san – Hunted; Cha Hak-yeon – The Stain	**Excellence Award, Actress in a Short Drama**: **Shin Eun-soo — Nineteen Sea Otters**; Uhm Ji-won – O'PENing: Summer Cold; Kim Sae-byuk – Silence of the Lambs; Choi Soo-young – Fanletter, Please!; Lee Yeon – Shoot for Love
**Excellence Award, Actor in a Webseries**: **Choo Young-woo — Once Upon a Small Town**; Go Ho-jung – Choco Milk Shake; Kim Tae-hee – Set Three Men and Women; Yoo Jung-hoo – Bitch X Rich & New Love Playlist; Yoon Jae-chan – Set Three Men and Women	**Excellence Award, Actress in a Webseries**: **Yeri — Bitch X Rich**; Ryu Hye-young – Adult Kids; Oh Yoo-jin – New Love Playlist; Lee Eun-saem – Bitch X Rich; Joy – Once Upon a Small Town
**Excellence Acting Award, Actor**: **Lee Dong-hwi — Big Bet**; **Jung Seok-yong — D.P. 2**; Kim Hee-won – Han River & Behind Your Touch; Kim Won-hae – The Good Bad Mother & Revenant; Lee Hak-joo – My Dearest & Shadow Detective; Jung Hee-tae – Reborn Rich & Lies Hidden in My Garden; Jo Woo-jin – Narco-Saints	**Excellence Acting Award, Actress**: **Shin Ye-eun — Revenge of Others & The Secret Romantic Guesthouse**; **Yeom Hye-ran — The Glory, The Uncanny Counter 2 & Mask Girl**; Myung Se-bin – Doctor Cha; Jeon Hye-jin – Not Others; Oh Yoon-ah – Queen of Masks; Park Ji-hyun – Reborn Rich; Son Na-eun – Agency
**Best New Actor**: **Kim Dong-hwi — Missing: The Other Side 2 & The Deal**; **Moon Sang-min — Under the Queen's Umbrella**; Choo Young-woo – Oasis; Kim Ki-hae – Duty After School; Lee Jung-ha – Moving; Ryeoun – The Secret Romantic Guesthouse & Twinkling Watermelon	**Best New Actress**: **Lee Han-byeol — Mask Girl**; **Jo Aram — Doctor Cha**; Go Youn-jung – Alchemy of Souls & Moving; Kim Hieora – The Glory & The Uncanny Counter 2; Shin Eun-soo – Twinkling Watermelon
**Best Child Actor**: **Jung Hyeon-jun — Twinkling Watermelon & See You in My 19th Life**; Lee Si-on – Strong Girl Nam-soon & Pale Moon; Moon Woo-jin – Castaway Diva; Park Da-on – Cruel Intern & The Good Bad Mother	**Best Child Actress**: **Jeon Yu-na — The Kidnapping Day**; Ahn Tae-rin – Queen of Masks; Park So-yi – See You in My 19th Life; Seo Yi-soo – Strong Girl Nam-soon; Yoo Chae-hee – Pale Moon
**Best Couple**: **Lee Jun-ho & Im Yoon-ah — King the Land**	**Best Original Soundtrack**: **Young Tak — "Go Your Own Way" (Live Your Own Life OST)**
**Popularity Star Award, Actor**: **Lee Jun-ho — King the Land**	**Popularity Star Award, Actress**: **Im Yoon-ah — King the Land**
**Global Star Award**: **Lee Jun-ho — King the Land**	**Best Manager Award**: **CEO Baek Chang-ju - C-JeS Studios**
**Best Character Award**: **Lee Jun-ho — King the Land**	**Seoul League Actors Award**: **Lee Sung-kyung – Dr. Romantic 3**
**Global Creator of the Year Award**: **Anushka Sen**; **Nguyen Thi Phuong Thao**; **Karimova Elina**; **Cassandra Bankson**; **Kristel Fulgar**; **Kika Kim**	**Achievement Award**: **Byun Hee-bong**

== See also ==
- APAN Music Awards
- 8th APAN Star Awards
