= Gyo-dong =

Gyo-dong may refer to the following dong (neighbourhoods) in South Korea:

- Gyo-dong, Chuncheon
- Gyo-dong, Daegu
- Gyo-dong, Gangneung
- Gyo-dong, Gimcheon
- Gyo-dong, Gimje
- Gyo-dong, Gongju
- Gyo-dong, Gwonseon-gu
- Gyo-dong, Gyeongju
- Gyo-dong, Jecheon
- Gyo-dong, Jeonju
- Gyo-dong, Miryang
- Gyo-dong, Naju
- Gyo-dong, Paldal-gu
- Gyo-dong, Samcheok
- Gyo-dong, Sokcho
- Gyo-dong, Ulsan
- Gyo-dong, Yangsan
- Gyo-dong, Yeosu
