= 2nd Blue Dragon Series Awards =

2023 South Korean television awards ceremony

- Official poster
- Awarded for: Excellence in OTT television
- Date: July 19, 2023
- Site: Paradise City, Incheon
- Hosted by: Jun Hyun-moo; Lim Yoona
- Organised by: Sports Chosun
- Most wins: The Glory (2); Big Bet (2); SNL Korea (2); Weak Hero Class 1 (2); Park Jae-chan (2)
- Most nominations: The Glory (5); SNL Korea (5)
- Website: bsa.blueaward.co.kr/series/

Television/radio coverage
- Network: KBS2

The 2nd Blue Dragon Series Awards (Korean: 제2회 청룡 시리즈 어워즈) ceremony, organised by Sports Chosun was held on July 19, 2023, at Paradise City, Incheon, at 20:30 KST. It was hosted by Jun Hyun-moo and Lim Yoona and broadcast live through KBS2.

The nominees were announced on June 26, 2023. The series which were produced, invested by OTT platforms, and released from May 1, 2022, to May 31, 2023, were eligible for nominations.

With five nominations, The Glory and SNL Korea received the highest number of nominations for drama and variety programs, respectively.

== Winners and nominees ==
Winners are listed first and emphasized in bold.

**Blue Dragon's Choice (Grand Prize)**
**Song Hye-kyo – The Glory**
**Best Drama**	**Best Entertainment Program**
**Big Bet**; The Glory; Bargain; Narco-Saints; Weak Hero Class 1	**Siren: Survive the Island**; SNL Korea; Playou Level Up: Villain's World; Bloody Game; EXchange 2
**Best Actor**	**Best Actress**
**Ha Jung-woo – Narco-Saints**; Jin Seon-kyu – Bargain; Doh Kyung-soo – Bad Prosecutor; Choi Min-sik – Big Bet; Lee Sung-min – Shadow Detective	**Bae Suzy – Anna**; Jeon Yeo-been – Glitch; Song Hye-kyo – The Glory; Jung Ryeo-won – May It Please the Court; Kim Seo-hyung – Recipe for Farewell
**Best Male Entertainer**	**Best Female Entertainer**
**Yoo Jae-suk – Playou Level Up: Villain's World**; Shin Dong-yup – SNL Korea; Lee Kwang-soo – The Zone: Survival Mission; Hwang Je-sung – The Time Hotel; Hong Seok-cheon – Merry Queer	**Joo Hyun-young – SNL Korea**; Kwon Yu-ri – The Zone: Survival Mission; Lee Eun-ji – Love Alarm Clap! Clap! Clap!; Jang Do-yeon – Change Days; Yura – EXchange 2
**Best Supporting Actor**	**Best Supporting Actress**
**Lee Dong-hwi – Big Bet**; Park Sung-hoon – The Glory; Jang Ryeol – Bargain; Jo Woo-jin – Narco-Saints; Kim Jun-han – Anna	**Lim Ji-yeon – The Glory**; Lee Elijah – Bait; Jung Eun-chae – Anna; Kim Joo-ryoung – Big Bet; Kyung Soo-jin – Shadow Detective
**Best New Actor**	**Best New Actress**
**Park Ji-hoon – Weak Hero Class 1**; Kim Ki-hae – Duty After School; Moon Sang-min – Duty After School; Cha Eun-woo – Island; Bae In-hyuk – Cheer Up	**Shin Ye-eun – Revenge of Others**; Cha Joo-young – The Glory; Kwon Eun-bin – Duty After School; Han Ji-hyun – Cheer Up; Ahn Hee-yeon – Hit the Spot
**Best New Male Entertainer**	**Best New Female Entertainer**
**Dex – Bloody Game**; Nam Hyun-woo – SNL Korea; Kim Yo-han – Love Catcher in Bali; Lee Yi-kyung – Zero-Sum Game; BamBam – EXchange 2	**Kim Ah-young – SNL Korea**; Gabee – Love Catcher in Bali; Chuu – Love Alarm Clap! Clap! Clap!; Heo Young-ji – Change Days; Park Ji-min – Bloody Game
**Whynot Award**	**TIRTIR Popular Star Awards**
**Choi Hyun-wook – Weak Hero Class 1**	**Park Jae-chan**; **Kim Yeon-koung**; **Cha Eun-woo**; **Lee Kwang-soo**
**OST Popularity Award**
**Park Jae-chan – "Our Season" (Our Season: Spring with Park Jae-chan)**

=== Television programs with multiple wins ===
The following television programs received multiple wins:

Wins	Television programs
2	The Glory
2	Big Bet
2	SNL Korea
2	Weak Hero Class 1

=== Television programs with multiple nominations ===
The following television programs received multiple nominations:

Nominations	Television programs
5	The Glory
5	SNL Korea
4	Big Bet
3	Anna
3	Bargain
3	Bloody Game
3	Narco-Saints
3	EXchange 2
2	Change Days
2	Cheer Up
2	Duty After School
2	Love Alarm Clap! Clap! Clap!
2	Love Catcher in Bali
2	The Zone: Survival Mission
2	Playou Level Up: Villain's World
2	Weak Hero Class 1
2	Shadow Detective

== Presenters and performers ==
The following individuals, listed in order of appearance, presented awards or performed musical numbers.

=== Presenters ===
Presenter(s)	Award(s)	Ref.
Joo Hyun-young and Park Chanyeol	Best New Male Entertainer and Best New Female Entertainer	
Koo Kyo-hwan and Jung Ho-yeon	Best New Actor and Best New Actress	
Kim Shin-rok and Kim Sung-cheol	Best Supporting Actress	
Lee Hak-joo and Lee Yu-bin	Best Supporting Actor	
Kang Ho-dong and Song Eun-i	Best Male Entertainer and Best Female Entertainer	
Lee Jung-jae and Kim Go-eun	Best Actor and Best Actress	
Park Hyung-sik and Park Shin-hye	Best Entertainment Program	
Jung Hae-in and Han Hyo-joo	Best Drama	
Gong Hyo-jin	Blue Dragon's Choice	

=== Performers ===
Name(s)	Performed	Ref.
DJ Aster	"BSA Opening"	
STAYC	"Teddy Bear" and "Poppy"	
LACHICA	"BSA Performance" and "Run the World (Girls)"	
Jannabi	"She" and "Summer"	
Hwasa	"Twit" and "Maria"	
