= Big Deal (film) =

2025 film by Choi Yoon-jin

- Theatrical release poster
- Hangul: 소주전쟁
- Hanja: 燒酒戰爭
- Lit.: Soju Wars
- RR: Soju jeonjaeng
- MR: Soju chŏnjaeng
- Written by: Park Hyun-woo; Choi Yoon-jin
- Starring: Yoo Hae-jin; Lee Je-hoon; Son Hyun-joo; Choi Young-joon
- Cinematography: Kim Seong-an
- Music by: Dalpalan
- Production company: The Lamp
- Distributed by: Showbox
- Release date: May 30, 2025
- Running time: 105 minutes
- Country: South Korea
- Language: Korean
- Box office: US$2 million

Big Deal (Korean: 소주전쟁) is a 2025 South Korean semi-autobiographical drama film loosely based on the real-life sale of Jinro during the 1997 Asian financial crisis. The film follows Pyo Jong-rok (Yoo Hae-jin), a patriotic financial director at a soju company, and Choi In-beom (Lee Je-hoon), a revenue-driven global investment employee, as they clash over the fate of Korea's national liquor brand. It was released theatrically in South Korea on May 30, 2025.

The film was originally directed by Choi Yoon-jin but her name was omitted from the final credits after the production company, The Lamp, dismissed her, citing allegations of script appropriation. A Seoul court rejected her injunction to reverse the dismissal, allowing Big Deal to be released without her directorial credit.

== Synopsis ==
Set during the 1997 Asian financial crisis, the film follows Pyo Jong-rok, the CFO of Gukbo Group, a renowned soju company facing financial turmoil. Choi In-beom, an ambitious employee from the global investment firm Solqueen, approaches Gukbo with plans for acquisition. As the two men, driven by contrasting motivations, engage in a corporate battle, their relationship evolves, with soju serving as a symbolic bridge between them.

== Cast ==
- Yoo Hae-jin as Pyo Jong-rok, CFO of Gukbo Group
- Lee Je-hoon as Choi In-beom, an employee at global investment firm Solqueen
- Son Hyun-joo as Seok Jin-woo, the heir of Gukbo Group
- Choi Young-joon as Koo Young-mo, the head lawyer representing Gukbo Group
- Byron Mann as the head of the Hong Kong branch of Solqueen
- Kim Ki-hae as Baek Seong-bin
- Lee Chang-ho as development researcher
- Stephanie Michova as Julia
- Jang Jae-hyun as reporter

== Production ==
The film's cinematography is led by Kim Seong-an, known for his work on Intimate Strangers (2018) and Pilot (2024). Art director Kim Bo-mi, recognized for her contributions to Default (2018) and Escape (2024), brings a nuanced visual aesthetic to the film, capturing the emotional depth of the characters and the era.

== Release ==
Originally slated for release on June 3, 2025, Big Deal was rescheduled to premiere on May 30, 2025, to coincide with South Korea's Golden Week holiday, aiming to attract a larger audience during the peak movie-going season.
