= Jeonju Hanok Village =

Folk village in Jeonju, South Korea

Jeonju Hanok Village 전주한옥마을
- Village
- Interactive map of Jeonju Hanok Village
- Website: tour.jeonju.go.kr

Jeonju Hanok Village (Korean: 전주한옥마을 Hanja: 全州韓屋마을) is a village in the city of Jeonju, South Korea, and overlaps with the Pungnam-dong and Gyo-dong neighborhoods. The village contains over 800 Korean traditional houses called Hanok. The village is famous among Koreans and tourists because of its traditional buildings that strongly contrast with the modern city around it. The village was designated as an International Slow City in 2010 in recognition of its relaxed pace of life where traditional culture and nature blend harmoniously. The number of visitors to Jeonju Hanok Village has increased sharply since the 2000s. The visitor numbers more than doubled from 2007 to 2014, from 3.17 million to 7.89 million. Excluding Seoul, Jeonju is ranked third among major tourist cities throughout Korea, behind Jeju and Busan.

== History ==
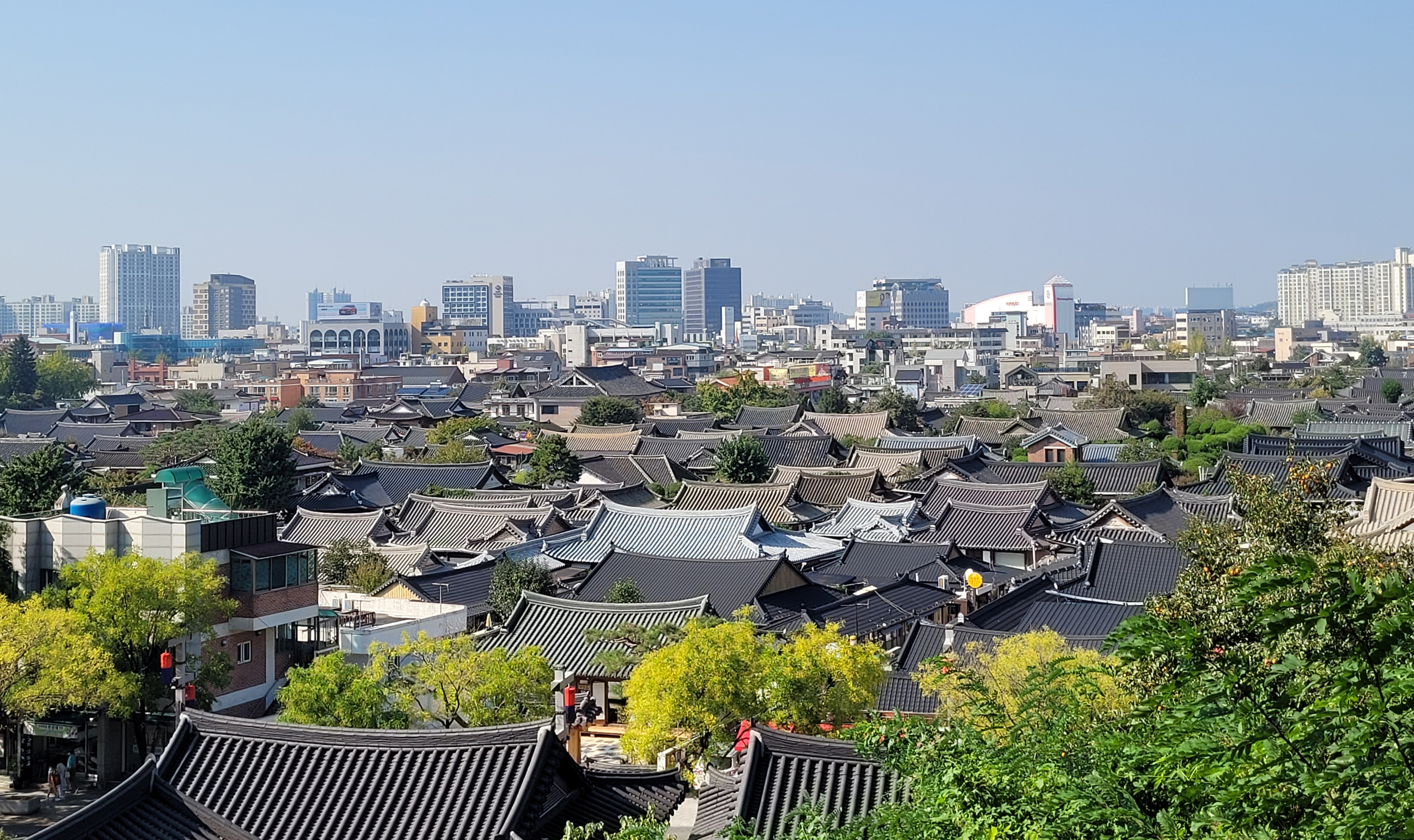
View of Jeonju Hanok Village

The City of Jeonju has played a key role in the long history of Korea. The city was once the capital of the Hubaekje Kingdom, which was founded by Kyŏn Hwŏn in the 900s. The city was regarded as the spiritual capital of the Joseon Dynasty because the Yi royal family was from there. In the Joseon Dynasty, Jeonju governed the Jeolla-do area along with Jeju Island, which was considered the center of administration. This is why the city is called 'the ground of more than 1000 years history'.

People first settled in the Jeonju area over 10,000 years ago. At first, people lived around the foot of a mountain. Then, in the Silla kingdom, people moved into the flat land surrounding the mountain. People in Jeonju began constructing the city's defensive wall and many villages naturally formed around the city. These villages were the beginning of the current Hanok village. After the demolition of the Jeonju's city wall during the Korean Empire period, the residential area within the wall began to expand throughout the Pungnam-dong and Gyo-dong districts led by the Yangban. The village has become one of the most popular tourist attractions of Jeonju.

== Attractions ==
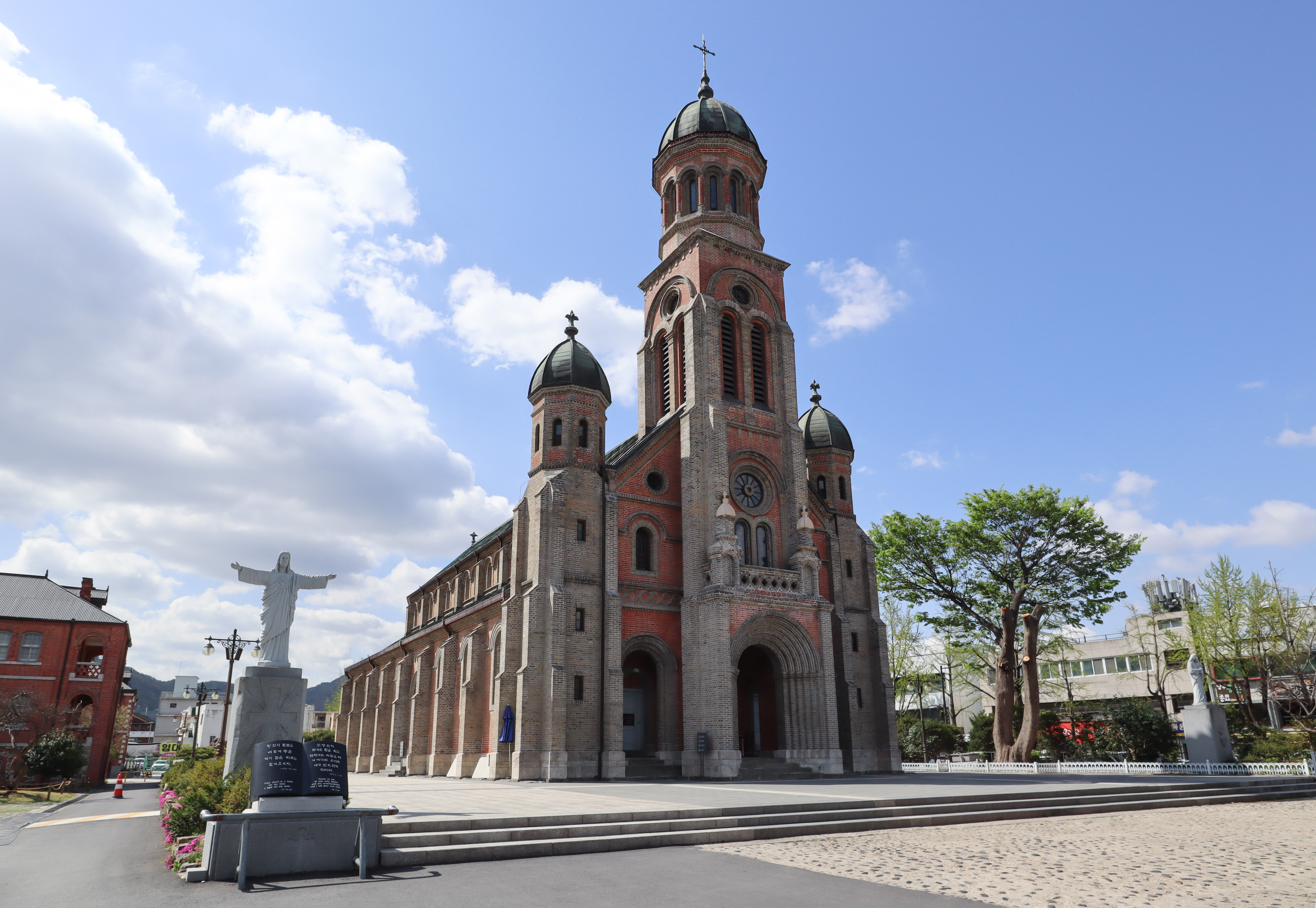
Jeondong Cathedral

=== Jeondong Cathedral ===
The Jeondong Catholic Church in Jeonju (Historic Site No. 288) was completed in 1914 and was designed by Priest Poinel, who also designed the famous Myeongdong Cathedral in Seoul. It is the largest and oldest western-style structure in the Jeollanam-do and Jeollabuk-do provinces. The church was built where the first Korean Catholic martyr, Yun Ji-chung (1759-1791), died. The architectural style of the Jeondong Cathedral is a mixture of the Romanesque and Byzantine styles and is considered one of the most beautiful buildings in Korea.

=== Omokdae ===
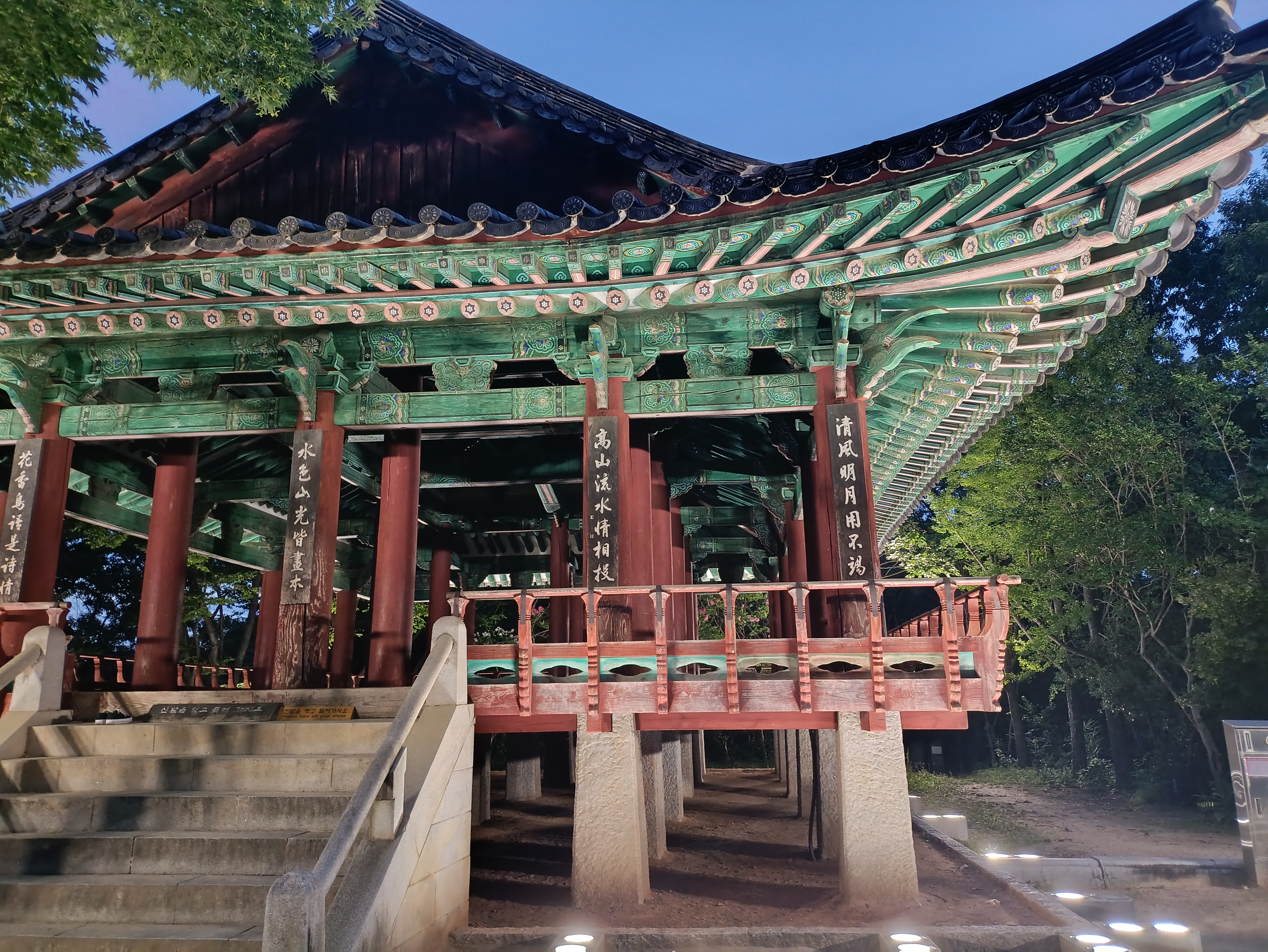
Omokdae Jeonju South Korea

Located on the east side of Hanok Village is the place where Lee Seonggae, founder of the Joseon Dynasty, gave an outdoor banquet in Jeonju during his triumphant return to Gaegyeong after a victory over Japanese coastal invaders at Hwangsan Mt. It is located at a high elevation, making it a good place to view the surrounding scenery. Many tourists start their journey here.

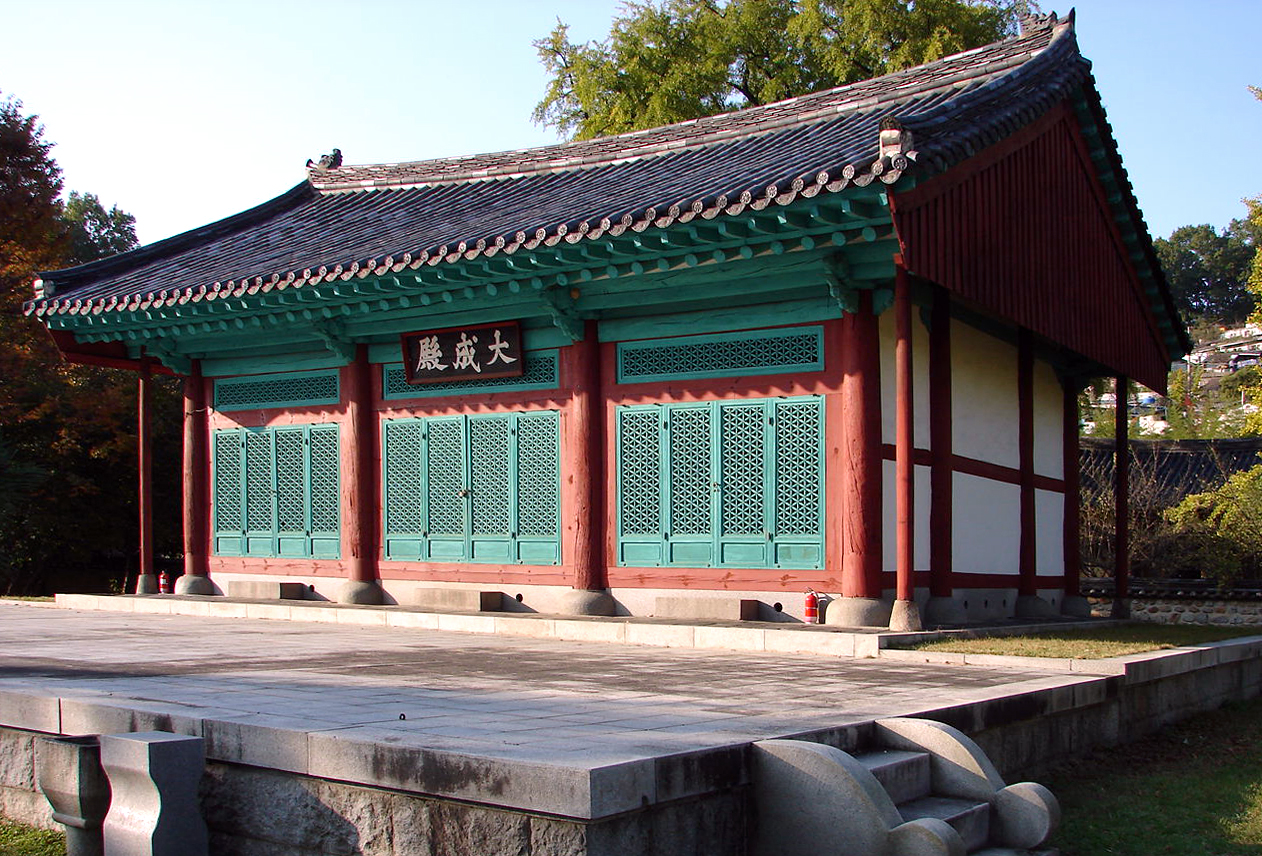
Daeseongjeon (shrine hall) at the Jeonju Hyanggyo

=== Jeonju Hyanggyo ===
The Jeonju Hyanggyo was a Confucian temple and school for students in Jeonju during the Joseon Dynasty period. It was first built by the King of Gongmin in 1354, during the Goryeo Dynasty period. It was originally located at the Gyeonggijeon Shrine site in Jeonju; however it was relocated twice after two wars. The main room in the shrine area, the Daeseongjeon (Confucian Shrine Hall), in located in the front, while the main room in the teaching area, the Myeongyundang (lecture hall), is located in the rear. This is an unusual configuration for a hyanggyo. In all, there are 99 rooms at the Jeonju Hyanggyo. It is the Korean Historical Treasure #379.

=== Gyeonggijeon ===
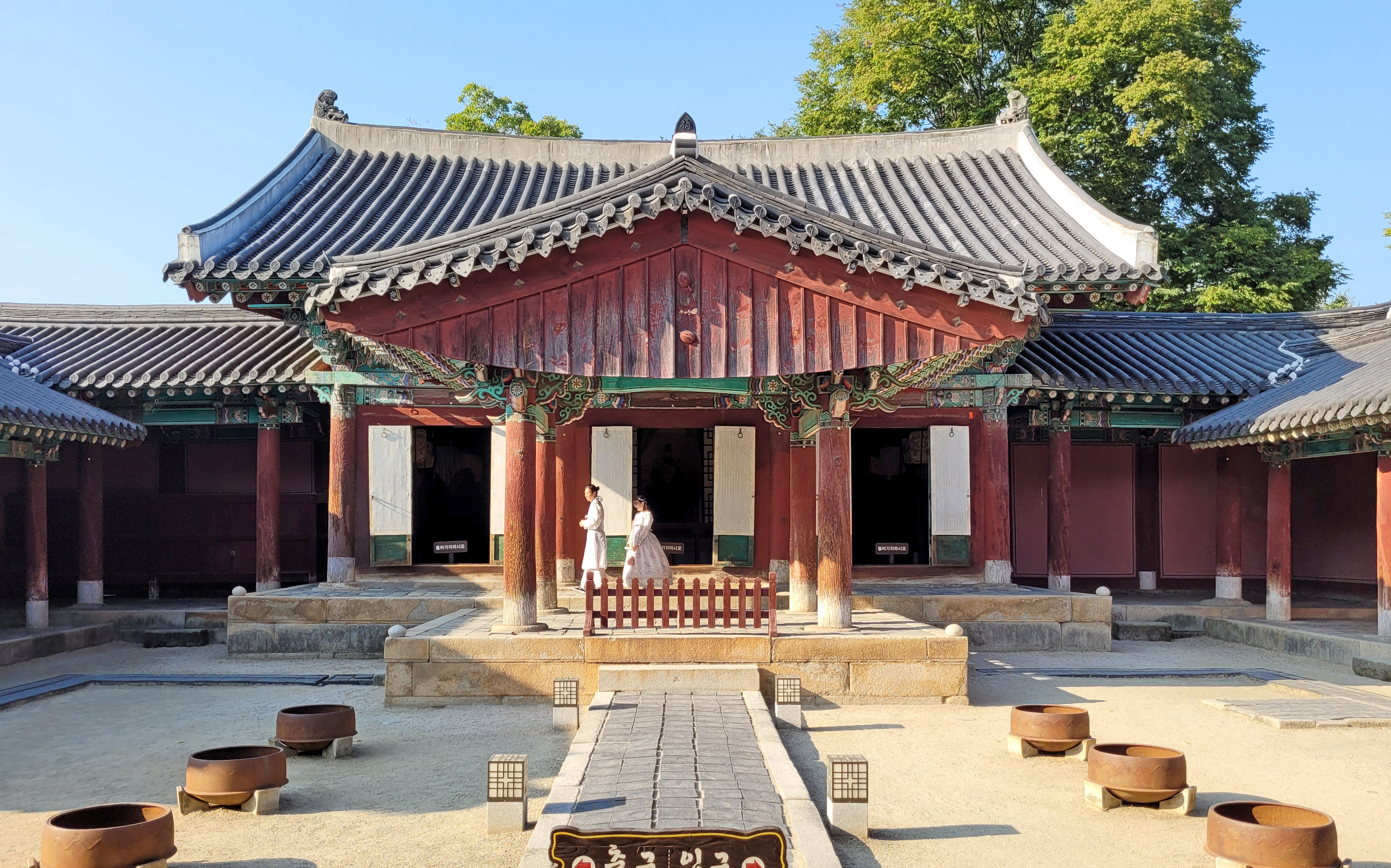
Main Hall of the Gyeonggijeon

Gyeonggijeon is the hall where the portrait of Lee Seonggae is enshrined. It was built in 1410, in the 10th year of King Taejong's rule. Gyoenggijueon is designated as the Private Historical Landmark of Korea #339, while the portrait of Lee Seonggae itself is designated as the National Treasure #317. Gyeonggijeon is located in front of the Jeonju Hanok Village, which is why many tourists come to see it first. Gyeonggijeon was once larger than it is now. The west side of Gyeonggijeon and its annex were demolished to make room for a Japanese elementary school during the period of Japanese Colonialism. The remaining building is a simple structure that connects a set of outer and inner gates.

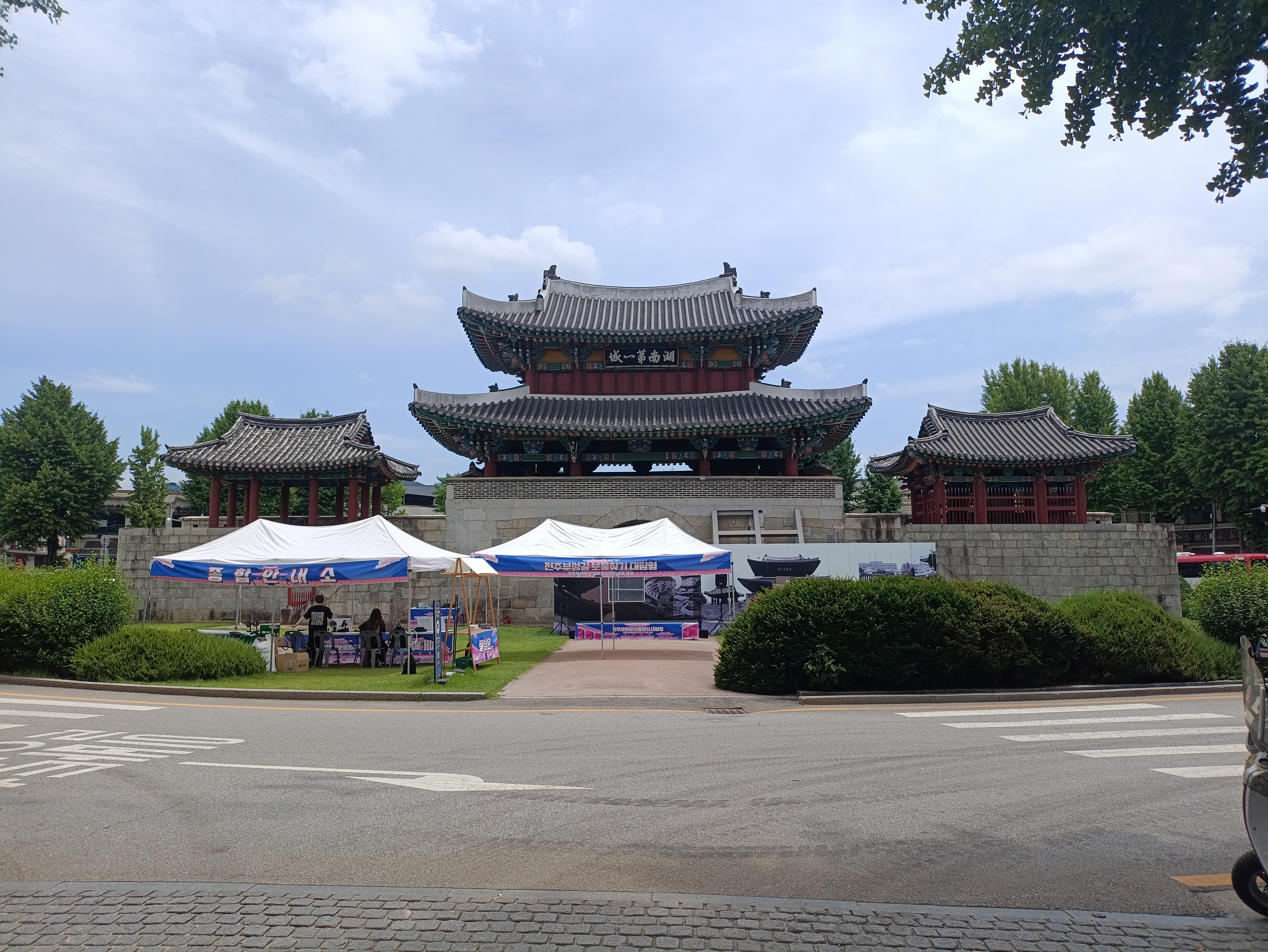
Pungnam Gate Jeonju South Korea

=== Pungnam Gate ===
Pungnam Gate is the south gate of the city wall that enclosed Jeonju during the Joseon Dynasty. It was the only remaining gate after the destruction of the wall. Pungnam Gate was designated as the National Treasure #308 on January 21, 1963. Jeonju was the provincial governor's capital during the Joseon Dynasty, so it had a set of fortifications to enclose the city. It had gates in all 4 directions, but all of them were demolished in 30th year of King Seonjo's rule (1597). After 3 years of repair work starting in 1978, the Pungnam Gate was restored. The column arrangement of the gate, especially the part located on the second story, is a very rare Korean building style.

=== Traditional Hanji (Korean Paper) Center ===
Traditional hanji (Korean Paper) is reproduced by hanji production techniques at the traditional Hanji Center. Authentic hanji is made here, and 80% of production is exported to Japan. The rest is sold in Korea. Visitors can participate in various papermaking programs that include designing patterns for the paper.

== Commercialization controversy ==
The area has been criticized for the replacement of traditional culture with a culture centered around tourism. With more than 6 million visitors, the number of commercial facilities in Jeonju Hanok Village has increased sharply over the last two years. Over 50% of the 506 commercial facilities in the village opened after 2013, with the number of stores increasing rapidly. Many of these are small food and beverage shops or stands. At the same time, the number of traditional tea houses has decreased from 10 to 6. Many professional handicraft workshops have been replaced by modern souvenir shops. The high volume of tourists has led to an increase in the cost of food and hotel rooms as well.

== See also ==
- Korean architecture
- History of Korea
- Namsangol Hanok Village
- Korean Folk Village
- Hahoe Folk Village
- Yangdong Village of Gyeongju
