= Kim Seo-hyung =

South Korean actress (born 1973)

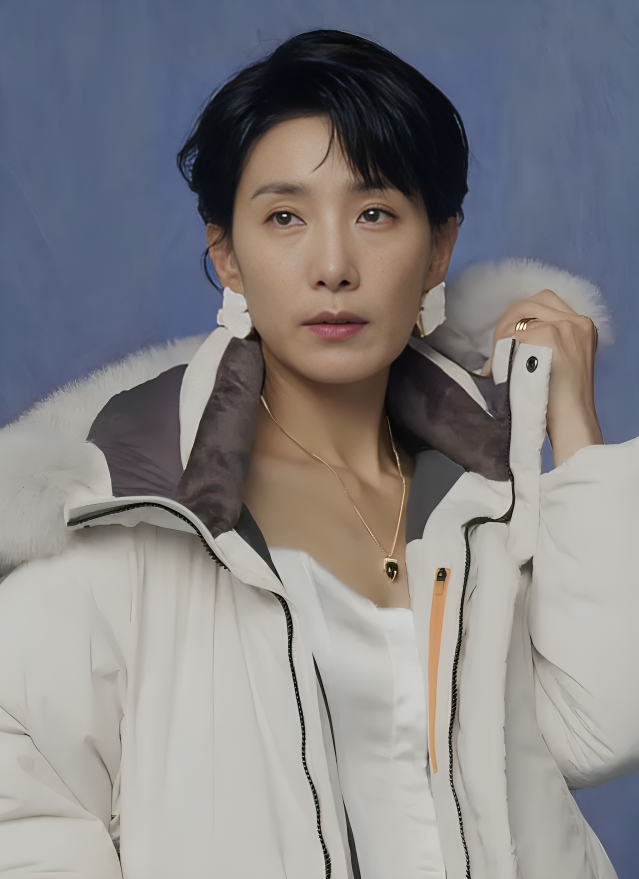
- Kim in October 2022
- Born: October 28, 1973 (age 52); Gangneung, Gangwon Province, South Korea
- Education: Yeongdong Women's College - Liberal Arts
- Occupation: Actress
- Years active: 1994–present
- Agent: Mystic Actors

Korean name
- Hangul: 김서형
- Hanja: 金瑞亨
- RR: Gim Seohyeong
- MR: Kim Sŏhyŏng

Signature
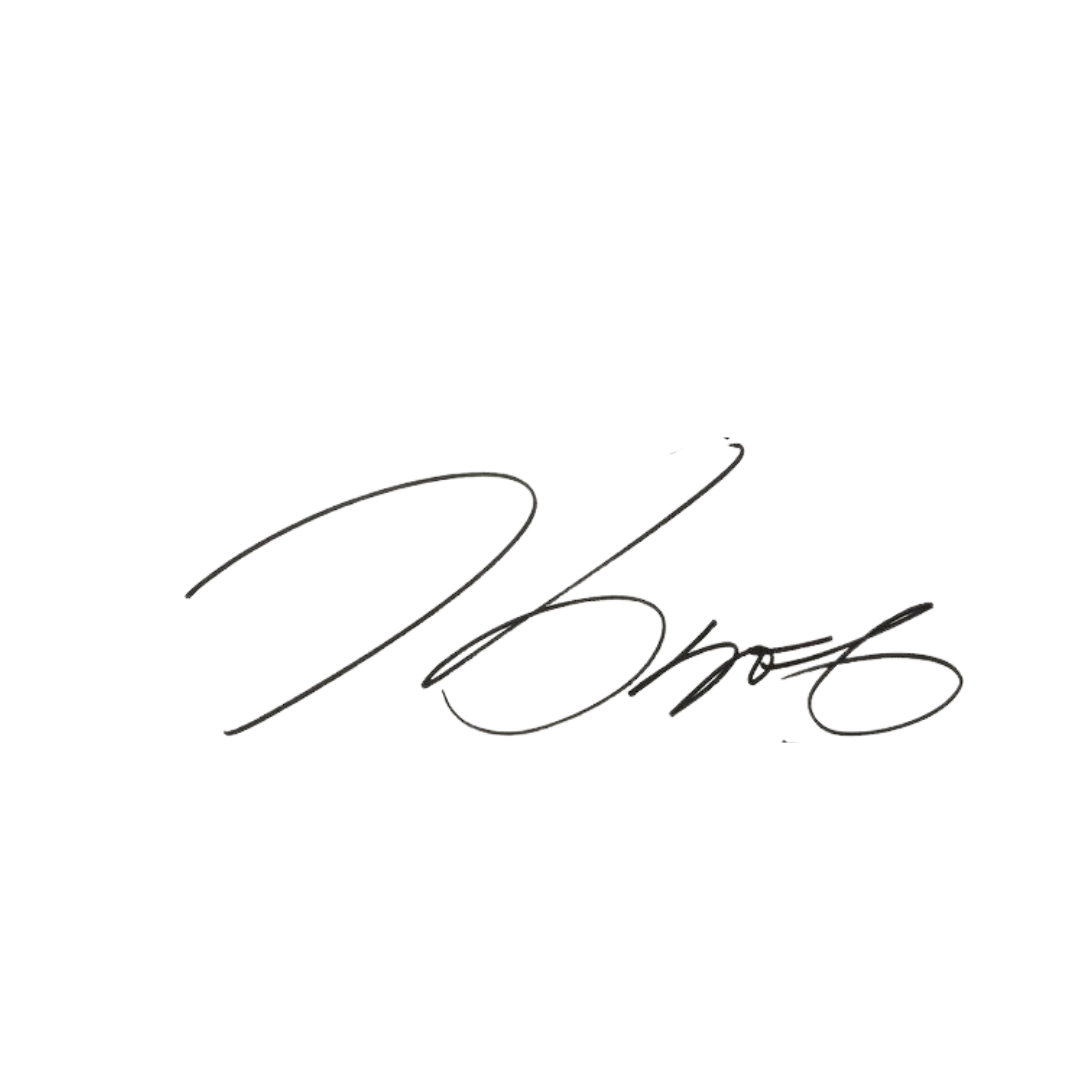

Kim Seo-hyung (Korean: 김서형; born October 28, 1973) is a South Korean actress. She is best known for her portrayal as the evil mistress Shin Ae-ri in the SBS revenge drama Temptation of Wife (2008) and as Coach Kim in the JTBC television series Sky Castle (2018), for which she received a Best Actress nomination at the 55th Baeksang Arts Awards.

As of May 2025, she is currently signed to Mystic Actors.

== Career ==
=== Early career ===
Kim participated in the 1992 Miss Gangwon Pageant and made her acting debut as a KBS talent in 1994.

=== Breakthrough role ===
She gained recognition for her portrayal as the evil mistress Shin Ae-ri in the SBS revenge drama Temptation of Wife which marked a significant shift in her career. Subsequently, she appeared in various dramas and movies, showcasing her talent in diverse roles. In 2014, she earned the award for Best Lead Actress in a Foreign Language Film at the 3rd Madrid International Film Festival for her performance in the film Late Spring. She also gained international attention for her role in The Villainess, which had its world premiere at the 70th Cannes Film Festival in May 2017.

=== Career resurgence ===
In the 2018 series Sky Castle, Kim Seo-hyung plays Coach Kim, a ruthless college entrance exam private tutor for wealthy families in an exclusive neighborhood. Coach Kim is known for her perfect success rate in getting students into top universities and uses psychological pressure to manipulate parents and children. Her character is driven by a dark past and a desire for revenge against society. She represents the damaging effects of South Korea's elite education system. Kim's performance as Coach Kim was widely acclaimed, earning her nomination for best supporting actress in 55th Baeksang Arts Awards, followed by a win in 12th Korea Drama Awards.

In 2020, she starred as the lead in SBS crime-thriller drama Nobody Knows. Kim Seo-hyung portrays Cha Young-jin, a detective in the Seoul Metropolitan Police Agency's Violent Crimes Division. Her character is defined by a past trauma: the loss of her best friend to a serial killer 19 years prior. This event drives her relentless pursuit of justice.

In Mine, Kim portrayed Jung Seo-hyun, the sophisticated daughter-in-law of the powerful Hyowon Group. Leading Seohyun Gallery, she exudes intelligence and composure, prioritizing family and business. Yet, beneath her facade, she grapples with societal pressures, including her suppressed sexuality and love for artist Suzy Choi.

In 2022, Kim starred in her first OTT drama Recipe for Farewell, which was based on the autobiographical essay book It Might Be a Little Spicy Today (오늘은 좀 매울지도 몰라) by Kang Chang-rae, which was published in 2018. Kim took on the role of Jung Da-jung, an independent woman who is the head of a small book publishing company in Seoul. The series centers around her poignant journey after she is diagnosed with terminal bowel cancer. Facing difficulties eating due to her condition, she makes an extraordinary request to her estranged husband, Kang Chang-wook (played by Han Suk-kyu), a humanities lecturer who only knows how to cook ramen: she asks him to cook for her every day. Her performance earned her a nomination for Best Actress at the 2nd Blue Dragon Series Awards.

In the independent film Vinyl House (also known as "Greenhouse"), Kim played the leading role of Moon-jung, a dedicated caregiver for a blind couple, Tae-kang and Hwa-ok, who also has dementia. Moon-jung lives in a vinyl house and dreams of finding a proper home for herself and her son. The film explores the difficult choices she makes after one of her elderly charges dies in an accident. Kim's performance in this challenging role earned her seven Best Actress nominations, winning six awards, including one at the 27th Busan International Film Festival and the Grand Prize at the 2023 Buil Film Awards.

== Filmography ==
=== Film ===
Year	Title	Role	Notes/Ref.
2000	The Record	Teacher	
2001	Kiss Me Much	Ballet teacher	cameo
2002	Over the Rainbow	Kyung-hee	
2002	A Perfect Match	Lee Kang-hyun	
2003	The Sweet Sex and Love	Shin-ah	
2005	Whispering Corridors 4: Voice	Hee-yeon	
2006	The City of Violence	Jang Mi-ran	
2006	Forbidden Floor	Chae Min-young	
2007	Black House	Jang Mi-na	
2010	A Barefoot Dream	Yu Bo-hyeon	
2010	Desire To Kill	Department Chief Baek	
2012	Doomsday Book	Min Yoo-ni	segment: "The Heavenly Creation"
2012	Wedding Ceremony	Woman	short film
2013	The Berlin File	North Korean embassy secretary	
2013	Shorts Meet Shorts	Mi-jung	segment: "Waltzing on Thunder"
2014	Late Spring	Jung-sook	
2017	The Villainess	Kwon-sook	
2020	Mr. Zoo: The Missing VIP	Min Soo-hee	
2021	Whispering Corridors 6: The Humming	Noh Eun-hee	
2023	Greenhouse	Moon-jung	
2024	Dog Days	Jin-yeong	

=== Television series ===
Year	Title	Role	Notes/Ref.
1994	Tomorrow's Love		
1994	Daughters of a Rich Family		
1995	Blue Sky		
2003	Breathless	Yoon Yeo-joo	
2004	Lovers in Paris	Baek Seung-kyung	
2004	Best Theater	Yoon Da-hee	episode: "Love, Standing on a Slope"
2004	Drama City	Jae-kyung	episode: "His Wife's Diary"
2005	Be Strong, Geum-soon!	Ha Seong-ran	
2005	Green Rose	Cha Yoo-ran	
2007	Oh Lovers	Ha Jae-in	
2008	Temptation of Wife	Shin Ae-ri	
2010	Giant	Yoo Kyung-ok	
2012	History of a Salaryman	Mo Ga-bi	
2012	My Husband Got a Family	Chun Jae-yong's older sister	guest role, episodes 47-48
2012	What is Mom	Park Seo-hyung	
2013	After School: Lucky or Not	Cafeteria Lady	cameo, episodes 4 & 9
2013	Empress Ki	Empress Dowager Hwang (Budashiri)	
2014	A New Leaf	Lee Seon-hee	recurring role
2015	Assembly	Hong Chan-mi	
2016	The Good Wife	Seo Myeong-hee	
2018	Welcome to Waikiki	Kim Hee-ja	guest role, episode 4
2018	Tempted	Myeong Mi-ri	
2018	Come and Hug Me	Park Hee-young	recurring role, episodes 5-22
2018	Sky Castle	Kim Joo-young	
2020	Nobody Knows	Cha Yeong-jin	
2021	Mine	Jeong Seo-hyeon	
2023	Pale Moon	Yoo Yi-hwa	

=== Web series ===
Year	Title	Role	Ref.
2022	Recipe for Farewell	Da Jung	

== Discography ==
=== Soundtrack appearances ===
Year	Song title	Notes
2009	"In the Flower Garden (Shin Ae-ri Ballad)"	Temptation of Wife OST
2009	"Can't Forgive (Shin Ae-ri Rock)"	Temptation of Wife OST
2014	"Spring"	Late Spring OST

== Accolades ==
=== Awards and nominations ===
Year	Award	Category	Nominated work	Result	Ref.
1992	Miss Gangwon Pageant	Miss Samsung	—N/a	Won	
2009	SBS Drama Awards	Excellence Award, Actress in a Serial Drama	Temptation of Wife	Won	
2010	SBS Drama Awards	Best Supporting Actress in a Special Planning Drama	Giant	Nominated	
2012	SBS Drama Awards	Special Award, Actress in a Miniseries	History of a Salaryman	Nominated	
2014	3rd Madrid International Film Festival	Best Lead Actress in a Foreign Language Film	Late Spring	Won	
2014	14th Milan International Film Festival	Best Supporting Actress	Late Spring	Nominated	
2015	KBS Drama Awards	Best Supporting Actress	Assembly	Won	
2017	1st The Seoul Awards	Best Supporting Actress (Film)	The Villainess	Nominated	
2018	MBC Drama Awards	Best Supporting Actress in a Wednesday-Thursday Miniseries	Come and Hug Me	Nominated	
2019	55th Baeksang Arts Awards	Best Actress (TV)	Sky Castle	Nominated	
2019	Brand of the Year Awards	Actress of the Year	Sky Castle	Won	
2019	12th Korea Drama Awards	Hot Star China Award	Sky Castle	Won	
2020	24th Asian Television Awards	Best Actress in a Supporting Role	Sky Castle	Nominated	
2020	SBS Drama Awards	Top Excellence Award, Actress in a Miniseries Action Drama	Nobody Knows	Won	
2023	2nd Blue Dragon Series Awards	Best Actress	Recipe for Farewell	Nominated	
2023	32nd Buil Film Awards	Best Actress	Greenhouse	Won	
2023	43rd Korean Association of Film Critics Awards	Best Actress	Greenhouse	Won	
2023	43rd Golden Cinema Film Festival	Best Actress	Greenhouse	Won	
2023	13th Beautiful Artist Awards (Shin Young-kyun Arts and Culture Foundation)	Independent Film Artist Award	Greenhouse	Won	
2023	59th Grand Bell Awards	Best Actress	Greenhouse	Won	
2023	44th Blue Dragon Film Awards	Best Leading Actress	Greenhouse	Nominated	
2023	9th APAN Star Awards	Excellence Award, Actress in a Miniseries	Pale Moon	Won	

=== State honors ===
Name of country, award ceremony, year given, and name of honor
Country	Award Ceremony	Year	Honor	Ref.
South Korea	The 52nd Savings Day (Note: "Savings Day" (Jeochug-ui Nal) is a commemorative day established in 1964 to promote a savings culture among South Korean citizens. In 1973, it was integrated with other commemorative days, such as "Securities Day" and "Insurance Day," during the consolidation of various commemorative days. When it was first established in 1964, the designated date for Savings Day was September 21st. It was then changed twice, first to September 25th in 1966, and then to October 25th in 1973. Finally, in 1984, it was designated as the "last Tuesday of October," which brings us to the present day.)	2015	Financial Chairman's Award	
South Korea	10th Korean Popular Culture and Arts Awards (Note: Since 2010 Honors are given at the Korean Popular Culture and Arts Awards, arranged by the Korea Creative Content Agency and hosted by the Ministry of Culture, Sports and Tourism.)	2019	Prime Minister's Commendation	
