= Light Shop =

2024 South Korean television series

- Promotional poster
- Also known as: Lightshop Keeper
- Hangul: 조명가게
- Hanja: 照明가게
- RR: Jomyeonggage
- MR: Chomyŏnggage
- Genre: Mystery; Horror
- Based on: Light Shop by Kang Full
- Written by: Kang Full
- Directed by: Kim Hee-won
- Starring: Ju Ji-hoon; Park Bo-young; Kim Seol-hyun; Bae Seong-woo; Uhm Tae-goo; Lee Jung-eun; Kim Min-ha; Park Hyuk-kwon; Kim Dae-myung; Shin Eun-soo; Kim Sun-hwa; Kim Ki-hae
- Music by: Kim Hae-won
- Country of origin: South Korea
- Original language: Korean
- No. of episodes: 8

Production
- Executive producers: Yoo Jae-hyuk; Shim Se-yoon; Jo Neung-yeon
- Producers: Choi In-joon; Han Sang-hyun
- Cinematography: Park Sung-hoon
- Editor: Kim Man-geun
- Running time: 40–77 minutes
- Production companies: Mr. Romance; Moving Pictures Co.

Original release
- Network: Disney+
- Release: December 4 – December 18, 2024

Light Shop (Korean: 조명가게) is a 2024 South Korean mystery horror television series written by Kang Full and directed by Kim Hee-won. The series stars an ensemble cast led by Ju Ji-hoon and Park Bo-young along with Kim Seol-hyun, Bae Seong-woo, Uhm Tae-goo, Lee Jung-eun, Kim Min-ha, Park Hyuk-kwon, Kim Dae-myung, Shin Eun-soo, Kim Sun-hwa, and Kim Ki-hae, based on the webtoon of the same name by Kang. It was released on Disney+ from December 4 to 18, 2024.

It has become Disney+'s biggest Korean original premiere of 2024, and ranks as the second-largest Korean series debut ever on the platform globally, trailing only Moving – both series created by webtoon artist Kang Full.

== Synopsis ==
The series follows the story of a group of strangers who are all having a hard time processing a horrible experience from their past. Each of them is going about their normal lives when they are all strangely pulled to a light shop located at the end of a dubious alleyway. A cautious shopkeeper guards the light shop, which may contain the key to the strangers' pasts, present, and futures.

== Cast and characters ==
- Ju Ji-hoon as Jung Won-young

The owner of the light shop.

- Park Bo-young as Kwon Young-ji

A nurse with an unusual connection to her patients.

- Kim Seol-hyun as Lee Ji-young

A mysterious woman who was in a relationship with Hyun-min.

- Bae Seong-woo as Yang Sung-sik

A police officer.

- Uhm Tae-goo as Kim Hyun-min

A man who develops an inexplicable curiosity about a mysterious woman sitting at a bus stop.

- Lee Jung-eun as Jung Yu-hee

A distraught mother who sends her daughter Hyun-joo to the light shop daily for light bulbs.

- Kim Min-ha as Yoon Seon-hae

A screenwriter who experiences strange things after moving into an old house.

- Park Hyuk-kwon as Oh Seung-won

A mysterious man who always wanders the dark alleys while wet.

- Kim Dae-myung as Kim Sang-hoon

A mysterious restaurant owner who becomes the main suspect in a suspected murder case.

- Shin Eun-soo as Joo Hyun-joo

A girl who stops by the light shop every day.

- Kim Sun-hwa as Park Hye-won

A woman who wanders through a dark alley on a rainy night wearing red heels.

- Kim Ki-hae as Heo Ji-ung

A high school student who encounters various people wandering around the light shop.

- Oh Hye-won as Moon Yoo-na

A sergeant belonging to the Gangdong Police Station's investigation team and works in the CCTV investigation team.

- Oh Hee-joon as Song Kyung-jang

A detective.

- Go Youn-jung as Jang Hui-su (special appearance)

== Production ==
=== Development ===
Actor Kim Hee-won was selected as the director for Kang Full's Light Shop, which was serialized on Kakao Webtoon in 2011. This marked Kim's debut as a director. Mr. Romance and Moving Pictures Co. managed the production of the series.

=== Casting ===
In 2023, Ju Ji-hoon, Kim Seol-hyun, Bae Seong-woo, and Park Bo-young were cast for the series.

Ju, Kim, Bae, and Park together with Uhm Tae-goo, Lee Jung-eun, Kim Min-ha, Park Hyuk-kwon, Kim Dae-myung, Shin Eun-soo, Kim Sun-hwa, and Kim Ki-hae were officially confirmed to play various roles on January 19, 2024.

== Release ==
Light Shop was announced to be released exclusively on Disney+ in the second half of 2024. Disney+ confirmed that the release date of the series would be on December 4, 2024, where four out of eight episodes would release at once and the remaining four for the following two weeks.

== Accolades ==
Award ceremony	Year	Category	Nominee	Result	Ref.
Baeksang Arts Awards	2025	Best Director	Kim Hee-won	Nominated	
Global OTT Awards	2025	Best Writer	Kang Full	Nominated	
Global OTT Awards	2025	Best Visual Effects	Light Shop	Nominated	
