= Kim Su-gyeom =

South Korean actor (born 2001)

- Born: December 3, 2001 (age 24); South Korea
- Education: Hanlim Multi Art School; Seoul Institute of the Arts
- Occupation: Actor
- Years active: 2019–present
- Agent: Gold Medalist
- Height: 188 cm (6 ft 2 in)

Korean name
- Hangul: 김수겸
- RR: Gim Sugyeom
- MR: Kim Sugyŏm
- Website: goldmedalist.com/Kim_Su-gyeom

Kim Su-gyeom (Korean: 김수겸, born December 3, 2001) is a South Korean actor. He made his debut as an actor in 2020. He is well known for his roles in Weak Hero Class 1 (2022) and Duty After School (2023).

== Early life ==
Kim graduated from the Fashion Model Department at Hanlim Multi Art School. He studied in the Department of Acting at Seoul Institute of the Arts.

== Filmography ==
=== Film ===
Year	Title	Role	Notes	Ref.
2021	A Year-End Medley	Lee Chul-min		
2022	A Home from Home	Chang Rim		
TBA	Akgu: The Secret of the Moon Shadow	Noh-do		

=== Television series ===
Year	Title	Role	Notes	Ref.
2021	At a Distance, Spring Is Green	Nam Gu-hyeon		
2024	Dongjae, the Good or the Bastard	Nam Gyeong-re		
2025	The Dream Life of Mr. Kim	Lee Jeong-hwan		

=== Web series ===
Year	Title	Role	Notes	Ref.
2020	Love Revolution	Namgoong Ji-soo		
2022	Juvenile Justice	Gang member	Cameo (Ep. 3)	
2022	Weak Hero Class 1	Jeon Young-bin		
2023	Duty After School	Kwon Il-ha		
TBA	Study Group	Choi Moo-gyu	Season 2	

=== Television shows ===
Year	Title	Role	Notes	Ref.
2025	The Gentlemen's League 4	Cast member		
