= Ahn Do-gyu =

South Korean actor (born 2000)

- Born: September 28, 2000 (age 26); South Korea
- Other name: Ahn Do-kyu
- Occupation: Actor
- Years active: 2007–present

Korean name
- Hangul: 안도규
- Hanja: 安道奎
- RR: An Dogyu
- MR: An Togyu

Ahn Do-gyu (Korean: 안도규; born September 28, 2000) is a South Korean actor. He made his debut an actor in 2007. He is well known for his roles in Duty After School, and Twinkling Watermelon.

== Filmography ==
=== Television series ===
Year	Title	Role
2007	It Is Okay to Love	Ahn Maruchi
2007	Drama City – "When Her Star Shines"	Hyun-soo
2008	Drama City – "In the Name of the Father"	Han Dong-min
2008	Single Dad in Love	Kang San
2008	Lovely-in-Laws	Park Joon
2011	Birdie Buddy	Sung Tae-gap (young)
2011	Glory Jane	Kim Young-kwang
2012	The Third Hospital	Kim Doo-hyun (young)
2012	The King's Doctor	Baek Kwang-hyun (young)
2012	Full House Take 2	Lee Tae-ik (child)
2012	Missing You	Kang Hyung-joon (young)
2013	Empress Ki	Wang Yoo (young)
2014	You're All Surrounded	Kim Ji-yong (young)
2015	Splendid Politics	Kang In-woo (young)
2017	Naked Fireman	Kang Chul-soo (young)
2017	Queen for Seven Days	Lee Yoong (young)
2018	Bad Guys 2	Heo Il-hoo (young)
2018	Live	Seo-hyung
2018	A Poem a Day	Ye Jae-wook (young)
2021	Voice 4	Hwang Mi-na
2023	Twinkling Watermelon	Oh Ma-joo
2024	Seoul Busters	Lee Ji-Ung (Ep. 4-6)
2024	Connection	teen No Gyu-min

=== Web series ===
Year	Title	Role	Ref.
2020	Love Revolution	Ahn Kyung-min	
2020	Sweet Home	Kim Do-hun	
2022	Rookie Cops	Hong Yoon-gi	
2022	Blueming	Do Ba-woo	
2023	Duty After School	Guk Young-soo	

=== Films ===
Year	Title	Role	Ref.
2009	Fly, Penguin	Choi Seung-yoon	
2010	Rolling Home with a Bull	Dong Ja-seung	
2012	A Werewolf Boy	Dong-seok	
2014	Murderer	Im Yong-ho	
2020	Last Blues, Last Dance	Jang Ki-hyun	

== Theater ==
Year	Title	Role	Ref.
2021	A Midsummer Night's Dream	Nick Bottom (cast A)	

== Awards and nominations ==
Year	Award	Category	Nominated work	Result
2008	KBS Drama Awards	Best Young Actor	Single Dad in Love	Nominated
2011	KBS Drama Awards	Best Young Actor	Glory Jane	Nominated
2012	MBC Drama Awards	Best Young Actor	The King's Doctor	Nominated
