= Lee Soon-won (actor) =

South Korean actor

- Born: 19 February 1983 (age 43); South Korea
- Occupation: Actor
- Years active: 2008–present

Korean name
- Hangul: 이순원
- RR: I Sunwon
- MR: I Sunwŏn

Lee Soon-won (born 19 February 1983) is a South Korean actor.

== Filmography ==
=== Film ===
Year	Title	Role	Notes	Ref.
2016	Master	Criminal Investigation Team Member		
2017	Fabricated City	Galchi		
2017	Man of Will	Cheon Jong-soo		
2017	Forgotten			
2019	Idol	Warder		
2021	Only Can You See Me	Lee Young-sik		
2022	6/45	Choi Seung-il		
2022	Open the Door	Moon-seok	Premiere at 27th BIFF	
2025	Hitman 2	NIS agent		
2025	Run To You	Joon-su		
2027	The Sword: Rebirth of the Red Wolf	Jeok In-geol		

=== Television series ===
Year	Title	Role	Notes	Ref.
2016	Local Hero	Han Joon-hee		
2016	Kidnapping Assemblyman Mr. Clean			
2016	The K2	JSS Body Guard Team Leader		
2018	Live	Ban Jong-min		
2019	Nokdu Flower	Kim Moon-hyun		
2019	Chief of Staff	Detective Lee Hyeong-bae		
2019	Class of Lies	Park Won-seok		
2019	Drama Stage - Big Data Romance	Park Sang-hoon		
2020	Search	Chun Min-jae		
2020	Delayed Justice	Kim Gwi-hyun		
2023	The Matchmakers	Kim Bok-gi		

=== Web series ===
Year	Title	Role	Notes	Ref.
2022–2023	Island	Secretary Kang	Part 1	
2023	Duty After School	Kim Won-bin	Part 1	
2023	Black Knight	3-3		

== Awards and nominations ==
Name of the award ceremony, year presented, category, nominee of the award, and the result of the nomination
Award ceremony	Year	Category	Nominee / Work	Result	Ref.
Buil Film Awards	2023	Best New Actor	6/45	Nominated	
