= Lee Ruby =

South Korean actress (born 2000)

- Born: October 30, 2000 (age 25); South Korea
- Occupation: Actress

Korean name
- Hangul: 이루비
- RR: I Rubi
- MR: I Rubi

Lee Ruby (Korean: 이루비; born in 2000) is a South Korean actress. She made her debut acting in Memorist (2020), and gained recognition by being cast as the main character in the popular web drama Love Revolution (2020).

== Career ==
Lee Ruby made her debut acting in Memorist (2020) and made her name known by being cast as the main character in the popular web drama Love Revolution (2020).

On September 10, 2020, she was selected as the advertising model for the naturalistic functional beauty brand Bonajour.

== Filmography ==
=== Television series ===
Year	Title	Role	Note(s)	Ref.
2020	Memorist		Debut acting	
2024	Knight Flower	Hwang Yi-kyung		
2024	Bad Memory Eraser	Cha Si-on		

=== Web series ===
Year	Title	Role	Ref.
2020	Love Revolution	Wang Ja-rim	
