= Duty After School =

2023 South Korean television series

- Promotional poster
- Hangul: 방과 후 전쟁활동
- Hanja: 放課後 戰爭活動
- Lit.: After School War Activities
- RR: Banggwa hu jeonjaeng hwaldong
- MR: Panggwa hu chŏnjaeng hwaltong
- Genre: Military sci-fi; Thriller; Dystopian; Teen drama
- Created by: Lee Nam-gyu
- Based on: Duty After School by Ha Il-kwon
- Developed by: Studio Dragon
- Written by: Yoon Soo
- Directed by: Sung Yong-il
- Starring: Shin Hyun-soo; Lee Soon-won; Im Se-mi; Kwon Eun-bin; Kim Ki-hae; Kim Min-chul; Kim So-hee; Kim Su-gyeom; Kim Jung-lan; Moon Sang-min; Shin Myung-sung; Shin Su-hyun; Shin Hye-ji; Ahn Da-eun; Ahn Do-gyu; Yeo Joo-ha; Oh Se-eun; Woo Min-gyu; Yoon Jong-bin; Lee Yeon; Ji Min-hyuk; Choi Moon-hee; Hong Sa-bin; Hwang Se-in
- Music by: Baek Eun-woo
- Country of origin: South Korea
- Original language: Korean
- No. of episodes: 10

Production
- Executive producers: Jang Jeong-do (CP); Song Jin-sun (CP); Park Ji-eun
- Producers: Kim Young-gyu; Kim Je-hyun; Lee Dong-gyu; Jung Da-hyung; Oh Eun-jee
- Cinematography: Pyo Sang-woo; Han Jung-hee
- Editor: Kim Soo-hyun
- Running time: 55–92 minutes
- Production companies: Studio Dragon; GTist

Original release
- Network: TVING
- Release: March 31 – April 21, 2023

Duty After School (Korean: 방과 후 전쟁활동) is a 2023 South Korean military sci-fi thriller dystopian teen drama television series created by Lee Nam-gyu, written by Yoon Soo and directed by Sung Yong-il. The series stars an ensemble cast including Shin Hyun-soo, Lee Soon-won, Im Se-mi, Kwon Eun-bin, Kim Ki-hae, Kim Min-chul, Kim So-hee, Kim Su-gyeom, Kim Jung-lan, Moon Sang-min, Shin Myung-sung, Shin Su-hyun, Shin Hye-ji, Ahn Da-eun, Ahn Do-gyu, Yeo Joo-ha, Oh Se-eun, Woo Min-gyu, Yoon Jong-bin, Lee Yeon, Ji Min-hyuk, Choi Moon-hee, Hong Sa-bin, and Hwang Se-in. Based on the webtoon of the same name by Ha Il-kwon, which was later serialized on Naver Webtoon, it follows students who are conscripted as cadets to combat mysterious purple alien objects that appear in Earth's skies and threaten humanity. It was released from March 31 to April 21, 2023, on TVING's Fridays at 16:00 (KST). It is also available for streaming on Viu and Viki in selected regions.

The series was divided into two parts: Part 1 was released on March 31, 2023, while Part 2 on April 21, 2023.

== Series overview ==
Part	Episodes	Originally released
1	6	March 31, 2023
2	4	April 21, 2023

== Synopsis ==
Duty After School tells the story of the senior students at Sungjin High School as they are conscripted to fight against the attack of a group of mysterious creatures shaped as spheres that have covered the sky in order from them to get extra credit in CSAT. Using their university admissions as a leverage the students are trained to get ahold of firearms and survival skills. These students manage to learn from Shin Hyun-soo as Lee Chun-ho, A lieutenant and the platoon commander for that very class.

== Cast ==
=== Main ===
- Shin Hyun-soo as Lee Chun-ho

A lieutenant and platoon commander of Class 3–2. He is initially firm with the students, but warms up to them and cares for them more than anyone else.

- Lee Soon-won as Kim Won-bin

A sergeant who is a faithful assistant to Chun-ho. Though he is 21 years old, he looks much older so he is teased by the students for his looks.

- Im Se-mi as Park Eun-young

The homeroom teacher of Class 3–2 who prioritizes the students' safety.

- Kwon Eun-bin as Yeon Bo-ra

A student of Class 3–2 with a frank and hot-tempered personality. Though she helps others, she frequently bullies Ae-seol.

- Kim Ki-hae as Kim Chi-yeol

A student of Class 3–2. He is introverted and has no special dreams or desired colleges. Although seemingly timid, he takes the lead at times in rescuing his friends. He has a crush on Na-ra.

- Kim Min-chul as Do Soo-cheol

A student of Class 3–2. He is best friends with Woo-taek, and also has a crush on Na-ra.

- Kim So-hee as Lee Soon-yi

A student of Class 3–2. She has a timid and soft-hearted personality.

- Kim Su-gyeom as Kwon Il-ha

A troublemaker student of Class 3–2 who does whatever he wants. He bullies Yeong-hun and later, Yeong-su.

- Kim Jung-lan as Park So-yoon

A student of Class 3–2.

- Moon Sang-min as Wang Tae-man

The mood maker student of Class 3–2.

- Shin Myung-sung as Im Woo-taek

A student in Class 3–2. He is best friends with Soo-cheol.

- Shin Su-hyun as Cha So-yeon

A student of Class 3–2. She has a crush on Chun-ho, the platoon commander.

- Shin Hye-ji as Choi Yeon-ju

A student of Class 3-2. She shows unexpected wit in the midst of war with her kind and altruistic personality, and silently takes care of her friends.

- Ahn Da-eun as Kim In-hye

A student of Class 3–2.

- Ahn Do-gyu as Kook Young-soo

A student of Class 3–2 who creates a conflict with his classmates with his selfish appearance of worrying about his safety even at a time of crisis. As a 'shop-obsessed man', he thinks that every minute and every second other than studying is a luxury. He is bullied by Il-ha.

- Yeo Joo-ha as Kim Yu-jung

The class president of Class 3–2. She tries to make rational decisions even in confusing situations.

- Oh Se-eun as Hong Jun-hee

The 'professional complainer' student of Class 3–2. She is selfish and stubborn and becomes a tension factor in the war.

- Woo Min-gyu as Kim Duk-joong

A military virtuoso of Class 3–2, and someone who likes to eat.

- Yoon Jong-bin as Jo Jang-soo

The vice-president of Class 3–2. He is courageous and takes after his father, who is a soldier.

- Lee Yeon as No Ae-seol

A student of Class 3–2 who is quiet and often bullied by Bo-ra. She is slower at her tasks and sometimes messes things up, but she has a good nature.

- Ji Min-hyuk as Jo Young-sin

A student of Class 3–2. He can escape crises by calmly and quickly grasping the situation.

- Choi Moon-hee as Lee Na-ra

A student of Class 3–2. She is quiet and appears cool. She also excels at her tasks, and is the sharpshooter of the team.

- Hong Sa-bin as Woo Hee-rak

The last rank student of Class 3–2.

- Hwang Se-in as Yu Ha-na

A student of Class 3–2. She is timid and cries easily. She listens to Bo-ra and sticks to her for support.

=== Supporting ===
- Noh Jong-hyun as Jang Young-hoon

A student of Class 3–2. He is focused on his studies, and appears to have no interest in making friends. He is bullied by Il-ha.

- Lee Jung-min as Seo Ja-yoon, the platoon instructor of Class 3–2.

=== Special appearances ===
- Shim So-young as Young-soo's mother
- Park Jung-yeon as Yoon-seo

A high school girl who survived in the attic.

- Park Jin-soo as Ji-min as a student survivor
- Yoo Jun as Jae-won as a student survivor
- Kim Do-yeon as Deok-joong's mother

== Production ==
=== Development ===
Studio Dragon together with director Sung Yong-il, who directed Class of Lies (2019), and writer Lee Nam-gyu, who wrote The Light in Your Eyes (2019), produced the popular webtoon Duty After School into a drama. Production begun with the goal of broadcasting in 2022.

According to Bloter, the series was scheduled to be included as TVING's original content and Studio Dragon considered the possibility that it would be included as a Netflix original series.

=== Casting ===
Shin Hyun-soo and Hwang Se-in confirmed their appearance for the series in August and October 2021, respectively.

In February 2023, the cast lineup and the release date of the series were revealed.

=== Filming ===
Principal photography began in August 2021 and ended in March 2022.

== Release ==
On March 8, 2023, it was reported that the first three episodes would release at once on the 31st.

On March 30, 2023, it was announced that Duty After School would be divided into two parts. Part 1 with the first six episodes was released on March 30, 2023, while Part 2 with the remaining three episodes was released on April 21, 2023.

== Awards and nominations ==
Name of the award ceremony, year presented, category, nominee of the award, and the result of the nomination
Award ceremony	Year	Category	Nominee / Work	Result	Ref.
APAN Star Awards	2023	Best New Actor	Kim Ki-hae	Nominated	
Asian Academy Creative Awards	2023	Best Visual or Special FX in TV Series or Feature Film (Korea)	Duty After School	Won	
Blue Dragon Series Awards	2023	Best New Actor	Kim Ki-hae	Nominated	
