= Under the Queen's Umbrella =

2022 South Korean television series

- Promotional poster
- Also known as: The Queen's Umbrella
- Hangul: 슈룹
- Lit.: Umbrella
- RR: Syurup
- MR: Syurup
- Genre: Period drama; Black comedy
- Created by: Studio Dragon (planning)
- Written by: Park Ba-ra
- Directed by: Kim Hyung-sik
- Starring: Kim Hye-soo; Kim Hae-sook; Choi Won-young
- Music by: Kim Joon-seok (Movie Closer); Jeong Se-rin (Movie Closer)
- Country of origin: South Korea
- Original language: Korean
- No. of episodes: 16

Production
- Executive producers: Yoo Sang-won; Shin Seon-joo (CP); Kim Seung-won (CP)
- Producers: Park Jin-hyung; Son Jae-seong
- Editor: Kim Na-young
- Running time: 73 minutes
- Production company: How Pictures

Original release
- Network: tvN
- Release: October 15 – December 4, 2022

Under the Queen's Umbrella (Korean: 슈룹; RR: Syurup) (Note: 슈룹〮 (Yale: syùlwúp), pronounced as /sjù.lúp/ The native title is a Middle Korean word for "umbrella", first attested in Hunminjeong-eum haerye in 1446. The middle dot before the second syllable (in 룹〮) indicates a high pitch contour, while the unmarked first syllable is pronounced with a low pitch contour.) is a 2022 South Korean television series starring Kim Hye-soo, Kim Hae-sook, and Choi Won-young. It aired on tvN from October 15 to December 4, 2022, every Saturday and Sunday at 21:10 (KST). It was released as a limited series on Netflix in selected regions on October 15.

The series was a commercial hit and became one of the highest-rated dramas in Korean cable television history. Under the Queen's Umbrella remained for eight weeks on Netflix's "Global Top 10" list of the most-watched non-English television titles.

== Synopsis ==
Set in a fictional era within the Joseon period, the series deals with the education of troublemaker princes who cause nuisance for the royal family.

== Cast ==
=== Main ===
- Kim Hye-soo as Queen Im Hwa-ryeong
  - Chaerin as young Im Hwa-ryeong
- Kim Hae-sook as Queen Dowager
- Choi Won-young as King Yi Ho
  - Choi Yoon-je as young Yi Ho

=== Supporting ===
==== Queen's children ====
- Bae In-hyuk as Crown Prince
  - Yang Hee-won as young Crown Prince
- Moon Sang-min as Grand Prince Seongnam / Yi Kang (personal name)
  - Song Ha-hyun as young Prince Seongnam
- Yoon Sang-hyeon as Grand Prince Muan / Yi Moon (personal name)
- Yoo Seon-ho as Grand Prince Gyeseong / Yi Hwan (personal name)
- Park Ha-jun as Grand Prince Ilyeong / Yi Yul (personal name)

==== Royal consorts ====
- Ok Ja-yeon as First Junior Consort Hwang
- Kim Ga-eun as Third Senior Consort Tae
- Woo Jung-won as First Junior Consort Go

==== Royal consorts' sons ====
- Kang Chan-hee as Prince Uiseong
- Kim Min-gi as Prince Bogum
- Moon Seong-hyun as Prince Simso

==== People in the palace ====
- Kim Eui-sung as Chief State Councillor Hwang Won-hyeong
- Jang Hyun-sung as Minister of Military Affairs Yoon Soo-kwang

==== Others ====
- Oh Ye-ju as Yoon Cheong-ha
- Jeon Hye-won as Cho-wol
- Seo Yi-sook as Deposed Queen Yoon

=== Extended ===
- Shin Soo-jeong as Second Senior Consort Kim
- Song Young-ah as Second Junior Consort Choi
- Lee Ha-young as Fourth Senior Consort Moon
- Lee Hwa-kyum as Fourth Junior Consort Ok
- Lee So-hee as Special Court Lady Park
- Shin Ian as Prince Yeongmin
- Hong Jae-min as Prince Hodong
- Kim Young-jae as Chief Royal Secretary Min Seung-yun
- Lee Jung-eun as Court Lady Nam
- Yoo Yeon as Court Lady Oh
- Park Jun-myeon as Court Lady Shin
- Kim Jae-bum as Physician Kwon / Yi Ik-hyeon (real name)
  - Cha Sung-je as young Yi Ik-hyeon
- Kwon Hae-hyo as Master Toji / Yoo Sang-uk (real name)
- Kim Seung-soo as Park Gyeong-woo
- Han Dong-hee as Crown Princess Min
- Seo Woo-jin as Grandson Royal
- Tae Won-seok as Seo Ham-deok
- Yoon Seul as Mak-ryeo
- Jo Ah-young as Min Seung-yun's eldest daughter
- Kim Jung-ho as Royal Physician Cho Guk-yeong
- Ha Dong-joon as Personnel Officer Lee Jo-jeon-rang

=== Special appearances ===
- Jung Ji-hoon as a passerby
- Ahn Yong-joon as the representative of Sungkyunkwan scholars
- Park Hyo-joo as a nursemaid
- Jung Soon-won

== Production ==
Most of the scenes were filmed at Mungyeong Saejae Open Set, some were filmed in Jeonju Hanok Village. Lead actress Kim Hye-soo filmed her parts from April 2 to November 20, 2022.

On November 21, 2022, it was revealed that actor Moon Sang-min suffered facial injury in the lower part of his left eye while filming an action scene at the end of October. He underwent surgery and returned to the set after a few days.

== Viewership ==
Under the Queen's Umbrella : South Korea viewers per episode (millions)

Season	Episode number															
Season	1	2	3	4	5	6	7	8	9	10	11	12	13	14	15	16
1	1.846	2.039	1.682	2.286	1.750	2.690	2.104	2.873	2.426	3.015	2.599	3.247	2.935	3.389	3.047	4.049

Source: Audience measurement performed nationwide by Nielsen Korea.

Average TV viewership ratings
Ep.	Original broadcast date	Average audience share (Nielsen Korea)	
Ep.	Original broadcast date	Nationwide	Seoul
1	October 15, 2022	7.649% (1st)	8.668% (1st)
2	October 16, 2022	9.062% (1st)	10.259% (1st)
3	October 22, 2022	6.980% (1st)	7.307% (1st)
4	October 23, 2022	9.471% (1st)	10.065% (1st)
5	October 29, 2022	7.751% (1st)	8.334% (1st)
6	October 30, 2022	11.285% (1st)	12.008% (1st)
7	November 5, 2022	9.365% (1st)	9.590% (1st)
8	November 6, 2022	11.821% (1st)	13.043% (1st)
9	November 12, 2022	9.993% (1st)	11.015% (1st)
10	November 13, 2022	12.296% (1st)	13.391% (1st)
11	November 19, 2022	10.842% (1st)	11.548% (1st)
12	November 20, 2022	13.415% (1st)	14.201% (1st)
13	November 26, 2022	12.851% (1st)	14.012% (1st)
14	November 27, 2022	14.100% (1st)	14.786% (1st)
15	December 3, 2022	13.353% (1st)	14.562% (1st)
16	December 4, 2022	16.852% (1st)	18.159% (1st)
Average		11.068%	11.934%
In the table above, the blue numbers represent the lowest ratings and the red numbers represent the highest ratings.; This series aired on a cable channel/pay TV which normally has a relatively smaller audience compared to free-to-air TV/public broadcasters (KBS, SBS, MBC and EBS).

== Accolades ==
Award ceremony	Year	Category	Nominee	Result	Ref.
Baeksang Arts Awards	2023	Best Actress – Television	Kim Hye-soo	Nominated	
Baeksang Arts Awards	2023	Best New Actor – Television	Moon Sang-min	Won	
