= Bad Memory Eraser =

2024 South Korean television series

- Promotional poster
- Hangul: 나쁜 기억 지우개
- Hanja: 나쁜 記憶 지우개
- RR: Nappeun gieok jiugae
- MR: Nappŭn kiŏk chiugae
- Genre: Coming-of-age
- Written by: Jung Eun-young
- Directed by: Yoon Ji-hoon; Kim Na-young
- Starring: Kim Jae-joong; Jin Se-yeon; Lee Jong-won; Yang Hye-ji
- Music by: Moon Seung-nam
- Country of origin: South Korea
- Original language: Korean
- No. of episodes: 16

Production
- Running time: 60 minutes
- Production companies: Studio Jidam; Chorokbaem Media; Kim Jong-hak Production

Original release
- Network: MBN
- Release: August 2 – September 21, 2024

Bad Memory Eraser (Korean: 나쁜 기억 지우개) is a 2024 South Korean television series written by Jung Eun-young, directed by Yoon Ji-hoon and Kim Na-young, and starring Kim Jae-joong, Jin Se-yeon, Lee Jong-won, and Yang Hye-ji. It aired on MBN from August 2, to September 21, 2024, every Friday and Saturday at 21:40 (KST). It is also available for streaming on Netflix, TVING, Wavve in South Korea, on U-Next in Japan, and on Viki in selected regions.

== Synopsis ==
Bad Memory Eraser tells the story of four coming-of-age characters namely Lee Goon, Kyung Joo-yeon, Lee Shin, and Sae Yan, finding their true selves and healing their pain through love.

== Cast and characters ==
=== Main ===
- Kim Jae-joong as Lee Goon
- Jin Se-yeon as Kyung Joo-yeon
- Lee Jong-won as Lee Shin
- Yang Hye-ji as Sae Yan

=== Supporting ===
- Jang Eui-soo as Nam Jin
- Kim Kwang-kyu as Han Dong-chil
- Jung Joo-hyun
- Shin Eun-jung as Song Mi-seon
- Kim Jae-yong as Yoon Te-oh
- Bae Hae-sun as Jo Yeon-il
- Lee Ruby as Cha Si-on

=== Cameo ===
- Qri (T-ara) as Lee Shin

== Release ==
Originally, it was reported that Bad Memory Eraser would premiere in 2023 but has been delayed. Maeil Broadcasting Network confirmed that the series would broadcast on their channel on August 2, 2024, every Friday and Saturday at 21:40 (KST). It is also available to stream on Netflix, TVING, Wavve, U-Next, and Viki.

== Viewership ==
Bad Memory Eraser : South Korea viewers per episode (thousands)

Season	Episode number															
Season	1	2	3	4	5	6	7	8	9	10	11	12	13	14	15	16
1	N/A	N/A	N/A	386	N/A	N/A	N/A	N/A	N/A	N/A	N/A	N/A	N/A	N/A	N/A	N/A

Source: Audience measurement performed nationwide by Nielsen Korea.

Average TV viewership ratings (nationwide)
Ep.	Original broadcast date	Average audience share (Nielsen Korea)
1	August 2, 2024	1.047% (25th)
2	August 3, 2024	0.938% (25th)
3	August 9, 2024	1.669% (19th)
4	August 10, 2024	1.543% (10th)
5	August 16, 2024	0.526% (43rd)
6	August 17, 2024	0.732% (35th)
7	August 23, 2024	0.418% (48th)
8	August 24, 2024	0.409% (47th)
9	August 30, 2024	0.272% (62nd)
10	August 31, 2024	0.307% (53rd)
11	September 6, 2024	0.408% (48th)
12	September 7, 2024	0.293% (56th)
13	September 13, 2024	0.364% (51st)
14	September 14, 2024	0.478% (35th)
15	September 20, 2024	0.384% (50th)
16	September 21, 2024	0.463% (43rd)
Average		0.641%
In the table above, the blue numbers represent the lowest ratings and the red numbers represent the highest ratings.; N/A denotes ratings that were not published.; This drama airs on a cable channel/pay TV which normally has a relatively smaller audience compared to free-to-air TV/public broadcasters (KBS, SBS, MBC, and EBS).
