= Murderer (2014 film) =

2014 South Korean film

- Directed by: Lee Ki-wook
- Story by: Lee Ki-wook
- Starring: Ma Dong-seok
- Release date: 16 January 2014
- Country: South Korea

Murderer (살인자) is a 2014 South Korean thriller film directed and written by Lee Ki-wook. The film was theatrically released on 16 January 2014.

It revolves around Joo-hyeop, a secret serial killer, who resolves to eliminate the only person who knows his true identity — his son's newfound friend.

== Premise ==
In a quiet countryside, Joo-hyeop, concealing his dark past as a serial killer, watches anxiously as his son befriends a girl who unwittingly discovers his true identity. Fearing exposure, Joo-hyeop makes a chilling decision: the girl must be silenced to protect his fragile new life with his son.

== Cast ==
- Ma Dong-seok
- Ahn Do-gyu
- Kim Hyun-soo
- Kim Min-seo

== Production ==
The film is based on the real case of the serial killer Kang Ho-soon.

Lee Ki-Wook, however, explained at the release of the film: "I wasn't trying to tell a story about a murderer. The extreme metaphor of a bad adult was a murderer. Above all, I wanted to tell the story of innocent children who have to grow up under bad adults. This is a movie that started with the question of how an innocent son with a murderer father can accept his fate and how he can escape that fate."

== Reception ==
The film mainly attracted attention in relation to the real events depicted, according to The Chosun Ibo, that commented "Ironically, the role of the murderer in Murderer was played by Ma Dong-seok, who had mainly played detective roles so far."

"Based on the motif of the contradictory fatherly love of wanting to remain a good father to his son while committing a cruel crime, the film was completed with the even more powerful setting that the only girl who knows the identity of the killer happens to be his son's most precious friend. Murderer thus attracts attention by presenting a different perspective on serial killers", stated WowTv Korea.
