= Mr. Zoo: The Missing VIP =

2020 South Korean comedy-drama film

- Theatrical release poster
- Hangul: 미스터 주: 사라진 VIP
- RR: Miseuteo Ju: sarajin VIP
- MR: Misŭt'ŏ Chu: sarajin VIP
- Directed by: Kim Tae-yoon
- Written by: Kim Tae-yoon
- Produced by: Nam Hyun-woo
- Starring: Lee Sung-min; Kim Seo-hyung; Bae Jung-nam; Shin Ha-kyun
- Cinematography: Kim Jung-woo
- Edited by: Moon Se-gyung
- Music by: Jo Sung-woo
- Production company: Leeyang Film
- Distributed by: Megabox Plus M; Little Big Pictures
- Release date: January 22, 2020
- Running time: 113 minutes
- Country: South Korea
- Language: Korean
- Box office: US$4.4 million

Mr. Zoo: The Missing VIP (Korean: 미스터 주: 사라진 VIP) is a 2020 South Korean comedy-drama film written and directed by Kim Tae-yoon. It stars Lee Sung-min, Kim Seo-hyung, Bae Jung-nam and Shin Ha-kyun and was released on January 22, 2020.

== Plot ==
After he hurt his head in an accident, top National Security (NIS) agent Joo Tae-joo is suddenly able to talk to animals. He meets a German shepherd who might be able to help him with his current case.

An accident occurred while guarding the VIP panda 'Ming-Ming', who came as a special envoy from China. In the accident, Tae-Joo injured his head and the VIP disappeared. Fortunately, Tae-Joo is fine, but he is experiencing strange symptoms. That was when the voices of the animals he hated so much began to be heard.

The pets displayed in the supermarket, the fish in the fishbowl of the National Intelligence Service office, and the voices of animals of all kinds were heard, and confusion was about to come when he met Ali, a wandering military dog. Tae-Joo learns that Ali has a clue to the case, and eventually uses his strange symptoms to conduct a joint investigation with Ali.

== Cast ==
=== Main ===
- Lee Sung-min as Joo Tae-joo
- Kim Seo-hyung as Min Soo-hee
- Bae Jung-nam as Man-sik
- Shin Ha-kyun as Ali, a German Shepherd (voice)

=== Supporting ===
- Kal So-won as Seo-yeon
- David Lee McInnis as Dmitry
- Yoo In-na as Ming-Ming, a Panda (voice)
- Kim Soo-mi as Clucky, a Parrot (voice)
- Lee Sun-kyun as Black goat (voice)
- Lee Jung-eun as Gorilla (voice)
- Lee Soon-jae as Hamster (voice)
- Kim Bo-sung as Pug (voice)
- Joon Park as Eagle (voice)
- Lee Byung-joon as Porcupine (voice)
- Oh Dal-su as Boar (voice)
- Kim Young-jae as Hwang Bo-sung
- Park Hyuk-kwon as Dr. Baek Hoon

=== Special appearances ===
- Park Chul-min as bus driver
- Lee Soo-kyung as So-jin
