= Recipe for Farewell =

2022 South Korean web series

- Promotional poster
- Hangul: 오늘은 좀 매울지도 몰라
- RR: Oneureun jom maeuljido molla
- MR: Onŭrŭn chom maeuljido molla
- Genre: Melodrama
- Based on: It Might Be a Little Spicy Today by Kang Chang-rae
- Written by: Lee Ho-Jae
- Directed by: Lee Ho-Jae
- Starring: Han Suk-kyu; Kim Seo-hyung
- Country of origin: South Korea
- Original language: Korean
- No. of episodes: 12

Production
- Running time: 30 minutes
- Production companies: Acemaker MovieWorks; Beyond J

Original release
- Network: Watcha; Channel A
- Release: December 1, 2022 – January 5, 2023

Recipe for Farewell (Korean: 오늘은 좀 매울지도 몰라; lit. '"It Might Be a Little Spicy Today"') is a 12-part South Korean drama that was aired on Watcha from December 1, 2022, to January 5, 2023. It stars Han Suk-kyu and Kim Seo-hyung. The story is based on the autobiographical essay book It Might Be a Little Spicy Today (오늘은 좀 매울지도 몰라) by Kang Chang-rae, which was published in 2018.

The series aired on television network Channel A from February 7 to March 14, 2023, every Tuesday at 22:30 (KST) for 6 episodes. It peaked at No. 1 on Watcha's list of the most popular series by viewership.

== Synopsis ==
Jung Da-jung owns a small book publishing company in Seoul. Her estranged husband Kang Chang-wook works as a translator and lecturer in the humanities, but has held ambitions to be a writer. Chang-wook moves back in with his wife and teenage son, Kang Jae-ho, at her request after she is diagnosed with terminal bowel cancer, though their son (who hasn't yet been told about his mother's condition) dislikes the idea.

Due to her condition, she has difficulties eating, but asks Chang-wook to cook for her every day, even though previously the only thing he knew how to cook was ramen. Chang-wook begins to cook for his wife, taking recipes from the internet, and begins an online blog recording his progress - which is eagerly followed by his students. He is advised on ingredients by an empathetic local grocer, Yang Su-won. He cooks the food with great care, his cooking skills improve immeasurably, and Da-jung is able to eat it. As her condition deteriorates, he adjusts the cooking to enable her to still eat something.

His actions help rekindle a close relationship with his wife and son. Following her death, Da-jung passes ownership of the publishing company to her long-term editor, Choi Min-young, who passes on to Chang-wook a proposal for a book devised by Da-jung based on his blog.

== Cast ==
- Han Suk-kyu as Kang Chang-wook (translator/lecturer)
- Kim Seo-hyung as Jung Da-jung (publisher)
- Jin Ho-eun as Kang Jae-ho (their son, student)
- Yang Kyung-won as Yang Su-won (local grocer)
- Cho Yu-jung as Shin Yeo-jin (Kang Jae-Ho's girlfriend)
- Jeon Yeo-jin as Jung Da-sol (Jung Da-Jung's sister, a nurse)
- Jung Min-gyul as Choi Min-young (publishing editor)
- Park Soo-jin as Lim Hye-young (author and Jung Da-Jung's friend)
- Kim Seung-tae as Jung Da-jung's doctor

== Awards and nominations ==
Year	Award	Category	Recipient(s)	Result	Ref.
2023	2nd Blue Dragon Series Awards	Best Actress	Kim Seo-hyung	Nominated	
2023	21st Director's Cut Awards	Best Director in the Series	Lee Ho-jae	Nominated	
2023	21st Director's Cut Awards	Best Screenplay in the Series	Lee Ho-jae	Nominated	
2023	21st Director's Cut Awards	Best Actor in the Series	Han Suk-kyu	Nominated	
