= Shadow Detective =

2022 South Korean television series

- Hangul: 형사록
- Lit.: Criminal Record
- RR: Hyeongsarok
- MR: Hyŏngsarok
- Genre: Crime thriller
- Written by: Lim Chang-se; Hwang Seol-hun; Son Jeong-woo
- Directed by: Han Dong-hwa
- Starring: Lee Sung-min; Jin Goo; Kyung Soo-jin; Lee Hak-joo; Jung Jin-young; Kim Shin-rok
- Country of origin: South Korea
- Original language: Korean
- No. of seasons: 2
- No. of episodes: 16

Production
- Running time: 47–62 minutes
- Production companies: Studio Dragon; Slingshot Studios

Original release
- Network: Disney+
- Release: October 26, 2022 – July 26, 2023

Shadow Detective (Korean: 형사록) is a 2022 South Korean crime thriller television series directed by Han Dong-hwa, starring Lee Sung-min as a veteran detective who becomes a murder suspect after receiving a phone call. The series co-stars Jin Goo, Kyung Soo-jin, Lee Hak-joo, Jung Jin-young, and Kim Shin-rok. It premiered on Disney+ on October 26, 2022. In November 2022, the series was renewed for a second season, which was released on July 5, 2023.

== Series overview ==
| Season | Episodes | Originally released | |
| Season | Episodes | First released | Last released |
|---|---|---|---|
| 1 | 8 | October 26, 2022 | November 16, 2022 |
| 2 | 8 | July 5, 2023 | July 26, 2023 |

== Synopsis ==
Detective Taek-rok, who is nearing retirement, receives a threatening phone call and finds himself framed for murder. The mysterious caller, who calls himself a friend, challenges Taek-rok to a twisted game, ordering him to reinvestigate the cases he once handled. To catch the culprit, Taek-rok revisits his long and difficult life with determination. As he follows the trail, he comes face to face with a shocking truth.

== Cast ==
=== Main ===
- Lee Sung-min as Kim Taek-rok
- Jin Goo as Guk Jin-han (season 1)
- Kyung Soo-jin as Lee Seong-ah
- Lee Hak-joo as Son Kyung-cheon
- Jung Jin-young as Choi Do-hyung (season 2)
- Kim Shin-rok as Yeon Joo-hyun (season 2)

=== Supporting ===
==== Geumo Police Station ====
- Kim Hong-pa as Seo Gwang-su
- Kim Tae-hoon as Woo Hyun-seok
- Yoo Seung-mok as Bae Young-doo
- Kim Min-jae as Han Ki-yong
- Jung Hae-kyun as Baek Seong-il

==== People around Kim Taek-rok ====
- Seo Jeong-yeon as Oh Hye-seong
- Kim Jae-bum as Yang Ki-tae
- Ko Kyu-pil as Gong Ha-neul
- Hyun Bong-sik as Gu Dong-beom

==== Kim Taek-rok's family ====
- Kim Soo-jin as Shin Jeong-ae
- Jung Yi-ju as Kim Ji-woo

==== Drug Organization ====
- Yoon Je-moon as Cheon Ki-deok
- Oh Dae-hwan as Ma Sang-goo
- Geum Gwang-san as Chung-bok
- Kwon Hyuk-bum as Antenna

==== People in Geumo ====
- Song Young-chang as An Hyung-woo
- Jang Seong-beom as An Ju-yong
- Ahn Nae-sang as Jang Seong-tae

==== People around Lee Young-ho ====
- Joo Jin-mo as Lee Young-ho
- Choi Byung-mo as Cha Kyung-pil
- Jung In-gi as Won Jae-gu
- Ji Seung-hyun as Woo Jang-ik

==== Others ====
- Jung Hee-tae as Lee Jeong-beom
- Woo Mi-hwa as Kim Jin-seon
- Cho Young-jin as Han Jong-seok

== Production ==
The series was announced on Disney+. The series was initially titled as Old Detective but later changed as Shadow Detective. The principal photography of the series commenced in October 2022. The trailer of the series was released on October 11, 2022.

== Reception ==
Pierce Conran of South China Morning Post graded both seasons with 3 1/2 out of 5 stars. Rhian Daly of NME rated the season with 4 out of 5 stars in her review.

== Awards and nominations ==
Name of the award ceremony, year presented, category, nominee(s) of the award, and the result of the nomination
| Year | Award ceremony | Category | Nominee | Result | Ref. |
|---|---|---|---|---|---|
| 2023 | Blue Dragon Series Awards | Best Actor | Lee Sung-min | Nominated | |
| 2023 | Blue Dragon Series Awards | Best Supporting Actress | Kyung Soo-jin | Nominated | |
| 2023 | Asia Contents Awards & Global OTT Awards | Best OTT Original | Shadow Detective | Nominated | |
| 2023 | Asia Contents Awards & Global OTT Awards | Best Supporting Actress | Kyung Soo-jin | Nominated | |
| 2023 | Korea Drama Awards | Grand Prize (Daesang) | Lee Sung-min | Won | |
| 2023 | Grand Bell Awards | Best Actor in a Series | Lee Sung-min | Nominated | |
| 2023 | APAN Star Awards | Top Excellence Award, Actor in a Miniseries | Lee Sung-min | Nominated | |
| 2023 | APAN Star Awards | Excellence Acting Award, Actor | Lee Hak-joo | Nominated | |
