= Love Revolution (web series) =

2020 South Korean web series

- Promotional poster
- Hangul: 연애혁명
- RR: Yeonae hyeongmyeong
- MR: Yŏnae hyŏngmyŏng
- Genre: Romantic comedy; Teen drama
- Based on: Love Revolution by 232
- Developed by: Kakao M Digital Content Studio
- Screenplay by: Kwak Kyung-yoon
- Directed by: Seo Joo-wan
- Starring: Park Ji-hoon; Lee Ruby; Kim Young-hoon; Jung Da-eun; Im Da-young; Ko Chan-bin; Ahn Do-gyu
- No. of episodes: 30

Production
- Executive producers: Lee Young-suk (Kakao M); You Jung-hoon (Merry Christmas)
- Producer: Song Jay-young (Kakao M)
- Running time: 20 mins
- Production companies: Kakao M; Merry Christmas (Note: A subsidiary of Studio Santa Claus Entertainment (formerly Huayi Brothers Korea))

Original release
- Network: KakaoTV; SERIESon
- Release: September 1 – December 27, 2020

Love Revolution (Korean: 연애혁명; RR: Yeonae hyeongmyeong) is a South Korean web series starring Park Ji-hoon, Lee Ruby, Kim Young-hoon, Jung Da-eun, Im Da-young, Ko Chan-bin and Ahn Do-gyu. Based on the popular Naver webtoon of the same name, it aired on KakaoTV and Naver series every Thursday and Sunday for 30 episodes, starting from September 1 to December 27, 2020.

It is also available exclusively with multi-languages subtitles on iQIYI in South East Asia, Taiwan, Hong Kong, and Macau, streaming at the same time in South Korea, and on Viki for other countries.

== Synopsis ==
17-year-old Gong Joo-young (Park Ji-hoon), a cute and lovable high school student, falls deeply in love at first sight with the pretty but standoffish Wang Ja-rim (Lee Ruby). Thinking they are destined for each other, Joo-young perseveres in winning her heart, while Ja-rim is almost always annoyed with his gaudy displays of affection.

== Cast ==
=== Main cast ===
- Park Ji-hoon as Gong Joo-young

a student of Class 1-2 of Isam Information High School; Ja-rim's boyfriend. An outgoing and jolly boy, Joo-young falls deeply in love with Ja-rim at first sight, and he fancifully surmises that he and Ja-rim are destined to be together on the premise of the many trivial circumstances surrounding them. Through his sincere, albeit gaudy, displays of affection, he perseveres in winning Ja-rim's heart despite her apparent coldness towards him.

- Lee Ruby as Wang Ja-rim

a student of Class 1-3 of Isam Information High School; Joo-young's girlfriend. In contrast to Joo-young, Ja-rim has a reticent and standoffish personality. She is also pretty and is popular among her peers. She is annoyed by Joo-young's advances though she never hates him. After weeks of ignoring Joo-young, she finally accepts him as her boyfriend. She insists that Joo-young not be noisy, showy and intimately close with her, though her temperament towards him slowly softens as time passes.

- Kim Young-hoon as Lee Kyung-woo

a student of Class 1-3 of Isam Information High School; Joo-young's best friend. A popular student among their peers, Kyung-woo has long bangs that covers his left eye. He jokes around and is friendly despite his cold and sharp appearance. He later harbors feelings for Ja-rim, but, for Joo-young's sake, he hides it and goes out instead with Ye-seul.

- Jung Da-eun as Yang Min-ji

a student of Class 1-3 of Isam Information High School; Ja-rim's best friend. Min-ji secretly helps Joo-young win Ja-rim's heart. She harbors feelings towards Kyung-woo.

- Im Da-young as Oh Ah-ram

a student of Class 1-3 of Isam Information High School; Ja-rim's best friend. Despite her love for food, Ah-ram is athletic and skilled at fighting.

- Ko Chan-bin as Kim Byung-hoon

a student of Class 1-2 of Isam Information High School; Joo-young's close friend. Byung-hoon has a cheerful personality and is the mood-maker among their friends.

- Ahn Do-gyu as Ahn Kyung-min

a student of Class 1-3 of Isam Information High School; Joo-young's close friend. Kyung-min is a bespectacled boy who also tends to joke around.

=== Supporting cast ===
- Kim Seung-hee as Hong Jin-hee

a student of Class 1-3 of Isam Information High School and Ja-rim's close friend.

- Kim Dong-hyun as Dokgo Moon

Dean of Isam Information High School and homeroom teacher of Class 1-2.

- Kim Joong-don as Cho Yeon-sa

homeroom teacher of Class 1-3 of Isam Information High School.

- Kim Su-gyeom as Namgoong Ji-soo

Ah-ram's junior athlete at the fitness center. Ji-soo has a crush on Ah-ram.

- Lee Seo-yeon as Wang Byeol-lim

Ja-rim's younger sister

- Lee Se-hee as Jang Hae-ri

a senior student at Isam Information High School who attempts to seduce Joo-young away from Ja-rim

- Kwak Hee-joo as Jung Sang-hoon

Joo-young and Kyung-woo's middle school acquaintance. Sang-hoon has a crush on Min-ji.

- Nam Kyu-hee as Bang Ye-seul

a student of Isam Information High School and Kyung-woo's former girlfriend. Ye-seul has a crush on Kyung-woo, and she becomes his girlfriend not knowing his true feelings. She breaks up with Kyung-woo when she realizes he does not truly love her.

- Kim Young-jae as Choi Jung-woo

a worker in a gaming shop. Jung-woo courted Ja-rim when she was in middle school.

- Jo Yoon-su as Park Soo-jin

=== Special appearance ===
- Yoo Byung-jae as Yang Ho

the school nurse of Isam Information High School

- Park Chae-rin as Nam Yu-ri

Kyung-woo's former girlfriend in middle school.

- Choi Su-rin as Kyung-woo's mother

== Episodes ==
The following table contains the episodes of the series:

No.	Title	Directed by	Written by	Original release date
1	"A Princess and a Prince... We are Destined for Each Other?"; Transliteration: "Gongjuwa wangja, urin unmyeong(?)iya" (Korean: 공주와 왕자, 우린 운명(?)이야)	Seo Joo-wan	Kwak Kyung-yoon	September 1, 2020
On the first day of school, high school freshman Joo-young falls deeply in love at first sight with the pretty but aloof Ja-rim and thinks they are destined for one another.
2	"Love Is... All About Timing"; Transliteration: "Sarangeun... taimingiji?!" (Korean: 사랑은... 타이밍이지?!)	Seo Joo-wan	Kwak Kyung-yoon	September 3, 2020
Joo-young surprises Ja-rim with loads of lollipops on White Day. Ja-rim gets annoyed as Joo-young keeps on following her and asking for her number.
3	"What Happened on the Day of the Retreat"; Transliteration: "Geunal suryeonhoe-eseo saenggin il" (Korean: 그날 수련회에서 생긴 일)	Seo Joo-wan	Kwak Kyung-yoon	September 10, 2020
Joo-young, Kyung-woo and Byung-hoon prepare for a dance number at the school retreat talent show. When students arrive at the retreat's venue, Joo-young suddenly goes missing.
4	"The Confession at the Retreat"; Transliteration: "Suryeonhoe gobaek (Go Back) sageon" (Korean: 수련회 고백(GO BACK) 사건)	Seo Joo-wan	Kwak Kyung-yoon	September 17, 2020
Joo-young publicly confesses to Ja-rim at the talent show.
5	"Don't Sympathize With Me"; Transliteration: "Nal dongjeonghaji maseyo" (Korean: 날 동정하지 마세요)	Seo Joo-wan	Kwak Kyung-yoon	September 24, 2020
Joo-young overhears Ja-rim telling her friends she went along with Joo-young's public confession because she pitied him. Hurt by her words, Joo-young keeps on whining to his friends not to pity him.
6	"The Outcome of a "Let's Date" on Rose Day"; Transliteration: "Rojeudei 'sagwija'ui gyeolmareun?" (Korean: 로즈데이 '사귀자'의 결말은?)	Seo Joo-wan	Kwak Kyung-yoon	October 1, 2020
Joo-young decides to formally confess to Ja-rim and ask her to be his girlfriend on Rose Day. A female senior tries to stop Joo-young from going out with Ja-rim.
7	"They Say Your Grades Fall When You Start Dating"; Transliteration: "Yeonaehamyeon seongjeogi tteoreojindaneunde" (Korean: 연애하면 성적이 떨어진다는데♥)	Seo Joo-wan	Kwak Kyung-yoon	October 8, 2020
Joo-young is in ecstasy when Ja-rim finally accepts him as her boyfriend, but she remains as cold as before. Ja-rim flat out rejects Joo-young's date plans and reminds him of their upcoming exams.
8	Transliteration: "Seounhami ssahyeottda. Uri sagwineun sai maja?" (Korean: 서운함이 쌓였다. 우리 사귀는 사이 맞아?)	Seo Joo-wan	Kwak Kyung-yoon	October 15, 2020
Joo-young manages to get angry at Ja-rim and complains for being treated so badly.
9	"An Unexpected Date, An Unexpected Party"; Transliteration: "Tteutbakkui deiteu, tteutbakkui pati" (Korean: 뜻밖의 데이트, 뜻밖의 파티)	Seo Joo-wan	Kwak Kyung-yoon	October 18, 2020
Kyung-woo's friends discover that he is working in a café and is popular among female customers. They pay him a visit one day, unknowing that it is Byung-hoon's birthday. Byung-hoon innocently assumes they are preparing a surprise for him.
10	"What Happened in the Valley"; Transliteration: "Gyegogeseo saenggin il" (Korean: 계곡에서 생긴 일)	Seo Joo-wan	Kwak Kyung-yoon	October 22, 2020
Joo-young, Ja-rim and their friends go on a trip to Byung-hoon's countryside home. When they get thirsty while harvesting chilies, Joo-young goes to fetch water but returns drunk after not being able to stop himself from drinking alcohol.
11	Transliteration: "Sseomi heureuneun gyegogyeohaeng" (Korean: 썸이 흐르는 계곡여행)	Seo Joo-wan	Kwak Kyung-yoon	October 25, 2020
Before going home, Joo-young, Ja-rim and their friends clean Byung-hoon's grandparents' house and have fun for the last time. Ja-rim tries to make hangover soup for Joo-young.
12	"Happy Joo-young Day"; Transliteration: "Happy juyeong day" (Korean: HAPPY 주영 DAY)	Seo Joo-wan	Kwak Kyung-yoon	October 29, 2020
Joo-young goes out for a date with Ja-rim, who is unknowing that it is Joo-young's birthday.
13	"Humidity at 99%, A Bad Feeling"; Transliteration: "Seupdo 99% bulgilhan yegam" (Korean: 습도 99% 불길한 예감)	Seo Joo-wan	Kwak Kyung-yoon	November 1, 2020
Joo-young asks Ja-rim to cheer for him in a recreational basketball match with Jung-woo. Ja-rim meets Jung-woo and runs away in surprise. A misunderstanding ensues and Ja-rim finds it hard to explain to Joo-young the truth of her past with Jung-woo.
14	"It's Sunny After The Rain. We Need To Talk."; Transliteration: "Bi on dwi malgeum. Uriegen daehwaga piryohae." (Korean: 비 온 뒤 맑음. 우리에겐 대화가 필요해)	Seo Joo-wan	Kwak Kyung-yoon	November 5, 2020
Joo-young receives a call from Min-ji. The day after, Joo-young goes to play basketball with Jung-woo in casual attire and behaving strangely.
15	"Save every little bit to love Ja-rim: Discount Date"; Transliteration: "Tikkeul moa jarim sarang: Diseukaunteu deiteu" (Korean: 티끌 모아 자림 사랑♡ 디스카운트 데이트)	Seo Joo-wan	Kwak Kyung-yoon	November 8, 2020
Joo-young has an upcoming weekend date with Ja-rim but he discovers that his allowance is running out.
16	"Festival"; Transliteration: "Chukje" (Korean: 축제)	Seo Joo-wan	Kwak Kyung-yoon	November 12, 2020
In the school festival, Class 1-3 becomes a customer magnet with their café and picture taking with the most famous students of their class, Kyung-woo and Ja-rim. Byung-hoon, Joo-young and their classmates carries out a hilarious plan to steal Class 1-3's customers and save Class 1-2's face.
17	"Kyung-woo Is Missing"; Transliteration: "Gyeongu eomneun sanghwang" (Korean: 경우 없는 상황)	Seo Joo-wan	Kwak Kyung-yoon	November 15, 2020
After an encounter with middle school acquaintances, Kyung-woo suddenly goes missing for two days. He returns to school but has become hostile to Joo-young. To find out what could have happened to him, Joo-young and the remaining friends talk about Kyung-woo and Joo-young's middle school past.
18	"Kyung-woo's Story"; Transliteration: "Gyeongu iyagi" (Korean: 경우 이야기)	Seo Joo-wan	Kwak Kyung-yoon	November 19, 2020
Kyung-woo realizes he mistakenly thought Joo-young betrayed him by spilling the truth of his long bangs. He reflects on their friendship and apologizes to him.
19	"Shy boy"	Seo Joo-wan	Kwak Kyung-yoon	November 22, 2020
Ja-rim accidentally sees Joo-young naked. Joo-young becomes embarrassed and stays away from Ja-rim. Kyung-woo starts having feelings for Ja-rim but he goes to hang out with Ye-seul instead.
20	"When Kyung-woo Studies"; Transliteration: "Gyeonguga gongbureul haneun gyeongu" (Korean: 경우가 공부를 하는 경우)	Seo Joo-wan	Kwak Kyung-yoon	November 26, 2020
Class 1-3 remains in last place during exams because of Kyung-woo's low scores owing to his laziness in studying. Kyung-woo's friends and the entire Class 1-3 force him to study in order to save the class' face.
21	"How tall are you?"	Seo Joo-wan	Kwak Kyung-yoon	November 29, 2020
Joo-young, the shortest among their circle of friends, notices Ja-rim's growth spurt and worries she might overtake him. He scrambles to gain height by doing all sorts of exercises and eating height-related foods.
22	"Ah-ram's Fleeting Glory"; Transliteration: "Ramgailmong" (Korean: 람가일몽)	Seo Joo-wan	Kwak Kyung-yoon	December 3, 2020
The students of Isam Information High School become hooked to playing milk caps (ttakji) using chicken coupons. Ah-ram gets the hang of it and begins to take the lead. Tasting glory, she challenges Kyung-woo, who has defeated many of his peers, to a match.
23	"Double Date's Temperature Difference"; Transliteration: "Deobeuldeiteu ondocha" (Korean: 더블데이트 온도차)	Seo Joo-wan	Kwak Kyung-yoon	December 6, 2020
Joo-young ponders about having little "skinship" with Ja-rim compared to other couples. Kyung-woo's relationship with Ye-seul is put to the test when they go to a double date with Joo-young and Ja-rim at Lotte World.
24	"The Lunch From Your Nightmares"; Transliteration: "Jiogeseo on dosirak" (Korean: 지옥에서 온 도시락)	Seo Joo-wan	Kwak Kyung-yoon	December 10, 2020
The cafeteria is under emergency repairs, so Ja-rim decides to pack lunch for her and Joo-young despite being a lamentable cook. Min-ji goes out with her admirer Sang-hoon, but she learns later on that her crush Kyung-woo has broken up with Ye-seul.
25	"If You Study, Your Future Spouse Will Change"; Transliteration: "Gongbureul hamyeon miraeui bae-ujaga bakkwinda" (Korean: 공부를 하면 미래의 배우자가 바뀐다)	Seo Joo-wan	Kwak Kyung-yoon	December 13, 2020
Fearing his mother's wrath, Byung-hoon decides to skip playing games and study for the exams, but his attention is diverted when she meets and gets attracted to a pretty college girl at the library. Ji-soo confesses his feelings to Ah-ram.
26	"Room Party, Truth Game"; Transliteration: "Bangppati jinsilgeim" (Korean: 방빠티 진실게임)	Seo Joo-wan	Kwak Kyung-yoon	December 17, 2020
Joo-young's grades dropped, prompting his mother to tell him to move out from his apartment and live with his parents once again. His friends decide to hold a send off party for Joo-young.
27	"A Ghost Story in Isam Information High School"; Transliteration: "Isamjeongbogo goedam" (Korean: 이삼정보고 괴담)	Seo Joo-wan	Kwak Kyung-yoon	December 20, 2020
All Grade 11 students are mandated to retake an exam and Classes 1-2 and 1-3, the last to take the exam, have to stay until nightfall. After the exam, Jin-hee suggests playing an item retrieval game among the friends to test their courage, much to scaredy-cat Kyung-woo's worry.
28	"Guilty Conscience"; Transliteration: "Jagyeokjisim" (Korean: 자격지심)	Seo Joo-wan	Kwak Kyung-yoon	December 24, 2020
Joo-young starts receiving text messages from his ex-girlfriend Bo-kyung, unknowing of her ulterior motives. As he gets worried that Ja-rim will know about it and misunderstand him, Joo-young runs into Bo-kyung while he is with Ja-rim. Soon, he notices that Ja-rim is not getting angry with him and has started to treat him nicely.
29	"Me to You, You to Me"; Transliteration: "Neo-ege na, na-ege neo" (Korean: 너에게 나, 나에게 너)	Seo Joo-wan	Kwak Kyung-yoon	December 27, 2020
Kyung-woo reveals to Ja-rim the truth about Bo-kyung. Ja-rim decides to deal with the situation herself and confronts Bo-kyung, much to Joo-young's shock.
30	"Our Drama"; Transliteration: "Uri-ui drama" (Korean: 우리의 DRAMA)	Seo Joo-wan	Kwak Kyung-yoon	December 27, 2020
Joo-young prepares a secret special event for Ja-rim but things seemingly do not go as he planned.

== Original soundtrack ==
Love Revolution OST

Soundtrack album by Various artists
- Genre: Soundtrack
- Language: Korean
- Label: Kakao M

=== Part 1 ===
Released on October 22, 2020
No.	Title	Lyrics	Music	Artist	Length
1.	"Not A Sad Song" (이별 노래가 아니야)	Hwang Hyun; Wyatt	Hwang Hyun	ONF	3:58
2.	"Not A Sad Song" (Inst.)		Hwang Hyun		3:58
Total length:					7:56

=== Part 2 ===
Released on November 19, 2020
No.	Title	Lyrics	Music	Artist	Length
1.	"Midnight"	real-fantasy; YOSKE; Bull$EyE; M.O; Paper Maker	real-fantasy; YOSKE; Bull$EyE; M.O; Paper Maker	Park Ji-hoon	3:19
2.	"Midnight" (Inst.)		real-fantasy; YOSKE; Bull$EyE; M.O; Paper Maker		3:19
Total length:					6:38

=== Part 3 ===
Released on December 3, 2020
No.	Title	Lyrics	Music	Artist	Length
1.	"Pit A Pat"	I'm	I'm	I'm	2:57
2.	"Pit A Pat" (Inst.)		I'm		2:57
Total length:					5:54

=== Part 4 ===
Released on December 10, 2020
No.	Title	Lyrics	Music	Artist	Length
1.	"Still Unchanged" (아직도 그대로인 건)	Red Socks	Red Socks	FIL	3:38
2.	"Still Unchanged" (Inst.)		Red Socks		3:38
Total length:					7:16

=== Part 5 ===
Released on December 24, 2020
No.	Title	Lyrics	Music	Artist	Length
1.	"Maybe I Love You" (사랑하나봐요)	Nozy; 이상열; TMC	Nozy; 이상열; TMC	Yeong Eun	4:04
2.	"Maybe I Love You" (Inst.)		Nozy; 이상열; TMC		4:04
Total length:					8:08

== International broadcast ==
The series is available on iQIYI with multi-languages subtitles in South East Asia and Taiwan.
