= Kim Ki-hae =

South Korean actor (born 1999)

- Born: September 28, 1999 (age 26); South Korea
- Occupation: Actor
- Years active: 2020–present
- Agent: BlueWhale
- Height: 185 cm (6 ft 1 in)

Korean name
- Hangul: 김기해
- RR: Gim Gihae
- MR: Kim Kihae
- Website: bluewhaleent.kr?page_id=834

Kim Ki-hae (Korean: 김기해; born September 28, 1999) is a South Korean actor. He made his debut in 2020, and best known for his role in Duty After School (2023).

== Career ==
Kim made his acting debut in the Cheeze Film's web series The Female Friend Among Guys in 2020, which was released on April 17. On the same year on September 9, he appeared in another web series Dalgona as the class president Ha Jin-hyuk. In 2022, Kim made his big screen debut after he was confirmed to appear for director Park Hoon-jung's science fiction action horror film The Witch: Part 2. The Other One, which was released on June 15. On June 14, Sports Seoul reported that he was cast along with actors Shin Ye-eun, Kang Hoon, and Ryeoun for SBS drama The Secret Romantic Guesthouse. On August 23, Kim landed his first lead role as the dark hero Oh Byung-hoon in the 2022 KBS Drama Special episode 2: "Currently Offline", which aired on November 22. In 2023, Kim was confirmed to play the role of Kim Chi-yeol, an ordinary student, in TVING original Duty After School, which premiered on March 21. He then nominated for Best New Actor at the 2nd Blue Dragon Series Awards in July and at the 2023 APAN Star Awards in December, respectively. In 2024, Kim was announced as part of the ensemble cast of Disney+ original series Light Shop, which was released on December 4. In 2025, Kim appeared in the semi-autobiographical drama film Big Deal and was released on May 30.

== Personal life ==
=== Military enlistment ===
In 2024, SPOTV News reported that Kim would enlist in the Navy at the Naval Basic Military Training Corps on October 28, and would undergo a five-week training course as part of his mandatory military service.

== Filmography ==
=== Film ===
Key
†	Denotes films that have not yet been released

Film appearances
Year	Title	Role	Notes	Ref.
2022	The Witch: Part 2. The Other One	Tou pretty boy		
2025	Big Deal	Baek Seong-bin		

=== Television series ===
Key
†	Denotes television productions that have not yet been released

Television series appearances
Year	Title	Role	Notes	Ref.
2022	KBS Drama Special	Oh Byung-hoon	Season 13; Episode: "Currently Offline"	
2023	Duty After School	Kim Chi-yeol		
2024	Light Shop	Ji-woong		

=== Web series ===
Web series appearances
Year	Title	Role	Notes	Ref.
2020	The Female Friend Among Guys	Ki-hae		
2020	Dalgona	Ha Jin-hyuk		

== Awards and nominations ==
Name of the award ceremony, year presented, category, nominee of the award, and the result of the nomination
Award ceremony	Year	Category	Nominee / Work	Result	Ref.
APAN Star Awards	2023	Best New Actor	Duty After School	Nominated	
Blue Dragon Series Awards	2023	Best New Actor	Duty After School	Nominated	
