= Moon Sang-min =

South Korean actor and model (born 2000)

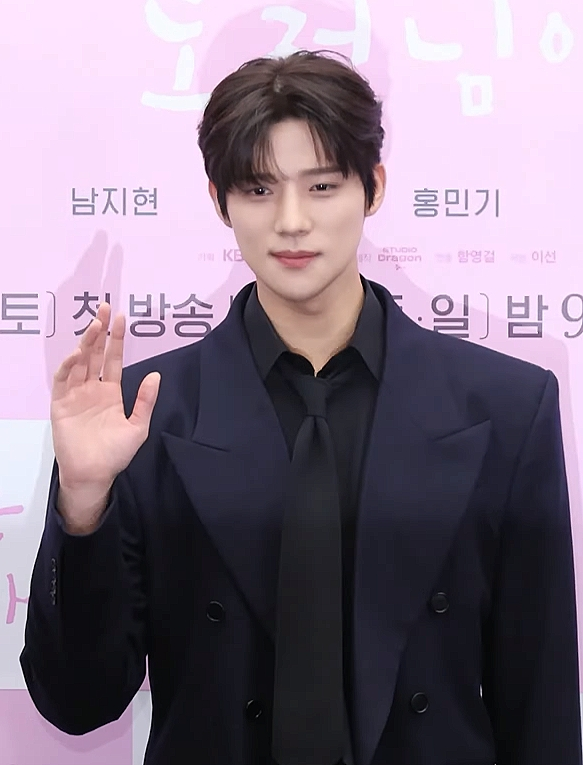
- Moon in December 2025
- Born: April 14, 2000 (age 26); Cheongju, North Chungcheong Province, South Korea
- Education: Hanlim Multi Art School – Fashion Model Department; Sungkyunkwan University
- Occupations: Actor; model
- Years active: 2019–present
- Agent: Awesome ENT

Korean name
- Hangul: 문상민
- Hanja: 文相民
- RR: Mun Sangmin
- MR: Mun Sangmin

Moon Sang-min (Korean: 문상민; born April 14, 2000), is a South Korean actor and model. He is best known for his roles in Under the Queen's Umbrella (2022), Wedding Impossible (2024) and To My Beloved Thief (2026). Moon was awarded Best New Actor for his role in Under the Queen's Umbrella at the 59th Baeksang Arts Awards in 2023.

== Early life ==
Moon Sang-min was born on April 14, 2000, in Cheongju, North Chungcheong Province. His family consists of his parents and an older brother. He graduated from the Fashion Model Department at Hanlim Multi Art School, and is currently attending Sungkyunkwan University.

== Career ==
As a model, he walked his first runway at the 2018 F/W Sewing Boundaries Collection in 2018. In 2019, he made his acting debut in the web drama 4 Reasons Why I Hate Christmas.

In 2021, Moon played the role of a young detective in Netflix series My Name. Then in 2022, he starred in the tvN historical drama Under the Queen's Umbrella. His performance as Grand Prince Seongnam led to an increased popularity and recognition for him, and reportedly more than 20 advertising deals were offered to him by various companies. In 2026, Moon starred in the historical series To My Beloved Thief as a grand prince in Joseon.

== Other activities ==
=== Endorsements ===
On January 2, 2023, Moon was selected as a model for the domestic watch brand Romanson. On February 1, Moon introduced as the new brand ambassador of the beauty care brand I'm from.

On September 2, 2024, it was announced that Lullua had selected Moon as the ambassador for its beauty brand.

== Filmography ==
=== Film ===
Year	Title	Role	Ref.
2026	Pavane	Gyeong-rok	

=== Television series ===
Year	Title	Role	Notes	Ref.
2021	My Name	Ko Gun-pyung		
2022	Under the Queen's Umbrella	Grand Prince Seongnam / Yi Kang		
2023	Duty After School	Wang Tae-man		
2024	Wedding Impossible	Lee Ji-han		
2024	Cinderella at 2 AM	Seo Joo-won		
2024	Love Your Enemy	young Seok Ban-hee	Special appearance	
2026	To My Beloved Thief	Prince Dowol / Yi Yeol		
TBA	No Crushing Allowed	Lee Chi-won		

=== Web series ===
Year	Title	Role	Ref.
2019	4 Reasons Why I Hate Christmas	Yeom Se-jin	
2020	The Colors of Our Time	Jungwoo	
2020	The Mermaid Prince: The Beginning	Jo Ah-seo	

=== Music video appearances ===
Year	Title	Artist	Ref.
2026	"Robot"	Lee Young-ji	

=== Hosting ===
Year	Title	Notes	Ref.
2024–2026	Music Bank	with Hong Eun-chae and Minju	
2024	2024 KBS Drama Awards	with Jang Sung-kyu and Seohyun	
2025	2025 KBS Drama Awards	with Jang Sung-kyu and Nam Ji-hyun	

== Accolades ==
=== Awards and nominations ===
Name of the award ceremony, year presented, category, nominee of the award, and the result of the nomination
Award ceremony	Year	Category	Nominee / Work	Result	Ref.
APAN Star Awards	2023	Best New Actor	Under the Queen's Umbrella	Won	
Asia Artist Awards	2023	Rookie of the Year	Moon Sang-min	Won	
Baeksang Arts Awards	2023	Best New Actor – Television	Under the Queen's Umbrella	Won	
Baeksang Arts Awards	2026	Best New Actor – Film	Pavane	Nominated	
Blue Dragon Film Awards	2026	Best New Actor	Pavane	Pending	
Blue Dragon Series Awards	2023	Best New Actor	Duty After School	Nominated	
Buil Film Awards	2026	Best New Actor	Pavane	Nominated	
Golden Cinematography Awards	2026	Best New Actor	Pavane	Won	
KBS Entertainment Awards	2024	Best Couple Award	Moon Sang-min (with Minju); Music Bank	Won	
Korea First Brand Awards	2023	Best New Actor	Under the Queen's Umbrella	Won	

=== Listicles ===
Publisher	Year	Listicle	Placement	Ref.
Elle Japan	2022	Hallyu Best Actor Top 16 – Rising Star	1st	
