= Pale Moon (TV series) =

2023 South Korean television series

- Promotional poster
- Hangul: 종이달
- Lit.: Paper Moon
- RR: Jongidal
- MR: Chongidal
- Genre: Suspense thriller; Crime
- Created by: Park Min-seol
- Based on: Kami no Tsuki by Mitsuyo Kakuta
- Written by: Noh Yoon-su
- Directed by: Yoo Jong-seon; Jung Won-hee
- Starring: Kim Seo-hyung; Yoo Sun; Seo Young-hee; Lee Si-woo; Gong Jung-hwan; Lee Chun-hee; Yoon Hee-seok
- Music by: Kim Nam-yoon; Heo Jun-hyeok
- Country of origin: South Korea
- Original language: Korean
- No. of episodes: 10

Production
- Executive producers: Park Min-seol; Lee Hyung-hoon (CP); Hong Geun-hae (CP)
- Producers: Han Ah-reum; Ryu Jung-min
- Editor: Lee Dong-hyun
- Running time: 70 minutes
- Production companies: Lotte Cultureworks; Big Ocean ENM

Original release
- Network: ENA
- Release: April 10 – May 9, 2023

Related
- Pale Moon (film)

Pale Moon (Korean: 종이달) is a 2023 South Korean television series starring Kim Seo-hyung, Yoo Sun, Seo Young-hee, Lee Si-woo, Gong Jung-hwan, Lee Chun-hee, and Yoon Hee-seok. It is based on a novel of the same name by Mitsuyo Kakuta, which was previously made into a movie and TV series in Japan. The series is an original drama of Genie TV, and is available for streaming on its platform, and on TVING. It also aired on ENA from April 10 to May 9, 2023, every Monday and Tuesday at 22:00 (KST).

The first episode of Pale Moon was screened at the Rendez-vous (non-competition section) of the 2023 Cannes International Series Festival on April 19, 2023.

== Synopsis ==
The series follows the story of Yoo I-hwa (Kim Seo-hyung), a bored housewife with an indifferent and ambitious husband, who lives a comfortable but somewhat empty life. She then gets a job as a contract employee at a savings bank and gradually regains her confidence. However, her normal daily life becomes irreversibly twisted when she begins to embezzle the VIP customers' money.

== Cast ==
=== Main ===
- Kim Seo-hyung as Yoo I-hwa: a woman in search of true happiness
- Yoo Sun as Ryu Ga-eul: I-hwa's friend who is the general manager of a beauty company
- Seo Young-hee as Kang Seon-young: I-hwa's friend who is a full-time housewife
- Lee Si-woo as Yoon Min-jae: a film major student
- Gong Jung-hwan as Choi Gi-hyeon: I-hwa's husband
- Lee Chun-hee as Seong Si-hun: Ga-eul's ex-husband who is a dermatologist
- Yoon Hee-seok as Je-guk: Seon-young's husband and Gi-hyeon's colleague

=== Supporting ===
- Yoo Ui-tae as Geum Seok-jin: Ga-eul's colleague
- Byun Seo-yoon as Lim Ga-deun: Min-jae's close college classmate
- Kim Jae-in as Jin Young-seo: an employee at a savings bank
- Yoo Chae-hee as Seong Tae-mi: Ga-eul and Si-hun's daughter
- Yoon Bo-ra as Lee Ru-ri: I-hwa's colleague who is a bank teller
- Yoon A-jung as So Mi-kyung: the head of a cosmetics brand
- Lee Ga-ryeong as Goo Se-ju: a famous social media influencer and YouTuber
- Lee Chae-eun as Na Min-su
- Nam Woo-joo as Ru-ri's boyfriend
- Lee Ga-eun as Yoon-so: a top star actress
- Jang Hang-seon as Park Byung-sik
- Byun Jung-hee as Oh Sook-ja

=== Special appearance ===
- Kim Young-hoon as Tae-min: I-hwa's VIP customer

== Viewership ==
Pale Moon : South Korea viewers per episode (thousands)

Season	Episode number									
Season	1	2	3	4	5	6	7	8	9	10
1	N/A	N/A	205	N/A	N/A	N/A	N/A	233	272	338

Source: Audience measurement performed nationwide by Nielsen Korea.

Average TV viewership ratings
Ep.	Original broadcast date	Average audience share (Nielsen Korea)	
Ep.	Original broadcast date	Nationwide	Seoul
1	April 10, 2023	0.975% (10th)	1.057% (9th)
2	April 11, 2023	0.9% (17th)	1.263% (5th)
3	April 17, 2023	1.056% (6th)	1.187% (5th)
4	April 18, 2023	1.0% (14th)	1.150% (4th)
5	April 24, 2023	0.9% (14th)	N/A
6	April 25, 2023	0.9% (18th)	N/A
7	May 1, 2023	1.242% (6th)	1.657% (5th)
8	May 2, 2023	1.306% (5th)	1.386% (6th)
9	May 8, 2023	1.405% (5th)	1.695% (4th)
10	May 9, 2023	1.504% (4th)	1.617% (5th)
Average		1.119%	1.377% (Note: This average rating is calculated based on the published ratings. The exact average rating is unknown due to multiple unpublished ratings.)
In the table above, the blue numbers represent the lowest ratings and the red numbers represent the highest ratings.; N/A denotes ratings that were not published.; This series aired on a cable channel/pay TV which normally has a relatively smaller audience compared to free-to-air TV/public broadcasters (KBS, SBS, MBC and EBS).
