= Gyo-dong, Gongju =

Neighborhood in Gongju

- Hangul: 교동
- Hanja: 校洞
- RR: Gyo-dong
- MR: Kyo-dong

Gyo-dong (Korean: 교동) is a dong or neighborhood in the city of Gongju, South Chungcheong province, South Korea. It is one of legal dong under its administrative dong Ungjin-dong's jurisdiction.

Gyeong-dong is served by Gongju Fire Station, Gongju Girls' Middle School, and Gyo-dong Elementary School. Gongju Hyanggyo in the district is designated as a tangible cultural property of South Chungcheong province.
