= Siren: Survive the Island =

South Korean reality television series

- Promotional poster
- Hangul: 사이렌: 불의 섬
- Lit.: Siren: Isle of Fire
- RR: Sairen: burui seom
- MR: Sairen: purŭi sŏm
- Genre: Reality competition
- Directed by: Lee Eun-kyung; Lee So-min; Hwang Yun-seo
- Country of origin: South Korea
- Original language: Korean
- No. of episodes: 10

Production
- Producer: Go Min-gu
- Production company: Studio Modak

Original release
- Network: Netflix
- Release: May 30 – June 6, 2023

Siren: Survive the Island (Korean: 사이렌: 불의 섬) is a South Korean reality competition series on Netflix. The series places 24 women, divided into six teams of four by their occupation (police officers, firefighters, bodyguards, soldiers, athletes and stuntwomen), on a remote island. The teams compete in various challenges over the course of seven days until only one remains.

The season consisted of ten episodes. The first five episodes were released on May 30, 2023, while the last five episodes were released on June 6, 2023. Team Athlete won.

Unlike most reality TV programs, contestants were paid for participating and winners did not receive prize money. Director Lee Eun Kyung told interviewers that her goal with the series was to highlight honor in public service: "The participants are public servants who have staked their professional honor on this competition. From the start, they didn't come to fight for money but for the honor." Each participant was paid equally, regardless of elimination.

Siren: Survive the Island has a 100% average Tomatometer and 96% average Popcornometer on Rotten Tomatoes. Netflix declined to renew the show for a second season.

== Contestants ==
List of Season 1 Contestants
Contestant	Team	Notes
**Kim Hyeon-ah**	Firefighter	
Jung Min-seon	Firefighter Square house defense base	
Lim Hyeon-ji	Firefighter	
Kim Ji-hye	Firefighter	Bodybuilder
**Kim Hye-ri**	Police Boathouse defense base	
Kim Hae-young	Police	Former wrestler
Lee Seul	Police	
Seo Jeong-ha	Police	
**Lee Su-ryeon**	Guard Shelter defense base	First female bodyguard to work in the Presidential Security Service, bodyguard for former President Roh Moo-hyun, former President Lee Myung-bak, and former President Park Geun-hye. Actress and model
Hwang Su-hyun	Guard	
Lee Eun-jin	Guard	
Lee Ji-hyun	Guard	
**Kim Bom-eun**	Soldier Cabin defense base	Served w/Korean Army Special Forces (707th Special Mission Group) in the airborne unit, specialising in firearms and gathering of intel
Kang Eun-mi	Soldier	Korean Army Special Forces (707th Special Mission Group) reservist. Contestant on Physical: 100
Lee Hyun-seon	Soldier	Served with Korean Army Special Forces (707th Special Mission Group) in counter-terrorism
Kim Na-eun	Soldier	Served with the Korean Army Special Forces (707th Special Mission Group)
**Kim Hee-jeong**	Athlete Cliff Tent defense base	National kabaddi player
Kim Seong-yeon	Athlete	Former national judoka. Former Olympian and winner of numerous accolades in international judo competitions representing South Korea
Kim Min-sun	Athlete	Sports climber
Kim Eun-byul	Athlete	Ssireum wrestler
**Kim Kyung-ae**	Stunt Treehouse defense base	
Lee Seo-young	Stunt	
Jo Hye-kyung	Stunt	
Ha Seul-Gi	Stunt	

Bold denotes the leader of the team.

== Episode list ==
No.	Title
1	"What I Do Is Not Easy"
2	"Tenacity Is My Middle Name"
3	"None of That Matters As Long As We Win"
4	"No Fun in an Easy Win"
5	"Let's Have Faith in Our Strength"
6	"Who Could Possibly Beat Us?"
7	"It Was Worth the Wait"
8	"Let the Results Speak for Itself"
9	"The Seasoned Warriors"
10	"A Fearless Charge"

== Results ==
=== Base Ownership ===
Base	Battle 1	Battle 2	Battle 3	Battle 4	Battle 5
Boathouse	Police	Soldier	Soldier	Firefighter	Firefighter
Cabin	Soldier	Soldier	Soldier	Firefighter	Firefighter
Shelter	Guard	Guard	Guard	Guard	Athlete
Square House	Firefighter	Firefighter	Firefighter	Firefighter	Firefighter
Tent	Athlete	Athlete	Athlete	Athlete	Athlete
Tree House	Stunt	Stunt	Athlete	Athlete	Athlete
Redemption				Soldier	Athlete

- Italics indicates the owner was eliminated in this battle.
