= Gyo-dong, Daegu =

Neighborhood in Daegu, South Korea

- Hangul: 교동
- Hanja: 校洞
- RR: Gyo-dong
- MR: Kyo-dong

Gyo-dong (Korean: 교동) is a dong or neighborhood in the metropolitan city of Daegu, South Korea. It is one of legal dong under its administrative dong Seongnae 1-dong's jurisdiction. The name, Gyo-dong originates from the fact that the area has had a hyanggyo, government-managed Confucian academies during the Joseon period. It belonged to Dongsang-myeon, Daegu-bu during the Joseon Dynasty

Gyeong-dong Market is located in the center of the city beside Dong-a Department store. On an alley on the opposite site of the market is clustered with movie theatres, such as Daegu Theatre, Jayu Theatre and Songju Theatre.

== See also ==
- Gyo-dong, Gyeongju
