= Tastefully Yours =

2025 South Korean television series

- Promotional poster
- Hangul: 당신의 맛
- Lit.: Your Taste
- RR: Dangsinui mat
- MR: Tangsinŭi mat
- Genre: Romantic comedy
- Created by: Han Jun-hee
- Written by: Jung Soo-yoon
- Directed by: Park Dan-hee
- Starring: Kang Ha-neul; Go Min-si; Kim Shin-rok; Yoo Su-bin
- Music by: Park Sung-joon
- Country of origin: South Korea
- Original language: Korean
- No. of episodes: 10

Production
- Running time: 60 minutes
- Production company: Shortcake

Original release
- Network: ENA; Genie TV
- Release: May 12 – June 10, 2025

Tastefully Yours (Korean: 당신의 맛) is a 2025 South Korean television series created by Han Jun-hee, written by Jung Soo-yoon, directed by Park Dan-hee, and starring Kang Ha-neul, Go Min-si, Kim Shin-rok and Yoo Su-bin. It aired on ENA from May 12, to June 10, 2025, every Monday and Tuesday at 22:00 (KST). It is available for streaming on Genie TV in South Korea and on Netflix in selected regions.

== Synopsis ==
This is a story about Han Beom-woo, an executive director at Korea's top food conglomerate, Hansang, who runs the best fine dining restaurant in Seoul, and Mo Yeon-joo, a chef crazy about taste who runs a one-table restaurant without a sign in a remote corner of the countryside. They grow together and fall in love while running a small restaurant in Jeonju.

== Cast and characters ==
=== Main ===
- Kang Ha-neul as Han Beom-woo

An executive director at Korea's top food conglomerate Hansang and the head of Motto, a one-star restaurant.

- Go Min-si as Mo Yeon-joo

A stubborn and crazy chef who runs a one-table restaurant without a sign in Jeonju.

- Kim Shin-rok as Jin Myeong-sook

The ace employee of the most popular gukbap restaurant in the area.

- Yoo Su-bin as Shin Chun-seung

The son of the owner of the gukbap restaurant.

=== Supporting ===
- Bae Na-ra as Han Seon-woo

The eldest son of Hansang and the head of La Lecel, a two-star fine dining restaurant.

- Hong Hwa-yeon as Jang Young-hye

Head chef of the fine dining restaurant Motto.

- Bae Yoo-ram as Lee Yu-jin

An employee at Motto and Han Beom-woo's secretary.

- Oh Min-ae as Han Yeo-ul

The founder and chef who built Hansang.

- Lee Joong-ok as Butcher store owner

The owner of a butcher shop in Jeonju.

- Yoon Byung-hee as Vegetable store owner

The owner of a vegetable shop in Jeonju.

=== Special appearances ===
- Yoo Yeon-seok as Jeon Min

Yeon-joo's ex-boyfriend who is also a chef.

- Park Ji-hoon as Eun-jae

An actor that Myeong-sook enjoys to watch.

== Production ==
=== Development ===
Director Han Jun-hee, who participated in D.P. series (2021) as screenwriter and Weak Hero Class 1 (2022) as creative director, is participating as the general creator. Writer Jung Soo-yoon, who penned Boy Flying and Playlist Ending series, and director Park Dan-hee, who helmed Blue Birthday and co-directed of Weak Hero Class 1, have joined forces to work on the series. It is planned by KT Studio and produced by Shortcake.

=== Casting ===
On October 17, 2024, it was reported that Kang Ha-neul, Go Min-si, Kim Shin-rok, and Yoo Su-bin has confirmed their appearances in the series.

On December 13, 2024, Yoo Yeon-seok confirmed his special appearance in the series.

== Release ==
Tastefully Yours premiered on ENA and Genie TV on May 12, 2025, and aired every Monday and Tuesday at 22:00 (KST). The series is available for streaming on Netflix in selected regions.

== Viewership ==
Tastefully Yours : South Korea viewers per episode (thousands)

Season	Episode number										Average
Season	1	2	3	4	5	6	7	8	9	10	Average
1	372	521	622	741	795	780	761	721	628	882	682

Source: Audience measurement performed nationwide by Nielsen Korea.

Average TV viewership ratings
Ep.	Original broadcast date	Average audience share	
Ep.	Original broadcast date	(Nielsen Korea)	
Ep.	Original broadcast date	Nationwide	Seoul
1	May 12, 2025	1.591% (2nd)	1.622% (3rd)
2	May 13, 2025	2.010% (4th)	2.150% (4th)
3	May 19, 2025	2.469% (2nd)	2.588% (2nd)
4	May 20, 2025	3.102% (2nd)	2.907% (2nd)
5	May 26, 2025	3.404% (1st)	3.203% (2nd)
6	May 27, 2025	3.271% (1st)	3.079% (2nd)
7	June 2, 2025	2.974% (2nd)	2.653% (2nd)
8	June 3, 2025	2.969% (1st)	2.703% (1st)
9	June 9, 2025	2.849% (2nd)	2.679% (2nd)
10	June 10, 2025	3.801% (1st)	3.277% (1st)
Average		2.844%	2.686%
In the table above, the blue numbers represent the lowest ratings and the red numbers represent the highest ratings.

== Accolades ==
Award ceremony	Year	Category	Nominee / Work	Result	Ref.
Korea Drama Awards	2025	Best Drama	Tastefully Yours	Nominated	
Korea Drama Awards	2025	Top Excellence Award, Actor	Kang Ha-neul	Nominated	
Korea Drama Awards	2025	Best New Actor	Bae Na-ra	Nominated	
Korea Drama Awards	2025	Best New Actress	Hong Hwa-yeon	Won	
