= List of awards and nominations received by Kim Hye-soo =

Kim Hye-soo awards and nominations
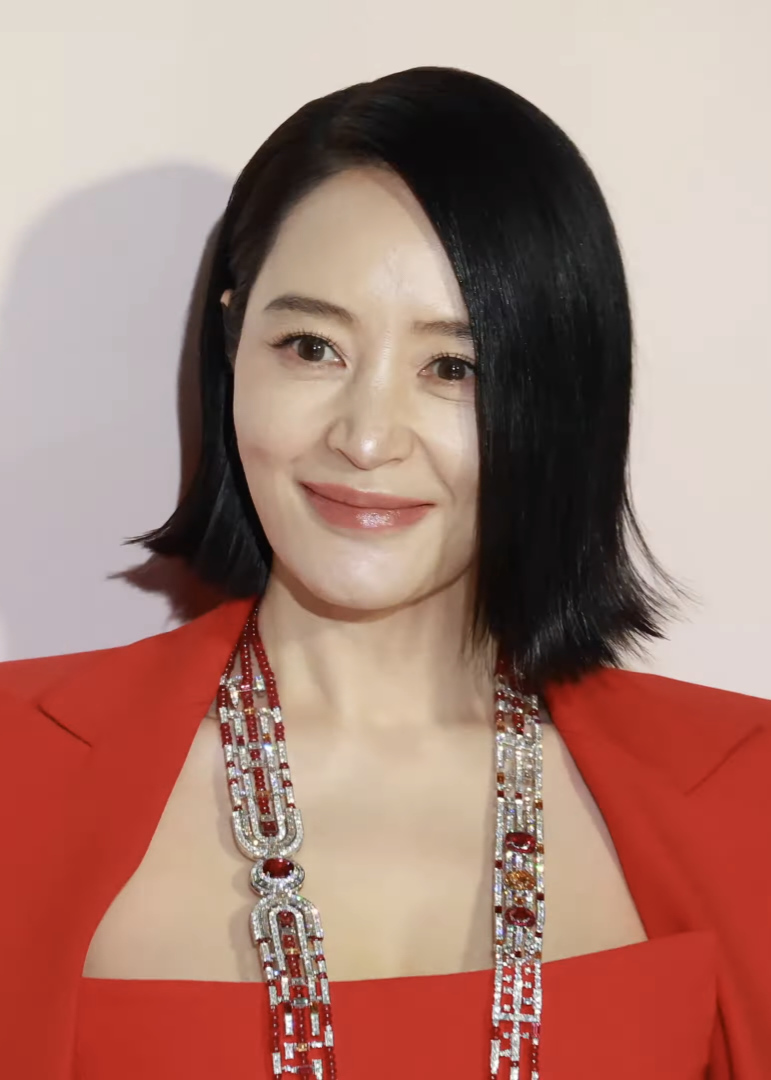
- Kim in 2025
Awards and nominations
Award	Wins	Nominations
Blue Dragon Film Awards	5	14
Baeksang Arts Awards	7	20
Grand Bell Awards	1	8
Buil Film Awards	0	2
Korea Gold Awards Festival	1	1
Korean Association of Film Critics Awards	1	1
Chunsa Film Art Awards	4	4
KBS Drama Awards	4	8
MBC Drama Awards	6	9
SBS Drama Awards	1	5
tvN10 Awards	1	1

Totals (Note: Certain award groups do not simply award one winner. They acknowledge several different recipients, have runners-up, and have third place. Since this is a specific recognition and is different from losing an award, runner-up mentions are considered wins in this award tally. For simplification and to avoid errors, each award in this list has been presumed to have had a prior nomination.)
- Wins: 54
- Nominations: 110

South Korean actress Kim Hye-soo has been recognized with multiple awards and nominations in film and television. She has won seven Baeksang Arts Awards, five Blue Dragon Film Awards, one Grand Bell Awards— seven for Best Actress, and two for Best New Actress—since the first award in 1987 for her debut performance in Ggambo. Kim holds the record for the youngest actress to win Blue Dragon Film Award for Best Leading Actress for First Love (1993) at the age of 23. She has also won three times for her work in First Love (1993), Dr. Bong (1995), and Tazza: The High Rollers (2006), making her tie with Yoon Jeong-hee for the most awards for Blue Dragon Film Award for Best Leading Actress.

In 2005, Kim won Best Actress Award at both Baeksang Arts Awards and Grand Bell Awards, achieving the "Grand Slam" acting career for winning Best Actress Awards at three major Korean film awards (Baeksang, Grand Bell, and Blue Dragon).

Kim consecutively won the MBC Drama Awards for Best Actress in 1995 and MBC Drama Awards for Grand Prize in 1996 for The Man of The Woman and Partner. She also won two KBS Drama Awards for Grand Prize in 2003 and 2013. Kim is the first and only actress to win three competitive Grand Prizes with different Drama Awards held by major Korean television networks. In addition, she won two Baeksang Arts Award for Best Actress for Oxtail Soup (1996) and Signal (2016).

== Major awards ==
=== Asian Film Awards ===
Year	Category	Work	Result	Ref.
2007	Best Actress	Tazza: The High Rollers	Nominated	
2008	Best Supporting Actress	Skeletons in the Closet	Nominated	
2013	Best Supporting Actress	The Thieves	Nominated	
2016	Best Actress	Coin Locker Girl	Nominated	

=== Baeksang Arts Awards ===
Baeksang Arts Film Awards

Year	Category	Work	Result	Ref.
1987	Best New Actress – Film	Ggambo	Won	
1993	Best Actress – Film	First Love	Nominated	
1995	Most Popular Actress – Film	The Eternal Empire	Won	
1996	Best Actress – Film	Dr. Bong	Nominated	
2005	Best Actress – Film	Hypnotized	Won	
2007	Best Actress – Film	Tazza: The High Rollers	Nominated	
2016	Best Actress – Film	Coin Locker Girl	Nominated	
2017	Best Actress – Film	Familyhood	Nominated	
2019	Best Actress – Film	Default	Nominated	
2019	Bazaar Icon Award	Default	Won	
2021	Best Actress – Film	The Day I Died: Unclosed Case	Nominated	

Baeksang Arts TV Awards

Year	Category	Work	Result	Ref.
1988	Best New Actress – Television	Samogok	Nominated	
1991	Most Popular Actress – Television	When The Flower Blooms And The Bird sings	Won	
1996	Best Actress – Television	Oxtail Soup	Won	
2000	Best Actress – Television	Kook Hee	Nominated	
2014	Best Actress – Television	The Queen of Office	Nominated	
2016	Best Actress – Television	Signal	Won	
2020	Best Actress – Television	Hyena	Nominated	
2022	Best Actress – Television	Juvenile Justice	Nominated	
2023	Best Actress – Television	Under the Queen's Umbrella	Nominated	

=== Blue Dragon Film Awards ===
Year	Category	Work	Result	Ref.
1993	Best Leading Actress	First Love	Won	
1995	Best Leading Actress	Dr. Bong	Won	
2004	Best Leading Actress	Hypnotized	Nominated	
2006	Best Leading Actress	Tazza: The High Rollers	Won	
2006	Popular Star Award	Tazza: The High Rollers	Won	
2011	Best Leading Actress	Villain and Widow	Nominated	
2011	Popular Star Award	Villain and Widow	Won	
2013	Best Supporting Actress	The Face Reader	Nominated	
2015	Best Leading Actress	Coin Locker Girl	Nominated	
2016	Best Leading Actress	Familyhood	Nominated	
2019	Best Leading Actress	Default	Nominated	
2021	Best Leading Actress	The Day I Died: Unclosed Case	Nominated	
2023	Best Leading Actress	Smugglers	Nominated	
2023	Blue Dragon Film Award - Special Achievement Award	Kim Hye-soo	Won	

=== Blue Dragon Series Awards ===
Year	Category	Work	Result	Ref.
2022	Best Leading Actress	Juvenile Justice	Nominated	

=== Grand Bell Awards ===
Year	Category	Work	Result	Ref.
1993	Best Actress	First Love	Nominated	
1996	Best Actress	Dr. Bong	Nominated	
2005	Best Actress	Hypnotized	Won	
2006	Best Actress	The Red Shoes	Nominated	
2007	Best Actress	Tazza: The High Rollers	Nominated	
2011	Best Actress	Villain and Widow	Nominated	
2015	Best Actress	Coin Locker Girl	Nominated	

== Critics awards ==
=== Asian Film Critics Association Awards ===
Year	Category	Work	Result	Ref.
2007	Best Actress	Tazza: The High Rollers	Nominated	

=== Buil Film Awards ===
The Buil Film Awards are presented in an annual award show hosted by the Busan Ilbo newspaper since 1958.

Year	Category	Work	Result	Ref.
2015	Best Actress	Coin Locker Girl	Nominated	
2016	Best Actress	Familyhood	Nominated	

=== Chunsa Film Art Awards ===
The Chunsa Film Art Awards are annually presented by the Korean Film Directors' Association (DGK) since 1990.

Year	Category	Work	Result	Ref.
2004	Best Actress	Hypnotized	Won	
2006	Best Actress	Tazza: The High Rollers	Won	
2016	Best Actress	Coin Locker Girl	Won	
2023	Best Actress	Smugglers	Won	

=== Cine21 Film Awards ===
Year	Category	Work	Result	Ref.
2007	Best Actress	Tazza: The High Rollers	Won	

=== Director's Cut Awards ===
Year	Category	Work	Result	Ref.
2019	Jury Award	Default	Nominated	

=== Grimae Awards ===
The Grimae Awards are an annual award ceremony held by the Korean Television Producers Association (KDPS) since 1993.

Year	Category	Work	Result	Ref.
1999	Best Actress	Kuk-hee	Won	

=== KOFRA Film Awards ===
Year	Category	Work	Result	Ref.
2019	Jury Award	Default	Won	

=== Korea Gold Awards Festival ===
The Korea Gold Awards Festival is an annual award show presented by the Korean Society of Cinematographers (KSC) in recognition of the technical achievements in Korean films since 1977. It added acting awards categories in 1993.

Year	Category	Work	Result	Ref.
2015	Best Actress	Coin Locker Girl	Won	

=== Korean Association of Film Critics Awards ===
The Korean Association of Film Critics Awards are presented annually since 1980 by the Korean Association of Film Critics (KAFC) recognizing excellence in films, both domestic and foreign.

Year	Category	Work	Result	Ref.
2015	Best Actress	Coin Locker Girl	Won	

=== Korean Film Actor's Association Awards ===
Year	Category	Work	Result	Ref.
2015	Top Star Award	Coin Locker Girl	Won	

=== Korean Film Producers Association Awards ===
Year	Category	Work	Result	Ref.
2015	Best Actress	Coin Locker Girl	Won	

=== Max Movie Awards ===
Year	Category	Work	Result	Ref.
2007	Best Actress	Tazza: The High Rollers	Nominated	
2014	Best Actress	The Face Reader	Nominated	
2014	Best Supporting Actress	The Face Reader	Nominated	
2016	Best Actress	Coin Locker Girl	Nominated	

== Television network awards ==
=== KBS Drama Awards ===
Year	Category	Work	Result	Ref.
1987	Best New Actress	Samogok, Young Zelkova Tree	Won	
1988	Excellence Award, Actress	Sun Shim-yi	Nominated	
2003	Grand Prize (Daesang) (Note: A Daesang (Korean: 대상), which translates to "Grand Prize", is the highest honor given out at South Korean award ceremonies.)	Jang Hui-bin	Won	
2003	Top Excellence Award, Actress	Jang Hui-bin	Nominated	
2013	Grand Prize (Daesang)	The Queen of Office	Won	
2013	Top Excellence Award, Actress	The Queen of Office	Nominated	
2013	Excellence Award, Actress in a Miniseries	The Queen of Office	Nominated	
2013	Best Couple Award with Oh Ji-ho	The Queen of Office	Won	

=== MBC Drama Awards ===
Year	Category	Work	Result	Ref.
1991	Excellence Award, Actress	Rosy Life	Nominated	
1995	Top Excellence Award, Actress	Oxtail Soup	Won	
1996	Grand Prize (Daesang)	Partner	Won	
1996	Top Excellence Award, Actress	Partner	Nominated	
1996	Best Couple Award with Lee Jong-won	Partner	Won	
1999	Grand Prize (Daesang)	Kuk-hee	Nominated	
1999	Top Excellence Award, Actress	Kuk-hee	Won	
1999	Talent of the Year	Kuk-hee	Won	
2004	Top Excellence Award, Actress	Han River Ballad	Won	

=== SBS Drama Awards ===
Year	Category	Work	Result	Ref.
2009	Top Excellence Award, Actress	Style	Nominated	
2009	Top 10 Stars	Style	Won	
2020	Grand Prize (Daesang)	Hyena	Nominated	
2020	Top Excellence Award, Actress in a Miniseries Genre/Action Drama	Hyena	Nominated	
2020	Best Couple Award with Ju Ji-hoon	Hyena	Nominated	

=== tvN10 Awards ===
Year	Category	Work	Result	Ref.
2016	Best Actress	Signal	Won	

== Other awards ==
=== Asian Academy Creative Awards ===
Year	Category	Work	Result	Ref.
2022	Best Actress in a leading role	Juvenile Justice	Nominated	

=== Asia Contents Awards ===
Year	Category	Work	Result	Ref.
2020	Best Actress	Hyena	Nominated	
2020	Excellence Award	Hyena	Won	

=== Asia-Pacific Producers Network Awards ===
Year	Category	Work	Result	Ref.
2015	Asian Movie Artist Award	Coin Locker Girl	Won	

=== APAN Star Awards ===
Year	Category	Work	Result	Ref.
2013	Top Excellence Award, Actress	Tazza: The High Rollers and The Queen of Office	Nominated	
2016	Top Excellence Award, Actress in a Miniseries	Signal	Nominated	
2021	Grand Prize (Daesang)	Hyena	Nominated	
2022	Top Excellence Award, Actress in an OTT Drama	Juvenile Justice	Nominated	
2023	Top Excellence Award, Actress in a Miniseries	Under the Queen's Umbrella	Nominated	

=== KBS Excellent Program Evaluation Awards ===
Year	Category	Work	Result	Ref.
1987	Best Acting	Young Zelkova Tree	Won	

=== Korea Fashion Photographers Association ===
Year	Category	Work	Result	Ref.
2000	Photogenic Actor Award	Kim Hye-soo	Won	

=== Dong-A TV Fashion Beauty Awards ===
Year	Category	Work	Result	Ref.
2005	Fashion Icon Award	Kim Hye-soo	Won	

=== Hong Kong International Film Festival ===
Year	Category	Work	Result	Ref.
2007	Best Actress	Tazza: The High Rollers	Nominated	

=== Korea Best Dresser Swan Awards ===
Year	Category	Work	Result	Ref.
2006	Best Dressed, Movie Actress category	Kim Hye-soo	Won	

=== Korean Film Awards ===
Year	Category	Work	Result	Ref.
2004	Best Actress	Hypnotized	Nominated	
2005	Best Actress	The Red Shoes	Nominated	
2007	Best Actress	Tazza: The High Rollers	Nominated	

=== Korea Drama Awards ===
Year	Category	Work	Result	Ref.
2006	Grand Prize (Daesang)	The Queen of Office	Nominated	
2023	Grand Prize (Daesang)	Under the Queen's Umbrella	Nominated	

=== Korea Movie Star Awards ===
Year	Category	Work	Result	Ref.
2007	Best Actress	Tazza: The High Rollers	Won	

=== Korea Visual Arts Festival ===
Year	Category	Work	Result	Ref.
2007	Photogenic Award	Kim Hye-soo	Won	
2011	Photogenic Award	Kim Hye-soo	Won	

=== Newport Beach Film Festival ===
Year	Category	Work	Result	Ref.
2006	Best Actress	Tazza: The High Rollers	Won	

=== Pyeongtaek Film Festival ===
Year	Category	Work	Result	Ref.
2006	Best Actress	Tazza: The High Rollers	Won	

=== Style Icon Awards ===
Year	Category	Work	Result	Ref.
2009	Best Actress	Style	Won	
2009	Icon of the Year	Kim Hye-soo	Won	

=== University Film Festival of Korea ===
Year	Category	Work	Result	Ref.
2006	Best Actress	Tazza: The High Rollers	Won	

== Miscellaneous awards ==
=== Asia Model Awards ===
Year	Category	Work	Result	Ref.
2025	Asia SNS Star Award	Kim Hye-soo	Won	

=== Korea Culture and Entertainment Awards ===
Korea Culture and Entertainment Awards are an annual award show held by the Korea Entertainment Information Newspaper since 1992.

Year	Category	Work	Result	Ref.
2006	Best Actress	Tazza: The High Rollers	Won	
2012	Top Excellence Award, Actress (Film)	The Thieves	Won	
2013	Grand Prize (Daesang) for TV	The Queen of Office	Won	

=== Kinolights Awards ===
Year	Category	Work	Result	Ref.
2022	Actress of the Year (Domestic)	Juvenile Justice	2nd	

=== Visionary Awards ===
Note: (Note: Visionary Awards, which started in 2020, selects and awards people who lead roles in the Korean entertainment industry. It highlights the meaning and achievements of a person whose chosen trend keywords penetrated the entertainment industry, including broadcasting, movies, music, and performances, and presents the next vision of the cultural sector with outstanding achievements and influence.)

Year	Category	Work	Result	Ref.
2023	2023 Visionary	Kim Hye-soo	Won	

== State honors ==
Name of country, year given, and name of honor
Country	Organization	Year	Honor or Award	Ref.
South Korea	Financial Services Commission (Note: Honors are given at the Financial Day ceremony.)	2022	President's Citation	
South Korea	National Tax Service (Note: Honors are given at the Taxpayers' Day ceremony.)	2018	Presidential Commendation	

== Listicles ==
Name of publisher, year listed, name of listicle, and placement
Publisher	Year	Listicle	Placement	Ref.
Cine21	2021	Actress to watch out for in 2022	3rd	
Cine21	2022	Actress to watch out for in 2023	5th (Note: Tied with Lee Hanee)	
Forbes	2011	Korea Power Celebrity 40	19th	
Forbes	2017	Korea Power Celebrity 40	40th	
Forbes	2020	Korea Power Celebrity 40	34th	
Forbes	2022	Korea Power Celebrity 40	38th	
Forbes	2023	Korea Power Celebrity 40	37th	
Elle Japan	2022	Top 16 Hallyu Best Actress	3rd	
Gallup Korea	2008	Gallup Korea's Film Actor of the Year	3rd	
Gallup Korea	2010	Gallup Korea's Film Actor of the Year	7th	
Gallup Korea	2012	Gallup Korea's Film Actor of the Year	3rd	
Gallup Korea	2013	Gallup Korea's Film Actor of the Year	7th	
Gallup Korea	2017	Gallup Korea's Film Actor of the Year	12th	
Gallup Korea	2019	Gallup Korea's Film Actor of the Year	14th	
Gallup Korea	2020	Gallup Korea's Film Actor of the Year	9th	
Gallup Korea	2023	Gallup Korea's Film Actor of the Year	6th	
Gallup Korea	2023	Gallup Korea's Television Actor of the Year	8th (Note: Tied with Kim Hae-sook and Han Suk-kyu with 2.4% point)	
KBS	2023	The 50 people who made KBS shine	26th	
The Screen	2009	1984–2008 Top Box Office Powerhouse Actors in Korean Movies	8th	
The Screen	2019	2009–2019 Top Box Office Powerhouse Actors in Korean Movies	26th	
