= The Blue Road (TV series) =

2026 South Korean–Japanese television series

- Promotional poster
- Hangul: 푸른길
- RR: Pureungil
- MR: P'urŭn'gil
- Genre: Crime thriller; Hardboiled; Buddy cop
- Based on: Blue Road by: Keishi Edogawa; Kwon Kaya
- Written by: Cho Yu-jin; Han Jun-hee
- Directed by: Han Jun-hee
- Starring: Son Suk-ku; Eita Nagayama; Kim Shin-rok; Choi Sung-eun; Jung Jae-young
- Music by: Primary
- Opening theme: Blue Road by Meego and Primary
- Country of origin: South Korea
- Original languages: Korean; Japanese
- No. of episodes: 8

Production
- Executive producers: Kim Myung-jin; Yoon Hyun-ki
- Producer: Kim Dong-min
- Production locations: South Korea; Japan; Hong Kong; Kazakhstan
- Running time: 35–57 minutes
- Production company: Shotcake

Original release
- Network: Netflix
- Release: November 20, 2026

The Blue Road (Korean: 푸른길) is a 2026 South Korean–Japanese crime thriller television series written and directed by Han Jun-hee with Cho Yu-jin as co-writer and starring Son Suk-ku, Eita Nagayama, Kim Shin-rok, Choi Sung-eun, and Jung Jae-young. Based on the 2002 Korean-Japanese manhwa Blue Road by Keishi Edogawa and Kwon Kaya, the series follows two detectives from South Korea and Japan who must form an alliance to track down a serial killer staging a campaign of murders across both countries.

Produced by Shotcake, the series was filmed across four Asian countries. Three of its eight episodes premiered in the On Screen section of the 31st Busan International Film Festival on October 7, 2026, before its global release on Netflix on November 20.

== Synopsis ==
The case begins when a mutilated body is discovered in Tokyo bearing a chilling message written in Korean, quickly followed by a similarly disfigured corpse found in Seoul accompanied by a message in Japanese. To track down the serial killer responsible, an alliance is formed between Kim Seok and Inose. As the two detectives navigate contrasting styles and jurisdictional hurdles, the trail pulls them into a complex web involving a mysterious Korean-Japanese businesswoman named Ri Yoon-ok and recurring cryptic motifs, forcing them to unravel a dark international conspiracy.

== Cast and characters ==
=== Main ===
- Son Suk-ku as Kim Seok: A detective from the Seoul Metropolitan Police Agency's Mobile Investigation Unit
- Eita Nagayama as Inose Hiroshi: A detective from the Tokyo Metropolitan Police Department's First Investigation Division

=== Supporting ===
- Kim Shin-rok as Ri Yoon-ok: A Korean-Japanese businesswoman who has relationship with Yakuza and challenges both detectives
- Choi Sung-eun as Yoon Soo-kyung: A National Intelligence Service agent
- Jung Jae-young as Seo Hyun-tae: A mysterious figure in the underworld and Yoon-ok's mentor

2002 Serial Murder Case

- Kentaro Sakaguchi as Emi Shunsuke
  - Sōya Kurokawa as Emi Shunsuke (young)
- Kim Ji-an as Lee Hyun-seo, a drug addicted teenager girl
- Kwon Dong-ho as Sota Mikogami, a Japanese-Korean former photographer and hitman who worked for Yakuza
- Kim Jung-ho as Professor Jang Kyung-sub

Tokyo Metropolitan Police Department

- Takashi Ukaji as Kotaro Shimizu: Chief detective inspector of the Tokyo Metropolitan Police Department's First Investigation Division and Inose's superior
- Yosuke Asari as Fumiya Sagawa: A detective from the Tokyo Metropolitan Police Department's First Investigation Division and Inose's senior partner

Others

- Yōsuke Kubozuka as Takahashi: A local drug dealer
- Asami Mizukawa as Inose Erika, Inose's ex-wife
- Kim Ji-an and Ok Ja-yeon as young and adult version of Anastasia Kim

== Production ==
=== Development ===
The series was greenlit by Netflix under the working title Road. It is directed by Han Jun-hee, written by Cho Yu-jin and Han, and produced by Shotcake. The series is adapted from Blue Road, a co-produced 2002 Korean-Japanese manhwa written by Keishi Edogawa and illustrated by Kwon Kaya.

=== Casting ===
In February 2025, News1 reported that Son Suk-ku was reviewing an offer to star in the project. His casting marked his fourth collaboration with director Han, following the film Hit-and-Run Squad (2019) and the series D.P. (2021–2023). By September 2025, Netflix later announced that Son and Eita Nagayama would lead the series along with Kim Shin-rok, Choi Sung-eun, and Jung Jae-young.

=== Filming ===
Principal photography began in 2025 across South Korea, Japan, Hong Kong and Kazakhstan.

== Release ==
Netflix confirmed The Blue Road was scheduled to be released in the fourth quarter of 2026. In August 2026, BIFF announced that the series was selected as one of three drama series in the On Screen section of the 31st edition, where three of its eight episodes would be screened on October 7, 8, and 12. It was later confirmed that the series would premiere globally on November 20.

== Reception ==
Following a preview of the first three episodes at the Busan International Film Festival ahead of its November Netflix release, The Blue Road received a positive early review from the South China Morning Post. James Marsh noted that while serial killer thrillers are common on streaming services, the series distinguishes itself through tonal shifts between gruesome crimes and barbed banter between leads Son Suk-ku and Eita Nagayama, alongside historical tensions between South Korea and Japan during the 2002 World Cup and subtle fantastical elements. Concluding that the screened episodes left viewers "hooked", the review highlighted the series' evolving investigation and noted supporting performances from Yōsuke Kubozuka and Kim Shin-rok, as well as the forthcoming appearance of Jung Jae-young.
