= Baeksang Arts Award for Best New Actor – Television =

Annual award in South Korea

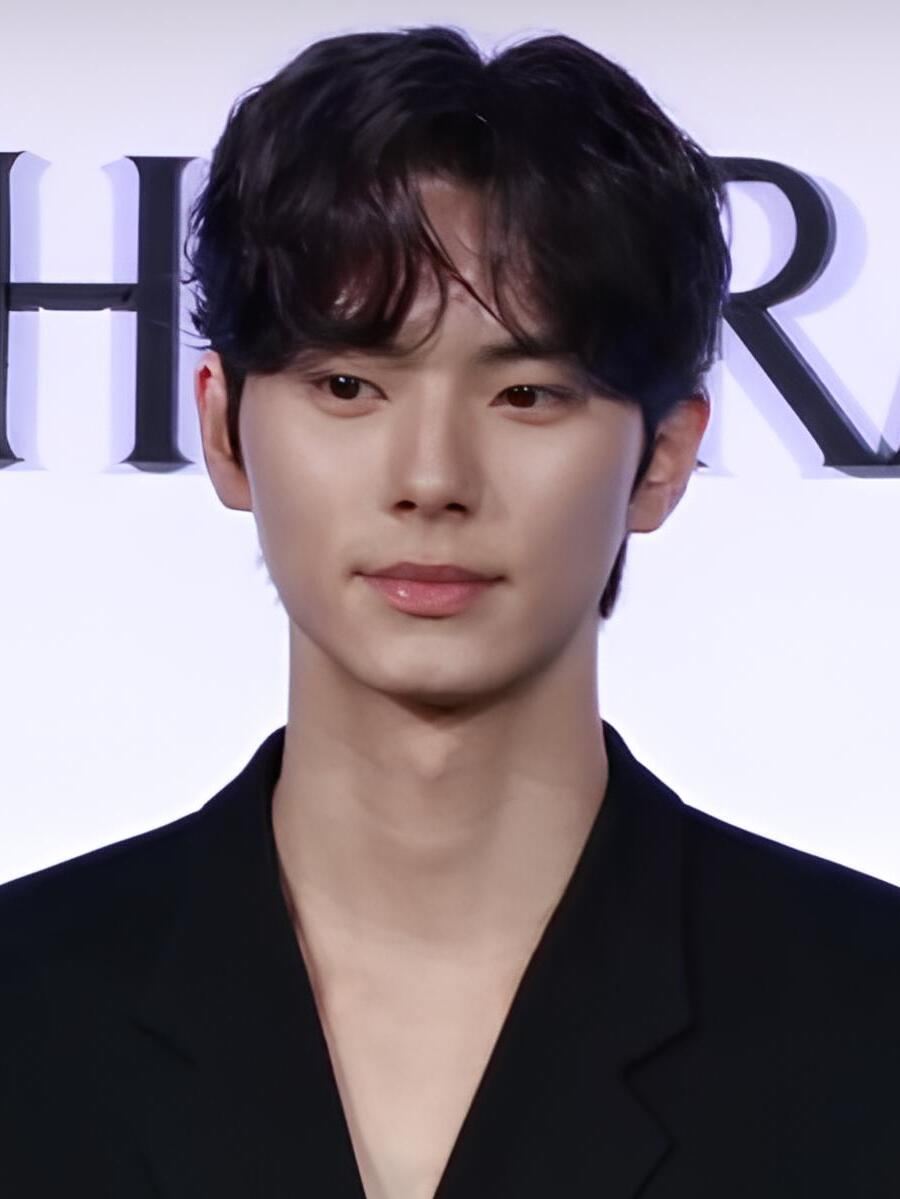
- 2026 recipient: Lee Chae-min
- Awarded for: Best performance by a new actor in a South Korean series
- Country: South Korea
- Presented by: Baeksang Arts Awards
- Most recent winner: Lee Chae-min; Bon Appétit, Your Majesty (2026)
- Website: baeksangartsawards

The Baeksang Arts Award for Best New Actor – Television (Korean: 백상예술대상 TV부문 남자 신인 연기상; RR: Baeksang Yesul Daesang TV Bumun Namja Sinin Yeongisang) is an award presented annually at the Baeksang Arts Awards ceremony organised by Ilgan Sports and JTBC Plus, affiliates of JoongAng Ilbo, usually in the second quarter of each year in Seoul.

== Winners and nominees ==
Table key
| ‡ | Indicates the winner |

=== 1970s ===
| Year | Winner and nominees | Television series | Original title | Role(s) | Network |
|---|---|---|---|---|---|
| 1974 (10th) | Kim In-moon ‡ | Mother | 어머니 | | TBC |
| 1975 (11th) | Gu Chung-seo ‡ | Our Mountains and Valleys | 꽃피는 팔도강산 | | KBS |
| 1975 (11th) | Hyun Seok ‡ | Narcissus | 수선화 | | MBC |
| 1978 (14th) | Lee Young-ha ‡ | The Door to Happiness | 행복의 문 | | KBS |
| 1979 (15th) | Jung Dong-hwan ‡ | Wild Geese | 기러기 | | KBS |

=== 1980s ===
| Year | Winner and nominees | Television series | Original title | Role(s) | Network |
|---|---|---|---|---|---|
| 1980 (16th) | Yu In-chon ‡ | Lady Angukdong | 안국동 아씨 | Crown Prince Sado | MBC |
| 1983 (19th) | Jung Han-yong ‡ | Ordinary People | 보통 사람들 | Lee Yung-nam | KBS1 |
| 1984 (20th) | Kang Seok-woo ‡ | Ordinary People | 보통 사람들 | Lee Kang-il | KBS1 |
| 1985 (21st) | Son Chang-min ‡ | The People I Love | 사랑하는 사람들 | | KBS1 |
| 1985 (21st) | Son Chang-min ‡ | Diary of a High School Student | 고교생 일기 | Sung-min | KBS1 |
| 1986 (22nd) | Choi Jae-sung ‡ | The Wild Horse Chasing the Stars | 별을 쫓는 야생마 | | KBS1 |
| 1987 (23rd) | Choi Sang-hoon ‡ | 500 Years of Joseon Dynasty - Namhansan Fortress | 조선왕조 오백년 - 남한산성 | Im Gyeong-up | MBC |
| 1988 (24th) | Jung Ha-wan ‡ | Plum Blossom | 이화 | Kim Seung-yo | KBS1 |
| 1989 (25th) | Park Sang-won ‡ | Human Market | 인간시장 | Jang Chong-chan | MBC |

=== 1990s ===
| Year | Winner and nominees | Television series | Original title | Role(s) | Network |
|---|---|---|---|---|---|
| 1990 (26th) | Kim Kap-soo ‡ | And So Flows History | 역사는 흐른다 | Jang Seok-ha | KBS1 |
| 1991 (27th) | Lee Won-young ‡ | The Land of Water | 물의 나라 | Han Gil-soo | KBS2 |
| 1992 (28th) | Chun Ho-jin ‡ | Love on a Jujube Tree | 대추나무 사랑걸렸네 | Hwang Dae-chul | KBS1 |
| 1993 (29th) | Son Ji-chang ‡ | Wind in the Grass | 억새 바람 | Lee Jin-soo | MBC |
| 1994 (30th) | Jang Dong-gun ‡ | The Last Match | 마지막 승부 | Yoon Chul-joon | MBC |
| 1995 (31st) | Lee Min-woo ‡ | Tale of Chunhyang | 춘향전 | Lee Mong-ryong | KBS2 |
| 1995 (31st) | Lee Jung-jae ‡ | Sandglass | 모래시계 | Baek Jae-hee | SBS |
| 1996 (32nd) | Jung Woo-sung ‡ | Asphalt Man | 아스팔트 사나이 | Kang Dong-seok | SBS |
| 1996 (32nd) | Ahn Jae-wook ‡ | Love and War | 전쟁과 사랑 | Kim Won-jae | MBC |
| 1997 (33rd) | Jung Heung-chae ‡ | Im Kkeokjeong | 임꺽정 | Im Kkeokjeong | SBS |
| 1998 (34th) | Lee Sang-in ‡ | There are Blue Birds | 파랑새는 있다 | Kim Byeong-dal | KBS2 |
| 1999 (35th) | Cha Tae-hyun ‡ | Sunflower | 해바라기 | Heo Jae-bong | MBC |

=== 2000s ===
| Year | Winner and nominees | Television series | Original title | Role(s) | Network |
|---|---|---|---|---|---|
| 2000 (36th) | Ahn Jae-mo ‡ | The King and the Queen | 왕과 비 | Prince Yeonsan | KBS1 |
| 2000 (36th) | Yoon Tae-young ‡ | Street King | 왕초 | Barefoot | MBC |
| 2001 (37th) | Won Bin ‡ | Autumn in My Heart | 가을동화 | Han Tae-seok | KBS2 |
| 2002 (38th) | Ryoo Seung-bum ‡ | Splendid Days | 화려한 시절 | Jang Cheol-jin | SBS |
| 2002 (38th) | Lee Seo-jin | Her House | 그 여자네 집 | Lee Joon-hee | MBC |
| 2002 (38th) | Zo In-sung | Piano | 피아노 | Lee Kyung-ho | SBS |
| 2003 (39th) | Yang Dong-geun ‡ | Ruler of Your Own World | 네 멋대로 해라 | Go Bok-su | MBC |
| 2003 (39th) | Kim Joo-hyuk | Like a Flowing River | 흐르는 강물처럼 | Kim Seok-joo | SBS |
| 2003 (39th) | Kim Sung-taek | Miss Mermaid | 인어아가씨 | Lee Joo-wang | MBC |
| 2004 (40th) | Kim Min-jun ‡ | Damo | 다모 | Jang Jae-mo / Jang Sung-baek | MBC |
| 2004 (40th) | Yeon Jung-hoon | Yellow Handkerchief | 노란손수건 | Yoon Tae-young | KBS1 |
| 2004 (40th) | Rain | Sang Doo! Let's Go to School | 상두야, 학교가자! | Cha Sang-doo | KBS2 |
| 2005 (41st) | Eric Mun ‡ | Super Rookie | 신입사원 | Kang Ho | MBC |
| 2005 (41st) | Hyun Bin | Ireland | 아일랜드 | Kang Gook | MBC |
| 2005 (41st) | Jae Hee | Sassy Girl Chun-hyang | 쾌걸 춘향 | Lee Mong-ryong | KBS2 |
| 2006 (42nd) | Chun Jung-myung ‡ | Fashion 70s | 패션 70s | Jang Bin | SBS |
| 2006 (42nd) | Ju Ji-hoon | Princess Hours | 궁 | Crown Prince Lee Shin | MBC |
| 2006 (42nd) | Kang Ji-hwan | Be Strong, Geum-soon! | 굳세어라 금순아 | Goo Jae-hee | MBC |
| 2007 (43rd) | Park Hae-jin ‡ | Famous Princesses | 소문난 칠공주 | Yeon Ha-nam | KBS2 |
| 2007 (43rd) | Lee Min-ki | Love Truly | 진짜 진짜 좋아해 | Nam Bong-ki | MBC |
| 2007 (43rd) | Lee Sun-kyun | Behind the White Tower | 하얀 거탑 | Choi Do-young | MBC |
| 2007 (43rd) | Oh Man-seok | The Vineyard Man | 포도밭 그 사나이 | Jang Taek-gi | KBS2 |
| 2007 (43rd) | Park Gun-hyung | When Spring Comes | 꽃피는 봄이 오면 | Lee Jung-do | KBS2 |
| 2008 (44th) | Song Chang-eui ‡ | Golden Bride | 황금신부 | Kang Jun Woo | SBS |
| 2008 (44th) | Ha Seok-jin | I am Happy | 행복합니다 | Kang-seok | SBS |
| 2008 (44th) | Han Sang-jin | Yi San | 이산 | Hong Guk-yeong | MBC |
| 2008 (44th) | Kim Ji-seok | Likeable or Not | 미우나 고우나 | Kang Baek-ho | KBS1 |
| 2008 (44th) | Lee Phillip | The Legend | 태왕사신기 | Cheoro | MBC |
| 2009 (45th) | Lee Min-ho ‡ | Boys Over Flowers | 꽃보다 남자 | Gu Jun-pyo | KBS2 |
| 2009 (45th) | Jung Gyu-woon | Women in the Sun | 태양의 여자 | Cha Dong-woo | KBS2 |
| 2009 (45th) | Kim Bum | East of Eden | 에덴의 동쪽 | Lee Dong-chul (15 years old) | MBC |
| 2009 (45th) | Lee Sang-woo | First Wives' Club | 조강지처 클럽 | Koo Se-joo | SBS |
| 2009 (45th) | Um Ki-joon | Worlds Within | 그들이 사는 세상 | Song Gyu-ho | KBS2 |

=== 2010s ===
| Year | Winner and nominees | Television series | Original title | Role(s) | Network |
|---|---|---|---|---|---|
| 2010 (46th) | Kim Nam-gil ‡ | Queen Seondeok | 선덕여왕 | Bidam | MBC |
| 2010 (46th) | Choi Daniel | High Kick Through the Roof | 지붕 뚫고 하이킥 | Lee Ji-hoon | MBC |
| 2010 (46th) | Lee Seung-gi | Brilliant Legacy | 찬란한 유산 | Sunwoo Hwan | SBS |
| 2010 (46th) | Yoo Seung-ho | Master of Study | 공부의 신 | Hwang Baek-hyun | KBS2 |
| 2010 (46th) | Yoon Shi-yoon | High Kick Through the Roof | 지붕 뚫고 하이킥 | Jeong Jun-hyeok | MBC |
| 2011 (47th) | Park Yoo-chun ‡ | Sungkyunkwan Scandal | 성균관 스캔들 | Yi Seon-jun | KBS2 |
| 2011 (47th) | Kim Soo-hyun | Dream High | 드림하이 | Song Sam-dong | KBS2 |
| 2011 (47th) | Kim Sung-oh | Secret Garden | 시크릿 가든 | Secretary Kim | SBS |
| 2011 (47th) | Ok Taec-yeon | Cinderella's Stepsister | 신데렐라 언니 | Han Jung-woo | KBS2 |
| 2011 (47th) | Park Jin-young | Dream High | 드림하이 | Yang Jin-man | KBS2 |
| 2012 (48th) | Joo Won ‡ | Ojakgyo Family | 오작교 형제들 | Hwang Tae-hee | KBS2 |
| 2012 (48th) | Kang Dong-ho | Twinkle Twinkle | 반짝반짝 빛나는 | Kang Dae-beom | MBC |
| 2012 (48th) | Park Yoon-jae | Iron Daughters-in-Law | 불굴의 며느리 | Moon Shin-woo | MBC |
| 2012 (48th) | Park Yu-hwan | A Thousand Days' Promise | 천일의 약속 | Lee Moon-kwon | SBS |
| 2012 (48th) | Yeo Jin-goo | Moon Embracing the Sun | 해를 품은 달 | young Lee Hwon | MBC |
| 2013 (49th) | Lee Hee-joon ‡ | My Husband Got a Family | 넝쿨째 굴러온 당신 | Chun Jae-yong | KBS2 |
| 2013 (49th) | Kim Woo-bin | School 2013 | 학교 2013 | Park Heung-soo | KBS2 |
| 2013 (49th) | Jo Jung-suk | The King 2 Hearts | 더킹 투하츠 | Eun Shi-kyung | MBC |
| 2013 (49th) | Lee Jung-shin | Seoyoung, My Daughter | 내 딸 서영이 | Kang Sung-jae | KBS2 |
| 2013 (49th) | Seo In-guk | Reply 1997 | 응답하라 1997 | Yoon Yoon-jae | tvN |
| 2014 (50th) | Jung Woo ‡ | Reply 1994 | 응답하라 1994 | "Sseureki" (Trash) | tvN |
| 2014 (50th) | Baro | God's Gift: 14 Days | 신의 선물 – 14일 | Ki Young-kyu | SBS |
| 2014 (50th) | Choi Jin-hyuk | Gu Family Book | 구가의 서 | Gu Wol-ryung | MBC |
| 2014 (50th) | Kim Sung-kyun | Reply 1994 | 응답하라 1994 | "Samcheonpo" | tvN |
| 2014 (50th) | Park Seo-joon | One Warm Word | 따뜻한 말 한마디 | Song Min-soo | SBS |
| 2015 (51st) | Yim Si-wan ‡ | Misaeng: Incomplete Life | 미생 - 아직 살아 있지 못한 자 | Jang Geu-rae | tvN |
| 2015 (51st) | Do Kyung-soo | It's Okay, That's Love | 괜찮아, 사랑이야 | Han Kang-woo | SBS |
| 2015 (51st) | Kim Dae-myung | Misaeng: Incomplete Life | 미생 - 아직 살아 있지 못한 자 | Kim Dong-shik | tvN |
| 2015 (51st) | Lee Joon | Heard It Through the Grapevine | 풍문으로 들었소 | Han In-sang | SBS |
| 2015 (51st) | Park Hyung-sik | What Happens to My Family? | 가족끼리 왜 이래 | Cha Dal-bong | KBS2 |
| 2016 (52nd) | Ryu Jun-yeol ‡ | Reply 1988 | 응답하라 1988 | Kim Jung-hwan | tvN |
| 2016 (52nd) | Ahn Jae-hong | Reply 1988 | 응답하라 1988 | Kim Jung-bong | tvN |
| 2016 (52nd) | Byun Yo-han | Six Flying Dragons | 육룡이 나르샤 | Yi Bang-ji | SBS |
| 2016 (52nd) | Lee Dong-hwi | Reply 1988 | 응답하라 1988 | Ryu Dong-ryong | tvN |
| 2016 (52nd) | Yook Sung-jae | Who Are You: School 2015 | 학교 2015 | Gong Tae-kwang | KBS2 |
| 2017 (53rd) | Kim Min-seok ‡ | The Doctors | 닥터스 | Choi Kang-soo | SBS |
| 2017 (53rd) | Gong Myung | Drinking Solo | 혼술남녀 | Jin Gong-myung | tvN |
| 2017 (53rd) | Kim Min-jae | Dr. Romantic | 낭만닥터 김사부 | Park Eun-tak | SBS |
| 2017 (53rd) | Ji Soo | Strong Girl Bong-soon | 힘쎈여자 도봉순 | In Guk-doo | JTBC |
| 2017 (53rd) | Jung Jin-young | Love in the Moonlight | 구르미 그린 달빛 | Kim Yoon-sung | KBS2 |
| 2018 (54th) | Yang Se-jong ‡ | Temperature of Love | 사랑의 온도 | On Jung-seon | SBS |
| 2018 (54th) | Kim Jung-hyun | School 2017 | 학교 2017 | Hyun Tae-woon | KBS2 |
| 2018 (54th) | Park Hae-soo | Prison Playbook | 슬기로운 감빵생활 | Kim Je-hyuk | tvN |
| 2018 (54th) | Woo Do-hwan | Save Me | 구해줘 | Suk Dong-chul | OCN |
| 2018 (54th) | Lee Kyu-hyung | Stranger | 비밀의 숲 | Yoon Se-won | tvN |
| 2019 (55th) | Jang Ki-yong ‡ | Come and Hug Me | 이리와 안아줘 | Chae Do-jin | MBC |
| 2019 (55th) | Park Sung-hoon | My Only One | 하나뿐인 내편 | Jang Go-rae | KBS2 |
| 2019 (55th) | Park Hoon | Memories of the Alhambra | 알함브라 궁전의 추억 | Cha Hyung-seok | tvN |
| 2019 (55th) | Son Suk-ku | Matrimonial Chaos | 최고의 이혼 | Lee Jang-hyun | KBS2 |
| 2019 (55th) | Wi Ha-joon | Romance Is a Bonus Book | 로맨스는 별책부록 | Ji Seo-joon | tvN |

=== 2020s ===
| Year | Winner and nominees | Television series | Original title | Role(s) | Network |
|---|---|---|---|---|---|
| 2020 (56th) | Ahn Hyo-seop ‡ | Dr. Romantic 2 | 낭만닥터 김사부2 | Seo Woo-jin | SBS |
| 2020 (56th) | Kim Kang-hoon | When the Camellia Blooms | 동백꽃 필 무렵 | Kang Pil-gu | MBC |
| 2020 (56th) | Ahn Bo-hyun | Itaewon Class | 이태원 클라쓰 | Jang Geun-won | JTBC |
| 2020 (56th) | Ong Seong-wu | At Eighteen | 열여덟의 순간 | Choi Joon-woo | JTBC |
| 2020 (56th) | Lee Jae-wook | Extraordinary You | 어쩌다 발견한 하루 | Baek Kyung | MBC |
| 2021 (57th) | Lee Do-hyun ‡ | 18 Again | 18 어게인 | Hong Dae-young (young) / Go Woo-young | JTBC |
| 2021 (57th) | Kim Young-dae | The Penthouse: War in Life | 펜트하우스 | Joo Seok-hoon | SBS |
| 2021 (57th) | Na In-woo | River Where the Moon Rises | 달이 뜨는 강 | On Dal | KBS2 |
| 2021 (57th) | Nam Yoon-su | Extracurricular | 인간수업 | Kwak Ki-tae | Netflix |
| 2021 (57th) | Song Kang | Sweet Home | 스위트홈 | Cha Hyun-soo | Netflix |
| 2022 (58th) | Koo Kyo-hwan ‡ | D.P. | 디피 | Han Ho-yul | Netflix |
| 2022 (58th) | Shin Seung-ho | D.P. | 디피 | Hwang Jang-soo | Netflix |
| 2022 (58th) | Yoo In-soo | All of Us Are Dead | 지금 우리 학교는 | Yoon Gwi-nam | Netflix |
| 2022 (58th) | Choi Hyun-wook | Twenty-Five Twenty-One | 스물다섯 스물하나 | Moon Ji-woong | tvN |
| 2022 (58th) | Tang Jun-sang | Racket Boys | 라켓소년단 | Yoon Hae-kang | SBS |
| 2023 (59th) | Moon Sang-min ‡ | Under the Queen's Umbrella | 슈룹 | Grand Prince Seongnam / Yi Kang | tvN |
| 2023 (59th) | Kim Gun-woo | The Glory | 더 글로리 | Son Myeong-oh | Netflix |
| 2023 (59th) | Kim Min-hoo | New Recruit | 신병 | Park Min-seok | ENA |
| 2023 (59th) | Joo Jong-hyuk | Extraordinary Attorney Woo | 이상한 변호사 우영우 | Kwon Min-woo | ENA |
| 2023 (59th) | Hong Kyung | Weak Hero Class 1 | 약한영웅 Class 1 | Oh Beom-seok | Wavve |
| 2024 (60th) | Lee Jung-ha ‡ | Moving | 무빙 | Kim Bong-seok | Disney+ |
| 2024 (60th) | Kim Yo-han | A Killer Paradox | 살인자ㅇ난감 | Roh Bin | Netflix |
| 2024 (60th) | Lee Si-woo | Boyhood | 소년시대 | Jeong Gyeong-tae | Coupang Play |
| 2024 (60th) | Lee Shin-ki | The Worst of Evil | 최악의 악 | Seo Jong-ryeol | Disney+ |
| 2024 (60th) | Lee Jong-won | Knight Flower | 밤에 피는 꽃 | Park Soo-ho | MBC |
| 2025 (61st) | Choo Young-woo ‡ | The Tale of Lady Ok | 옥씨부인전 | Song Seo-in / Cheon Seung-hwi / Sung Yoon-gyeom | JTBC |
| 2025 (61st) | Kim Jeong-jin | Doubt | 이토록 친밀한 배신자 | Choi Young-min | MBC |
| 2025 (61st) | Song Geon-hee | Lovely Runner | 선재 업고 튀어 | Kim Tae-seong | tvN |
| 2025 (61st) | Cha Woo-min | Study Group | 스터디그룹 | Pi Han-wool | TVING |
| 2025 (61st) | Heo Nam-jun | Your Honor | 유어 아너 | Kim Sang-hyuk | ENA |
| 2026 (62nd) | Lee Chae-min ‡ | Bon Appétit, Your Majesty | 폭군의 셰프 | Lee Heon | tvN |
| 2026 (62nd) | Kim Jin-wook | Low Life | 파인: 촌뜨기들 | Lee Bok-geun | Disney+ |
| 2026 (62nd) | Bae Na-ra | Weak Hero Class 2 | 약한영웅 Class 2 | Na Baek-jin | Netflix |
| 2026 (62nd) | Jung Joon-won | Resident Playbook | 언젠가는 슬기로울 전공의생활 | Ku Do-won | tvN |
| 2026 (62nd) | Hong Min-gi | To My Beloved Thief | 은애하는 도적님아 | Im Jae-yi | KBS2 |

== Sources ==
- "Baeksang Arts Awards Nominees and Winners Lists". Naver Movie (in Korean).
- "Baeksang Arts Awards Winners Lists". Baeksang Arts Awards (in Korean).
