= Bae Na-ra =

South Korean singer and actor

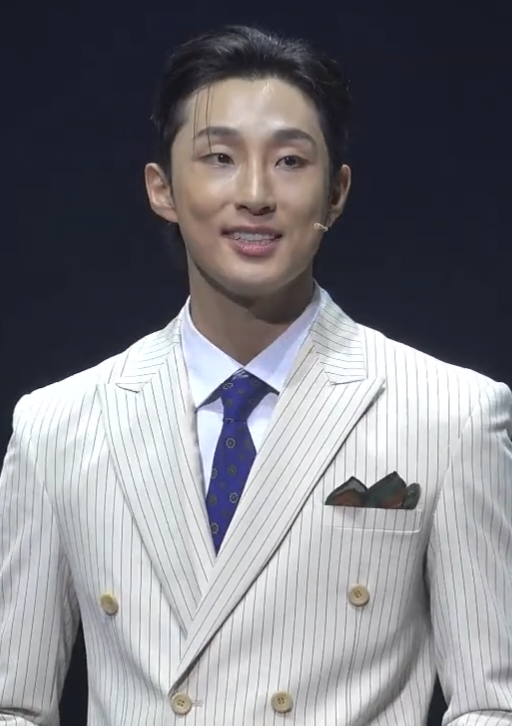
- Bae in 2025
- Born: Seoul, South Korea
- Education: Seoul Institute of the Arts – Musical Theatre
- Occupations: Singer; actor
- Years active: 2013–present
- Agent: YY Entertainment (2023–present)
- Spouse: Han Jae-ah (m. 2026)

Korean name
- Hangul: 배나라
- RR: Bae Nara
- MR: Pae Nara
- Website: Agency website

Bae Na-ra (Korean: 배나라) is a South Korean singer and actor. He debuted in 2013 through the musical PROMIS. He is best known for his roles as Na Baek-jin in Weak Hero Class 2 (2025) and Jang Sung-min in D.P. 2 (2023).

== Career ==
Bae Na-ra began his career in musical theatre and later expanded into television dramas. In 2023, he gained wider recognition for his performance in Netflix's D.P. 2. He subsequently appeared in Evilive (2023), and has starred in multiple 2025 dramas including Weak Hero Class 2, Tastefully Yours and Would You Marry Me?.

== Personal life ==
On November 14, 2026, Bae married fellow musical actress and singer Han Jae-ah after dating for seven years.

== Filmography ==
=== Television series ===
Year	Title	Role	Notes
2023	D.P. 2	Jang Sung-min	Cameo (Ep. 3)
2023	Evilive	Kwon Oh-jae	
2025	Weak Hero Class 2	Na Baek-jin	
2025	Tastefully Yours	Han Sun-woo	
2025	Would You Marry Me?	Baek Sang-hyun	
2025	The Manipulated	Woo Bi-nam	Cameo (Ep. 3–7)
2026	The Wonderfools	Kim Pal-ho	
TBA	The Shooter	Cheon Tae-seok	

=== Musicals ===
Year	Title	Role/Notes
2013	PROMIS	
2014	Zorro	
2015	ON AIR~Night Flight	
2015	Frankenstein	
2016	Jack the Ripper	
2017	Kyungsung Envoy	
2017	Rebecca	
2018	Kinky Boots	Angel
2018	The Bridges of Madison County	
2019	Grease	Sonny LaTierri
2020	Vanishing	
2020–2021	A Time for Cats and Dogs	Raptor
2021	Thrill Me	Richard Loeb
2021	The Devil	John Faust
2021	Wild Gray	Robert Ross
2022	Western Story	Billy Hooker
2022	Hymn of Death	
2022	Sidereus	Kepler
2022	West Side Story	Riff
2023	Eli	Eli
2025	Bonnie and Clyde	Clyde Barrow

=== Broadcasts ===
Year	Title	Role	Notes
2017	The Master	Special guest	Starred in episode 5 alongside Lim Sun-hye to perform "Il Bacio".
2020	Phantom Singer 3	Contestant	Auditioned with the song "Always Remember Us This Way" by Lady Gaga, Bae continued to appear in episode 5 to compete against Noh Yoon with the Itaewon Class OST "Stone Block".

== Discography ==
Year	Song Title	Album	Notes
2019	"Rock Star"	Non-album single	A single made by the band The T-Bird, which is a five-member boy group project under OD Entertainment and created to promote the musical Grease.
2022	"Even After A Long Time (Act 5: Conclusion: Man)"	Love Process	Love Process is a musical project created by NHN's Bugs! with 10 songs sung by 10 musical actors.

== Awards and nominations ==
Award	Year	Category	Work	Result	Ref.
Baeksang Arts Awards	2026	Best New Actor – Television	Weak Hero Class 2	Nominated	
Daejeon Special FX Film Festival (DFX OTT Awards)	2025	Excellence in Acting	Tastefully Yours	Won	
Korea Drama Awards	2025	Best New Actor	Weak Hero Class 2, Tastefully Yours	Nominated	
