= The First Lap =

- Directed by: Kim Dae-hwan
- Screenplay by: Kim Dae-hwan
- Produced by: Song Hyeon-yeong; Jang Woo-jin
- Starring: Kim Sae-byuk; Cho Hyun-chul
- Edited by: Kim Dae-hwan
- Production company: Bomnae Films
- Release dates: 29 April 2017 (JIFF); 7 December 2017 (South Korea)
- Running time: 99 minutes
- Country: South Korea
- Language: Korean

The First Lap (Korean: 초행; RR: Chohaeng) is a 2017 South Korean drama film, written, directed and edited by Kim Dae-hwan. It made its international premiere in the Filmmakers of the Present Competition at the 70th Locarno International Film Festival and won Best Emerging Director as well as received a Special Mention in the Junior Jury Awards.

== Synopsis ==
Ji-young (Kim Sae-byuk) and Soo-hyun (Cho Hyun-chul) have been living together for six years. Now, they have to deal with an unplanned pregnancy and also pressure from their families to get married.

== Cast ==
- Kim Sae-byuk as Ji-young
- Cho Hyun-chul as Soo-hyun
- Gi Ju-bong as Ji-young's father
- Jo Kyung-sook as Ji-young's mother
- Jung Do-won as Min-hyuk
- Moon Chang-gil as Soo-hyun's father
- Gil Hae-yeon as Soo-hyun's mother

== Awards and nominations ==
Year	Award	Category	Recipient	Result
2017	70th Locarno International Film Festival	Best Emerging Director	Kim Dae-hwan	Won
2017	70th Locarno International Film Festival	Junior Jury Awards	The First Lap	Special Mention
2017	Mar del Plata International Film Festival	Silver Astor for Best Screenplay	Kim Dae-hwan	Won
