= Weak Hero =

2022 South Korean television series

- Promotional poster for season one
- Hangul: 약한영웅
- RR: Yakhanyeongung
- MR: Yakhanyŏngung
- Genre: Coming-of-age; Action; Drama thriller
- Based on: Weak Hero by Seopass and Kim Jin-seok (Razen)
- Written by: Yoo Soo-min; Kim Jin-seok
- Directed by: Yoo Soo-min; Park Dan-hee
- Creative director: Han Jun-hee
- Starring: Park Ji-hoon; Choi Hyun-wook; Hong Kyung; Ryeoun; Choi Min-young; Lee Min-jae; Yoo Su-bin; Bae Na-ra; Lee Jun-young
- Theme music composer: Primary
- Opening theme: "Hero" (Prod. by Primary) by Meego
- Ending theme: "Homesick" (Prod. by Primary) by Benzamin
- Country of origin: South Korea
- Original language: Korean
- No. of seasons: 2
- No. of episodes: 16

Production
- Producers: Park Dan-hee; Yoo Soo-min
- Editor: Park Min-sun
- Running time: 36–54 minutes
- Production companies: Playlist Studio; Shortcake

Original release
- Network: Wavve
- Release: November 18, 2022
- Network: Netflix
- Release: April 25, 2025

Weak Hero (Korean: 약한영웅) is a South Korean television series written and directed by Yoo Soo-min with Kim Jin-seok and Park Dan-hee, starring Park Ji-hoon. It is based on the Naver webtoon Weak Hero by Seopass and Kim Jin-seok (Razen), which was published in 2018. The first three episodes premiered at the 27th Busan International Film Festival, which was held from October 5 to 14, 2022. The first season was released on Wavve on November 18, 2022. The second season was released on Netflix on April 25, 2025 as a Netflix Original.

== Synopsis ==
=== Class 1 ===
Yeon Si-eun is among the top 1% of students in his class and is not interested in anything except studying. Though physically weak, he does not back down from the bullies in his classroom led by Jeon Yeong-bin. Using his quick decision-making skills, knowledge of multiple subjects, and the objects in his surroundings, Si-eun protects himself from their escalating acts of violence. But when he gets in grave danger, he receives help from Ahn Su-ho, the strongest fighter in their class, and Oh Beom-seok, the tormented son of an assemblyman. The three become friends as they try to survive a high school life full of violence and learn what it truly means to be strong.

=== Class 2 ===
Si-eun has transferred to a new high school in Yeungdeungpo, Eunjang High School, and is still haunted by the trauma of his past failures. He builds new friendships with Park Hu-min, Seo Jun-tae, and Go Hyun-tak but must also face a more ruthless group known as the Union, an inter-school criminal gang led by Na Baek-jin and Geum Seong-je, which pushes him to confront even greater violence.

== Cast ==
=== Main ===
- Park Ji-hoon as Yeon Si-eun
  - Jang Jae-ha as young Yeon Si-eun

A model student in the top 1 of his class and a voluntary outsider who is only interested in his studies. He is physically weak so he protects himself with his quick analytical skills, knowledge of physics, and awareness of his surroundings. He has a pretty face but carries a lethargic expression. He is meticulous and usually quiet but is straightforward and curt in his speech, which can rub some the wrong way. When the lead bully in his classroom targets him out of jealousy, he does not back down and becomes entangled in a web of escalating violence. He gets unexpected help from Su-ho and Beom-seok, who become his allies and best friends.

- Choi Hyun-wook as Ahn Su-ho

A free spirit who is the strongest fighter in his class. He does not care much for school and only comes in every day because of a promise he made to his grandmother that he would graduate with perfect attendance. Because he works as a delivery driver for his family's restaurant at night, he often sleeps in class. He was once training to become an MMA fighter. He is loyal and kind but has a quick temperament, often using his strength and fighting skills to solve disagreements. After Beom-seok convinces him to help Si-eun, the three boys become good friends.

- Hong Kyung as Oh Beom-seok

A feeble and timid boy who wishes to become strong like the people around him. He was tormented relentlessly by bullies at his former school, forcing him to transfer. He is the adopted son of a wealthy assemblyman but experiences a tumultuous home life due to his father's physical and emotional abuse. His father claims to have adopted him simply as a publicity stunt. When he gets intimidated by Jeon Yeong-bin into helping him bully Si-eun, including sabotaging him in a test, he later wants to help Si-eun out of guilt and convinces Su-ho to come along. Though the three become friends and allies, Beom-seok's inferiority complex threatens to tear them apart.

- Ryeoun as Park Hu-min

A student at Eunjang High School. Nicknamed Baku, Hu-min is known for his strength and sense of justice. He becomes one of Si-eun's main allies from Eunjang in the fight against school violence.

- Choi Min-young as Seo Jun-tae

A student at Eunjang High School who was frequently bullied, but was inspired by Si-eun to fight back, and subsequently becomes one of Si-eun's ally from Eunjang.

- Lee Min-jae as Go Hyun-tak

A student at Eunjang High School. Nicknamed Gotak, he is a loyal friend of Hu-min, and is known for his physical strength and courage. He supports Si-eun in several battles against school bullies.

- Yoo Su-bin as Choi Hyo-man

The leader of Year 1 Class 3 at Eunjang High School, and the head of the delinquent students in the school.

- Bae Na-ra as Na Baek-jin

A model student at Yeoil High School who is clever and possesses good fighting skills. He is the leader of the Union and is the main antagonist of Weak Hero Class 2.

- Lee Jun-young as Geum Seong-je

A student at Kanghak High School. Seong-je is known for his brutality and loyalty to the Union. His presence intensifies the conflicts faced by Si-eun. He is Baek-jin's right-hand man.

=== Supporting ===
==== Class 1 ====
- Lee Yeon as Yeong-i

A courageous runaway who got involved with a dangerous gang of delinquents. She is bold and not shy around men, sometimes even joking about dating Si-eun. After her gang is dissolved, she stays with Su-ho for a while and starts working part-time at a restaurant. As she becomes closer friends with Si-eun and Su-ho, she becomes the target of Beom-seok's spiraling emotions.

- Shin Seung-ho as Jeon Seok-dae

The leader of a group of delinquents, who gets involved with Si-eun and his friends when his cousin Yeong-bin asks for his help with taking revenge on Si-eun. He appears indifferent but actually cares deeply for his friends, especially Yeong-i and the youngest member of the gang, Sung-chan.

- Kim Su-gyeom as Jeon Yeong-bin

A sadistic bully who targets Si-eun after he comes in second after him in a math competition. When Si-eun seems unfazed by his continuous threats, he resorts to increasingly more reckless and dangerous methods of bullying. After losing his first fight against Si-eun, he involves his cousin Seok-dae, a gang member, in their dispute and triggers a domino effect of escalating violence.

- Cha Woo-min as Kang Woo-young

A young MMA fighter who holds a grudge against Su-ho after losing a match against him in middle school.

- Na Cheol as Kim Gil-soo

The ruthless head of a group of delinquent runaways that coerces money out of teenagers through a rigged gambling app.

- Gong Hyun-joo as Si-eun's mother

A math lecturer that rarely spends time with her son due to her busy schedule. Si-eun often falls asleep to her online lectures.

- Kim Sung-kyun as Gyu-jin

Si-eun's father and a national judo coach. Like Si-eun's mother, he barely spends time with his son due to his work and constant business trips and is unaware of what his son is doing.

- Jo Han-chul as Oh Jin-won, Beom-seok's adoptive father. A wealthy but cruel and prideful assemblyman.
- Yeon Jeong-hoon as Lee Jeong-chan, one of Yeong-bin's henchmen
- Hwang Seong-bin as Han Tae-hoon, one of Yeong-bin's henchmen
- Yeom Ji-young as their homeroom teacher
- Shin Jun-chul as a Korean literature teacher
- Kim Hyun as the principal of Byeoksan High School
- Oh Dong-min as Assistant Park, Oh Jin-won's aide
- Jo Young-geun as Oh Jin-won's secretary
- Lee Jae-hak as a gang member
- Jeon Kang-ho as a gang member

==== Class 2 ====
- Oh Gi-gwang as Do Seong-mok

A member of the Union.

- Lee Myeong-ro as Baek Dong-ha

A member of the Union.

- Son Bo-seung as Seoknam Gorilla

A member who Baek-jin personally identifies as a potential member of the Union.

=== Special appearances ===
==== Class 1 ====
- Cha Sung-je as Sung-chan

A boy Jeon Seok-dae sees as his little brother.

- Jo Ah-young as Jeon Yeong-bin's friend (ep. 1)
- Jang Dae-woong as Kim Won-seok (eps. 2–3)
- Kang Jun-young as a police officer (ep. 3)
- Kim Tae-joon as a police officer (ep. 4)
- Kim Hyun as school principal (ep. 8)
- Byun Jung-hee as Ahn Su-ho's grandmother (ep. 8)

==== Class 2 ====
- Jo Jung-suk as Choi Chang-hee

A reputable gangster who handles a bowling alley, and thefts and sales of motorcycles. He is Baek-jin's boss who enlists his help in laundering the money earned.

- Jeon Bae-soo as Park Jin-chul

Hu-min's father who owns a fried chicken restaurant.

== Episodes ==
Season	Episodes	Originally released
1	8	November 18, 2022
2	8	April 25, 2025

=== Class 1 ===
No. overall	No. in season	Title	Original release date
1	1	"Episode 1"	November 18, 2022
Yeon Si-eun is completely focused on his studies, showing little interest for anything or anyone outside of them. When class bully Jeon Yeong-bin tries to get a rise out of him, Si-eun holds his ground. When his threats fall on deaf ears, Yeong-bin goes to great lengths to break through Si-eun's unimpressed demeanor, in which his plan goes awry.
2	2	"Episode 2"	November 18, 2022
After winning in a fight against Yeong-bin, Si-eun earns a fearsome reputation in his class. But this is not enough to deter an increasingly angry Yeong-bin from planning his next attack. A remorseful Oh Beom-seok gathers the courage to take responsibility for his actions and help Si-eun.
3	3	"Episode 3"	November 18, 2022
When Gil-soo sees his gang members beaten up, he gets furious and demands to meet the ones who did it. So, Yeong-bin deceives Si-eun, Beom-seok, and Su-ho and takes them to Gil-soo. Gil-soo breaks Jeon Seok-dae's arm and, as some sort of faux leverage, threatens the trio to bring him 15 million won in three days as compensation for the injury or he will kill them and their families. Si-eun asks the runaway Yeong-i for advice and devises a plan against Gil-soo with the information he gathers.
4	4	"Episode 4"	November 18, 2022
Their plan against Gil-soo fails and Si-eun finds Su-ho's blood on the floor at the gang's house. He calls Yeong-i for help, who makes her way to Gil-soo with Seok-dae while Si-eun follows them via a GPS tracking app. Meanwhile, Su-ho and Beom-seok are tied up by Gil-soo's gang.
5	5	"Episode 5"	November 18, 2022
While hanging out in a karaoke room with his friends, Beom-seok runs into the bullies from his previous school. Su-ho makes them apologize to him but Beom-seok thinks of it as an act of pity and isn't happy that Su-ho is ordering him around and thinks he's looking down on him. Si-eun becomes worried about Beom-seok when he becomes more and more withdrawn and seems to grow unstable.
6	6	"Episode 6"	November 18, 2022
Beom-seok befriends Jeong-chan and Tae-hoon and starts going to bars with them and, in turn, becomes a bully himself. Si-eun thinks Jeong-chan and Tae-hoon are using him because he is rich and that Beom-seok is only behaving that way because he's lonely and insecure. He wants to help Beom-seok but Su-ho thinks he's already done enough. The tension between Beom-seok and Su-ho grows until Beom-seok pays the UFC fighter Woo-young to beat up Su-ho on his birthday.
7	7	"Episode 7"	November 18, 2022
Si-eun and Yeong-i plan Su-ho's birthday party when Yeong-i receives a message from Beom-seok, who says he needs her help to apologize to Su-ho. This is, however, a trick by Beom-seok to lure in Su-ho and he sends a photo of the kidnapped Yeong-i to him. When Si-eun sees it instead and goes to rescue Yeong-i, he gets seriously injured but doesn't tell Su-ho to protect both him and Beom-seok. When Su-ho eventually finds out, he confronts Beom-seok and his friends, who then pays Woo-young again to beat up Su-ho. Su-ho gets the upper hand in the battle, yet is tripped by Tae-hoon and is subsequently knocked down by Woo-young. All the bullies, including Beom-seok and Woo-young, jump the beaten Su-ho, therefore putting him into a coma.
8	8	"Episode 8"	November 18, 2022
Si-eun and Yeong-i get anxious when they can't get a hold of Su-ho for a long time. In the middle of his finals, Si-eun hears the shocking news of what happened to Su-ho and goes to take revenge out on Yeong-bin, Woo-young, Beom-seok, and their friends. Meanwhile, Beomseok's father tries to cover up the incident by sending Beom-seok abroad. With Su-ho still comatose, the series ends with Si-eun being transferred to another school and being confronted by another student.

=== Class 2 ===
No. overall	No. in season	Title	Original release date
9	1	"Episode 1"	April 25, 2025
Si-eun is struggling to sleep. He visits Su-ho occasionally and goes to sleep at school. Seo Jun-tae steals his phone to impress Choi Hyo-man, and Si-eun calls him a coward. He visits Su-ho again and explains everything that's been happening. Jun-tae returns every last phone he and his friends stole, including Si-eun's, but Hyo-man begins beating him when he finds out. Si-eun stops the fight, telling Hyo-man to not "cross the line".
10	2	"Episode 2"	April 25, 2025
Hyo-man begins repeatedly punching and kicking Si-eun, but Si-eun gets up continuously. Go Hyun-tak/Gotak learns of what's going on and stops the fight, intimidating Hyo-man. Gotak then learns of the rumors as of why Si-eun had to transfer to Eunjang High, but he seemingly doesn't believe it. Hyo-man schemes to instigate a fight between Si-eun and Gotak. He tells Si-eun that Gotak wants to fight him, destroys the basketball team's clubhouse, and traps Jun-tae in the clubhouse locker. Si-eun frees Jun-tae from the locker, then Hyo-man tells Gotak that Si-eun wants to talk to him in the clubhouse. As Si-eun leaves the clubhouse, Gotak enters and sees that it's been destroyed. Him and Si-eun then fight, then afterwards, Hyo-man's gang jumps Gotak as Hyo-man attacks Si-eun with a bat. Someone then stops the fight.
11	3	"Episode 3"	April 25, 2025
Park Hu-min/Baku saves Gotak, Si-eun, and Jun-tae, defeating Hyo-man and his gang, and Gotak apologizes to Si-eun. The next day, Si-eun, Gotak, Jun-tae, and Baku are ordered to do community service, even though they didn't start the fight. Si-eun is attacked in the bathroom by Seong-je, and the latter then has a confrontation with Baku. Baku finds out about Si-eun and Seong-je's fight and immediately runs to check on Si-eun. Na Baek-jin, similar to Si-eun, uses quick-thinking to win a fight against Hyo-man and his gang. Si-eun visits Su-ho, and is confronted by Seong-je at the hospital, who begins playfully threatening him.
12	4	"Episode 4"	April 25, 2025
Seong-je takes Si-eun to the Union's hideout, where the latter has a meeting with Baek-jin. Si-eun warns Baek-jin not to go or send anyone to Su-ho's hospital. He then tells Baek-jin how to solve a math problem that the latter was struggling with. Seong-je once again threatens Si-eun as he leaves. Baek-jin sends some goons to Baku's father's restaurant with fake IDs, infuriating Baku's father. One of the goons gives Baku a message from Baek-jin, right before the latter calls Baku. Si-eun tells Gotak, Jun-tae, and Baku that he met Baek-jin, then tells the group to leave him alone. He is then caught by some Union kids, but remember that Baek-jin instructed them to leave him alone. Those same Union kids see Gotak and Jun-tae walking alone and call Seong-je. The latter confronts the two, and Gotak tells Jun-tae to run. The Union kids catch Jun-tae as he's on the phone with Si-eun, causing the latter to rush back. Seong-je and the Union kids bring Jun-tae and Gotak to a rooftop while Baku meets with Baek-jin. Baek-jin tells Baku of the plan, and the latter begins rushing back to Gotak and Jun-tae after beating up a bunch of Union kids. Seong-je beats Gotak, then Si-eun arrives. After a brutal beating, Si-eun defeats Seong-je, knocking himself out in the process. Baku finally arrives as Si-eun begins speaking to Su-ho in his head.
13	5	"Episode 5"	April 25, 2025
Baku feels guilty for Gotak, Jun-tae and Si-eun as he feels he is the reason they were hurt. Si-eun tries to tell Baku not to follow the cycle of violence and rather break it. While the gang is chilling in the playground, Baku is once again called to the police station since Baek-jin's gang framed his father for accepting underage students. Eventually Baku is pushed in to the corner, until and unless he accepts the Union's offer and ends up accepting it. Meanwhile, Si-eun, after a fight with his distressed mother, decides to study abroad for the remainder of high school. While Si-eun is waiting for his flight in the airport, Jun-tae calls him to let him know what happened to his friend was not his fault. With that, Si-eun makes the choice to stay in Korea with his friends.
14	6	"Episode 6"	April 25, 2025
Si-eun, Jun-tae, and Gotak search for Baku, who has decided to work with Baek-jin to keep the peace, though Baku struggles to accept it. Hyo-man reveals that Daesung Bikes is involved in stealing bikes, selling them unregistered, then re-stealing them using spare keys. While Si-eun confronts Baek-jin, asking him to leave Baku alone, Go-tak and Jun-tae break into Daesung Bikes, find a list of illegal vehicles, and take it. Baek-jin later shows this footage to Si-eun and warns that his men are heading there to attack them. Si-eun rushes to help, but midway, he gets a call from Ahn Su-ho's hospital saying Su-ho is in critical condition. Shocked, he freezes in the street as a vehicle approaches and is hit.
15	7	"Episode 7"	April 25, 2025
Baku quits working for Baek-jin and rushes to save Go-tak and Jun-tae, fighting off the attackers and nearly losing control before Jun-tae gets a call about Si-eun's accident. They race to the hospital and are devastated to see Si-eun unconscious; after he's moved to a room, his distressed mother turns them away. Jun-tae tries to take the list of illegal bikes to the police, but it's rejected for lack of evidence, and he's later caught and beaten by Baek-jin's gang, refusing to betray his friends even then. Seong-je saves him from further harm and calls Baku to pick him up. Baku's father, seeing his son's struggle, returns the money he once gave and tells him not to worry, prompting Baku to break down in tears over Si-eun's condition. The next day, Baku goes to Baek-jin's school with a megaphone and publicly challenges the union, declaring that if Eunjang High wins, they must disband. While waiting outside Si-eun's room, his mother apologizes and invites Baku in. Meanwhile, Si-eun, still unconscious, dreams of Oh Beom-seok warning him that everything will only lead to pain, but he wakes up, calling out for Su-ho. Si-eun is reassured that Su-ho is okay. Jun-tae cries when he learns that Si-eun is okay, and Si-eun asks about Baek-jin.
16	8	"Episode 8"	April 25, 2025
Si-eun begins planning the fight strategically, using divide-and-conquer tactics and exposing the union's secret finances with help from Seong-je. On the day of the fight, Seong-je calls Si-eun claiming he has more evidence, but betrays him and nearly incapacitates him. With Jun-tae's help, Si-eun makes it back to the battleground, where a fierce fight erupted between Eunjang High and the union. Baku nearly defeats Baek-jin, but Baek-jin counters and knocks him to the ground. Just as Baek-jin declares victory, Si-eun reappears, and a brutal showdown follows. As Si-eun is defeated, Baku rises, ultimately defeating Baek-jin. Baek-jin then disappears, and shortly after, Su-ho wakes up, reuniting with Si-eun. In the post-credits scene, the CEO Choi of the bowling alley approaches Seong-je as Baek-jin's replacement, and Baku and the gang are seen crying at Baek-jin's funeral.

== Production ==
=== Development ===
It was announced by Jaedam Media in May 2021 that they had reached an agreement with Playlist to co-produce a drama adaptation of the popular Naver webtoon Weak Hero. It was later confirmed that Shortcake, the studio co-founded by director and screenwriter Han Jun-hee (Netflix's D.P.), would also be producing the drama. Yu Su-min, who had recently won Best Film at the Mise-en-scène Short Film Festival, would direct and write the series while Han would serve as creative director. For the action choreography and stunts, martial arts director Heo Myeong-haeng (Vincenzo) would direct and Ahn Ji-Hye (Squid Game) would serve as art director. The original soundtrack would be produced by Primary.

To create the gloomy and cold atmosphere the titular character is known for, Park Ji-hoon took inspiration from Won Bin's performance in The Man from Nowhere (2010) as well as Kwon Sang-woo in Once Upon a Time in High School (2004). The climax at the end of eighth episode is a direct homage to the final scene in the latter. Park also lost over 10 pounds of muscle to achieve Si-eun's weak appearance. The cast attended action school together for several months so they could safely film the intense action sequences.

=== Casting ===
==== Class 1 ====
In an interview to the press on November 30, 2022, director Han Jun-hee went into depth about the casting process for Weak Hero: Class One. Han had previously stated that they wanted to "invite actors who have great energy and could lead the next generation of Korean dramas and film." He said Park Ji-hoon, Choi Hyun-wook, Hong Kyung, Shin Seung-ho, and Lee Yeon were all new actors and that he believed Weak Hero to be an opportunity to introduce them to a wider audience and foster their careers. On the casting of Park Ji-hoon as the lead, Han revealed that the idol actor was originally suggested by Shotcake CEO and co-founder Lee Myung-jin. Lee was amazed with Park's performance in At a Distance, Spring Is Green (2021) and Han found it amazing as well when he viewed it. After reviewing more of Park's work and interviews, Han was convinced he could show various faces and wanted to see if one could be that of a universal student in his late teens. He believed director Yu felt something similar when the suggestion was brought to him. Han went on to further praise Park as "the only actor in his 20's that could create such an atmosphere" and commended his great attitude and consideration for the staff on set. On Choi Hyun-wook's casting, Han said that he first saw him in Taxi Driver (2021) and was curious about him, but it was his appearance in Racket Boys (2021) that made him call right away as he believed that Choi would become a difficult actor to get a hold of. Overall, Han stated, it was intuition and he found it fortunate that this cast was able to take the drama.

==== Class 2 ====
Park Ji-Hoon reprise his titular role for the second season alongside Ryeoun, Choi Min-Young, Yoo Su-bin, Bae Na-ra, Lee Min-Jae and Lee Jun-young.

=== Promotion ===
On September 22, 2022, the official trailer video of Weak Hero Class 1 was released on the official website of the Busan International Film Festival, YouTube channel, and Wave YouTube channel, while the second trailer and poster were released on November 7. As the official sponsor for 27th Busan International Film Festival, Wavve installed several brand booth including a photo zone for Weak Hero Class 1 at the Haeundae Beach. On the premier day of 27th BIFF, director Yoo Soo-min, creative director Han Jun-hee, and actors Park Ji-hoon, Choi Hyun-wook, Hong Kyung, Shin Seung-ho and Lee Yeon attended the festival's open talk event held at the Busan Cinema Center in Haeundae District.

The press conference and production presentation for the drama was held on November 16, 2022, at CGV Yongsan I-Park Mall in Seoul.

Wavve held the largest ticket discount event to mark the opening of its original drama Weak Hero Class 1. Wavve sells annual tickets at a 41% discount for 13 days from 10:00 (KST) on the day of its released. This marks the first time that a 12-month pass for all premium, standard, and basic products is offered at a discounted price.

A choreography video for the second title track, "Brass Knuckle", was released on December 15, 2022, by Prime Kingz, a world-class crump dance team.

In April 2025, the cast of Weak Hero Class 2 were featured in an interview with ABS-CBN News (Philippines).

== Release ==
In February 2022, Wavve unveiled their thirty contents lineup for 2022, including Weak Hero which was scheduled to release in the second half of 2022.

The series premiered at 27th Busan International Film Festival in the "Onscreen Section" on October 7, 2022, where three episodes out of eight were shown as a world premiere and then screened on October 8 and 11, and will be exclusively released all episodes in November. The tickets to the world premiere on October 7 were sold out in two minutes.

It was released exclusively on Wavve at 11:00 (KST) on November 18, 2022, with a viewing rating of 18+. The drama was simultaneously aired on Viki United States, iQIYI USA and Taiwan, Kocowa United States, Amazon Prime, Comcast, Google TV, and The Roku Channel. In December 2022, Viki, a platform specializing in Asian content, has additionally confirmed airing in Europe, Oceania, the Middle East, and India following the released in the United States.

In December 2023, the second season was confirmed to be released on Netflix. A teaser trailer was released on April 1, 2025, confirming that release date for the second season was on April 25 of the same year.

== Original soundtrack ==
Weak Hero Class 1 Original Soundtrack

Soundtrack album by Various artists
- Released: November 28, 2022
- Genres: Soundtrack; Rock
- Language: Korean
- Labels: Genie; Stone; Playlist

The Weak Hero Class 1 Original Soundtrack album consists of 5 tracks, including the two singles "Hero (Prod. by Primary)" by Meego and "Brass Knuckle" by Boi. B. The tracks with no indicated lyricists and composers are the drama's musical score; the artists indicated for these tracks are the tracks' composers themselves.

No.	Title	Lyrics	Music	Artist	Length
1.	"Hero (Prod. by Primary)"	Meego	Primary; Meego	Meego	3:56
2.	"Brass Knuckle"	Boi. B	h4rdy	Boi. B	2:30
3.	"Homesick (Prod. by Primary)"	Benzamin	Primary; Benzamin	Benzamin	4:38
4.	"Self"	Meego	1of1; Meego	Meego	3:22
5.	"Again"	Han	Han	Han	2:28
6.	"Hero (Prod. by Primary)" (Inst.)		Primary; Meego		3:56
7.	"Brass Knuckle" (Inst.)		h4rdy		2:30
8.	"Homesick" (Inst.)		Primary; Benzamin		4:38
9.	"Self" (Inst.)		1of1; Meego		3:22
10.	"Again" (Inst.)		Han		2:28
Total length:					33:50

== Reception ==
Following the success of the drama, the cast and crew went on a five-day reward vacation to Nha Trang, Vietnam.

=== Critical response ===
After being screened at the 27th Busan International Film Festival, Weak Hero was evaluated as a well-made drama from the point of the story, directing, acting, and music and was considered one of the most anticipated drama in the second half of the year.

YTN's Kim Seong-hyun consider "the most eye-catching work among numerous contents this year", praising the drama for its "appropriate balance of power between the characters shown by the three actors and the different charms they add to the densely packed story and the unpredictable development", with high-intensity action, which is "overflowing with a sense of impact and yet in touch with reality", and "Primary music filled with lyrical yet sensuous melodies". Sudarshana Ganguly of The Telegraph Indian named the drama as the best one of the week and gave it a rating of 4.5/5 stars saying that it "stands out with its striking realism. It does not show a redeeming avenger but rather, flawed characters who often get caught up in the very cycle they are trying to break." She praised Park Ji-hoon for his "nuanced acting, down to his expressions, [and the] delivery of subtle emotions", and Choi Hyun-wook's "charismatic character that stands out on his own". Writing for Forbes, Joan MacDonald opined that the drama "offers plenty of surprises and interesting character development. Intense, fast-paced and well-acted, [it is] a look at how devastating bullying can be." Kim Soo-hyun of The Chosun Ilbo wrote that the interesting points of the series are the realistic story of Si-eun, Su-ho, and Beom-seok, raw fresh and original action movements that have never been seen anywhere else, the three lead actors (Park Ji-hoon, Choi Hyun-wook, and Hong Kyung) who have established themselves as 'trustworthy actors' among the rising stars, and the remarkable directing. Kim concluded by saying that Weak Hero is "the best work in the second half of 2022". Park Jin-young of JoyNews24 wrote that the series "enhances the sense of reality by containing the worries that everyone has experienced at least once in their adolescence, such as the bond with friends, a sense of belonging somewhere, and the desire to take a step forward for a better future." Drama critic Gong Hee-jeong said, "Although the action scenes are stimulating and horrifying, the point that makes us think about the faults of adults beyond children's violence by sufficiently capturing the position and inner feelings of each character stands out." Culture critic Jung Deok-hyeon analyzed, "At the point when you think about what kind of conflict there will be a new sense of immersion is formed as problems within the children's relationship erupt." Several Korean medias dubbed Choi Hyun-wook's character Ahn Su-ho as the "Fighter of Loyalty".

=== Viewership ===
Weak Hero's popularity was driven primarily through word of mouth and positive comments on social media and communities. The drama became an overnight hit, immediately becoming Wavve's number one drama in paid subscribers within the first day, garnering a 9.9 rating overseas through iQIYI, Kocowa, and Viki, and glowing reviews from critics. According to the data compiled by Good Data Corporation, it ranked first in the 'OTT Topic' drama/series category for four consecutive weeks. According to Wavve, Weak Hero was the first OTT series to rank in Kocowa top 3 for viewing time and remained in the top 10 ranking on iQiyi Taiwan and North America. It also ranked second in the rankings for the 3rd week of November 19–25, compiled by OTT integrated search site Kinolights. According to data from Showlabs, Weak Hero ranked tenth on Netflix in the United States during the week of 24–30 March 2025.

=== Accolades ===
List of awards and nominations received by Weak Hero Class 1
Award	Year	Category	Recipient(s)	Result	Ref.
Asia Contents Awards & Global OTT Awards	2023	Best Newcomer Actor	Park Ji-hoon	Nominated	
Asia Contents Awards & Global OTT Awards	2023	Best OTT Original	Weak Hero Class 1	Won	
Baeksang Arts Awards	2023	Best New Actor	Hong Kyung	Nominated	
Blue Dragon Series Awards	2023	Best Drama	Weak Hero Class 1	Nominated	
Blue Dragon Series Awards	2023	Best New Actor	Park Ji-hoon	Won	
Blue Dragon Series Awards	2023	Whynot Award	Choi Hyun-wook	Won	
Korea Drama Awards	2023	Best New Actor	Park Ji-hoon	Won	

List of awards and nominations received by Weak Hero Class 2
Award ceremony	Year	Category	Recipient(s)	Result	Ref.
Baeksang Arts Awards	2026	Best New Actor	Bae Na-ra	Nominated	
Blue Dragon Series Awards	2025	Best Supporting Actor	Lee Jun-young	Nominated	
16th Korea Drama Awards	2025	Excellence Award, Actor	Lee Jun-young	Nominated	
16th Korea Drama Awards	2025	Excellence Award, Actor	Park Ji-hoon	Nominated	
16th Korea Drama Awards	2025	Best New Actor	Ryeo-un	Nominated	
16th Korea Drama Awards	2025	Best New Actor	Bae Na-ra	Nominated	
2025 Brand of the Year Awards	2025	Male Actor (Rising Star) Category	Lee Jun-young	Won	
10th DAP Awards	2025	Melo Romance Pass Award	Lee Jun-young	Won	
7th Daejeon Special Film Festival	2025	Best Actor	Park Ji-hoon	Won	
Fundex Awards	2025	Best of OTT Original Drama	Weak Hero Class 2	Nominated	
Fundex Awards	2025	Best Supporting Actor of OTT Original Drama	Lee Jun-young	Won	
Fundex Awards	2025	Popular Star Prize – K-Drama Actor	Park Ji-hoon	Won	
10th Asia Artist Awards	2025	Best Actor – Male	Lee Jun-young	Won	

Year-end lists for Weak Hero Class 1
Critic/Publication	List	Rank	Ref.
Cosmopolitan	Cosmopolitan: Favorite K-Dramas Of 2022	6	
Forbes	The 20 Best Korean Dramas Of 2022	Placed	
Manila Bulletin	10 Best Korean Dramas of 2022	10	
South China Morning Post	The 15 Best K-dramas of 2022	10	
Teen Vogue	The 11 Best K-Dramas of 2022 to Watch Immediately	Placed	
Teen Vogue	27 Best K-Dramas of All Time	Placed	
