= Cho Hyun-chul =

South Korean actor

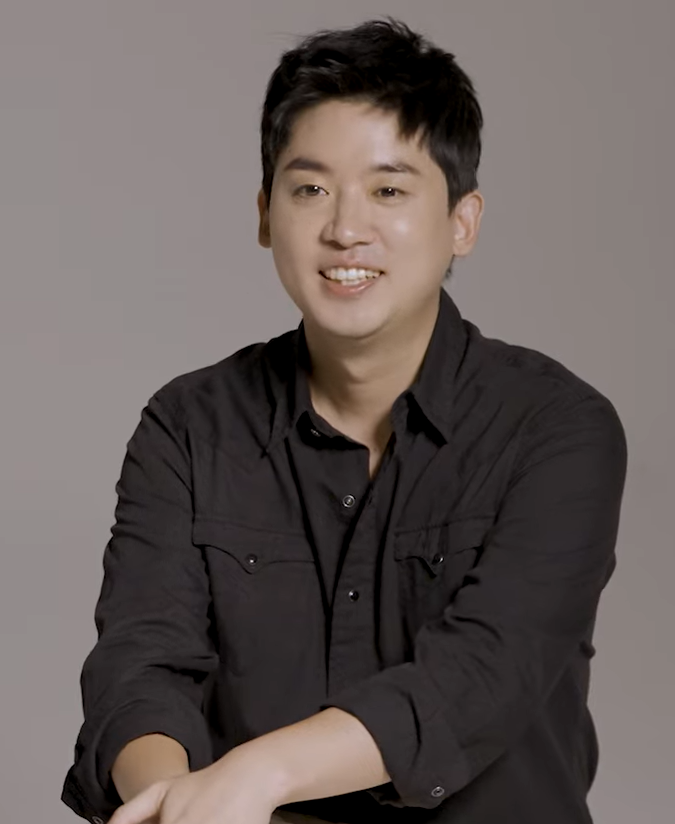
- Cho in October 2022
- Born: December 24, 1986 (age 39); Seoul, South Korea
- Education: Korea National University of Arts
- Occupations: Actor; director
- Years active: 2010–present
- Agent: Management MMM
- Relatives: Mad Clown (brother)

Korean name
- Hangul: 조현철
- RR: Jo Hyeoncheol
- MR: Cho Hyŏnch'ŏl

Cho Hyun-chul (Korean: 조현철; born December 24, 1986) is a South Korean actor. He gained recognition for his roles in the television series Hotel del Luna (2019), D.P. (2021–2023), Inspector Koo (2021), as well as the films The First Lap (2017) and Samjin Company English Class (2020).

== Filmography ==
=== Film ===
Year	Title	Role	Notes	Ref.
2009	Love in the Time of Allergy		as director and screenwriter	
2010	Pitpat Wing Chun	Hyun-cheol	Short film	
2012	Architecture 101	Dong-gu		
2014	Romance in Seoul		as Co-director and screenwriter	
2015	Coin Locker Girl	Hong-joo		
2015	Robot Revival		as director	
2016	Tunnel	Rescue team member		
2016	Master	Ahn Kyung-nam		
2016	My Sister Is Dead	Ha-neul	Short film	
2017	The First Lap	Soo-hyun		
2019	Mal-Mo-E: The Secret Mission	Park Bong-doo		
2019	The King of the Border	Dong-cheol		
2019	Film Adventure	Young-hwa		
2020	Samjin Company English Class	Choi Dong-soo		
2020	Best Friend	Young-cheol		
2022	The Dream Songs		as director, Premiere at 27th BIFF	
2024	Bogotá: City of the Lost	Jae Woong		

=== Television series ===
Key
†	Denotes television productions that have not yet been released

Year	Title	Role	Notes	Ref.
2017	Argon	Heo Jong-tae		
2019	Memories of the Alhambra	Choi Yang-joo		
2019	Hotel del Luna	Sanchez		
2019	The Lies Within	Park Seong-jae	Cameo	
2021	Inspector Koo	Oh Kyung-soo		
2021–2023	D.P.	Jo Suk-bong	Season 1 and 2	
2023	One Day Off	Art teacher	Cameo	
2023	Revenant	shaman	Cameo (episode 7)	
2025	Aema	Kwak In-woo		
2025	You and Everything Else	Han Jae-jun	Cameo	
2026	Dead-End Job	Cinephile	Cameo (episode 4)	
2026	Happy Anding	Kim Nam-il		
TBA	Pleasant Outcast †	Young-gyun		

== Awards and nominations ==
Year	Award	Category	Nominated work	Result	Ref.
2010	36th Seoul Independent Film Festival	Jury's Special Mention	Love in the Time of Allergy	Won	
2010	4th Great Short Film Festival	KT & G Gold Crown Award	Love in the Time of Allergy	Won	
2019	23rd Bucheon International Fantastic Film Festival	Best Actor	Film Adventure	Won	
2019	7th Wildflower Film Awards	Best Actor	Film Adventure	Nominated	
2022	20th Director's Cut Awards	Best New Actor – Television	D.P.	Won	
2022	58th Baeksang Arts Awards	Best Supporting Actor – Television	D.P.	Won	
2024	Baeksang Arts Awards	Best New Director – Film	The Dream Songs	Nominated	
