= Hong Kyung =

South Korean actor (born 1996)

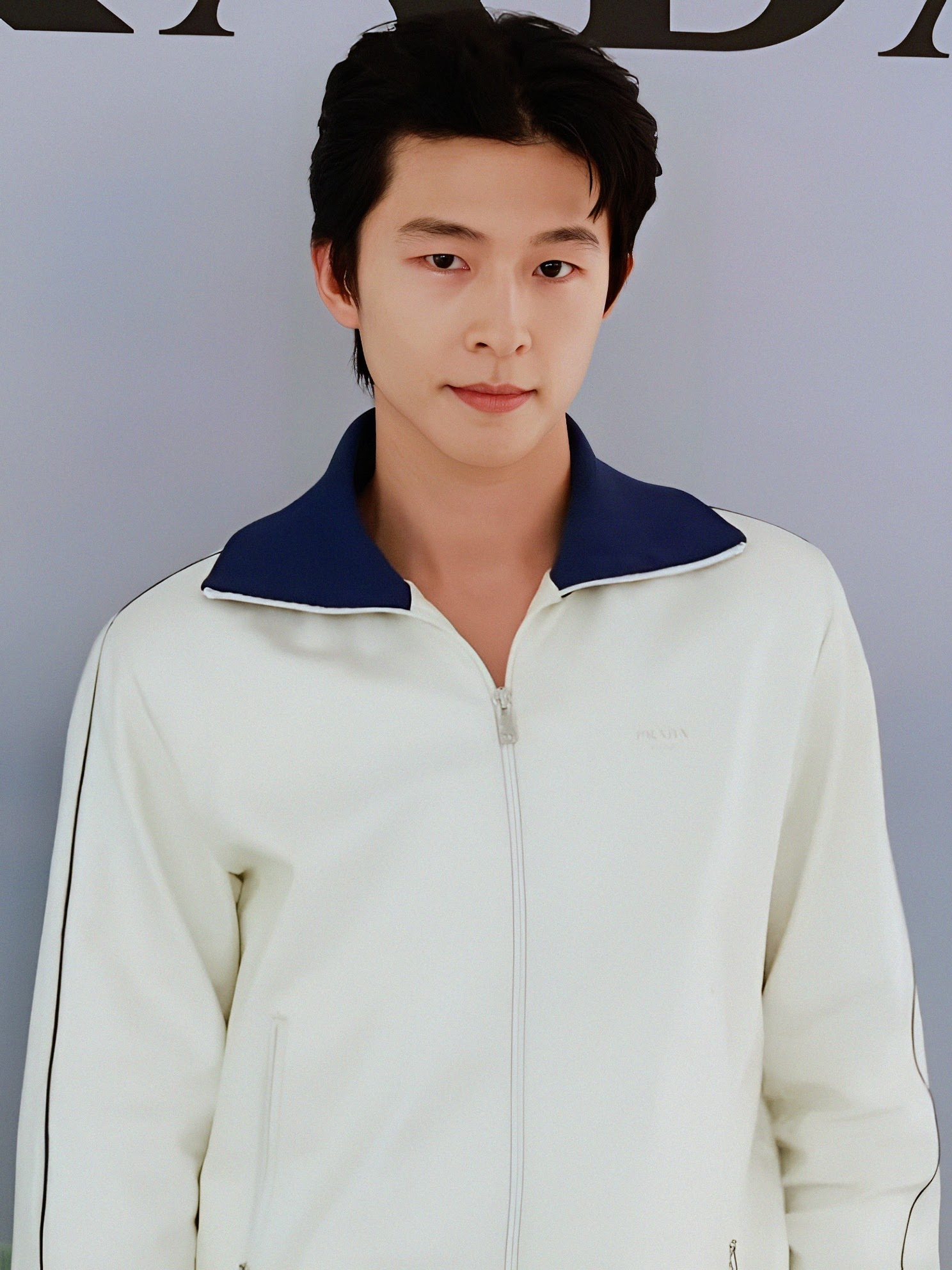
- Hong in 2025
- Born: February 14, 1996 (age 30); Seoul, South Korea
- Other name: Hong Gyeong
- Education: Hanyang University
- Occupation: Actor
- Years active: 2017–present
- Agent: Management MMM

Korean name
- Hangul: 홍경
- Hanja: 紅炅
- RR: Hong Gyeong
- MR: Hong Kyŏng

Hong Kyung (Korean: 홍경; born February 14, 1996) is a South Korean actor. He is best known for his roles in the films Innocence (2020) and Good News (2025), as well as the television series Weak Hero Class 1 (2022) and Revenant (2023).

== Career ==
After graduating from Hanyang University, Hong made his acting debut with a minor role in the television series Queen of Mystery (2017) and subsequently appeared in School 2017 (2017), While You Were Sleeping (2017), and Jugglers (2017–2018). He continued to act in television series such as My Lawyer, Mr. Jo 2: Crime and Punishment (2019), D.P. (2021), and Lovers of the Red Sky (2021).

Hong made his feature film debut in Innocence (2020), for which he received critical acclaim and won a Baeksang Arts Award for Best New Actor – Film.

In February 2022, Hong moved to Management MMM after his contract with J-Wide expired. The same year he starred in the drama Weak Hero Class 1 based on the popular Naver webtoon Weak Hero which gained him world-wide recognition. Besides acting in TV series, he also appeared in Taeyeon's "Can't Control Myself" music video. In 2023, he starred in the drama Revenant alongside Kim Tae-ri and Oh Jung-se.

== Filmography ==
=== Film ===
| Year | Title | Role | Notes | Ref. |
|---|---|---|---|---|
| 2020 | Innocence | Ahn Jung-soo | | |
| 2021 | A Distant Place | Hyun-min | | |
| 2021 | On the Line | Job seeker | Cameo | |
| 2022 | Motherland | Min-jae | Short film | |
| 2024 | Troll Factory | Paeptaek | | |
| 2024 | Hear Me: Our Summer | Lee Yong-jun | | |
| 2025 | Lost in Starlight | Jay | Voice | |
| 2025 | Good News | Seo Go-myung | | |
| 2025 | Concrete Market | Kim Tae-jin | | |

=== Television series ===
| Year | Title | Role | Notes | Ref. |
|---|---|---|---|---|
| 2017 | Queen of Mystery | Bully | | |
| 2017 | School 2017 | Won Byung-goo | | |
| 2017 | While You Were Sleeping | Choi Wook-hyun | Cameo (episodes 3, 6, 29, 31) | |
| 2017–2018 | Jugglers | Jwa Tae-yi | | |
| 2017–2018 | Rain or Shine | Choi Sung-jae | Cameo | |
| 2018 | Live | Yoo Man-yong | Cameo (episodes 9–11) | |
| 2018 | Life on Mars | Oh Young-soo (1988) | Cameo (episodes 10, 12) | |
| 2019 | My Lawyer, Mr. Jo 2: Crime and Punishment | Baek Seung-hoon | | |
| 2019 | Hotel del Luna | Baker | Cameo (episode 4) | |
| 2021 | D.P. | Ryu Yi-kang | Season 1 | |
| 2021 | Lovers of the Red Sky | Choi Jung | | |
| 2021 | The Effect of a Finger Flick on a Breakup | Koo Won-bin | KBS Drama Special – Season 12 | |
| 2022 | Weak Hero | Oh Beom-seok | Main role (Season 1); Guest (Season 2) | |
| 2023 | Revenant | Lee Hong-sae | | |
| 2025 | Concrete Market | Kim Tae-jin | | |

=== Web series ===
| Year | Title | Role | Notes | Ref. |
|---|---|---|---|---|
| 2017 | Brain, Your Choice of Romance | Tae-woo | | |

=== Music video appearances ===
| Year | Song Title | Artist | Ref. |
|---|---|---|---|
| 2022 | "Can't Control Myself" | Taeyeon | |
| 2023 | "Tomorrow" (내일의 우리) | Car, the Garden | |

== Awards and nominations ==
Name of the award ceremony, year presented, category, nominee of the award, and the result of the nomination
| Award ceremony | Year | Category | Nominated work | Result | Ref. |
|---|---|---|---|---|---|
| Baeksang Arts Awards | 2021 | Best New Actor – Film | Innocence | Won | |
| Baeksang Arts Awards | 2023 | Best New Actor – Television | Weak Hero Class 1 | Nominated | |
| Baeksang Arts Awards | 2026 | Best Actor – Film | Good News | Nominated | |
| Blue Dragon Film Awards | 2021 | Best New Actor | Innocence | Nominated | |
| Buil Film Awards | 2020 | Best New Actor | Innocence | Nominated | |
| Buil Film Awards | 2021 | Best New Actor | A Distant Place | Nominated | |
| Busan International Film Festival with Marie Claire Asia Star Awards | 2024 | Face of Asia Award | Hear Me: Our Summer | Won | |
| Chunsa Film Art Awards | 2021 | Best New Actor | Innocence | Nominated | |
| Director's Cut Awards | 2025 | Best New Actor in Film | Troll Factory | Nominated | |
| KBS Drama Awards | 2021 | Best New Actor | Drama Special: The Effect of a Finger Flick on a Breakup | Nominated | |
| Korea First Brand Awards | 2026 | Actor – Rising Star | Hong Kyung | Won | |
| SBS Drama Awards | 2023 | Excellence Award, Actor in a Miniseries Genre/Action Drama | Revenant | Won | |
| Wildflower Film Awards | 2022 | Best New Actor | A Distant Place | Nominated | |
