= The Deal (TV series) =

2023 South Korean television series

- Promotional poster
- Also known as: The Perfect Deal
- Hangul: 거래
- Hanja: 去來
- RR: Georae
- MR: Kŏrae
- Genre: Crime thriller; Mystery
- Based on: Deal by Woonam 20
- Developed by: Wavve Studios (planning)
- Written by: Hong Jong-sung
- Directed by: Lee Jung-gon
- Starring: Yoo Seung-ho; Yoo Su-bin; Kim Dong-hwi
- Music by: Lee Juno
- Country of origin: South Korea
- Original language: Korean
- No. of episodes: 8

Production
- Producers: Yoon Hyun-ki; Cho In-yo
- Cinematography: Kim Bo-ram
- Editor: Kim Woo-il
- Camera setup: Single-camera
- Running time: 40 minutes
- Production companies: Playlist Studio; Like M Company

Original release
- Network: Wavve
- Release: October 5 – October 27, 2023

The Deal (Korean: 거래) is a 2023 South Korean streaming television series starring Yoo Seung-ho, Yoo Su-bin, and Kim Dong-hwi. Based on the webtoon of the same name by Woonam 20, the series is about two young men who accidentally kidnap their friend.

It premiered at the On Screen section of the 28th Busan International Film Festival on October 5, 2023, where 3 of 8 episodes were screened. The series was the only Korean drama invited to the third edition of the Red Sea International Film Festival in Jeddah, Saudi Arabia, one of the most prestigious events in the world of cinema, where the first three episodes were screened. It is available for streaming from October 6, 2023, on Wavve in South Korea, Far EasTone friDay Video in Taiwan, Tonton in Malaysia and Viki in selected regions.

== Synopsis ==
The Deal tells the story of the three former high school classmates who get together. However, when Lee Jun-seong (Yoo Seung-ho) and Song Jae-hyo (Kim Dong-hwi) make the hasty decision to kidnap Park Min-woo (Yoo Su-bin), things take an unexpected turn, and the difficulties that follow send all three of them on a perilous and tumultuous journey.

== Cast ==
=== Main ===
- Yoo Seung-ho as Lee Jun-seong: a former rising high school soccer player who pledges a new life after being discharged from the military, and at the same time experiences intense emotional changes and anguish as he is caught up in an accidental kidnapping.
- Yoo Su-bin as Park Min-woo: the son of a rich family who looks innocent on the outside, but he is a person who thinks that he will not be a pushover inside. He then backproposes an unimaginable deal to escape the hostage of the kidnapping, creating a turning point for the case.
- Kim Dong-hwi as Song Jae-hyo: medical student and the mastermind of the kidnapping case who made the irreversible choice of trading friends in the play.
- Lee Joo-young as Cha Su-an: a police trainee who's been preparing to join the police force for seven years and the only witness of the kidnapping case after hearing a suspicious sounds from the neighbor's apartment in front of their house, she decides to investigate.

=== Supporting ===
- Baek Ji-won as Min-woo's mother: after her husband's sudden passing, Baek Ji-won took on the responsibility of running the company and saving her family. She fought hard and managed to keep the business afloat. But now, her son Min-woo has been kidnapped. She reaches out to President Hwang for help in rescuing him.
- Shim Young-eun as Chief Kim: he's the one who always accompanies Min-woo's mother.
- Jeong Yong-ju as Oh Cheol: Su-an's boyfriend and the son of the owner of the building where Jae-hyo lives.
- Woo Ji-hyun as Cha Jae-kyung: Su-an's older brother, who is working as a homicide detective.
- Kim Do-yoon as Cho Yong-ho: he is a member of a criminal organization and acts as their problem solver. He is currently tailing Governor Hwang.
- Jeong In-gyeom as Governor Hwang
- Lee Sung-wook as Voyager: Min-woo's mom right-hand man.

== Production ==
On March 28, 2022, Playlist announced that it will release 13 episodes in coming years including original dramas based on Naver webtoons and web novels, and music content. Deal, a story about two young men who accidentally kidnap their friend, was included in the lineup.

Lee Joo-young was added to cast in October 2022 to play a police officer.

Filming began on December 29, 2022, and ended in April 2023.

== Release ==
The series had its premium at the 28th Busan International Film Festival in On Screen section on October 5, 2023. It is available for streaming from October 6 on Wavve with two episodes released on every Friday.
