= Han Jun-hee =

South Korean filmmaker (born 1985)

- Han at the 2026 Busan International Film Festival
- Born: 1985 (age 40–41); South Korea
- Occupations: Film director, screenwriter
- Years active: 2005-present

Korean name
- Hangul: 한준희
- RR: Han Junhui
- MR: Han Chunhŭi

Han Jun-hee (Korean: 한준희; born 1985) is a South Korean film director and screenwriter. Han wrote and directed the neo-noir crime thriller Coin Locker Girl (2015).

== Filmography ==
=== Film ===
Year	Title	Credited as			Notes
Year	Title	Director	Writer	Producer	Notes
2005	To Bite a Cigarette	Yes	Yes	No	Short film
2013	Understanding Movies	Yes	Yes	No	
2013	The Gifted Hands	No	Yes	No	
2015	Coin Locker Girl	Yes	Yes	No	
2019	Hit-and-Run Squad	Yes	Yes	No	
2024	Pilot	No	Adaptation	No	

=== Television ===
Year	Title	Credited as			Notes
Year	Title	Director	Writer	Producer	Notes
2021–2023	D.P.	Yes	Yes	No	
2022	Weak Hero Class 1	No	No	No	As creative director
2025	Tastefully Yours	No	No	No	As creative director
2026	The Blue Road	Yes	No	No	Netflix
2026	Dead-End Job	Yes	No	Yes	As creator and executive producer

== Awards ==
- 2016 52nd Baeksang Arts Awards: Best New Director (Film) for Coin Locker Girl

=== Honours ===
- Jury member at the 2023 Busan International Film Festival for its main competition section 'New Currents Award'.
