= Yoo Su-bin =

South Korean actor (born 1992)

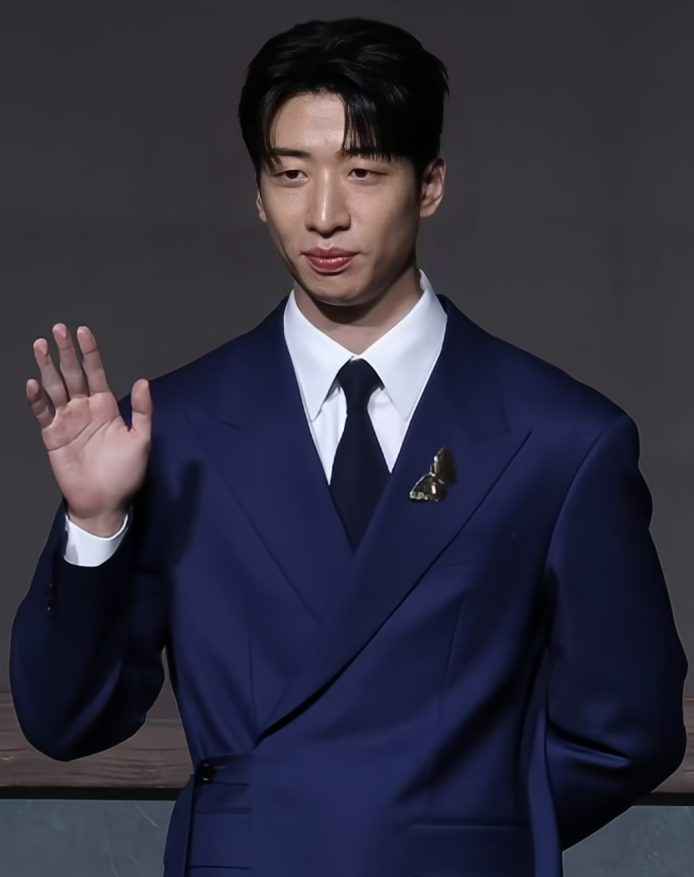
- Yoo in 2026
- Born: November 6, 1992 (age 33); Bucheon, Gyeonggi-do, South Korea
- Occupation: Actor
- Agent: J-Wide Company

Korean name
- Hangul: 유수빈
- RR: Yu Subin
- MR: Yu Subin

Yoo Su-bin (Korean: 유수빈; born November 6, 1992) is a South Korean actor. He is primarily known for his role as Choi Hyo-Man in Weak Hero Class 2.

== Career ==
Yoo made his drama debut in Prison Playbook in 2017, as Yang Jung-suk, who was involved in the back story of Jung Hae-in's character Yoo Jeong-woo.

In 2019, he had a major supporting role in the short film The Present. However, it was his role as a North Korean soldier obsessed with South Korean dramas in the drama Crash Landing on You that made a surprising impact. Besides his amusing characterization, he also received strong praise from North Korean defectors who were impressed with his accent.

== Personal life ==
Yoo is the younger brother of director Yoo Soo-min, who directed Weak Hero Class 1, and Yoo also made a cameo appearance for his older brother.

== Filmography ==
=== Film ===
Year	Title	Role	Notes/Ref.
2016	Curtain Call	Police	
2017	The Chase	Gangster 1	
2017	Along with the Gods: The Two Worlds	Guard Post soldier 2	
2019	Exit	Yong-soo	
2019	The Present	Yoo Yeong-bok	
2019	Unalterable	Sin Ha-jin (young)	
2022	Boys		Premiere at BIFF

=== Television series ===
Year	Title	Role	Notes	Ref.
2017	Prison Playbook	Yang Jung-suk		
2018	Live	Ha Do-Sik		
2018	Goodbye to Goodbye	Woo Nam-sik		
2018	The Ghost Detective	Kang Eun-jung		
2019	Legal High	Kim Byeong-tae		
2019	Special Labor Inspector	Baek Won-Man		
2019	KBS Drama Special	Song Hyeon-tae	Episode: "Wreck Car"	
2019–2020	Crash Landing on You	Kim Ju-meok		
2020	Start-Up	Lee Cheol-san		
2020	KBS Drama Special	Kim Joo-mook	Episode: "The Reason Why I Can't Tell You"	
2021	Lost	Soo-joo		
2022	Big Mouth	Park Chang-ho and Go Mi-ho's neighbor	Cameo (episode 2)	
2022–2025	Weak Hero	Choi Hyo-man	Season 1 (special appearance); Season 2 (main cast)	
2023	D.P.	Park Se-woong	Season 2	
2023	The Deal	Park Min-woo		
2025	Tastefully Yours	Shin Choon-seung		
2025	Concrete Market	Park Cheol-min		
2026	Perfect Crown	Choi Hyun		

=== Web series ===
Year	Title	Role	Notes	Ref.
2021	Blue Birthday	Senior at Seoyeon High School	Cameo as Episode: "Lively Ordinary Days"	

=== Television show ===
Year	Title	Role	Notes	Ref.
2021–2022	Master in the House	Cast Member	Episode 180–215	
