= Concrete Market =

2025 South Korean television series

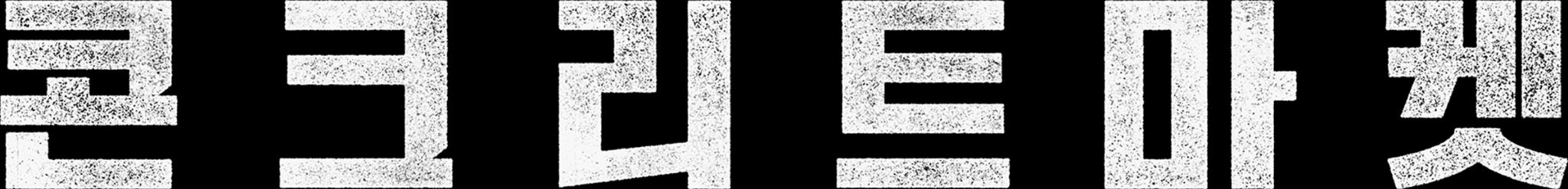
- Hangul: 콘크리트 마켓
- RR: Konkeuriteu maket
- MR: K'onk'ŭrit'ŭ mak'et
- Genre: Post-apocalyptic; Disaster; Thriller
- Written by: Kwak Jae-min
- Directed by: Hong Ki-won
- Starring: Lee Jae-in; Hong Kyung; Jung Man-sik; Yoo Su-bin
- Country of origin: South Korea
- Original language: Korean
- No. of episodes: 7

Production
- Running time: 27–32 minutes
- Production companies: Climax Studio; Andmarq

Original release
- Network: Wavve
- Release: December 23 – December 30, 2025

Related
- Concrete Utopia (film); Badland Hunters (film)

Concrete Market (Korean: 콘크리트 마켓) is a 2025 South Korean post-apocalyptic disaster thriller television series written by Kwak Jae-min, directed by Hong Ki-won, and starring Lee Jae-in, Hong Kyung, Jung Man-sik, and Yoo Su-bin. The series depicts a post-earthquake dystopian world where a surviving apartment becomes a marketplace. It premiered on Wavve on December 23, 2025. A film version was first premiered on December 3, screened in a limited number.

The series is part of the "Concrete Universe", a shared dystopian world including films like Concrete Utopia (2023) and Badland Hunters (2024).

== Synopsis ==
After a massive earthquake, the only remaining apartment complex becomes home to Hwanggung Market, a bartering hub where survivors trade goods and assert power in unpredictable ways.

== Cast and characters ==
=== Main ===
- Lee Jae-in as Choi Hee-ro

A mysterious strategist whose sudden arrival disrupts the existing order of the market.

- Hong Kyung as Kim Tae-jin

A loyal aide to Sang-yong who becomes a key figure in orchestrating a new order within the Hwanggung Market.

- Jung Man-sik as Park Sang-yong

The absolute ruler of the market, whose authority dominates the residents.

- Yoo Su-bin as Park Cheol-min

Tae-jin's rival and Sang-yong's right-hand man.

=== Supporting ===
- Kim Gook-hee as Mi-seon

A resident involved in the market's complex dynamics.

- Choi Jung-un as Se-hee

The person who Hee-ro strives to protect.

- Song Ji-in as So-jeong

Hee-ro's ally.

== Production ==
=== Development ===
Concrete Market was developed in October 2021 as a drama. Produced by Climax Studio and Andmarq, directed by Hong Ki-won, who helmed the short film Tylenol (2015), and written by Kwak Jae-min, who wrote Amanza (2020), Bargain (2022), and Badland Hunters (2024). Due to COVID-19 pandemic, the release was delayed and lead to the material being edited into a 122-minute theatrical film, which premiered first, distributed by Lotte Entertainment. This allowed audiences to experience the narrative in a condensed cinematic form before the series' full OTT release. After the film's release, the series was reinstated in its original episodic format for OTT distribution. The expanded version, described as a "complete edition original series", includes more detailed character arcs and world‑building than what audiences saw in the theatrical cut.

=== Casting ===
In October 2021, Hong Kyung and Lee Jae-in were reportedly cast as lead for the series. The next month, it was confirmed that Lee, Hong, Jung Man-sik, Kim Gook-hee, Choi Jung-un, Yoo Su-bin, and Song Ji-in have confirmed their appearances.

=== Filming ===
Principal photography began on November 14, 2021.

== Release ==
In March 2024, it was reported that the series was supposed to be released on Paramount+ in the second half of 2024.

Concrete Market was first premiered its film version on December 3, 2025, in a limited number of 170-180 screens, word-of-mouth is steadily increasing its audience. The original seven-episode series is scheduled to be released on Wavve on December 23.
