= Coin Locker Girl =

- Theatrical release poster
- Hangul: 차이나타운
- Lit.: Chinatown
- RR: Chainataun
- MR: Ch'ainat'aun
- Directed by: Han Jun-hee
- Written by: Han Jun-hee
- Produced by: Ahn Eun-mi; Cho Dong-ki
- Starring: Kim Hye-soo; Kim Go-eun
- Cinematography: Lee Chang-jae
- Edited by: Shin Min-kyung
- Music by: Jang Young-gyu; Kim Sun
- Production company: Pollux Pictures
- Distributed by: CGV Arthouse
- Release date: April 29, 2015
- Running time: 110 minutes
- Country: South Korea
- Language: Korean
- Box office: US$10.7 million

Coin Locker Girl (Korean: 차이나타운; RR: Chainataun; lit. 'Chinatown') is a 2015 South Korean crime thriller film written and directed by Han Jun-hee, starring Kim Hye-soo and Kim Go-eun. It was selected to screen in the Critics' Week section of the 2015 Cannes Film Festival.

== Plot ==
A baby is found abandoned inside a coin locker at Western Seoul train station in 1996. A beggar takes her and names her Il-young, then when she turns 10, she is taken by the corrupt detective who sells her off to a woman referred to simply as Mother as part of his loan payment. Mother is the boss of a loan shark and organ trafficking crime ring in Incheon Chinatown; she has held on to her position of power by being dispassionate and calculating, and by keeping by her side only those of use to her. Mother decides to raise the young child after she shows toughness and smarts, eventually grooming her for a position in her organization as her personal debt collector.

One day, Il-young is given a task to collect debt from Suk-hyun, the son of a debtor. Over the course of a few days, she is initially taken aback by the guy, who doesn't seem afraid of her and even shows her kindness and openness when talking about his own struggles, before starting to develop feelings for him. But when his father flees from the debt, Mother orders her to kill Suk-hyun, an order Il-young fails to follow. Regardless, Suk-hyun is killed and organ-harvested by Mother's other goons. Il-young is beaten down and readied to be shipped for Japanese flesh trade. The only family she has ever known comes crashing down. Il-young escapes and makes her way back to Mother, and kills her, only to find out that she is actually her birth mother and that her mother uses this opportunity to teach her a lesson and train and prepare her for taking over.

== Cast ==
- Kim Hye-soo as Ma Woo-hee / Mother
- Kim Go-eun as Ma Il-young
  - Kim Su-an as young Il-young
- Uhm Tae-goo as Woo Gon
  - Wi Ha-joon as young Woo-gon
- Park Bo-gum as Park Seok-hyun
- Go Kyung-pyo as Chi-do
- Lee Soo-kyung as Ssong
  - Park Ji-bo as young Ssong
- Cho Hyun-chul as Hong-joo
  - So Sang-seop as young Hong-joo
- Lee Dae-yeon as Dr. Ahn
- Cho Soo-hyang as Leukemia child's mother
- Jo Bok-rae as Detective Tak
- Jung Suk-yong as Mr. Woo
- Baek Soo-jang as Number 2
- Lee Jang-won as Chubby
- Oh Dae-hwan as Bruiser
- Lee Sang-hee as Bruiser's wife
- Ki Guk-seo as Man in uniform
- Gi Ju-bong as Man in suit
- Ahn Jae-hong as Police officer 2

== Awards and nominations ==
Year	Award	Category	Recipient	Result	Ref.
2015	68th Cannes Film Festival	Caméra d'Or	Han Jun-hee	Nominated	
2015	19th Bucheon International Fantastic Film Festival	Jury's Choice for Feature Film	Coin Locker Girl	Won	
2015	45th Giffoni Film Festival	Gryphon Award for Best Film (Generator 18+ section)	Coin Locker Girl	Won	
2015	45th Giffoni Film Festival	British Film Institute Certificate	Coin Locker Girl	Won	
2015	35th Golden Cinema Festival	Best Actress	Kim Hye-soo	Won	
2015	2nd Korean Film Producers Association Awards	Best Actress	Kim Hye-soo	Won	
2015	24th Buil Film Awards	Best Actress	Kim Hye-soo	Nominated	
2015	24th Buil Film Awards	Best Actress	Kim Go-eun	Nominated	
2015	24th Buil Film Awards	Best Supporting Actor	Uhm Tae-goo	Nominated	
2015	24th Buil Film Awards	Best New Director	Han Jun-hee	Nominated	
2015	35th Korean Association of Film Critics Awards	Best Actress	Kim Hye-soo	Won	
2015	35th Korean Association of Film Critics Awards	Best New Director	Han Jun-hee	Nominated	
2015	35th Korean Association of Film Critics Awards	Top 10 Films of the Year	Coin Locker Girl	Won	
2015	52nd Grand Bell Awards	Best Actress	Kim Hye-soo	Nominated	
2015	52nd Grand Bell Awards	Best New Director	Han Jun-hee	Nominated	
2015	36th Blue Dragon Film Awards	Best Actress	Kim Hye-soo	Nominated	
2015	36th Blue Dragon Film Awards	Best New Director	Han Jun-hee	Nominated	
2015	36th Blue Dragon Film Awards	Best Art Direction	Lee Mok-won	Nominated	
2016	11th Max Movie Awards	Best Actress	Kim Hye-soo	Nominated	
2016	10th Asian Film Awards	Best Actress	Kim Hye-soo	Nominated	
2016	52nd Baeksang Arts Awards	Best Actress	Kim Hye-soo	Nominated	
2016	52nd Baeksang Arts Awards	Best Supporting Actor	Uhm Tae-goo	Nominated	
2016	52nd Baeksang Arts Awards	Best New Actor	Go Kyung-pyo	Nominated	
2016	52nd Baeksang Arts Awards	Best New Actor	Park Bo-gum	Nominated	
2016	52nd Baeksang Arts Awards	Best New Director	Han Jun-hee	Won	
2016	21st Chunsa Film Art Awards	Best Actress	Kim Hye-soo	Won	
