= Wavve =

South Korean online streaming platform

- Native name: 웨이브
- Website type: OTT platform
- Founded: September 18, 2019; 7 years ago
- Area served: South Korea
- Owners: SK Square (40.5%); Korean Broadcasting System (19.8%); Munhwa Broadcasting Corporation (19.8%); Seoul Broadcasting System (19.8%)
- Key people: Shim Sang-won (CEO)
- Website: Wavve.com

Wavve (Korean: 웨이브) is a South Korean subscription video on-demand, over-the-top, streaming television service operated by SK Telecom. Wavve distributes television series, specials, variety shows, films, documentaries, animations, and sports.

In June 2025, South Korea's Fair Trade Commission conditionally approved the merger of Wavve and TVING and required the two platforms to maintain existing subscription fee levels until the end of 2026.

== Original programming ==
=== Drama ===
- SF8 (Note: SF8 is a television film work between MBC, the Directors Guild of Korea, Wavve, and the production company Soo Film.) (2020)
- Love Scene Number (2021)
- You Raise Me Up (2021)
- Political Fever (2021)
- Tracer (2022)
- Desperate Mr.X (2022)
- Seasons of Blossom (2022)
- Weak Hero Class 1 (2022)
- Bitch x Rich (2023–2025)
- One Day Off (2023)
- The Deal (2023)
- The Chairman Is Level 9 (2024)
- High School Return of a Gangster (2024)
- History of Scruffiness (2025)
- One: High School Heroes (2025)
- S Line (2025)
- No Mercy (2025)
- Love.exe (2025)
- Concrete Market (2025)
- Reverse (2026)
- Francesca Next Door (2026)

=== Variety show ===
- NCT Life in Osaka (2017)
- Level Up Project! (2017–2020)
- Exo's Travel the World on a Ladder (2018–2019)
- Boys Mental Training Camp (2020)
- MTopia (2020)
- About Time (2020–2021)
- Reversal of Highlight (2021)
- Golf Battle: Birdie Buddies (2021–present)
- THE Boyz's Time Out (2021)
- Game of Blood (2021–2023)
- His Man (2022–present)
- Bad Papa: Evil Files (2023)
- National Crime Agent (2023)
- The Community (2024)
