= 16th Korea Drama Awards =

2025 edition of award ceremony

- Official poster
- Awarded by: Korea Drama Festival Organizing Committee; Ministry of Culture, Sports and Tourism; South Gyeongsang Province; Jinju
- Date: October 11, 2025
- Site: Gyeongnam Culture and Arts Center, Grand Performance Hall, Jinju, South Gyeongsang Province, South Korea
- Official website: Korea Drama Awards

Television coverage
- Network: Seokyeong Broadcasting; Korea Drama Festival YouTube channel

The 16th iteration of the Korea Drama Awards is an awards ceremony for excellence in television in South Korea. It was held on October 11, 2025, as an event of the Korea Drama Festival at Gyeongnam Culture and Arts Center, Grand Performance Hall, Jinju.

== Nominations and winners ==
The nominations were announced on August 27, 2025, for the dramas of all genres airing domestically from October 2024 to September 2025.

Grand Prize (Daesang)	Best Drama
Ahn Jae-wook – For Eagle Brothers	Our Movie; Doubt; When Life Gives You Tangerines; Resident Playbook; The Tale of Lady Ok; Our Unwritten Seoul; Good Boy; The Haunted Palace; Love Scout; Tastefully Yours; Buried Hearts; When the Phone Rings
Top Excellence Award, Actor	Top Excellence Award, Actress
Yook Sung-jae – The Haunted Palace; Kang Ha-neul – Squid Game 2 / Squid Game 3 / Tastefully Yours; Park Bo-gum – When Life Gives You Tangerines / Good Boy; Park Hyung-sik – Buried Hearts / Twelve; Ahn Jae-wook – For Eagle Brothers; Yoo Yeon-seok – When the Phone Rings	Park Bo-young – Our Unwritten Seoul; Lee Se-young – What Comes After Love / Motel California; IU – When Life Gives You Tangerines; Lim Ji-yeon – The Tale of Lady Ok; Chae Soo-bin – When the Phone Rings; Han Ji-min – Heavenly Ever After / Love Scout
Excellence Award, Actor	Excellence Award, Actress
Lee Hyun-wook – Shark: The Storm / The Queen Who Crowns; Park Jin-young – The Witch / Our Unwritten Seoul; Lee Jun-young – Melo Movie / When Life Gives You Tangerines / Weak Hero Class 2 / Pump Up the Healthy Love; Park Ji-hoon – Weak Hero Class 2; Jung Joon-won – Resident Playbook; Choi Woo-shik – Melo Movie	Kim Ji-yeon – The Haunted Palace; Kim So-hyun – Good Boy; Go Youn-jung – Resident Playbook; Lee Hye-ri – Friendly Rivalry; Cha Joo-young – The Queen Who Crowns; Han Ji-eun – When the Stars Gossip / Study Group
Best New Actor	Best New Actress
Choo Young-woo – The Tale of Lady Ok / Head over Heels; Heo Nam-joon – When the Phone Rings / When the Stars Gossip; Kang Yoo-seok – Resident Playbook / When Life Gives You Tangerines / Law and the City; Kim Min-kyu – Bitch x Rich; Ryeoun – Namib / History of Scruffiness / Weak Hero Class 2; Bae Na-ra – Weak Hero Class 2 / Tastefully Yours	Chung Su-bin – Friendly Rivalry; Hong Hwa-yeon – Buried Hearts / Tastefully Yours / I Am a Running Mate; Kim Eun-bi – Our Movie; Roh Jeong-eui – The Witch / Crushology 101; Shin Si-a – Resident Playbook; Chae Won-bin – Doubt
Hot Star Award (Male)	Hot Star Award (Female)
Byeon Woo-seok	Chung Su-bin
Best Couple	Global Star Award
Lee Hye-ri and Chung Su-bin - Friendly Rivalry	Byeon Woo-seok
Best OST Award	Multi-tainer Award
Young Tak – “Unpredictable Life” for For Eagle Brothers	Park Jae-chan
Lifetime Achievement Award	Villain Award
Kim Yong-rim	Oh Jung-se - Good Boy
Scene Stealer Award (Female)
Lee Ho-jung
