= D.P. (TV series) =

2021 South Korean television series

- Promotional poster for season 2
- Also known as: Deserter Pursuit
- Hangul: 디피
- RR: Dipi
- MR: Tip'i
- Genre: Military drama; Action
- Based on: D.P Dog's Day by Kim Bo-tong
- Screenplay by: Kim Bo-tong; Han Jun-hee
- Directed by: Han Jun-hee
- Starring: Jung Hae-in; Koo Kyo-hwan; Kim Sung-kyun; Son Suk-ku
- Music by: Primary
- Opening theme: "Crazy" by Kevin Oh
- Country of origin: South Korea
- Original language: Korean
- No. of seasons: 2
- No. of episodes: 12

Production
- Executive producers: Byun Seung-min; Han Jun-hee
- Producer: Kim Dong-min
- Cinematography: Yoo Ji-sun
- Editor: Park Min-sun
- Running time: 41–64 minutes
- Production companies: Climax Studio; Shotcake

Original release
- Network: Netflix
- Release: August 27, 2021 – July 28, 2023

D.P. (Korean: 디피; an acronym for Deserter Pursuit) is a South Korean military action television series for Netflix. Directed by Han Jun-hee, from a screenplay by Kim Bo-tong and Han, based on the Lezhin webtoon D.P Dog's Day by Kim, and starring Jung Hae-in, Koo Kyo-hwan, Kim Sung-kyun, and Son Suk-ku. The first season was released on August 27, 2021, and the second season was released on July 28, 2023.

== Synopsis ==
=== Season 1 ===
Set in 2014, D.P. tells the story of a team of Korean military police with their mission to catch deserters.

The series magnifies the undesirable nature of the military, especially within a South Korean context. The widespread bullying and hazing as well as the mindset for the "survival of the fittest" are rife, with those presumed the "weakest" thrown to the bottom of the pile and served horrifying experiences at the hands of their superiors and compatriots.

Private Ahn Jun-ho and Corporal Han Ho-yeol team up to find the deserters, and they end up on an adventurous journey.

=== Season 2 ===
Season 2 is a direct continuation of Season 1. Like the first season, Season 2 magnifies the undesirable nature of the South Korean military, but it is mostly done through the perspective of senior officers while covering topics such as corruption, LGBTQ+ discrimination, and the question of whether the military as an organization is responsible for soldiers who act out violently due to abuse by their fellow soldiers.

== Cast ==
=== Character appearances ===
Character	Portrayed by	Season	
Character	Portrayed by	1	2
Main
Private Ahn Jun-ho	Jung Hae-in	Main	Main
Corporal Han Ho-yeol	Koo Kyo-hwan	Main	Main
Sergeant First Class Park Beom-gu	Kim Sung-kyun	Main	Main
Captain Im Ji-sup	Son Suk-ku	Main	Main
Warrant Officer Oh Min-woo	Jung Seok-yong		Main
Lieutenant Colonel Seo-eun	Kim Ji-hyun		Main
Brigadier General Gu Ja-woon	Ji Jin-hee		Main
Supporting
Corporal Park Sung-woo	Go Kyung-pyo	Guest	Recurring
Shin Hye-yeon	Lee Seol	Guest	Recurring
Jo Suk-bong	Cho Hyun-chul	Recurring	—N/a
Hwang Jang-soo	Shin Seung-ho	Recurring	—N/a
Heo Ki-young	Park Se-joon	Recurring	—N/a
Shin Woo-suk	Park Jung-woo	Recurring	—N/a
Choi Joon-mok	Kim Dong-young	Recurring	—N/a
Jung Hyun-min	Lee Jun-young	Recurring	—N/a
Heo Chi-do	Choi Joon-young	Recurring	—N/a
Kim Roo-ri	Moon Sang-hoon	Recurring	Recurring
Chun Yong-duk	Hyun Bong-sik	Recurring	—N/a
Ryu Yi-kang	Hong Kyung	Recurring	—N/a
Kim Kyu	Bae Yoo-ram	Recurring	—N/a
Jun-mok's mother	Oh Min-ae	Recurring	—N/a
Lee Jae-chang	Song Duk-ho	Recurring	—N/a
Tae Sung-gon	Han Woo-yul	Recurring	—N/a
Ahn Soo-jin	Lee Yeon	Recurring	—N/a
Lee Hyo-sang	Joo Jong-hyuk	Recurring	—N/a
Shin Ah-hui	Choi Hyun-wook	—N/a	Recurring
Park Se-woong	Yoo Su-bin	—N/a	Recurring
Jang Seong-min	Bae Na-ra	—N/a	Recurring
Sergeant Na Joong-seok	Lim Seong-jae	—N/a	Recurring

=== Guest ===
- Kwon Hae-hyo as Ahn Joon-ho's father (Eps. 1, 3-4, 11)
- Lee Joong-ok as an hanjeungmak employee (Ep. 2)
- Won Ji-an as Moon Young-ok (Eps. 3, 9)
- Choi Hee-jin as Girl in pink jacket (Ep. 12)

== Episodes ==
Series overview
Season	Episodes	Originally released
1	6	August 27, 2021
2	6	July 28, 2023

=== Season 1 (2021) ===
No. overall	No. in season	Title	Directed by	Written by	Original release date
1	1	"A Man Holding Flowers"	Han Jun-hee	Kim Bo-tong & Han Jun-hee	August 27, 2021
2	2	"Daydream"	Han Jun-hee	Kim Bo-tong & Han Jun-hee	August 27, 2021
3	3	"That Woman"	Han Jun-hee	Kim Bo-tong & Han Jun-hee	August 27, 2021
4	4	"The Monty Hall Problem"	Han Jun-hee	Kim Bo-tong & Han Jun-hee	August 27, 2021
5	5	"Military Dog"	Han Jun-hee	Kim Bo-tong & Han Jun-hee	August 27, 2021
6	6	"Onlookers"	Han Jun-hee	Kim Bo-tong & Han Jun-hee	August 27, 2021

=== Season 2 (2023) ===
No. overall	No. in season	Title	Directed by	Written by	Original release date
7	1	"The Rains"	Han Jun-hee	Kim Bo-tong & Han Jun-hee	July 28, 2023
8	2	"Dirty Play"	Han Jun-hee	Kim Bo-tong & Han Jun-hee	July 28, 2023
9	3	"Curtain Call"	Han Jun-hee	Kim Bo-tong & Han Jun-hee	July 28, 2023
10	4	"The Charred Remains"	Han Jun-hee	Kim Bo-tong & Han Jun-hee	July 28, 2023
11	5	"An Jun-ho"	Han Jun-hee	Kim Bo-tong & Han Jun-hee	July 28, 2023
12	6	"The Day"	Han Jun-hee	Kim Bo-tong & Han Jun-hee	July 28, 2023

== Production ==
=== Development ===
In late June 2020, Lezhin Entertainment officially announced that Lezhin Studio and Homemade Film would co-produce a 6-part adaptation of the hit webtoon D.P: Dog Days by Kim Bo-tong, to be released exclusively through Netflix. The story is based on Kim's own experience during his mandatory military service.

Director and co-writer Han Jun-hee had wanted to work on the webtoon's adaptation "for five or six years [before he] finally got a chance" to do so. Though Ahn Joon-ho is a Corporal in the webtoon, Han wanted him to be a Private in the series so people could "resonate with the story and consider Joon-ho as a friend who just started his military service."

On September 1, 2021, Jung Hae-in revealed during an interview that he is "looking forward to season 2, and the director and writer are already writing the script." On May 31, 2022, Netflix officially announced the production of the season 2 with all four main cast reprising their roles.

On December 14, 2021, a second season was confirmed.

=== Casting ===
On September 3, 2020, Jung Hae-in, Koo Kyo-hwan, Kim Sung-kyun and Son Suk-ku were confirmed to star in the series. Koo's character does not appear in the webtoon, which he found "hard but exciting to portray a character exclusive to the series." To prepare for his role, Koo received help from his road manager who was part of the D.P. team during his military service. As for Jung, he practiced boxing for three months before filming began, in order to do his own action scenes.

Kim Bo-tong, who wrote the webtoon and co-wrote the series, commented that he "never dreamed of such a cast. They fit so perfectly into their roles that it seems like the roles were written for them."

=== Filming ===
Principal photography began in the summer of 2020.

== Reception ==
=== Critical response ===
==== Season 1 ====
On the review aggregator website Rotten Tomatoes, 100% of 5 critics' reviews are positive, with an average rating of 8.8/10.

William Schwartz of HanCinema praised Jung Hae-in's acting, commenting that he "is sublime here, in a brooding cinematic role radically different from the romances he's better known for." He added that "D.P. is worth watching, not just by people curious what South Korean mandatory military service is really like, but anyone from any country who's seriously thinking about joining up."

Pierce Conran of the South China Morning Post gave the series a 4.5/5 rating, noting that "D.P. hits home with a story that spans the past and present, as it acknowledges that yesterday's problems can still be today's." He also praised the cinematography as well as Jung and Koo's "electric chemistry".

Greg Wheeler of The Review Geek rated the series 4.3/5, noting that "D.P. is a stunning Korean drama [which] takes an unflinching look at bullying, the effect it has on mental health and larger societal questions about the mandatory military service in Korea" and praising the series for its "impressive" cinematography and for the way it "explore[s] a very sensitive and prevalent topic in a raw, artistic and unflinching way."

In a mixed review, Hidzir Junaini of NME gave the series a 3/5 rating, commenting that "Kim Bo-tong and Han Jun-hee must be given credit for how this series tackles such extraordinarily difficult and tragic subject matter with compassion and sensitivity", and praising the "uniformly excellent performances, splendid cinematography, addictive pacing, and intrepid commitment to shedding light on the appalling culture of bullying in the military", but criticizing the "weak characterization [of the] three main leads" as well as the "ludicrous escalation of events during its climax, which suddenly turns a fairly grounded show into a melodramatic action thriller."

==== Season 2 ====
On the review aggregator website Rotten Tomatoes, 100% of 6 critics' reviews are positive, with an average rating of 7.9/10.

=== Viewership ===
Following its release, the series topped Netflix's Top 10 in South Korea.

== Accolades ==
=== Awards and nominations ===
Name of the award ceremony, year presented, category, nominee of the award, and the result of the nomination
Award ceremony	Year	Category	Nominee / Work	Result	Ref.
APAN Star Awards	2022	Best Director	Han Jun-hee	Nominated	
APAN Star Awards	2022	Top Excellence Award, Actor in an OTT Drama	Jung Hae-in	Won	
APAN Star Awards	2022	Excellence Award, Actor in an OTT Drama	Koo Kyo-hwan	Nominated	
Asian Academy Creative Awards	2022	Best Actor in a leading role	Jung Hae-in	Won	
Baeksang Arts Awards	2022	Best Drama	D.P.	Won	
Baeksang Arts Awards	2022	Best Director – Television	Han Jun-hee	Nominated	
Baeksang Arts Awards	2022	Best Actor – Television	Jung Hae-in	Nominated	
Baeksang Arts Awards	2022	Best Supporting Actor – Television	Cho Hyun-chul	Won	
Baeksang Arts Awards	2022	Best New Actor – Television	Koo Kyo-hwan	Won	
Baeksang Arts Awards	2022	Best New Actor – Television	Shin Seung-ho	Nominated	
Blue Dragon Series Awards	2022	Best Drama	D.P.	Won	
Blue Dragon Series Awards	2022	Best Actor	Jung Hae-in	Nominated	
Blue Dragon Series Awards	2022	Best Supporting Actor	Son Suk-ku	Nominated	
Blue Dragon Series Awards	2022	Best New Actor	Koo Kyo-hwan	Won	
Director's Cut Awards	2022	Best Actor (TV)	Jung Hae-in	Nominated	
Director's Cut Awards	2022	Best Actor (TV)	Koo Kyo-hwan	Won	
Director's Cut Awards	2022	Best Director (TV)	Han Jun-hee	Nominated	
Director's Cut Awards	2022	Best Screenplay (TV)	Kim Bo-tong; Han Jun-hee	Nominated	
Director's Cut Awards	2022	Best New Actor (TV)	Koo Kyo-hwan	Nominated	
Director's Cut Awards	2022	Best New Actor (TV)	Cho Hyun-chul	Won	
Director's Cut Awards	2022	Best New Actress (TV)	Won Ji-an	Nominated	
Korea Drama Awards	2023	Excellence Award, Actor	Kim Sung-kyun	Won	

=== Listicle ===
Publisher	Year	Listicle	Placement	Ref.
Time	2023	The 10 Best Korean Dramas of 2023 on Netflix	Included	
Entertainment Weekly	2025	The 21 best Korean shows on Netflix to watch now	Top 21	
