= The Imperial Doctress =

- Genre: Historical fiction Medical; Romance
- Written by: Zhang Wei
- Directed by: Lee Kwok Lap
- Starring: Cecilia Liu; Wallace Huo; Huang Xuan
- Opening theme: Heavy Rain is Coming by Lala Hsu
- Ending theme: Until That Day by Sara Liu
- Country of origin: China
- Original language: Mandarin
- No. of seasons: 1
- No. of episodes: 50

Production
- Producer: Karen Tsoi
- Production location: China
- Running time: 42 minutes
- Production companies: New Classics Media; Tangren Media

Original release
- Network: JSTV, Dragon TV
- Release: 13 February – 9 March 2016

The Imperial Doctress (Chinese: 女医·明妃传) is a 2016 Chinese television series based on the story of Tan Yunxian, a female physician during the Ming dynasty in China. It stars Cecilia Liu as the titular character. The series aired every day at 7.30pm on Jiangsu TV and Dragon TV, from 13 February to 9 March 2016.

== Synopsis ==
Set in the Ming Dynasty during the rule of Emperor Yingzong, Tan Yunxian (Cecilia Liu) came from a long line of medicine practitioners, her family having served as court physicians for several generations. However, the practice for female physicians came to a halt when many were framed for abusing the form. Yet, Yunxian was determined to learn medicine and she did so in secrecy. Through her enthusiasm and persistence, Yunxian overcame many difficulties and rose through the ranks to become the most famous female doctor of the Ming Dynasty. Along the way, she meets and falls in love with Zhu Qizhen (Wallace Huo) and Zhu Qiyu (Huang Xuan), two royal siblings with opposite personalities who enter into a rivalry for the throne.

== Cast ==
=== Main ===
- Cecilia Liu as Tan Yunxian (譚允賢)
  - Zhang Zimu as young Yun Xian
- Wallace Huo as Zhu Qizhen (朱祁鎮)
  - Lou Yunhao as young Qi Zhen
- Huang Xuan as Zhu Qiyu (朱祁鈺)
  - Wu Ze Jin Xi as young Qi Yu

=== Supporting ===
==== Royals (House of Zhu) ====
- Li Cheng Yuan as Empress Qian (錢皇后), Zhu Qizhen's wife
  - Hu Shun Er as young Empress Qian
- Gina Jin as Wang Meilin (汪美麟), Zhu Qiyu's wife
- He Qing as Empress Dowager Sun (孫太后), Zhu Qizhen's mother
- He Yin as Empress Dowager Wu (吳太后), Zhu Qiyu's mother
- Gu Yan as deposed Empress Hu (靜慈師太)
- Sheng Lang Xi as Imperial Consort Zhou (周貴妃), Zhu Qizhen's concubine
- Jin Xiang as Consort Li (權麗妃), Zhu Qizhen's concubine
- Leo Wu as teenage Zhu Jianshen (朱見深), Zhu Qizhen and Empress Qian's son
  - Xia Zi Yu as child Jianshen
- Yuan Bingyan as Consort Liu

==== Northern Yuan ====
- Yuan Wen Kang as Ye Xian (也先), Ruler of the Northern Yuan. He likes Tan Yunxian.
- Li Chao as Bayan Temür (伯顏帖木兒), Ye Xian's younger brother and Zhu Qizhen's good friend
- Feng Li Li as Tuo Buhua (脫不花), Ye Xian's younger sister. She likes Zhu Qizhen.
- Zuo Jin Zhu as Meng Duo (蒙多)

==== Tan (Hang) Household ====
- Cui Ke Qu as Tan Fu (譚復), Yun Xian's grandfather
- Wang Li Yuan as Old Mrs Tan (譚老夫人), Yun Xian's grandmother
- Wang Xin Min as Tan Gang (譚綱), Yun Xian's father
- Zhang Yi Jie as Tan Yunliang (譚允良), Yun Xian's brother
- Yu Shasha as Zi Su (紫蘇), Yun Xian's personal attendant

==== Royal Physicians ====
- Liu Li Wei as Liu Pingan (劉平安), Yun Xian's master
- Zhang Lei as Cheng Shisan (程十三), the main antagonist who later betrays the Ming Dynasty
- Zhang Hao Ran as Cheng Cunxia (程村霞), Yun Xian's senior

==== Court Officials and servants ====
- Zhang Bo Jun as Wang Ying (汪瑛), Wang Meilin's father
- Deng Li Min as Wang Zhen (王振), Zhu Qizhen's ally
- Lu Sen Bao as Cao Jixiang (曹吉祥), Zhu Qiyu's ally
- Yang Guang as Zhao Guogong (趙國公)
- Xu Pengkai as General Shi Heng (石亨)
- Qu Zhe Ming as Xiao Shun Zi (小順子), Zhu Qizhen's servant
- Li Wei Ting as Xiao Ma Zi (小馬子), Zhu Qiyu's servant
- Hu Bingqing as Ru Xiang (如香), Empress Qian's personal attendant
- Lu Yuan Yuan as Ding Xiang (丁香), Yun Xian's personal attendant
- Ma Xiang Yi as Lan Cao (蘭草), Wang Meilin's personal attendant
- Tan Xin Rou as Yu Xiang (玉香), Empress Dowager Sun's personal attendant
- Fang Gong Min as Fan Gong (范弘), Empress Dowager Sun's confidante

==== Others ====
- Zhu Hong as Chen Biniang (陳碧娘), a dancer at Nan Xi Brothel
- Wang Chun Yuan as Wang Daoshi (王道士), Head of Nan Xi Brothel and Yun Xian's master
- Lv Liang as Yu Dongyang (于东阳), Yun Xian's godfather
- Lu Fang Mei as Madame Yu (于夫人), Yun Xian's godmother
- Fang Zi Chun as Luo Da Niang (罗大娘), a female physician who once taught Yun Xian

== Historical accuracy ==
The titular character in the drama series, Tan Yunxian, is a real-life historical figure who came from a renowned medical family. She was one of the few female physicians/doctors that was known to exist in history. Before her death, she published a book titled "Sayings of a Female Doctor", which was passed on throughout generations. However, the romance depicted in the drama between Tan Yunxian and the two Emperors is strictly fictional. In reality, Tan Yunxian did not exist in the same time period as Zhu Qizhen and Zhu Qiyu, and naturally would not be able to work at the Zhengtong Emperor's Palace. The character in the story is actually a combination of Tan Yunxian and the historical Empress Hang.

During the writing of the drama, screenwriter Zhang Wei consulted professional Chinese physicians regarding medical terminology and prescription use. Lead actress Cecilia Liu reportedly took lessons with a traditional physician to learn the basics of Chinese medicine and treatment (such as acupuncture, taking pulse and massage techniques) in preparation for the role.

== Soundtrack ==
No.	Title	Singer	Length
1.	"Heavy Rain is Coming (大雨将至)" (Opening theme song)	Lala Hsu	3:51
2.	"Typhoid Fever (傷寒)"	GJ	4:33
3.	"Before Forgotten (遺忘之前)"	Lala Hsu	3:52
4.	"Until That Day (直到那一天)" (Ending theme song)	Liu Xijun	4:28

== Reception ==
The series received positive feedback from the audience and topped Baidu's charts of most popular TV dramas in China. It gained attention for its exquisite costumes, showcase of traditional Chinese medicine and performance of its leads. The series was also noted for featuring a well-respected female figure in China history.

The series was also commercially successful, achieving an average ratings of 1.2 on both Dragon TV and Jiangsu TV and placing first in its ratings slot nationally. It was among the highest rated dramas of the year, and ranked #9 on Huading's Top 100 Satisfaction Survey for TV series.

=== Ratings ===
Broadcast date	Episode	Dragon TV CSM52 ratings			Jiangsu TV CSM52 ratings		
Broadcast date	Episode	Ratings (%)	Audience share (%)	Rank	Ratings (%)	Audience share (%)	Rank
2016.2.13	1-2	0.893	2.359	3	0.782	2.068	5
2016.2.14	3	0.918	2.435	4	0.646	1.714	10
2016.2.15	4-5	1.03	2.666	4	0.844	2.19	7
2016.2.16	6-7	0.978	2.56	4	0.902	2.37	5
2016.2.17	8-9	0.992	2.55	3	0.912	2.35	5
2016.2.18	10-11	0.988	2.58	4	0.956	2.5	5
2016.2.19	12-13	0.98	2.495	2	0.895	2.285	4
2016.2.20	14-15	1.127	2.96	2	0.881	2.32	4
2016.2.21	16-17	1.122	2.86	2	1.038	2.65	4
2016.2.22	18-19	1.09	2.745	1	1.029	2.596	4
2016.2.23	20-21	1.309	3.416	1	1.152	3.014	2
2016.2.24	22-23	1.279	3.4	1	1.228	3.28	2
2016.2.25	24-25	1.158	3.079	2	1.204	3.206	1
2016.2.26	26-27	1.205	3.116	2	1.244	3.227	1
2016.2.27	28-29	1.192	3.169	1	1.163	3.104	3
2016.2.28	30-31	1.36	3.539	1	1.32	3.441	2
2016.2.29	32-33	1.450	3.92	1	1.333	3.593	2
2016.3.1	34-35	1.540	4.188	1	1.260	3.434	2
2016.3.2	36-37	1.590	4.237	1	1.395	3.725	2
2016.3.3	38-39	1.530	4.134	1	1.260	3.400	2
2016.3.4	40-41	1.466	3.791	2	1.478	3.832	1
2016.3.5	42-43	1.521	3.926	1	1.471	3.796	2
2016.3.6	44	1.481	3.935	1	1.306	3.465	2
2016.3.7	45-46	1.725	4.52	1	1.406	3.69	2
2016.3.8	47-48	1.792	4.729	1	1.527	4.056	2
2016.3.9	49-50	2.007	5.118	1	1.706	4.375	2
Average ratings		1.296	3.39	-	1.175	3.08	-

- Highest ratings are marked in red, lowest ratings are marked in blue

=== Awards and nominations ===
Year	Awards	Category	Nominee	Results	Ref.
2016	1st China Television Drama Quality Ceremony	Most Influential Actress	Cecilia Liu	Won	
2016	1st China Television Drama Quality Ceremony	Most Influential Actor	Wallace Huo (also for Love Me If You Dare)	Won	
2016	1st China Television Drama Quality Ceremony	Most Popular Actor	Wallace Huo (also for Love Me If You Dare)	Won	
2016	3rd Hengdian Film and TV Festival of China	Best Actor	Huang Xuan	Won	
2017	2nd China Quality Television Drama Quality Ceremony	Quality Drama of the Year		Won	
2017	2nd China Quality Television Drama Quality Ceremony	Audience Favorite TV Series (Dragon TV)		Won	
2017	22nd Huading Awards	Best Actress	Cecilia Liu	Nominated	
2017	22nd Huading Awards	Top 10 Dramas		Won	
