= Gina Jin =

Chinese actress

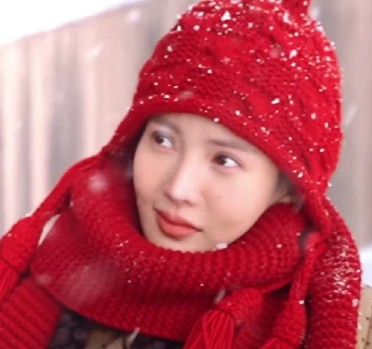
- Jin in 2024
- Born: September 5, 1990 (age 36); Jinan, Shandong, China
- Other name: Jin Chen
- Education: Beijing Dance Academy
- Occupations: Actress; model
- Years active: 2011–present
- Agent: Mountain Top
- Notable work: Li Yueya in Wu Xin: The Monster Killer; Ma Yan in Always on the Move
- Height: 171 cm (5 ft 7 in)

Chinese name
- Chinese: 金晨
Transcriptions
Standard Mandarin
- Hanyu Pinyin: Jīn Chén
- Website: iQIYI • Viki

Jin Chen (Chinese: 金晨, born 5 September 1990), also known as Gina Jin, is a Chinese actress and model. She is recognized for her role in the series Wu Xin: The Monster Killer, Candle in the Tomb: Mu Ye Gui Shi, and Always on the Move.

== Early life ==
Jin Chen was born in Jinan, Shandong; and is of Hui ethnicity. She did her schooling from Jinan Shengli Street Primary School; influenced by her dance-teacher parents, she began her formal dance training, and joined Affiliated Dance School of Shanghai Theatre Academy. In 2007, she graduated from Beijing Dance Academy majoring in Chinese Folk Dance.

== Career ==
in 2011, Jin debuted with a minor role in the wuxia drama Peacock Feather. She won the finals of the Chinese dance program Strictly Come Dancing Season 3, alongwith her partner Chris Lai Lok Yi. She then starred in historical drama Chu Han Zhengxiong, playing the role of Consort Yu.

In 2013, Jin played her first leading role in the war drama Tong Bai Hero. She made her film debut in Forever Love. She was nominated at the Shanghai International Film Festival for her performance in the thriller film Carpooling Shock.

In 2015, Jin rose to fame for her role as Yueya in the fantasy period drama Wu Xin: The Monster Killer. She gained further recognition for her role in the wuxia drama The Legend of Qin. In 2016, Jin starred as the female lead for the segment Chang Ting in the fantasy historical drama Legend of Nine Tails Fox alongside Wang Kai. She starred in the historical drama The Imperial Doctress playing the role of Empress Wang, and fantasy action drama Chinese Paladin 5 playing dual roles as twin sisters. In 2017, Jin played lead roles in the romance drama Little Valentine, and action adventure drama Candle in the Tomb: Mu Ye Gui Shi. In 2018, she starred alongside Jiro Wang in the historical romance comedy series Mengfei Comes Across.

In 2024, Jin's period drama Always on the Move, broke CCTV-8 primetime records with 4% CVB rating and won "2025 Beijing TV Art & Literature Award: 40 Years of Masterpieces".

== Influence ==
Jin is an ambassador for many brands including Adidas and Lancôme and Clarins. She is a prominent celebrity and fashion icon, regularly appears in the campaigns for brands like Prada, Rado watches, Wolford and Louis Vuitton; she features in notable magazines like Harper Bazaar, Elle, Marie Claire, Cosmopolitan, and Vogue.

== Filmography ==
=== Film ===
Year	English title	Chinese title	Role	Ref.
2013	Forever Love	201314	Wen Xin	
2013	Carpooling Shock	拼车惊情	Jiaojiao	
2015	Close Ladies	闺蜜心窍	Song Wanqin	
2017	Mr. Pride vs Miss Prejudice	傲娇与偏见	Momo	
2017	Dragon Force: So Long, Ultraman	钢铁飞龙之再见奥特曼		
2019	Invisible Fist	父子拳王	Song Cai'er	
2019	S.W.A.T.	特警队	Guo Qiaonan	
2020	Ghost Leader	闺蜜心窍	Song Wan Rong	
2023	No More Bets	孤注一掷	Liang Anna	
2022	Song of the Assassins	刺局	Qin Shengsheng	

=== Television series ===
Year	English title	Chinese title	Role	Ref.
2011	Peacock Feather	七种武器之孔雀翎	Hou Jian	
2012	Chu Han Zhengxiong	楚汉争雄	Hunan Channel	
2013	Tong Bai Hero	桐柏英雄	Han Meishuang	
2014	The Actions of Snow Eagle	雪鹰	Luo Xue	
2015	Wu Xin: The Monster Killer	无心法师	Li Yueya	
2015	The Legend of Qin	秦时明月	Chi Chen	
2016	Legend of Nine Tails Fox	青丘狐传说	Weng Changting 翁长亭	
2016	The Imperial Doctress	女医·明妃传	Empress Wang	
2016	Chinese Paladin 5	仙劍雲之凡	Ling Yin / Ling Bo	
2016	Legend of Ace	极品家丁	Xiao Yuruo	
2017	Little Valentine	小情人	Dandan	
2017	Candle in the Tomb: Mu Ye Gui Shi	鬼吹灯之牧野诡事	Bing Lun	
2018	Mengfei Comes Across	萌妃驾到	Bu Meng	
2019	Hope All is Well with Us	我们都要好好的	Ai Lisha	
2019	Can't Hide the Sun	掩不住的阳光	Su Mei	
2020	Kidnapping Game	十日游戏	Lu Jie	
2020	Fearless Whispers	隐秘而伟大	Shen Qinghe	
2020	Dear Missy	了不起的女孩	Shen Siyi	
2021	Song of Youth	玉楼春	Xu Fengqiao	
2021	You Are My Glory	你是我的荣耀	Xia Qing	
2021	Crossroad Bistro	北辙南辕	Dai Xiaoyu	
2022	Why Women Love	不会恋爱的我们	Zhao Jiang Yue	
2022	Falling Into You	炽道	Luo Na	
2023	The Road to Ordinary	平凡之路	Zuo Na	
2023	Hi Producer	正好遇见你	Wu Xin	
2024	Always on the Move	南来北往	Ma Yan	
2025	The Immortal Ascension	凡人修仙传	Nangong Wan	
TBA	Morning the Imperial Palace	早安故宫		

=== Variety shows ===
Year	English title	Chinese title	Role	Ref.
2016	Sisters Over Flowers	花样姐姐	Cast member	
2017	Flowers of Trip	旅途的花样	Cast member	
2020	Sisters Who Make Waves	乘风破浪的姐姐	Cast member	
2020	Meeting Mr. Right	女儿们的恋爱	Cast member	
2023	Natural High	现在就出发	Cast Member	
2024	Hello Saturday EP:6	你好，星期六	Guest	
2024	Natural High; Season:2	现在就出发	Cast Member	
2025	Natural High; Season:3	现在就出发	Cast Member	

== Discography ==
Year	English title	Chinese title	Notes	Ref.
2019	"Starry Sea"	星辰大海	For China Movie Channel Young Actors Project; Various artists	

== Awards and nominations ==
Year	Award	Category	Nominated work	Result	Ref.
2013	16th Shanghai International Film Festival	Best New Actress	Carpooling Shock	Nominated	
2016	Rayli Fans Festival	Dazzling Female Artist	—N/a	Won	
2016	Best Taste Award Ceremony	Energetic Artist	—N/a	Won	
2016	Mobile Video Festival	Popularity Award	—N/a	Won	
2017	74th Taormina Film Fest	Kineo Anica Most Promising Newcomer	—N/a	Won	
2017	Rayli Magazine Award Ceremony	Philanthropy Role Model	—N/a	Won	
2017	iFeng Fashion Choice Award	Fashion Popularity Award	—N/a	Won	
2017	24th Cosmo Beauty Ceremony	Beautiful Idol	—N/a	Won	
2018	OnlyLady & KIMISS Fashion Awards	Popular Female Star	—N/a	Won	
2019	11th China TV Drama Awards	Youth Style Actress	—N/a	Won	
2020	7th The Actors of China Award Ceremony	Best Actress (Emerald)	—N/a	Nominated	
2024	China TV Drama Quality Jury Awards	Quality Drama Star of The Year	Always On The Move	Won	
2025	Tencent Video TV And Movie Award	Popular Variety Show Group of the Year	Natural High; Season 2: Lets Go Now	Won	
