= Kim Hye-yoon filmography =

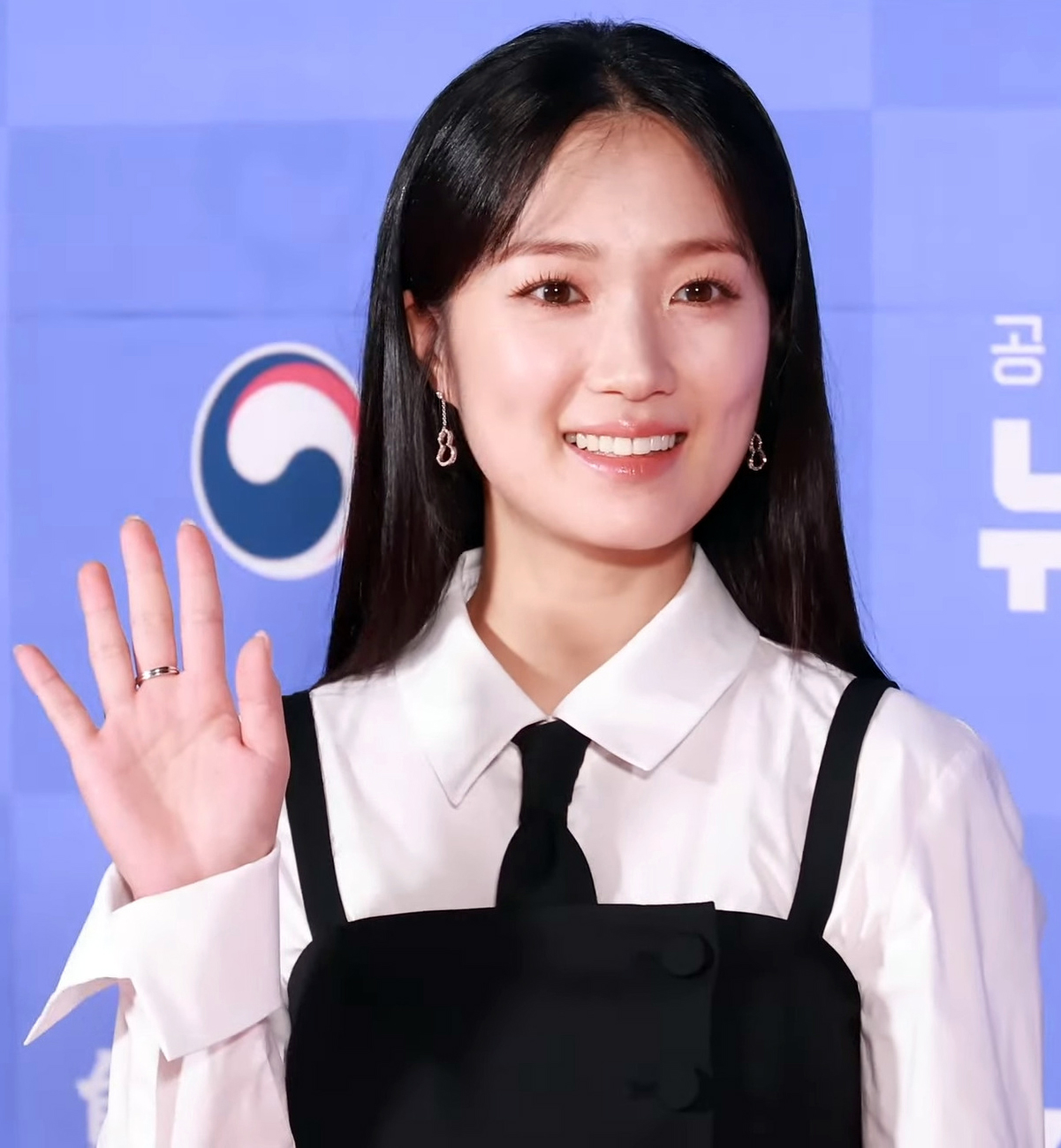
- Kim in 2024
- Film: 35
- Television series: 35
- Web series: 7
- Television show: 3
- Hosting: 3
- Music videos: 5

Kim Hye-yoon (born November 10, 1996) is a South Korean actress. She embarked on her acting journey in 2012, officially debuting in 2013 with a supporting role in the KBS2 TV Novel's Samsaengi. Over the years, she appeared in a range of films and television series, often in minor or supporting roles. Kim career took a major turn in 2019 when she gained widespread recognition for her role in the hit series Sky Castle. This breakthrough role marked her transition to leading roles in subsequent projects.

== Film ==
=== Feature film ===
| Year | Title | Role | Notes | Ref. |
|---|---|---|---|---|
| 2013 | Hide and Seek | Middle school girl | Extra | |
| 2015 | Helios | Park Woo-cheol's sister | | |
| 2016 | The Bacchus Lady | Nurse | | |
| 2017 | Memoir of a Murderer | Young Maria | | |
| 2019 | Another Child | Jung Hyun-joo | Extra | |
| 2019 | The Bad Guys: Reign of Chaos | Oh Ji-yeon | Cameo | |
| 2021 | Midnight | Choi So-jung | | |
| 2022 | The Girl on a Bulldozer | Goo Hye-young | | |
| 2022 | Ditto | Seo Han-sol | | |
| 2026 | Salmokji: Whispering Water | Han Soo-in | | |
| TBA | Land | Do-yeon | | |
| TBA | Teen Cop | Hee-yeon | | |

=== Short film ===
| Year | Title | Role | Notes | Ref. |
|---|---|---|---|---|
| 2013 | Hello Seoul | young Park Mi-ok | Promotional short film produced for MIOGGI Hong Kong | |
| 2015 | You Can't Stop the Beat | | Documentary film | |
| 2016 | Broken | Hye-yoon | 9th Konkuk Graduation Film Festival | |
| 2016 | The Road Not Taken | Girl | 9th Konkuk Graduation Film Festival | |
| 2016 | Chicken Run | | 9th Konkuk Graduation Film Festival | |
| 2016 | Deviation | | 25th Konkuk Film Festival | |
| 2016 | Spring Sky | | 25th Konkuk Film Festival | |
| 2016 | Ugly Day | So-hyun | 25th Konkuk Film Festival | |
| 2016 | Grasshopper Complex | | 26th Konkuk Film Festival | |
| 2017 | The Day I Hate to Go to School | Lim Eun-jung | | |
| 2017 | Suncheon Memory | Yeon-oh | | |
| 2017 | Claw Crane | young Eun-ah | | |
| 2017 | Interview | | 2nd Konkuk Univ. Film Major Graduation Film Festival | |
| 2017 | Lyrical World | | 2nd Konkuk Univ. Film Major Graduation Film Festival | |
| 2017 | Irreversible Isn't it | | 2nd Konkuk Univ. Film Major Graduation Film Festival | |
| 2017 | Say to You | | 2nd Konkuk Univ. Film Major Graduation Film Festival | |
| 2017 | Father's Face | Park Hye-yoon | 2nd Konkuk Univ. Film Major Graduation Film Festival | |
| 2018 | Dawn to Dawn | Sun-young | | |
| 2018 | Betta | Kim Jung-hyun | 34th Korean Academy of Film Arts Graduation Film Festival | |
| 2018 | A Report on the Banality of Judgment | Yoon-ji | 29th Konkuk Film Festival | |
| 2019 | Yesterday | Hye-ji | | |
| 2019 | Today | Hye-ji | | |
| 2019 | Tomorrow | Seul-gi | | |
| 2020 | Our Summer Poem | Seo-jung | 46th Seoul Independent Film Festival | |

== Television series ==
| Year | Title | Role | Notes | Ref. |
|---|---|---|---|---|
| 2013 | Samsaengi | teenage Jung Yoon-hee | KBS TV Novel | |
| 2013 | King of Ambition | Girl at the bus stop | Extra, Ep. 22 | |
| 2013 | I Can Hear Your Voice | Kim Yeon-jin | Extra, Ep. 1 | |
| 2013 | The Suspicious Housekeeper | Bang Soo-yeon | Extra, Ep. 6 | |
| 2014 | Wang's Family | young Wang Ho-bak | Extra, Ep. 40 | |
| 2014 | Bad Guys | Oh Ji-yeon | | |
| 2014 | Pride and Prejudice | Kang Han-na | Extra, Ep. 15 | |
| 2015 | Punch | Cho Kang-jae's daughter | Extra, Ep. 11 | |
| 2015 | A Daughter Just Like You | young Ma Ji-sung | Extra, Ep. 1 | |
| 2015 | The Return of Hwang Geum-bok | young Hwang Eun-sil | Extra, Ep. 7 | |
| 2015 | Hidden Identity | young Jang Min-joo | Extra, Ep. 14 | |
| 2015 | Mrs. Cop | Runaway girl | Extra, Ep. 5 | |
| 2016 | Mystery Freshman | University student | Extra, Ep. 1 | |
| 2016 | The Doctors | School girl | Extra, Ep. 2 | |
| 2016 | Cinderella with Four Knights | Convenience store cashier | Extra, Ep.2 | |
| 2016 | Shopping King Louie | Song Yeon-ah | Extra, Ep. 2, 6–7, 13 | |
| 2016 | The Legend of the Blue Sea | Jang Jin-ok's daughter | Extra, Ep. 3 | |
| 2016–2017 | Guardian: The Lonely and Great God | Young version of a widowed old lady | Extra, Ep. 15 | |
| 2017 | Queen of the Ring | Sitting woman | Extra, Ep. 10 | |
| 2017 | Tunnel | Young Kim Young-ja | Extra, Ep. 3 and 13 | |
| 2017 | Radiant Office | Disorderly student | Extra, Ep. 8 | |
| 2017–2018 | Man in the Kitchen | Jung Soo-ji | | |
| 2018 | Come and Hug Me | Yeon Shil | Extra, Ep. 6–7 | |
| 2018 | Let's Eat 3 | Car accident patient's daughter | Extra, Ep. 1 | |
| 2018–2019 | Sky Castle | Kang Ye-seo | | |
| 2019 | Extraordinary You | Eun Dan-oh | | |
| 2020 | Record of Youth | Lee Bo-ra | Cameo, Ep. 1 | |
| 2020 | Live On | Seo Hyun-ah | Cameo, Ep. 1 | |
| 2020 | True Beauty | Eun Dan-oh | Cameo, Ep. 4 | |
| 2021 | Secret Royal Inspector & Joy | Kim Jo-yi | | |
| 2021–2022 | Snowdrop | Kye Boon-ok | | |
| 2022 | Cleaning Up | Joo-hyeon | Cameo, Ep.1, 7, 13–15 | |
| 2024 | Lovely Runner | Im Sol | | |
| 2026 | No Tail to Tell | Eun-ho / Kim Ok-soon | | |
| 2026 | Good Partner 2 | Kang Hye-seong | | |

== Web series ==
| Year | Title | Role | Notes | Ref. |
|---|---|---|---|---|
| 2016 | Secret Crushes Season 1 | Actress | | |
| 2016 | Secret Crushes Season 2 | Kim Hye-yoon | | |
| 2016 | Drunkard | Shin Ho-jung | | |
| 2017 | Secret Crushes Season 3 | Kim Hye-yoon | Cameo appearance | |
| 2017 | Supernatural? | Shin Ho-jung | | |
| 2018 | Social Story – Tears of Job Seeker | Kim Hye-yoon | | |
| 2019 | Secret Crushes Special Edition | Kim Hye-yoon | Promotional web series produced for KB Kookmin Card | |

== Television shows ==
| Year | Title | Role | Notes | Ref. |
|---|---|---|---|---|
| 2021 | Beauty and the Beast | Cast Member | | |
| 2021 | Law of the Jungle | Cast Member | in Jeju (Episode 446–448) | |
| 2026 | Sister's Direct Delivery 2 | Cast Member | Spin-off | |

== Hosting ==
| Year | Title | Notes | Ref. |
|---|---|---|---|
| 2024 | 2024 SBS Drama Awards | With Shin Dong-yup and Kim Ji-yeon | |
| 2025 | Asia Star Entertainer Awards | With Hyungwon (Monsta X) and Younghoon (The Boyz) | |
| 2025 | KM Chart Awards | With Ong Seong-wu | |

== Music video appearances ==
| Year | Song title | Artist | Ref. |
|---|---|---|---|
| 2017 | "Water Dept" (수도국) | 9 and the Numbers | |
| 2019 | "Day by Day" (English ver.) (하루하루) | Bigman | |
| 2020 | "Not Anyone Else" (다른 누구 말고 너야) | Kim Na-young | |
| 2020 | "Afternoon" | Jay Park, Golden, pH-1 | |
| 2022 | "Drunken Night" (술이 뭐길래) | Zia, Huh Gak | |
