= Jingtai Mausoleum =

Mausoleum in Beijing, China

- 景泰陵
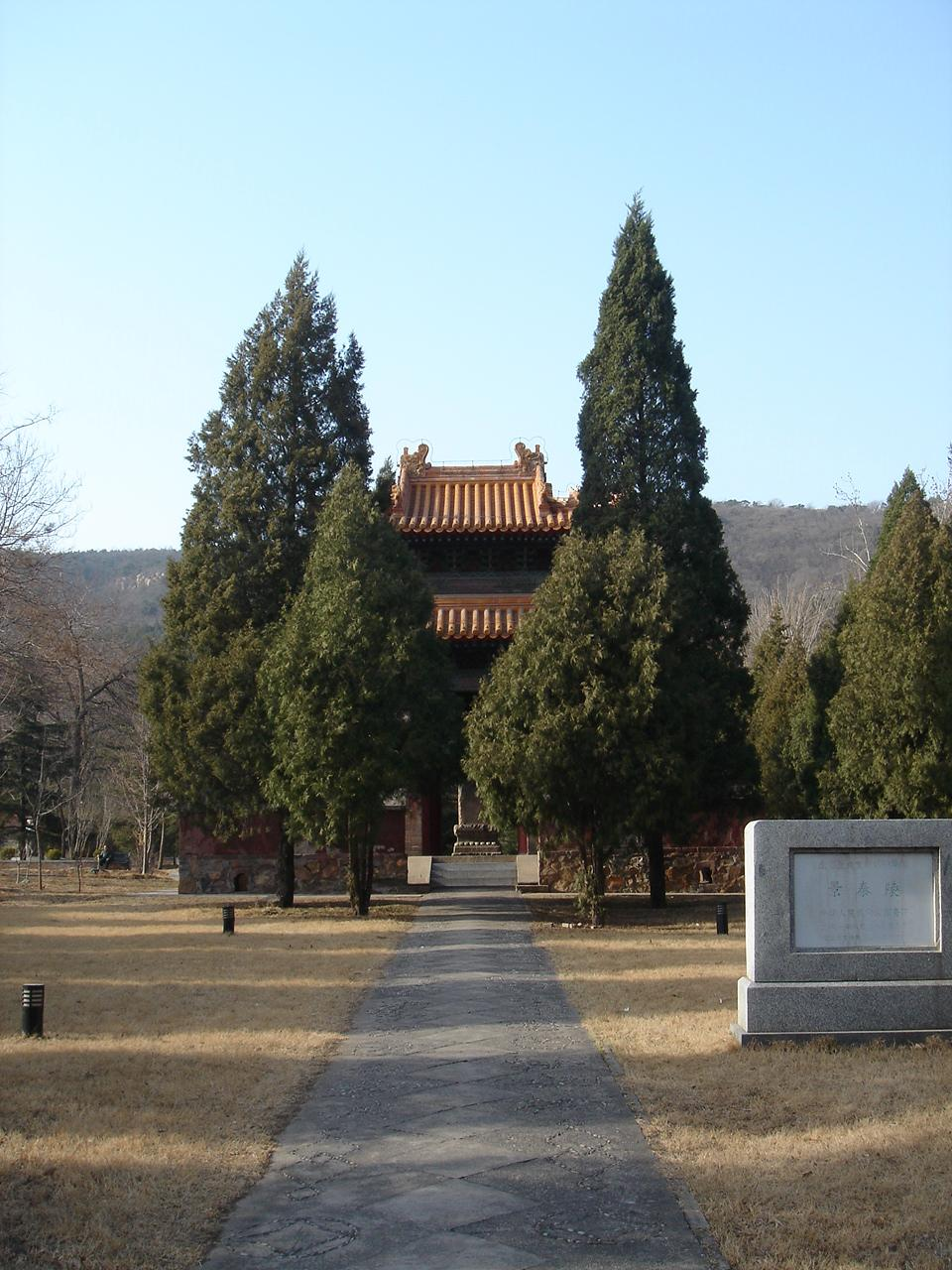
- Interactive map of the Jingtai Mausoleum area

General information
- Location: Haidian District, Beijing, China
- Coordinates: 40°00′08.28″N 116°14′10.48″E

The Jingtai Mausoleum (Chinese: 景泰陵; pinyin: Jǐngtàilíng) is the mausoleum of the Jingtai Emperor, the seventh emperor of the Ming dynasty. It is located in the Haidian District, 17 km northwest of central Beijing, and is situated north of Jingming Park.

After the Tumu Crisis of 1449, the Jingtai Emperor placed his brother, the former Emperor Yingzong, under house arrest in the Forbidden City. In 1457, Emperor Yingzong took the throne after a palace coup and the Jingtai Emperor died shortly thereafter. At the time of his death, the Jingtai Emperor had nearly completed his tomb at the Ming tombs complex, but Empetor Yingzong ordered its destruction. Instead, the Jingtai Emperor was buried as a prince along with Empress Wang north of Yuquan Mountain at the foot of the Western Mountains in the northwestern outskirts of Beijing. During the reign of the Chenghua Emperor (r. 1464–1487), the tomb was upgraded to an imperial tomb.

The original and long-unused tomb of the Jingtai Emperor was rebuilt in 1621 as Qing Mausoleum, where the Taichang Emperor was buried in the same year.

Compared to the other imperial tombs from the Ming dynasty, Jingtai Mausoleum is smaller. The remains of the tomb are in very poor condition and the area where it is located now serves as a residential area for retired military personnel.

== See also ==
- Ming tombs
