= Yoon Kyung-ho =

South Korean actor (born 1980)

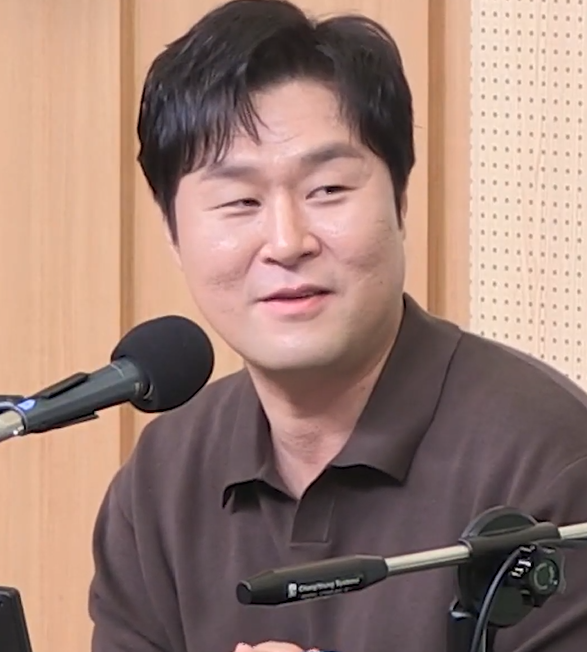
- Yoon in September 2022
- Born: July 5, 1980 (age 46); Jeollanam-do, South Korea
- Education: Woosuk University - Graduate in Theater
- Occupation: Actor
- Years active: 2002–present
- Agent: Management Koo

Korean name
- Hangul: 윤경호
- Hanja: 尹敬浩
- RR: Yun Gyeongho
- MR: Yun Kyŏngho

Yoon Kyung-ho (Korean: 윤경호, born July 5, 1980) is a South Korean theatre, film and television actor. He debuted in 2002 in SBS's documentary drama Savage Age. He came into prominence in KBS's 2017 legal drama Witch at Court and tvN's 2019 TV series The Crowned Clown. He also appeared in 2012 historical comedy film I Am the King. In 2022, he is cast in JTBC's drama Cleaning Up.

== Career ==
Yoon Kyung-ho debuted in the entertainment world in 2006 and appeared in small film roles. He debuted in television in 2014 and since then he appeared in supporting roles in Witch at Court (2017), I Picked Up a Celebrity on the Street (2018), The Dude in Me (2019), and Juror 8 (2019).

In 2022, he appeared in Netflix original web series All of Us Are Dead and The Sound of Magic. He is also cast in JTBC's TV series Green Mothers' Club and Cleaning Up, which is based on the 2019 British series of the same name.

== Filmography ==
=== Films ===
Year	Title	Role	Notes	Ref.
2006	Oh! My God			
2006	How the Lack of Love Affects Two Men			
2009	Daytime Drinking	Friend 1		
2010	Wedding Dress	Ambulance worker		
2011	The Last Blossom	Cushion house guy		
2011	Countdown	Tae-won		
2011	Punch	Man at Traditional Market #3		
2012	I Am the King	Geun-Bae		
2013	Boomerang Family	Butcher		
2013	The Face Reader	Im-woon		
2013	Steel Cold Winter	Teacher		
2014	The Plan Man	Drunk middle aged man		
2014	Total Messed Family	Judo director		
2014	Kundo: Age of the Rampant	Jo Yoon's slave 2		
2014	Tazza: The Hidden Card	Gambler in billiards hall		
2015	Salut d'Amour	Cop 1		
2015	The Accidental Detective	Detective Ma		
2016	A Violent Prosecutor	Hyeon Seok-pae clique big guy 2		
2016	Ron-off	Junior representative team coach		
2016	Life Risking Romance	Police Chief /Noh Duk-Sool		
2017	My Little Brother	Dal-joo		
2017	Blue Busking	Hyeon-woo		
2017	Real	Broker		
2017	Okja	Mirando employee		
2017	The Battleship Island	Dauber		
2018	On Your Wedding Day	Police station detective		
2018	Intimate Strangers	Young-bae		
2019	Mal-Mo-E: The Secret Mission	Optometrist		
2019	The Dude in Me	Boss Yang, Jang Pan-soo's rival		
2019	Svaha: The Sixth Finger	Cattle shed owner		
2019	Juror 8	Jo Jin-sik		
2019	Start-Up	Kim Dong-hwa		
2020	Honest Candidate	Bong Man-sik		
2021	The Book of Fish	Moon Soon-deuk		
2021	Kids Are Fine	Da-i's dad		
2021	Escape from Mogadishu	ANSP senior officer		
2022	Kingmaker	Mr. Kim, politician of the ruling party		
2022	Air Murder	Manager		
2022	I Want to Know Your Parents	Public prosecutor		
2022	Alienoid	Samsik	special appearance	
2022	Seoul Vibe	Mr. Yoon	special appearance; Netflix film	
2022	Honest Candidate 2	Bong Man-sik		
2022	Daemuga	Baek Bong	Special appearance	
2022	Birth	Hyeon Seok-moon		
2023	Kill Boksoon	Yang No-soon	Special appearance	
2023	Love Reset	Ki-bae		
2024	Revolver	Attorney Yang		
2024	The Desperate Chase	Ju Rin-fang		
2025	My Daughter Is a Zombie	Jo Dong-bae		
2026	The Ultimate Duo	Dong-oh		
2026	Husbands in Action	Kim Yong-kang		
2027	Teen Cop	Kyu-jin		

=== Television series ===
Key
†	Denotes television productions that have not yet been released

Year	Title	Role	Notes	Ref.
2014	Golden Cross			
2015	The Missing			
2015	Oh My Ghost	Broadcast PD	(ep. 12)	
2015-16	Remember	Hit man		
2016	Memory	Kim Chang-soo		
2016-17	Guardian: The Lonely and Great God	Kim Woo-sik		
2017	Voice	Yoon Pil-bae	Season 1	
2017	Duel	Lee Hyung-sik		
2017	Stranger	Kang Jin-sub	Season 1	
2017	Hello, My Twenties!	Moon Hyo-jin's boyfriend	Season 2	
2017	KBS Drama Special: "Madame Jung's One Last Week"	Eun-mi's Stepfather	Season 8, episode 5	
2017	Witch at Court	Goo Seok-chan		
2017-18	I'm Not a Robot	Security team leader		
2018	Mr. Sunshine	Seung-goo's father		
2018	Where Stars Land	Rude customer	(ep. 1)	
2019	The Crowned Clown	Kap-soo		
2019	Confession	Heo Jae-man		
2019	When the Devil Calls Your Name	Kang Pil-seong		
2019	Psychopath Diary	Na In Hye	Special appearance	
2019	Drama Stage: "Ogre"	Gold boss	Season 3, episode 1	
2019	JTBC Drama Festa: "Luwak Human"	Kim Yeong-seok		
2020	Itaewon Class	Oh Byeong-heon		
2020	Team Bulldog: Off-Duty Investigation	Teddy Jung		
2020	SF8 "The Prayer"		Epi 1	
2020-21	Awaken	Lee Ji-wook		
2021	Vincenzo	Nam Shin-bae	Special appearance	
2022	Green Mothers' Club	Lee Man-su		
2022	Cleaning Up	Oh Dong-ju		
2026	The Legend of Kitchen Soldier	Park Ja-young		
2026	Agent Kim Reactivated	Park Jin-cheol		

=== Television shows ===
Year	Title	Role	Notes	Ref.
2025	Foreign Student Ryu Nam-saeng	Cast member		

=== Web series ===
Year	Title	Role	Ref.
2018	I Picked Up a Celebrity on the Street	Byun Ji-yong	
2021	My Name	Yoon Dong-hoon	
2022	All of Us Are Dead	Jung Yong-nam	
2022	The Sound of Magic	Kim Doo-shik, convenience store owner	
2023	The Worst of Evil	Hwang Min-goo	
2023	Vigilante	Kim Sam-doo	
2025	The Trauma Code: Heroes on Call	Han Yoo-rim	

=== Theater ===
Year	Title	Role	Ref.
2008	Last Game	Zidane	
2011	Sweet One Night	Multinam	
2011	Whimsical Romance	Multinam	
2011	Birth of Mildang	Prince Haemyeong	
2015	Agatha	Captain	
2015	Whale Whale	Hobin's manager/Min-sook's father	
2022	True West	Lee	

== Accolades ==
=== Awards and nominations ===
Name of the award ceremony, year presented, category, nominee of the award, and the result of the nomination
Award ceremony	Year	Category	Nominee / Work	Result	Ref.
APAN Star Awards	2022	Best Supporting Actor	My Name	Nominated	
APAN Star Awards	2025	Excellence Acting Award, Actor	The Trauma Code: Heroes on Call	Won	
Baeksang Arts Awards	2025	Best Supporting Actor – Television	The Trauma Code: Heroes on Call	Nominated	
Blue Dragon Film Awards	2025	Best Supporting Actor	My Daughter is a Zombie	Nominated	
Blue Dragon Series Awards	2025	Best Supporting Actor	The Trauma Code: Heroes on Call	Nominated	
Blue Dragon Series Awards	2026	Best Supporting Actor	The Legend of Kitchen Soldier	Won	
MBC Drama Awards	2024	Best Supporting Actor	Doubt	Nominated	

=== Listicles ===
Name of publisher, year listed, name of listicle, and placement
Publisher	Year	Listicle	Placement	Ref.
Korean Film Council	2021	Korean Actors 200 (Note: The list introduces the 200 actors that best represent the present and future of Korean cinema to the people in the film industry all over the world.)	Placed	
