= Tan Yunxian =

Chinese physician (1461–1554)

Tan Yunxian 談允賢
- Born: 1461
- Died: 1554 (aged 92–93)
- Children: 1 Son and 3 Daughters
- Father: Tán Gāng

Tan Yunxian (Chinese: 談允賢; 1461–1554) was a Chinese female physician during the Ming dynasty.

== Life ==
Tan's grandmother was the daughter of a physician. In fact, one reason Tan's grandfather married her grandmother was to learn medicine himself. Two of her grandparents' sons, including Tan's father, were able to pass the jinshi examinations, and they became officials. Due to the fondness her grandparents had for her, which evidence shows was directly related to her intellect, her grandparents passed on their medical knowledge to Tan. Tan's grandmother left her medical manuals and tools upon her deathbed to be passed onto Tan. Tan inherited many medical documents from her grandparents. She studied these medical works day and night. However, she did not start implementing this knowledge until she herself became ill.

Tan Yunxian's family background and their involvement in medicine is crucial to her future success in the field herself. Although her family was well equipped and acclaimed, she herself insisted that her family is more known for their Confucian studies and only considers medicine as a secondary skill. Especially given her unique position as a female doctor in the 15th century, it seems odd that she would not use her lineage to help her career, however, it does speak to her character and how she went about her professional career.

Tan Yunxian later married, raised four children, and practiced medicine on women. Out of these four children, two were sons. Both of these sons died at a young age, ending her family line, according to patriarchy. However, her daughters carried on her mitochondrial DNA. Tan lived a longer life than most people at this time, dying at the age of 93.

=== Medical activity ===
Tan Yunxian's medical practice was confined to treating women. She initially began by treating her own children, with her grandmother's guidance to confirm her diagnoses. She was known to diagnose herself and others of her family and compare that diagnosis to that of the outside doctor. She would then collect his prescriptions and pick and choose ingredients at her discretion to better treat the ailment. Records of Tan's book reveal cases of thirty-one of the patients that she treated. The women she worked with usually had chronic complaints, rather than of temporary illnesses. Many of these women had “women’s complaints,” such as menstrual irregularities, repeated miscarriages, barrenness, and postpartum fatigue. Other patients had illnesses that either sex could contract, such as coughing, insomnia, rashes, swellings, diarrhea or nausea.

Tan, similar to other literati doctors, often prescribed herbal medications to her patients. She also practiced moxibustion. This was the burning of moxa, or dried Artemisia, at specified points on the body, which was similar to acupuncture. This process was believed to stimulate the circulation of qi. Since the physician applying the moxa had to physically touch the patient, male doctors were unable to perform this treatment on women. Tan served many working women in her practice. Various accounts show Tan's conclusions that these women often overworked themselves, whether physically or mentally thus bringing on various symptoms.

Although Tan Yunxian was able to practice gynecology, pediatrics and obstetrics, her experience in other fields was limited. Tan was only able to practice medicine in the country among her friends or acquaintances. Even after she completed her autobiographical account Sayings of a Female Doctor, the only physician book written by a woman in the Ming Dynasty, she was not able to publish it. In fact, she had to ask her son to have printing blocks cut for her. In the prologue of her book, Tan frets about its reception due to her being a female author. She says "I beg readers' indulgence and ask that they do not laugh at me."

== Status of female physicians in Ming China ==
Quite different from their male counterparts of ancient China, women did not hone their skills by studying with masters nor did they have the purpose or goal in mind to set up their own clinics after their apprenticeship. For females, family training was the standard mode of education. While women were quite skilled in their medical techniques, they rarely made any recorded theoretical additions to the field. Unlike the male doctors of the times, women received medical training in order to assist the males in their family by doing some “supporting work.” After practicing medicine it is said that "she always get wonderful therapeutic effects in treating those females who refuse to see a male physician". Women in Ming China could not ask their male doctors about certain medical conditions.

Male doctors were often not allowed to physically touch women due to issues of propriety and gender norms. A male doctor could not touch a woman during an examination, but rather had to review her symptoms through asking her questions. They may also use a male relative or husband as a go-between. This caused additional issues in cases such as bone setting where physical touch is required.

However, not all parts of the female body were prohibited from the touch of a doctor, such as the head. Propriety also depended upon the age of the woman; older women past childbearing age and young children were exempted from many physical boundaries, but women of marrying age were treated with extra propriety.

There is no evidence of female doctors being discriminated against at this time. Female doctors' names are listed in the Deities where medical development was published. Although females had their accounts taken in and women were successful in the medical field because male doctors could not look at a female patient, women midwives were needed, and female physicians needed more representation. Female doctors had an advantage in working with just women patients because they knew the nature of their bodies, and many had already birthed children. They knew how a woman's body worked and if something was different and needed additional care. Obstetrics and gynecology were the only ways women could practice medicine. Every other practice made it hard for women to be taken seriously in the medical field.

== Popular portrayal ==
A character that combines Tan with Jingtai Emperor consort Empress Hang was portrayed by Cecilia Liu in 2016 Chinese historical drama series The Imperial Doctress. In that series, the character's surname was changed from 談 to the homophone surname 譚. The series focuses on a fictionalized love triangle between Tan and two emperors, with her medical work becoming a side plot. The series' lavish yet historically accurate costumes are reported to cost over $460,000 USD.

Tan is the main character of Lisa See's 2023 novel Lady Tan's Circle of Women (ISBN 1982117087). The novel focuses on the personal life of Tan, beginning with her education from her grandmother and through her struggles as a female physician in the Ming Dynasty. The novel also focuses on her friendship with a midwife, and the stigmas surrounding this friendship at the time.
