= Dragon Force (disambiguation) =

Dragon Force is a 1996 role-playing video game from Sega created for the Sega Saturn.

Dragon Force or DragonForce may also refer to:

- DragonForce, a British power metal band from London, England
- Dragon Force (film), a 1982 martial arts film
- Dragon Force: So Long, Ultraman, a 2017 Chinese action animated film
