= Xiaozhuang =

Xiaozhuang may refer to:

People

- Emperor Xiaozhuang of Northern Wei (北魏孝莊帝; 507–531)
- Empress Xiaozhuangrui (孝庄睿皇后; 1426–1468), consort of the Ming dynasty ruler Yingzong
- Empress Xiaozhuangwen (孝庄文皇后; 1613–1688), concubine of the Qing dynasty ruler Hong Taiji

Places

- Xiaozhuang Township, Yanshan County, Hebei (小庄乡)
- Xiaozhuang Township, Chiping County (肖庄乡), in Chiping County, Shandong
- Xiaozhuang Village, Qixia District, Nanjing

Television series

- Xiaozhuang Mishi (孝庄秘史), 2003 television series depicting the early history of the Qing Dynasty
