= Consort Meng =

Consort Meng may refer to:

- Princess Meng (fl. 413), Juqu Mengxun's wife
- Empress Meng (1073–1131), Emperor Zhezong's wife

== See also ==
- Consort Meng Arrives, 2018 Chinese television series
