= Empress Xiaozhuang =

Empress Xiaozhuang may refer to:

- Empress Xiaozhuangrui (1426–1468), married to the Zhengtong Emperor
- Empress Xiaozhuangwen (1613–1688), married to Hong Taiji
