= Lim Yoona filmography =

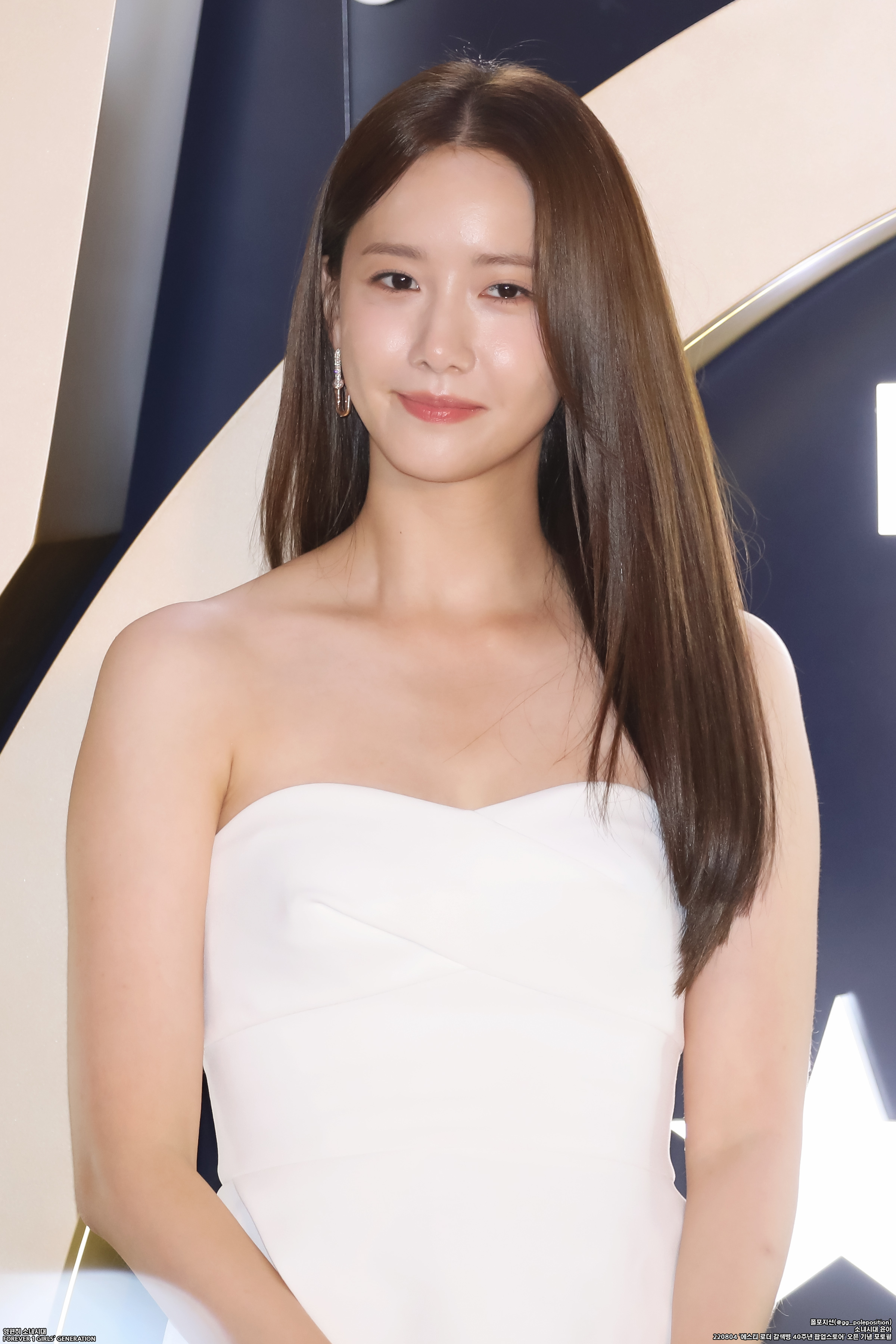
- Im in 2022
- Film: 9
- Television series: 16
- Web series: 1
- Television show: 3
- Hosting: 27

Lim Yoona (Korean: 임윤아; born May 30, 1990), known mononymously as Yoona, is a South Korean singer and actress. She is a member of girl group Girls' Generation, and its subgroup Girls' Generation-Oh!GG.

== Film ==
Year	Title	Role	Notes	Ref.
2012	I AM.	Herself	Biographical film of SM Town	
2015	SMTown The Stage	Herself	Documentary film of SM Town	
2017	Confidential Assignment	Park Min-young		
2019	Exit	Jung Eui-joo		
2021	Miracle: Letters to the President	Song Ra-hee		
2021	House of Hummingbird	Narrator	Barrier-free version	
2021	A Year-End Medley	Soo-yeon		
2022	Confidential Assignment 2: International	Park Min-young		
2025	Pretty Crazy	Jeong Seon-ji		
2026	Husbands in Action	Kim Yong-gang's wife	Cameo	

== Television series ==
Year	Title	Role	Notes	Ref.
2007	Two Outs in the Ninth Inning	Shin Joo-young		
2008	Unstoppable Marriage	Bulgwang-dong's Seven Princesses Gang	Cameo (episode 64)	
2008	Woman of Matchless Beauty, Park Jung-geum	Mi-ae	Cameo (episodes 19, 20, 23)	
2008–2009	You Are My Destiny	Jang Sae-byuk		
2009	Cinderella Man	Seo Yoo-jin		
2012	Love Rain	Kim Yoon-hee / Jung Ha-na		
2013–2014	Prime Minister & I	Nam Da-jung		
2015	My First Time	Lim Yoona	Cameo (episode 1)	
2016	God of War, Zhao Yun	Xiahou Qingyi / Ma Yurou	Chinese drama	
2016	The K2	Go An-na		
2017	The King in Love	Eun San / So-hwa		
2020–2021	Hush	Lee Ji-soo		
2022	Big Mouth	Go Mi-ho		
2023	King the Land	Cheon Sa-rang		
2025	Bon Appétit, Your Majesty	Yeon Ji-young		
2027	Unnatural	Lim Do-eun		

== Web series ==
Year	Title	Role	Notes	Ref.
2015	Innisfree Summer Love	Lim Yoona	Innisfree and Insight TV channel Promotional drama for Innisfree products	

== Television shows ==
Year	Title	Role	Notes	Ref.
2010	Family Outing 2	Regular cast		
2018	Hyori's Homestay	Regular cast	Season 2	

== Hosting ==
Year	Title	Notes	Ref.
2009	KBS Entertainment Awards	with Lee Kyung-kyu & Lee Ji-ae	
2010	World Cup Festival	with Kim Yong-man & Yoon Hyun-jin	
2010	Sharing Love Concert	with Jung Yong-hwa & Jo Kwon	
2011	KBS Entertainment Awards	with Shin Dong-yup & Lee Ji-ae	
2011	SBS Gayo Daejeon	with Lee Seung-gi & Song Ji-hyo	
2012	KBS Song Festival	with Sung Si-kyung & Jung Yong-hwa	
2013	KBS Drama Awards	with Lee Mi-sook, Shin Hyun-joon & Joo Sang-wook	
2013	Korea-China Friendship Concert	with Ok Taec-yeon & Cho Kyuhyun (at Beijing, China)	
2014	KBS Song Festival	with Lee Hwi-jae & Ok Taec-yeon	
2015	DMZ Peace Concert	with Kim Sung-joo	
2015	MBC Gayo Daejejeon	with Kim Sung-joo	
2016	Women in Film Awards	at ARTNINE in Seoul	
2016	MBC Gayo Daejejeon	with Kim Sung-joo	
2017	22nd Busan International Film Festival	With Jang Dong-gun	
2017	2018 Pyeongchang Winter Olympics G-100 K-POP Concert	with Bae Sung-jae	
2017	MBC Gayo Daejejeon	with Suho & Cha Eun-woo	
2018	MBC Gayo Daejejeon	with Noh Hong-chul, Choi Min-ho & Cha Eun-woo	
2019	MBC Gayo Daejejeon	with Cha Eun-woo & Jang Sung-kyu	
2020	MBC Gayo Daejejeon	with Jang Sung-kyu & Kim Seon-ho	
2021	MBC Gayo Daejejeon	with Lee Jun-ho & Jang Sung-kyu	
2022	1st Blue Dragon Series Awards	with Jun Hyun-moo	
2022	MBC Gayo Daejejeon	with Lee Jun-ho & Jang Sung-kyu	
2023	2nd Blue Dragon Series Awards	with Jun Hyun-moo	
2023	MBC Gayo Daejejeon	with Choi Min-ho & Hwang Min-hyun	
2024	3rd Blue Dragon Series Awards	with Jun Hyun-moo	
2024	MBC Gayo Daejejeon	with Choi Min-ho & Dohoon	
2025	4th Blue Dragon Series Awards	with Jun Hyun-moo	
