= Chu Han Zhengxiong =

- 楚汉争雄
- Genre: Historical drama
- Based on: Chu Han Zhengxiong by Xiong Cheng
- Screenplay by: Song Jinchuan
- Directed by: Chen Jialin; Wu Jiatai
- Starring: Anthony Wong; Ren Chengwei; Jin Chen; Ke Lan; Yao Gang; Ma Xiaowei; Chen Rui; Xu Min
- Opening theme: "Clouds Roll" (云飞扬) by Han Lei
- Ending theme: "An Empire for a Lifetime and Love for Ten Thousand Years" (一世江山万年情) by Nalan; "Hide Love at the Bottom of the Heart" (把爱藏心底) by Zheng Lu
- Country of origin: China
- Original language: Mandarin
- No. of episodes: 51

Production
- Producer: Xiong Cheng
- Production locations: Jiaozuo Film and Television City
- Running time: ≈45 minutes per episode
- Production companies: Beijing CCTV Splendid Film and TV Corporation

Original release
- Release: 27 November 2012

Chu Han Zhengxiong (楚汉争雄) is a Chinese historical drama television series directed by Chen Jialin, and based on the historical novel of the same title by Xiong Cheng (熊誠). It follows the events of the Chu–Han Contention, an interregnum between the fall of the Qin dynasty and the founding of the Han dynasty in Chinese history. Shooting for the series started in October 2011 at the Jiaozuo Film and Television City. It was released in China on 27 November 2012.

== Synopsis ==
The series is set in the late third century BC in China. Xiang Yu, a warrior descended from an aristocratic family, and Liu Bang, a low-ranking government official of humble origin, are both men of great ambition. Their paths cross when they both join the rebellion to overthrow the oppressive Qin dynasty.

Xiang Yu leads the rebels to victory over Qin forces at the decisive Battle of Julu despite the overwhelming odds. Meanwhile, Liu Bang leads his followers to capture the Qin capital Xianyang, ending the Qin dynasty.

A power struggle, historically known as the Chu–Han Contention, breaks out between Xiang Yu and Liu Bang as they fight for supremacy over China. Xiang Yu, though having the upper hand initially, gradually loses to Liu Bang and ultimately takes his own life after making a last stand at the Battle of Gaixia. The victorious Liu Bang becomes the emperor and establishes the Han dynasty as China's ruling dynasty.

== Cast ==
- Ren Chengwei as Xiang Yu
- Anthony Wong as Liu Bang
- Gina Jin as Consort Yu
- Ke Lan as Lü Zhi
- Yao Gang as Han Xin
- Ma Xiaowei as Zhang Liang
- Chen Rui as Xiao He
- Xu Min as Fan Zeng
- Li Bo as Chen Ping
- Zhong Weihua as Xiang Bo
- Yan Jie as Xiang Zhuang
- Zheng Shiming as Ying Bu
- Ni Tu as Long Ju
- Jiang Nan as Ji Bu
- Ying Jun as Zhongli Mo
- Yang Fengyu as Yu Ziqi
- Han Dong as Fan Kuai
- Duan Weiping as Xiahou Ying
- Zhang Jinhe as Yong Chi
- Han Xiao as Cao Shen
- Wang Yansu as Concubine Qi
- Wu Ma as Huang Shigong
- Li Yeqing as Qin E
- Guan Huiqing as Yun'er
- Kou Shixun as Qin Shi Huang
- Guo Kaimin as Li Si
- Shi Xiaoman as Zhao Gao
