= Candle in the Tomb: Mu Ye Gui Shi =

2017 Chinese web series

- Also known as: Ghost Blows Out the Light: Mu Ye Gui Shi
- Genre: Action, Adventure, Mystery, Supernatural, Thriller
- Based on: Ghost Blows Out the Light by Zhang Muye
- Written by: Xin Shengtang
- Directed by: Zhao Xiaoou; Zhao Xiaoxi
- Starring: Darren Wang; Gina Jin; Wang Yuexin; Zhang Boyu; Zhang Xin
- Country of origin: China
- Original language: Chinese
- No. of episodes: 24

Production
- Running time: 40 minutes
- Production companies: iQiyi; Up Pictures; Huayi Brothers

Original release
- Network: iQiyi
- Release: 3 July 2017

Ghost Blows Out the Light: Mu Ye Gui Shi (Chinese: 鬼吹灯之牧野诡事), alternatively known as Ghost Blows Out the Light: Finding Hu Bayi, is a 2017 Chinese web series adapted from the novel series Ghost Blows Out the Light by Zhang Muye. Zhang also acts as the series' executive producer. The series aired via iQiyi every Monday and Tuesday at 20:00 (CST) starting 3 July 2017.

Unlike other adaptations of the same franchise which centers on the novels' main protagonist Hu Bayi, the series is revolved around his son, Hu Tian. This drama has a 2.9 rating on Douban.

== Synopsis ==
Hu Tian is a 25-year-old delinquent leading a carefree life with Xiao Jin Ya, whom he considers to be like a sister. One day, a mysterious woman named Bing Lun appears with news of his long-lost parents, who disappeared more than 20 years ago. A man named Lei Li also appears and claims to be a friend of his father. Along with his new-found friends, Hu Tian sets out on an expedition to find his long-lost family; while figuring out how to differentiate friend and foes.

== Cast ==
- Darren Wang as Hu Tian
  - An orphan who seeks his birth secret. He is experienced in the arts of feng shui, as well as the skill of flying dagger claws. He is the leader and "soul" of the team, but his playful nature makes him seem otherwise.
- Gina Jin as Bing Lun
  - She possesses highly skilled martial arts, and is the "brain" and strategist of the team.
- Wang Yuexin as Lei Li
  - The healer of the team. He has an unpredictable nature.
- Zhang Boyu as Wang Yao
  - Hu Tian's childhood friend. A loyal and generous man.
- Zhang Xin as Xiao Jinya
  - Hu Tian's childhood friend, whom he regards as a sister. She is playful, daring and likes cheap thrills.
- Li Shipeng as Wang Kaixuan (Fatty Wang)
  - Father of Wang Yao, Good friend of Hu Bayi and Shirley Yang. He is Tomb explorer and member of the Mojin.
- Hu Hu as Yang Zhigang
- Ceng Mengxue as Deity Eyes
- Xu Yi as Shan Banshan Qinxue
- Gao Yiqing as Hu Bayi
  - Father of Hu Tian, husband of Shirley Yang. He is Tomb explorer and member of the Mojin.
- Liu Yuqi as Shirley Yang
  - Mother of Hu Tian and wife of Hu Bayi. She is Tomb explorer and member of the Mojin.
- Kang Han-na as Li Ruohua
