= Kidnapping Game =

- Promotional poster
- Traditional Chinese: 十日遊戲
- Simplified Chinese: 十日游戏
- Literal meaning: Ten Day Game
- Hanyu Pinyin: Shí Rì Yóuxì
- Genre: Suspense; Crime; Romance
- Based on: Kidnapping Game by Keigo Higashino
- Written by: Wang Mu; Zhang Tianyi; Zhou Qiao
- Directed by: Zang Xichuan
- Starring: Zhu Yawen; Gina Jin
- Country of origin: China
- Original language: Mandarin
- No. of episodes: 12

Production
- Executive producers: Sun Xiaoyu; Yu Jingjing
- Producers: Wang Xiaohui; Wu Bai
- Camera setup: Multi-camera
- Running time: 45 minutes
- Production company: iQiyi

Original release
- Network: iQiyi
- Release: June 2 – June 11, 2020

Kidnapping Game (Chinese: 十日游戏; pinyin: Shí Rì Yóuxì) is a 2020 Chinese streaming television series that premiered on iQiyi on June 2, 2020. It is directed by Zang Xichuan, and stars Zhu Yawen, Gina Jin, Geng Le and Liu Yijun. It is adapted from Keigo Higashino's detective thriller with the same name. It is the first drama as part of iQiyi's Mist Theater (迷雾剧场), followed by The Bad Kids.

== Synopsis ==
Yu Hai (Zhu Yawen), an owner of a game cafe, is suddenly divested by Shen Hui (Liu Yijun). He accidentally meets Shen Hui's illegitimate daughter Lu Jie (Gina Jin) and the two conspire the fake "kidnapping" of Lu Jie as revenge against the cruel businessman. The two fall in love, but after they successfully receive the ransom, they part. Days later, Lu Jie is found dead, and Yu Hai must find the truth behind her murder.

== Cast ==
- Zhu Yawen as Yu Hai
- Gina Jin as Lu Jie (Shen Yun)
- Liu Yijun as Shen Hui
  - Han Minglin as young Shen Hui
- Geng Le as Wu Yuke
- Ni Dahong as Tian Peng
  - Zhang Cheng as young Tian Peng
- Sarina as Yu Hai's mother
- Yang Haoyu as Xu Lifeng
  - Li Shengrong as young Xu Lifeng
- Chang Yue as President Gu
- Xing Hanqing as Zhang Bao
- Zhao Chengshun as Han Wei
- Dong Xiangrong as Pan Longlong
- Shao Shengjie as Lu Guangxin
- Zhao Bin as Du Lei
- Zu Qian as Liu Ju
- Fu Yong as Technical Branch Senior Officer
- Feng Xuanyi as Han Chufan
- Zang Bochen as Gao Li
- An Baiyi as Li Wen
- Xia Zhenyan as Gu Man
- Xu Zihan as Xiao Yuhai

== Soundtrack ==
No.	Title	Lyrics	Music	Singer	Length
1.	"The Lost Love (消失的爱)" (Theme song)	Dai Yuedong, Ka Lian	Li Zhi Shenglin	Zhu Xingdong
2.	"Emotional Game (感情游戏)" (Ending song)	Dai Yuedong, Ka Lian	Li Zhi Shenglin	Xu Yina

== Reception ==
Kidnapping Game currently earns a 7.5 on Douban with more than 43,000 user reviews.
