= Teen Cop =

Upcoming film by Yang Joon-ho

- Hangul: 고딩형사
- Lit.: High School Detective
- RR: Goding hyeongsa
- MR: Koding hyŏngsa
- Directed by: Yang Joon-ho
- Starring: Kim Hye-yoon; Yoon Kyung-ho
- Production companies: Sanai Pictures; Bound Entertainment; Story Rooftop
- Distributed by: Next Entertainment World
- Release date: 2027
- Country: South Korea
- Language: Korean

Teen Cop (Korean: 고딩형사) is an upcoming South Korean action comedy film directed by Yang Joon-ho and starring Kim Hye-yoon and Yoon Kyung-ho. The film centers on a young-appearing undercover detective and an older-appearing high school student who are compelled to work together. The two collaborate to investigate a mysterious hit-and-run incident that takes place at the high school.

== Cast ==
- Yoon Kyung-ho as Kyu-jin, an older-appearing high school student who gets mistaken for an undercover detective.
- Kim Hye-yoon as Detective Hee-yeon, a young-appearing cop who goes undercover at the high school.
- Kang Han-na
- Zo Zazz
- Yoo Su-bin
- Keum Dong-hyun
- Lee Seo-hwan

== Production ==
=== Development ===
Content media group Next Entertainment World (NEW) confirmed that it would handle the investment and distribution for the film. Teen Cop would mark the feature directorial debut of Yang Joon-ho, who previously served as an assistant director on New World (2013). The film was co-produced by Sanai Pictures, Bound Entertainment, and Story Rooftop, and entered post-production ahead of its introduction to international buyers at the Asian Contents & Film Market (ACFM) in Busan. Garage Lab served as unit shoot team.

The script reading took place on March 10, 2026.

=== Casting ===
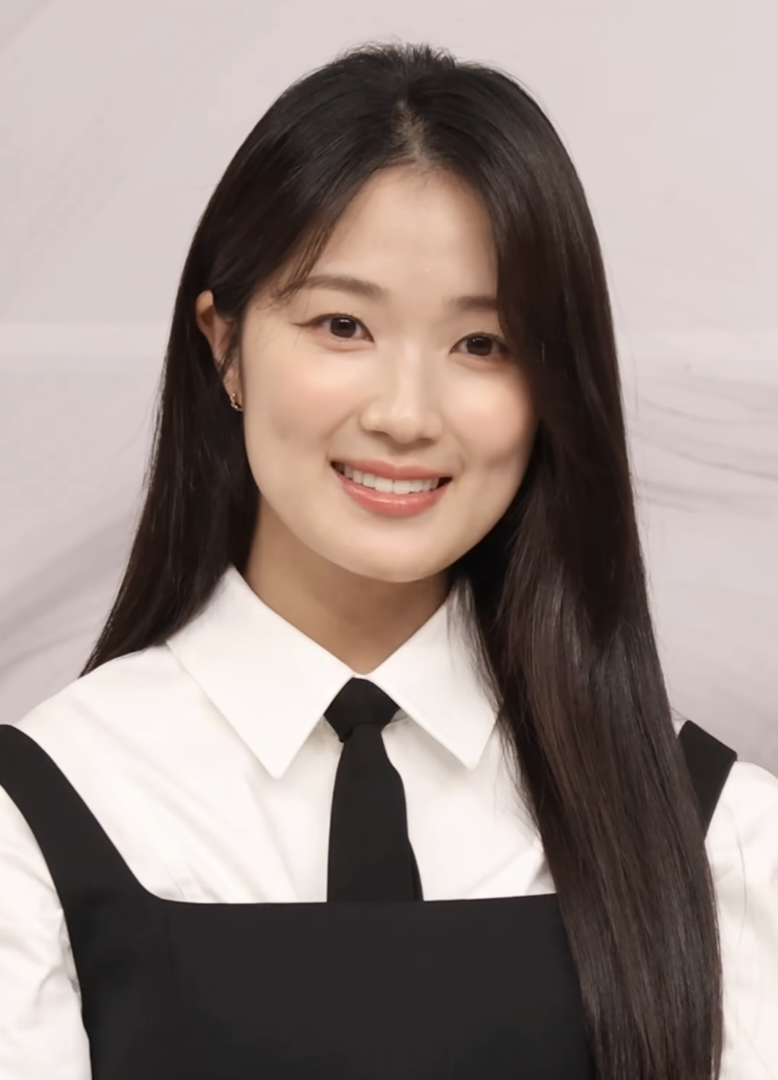
Kim Hye-yoon (L) and Yoon Kyung-ho (R)

Yoon Kyung-ho and Kim Hye-yoon were cast to lead the film in December 2025. Following this, some netizens predicted that Kim would play the high school student and Yoon the detective. The casting reversal, with Yoon portraying a mature-looking student and Kim portraying an undercover detective, attracted considerable attention on South Korean online forums. In February 2026, Ryujin received an offer and was reviewing it. The next month, Kang Han-na was cast, while Zo Zazz and Yoo Su-bin were considering it. In April 2026, Keum Dong-hyun and Lee Seo-hwan joined the cast. Keum's character would be a pivotal role in the case that drives the plot.

=== Filming ===
Principal photography commenced on March 17, 2026.

== Release ==
Next Entertainment World announced that Teen Cop is scheduled for release in the first quarter of 2027.
