= Lady Tan's Circle of Women =

2023 historical novel by Lisa See

- Author: Lisa See
- Language: English
- Publisher: Simon & Schuster
- Publication date: June 6, 2023

Lady Tan's Circle of Women is a 2023 historical novel written by Lisa See. It is inspired by the true story of Tan Yunxian, a woman physician from 15th-century China.

== Synopsis ==
Yunxian begins the novel as the sheltered eight-year-old daughter of a wealthy and prominent scholarly family from Wuxi. Her mother dies after her bound feet are infected, and the siblings are sent to live with their paternal grandparents in their large compound, the Mansion of Golden Light. Grandfather Tan and Grandmother Ru are trained physicians, and Ru decides to pass on her women's medicine to her granddaughter. Yunxian also forms a close friendship with Shi Meiling, the daughter of a local midwife, and is betrothed to Yang Maoren, the son of a prominent merchant family.

When Yunxian is fifteen, she marries into the Yang family. Despite being cut off from the Tans and Meiling, isolated by the rest of the wives and concubines, and her tense relationship with her mother-in-law Lady Kuo, she maintains her interest in medicine and covertly treats a concubine's daughter. Yunxian becomes pregnant at the same time as Miss Chou, a concubine of Maoren's father. Miss Chou bears a son named Manzi, but Yunxian has a difficult breech birth that neither the family's favored midwife nor their family doctor Doctor Wong is able to treat; eventually Meiling is summoned and successfully delivers Yunxian's daughter. The two begin to repair their friendship. Shortly after the birth, Yunxian finds a great-aunt referred to as Spinster Aunt dead in a pond, prompting an inquest. The death is ruled an accident. Yunxian falls ill and is cared for by her natal family; Grandfather Tan also negotiates for better treatment for her in exchange for imperial connections for Maoren. Meiling becomes the midwife used by the Yangs.

By the time Yunxian is twenty-nine, she has birthed three daughters and no sons. The family is visited by a high-ranking official from Beijing, whose wife Lady Liu and mother Widow Bao have heard of Yunxian's reputation as a woman doctor. Yunxian successfully treats the official's ailing sister in Nanjing. After the ladies observe Meiling's treatment of a young wife, Meiling is brought to the Forbidden City to be a midwife.

Later, Yunxian is also summoned to the Forbidden City despite being pregnant. It is revealed that Yunxian and Meiling are to assist Empress Zhang as she gives birth. The empress successfully bears a son, but Meiling suffers a miscarriage in the process. Despite this being perceived as a grievous offense to the royal family, the empress, Yunxian, and the other women successfully appeal to lower her sentence to a whipping. Yunxian also gives birth to a boy she nicknames Lian. As she recovers on the journey home, Meiling confides that she had stolen a formula prescribed for Yunxian by Doctor Wong, supposedly to have a successful birth. Yunxian questions this as the formula contained abortifacients.

The women arrive back in Wuxi to find that a smallpox outbreak has ravaged the city, with several members of the Yang family being affected. Entrusting her son's care to Lady Kuo, Yunxian manages to save several lives with the aid of Miss Chou and Grandmother Ru. However, Miss Chou's son dies in the outbreak and she is sold away. Yunxian realizes that Manzi is likely Doctor Wong's son, and that the doctor had prescribed her the abortifacient in hopes that his own son might lead the Yang clan. He murdered Spinster Aunt, who had realized the truth. An inquest led by Yunxian's father is held confirming this. Lady Kuo finally accepts Yunxian as both a woman doctor and the clan's future matriarch, and Yunxian begins compiling a book of her cases.

Several years later, a middle-aged Yunxian, now a respected physician, attends a festival alongside the Yang clan, Meiling and her son, and her natal family. A postscript by the grandson of Yunxian's half-brother Yifeng reveals that Yunxian outlived both her son and grandson, but was a well-known and respected expert doctor until her death at the age of 96.

== Critical reception ==
News Tribune wrote "But at its heart, "Lady Tan's Circle of Women" is much more than a story about a pioneering doctor. It's a tale of enduring friendship and the effect it can have both in the moment and centuries afterward."
