= Husbands in Action =

2026 film by Park Gyu-tae

- Release poster
- Hangul: 남편들
- Hanja: 男便들
- Lit.: Husbands
- RR: Nampyeondeul
- MR: Namp'yŏndŭl
- Directed by: Park Gyu-tae
- Written by: Park Gyu-tae; Kim Jong-hyun
- Starring: Jin Seon-kyu; Gong Myung; Kim Ji-seok; Yoon Kyung-ho; Kang Han-na; Lee Da-hee
- Production company: TPS Company
- Distributed by: Netflix
- Release date: June 19, 2026
- Running time: 107 minutes
- Country: South Korea
- Language: Korean

Husbands in Action (Korean: 남편들) is a 2026 South Korean action comedy film directed and written by Park Gyu-tae with Kim Jong-hyun as co-writer. It stars Jin Seon-kyu, Gong Myung, Kim Ji-seok, Yoon Kyung-ho, Kang Han-na, and Lee Da-hee. The film follows Choong-sik, the ex-husband, and Min-seok, the new husband of his ex-wife Si-nae, as they cooperate to rescue her after she's kidnapped by a criminal organization. It was released on Netflix on June 19, 2026.

== Synopsis ==
At a school event, narcotics inspector Hwang Choong-sik meets Lee Min-seok, his ex-wife Si-nae's new husband, sparking an immediate power struggle. The veteran investigator and the young veterinarian clash in both personality and family roles, as ex-husband versus new husband and father versus stepfather to their daughter Yeon-ju.

The rivalry ends temporarily when Si-nae and Yeon-ju are abducted, compelling Choong-sik and Min-seok to collaborate on their rescue. Their differing temperaments cause repeated conflicts throughout the operation.

The kidnapping is orchestrated by Do-jun, a drug lord who has become a rising figure in the criminal underworld. His wife Hye-ran, the true mastermind, manipulates the situation by using Si-nae and her daughter as leverage to secure Do-jun’s release.

Meanwhile, Yong-gang, a disgraced drug lord, joins the pursuit to eliminate Do-jun and regain control. Journalist A-ra further complicates matters after developing an interest in Choong-sik.

== Cast ==
- Jin Seon-kyu as Hwang Choong-sik, a narcotics inspector who is Si-nae's ex-husband
- Gong Myung as Lee Min-seok, a veterinary and Si-nae's husband
- Kim Ji-seok as Ma Do-jun, a drug lord
- Yoon Kyung-ho as Kim Yong-gang
- Kang Han-na as Si-nae
- Lee Da-hee as Hye-ran, Do-jun's wife who kidnapped Si-nae
- Jeon So-min as Jo A-ra, a journalist
- Oh Eun-seo as Hwang Yeon-ju, Choong-sik and Si-nae's daughter
- Lim Yoona as Kim Yong-gang's wife

== Production ==
The action comedy film Husbands in Action is directed and written by Park Gyu-tae, who helmed 6/45 (2022), co-written with Kim Jong-hyun, and produced by TPS Company. Casting announcements began in late March 2025, and it was reported that Gong Myung, Kang Han-na, and Jin Seon-kyu were considering roles. Two months later, Netflix officially confirmed the appearances of the three actors, including Kim Ji-seok, Yoon Kyung-ho, and Lee Da-hee. It marks the second collaboration between Jin and Gong following the film Extreme Job (2019).

== Release ==
Netflix confirmed Husbands in Action was scheduled to be released in the second quarter of 2026 as part of its annual Korean contents lineup. By May 2026, the film was confirmed for release on June 19.
