= Empress Wang (Jingtai) =

Empress of China from 1449 to 1452

Empress Xiaoyuanjing 孝淵景皇后

Empress consort of the Ming dynasty
- Tenure: 22 September 1449 – May 1452
- Predecessor: Empress Xiaozhuangrui
- Successor: Empress Suxiao
- Born: 1427; Shuntian
- Died: 1506 (aged 78–79)
- Burial: Jingtai Mausoleum
- Spouse: Jingtai Emperor (m. 1449; dep. 1457)
- Issue: Princess Gu'an; Second daughter
Posthumous name
- Empress Xiaoyuan Suyi Zhenhui Anhe Futian Gongsheng Jing (孝淵肅懿貞惠安和輔天恭聖景皇后)
- Clan: Wang (汪)
- Father: Wang Ying (汪瑛)

Empress Wang (1427–1507) was a Chinese empress consort of the Ming dynasty, married to the Jingtai Emperor.

Wang was married to Jingtai in 1449. When the elder brother of Jingtai was taken prisoner by the Mongols later that year, Jingtai became emperor, and Wang was given the position of empress by his side. Empress Wang had two daughters with the emperor, but no son. In May 1452, Jingtai declared the son of his secondary Consort Hang heir to the throne. At the same time, he promoted Hang to the position of empress, being the mother of the crown prince, and demoted Wang and stripped her of the title.

After her demotion, the ex-empress Wang lived a quiet life outside of the palace walls. She survived the deposition and death of Jingtai in 1457, when the rest of his concubines and spouses were ordered to commit suicide. The reason for this was possibly because she had assisted the nephew of her spouse, the future Chenghua Emperor, to hide from Jingtai.

== Titles ==
- During the reign of Xuande Emperor (r. 1425–1435):
  - Lady Wang (汪氏; from 1427)
- During the reign of the Zhengtong Emperor (r. 1435–1449):
  - Princess of Cheng (郕王妃; from 1445)
- During the reign of the Jingtai Emperor (r. 1449–1457):
  - Empress (皇后; from 22 September 1449)
- During the reign of the Tianshun Emperor (r. 1457–1464)
  - Princess of Cheng (郕王妃; from 1457)
- During the reign of the Zhengde Emperor (r. 1505–1521):
  - Empress Zhenhui Anhe Jing (贞惠安和景皇后; from 1507)
- During the reign of the Hongguang Emperor (r.1644–1645)
  - Empress Xiaoyuan Suyi Zhenhui Anhe Futian Gongsheng Jing (孝淵肅懿貞惠安和輔天恭聖景皇后; from 1644)

== Issue ==
- As Princess of Cheng:
  - Princess Gu'an (固安郡主; 1449–1491), the Jingtai Emperor's first daughter
  - The Jingtai Emperor's second daughter

== Notes ==
Chinese royalty
Preceded by Empress Xiaozhuangrui	Empress consort of China; 1449–1452	Succeeded by Empress Suxiao
