= Cleaning Up (British TV series) =

British television series

- Promotional poster
- Genre: Drama
- Created by: Mark Marlow
- Written by: Mark Marlow
- Directed by: Lewis Arnold
- Starring: Sheridan Smith; Jade Anouka; Kristy Philipps; Ben Bailey Smith; Uriel Emil
- Music by: Guy Garvey
- Country of origin: United Kingdom
- Original language: English
- No. of series: 1
- No. of episodes: 6

Production
- Executive producers: Jane Featherstone; Chris Fry
- Producer: Karen Lewis
- Cinematography: Ollie Downey
- Running time: 60 minutes (inc. adverts)
- Production company: Sister Pictures

Original release
- Network: ITV
- Release: 9 January – 13 February 2019

Related
- Cleaning Up (South Korean adaptation); Clean (French adaptation)

Cleaning Up is a British television drama series written and created by Mark Marlow. The six-part series premiered on ITV on 9 January 2019. It stars Sheridan Smith as Sam, a single mother and office cleaner who resorts to insider trading in order to pay her debts.

== Plot ==
Sam Cook is a cleaner at Kramer Lowe, a financial company in Canary Wharf. Struggling to get by on her zero-hour contract with contractor Xenco Clean, she is drowning in debt, addicted to gambling, and faces her ex-husband trying to get full-time custody of their two daughters. After overhearing a stockbroker who is being blackmailed into insider trading, she plunges herself into a shady world of finance.

== Cast ==
- Sheridan Smith as Sam Cook, a cleaner for Xenco Clean
- Jade Anouka as Jess, Sam's friend and colleague
- Kristy Philipps as Alice Cook, Sam and Dave's 15-year-old daughter
- Ben Bailey Smith as Blake, a Kramer Lowe stockbroker engaging in insider trading
- Uriel Emil as Viktor, Sam's boss at Xenco Clean
- Robert Emms as Glynn, a lodger at Sam's house
- Branka Katić as Mina, a cleaner for Xenco Clean
- Neil Maskell as Warren, a debt collector that Sam owes money to
- Anya McKenna-Bruce as Lily Cook, Sam and Dave's 8-year-old daughter
- Matthew McNulty as Dave Cook, Sam's ex-husband
- Hero Fiennes-Tiffin as Jake, Alice's boyfriend
- Rosie Cavaliero as Frances Howard, Head of Compliance for Kramer Lowe
- Lloyd Owen as Dominic Swanson, a corporate lawyer blackmailing Blake
- Angela Wynter as Amber, Jess's mother and cafe owner
- Milanka Brooks as Daniela, a cleaner for Xenco Clean
- Con O'Neill as Graham, CEO of Westavaris Incorporated, and head of the insider trading network

== Production ==
Marlow, who had no previous credits in television, had been struggling to get an original series produced. Inspired by Oliver Stone's Wall Street, he developed a script around office cleaners, who are often unnoticed. The script was eventually passed onto Featherstone, who commissioned the programme.

== Episodes ==
No.	Title	Directed by	Written by	Original release date	U.K. viewers (millions)
1	"Episode 1"	Lewis Arnold	Mark Marlow	January 9, 2019	8.68
2	"Episode 2"	Lewis Arnold	Mark Marlow	January 16, 2019	7.69
3	"Episode 3"	Lewis Arnold	Mark Marlow	January 23, 2019	6.98
4	"Episode 4"	Lewis Arnold	Mark Marlow	January 30, 2019	6.51
5	"Episode 5"	Robert McKillop	Mark Marlow	February 6, 2019	6.47
6	"Episode 6"	Robert McKillop	Mark Marlow	February 13, 2019	6.61

== Reception ==
The first episode of Cleaning Up received three out of five stars from The Guardian's Lucy Mangan, who was critical of weak story development but complimentary of the concept and actors, writing that "... overall, this is the kind of solid, well-made nonsense that is such a rare and precious joy. Indispensable to it are the actors, who throw themselves uncynically into it with their whole hearts. This is always Smith's greatest gift, and here she is surrounded by a supporting cast doing likewise."
