= Consort Meng Arrives =

2018 Chinese television series

- Promotional image
- Traditional Chinese: 萌妃駕到
- Simplified Chinese: 萌妃驾到
- Hanyu Pinyin: Méng Fēi Jià Dào
- Genre: Historical fiction Comedy
- Based on: Meng Fei Jia Dao by Lian Qiao
- Written by: Lian Qiao
- Directed by: Zou Jicheng
- Starring: Gina Jin; Jiro Wang
- Opening theme: "Please Don't Love Me, Okay? (别再爱我了好不好)"
- Ending theme: "Paradise in Mortal Realm (人间乐园)"
- Country of origin: China
- Original language: Mandarin
- No. of seasons: 1
- No. of episodes: 36 (45 minutes each)

Production
- Executive producer: Yuan Feiyu
- Production location: Wuxi
- Production company: Beijing Leyang Film

Original release
- Network: Youku
- Release: June 8, 2018

Consort Meng Arrives
- Traditional Chinese: 萌妃駕到
- Simplified Chinese: 萌妃驾到
Transcriptions
Standard Mandarin
- Hanyu Pinyin: Méng Fēi Jià Dào

Consort Meng Arrives (Chinese: 萌妃驾到; pinyin: Méng-fēi Jiàdào; lit. 'Meng-fei Sets Up'), officially known as Mengfei Comes Across, is a 2018 Chinese television starring Gina Jin and Jiro Wang. The series is based on the eponymous novel Meng Fei Jia Dao (萌妃驾到) by Lian Qiao, and set during the Tang Dynasty. The series was broadcast on Youku from 8 June 2018.

== Synopsis ==
A story revolving around the mischievous Concubine Meng who starts out at odds with the Emperor but falls in love with him in the process; as well as her adventures in the palace.

== Cast ==
=== Main ===
- Gina Jin as Bu Meng (萌妃)
- Jiro Wang as Wen Lou

=== Supporting ===
- Xia Yiyao as Consort Yan (言妃)
- Han Jiunuo as Qu Wanwan (曲嫔)
- Mi Na as Noble Lady Xiao (骁贵人)
- Liu Guanlin as Liu Jinyan
- Zhang Haiyu as He Qiliao
- Zhou Bin as Bao Qu
- Liu Weisen as Cai Taixian
- Jia Qingru as Noble Consort Ru (如贵妃)
- Chen Dexiu as Bu Yue
- Chen Jiayan as the Empress Dowager
- Tang Mengjia as Yan'er
- Yang Yunqi as Chunping
- Chen Yao as Pu Liji
- Chi Ningning as Chen Yuanxi
- Yu Siyuan as Concubine Zu (足嫔)
- Wu Jingjing as Concubine Wang (王嫔)
- Zhai Lin as Noble Lady Yi (伊贵人)
- Li Jiawen as Xiaobai
- Ma Ding as Noble Lady Xian (嫌贵人)
- Huang Zixi as Su Ruan
- Zhang Hengyu as Lüliu
- Tang Hao as Fuxi
- Qu Aohui as Zhen Shishuang
- Gao Yuqing as Wu Weiyong

== Soundtrack ==
No.	Title	Lyrics	Music	Singers	Length
1.	"Please Don't Love Me, Okay? (别再爱我了好不好)" (Opening theme song)	Xiao Ke	Xiao Ke	Han Jiunuo
2.	"Paradise in Mortal Realm (人间乐园)" (Ending theme song)	Liu Chang	Tan Xuan	Deng Tongtian & Zhang Wenbo
