= Kang Han-na =

South Korean actress (born 1989)

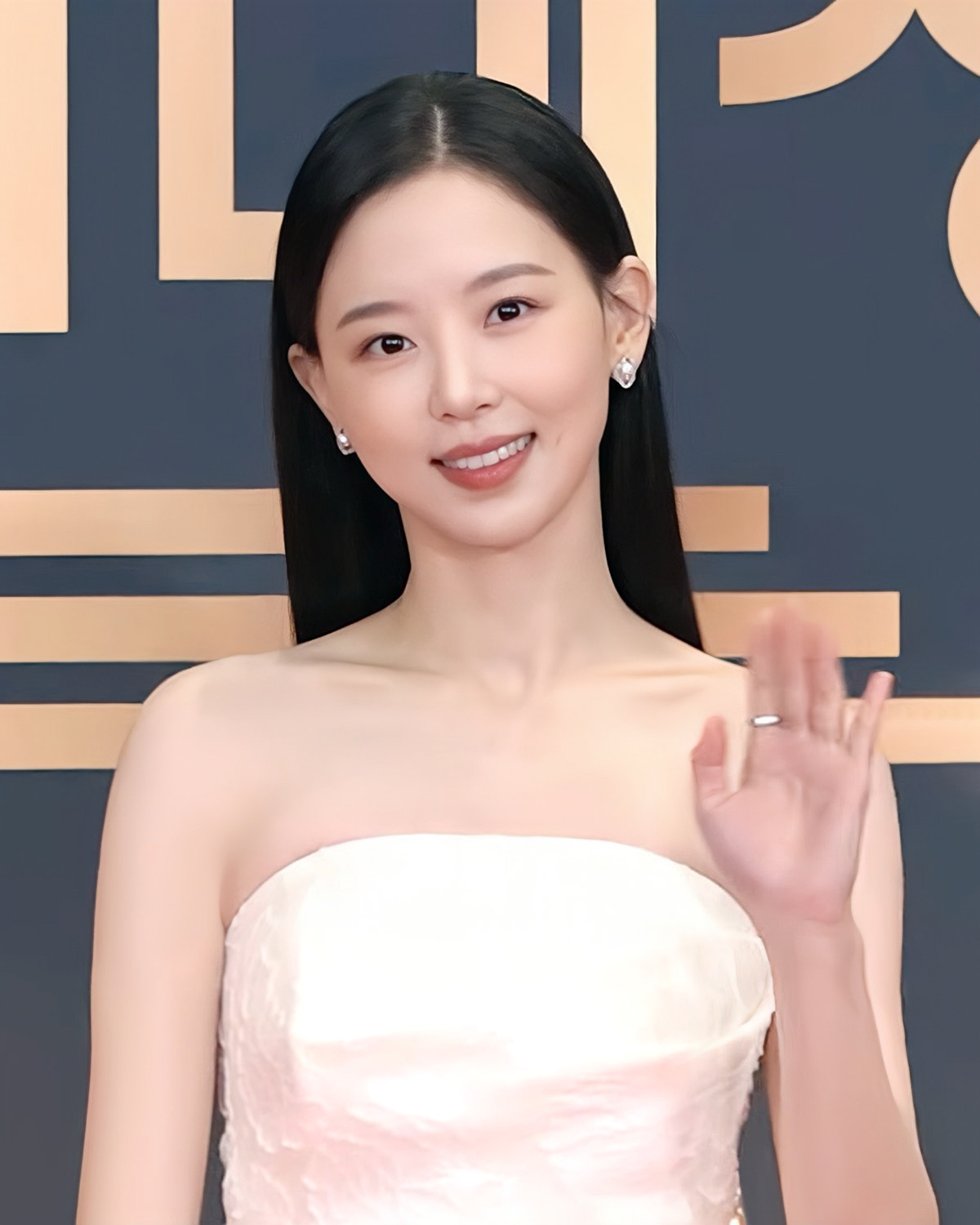
- Kang in 2022
- Born: January 30, 1989 (age 37); Incheon, South Korea
- Education: Chung-Ang University (BA, MA)
- Occupation: Actress
- Years active: 2009–present
- Agent: Beyond J

Korean name
- Hangul: 강한나
- RR: Gang Hanna
- MR: Kang Hanna

Kang Han-na (Korean: 강한나; born January 30, 1989) is a South Korean actress. Kang played several lead roles in films and television series, including Moon Lovers: Scarlet Heart Ryeo (2016), Rain or Shine (2017), Familiar Wife (2018), Start-Up (2020), My Roommate Is a Gumiho (2021), and Bon Appétit, Your Majesty (2025).

== Early life and education ==
Kang received both her Bachelor and Master of Theater from Chung-Ang University.

== Career ==
=== 2009–2015: Career beginnings ===
Kang made her film debut in the short films, Last Homecoming and King of Guitar, both in 2009.

In 2013, she began playing minor roles in mainstream films Fasten Your Seatbelt, Commitment and Friend: The Great Legacy. The same year, Kang made her television debut in the romantic comedy drama Miss Korea.

Kang played her first lead role in the period film Empire of Lust in 2015, playing a gisaeng. She then starred in the short film, Stand in the same year.

=== 2016–present: Rising popularity ===
Kang rose to fame with her role as an evil queen in the historical drama Moon Lovers: Scarlet Heart Ryeo. She was nominated for the "Excellence Award, Actress in a Fantasy Drama" at the 2016 SBS Drama Awards and "Best New Actress" at the 53rd Baeksang Arts Awards.

Kang was then cast in the romance melodrama Rain or Shine in 2017. The same year, she played a minor role in the Chinese drama Candle in the Tomb: Mu Ye Gui Shi.

In 2018, she starred in the romance comedy drama Familiar Wife.

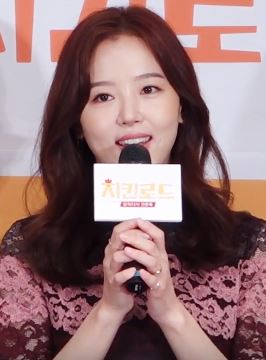
Kang in October 2019

In 2019, Kang was cast in the thriller drama Designated Survivor: 60 Days, based on the American series Designated Survivor. The same year she starred in a short drama of Drama Stage titled Woman with a Bleeding Ear about a woman who one day starts bleeding from her ears when she hears something she doesn't want to hear.

She was also confirmed to take over Volume Up as a new DJ starting from January 6, 2020.

In 2020, Kang starred in the tvN drama Start-Up as a successful businesswoman. In October 2020, Kang's contract with Fantagio ended and she signed with KeyEast.

In 2021, Kang starred in My Roommate Is a Gumiho.

In 2022, Kang was cast in KBS2's historical drama series Bloody Heart alongside Lee Joon. In the drama directed by Yoo Young-eun, Kang played the role of Yoo Jeong.

In August 2025, Kang left KeyEast and signed with new agency Beyond J.

In 2026, Kang reunited with the Yoo Young-eun and Kim Seon-ho for a special appearance in Netflix original series Can This Love Be Translated? A romantic comedy that follows the relationship between Joo Ho-jin (Kim Seon-ho), a multilingual interpreter, and Cha Mu-hee (Go Youn-jung), a top actress. Kang and Lee Joon acted as a couple. They used the same name with their character in Bloody Heart.

== Endorsements ==
Kang was named a brand muse for Suiskin in September 2016. In November 2017, she appeared in Uniqlo's fall-winter "Warm Pants" campaign. In November 2020, she was selected as the first exclusive representative for Birdview's Yeoshin Ticket. In April 2021, she became a brand ambassador for Bioderma. She was appointed the exclusive representative for Shinwon Corporation's SI in February 2026.

== Filmography ==
=== Film ===
Year	Title	Role	Notes	Ref.
2009	Last Homecoming	Seon-young	Short film	
2009	King of Guitar	Young-jin	Short film	
2011	Coming Out	Jeong-woo	Short film	
2013	Fasten Your Seatbelt	Mary		
2013	Commitment	Waffle house's part-time staff		
2013	Friend: The Great Legacy	Ah-ram		
2014	No Tears for the Dead	Kindergarten teacher		
2015	Empire of Lust	Ga-hee		
2015	Informality	Female student voice	Short film	
2015	Stand	Kang Han-na	Short film	
2024	About Family	Han Ga-yeon		
2026	Husbands in Action	Si-nae		

=== Television series ===
Year	Title	Role	Note(s)	Ref.
2013–2014	Miss Korea	Im Seon-joo		
2015	To Be Continued	Teacher		
2015–2016	My Mom	Kang Yoo-ra		
2016	Secret Healer	Queen Park	Cameo (episodes 17–19)	
2016	Moon Lovers: Scarlet Heart Ryeo	Princess Hwangbo Yeon-hwa		
2017	Rain or Shine	Jung Yoo-jin		
2018	Familiar Wife	Lee Hye-won		
2019	Designated Survivor: 60 Days	Han Na-gyeong		
2019	Drama Stage – "Woman with a Bleeding Ear"	Kim Soo-hee		
2020	Record of Youth	Jessica	Cameo (episode 9)	
2020	Start-Up	Won In-jae / Seo In-jae		
2021	My Roommate Is a Gumiho	Yang Hye-sun		
2022	Bloody Heart	Yoo Jeong		
2024	Frankly Speaking	On Woo-joo		
2025	Bon Appetit, Your Majesty	Kang Mok-ju		
TBA	Embassy for Foreign Monsters in Korea	Yoo Hye-rang		

=== Web series ===
Year	Title	Role	Ref.
2017	Candle in the Tomb: Mu Ye Gui Shi	Li Ruohua	
2021	Bite Sisters	Han Yi-na	
2025	Cashero	Jo An-na	

=== Television shows ===
Year	Title	Ref.
2019	In Search of Lost Time	
2019	Hon-Life: Satisfaction Project	
2020	Shall We Write Love? The Romance	

=== Web shows ===
Year	Title	Role	Ref.
2025	Better Late Than Single	Host/Cupid	

=== Radio ===
Year	Title	Notes	Ref.
2020–2021	Kang Han-na's Volume Up	January 6, 2020 to October 31, 2021	

== Awards and nominations ==
Name of the award ceremony, year presented, category, nominee of the award, and the result of the nomination
Award ceremony	Year	Category	Nominee / Work	Result	Ref.
Baeksang Arts Awards	2017	Best New Actress – Television	Moon Lovers: Scarlet Heart Ryeo	Nominated	
KBS Drama Awards	2022	Best Couple	Kang Han-na (with Lee Joon); Bloody Heart	Won	
KBS Drama Awards	2022	Excellence Award, Actress in a Miniseries	Bloody Heart	Won	
KBS Drama Awards	2022	Top Excellence Award, Actress	Bloody Heart	Nominated	
KBS Entertainment Awards	2020	New DJ of the Year Award	Kang Han-na's Volume Up	Won	
SBS Drama Awards	2016	Excellence Award, Actress in a Fantasy Drama	Moon Lovers: Scarlet Heart Ryeo	Nominated	
SBS Entertainment Awards	2018	Best Challenge Award	Running Man	Nominated	
