= Jade Spring Hill =

Mountain and private villa complex northwest of Beijing

Coordinates: 39.9925°N 116.2425°E

- 玉泉山 (Chinese)
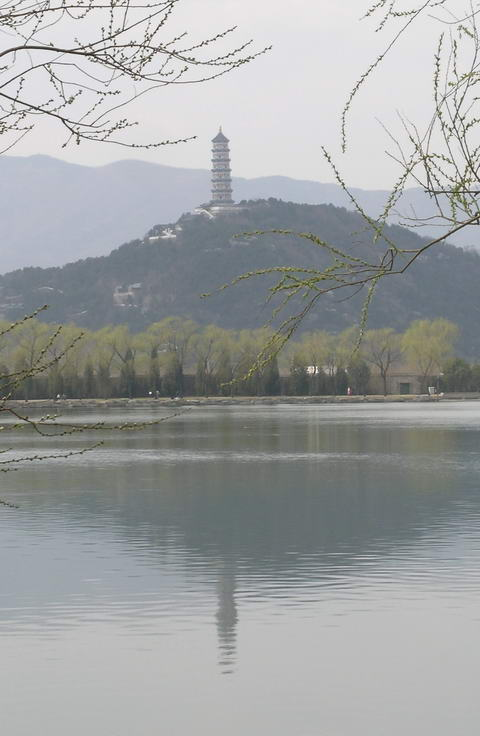
- Yufeng Pagoda
- Interactive map of Jade Spring Hill

History
- Built: Circa.1680

Jade Spring Hill (Chinese: 玉泉山; pinyin: Yùquán Shān) is located to the west of the Summer Palace in Beijing, China. It was also formerly known as Jingming Palace (景明宫, "Jǐngmíng gōng"). It contains an imperial garden, the Jingming Garden and is named after the Jade Spring. It is the location of the Xiangji Temple, the Yufeng Pagoda, the Jinxing Palace and the Furong Palace. Jade Spring Hill reportedly hosts the private villas of high-ranking members of the Chinese Communist Party (CCP)'s Central Military Commission (CMC) and People's Liberation Army (PLA). Entry is forbidden for non-residents and the area remains under tight security at all times.

Jade Spring Hill has been called the "back garden" of Chinese politics (in contrast to the official political compound of Zhongnanhai) because so many influential leaders reportedly have residences in the area. Several of the most recent CCP general secretaries, including Jiang Zemin, Hu Jintao, and Xi Jinping reportedly have been assigned houses in Jade Spring Hill.

== Jade Spring ==
Jade Spring is a site located at the southern foot of Jade Spring Hill, named the "greatest spring in the world" by the Qianlong Emperor (r. 1735–1796) of the Qing dynasty. Yuquan Spouting Spring of eight scenery of Peking.

After the Ming dynasty established its capital in Beijing, Jade Spring was used for royal purposes, and its water was transported from Jade Spring Hill around Xizhimen Gate to the imperial palace by cart.

== Jingming Garden ==
In 1680 during the reign of the Kangxi Emperor, Chengxin Garden was constructed on the south slope of the hill, later renamed Jingming Garden. Jingming Garden is one of five imperial gardens in the northwest of Beijing.

== Notable residents ==
- Xi Jinping
- Wu Guanzheng
- Yu Zhengsheng
- Zeng Qinghong
- Zhang Youxia
