= Jingming Garden =

Imperial garden in Beijing, China

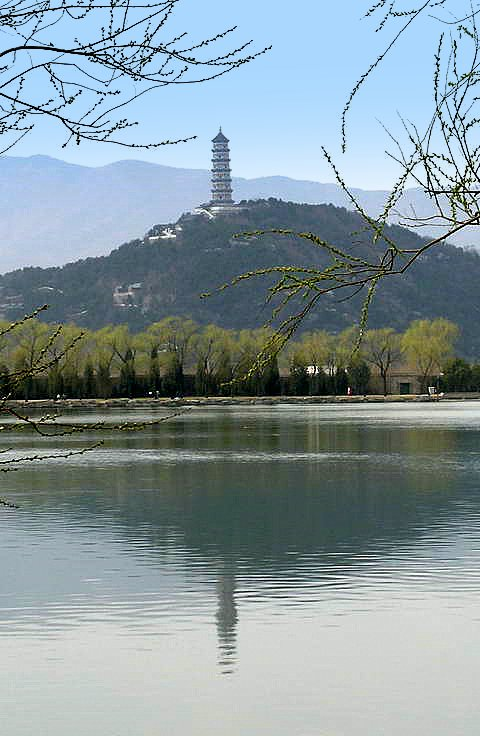
Jingming Garden

Jingming Garden (simplified Chinese: 静明园; traditional Chinese: 靜明園) is an imperial garden on the Jade Spring Hill in Beijing, China, west of the Summer Palace. It is a Major Historical and Cultural Site Protected at the National Level.

== History ==
Jingming Garden was first built in the Jurchen Jin dynasty and also called Lotus Palace (Furong Palace) and Jade Spring Pavilion.

Yanhua Temple was built in the Zhengde era of the Ming dynasty.

The Clean Heart Garden was built in the 19th year of the Kangxi reign of the Qing dynasty and renamed as Jingming Garden in the 31st year of Kangxi.

It was burned down by the Anglo-French Allied Force and the Eight-Nation Alliance in 1860 and 1900 respectively. It became Jade Spring Hill Water Company after the Revolution of 1911 and was opened to the public.

After the People's Republic of China was founded, Jingming Garden was the summer retreat of national leaders and was renovated. The plan to arrest the Gang of Four was formulated here.

Jingming Garden is a Beijing cultural relics protection unit. It was listed in the 6th batch of National Key Cultural Relic Protection Unit by the State Council on 25 May 2006.

== Features ==
- Jade Spring was named "the best spring in the world" by Qianlong Emperor. Spouting Jade Spring is one of Eight scenery of Peking.
- Jade Hill Tower is in the main peak of Jade Spring Hill. It is an octagonal seven steps wood-like stone tower with height 47.7 meter, which well known by one of sixty scenery "Jade Hill Tower Shadow".
- Huazang Tower is an octagonal seven steps dense eaves type white marble stone tower.
- Chengzhao Pass was crenelation connected with the height beyond 6 meter.
- Lanka Cave is a cave with esoteric buddhism bas-reliefs on precipices with high artistic value.
