= Cleaning Up (South Korean TV series) =

2022 South Korean television series

- Promotional poster
- Hangul: 클리닝 업
- RR: Keullining eop
- MR: K'ŭllining ŏp
- Based on: Cleaning Up by Mark Mallow
- Written by: Choi Kyung-mi
- Directed by: Yoon Seong-sik
- Starring: Yum Jung-ah; Jeon So-min; Kim Jae-hwa; Lee Moo-saeng; Na In-woo
- Music by: Gaemi
- Country of origin: South Korea
- Original language: Korean
- No. of episodes: 16

Production
- Executive producer: Lee Se-young
- Producers: Park Jun-seo; Kim So-jang
- Production companies: Drama House; SLL

Original release
- Network: JTBC
- Release: June 4 – July 24, 2022

Cleaning Up (Korean: 클리닝 업; RR: Keullining eop) is a South Korean television series based on the 2019 British series of the same name, starring Yum Jung-ah, Jeon So-min, and Kim Jae-hwa. It aired on JTBC from June 4 to July 24, 2022, every Saturday and Sunday at 22:30 (KST) for 16 episodes.

== Synopsis ==
Cleaning Up tells the story of three cleaners: Eo Yong-mi (Yum Jung-ah), Ahn In-kyung (Jeon So-min), and Maeng Soo-ja (Kim Jae-hwa) at a financial company who resort to insider trading, in order to feed their family and fulfil their dreams, after accidentally overhearing a piece of financial information.

== Cast ==
=== Main ===
- Yum Jung-ah as Eo Yong-mi
- Jeon So-min as Ahn In-kyung
- Kim Jae-hwa as Maeng Soo-ja
- Lee Moo-saeng as Lee Young-shin
- Na In-woo as Lee Doo-yeong

=== Supporting ===
==== Persons related to investment securities ====
- Jang Shin-young as Geum Jan-di
- Song Jae-hee as Yoon Tae-kyung
- Song Young-chang as Song Woo-chang

==== People around Eo Young-mi ====
- Kim Tae-woo as Jin Seong-woo
- Yoon Kyung-ho as Oh Dong-ju
- Kal So-won as Jin Yun-ah
- Hae-eun as Boo So-yeon
- Kim Si-ha as Jin Xi-ah
- Gil Hae-yeon as Bo-ran
- Jeon Kook-hyang as Jang Kyung-ja
- Yoon Jin-ho as Eo Yong-gyu

==== People around Maeng Soo-ja ====
- Go In-beom as Jung Sa-jang
- Kwon Ji-woo as Jung Geun-woo

==== People around Ahn In-kyung ====
- Oh Seung-yoon as Byeong Ryul

==== Investment & Securities Service Cleaning Team ====
- Kim In-kwon as Cheon Deok-gyu
- Park Ji-a as Seok-soon
- Kim Na-yul as Hye-sook
- Son Jeong-rim as Bok-gi
- Hwang Jung-min as Geum-sil

=== Extended ===
- Ha Shi-eun as Boo So-yeon
- Lee Tae-gum as Park Seong-gyu

=== Special appearances ===
- Kim Hye-yoon as Joo-hyeon
- Yoo Young-jae as Yongmi's nephew
- Cha Chung-hwa as Dongseo
- Kim Hye-hwa as Song Mi-hwa

== Viewership ==
Cleaning Up : South Korea viewers per episode (thousands)

Season	Episode number																Average
Season	1	2	3	4	5	6	7	8	9	10	11	12	13	14	15	16	Average
1	619	566	498	611	407	640	N/A	492	438	566	574	562	428	585	424	698	507

Source: Audience measurement performed nationwide by Nielsen Korea. (Note: Due to one audience measurement not published, the exact average audience measurement is unknown.)

Average TV viewership ratings
Ep.	Original broadcast date	Average audience share (Nielsen Korea)	
Ep.	Original broadcast date	Nationwide	Seoul
1	June 4, 2022	2.737% (3rd)	3.084% (2nd)
2	June 5, 2022	2.514% (5th)	2.267% (4th)
3	June 11, 2022	2.322% (4th)	2.687% (3rd)
4	June 12, 2022	2.570% (4th)	2.500% (4th)
5	June 18, 2022	1.986% (6th)	1.893% (9th)
6	June 19, 2022	2.820% (2nd)	2.350% (3rd)
7	June 25, 2022	2.018% (12th)	N/A
8	June 26, 2022	2.236% (5th)	1.874% (9th)
9	July 2, 2022	2.125% (7th)	N/A
10	July 3, 2022	2.787% (3rd)	2.228% (4th)
11	July 9, 2022	2.478% (8th)	2.149% (9th)
12	July 10, 2022	2.566% (5th)	2.147% (8th)
13	July 16, 2022	1.973% (12th)	N/A
14	July 17, 2022	2.505% (7th)	1.979% (10th)
15	July 23, 2022	1.912% (10th)	1.747% (9th)
16	July 24, 2022	3.015% (4nd)	2.257% (6th)
Average		2.410%	1.823% (Note: This average ratings is calculated based on the published ratings, the exact average ratings is unknown due to multiple ratings not published.)
In the table above, the blue numbers represent the lowest published ratings and the red numbers represent the highest published ratings.; N/A denotes ratings that was not released.; This drama airs on a cable channel/pay TV which normally has a relatively smaller audience compared to free-to-air TV/public broadcasters (KBS, SBS, MBC, and EBS).
