= Empress Hang =

Empress of China from 1452 to 1456

Empress Suxiao 肅孝皇后

Empress consort of the Ming dynasty
- Tenure: 1452–1456
- Predecessor: Empress Wang
- Successor: Empress Xiaozhuangrui
- Died: 1456
- Burial: Shou Mausoleum
- Spouse: Jingtai Emperor
- Issue: Zhu Jianji, Crown Prince Huaixian
Posthumous name
- Empress Suxiao (肅孝皇后)
- Clan: Hang (杭)
- Father: Hang Yu (杭昱)

Empress Hang (肅孝皇后; d. 1456) was a Chinese empress consort of the Ming dynasty, married to the Jingtai Emperor.

Hang was originally a concubine of Jingtai. When the elder brother of Jingtai was taken prisoner by the Mongols in 1449, Hang was promoted to consort. Jingtai had no son with his primary spouse and empress. In May 1452, the emperor's son with Hang was declared heir to the throne, and Hang, now being the mother of the crown prince, was promoted to the position of empress. She died in 1456, the year before the deposition of her spouse.

== Titles ==
- During the reign of the Xuande Emperor (r. 1425–1435):
  - Lady Hang (杭氏)
- During the reign of the Jingtai Emperor (r. 1449–1457):
  - Consort Hang (杭妃; from 1449)
  - Empress (皇后; from 22 September 1452)
  - Empress Suxiao (肅孝皇后; from 1456)

== Issue ==
- As Lady Hang:
  - Zhu Jianji, Crown Prince Huaixian (懷獻皇太子 朱見濟; 28 March 1445 – 21 March 1453), the Jingtai Emperor's first son

== Notes ==
Chinese royalty
Preceded by Empress Xiaoyuanjing	Empress consort of China; 1452–1456	Succeeded by Empress Xiaozhuangrui
