= Dragon Force: So Long, Ultraman =

- Simplified Chinese: 钢铁飞龙之再见奥特曼
- Hanyu Pinyin: Gāngtiě fēilóng zhī zàijiàn àotèmàn
- Directed by: Tommy Wang
- Based on: Dragon Force by Kazuya Hatazawa and BlueArc Animation Ultraman by Eiji Tsuburaya
- Produced by: Tommy Wang
- Production companies: BlueArc Animation; Le Vision Pictures; TIGA Entertainment; UM Corporation
- Distributed by: Le Vision Pictures
- Release date: October 1, 2017 (China)
- Running time: 88 minutes
- Country: China
- Language: Chinese
- Box office: $1,418,500

Dragon Force: So Long, Ultraman (Chinese: 钢铁飞龙之再见奥特曼; pinyin: Gāngtiě fēilóng zhī zàijiàn àotèmàn) is a Chinese action film animated by BlueArc Animation in cooperation with Le Vision Pictures, TIGA Entertainment and UM Corporation. It is based on the 2012 3D animated series Dragon Force created by Kazuya Hatazawa and a sequel to the 2013 movie of the same name. It is directed and produced by Tommy Wang under the pseudonym Tommy Wang. The movie premiered in China on October 1, 2017.

== Production ==
The film was in production after an agreement with TIGA Entertainment and UM Corporation to allow BlueArc Animation to produce "Ultraman 3D Animation Movies" in Mainland China. After the company decided to create a sequel to the first Dragon Force film, BlueArc Animation brought in Le Vision Pictures as its production partner after their work in several American films. The film was officially unveiled in a new trailer, showcasing the character and Ultraman in its new appearance alongside a press conference in China on July 10, 2017. Tommy Wang stated that "This domestic animation film presents a new image of the hero Ultraman to the world, in the hopes it can surprise adults and children."

Tommy Wang stated that the film is the first in the series of Ultraman Films released in China. A sequel film is announced in 2018.

== Reception ==
Pre-release reception of the film's unveiling was unanimously negative. Most news sites in Japan and beyond called the film a "ripoff of Ultraman", with Chinese internet users took to social media to slam the film as a "crappy domestic rip-off." Majority of users in Japan also accused the Ultraman that appeared in the press conference for looking tacky and describes it to have "a mask, briefs, and a whole lot of body paint."

Post reception of the film is also slammed with unanimous negative criticism from fans and critics from both China and over the world, despite domestic positive reception. Movie review site Douban gave the film a 2.5/10, with comments from Chinese viewers criticizing the portrayal of the said character in the film, as well as the story. Tsubaraya Productions protested on the film's release on October 1, saying that "It is obviously infringing copyright. We won't tolerate it." However, Fun Movie International stated that "It is a judgement that allows the Chinese Supreme Court to grant us rights. It's legal." due to their licensing with Chaiyo. Long-time live actors from various Ultraman series also expressed their disappointment over the film. Tsuruno Takeshi, the actor for Shin Asuka of Ultraman Dyna stated on Twitter that "So you have finally showed yourself "Fake Ultraman". Using Fake Mask, wears the Justice and easily deceive the Children of China. I won't forgive the Dirty Villain.", implying the film's illegal use of the franchise. The series's creator, Kazuya Hatazawa, also expresses his disappointment over the film and said he has no involvement in it.

It however grossed over $1,418,500 in Chinese Box-office sales.

=== Controversy ===
During the unveiling of the movie, owner of the Ultra Series, Tsuburaya Productions, were not pleased on how the film ripped off the titular character, stating that "Our company is not at all connected [to this]" and that "The motion picture in question was made without our consent or supervision." Tsuburaya Productions President and CEO Shinichi Oka expressed his negative opinions over the film, saying that "This work has been produced without our permission or supervision. In addition, the usage of the Ultraman character image, etc., in this presentation has severely damaged the Ultraman brand, and is utterly unacceptable… We intend to take decisive measures, including legal action, against the Chinese company that made this announcement and the persons involved in the production of the film." Also, the film also contributes to the ongoing legal dispute between Tsuburaya, Sompote Sands, his company Chaiyo Productions and the companies producing the crossover film in China regarding the license of the Ultraman Franchise outside Japan. Controversy has reached through several Japanese news sites and tokusatsu fan sites with no lawsuits being filed. However, Tsuburaya announced in the light of the film's announcement that they will take BlueArc Animation, Le Vision Pictures, TIGA Entertainment, UM Corporation and Chaiyo Productions to court in the United States to determine who wins the rights to Ultraman.

On November 20, 2017, through a Los Angeles court ruling by Judge Andre Birotte Jr, Tsuburaya won the lawsuit against Chaiyo and affiliate groups, which in turn banned the film to be released worldwide. Tommy Wang stated that they withdrew their lawsuit against them after the court ruling against Chaiyo, and that they will venture more into producing new Ultraman-related media alongside Tsubaraya in China. But in a report in NHK stated that Tsubaraya did not approve of these actions. But on April 18, 2018, the legal court came to a definite close where a final judgement states that the dispute and the document was deemed invalid, forbidding UMC, Chaiyo Productions and BlueArc Animation to use the Ultra Series and all its related characters and forced them to pay Tsubaraya damages for its infringement of its rights. In June 2020, BlueArc Animation lost once again to Tsubaraya in a court case in Shanghai district court, forcing BlueArc Animation to pay more than $354,900 in damages.

==== Licensing disputes ====
This movie was licensed by UM Corporation and TIGA Entertainment who granted Guangzhou BlueArc/Blue Magic Culture Communications Co., Ltd. exclusive rights to produce and distribute "Ultraman 3D Animation Movies" within Mainland China, including Hong Kong, Macau, and Taiwan, for a period of three years, from January 1, 2017 until December 31, 2019[6]. This was all done without the permission or knowledge of Tsuburaya Productions[7], further fueling the then-ongoing licensing disputes for Ultraman internationally.

A dragon that appears in the movie also uses the roars of the Legendary Pictures Godzilla. Neither Toho or Legendary Pictures seemed to have taken action against BlueArc, however.

One of the trailers of the movie also used footage from the trailers of Ultraman X and Ultraman Orb, which UMC and affiliates, in any way, did not have the rights or permission to use.

== Sequels ==
Despite the ban of the film and the use of its intellectual property, BlueArc Animation announced that a sequel is in the works. The sequel film titled Dragon Force: Rise of Ultraman (Chinese: 钢铁飞龙之奥特曼崛起; pinyin: Gāngtiě fēilóng zhī àotèmàn juéqǐ) was released on January 18, 2019. This also attracted controversy and lawsuits from Tsubaraya Productions as the company ignored the ruling of the recent court case. Peerasit Saengduenchai, Sompote's son is facing court charges during the controversy.
