= Empress Qian =

Empress of China (1442–1449, 1457–1464)

Empress Xiaozhuangrui 孝莊睿皇后
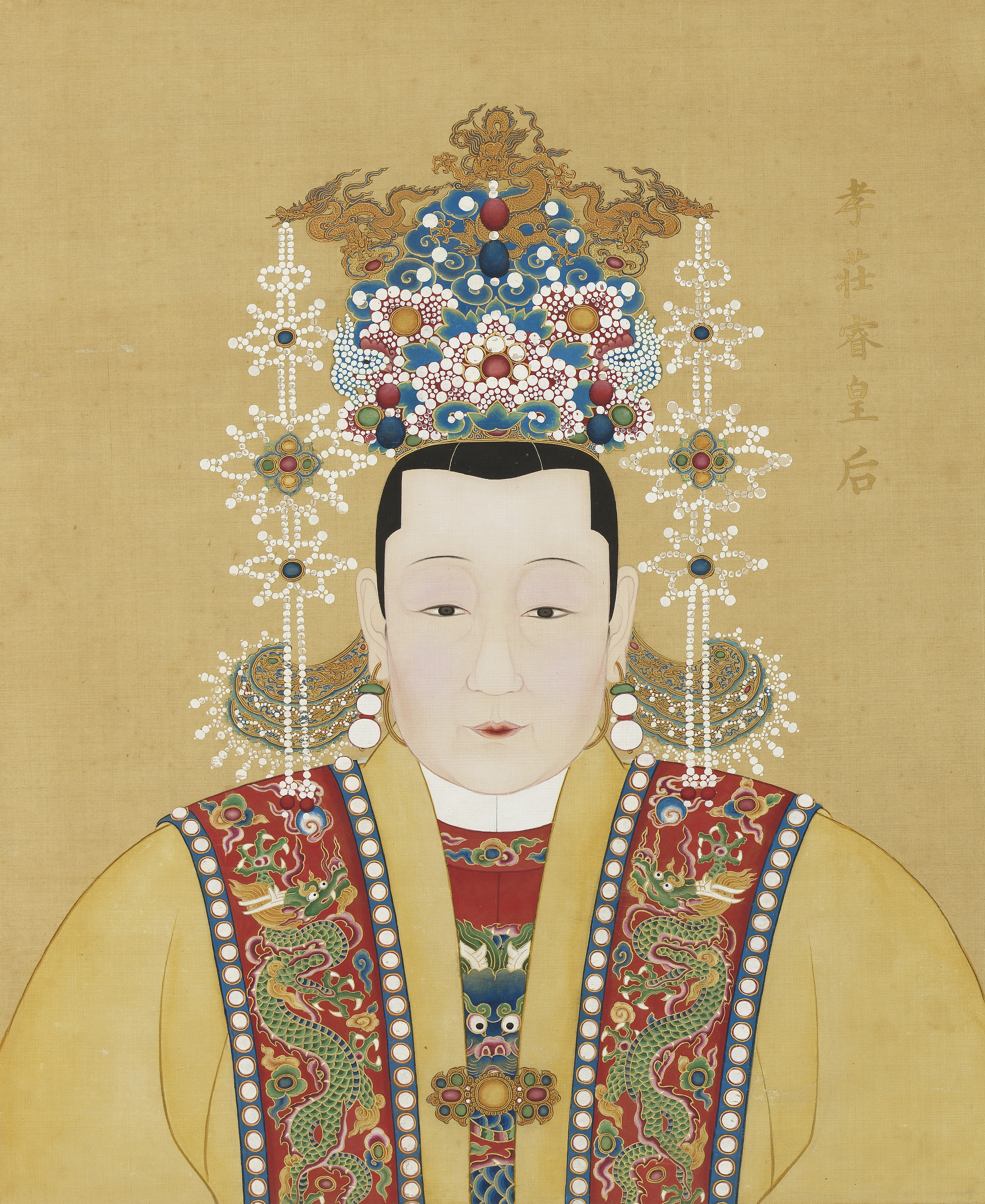

Empress consort of the Ming dynasty
- First tenure: 8 June 1442 – 22 September 1449
- Predecessor: Empress Xiaogongzhang
- Successor: Empress Wang
- Second tenure: 11 February 1457 – 23 February 1464
- Predecessor: Empress Suxiao
- Successor: Empress Wu

Empress dowager of the Ming dynasty
- Tenure: 23 February 1464 – 15 July 1468
- Predecessor: Empress Dowager Xiaoyi
- Successor: Empress Dowager Zhou
- Born: 1426; Haizhou (present-day Lianyungang)
- Died: 15 July 1468 (aged 41–42)
- Burial: 4 September 1468; Yu Mausoleum
- Spouse: Emperor Yingzong (m. 1442; died 1464)
Regnal name
- Empress Dowager Ciyi (慈懿皇太后)
Posthumous name
- Empress Xiàozhuāng Xiànmù Hónghuì Xiǎnrén Gōngtiān Qīnshèng Ruì (孝莊獻穆弘惠顯仁恭天欽聖睿皇后)
- Clan: Qian (錢)
- Father: Qian Gui (錢貴)
- Mother: Lady Chen (陳氏)

Empress Qian (simplified Chinese: 钱皇后; traditional Chinese: 錢皇后; pinyin: Qián huánghòu; 1426 – 15 July 1468) was a Chinese empress consort during the Ming dynasty, married to Emperor Yingzong of Ming. She was addressed posthumously as Empress Xiaozhuangrui (simplified Chinese: 孝庄睿皇后; traditional Chinese: 孝莊睿皇后; pinyin: Xiàozhuāngruì huánghòu)

== Early life ==
There is no record of Empress Qian's birth name, other than that she was a member of the clan Qian (Chinese: 錢). She married the Zhengtong Emperor on 8 June 1442, and became his primary consort and empress.

== Empress ==
In 1449, the Zhengtong Emperor was captured after the Battle of Tumu and his captors demanded a ransom, which Empress Qian and her mother-in-law promptly raised. The ransom was rejected in favour of holding on to the Zhengtong Emperor as hostage, which prompted the court to assign him the status of retired emperor and name his half-brother Zhu Qiyu as the Jingtai Emperor. Empress Qian was moved from the court to a separate palace to allow Empress Wang to take the title of empress consort.

When her spouse was returned by the Mongols, arriving in Beijing on 19 September 1450, Empress Qian joined him under house arrest in a guarded section of the Imperial City. When her spouse's only son, the future Chenghua Emperor, was deposed as heir apparent in 1452, he was sent to live with Empress Qian in conditions of physical hardship. In 1457, a coup-d'etat put her spouse back on the imperial throne as the Tianshun Emperor, reinstating Empress Qian as the empress consort.

== Empress dowager ==
Empress Qian had no children, and when the Zhengtong Emperor died in 1464, he was succeeded by the Chenghua Emperor. She became involved in a conflict with Empress Xiaosu, the biological mother of the new emperor. As the mother of the emperor, Empress Xiaosu demanded the same title as Qian: that of empress dowager. Xiaosu pointed out that she was the mother of the emperor while Qian was childless, while Qian demanded the title pointing to her loyalty to the late emperor, whose house arrest she had shared. The emperor was unable to solve the conflict to the satisfaction of both parties, but granted the title of empress dowager to both, though Qian's formal title acknowledged her higher rank and precedence in court proceedings.

== Titles ==
- During the reign of the Xuande Emperor (r. 1425–1435):
  - Lady Qian (錢氏; from 1426)
- During the reign of the Zhengtong Emperor (r. 1435–1449):
  - Empress (皇后; from 1442)
- During the reign of the Jingtai Emperor (r. 1449–1457):
  - Empress Emerita (太上皇后; from 1449)
- During the reign of the Tianshun Emperor (r. 1457–1464):
  - Empress (皇后; from 1457)
- During the reign of the Chenghua Emperor (r. 1464–1487)
  - Empress Dowager Ciyi (慈懿皇太后; from 28 February 1464)
  - Empress Xiàozhuāng Xiànmù Hónghuì Xiǎnrén Gōngtiān Qīnshèng Ruì (孝莊獻穆弘惠顯仁恭天欽聖睿皇后; from 1468)

== Death ==
Empress Dowager Qian died on 26 June 1468, and was interred at Yu ling in the Ming tomb complex near Beijing on 4 September 1468. The Tianshun Emperor specifically stated that she should only be buried next to him, 'after a thousand years of long life.'

== Sources ==
- Carington, Goodrich L.; Fang, Chaoying, eds. (1976). Dictionary of Ming Biography, 1368-1644. Vol. 2. New York: Columbia University Press. ISBN 023103833X.
- Tingyu, Zhang, ed. (1739). "《明史》卷一百十三 列传第一" [History of Ming, Volume 113, Historical Biography 1]. Lishichunqiu Net (in Chinese). Lishi Chunqiu.
- Mote, Frederick W. (1988). "The Ch'eng-hua and Hung-chih Reigns, 1465-1505". In Frederick W. Mote; Denis C. Twitchett (eds.). The Ming Dynasty, 1368–1644, Part 1. The Cambridge History of China. Vol. 7. Cambridge: Cambridge University Press. pp. 343–402. doi:10.1017/CHOL9780521243322.008. ISBN 9781139054751.
- Twitchett, Denis C. (1988). "The Cheng-tung, Ching-t'ai, and T'ien-shun Reigns, 1436-1464". In Frederick W. Mote; Denis C. Twitchett (eds.). The Ming Dynasty, 1368–1644, Part 1. The Cambridge History of China. Vol. 7. Cambridge: Cambridge University Press. pp. 305–342. doi:10.1017/CHOL9780521243322. ISBN 9781139054751.

Chinese royalty
Preceded by Empress Xiaogongzhang	Empress consort of China; 1442–1449	Succeeded by Empress Xiaoyuanjing
Chinese royalty
Preceded by Empress Suxiao	Empress consort of China; 1457–1464	Succeeded by Empress Wu
