= List of awards and nominations received by Byeon Woo-seok =

Byeon Woo-seok awards and nominations
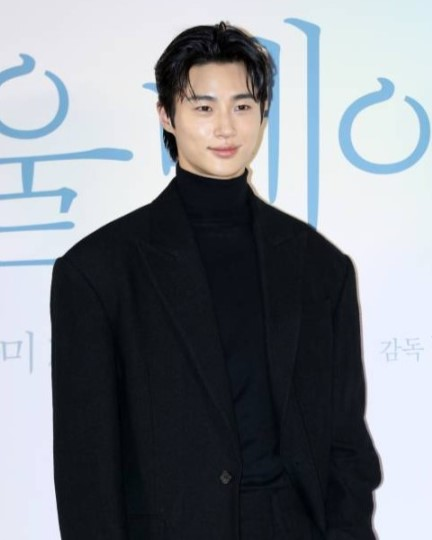
- Byeon in 2023
Awards and nominations
Award	Wins	Nominations
APAN Star Awards	4	5
Asia Artist Awards	6	7
Asia Contents Awards & Global OTT Awards	1	2
Asia Model Festival K-Model Awards	1	1
Asia Star Entertainer Awards	3	5
Asian Television Awards	0	1
Baeksang Arts Awards	1	3
Blue Dragon Ranking Awards	1	1
Brand of the Year Awards	2	2
Buil Film Awards	0	1
Fundex Awards	2	2
Grand Bell Awards	0	1
KBS Drama Awards	1	2
Korea Drama Awards	6	11
MAMA Awards	1	3
Melon Music Awards	1	2
Seoul Global Film Awards	1	1
Seoul International Drama Awards	1	1

Totals (Note: Certain award groups do not simply award one winner. They acknowledge several different recipients, have runners-up, and have third place. Since this is a specific recognition and is different from losing an award, runner-up mentions are considered wins in this award tally. For simplification and to avoid errors, each award in this list has been presumed to have had a prior nomination.)
- Wins: 32
- Nominations: 51

Byeon Woo-seok is a South Korean model and actor who has received numerous accolades including APAN Star Awards, Asia Artist Awards, Melon Music Awards, MAMA Awards, as well as nominations for Baeksang Arts Awards, a Buil Film Awards, and a Grand Bell Awards. For Byeon's role as the rebellious crown prince in Moonshine, he won the KBS Drama Awards for Best New actor. Byeon had his breakthrough in 2024 for playing the role as idol-actor Ryu Sun-jae, in the time slip, romantic comedy, television series Lovely Runner, which earned him nominations at the Asia Contents Awards & Global OTT Awards for Best newcomer, Baeksang Arts Award for Best Actor and Korea Drama Awards for the Grand Prize (Daesang). Byeon also won the Asia Artist Awards for Grand Prize (Daesang). For Byeon's debut on the big screen in the Netflix film 20th Century Girl (2022), and his role as Ham Jin-woo in the South Korean romantic drama film Soulmate, he was nominated for the Best New Actor at the Baeksang Arts Awards, the Buil Film Awards, and the Grand Bell Awards.

Byeon having sung the original soundtrack (OST) for the drama Lovely Runner which charted on the Billboard Global 200. The soundtrack earned him Best OST at the Melon Music Awards and APAN Star Awards, as well as MAMA Awards for Favourite Global Trending Music.

== Awards and nominations ==
Name of the award ceremony, year presented, category, nominee of the award, and the result of the nomination
Award ceremony	Year	Category	Nominee / Work	Result	Ref.
APAN Star Awards	2024	Best Couple	Byeon Woo-seok (with Kim Hye-yoon)	Won	
APAN Star Awards	2024	Best OST	Eclipse (Note: Eclipse is a fictional band from the series Lovely Runner. The song is performed by Byeon Woo-seok as vocalist, Lee Seung-hyub as guitarist, Yang Hyuk as bassist, and Moon Yong-suk as drummer.) – "Sudden Shower"	Won	
APAN Star Awards	2024	Hallyu Star Award	Lovely Runner	Won	
APAN Star Awards	2024	Popularity Award – Male Actor	Lovely Runner	Won	
APAN Star Awards	2024	Top Excellence Award, Actor in a Miniseries	Lovely Runner	Nominated	
Asia Artist Awards	2024	Asia Celebrity Award – Television	Byeon Woo-seok	Won	
Asia Artist Awards	2024	Best Actor of the Year (Daesang) (Note: A Daesang (Korean: 대상), which translates to "Grand Prize", is the highest honor given out at South Korean award ceremonies.)	Byeon Woo-seok	Won	
Asia Artist Awards	2024	Best Artist Award – Television / Film	Byeon Woo-seok	Won	
Asia Artist Awards	2024	Best Couple Award	Byeon Woo-seok (with Kim Hye-yoon)	Won	
Asia Artist Awards	2024	Best OST	Eclipse – "Sudden Shower"	Won	
Asia Artist Awards	2024	Popularity Award – Actor	Byeon Woo-seok	Won	
Asia Artist Awards	2026	Popularity Award – Actor	Byeon Woo-seok	Pending	
Asia Contents Awards & Global OTT Awards	2024	People's Choice Award – Male	Lovely Runner	Won	
Asia Contents Awards & Global OTT Awards	2024	Best Newcomer Actor	Lovely Runner	Nominated	
Asia Model Festival K-Model Awards	2016	Fashion Model Award	Byeon Woo-seok	Won	
Asia Star Entertainer Awards	2025	Best Artist (Actor)	Byeon Woo-seok	Won	
Asia Star Entertainer Awards	2025	Fan Choice Artist (Actor)	Byeon Woo-seok	Won	
Asia Star Entertainer Awards	2025	Best OST	Eclipse – "Sudden Shower"	Won	
Asia Star Entertainer Awards	2025	Fan Choice (Character)	Byeon Woo-seok (as Ryu Sun-jae)	Nominated	
Asia Star Entertainer Awards	2025	Fan Choice (Couple)	Byeon Woo-seok (with Kim Hye-yoon)	Nominated	
Asian Television Awards	2024	Best Theme Song	Lovely Runner	Nominated	
Baeksang Arts Awards	2023	Best New Actor – Film	20th Century Girl	Nominated	
Baeksang Arts Awards	2025	Most Popular Actor	Byeon Woo-seok	Won	
Baeksang Arts Awards	2025	Best Actor – Television	Lovely Runner	Nominated	
Blue Dragon Ranking Awards (Note: The Blue Dragon Ranking is a popularity award organized by Sports Chosun, the organizer of the Blue Dragon Film Awards and Blue Dragon Series Awards. It recognizes trend-setting actors by presenting semiannual awards for Best Actor and Best Actress.)	2024	Best Actor (Note: Second Half of 2024.)	Lovely Runner	Won	
Blue Dragon Series Awards	2026	Popular Star Award	Jae-seok's B&B Rules!	Won	
Brand of the Year Awards	2024	Actor – Hot Trend	Byeon Woo-seok	Won	
Brand of the Year Awards	2025	Best Actor (Indonesia)	Byeon Woo-seok	Won	
Buil Film Awards	2023	Best New Actor	20th Century Girl	Nominated	
Fundex Awards	2024	Best Actor – TV Drama	Lovely Runner	Won	
Fundex Awards	2024	Grand Prize of Player (Daesang)	Lovely Runner	Won	
Grand Bell Awards	2023	Best New Actor	Soulmate	Nominated	
KBS Drama Awards	2022	Best New Actor	Moonshine	Won	
KBS Drama Awards	2022	Popularity Award – Actor	Moonshine	Nominated	
Korea Drama Awards	2024	Hot Star Award (Male)	Lovely Runner	Won	
Korea Drama Awards	2024	Best Couple	Byeon Woo-seok (with Kim Hye-yoon)	Nominated	
Korea Drama Awards	2024	Best OST	Eclipse – "Sudden Shower"	Nominated	
Korea Drama Awards	2024	Global Star	Lovely Runner	Nominated	
Korea Drama Awards	2024	Grand Prize (Daesang)	Lovely Runner	Nominated	
Korea Drama Awards	2025	Global Star	Byeon Woo-seok	Won	
Korea Drama Awards	2025	Hot Star Award (Male)	Byeon Woo-seok	Won	
Korea Drama Awards	2026	Hot Star (Male)	Byeon Woo-seok	Won	
Korea Drama Awards	2026	Global Star	Byeon Woo-seok	Won	
Korea Drama Awards	2026	Best Couple Award	Byeon Woo-seok (with IU); Perfect Crown	Won	
Korea Drama Awards	2026	Best OST	Fate Line – "Perfect Crown"	Nominated	
MAMA Awards	2024	Favourite Global Trending Music	Byeon Woo-seok	Won	
MAMA Awards	2024	Best OST	Eclipse – "Sudden Shower"	Nominated	
MAMA Awards	2024	Song of the Year	Eclipse – "Sudden Shower"	Nominated	
Melon Music Awards	2024	Best OST	Eclipse – "Sudden Shower"	Won	
Melon Music Awards	2024	Top 10 Artist	Eclipse	Nominated	
Seoul Global Movie Awards	2024	Popularity Award – Actor	Lovely Runner	Won	
Seoul International Drama Awards	2024	Outstanding Asian Star: Korea Popularity Award – Male	Lovely Runner	Won	

== Other accolades ==
=== State honors ===
Name of country or organization, year given, and name of honor
Country or organization	Award ceremony	Year	Honor or award	Ref.
South Korea	Korean Popular Culture and Arts Awards (Note: Honors are given at the Korean Popular Culture and Arts Awards, arranged by the Korea Creative Content Agency and hosted by the Ministry of Culture, Sports and Tourism. They are awarded to those who have contributed to the arts and South Korea's pop culture.)	2025	Minister of Culture, Sports and Tourism Commendation	

=== Listicles ===
Name of publisher, year listed, name of listicle, and placement
Publisher	Year	Listicle	Placement	Ref.
Cine21	2021	New Actors that will lead Korean Video Content Industry in 2022	5th (Note: mentioned together with Kim Seon-ho, Wi Ha-joon, Song Kang, Rowoon, and Lee Jun-young)	
Cine21	2024	Actor with Impressive Performance in 2024	1st	
Cine21	2024	New Actor of 2025	2nd	
Cine21	2024	Actor to watch out for in 2025	3rd	
Cine21	2024	Most Influential Actors (Series)	2nd	
Forbes	2025	Korea Power Celebrity	18th	
Forbes	2026	Korea Power Celebrity	17th	
Gallup Korea	2024	Gallup Korea's Television Actor of the Year	4th	
Gallup Korea	2025	Gallup Korea's Television Actor of the Year	7th (Note: Tied for 7th place with 2.9% votes each with Kim Tae-ri, Han Ji-min and Namgoong Min)	
JoyNews24	2024	Best Actor of 2024	1st	
JoyNews24	2024	Best Rising Star of 2024	1st	
Star News Korea (Note: Star News Korea commissioned Gallup Korea for the survey)	2024	Most Anticipated Next Generation Actor	4th (Note: Tied for 4th place with 18% votes each with Go Youn-jung)	
Star News Korea	2024	Best Television Couple of the Past Decade	8th (Note: With Kim Hye-yoon for Lovely Runner (2024))	
Sisa Journal	2024	100 Next Generation Leader	Included	
