= Byeon Woo-seok filmography =

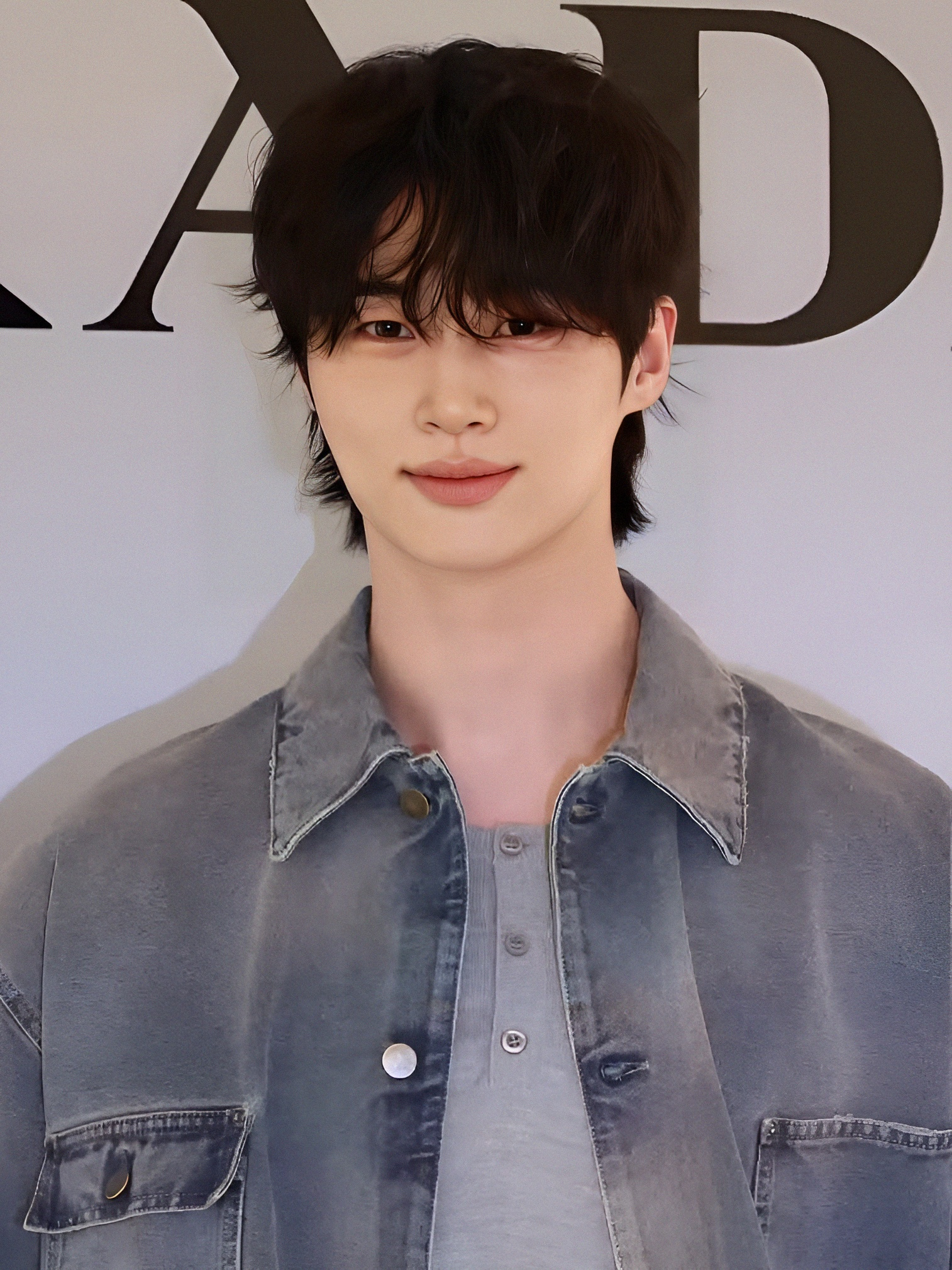
- Byeon in 2025
- Film: 4
- Television series: 15
- Web series: 4
- Web show: 2
- Music videos: 2

South Korean actor Byeon Woo-seok made his debut as an actor in 2016 and had supporting roles in dramas Record of Youth (2020) and Strong Girl Nam-soon (2023). He gained wide recognition with television series Lovely Runner (2024), and made his film debut with the Netflix film 20th Century Girl (2022).

== Film ==
Year	Title	Role	Notes	Ref.
2017	Midnight Runners	Club entertainer	Cameo	
2019	Ashfall	Bodyguard	Cameo	
2022	20th Century Girl	Poong Woon-ho		
2023	Soulmate	Ham Jin-woo		

== Television series ==
Key
†	Denotes films or TV productions that have not yet been released

Year	Title	Role	Notes	Ref.
2016	Dear My Friends	Son Jong-shik	Cameo	
2016	Moon Lovers: Scarlet Heart Ryeo	Go Ha-jin's ex-boyfriend	Cameo (episode 1, 3)	
2016	Weightlifting Fairy Kim Bok-joo	Joon-Hyung's senior	Cameo (episode 16)	
2017	Live Up to Your Name	Heo-jun's assistant		
2017	Drama Stage – "The B Manager and the Love Letter"	Jung Do-jin	One-act drama	
2017	Drama Stage – "History of Walking Upright"	Jong-min	One-act drama	
2019	Welcome to Waikiki 2	Yoon Seo-jun	Cameo (episode 4)	
2019	Search: WWW	Han Min-gyu	Cameo (episode 3–5, 7, 16)	
2019	Flower Crew: Joseon Marriage Agency	Do Joon		
2020	Record of Youth	Won Hae-hyo		
2021–2022	Moonshine	Lee Pyo		
2023	Strong Girl Nam-soon	Ryu Shi-oh		
2024	Lovely Runner	Ryu Sun-jae		
2024	No Gain No Love	Woo-seok	Cameo (episode 4)	
2026	Perfect Crown	Prince Lee Ahn		
TBA	Solo Leveling	Sung Jin-woo		

== Web series ==
Year	Title	Role	Notes	Ref.
2017	Secret Crushes: Season 3	Byun Woo-suk		
2017–2018	Modulove	Himself		
2019	Office Watch 3	Ha Min-gyu		

== Web shows ==
Year	Title	Role	Notes	Ref.
2015–2017	Mr.Chu	Main host	Season 1–3	
2026	Jae-seok's B&B Rules	Main Cast	with Yoo Jae-suk and Lee Kwang-soo	

== Music video appearances ==
Year	Title	Artist	Ref.
2014	"Sweet (Brand New Mix)" (달아요) (featuring Verbal Jint)	Lena Park	
2019	"Song Request" (featuring Suga)	Lee Sora	
2025	"The Christmas Song"	Byeon Woo-seok	
