= Asia Star Entertainer Awards 2025 =

2025 edition of award ceremony

- Promotional poster
- Date: May 28–29, 2025
- Venue: K-Arena Yokohama, Yokohama
- Country: Japan
- Presented by: Newsen; Star1
- Hosted by: Juyeon and Rei (Day 1); Kim Hye-yoon, Hyungwon, and Younghoon (Day 2)
- Most awards: Aespa; Byeon Woo-seok; Enhypen; I-dle; Kim Hye-yoon (3)
- Website: https://www.asea.kr

Television/radio coverage
- Network: Broadcast: TBS; Streaming: Abema; Dalda; Naver TV

The Asia Star Entertainer Awards 2025 was an award ceremony held at K-Arena Yokohama in Yokohama on May 28–29, 2025. It is the 2025 edition of the annual award show Asia Star Entertainer Awards. The award ceremony was hosted by Juyeon and Rei for the first day and Kim Hye-yoon, Hyungwon, and Younghoon for the second day. It was broadcast live in Japan via TBS and Abema, in Korea via Naver TV, and worldwide via Dalda.

== Performers ==
The lineup of performers was announced throughout April and May 2025.

=== Day 1 (May 28) ===
Performances for Day 1
Artist(s)	Song(s) Performed
Aespa	"Whiplash" "Supernova" "Armageddon"
Enhypen	"No Doubt" "Paranormal" "Loose"
Hearts2Hearts	"The Chase" "Butterflies"
KiiiKiii	"I Do Me" "BTG" "Groundwork"
NCT Wish	"Poppop" "Steady" "Choo Choo"
Nexz	Intro: "Heartbeat" / "Just Right" / "S-Class" "Simmer" "Ride the Vibe" "O-RLY?"
NiziU	"Love Line" "Yoake" "Life is Beautiful"
Nowz	"OoWee" "Why Not?" "Let's Get It"
Timelesz	"Rock This Party" "One and Only" "Anthem"
Xdinary Heroes	"Beautiful Life" "Strawberry Cake" "Little Things"

=== Day 2 (May 29) ===
Performances for Day 1
Artist(s)	Song(s) Performed
&Team	"Go in Blind (Getsurou)" "Run Wild" (Korean version)
Atarashii Gakko!	"Tokyo Calling" "One Heart"
Badvillain	"Badvillain" "Yah-Ho (Badtitude)" "Zoom"
BtoB	"Love Today" "Only One for Me" "Missing You"
Fantasy Boys	"Undeniable" "Get it On"
Hana	"Drop" "Rose"
I-dle	"Good Thing" "Girlfriend" "Fate"
N.SSign	"Sherlock (Clue + Note)" "Happy &" "Love Potion"
Nouera	"N.I.N (New is Now)" "MU"
Sakurazaka46	"Jigōjitoku" "Udagawa Generation"
The Boyz	"Rock and Roll" "VVV"
The Rampage from Exile Tribe	"Kumo no Ito" "Stampede" "Rizzup"
Zerobaseone	"Good So Bad" "Devil Game"

== Winner and nominees ==
The winners are listed in alphanumerical order and emphasized in bold.

=== Grand Prize ===
Artist of the Year
**Aespa**
Album of the Year	Song of the Year
**Enhypen – Romance: Untold**	**Aespa – "Supernova"**
Performance of the Year	Record the Year
**Zerobaseone**	**I-dle**

=== Main & Special Awards ===
The Platinum (Bonsang)
**&Team**; **Aespa**; **Enhypen**; **I-dle**; **Ive**; **NCT Wish**; **NiziU**; **Sakurazaka46**; **Timelesz**; **The Boyz**; **The Rampage from Exile Tribe**; **Zerobaseone**
Best New Artist	Best Artist
**Actor: Jo Yu-ri**; Singer: **Hana**; **Hearts2Hearts**; **KiiiKiii**; **Nexz**	Actor: **Byeon Woo-seok**; **Choo Young-woo**; **Kim Hye-yoon**; Singer: **Atarashii Gakko!**; **Timelesz**
Best Group	Best Solo Artist
**Female: NiziU**; **Male: Plave**; **Vocal: BtoB**	**Female: Jisoo**; **Male: Lim Young-woong**
Best Performance	Best Conceptual Artist
**NCT Wish**	**The Boyz**
Best Band	Best Trot
**Xdinary Heroes**	**Lee Chan-won**
Global K-pop Leader	Global Rising Artist
**I-dle**	**Choo Young-woo**
Hot Icon	Hot Trend
**Fantasy Boys**; **N.SSign**	**Badvillain**; **Nouera**; **Nowz**
Top Touring Artist	Best Producer
**Enhypen**	**Sky-Hi**
Best OST
**Eclipse (Note: Eclipse is a fictional band from the series Lovely Runner. The song is performed by Byeon Woo-seok as vocalist, Lee Seung-hyub as guitarist, Yang Hyuk as bassist, and Moon Yong-suk as drummer.) – "Sudden Shower" (from Lovely Runner)**; **Jin – "Close to You" (from When the Stars Gossip)**

=== Popularity Awards ===
Fan Choice – Character	Fan Choice – Couple
**Kim Hye-yoon – Lovely Runner as Im Sol**	**Kentaro Sakaguchi and Lee Se-young – What Comes After Love**
Fan Choice – Artist	Fan Choice – 5th Generation Artist
Actor: **Byeon Woo-seok**; **Kim Hye-yoon**; **Singer: Lim Young-woong**	**Plave**

== Multiple awards ==
The following artist(s) received two or more awards:

Count	Artist(s)
3	Aespa
3	Byeon Woo-seok (Note: Including one as Eclipse.)
3	Enhypen
3	I-dle
3	Kim Hye-yoon
2	Choo Young-woo
2	Lim Young-woong
2	NCT Wish
2	NiziU
2	Plave
2	Timelesz
2	The Boyz
2	Zerobaseone
