= Asia Artist Awards =

South Korean awards ceremony

- Previous: 10th Asia Artist Awards; December 10, 2025; Pending: 11th Asia Artist Awards; December 5-6, 2026
- Official logo
- Native name: 아시아 아티스트 어워즈
- Awarded for: Outstanding achievements in the music, television and film
- Country: South Korea
- Presented by: Money Today; Star News; MTN
- First award: November 16, 2016; 10 years ago
- Website: www.asiaartistawards.com

Asia Artist Awards (Korean: 아시아 아티스트 어워즈; abbreviated as AAA) is an awards ceremony organized by South Korea-based business newspaper Money Today and its global media brands Star News and MTN. It honors outstanding achievements and international contributions of South Korean artists in television, film and music. The inaugural ceremony was held on November 16, 2016, at Kyung Hee University's Hall of Peace in Seoul, and was broadcast live via satellite across Asia.

== Ceremonies ==
Edition	Date	Venue	City	Country	Host	Ref.
1st	November 16, 2016	Hall of Peace, Kyung Hee University	Seoul	South Korea	Leeteuk and Lee Si-young	
2nd	November 15, 2017	Jamsil Students' Gymnasium	Seoul	South Korea	Leeteuk and Lee Tae-im	
3rd	November 28, 2018	Namdong Gymnasium	Incheon	South Korea	Leeteuk and Lee Sung-kyung	
4th	November 26, 2019	Mỹ Đình National Stadium	Hanoi	Vietnam	Leeteuk and Lim Ji-yeon	
5th	November 28, 2020	Online Ceremony	Seoul	South Korea	Leeteuk and Park Ju-hyun	
6th	December 2, 2021	KBS Arena	Seoul	South Korea	Leeteuk and Jang Won-young	
7th	December 13, 2022	Nippon Gaishi Hall	Nagoya	Japan	Leeteuk and Jang Won-young	
8th	December 14, 2023	Philippine Arena	Bocaue	Philippines	Kang Daniel, Jang Won-young and Sung Han-bin	
9th	December 27, 2024	Impact Challenger Hall 1–2	Bangkok	Thailand	Jang Won-young, Sung Han-bin and Ryu Jun-yeol	
10th	December 6, 2025	National Stadium	Kaohsiung	Taiwan	Lee Jun-ho and Jang Won-young	
11th	December 5–6, 2026	National Stadium	Kaohsiung	Taiwan	Jang Won-young, Ji Chang-wook, Sung Han-bin and Tzuyu	

== Winners ==
=== Grand Prize (Daesang) ===
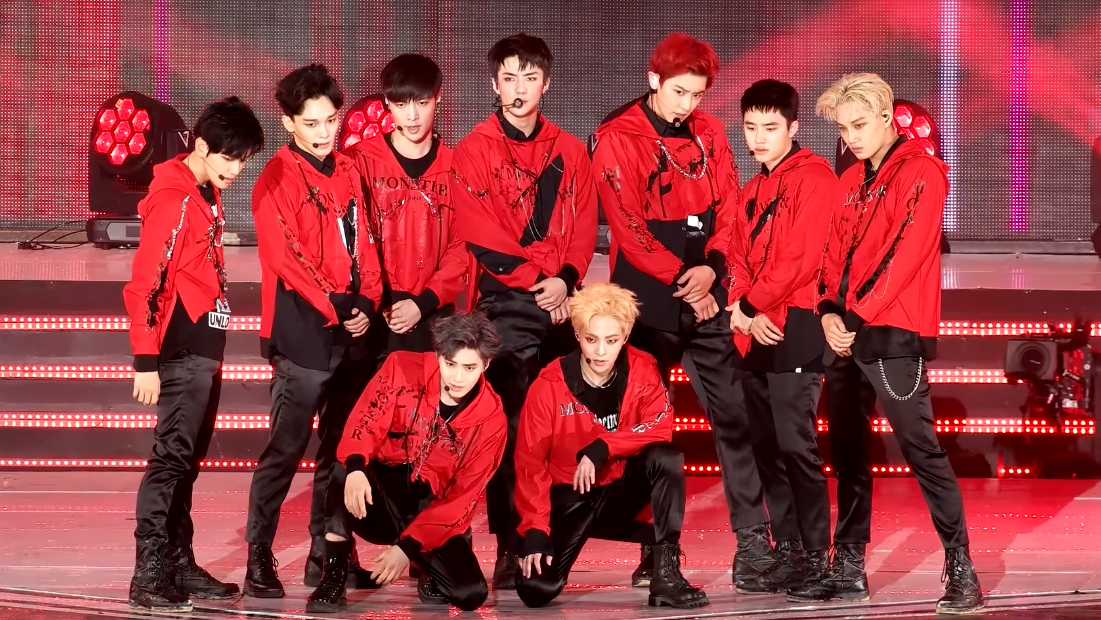
Boy band Exo was the first recipient of the Grand Prize (Daesang) in Music

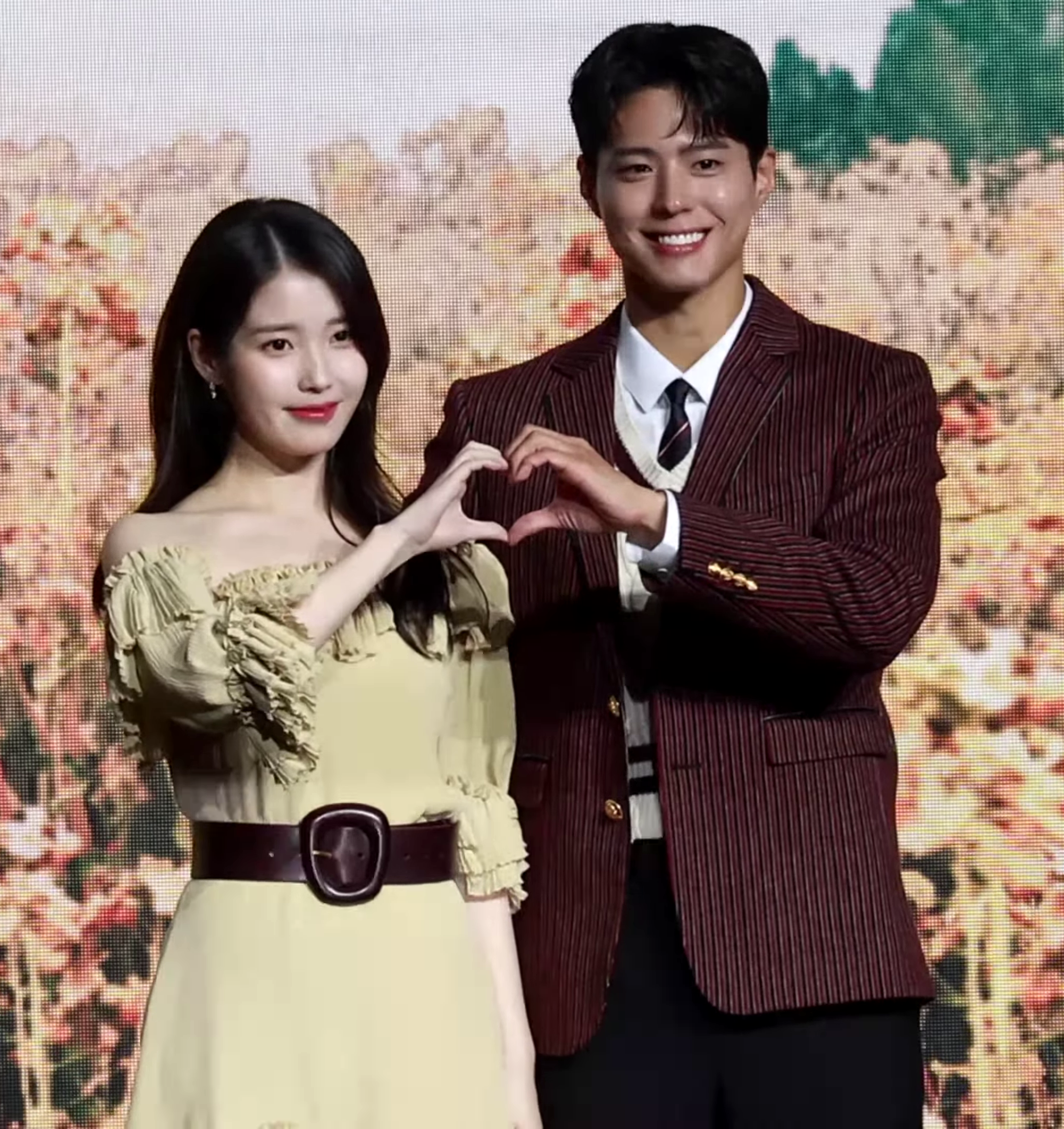
IU (L) and Park Bo-gum each won a Grand Prize (Daesang) in Television/Film for their work on the series When Life Gives You Tangerines during the award show's 10th anniversary in 2025

Year	Category	Winner	Ref.
2016	Television / Film	Cho Jin-woong	
2016	Music	Exo	
2017	Television / Film	Kim Hee-sun	
2017	Music	Exo	
2018	Television / Film	Lee Byung-hun	
2018	Music	BTS	
2019	Television / Film	Jang Dong-gun (Actor/Actress of the Year)	
2019	Music	Seventeen – An Ode (Album of the Year)	
2019	Music	Twice (Artist of the Year)	
2019	Music	Got7 (Performance of the Year)	
2019	Music	Red Velvet – "Umpah Umpah" (Song of the Year)	
2020	Television / Film	Kim Soo-hyun (Actor/Actress of the Year: Drama)	
2020	Television / Film	Lee Jung-jae (Actor/Actress of the Year: Film)	
2020	Music	NCT – NCT 2020 Resonance Pt. 1 (Album of the Year)	
2020	Music	Twice (Artist of the Year)	
2020	Music	Got7 (Performance of the Year)	
2020	Music	BTS – "Dynamite" (Song of the Year)	
2020	Music	Monsta X (Stage of the Year)	
2020	Music	Lim Young-woong (Trot of the Year)	
2021	Television / Film	Lee Jung-jae (Actor of the Year)	
2021	Television / Film	Lee Seung-gi (Actor/Actress of the Year: Drama)	
2021	Television / Film	Yoo Ah-in (Actor/Actress of the Year: Film)	
2021	Music	Seventeen (Singer of the Year)	
2021	Music	NCT 127 – Sticker (Album of the Year)	
2021	Music	Stray Kids (Performance of the Year)	
2021	Music	BTS – "Butter" (Song of the Year)	
2021	Music	aespa (Stage of the Year)	
2021	Music	Lim Young-woong (Trot of the Year)	
2022	Television / Film	Lee Jun-ho (Actor of the Year)	
2022	Music	NewJeans (Performance of the Year)	
2022	Music	Lim Young-woong (Stage of the Year)	
2022	Music	Ive (Song of the Year)	
2022	Music	Stray Kids (Album of the Year)	
2022	Music	Seventeen (Singer of the Year)	
2023	Television / Film	Lee Jun-ho (Actor of the Year)	
2023	Music	NewJeans (Singer of the Year)	
2023	Music	Seventeen – FML (Album of the Year)	
2023	Music	NewJeans – "Ditto" (Song of the Year)	
2023	Music	Stray Kids (Stage of the Year)	
2023	Music	BSS (Performance of the Year)	
2023	Music	Lim Young-woong (Fandom of the Year)	
2024 (9th)	Television / Film	Kim Soo-hyun (Artist of the Year: Actor)	
2024 (9th)	Television / Film	Park Min-young (Best Actress of the Year)	
2024 (9th)	Television / Film	Byeon Woo-seok (Best Actor of the Year)	
2024 (9th)	Music	NewJeans (Artist of the Year: Singer)	
2024 (9th)	Music	DAY6 – Fourever (Album of the Year)	
2024 (9th)	Music	Rosé and Bruno Mars – "APT." (Song of the Year)	
2024 (9th)	Music	NCT 127 (Stage of the Year)	
2024 (9th)	Music	Le Sserafim (Performance of the Year)	
2025	Television / Film	IU (Artist of the Year: Actor)	
2025	Television / Film	Moon So-ri (Best Actress of the Year: OTT)	
2025	Television / Film	Park Bo-gum (Best Actor of the Year: OTT)	
2025	Television / Film	Yoona (Best Actress of the Year: TV)	
2025	Television / Film	Lee Jun-ho (Best Actor of the Year: TV)	
2025	Music	Stray Kids (Artist of the Year: Singer)	
2025	Music	Stray Kids – Karma (Album of the Year)	
2025	Music	Ive – "Rebel Heart" (Song of the Year)	
2025	Music	Ateez (Stage of the Year)	
2025	Music	Riize (Performance of the Year)	
2025	Music	Le Sserafim (Music Icon of the Year)	

=== Rookie of the Year ===
Year	Category	Winner
2016	Television / Film	Ryu Jun-yeol, Kwak Si-yang, Sung Hoon, Lee Jung-shin, Nana
2016	Music	NCT 127, Blackpink
2017	Television / Film	Ahn Hyo-seop, Jung Chae-yeon
2017	Music	Wanna One, Pristin, Kard
2018	Television / Film	Kim Da-mi, Jang Ki-yong
2018	Music	The Boyz, Stray Kids, (G)I-dle, IZ*ONE
2019	Television / Film	Ong Seong-wu
2019	Music	TXT, AB6IX, ITZY
2020	Television / Film	Han So-hee, Lee Jae-wook
2020	Music	Treasure, Secret Number
2021	Television / Film	Lee Do-hyun
2021	Music	Enhypen, Aespa
2022	Television / Film	Kang Daniel, Seo Bum-june
2022	Music	IVE, NewJeans, LE SSERAFIM
2023	Television / Film	Lee Eun-saem, Moon Sang-min
2023	Music	Zerobaseone
2024	Television / Film	Jang Da-ah
2024	Music	TWS, QWER
2025	Television / Film	Park Yoon-ho
2025	Music	KiiiKiii, Cortis, AllDay Project

=== Popularity Award ===
(Determined through fan votes)

Year	Category	Winner	Ref.
2016	Television / Film	Baekhyun, Yoona	
2016	Music	Exo	
2017	Television / Film	D.O., Yoona	
2017	Music	Exo	
2018	Television / Film	Sehun, IU	
2018	Music	BTS	
2019	Music	Stray Kids, Loona, Kang Daniel	
2020	Television / Film	Park Jin-young, Song Ji-hyo	
2020	Singer	BTS, Twice	
2020	Trot	Lim Young-woong	
2021	Television / Film	Kim Seon-ho, Song Ji-hyo	
2021	Music	Exo, Twice, CL, Lim Young-woong	
2022	Television / Film	Kim Seon-ho, Kim Se-jeong	
2022	Music	BTS	
2023	Television / Film	Lee Jun-ho, Kim Se-jeong	
2023	Music	Sakurazaka46, Lim Young-woong	
2024	Television / Film	Byeon Woo-seok, Kim Hye-yoon	
2024	Music	Lim Young-woong, NiziU	
2025	Television / Film	Lee Jun-ho, Kim Hye-yoon	
2025	Music	Stray Kids, NiziU, Yuqi	

=== Asia Celebrity ===
Year	Category	Winner
2019	Television / Film	Ji Chang-wook, Park Min-young
2019	Music	Red Velvet, NU'EST
2020	Television / Film	Lee Joon-gi
2020	Music	Kang Daniel, WayV
2021	Television / Film	Yoo Ah-in, Bright Vachirawit, Win Metawin
2021	Music	BamBam, The Boyz
2022	Television / Film	Kim Seon-ho, Kwon Yu-ri, PP, Billkin
2022	Music	ITZY, Lyodra
2023	Television / Film	Kentaro Sakaguchi, Kim Seon-ho
2023	Music	Jang Won-young, LE SSERAFIM, NewJeans, ITZY, Lyodra
2024	Television / Film	Byeon Woo-seok
2024	Music	Jang Won-young
2025	Television / Film	Park Bo-gum
2025	Music	Jang Won-young

=== Best Artist Award ===
Year	Category	Winner
2016	Television / Film	Park Hae-jin, Park Shin-hye
2016	Music	BTS, Twice
2017	Television / Film	Namkoong Min, Park Hae-jin, Yoona
2017	Music	Seventeen
2018	Television / Film	Ha Jung-woo
2018	Music	Seventeen, Twice, Wanna One
2019	Television / Film	Park Min-young, Yoona, Zico
2020	Television / Film	Lee Joon-gi, Seo Yea-ji
2020	Music	Mamamoo, NCT 127
2021	Television / Film	Jeon Yeo-been, Han So-hee
2021	Music	BamBam, Brave Girls, Enhypen
2022	Television / Film	Han So-hee, Seo In-guk, Park Min-young
2022	Music	Itzy, The Boyz, The Rampage from Exile Tribe
2023	Television / Film	Kim Ji-hoon, Kim Seon-ho, Kentaro Sakaguchi
2023	Music	AKMU, IVE, The Boyz, ITZY, Le Sserafim, SB19
2024	Television / Film	Park Min-young, Kim Hye-yoon, Ahn Bo-hyun, Byeon Woo-seok, Joo Won, Ryu Jun-yeol, Kentaro Sakaguchi, Kim Soo-hyun
2024	Music	Zerobaseone, DAY6, NCT 127, NewJeans, Ive, Aespa, Kiss of Life, Suho, Le Sserafim, TWS, BUS (Because of you I shine), WayV, Bibi
2025	Television / Film	IU, Im Yoon-ah, Kim You-jung, Moon So-ri, Uhm Ji-won, Lee Jun-ho, Lee Joon-hyuk, Park Bo-gum, Takeru Satoh,
2025	Music	AllDay Project, Ateez, Ive, JJ Lin, Le Sserafim, Monsta X, RIIZE, Stray Kids, Woodz

=== Best Icon Award ===
Year	Category	Winner
2016	Television / Film	Kim You-jung
2016	Music	BTS
2017	Television / Film	Seo Kang-joon
2017	Music	Hwang Chi-yeul, Crush, Mamamoo
2018	Television / Film	Choi Tae-joon, Kim Myung-soo
2018	Music	Monsta X, Momoland
2019	Television / Film	Jung Hae-in, Choi Si-won
2019	Music	Seventeen, Chungha
2020	Television / Film	Lee Joo-young
2020	Music	Pentagon, AB6IX
2021	Television / Film	Ryu Kyung-soo
2021	Music	Woodz
2022	Television / Film	Im Jae-hyuk
2022	Music	AleXa, Verivery
2023	Television / Film	Cha Joo-young
2023	Music	Kep1er, Nmixx, Tempest
2024	Music	&Team
2025	Television / Film	Choo Young-woo
2025	Music	Cravity

=== Best OST Award ===
Year	Winner	Work
2016	Gummy	"You Are My Everything" (Descendants of the Sun); "Moonlight Drawn By Clouds" (Love in the Moonlight)
2017	Ailee	"I Will Go to You Like the First Snow" (Guardian: The Lonely and Great God)
2021	Lim Young-woong	"Love Always Run Away" (Young Lady and Gentleman)
2024	Byeon Woo-seok	"Sudden Shower" (Lovely Runner)
2025	KPop Demon Hunters	"Golden" (KPop Demon Hunters)

=== Fabulous Award ===
Year	Category	Winner
2017	Television / Film	Park Seo-joon, Lee Joon-gi
2017	Music	Exo, Super Junior
2018	Television / Film	Lee Byung-hun, Ha Jung-woo
2018	Music	BTS, Twice
2021	Television / Film	Lee Jung-jae
2021	Music	Seventeen
2022	Music	Seventeen, Lim Young-woong
2023	Television / Film	Kathryn Bernardo, Daniel Padilla
2023	Music	Stray Kids, NewJeans
2024	Television / Film	Kim Soo-hyun
2025	Television / Film	IU, Lee Jun-ho

=== Focus Award ===
Year	Category	Winner
2018	Television / Film	Jin Ju-hyung, Kim Yong-ji, Shin Hyun-soo
2018	Music	D-Crunch, W24
2019	Television / Film	Lee Jung-eun
2019	Music	Loona, Dongkiz
2020	Television / Film	Ahn Eun-jin
2020	Music	Oneus, AleXa
2021	Television / Film	Doyoung, Park Geon-il
2021	Music	DKB, Kingdom, Blitzers
2022	Television / Film	Haknyeon
2022	Music	Lapillus, ATBO, Trendz
2023	Television / Film	Younghoon, Ahn Dong-goo
2023	Music	Hori7on, Lun8
2024	Music	WHIB

=== New Wave Award ===
Year	Category	Winner
2017	Television / Film	Choi Tae-joon, Gong Seung-yeon, Shin Hyun-soo
2017	Music	Snuper, Astro, The Rampage from Exile Tribe
2018	Television / Film	Kim Seol-hyun
2018	Music	Kard, Cosmic Girls, Gugudan
2021	Television / Film	Na In-woo
2021	Music	STAYC, Weeekly
2022	Television / Film	Hwang Min-hyun, Choi Si-won
2022	Music	Tempest, Nmixx, Kep1er
2023	Television / Film	Park Jae-chan
2023	Music	Ash Island, Kingdom, Yao Chen
2024	Music	Bibi
2025	Television / Film	Jeong Yun-ho
2025	Music	AllDay Project

=== Best Actor Award ===
Ed.	Year	Winner
3rd	2018	Ju Ji-hoon, Yoo Yeon-seok, IU
4th	2019	Ji Chang-wook
5th	2020	Ahn Hyo-seop, Lee Sung-kyung
6th	2021	Park Joo-mi, Heo Sung-tae, Kim Joo-ryoung
7th	2022	Lee Jae-wook, Kim Se-jeong, Lee Jun-young, Kwon Yu-ri
8th	2023	Ahn Hyo-seop, Kim Se-jeong
9th	2024	Suho, Kim Hye-yoon
10th	2025	Lee Hye-ri, Cha Joo-young, Lee Jun-young, Choo Young-woo

=== Best Creator Award ===
Year	Winner
2017	Shin Won-ho for Reply series
2018	Won Dong-yeon
2021	Brave Brothers
2023	3RACHA
2024	Seo Hyun-joo (Starship Entertainment)
2025	3RACHA

=== Best Emotive Award ===
Year	Category	Winner
2018	Television / Film	Jung Hae-in, Lee Sung-kyung, Lee Jun-ho
2019	Television / Film	Lim Ji-yeon
2019	Music	Kang Daniel
2020	Television / Film	Kim Seon-ho, Ahn Bo-hyun
2020	Music	NCT Dream, (G)I-dle
2021	Television / Film	Moon Ga-young, Cha Eun-woo
2021	Music	Kwon Eun-bi, WJSN Chocome
2022	Television / Film	Na In-woo
2022	Music	Nmixx, Cravity
2023	Television / Film	Suho
2023	Music	&Team, BoyNextDoor, Oneus
2024	Television / Film	Jo Yu-ri
2024	Music	Tony Yu
2025	Television / Film	Kang You-seok
2025	Music	Riize

=== Best History of Songs Award ===
Ed.	Year	Winner
3rd	2018	Se7en
5th	2020	Super Junior
6th	2021	3JSB

=== Best Musician Award ===
Year	Winner
2018	Zico, iKon
2019	NU'EST
2020	Song Ga-in, Kang Daniel, Iz*One
2021	Kang Daniel, Itzy, Astro, Wonho, The Boyz
2022	Le Sserafim, Peck, Yena, Treasure, NiziU
2023	Zerobaseone, Sakurazaka46, Kwon Eun-bi, Kard, STAYC
2024	Zerobaseone, Kiss of Life, Bibi, Jimin
2025	TWS, Kiss of Life, MEOVV, Yena, Ash Island, Chanmina

=== Best Producer Award ===
Year	Winner
2016	Bang Si-hyuk (Big Hit Entertainment)
2018	Pdogg (Big Hit Entertainment)
2019	Zico (KOZ Entertainment)
2021	Woozi (Pledis Entertainment)
2022	Seo Hyun-joo (Starship Entertainment)
2023	Seo Hyun-joo (Starship Entertainment)
2024	Bumzu (Pledis Entertainment)
2025	3Racha (JYP Entertainment)

=== Best Choice Award ===
Year	Category	Winner
2016	Television / Film	Sung Hoon, Lee Si-young
2016	Music	Dynamic Duo
2017	Television / Film	Min Hyo-rin, Lee Tae-im, Kent Tsai
2017	Music	Just Jerk
2018	Television / Film	Jasper Liu, Kwak Si-yang, Jinyoung
2018	Music	Snuper
2019	Television / Film	Lee Jung-eun, Ahn Hyo-seop
2019	Music	Momoland
2020	Television / Film	Ahn Bo-hyun, Park Ju-hyun
2020	Music	The Boyz, Itzy
2021	Television / Film	Lee Jun-young, Joo Suk-tae
2021	Music	Pentagon, Golden Child, Momoland
2022	Television / Film	Kim Seon-ho
2022	Music	WJSN Chocome, Kard, Stray Kids, Kep1er, Pentagon
2024	Television / Film	Jo Yu-ri
2024	Music	Doyoung, Ten
2025	Television / Film	Lee Yi-kyung
2025	Music	Hyunjin, Hongjoong, Shuhua, Kim Chaewon

=== Hot Trend Award ===
Year	Category	Winner
2018	Television / Film	Yoona, Jung Hae-in
2021	Television / Film	Lee Jung-jae
2021	Music	Brave Girls, aespa
2022	Television / Film	Lee Jun-ho, Park Min-young
2022	Music	IVE, NiziU, Lim Young-woong, Seventeen
2023	Television / Film	Ahn Hyo-seop, Lee Jun-ho
2023	Music	NewJeans, SB19
2024	Television / Film	Kim Soo-hyun
2025	Television / Film	IU

=== Potential Award ===
Year	Category	Winner
2019	Television / Film	Jung Hae-in
2019	Music	Kang Daniel, Snuper
2020	Television / Film	Park Jin-young, Kim Hye-yoon
2020	Music	Cravity, Iz*One
2021	Television / Film	Hwang Min-hyun
2021	Music	T1419, AleXa
2022	Television / Film	Kang Daniel
2022	Music	Lightsum, TFN, Kingdom, Billlie
2023	Television / Film	Yoo Seon-ho
2023	Music	ATBO, Lapillus, Paul Blanco
2024	Television / Film	Choi Bo-min
2024	Music	NCT Wish
2025	Music	Xikers

=== AAA Scene Stealer ===
Year	Winner
2019	Lee Jung-eun, Lee Kwang-soo
2020	Kim Min-jae
2021	Cha Ji-yeon
2022	Ryu Kyung-soo
2023	Jung Sung-il
2024	Kim Min
2025	Choi Dae-hoon

=== AAA Top of Kpop Record ===
Year	Winner
2019	Super Junior

=== AAA Best Achievement Award ===
Year	Winner
2021	NU'EST
2022	Kwon Yu-ri

=== AAA Best of Best Starnews Choeaedol Popularity Award ===
Year	Winner
2020	BTS

=== AAA Hot Issue Award ===
Year	Category	Winner
2020	Television / Film	Kim Soo-hyun, Seo Yea-ji
2020	Music	Lim Young-woong, Itzy

=== Best Acting Performance Award ===
Year	Category	Winner
2020	Television / Film	Lee Joon-hyuk
2020	Television / Film	Jeon Mi-do
2021	Television / Film	Takumi Kitamura, Kwon Yu-ri, Sung Hoon
2022	Television / Film	Bona, Kim Young-dae, Hwang Min-hyun, Choi Si-won
2023	Television / Film	Moon Ga-young, Kim Young-dae, Lee Jun-young, Suho

=== Best Music Video Award ===
Year	Winner
2020	Stray Kids
2021	Everglow
2024	Le Sserafim
2025	Meovv – Hands Up

=== Best Pop Artist Award ===
Year	Winner
2020	MAX
2020	Anne-Marie

=== Best Couple Award ===
Year	Winner
2024	Byeon Woo-seok, Kim Hye-yoon
2025	Park Bo-gum, IU

=== Best Asian Star Award ===
Year	Winner
2024	Kentaro Sakaguchi

=== Best K-pop Record Award ===
Year	Winner
2024	Jungkook, Seventeen, Stray Kids
2025	Ive, Ateez, Stray Kids

=== Best Band Award ===
Year	Winner
2024	DAY6
2025	QWER

=== Best Performance Award ===
Year	Winner
2024	NewJeans – How Sweet
2025	KiiiKiii, Cortis

=== Queen of AAA ===
Year	Winner
2024	Jang Won-young

=== Asia Star Award ===
Year	Winner
2016	Yoona, Park Bo-gum, Exo
2017	Suzy
2025	JJ Lin, Yoona, Satoh Takeru

=== Best Voice Performance ===
Year	Winner
2025	Arden Cho

=== Symbol of AAA ===
Year	Winner
2025	Jang Won-young

=== Grand Presence of K-pop ===
Year	Winner
2025	Jang Won-young, Felix

== 10th anniversary special awards ==
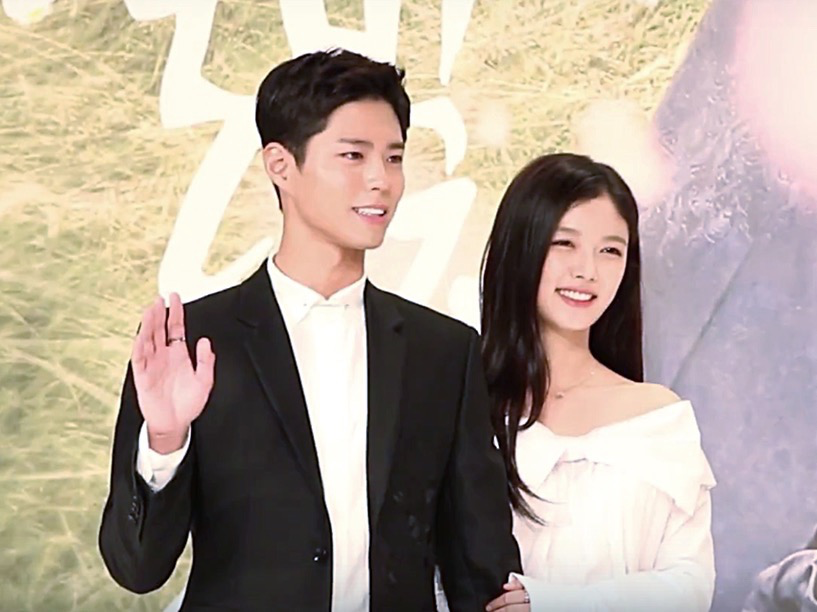
As part of AAA's 10th anniversary celebrations, actors Park Bo-gum (L) and Kim You-jung (R) won the Legendary Couple Award for the series Love in the Moonlight which aired in 2016 – the same year the award show was founded

Year	Winner
2025	Monsta X (History of K-pop)
2025	Bumzu (Legendary Producer)
2025	Seo Hyun-joo of Starship Entertainment (Legendary K-pop Master Professional)
2025	Park Bo-gum, Kim You-jung (Legendary Couple)
2025	Uhm Ji-won (Legendary Actress)
2025	Lee Joon-hyuk (Legendary Actor)
2025	IU (Legendary Female Solo)
2025	G-Dragon (Legendary Male Solo)
2025	Blackpink (Legendary Female Group)
2025	BTS (Legendary Male Group)

== Discontinued awards ==
Best Celebrity Award
Ed.	Year	Category	Winner
1st	2016	Television / Film	Namkoong Min
1st	2016	Television / Film	Kim Ji-won
1st	2016	Television / Film	Jin Goo
1st	2016	Music	VIXX
1st	2016	Music	AOA
2nd	2017	Television / Film	Lee Jun-ho
2nd	2017	Television / Film	Park Min-young
2nd	2017	Music	VIXX
2nd	2017	Music	Apink
3rd	2018	Television / Film	Suzy
4th	2019	Music	Up10tion

AAA X Dongnam Media & FPT Polytechnic Popularity
Ed.	Year	Category	Winner
4th	2019	Television/Film	Oh Se-hun
4th	2019	Television/Film	Song Ji-hyo
4th	2019	Music	Super Junior

Best Vietnamese Artist
Ed.	Year	Category	Winner
4th	2019	Television / Film	Quốc Trường
4th	2019	Television / Film	Bảo Thanh
4th	2019	Music	Bích Phương

Best Popular Award
Ed.	Year	Category	Winner
3rd	2018	Television / Film	Lee Seung-gi
3rd	2018	Television / Film	Ryu Jun-yeol
3rd	2018	Music	Got7

Best Social Award
Ed.	Year	Category	Winner
4th	2019	Television / Film	Yoona
4th	2019	Music	SEVENTEEN
4th	2019	Music	Twice

AAA Best K-Culture
Ed.	Year	Category	Winner
4th	2019	Television / Film	Lee Kwang-soo
4th	2019	Music	Got7

Best Entertainer Award
Ed.	Year	Category	Winner
1st	2016	Television / Film	Seo Kang-joon
1st	2016	Television / Film	Nam Ji-hyun
1st	2016	Music	B.A.P
1st	2016	Music	Mamamoo
2nd	2017	Television / Film	Sung Hoon
2nd	2017	Television / Film	Kim Tae-ri
2nd	2017	Music	NU'EST W
2nd	2017	Music	Monsta X
2nd	2017	Music	Bolbbalgan4

Best Welcome Award
Ed.	Year	Winner
2nd	2017	Lee Seung-gi

Brilliant Award
Ed.	Year	Category	Winner
3rd	2018	Television / Film	Lee Da-hee
3rd	2018	Television / Film	Choi Min-ho
3rd	2018	Music	AOA

Best Star Award
Ed.	Year	Category	Winner
1st	2016	Television / Film	Park Bo-gum
1st	2016	Television / Film	Bae Suzy
1st	2016	Music	Block B
1st	2016	Music	SEVENTEEN
2nd	2017	Television / Film	Park Seo-joon
2nd	2017	Television / Film	Ryu Jun-yeol
2nd	2017	Music	Zico
2nd	2017	Music	7SENSES (SNH48)

Rising Award
Ed.	Year	Category	Winner
3rd	2018	Television / Film	Cha Eun-woo
3rd	2018	Television / Film	Jung In-sun
3rd	2018	Music	Fromis 9
3rd	2018	Music	SF9
4th	2019	Music	Lovelyz

Eco Creator Award
Ed.	Year	Winner
3rd	2018	Park Hae-jin

Legend Award
Ed.	Year	Winner
2nd	2017	Super Junior

Favorite Award
Ed.	Year	Category	Winner
3rd	2018	Television / Film	Sung Hoon
3rd	2018	Music	Chungha

Samsung Pay Award
Ed.	Year	Winner
2nd	2017	Wanna One

Rising Star Award
Ed.	Year	Category	Winner
1st	2016	Television / Film	Park Hye-su
1st	2016	Television / Film	Shin Hyun-soo
1st	2016	Television / Film	Chi Pu
1st	2016	Music	WJSN
1st	2016	Music	Han Dong-geun
1st	2016	Music	Boys and Men
2nd	2017	Television / Film	Kang Tae-oh
2nd	2017	Television / Film	Ji Soo
2nd	2017	Television / Film	Seo Eun-soo
2nd	2017	Music	JBJ
2nd	2017	Music	DIA
2nd	2017	Music	Jeong Se-woon
2nd	2017	Music	Gugudan
2nd	2017	Music	Momoland

Asia Icon
Ed.	Year	Winner
2nd	2017	Park Shin-hye

Baidu Star Award
Ed.	Year	Winner
1st	2016	Exo

Korean Tourism Appreciation Award
Ed.	Year	Category	Winner
3rd	2018	Television / Film	Lee Byung-hun
3rd	2018	Music	BTS

Asia Hot Artist
Ed.	Year	Winner
3rd	2018	Wanna One, IU

Best Music Award
Ed.	Year	Winner
3rd	2018	NU'EST W
3rd	2018	Mamamoo
3rd	2018	Sunmi

AAA Groove
Ed.	Year	Winner
4th	2019	(G)I-dle
4th	2019	Stray Kids
5th	2020	Bigman

Best Performance Director
Ed.	Year	Winner
3rd	2018	Son Sung Deuk

Artist of the Year
Ed.	Year	Category	Winner
3rd	2018	Television / Film	Lee Sung-kyung
3rd	2018	Television / Film	Lee Jun-ho
3rd	2018	Television / Film	Ryu Jun-yeol
3rd	2018	Television / Film	IU
3rd	2018	Television / Film	Jung Hae-in
3rd	2018	Television / Film	Lee Seung-gi
3rd	2018	Television / Film	Ju Ji-hoon
3rd	2018	Television / Film	Yoo Yeon-seok
3rd	2018	Television / Film	Ha Jung-woo
3rd	2018	Television / Film	Lee Byung-hun
3rd	2018	Music	Zico
3rd	2018	Music	Wanna One
3rd	2018	Music	iKon
3rd	2018	Music	Twice
3rd	2018	Music	SEVENTEEN
3rd	2018	Music	Sunmi
3rd	2018	Music	Monsta X
3rd	2018	Music	Mamamoo
3rd	2018	Music	Got7
3rd	2018	Music	NU'EST W
3rd	2018	Music	BTS

U+Idol Live Popularity Award
Ed.	Year	Winner
6th	2021	IU, Lim Young-woong, Blackpink, BTS

== Most wins ==
Rank	Recipients	Wins
1st	Stray Kids	17
2nd	Seventeen, BTS	14
3rd	Lim Young-woong, Lee Jun-ho	12
4th	NewJeans, IU, Yoona	11
5th	TWICE, Kim Seon-ho, EXO	9
6th	Kang Daniel, ITZY, IVE	8
7th	Park Bo-gum, LE SSERAFIM, Park Min-young	7
8th	The Boyz, Byeon Woo-seok, Kim Soo-hyun, Jang Won-young, Monsta X, Kim Hye-yoon	6
9th	Got7, Mamamoo, Super Junior, Zico, Wanna One, Jung Hae-in, Ahn Hyo-seop, NCT 127, Ateez	5
10th	Blackpink, Lee Byung-hun, Momoland, Lee Jung-Jae, Lee Jun-young, Kwon Yu-ri, Kim Se-jeong, Kentaro Sakaguchi, Zerobaseone, Aespa, Suho, KARD, NiziU	4

== See also ==
- List of Asian television awards
