= 2024 APAN Star Awards =

10th edition of award ceremony

- Official poster
- Date: December 28, 2024
- Site: Dongdaemun Design Plaza Arthall 1, Jung-gu, Seoul
- Presented by: Korea Entertainment Management Association; Seoul Economic Promotion Agency
- Hosted by: Kim Seung-woo; Park Sun-young

Highlights
- Most awards: Lovely Runner (6)
- Most nominations: Queen of Tears (10)
- Grand Prize: Kim Tae-ri
- Drama of the Year: Jeongnyeon: The Star Is Born
- Website: APAN Star Awards

Television/radio coverage
- Network: tvN; BigK

The 2024 APAN Star Awards ceremony took place on December 28, 2024, at Dongdaemun Design Plaza Arthall 1 Jung-gu, Seoul. The 10th anniversary award show was hosted by Kim Seung-woo and Park Sun-young and broadcast exclusively on tvN and BigK. The awards ceremony integrates content from all channels, including domestic terrestrial broadcasting, general programming, cable, OTT, and web dramas, aired from October 2023 to November 2024.

At the awards ceremony, Kim Tae-ri received the Daesang for her performance in Jeongnyeon: The Star Is Born while the drama itself was awarded with the title of Best Drama of the Year.

== Winners and nominees ==
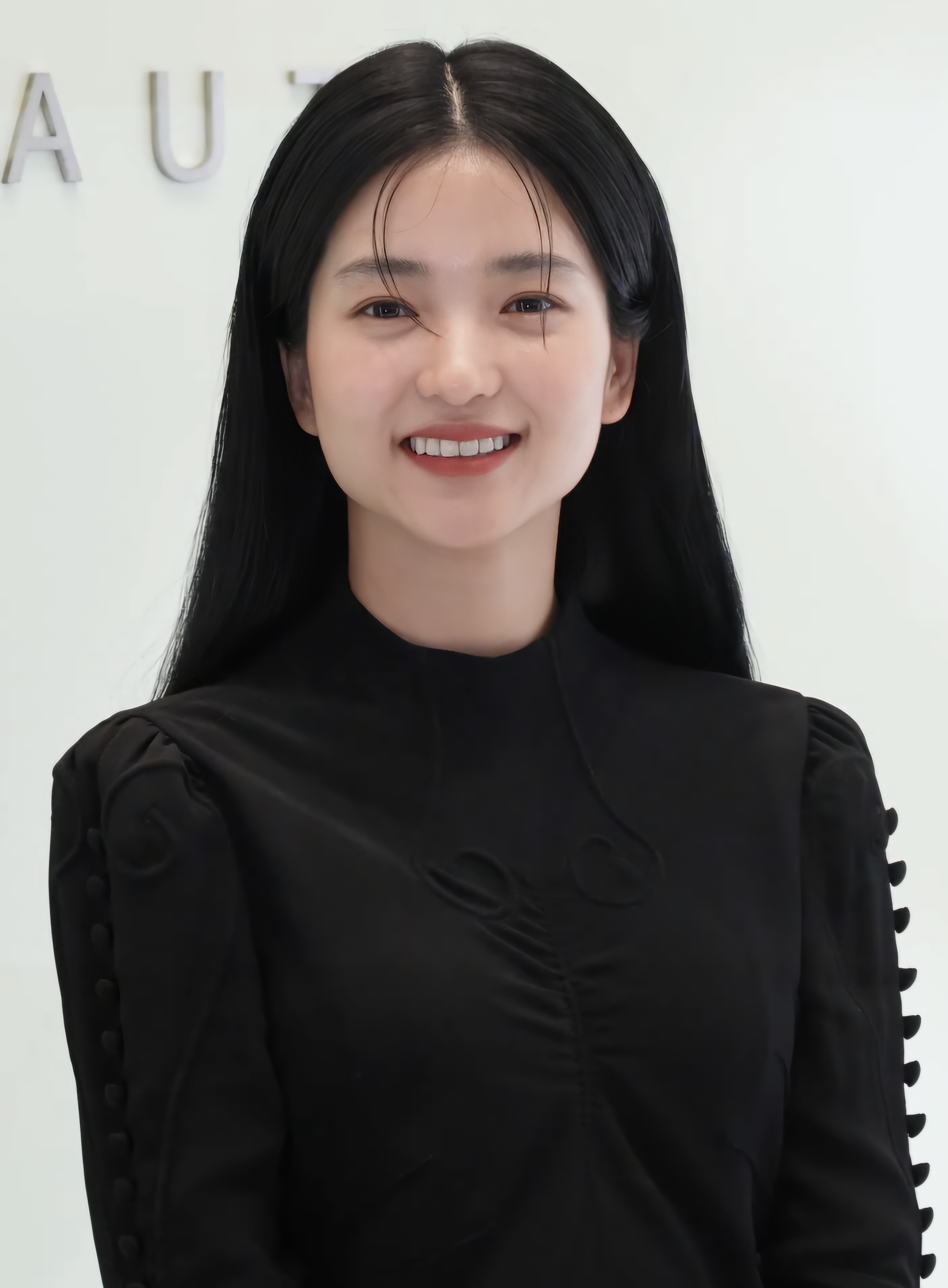
Kim Tae-ri, winner of Grand Prize

Nominations were announced on December 3. Winners are listed first and denoted in bold.

**Grand Prize (Daesang)**: **Kim Tae-ri– Jeongnyeon: The Star Is Born**	**Drama of the Year**: **Jeongnyeon: The Star Is Born** (tvN); Korea–Khitan War (KBS2); Good Partner (SBS TV); Queen of Tears (tvN); Boyhood (Coupang Play)
**Best Director**: **Lee Myoungwoo – Boyhood**; Song Yeon-hwa – Doubt; Yoon Jong-ho – Lovely Runner; Jeon Woo-sung – Korea–Khitan War; Jung Ji-in – Jeongnyeon: The Star Is Born	**Best Screenwriter**: **Choi Yu-na – Good Partner**; Park Kyung-hwa – The Midnight Romance in Hagwon; Park Ji-eun – Queen of Tears; Lee Nam-gyu – Daily Dose of Sunshine; Lee Si-eun – Lovely Runner; Choi Hyo-bi – Jeongnyeon: The Star Is Born
**Top Excellence Award, Actor in a Miniseries**: **Ji Chang-wook – Welcome to Samdal-ri**; Kim Soo-hyun – Queen of Tears; Byeon Woo-seok – Lovely Runner; Im Si-wan – Boyhood; Ji Sung – Connection	**Top Excellence Award, Actress in a Miniseries**: **Lee Hanee – Knight Flower**; Kim Ji-won – Queen of Tears; Kim Tae-ri– Jeongnyeon: The Star Is Born; Kim Hye-yoon – Lovely Runner; Jang Na-ra – Good Partner and My Happy End
**Excellence Award, Actor in a Miniseries**: **Lee Yi-kyung – Marry My Husband**; Ahn Bo-hyun – Flex X Cop; Byun Yo-han – Black Out; Lee Dong-hwi – Chief Detective 1958; Lee Jong-won – Knight Flower	**Excellence Award, Actress in a Miniseries**: **Jung Eun-chae – Jeongnyeon: The Star Is Born and Your Honor**; Go Min-si – The Frog and Sweet Home 2; Park Shin-hye – The Judge from Hell; Shin Ye-eun – Jeongnyeon: The Star Is Born; Lee Mi-sook – Queen of Tears
**Top Excellence Award, Actor in a Serial Drama**: **Ji Hyun-woo – Beauty and Mr. Romantic**; Kim Jung-hyun — Iron Family; Baek Sung-hyun – Suji & Uri; Um Ki-joon – The Escape of the Seven; Choi Soo-jong – Korea–Khitan War	**Top Excellence Award, Actress in a Serial Drama**: **Im Soo-hyang — Beauty and Mr. Romantic**; Keum Sae-rok — Iron Family; Uhm Hyun-kyung — The Brave Yong Su-jeong; Uee — Live Your Own Life; Ham Eun-jung — Suji & Uri
**Excellence Award, Actor in a Serial Drama**: **Kim Dong-jun — Korea–Khitan War**; Seo Jun-young – The Brave Yong Su-jeong; Yoon Sun-woo – The Third Marriage; Lee Won-jong – Korea–Khitan War; Ji Seung-hyun – Korea–Khitan War	**Excellence Award, Actress in a Serial Drama**: **Oh Hyun-kyung — Suji & Uri**; Yoon Hae-young – The Third Marriage; Lee Hyo-na – Unpredictable Family; Lim Ju-eun – The Brave Yong Su-jeong; Cha Hwa-yeon – Beauty and Mr. Romantic
**Excellence Award, Actor in a Short Drama**: **Lee Sang-woon – O'PENing: My Trouble-Maker Mom**; Kim Seon-ho — The Tyrant; Lee Sang-yi – Spice Up Our Love; Jung Sang-hoon – The Pork Cutlets	**Excellence Award, Actress in a Short Drama**: **Jung In-sun – Grand Shining Hotel**; Kim Jung-young – O'PENing: My Trouble-Maker Mom; Jeon Hye-bin – The Pork Cutlets; Han Ji-hyun – Spice Up Our Love
**Excellence Acting Award, Actor**: **Jeon Bae-soo - Queen of Tears**; **Seo Hyun-chul – Welcome to Samdal-ri and Boyhood**; Kwak Dong-yeon — Queen of Tears; Kim In-kwon – The Judge from Hell; Park Ji-hwan – Queen Woo and Seoul Busters; Yoo Jae-myung – Uncle Samsik and No Way Out: The Roulette	**Excellence Acting Award, Actress**: **Kim Jung-nan – Queen of Tears**; **Jung Young-joo – Lovely Runner and Miss Night and Day**; Seo Yi-sook – Red Swan; Lee Jung-eun – Miss Night and Day; Lee Hye-young – Bitter Sweet Hell; Han Ye-ri – Doubt
**Best New Actor**: **Roh Jae-won — Doubt and Daily Dose of Sunshine**; **Kim Jung-jin – Boyhood**; Baek Seo-hoo — Miss Night and Day; Lee Seung-hyub – Lovely Runner; Lee Si-woo – Boyhood; Heo Nam-joon – Sweet Home 3 and Your Honor	**Best New Actress**: **Kang Mi-na — Welcome to Samdal-ri**; **Chae Won-bin – Doubt**; Kang Hye-won – Boyhood; Geum Hae-na – A Shop for Killers; Jang Da-ah – Pyramid Game; Jo Yoon-su — The Tyrant
**Best Child Actor**: **Lee Joo-won – Queen of Tears and My Sweet Mobster**; Kim Kang-hoon — Goodbye Earth and Death's Game; Moon Seong-hyun – Queen of Tears; Shin Seo-woo – Family by Choice	**Best Child Actress**: **Park So-yi – The Atypical Family**; Kim Do-eun – Welcome to Samdal-ri; Ahn Se-bin – A Shop for Killers; Oh Eun-seo – Perfect Family
**Popularity Star Award, Actor**: **Byeon Woo-seok — Lovely Runner**; Kim Soo-hyun – Queen of Tears; Cha Eun-woo – Wonderful World; Park Hyung-sik – Doctor Slump; Lee Joon-hyuk – Dongjae, the Good or the Bastard; Lee Je-hoon – Chief Detective 1958; Son Suk-ku – A Killer Paradox; Byun Yo-han – Black Out and Uncle Samsik	**Popularity Star Award, Actress**: **Kim Hye-yoon — Lovely Runner**; Kim Ji-won – Queen of Tears; Shin Hye-sun — Welcome to Samdal-ri; Jang Na-ra — Good Partner; Shin Min-ah — No Gain No Love; Kim Yoo-jung — My Demon
**Global Star Award**: **Byeon Woo-seok**; Song Kang; Kentaro Sakaguchi; Go Min-si; Shin Ye-eun; Park Jae-chan	**Best Couple Award**: **Byeon Woo-seok and Kim Hye-yoon – Lovely Runner**; Kim Soo-hyun and Kim Ji-won – Queen of Tears; Jung Hae-in and Jung So-min – Love Next Door; Lee Se-young and Kentaro Sakaguchi – What Comes After Love; Song Kang and Kim Yoo-jung – My Demon
**Best Entertainer Award**: **Kang Daniel**; Do Kyung-soo; Cha Eun-woo; Park Jae-chan; Yoon Bo-mi	**Best Original Soundtrack**: **Eclipse – Lovely Runner – "Sudden Shower"**; Boo Seok-soon – Queen of Tears – "The Reasons of My Smiles"; Taeyeon – Welcome to Samdal-ri – "Dream"; N.Flying – Lovely Runner – "Star"; Zerobaseone – Love Next Door – "Reaching for You"
**Achievement Award**: **Kim Young-ok**	**Korea Creative Award**: **RalRal**
