= Sudden Shower =

Song by Eclipse

from the album Lovely Runner OST
- Released: April 8, 2024
- Studio: CSmusic& (Seoul)
- Length: 3:53
- Label: Bon Factory; Stone Music
- Composers: Han Sung-ho; Park Soo-seok; Moon Kim (Room01)
- Lyricists: Han Sung-ho; Sooyoon

Music video
- "Sudden Shower" on YouTube

"Sudden Shower" (Korean: 소나기; RR: Sonagi) is a song by fictional musical band Eclipse, consisting of Byeon Woo-seok as vocalist, Lee Seung-hyub as guitarist, Yang Hyuk as bassist, and Moon Yong-suk as drummer, from South Korean television series Lovely Runner (2024). It was first released on April 8, 2024, as part of the EP Lovely Runner OST Part 1, and later included on the soundtrack album to the series.

== Background ==
Fictionally, "Sudden Shower" is a self-written and composed song by Ryu Sun-jae (Byeon Woo-seok), in the time slip romantic comedy television series Lovely Runner. The song was inspired by the memories of his first love, Im Sol (Kim Hye-yoon), before he embarked on his music career.

== Reception ==
"Sudden Shower" peaked at number four on the South Korean Circle Digital Chart and number 167 on the Billboard Global 200. The song received Melon Music Awards for Best OST, and APAN Star Awards for Best Soundtrack, as well as MAMA Awards for Favourite Global Trending Music.

== Accolades ==
Award ceremony	Year	Nominee / Work	Result	Ref.
APAN Star Awards	2024	Best OST	Won	
Asia Artist Awards	2024	Best OST, Byeon Woo-seok	Won	
Asia Contents Awards & Global OTT Awards	2024	Best OST	Nominated	
Asia Star Entertainer Awards	2025	Best OST	Won	
Asian Television Awards	2024	Best Theme Song	Nominated	
Korea Drama Awards	2024	Best OST	Nominated	
MAMA Awards	2024	Favourite Global Trending Music	Won	
MAMA Awards	2024	Best OST	Nominated	
MAMA Awards	2024	Song of the Year	Nominated	
Melon Music Awards	2024	Best OST	Won	

== Credits ==
- Byeon Woo-seok – vocals
- Han Sung-ho – lyrics, composition
- Sooyoon – lyrics
- Park Soo-seok – composition
- Moon Kim (Room01) – composition
- Jung Jin-wook – arrangement, keyboard, drum programming
- Young – guitar
- Go Jin-young – bass
- Kim Min-hee – digital editing
- On Seong-yoon – recording
- Lee Yu-jin – mixing
- Park Joon – mastering
- Do Jung-hoe – mastering

== Charts ==
=== Weekly charts ===
Weekly chart performance for "Sudden Shower"
Chart (2024)	Peak position
Global 200 (Billboard)	167
Singapore Regional (RIAS)	16
South Korea (Circle)	4

=== Monthly charts ===
Monthly chart performance for "Sudden Shower"
Chart (2024)	Position
South Korea (Circle)	5

=== Year-end charts ===
Year-end chart performance for "Sudden Shower"
Chart (2024)	Position
South Korea (Circle)	15
