= Soulmate (2023 film) =

2023 South Korean romantic drama film

- Theatrical release poster
- Hangul: 소울메이트
- RR: Soulmeiteu
- MR: Soulmeit'ŭ
- Directed by: Min Yong-geun
- Screenplay by: Kang Hyun-joo; Min Yong-geun
- Based on: Soul Mate by Derek Tsang
- Produced by: Byun Seung-min
- Starring: Kim Da-mi; Jeon So-nee; Byeon Woo-seok
- Cinematography: Kang Gook-hyun
- Edited by: Han Mi-yeon
- Music by: Mowg
- Production companies: Climax Studio; Andmarq Studio; Studio&NEW; KeyEast
- Distributed by: Next Entertainment World; Wide Lens Pictures
- Release date: 15 March 2023
- Running time: 124 minutes
- Country: South Korea
- Language: Korean
- Box office: US$2.5 million

Soulmate (Korean: 소울메이트) is a 2023 South Korean romantic drama film directed by Min Yong-geun starring Kim Da-mi, Jeon So-nee and Byeon Woo-seok. The film, adapted from the Chinese film with the same name, deals with the essence of human relationships through 14 years of meeting and parting, friendship and love, longing and jealousy between two friends who first met at the age of 13. It was released theatrically on March 15, 2023. It premiered at the 28th Busan International Film Festival on October 5, 2023.

== Overview ==
The film depicts the ups and downs of the relationship that two women born in 1988, Mi-so (Kim Da-mi) and Ha-eun (Jeon So-nee) go through as they grow up. The world between the two of them suffers a crack when there is a misunderstanding about their classmate, Jin-woo (Byeon Woo-seok) in their late teens. The free-spirited Mi-so leaves for the city to pursue an adventurous life while Ha-eun stays in her hometown to lead a stable life but still both remain in touch. Ha-eun continues her relationship with Jin-woo but decides to run away on their wedding day before exchanging vows and is pregnant with their child. Ha-eun and Mi-so get in touch soon after. Ha-eun dies during childbirth and Mi-so cares for her daughter and names her Ha-eun. Mi-so also finishes Ha-eun works and creates an exhibit to honour Ha-eun while keeping the death of Ha-eun a secret from Jin-woo.

== Cast ==
- Kim Da-mi as Ahn Mi-so, Ha-eun's best friend since childhood
  - Kim Soo-hyung as young Mi-so
- Jeon So-nee as Go Ha-eun, Miso's bestfriend since childhood
  - Ryu Ji-an as young Ha-eun
- Byeon Woo-seok as Ham Jin-woo, Ha-eun's crush and later became her boyfriend.
- Heo Ji-na as Mrs.Ahn, Mi-so's mother
- Jang Hye-jin as Mrs.Go, Ha-eun's mother
- Park Chung-seon as Mr.Go, Ha-eun's father
- Nam Yoon-su as Ki-hoon, Mi-so's boyfriend
- Kang Mal-geum as a curator at an art museum
- Oh Min-ae as Yeong-ok
- Park Sung-yeon as Seong-yeon
- Hyun Bong-sik as the owner of a fancy shop

== Production ==
Principal photography began in August 2020 and ended in November 2020.

== Reception ==
=== Box office ===
As of January 24, 2024, Soulmate has grossed $1.7 million with a running total of 234,775 tickets sold. (Kr: The movie achieved a cumulative audience of 234,556 people and a cumulative box office revenue of 2,266,169,069 won.)

== Accolades ==
=== Awards and nominations ===
Award ceremony	Year	Category	Nominee	Result	Ref.
Bechdel Day	2023	Bechdel Choice 10 — Film	Soulmate	Top 10	
Golden Cinematography Awards	2023	Special Jury Award	Jeon So-nee	Won	
Grand Bell Awards	2023	Best New Actor	Byeon Woo-seok	Nominated	
