= Kim Hye-yoon =

South Korean actress (born 1996)

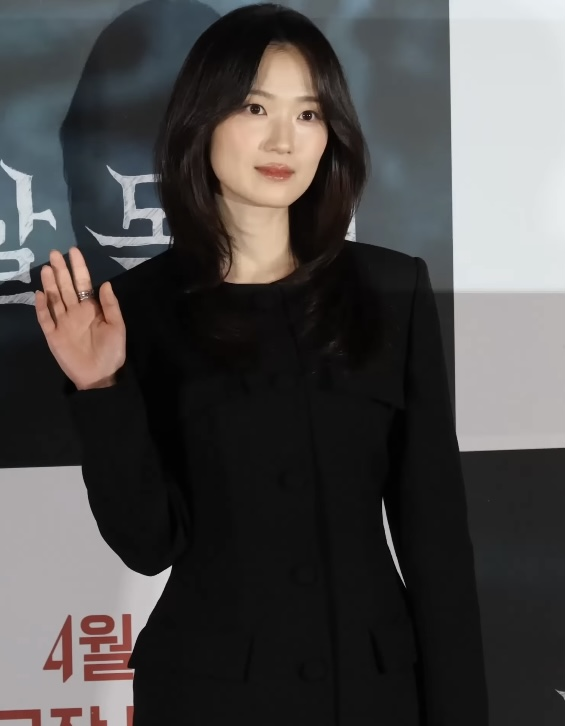
- Kim in 2026
- Born: November 10, 1996 (age 29); Seongnam, South Korea
- Education: Konkuk University (B.A. in Film Studies)
- Occupation: Actress
- Years active: 2013–present
- Agent: Artist Company

Korean name
- Hangul: 김혜윤
- RR: Gim Hyeyun
- MR: Kim Hyeyun
- Website: Official website

Signature
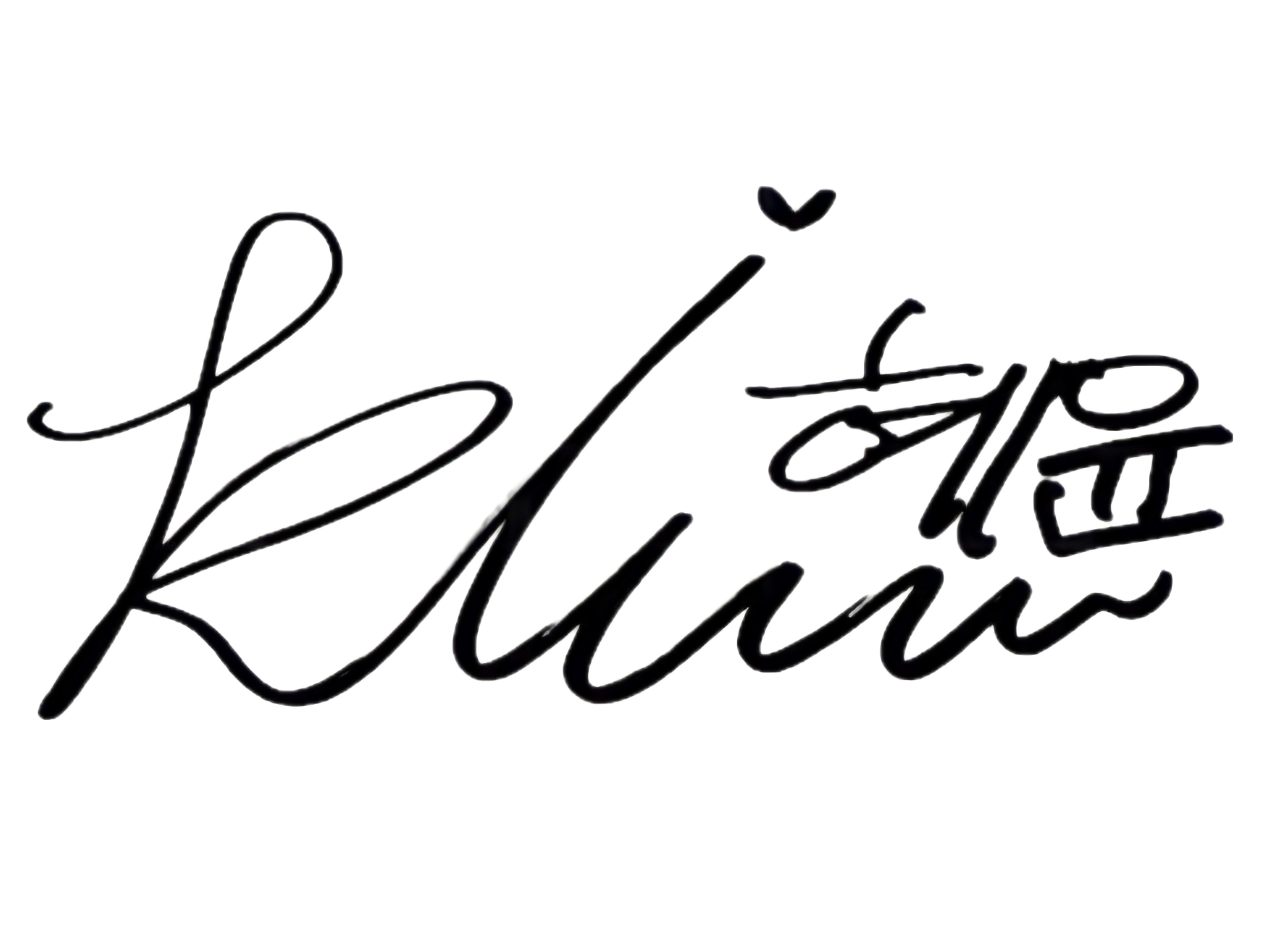

Kim Hye-yoon (Korean: 김혜윤; born November 10, 1996) is a South Korean actress. She gained recognition for her role as Kang Ye-seo in JTBC's television series Sky Castle (2018–2019), before landing her first leading roles in both television and film including Extraordinary You (2019) and The Girl on a Bulldozer (2022). Her notable accolades include awards from the Baeksang Arts Awards, Blue Dragon Film Awards, and Grand Bell Awards.

== Early life and education ==
Kim was born on November 10, 1996, in Seongnam, South Korea. She aspired to become an actress since her third year of middle school and attended an acting academy, auditioned frequently, and took on small roles in preparation for her acting career.

She graduated from Seonil Girls' High School and entered Konkuk University in 2015 (Department of Film Studies). While balancing her studies and acting career, she received a merit-based full-ride scholarship and participated in student film projects. She graduated in February 2019 with a bachelor's degree in film studies.

== Career ==
=== 2013–2018: Career beginnings ===
Kim debuted as an actress in the 2013 KBS2 TV Novel's Samsaengi, playing the teenage version of a supporting character. After gaining recognition for her role in the 2014 OCN's crime thriller Bad Guys, Kim focused on her studies and only took minor roles to avoid affecting her academic performance, as she had received a full scholarship in 2015 to Konkuk University. Her significant role during this period was a supporting character in the 2017 mystery thriller film Memoir of a Murderer.

=== 2019–2021: Rising popularity and transition to lead roles ===
Leading up to her college graduation in February 2019, Kim began auditioning for more prominent roles. She successfully landed the role of Kang Ye-seo in JTBC's satirical drama Sky Castle, being selected from a pool of 200 applicants. The drama's success contributed to her rising popularity and earned her the Best New Actress award at the 55th Baeksang Arts Awards.

In 2019, Kim starred as the protagonist for the first time with MBC's school fantasy drama Extraordinary You, based on the Daum webtoon July Found by Chance. She received further recognition, winning both New and Excellence Actress at the MBC Drama Awards. During the same year, she was cast as one of the lead in the psychological thriller film Midnight.

Kim received her first leading film role in the 2020 production The Girl on a Bulldozer. In the same year, she also confirmed to star in the 2021 pre-produced JTBC's television series Snowdrop, in which she reunited with the production team of hit drama Sky Castle.

In April 2021, Kim received the offer to star in tvN's historical procedural drama Secret Royal Inspector & Joy. The television series premiered ahead of Snowdrop.

=== 2022–2025: Breakthrough ===
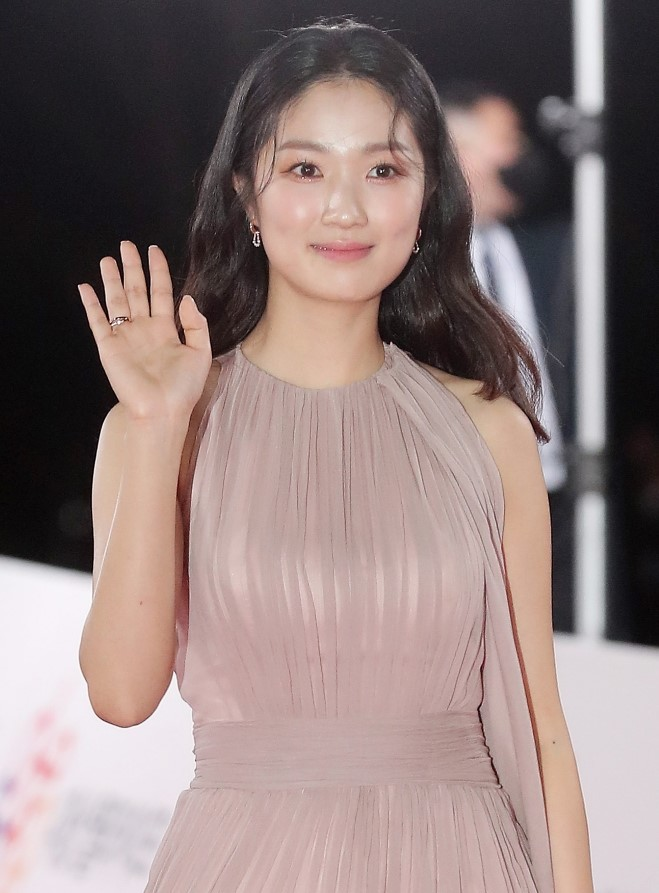
Kim at the Blue Dragon Film Awards in 2022

In 2022, The Girl on a Bulldozer was released theatrically, and Kim's performance as Goo Hye-young has received critical acclaim and garnered her several awards from award ceremonies such as the Blue Dragon Film Awards and Grand Bell Awards for Best New Actress, as well as the Rising Star Asia Award at the New York Asian Film Festival. Notably, Kim was also nominated for the Best New Actress Film category at the 59th Baeksang Arts Awards. With the film's success, Kim earned a total of ten nominations, winning six of them. Her achievements were further recognized by Forbes, which featured her in their Forbes 30 Under 30 list.

After focusing on the promotion and production of her two films The Girl on a Bulldozer and Ditto throughout 2022, Kim returned to the small screen with 2024 tvN's time slip drama Lovely Runner. Her performance in the series garnered praise from both critics and audiences, with media outlets describing her as an "Actress You Can Trust" within the Korean entertainment industry. The role earned her first ever nomination for Best Actress category at the 61st Baeksang Arts Awards. She was also placed 30th under Forbes Korea Power Celebrity 40 list.

=== 2026–present: Box office success and genre expansion ===
Kim was later cast in the SBS‘s fantasy drama No Tail to Tell, which aired in January 2026. On April 8, she made her big-screen comeback after four years with the folk horror film Salmokji: Whispering Water, which became a box office success in South Korea and marked her first commercially successful film. Her performance received positive reviews, with media outlets dubbing her as the "Horror Queen" and praising her immersive acting and versatility, and further proving her ability to transition across different genres.

She is also confirmed to star in several upcoming projects, including the crime film Three of a Kind and the action comedy film High School Detective. She is additionally set to appear in the SBS's legal drama Good Partner 2 and the Disney+ Korean adaptation of the Japanese novel The Miracles of the Namiya General Store.

== Public image ==
After her portrayal as Kang Ye-seo in the television series Sky Castle, Kim earned the nickname "My Melody Princess". This moniker stemmed from her character's fashion choices, which closely resembled the Sanrio character, My Melody.

She has also been dubbed by various Korean media as the "Nation's Little Sister".

== Endorsements ==
With her breakthrough, in 2019, Kim went on to endorse for Ildong Pharmaceutical's vitamin supplement brand Aronamin, Lotte Hi-Mart, Ministry of Gender Equality and Family, Shinsegae's casual clothing brand Design United, dshare's brand 3J Edu, LG Household & Health Care's derma cosmetics brand Dr. Belmeur, KB Financial Group's credit card service KB Kookmin Card, and Dong-A Pharmaceutical's feminine hygiene brand Tempo.

She has also endorsed for Entrepreneur Game application "Live Goddess" (2021), KB Financial Group's mobile payment application KB Pay (2021), Avène (2021), Batiste (2021), and Mentholatum's cosmetics brand Acnes (2023).

In April 2024, she went to endorse for Lotte Chilsung's liquor brand Saero by dubbing the advertisement of the product. In August of the same year, she was selected to endorse for KGC's representative ginseng brand Jung Kwan Jang, and Lion Corporation Korea's cosmetics brand Rawquest. In October 2024, Kim was chosen to become the new muse of the Kodak Apparel brand. In the same month, she is chosen to endorse for LG Pra.L's Skin Booster product.

== Filmography ==
Selected filmography

- Sky Castle (2018–2019)
- Extraordinary You (2019)
- The Girl on a Bulldozer (2022)
- Lovely Runner (2024)
- Salmokji: Whispering Water (2026)

== Ambassadorship ==
Year	Title	Ref.
2019	Honorary Ambassador for CJ Super Race "Mini Challenge"	
2019	Honorary Ambassador of Seoul's public awareness campaign "Idoo"	
2021	Honorary Ambassador for the 10th Korea Education Donation Fair	
2026	Promotional Ambassador for the Taiwan Tourism Administration	

== Accolades ==
=== Awards and nominations ===
Name of the award ceremony, year presented, category, nominee of the award, and the result of the nomination
Award ceremony	Year	Category	Nominee / Work	Result	Ref.
APAN Star Awards	2021	KT Seezn Star Award	Kim Hye-yoon	Nominated	
APAN Star Awards	2024	Top Excellence Award, Actress in a Miniseries	Lovely Runner	Nominated	
APAN Star Awards	2024	Best Couple Award	Kim Hye-yoon (with Byeon Woo-seok); Lovely Runner	Won	
APAN Star Awards	2024	Popularity Award – Actress	Kim Hye-yoon	Won	
APAN Star Awards	2025	Popularity Award – Actress	Kim Hye-yoon	Won	
Asia Artist Awards	2020	Potential Award	Kim Hye-yoon	Won	
Asia Artist Awards	2024	Best Actor Award	Kim Hye-yoon	Won	
Asia Artist Awards	2024	Popularity Award – Actress	Kim Hye-yoon	Won	
Asia Artist Awards	2024	Best Artist Award	Kim Hye-yoon	Won	
Asia Artist Awards	2024	Best Couple Award	Kim Hye-yoon (with Byeon Woo-seok); Lovely Runner	Won	
Asia Artist Awards	2024	Grand Prize (Daesang)	Kim Hye-yoon	Nominated	
Asia Artist Awards	2025	Popularity Award – Actress	Kim Hye-yoon	Won	
Asia Artist Awards	2026	Popularity Award – Actress	Kim Hye-yoon	Pending	
Asia Contents Awards & Global OTT Awards	2024	People's Choice Award	Kim Hye-yoon	Won	
Asia Contents Awards & Global OTT Awards	2024	Best Lead Actress	Lovely Runner	Nominated	
Asia Model Awards	2019	Rising Star Award	Kim Hye-yoon	Won	
Asia Star Entertainer Awards	2025	Best Artist (Actor)	Kim Hye-yoon	Won	
Asia Star Entertainer Awards	2025	Fan Choice Artist (Actor)	Kim Hye-yoon	Won	
Asia Star Entertainer Awards	2025	Fan Choice (Character)	Kim Hye-yoon (as Im Sol); Lovely Runner	Won	
Asia Star Entertainer Awards	2025	Fan Choice (Couple)	Kim Hye-yoon (with Byeon Woo-seok); Lovely Runner	Nominated	
Asia Star Entertainer Awards	2026	Best Artist (Actor)	Kim Hye-yoon	Won	
Baeksang Arts Awards	2019	Best New Actress – Television	Sky Castle	Won	
Baeksang Arts Awards	2023	Best New Actress – Film	The Girl on a Bulldozer	Nominated	
Baeksang Arts Awards	2025	Best Actress – Television	Lovely Runner	Nominated	
Baeksang Arts Awards	2025	Most Popular Actress	Kim Hye-yoon	Won	
Blue Dragon Film Awards	2022	Best New Actress	The Girl on a Bulldozer	Won	
Blue Dragon Ranking Awards (Note: The Blue Dragon Ranking is a popularity award organized by Sports Chosun, the organizer of the Blue Dragon Film Awards and Blue Dragon Series Awards. It recognizes trend-setting actors by presenting semiannual awards for Best Actor and Best Actress.)	2025	Best Actress Award (Note: Second Half of 2025.)	Lovely Runner	Won	
Blue Dragon Ranking Awards	2026	Best Actress Award (Note: First Half of 2026.)	No Tail to Tell	Won	
Brand of the Year Awards	2024	Actress – Hot Trend	Kim Hye-yoon	Won	
Brand of the Year Awards	2026	Best Actress (Movie)	Kim Hye-yoon	Won	
Buil Film Awards	2022	Best New Actress	The Girl on a Bulldozer	Nominated	
Chunsa Film Art Awards	2022	Best New Actress	The Girl on a Bulldozer	Nominated	
Director's Cut Awards	2023	Best New Actress	The Girl on a Bulldozer	Nominated	
Fundex Awards	2024	Best Actress – TV Drama	Lovely Runner	Nominated	
Golden Cinematography Awards	2022	Jury's Special Award	The Girl on a Bulldozer	Won	
Grand Bell Awards	2022	Best New Actress	The Girl on a Bulldozer	Won	
iMBC Awards (Note: iMBC Awards, hosted by iMBC Entertainment, MBC Group's only entertainment news outlet, honors artists and actors with outstanding achievements in the industry.)	2026	Best Actress	No Tail to Tell	Nominated	
Korea Broadcasting Prizes (Note: The Korea Broadcasting Prizes, which began in 1973 to commemorate Broadcasting Day, is a ceremony awards that honors outstanding broadcast programs and broadcasters.)	2026	Best Actress	No Tail to Tell	Won	
Korea Drama Awards	2024	Excellence Award, Actress	Lovely Runner	Nominated	
Korea Drama Awards	2024	Best Couple Award	Kim Hye-yoon (with Byeon Woo-seok); Lovely Runner	Nominated	
Korea Drama Awards	2024	Global Star Award	Kim Hye-yoon	Nominated	
Korea Drama Awards	2024	Hot Star Award (Female)	Kim Hye-yoon	Nominated	
Korea Drama Awards	2025	Global Star Award	Kim Hye-yoon	Nominated	
Korea Drama Awards	2025	Hot Star Award (Female)	Kim Hye-yoon	Nominated	
Korea First Brand Awards	2019	Rising Star Award, Actress	Kim Hye-yoon	Won	
Korea Trusted Innovation Awards	2024	Culture and Art Innovation Award	Kim Hye-yoon	Won	
Korean Culture and Entertainment Awards	2019	Excellence Award, Actress in a Drama	Sky Castle	Won	
Korean Film Producers Association Awards	2022	Best New Actress	The Girl on a Bulldozer	Won	
MBC Drama Awards	2019	Best New Actress	Extraordinary You	Won	
MBC Drama Awards	2019	Excellence Award, Actress in a Wednesday-Thursday Drama	Extraordinary You	Won	
MBC Drama Awards	2019	Best Couple Award	Kim Hye-yoon (with Rowoon and Lee Jae-wook); Extraordinary You	Nominated	
New York Asian Film Festival	2022	Rising Star Asia Award	The Girl on a Bulldozer	Won	
Seoul Global Movie Awards	2025	Popularity Award – Actress	Kim Hye-yoon	Won	
Seoul International Drama Awards	2024	Outstanding Asian Star (Female)	Kim Hye-yoon	Won	
Seoul International Drama Awards	2026	Outstanding Asian Star (Female)	Kim Hye-yoon	Nominated	
Wildflower Film Awards	2023	Best New Actress	The Girl on a Bulldozer	Won	

=== Honors ===
Name of country or organization, year given, and name of honor or award
Country or Organization	Year	Honor or Award	Ref.
Newsis K-Expo Cultural Awards (Note: Established in 2019 and co-sponsored by Korea's Ministry of Culture, Sports and Tourism, Ministry of Foreign Affairs, Korea Creative Content Agency, Seoul Metropolitan Council and the Seoul Tourism Organization, it awards cultural icons, businesses, and individuals who have contributed greatly to Hallyu, the Korean wave.)	2024	National Assembly Culture, Sports and Tourism Committee Award	

=== Listicles ===
Name of publisher, year listed, name of listicle, and placement
Publisher	Year	Listicle	Placement	Ref.
Asia-Pacific Entrepreneurs Association (APEA)	2025	Asia-Pacific U30 Outstanding Young Leaders	Included	
Cine21	2019	Rising Star	Included	
Cine21	2026	Actress to Watch	4th	
Forbes Korea	2023	30 Under 30 – Asia	Included	
Forbes Korea	2025	Power Celebrity 40	30th	
Sisa Journal	2024	Next Generation Leaders 100	Included	
Star News (Note: Star News commissions Gallup Korea for the survey.)	2024	Best Television Couple of the Past Decade (Note: With Byeon Woo-seok for Lovely Runner (2024))	8th	
