= Lovely Runner =

2024 South Korean television series based on a web novel

- Promotional poster
- Hangul: 선재 업고 튀어
- Lit.: Runaway with Sun-jae on Piggyback
- RR: Seonjae eopgo twieo
- MR: Sŏnjae ŏpko t'wiŏ
- Genre: Time slip; Romantic comedy; Fantasy
- Based on: Tomorrow's Best by Kim Bbang
- Developed by: CJ ENM Studios (planning)
- Written by: Lee Si-eun
- Directed by: Yoon Jong-ho; Kim Tae-yeop
- Starring: Byeon Woo-seok; Kim Hye-yoon; Song Geon-hee; Lee Seung-hyub
- Music by: Kim Jung-ha; Choi In-young
- Opening theme: "You & I" (Inst.) by Eclipse
- Ending theme: Various themes (Note: The end themes used vary per episode but are all singles from Lovely Runner: Original Soundtrack.)
- Country of origin: South Korea
- Original language: Korean
- No. of episodes: 16

Production
- Executive producers: Kim Ho-joon CP; Kim Rak-hyun; Lee Joon-yong
- Producers: Moon Suk-hwan; Oh Gwang-hee; Park Soon-tae; Park Yoon-ah
- Cinematography: Yoon Dae-young; Jeon Hyun-suk; Shin Gi-chang; Park Min-hyun
- Editor: Kim Ok-sun
- Running time: 70 minutes
- Production company: Bon Factory

Original release
- Network: tvN
- Release: April 8 – May 28, 2024

Lovely Runner (Korean: 선재 업고 튀어) is a 2024 South Korean television series starring Byeon Woo-seok and Kim Hye-yoon. It is based on a web novel titled Tomorrow's Best, which was also serialized as a webtoon by illustrator Doong Doong. It aired on tvN every Monday and Tuesday at 20:50 (KST) from April 8 to May 28, 2024. It is also available for streaming on TVING in South Korea, U-Next in Japan, Vidio in Indonesia, and Viki and Viu in selected regions.

== Synopsis ==
In the world of stardom, Ryu Sun-jae shines as a top-tier celebrity whose life, despite its public facade, is marred by exhaustion. Im Sol, an ardent admirer of Sun-jae, finds solace in his music after an accident in her teenage years derailed her dreams.

When news breaks of Sun-jae's tragic death, Sol is devastated and is transported to fifteen years into the past, in 2008, when they were both 19-year-old high school students. Seeing this as a chance from heaven, Sol vows to change the course of destiny for both of them while challenging their past.

== Cast and characters ==
=== Main ===
- Byeon Woo-seok as Ryu Sun-jae

A top star who has everything, from good looks to talent and charm. He is a former swimmer turned singer of the band Eclipse and actor.

- Kim Hye-yoon as Im Sol

Letting go of her dreams of becoming a film director after an accident in 2008, she becomes an ardent fan of Sun-jae and Eclipse after finding solace in his words.

- Song Geon-hee as Kim Tae-seong

An ulzzang with a flamboyant look. He was the bassist of the band Eclipse in high school.

=== Supporting ===
People around Sol

- Jung Young-joo as Park Bok-soon

Sol's resilient single mother. She manages a struggling DVD store while raising her two children and caring for her elderly mother.

- Seong Byeong-suk as Jung Mal-ja

Sol's warm-hearted and wise grandmother.

- Song Ji-ho as Im Geum

Sol's older brother. He is an aspiring actor full of passion for acting, but he repeatedly faces rejection in auditions.

- Seo Hye-won as Lee Hyun-joo

Sol's best friend who is bold, sharp, and stubborn.

People around Sun-jae

- Lee Seung-hyub as Baek In-hyuk

A friendly guy who is easy to get along with. He is Sun-jae's best friend, as well as the leader and guitarist of the famous band Eclipse.

- Kim Won-hae as Ryu Geun-deok

Sun-jae's father and the owner of the Galbit House.

- Ahn Sang-woo as Representative Kim

CEO of Sun-jae's agency JNT.

- Lee Il-jun as Park Dong-suk

Sun-jae's manager.

People around Tae-seong

- Park Yoon-hee as Detective Kim

Tae-seong's father who is a veteran detective with 20 years of experience.

- Kim Hwi-gyu as Cha Yi-seul

Tae-seong's friend who has a weathered appearance that belies his pretty name.

JNT people

- Moon Yong-suk as Hyun-soo

The drummer of the band Eclipse.

- Yang Hyuk as Jay

A bassist and the youngest member of the band Eclipse.

Jagam High School students

- Lee Chul-woo as Kim Hyung-gu

A member of the Jagam High School swimming club, and Sun-jae's self-proclaimed rival.

- Kim Hyun-kyu as Choi Hyun-gu

Sun-jae's friend from Jagam High School swimming team.

- Jung Kang-hee as Coach Ahn

The coach of the Jagam High School swimming team.

- Oh Se-young as Choi Ga-hyun

Tae-seong's ex-girlfriend.

Others

- Heo Hyeong-Gyu as Kim Young-Soo

A taxi driver with a grudge against Sol and Sun-jae.

- Ko Tae-jin as Choi Jeong-hoon

An employee of the cinema where Im Sol applies for an interview.

=== Special appearances ===
- Park Tae-hwan as himself

A swimmer who plans to showcase his swimming skills alongside Sun-jae.

- Kwon Yu-ri as herself

A member of the girl group Girls' Generation.

- Han Seung-yeon as Radio DJ
- Lee Soo-ji as Heavenly Granny
- Kim Min-gi as Park Do-jun

== Episodes ==
No.	Title	Original release date	South Korea viewers (millions)
1	"Episode 1"	April 8, 2024	0.737
In July 2009, Im Sol is in the hospital after a car accident left her paralyzed. Emerging music group Eclipse randomly selects her as the winner in a radio contest, but she bitterly rebukes them. Lead singer Ryu Sun-jae, who attended the boys' high school close to Sol's, thanks her for being alive, inspiring her. By December 2022, Eclipse has become a global sensation and Sol is an avid fan. Among her fan memorabilia is a watch previously owned by Sun-jae. Sol leaves an Eclipse concert to attend a job interview for a film production company, but is rejected for her disability. She loses her ticket and spends the evening listening to the band from outside the venue. Later, her wheelchair 'runs out of power' on the Hangang Bridge, stranding her. Passing by, Sun-jae steps out of his car and shelters her with his umbrella before Sol's best friend Hyun-joo arrives to pick her up. A few hours later, Sol learns that Sun-jae has died from suicide. Devastated, she leaves for the hospital to see him, but drops her watch in a river and crawls in after it. When the watch reaches midnight on January 1, 2023, she is suddenly transported back to June 2008 and reunited with Sun-jae's younger self.
2	"Episode 2"	April 9, 2024	0.704
Stuck in the past, Sol becomes determined to prevent Sun-jae's suicide and her own accident. She discovers that time temporarily freezes if she attempts to reveal future events. She also reunites with her high school crush Kim Tae-seong, who recently rejected her younger self but becomes attracted to her more mature persona. Recalling that Sun-jae began singing after a June 2008 injury ended his swimming career, Sol attempts to dissuade him from competing, but to no avail. She also realizes that she and Sun-jae were neighbors in high school. Sun-jae practices swimming late at night and his rival Kim Hyung-gu plots to steal his swim trunks while he showers. Sol chases him off and Sun-jae catches her holding his swim trunks instead, but later learns she was defending him. While crossing the street, Sol is frozen by trauma from her accident and Sun-jae pulls her from a car's path. It's revealed that in 2007, Sun-jae met Sol in the rain after her package was wrongly delivered to his house and she gave him her umbrella, and he has loved her ever since. In 2023, a photograph of Sol and Sun-jae appears in his hotel room after his death.
3	"Episode 3"	April 15, 2024	0.892
Sun-jae wins his swim meet without incident while Sol watches. They celebrate and take the future picture in a photo booth, but Sun-jae is repeatedly prevented from confessing his feelings for Sol despite the encouragement of his friend and future bandmate Baek In-hyuk. While swimming the next day, Sun-jae tears his rotator cuff. His doctor informs him that he will never again be able to swim competitively. Sol recalls a house fire that originally burned her mother Bok-soon's hand and rushes home to prevent it. With Tae-seong's assistance, she prevents the fire from injuring anyone. Sun-jae undergoes surgery for his shoulder and Sol leaves him gifts in the hospital. As a thank-you, Sun-jae's father Geun-deok gives Sol a jar of fermented omija-cha, which she gets drunk from. While under the influence, she follows Sun-jae to the pool and unwittingly records their conversation as she promises to stay by his side. Sun-jae confessed his feelings for her and they share a kiss, but the next day Sol has forgotten the encounter. Tae-seong asks Sol out on a date when her watch suddenly flashes and she transported back to 2023. In 2008, Sol's younger self eagerly accepts Tae-seong while Sun-jae watches.
4	"Episode 4"	April 16, 2024	0.859
In December 2022, Sun-jae is saddened when Sol doesn't remember him. In January 2023, Sol laments her failure to change the future. In-hyuk meets with her, having recognized her from the photo Sun-jae kept. The next day, the watch flashes again at midnight and Sol is returned to 2008, ten days after accepting Tae-seong. To her embarrassment, she remembers that her younger self requested an exorcism for herself and also coldly rebuffed Sun-jae after she started dating Tae-seong. Sol defends Sun-jae from his former teammates and is later harassed by Ga-hyun, Tae-seong's jealous ex-girlfriend. Their fight is broken up by Mr. Kim, Sun-jae's future manager. Mr. Kim gives his business card to Sun-jae. Sol later sneaks into his home to destroy it and deliver self-help books in an effort to prevent Sun-jae's eventual death. Sun-jae discovers her asleep in his room and helps her sneak out after realizing she doesn't remember his confession. Sol tells Tae-seong that she possesses a naive persona and a mature one and only the former is attracted to him. After missing a bus stop, Sol is harassed by a drunk man and falls into a reservoir, but Sun-jae saves her.
5	"Episode 5"	April 22, 2024	0.947
Sun-jae's friends and family try to prevent him from watching the 2008 Summer Olympics, but he says he's accepted his limits. Sol buries a time capsule with Sun-jae and makes him promise to reunite on Hangang Bridge at midnight on January 1, 2023 to open the capsule. They begin studying for their college entrance exams, with Sun-jae now planning on going into physical education. Blaming him for getting her drunk, Sol's brother Geum confronts Sun-jae and Bok-soon breaks up their scuffle. Sun-jae also repeatedly clashes with Tae-seong. Sol decides to learn to ride a bike and Sun-jae helps her. The fledgling Eclipse, which includes In-hyuk and Tae-seong, has Sun-jae sub in for the lead singer at a performance while Mr. Kim observes. Sol discourages Sun-jae from contacting him, and he responds that he participated in the show only to win a new cell phone for her. Sol tells Sun-jae to only worry about himself. Later, she hears the recording of Sun-jae confessing his feelings for her. At the same time, Sun-jae asks her to break up with Tae-seong.
6	"Episode 6"	April 23, 2024	0.871
In 2013, Sol listens to an interview where Sun-jae describes meeting his first love in the rain, unaware that he is talking about her. In August 2008, Sol furiously breaks up with Tae-seong after hearing that he is only dating her to spite Ga-hyun. Sun-jae finds Sol outside her house with a bottle of her grandmother's makgeolli and attempts to confiscate it. Geum intervenes and in the chaos, Sun-jae accidentally consumes some alcohol and passes out. The family takes him inside and Sol watches over him as he sleeps. Tae-seong mopes over losing Sol and ends up in a minor motorcycle accident. Bok-soon goes on a trip with her new boyfriend. Sol and Sun-jae see a baseball game together and afterwards Sun-jae again confesses his feelings. They're interrupted when Tae-seong calls to report that Bok-soon is in the same hospital as him after a sudden illness. Following Bok-soon's surgery, Sol tells Sun-jae she cannot accept his feelings. On September 1, Sol avoids leaving the house in a effort to avoid her destined accident. Sun-jae sends her an email asking to meet up and she reluctantly leaves to see him. When she doesn't arrive, Sun-jae returns home, but sees Sol's umbrella lying in the road and realizes she has been kidnapped.
7	"Episode 7"	April 29, 2024	1.090
It's revealed that in the original timeline, Sol was kidnapped after missing a bus stop. When she tried to run, her captor hit her with a car and knocked her into a reservoir, but Sun-jae, who was riding the same bus, saved her life. Presently, Sol steals her kidnapper's car keys and flees. Sun-jae appears and the kidnapper drives past them in a van. Sol is transported back to January 1, 2023. In the new timeline, she is a successful film director and is able to walk. Sun-jae is still alive, but he and Sol failed to meet at midnight of the new year. As a consequence of Sol's interference, Hyun-joo and Geum are now married with two children. Though satisfied with the new timeline, Sol still misses Sun-jae. Sol is hit with a restraining order after being mistaken for a similarly-dressed girl who is stalking Eclipse. She learns that the concert preceding Sun-jae's suicide was delayed to January, meaning he is still in danger. She is unable to get into the concert, but leaves her business card for Sun-jae, which he later sees and recognizes. Following the concert, Sol waits for him on the Hangang Bridge, where she and Sun-jae are again reunited.
8	"Episode 8"	April 30, 2024	1.248
In June 2022, Sun-jae dug up the time capsule. Six months later, he was disappointed when Sol failed to make their rendezvous. He found the capsule contained a wind-up watch and an encouraging note from Sol. In the present, Sol and Sun-jae go to a bar and later his apartment together. Sol admits that she wants to stay with him because she fears he'll die soon. Sun-jae hides Sol in his closet when In-hyuk drops by and chides him for still loving Sol and crying for her whenever he's drunk. Sol hears everything and also finds the time capsule. It's revealed that Sol's younger self cut ties with Sun-jae after the kidnapping. Presently, Sun-jae takes her home. Sol confesses that she had feelings for Sun-jae in high school and they kiss. Sol's newfound glee is interrupted when Hyun-joo moves to divorce Geum when he loses their money in a failed investment. Sol tracks Sun-jae's stalker down, learning that she is a 14-year-old runaway. While getting dressed to meet with Sol, Sun-jae's doorbell rings. Sol learns from a news report that Sun-jae has been hospitalized after being attacked by Sol's kidnapper, who was recently released from prison.
9	"Episode 9"	May 6, 2024	1.384
As Sun-jae enters emergency surgery, Sol learns that her kidnapper, Kim Young-soo, was imprisoned for kidnapping her in May 2009. Sun-jae helped in his capture, and after his release Young-soo sought his revenge. Sol's demented grandmother Mal-ja, who is implied to be aware of the time travel, gives her the watch. Using it, Sol takes herself back to March 2009, by which time she, Hyun-joo, and Sun-jae are university students (Sun-jae having skipped college in the original timeline). Sol reports her September 2008 kidnapping to the police and provides Young-soo's identifying details, including his involvement in an unsolved murder.
10	"Episode 10"	May 7, 2024	1.275
11	"Episode 11"	May 13, 2024	1.322
12	"Episode 12"	May 14, 2024	1.189
13	"Episode 13"	May 20, 2024	1.315
Sol is unable to prevent Sun-jae from being stabbed to death by Young-soo. In 2023, Sol continues living her life without Sun-jae. Actor Park Do-jun causes problems on set in a rom-com Bon Cinema is producing, resulting in Sol having an altercation while trying to stop him from driving drunk. Sol's boss blames her for the incident. Drunk and angry, Sol writes a rambling resignation letter to deliver. The next day, Sol's boss apologizes to her and offers to produce her original screenplay. However, she also takes the resignation letter with her to a film festival, and Sol follows her to intercept it. After retrieving the envelope, Sol runs into Sun-jae, now a famous actor. It's revealed that following his death in May 2009, Sol used the watch to prevent their first meeting, resulting in a new timeline where Sun-jae has no memory of her.
14	"Episode 14"	May 21, 2024	1.289
Sol accidentally takes Sun-jae's envelope, containing the winner of the film festival. As a result, Sun-jae accidentally reads the opening of Sol's resignation letter on live television. Having removed Park Do-jun from the film, Bon Cinema extends Sun-jae an offer to star in the movie. Hyun-joo accidentally sends him Sol's screenplay instead, revealed to be a dramatization of Sol and Sun-jae's romance through time. Despite having no memory of the events, Sun-jae is moved to tears and agrees to star in the film.
15	"Episode 15"	May 27, 2024	1.431
16	"Episode 16"	May 28, 2024	1.661

== Production ==
=== Development ===
The series was originally published as a web novel on KakaoPage between July and September 2020, written by Kim Bbang. It was later adapted into a webtoon by illustrator Doong Doong, which became available in September 2021.

It is directed by Yoon Jong-ho, who co-directed other popular works such as Guardian: The Lonely and Great God (2016–2017), My Holo Love (2020), and Flower of Evil (2020). It is also written by Lee Si-eun, who is best known for her work True Beauty (2020–2021).

It was previously titled Time Walking on Memory (기억을 걷는 시간; Gieogeul geonneun sigan).

Writer Lee Si-eun stated that the character Im Sol was specifically created with actress Kim Hye-yoon in mind. It was also revealed that the series took three years to produce and was offered to several other actors before the role ultimately went to Byeon Woo-seok.

=== Casting ===
On March 28, 2023, reports surfaced stating that Kim Hye-yoon and Byeon Woo-seok were in discussions and actively considering taking the lead roles. Their appearance was subsequently confirmed on July 19 by the production team of tvN. On July 27, Song Geon-hee was also confirmed to co-star alongside Kim and Byeon. On the same day, there were reports highlighting that Lee Seung-hyub was in discussions to appear in the drama, and his agency confirmed his participation on July 31. In the following days, it was reported that Yang Hyuk would be also joining the cast.

=== Filming ===
Filming began in the second half of 2023.

== Original soundtrack ==
Lovely Runner: Original Soundtrack

Soundtrack album by Various artists
- Released: May 28, 2024
- Genre: Soundtrack
- Length: 201:33
- Languages: Korean; English
- Label: Stone Music

=== Album ===
The drama's soundtrack is compiled in a three-part album released by label Stone Music Entertainment on May 28, 2024. CD 1 contains Eclipse's song, CD 2 contains the drama's theme songs, and CD 3 contains the drama's musical score.

Lovely Runner: Original Soundtrack

CD 1
No.	Title	Lyrics	Music	Artist	Length
1.	"Sudden Shower" (소나기)	Han Sung-ho	Han Sung-ho; Park Soo-suk	Eclipse	3:53
2.	"Run Run"	Jeong Jin-wook	Yipro	Eclipse	3:34
3.	"You & I"	Kim Min; Taylor	Kim; Taylor	Eclipse	2:49
4.	"No Fate" (만날테니까)	San Yoon	Vendurs	Eclipse	2:47
5.	"I'll Be There"	G. Gorilla	G. Gorilla	Eclipse	3:52
Total length:					16:55

CD 2
No.	Title	Lyrics	Music	Artist	Length
1.	"Star"	Jeong Koo-hyun; Aseul	Jeong	N.Flying	3:38
2.	"Like a Dream" (꿈결같아서)	Jeong Koo-hyun; Aseul	Jeong	Minnie ((G)I-dle)	4:09
3.	"May I Love You?" (이 마음을 전해도 될까)	Park Woo-sang (Logos); Song Yoo-jin	Park; Si-woo; Song	Umji (Viviz)	3:18
4.	"Super Ultra Man" (슈퍼울트라맨)	Deundeun Man	Deundeun Man	Deundeun Man	3:18
5.	"A Day"	Han Jae-hwan; Park Jeong-jun	Han	Jongho (Ateez)	3:52
6.	"I Think I Did" (그랬나봐)	You Hee-yeol	You	Yoo Hwe-seung (N.Flying)	4:20
7.	"Monologue" (독백)	Baek Seung-jae; Jason Moon; Sean Kimm	Baek; Moon	Jae Yeon	3:11
8.	"Spring Snow" (봄눈)	Choi In-young	Choi	10cm	3:21
9.	"Gift" (선물)	Choi In-young	Yoon Young-jun	Ha Sung-woon	4:49
10.	"Please Don't Leave Anywhere" (떠나지마)	Doko	Doko; Sa Seung-ho	Doko	3:21
Total length:					16:28

CD 3
No.	Title	Artist	Length
1.	"My Only One Star"	Kim Tae-young	2:13
2.	"Lonely Planet"	muii	3:30
3.	"Swing of Hips"	Moon Jung-woon	1:15
4.	"Plain Mat"	Dennis Chang	0:55
5.	"Heavy Thoughts"	Kim Yoo-hyun	2:30
6.	"Warmth"	Mond	1:25
7.	"Our Dream"	Han Jae-wan	1:33
8.	"Holland"	muii	1:54
9.	"Me, Myself"	Dennis Chang	1:34
10.	"Let's Fight"	Moon Jung-wook	1:04
11.	"Long Day"	Kim Yeo-yeon	2:23
12.	"Clockwise"	Mond	1:04
13.	"Black Tail"	muii	1:28
14.	"Small Candy"	Han Jae-wan	0:45
15.	"Ark"	Dennis Chang	1:32
16.	"Time Machine"	Kim Tae-young	2:37
17.	"The News"	Moon Jung-wook	1:36
18.	"Breeze"	Kim Yoo-hyeo	1:48
19.	"Walking Cat"	Mond	0:57
20.	"Youth"	muii	1:05
21.	"My Cat"	Han Jae-wan	1:03
22.	"Art Tech"	Dennis Chang	1:51
23.	"Dream Loop"	Moon Jung-wook	1:26
24.	"Sweet Time"	Kim Yeo-yeon	2:13
25.	"Harmony"	Kim Tae-young	1:11
26.	"Fresh Day"	Moon Jung-wook	0:50
27.	"Jump"	Kim Yeo-yeon	1:40
28.	"Sol Life"	muii	2:01
29.	"Not Over You"	Dennis Chang	1:36
30.	"Holly Molly"	Moon Jung-wook	1:34
31.	"Last Loop"	Kim Yeo-yeon	2:23
32.	"Zany Clown"	Mond	0:38
33.	"Pulse"	Moon Jung-wook	1:43
34.	"Underwater"	muii	2:17
35.	"The More I Do"	Dennis Chang	0:52
36.	"Secretly, Stealthily, Quietly"	Moon Jung-wook	1:43
37.	"It's Alright"	Kim Yuh-yun	1:26
38.	"Looming Shadow"	Moon Jung-wook	1:13
Total length:			59:38

=== Singles ===
The following is the track list of singles from Lovely Runner: Original Soundtrack.

Singles from Lovely Runner (Parts 1–10)

Part 1

Released on April 8, 2024
No.	Title	Lyrics	Music	Artist	Length
1.	"Sudden Shower" (소나기)	Han Sung-ho	Han Sung-ho; Park Soo-suk	Eclipse (Note: The song is performed by Byeon Woo-seok as vocalist, Lee Seung-hyub as guitarist, Yang Hyuk as bassist, and Moon Yong-suk as drummer.)	3:53
2.	"Run Run"	Jeong Jin-wook	Yipro	Eclipse	3:34
3.	"You & I"	Kim Min; Taylor	Kim Min; Taylor	Eclipse	2:49
4.	"No Fate" (만날테니까)	San Yoon	Vendurs	Eclipse	2:47
5.	"Sudden Shower" (소나기;Inst.)		Han Sung-ho; Park Soo-suk		3:53
6.	"Run Run" (Inst.)		Yipro		3:34
7.	"You & I" (Inst.)		Kim Min; Taylor		2:49
8.	"No Fate" (만날테니까; Inst.)		Vendurs		2:47
Total length:					26:10

Part 2

Released on April 9, 2024
No.	Title	Lyrics	Music	Artist	Length
1.	"Star"	Jeong Koo-hyun; Aseul	Jeong Koo-hyun	N.Flying	3:38
2.	"Star" (Inst.)		Jeong Koo-hyun		3:38
Total length:					7:16

Part 3

Released on April 16, 2024
No.	Title	Lyrics	Music	Artist	Length
1.	"Like a Dream" (꿈결같아서)	Jeong Koo-hyun; Aseul	Jeong Koo-hyun	Minnie ((G)I-dle)	4:09
2.	"Like a Dream" (꿈결같아서; Inst.)		Jeong Koo-hyun		4:09
Total length:					8:18

Part 4

Released on April 23, 2024
No.	Title	Lyrics	Music	{{{extra_column}}}	Length
1.	"May I Love You?" (이 마음을 전해도 될까)	Park Woo-sang (LOGOS); Song Yoo-jin	Park Woo-sang (LOGOS); SIU; Song Yoo-jin	Umji (Viviz)	3:18
2.	"Super Ultra Man" (슈퍼울트라맨)	Deundeun Man	Deundeun Man	Deundeun Man	3:18
3.	"I'll Be There"	G.Gorilla	G.Gorilla	Eclipse	3:52
4.	"May I Love You?" (이 마음을 전해도 될까; Inst.)		Park Woo-sang (LOGOS); SIU; Song Yoo-jin		3:18
5.	"Super Ultra Man" (슈퍼울트라맨; Inst.)		Deundeun Man		3:17
6.	"I'll Be There" (Inst.)		G.Gorilla		3:52
Total length:					20:55

Part 5

Released on April 30, 2024
No.	Title	Lyrics	Music	Artist	Length
1.	"A Day"	Han Jae-hwan; Park Jeong-jun	Han Jae-hwan	Jongho (Ateez)	3:52
2.	"A Day" (Inst.)		Han Jae-hwan		3:52
Total length:					7:45

Part 6

Released on May 6, 2024
No.	Title	Lyrics	Music	Artist	Length
1.	"I Think I Did" (그랬나봐)	You Hee-yeol	You Hee-yeol	Yoo Hwe-seung (N.Flying) (Note: Original song by Kim Hyung-joong, released in 2003.)	4:20
2.	"I Think I Did" (그랬나봐; Inst.)		You Hee-yeol		4:20
Total length:					8:41

Part 7

Released on May 7, 2024
No.	Title	Lyrics	Music	Artist	Length
1.	"Monologue" (독백)	Baek Seung-jae; Jason Moon; Sean Kimm	Baek Seung-jae; Jason Moon	Jae Yeon	3:11
2.	"Monologue" (독백; Inst.)		Baek Seung-jae; Jason Moon		3:10
Total length:					6:22

Part 8

Released on May 14, 2024
No.	Title	Lyrics	Music	Artist	Length
1.	"Spring Snow" (봄눈)	Choi In-young	Choi In-young	10cm	3:21
2.	"Spring Snow" (봄눈; Inst.)		Choi In-young		3:21
Total length:					6:43

Part 9

Released on May 21, 2024
No.	Title	Lyrics	Music	Artist	Length
1.	"Gift" (선물)	Choi In-young	Yoon Young-jun	Ha Sung-woon	4:49
2.	"Gift" (선물; Inst.)		Yoon Young-jun		4:49
Total length:					9:39

Part 10

Released on May 27, 2024
No.	Title	Lyrics	Music	Artist	Length
1.	"Please Don't Leave Anywhere" (떠나지마)	Doko	Doko; Sa Seung-ho	Doko	3:21
2.	"Please Don't Leave Anywhere" (떠나지마; Inst.)		Doko; Sa Seung-ho		3:21
Total length:					6:43

=== Chart performance ===
==== Album ====
Chart performance for Lovely Runner OST
Chart (2024)	Peak position
South Korean Albums (Circle)	6

==== Singles ====
List of singles, showing year released, with selected chart positions and notes
Title	Year	Peak chart positions			Notes
Title	Year	KOR	KOR Songs	WW	Notes
"Sudden Shower" (Eclipse)	2024	4	8	167	Part 1
"Run Run" (Eclipse)	2024	38	—	—	Part 1
"You & I" (Eclipse)	2024	99	—	—	Part 1
"No Fate" (Eclipse)	2024	115	—	—	Part 1
"Star" (N.Flying)	2024	85	—	—	Part 2
"Like a Dream" (Minnie)	2024	65	—	—	Part 3
"May I Love You?" (Umji)	2024	— (Note: "May I Love You?" did not enter the Circle Digital Chart, but it peaked at number 80 on the Circle Download Chart.)	—	—	Part 4
"Super Ultra Man" (Deundeun Man)	2024	— (Note: "Super Ultra Man" did not enter the Circle Digital Chart, but it peaked at number 128 on the Circle Download Chart.)	—	—	Part 4
"I'll Be There" (Eclipse)	2024	111	—	—	Part 4
"A Day" (Jongho)	2024	133	—	—	Part 5
"I Think I Did" (Yoo Hwe-seung)	2024	35	—	—	Part 6
"Monologue" (Jae Yeon)	2024	— (Note: "Monologue" did not enter the Circle Digital Chart, but it peaked at number 58 on the Circle Download Chart.)	—	—	Part 7
"Spring Snow" (10cm)	2024	31	—	—	Part 8
"Gift" (Ha Sung-woon)	2024	135	—	—	Part 9
"Please Don't Leave Anywhere" (Doko)	2024	— (Note: "Please Don't Leave Anywhere" did not enter the Circle Digital Chart, but it peaked at number 52 on the Circle Download Chart.)	—	—	Part 10
"—" denotes a recording that did not chart or was not released in that region.

== Release ==
The series was originally scheduled to be broadcast in the second half of 2023, but was moved to the first half of 2024 due to the changes in tvN's Monday and Tuesday lineup.

During the CJ ENM Meet & Grow conference on January 18, 2024, tvN officially confirmed that Lovely Runner was scheduled for April 2024. The series premiered on April 8, 2024. It was also available for streaming on TVING in South Korea, U-Next in Japan, Vidio in Indonesia, and Viki and Viu in selected regions. On July 15, 2024, it was announced that the series would also be available for streaming on Netflix in selected regions, starting from August 1, 2024.

== Reception ==
=== Critical response ===
Despite its modest viewership ratings, Lovely Runner garnered positive reviews from audiences, contributing significantly to Byeon Woo-seok's rise to stardom and solidifying Kim Hye-yoon's reputation in the industry. Film critic Jung Duk-hyun, one of the prominent judges at the prestigious Baeksang Arts Awards, praised Kim for her exceptional acting prowess in her role as Im Sol.

Singapore's national newspaper The Straits Times gave the series four out of five stars, stating that the love story between the characters portrayed by Byeon and Kim was captivating and the "multi-layered" plot got richer and richer with each episode. Time Magazine praised the drama as one of the best K-dramas released in 2024, commending the series for its use of "familiar genres to craft a thrillingly unexpected, continuously moving story experience".

=== Viewership ===
Lovely Runner : South Korea viewers per episode (millions)

Season	Episode number																Average
Season	1	2	3	4	5	6	7	8	9	10	11	12	13	14	15	16	Average
1	0.737	0.704	0.892	0.859	0.947	0.871	1.090	1.124	1.384	1.275	1.322	1.189	1.315	1.289	1.431	1.661	1.131

Source: Audience measurement performed nationwide by Nielsen Korea.

Average TV viewership ratings
Ep.	Original broadcast date	Average audience share (Nielsen Korea)	
Ep.	Original broadcast date	Nationwide	Seoul
1	April 8, 2024	3.073% (2nd)	3.176% (2nd)
2	April 9, 2024	2.710% (3rd)	2.918% (3rd)
3	April 15, 2024	3.444% (1st)	3.678% (1st)
4	April 16, 2024	3.378% (1st)	4.069% (1st)
5	April 22, 2024	3.435% (2nd)	3.834% (2nd)
6	April 23, 2024	3.377% (1st)	3.946% (1st)
7	April 29, 2024	4.459% (1st)	5.259% (1st)
8	April 30, 2024	4.095% (1st)	4.656% (1st)
9	May 6, 2024	4.759% (1st)	5.638% (1st)
10	May 7, 2024	4.752% (1st)	5.973% (1st)
11	May 13, 2024	4.735% (1st)	5.670% (1st)
12	May 14, 2024	4.260% (1st)	5.002% (1st)
13	May 20, 2024	4.568% (1st)	5.214% (1st)
14	May 21, 2024	4.827% (1st)	5.349% (1st)
15	May 27, 2024	5.297% (1st)	6.197% (1st)
16	May 28, 2024	5.762% (1st)	7.208% (1st)
Average		4.183%	4.862%
In the table above, the blue numbers represent the lowest ratings and the red numbers represent the highest ratings.; This drama aired on a cable channel/pay TV which normally has a relatively smaller audience compared to free-to-air TV/public broadcasters (KBS, SBS, MBC, and EBS).

== Accolades ==
=== Awards and nominations ===
Name of the award ceremony, year presented, category, nominee of the award, and the result of the nomination
Award ceremony	Year	Category	Nominee / Work	Result	Ref.
APAN Star Awards	2024	Best Couple	Byeon Woo-seok and Kim Hye-yoon	Won	
APAN Star Awards	2024	Best OST	Eclipse – "Sudden Shower"	Won	
APAN Star Awards	2024	Best OST	N.Flying – "Star"	Nominated	
APAN Star Awards	2024	Best New Actor	Lee Seung-hyub	Nominated	
APAN Star Awards	2024	Best Director	Yoon Jong-ho	Nominated	
APAN Star Awards	2024	Best Writer	Lee Si-eun	Nominated	
APAN Star Awards	2024	Excellence Actress in a Serial Drama	Jung Young-ju	Won	
APAN Star Awards	2024	Global Star	Byeon Woo-seok	Won	
APAN Star Awards	2024	Popularity Award, Actor	Byeon Woo-seok	Won	
APAN Star Awards	2024	Popularity Award, Actress	Kim Hye-yoon	Won	
APAN Star Awards	2024	Top Excellence Actor in a Miniseries	Byeon Woo-seok	Nominated	
APAN Star Awards	2024	Top Excellence Actress in a Miniseries	Kim Hye-yoon	Nominated	
Asia Contents Awards & Global OTT Awards	2024	Best Lead Actress	Kim Hye-yoon	Nominated	
Asia Contents Awards & Global OTT Awards	2024	Best Newcomer Actor	Byeon Woo-seok	Nominated	
Asia Contents Awards & Global OTT Awards	2024	Best Original Song	Eclipse – Sudden Shower	Nominated	
Asia Contents Awards & Global OTT Awards	2024	People's Choice Award	Kim Hye-yoon	Won	
Asia Contents Awards & Global OTT Awards	2024	People's Choice Award	Byeon Woo-seok	Won	
Asian Academy Creative Awards	2024	Best Cinematography (Grand Final)	Yoon Dae-young	Nominated	
Asian Academy Creative Awards	2024	Best Cinematography (Korea)	Yoon Dae-young	Won	
Asian Television Awards	2024	Best Theme Song (Grand Final)	Byeon Woo-seok	Nominated	
Asian Television Awards	2024	Best Theme Song (Korea)	Byeon Woo-seok	Won	
Baeksang Arts Awards	2025	Best Drama	Lovely Runner	Nominated	
Baeksang Arts Awards	2025	Best Actor – Television	Byeon Woo-seok	Nominated	
Baeksang Arts Awards	2025	Best Actress – Television	Kim Hye-yoon	Nominated	
Baeksang Arts Awards	2025	Best New Actor – Television	Song Geon-hee	Nominated	
Baeksang Arts Awards	2025	Best Screenplay – Television	Lee Si-eun	Nominated	
Brand of the Year Awards	2024	Actor – Hot Trend	Byeon Woo-seok	Won	
Brand of the Year Awards	2024	Actress – Hot Trend	Kim Hye-yoon	Won	
Brand of the Year Awards	2024	Actor – Rising Star	Song Geon-hee	Won	
Brand of the Year Awards	2024	Actor – Idol	Lee Seung-hyub	Won	
Brand of the Year Awards	2024	Actress – Scene Stealer	Jung Young-ju	Won	
KAA Awards - Korea Advertisers Association	2024	Program of the Year	Lovely Runner	Won	
Korea Grand Music Awards	2024	Best OST	Yoo Hwe-seung (N.Flying) – I Think I Did	Won	
MAMA Awards	2024	Favorite Global Trending Music	Byeon Woo-seok	Won	
MAMA Awards	2024	Best OST	Eclipse – Sudden Shower	Nominated	
Melon Music Awards	2024	Best OST	Eclipse – Sudden Shower	Won	
Melon Music Awards	2024	Best OST	10cm – Spring Snow	Nominated	
Seoul International Drama Awards	2024	Outstanding Asian Star: Korea Popularity Award (Male)	Byeon Woo-seok	Won	
Seoul International Drama Awards	2024	Outstanding Asian Star: Korea Popularity Award (Female)	Kim Hye-yoon	Won	

=== Honors ===
Name of country or organization, year given, name of honor/award, and nominee of the award
Country or organization	Year	Honor/Award	Nominee	Ref.
Newsis K-Expo Cultural Awards (Note: Established in 2019 and co-sponsored by Korea's Ministry of Culture, Sports and Tourism, Ministry of Foreign Affairs, Korea Creative Content Agency, Seoul Metropolitan Council and the Seoul Tourism Organization, it awards cultural icons, businesses, and individuals who have contributed greatly to Hallyu, the Korean wave.)	2024	National Assembly Culture, Sports and Tourism Committee Award	Kim Hye-yoon	
Korean Popular Culture and Arts Awards	2024	Minister of Culture, Sports and Tourism Commendation	Yoon Jong-ho	

==== Listicles ====
Name of publisher, year listed, name of listicle, and placement
Publisher	Year	Listicle	Placement	Ref.
Cine21	2024	Top 10 Series of 2024	10th place (Note: Tied with The Atypical Family.)	
NME	2024	The 10 best K-dramas of 2024 – so far	Included	
NME	2024	The 10 best Korean dramas of 2024	2nd place	
South China Morning Post	2024	The 15 best K-dramas of 2024	9th place	
Teen Vogue	2024	13 Best K-Dramas of 2024	Included	
Time	2024	The 10 Best K-Dramas of 2024	1st place	
