= Byeon Woo-seok =

South Korean model and actor (born 1991)

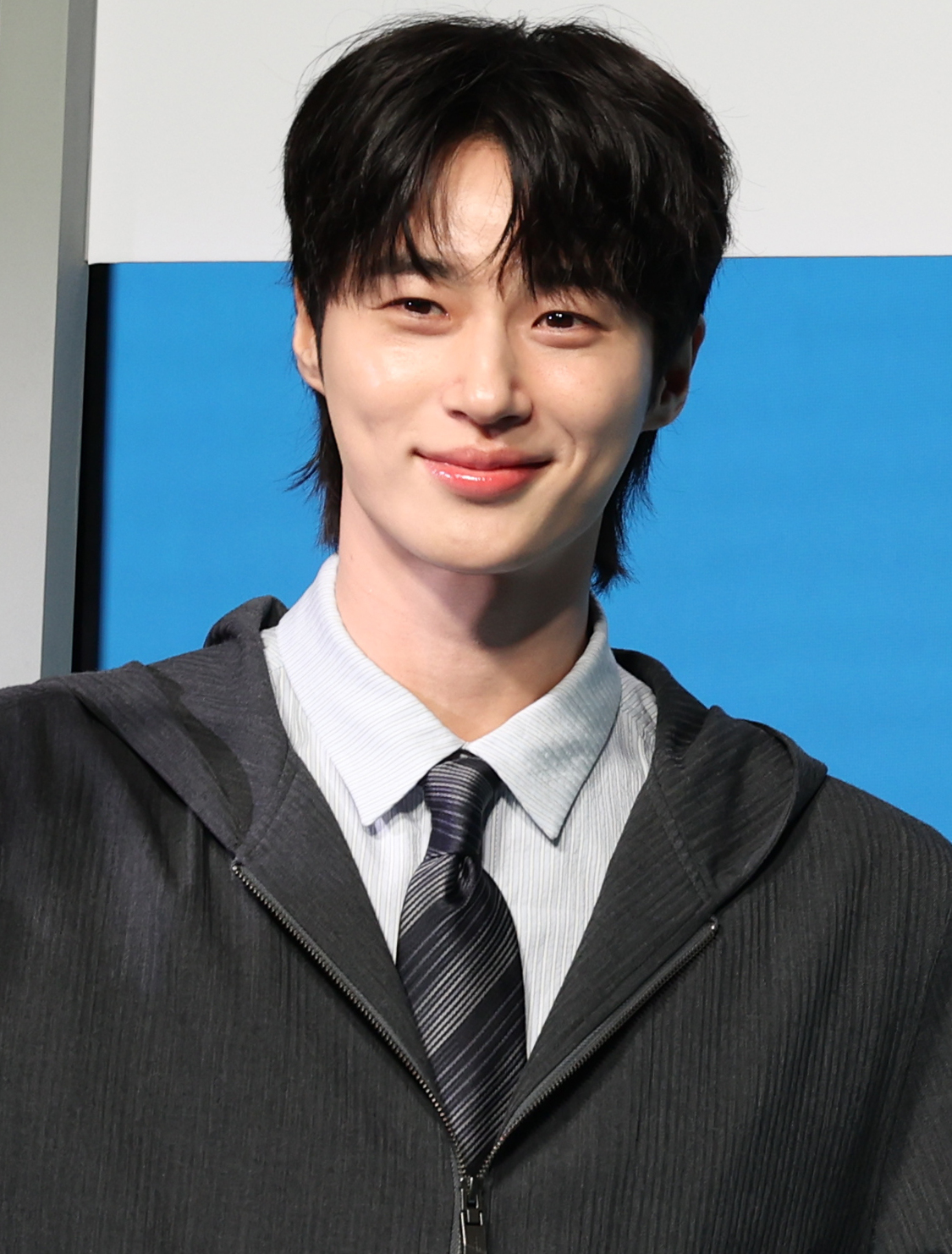
- Byeon in 2026
- Born: October 31, 1991 (age 35); Bucheon, South Korea
- Occupations: Model; actor
- Years active: 2010–present
- Agent: Varo Entertainment

Korean name
- Hangul: 변우석
- Hanja: 邊佑錫
- RR: Byeon Useok
- MR: Pyŏn Usŏk

Byeon Woo-seok (Korean: 변우석; born October 31, 1991) is a South Korean model and actor. He debuted as a model in 2010 and walked the 2015 F/W Men's Fashion Show runway. He transitioned into acting with supporting roles in dramas Record of Youth (2020) and Strong Girl Nam-soon (2023). Byeon gained wide recognition for his starring role in television series Lovely Runner (2024), and made his film debut with the Netflix film 20th Century Girl (2022).

== Early life and education ==
Byeon was born on October 31, 1991, in Bucheon, South Korea. He has an older sister who is a flight attendant. He spent his early childhood there until kindergarten, after which his family relocated to Seoul. He graduated from Wooshin High School. Byeon enrolled in the Department of Theater and Film at Cheongju University intending to become an actor. While seeking agency representation, he was signed as a model instead and completed only the first semester before discontinuing his studies.

== Career ==
=== 2010–2015: Beginnings as a model ===
Prior to acting, Byeon pursued a modeling career, debuted as a model in 2010. He actively worked in various fields such as Seoul Fashion Week, various fashion shows, advertising campaigns and magazines, and model trainer. He walked the runway for domestic designers at the Seoul Fashion Week S/S and F/W seasons from 2014 to 2017. His modeling career included work for numerous fashion magazines and advertising campaigns, with notable appearances in publications like Arena, Cosmopolitan, W, and Elle. Byeon made his international debut through the 2015 F/W Men's Fashion Show on seven runways.

=== 2016–2023: Venture into acting ===
Byeon began his acting career with minor roles in television dramas, including tvN's Dear My Friends, as Son Jong-shik, SBS' Moon Lovers: Scarlet Heart Ryeo as Ha-jin's former boyfriend, and MBC's Weightlifting Fairy Kim Bok-joo as a swimmer. In 2017, Byeon was cast as the main lead of tvN's Drama Stage History of Walking Upright as Jong-min, the male friend of the female protagonist. In 2019, he joined as one of the lead cast in JTBC's television series Flower Crew: Joseon Marriage Agency. In 2020, Byeon was cast in a lead role in tvN's television series Record of Youth opposite Park Bo-gum and Park So-dam.

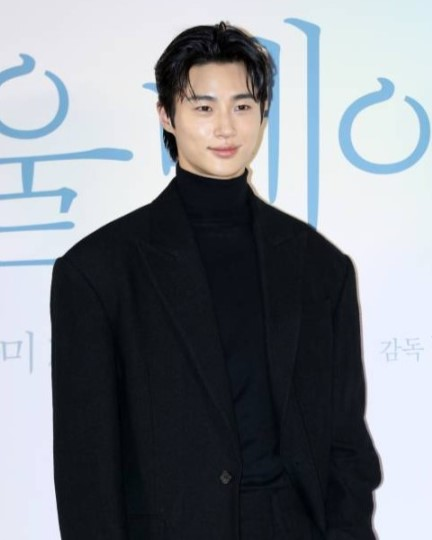
Byeon at Soulmate's press conference in February 2023

In 2021, Byeon was cast in KBS2's historical television series Moonshine, in which he was awarded Best New Actor at the 2022 KBS Drama Awards. In the same year, Byeon had his film debut in the Netflix film 20th Century Girl. The film premiered in 2022. He received nominations for Best New Actor at Baeksang Arts Awards and Buil Film Awards for his role. In 2022, Byeon received another leading role in film Soulmate. The film was released in theaters in 2023. He received a Best New Actor nomination at Grand Bell Awards for his role. Also in 2022, Byeon was cast as Ryu Si-o in Strong Girl Nam-soon.

=== 2024–present: Breakthrough and rising popularity ===
On July 19, 2023, he was cast in his first leading role as Ryu Sun-jae in tvN's time slip romance television series Lovely Runner, opposite Kim Hye-yoon. The series premiered in April 2024.

For his role, Byeon took singing lessons to prepare. His performance earned him a nomination for Best Actor at the Baeksang Arts Awards and multiple accolades, most notably the Daesang (Best Actor of the Year) at the Asia Artist Awards 2024.

The OST "Sudden Shower" (performed by Byeon as Eclipse) entered the Billboard Global 200 and won Best OST at the Melon Music Awards.

In September 2024, Byeon made a special appearance as a convenience store worker in No Gain No Love. On December 2, 2024, Kakao Entertainment announced Byeon will star in MBC's television series Perfect Crown opposite IU, portraying the lead role of Lee Ahn. In July 2025, Netflix announced that Byeon will portray Sung Jin-woo in the live-action adaptation of the webtoon Solo Leveling.

== Other ventures ==
=== Endorsements ===
In 2015, Byeon's modeling career saw him selected as a model for the Swedish fashion brand Elvine.

Following his breakthrough roles, particularly in Lovely Runner in 2024, Byeon became a sought-after endorser. In 2024 alone, he was named brand ambassador for Discovery Expedition Korea and global brand ambassador of LG Household & Health Care's dermatological beauty brand Physiogel. In the same month, LG Electronics has selected him as the new model for LG Stand By Me. In July, he was selected to promote for Nonghyup Bank and an ambassador for the beauty brand Clinique as well as men's cosmetic brand, Dashu. In August, he was selected to endorsed for Paldo Bibim Men, Baskin-Robbins Korea, and selected as brand ambassador of LG Household & Health Care brand Euthymol. In September, he was selected as model for Job Korea and Albamon. Towards the end of the year, he was selected as model for iloom, Ediya Coffee, contact lens brand Olens, and Kyochon. His significant luxury brand partnerships in 2024 included becoming brand ambassador for Giordano, Prada, and Cartier.

In December 2025, Byeon appeared alongside Karina and Jang Won-young for Google Gemini's advertising campaign titled "The Christmas Song".

In 2026, Byeon was appointed as the global ambassador of South Korean skincare brand Dr.G. In the same year, he was also appointed as the brand ambassador for champagne brand Le Reve Brillant in Japan.

=== Philanthropy ===
In October 2024, Byeon donated ₩300 million ($217,000) to Severance Hospital to help fund treatments for pediatric patients. The actor kept his donation private, but was later revealed in a report by local news outlet. In March 2025, Byeon donated ₩100 million to The Hope Bridge Korea Disaster Relief Association (Note: The Hope Bridge Korea Disaster Relief Association, established in 1961 by a coalition of media and social organizations, began in 1959 as the 'Korea Flood Damage Response Committee' to aid victims of Typhoon Sarah. Renamed the 'Korea Disaster Response Association' in 1964, it spearheaded the development of a donation culture in Korea. Following the 2001 amendment of the Disaster Relief Act, it became the nation's only government-designated relief organization authorized to collect and distribute donations for domestic natural disasters.) for wildfire relief efforts in Ulsan, Gyeongbuk and Gyeongnam regions. In January 2026, he donated ₩100 million to Severance Hospital to support treatment costs for pediatric and adolescent patients. In the same month a donation of ₩100 million was also made to support underprivileged female adolescents in South Korea who face financial difficulties in securing menstrual products and maintaining proper hygiene environments through G foundation.

== Public image ==
Byeon has been called "Nation's First Love" by Korean media outlets but personally prefers "Monday Blues Cure" as his favorite title. Cultural critic Kim Heon-sik said Byeon has "unique appeal characterized by a blend of masculinity, androgynous charm, and an image of trustworthiness". Ko Eun-kyung, CEO of KPLUS, described him as a hard worker. In 2024, he was placed 4th in Gallup Korea's Television Actor of the Year.

== Personal life ==
=== Military service ===
Byeon fulfilled his mandatory military service as an administrative officer in the Public Relations Department of the 37th Division from November 2011 to August 2013.

== Discography ==
=== Soundtrack appearances ===
List of soundtrack appearances, showing year released, with selected chart positions
| Title | Year | Peak chart positions | | | Album |
| Title | Year | KOR | KOR Songs | WW | Album |
|---|---|---|---|---|---|
| "Sudden Shower" (Eclipse (Note: Eclipse is a fictional band from the series Lovely Runner. The song is performed by Byeon Woo-seok as vocalist, Lee Seung-hyub as guitarist, Yang Hyuk as bassist, and Moon Yong-suk as drummer.)) | 2024 | 4 | 8 | 167 | Lovely Runner OST Part 1 |
| "Run Run" (Eclipse) | 2024 | 38 | — | — | Lovely Runner OST Part 1 |
| "You & I" (Eclipse) | 2024 | 99 | — | — | Lovely Runner OST Part 1 |
| "No Fate" (Eclipse) | 2024 | 115 | — | — | Lovely Runner OST Part 4 |
| "I'll Be There" (Eclipse) | 2024 | 111 | — | — | Lovely Runner OST Part 4 |
| "Fate Line" | 2026 | — | — | — | Perfect Crown OST Part 11 |
"—" denotes a recording that did not chart or was not released in that region.
