= Pyramid Game (TV series) =

2024 South Korean television series

- Promotional poster
- Hangul: 피라미드 게임
- RR: Piramideu geim
- MR: P'iramidŭ keim
- Genre: Psychological thriller; Survival; Mystery
- Created by: Lee Jae-kyoo
- Based on: Pyramid Game by Dalgonyak
- Written by: Choi Soo-yi
- Directed by: Park So-yeon
- Starring: Kim Ji-yeon; Jang Da-ah; Ryu Da-in; Shin Seul-ki; Kang Na-eon
- Music by: GroovyRoom
- Country of origin: South Korea
- Original language: Korean
- No. of episodes: 10

Production
- Running time: 49–64 minutes
- Production companies: Film Monster; CJ ENM Studios

Original release
- Network: TVING
- Release: February 29 – March 21, 2024

Pyramid Game (Korean: 피라미드 게임) is a 2024 South Korean psychological thriller survival mystery television series created by Lee Jae-kyoo, written by Choi Soo-yi, directed by Park So-yeon, and starring Kim Ji-yeon, Jang Da-ah, Ryu Da-in, Shin Seul-ki, and Kang Na-eon. Based on the Naver webtoon of the same name by Dalgonyak, it tells the story of an all-girls high school where popularity polls are used to rank students in class, and the differential treatment leads to school violence. It was released on TVING from February 29 to March 21, 2024, every Thursday at 12:00 (KST). It is also available for streaming on Viu and Paramount+ in selected regions.

== Synopsis ==
The series follows a transfer student in Baekyeon High School; Seong Su-ji, who realizes there's a covert rank system that's meticulously crafted to bully those in lower ranks. She falls to the bottom of the pyramid and becomes the subject of bullying and violence. After experiencing psychological and physical torture, Su-ji decides to put an end to the Pyramid Game, and bring down the psychopathic mastermind once and for all.

== Cast and characters ==
=== Main ===
- Kim Ji-yeon as Seong Su-ji

A sociable yet straightforward transfer student in class 2–5 of Baekyeon Girls' High School. She gets entangled in a pyramid game and becomes a victim of school violence, but leads a rebellion.

- Jang Da-ah as Baek Ha-rin / Yang So-eun

A dignified student in class 2–5 of Baekyeon Girls' High School with a cleverness behind her gentle demeanor.

- Ryu Da-in as Myeong Ja-eun

A unique student in class 2–5 of Baekyeon Girls' High School, who is always timid, but affectionate towards people and shines brighter in a crowd than she does alone.

- Shin Seul-ki as Seo Do-ah

The class president of class 2–5 and top student of Baekyeon Girls' High School.

- Kang Na-eon as Im Ye-rim

An easygoing idol trainee of Baekyeon Girls' High School with a glamorous daily life.

=== Supporting ===
- Jeong Ha-dam as Go Eun-byeol
- Ha Yeol-ri as Bang Woo-yi

A talkative student of class 2–5 at Baekyeon Girls' High School who is proud and pretentious. She misses and looks up to Ha-rin.

- Hwang Hyun-jung as Kim Da-yeon

The youngest daughter of a chaebol family.

- Lee Joo-yeon as Shim Eun-jung

An aloof and cold promising national swimming team member in Class 2–5 at Baekyeon Girls' High School who is only close with Ye-rim.

- Oh Se-eun as Song Jae-hyung

A hidden idol enthusiast and strategist of class 2–5 at Baekyeon Girls' High School.

- Kim Se-hee as Pyo Ji-ae

A student of class 2–5 at Baekyeon Girls' High School with "glass mentality" who was accustomed to blaming others and defending herself, but undergoes a change after meeting Su-ji.

- Choi Yoon-seo as Gu Seol-ha

An emotionless judo athlete of class 2–5 at Baekyeon Girls' High School.

- Ahn So-yo as Yeon Na-hee

A part-time literature teacher at Baekyeon Girls' High School who is interested in the school violence that occurs in the pyramid game and tries to get to the bottom of it.

- Son Ji-na as Im Sun-ae

The principal of Baekyeon Girls' High School who is trying to hide the school violence.

- Son Ji-young as Ra Hae-joon

The housekeeper of class 2–5 at Baekyeon Girls' High School.

- Yoon Ga-yi as Joo Seung-yi

A student of class 2–5 at Baekyeon Girls' High School.

- Kim Ye-na as Jung Yeon-du
- Song Si-an as Oh Seong-ah

A good-natured and friendly student of class 2–5 at Baekyeon Girls' High School.

- Cho Dong-in as Jo Seung-hwa

An ordinary but somewhat mysterious convenience store part-time worker who got into the Pyramid Game because of Su-ji.

- Jung Ae-yeon as Choi Yi-hwa

Baek Ha-rin's mother who is the daughter-in-law of a chaebol family and chairwoman of Baekyeon Girls' High School.

- Jung Seung-gil as Seo Joong-yeon

Do-ah's father and the hospital director.

- Choi Sung-won as Im Ju-hyeong

An art teacher at Baekyeon Girls' High School who is also the homeroom teacher of class 2–5.

- Lee Da-kyung as Yoon Ye-won

A genius programmer of class 2–5 at Baekyeon Girls' High School.

== Production ==
=== Development ===
In March 2023, TVING confirmed the drama adaptation of the Naver Webtoon Pyramid Game, written and illustrated by Dalggonyak. It is directed by Park So-yeon, written by Choi Soo-yi, created by Lee Jae-gyu, as well as being co-produced by Film Monster and CJ ENM Studios.

=== Casting ===
In June 2023, TVING announced the first cast lineup consists of Kim Ji-yeon, Jang Da-ah, Ryu Da-in, Kang Na-eon, Jeong Ha-dam, Shin Seul-ki, and Ha Yul-ri. In the same month, actresses Hwang Hyun-jung, Lee Joo-yeon, Oh Se-eun, Kim Se-hee, Choi Yoon-seo, Ahn So-yo, and Son Ji-na revealed as the second cast lineup.

== Release ==
TVING production team confirmed that the release date of Pyramid Game would be on February 29, 2024, with four episodes then released two episodes every Thursday until March 21, 2024. It is available for streaming on Viu, and became available on Paramount+ starting on May 30, 2024, in selected regions.

== Accolades ==
=== Awards and nominations ===
Name of the award ceremony, year presented, category, nominee(s) of the award, and the result of the nomination
Award ceremony	Year	Category	Nominee / Work	Result	Ref.
APAN Star Awards	2024	Best New Actress	Jang Da-ah	Nominated	
Asia Artist Awards	2024	Rookie of the Year – Television/Film	Jang Da-ah	Won	
Blue Dragon Series Awards	2024	Best New Actress	Jang Da-ah	Nominated	

=== Listicles ===
Name of publisher, year listed, name of listicle, and placement
Publisher	Year	Listicle	Placement	Ref.
NME	2024	The 10 best K-dramas of 2024 – so far	Included	
NME	2024	The 10 best Korean dramas of 2024	6th place	
Time Magazine	2024	The 10 Best K-Dramas of 2024	7th place	
