= Han Min =

South Korean actor (born 1995)

- Born: May 24, 1995 (age 31); South Korea
- Occupation: Actor
- Years active: 2013–present

Korean name
- Hangul: 한민
- RR: Han Min
- MR: Han Min

Han Min (Korean: 한민; born May 24, 1995) is a South Korean actor. He made his acting debut in the 2013 television series The Secret of Birth.

In October 2026, Han announced he was leaving the agency King Kong by Starship, which he had been with for 14 years, to start a solo career.

== Filmography ==
=== Film ===
Year	Title	Role	Notes	Ref.
2023	Guest			

=== Television series ===
Year	Title	Role	Notes	Ref.
2013	The Secret of Birth	Park Su-chang	Acting debut	
2014	12 Years Promise	Park Moo-chul		
2018	Life	Park Jae-hyuk		
2020	Graceful Friends	young Jung Jae-hoon		
2021	Scripting Your Destiny			
2021	You Are My Spring	Park Cheol-do		
2023	Joseon Attorney			
2023	Twinkling Watermelon	Baek Su-tak		
2025	The Haunted Palace	Seo Jae-il		
2025	The Nice Guy	Cheon-ho		
2026	The Legend of Kitchen Soldier	Lee Min-gu		
