= Mukrimhoe =

Korean ink painting movement

Mukrimhoe (Korean: 묵림회), literally translated in English to Ink Painting Society, was an avant-garde Korean ink painting collective and movement that heralded the adoption of abstraction within the ink painting circles of 1960s Korea. The group was founded by painter-professor Suh Se-ok (1929–2020) at The Department of Oriental Painting at Seoul National University and lasted from March 1960 to June 1964. Their influence supported the dissolution of borders between abstract and figurative painting and also between western and eastern artwork. This paradigm shift in the painterly communities led to the adoption of the “nonfigurative painting” category at the National Art Exhibition and led to new abstract ink painting departments being established at universities. Their visual experimentation was characterized by simplifying and deconstruction Hàn-jī characters, smearing ink, splattering ink, and intermingling various techniques and mediums inspired by Western modernism. The main aim was to create a genre of ink painting that transcended cultural binaries and allowed for the complete freedom of expression. Mukrimhoe was ultimately a short-lived group due to ideological and conceptual differences between the founder and the other group members, many of whom were his students, but overall the group played a crucial role in transforming ink painting with Western concepts of abstraction and material.

== Background ==
Muk is Korean black ink made from resin-burned soot. The ideological structures delineating the tenets of sumuk (ink painting) was established by painter-theorist Hyeong-ho in the 10th century. Sumuk expressed the 5 cardinal colors with just black ink and was so justified through the principle of Yin and Yang. It was also inspired by Buddhist paintings. In the early 1950s, the acceptance of abstraction in the then-called “oriental painting” art world was sought in the form of experimentation with Western modernism, such as Cubism, Futurism, and Expressionism, by individual artists such as Kim Ki-chang and Park Rae-hyun; followed by Kim Young-ki and Lee Ungno. Oriental painters at this time were charged with ushering the “modernization” of Korean painting, (while paradoxically representing nationalistic values) and spearheaded the ink painting movement.

Before this turn towards modernism, the oriental art departments stressed Chinese and subsequently Japanese aesthetics, during occupation, in training. In the early 1950s Suh Se-ok was inspired from the Cubist style found in Kim Ki-chang's (1913–2001) and Park Rae-hyun's (1920–1976) work. Suh Se-ok, the founder of Mukrimhoe who was trained in Chinese calligraphy and literati painting, began experimenting with deconstructed Chinese characters, reducing them to bold and active ink strokes. With this burgeoning experimentation happening within oriental painting circles, Mukrimhoe was established on March 5, 1960.

== History ==
In March 1960, the group had its first exhibition of 16 artists. Although the initial intent of the group was to make abstract oriental paintings, most of the artists still held a strong attachment to figurative painting. Due to this discrepancy between Suh Se-ok's outspoken (and well documented) intentions for the group and the actual pieces shown, the identity of the group was and continues to be dubious in the eyes of history. Also, the struggle of wills between the leader and the artists led to only 8 members exhibiting in the second exhibition in December 1960. It wasn't until the 6th exhibition the group put on that membership increased. This was due to the establishment of a loose set of standards for membership: must be under the age of 35, have a strong desire to create and innovate, have a grasp of Western and Eastern painting techniques. Rules were roughly followed as some artists like Geum Dong-won continued to only make traditional oriental painting. For others figuration and abstraction were still internalized, so aesthetic and stylistic orientations were never truly settled within the group. The 9th exhibition the group held was in June 1963. By the next year, Suh Se-ok stepped down as leader in June 1964 due to internal conflicts over management and ideological issues.

== Artistic style ==
Members’ works consisted mainly of landscapes and figurative scenes that pulled from their respective traditional ink painting training rather than any sort of abstraction. Other artists infused their work with Western matiere such as collage, oil painting, and glue-infused-paint. Documentation of the artwork and exhibitions exists solely through newspaper publications so it has been difficult to track any visual developments or transformations from one group exhibition to the next. Therefore, the general conundrum of stylistic experimentation within the group can be illustrated by following the trajectories of a few of the group's key artists: Suh Se-ok, Min Kyung-gap, Ahn Dong-suk, Jeong Tak-young, and Cha Pyeong-ri. Each of these artists' approaches to abstraction was idiosyncratic and teetered on a spectrum between Western modernism and the traditions of ink painting. From flattening the form to the departure from ink into Western materials, one can see why the delineations between the well established Oriental ink painting traditions and Western Painting were blurred by the boom of abstraction. There were also artists who never interacted with the group as members who became established abstract ink painters in their own right such as Kwon Young-woo and Ahn Sang-Cheol. Mukrimhoe was a collective attempt at breaking free from the traditions of figurative ink painting in response to the confluence of foreign and national influences and agendas. The group's works represent a unique consciousness that was molded by Japanese, European, and ancient Korean painting.

== Suh Se-ok ==
At the first exhibition (1960 March) Suh Se-ok exhibited Noon (1958–59), which featured sharp bold strokes resembling boomerang shape that weigh heavily upon each other, and also Twilight of Yeongbeonji (1955) a piece with thinner strokes and some repetitive vertical strokes, with ink wash bleeding on the sides. At the 3rd National Exhibition in 1954 Suh's work Chapter of Cloud and Moon won the Minister of Education Award.

At the group's second exhibition (1960 December) Suh's piece Ceremony for Rain expressed rain through the effect of flowing ink strokes that overlapped in a chaotic manner. He reduced forms into clear ink strokes reminiscent of calligraphy.

At the third group exhibition (February 1961) Seo showed Chaimu, an abstract rendition of a peacock whose feathers were represented through a dabbling effect of ink that formed a halo around a simplified body figure. In his pieces City and Seasons, concrete shapes disappear altogether and ink wash is used to fill the paper. These works show abstraction through simplification of form and sink stroke. From 1962 to 1965 Suh Se-ok incorporated matiere, mixing glue and ink for a textured surface.

== Min Gyeong-gap ==
Min Gyeong-gap (b. 1933) was also a writer and the group's successor after Suh Se-ok. His work was considered by member Jeong Tak-young to be the most innovative since the first exhibition due to his use of chance processes such as dunking paper into mixtures of ink. None of his works from the 1st exhibition remain. In 1960, his piece Work was shown and depicted a blotchy mountain based on the amorphous qualities of Informal painting.

In 1961, he used overlapping layers of glue and ink in Work (Production) and his Alive series. Min Gyeong-gap developed his style in the context of Western Informel painting, which he saw in Japanese art magazines.

== Ahn Dong-suk ==
Ahn Dong-suk (b. 1922) exhibited his piece January (1958) at the 5th group exhibition in 1961. His paintings feature a Modernism-based abstract expressionism. Untitled, now owned by National Museom of Modern and Contemporary Arts, made in 1950s and showed structural and compositional abstraction that delineated the subject and background into color fields. His paintings simplifies objects through a flattening effect.

In 1963, his piece Untitled utilized a woven grass matt as a canvas and broke the formal tradition of oriental painting formats. Ahn Dong-suk explored beyond traditional materials and techniques of ink painting and freely introduced modern materials such as acrylic and oil paints and paint rollers. To him, as he stated,”the process of modernizing Oriental painting is possible through experimentation with materials.”

== Jeong Tak-young ==
Jeong Tak-young (b.1937) showed Mountain (1960) “Mountain” in the 2nd group exhibition. He used various shades of ink to show the dissipation of forms, leaving only hints of a mountain form. Figurative form remained intact, but one can see the process of dismantling figurative tradition in his work.

== Cha Pyeong-ri ==
From the 3rd to 7th group exhibition he exhibited pieces from his Outsiders series. Through ink wash painting he simplified human forms thru expressive, bleeding lines. For example, his Two Travelers piece shown in the 5th group exhibition featured two semi-abstract, semi-figurative forms that highlighted the expressiveness of ink as a spiritual medium.

== Controversy and legacy ==
Kang Seon-Hak argued that abstract painting of any kind in the Oriental art world should be excluded from the category of Oriental painting, viewing it as an independent genre. In the 1950s, Kim Yeoun-gi (1911–2003) proposed the wording “Korean Painting” over “Oriental Painting” when referring to ink painting in order to honor the modernization of ink painting which had, “changed from imitation to creation.” Lee Kyu-seon agreed with the new rebranding and founded the Korean Painting Association in 1965. For this group, the tomb mural of Goguryeo served as inspiration for a new national ink painting palette that introduced an ink painting color palette that went beyond Japanese standards. Critic Park No-soo supported the introduction of color into the development of a Korean ink painting lineage. The discipline of “Oriental Painting” and its adherence to imitation of masters was installed during Japanese colonization. The term “Korean Painting” was adopted by the National Art Exhibition in 1982. The new view towards color brought respect to expanding beyond typically black ink paintings. Abstract ink artist Lee Jong-sang made work about the Goguryeo tombs murals for the National Art Exhibition showing the connection between abstraction, color, and search for a cultural origin.

In 1963 confrontations in the ink painting community between figurative (traditional) painting and abstract ink painting arose during the São Paulo and Paris Biennale. Artists like Park Seo-bo, Kim Ki-chang, and Suh Se-ok argued that abstract ink painting should be included as a contemporary global art. On the other hand, people like Lee Yeol-mo asserted that since abstraction originated in the West, Korea should be represented by its own “unique” ethno-national art form. Traditional ink painting was inscribed with Korean nationality and was widely exhibited and institutionalized in Korea while abstract ink painting was shown more prominently at international exhibitions.

Song Soo-nam, an artist who led the ink-wash painting movement which championed anti-commercialism and anti-idealism, criticized Mukrimhoe for adopting Western colors and paint into ink painting. Song published “Sumukhwa” in 1974, a stylistic guide for ink painting grounded in historical traditions. He is representative of the Oriental painters who were loyal to ink painting tradition and safeguarded their practice from any Western Influences.

In 1969, the National Exhibition's Western painting category was divided into figurative and non-figurative painting, so Suh Se-ok started petitioning and devising to divide the Oriental painting category into the same two categories. Some abstract ink painters didn't like the inclusion of abstract ink painting into the National Exhibition since they feared “the academization of experimental (ink painting)” would hinder free experimentation. Also the subdivisions of the Western and Oriental categories raised discussions on whether or not there's a need to differentiate Western from Oriental abstraction. Nevertheless, in 1970 the first award under the title of “Non-Figurative Oriental Painting” was bestowed upon Lee Kyu-seon's painting Yeorae at the 19th National Exhibition. Also, Suh Se-ok's painting Unhan, which focused on the theme of the cosmos and spirituality, won the newly established President's Award.

In the 1970s, “Post-Mukrimhoe” era, also known as the “Post-Oriental Painting” Movement, artists such as Shin Young-sang, Jeong Tak-young, Lee Gyu-seon, Hwang Chang-bae did not concern themselves over whether abstract ink painting was a result of influence Western abstraction, they pursued experimentation as a means to express themselves in new ways. Abstract ink painters insisted that there was “one painting” which transcended the dichotomy of East and West- ideologically though, they still conflated East with “nature” and West as not. In 1974, non-figurative Oriental paintings and non-figurative Western paintings were shown in the same area by critic Oh Kwang-soo. To Oh, “there’s no division between non-representational Eastern and Western painting. I just see non-representational paintings…What criteria divides them? Medium, technique, or perhaps, it is a matter of spirit?”

Critics like Oh, Lee Gyeong-seong, and Park Yong-sul believed a general lack of subject consciousness in abstract paintings made by Korean artists, the artists were intent on producing an effect without thinking of the cultural context of their work. Their idea was a generalization that didn't take into account abstract ink artists who were pursuing a lost “Korean identity” or cultural origin. Song Young-bang insisted that the spirit of East and West differed even if visually there was little difference. Informel overlapped with abstract oriental painter's rejection of modern civilzaion and returning to a sort of primitive purity. Both Western and Oriental (ink) abstract painters seem to long for an unsullied bygone historical referent as seen in their pieces’ names like “Stone Age” and “Zone of Zero” particularly after the 5/16 coup. Funnily enough, especially in the 1980s, Western painting artists like Lee Songsoo-nam experimented with traditional painting- further blurring the lines between Western and Oriental abstract painting.

Overall, despite pushback from traditionalists in the ink painting community and criticism regarding the visual similarities to Western Informel painting, Mukrimhoe played a key role in establishing abstraction in ink painting circles. He was trying to create, “a new methodology of Oriental painting that meets the contemporary aesthetic consciousness.”

== Members ==
Main Members: Dong-sook Ahn, Shin Young-sang, Yang Jeong-ja, Lee Seok-woo, Yong-jae, Keum Dong-won, Yoo Nam-sik, Kim Won
