= Shin Seul-ki =

South Korean actress

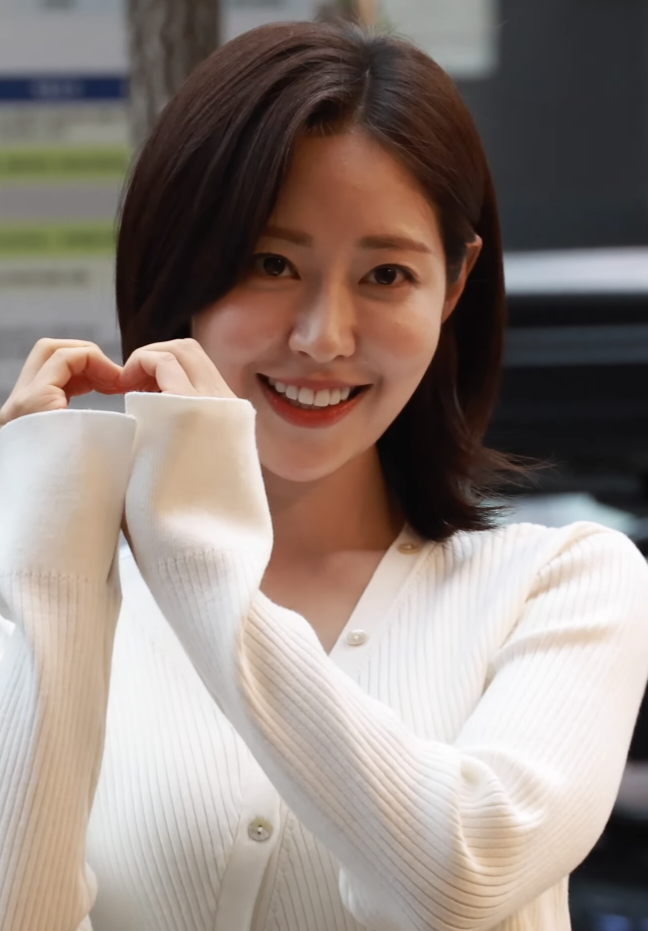
- Shin in July 2025
- Education: Seoul National University
- Occupation: Actress
- Years active: 2021–present
- Agent: Big Smile Entertainment

Korean name
- Hangul: 신슬기
- RR: Sin Seulgi
- MR: Sin Sŭlgi
- Website: bigsmile-ent.com/artist/shinseulki/

Shin Seul-ki (Korean: 신슬기) is a South Korean actress. She participated in the South Korean reality television series Single's Inferno in 2022 and made her acting debut in the psychological thriller series Pyramid Game in 2024.

== Early life and education ==
Her grandfather, Shin Seong-sik, is a painter and one of the founding members of the South Korean painting collective Mukrimhoe.

She attended Yewon School and Seoul Arts High School. In 2023, Shin graduated from Seoul National University with a degree in music, majoring in piano. During university, Shin participated in the announcer club. Additionally, she passed and completed a sports announcer internship with SPOTV.

== Career ==
In 2020, Shin Seul-ki was crowned as the 90th Miss Chunhyang, a traditional Korean beauty pageant in Namwon, North Jeolla Province. With her prize money, she donated 20,000 masks to the Namwon flood victims.

In 2021, she appeared in a music video for Kim Jae-hwan's song "Unforgettable".

In 2022, she joined the second season of Netflix's reality dating show Single's Inferno.

On April 17, 2023, Big Smile Entertainment announced that Shin has signed an exclusive contract with the talent agency. In June 2023, Shin was cast in the TVING Original drama Pyramid Game in the role of Seo Do-Ah, the Class 5-2 president and game moderator.

On February 29, 2024, Seulki made her acting career debut in TVING's psychological thriller series Pyramid Game. She received praise from the media for her gripping and accurate character portrayal and synchronization of the character Seo Do-ah, and clear vocalization. At the production press conference, Shin shared that during audition, she realized she may have been cast for the role of Do-Ah when the director asked her to try on a pair of glasses. She credited her announcer internship experience to aiding her acting vocalization skills.

In May 2024, on the MBC talk show Radio Star, Shin's first mainstream media interview appearance, she shared that her father did not know she had joined Single's Inferno until he saw the show's promotional billboard. She also said that prior to Singles Inferno 2, she had received offers to join other dating programs, but ultimately committed to Singles Inferno because the filming period fit with her academic school schedule.

On August 28, 2024, SBS and Big Smile Entertainment announced that Shin will be joining the upcoming SBS historical fantasy romantic comedy series The Haunted Palace in the role of Choi In-seon. The drama premiered on April 18, 2025.

On December 18, 2024, it is announced that Shin will be joining in the upcoming KBS2 family weekend drama, For Eagle Brothers as Dokgo Se-ri. The drama premiered on February 1, 2025. Shin's keen character analysis and colorful portrayal of Seri earned praises for her natural acting abilities.

In March 2025, the professional nail brand, BANDI, selected Shin to be the global beauty's icon new brand ambassador. They explained the decision based on "Seulki's sophisticated and nature image match well with the "healthy beauty" value that BANDI pursues." The partnership is expected to help BANDI expand to other major K-beauty retailers such as Olive Young and Chicor.

In May 2025, Seulki was confirmed to join the cast for the upcoming SBS' romantic comedy drama, Would You Marry Me. She played the role of Yoon Jin-kyung, a family medicine doctor.

On December 31, 2025, Seulki received both the KBS Drama Award's Best New Actress Award for her role as Dokgo Seri in For Eagle Brothers and the SBS Drama Award's Best Supporting Actress in a Romantic Comedy Mini Series for her role as Yoon Jin-kyung in Would You Marry Me.

== Filmography ==
=== Television series ===
Year	Title	Role	Notes	Ref.
2024	Pyramid Game	Seo Do-ah	Acting debut	
2025	For Eagle Brothers	Dokgo Se-ri		
2025	The Haunted Palace	Choi In-seon		
2025	Would You Marry Me?	Yoon Jin-kyung		

=== Television shows ===
Year	Title	Role	Notes	Ref.
2022	Singles Inferno	Cast member	Season 2	

=== Music video appearances ===
Year	Song title	Artist	Ref.
2021	"Unforgettable"	Kim Jae-hwan	

== Endorsements ==
Year	Brand	Product	Category	Ref.
2023	Hite Jinro	Model for Plum Blossom Wine (매화수)	Food/Beverage	
2024	Graff	Laurence Graff Signature Collection	Fine Jewelry	
2024	V&A Beauty	Model	Health & Beauty	
2025	BANDI	BANDI	Health & Beauty	

== Awards and nominations ==
Name of the award ceremony, year presented, category, nominee of the award, and the result of the nomination
Award ceremony	Year	Category	Nominee / Work	Result	Ref.
KBS Drama Awards	2025	Best New Actress	For Eagle Brothers	Won	
SBS Drama Awards	2025	Best Supporting Actress in a Miniseries Romantic Comedy Drama	Would You Marry Me?	Won	
