= Jang Da-ah =

South Korean actress and model (born 2001)

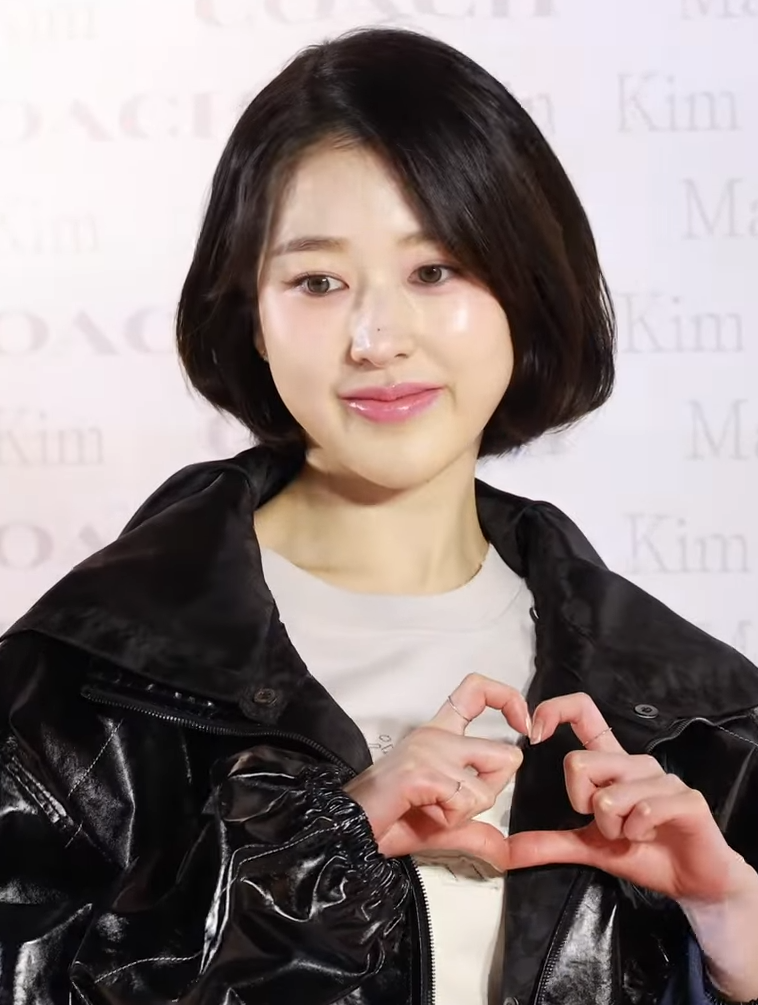
- Jang in 2025
- Born: Jang Jin-young; May 5, 2001 (age 25); Seoul, South Korea
- Education: Ewha Womans University
- Occupations: Actress, model
- Years active: 2023–present
- Agent: King Kong by Starship
- Family: Jang Won-young (sister)

Korean name
- Hangul: 장진영
- RR: Jang Jinyeong
- MR: Chang Chinyŏng

Stage name
- Hangul: 장다아
- RR: Jang Daa
- MR: Chang Taa

Jang Jin-young (Korean: 장진영), known professionally as Jang Da-ah (Korean: 장다아; born May 5, 2001), is a South Korean actress and model under King Kong by Starship. She is best known for her role as Baek Ha-rin in Pyramid Game.

== Early life ==
Jang Da-ah was born in Ichon-dong, Seoul, South Korea, on May 5, 2001. She has a younger sister, Jang Won-young, who is a member of the South Korean girl group Ive.

== Career ==
On April 7, 2023, Jang signed with King Kong by Starship. The report stated that she would debut as an actress and go by the stage name Jang Da-ah. Her profile was revealed along with her first appearance in public as a model for Acuvue. On May 26, the agency confirmed that Jang would make her acting debut in the TVING original drama Pyramid Game (2024) based on the Naver webtoon of the same name. The series aired in February 2024 with Jang playing the lead role of Baek Ha-rin, a mysterious and popular student whose elegant appearance belied a sociopathic personality. Jang came to international attention for her role, which was positively received by critics, with NME praising Jang for her authentic characterization of the cold-blooded, narcissistic Baek Ha-rin. For her performance, she was nominated for Best New Actress at the 3rd Blue Dragon Series Awards and the 10th APAN Star Awards, and won Rookie of the Year at the 9th Asia Artist Awards. For her sophomore effort, Jang starred in the 2025 ENA series My Troublesome Star as the young version of Uhm Jung-hwa's character, Im Se-ra. In 2026, Jang made her film debut with the horror film Salmokji: Whispering Water, playing Moon Se-jeong, a young PD who runs a horror vlog channel.

== Endorsements ==
In April 2023, Jang made her modeling debut in an advertisement for Acuvue. In May, she became the new muse of beauty brand Suiskin. In May 2025, Jang modeled for South Korean clothing brand Kenneth Lady. As a model, Jang has been featured in publications such as Cine21, Allure Korea, Men Noblesse, and Singles Korea.

== Filmography ==
=== Film ===
Year	Title	Role	Ref.
2026	Salmokji: Whispering Water	Moon Se-jeong	

=== Television series ===
Year	Title	Role	Ref.
2024	Pyramid Game	Baek Ha-rin	
2025	My Troublesome Star	young Im Sera / Bong Cheong-ja	

== Awards and nominations ==
Name of the award ceremony, year presented, category, nominee of the award, and the result of the nomination
Award ceremony	Year	Category	Nominee / Work	Result	Ref.
APAN Star Awards	2024	Best New Actress	Pyramid Game	Nominated	
Asia Artist Awards	2024	Rookie of the Year – Television/Film	Pyramid Game	Won	
Blue Dragon Film Awards	2026	Best New Actress	Salmokji: Whispering Water	Pending	
Blue Dragon Series Awards	2024	Best New Actress	Pyramid Game	Nominated	
Brand of the Year Awards	2024	Female Rookie Actress	Jang Da-ah	Won	
Buil Film Awards	2026	Best New Actress	Salmokji: Whispering Water	Nominated	
