= Song Su-nam =

South Korean artist (1938–2013)

- Born: 1938; Jeonju, Zenranan Province, Korea, Empire of Japan
- Died: 2013 (aged 74–75)
- Education: Hongik University
- Known for: Ink Painting
- Notable work: Summer Trees
- Movement: Sumukhwa

Korean name
- Hangul: 송수남
- Hanja: 宋秀南
- RR: Song Sunam
- MR: Song Sunam

Song Su-nam (Korean: 송수남, Song Soo-nam, 1938–2013) was a South Korean artist active from 1964 until 2013. Song Su-nam (also known by the artist name "Namcheon," or "Namchun") is recognized as a key leader in the mid-century revival of Korean traditional art and the South Korean ink wash painting movement. His art is characterized by monochromatic ink, abstract subjects, natural imagery, as well as traditional "Oriental" technique.

== Life ==
Song Su-Nam was born in 1938 in Jeonju, Korea. He graduated from Hongik University with a Bachelor of Fine Arts in Korean painting and returned to teach there from 1975 until 2004 as a professor and chairman of the department of Oriental Painting. During his time as a professor, he directed the Hongik University Museum. Later, he served as a director of Hongik University Museum Song has held exhibitions at the Museum of Far Eastern Antiquities in Stockholm, Tokyo International Biennale, São Paulo Art Biennial, International Modern India Ink Painting Exhibition, among others. He additionally served as a judge of the Korean Art and Culture Foundation's Grand Art Contest. Much of his artwork was displayed in a special exhibition at the National Museum of Modern and Contemporary Art, Korea.

== Career and style ==
Korea has had a history of ink wash painting since its importation, likely under the Goryeo Dynasty, which continued into the Joseon Dynasty. After a period of national instability—caused by events such as the Russo-Japanese War and colonization under the Japanese empire, as well as lasting tensions with North Korea from the Korean War—the 1960s marked a time of artistic uncertainty in South Korean intellectuals and artists. Many artists and colleges choose to either embrace modernist Western and Japanese influences, such as still-lifes or landscapes done in oil paint, or continue adhering to traditional Korean art techniques.

As a student, Song Su-nam felt that oil paint (which many South Korean artists used) could not properly reflect his Korean ancestry. Early in his career, Song rejected Western painting in favor of modernizing traditional Korean ink painting. Directly out of university, he collaborated in the formation of a short-lived art movement based in Seoul known as "Post-Artist" in 1965, which prioritized “post-abstraction”, based on the philosophy of art critic Bang Geun-taek, who argued in favor of the globalization of Korean art during the effort to modernize. Bang was especially fond of the Western "informalist" painting style, which became central in debates about the integrity of "modern" ink painting.

Song also participated in the "sumukhwa" movement (Korean: 수묵화, ink painting; also known as the oriental ink movement) of the mid-late 20th century. The "sumukhwa" movement sought to revitalize traditional Korean painting techniques in order to rebuild a national identity in a post-war nation, while also adapting to the modern globalized world through abstraction.

Song disagreed with the idea of the nature of abstraction being foreign, and his artistic focus narrowed in on adapting the traditional Korean technique and figure to an abstract nature. He criticized Suh Se-ok and the Mukrimhoe group, as well as many other Korean artists, for adopting Western influences such as the use of Western paints in their polychrome works.

Song often scientifically experimented with different mediums, in one instance mixing black ink with water on mulberry paper. This creation facilitated the minimalist shapes that he believed showed the essence of his subject.

Song Su-Nam's visual language is defined by black-ink painting, repetitive markings, and abstraction of traditional ideas. Thematically, his artwork embodies many traditional ideas, namely that of "cheoninhapil": the union of nature and humanity. In this, his work aligns with that of literati, or ink-wash painting. Literati painting traditionally features calligraphy alongside a painted scene, most frequently a natural one, painted in ink-wash or watercolor. Song's work evolved from traditional landscape to heavy abstraction in the height of his career, with a concentration on repetitive brushstrokes and monochromatic contrast. Song's early paintings were characterized by realistic landscapes, with rolling hills, sparse trees, and rivers, many of which of depicting his hometown, Jeonju. These earlier works were much more reminiscent of truly traditional landscape painting than his later works. The meticulousness of his earlier work is replaced over time with the process-focused, visible brushstrokes of his later paintings, paralleling the modernization effort gaining ground in the Korean art space in the 1970s.

Song Su-Nam worked alongside names like Jung Tak-Young in the mid-century Korean art scene. His art was shown in exhibitions around the world, both during and after his lifetime- including galleries in Sweden, Tokyo, and Hawaii. His work is widely collected in South Korea, both by private collectors and museums. In 1980, Song published a catalogue of the various exhibitions he participated in, following a University of Hawaii campus' dedication of the Korean Studies department in Song's name, and a celebratory gallery showcase.

Today, most of his works reside in private collections, South Korea’s National Museum of Modern and Contemporary Art, and the Hongik University Museum of Modern Art.

== Artworks ==
=== Summer Trees, 1983 ===
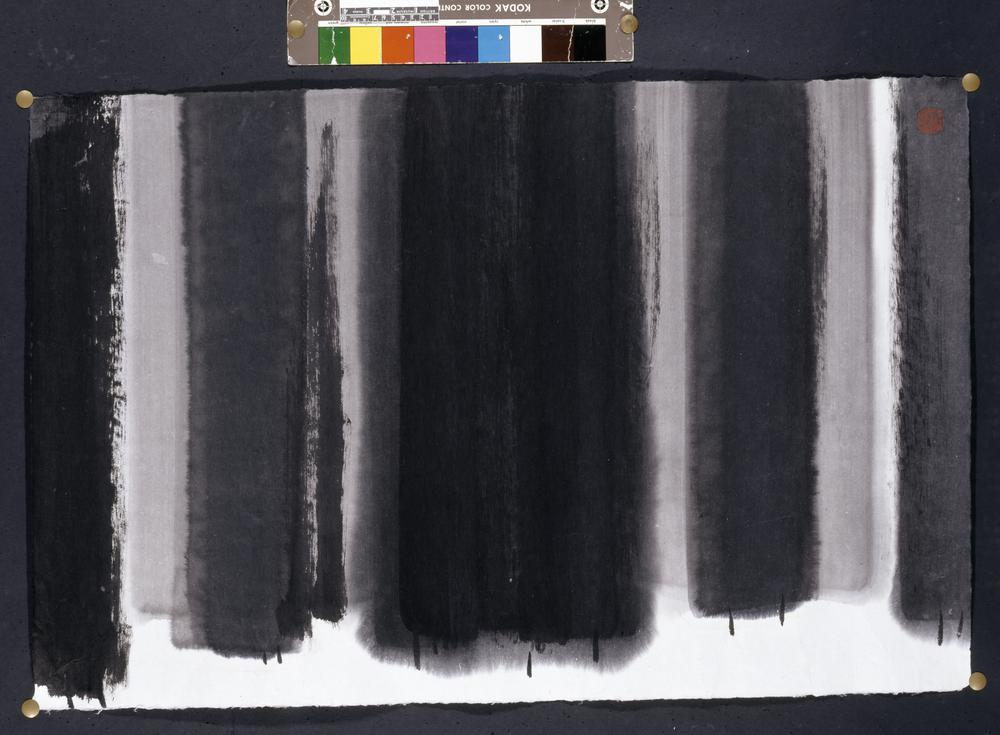
Unmounted ink painting by Song Su-nam (born 1938). Abstract design of vertical lines and stylized trees. Ink on paper. Image sourced from the British Museum

Summer Trees is an ink painting on paper made in 1983 abstractly depicting a cluster of trees via tall, thick vertical lines in tonal shades of grays. Song uses the wet-on-wet technique which involves wet ink being applied to wet paper. This technique leads to the fuzzy borders seen around the thick line strokes. Some believe the array of trees is meant to represent ideals of friendship. The abstract use of form was possibly inspired by Western abstraction and Western works such as Pungent Distances by Morris Louis, though it may also be a convergent discovery fueled instead by modernist expressionist and Korean tradition. Song created multiple versions of Summer Trees from 1978 until 2000, when he fully embraced abstraction. This work is now held at the British Museum in London. This work is one of the 250 featured artworks in the AP Art History curriculum.

=== Diamond Mountains, 1968 ===
Diamond Mountains is an ink painting on paper made in 1968 which abstractly depicts an array of mountains. Song uses abstract form via elliptical lines. The work is monotone, featuring only shades of gray.

== Awards ==
- 1990: "The 16th Joong Ang Culture Award", JoongAng Daily
- 1996: "The Most Literary Korean Artist Award", in commemoration of 100 years of contemporary Korean literature

== Exhibitions ==
In 1980, Song Su-nam published a catalogue of all previous exhibitions in which he participated, beginning in 1964 with the "Invitational Exhibition of Contemporary Painters", hosted by the National Museum of Modern Art in Seoul. In 1981, Song was featured in an exhibition titled "Korean Contemporary Ink Wash Painting" at the National Museum of Modern and Contemporary Art in Seoul, which was participating in the national movement to revitalize traditional art forms in the public eye. The most recent exhibition of his work was held at the National Museum of Modern and Contemporary Art in 2014, a collection of donated works by Song Su-nam's family.

== See also ==
- Ink wash painting
- Mukrimhoe
- List of Korean painters

== Bibliography ==
- Oh, Kwangsu, “Structure and Meditation: The Recent Work of “Namchun” Song Soo-Nam”. Rho Gallery, https://rhogallery.com/song-soo-nam-2002/?ckattempt=2. Accessed 12 March 2026.
- “Song Soo-Nam”. Artnet Gallery, https://www.artnet.com/artists/song-soonam/. Accessed 11 March 2026.
- “Song Soo-nam”. The British Museum, https://www.britishmuseum.org/collection/term/BIOG14391. Accessed 12 March 2026.
- Kee, Joan. “The Curious Case of Contemporary Ink Painting.” Art Journal, vol. 69, no. 3, 2010, pp. 88–113.
- Park, Soo-mee (February 26, 2004). "Artist's willingness to experiment with Korean ink bent boundaries". Korea JoongAng Daily. Archived from the original on December 18, 2014.
- Kee, Joan, “Jung Tak-young and the Making of Abstract Ink Painting in Postwar Korea”, Art Bulletin. Published December 2019.
- Song, Su-Nam, "Exhibition of Song Su-Nam: in the commemoration of the dedication of new Center for Korean Studies building", University of Hawaii/Honolulu. Published 1 March 1980.
- "6th BIFF Poster", BUSAN International Film Festival, https://www.biff.kr/eng/html/archive/arc_history.asp?pyear=2001&page_name=poster.
- "Special Exhibition of Donated Works: Song Soo-nam", National Museum of Modern and Contemporary Art, Korea. https://www.mmca.go.kr/eng/exhibitions/exhibitionsDetail.do?menuId=1030000000&exhId=201405120000083. 13 May 2014 - 27 July 2014.
- "Korean Contemporary Ink Wash Painting", National Museum of Modern and Contemporary Art. https://www.mmcaresearch.kr/terms/view.do?fid=2290. 18 August 1981 - 2 September 1981.
- Sigur, Hannah. "Song Su-Nam, Summer Trees", Smarthistory. https://smarthistory.org/song-su-nam-summer-trees/. 20 November 2014.
