= King Kong by Starship =

South Korean actors agency

- Type: Private
- Industry: Entertainment
- Founded: 2009
- Founder: Lee Jin-sung
- Headquarters: Seoul, South Korea
- Key people: Lee Jin-sung (founder and division head) (Note: Also CEO at Starship Entertainment.)
- Services: Actors Management
- Owner: Starship Entertainment
- Parent: Starship Entertainment
- Website: starship-ent.com

King Kong by Starship (Korean: 킹콩 by 스타쉽), formerly known as King Kong Entertainment (Korean: 킹콩엔터테인먼트) before the merge in 2017, is a South Korean actors agency that was founded in 2009.

== History ==
It was founded in 2009 by Lee Jin-sung, then an employee of IHQ Inc., and having Kim Bum as the company's first artist.

In 2015, the company was acquired by Starship Entertainment, a subsidiary of Kakao M (now Kakao Entertainment). In 2017, upon the merger of the businesses of the two companies, the company was relaunched as "King Kong by Starship".

== Artists ==
List adapted from official website.

- Ahn So-yo
- Chae Soo-bin
- Cho Si-yeon
- Han Min
- Han So-eun
- Jang Da-ah
- Jo Yoon-hee
- Kim Bum
- Kim Kyung-nam
- Kim Shana
- Lee Da-yeon
- Lee Dong-wook
- Lee Kwang-soo
- Lee Mi-yeon
- Lee Seung-hun
- Park Jae-hyun
- Shin Hyun-soo
- Shin Seung-ho
- Song Seung-heon
- Woo Hyun-jin
- Yoo Yeon-seok
- Yoon Hyun-soo

== Former artists ==
- Cheon Young-min
- Cho Yoon-woo
- Choi Hee-jin (2017–2024)
- Choi Won-myeong (2017–2024)
- Go Ara (2023–2026)
- Han Chae-ah (2011–2012)
- Im Soo-jung (2018–2022)
- Jang Hee-jin (2012–2014)
- Jeon So-min (2020–2024)
- Ji Il-joo
- Ji Woo (2019–2022)
- Jung Dong-hyun
- Jung Joon-won
- Jung Won-chang
- Kang Eun-ah
- Kim Da-som (2010–2021)
- Kim Ji-an (2015–2017)
- Kim Ji-won (2014–2019)
- Kim Min-ji (2019–2021)
- Kim Seung-hwa (2022–2026)
- Kim Sun-a (2011–2014)
- Ko Sung-min
- Lee Chung-ah (2009–2014)
- Lee Elijah (2017–2021)
- Lee Ha-nui (2012–2014)
- Lee Jin (2021–2026)
- Lee Jong-hwa (2018–2023)
- Lee Ruby
- Lee Young-yoo (2013–2014)
- Lim Ju-eun (2013–2018)
- Oh Ah-yeon
- Oh Hye-won (2016–2023)
- Oh So-hyun
- Park Hee-soon (2015–2021)
- Park Jubi
- Park Min-woo (2013–2019)
- Park Min-young (2010–2014)
- Ryu Hye-young (2022–2025)
- Seo Hyo-rim (2012–2014)
- Son Woo-hyeon (2021–2026)
- Song Ha-yoon (2019–2025)
- Song Ji-yeon
- Song Min-jung (2011–2014)
- Sung Yu-ri (2010–2014)
- Yoon Jin-yi (2012–2019)

== Awards ==
Name of the award ceremony, year presented, category, recipient of the award, and the result of the nomination
Award ceremony	Year	Category	Recipient	Result	Ref.
APAN Star Awards	2014	Best Manager	Lee Jin-sung	Won	
