= Salmokji: Whispering Water =

2026 film by Lee Sang-min

- Theatrical release poster
- Hangul: 살목지
- Hanja: 殺木池
- RR: Salmokji
- MR: Salmokchi
- Directed by: Lee Sang-min
- Written by: Lee Sang-min
- Produced by: Park Eun-kyung
- Starring: Kim Hye-yoon; Lee Jong-won; Kim Jun-han; Kim Young-sung; Oh Dong-min; Yoon Jae-chan; Jang Da-ah
- Cinematography: Kim Sung-an
- Edited by: Lee Kang-hee
- Production company: The Lamp
- Distributed by: Showbox
- Release date: April 8, 2026
- Running time: 95 minutes
- Country: South Korea
- Language: Korean
- Budget: $2.02 million
- Box office: $22.1 million

Salmokji: Whispering Water (Korean: 살목지) is a 2026 South Korean folk horror film directed by Lee Sang-min. Based on the Salmokji Reservoir in Yesan County, the film stars Kim Hye-yoon, Lee Jong-won, Kim Jun-han, Kim Young-sung, Oh Dong-min, Yoon Jae-chan, and Jang Da-ah. It centers the filming crew, who head to a reservoir to reshoot the scene, encounter something lurking within the dark and deep waters.

The film received positive reviews from both critics and audiences and went on to become the highest-grossing Korean horror film of all time, surpassing the 23-year record previously held by A Tale of Two Sisters (2003).

== Plot ==
A road-view filming crew is sent to a remote reservoir to reshoot footage that was previously deemed unusable due to unexplained visual distortions. Led by Su-in, the team documents the surrounding roads and landscape, but during a routine review of the recordings, they seemingly notice unfamiliar figures and unsettling details that none of them recall encountering while filming.

As the crew investigates the origin of the footage, they learn that the reservoir has been linked to a past incident that was never fully resolved. Tensions rise as additional anomalies appear in newly recorded images, blurring the line in between technical malfunction and deliberate concealment, and the crew begins to suspect that the site itself is connected to a hidden crime.

== Cast ==
- Kim Hye-yoon as Han Su-in

A determined producer director who steps up to lead the reshoot at the reservoir in place of her missing senior colleague.

- Lee Jong-won as Yoon Ki-tae

Su-in's ex-boyfriend and a producer from the same media company. He arrives at the reservoir later to assist the crew.

- Kim Jun-han as Woo Gyo-sil

Su-in's senior PD who previously visited the Salmokji Reservoir and mysteriously disappeared.

- Kim Young-sung as Song Gyeong-tae

A skeptical veteran cameraman, he leads the reshoot at the reservoir after an unexplained figure appears in their footage.

- Oh Dong-min as Song Gyeong-jun

Part of the crew led by Su-in. A former Navy special salvage unit member.

- Yoon Jae-chan as Jang Seong-bin

The youngest PD on the filming team.

- Jang Da-ah as Moon Se-jeong

A junior PD who runs a vlog channel. She joins the crew hoping to capture ghost footage for her content.

== Production ==
The film was produced by The Lamp and later distributed by Showbox.

Casting for the film was announced in stages in 2025. On April 8, Kim was offered the first-billed lead role. The following day, Lee was reported to be in talks for the co-lead. Kim confirmed her participation on the same day. On April 15, Showbox officially confirmed both Kim and Lee in the lead roles. In the following month. Jang Da-ah and Kim Jun-han were announced as additional cast members alongside Kim and Lee. The full ensemble cast, including Kim Young-sung, Oh Dong-min, and Yoon Jae-chan, was also finalized.

Principal photography began in May 2025. On May 14, Showbox posted on X (formerly Twitter) announcing the start of full-scale filming. Some scenes were shot on location at the actual Salmokji Reservoir at South Chungcheong Province. Filming wrapped after approximately three months.

== Release ==
It was released theatrically on April 8, 2026 in South Korea distributed by Showbox.

It will be screened in Panorama section of the 59th Sitges Film Festival in October 2026.

== Reception ==
=== Box office ===
On its opening day, Salmokji: Whispering Water debuted in first place at the South Korean box office, recording 89,912 admissions. Including its pre-release screenings, the film reached a cumulative total of 116,825 moviegoers on its first day, surpassing major competitors including the historical drama The King's Warden and the Hollywood film Project Hail Mary starring Ryan Gosling.

During the weekend of April 10–12, the film continued to dominate the South Korean box office, earning $3.7 million from 536,451 admissions and capturing 47.17% of the total market share. Since its release, it has accumulated $5 million from 724,036 admissions. This marked the strongest opening weekend for a domestic horror film since Exhuma (2024), outperforming recent genre entries such as Noise (2024), Dark Nuns (2025), and The Medium.

By April 14, 2026, six days after its release, the film had reached its break-even point of 800,000 admissions, becoming the fastest South Korean film released in 2026 to achieve this milestone.

The film surpassed 1 million cumulative viewers on April 17, 2026, ten days after its release. By April 23, it had exceeded 1.6 million viewers, more than doubling its break-even point.

As of April 27, the film had surpassed 2 million moviegoers, just 19 days after its release, becoming the first South Korean horror film in eight years to reach this milestone. The film also maintained the top position at the box office for 21 consecutive days, from its release on April 8 to April 28, marking the longest such run for a film released in 2026.

On May 10, It had surpassed 3 million moviegoers, becoming only the second Korean horror film in the past 23 years to reach this milestone.

On May 17, distributor Showbox announced that the film had become the highest-grossing Korean horror film of all time after recording 3.15 million admissions, surpassing the 23-year record set by A Tale of Two Sisters (2003).

=== Critical response ===
Salmokji: Whispering Water scored an average score of 6.29 out of 10 on Cine21. Critics praised the film for its immersive atmosphere and its ability to revitalize the South Korean horror genre. Writing for Maxmovie, Cho Hyun-na highlighted the film's "solid narrative structure," noting its effective use of a multi-layered mystery centered on the Salmokji Reservoir to build tension.

Reviewers also described the film as possessing a "damp realism" that allows horror to "seep into the body," emphasizing the "overwhelming mise-en-scène" created by the reservoir setting. Its technical elements, including the use of "fresh camera techniques" and water as a central horror motif, were further credited with creating an "experiential horror" that reinforces its impact within the genre.

The “exquisite casting” was frequently cited as a major strength of the film. The performance of actress Kim Hye-yoon in her first horror role received critical acclaim. Writing for The Fact, reporter Park Ji-yoon praised her for revealing a "new side" through a "dry, laughter-less expression" and a "restrained emotional performance," marking a departure from her previous romantic comedy roles. Critics noted her ability to subtly convey her character’s psychological transition from rationalism to terror through nuanced physical expressions, such as trembling fingertips and shifting gaze, rather than relying on conventional horror tropes. Her portrayal was described as the "solid center" of the ensemble cast, and she was subsequently referred to as a new "horror queen" by multiple South Korean media outlets.

Actor Lee Jong-won was also recognized for his "delicate expressive power" and "distinctive voice," which heightened the psychological dread." The chemistry between Kim and Lee was also highlighted, with their portrayal of ex-lovers Su-in and Ki-tae adding a layer of "unexpected romance" to the horror through subtle gazes and nuanced tension, without detracting from the film's suspense.

Furthermore, Oh Dong-min was praised for his "bold acting" and intense screen presence, while Jang Da-ah was noted for her "sharp, cold charm" in her big-screen debut.

The film was collectively viewed as a successful "resurgence of Korean horror," bolstered by "exquisite casting" and a solid narrative structure.

=== Cultural Impact ===
Following the box office success of the film, the Salmokji Reservoir emerged as a popular tourist attraction, particularly among visitors seeking to experience its surrounding atmosphere. Increased nighttime visits, roadside parking, and camping activity around the reservoir were widely reported following the film’s release. Local officials credited the film with boosting local tourism in the area, while the surge in visitors prompted authorities to implement safety measures and limit nighttime access to the site.

The commercial success of the film also contributed to renewed public interest in Yesan County's local folklore and oral storytelling traditions. Media coverage surrounding the film also highlighted youth-led cultural initiatives that documented regional ghost stories and reinterpretations of local history through folk horror narratives.

== Accolades ==
| Award ceremony | Year | Category | Nominee | Result | Ref. |
|---|---|---|---|---|---|
| Blue Dragon Ranking Awards (Note: The Blue Dragon Ranking is a popularity award organized by Sports Chosun, the organizer of the Blue Dragon Film Awards and Blue Dragon Series Awards. It recognizes trend-setting actors by presenting semiannual awards for Best Actor and Best Actress.) | 2026 | Best Actress Award (Note: First Half of 2026.) | Kim Hye-yoon | Won | |
| Buil Film Awards | 2026 | Best New Actress | Jang Da-ah | Nominated | |
| Buil Film Awards | 2026 | Best New Director | Lee Sang-min | Nominated | |
| Korean Association of Film Critics Awards | 2026 | Technical Award | Kim Young-ho | Won | |
| Korean Association of Film Critics Awards | 2026 | Top 10 Films of the Year | Whispering Water | Won | |
