= Yoon Jae-chan =

South Korean actor and singer (born 1999)

- Born: November 30, 1999 (age 26); South Korea
- Occupations: Actor; singer
- Years active: 2020–present
- Agents: Major9; Golden Moon
- Musical career
- Genres: Hip-hop
- Instrument: Vocals
- Years active: 2020–2022
- Formerly of: Xro

Korean name
- Hangul: 윤재찬
- RR: Yun Jaechan
- MR: Yun Chaech'an
- Website: www.goldenmoon.co.kr/actors/yoon-jae-chan/

Yoon Jae-chan (Korean: 윤재찬; born November 30, 1999) is a South Korean actor and singer. He made his acting debut in 2022, and best known for his roles in Twinkling Watermelon (2023) and The Winning Try (2025). Before pursuing his acting career, he participated on the reality competition shows Produce 101 season 2 (2017) and Extreme Debut: Wild Idol (2021). He is a former member of the duo Xro.

== Career ==
Yoon made his first television appearance in 2017, by participating on Mnet's reality competition series Produce 101 season 2 as one of the four The Vibe Label trainees but failed to debut and placed 55th overall. He then made his idol debut as a member of the duo Xro on July 16, 2020, with the single album Welcome to My Jungle. In 2021, Yoon joined Extreme Debut: Wild Idol as contestant number 28 but eliminated and made his acting debut on KakaoTV's Fly Again. In 2022, Yoon was cast for HBO Max's Além do Guarda-Roupa and Playlist's Dowdy Guys, with the former released the next year. In 2023, he continue his acting career by playing in the first episode of tvN X TVING project O'PENing 2023 titled "Summer, Love Machine Blues", tvN romantic fantasy coming-of-age drama Twinkling Watermelon, and Playlist's Oh My, Oh My God!. Yoon got his first nomination at the 2023 APAN Star Awards for portraying Park Seung-pil in Dowdy Guys. In 2024, Yoon signed with Golden Moon. He then cast in MBC TV psychological thriller crime drama Doubt and tvN romantic comedy Love Your Enemy. He also star in Shortcha's b-boying drama Ready to Beat. In 2025, Yoon joined the cast of SBS TV sports drama The Winning Try, has been cast in the horror film A Place to Kill, which would make his big screen debut, and SBS TV romantic comedy workplace Sold Out on You. Yoon won his first Best New Actor Award for portraying Ko Se-ho in Doubt at the 7th Daejeon Special FX Festival's DFX OTT Awards, which was held on November 28, 2025.

== Filmography ==
=== Film ===
Key
†	Denotes films that have not yet been released

Film appearances
Year	Title	Role	Notes	Ref.
2026	Salmokji: Whispering Water	Sung-bin	Big screen debut	

=== Television series ===
Key
†	Denotes television productions that have not yet been released

Television series appearances
Year	Title	Role	Notes	Ref.
2023	Além do Guarda-Roupa	Chul-woo	Brazilian TV series	
2023	O'PENing 2023	Kim Jang-hwan	Episode: "Summer, Love Machine Blues"	
2023	Twinkling Watermelon	Kang Hyun-yul		
2024	Seoul Busters	Nam Jung-hyun		
2024	Doubt	Ko Se-ho		
2024	Love Your Enemy	Yoo Hong-jae		
2025	The Winning Try	Do Hyung-sik		
2026	Sold Out on You	Hwang Ki-hong		

=== Web series ===
Web series appearances
Year	Title	Role	Notes	Ref.
2021	Fly Again	Kim Geon		
2022	Miracle	Zen		
2022	Dowdy Guys	Park Seung-pil		
2023	Oh My, Oh My God!	Jeong Hyeon-gyu		
2024	Ready to Beat	Do-hyun		

=== Reality shows ===
Television show appearances
Year	Title	Role	Notes	Ref.
2017	Produce 101	Contestant	Season 2; Placed at rank 55	
2021	Extreme Debut: Wild Idol	Contestant	Eliminated in episode 7	

=== Web shows ===
Web show appearances
Year	Title	Role	Notes	Ref.
2017	Wanna One Go: Zero Base	himself	Appeared in episode 4	

== Awards and nominations ==
Name of the award ceremony, year presented, category, nominee of the award, and the result of the nomination
Award ceremony	Year	Category	Nominee / Work	Result	Ref.
APAN Star Awards	2023	Excellence Award, Actor in a Webseries	Dowdy Guys	Nominated	
DFX OTT Awards	2025	Best New Actor	Doubt	Won	
