= Twinkling Watermelon =

2023 South Korean television series

- Promotional poster
- Hangul: 반짝이는 워터멜론
- Lit.: Sparkling Watermelon
- RR: Banjjagineun woteomellon
- MR: Pantchaginŭn wŏt'ŏmellon
- Genre: Fantasy; Romance; Coming-of-age; Time travel
- Developed by: Studio Dragon (planning)
- Written by: Jin Soo-wan
- Directed by: Son Jeong-hyeon; Yoo Beom-sang
- Starring: Ryeoun; Choi Hyun-wook; Seol In-ah; Shin Eun-soo
- Music by: Fara Effect
- Country of origin: South Korea
- Original language: Korean
- No. of episodes: 16

Production
- Executive producer: Lee Hye-young (CP)
- Producers: Yoo Beom-sang; Park Hae-min
- Running time: 70 minutes
- Production company: Pan Entertainment
- Budget: ₩15.6 billion

Original release
- Network: tvN
- Release: September 25 – November 14, 2023

Twinkling Watermelon (Korean: 반짝이는 워터멜론) is a 2023 South Korean television series directed by Son Jong-hyun, and starring Ryeoun, Choi Hyun-wook, Seol In-ah, and Shin Eun-soo. It aired on tvN from September 25 to November 14, 2023, every Monday and Tuesday at 20:50 (KST) for 16 episodes. It is also available for streaming on Viu, Viki and Netflix in selected regions.

== Synopsis ==
Twinkling Watermelon tells the story of a CODA boy with a natural talent for music, who fights with his father to pursue his dream of becoming a guitarist in a band. After the fight, he travels back in time to 1995. He joins a band with his childhood father and forms a band called Watermelon Sugar with the suspicious youths he meets there, and communicates with them through music.

== Plot ==
Ha Eun-Gyeol is the youngest son of a nuclear family, his elder brother and parents are deaf and mute. Eun-gyeol has passion and talent for music, which he develops further with a lonely old man who runs a guitar shop. Eun-gyeol secretly performs in street busking shows and becomes a part of a band.

While performing on a stage show, Eun-gyeol is caught by his father Yi-chan who is disappointed to hear he dreams of a career in music. In an outburst of anger, Eun-gyeol tells him he's not their family interpreter and can not live only to satisfy his expectations. He decides to quit music after the altercation and attempts to sell his guitar at a mysterious shop and gets transported back in time to 1995.

He meets Yi-chan as a highschool student and is astonished to see he does not have speech or hearing impediments. He befriends him, joins his band and makes it his mission to ensure he does not get into an accident that caused him to lose his hearing. Yi-chan is pursuing music to impress Choi Se-Kyung, a popular cello player. He stumbles across Yoon Chung-Ah, who is extremely reserved.

Choi Se-Kyung's behavior changes almost overnight, being more outgoing and bubbly with Yi-chan and his friends. Eun-gyeol learns his mom Chung-Ah is mistreated by her stepmother and is prohibited from learning sign language. He convinces her father to let him teach her sign language. Eun-gyeol later learns Se-Kyung is actually Eun-yoo (Se-Kyung's daughter) who also time travelled like him. Gradually, Eun-gyeol and Se-Kyung develop feelings for each other and so do Chung-Ah and Yi-Chan.

Eun-Gyeol thwarts multiple dangerous situations that risk Yi-chan's life. He also helps Chung-Ah's father bond with her better and expose the stepmother and her children for mistreating her. Despite all of Eun-Gyeol's efforts, Yi-chan gets severely wounded in a car accident while attempting to save Eun-Gyeol. He loses his hearing and is heartbroken but Eun-gyeol persuades him to never give up.

Shortly after, Eun-Gyeol is transported back to his present life and is initially disappointed that he couldn't save his father. But, he learns that the school band had not grown apart. Chung-Ah's dad had helped them financially and best of all, Yi-chan still pursues music, overcoming his disability. He also meets and reunites with Eun-yoo.

== Cast ==
=== Main ===
- Ryeoun as Ha Eun-gyeol
  - Jung Hyeon-jun as young Ha Eun-gyeol

Eun-gyeol is the only hearing person (CODA) in a family of deaf people. He is a model student by day, and a guitarist in the band at night. After having an argument with his father, where his father learned of his musical interest, Eun-gyeol time slips to 1995 and meets his parents when they were younger. He strives to know more about his parents' youths and shine their lives.

- Choi Hyun-wook as Ha Yi-chan
  - Choi Won-young as adult Ha Yi-chan

Yi-chan is a hot-blooded boy who seems to have jumped out of a cheerful cartoon. He lives with his grandmother who owned an accommodation house named Snail House. In the present, Yi-chan is Eun-gyeol and Eun-ho's father, who can neither longer speak nor hear. He is proud of Eun-gyeol's achievements as a model student at school who he hopes will become a doctor.

- Seol In-ah as Choi Se-kyung / On Eun-yoo
  - Lee So-yeon as adult Choi Se-kyung

Choi Se-kyung is the cello goddess of Seowon Arts High School who was considered to be everyone's muse with her innocent beauty and elegant aura reminiscent of a scene in a movie. She was idolized by many boys either from her school or neighboring schools. Se-kyung is the daughter of the owner of Viva Music, a store that existed during Eun-gyeol's childhood. In the present, she has inherited the Viva Music store which has been redeveloped into a luxurious home. She keeps her father's handmade guitar, which she gives to Eun-gyeol as her father had wished.
On Eun-yoo: Se-kyung's daughter who looks exactly like her during her youth. Her mother dolls her up and forces her to become a cellist to follow in her footsteps. She lives in a disharmonious family until she is 18 years old, when her parents divorce. Upset with her mother's controlling behavior and her drinking habit, and after finding out that her father has remarried, she time slips to 1995 so that she can find her mother's first love, and cease her existence.

- Shin Eun-soo as Yoon Chung-ah
  - Seo Young-hee as adult Yoon Chung-ah

As a child, Chung-ah was a cold and isolated girl who was born deaf. She dreams of a sparkling life like the great Mexican painter Frida Kahlo. Chung-ah is aloof towards other people except to Choi Se-kyung, who is much friendlier toward her. In the present, she is the loving mother of Eun-gyeol and Eun-ho and owns a chicken restaurant.

=== Supporting ===
==== Band members ====
- Ahn Do-gyu as Oh Ma-joo
  - Kim Hyeong-beom as adult Oh Ma-joo

Ma-joo is the band manager and Yi-chan's childhood friend. He is knowledgeable and resourceful. In 2023, Ma-joo owns MJ Entertainment who manages a famous rockstar Yoon Dong-jin.

- Yoon Jae-chan as Kang Hyun-yul
  - Song Chang-eui as adult Kang Hyun-yul

A genius bassist, Hyun-yul was a former member of gangster and bullies called Jindo Dog. After meeting Choi Hyun, the owner of Baekya Music Store, he changed his life and started focusing on music.

- Lee Ha-min as Lee Si-guk
  - Ryu Soo-young as adult Lee Si-guk

A drummer from the church band. He is very short tempered especially toward Yi-chan's antics.

- Lee Soo-chan as Noh Se-bum
  - Jin Tae-hyun as adult Noh Se-bum

Se-bum is a talented keyboardist who majored in classical piano and studied abroad early.

==== Eun-gyeol's family ====
- Choi Won-young as Eun-gyeol's father
- Seo Young-hee as Eun-gyeol's mother
- Bong Jae-hyun as Eun-ho

Eun-ho is Eun-gyeol's older brother who is born deaf and dreams of becoming a national Paralympics taekwondo athlete. Due to his handsome appearance, Eun-ho is popular on social media, to which he has been addicted since childhood.

==== Snail Boarding House ====
- Go Doo-shim as Go Yang-hee, Yi-chan's grandmother and the owner of boarding house.
- Lee Seok-hyung as Jung Bal-san, a college student at a boarding house run by Yi-chan's grandmother.

==== People around Eun-gyeol ====
- Chun Ho-jin as Choi Hyun / Grandpa Viva
  - Park Ho-san as younger Choi Hyun

Choi Hyun is the owner of musical instrument store Baekya Music, later renamed as Viva Music. He was a famous rock star whose popularity decreased after his girlfriend became pregnant. His girlfriend is actually Choi Se-gyeong's real mother. He is supportive of aspiring musicians who seek his advice about music even later in life, when he tutors Eun-gyeol on the guitar.

- Jung Sang-hoon as master of the mysterious musical instrument store La Vida Music. Through the store, Eun-gyeol and Eun-yoo time travel to 1995. He keeps in touch with both time travelers through their dreams by calling them on phones, even broken ones.
- Woo Je-yeon as On Ji-hwan, a second-year student at Myeongsae University Medical School who serves as vocalist and guitarist for the band Golden Scalpel. He is Choi Se-gyeong's boyfriend and later her husband, and also Eun-yoo's father. However, their marriage falls apart because of their different approaches to parenting.

==== People of Jinsung Instruments ====
- Kim Tae-woo as Yoon Geon-hyung, Cheong-ah's father who is the chairman of Jinseong Musical Instruments. As a businessman, he frequently travels so he has no idea how abusive Cheong-ah's step mother is.
- Kim Joo-ryoung as Lim Ji-mi, Cheong-ah's live-in tutor and later stepmother who serves as chairwoman of Seowon Arts High School Foundation. She uses harsh methods to torture Cheong-ah, who will be the next chairwoman of Jinseong Group.
- Kwon Do-hyung as Yoon Joo-yeop, Lim Ji-mi's biological son and Cheong-ah's stepbrother.
- Lee Soo-min as Yoon Sang-ah, Lim Ji-mi's biological daughter and Cheong-ah's stepsister who is a student at Seowon Arts High School. She looks down on poor boys no matter how handsome they are.

==== Others ====
- Koo Jun-hoe as Goo Jun-hyung, the main vocalist of Spine 9 who senses hears Eun-gyeol's musical talent and attempts to recruit him into his band.
- Yeon Oh as Jeong Ji-oh, Spine 9 bassist.
- Han Min as Bae Soo-tak, Spine 9 drummer.
- Kim Jun-hyung as Yoon Dong-jin
  - Yoon Do-hyun as Yoon Dong-jin (2023), Chuncheon National University legendary guitarist.
- Kim Ye-ji as Mira Lee
- Kim Mi-hwa as the Landlady

=== Special appearances ===
- Kim Hae-jun as Choi Jeon, the DJ of a tteokbokki restaurant.
- Park Han-sol as Eun-ho's girlfriend

== Production ==
On September 5, 2023, production company Pan Entertainment announced that it has signed a production and supply contract with Studio Dragon for Twinkling Watermelon worth 15.6 billion won.

== Viewership ==
Twinkling Watermelon was ranked number one in viewership in twelve regions including the United States, Canada, the United Kingdom, Germany, Netherlands, Belgium, Czechia, Denmark, Sweden, New Zealand, Saudi Arabia, and more in the week the drama's finale episode was released. Furthermore, it also charted in the top five in 64 countries.

Twinkling Watermelon : South Korea viewers per episode (thousands)

Season	Episode number																Average
Season	1	2	3	4	5	6	7	8	9	10	11	12	13	14	15	16	Average
1	644	664	738	1040	808	801	803	694	860	788	744	833	823	850	771	972	802

Source: Audience measurement performed nationwide by Nielsen Korea.

Average TV viewership ratings
Ep.	Original broadcast date	Average audience share (Nielsen Korea)	
Ep.	Original broadcast date	Nationwide	Seoul
1	September 25, 2023	3.144% (2nd)	3.503% (2nd)
2	September 26, 2023	3.311% (1st)	3.387% (2nd)
3	October 2, 2023	3.441% (1st)	3.726% (1st)
4	October 3, 2023	4.688% (1st)	4.805% (1st)
5	October 9, 2023	3.689% (1st)	4.393% (1st)
6	October 10, 2023	3.580% (1st)	4.106% (1st)
7	October 16, 2023	3.551% (1st)	4.042% (1st)
8	October 17, 2023	3.089% (1st)	2.922% (2nd)
9	October 23, 2023	3.718% (1st)	4.380% (1st)
10	October 24, 2023	3.512% (1st)	3.738% (1st)
11	October 30, 2023	3.264% (1st)	3 569% (1st)
12	October 31, 2023	3.790% (1st)	4.236% (1st)
13	November 6, 2023	3.689% (1st)	4.179% (1st)
14	November 7, 2023	3.593% (1st)	4.050% (1st)
15	November 13, 2023	3.494% (1st)	3.802% (1st)
16	November 14, 2023	4.460% (1st)	4.458% (1st)
Average		3.626%	3.957%
In the table above, the blue numbers represent the lowest ratings and the red numbers represent the highest ratings.; This series aired on a cable channel/pay TV which normally has a relatively smaller audience compared to free-to-air TV/public broadcasters (KBS, SBS, MBC and EBS).

== Reception ==
According to Good Data Corporation, Twinkling Watermelon concluded by setting a record for rising buzzworthiness share for seven consecutive weeks and securing first place in TV+OTT drama buzzworthiness in its final week. In the week it concluded, Choi Hyun-wook ranked third, Ryeoun fifth, and Shin Eun-soo eighth in TV+OTT drama performer buzzworthiness.
