= My Troublesome Star =

2025 South Korean TV Series

- Promotional poster
- Hangul: 금쪽같은 내 스타
- Lit.: My Golden Star
- RR: Geumjjokgateun nae seuta
- MR: Kŭmtchokkat'ŭn nae sŭt'a
- Genre: Romantic comedy
- Developed by: KT Studio Genie
- Screenplay by: Park Ji-ha
- Directed by: Choi Young-hoon
- Starring: Uhm Jung-hwa; Song Seung-heon; Lee El; Oh Dae-hwan
- Music by: Jin Ha-di
- Country of origin: South Korea
- Original language: Korean
- No. of episodes: 12

Production
- Running time: 60 minutes
- Production companies: Jumbo Film; Studio Bom

Original release
- Network: ENA; Genie TV
- Release: August 18 – September 23, 2025

My Troublesome Star (Korean: 금쪽같은 내 스타) is a 2025 South Korean television series starring Uhm Jung-hwa, Song Seung-heon, Lee El, Oh Dae-hwan, and Jang Da-ah. It aired on ENA from August 18, to September 23, 2025, every Saturday and Sunday at 22:00 (KST). And also subsequently streaming on Genie TV.

The drama follows the story of a once-celebrated actress who, after a mysterious accident, wakes up 25 years later in a completely different life, embarking on a journey to reclaim her lost stardom.

The series is also available for streaming on Viu in selected regions.

== Synopsis ==
My Troublesome Star centers on Im Se-ra, a renowned South Korean actress. At the height of her career, Se-ra is involved in a car accident that leaves her unconscious. When she awakens, she finds herself 25 years in the future, inhabiting the body of a 50-year-old woman living in a modest, rundown rental room. With no recollection of the intervening years and her fame a distant memory, Se-ra is shocked to discover her fall from grace. Determined to reclaim her status as a top star, she navigates the challenges of a changed entertainment industry and her own transformed circumstances.

== Cast and characters ==
=== Main ===
- Uhm Jung-hwa as Im Se-ra / Bong Cheong-ja
  - Jang Da-ah as young Im Se-ra / Bong Cheong-ja

A celebrated actress who wakes up 25 years after a car accident in an unfamiliar body and life, determined to restore her former glory.

- Song Seung-heon as Dokgo Cheol
  - Lee Min-jae as young Dokgo Cheol

A former hotshot detective now relegated to the traffic division due to an unexpected incident. His life takes a dramatic turn when he encounters Bong Cheong-ja, who claims to be the legendary actress Im Se-ra, who shook South Korea 25 years ago before disappearing.

- Lee El as Ko Hui-yeong
  - Lee Da-yeon as young Ko Hui-yeong

A former supporting actress who lived in Im Se-ra's shadow, swallowing bitter tears. After Se-ra's disappearance, Hee-young seizes the opportunity to become a global star. She grows wary and defensive when rumors of Im Se-ra's return surface.

- Oh Dae-hwan as Kang Du-won
  - Heo Gun-young as young Kang Du-won

The powerful CEO of TwoOne Entertainment, who was once Im Se-ra's beleaguered road manager 25 years ago. Having survived the cutthroat entertainment industry, he has achieved success but remains cautious and deferential in the presence of the re-emerged Im Se-ra.

=== Supporting ===
- Song Si-an as Sa Seon-yeong

=== Special appearance ===
- Ji Jin-hee as Wonban

A top actor whose first love is Im Se-ra.

== Production ==
My Troublesome Star is produced by Jumbo Film and Studio Bom, with Choi Young-huon directing the series who previously directed One the Woman (2021). The screenplay was written by Park Ji-ha, the same scriptwriter for Miss Night and Day (2024).

== Viewership ==
My Troublesome Star : South Korea viewers per episode (thousands)

Season	Episode number											
Season	1	2	3	4	5	6	7	8	9	10	11	12
1	N/A	428	566	808	688	901	777	1012	871	891	902	1069

Source: Audience measurement performed nationwide by Nielsen Media Research.

Average TV viewership ratings
Ep.	Original broadcast date	Average audience share (Nielsen Korea)	
Ep.	Original broadcast date	Nationwide	Seoul
1	August 18, 2025	1.3% (NR)	1.2% (NR)
2	August 19, 2025	1.901% (3rd)	1.775% (3rd)
3	August 25, 2025	2.412% (2nd)	2.263% (2nd)
4	August 26, 2025	3.096% (2nd)	2.781% (2nd)
5	September 1, 2025	3.086% (2nd)	2.628% (3rd)
6	September 2, 2025	3.832% (1st)	3.366% (2nd)
7	September 8, 2025	3.376% (1st)	3.138% (1st)
8	September 9, 2025	4.242% (1st)	3.882% (2nd)
9	September 15, 2025	3.890% (2nd)	3.627% (2nd)
10	September 16, 2025	3.999% (2nd)	3.478% (2nd)
11	September 22, 2025	3.876% (2nd)	3.681% (2nd)
12	September 23, 2025	4.338% (2nd)	3.891% (2nd)
Average		3.279%	2.976%
In the table above, the blue numbers represent the lowest ratings and the red numbers represent the highest ratings.; NR denotes that the drama did not rank in the top 20 daily programs on that date.; This drama aired on a cable channel/pay TV which normally has a relatively smaller audience compared to free-to-air TV/public broadcasters (KBS, SBS, MBC, and EBS).
