= Yi Eungro =

Korean French painter (1904–1989)

- Hangul: 이응노
- Hanja: 李應魯
- RR: I Eungno
- MR: I Ŭngno

Art name
- Hangul: 고암, 죽사
- Hanja: 顧菴, 竹士
- RR: Goam, Juksa
- MR: Koam, Chuksa

Lee Ungno (Korean: 이응노; January 12, 1904 – January 10, 1989) was a Korean-born French painter and printmaker whose works were chiefly focused on Eastern and Korean-style paintings.

After training in traditional inkwash painting in Korea from the 1920s to the 1930s, Lee gradually experimented with Western-style painting techniques in Japan. His works from the 1950s showcase creative attempts at merging Eastern medium and brushstrokes with Western perspective and forms.

After returning to Korea before liberation and developing his early quasi-abstract ink painting style, Lee Ungno relocated to France in 1958, where he fully established his standing as an abstract artist. He is most known for his series of ink and paper collage, abstract letters, and crowd paintings that developed during his stay in France.

Other than painting, Lee Ungno has worked as an art educator in Hongik University after liberation, founded Goam Misul Yeonguso (Goam Art Research Institute) and published a Korean art textbook (동양화감상기법, The Impression and the Techniques of Oriental Painting) in 1956, and also established an Eastern art school, Académie de Peinture Orientale de Paris in the 1960s.

Lee Ungno Museum opened in 2007 in Daejeon, South Korea, to preserve, display, and promote artworks and materials related to the artist. He is credited for forming part of the first generation of Korean abstract artists, and for contributing to the diversification in the use of Eastern material in modern and contemporary art.

== Early life ==
Lee Ungno was born in Hongseong County (홍성, 洪城), Chungcheongnam-do Province (충청남도, 忠淸南道) in 1904 and spent his childhood in Yesan County (예산, 禮山). Lee was taught classical Chinese (한문, 漢文) by his father, and enrolled in Hongseong Botong Hakyo (홍성보통학교, 홍성초등학교, 洪城普通學校) for his primary education, but soon dropped out due to his family's financial situation. Instead of following up on formal education, he helped with farmwork at home and began to study painting by depicting landscapes of Yongbongsan Mountain (용봉산, 龍鳳山), Deoksungsan Mountain (덕숭산, 德崇山), and Sudeoksa Temple (수덕사, 修德寺), eventually training ink painting under the tutelage of literati painter Yeomjae Song Tae-hoe (염재 송태회, 念齋 宋泰會·1872–1942) from 1920.

== Art career in Korea ==
After deciding to pursue a career as an artist and realising the need to overcome traditional conventions to progress in his artistic pursuits, Lee Ungno moved to Seoul in 1922 and became apprentice to celebrated calligrapher-painter-photographer Haegang Kim Gyu-jin (해강 김규진, 海岡 金圭鎭, 1868–1933) from 1923.

In the 1920s, Lee Ungno primarily learned to paint the Four Gentlemen in the 'Haegang style.' In 1924, his inkwash painting of a bamboo, Mukjuk (묵죽, 墨竹, Ink Bamboo), won a prize in the 3rd Annual Joseon Art Exhibition (조선미술전람회, 朝鮮美術展覽會) in the category of Four Gentlemen. However, he soon faced several years of disappointing results in the annual exhibition prizes. In the meantime, he made a living from producing various shop signboards and other calligraphic work, and in 1931, he finally won prizes for Cheongjuk (청죽, 靑竹, Blue Bamboo) and Pungjuk (풍죽, 風竹, Bamboo in the Wind) in the 10th Annual Joseon Art Exhibition in 1931.

Lee Ungno consecutively won prizes in the 11th, 12th, and 13th Joseon Art Exhibition in the Eastern Painting category following the abolishment of the Calligraphy and Four Gentlemen categories, and continued to submit works and win prizes in the Joseon Art Exhibition throughout the colonial period. Yet, Lee Ungno believed that Eastern ink painters should take the Four Gentlemen as a basic skill to build upon and modernize. It was in the early 1930s that Lee Ungno moved on from emulating Kim Gyu-jin's style of painting the traditional Four Gentlemen, and began to produce inkwash landscapes that were influenced by new, modern Eastern ink painting styles and naturalistic renditions found in Western-style paintings.

== Training in Japan ==
After gaining some recognition as a professional artist in Korea in the early 1930s, Lee began to expand his activities to Japan. Lee Ungno won a prize in the 95th Nihon Bijutsu Kyokai Ten (日本美術協会展) in 1935, and won prizes in the 27th and 18th Joseon Art Exhibition, where his ink paintings began to exhibit stronger influences of Western landscapes.

Lee Ungno soon relocated to Japan to expand his knowledge about Western paintings and techniques. He trained under renowned Japanese painter Matsubayashi Keigetsu (松林桂月, 1876–1963) and learned the basics of Western painting in Hongo Kaiga Kenkyusho (本鄕繪畫硏究所), and also enrolled in Kawabata School of Painting (川端畫學校) in Tokyo.

In the late 1930s, he continued to be accepted in several art exhibitions in Japan and Shenzhen, China and also held his first solo exhibition in Hwasin Department Store Gallery, Seoul, in 1939.

== Return to Korea ==
Toward the end of the Pacific War, Lee Ungno sold his newspaper shop in Tokyo and returned to Seoul in March 1945, then moved to Yesan to avoid conscription. After liberation, he returned to Seoul and formed part of the founding members of Joseon Misul Geonseol Bonbu (조선미술건설본부, 朝鮮美術建設本部, Joseon Art Development Center) and Joseon Misulga Hyeophoe (조선미술가협회, 朝鮮美術家協會, Joseon Artists Association). He also organized Dangu Art Association (단구미술원, 檀丘美術院) with fellow Korean artists to overcome remnants of Japanese colonial rule and push for the development of Korean artistic creativity.

From 1948 to 1950, he taught in the Oriental Painting Department of Hongik University, while continuously exhibiting in Seoul, Jeonju (전주, 全州), and Daejeon (대전, 大田) up to the outbreak of the Korean War. By this time, Lee was gradually transitioning to abstraction, using "acts of conscious deformation" to grid "pictorial space using perpendicular lines that are successively layered onto each other to both produce the illusion of spatial recession and reinforce the flatness of the physical support."

During this time, Lee Ungno met Park In-gyeong (박인경, 朴仁景, 1926–present) in 1949, who was studying Eastern painting in Ewha Womans University. When the Korean War broke out in 1950, Lee Ungno moved to Yesan with his family, along with Park In-gyeong, but continued to hold various exhibitions and trained students.

Lee returned to Seoul after ceasefire in July 1953 and held a solo exhibition where he showcased many of his new paintings that depicted scenes from rural life, such as farmlands, markets, farm animals, and people seeking refuge from the war.

Lee continued to hold various solo exhibitions in Seoul during the late 1950s and submitted works to exhibitions like Daehan Misul Hyeophoejeon, but from the late 1950s, Lee Ungno began to look to stage his works outside of Korea. In 1957, his works were sold to Rockefeller Foundation and donated to the New York Museum of Modern Art, and he signed a 5-year contract with World House Gallery. Around this time, Lee received an invitation from the French art critic Jacques Lassaigne to move to France.

In 1958, Lee Ungno left for France with Park In-gyeong, who he married after his divorce with his first wife Park Gwi-hui (박귀희, 朴貴嬉, 1909–2001) before leaving Korea. He held his farewell exhibition at the Central Public Information House, Seoul. This last solo exhibition in Korea before his departure is thought to have "proposed the future of Korean Eastern-style painting" and displayed some of his breakthrough pieces where the breakdown of traditional ink painting and Lee's unique formation of free, rythmatic, yet balanced abstract brushstrokes were successfully deliberated.

== Art career in France ==
After travelling to France in 1958, Lee Ungno spent a year in Germany where he held his first European solo exhibition in Galerie Prestel, Frankfurt, then in Galerie Boisserée, Cologne, followed by a joint exhibition with Park In-gyeong at Kunstmuseum Bonn.

In France, Lee was influenced by Art Informel and European abstract expressionism and became well-recognized for his unique modern painting techniques using traditional Eastern materials. In particular, he developed a novel style of collage using crumpled, cut, and pasted hwaseonji (화선지, 畵宣紙), thin sheets of paper used for calligraphy, and received wide acclaim in both Europe and Korea. In 1962, he signed a contract with Galerie Facchetti in Paris and held a successful Paris debut exhibition of collage pieces that utilised ink and diverse forms of hwaseonji, old newspapers, magazines, and other printed paper. In addition to his collage series, Lee also began to experiment with calligraphic forms and Chinese characters that would develop into his abstract letter paintings.

Lee's works were incredibly well-received in not only France but all of Europe, where he continued to hold many successful solo and group shows throughout his career. In 1963, he participated in "Trois Critiques d'Art Presentent: Un Groupe de Peintres et Sculpteurs," a 3-man show organized by Galerie Max Kaganovitch, Paris. He held solo exhibitions in numerous galleries around Europe, including Musée des beaux-arts La Chaux-de-Fonds and Galerie Numaga, Switzerland, National museet Kobenhavn, Denmark, and Friedrich & Dahlem, Munich. Winning a silver prize in the 1965 São Paulo Art Biennial granted him an even greater prominence as an artist in France.

In 1964, he established Académie de Peinture Orientale de Paris at Musée Cernuschi that recruited and trained students in Eastern painting.

After returning to France from his release in South Korea in the 1970s, Lee Ungno further focused on his abstract letter paintings. He continuously drew from his background in being trained as a calligrapher and ink painter and his understanding of Chinese characters as an "abstract expression of meaning and shapes from nature."

Lee Ungno mostly painted a large group of people with ink in the 1980s, inspired by the democratization movement in Korea after the Gwangju uprising.

== Dongbaekrim incident ==
Lee Ungno did not have biological children but had adopted Lee Mun-se (이문세, 李文世, 1923–1996), his older brother's second son, during his first marriage, and Young-sé Lee (이융세, 1956–present) during his second marriage. During the Korean war, Lee Mun-se was drafted to North Korea where he worked as a teacher and spent the rest of his life. Lee Ungno had travelled to East Berlin in an attempt to meet his son; this propelled him into the so-called Dongbaekrim incident or the East Berlin incident of 1967, where the then Korean Central Intelligence Agency charged some 190 Korean-national artists, professors, and doctors of conducting espionage in East Berlin in the interest of North Korean authorities.

Lee Ungno was convicted and jailed in Daejeon Prison for two and a half years, after which the French government succeeded in having him released and return to France in 1969. While incarcerated, Lee continued to produce art using any materials he could find, such as soy sauce, wooden lunch boxes, toilet paper, ballpoint pens, and rice.

In 1977, Lee Ungno's wife, Park In-gyeong, was involved in yet another political scandal where she was suspected of being an accomplice to the attempted kidnapping of South Korean pianist Kun-Woo Paik (백건우, 白建宇, 1946–present) and actress Yoon Jeong-hee (윤정희, 尹靜姬, 1944–2023) to North Korea in Zagreb. The scandal completely severed Lee Ungno's ties to the South Korean art scene and led to both Lee Ungno and Park In-gyeong applying for and gaining French citizenship in 1983. With his new French citizenship Lee Ungno was able to travel to North Korea to meet his son in 1983, and in 1987, Lee Ungno was invited to hold a solo show in Pyeongyang (평양, 平壤), North Korea.

After a wave of democratization, in 1989, a large-scale "Goam Lee Ungno Exhibition" (고암 이응노전) was hosted by Hoam Gallery, organized by Jungang Ilbosa, and sponsored by Korea Broadcasting Station and Gana Art Center, which marked a long-awaited recovery of Lee's relationship with his homeland. Unfortunately, he died of a heart attack in Paris on 10 January, 1989, a day before the opening day of the exhibition.

== Works ==
According to the artist in 1976, he went through six notable phases in his lifetime as an artist. He focused on obtaining skills in traditional Korean calligraphy and ink painting in his twenties, explored naturalistic depiction in his thirties, experimented with quasi-abstract expressions in his forties, developed his own abstraction in Europe in his fifties, focused on interpretative abstraction (사의적 추상, 寫意的 抽象) in his sixties, and then on calligraphic abstraction (서예적 추상, 書藝的 抽象) in his seventies.

During his stay in France, Lee Ungno developed his unique collage and "arrachage" technique, where he would scrunch up, tear, arrange, and layer various types of paper and use several colours, mostly natural hues, to create multi-layered and freeflowing works.

Lee Ungno's "deconstruction of the calligraphic forms" aligned with the Art Informel movement, but Lee went "beyond experimentation with form to create works using paper and Chinese script" to equally highlight the recomposition of the deconstructed forms and the unique texture and matière he created with paper collage.

I devoted myself to developing what I would like to call as Koreanized abstract painting. My work departed from the linear movements of Eastern paintings, Hanja and Hangeul, and my artistic style was achieved through studies on spatial composition and harmony. "나는 특히 한국의 민족적 추상화를 개척하려고 노력했다. 나는 동양화와 한자, 한글의 선의 움직임에서 출발, 공간구성과 조화로 나의 화풍을 발전시켰다"

His abstract letter series developed from the 1960s, and Lee Ungno experimented with simplifying and evening out relief surfaces on the canvas and systemizing the rhythmic formations of colours, structures, and volume in his earlier experimentations. Lee believed that Chinese characters were abstraction itself as they are an expression of meaning and shapes found in nature. Lee Ungno developed such calligraphic abstraction that borrowed references from Chinese script and ancient Korean stone carvings throughout the 1970s and also emphasised "coincidental appearances of codes and signs" through the application of his earlier collage techniques into the abstract letter works.

Toward the later phase of abstract letters in the 1970s to the early 1980s, Lee Ungno emphasised geometric letters. His return to France from South Korea after his release from prison signalled a brief shift from the 'humorous' tones of his works to 'frugal' or 'cold' images, involving terse and rigid geometric forms. According to Patrick-Gilles Persin, Lee's works only retrieved their original unique, sensitive flexibility in 1979. He also began to utilize Hangeul letters that were visually much geometric in nature than Chinese script.

Toward the late 1970s and 1980s, Lee Ungno's works were introduced to new elements, such as more delicately planned background and tightly structured forms, and the artist harmoniously placed all his visual elements to produce even more sophisticated paintings. Works from the last decade of Lee Ungno's life entail the artist's attempts to continue to experiment with new techniques and medium, such as in the case of his commissioned pieces for Baccarat Crystal Museum and Manufacture nationale de Sèvres, or his folded panel paintings that revisited his past years of training in traditional ink painting.

From 1982, Lee started to exclusively produce the so-called mass or crowd paintings that expressed active movement of people in a collaboration with forms of letters. Many of these paintings omitted colour in both the crowd figures and background, or used very minimal variants of colour. One subtype of the crowd paintings bind three to four figures with thick black outlines and the other resembles traditional Chinese calligraphy and expresses movement and emotion through the repretitive brushstrokes depicting each of the figures within the crowd. Though he lived far from his homeland, the Gwangju Uprising in 1980 greatly influenced the artist and caused him to choose formative elements over complete abstraction in as he thought that it would resonate with the general public.

Lee Ungno's abstract paintings are highlighted today for not only their visual accomplishments but also the artist's creative process itself and as an example of the successful merging of traditional Eastern materials, thought, technique with Western and contemporary artistic practice.

== Solo exhibitions ==
- 1958: solo exhibition to celebrate his moving to France at the Central Public Relations Office in Seoul.
- 1960: solo exhibition at International Contemporary Gallery in Washington, the US.
- 1962: solo exhibitions simultaneously at Galerie Paul Facchetti and the Central Public Relations Center in Seoul.
- 1963: solo exhibitions at Frederick gallery and Dahlem galley in Germany.
- 1964: solo exhibitions at Galerie Numaga in Auvernier, Swiss and Max Kaganovich gallery in Paris.
- 1966: solo exhibition at National Museum of Denmark, Coppenhagen
- 1967: solo exhibition at Galerie Numaga in Neuchâtel, Swiss Auvernier.
- 1969: solo exhibition <Collage 1969–1970> at Galerie Paul Facchetti in Paris.
- 1972: solo exhibition by the Querini Stampalia foundation in Venice, Italy.
- 1973: solo Exhibition at New Smith gallery in Brussels, Belgium.
- 1976: solo exhibitions at Arras gallery in New York, Shinsegae gallery in Seoul, and Goryo gallery in France.
- 1978: solo exhibition <People> at Goryo gallery in Paris.
- 1979: solo exhibition <Folding screens> at Goryo gallery in Paris.
- 1980: solo exhibitions at BIMC gallery, Goryo gallery in Paris.
- 1983: solo exhibitions at Del Naviglio gallery in Milan, Italy.
- 1988: solo exhibition at Simmons gallery in LA, Retrospective exhibition <1950-1980> in New York.

== Publications and films ==
- Lee Ungno, "Appreciation and Techniques of the Oriental Painting", Munwha Kyoyuk publishers (Seoul), 1956.
- Lee Ungno & Pierre Jaquillard, "Calligraphie, Peinture Chinoise et Art Abstrait", Ides et Calendes (Neuchâtel, Swiss), 1973.
- Film "Lee ungno" produced by Atelier Annick le Moine (Paris, France), 1976.
- Lee Ungno, "L'art de peindre à l'encre de Chine", Sarl Koryo (Paris, France), 1978.
- Lee Ungno, Park Inkyung & Tomiyama Daeiko, "Seoul•Paris•Tokyo", Kirokusa Publisher (Tokyo, Japan), 1985.
- Lee Ungno, "L'art de peindre à l'encre de Chine", Atelier de la Bonne Aventure (Versailles, France), 1988.
- Interview "Lee Ungno", Claude Jeanmart, Centre Régional de Documentation Pédagogique de l'Académie de Toulouse (Toulouse, France), 1972.
