= Ryu Da-in =

South Korean actress (born 2000)

- Born: September 29, 2000 (age 25); Busan, South Korea
- Occupations: Actress; model
- Years active: 2020–present
- Agent: Alien Company
- Website: aliencompany.co.kr

Ryu Da-in (Korean: 류다인; born September 29, 2000) is a South Korean model and actress. She made her debut in the JTBC drama, 18 Again in 2020.

== Early life ==
Ryu was born in Busan, South Korea and is an only child. She completed her high school education through the General Educational Development examination.

== Career ==
Ryu used to be a model and worked with YG Kplus. In 2023, she signed an exclusive contract with Aground. In June 2025, Ryu signed an exclusive contract with Alien Company.

== Personal life ==
In March 2024, it was revealed that Ryu is in a relationship with actor Lee Chae-min. The two met on the set of Crash Course in Romance (2023).

== Filmography ==
Key
†	Denotes films that have not yet been released

=== Television series ===
Year	Title	Role	Notes	Ref.
2020	18 Again	Hwang Yeong-seon		
2023	Crash Course in Romance	Jang Dan-ji		
2027	Excitatio †	Kim Ye-jin		

=== Web series ===
Year	Title	Role	Ref.
2024	Pyramid Game	Myung Ja-eun	
