= Sold Out on You =

2026 South Korean television series

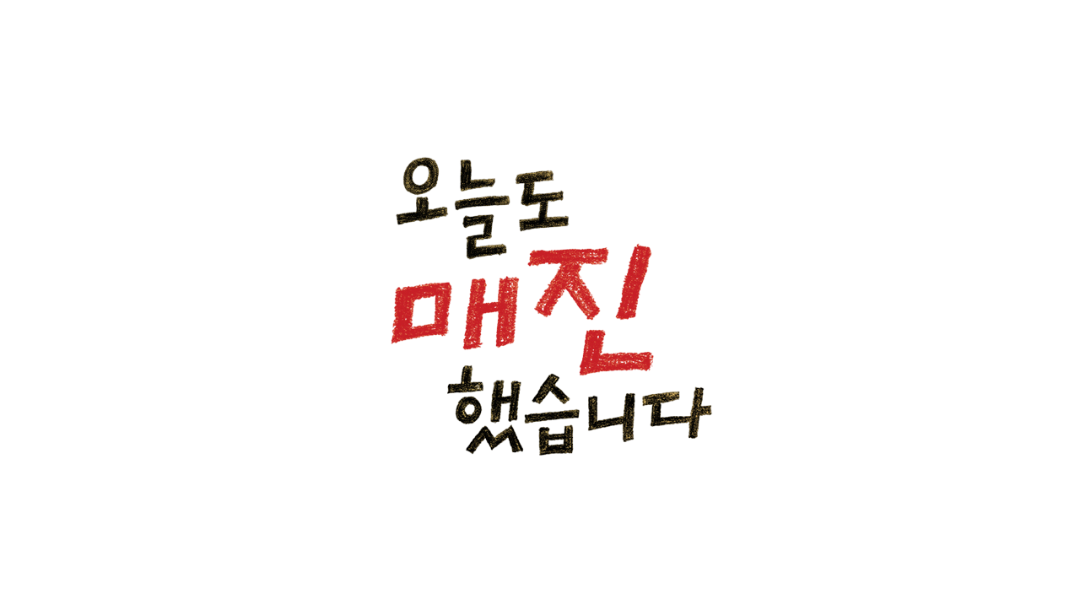
- Hangul: 오늘도 매진했습니다
- Lit.: Sold Out Again Today
- RR: Oneuldo maejinhaetseumnida
- MR: Onŭldo maejinhaessŭmnida
- Genre: Romantic comedy; Workplace
- Written by: Jin Seung-hee
- Directed by: Ahn Jong-yeon; Lee Soo-min
- Creative director: Kim Eun-ji
- Starring: Ahn Hyo-seop; Chae Won-bin; Kim Bum; Go Doo-shim
- Music by: Park Se-jun
- Country of origin: South Korea
- Original language: Korean
- No. of episodes: 12

Production
- Executive producers: Hong Sung-chang; Jung Ah-reum; Jung Yeon-ji; Lee Seul-gi (CP); Lee Yoon-jung; Jo Sung-hoon
- Producer: Park Ye-heea
- Cinematography: Park Seong; Yoon Tae-hoon; Park Min-sung; Kim Dae-kwon
- Editor: Bang Yoon-hee
- Production companies: Studio S; Beyond J; Slingshot Studios

Original release
- Network: SBS TV
- Release: April 22 – May 28, 2026

Sold Out on You (Korean: 오늘도 매진했습니다) is a 2026 South Korean romantic comedy workplace television series written by Jin Seung-hee, directed by Ahn Jong-yeon, and starring Ahn Hyo-seop, Chae Won-bin, Kim Bum, and Go Doo-shim. The series depicts the story of two people who are sincere and passionate about their work but surprisingly neglectful of themselves, as their lives become intertwined 24 hours a day. It aired on SBS TV from April 22, to May 28, 2026, every Wednesday and Thursday at 21:00 (KST). It is also available for streaming on Netflix.

== Synopsis ==
Matthew Lee and Dam Ye-jin meet through a series of day-and-night encounters. As their paths continue to cross, they slowly begin to understand each other's struggles, from his hidden burdens to her battle with insomnia. Through their growing connection, they help one another face personal challenges, heal emotional wounds, and discover love amid the chaos of everyday life.

== Cast and characters ==
=== Main ===
- Ahn Hyo-seop as Matthew Lee / Lee Hae-seok

Co-CEO of Gojeuneok Bio, a natural raw materials company, and a cosmetics researcher known for his technical expertise. Living under the alias Matthew Lee to distance himself from his past as Lee Hae-seok, he operates a large-scale mushroom farm in a rural village, where he is the sole producer of the "white-flowered uri mushroom". Despite his attempts to remain detached, he is an active member of the local community, where he is nicknamed "Mechuri". His life is disrupted when he terminates a contract with the corporation L'Étoile, making him the target of a persistent Ye-jin.

- Chae Won-bin as Dam Ye-jin

A show host at Hit Homeshopping. Following a controversial debut five years prior, she maintains a work-centric lifestyle and suffers from insomnia. After losing her prime-time slot to a rival, she is tasked with securing an exclusive contract with L'Étoile. This mission leads her to Deokpung Village to negotiate with Matthew.

- Kim Bum as Eric Seo

Executive Director of L'Étoile, a global skin care brand, and heir to the Desruets family. After years of traveling to avoid family succession conflicts, he takes a leadership role in the company. He seeks to reconnect with Ye-jin, whom he met in Korea three years ago, using a contract dispute with Gojeuneok Bio as a pretext to return to the country.

=== Supporting ===
People around Matthew

- Yoon Byung-hee as Kang Mu-won

The co-CEO of Gojeuneok Bio and Matthew's primary supporter. A former PR team colleague, he used his father's capital to back Matthew's startup. He frequently offers Matthew luxury gifts and machinery, though he consistently defers to Matthew's business decisions.

People of Deokpung Village

- Go Doo-shim as Songhak Lady / Yang Sang-geum
  - Ko Seo-hie as young adult Sang-geum

The influential matriarch of Deokpung Village. She mentored Matthew when he first arrived five years ago and treats him as a surrogate son.

- Jo Bok-rae as Park Kwang-mo

The foreman of Matthew's farm. Despite a clumsy nature that causes friction with Matthew, he manages daily operations. He has a long-standing unrequited love for Ae-ra and a preoccupation with dating reality shows.

- Kim Seo-an as Na Jin-yi

The owner of Som's Variety Shop. She raised her younger sister independently and is well-integrated into the village, though she maintains a defensive attitude toward Matthew. She later became Ye-jin's assistant host at Hit Homeshopping.

- Ahn Sebin as Na Som-yi
  - Choi Ha-yoon as young Som-yi

Jin-yi's ten-year-old younger sister who shares a bond with Sang-geum.

- Jo Woo-ri as Moon Ae-ra

The owner of Moon Cafe. A former high-achieving student, she returned to her hometown after facing financial difficulties in Seoul. She charges higher prices to city residents and is the object of Kwang-mo's affection.

- Kim Jung-hwan as Jeon Jung-muk

The physician at Woori Deokpung Medical Clinic. He is the stoic confidant to his talkative best friend, Kwang-mo.

- Seo Jin-won as Jeon Won-taek

A veterinarian and Jeong-muk's father. He is lifelong friends with Jong-il.

- Yang Heung-joo as So Jong-il

A livestock farmer and Won-taek's best friend. He and Won-taek are known for their constant bickering.

- Jung Soo-jin as Jeong Nan-sun

Won-taek's wife

- Lee Saeromi as Oh Bun-hong

Jong-il's wife

People around Ye-jin

- Kim Young-jae as Dam Seok-gyeong

Ye-jin's father and a former stage actor who works as a cooking instructor. He is a single parent who manages his daughter's household needs.

- Woo Hee-jin as Song Myeong-hwa

The CEO of Song Beauty and a former actress dubbed as the "Nation's First Love". She retired five years ago following a product controversy involving The Woosu's "Good Morning" cream, which she and Ye-jin promoted together on Hit Homeshopping. She returns as a professional rival when she moves her product line to Hit Homeshopping. She was later revealed as Ye-jin's mother, who left home due to her immaturity and pressure to keep her status as a top actress.

People of Hit Homeshopping

- Park Ye-young as Eom Seong-mi

A television producer known for her blunt personality. She forms a partnership with Ye-jin and develops an attraction to Kwang-mo.

- Park Ah-in as Ji Yun-ji

A top beauty show host and Ye-jin's former mentor turned rival. She actively competes against Ye-jin's projects with high-profile luxury broadcasts.

- Shin Dong-mi as Dong Hyeon-ki

Director of Hit Homeshopping and a former industry-leading show host. To combat the rise of mobile commerce, she assigns Ye-jin the mission to secure the L'Étoile contract.

- Yoon Jae-chan as Hwang Ki-hong

An MD on Ye-jin's production team who has worked with her for three years.

People around Eric

- Ok Ja-yeon as Michelle Desruets

The Deputy CEO of L'Étoile and Eric's step-sister. She engages in a power struggle for control of the family business following Eric's involvement in the company's Korean operations.

- Kim Joong-don as Cha Joong-hoon

The Head of Strategic Planning at L'Étoile and Eric's secretary. He acted as a double agent, providing information to Michelle while managing Eric’s affairs in Korea. Eventually, he chose to stay with Eric after learning the truth about Michelle's plans.

Others

- Chae Dong-hyun as Son Chang-ho

Matthew Lee's former colleague at "The Woosu", who later founded his own company "H.O. Cosmetics".

- Jo Wan-ki as a factory manager of L'Étoile

He was given an order by Michelle to sabotage the launch of a new product that was conceptualized by Eric. He saved a recording of the incident, which he later gave to Eric and Cha Joong-hoon before he surrendered to the police.

- Go Woo-jin as Ui-seok

Ye-jin's ex-boyfriend.

- Eun Sun-woo as Secretary Shin

Michelle's secretary and right hand man.

=== Special appearance ===
- Park Ji-hwan as Moo Joong-ryuk

A celebrity guest of Ye-jin's program on Hit Homeshopping.

- Seo Hyun-woo as Choi Woo-su

Founder, president and CEO of the cosmetics manufacturing company "The Woosu", who was a close friend to Matthew Lee, Mu-won and Chang-ho. He later killed himself through hanging due to the aftermath of a side effects scandal linked to his company's flagship product, "Good Morning" cream.

- Noh Seong-eun as Bong-chan

Songhak Lady's dead son.

- Ahn Sang-woo as a bus driver
- Jo Jin-hyung as Gi-bok
- Nam Kwon-ah as Ms. Okpo
- Jang Eun-sil as Gi-seok

== Production ==
=== Development ===
The series was developed under the working title Some and Shopping (썸 앤 쇼핑) in 2023. It is directed by Ahn Jong-yeon, who helmed Seoul Busters (2024), with the script written by rookie writer Jin Seung-hee. Production is handled by Beyond J, the company behind Nevertheless (2021), The Killer's Shopping List (2022), Somebody (2022), and The Scandal of Chunhwa (2025), along with Studio S and Slingshot Studios.

=== Casting ===
In October 2023, Star News reported that Jung Hae-in had been cast for male lead role. However, OSEN reported the next month that Jung had declined the offer.

In March 2025, Ahn Hyo-seop and Chae Won-bin were cast as lead of the series. Two months later, Ahn and Chae were confirmed to star. Kim Bum along with Go Doo-shim, Park Ah-in, Shin Dong-mi, Jo Woo-ri, and Woo Hee-jin also joined the cast a day after the confirmation of the lead actors. In July 2025, Yoon Jae-chan has been cast. Other supporting cast includes Yoon Byung-hee, Kim Seo-an, Jo Bok-rae, and Park Ye-young.

=== Filming ===
In an interview with Ahn Hyo-seop, it was stated that the principal photography already began in June 2025.

== Release ==
Sold Out on You was confirmed to premiere on SBS TV on April 22, 2026, and would air every Wednesday and Thursday at 21:00 (KST). It is also available for streaming on Netflix.

== Reception ==
=== Critical response ===
Professional ratings
Review scores
Source	Rating
Midgard Times	7/10
Mashable Middle East	3.5/5

Sold Out on You received mixed reviews from international critics. Reviewers generally praised the easy chemistry between Ahn Hyo-seop and Chae Won-bin, the comforting rural atmosphere, and its light-hearted enemies-to-lovers tone, but frequently criticised its predictability, heavy reliance on familiar K-romcom tropes, and loss of momentum in later episodes.

In a review, Decider gave the series a "Stream It" recommendation, praising the leisurely pacing that allows viewers to get to know the main characters deeply before the meet-cute and Ahn Hyo-seop's performance as the grumpy-yet-warm farmer Matthew Lee. Midgard Times awarded the series 7/10, calling it "a sweet enemies-to-lovers ride" with strong lead performances from Ahn Hyo-seop and Chae Won-bin, good pacing, and comedic execution despite a highly predictable plot. The review noted that supporting characters, particularly Kim Bum's role, were underutilised. Mashable Middle East gave the series 3.5/5, describing it as striking a "perfect balance of fun & mystery". The review highlighted the strong chemistry and banter between the leads, Ahn Hyo-seop's comedic timing, Chae Won-bin's performance, and Kim Bum's charm (noting potential for second-lead syndrome), while acknowledging familiar clichés.

A review by Gulf News was more mixed, concluding that the drama "isn't a bad watch. But it isn’t a great one either". It praised the breezy start, light humour, initial chemistry, and Ahn Hyo-seop’s emotional scenes, but criticised the predictable "noble idiocy" tropes, the sidelining of Kim Bum in a weak love triangle, and the gradual reduction of the female lead's arc. Social Ketchup’s review was mixed-positive. It commended the easy chemistry and heartwarming moments between Ahn Hyo-seop and Chae Won-bin, Ahn's "green flag" caring nature, countryside visuals, and overall enjoyability, but noted that the show is very formulaic, has slow pacing in several parts, and "has nothing new to offer" in the crowded rom-com genre.

=== Viewership ===
Sold Out on You : South Korea viewers per episode (thousands)

Season	Episode number												Average
Season	1	2	3	4	5	6	7	8	9	10	11	12	Average
1	545	586	516	505	466	492	448	439	558	518	437	514	502

Source: Audience measurement performed nationwide by Nielsen Korea.

Average TV viewership ratings
Ep.	Original broadcast date	Average audience share (Nielsen Korea)	
Ep.	Original broadcast date	Nationwide	Seoul
1	April 22, 2026	3.3% (12th)	3.7% (9th)
2	April 23, 2026	3.3% (12th)	3.7% (8th)
3	April 29, 2026	2.8% (12th)	2.9% (10th)
4	April 30, 2026	2.7% (17th)	2.8% (15th)
5	May 6, 2026	2.6% (16th)	2.8% (14th)
6	May 7, 2026	2.9% (13th)	3.1% (11th)
7	May 13, 2026	2.5% (15th)	2.8% (10th)
8	May 14, 2026	2.5% (17th)	2.5% (14th)
9	May 20, 2026	3.1% (13th)	3.3% (9th)
10	May 21, 2026	2.8% (15th)	2.6% (15th)
11	May 27, 2026	2.4% (18th)	2.6% (12th)
12	May 28, 2026	2.7% (15th)	2.8% (12th)
Average		2.8%	2.9%
In the table above, the blue numbers represent the lowest ratings and the red numbers represent the highest ratings.
