= Pyramid Game =

South Korean webtoon

^피라미드 게임
- Genre: Drama
- Author: Dalgonyak
- Webtoon service: Naver Webtoon (Korean); Line Webtoon (English)
- Original run: January 24, 2020 – April 22, 2022

Television adaptation(s)

Pyramid Game (Korean: 피라미드 게임) is a South Korean manhwa released as a webtoon written and illustrated by Dalgonyak. It was serialized via Naver Corporation's webtoon platform, Naver Webtoon, from January 2020 to April 2022, with the individual chapters collected. The manhwa has been published in English by Line Webtoon. A South Korean animated series has been announced and the series was released on Laftel. A live-action adaptation was released on TVING on February 29, 2024.

Dalgonyak launched Pyramid Game in Naver's manhwa webtoon platform Naver Webtoon on January 24, 2020.
