= The Haunted Palace (TV series) =

2025 South Korean television series

- Promotional poster
- Hangul: 귀궁
- RR: Gwigung
- MR: Kwigung
- Genre: Romantic comedy; Fantasy; Period drama
- Written by: Yoon Soo-jung
- Directed by: Yoon Sung-sik; Kim Ji-yeon
- Starring: Yook Sung-jae; Kim Ji-yeon; Kim Ji-hoon
- Country of origin: South Korea
- Original language: Korean
- No. of episodes: 16

Production
- Running time: 70 minutes
- Production companies: iWill Media; Studio S
- Budget: ₩20 billion

Original release
- Network: SBS TV
- Release: April 18 – June 7, 2025

The Haunted Palace (Korean: 귀궁) is a 2025 South Korean television series starring Yook Sung-jae, Kim Ji-yeon, and Kim Ji-hoon. It aired on SBS TV from April 18, to June 7, 2025, every Friday and Saturday at 21:50 (KST).

== Synopsis ==
The drama follows Yeo-ri, a shaman who rejects her fate as a medium, and Gang Cheol, an ancient serpent spirit trapped in the body of Yeo-ri's first love, Yoon Gap. As they confront the vengeful spirit Palcheok-gwi, their bodies and souls become entangled in an unusual battle for physical control.

== Cast and characters ==
=== Main ===
- Yook Sung-jae as Yoon Gap / Gangcheori / Kang Chul
- Kim Ji-yeon as Yeo-ri
- Kim Ji-hoon as King Lee Seong

=== Supporting ===
- Shin Seul-ki as Choi In-sun

The only daughter of Choi Won-woo, a prominent family in Joseon.

- Kim Sang-ho as Pung-san
- Son Byong-ho as Kim Bong-in
- Gil Hae-yeon as Neup-deok
- Han So-eun as Queen Park
- Han Soo-yeon as Queen Dowager Da-bi

- Kim In-kwon as Kim Eung-soon
- Cha Chung-hwa as Yeong-geum
- Lee Won-joong as Monk Gassob
- Cho Han-gyeol as Bibi

=== Special appearance ===
- Kim Young-kwang as Gangcheori (soul) / Kang Chul

== Production ==
=== Development ===
The drama, a rom-com fantasy, is directed by Yoon Seong-sik, who worked on Bridal Mask (2012), You Are the Best! (2013), and Mr. Queen (2020), and written by Yoon Soo-jung, who wrote The King's Face (2014) and Cheer Up! (2015).

=== Casting ===
On July 19, 2024, SBS announced Yook Sung-jae, Kim Ji-yeon, and Kim Ji-hoon as the lead actors for the series. In August 2024, it was reported that Shin Seul-ki, Kim Sang-ho, Son Byong-ho, and Gil Hae-yeon were confirmed to appear in the series.

== Viewership ==
The Haunted Palace : South Korea viewers per episode (millions)

Season	Episode number																Average
Season	1	2	3	4	5	6	7	8	9	10	11	12	13	14	15	16	Average
1	1.733	1.580	1.696	1.704	1.615	1.572	1.777	1.794	1.998	1.893	1.605	1.819	1.690	1.745	1.756	2.078	1.753

Source: Audience measurement performed nationwide by Nielsen Korea.

Average TV viewership ratings
Ep.	Original broadcast date	Average audience share (Nielsen Korea)	
Ep.	Original broadcast date	Nationwide	Seoul
1	April 18, 2025	9.2% (3rd)	9.2% (2nd)
2	April 19, 2025	8.3% (2nd)	8.4% (2nd)
3	April 25, 2025	9.3% (3rd)	9.0% (1st)
4	April 26, 2025	9.2% (2nd)	8.8% (2nd)
5	May 2, 2025	8.8% (2nd)	8.2% (2nd)
6	May 3, 2025	8.8% (2nd)	8.3% (2nd)
7	May 9, 2025	9.8% (2nd)	9.6% (1st)
8	May 10, 2025	9.5% (2nd)	9.1% (2nd)
9	May 16, 2025	10.7% (1st)	10.0% (1st)
10	May 17, 2025	9.8% (2nd)	9.3% (2nd)
11	May 23, 2025	8.7% (1st)	8.1% (1st)
12	May 24, 2025	9.7% (2nd)	9.1% (2nd)
13	May 30, 2025	9.8% (2nd)	9.3% (1st)
14	May 31, 2025	9.5% (2nd)	9.1% (2nd)
15	June 6, 2025	9.4% (2nd)	9.0% (1st)
16	June 7, 2025	11.0% (2nd)	10.1% (2nd)
Average		9.5%	9.0%
In the table above, the blue numbers represent the lowest ratings and the red numbers represent the highest ratings.

== Accolades ==
=== Awards and nominations ===
Awards and nominations
Year	Award ceremony	Category	Nominee	Result	Ref.
2025	2025 SBS Drama Awards	Top Excellence Award, Actor in a Miniseries Humanity/Fantasy Drama	Yook Sung-jae	Won	
2025	2025 SBS Drama Awards	Top Excellence Award, Actress in a Miniseries Humanity/Fantasy Drama	Kim Ji-yeon	Won	
2025	2025 SBS Drama Awards	Excellence Award, Actor in a Miniseries Humanity/Fantasy Drama	Kim Ji-hoon	Won	
2025	2025 SBS Drama Awards	Excellence Award, Actress in a Miniseries Humanity/Fantasy Drama	Cha Chung-hwa	Won	
2025	2025 SBS Drama Awards	Best Supporting Actress in a Miniseries Humanity/Fantasy Drama	Gil Hae-yeon	Won	
