= 9th Asia Artist Awards =

2024 edition of award ceremony

2024 Asia Artist Awards
- Official poster
- Awarded for: Outstanding achievements in the music, television and film industry
- Date: December 27, 2024
- Venue: Impact Challenger Hall, Muang Thong Thani, Bangkok, Thailand
- Country: South Korea
- Presented by: Star News; Asia Artists Awards Organising Committee; Motiv 3; Box Live
- Hosted by: Ryu Jun-yeol; Jang Won-young; Sung Han-bin
- First award: 2016
- Website: asiaartistawards.com

Television/radio coverage
- Network: Weverse (Worldwide); U-Next

The 2024 Asia Artist Awards (Korean: 2024 아시아 아티스트 어워즈), the 9th edition, presented by Star News, took place on December 27, 2024, at the Impact Challenger Hall, 1–2, Muang Thong Thani, Bangkok, Thailand. The ceremony was hosted by Ryu Jun-yeol, Jang Won-young, and Sung Han-bin.

During the ceremony, the Artist of the Year [Actor] award went to Kim Soo-hyun, while Park Min-young was awarded the Best Actress of the Year. Byeon Woo-seok took home six awards, including the AAA Popularity Award, AAA Asia Celebrity Award, Best Artist Award, Best Couple Award, Best OST Award, and Best Actor of the Year, making him its most awarded artist.

== Overview ==
The Asia Artist Awards select winners by recognizing notable contributions and achievements by South Korean artists in Asian television, film, and music made throughout the past year.

A red carpet event was held at the Royal Jubilee Ballroom prior to the awards ceremony, which began at 19:00 (KST) (17:00 ICT).

It was broadcast live on TV in Korea on MTN (Money Today Broadcasting) and Weverse globally except in Thailand, Malaysia, the Philippines, Vietnam, and Japan, where it was watched on Astro (Malaysia), Blast TV (Philippines), FPT (Vietnam), J:COM (Japan, VOD), U-NEXT (Japan).

The theme for this year's ceremony is 'Love, Peace, Miracle.' A diverse array of performances were announced, including special collaboration stages, unique special stages, and premiere stages.

=== Selection method ===
'Top Artists' are selected based on the number of video views on the artist's official TikTok account.

=== Artists ===
The following artists attended the award show:

Singers	Actors and Actresses
NewJeans; ZEROBASEONE; &Team; BIBI; SUHO; KISS OF LIFE; BUS (Because of you I shine); NCT 127; NCT Wish; LE SSERAFIM; QWER; TWS; WayV; WHIB; Day6	Kim Min; Kim Soo-hyun; Kim Hye-yoon; Park Min-young; Byeon Woo-seok; Ahn Bo-hyun; Jang Da-ah; Jo Yu-ri; Joo Won; Choi Bo-min; Kentaro Sakaguchi; Norawit Titicharoenrak; Nattawat Jirochtikul

== Winners ==
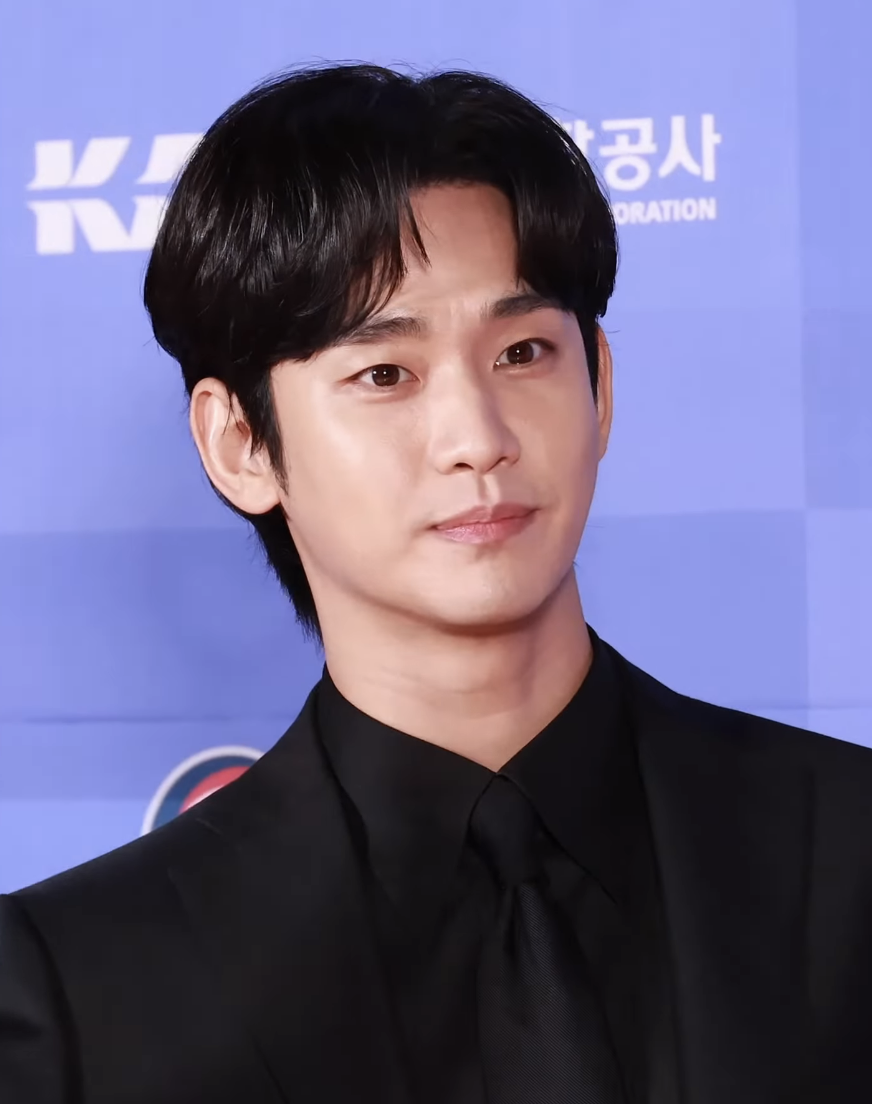
Kim Soo-hyun, winner of Artist of the Year – Actor Grand Prize (Daesang)

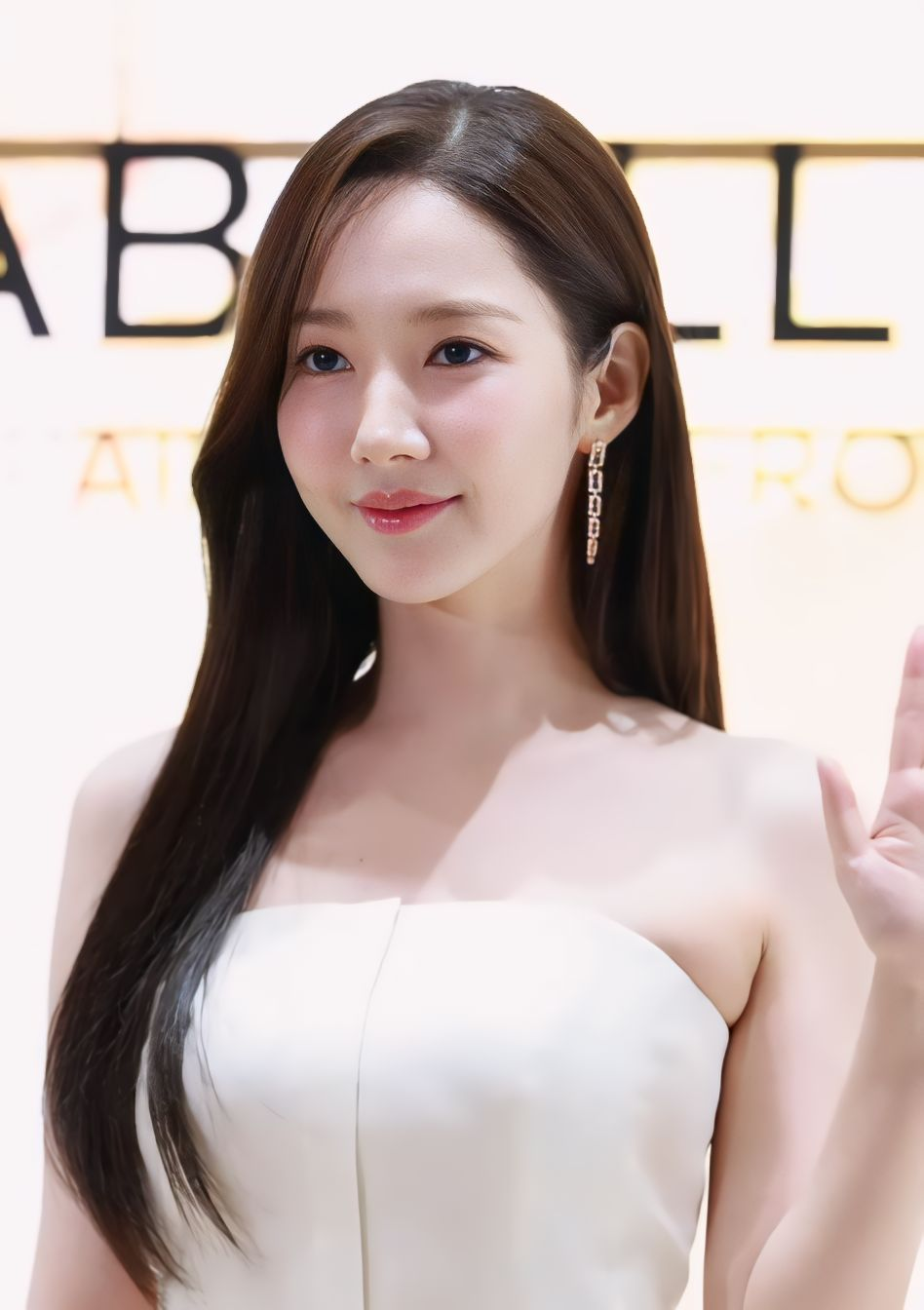
Park Min-young, winner of Best Actress of the Year Grand Prize (Daesang)

Winners are listed and emphasized in bold.

Grand Prize (Daesang)
**Artist of the Year – Actor: Kim Soo-hyun**; **Best Actress of the Year: Park Min-young**; **Best Actor of the Year: Byeon Woo-seok**; **Artist of the Year – Singer: NewJeans**; **Album of the Year: Day6 – Fourever**; **Song of the Year: Rosé and Bruno Mars – "APT."**; **Stage of the Year: NCT 127**; **Performance of the Year: Le Sserafim**
Best Artist Award
Television / Film	Music
**Ahn Bo-hyun**; **Byeon Woo-seok**; **Joo Won**; **Kentaro Sakaguchi**; **Kim Hye-yoon**; **Kim Soo-hyun**; **Park Min-young**; **Ryu Jun-yeol**	**Aespa**; **Bibi**; **BUS (Because of you I shine)**; **Day6**; **Ive**; **Kiss of Life**; **Le Sserafim**; **NCT 127**; **NewJeans**; **Suho**; **TWS**; **WayV**; **Zerobaseone**
Rookie of the Year
Television / Film	Music
**Jang Da-ah**	**QWER**; **TWS**
Asia Celebrity
Television	Music
**Byeon Woo-seok**	**Jang Won-young**
Popularity Award
Television / Film	Music
**Byeon Woo-seok**; **Kim Hye-yoon**	**Lim Young-woong**; **NiziU**
Best Choice
Television / Film	Music
**Jo Yu-ri**	**Doyoung**; **Ten**
Fabulous Award	Best Emotive Award
**Kim Soo-hyun**	**Jo Yu-ri**; **Tony Yu**
Hot Trend Award	Best Icon Award
**Kim Soo-hyun**	**&Team**
New Wave Award	Potential Award
**Bibi**	**Choi Bo-min**; **NCT Wish**
Focus Award	Best Performance Award
**WHIB**	**NewJeans – "How Sweet"**
Best Actor Award	Scene Stealer Award
**Kim Hye-yoon**; **Suho**	**Kim Min**
Best K-pop Record Award	Best Musician Award
**Jungkook**; **Seventeen**; **Stray Kids**	**Bibi**; **Jimin**; **Kiss of Life**; **Zerobaseone**
Best Producer Award	Best Creator Award
**Bumzu (Pledis Entertainment)**	**Seo Hyun-joo (Starship Entertainment)**
Best Band Award	Best Couple Award
**Day6**	**Byeon Woo-seok**; **Kim Hye-yoon**
Best Asian Star Award	Best OST Award
**Kentaro Sakaguchi**	**Byeon Woo-seok – "Sudden Shower" (Lovely Runner)**
Best Music Video Award	Queen of AAA
**Le Sserafim**	**Jang Won-young**
Thai Star Award
**Nattawat Jirochtikul**; **Norawit Titicharoenrak**
