= Lee Ungno Museum =

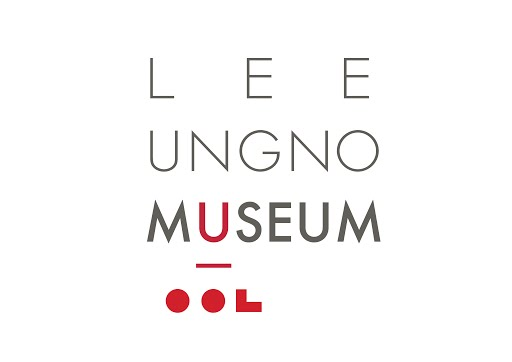

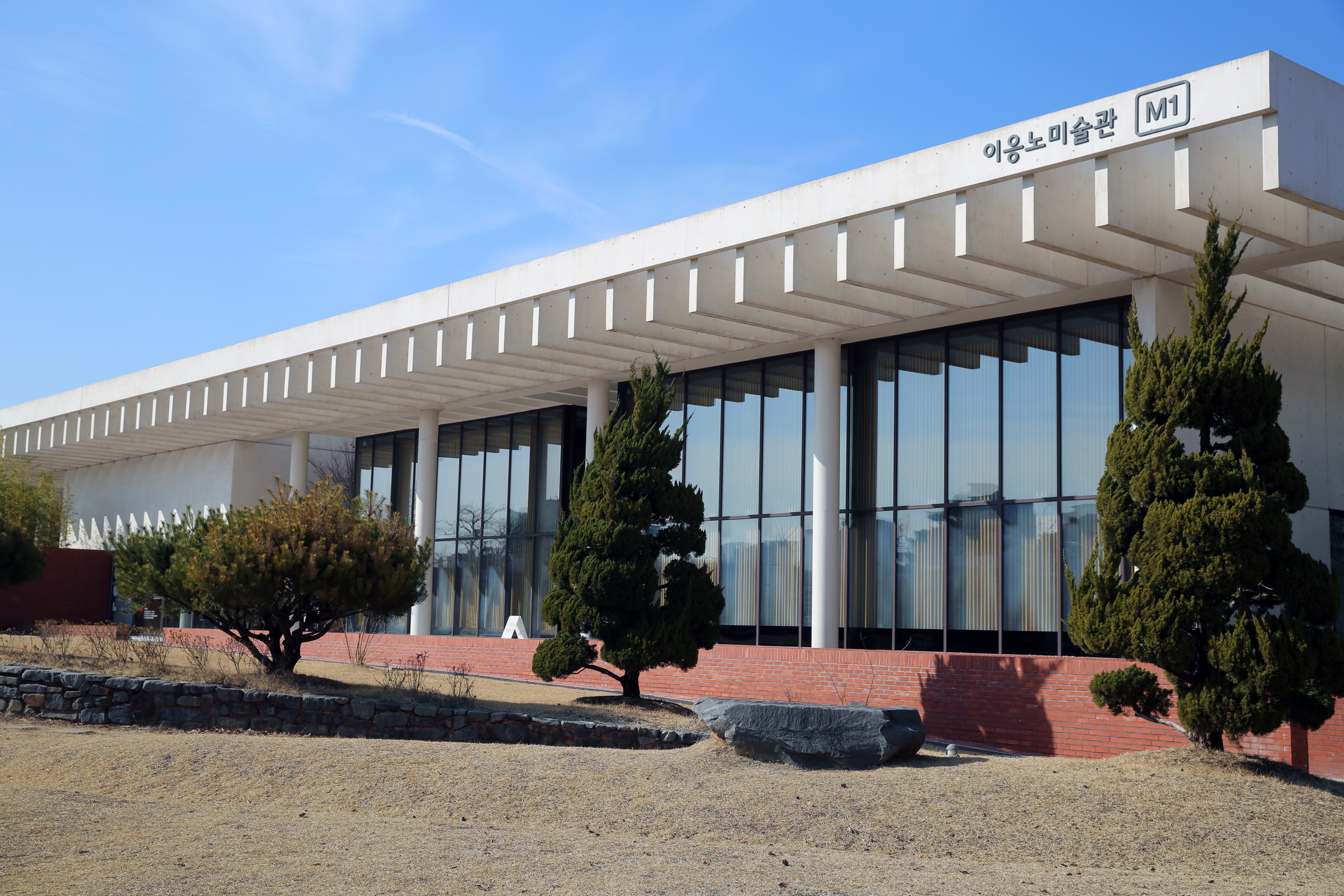
- Location: Daejeon, South Korea
- Coordinates: 36.366894°N 127.387047°E
- Type: Art museum
- Website: www.leeungnomuseum.or.kr

The Lee Ungno Museum (Korean: 이응노미술관) is an art museum in Daejeon, South Korea focusing on Korean-born French painter and printmaker Lee Ungno.

== History ==
The museum was inaugurated in 2007. The museum's designers won the Award of Excellence at the 2007 Korean Architecture Awards, and also won the Korea Architects Association Award for the unique design of the building. The museum building was designed by French architect Laurent Beaudouin. In 2012, Seo Seung-wan donated a painting by Lee Ungno to the museum, this painting is called "Seven Longevity 8-panel Screen". In April 2013, Park In-kyeong did about two sessions on Oriental painting at the museum. Since 2020, the museum has been part of the Google Arts & Culture platform. In June 2021, the museum organized a virtual exhibition called "Text, Patterns: Lee Un-no's Text Abstract". In 2021, the museum launched the Ungno Lee education program for the 2021 summer vacation.

== Collections ==
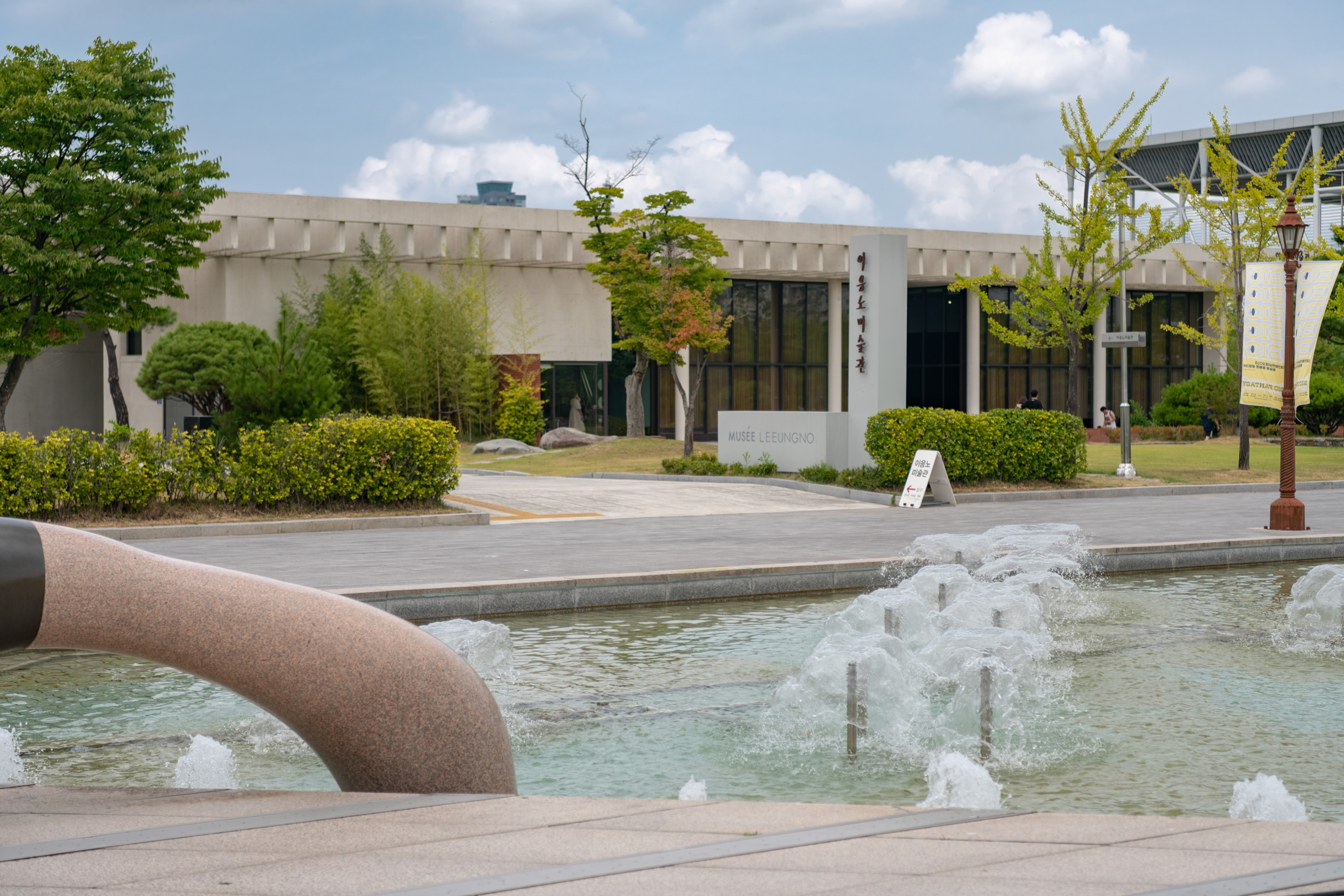
Lee Ungno Museum

The museum contains 1,366 works of art. In one of the museum's exhibits called ArtLab, works by Kim Deok-Han were displayed. The museum has also made exhibitions on sculptures dating from the 1960s and 1980s. In July 2014, the museum presented an exhibition featuring 119 works that won in the first Ungno Lee art contest, where around 700 students from elementary schools around South Korea participated. In October 2014, the museum presented an exhibition with works by Hans Hartung, Pierre Soulages and Zao Wou-Ki. In 2015, the museum launched an exhibition in collaboration with KAIST School of Culture and Technology and the museum technology company Tango Mic, called "Ungno Lee, a gesture of peace". In 2018, the museum launched an exhibition called "The Epic of Abstraction" with artworks dating from the 1950s to the 1980s. In October 2021, an exhibition called "Beyond the window of my room" was presented at the museum, featuring Park In-kyung's artwork. The museum's fifth ArtLab competition featured artworks by Korean artists Cheon Chan-mi, Kim Jeong-in, Koh Dong-hwan, Kim Jae-kyung, Kang Cheol-gyu, Kim Ja-hye and Kang Cheol-gyu. In 2021, an exhibition called "Finding Solidarity" was held at the museum, which featured artworks by Joo-Young Oh, Woo-Joo and Hee-Kyung Lim.
