= Suh Se-ok =

South Korean artist (1929–2020)

Suh Se-ok (Korean: 서세옥; Hanja: 徐世鈺; 1929 – 29 November 2020) artist known for his nonfigurative Oriental ink paintings. He is also known by the names Sanjeong (산정, 山丁) and Seo Se-ok.

He incorporated the use of spots and intense inkwash techniques to shape the field of contemporary Korean abstract ink paintings.서세옥 2014 기증작품 100, 5. In the 1960s, he formed an artist group ‘Ink Forest Group’ (Mungnimhoe, 묵림회, 墨林會, 1959–1964) with fellow Seoul National University (서울대학교) art school graduates including Park Se-won (박세원, 朴世元, 1922–1999), Chang Un-sang (장운상, 張雲祥, 1926–1982), and Chun Young-wha (전영화, 全榮華, 1929-), and led the reinvention of ink paintings through modern abstraction in South Korea. From the 1970s, he focused on his ‘People’ series, in which he depicted crowds of stick figures with simple brushstrokes and effectively expressed movement and creative use of composition. He is known for his usage of traditional Eastern materials, dynamic inkwash techniques, the utilisation of negative space, and simple yet effective brushstrokes.

His eldest son, Do Ho Suh, is also a renowned contemporary Korean installation artist based in London. His younger son, Eul Ho Suh, is a well established architect, founder of SUH Architects.

== Early life and education ==
Suh Se-ok was born in 1929 in Daegu (대구, 大邱), Korea.

Growing up, Suh Seo-ok was told that he had a talent for literature and even prepared for his literary debut. However, he chose to pursue an education in art when he found that there is no freedom in literature as it is completely dependent on letters, which are mere signs of language.

Suh first learned to sketch still life of plaster sculptures from artist Gil Jin-seop (길진섭, 吉鎭燮, 1907–1975) and later enrolled to Seoul National University after the establishment of the College of Fine Arts in 1946.

Suh Se-ok graduated from Seoul National University Art School where he majored in Eastern Painting and trained to paint ‘new literati painting’ focused on simple, uncluttered use of space, and damchae (담채, thin applications of light colour ink) ink techniques under painter and art critic Geunwon Kim Yong-jun (근원 김용준, 近園 金瑢俊, 1904–1967). This was a step away from Japanese styles of using cobweb-like outlines using thick colours and ink (jinchae, 진채).

Following his graduation, he played a leading role in founding the Mukrimhoe (or Mungnimhoe, “Ink Forest Society”) in 1960, a collective of Korean painters primarily composed of alumni from Seoul National University’s Department of Oriental Painting. The group’s name was inspired by the sobriquet Mukrim (or Molin) of Xiang Yuanbian, a prominent art collector of China’s Ming dynasty. Amid the rise of abstract art in the 1960s Korean art scene, the collective sought to reinvigorate traditional ink painting by aligning it with modern abstraction. Members of the Mukrimhoe are often credited with advancing the genre of modern Korean painting known as Sumukchusang (“Abstract Ink Painting” or “Ink Abstraction”). This genre, which originated in the 1960s, sought to explore abstract forms through brushstroke-based techniques and to investigate the relationship between East Asian calligraphy and Western modern art.

While in university, he won first place in the first annual Korean-government-hosted art exhibition, Daehan Minguk Misul Jeollamhoe (대한민국미술전람회, 大韓民國美術展覽會, National Art Exhibition, also known as Gukjeon, 국전, 國展) in 1949 with his work Flower Seller (꽃장수, 1949). After graduating, he further trained in ink painting under Woljeon (월전, 月田) Jang U-seong (장우성, 張遇聖, 1912–2005). In addition to being a calligrapher, Suh was also a talented Hansi (한시, 漢詩, Chinese poetry) poet and an accomplished seal designer and engraver.

== Career ==
After liberation from Japanese occupation in 1945 and the Korean War (1948-1950), Suh aimed to “purge from Korean art the compositional strategies and color schemes used in nihonga,” (J. 日本画) or Japanese coloured ink painting that was dominant in the field of Eastern painting during Japanese occupation. His attempts to create a modern, distinctively Korean style of ink painting was a shared goal of many contemporary artists of the time- with fellow graduates of Seoul National University, Seo Se-ok formed Mukrimhoe in 1959, an artist group of Eastern-style painters who experimented with the traditional medium of ink and styles of avant-garde and abstraction. Although the group was exploring American and European post-war artistic movements such as Art Informel, Suh argued that the continued Korean appropriation of Western avant-gardes could lead to a loss of the understanding of Korean art and even art itself.

An accomplished calligraphist, Suh began incorporating calligraphy techniques into his paintings in the 1950s. Suh Se-ok went on to become an artist pursuing modernistic works using subdued, pale Indian ink, handmade mulberry paper or rice paper, lyrical brushstrokes, and negative space of Eastern ink-and-wash painting.

Suh Se-ok held various overseas exhibitions, including the 7th São Paulo Biennale in 1963, the exhibition of Korean Arts in Malaysia in 1966, The 1st Modern Painting Biennale in Italy in 1969, Exhibition of Korean Arts in France in 1967 and the 1st Cannes Painting Festival in 1969. He also participated in the regular general assembly of the IAA held in Tokyo, Japan in 1966 as the Korean representative and travelled throughout the arts circles of the North America and Europe.

His representative works include Seolhwayijang: People Handling the Sun (설화이장, 說話二章: 태양을 다투는 사람들, 1969), Long Life (장생, 1972), ‘행인’(1978), and Dancing People (춤추는 사람들, 1989). The figurative or abstract human forms in his paintings are made up of his characteristic brushstrokes of varying thickness, tones and lengths, painted in ink on mulberry paper.

Suh Se-ok also worked as an educator and taught painting at Seoul National University from 1955 and served as Dean of College of Fine Arts from 1982 to 1985. He was also a judge at Gukjeon from 1961 to 1982.

== Artworks and style ==
Although Suh Se-ok's abstract ink paintings are often translated as a marriage between Western abstract composition and traditional materials and techniques, his practice is closely tied to the traditional literati painting practice of jikgwan (직관, 直觀, intuition) and introspective applications of lines and dots. Moreover, his works are recognized to be transcendent of the distinctions of Western and Oriental, and of figurative or abstract.

His skills and application of the tradition of brush painting and calligraphic practices can be seen in Epitaph (1962), where he ‘wrote’ thoughtfully laid out dots onto an epitaph instead of letters. 사람들 서세옥 Although they are dots without meaning, the viewers may observe the dots as if they can be ‘read.’

His famous 'People' series that developed from Suh's reformation of the pictographic Chinese character ‘in’ (인, 人, person) also hints inspiration from calligraphic painting.

The collective and repetitive composition of dots for the head and lines for limbs results in a harmonious pattern or wave of people in a crowd, but also looks like repetitive abstraction of dots and lines. Moreover, the wholistic ‘crowd’ seems uniform and connected, yet the depiction of each ‘person’ is also unique in their movements and form. Yet he does not present a portrait of particular figures but hints to the universality of life, human beings, and human movement. In this sense, Suh Se-ok's ‘People’ series displays a compelling and immersive marriage between abstraction and figurative depiction, as 'intertwined formations oscillate between representation and sheer mark-making.”

Suh Se-ok produced a series of highly figurative works with mythological themes in the 60s and 70s, but even these paintings display highly compressed and restrained compositions and minimal brushstrokes.

Suh Se-ok used many different types of ink brushstrokes in his paintings, most noticeably ‘balmuk,’ (발묵, 潑墨) the free, spontaneous spraying and pouring of ink, and ‘seokmuk’ (석묵, 惜墨), a restrained use of ink.

Over the course of his career, Suh’s paintings gradually showcased less stylistic technique and became minimal and almost improvisational. In this sense, the use of negative space became stronger toward his later years. According to Suh, “What is there and is not there and are in a constant cycle,” borrowing from the saying “form is void and void is form” (색즉시공 공즉시색(色卽是空 空卽是色) from the Heart Sutra.

Suh's exploration of form and void found expression in his free-flowing use of ink and white paper, a skilful play on presence and absence that not only evidenced his understanding of Eastern painting's quintessential nature, but also his technical skill in creating work that engaged with Korean painting's 'identity' - a concept that emerged following Japan's colonial rule of Suh's homeland from 1910–1945.

== Awards ==
- The Prime Minister Prize at the 1st National Art Exhibition, Korea (1949)
- Minister of Culture and Education Prize at the 3rd Gukjeon Exhibition (Daehan Minguk misul jeollamhoe, 1954)
- Director of the National Academy of Arts Prize, Best Artist Prize at the 19th Gukjeon Exhibition (1970)
- Ilmin Art Prize, Seoul, Korea (1994)
- The Artistic and Culture Prize of 13th Federation of Artistic and Culture, Korea (1999)
- The Artist of the Year, National Museum of Contemporary Art (2005)
- 52nd National Academy of Arts Award, Korea (2007)

== See also ==
- Do-ho Suh
