= Cha Eun-woo =

South Korean singer and actor (born 1997)

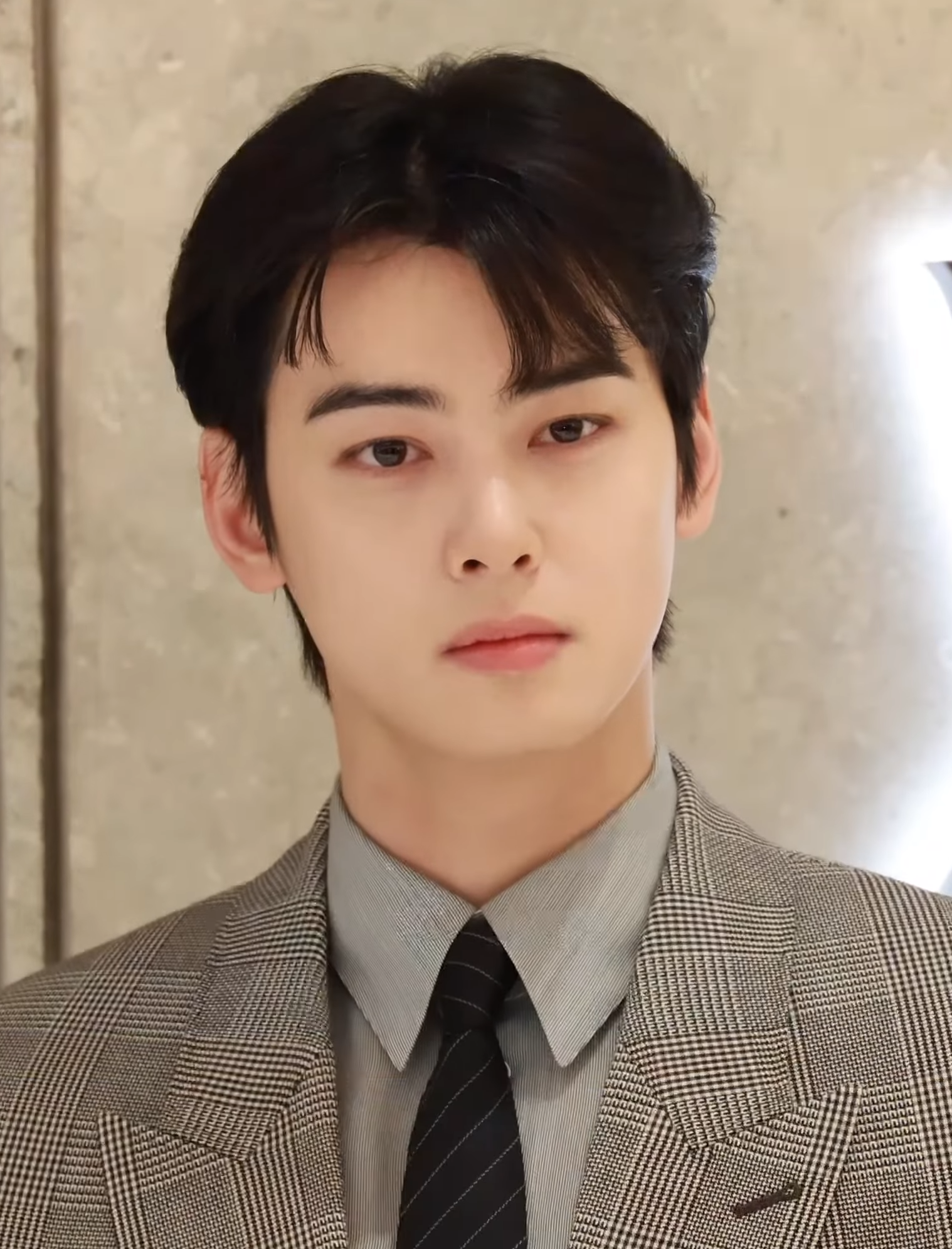
- Cha in 2025
- Born: Lee Dong-min; March 30, 1997 (age 29); Gunpo, South Korea
- Education: Sungkyunkwan University (Performing arts)
- Occupations: Singer; actor
- Years active: 2014–present
- Musical career
- Genres: K-pop; R&B
- Instrument: Vocals
- Label: Fantagio
- Member of: Astro
- Website: Official website

Korean name
- Hangul: 이동민
- RR: I Dongmin
- MR: I Tongmin

Stage name
- Hangul: 차은우
- RR: Cha Eunu
- MR: Ch'a Ŭnu

Signature
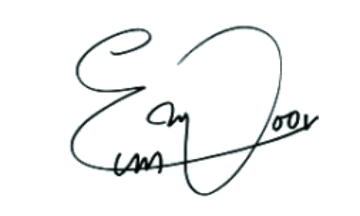

Lee Dong-min (Korean: 이동민; born March 30, 1997), known professionally as Cha Eun-woo (Korean: 차은우, Korean pronunciation: [t͡ɕʰa ɯn u]), is a South Korean singer and actor. He is a member of the South Korean boy band Astro, and debuted as a solo artist with the extended play (EP) Entity in 2024. Cha made his acting debut in the film My Brilliant Life (2014) and gained widespread recognition through his lead roles in television series such as Gangnam Beauty (2018), Rookie Historian Goo Hae-ryung (2019), and True Beauty (2020–2021), the latter contributing to his international recognition as a figure of the Korean Wave. He has since starred in Island (2022–2023), A Good Day to Be a Dog (2023–2024), and Wonderful World (2024), and the film The First Ride (2025). He has received several accolades throughout his career and has been included in various notable lists, including Forbes Korea Power Celebrity, Forbes 30 Under 30, and Gallup Korea's actor rankings.

== Early life and education ==
Cha Eun-woo was born Lee Dong-min on March 30, 1997, in Gunpo, South Korea. He has a younger brother, Lee Dong-hwi.

During his childhood, Cha aspired to become a doctor, prosecutor, or police officer. He spent six months in Tagaytay, Philippines, during his elementary school years, where he studied English.

Cha attended Nungnae Elementary School, Suri Middle School, and Suri High School. During middle school, he ranked third among all students at his school. He also served as student council president and captained the soccer and basketball teams. His school records additionally listed achievements in English and debate competitions, essay writing, and robot programming.

In November 2015, he was accepted into Sungkyunkwan University through early admission to its acting department. He graduated from Hanlim Multi Art School in February 2016, specializing in broadcasting and entertainment within the acting department. He later graduated from Sungkyunkwan University with a major in performing arts in the theater department.

== Career ==
=== 2013–2015: Career beginnings and acting debut ===
Cha was discovered by a talent scout at a school festival and signed with Fantagio during his first year of high school to pursue acting. He was also offered a place in the company's idol trainee program, where he began training alongside his acting activities. His stage name, "Cha Eun-woo", was given by his agency and consists of the hanja characters Eun (銀), meaning "silver", and Woo (優), meaning "excellence", and was intended to convey the meaning of "always shining everywhere and becoming an excellent person".

In 2014, while still a trainee under his real name Lee Dong-min, he appeared in a KBS news report on the K-pop training system. That same year, he made his acting debut with a minor role in the film My Brilliant Life, starring Gang Dong-won and Song Hye-kyo, portraying the healthy teenage version of the protagonists' son. The appearance generated significant public interest, leading to the creation of an online fan cafe and his selection as the brand model for the Korean cosmetics Shara Shara.

Cha was the fourth trainee to be officially introduced through Fantagio's "Fantagio i-Teen Photo Test Cut". In August 2015, he was cast in his first leading role in the web drama To Be Continued, alongside Kim Sae-ron. In the series, he portrayed a fictionalized version of himself, characterized by his piano-playing and musical composition skills.

=== 2016–2022: Debut with Astro, solo activities and rising popularity ===
In 2016, Cha appeared on the KBS1 quiz show Challenge Golden Bell and revealed that he was preparing to debut with Astro. He featured in the SBS special television program Find Me, in one of the "Truman" roles. He debuted in Astro on February 23, with the EP Spring Up. In May, Cha was announced as one of the cast members of SBS reality-documentary show Law of the Jungle in New Caledonia. In August, Cha participated in the Chuseok special variety show Replies That Make Us Flutter alongside Dahyun, where the two played fictionized versions of themselves in a high school romantic comedy. In September, he participated in another Chuseok pilot program, Boomshakalaka. Cha was announced as a host of Show! Music Core alongside Kim Sae-ron, Lee Soo-min and Xiyeon from 2016 to 2018. In 2016, he also starred in the web drama My Romantic Some Recipe.

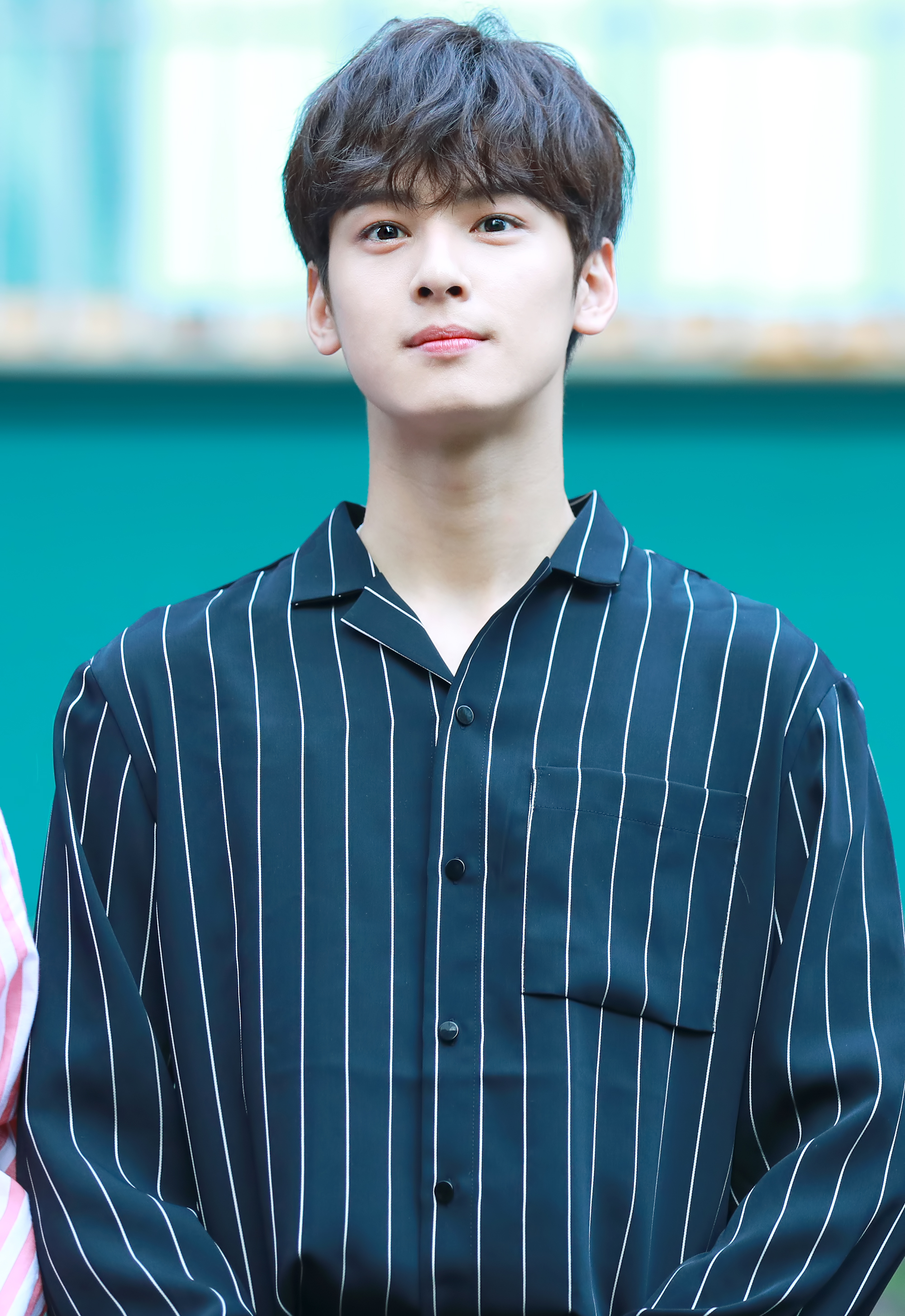
Cha in 2017

In 2017, Cha was cast in the KBS2 drama Hit the Top and starred in the web drama Sweet Revenge. Cha was announced as a host of MBC Gayo Daejejeon from 2017 to 2019. In 2018, Cha starred in the YouTube Original show Top Management, playing the role of a young man who aspired to be an idol. The show was a first for the streaming service, which at the time had never offered a "YouTube K-drama series". He was later cast in the JTBC romantic comedy series Gangnam Beauty, his first leading role on television. Following the series, Cha was named one of GQ Korea's "Men of the Year" in 2018. In 2019, Cha starred in the historical drama Rookie Historian Goo Hae-ryung alongside Shin Se-kyung. He played the role of a royal prince who became a romance novelist, and won the Excellence Award for an Actor and Best Couple Award with Shin at the MBC Drama Awards. In December, he was announced as a cast member of the new variety show Handsome Tigers alongside Joy, Lee Sang-yoon, Yoo Seon-ho, and Seo Jang-hoon.

In April 2020, Cha joined SBS television show Master in the House as a fixed cast member. In October 2020, Cha made his runway debut at Seoul Fashion Week for Ji Chun-hee's Miss Gee collection. At the 2020 SBS Entertainment Awards, he won the Rookie Award for his role on the show. In December 2020, he starred in the tvN coming-of-age romance drama True Beauty based on the webtoon of the same name, playing a high school student alongside Moon Ga-young. In June 2021, he left Master in the House. In November 2021, Cha released "Don't Cry, My Love", a ballad song featuring a piano performance, for the official soundtrack of the comic Under The Oak Tree. In 2022, Cha recorded the remake of "Focus on Me" for the soundtrack of the Kakao Webtoon The Villainess Is a Marionette, released on February 22. He then played the role of a Navy officer in Hwang In-ho's urban terror action film Decibel which was released in November 2022. Later that year he starred in TVING drama Island alongside Kim Nam-gil, Lee Da-hee and Sung Joon, playing the role of an exorcist priest. On December 30, Fantagio released an official statement stating that Cha had decided to renew his contract with the agency.

=== 2023–present: Solo ventures and mainstream popularity ===
In 2023, Cha held his first solo photography exhibition, titled ARCHIVE, at The Seouliteum gallery in Seoul, which featured personal photographs. He also starred in the webtoon-based fantasy romance drama A Good Day to Be a Dog. For the series, he released the remake of the song "Jealousy", originally sung by Yoo Seung-beom, as part of the soundtrack. Cha became the first Asian artist to receive the VMAs Global Icon Award at the MTV Video Music Awards Japan 2023, a special award honoring achievements in global artistic activities.

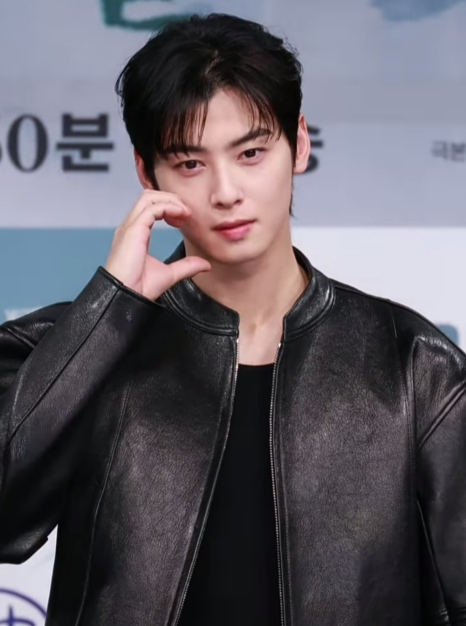
Cha in March 2024

In 2024, Cha embarked on the "Just One 10 Minutes "Mystery Elevator", his first solo fan concert. He performed all songs included in his album for the first time at the Seoul fan concert. On February 15, Cha's extended play Entity was released, containing the lead single "Stay". The music video featured him and American actress India Eisley. His Just One 10 Minutes fan concert began on February 17 in South Korea, including tours to Malaysia, Thailand, Philippines, Japan, Singapore, as well as Indonesia. On February 19, the music video of the EP, "Where Am I" was released. On March 27, it was announced that three more concerts were added in Hong Kong, Brazil and Mexico between April 26 and June 5. On April 25, due to demand, a second show was added in Mexico at Arena CDMX on June 4. On May 16, the encore fan concert was announced. It began in Japan at K-Arena Yokohama on June 29 and 30. Cha reunited with the audience in South Korea at SK Olympic Handball Gymnasium on July 6.

Cha co-starred in the revenge thriller series Wonderful World opposite actress Kim Nam-joo aired in 2024. In August 2024, Cha released the digital single "Hey Hello" in collaboration with Peder Elias. In December 2024, Cha featured in Lee Seung Gi's 20th debut anniversary album With, in the song "Because You're My Woman".

In the beginning of 2025, Cha starred as one of the cast members of tvN's variety show Rented in Finland along with Lee Je-hoon, Lee Dong-hwi, and Kwak Dong-yeon. In April 2025, Cha contributed to the tribute song for his Astro bandmate Moonbin to mark the second anniversary of his death. He personally contacted all those involved in the project. In May, Cha made a special appearance in IU's music video, "A Beautiful Person". On June 18, Cha released his first VR concert, Cha Eun-woo VR Concert: Memories, which premiered in 21 cities worldwide including Seoul, Los Angeles, Tokyo, Mexico City, Taipei, Beijing, Hong Kong, Hanoi, Singapore, and Jakarta. On June 21, it was announced that Cha is preparing to hold a solo fan meeting before his enlistment, "THE ROYAL", at Kyung Hee University Peace Hall in Seoul on July 12, followed by two shows in Japan at Ariake Arena on July 15. In July, Cha collaborated with Arden Cho on an acoustic cover of "Free", the theme song from the animated film KPop Demon Hunters. On August 4, the song was released on all music platforms. In September 2025, Cha Eun-woo: Memories in Cinemas was released at CGV theaters. The project is a film adaptation of the Cha Eun-woo VR Concert: Memories, presented in 2D, ScreenX, 4DX, and Ultra 4DX formats. It premiered in South Korea, with sequential releases in cities worldwide. He made his leading film debut with director Nam Dae-jung's film The First Ride released in October 2025. In November 2025, Cha released his second extended play (EP), Else.

In May 2026, Cha starred in the Netflix superhero comedy series The Wonderfools, in which he played a socially awkward civic servant from Seoul. From March 28 to May 12, he held a solo photo exhibition titled Cha Eun-woo Solo Exhibition: Afterimage at the Ginza Novo gallery in Tokyo, Japan.

== Other ventures ==
=== Endorsements and fashion ===
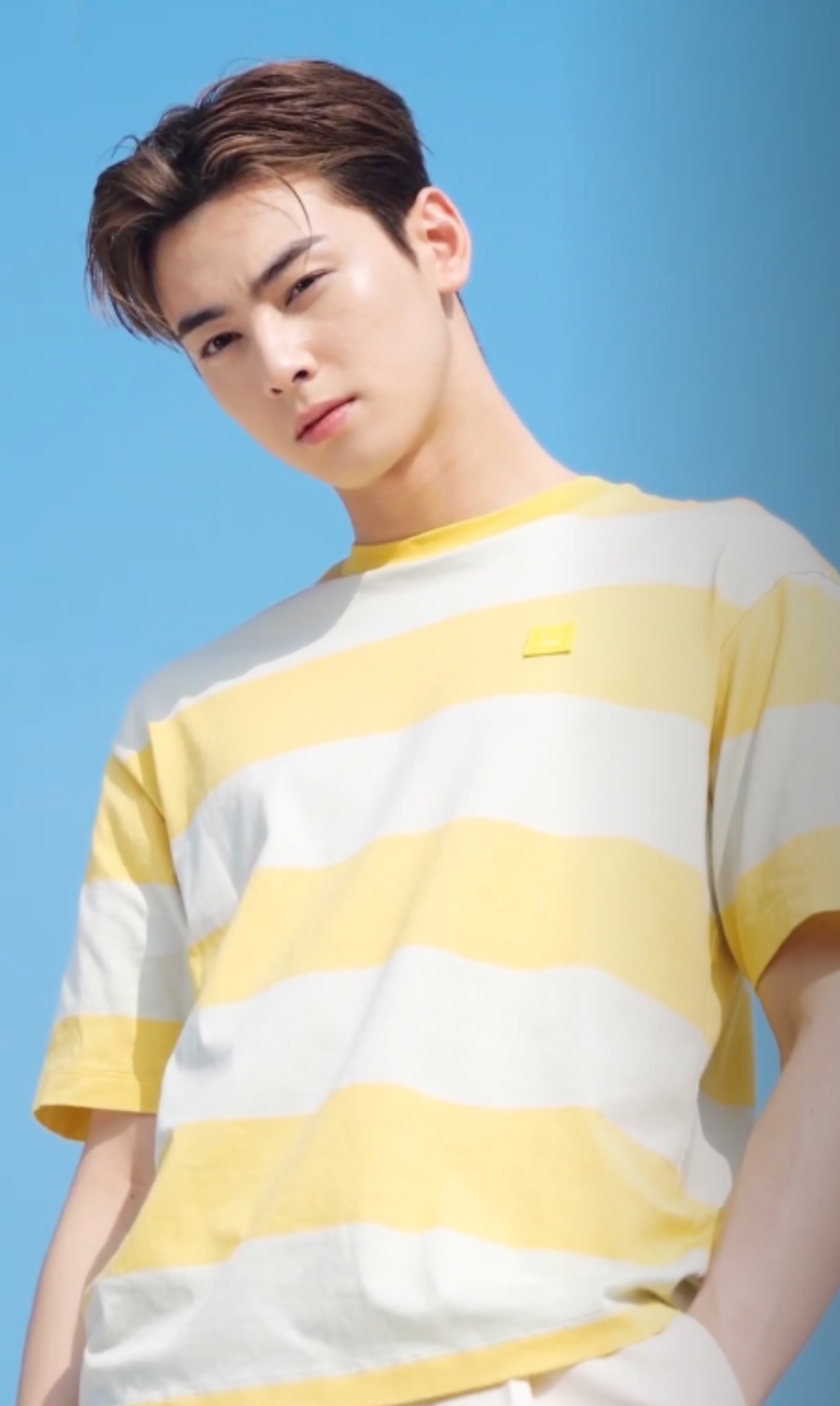
Cha for Marie Claire Korea in 2020

As the rookie actor Lee Dong-min, he was selected as model for Korean cosmetics brand Shara Shara in 2014. In January 2017, Cha was chosen as exclusive model for the shoe brand Bluemountain Korea. In February, Cha was chosen as advertising model for the French outdoor clothing brand Lafuma. In April, he was selected as promotional model for Clearteen, a dermatological line from the South Korean pharmaceutical company Handok. In May, Cha become an advertising model for the ice cream brand Baskin-Robbins. In June, Cha was chosen as promotional model for Lotte Water Park. In August, he was selected as a promotional model for POLHAM. In October, Cha was chosen as an advertising model for Nongshim pretzel.

In January 2018, Cha was selected as the model for Aritaum's Angel Kiss Tint, from the South Korean beauty and cosmetics brand Amorepacific. In July, Cha was chosen as new TV commercial model for "EyeBon", an eye care product line by Dong-A Pharmaceutical. In October, Cha was chosen as the first muse for the street fashion brand BMS (Be My Self). Additionally, Cha became the muse for Atelier Cologne, and was selected as advertising model for Kellogg's Hershey Choco Crunch cereal. In December, Cha became the advertising model for Goobne Chicken, and a brand ambassador for Italian luxury fashion house Armani's watches. In January 2019, Cha was selected as a promotional model for the American luggage brand Samsonite's Red line. In March, he was announced as the promotional model for LG Uplus' 5G, and became the muse for American footwear and sports brand K-Swiss. In June, Cha was appointed as a new promotional model for Samsung Card. In August, Cha was selected as an advertising model for beauty brand Liz K. In October, he became the new face of beauty device company Unix Electronics.

In January 2020, Cha became a brand ambassador for South Korean cosmeceutical brand BRTC (Bio Remedies Therapeutic Cosmetics) in China. In February, Cha was appointed an official model for Australian/New Zealand multinational brand sportswear brand 2XU. In December, he was named the global face of Filipino beauty and health brand Frontrow. In January 2021, Cha was chosen as advertising model for Dong-A Pharmaceutical's derma cosmetics brand, Fation. In February, Cha became Penshoppe's international ambassador. In March, he was selected as the brand model for Noona Holdak Chicken. In May, Cha was chosen as a new model for clothing brand O'Neill. In July, Cha became a global brand ambassador for the British luxury fashion house Burberry, was chosen as the first Konvy's presenter, as well as advertising model for Mackiss Company's Now We Are soju, and for Nunen Chazuki under the Korean premium eye health brand '2.0 Recipe'. In August, Cha was selected as advertising model for Samhwa Foods, and the new muse of Dashu Perfume. In January 2022, Cha became the muse for the hair styling brand Dashu. The next two months, he became new brand ambassador for Ms Glow and Mister Potato. In April 2022, Cha was selected as a model for contemporary men's clothing brand Liberclassy. In June, Cha became a brand ambassador for Dior Beauty, announced after attending Jean-Michel Othoniel's exhibition. In December, Cha was officially announced as a brand ambassador for Dior.

In January 2023, Cha became a regional brand ambassador for the American multinational footwear and apparel brand Skechers. In February, Cha and actress Han So-hee were selected as CF models together for global clothing brand Giordano. Cha launches the global campaign 2023 New Liens collection Liens Evidence. In March, Cha became a brand ambassador for Est Cola. Cha became a brand ambassador for Dunkin' Philippines. In June, Cha also became a brand ambassador for Skechers in Indonesia, and was selected as a brand ambassador for Subway. In August, Cha has been selected as promotional model for Chung Jungwon Home:ings. Cha has been selected as the new brand ambassador for outdoor brand The North Face. In October, Cha has been selected as the new brand ambassador for Ricola. Cha is also announced as the face of the insurance company Hanwha Life.

In January 2024, Cha became a brand ambassador for Cornetto in Southeast Asia. In February, Cha has been selected as the new brand ambassador for Milo Thailand. In March, Cha has been selected as advertising model for Sprite. In August, Cha has been selected as the new brand ambassador for Nescafé in Hong Kong and Macau. Cha was also announced as the new brand ambassador for Healthcare robot company Bodyfriend. In September, Cha was selected as the new face of the global campaign for Calvin Klein's Fall 2024 menswear collections, including the Calvin Klein Studio line. He has also been announced as the advertising model for LG Uplus' AX. Cha became the global ambassador for the French luxury jewellery and watch house Chaumet, and was chosen as an global ambassador for the French luxury fashion house Saint Laurent. In October, Cha became a brand ambassador for the American fashion brand Calvin Klein. He has been selected as the exclusive advertising model for Norang Tongdak chicken. In November, Digital Daesung's MiMac Study e-learning brand appoints Cha as its new promotional model.

In February 2025, Cha was chosen as the new advertising model for Shinhan Financial Group's Shinhan Bank. In March, Cha became a brand ambassador for international clothing brand Marithé et François Girbaud. On August 29, he was appointed as the global brand ambassador for the Korean cosmetics brand Abib.

=== Philanthropy ===
Since 2016, Cha has engaged in significant philanthropic activities spanning education, disaster relief, health awareness, children's welfare, and international causes.

His early contributions included donating his handwriting to the Korean language learning app Danbi in October 2016, with all profits supporting the Korea Foundation for International Cultural Exchange's Hangul ODA (Official Development Assistance) project. Two years later, in June 2018, he participated in the Ice Bucket Challenge to raise awareness and funds for South Korea's first ALS nursing hospital, a challenge he revisited in July 2023 with an additional ₩10 million donation.

In 2019, he donated ₩10 million to aid victims of the Sokcho Fire and contributed another ₩10 million (jointly with Unix Electronics Chairman Lee Chung-goo) to the "Junior Love Academic Support Fund" for scholarships at his alma mater, Sungkyunkwan University, a project he has continued to support by donating earnings from his advertising contracts.

In 2020, he collaborated with G-Market Global Shop's "Give Love" campaign to benefit Save the Children Korea's "School Me" project and made a separate ₩30 million donation to assist communities affected by the COVID-19 pandemic in South Korea.

In 2022, he served as a special audio guide for the British contemporary art exhibition by Michael Craig-Martin, donating a portion of the proceeds to support pediatric cancer patients at the National Cancer Center, and later held his personal photo exhibition Archive, donating all profits to help the underprivileged.

More recently, Cha has expanded his charitable efforts both internationally and domestically. In 2023, he supported the "Little Miracle" project in Thailand, raising ฿400,000 through an auction in April and an additional ฿514,902 in May for the Children's Hospital Foundation through KonnecThai. In October 2024, he participated in W Korea's "Love Your W" breast cancer awareness campaign and charity event, and donated personal items to the "WeAJa Sharing Market" to benefit underprivileged youth and groups affected by the climate crisis. In March 2025, he donated ₩100 million through the Korean Red Cross for wildfire recovery efforts in the Ulsan, Gyeongbuk, and Gyeongnam regions.

== Public image ==
Since his acting debut in the film My Brilliant Life (2014), Lee Dong-min gained early media attention for his visual appeal. Korean media calling him a "man-jjit-nam" ("a man who stepped out of a comic book") and described him as "more beautiful than a woman", praising his fair complexion. In a year-end article, Hankook Ilbo included him among the stars who shined in the cosmetics industry, noting that his professional attitude and impact far exceeded the standards for a rookie. This reputation evolved into the moniker "Face Genius", with his persona often described as providing "comfort and inspiration". South Korean poet Jang Jae-seon included him as one of 37 cultural icons in the collection The Comfort of the Stars (2024), while Brazilian writer Rose Costa published the book Thank You, Cha Eun-woo (2022) to highlight his professionalism and talent.

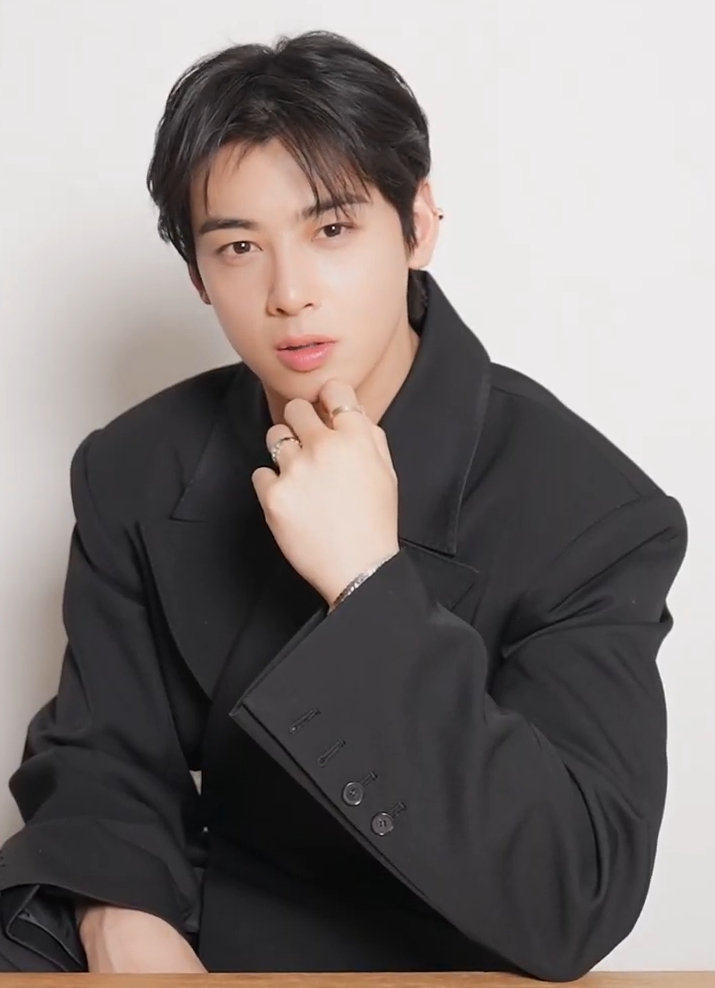
Cha in March 2025

Cha's commercial and digital influence has consistently ranked among the highest in the industry. Named GQ Korea's Man of the Year in 2018, he was later recognized as the male "Hot Instagrammer" by K-pop Radar (2019) and became the only Korean male celebrity after members of BTS and Blackpink to surpass 40 million Instagram followers by 2024. His commercial impact was evidenced in 2022, when his partnership with Liberclassy resulted in an 806% increase in mall traffic and over 70 million won in sales for pre-application alone. In 2024, Cha was noted as the male celebrity with the highest number of television advertising appearances in South Korea, representing 13 different brands. Following this commercial dominance, Forbes Korea named him the "CF Genius" in August 2025, highlighting his status as a preferred choice for advertisers due to his widespread public appeal.

His professional standing and cultural influence are further validated by recurring placements on power lists and official state recognition. He has frequently appeared on the Forbes Korea Power Celebrity 40 list, reaching 11th place in 2024 as the highest-ranked actor. In Gallup Korea's 2024 longitudinal study covering two decades (2004–2024), Cha was ranked third as the "Gallup Korea's Favorite Actor"—the youngest in the top 10—and led as the primary choice for teenagers. In 2025, the Ministry of Culture, Sports and Tourism identified him as one of the top 10 "Hallyu Star Actors" associated with the national image. Globally, his leadership has been acknowledged through his inclusion in the Forbes 30 Under 30 Korea (2023) and Asia (2025) lists, the 2025 Madame Tussauds "Hot 100", and his selection as the first male cover star for Harper's Bazaar Hong Kong. He was also recognized in Teen Vogue's "New Hollywood Class of 2025" and as a "Most Inspiring Person" by Elle Thailand in 2024.

== State and honorary roles ==
Cha has held various honorary and official positions appointed by Government of South Korea-affiliated organizations. These roles focus on cultural diplomacy, international trade, and national tourism promotion, distinct from his state and cultural awards.

List of state and honorary roles held by Cha Eun-woo
Year	Title / Role	Organization	Ref.
2019	K-Food Promotional Model	aT (Korea Agro-Fisheries & Food Trade Corporation)	
2020	Seoul Tourism Promotional Model	Seoul Metropolitan Government & Seoul Tourism Organization	
2023–2024	Honorary Ambassador for Visit Korea Year	Korea Tourism Organization	
2025	Master of Ceremonies (Welcome Dinner)	Asia-Pacific Economic Cooperation (APEC)	

== Personal life ==
=== Wealth ===
In 2021, Cha purchased a penthouse in Cheongdam-dong worth ₩4.9 billion. His total net worth is estimated at US$50 million as of 2023.

=== Military service ===
Cha applied to join the Republic of Korea Army Band in May 2025. His acceptance was confirmed later that month, and he began his mandatory military service on July 28, 2025, for a term of 18 months, with his discharge expected in January 2027.

He completed basic training at the Korea Army Training Center in Nonsan, where he was selected as a company commander trainee in August 2025 and graduated the following month as the representative of his training company. Following basic training, he was assigned as a vocalist to the Fanfare Unit of the military band attached to the South Korean Ministry of National Defense (MND).

In October 2025, he hosted the welcome dinner for the Asia-Pacific Economic Cooperation (APEC) summit in Gyeongju. The following month, he performed at a Korean Armed Forces Band touring concert. In December, he joined the Korean Force Network (KFN) series The Day's Military Story as a storyteller, narrating stories about military history.

In 2026, he continued to participate in military band performances, including a rendition of g.o.d's "One Candle", the MND Band Battalion's annual concert, HERITAGE: The Patriotic Resonance, and a commemorative concert marking the relocation of the Ministry of National Defense building. At the latter event, he performed Cho Yong-pil's "Let's Go on a Trip" in front of Defense Minister Ahn Gyu-baek while holding the rank of sergeant.

=== Tax dispute ===
In January 2026, South Korean media outlets reported that National Tax Service (NTS) issued an initial notice of additional tax assessment to Cha in the range of ₩20 billion (US$14.92 million). According to the NTS, a corporation established by Cha's mother was used to route part of his income from Fantagio through a management service contract, resulting in income being taxed at corporate rather than personal income tax rates. Cha's representatives denied that the company was a paper company, stating that it was registered as a popular culture and arts planning business. They explained that his mother established it to manage his activities following repeated changes in Fantagio's leadership and that a pre-assessment review had been requested to challenge the tax assessment.

On January 30, Edaily corrected misunderstandings and speculations, clarifying that Cha was not subject to criminal tax penalties, as the case was not classified as tax evasion. The matter is under a pre-assessment review, an administrative process that is not used in criminal tax cases. Attorney Kim Chae-eun of the law firm Sedam similarly stated that describing the case as tax evasion was inappropriate in the absence of criminal charges or penalties for fraudulent underreporting. She also expressed concern that some media coverage had stigmatized the exercise of taxpayer rights.

On April 8, after receiving the official tax notification of approximately ₩20 billion (US$14.92 million), Cha paid the full assessed amount. However, after offsets and refunds for previously paid corporate taxes and value-added tax (VAT) on the same earnings, the net amount was approximately ₩13 billion (US$9.7 million). He issued a personal statement via Instagram the same day, taking responsibility for issues related to the establishment and management of the company, and stating that he would apply stricter standards to his future activities. Fantagio issued an apology, stating that it acknowledged insufficient review and management of the matter and would strengthen internal verification procedures to prevent similar cases.

On November 1, reports emerged that Cha had previously terminated his exclusive contract with Fantagio by mutual agreement due to the agency's management control disputes and operational void, before later re-establishing his contractual relationship with the agency. In July 2019, Fantagio entered into an outsourcing agreement with a company established by Cha's mother to provide support for his entertainment activities, which remains in effect as of November 2026. Fantagio stated that the agreement was based on actual services provided and that no issues had been raised during the April 2024 tax audit, but differences in tax law interpretation with the NTS arose during the 2025 audit regarding the transactions and tax invoices.

== Discography ==
=== Extended plays ===
List of extended plays, with selected chart positions and sales
Title	Details	Peak chart positions		Sales
Title	Details	KOR	JPN	Sales
Entity	Released: February 15, 2024; Label: Fantagio Music; Formats: CD, digital download, streaming	2	15	KOR: 217,295; JPN: 4,450
Else	Released: November 21, 2025; Label: Fantagio Music; Formats: CD, digital download, streaming	8	47	KOR: 99,346; JPN: 980

=== Singles ===
==== As lead artist ====
List of singles, showing year released, selected chart positions, and name of the album
Title	Year	Peak chart positions	Album
Title	Year	KOR DL	Album
"First Love"	2022	66	Drive to the Starry Road
"Stay"	2024	7	Entity
"Saturday Preacher"	2025	95	Else
"—" denotes a recording that did not chart or was not released in that territory

==== Collaborations ====
List of collaborations, showing year released, selected chart positions, and name of the album
Title	Year	Peak chart positions	Album
Title	Year	KOR DL	Album
"Hey Hello" (with Peder Elias)	2024	73	Non-album single
"Because You're My Woman" (with Lee Seung-gi)	2024	90	With
"Free" (with Arden Cho)	2025	—	Non-album single
"—" denotes a recording that did not chart or was not released in that territory

==== Soundtrack appearances ====
List of soundtrack appearances, showing year released, selected chart positions, and name of the album
Title	Year	Peak chart positions		Album
Title	Year	KOR	US World	Album
"Rainbow Falling"	2018	—	—	Gangnam Beauty OST. Part 7
"Get Myself With You"(S.O.U.L) (Note: S.O.U.L is a fictional band from the series Top Management. The song is performed by Cha Eun-woo, Jung Yoo-ahn and Ahn Hyo-seop as vocalists, with Bang Jae-min as rapper.)	2018	—	—	Top Management OST
"Gravity"(S.O.U.L)	2018	—	—	Top Management OST
"Me in"(S.O.U.L)	2018	—	—	Top Management OST
"Sugar Cane"(S.O.U.L)	2018	—	—	Top Management OST
"Together"	2018	—	—	Top Management OST
"Please Remember" (기억해줘요)	2019	—	—	Rookie Historian Goo Hae-ryung OST Part 6
"Love So Fine"	2021	165	13	True Beauty OST Part 8
"Don't Cry, My Love"	2021	— (Note: "Don't Cry, My Love" did not enter the Gaon Digital Chart, but appeared at number 36 on the component Download Chart.)	—	Under the Oak Tree OST
"Focus On Me"	2022	— (Note: "Focus On Me" did not enter the Gaon Digital Chart, but appeared at number 93 on the component Download Chart.)	—	The Villainess Is a Marionette OST
"Love Sailing" (항해) (Note: Includes the song New Love Sailing (Jam Tune) version.)	2022	— (Note: "Love Sailing" did not enter the Circle Digital Chart, but appeared at number 126 on the component Download Chart.)	—	Decibel OST
"Jealousy" (질투)	2023	— (Note: "Jealousy" did not enter the Circle Digital Chart, but appeared at number 26 on the component Download Chart.)	—	A Good Day to Be a Dog OST
"—" denotes releases that did not chart or were not released in that territory

=== Other charted songs ===
Title	Year	Peak chart positions	Album
Title	Year	KOR DL	Album
"U&I" (너와 단둘이)	2024	65	Entity
"Fu*king Great Time"	2024	74	Entity
"Where am I"	2024	71	Entity
"You're the Best"	2024	73	Entity

=== Songwriting credits ===
All song credits are adapted from the Korea Music Copyright Association's database unless stated otherwise.

Title	Year	Artist	Album	Lyricist	Composer
"You & Me (Thanks Aroha)"	2017	Astro	Winter Dream	Yes	No
"By Your Side" (너의 뒤에서)	2018	Astro	Rise Up	Yes	No
"Together"	2018	Himself	Top Management OST	Yes	No
"Merry-Go-Round (Christmas Edition)"	2018	Astro	Non-album single	Yes	No
"Merry-Go-Round"	2019	Astro	All Light	Yes	No
"No, I Don't.". (아니 그래)	2020	Astro	Non-album single	Yes	No
"After Midnight"	2021	Astro	Switch On	Yes	No
"Don't Worry"	2021	Astro	Switch On	Yes	Yes
"First Love"	2022	Himself	Drive to the Starry Road	Yes	No
"Stay"	2024	Himself	Entity	Yes	No
"Fu*king Great Time"	2024	Himself	Entity	Yes	No
"Where Am I"	2024	Himself	Entity	Yes	No
"U&I" (너와단둘이)	2024	Himself	Entity	Yes	No
"You're The Best"	2024	Himself	Entity	Yes	No
"Memories"	2024	Himself	Entity	Yes	No
"Moon" (꿈속의 문)	2025	Astro	Non-album single	Yes	No

== Videography ==
=== Music videos ===
Title	Year	Director(s)	Length	Ref.
"Stay"	2024	Sky (Sunny Visual)	4:21	
"Where Am I"	2024	Sky (Sunny Visual)	4:11	
"Saturday Preacher"	2025	Bliss	3:08	
"Sweet Papaya"	2025	Yuann	3:09	

== Filmography ==
Key
†	Denotes films that have not yet been released

=== Film ===
Year	Title	Role	Notes	Ref.
2014	My Brilliant Life	Healthy Ah-reum		
2022	Decibel	Jeon Tae-ryong	Cameo	
2025	Cha Eun-woo VR Concert: Memories	Himself		
2025	Cha Eun-woo: Memories in Cinemas	Himself		
2025	The First Ride	Ahn Yeon-min		

=== Television series ===
Year	Title	Role	Notes	Ref.
2017	Hit the Top	MJ		
2018	Gangnam Beauty	Do Kyung-seok		
2019	Rookie Historian Goo Hae-ryung	Yi Rim / Prince Dowon		
2020–2021	True Beauty	Lee Su-ho		
2022–2023	Island	John / Yohan / Kang Chan-hyuk	Part 1–2	
2023–2024	A Good Day to Be a Dog	Jin Seo-won		
2024	Wonderful World	Kwon Seon-yul		
2026	The Wonderfools	Lee Un-jeong		

=== Web series ===
Year	Title	Role	Ref.
2015	To Be Continued	Himself	
2016	My Romantic Some Recipe	Himself	
2017	Sweet Revenge	Himself	
2018	Top Management	Woo Yeon-woo	
2019	Soul Plate	Angel Raviel	

=== Television shows ===
Year	Title	Role	Ref.
2016	Law of the Jungle in New Caledonia	Cast member	
2020	Handsome Tigers	Cast member	
2020–2021	Master in the House	Cast member	
2024–2025	Rented in Finland	Cast member	

=== Web show ===
Year	Title	Role	Ref.
2018	Shoot-out Mart War	Cast member	

=== Hosting ===
Year	Title	Notes	Ref.
2016–2018	Show! Music Core	with Kim Sae-ron, Lee Soo-min and Xiyeon	
2017	MBC Gayo Daejejeon	with Suho and YoonA	
2018	Dream Concert	with Yoon Shi-yoon and Seol In-ah	
2018	MBC Gayo Daejejeon	with Noh Hong Chul, Minho and YoonA	
2019	MBC Gayo Daejejeon	with Jang Sung-kyu and YoonA	
2019	One K Concert (Note: Held at the National Assembly to commemorate the centennial of the March 1 Movement. The event was broadcast live on SBS Plus, SBS funE, and SBS MTV.)	with Lee Sang-min and Kim Se-jeong	
2020	Dream Concert	with Eunhyuk and Lia	
2020	KBS Song Festival	with Jung Yun-ho and Shin Ye-eun	
2020	SBS Entertainment Awards	with Shin Dong-yup and Lee Seung-gi	
2021	Dream Concert	with Leeteuk and Kim Do-yeon	
2021	Seoul International Drama Awards	with Park Eun-bin	
2021	KBS Song Festival	with Kim Seol-hyun and Rowoon	
2022	Seoul Festa (Note: Opening ceremony of the global tourism festival featuring the Seoul E-Prix, organized by the Seoul Metropolitan Government. The event was broadcast live on KBS World and KBS 2TV.)	with Kim Se-jeong	
2022	SBS Gayo Daejeon	with Key and An Yu-jin	
2022	Tainan World KPOP Concert (Note: Online concert organized by the Tainan City Government, livestreamed on YouTube on April 16, 2022. Cha Eun-woo served as MC.)	Host	
2024	38th Golden Disc Awards	with Sung Si-kyung	
2024	KCON Japan (Note: The event was broadcast live on Mnet.)	Host	
2025	39th Golden Disc Awards	with Sung Si-kyung and Moon Ga-young	

=== Music video appearances ===
Year	Song Title	Artist	Ref.
2017	"Mysterious"	Hello Venus	
2018	"You're the Reason"	Urban Zakapa	
2018	"As I Wished"	Urban Zakapa	
2020	"Dreamy Alarm"	Lee Jin-ah	
2025	"A Beautiful Person"	IU	

== Live performances ==
=== Music festivals ===
Event	Date	City	Country	Venue	Performed song(s)	Ref.
KROSS vol.1 – kpop masterz	January 2, 2023	Nagoya	Japan	Nagoya Dome	"Let's Say Goodbye to the Person You Like Most"; "First Love"; "Love So Fine"	
KCON Japan	May 11, 2024	Tokyo	Japan	Zozo Marine Stadium	"Stay"; "F*uking Great Time"	
Waterbomb	July 5, 2024	Seoul	South Korea	KINTEX	"F*uking Great Time"; "10 Minutes"; "Stay"	

=== Award shows ===
Event	Date	City	Country	Performed song(s)	Ref.
MTV Video Music Awards Japan	November 22, 2023	Yokohama	Japan	"Let's Say Goodbye to the Person You Like Most"	
38th Golden Disc Awards	January 6, 2024	Jakarta	Indonesia	"Every Moment Of You" (with Sung Si-kyung); "Even for a Moment" (with Sung Si-kyung)	

=== Television shows and specials ===
Event	Date	City	Country	Performed song(s)	Ref.
The Seasons: Lee Hyo-ri's Red Carpet	February 20, 2024	Seoul	South Korea	"10 Minutes"; "Stay"	

== Exhibitions ==
=== Photography exhibitions ===
Year	Title	Venue	Location	Ref.
2023	Archive	The Seouliteum	Seoul, South Korea	
2026	Afterimage	Ginza Novo	Tokyo, Japan	

== Accolades ==
=== Awards and nominations ===
Name of the award ceremony, year presented, category, nominee of the award, and the result of the nomination
Award ceremony	Year	Category	Nominee / Work	Result	Ref.
Anugerah Drama Sangat (Note: Anugerah Drama Sangat is a Malaysian TV awards ceremony by TV3 that honors excellence in local dramas, recognizing actors, directors, writers, producers, and other contributors.)	2023	Oppa Pilihan Tonton	Cha Eun-woo	Won	
APAN Music Awards	2020	Entertainer of the Year (Male) Award	Cha Eun-woo	Nominated	
APAN Star Awards	2023	Excellence Award, Actor in a Miniseries	Island	Nominated	
APAN Star Awards	2023	Best Couple Award (with Park Gyu-young)	A Good Day to Be a Dog	Nominated	
APAN Star Awards	2023	Best Original Soundtrack Award	"Jealousy"	Nominated	
APAN Star Awards	2024	Global Star Award	Cha Eun-woo	Nominated	
APAN Star Awards	2024	Best Entertainer Award	Cha Eun-woo	Nominated	
APAN Star Awards	2025	Best Entertainer Award	Cha Eun-woo	Won	
Asia Artist Awards	2018	Rising Star Award	Gangnam Beauty	Won	
Asia Artist Awards	2021	Popularity Actor Award	Cha Eun-woo	Nominated	
Asia Artist Awards	2021	Emotive Actor Award	True Beauty	Won	
Asia Artist Awards	2026	Popularity Award – Actor	Cha Eun-woo	Pending	
Asia Star Entertainer Awards	2025	Best Artist (Actor) Award	Wonderful World	Nominated	
Asia Star Entertainer Awards	2025	Fan Choice Artist (Actor) Award	Cha Eun-woo	Nominated	
Asia Star Entertainer Awards	2025	Best Solo (Male) Award	Cha Eun-woo	Nominated	
Asia Star Entertainer Awards	2026	Best Artist (Actor) Award	The First Ride	Nominated	
Asia Star Entertainer Awards	2026	Fan Choice Artist (Actor) Award	Cha Eun-woo	Nominated	
Asia Star Entertainer Awards	2026	Best Solo (Male) Award	Cha Eun-woo	Nominated	
Asian Culture Awards	2020	Best Korean Actor	True Beauty	Nominated	
Blue Dragon Film Awards	2026	Best New Actor Award	The First Ride	Longlisted	
Blue Dragon Ranking Awards (Note: The Blue Dragon Ranking is a popularity award organized by Sports Chosun, the organizer of the Blue Dragon Film Awards and Blue Dragon Series Awards. It recognizes trend-setting actors by presenting semiannual awards for Best Actor and Best Actress.)	2024	Best Actor Award (Note: First Half of 2024.)	A Good Day to Be a Dog	Won	
Blue Dragon Ranking Awards	2025	Best Actor Award (Note: First Half of 2025.)	Wonderful World	Won	
Blue Dragon Ranking Awards	2025	Best Actor Award (Note: Second Half of 2025.)	The First Ride	Won	
Blue Dragon Ranking Awards	2026	Best Actor Award (Note: First Half of 2026.)	The Wonderfools	Won	
Blue Dragon Series Awards	2023	Best New Actor Award	Island	Nominated	
Blue Dragon Series Awards	2023	Popularity Star Award	Cha Eun-woo	Won	
Blue Dragon Series Awards	2026	Best Actor	The Wonderfools	Longlisted	
Brand Customer Loyalty Awards (Note: Co-organized by the Korean Customers Council and Brand Keys, this event recognizes the most influential brands in society and culture, as determined through consumer research.)	2021	Best Male Idol-Actor Award	Cha Eun-woo	Won	
Brand Customer Loyalty Awards	2023	Best Male Idol-Actor Award	Cha Eun-woo	Won	
Brand Customer Loyalty Awards	2024	Male Actor Hot Trend Award	Cha Eun-woo	Won	
Brand Customer Loyalty Awards	2025	Male Advertising Model Award	Cha Eun-woo	Won	
Brand of the Year Awards (Note: Established in 2003, the Brand of the Year Awards is an awards ceremony based on nationwide surveys hosted by the Korea Consumer Brand Committee and organized by the Korea Consumer Forum.)	2021	Actor of the Year (Idol) Award	Cha Eun-woo	Won	
Brand of the Year Awards	2023	Actor of the Year (Idol) Award	Cha Eun-woo	Won	
BreakTudo Awards	2024	Crush International	Cha Eun-woo	Won	
First Trusted Premium Brands Awards	2025	Actor Award	Cha Eun-woo	Won	
Fn New Trend Awards	2025	Film/Drama Award	Cha Eun-woo	Won	
Fn New Trend Awards	2025	Hot Icon Award	Cha Eun-woo	Won	
Global Fan's Choice Awards	2025	Best K-Pop Performer	Cha Eun-woo	Nominated	
Global Fan's Choice Awards	2025	K-Drama Star of the Year	Cha Eun-woo	Won	
HallyuTalk Awards	2023	Star of the Year Award	Cha Eun-woo	Won	
Hanteo Music Awards	2024	Global Artist Award – North America	Cha Eun-woo	Nominated	
Hanteo Music Awards	2024	Global Artist Award – South America	Cha Eun-woo	Nominated	
Indonesian Television Awards	2018	Special Award – Person of the Year	Cha Eun-woo	Won	
iMBC Awards (Note: iMBC Awards, hosted by iMBC Entertainment, MBC Group's only entertainment news outlet, honors artists and actors with outstanding achievements in the industry.)	2025	Best Actor Award	Wonderful World	Won	
iMBC Awards	2026	Best Actor Award	The Wonderfools	Nominated	
iQIYI Entertainment Awards	2018	Most Charming Actor Award	Gangnam Beauty	Won	
K-Brand Index Star Awards (Note: The K-Brand Index Star Awards is an award based on big data analysis conducted by the Asia Brand Research Institute, evaluating major figures through a system developed in collaboration with domestic and international researchers and validated by expert panels at every stage.)	2026	Advertising Model Award	Cha Eun-woo	Won	
K-Star Chart (Note: The K-STAR CHART awards recognize the top K-pop artists and songs.)	2026	Best Viral (Note: 1st Season. The Best Viral award recognizes songs and artists that created global movements and dominated social media (SNS viral hits).)	"Saturday Preacher"	Won	
K-Star Chart	2026	Best Solo & Featuring (Note: 3rd Season)	"Saturday Preacher"	Won	
KBS N Brand Awards	2026	Acting Grand Prize	Cha Eun-woo	Pending	
Korea Best Brand Awards (Note: Co-organized by Forbes Korea and JoongAng Ilbo, this event recognizes the top brands across various sectors, as determined through evaluations of brand value conducted with panels of consumers and industry experts.)	2026	Actor Award	Cha Eun-woo	Won	
Korea Drama Awards	2018	Best New Actor Award	Gangnam Beauty	Won	
Korea Drama Awards	2018	Hallyu Star Award	Gangnam Beauty	Won	
Korea Drama Awards	2024	Excellence Actor Award	Wonderful World	Nominated	
Korea Drama Awards	2024	Global Star Award	Wonderful World	Nominated	
Korea Drama Awards	2024	Hot Star Award	Wonderful World	Nominated	
Korea Drama Awards	2024	Hot Icon Award	Cha Eun-woo	Nominated	
Korea Drama Awards	2026	Best Couple Award (with Park Eun-bin)	The Wonderfools	Nominated	
Korea Drama Awards	2026	Global Star Award	The Wonderfools	Nominated	
Korea Drama Awards	2026	Hot Star Award	The Wonderfools	Nominated	
Korea First Brand Awards	2019	Best Male Idol-Actor Award	Gangnam Beauty	Won	
Korea First Brand Awards	2019	Best Male Commercial Model Award	Cha Eun-woo	Won	
Korea First Brand Awards	2024	Best Male Idol-Actor Award (Vietnam)	A Good Day to Be a Dog	Won	
Korea Grand Music Awards	2024	Best Artist 10	Cha Eun-woo	Nominated	
Korea Grand Music Awards	2024	Trend of the Year – K-pop Solo	Cha Eun-woo	Nominated	
Korea Grand Music Awards	2025	Trend of the Year – K-pop Solo	Cha Eun-woo	Nominated	
Korea Grand Music Awards	2026	Trend of the Year – K-pop Solo	Cha Eun-woo	Nominated	
Korea Social Contribution Awards (Note: The Korea Social Contribution Awards recognizes individuals who have contributed to creating "a healthier and happier society". The awards are sponsored by 10 government ministries including the Ministry of Education, the Ministry of Health and Welfare and the Ministry of Foreign Affairs, as well as public institutions.)	2025	Minister of Foreign Affairs Award (Note: Good Influence category: Sharing Icon of the Year)	Cha Eun-woo	Nominated	
Korea Trusted Innovation Awards	2025	Culture and Art Innovation Award	Cha Eun-woo	Won	
Korean Wave Entertainment Awards	2026	Best Male Actor – Popularity Award	Cha Eun-woo	Pending	
MBC Drama Awards	2019	Excellence Award for an Actor in a Wednesday-Thursday Drama	Rookie Historian Goo Hae-ryung	Won	
MBC Drama Awards	2019	Best Couple Award (with Shin Se-kyung)	Rookie Historian Goo Hae-ryung	Won	
MBC Drama Awards	2023	Top Excellence Award, Actor in a Miniseries	A Good Day to Be a Dog	Nominated	
MBC Drama Awards	2023	Best Couple Award (with Park Gyu-young)	A Good Day to Be a Dog	Nominated	
MBC Drama Awards	2024	Top Excellence Award, Actor in a Miniseries	Wonderful World	Nominated	
MBC Entertainment Awards	2016	Rookie Award in Music / Talk Show – Male	Show! Music Core	Nominated	
MBC Entertainment Awards	2017	Rookie Award in Show / Sitcom – Male	Show! Music Core	Nominated	
Mega Champ Awards	2025	Best Actor Award	The First Ride	Won	
MTV Video Music Awards Japan	2023	Global Icon Award (Note: Global Icon Award was introduced in 2021 and it is awarded to bands and musicians with "an unparalleled career and continued influence" and has achieved "global success in music and beyond".)	Cha Eun-woo	Won	
MTN Broadcast Advertising Festival	2017	CF Male Star Award	Cha Eun-woo	Won	
MTN Broadcast Advertising Festival	2025	Viewers Choice Award	Cha Eun-woo	Nominated	
SBS Entertainment Awards	2020	Rookie of the Year Award	Master in the House	Won	
Seoul International Drama Awards	2023	Outstanding Asian Star Award	Island	Nominated	
Seoul International Drama Awards	2024	Outstanding Asian Star Award	Wonderful World	Nominated	
Seoul International Drama Awards	2026	Outstanding Asian Star Award	The Wonderfools	Nominated	
Seoul Success Awards	2026	Global Fan's Choice Actor Grand Prize (Daesang)	Cha Eun-woo	Won	
Soompi Awards	2019	Breakout Actor Award	Gangnam Beauty	Won	
Soompi Awards	2019	Best Idol Actor Award	Gangnam Beauty	Nominated	
Soompi Awards	2019	Best Couple Award (with Im Soo-hyang)	Gangnam Beauty	Nominated	
Top Ten Awards (Note: Top Ten Awards, hosted by Ten Asia since 2018, is Korea's No. 1 global K-Pop awards show that honors the best global artists.)	2025	Best Actor	Wonderful World	Won	
Top Ten Awards	2025	Best Solo Idol (Male)	Cha Eun-woo	Nominated	
Top Ten Awards	2026	Best Actor	The Wonderfools	Won	
Yahoo! Asia Buzz Awards	2018	Most Searched Rookie Actor Award	Gangnam Beauty	Won	

=== State and cultural honors ===
Name of country or organization, year given, and name of honor
Country or organization	Award Ceremony	Year	Honor Or Award	Ref.
South Korea	Korean Popular Culture and Arts Awards (Note: Honors are given at the Korean Popular Culture and Arts Awards, arranged by the Korea Creative Content Agency and hosted by the Ministry of Culture, Sports and Tourism. They are awarded to those who have contributed to the arts and South Korea's pop culture.)	2024	Minister of Culture, Sports and Tourism Commendation	
South Korea	Newsis K-Expo Cultural Awards (Note: Established in 2019 and co-sponsored by Korea's Ministry of Culture, Sports and Tourism, Ministry of Foreign Affairs, Korea Creative Content Agency, Seoul Metropolitan Council and the Seoul Tourism Organization, it awards cultural icons, businesses, and individuals who have contributed greatly to Hallyu, the Korean wave.)	2020	Seoul Tourism Organization CEO Award	

=== Listicles ===
Name of publisher, year listed, name of listicle, and placement
Publisher	Year	Listicle	Placement	Ref.
Asia-Pacific Entrepreneurs Association (APEA)	2025	Asia-Pacific Leaders Under 30	Included	
Cine21	2024	Most Influential Actors (Series)	4th	
Forbes	2021	Korea Power Celebrity 40	17th	
Forbes	2024	Korea Power Celebrity 40	11th	
Forbes	2025	Korea Power Celebrity 40	12th	
Forbes	2026	Korea Power Celebrity 40	21th	
Forbes	2022	Best Brand Ambassador	5th	
Forbes	2022	Trustworthy Idol Actor	2nd	
Forbes	2023	30 Under 30 – Korea	Included	
Forbes	2025	30 Under 30 – Asia	Included	
Forbes	2025	Celebrity Who Achieved the Most Dazzling Growth	1st	
Forbes	2025	CF Genius Celebrity (Note: CF Genius is an award title for celebrities who are masters at commercials (Commercial Film). It recognizes stars who most effectively boost consumers' desire to purchase products through their advertising appearances.)	1st	
Forbes	2025	CF Genius Idol	2nd	
Forbes	2026	Top Power Celebrity (Note: Selected from approximately 70 candidates for the Forbes Korea Power Celebrity 40 'Top Power Celebrity'.)	3rd	
Gallup Korea	2023	Television Actor of the Year	11th	
Gallup Korea	2024	Television Actor of the Year	8th	
Gallup Korea	2025	Television Actor of the Year	13th	
Gallup Korea	2024	Film Actor of the Year	18th	
Gallup Korea	2024	Favorite Television Actor	3rd	
Gallup Korea	2024	Most Anticipated Idol Actor on the Big Screen	2nd	
Gallup Korea	2024	Most Anticipated Next Generation Actor	1st	
GQ Korea	2018	Men of the Year (Note: The honorees, selected by the magazine's editorial boards, are chosen based on their cultural impact and professional achievements during the year.)	Included	
Joy News 24	2023	Entertainment Power People	Included	
Joy News 24	2025	Entertainment Power People	Included	
News1	2018	Acting Idol of the Year (Note: Idols who were recognized for their acting skills.)	3rd	
News1	2018	Best New Actor of the Year (Note: Year-end survey of 25 industry experts, including drama PDs and officials from production companies and agencies, conducted by News1.)	1st	
News1	2019	Actor Expected to Make a Breakthrough in 2019 (Note: Survey conducted among 25 drama industry experts (including producers, writers, and marketing executives) to select the most anticipated stars of the year.)	3rd	
Madame Tussauds	2025	Hot 100 (Note: The 2025 list, dubbed the 'Hot 100' to mirror the prominence and stature of its selections, features a collection of the world's most influential people, spanning talents from acting, music, fashion, sports, and culture, and celebrates their global impact and diverse achievements.)	Included	
Ministry of Culture, Sports and Tourism	2025	Favorite Korean Actor	10th	
Ministry of Culture, Sports and Tourism	2026	Favorite Korean Actor	9th	
Star News	2023	Best Idol-Actor of the Year (Male)	4th	
Teen Vogue	2025	New Hollywood Class of 2025 (Note: New Hollywood's rising stars. These are the young celebrities shaping up to be the next generation of tastemakers.)	Included	
Vogue Korea	2018	2018 Next Generation (Note: The next-generation stars expected to follow in the footsteps of established industry pillars.)	Included	
