= 15th Korea Drama Awards =

2024 edition of award ceremony

- Awarded by: Korea Drama Festival Organizing Committee; Ministry of Culture, Sports and Tourism; South Gyeongsang Province; Jinju
- Date: October 12, 2024
- Site: Gyeongnam Culture and Arts Center, Grand Performance Hall, Jinju, South Gyeongsang Province, South Korea
- Hosted by: Lee Sang-min; Oh Jung-yeon
- Official website: Korea Drama Awards

Highlights
- Best Drama Serial: Queen of Tears
- Grand Prize (Daesang): Lee Hanee

Television coverage
- Network: Seokyeong Broadcasting; Korea Drama Festival YouTube channel

The 15th Korea Drama Awards is an awards ceremony for excellence in television in South Korea. It was held on October 12, 2024, as an event of the Korea Drama Festival at Gyeongnam Culture and Arts Center, Grand Performance Hall, Jinju. It was hosted by Lee Sang-min and Oh Jung-yeon.

== Nominations and winners ==
The nominations were announced on October 11, 2023, for the dramas of all genres airing domestically from October 2023 to September 2024.

Grand Prize (Daesang)	Best Drama
Lee Hanee – Knight Flower; Kim Soo-hyun – Queen of Tears; Byeon Woo-seok – Lovely Runner; Kim Ji-won – Queen of Tears; Jo Jung-suk – Captivating the King; Ji Sung – Connection	Queen of Tears (tvN)
Top Excellence Award, Actor	Top Excellence Award, Actress
Im Si-wan – Boyhood; Kim Soo-hyun – Queen of Tears; Byeon Woo-seok – Lovely Runner; Ji Chang-wook – Welcome to Samdal-ri; Ahn Bo-hyun – Flex X Cop; Ji Sung – Connection	Jung Ryeo-won – The Midnight Romance in Hagwon; Kim Ji-won – Queen of Tears; Park Min-young – Marry My Husband; Park Bo-young – Daily Dose of Sunshine; Shin Hye-sun – Welcome to Samdal-ri; Lee Se-young – The Story of Park's Marriage Contract
Excellence Award, Actor	Excellence Award, Actress
Ji Seung-hyun – Korea–Khitan War; Lee Yi-kyung – Marry My Husband; Nam Joo-hyuk – Vigilante; Jang Ki-yong – The Atypical Family; Wi Ha-joon – The Midnight Romance in Hagwon; Cha Eun-woo – Wonderful World	Go Min-si – Sweet Home 2; Kim Hye-yoon – Lovely Runner; Jung Eun-ji – Miss Night and Day; Park So-dam – Death's Game; Claudia Kim – The Atypical Family; Jin Ki-joo – Uncle Samsik
Best New Actor	Best New Actress
Baek Seo-hoo – Miss Night and Day; Lee Si-woo – Boyhood; Lee Seung-hyub – Lovely Runner; Lee Jong-won – Knight Flower	Kang Hye-won – Boyhood; Lee Joo-bin – Queen of Tears; Kang Mi-na – Welcome to Samdal-ri
Hot Star Award (Male)	Hot Star Award (Female)
Byeon Woo-seok – Lovely Runner; Kim Soo-hyun – Queen of Tears; Rowoon – The Matchmakers; Cha Eun-woo – Wonderful World	Kim Ji-won – Queen of Tears; Kim Hye-yoon – Lovely Runner; Kim Yoo-jung – My Demon; Kim So-hyun – Serendipity's Embrace
Best Couple	Global Star Award
Kim Soo-hyun and Kim Ji-won – Queen of Tears; Byeon Woo-seok and Kim Hye-yoon – Lovely Runner; Song Kang and Kim Yoo-jung – My Demon; Chae Jong-hyeop and Kim So-hyun – Serendipity's Embrace	Kim Soo-hyun – Queen of Tears; Kim Ji-won – Queen of Tears; Kim Hye-yoon – Lovely Runner; Byeon Woo-seok – Lovely Runner; Cha Eun-woo – Wonderful World
Best OST Award	Hot Icon Award
"More Than Enough" (Kim Tae-rae (Zerobaseone)) – Queen of Tears; "Destiny" (Seungmin) – The Midnight Studio; "Way Home" (Kim Soo-hyun) – Queen of Tears; "Sudden Shower" (Byeon Woo-seok) – Lovely Runner	Park Jae-chan; D.O.; Cha Eun-woo; Lee Jun-ho
Lifetime Achievement Award	KDF Award
Byun Hee-bong	Kim Yoon-seo; Lee Ga-ryeong
