= Seoul Tourism Awards =

The Seoul Tourism Awards event was established in South Korea by the Seoul Metropolitan Government in 2008 to showcase Seoul as a tourist destination and to recognize the contributions of individual members and companies of the travel industry in developing Asia Pacific tourism.

== The awards ==
The Seoul Tourism Organization organizes the annual gala event which is expected to draw over 500 participants. Awards categories include Best Overall Contribution, Best Tourist Service Provider, Best Tourist Service Business, Best Travel Business Promoter, Best City Tourism Policy and Promotion, Best Tourism Business, Best Online Tourism Promotion and Best Convention Hosting. To further encourage international cooperation, the 2009 event was expanded to include 19 awards and featured a business travel mart.

== 2008 ==
The 2008 top award went to Dubai's ruler Mohammed bin Rashid Al Maktoum for his leadership in transforming Dubai into an international travel destination while Peter de Jong, then CEO of PATA, was honored with the Special Award for Best International Contribution to City Tourism. The top award for contribution to Seoul City Tourism went to Mr. Song Seung Hwan/CEO of PMC Production. Song's non-verbal performance production "Nanta" has attracted foreign audiences of more than 1 million people.

Celebrities were also recognized for their contributions to promoting Seoul. Jackie Chan received the Best Foreign Star Promoting Seoul Tourism Award while Jang Na-ra received the Best Korean Star Promoting Seoul Tourism Award. The Best Sight Seeing City in Asia-Pacific Award went to Hong Kong, while Tokyo Tower received the Best City Landmark in Asia-Pacific Award. The Best Cultural Tourism Program in Asia-Pacific Award was given to the Sapporo Snow Festival and the Best Cultural City Tourism Program in Seoul Award went to the Hi-Seoul Festival.
