= Island (South Korean TV series) =

2022–2023 South Korean web series

- Promotional poster
- Hangul: 아일랜드
- RR: Aillaendeu
- MR: Aillaendŭ
- Genre: Fantasy; Action
- Based on: Island by Yoon In-wan and Yang Kyung-il
- Developed by: Studio Dragon (planning)
- Written by: Oh Bo-hyun
- Directed by: Bae Jong
- Starring: Kim Nam-gil; Lee Da-hee; Cha Eun-woo; Sung Joon
- Music by: Kim Sung-su
- Country of origin: South Korea
- Original language: Korean
- No. of episodes: 12

Production
- Executive producers: Jang Jeong-do; Kim Seung-min (CP)
- Producers: Baek Chung-hwa; Mi Tae-hee
- Animator: Kwon Gwang-gu
- Editors: Choi Min-young; Choi Kyung-yoon
- Production companies: YLab; Studio Dragon; Gilstory Ent

Original release
- Network: TVING
- Release: December 30, 2022 – March 10, 2023
- Network: tvN
- Release: February 10 – February 25, 2023

Island (Korean: 아일랜드) is a 2022–2023 South Korean television series starring Kim Nam-gil, Lee Da-hee, Cha Eun-woo, and Sung Joon. Part 1 of the series aired on TVING from December 30, 2022, to January 13, 2023, and later aired on tvN from February 10 to 25, 2023, every Friday and Saturday at 22:10 (KST). Part 2 of the series aired from February 24 to March 10, 2023. Amazon Prime Video acquired the rights to distribute the series in 240 countries.

The first episode of Island was screened at the Rendez-vous (non-competition section) of the 2023 Cannes International Series Festival on April 19, 2023.

== Synopsis ==
Based on the graphic novel, which was later published as a webtoon series on Naver Webtoon, the series is set on Jeju Island where three people fight against an evil that is trying to destroy the world.

== Cast ==
=== Main ===
- Kim Nam-gil as Van
  - Kim Seo-joon as young Van
- Lee Da-hee as Won Mi-ho / Wonjeong
  - Park Seo-kyung as young Wonjeong / Won Mi-ho
- Cha Eun-woo as Priest Johan
  - Ki Eun-yoo as young Priest Johan
- Sung Joon as Gungtan
  - Kim Min-jun as young Gungtan

=== Supporting ===
==== Granny Haenyeo's Home ====
- Go Doo-shim as Geum Baek-ju
- Heo Jung-hee as Boo Yeom-ji
  - Kwon Ye-eun as young Boo Yeom-ji

==== Daehan Group ====
- Jeon Kuk-hwan as Won Tae-han
- Oh Kwang-rok as Butler Jang
- Lee Soon-won as Secretary Kang

==== Jijangjong ====
- Park Geun-hyung as Jongryeong
- Keum Kwang-san as monk
- Kang Hyun-joong as monk
- Kim Jin-man as monk

==== Tamra High School ====
- Kim Ki-cheon as Principal Lee San-il
- Yoo Seung-ok as Han Su-jin
- Chung Su-bin as Lee Su-ryun

==== Others ====
- Lee Hang-na as Won Bo-ram
- Yoo Yi-jun as Kyung-jun
- Jeon Ji-hwan
- Kim Sung-oh as Yul

=== Special appearance ===
- Choi Tae-joon as Kang Chan-hee
- Kim Min-jun as groom

== Production ==
Filming was scheduled to start in October 2021. On December 20, 2021, actress Lee Da-hee was injured while filming, which her agency confirmed to be a neck injury.

On May 24, 2022, actor Cha Eun-woo posted a photo on SNS saying that his part had finished filming.

== Release ==
The series was originally made available for streaming through TVING and Amazon Prime Video. Part 1 premiered on TVING and Amazon Prime Video on December 30, 2022, followed by the premiere on TVN on February 10, 2023. Part 2 premiered on TVING and Amazon Prime Video on February 24, 2023.

=== Broadcast ===
Amazon Prime Video acquired the international rights to distribute Island in 240 countries outside of South Korea in October 2022.

== Viewership ==
Island : South Korea viewers per episode (thousands)

Part	Episode number						Average
Part	1	2	3	4	5	6	Average
1	637	281	543	363	488	280	432
2	TBD	TBD	TBD	TBD	TBD	TBD	TBD

Source: Audience measurement performed nationwide by Nielsen Korea.

Average TV viewership ratings
Ep.	Original broadcast date (tvN)	Average audience share (Nielsen Korea)	
Ep.	Original broadcast date (tvN)	Nationwide	Seoul
Part 1
1	February 10, 2023	2.833% (1st)	3.042% (1st)
2	February 11, 2023	2.046% (5th)	2.417% (3rd)
3	February 17, 2023	2.362% (2nd)	2.723% (2nd)
4	February 18, 2023	1.515% (8th)	1.984% (3rd)
5	February 24, 2023	2.095% (2nd)	2.619% (2nd)
6	February 25, 2023	1.280% (15th)	N/A
Average		2.022%	— (Note: Due to some unpublished ratings, the exact average rating is unknown.)
In the table above, the blue numbers represent the lowest ratings and the red numbers represent the highest ratings.; N/A denotes that the rating were not known.; This drama aired on a cable channel/pay TV which normally has a relatively smaller audience compared to free-to-air TV/public broadcasters (KBS, SBS, MBC and EBS).

== Awards and nominations ==
Name of the award ceremony, year presented, award category, nominee(s) of the award, and the result of the nomination
Award	Year	Category	Nominee(s) / Work(s)	Result	Ref.
APAN Star Awards	2023	Excellence Award, Actor in a Miniseries	Cha Eun-woo	Nominated	
Asian Academy Creative Awards	2023	Best Original Productions By A Streamer/OTT (National Winners – Korea)	Island	Won	
Asian Television Awards	2024	Best Original Digital Drama Series	Island	Won	
Blue Dragon Series Awards	2023	Best New Actor	Island	Nominated	
Blue Dragon Series Awards	2023	Popularity Star Award	Cha Eun-woo	Won	
Brand Customer Loyalty Awards (Note: Co-organized by the Korean Customers Council and Brand Keys, this event recognizes the most influential brands in society and culture, as determined through consumer research.)	2023	Best Male Idol-Actor	Cha Eun-woo	Won	
Brand of the Year Awards	2023	Actor of the Year – Idol	Cha Eun-woo	Won	
