= The First Ride =

2025 film by Nam Dae-joong

- Theatrical release poster
- Hangul: 퍼스트 라이드
- RR: Peoseuteu raideu
- MR: P'ŏsŭt'ŭ raidŭ
- Directed by: Nam Dae-joong
- Written by: Nam Dae-joong
- Produced by: Jang Seong-uk; Kim Tae-ho
- Starring: Kang Ha-neul; Kim Young-kwang; Cha Eun-woo; Kang Young-seok; Han Sun-hwa
- Cinematography: Nam Dong-geun
- Edited by: Park Joo-young
- Music by: Jeong Sang-woo
- Production companies: Brain Shower; TH Story
- Distributed by: Showbox
- Release date: October 29, 2025
- Running time: 116 minutes
- Country: South Korea
- Language: Korean
- Box office: US$4.7 million

The First Ride (Korean: 퍼스트 라이드) is a 2025 South Korean adventure drama film written and directed by Nam Dae-joong. The film, starring Kang Ha-neul, Kim Young-kwang, Cha Eun-woo, Kang Young-seok, and Han Sun-hwa, depicts the unpredictable events that unfold as a group of childhood friends goes on its first dream trip abroad. It was released theatrically on October 29, 2025 in South Korea.

== Plot ==
Tae-jung, Do-jin, Yeon-min, and Geum-bok have been close friends since early childhood. While in high school, Tae-jung achieves a perfect score on the national college entrance examination, and the four friends obtain their parents' permission to take a graduation trip to Thailand, which is also meant to be their last chance to travel together before Yeon-min emigrates abroad. However, after missing the airport bus, they fail to catch their flight and the trip is canceled.

Ten years later, Tae-jung, who has long aspired to become president, is working as a parliamentary aide while maintaining his political ambitions. Do-jin, who has been receiving treatment for a psychiatric illness that developed after high school, shows signs of improvement and suggests that they finally take the trip they were unable to make years earlier. Geum-bok, who is preparing to formally enter monastic life, also wishes for one last act of freedom before ordination. Tae-jung agrees to join them, promising to return before an upcoming party convention, and the group departs for Pattaya during the Songkran music festival. They are joined by a dakimakura representing Yeon-min, who had emigrated to New Zealand, and by Ok-sim, a friend of Tae-jung's younger sister who has an unrequited crush on him.

Shortly after arriving in Thailand, the group meets Tai Park, who has come to drive them to their accommodation. On the way, a traffic accident occurs involving another vehicle, leading to an argument. When Tae-jung attempts to intervene, Tai Park suddenly punches Tae-jung, knocking him unconscious. Tai Park flees into the sea and the police arrive. After learning that the vehicle Tai Park was driving was stolen, the group is taken to the police station. With assistance from the Korean embassy, they are soon released and proceed to their lodging.

Do-jin's mental condition deteriorates during the trip, causing repeated conflicts and disturbances. When Tae-jung tries to retrieve Do-jin's medication at a nightclub, an altercation with patrons leads to police intervention, during which an officer mistakenly tasers Ok-sim. Footage of the incident reaches South Korea, prompting Tae-jung's superior, Assemblyman Nam Joong-dae, to reprimand him. Tae-jung subsequently clashes with his friends, particularly over Yeon-min's dakimakura. Do-jin accuses him of having abandoned Yeon-min in the past to protect his own future. The two eventually reconcile.

Despite the earlier chaos, the group enjoys the Songkran music festival. Later, while drinking with Sylvia, a Korean bartender they befriended during the trip, they lose consciousness and awaken in an illegal organ-harvesting facility. Ok-sim, who had been arrested separately for failing to pay at a hotel restaurant, recognizes Sylvia on a wanted poster at the police station and claims to know her whereabouts. By leading the police to Sylvia, Ok-sim manages to rescue her friends before the operation is carried out. As the facility burns during the escape, Do-jin insists on retrieving Yeon-min's dakimakura, causing another confrontation. It is revealed that the real reason the friends never went on their high school trip was not because they missed the bus, but because Yeon-min had died in an ensuing traffic accident. Do-jin's illness stems from guilt over abandoning Yeon-min, who was severely injured and unable to move after the crash, out of fear instead of helping him. Unable to let Yeon-min go, Do-jin breaks down, prompting Tae-jung to re-enter the facility to retrieve the dakimakura.

The group rushes to the airport but arrives too late to board their flight. Tae-jung despairs, believing he will miss the party convention, but Ok-sim intervenes by stopping the plane on the runway, allowing them to board in time. After returning to South Korea, the friends gather at Yeon-min's grave to share memories. Tae-jung successfully delivers his speech, helping Assemblyman Nam become party leader. Do-jin attends a job interview at a travel agency. Ok-sim is briefly detained by Thai authorities due to the airport incident but is released through Tae-jung's diplomatic efforts. On the day of her return to Korea, Tae-jung meets Ok-sim at the airport and accepts the ring she had previously given him.

== Cast ==
- Kang Ha-neul as Jung Tae-jung
- Kim Young-kwang as Ko Do-jin
- Cha Eun-woo as Ahn Yeon-min
- Kang Young-seok as Kye Geum-bok
- Han Sun-hwa as Jin Ok-sim
- Ko Kyu-pil as Tai Park
- Choi Gwi-hwa as Assemblyman Nam Joong-dae
- Yoon Kyung-ho as Consulate employee
- Kang Ji-young as Sylvia

== Production ==
In April 2025, Showbox announced that Kang Ha-neul, Kim Young-kwang, Cha Eun-woo, Kang Young-seok, and Han Sun-hwa had been cast in the film, with principal photography having already begun. Filming began on March 21, 2025, and ended on June 11.

The First Ride was included in the lineup for the 2025 Cannes Film Market.

On July 28, 2025, the first promotional image was released, confirming an October theatrical release. On September 12, 2025, the release date of October 29 was announced along with a new poster. Character posters and teaser videos were released on September 18, 2025. Additional posters and the official trailer were released on September 26, 2025.

== Release ==
The First Ride was released in South Korean theaters on October 29, 2025, by Showbox.

A special premiere screening took place on October 20, 2025, at the Ewha Womans University auditorium in Seoul.

According to distributor Showbox, the film opened in Mongolia and Indonesia on November 7, followed by Macao, Singapore, and Hong Kong on November 13, Taiwan on November 14, Thailand on November 20, and Vietnam on November 21. Malaysia followed on November 13, while the Philippines received the film on December 10 through Purple Plan. Australia and New Zealand followed in November 2025.

Theatrical distribution in Cambodia, Brunei, Laos, and Myanmar was also confirmed. The theatrical release in Japan is scheduled for September 25, 2026.

It is scheduled to be screened as part of the non-competitive feature film selection at the 4th Korean Film Festival Brazil (KOFF 2026), which will be held in several Brazilian cities from August to October 2026.

=== Home media ===
The film became available for digital purchase and rental (VOD) in South Korea on December 4, 2025, through IPTV services, digital cable TV, and various OTT platforms, including Wavve, Watcha, Coupang Play, Apple TV, Google TV, and YouTube. In Taiwan, The First Ride was added to the OTT platform friDay Video (friDay影音) on February 14, 2026. It was also made available on Hami Video, LINE TV, and Chunghwa Telecom MOD. In Indonesia, the film was made available on Vidio, while Viu Indonesia announced that it would be available on the platform in August 2026. In Vietnam, the film was listed on VieON under the local title Anh Trai Say Xe. In Thailand, Viu scheduled the film to stream on September 13, 2026, at 10:00 p.m.

A limited-edition Blu-ray was released by NOVA Media on July 31, 2026.

=== Television ===
The film had its South Korean television premiere on OCN on August 21, 2026. It was scheduled to air on tvN Movies in Indonesia and Malaysia on September 12, 2026.

== Box office ==
The film was released on October 29, 2025 on 1,227 screens.

It grossed US$4,660,158 from 742,535 admissions. The film's target break-even point was 1,600,000 admissions.

== Accolades ==
Award	Year	Category	Recipient(s)	Result	Ref.
Asia Star Entertainer Awards	2025	Best Artist (Actor) Award	Cha Eun-woo	Nominated	
Blue Dragon Ranking Awards (Note: The Blue Dragon Ranking is a popularity award hosted by Sports Chosun, the organizer of the Blue Dragon Film Awards and Blue Dragon Series Awards. It recognizes trend-setting actors by presenting semiannual awards for Best Actor and Best Actress.)	2025	Best Actor Award (Note: Second Half of 2025.)	Cha Eun-woo	Won	
Fn New Trend Awards	2025	Film/Drama Award	Cha Eun-woo	Won	
Golden Cinematography Awards	2026	Cinematographers' Choice Popularity Award	Han Sun-hwa	Won	
Mega Champ Awards	2025	Best Actor Award	Cha Eun-woo	Won	
