= Baek Seo-hoo =

South Korean actor (born 1996)

- Born: South Korea
- Occupation: Actor
- Years active: 2019–present
- Agent: n.CH Entertainment

Korean name
- Hangul: 백서후
- RR: Baek Seohu
- MR: Paek Sŏhu
- Website: Official website

Baek Seo-hoo (Korean: 백서후; born 1996), is a South Korean actor under n.CH Entertainment. His acting debut was on the web series Love Revolution.

He debuted as an actor in Kakao TV's Love Revolution (2020) and has been active in various works such as Color Rush, Café Minamdang, Heartbeat and Miss Night and Day.

== Filmography ==
=== Television series ===
Year	Title	Role	Ref.
2020	Color Rush	Jung Joo-hang	
2021	Idol: The Coup	Tae-yong	
2022	Café Minamdang	Jo Na-dan	
2023	Sound Candy	Boo Hyun-jun	
2023	Heartbeat	Ri Man-hwi	
2024	Miss Night and Day	Go-won	
2025	Study Group	Ma Min-hwan	

=== Web series ===
Year	Title	Role	Ref.
2020	Love Revolution	Unknown	
2021	Sometoon	Tae-i / Lim Soo-gi	

== Awards and nominations ==
Name of the award ceremony, year presented, award category, nominee(s) of the award, and the result of the nomination
Award ceremony	Year	Category	Nominee(s) / Work(s)	Result	Ref.
Korea Drama Awards	2024	Best New Actor	Miss Night and Day	Won	
Korea First Brand Awards	2025	Best New Actor	Baek Seo-hoo	Won	
