= Wonderful World (South Korean TV series) =

2024 South Korean television series

- Promotional poster
- Hangul: 원더풀 월드
- RR: Wondeopul woldeu
- MR: Wŏndŏp'ul wŏldŭ
- Genre: Revenge drama; Thriller; Mystery
- Developed by: Kwon Sung-chang (planning)
- Written by: Kim Ji-eun
- Directed by: Lee Seung-young; Jung Sang-hee
- Starring: Kim Nam-joo; Cha Eun-woo; Kim Kang-woo; Im Se-mi
- Music by: Gaemi
- Country of origin: South Korea
- Original language: Korean
- No. of episodes: 14

Production
- Executive producer: Hwang Chul-min
- Producers: Ahn Je-hyun; Shin Sang-yoon; Choi Hye-seon
- Cinematography: Park Sung; Yoon Tae-hoon
- Editor: Sun Han-saem
- Running time: 70 minutes
- Production company: Samhwa Networks

Original release
- Network: MBC TV
- Release: March 1 – April 13, 2024

Wonderful World (Korean: 원더풀 월드) is a 2024 South Korean television series starring Kim Nam-joo, Cha Eun-woo, Kim Kang-woo, and Im Se-mi. It aired on MBC TV from March 1, to April 13, 2024, every Friday and Saturday at 21:50 (KST). It is also available for streaming on Disney+ in selected regions. The series received generally positive reviews from critics, who praised its atmospheric storytelling and the lead performances.

== Synopsis ==
Wonderful World tells a story about an author and professor whose life falls apart after her son is killed in a hit-and-run accident. She seeks justice but ends up committing a crime herself and is sentenced to prison. The show explores themes of grief, guilt, and redemption.

== Cast and characters ==
=== Main ===
- Kim Nam-joo as Eun Soo-hyun

A successful and famous psychology professor and writer who loses her young son after he is hit by a car.

- Cha Eun-woo as Kwon Seon-yul

A mysterious person who grew up in a wealthy family, but lives a rough life after losing his parents due to a series of incidents.

- Kim Kang-woo as Kang Su-ho

Soo-hyun's husband who is a successful anchor.

- Im Se-mi as Han Yoo-ri

The representative of Cheongdam Select Shop, and Soo-hyun's former manager who is like a real sister to her.

=== Supporting ===
==== People around Soo-hyun ====
- Won Mi-kyung as Oh Go-eun

Soo-hyun's mother who is a restaurant owner.

- Kang Ae-sim as Jang Hyung-ja

Soo-hyun's fellow inmate who is a long-term prisoner serving a twenty-year sentence.

- Lee Jun as Kang Gun-woo

Soo-hyun and Su-ho's son.

==== People around Seon-yul ====
- Yang Hye-ji as Hong Su-jin

Seon-yul's best friend who has an easy-going and honest personality.

- Kim Woo-hyun as Park Yong-gu

Seon-yul's best friend and colleague.

==== People around Su-ho ====
- Jin Geon-woo as Kang Tae-ho

Su-ho's younger brother who is a neurosurgery resident.

- Gil Hae-yeon as Jung Myung-hee

Su-ho's mother.

- Sung Ji-ru as Han Sang

A former detective and owner of a jewelry store.

==== People around Yoo-ri ====
- Jo Yeon-hee as Mok Ryeon

She works at a bar and has a pretty cold attitude towards her daughter Han Yu-ri.

==== Others ====
- Park Hyuk-kwon as Kim Joon

Former mayor of Seoul and the current representative of Korean Union Party.

- Cha Soo-yeon as Yoon Hye-geum

Soo-hyun's neighbor and the director of Gold Gallery who lives with her son, who has epilepsy.

- Jin Jae-hee as Yoon Hee-jae

Hye-geum's son.

- Oh Man-seok as Gwon Ji-woong

CEO of a construction company.

- Lim Ji-sub as Gwon Min-hyuk

A person who lives a rough life and does anything for money.

- Lee Seon-hee as Jeong Jin-hee

A reporter.

- Jeon Hyun-ah as Kim Si-ra

A professor of psychology department.

=== Extended ===
- Kang Myung-joo as Kim Eun-min
- Kim Cheol-gi as Choi Joo-seok

A member of the National Assembly.

== Release ==
In November 2023, production company Samhwa Networks announced that it had signed a license contract with Walt Disney Korea for the broadcasting rights of the series.

== Reception ==
=== Critical response ===
Culture critic and Baeksang Arts Awards judge Jeong Deok-hyeon, writing for Ilgan Sports, praised the series for its profound focus on the "post-event" lives of victims. He noted that it effectively portrays the isolation of those whose time has stopped due to tragedy, while the rest of the world continues to move on indifferently, and emphasized the "wonderful" solidarity between characters who share similar wounds. He specifically lauded Cha Eun-woo's high-caliber range of expression in portraying Kwon Seon-yul, highlighting his exceptional ability to effectively convey the complex, layered emotions of a character navigating the duality of being both a victim and a potential perpetrator. Jeong noted that Cha captures the character's internal conflict with such precision that it makes Seon-yul’s dark and secretive nature feel "vividly human" and deeply grounded.

South Korean media outlets emphasized the powerful and sophisticated performances of the lead cast. Herald POP praised Kim Nam-joo's "passionate emotional acting," highlighting her ability to convey profound sorrow in scenes such as her character wailing at her son's grave after her release from prison. Writing for Sports Chosun, Moon Ji-yeon described Kim Nam-joo's portrayal as demonstrating "insane acting skills," citing the heart-wrenching scene of a mother wailing over her child's death and her decision to take direct action against the perpetrator. Moon described her performance as an "explosive and raw" portrayal of devastated motherhood, emphasizing her ability to sustain immense emotional tension throughout her pursuit of personal justice.

Moon Ji-yeon similarly praised Cha Eun-woo’s absolute immersion into the role, highlighting his expert portrayal of "unfiltered anger" and a "rough, unrefined lifestyle." She emphasized his mastery in handling physically demanding and high-tension scenes, labeling him a "breathtaking ending master" for his acting ability to command the screen and dictate the narrative’s tension through subtle facial shifts during pivotal cliffhangers. Meanwhile, Star Today noted that Cha's "intense eye acting" and natural charisma were central to the show's immersion. Critics highlighted his technical skill in using his gaze to communicate a spectrum of complex psychology—from a hollow desolation to sharp hostility—effectively telling the character's tragic backstory and hidden depth without the need for extensive dialogue.

Internationally, the lead performances were lauded for their weight and authenticity. Hidzir Junaini of NME commended Kim Nam-joo’s portrayal of Soo-hyun, calling it "powerful". Pierce Conran of the South China Morning Post described Cha Eun-woo’s portrayal as "gritty and raw," praising the "nuanced and melancholic" energy he brought to the screen while holding his own against Kim Nam-joo’s "towering" performance. Rolling Stone India further observed that his acting effectively captures "complex, layered emotions," proving his prowess as a dramatic actor in an atypical narrative. Reviewing for Bollywood Hungama, the series was described as an "intriguing" mystery thriller, adding that the lead actors carry the narrative with compelling performances that maintain tension through unpredictable twists.

The series received high ratings from the media. But Why Tho? awarded the opening episodes a 9.5/10, praising the "visceral and captivating" performances, while OTTplay gave the drama a 4/5 rating, stating that both lead actors "shine" in the emotionally charged thriller. It also maintained a high user rating of 9.0/10 on IMDb, attributing its popularity to a "solid narrative" and "flawless performances" that enhance the mystery elements. Furthermore, viewers on MyDramaList described the series as a "perfectly captivating" and "must-watch" masterpiece, highlighting its emotional depth and suspenseful storytelling.

=== Viewership ===
The series demonstrated a consistent upward trend in ratings throughout its broadcast, reaching a significant milestone toward its conclusion with double-digit viewership. It achieved its highest nationwide rating of 11.4%, with a peak of 12.7%, solidifying its position as the top-rated program across all networks on Fridays and breaking previous time-slot viewership records.

Wonderful World : South Korea viewers per episode (millions)

Season	Episode number														Average
Season	1	2	3	4	5	6	7	8	9	10	11	12	13	14	Average
1	0.934	1.116	1.448	1.225	1.619	1.310	1.446	1.070	1.811	1.456	1.919	1.176	1.904	1.585	1.430

Source: Audience measurement performed nationwide by Nielsen Korea.

Average TV viewership ratings
Ep.	Original broadcast date	Average audience share	
Ep.	Original broadcast date	Nielsen Korea	
Ep.	Original broadcast date	Nationwide	Seoul
1	March 1, 2024	5.3% (11th)	5.4% (9th)
2	March 2, 2024	6.1% (5th)	6.1% (4th)
3	March 8, 2024	8.0% (3rd)	8.0% (4th)
4	March 9, 2024	6.4% (5th)	6.2% (4th)
5	March 15, 2024	9.9% (2nd)	10.2% (1st)
6	March 16, 2024	7.3% (3rd)	7.0% (3rd)
7	March 22, 2024	8.5% (3rd)	8.3% (3rd)
8	March 23, 2024	6.3% (4th)	6.1% (3rd)
9	March 29, 2024	11.4% (1st)	11.7% (1st)
10	March 30, 2024	9.2% (2nd)	9.7% (2nd)
11	April 5, 2024	11.4% (1st)	11.2% (1st)
12	April 6, 2024	6.8% (2nd)	6.3% (2nd)
13	April 12, 2024	11.4% (1st)	11.6% (1st)
14	April 13, 2024	9.2% (2nd)	8.7% (2nd)
Average		8.4%	8.3%
In the table above, the blue numbers represent the lowest ratings and the red numbers represent the highest ratings.

=== Impact ===
Upon its premiere, Wonderful World demonstrated immediate market dominance by ranking first in the TV-OTT integrated drama topicality chart within its first week—achieving this after only two days of airing. Good Data Corporation also reported that the series topped the news, VON (Voice of Netizen), and overall topicality rankings across all television programs.

Its commercial success extended to digital platforms, leading OTT integrated rankings on Disney+ and Wavve, as reported by KinoLights. Within its first two episodes, the drama received an explosive reaction from viewers and broke its own time-slot records. Cha Eun-woo solidified his status as a "buzz icon," as video content showcasing his acting transformation surpassed 10 million cumulative views across various platforms. Additionally, he secured the top spot in the "drama search issue keywords" category, while the series itself and Kim Nam-joo ranked second and fifth, respectively.

The series also led Rankify's domestic drama trend index with 37,258 points. Analysis of viewership interest revealed that the drama attracted a predominantly female audience (71%), with balanced engagement across multiple age groups. The cast also dominated digital trends; Rankify's analysis on March 5 showed that lead actors Cha Eun-woo and Kim Nam-joo ranked first and second in the trend index for terrestrial drama cast members. Supporting actress Won Mi-kyung placed third, completing a sweep of the top three spots. Search data further showed that Cha attracted strong interest across all age groups, particularly among female viewers in their 30s and 40s.

Beyond ratings and online buzz, Wonderful World demonstrated cultural and commercial impact through its filming locations. The drama became a hot topic for featuring the wine bar "Noct", located within the Banpo-based cultural complex "The River", in episode 11. A scene between Eun Soo-hyun and her mother was filmed at the venue, highlighting its panoramic Han River night views and drawing viewer attention.

== Awards and nominations ==
Name of the award ceremony, year presented, category, nominee of the award, and the result of the nomination
Award ceremony	Year	Category	Nominee / Work	Result	Ref.
Asia Star Entertainer Awards	2025	Best Actor Award	Cha Eun-woo	Nominated	
Blue Dragon Awards	2024	Best Actor Award	Cha Eun-woo	Won	
Brand Customer Loyalty Awards (Note: Co-organized by the Korean Customers Council and Brand Keys, this event recognizes the most influential brands in society and culture, as determined through consumer research.)	2024	Hot Trend Male Actor	Cha Eun-woo	Won	
iMBC Awards (Note: iMBC Awards, hosted by iMBC Entertainment, MBC Group's only entertainment news outlet, honors artists and actors with outstanding achievements in the industry.)	2025	Best Actor Award	Cha Eun-woo	Won	
Korea Drama Awards	2024	Excellence Actor Award	Cha Eun-woo	Nominated	
MBC Drama Awards	2024	Grand Prize (Daesang)	Kim Nam-joo	Nominated	
MBC Drama Awards	2024	Drama of the Year	Wonderful World	Nominated	
MBC Drama Awards	2024	Top Excellence Award, Actor in a Miniseries	Cha Eun-woo	Nominated	
MBC Drama Awards	2024	Top Excellence Award, Actress in a Miniseries	Kim Nam-joo	Nominated	
MBC Drama Awards	2024	Best Acting Award, Actress	Kim Nam-joo	Won	
MBC Drama Awards	2024	Excellence Award, Actor in a Miniseries	Kim Kang-woo	Nominated	
MBC Drama Awards	2024	Excellence Award, Actress in a Miniseries	Im Se-mi	Nominated	
Seoul International Drama Awards	2024	Outstanding Asian Star - Korean Actor	Cha Eun-woo	Nominated	
Top Ten Awards (Note: Top Ten Awards, hosted by Ten Asia since 2018, is Korea's No. 1 global K-Pop awards show that honors the best global artists.)	2025	Best Actor Award	Cha Eun-woo	Won	

=== Listicles ===
Name of publisher, year listed, name of listicle, and placement
Publisher	Year	Listicle	Placement	Ref.
Elle Japan	2024	5 Best Korean Suspense Dramas of 2024	4th	
GQ India	2024	7 Best Thriller K-dramas of 2024	5th	
MovieWeb	2024	20 Best K-Dramas of 2024	1st	
Rolling Stone India	2024	10 Best K-Dramas of 2024	5th	
Screen Rant	2024	10 Best K-Dramas of 2024	5th	
Time	2024	10 Best K-Dramas of 2024	Honorable mention	
