= HiKR Ground =

Cultural center in Seoul, South Korea

HiKR Ground in 2026

HiKR Ground (based on "Hi!" + "KR" + Playground) is a tourist information and cultural center in Seoul, South Korea.

Opened in 2022, it is the public face of the Korea Tourism Organization, with a 4-storey interactive center with a K-Pop museum, and multi-lingual information desks.

The center is located in Jung, by the Cheonggyecheon stream.
