= Won Ji-an =

South Korean actress (born 1999)

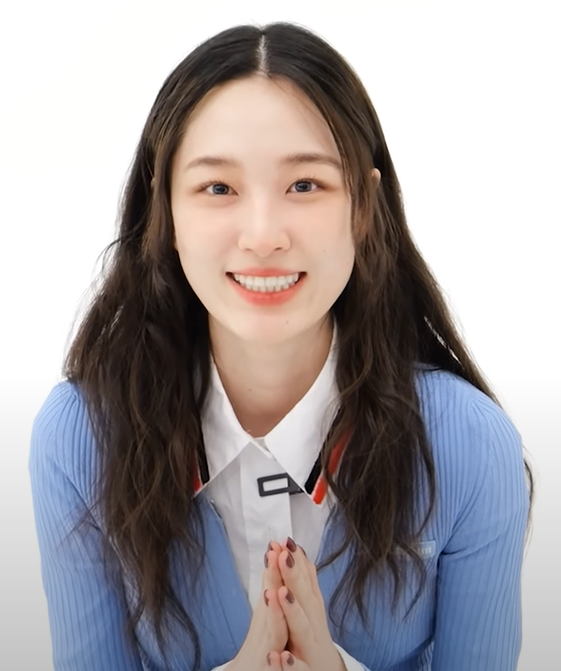
- Won in 2022
- Born: Kim In-seon; August 17, 1999 (age 27); Bucheon, South Korea
- Education: Korea National University of Arts
- Occupation: Actress
- Years active: 2021–present
- Agent: Hiin Entertainment
- Height: 170 cm (5 ft 7 in)

Korean name
- Hangul: 김인선
- RR: Gim Inseon
- MR: Kim Insŏn

Stage name
- Hangul: 원지안
- RR: Won Jian
- MR: Wŏn Chian
- Website: hiinent.com

Kim In-seon (Korean: 김인선; born August 17, 1999), better known by the stage name Won Ji-an (원지안), is a South Korean actress. She is best known for her roles in the dramas D.P. (2021–2023), Heartbeat (2023), and the second season of Squid Game (2024).

== Early life and education ==
Won Ji-an was born on August 17, 1999, with the name Kim In-seon in Bucheon, South Korea. She is currently attending Korea National University of Arts.

== Career ==
In 2024, Won starred in the second season of Squid Game and gained global attention for her role in the series. Won starred in the romance drama series Surely Tomorrow opposite Park Seo-joon which aired on JTBC in 2025.

== Filmography ==
=== Film ===
Year	Title	Role	Ref.
2021	A Year-End Medley	Lim Ah-young	

=== Television series ===
Year	Title	Role	Notes	Ref.
2021–2023	D.P.	Moon Young-ok	Recurring role (season 1); Cameo (season 2)	
2022	Hope or Dope	Kyung Da-jung	Season 1–2	
2022	If You Wish Upon Me	Ha Joon-kyung		
2023	Heartbeat	Joo In-hae		
2024–2025	Squid Game	Se-mi (Player 380)	Recurring role (season 2); Cameo (season 3)	
2025	Tempest	Kang Han-na		
2025	Surely Tomorrow	Seo Ji-woo		
2025–2026	Made in Korea	Choi Yu-ji / Yuji Ikeda		
TBA	Pleasant Bullying	Soo Hyun		

=== Music video appearances ===
Year	Song title	Artist	Ref.
2024	"The Story Behind" (그렇지 않아)	Kyuhyun	

== Awards and nominations ==
Award ceremony	Year	Category	Nominee / Work	Result	Ref.
Blue Dragon Series Awards	2022	Best New Actress	Hope or Dope	Nominated	
Director's Cut Awards	2022	Best New Actress (TV)	D.P.	Nominated	
KBS Drama Awards	2023	Best New Actress	Heartbeat	Nominated	
KBS Drama Awards	2022	Best Supporting Actress	If You Wish Upon Me	Nominated	
Korea First Brand Awards	2023	Best Rookie Actress	If You Wish Upon Me	Won	
