= Korea Tourism Organization =

Government agency of South Korea

- 한국관광공사
- Formation: 1962; 64 years ago
- Legal status: Statutory organization
- Affiliations: Ministry of Culture, Sports and Tourism
- Website: kto.visitkorea.or.kr/eng.kto

- Korea Tourism Organization
- Hangul: 한국관광공사
- Hanja: 韓國觀光公社
- RR: Hanguk gwangwang gongsa
- MR: Han'guk kwan'gwang kongsa

The Korea Tourism Organization (KTO; Korean: 한국관광공사) is an organization of the Republic of Korea (South Korea) under the Ministry of Culture, Sports and Tourism. It is commissioned to promote the country's tourism industry.

The KTO was established in 1962 as a government-invested corporation responsible for the South Korean tourism industry according to the International Tourism Corporation Act. The organization promotes Korea as a tourist destination to attract foreign tourists. Starting in the 1980s, domestic tourism promotion also became a function of the KTO.

Inbound visitors totaled over 6 million in 2006 and the tourism industry is said to be one of the factors that has some influence on the Korean economy.

== History ==
- 1961: The Tourism Promotion Law is enacted.
- 1962: The International Tourism Corporation (ITC) is established to promote South Korea’s tourism industry through the management of major hotels, taxis and the Korea Travel Bureau, as well as by training human resources to support the travel trade.
- 1968: The number of foreign visitors passes 100,000.
- 1969: The Hotel Institute is opened. The first overseas office opens in Tokyo.
- 1971: Development of Bomun Lake Resort in Gyeongju begins.
- 1977: London office opens in the UK.
- 1978: Korea attracts over one million foreign visitors.
- 1982: The International Tourism Corporation is renamed the Korea National Tourism Corporation (KNTC).
- 1988: The number of foreign visitors surpasses two million.
- 1991: The number of foreign visitors passes three million.
- 1996: The company's name is changed from Korea National Tourism Corporation to Korea National Tourism Organization.
- 1998: Kumgangsan Diamond Mountains tour begins.
- 2000: Korea attracts five million foreign visitors.
- 2003: Kumgangsan Diamond Mountains land route tour begins. Hallyu (Korea Wave) becomes the major theme of the KTO's overseas marketing. United States branch offices issue newsletter bulletins; offices are in Los Angeles and New York City.
- 2005: KTO reshuffles its organizational structure into six divisions. KTO introduces its new corporate identity. Korea attracts 6.5 million visitors from abroad.
- 2023: HiKR Ground tourism center opens in Seoul.

== Leadership ==
List of Officeholders
Generation	Name (Hangeul / Hanja)	Term of Office
1st	Shin Du-yeong (신두영 / 申斗泳)	April 30, 1962 – April 14, 1963
2nd	Lee Won-woo (이원우 / 李元雨)	April 15, 1963 – January 17, 1964
3rd	Oh Jae-kyung (오재경 / 吳在璟)	January 28, 1964 – June 11, 1965
4th	Kim Il-hwan (김일환 / 金一煥)	June 12, 1965 – March 23, 1970
5th	Jang Seong-hwan (장성환 / 張盛煥)	March 24, 1970 – January 28, 1971
6th	Ahn Dong-jun (안동준 / 安東濬)	June 17, 1971 – July 25, 1972
7th	Lee Han-rim (이한림 / 李翰林)	July 26, 1972 – January 28, 1974
8th	Kim Jwa-gyeom (김좌겸 / 金佐謙)	March 13, 1974 – March 12, 1980
9th	Hwang In-seong (황인성 / 黃寅性)	March 13, 1980 – December 2, 1980
10th	Ha Dae-don (하대돈 / 河大敦)	June 1, 1981 – October 15, 1986
11th	Lee Gye-ik (이계익 / 李啓謚)	April 2, 1986 – March 16, 1989
12th	Jo Young-gil (조영길 / 趙英吉)	March 17, 1989 – April 1, 1993
13th	Ji Yeon-tae (지연태)	April 2, 1993 – January 7, 1995
14th	Kim Tae-yeon (김태연 / 金泰淵)	January 9, 1995 – December 27, 1996
15th	Lee Gyeong-mun (이경문 / 李庚文)	December 28, 1996 – March 25, 1998
16th	Hong Du-pyo (홍두표 / 洪斗杓)	April 10, 1998 – June 3, 1999
17th	Lee Deok-ryeol (이득렬 / 李得洌)	June 26, 1999 – May 16, 2000
18th	Jo Hong-gyu (조홍규 / 趙洪奎)	June 1, 2000 – May 31, 2003
19th	Yu Geon (유건 / 柳健)	June 18, 2003 – January 14, 2005
20th	Kim Jong-min (김종민 / 金鍾民)	March 29, 2005 – May 8, 2007
21st	Oh Ji-cheol (오지철 / 吳志哲)	November 2, 2007 – May 30, 2009
22nd	Lee Cham (이참 / 李參)	July 30, 2009 – November 15, 2013
23rd	Byeon Chu-seok (변추석 / 卞秋錫)	April 4, 2014 – April 6, 2015
24th	Jeong Chang-su (정창수 / 鄭昌洙)	August 11, 2015 – January 19, 2018
Acting	Kang Ok-hee (강옥희)	January 20, 2018 – May 16, 2018
25th	An Young-bae (안영배 / 安榮培)	May 17, 2018 – May 26, 2022
Acting	Shin Sang-yong (신상용)	May 27, 2022 – October 7, 2022
26th	Kim Jang-sil (김장실 / 金長實)	October 7, 2022 – January 12, 2024
Acting	Seo Young-chung (서영충)	January 12, 2024 – Present

== Honorary ambassadors ==
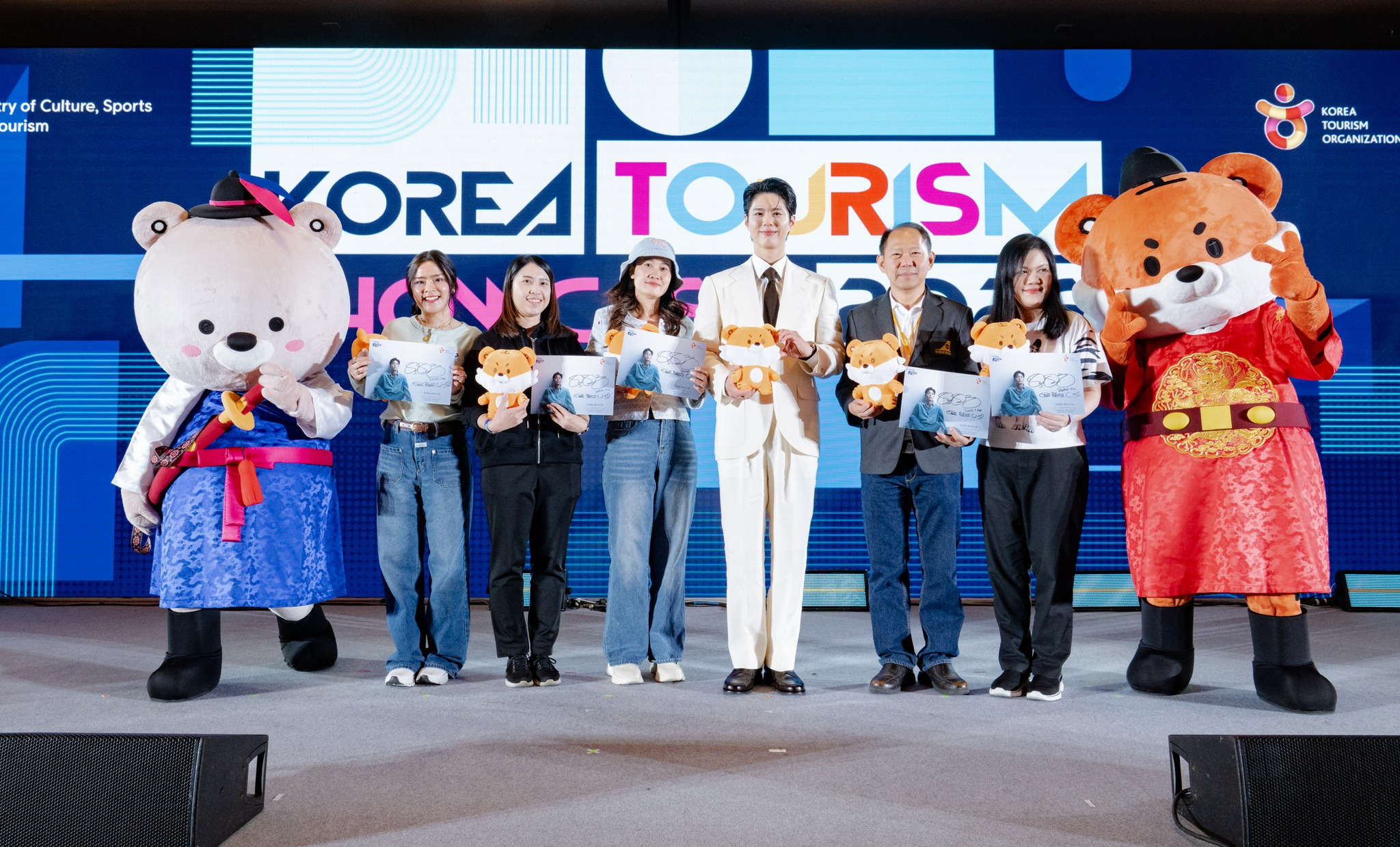
Actor Park Bo-gum (center) with hallyu fans at a tourism event in Bangkok

KTO appoints globally-known South Korean figures as honorary ambassadors for their annual campaigns. They have included:

- BTS, boy group (2022)
- Lee Jung-jae, actor (2023)
- NewJeans, girl group (2024)
- Park Bo-gum, actor (2025)

Separate from the annual campaigns, Cha Eun-woo was appointed as the honorary ambassador for the "2023–2024 Visit Korea Year", a national tourism initiative. In this capacity, he participated in the launching ceremony of the K-Tourism Cooperation Group alongside then-First Lady Kim Keon-hee and Chairperson Lee Boo-jin.

== See also ==
- Seoul Tourism Organization
