= Heartbeat (South Korean TV series) =

2023 South Korean television series

- Promotional poster
- Hangul: 가슴이 뛴다
- Lit.: My Heart Is Beating
- RR: Gaseumi ttwinda
- MR: Kasŭmi ttwinda
- Genre: Fantasy; Romantic comedy
- Written by: Kim Ha-na; Jung Seung-joo
- Directed by: Lee Hyun-seok; Lee Min-soo
- Starring: Ok Taec-yeon; Won Ji-an; Kang-hyun Park; Yoon So-hee
- Music by: Gaemi
- Country of origin: South Korea
- Original language: Korean
- No. of episodes: 16

Production
- Executive producer: Ki Min-soo
- Producers: Lee Hyun-wook; Kim Hyung-jun
- Running time: 70 minutes
- Production companies: WeMad; Monster Union

Original release
- Network: KBS2
- Release: June 26 – August 15, 2023

Heartbeat (Korean: 가슴이 뛴다) is a 2023 South Korean television series starring Ok Taec-yeon, Won Ji-an, Kang-hyun Park, and Yoon So-hee. It aired on KBS2 from June 26 to August 15, 2023, every Monday and Tuesday at 21:45 (KST). It is also available for streaming on Amazon Prime Video in selected regions.

== Synopsis ==
Half-human and half-vampire Seon Woo-hyul (Ok Taec-yeon) somehow starts to live together with coldhearted woman Joo In-hae (Won Ji-an). The two fall in love with each other, bringing warmth into their lives.

== Cast and characters ==
=== Main ===
- Ok Taec-yeon as Seon Woo-hyul: a half-human and half-vampire who had failed to become human due to a one-day difference in 100 years.
- Won Ji-an as Joo In-hae: a part-time high school nurse and owner of a guesthouse.
- Kang-hyun Park as Shin Do-sik: a real estate development specialist and In-hae's college classmate.
- Yoon So-hee as Yoon Hae-seon / Na Hae-won
1. Yoon Hae-seon: a member of an aristocratic family during the Joseon period. Woo-hyul's first love.
2. Na Hae-won: a real estate investor.

=== Supporting ===
==== Vampires around Woo-hyul ====
- Yoon Byung-hee as Lee Sang-hae: a vampire and a tarot master.
- Ko Kyu-pil as Park Dong-seop: a self-employed vampire who runs a snack bar in front of a high school.
- Moon Seung-you as Rose: a vampire and a dancer who has a bright and positive personality.
- Baek Seo-hoo as Ri Man-hwi: a worldly vampire.

==== People in the neighborhood ====
- Baek Hyun-joo as Go Ki-suk: a local butcher who runs a butcher shop near Woo-hyul's mansion.
- Jung Young-ki as Kim Gwang-ok: owner of a tailor shop.
- Kim Do-geon as Kim Min-jae: Gwang-ok's son.

==== Others ====
- Kim In-kwon as Go Yang-nam: the person who has taught Woo-hyul how to become a human.
- Ham Tae-in as Chief Goo: Do-sik's secretary.
- Seo Hyun-cheol as Joo Dong-il: In-hae's father.
- Park Chul-min as Butler Joo: first generation of a butler family.

=== Extended ===
- Kim Ba-da as General Shin: a vampire hunter who knows the true identity of Woo-hyul.
- Kim Hyun-joon as a fraudster
- Seo Jun as Hyang-geun
- Jang Seo-yeon as Hwang So-yi: the first guest at In-hae's guesthouse.

== Music ==
Heartbeat OST

== Viewership ==
Heartbeat : South Korea viewers per episode (thousands)

| Season | Episode number | | | | | | | | | | | | | | | |
| Season | 1 | 2 | 3 | 4 | 5 | 6 | 7 | 8 | 9 | 10 | 11 | 12 | 13 | 14 | 15 | 16 |
|---|---|---|---|---|---|---|---|---|---|---|---|---|---|---|---|---|
| 1 | 686 | 632 | 586 | 619 | N/A | 541 | N/A | 521 | N/A | N/A | N/A | N/A | N/A | N/A | N/A | 495 |

Source: Audience measurement performed nationwide by Nielsen Korea.

Average TV viewership ratings
| Ep. | Original broadcast date | Average audience share | | |
| Ep. | Original broadcast date | Nielsen Korea | | TNmS |
| Ep. | Original broadcast date | Nationwide | Seoul | Nationwide |
|---|---|---|---|---|
| 1 | June 26, 2023 | 4.1% (17th) | 4.1% (13th) | N/A |
| 2 | June 27, 2023 | 3.5% (14th) | 3.7% (9th) | 3.7% (16th) |
| 3 | July 3, 2023 | 3.3% (20th) | 3.2% (17th) | N/A |
| 4 | July 4, 2023 | 3.6% (15th) | 4.0% (11th) | N/A |
| 5 | July 10, 2023 | 2.8% (23rd) | 2.7% (19th) | N/A |
| 6 | July 11, 2023 | 3.1% (17th) | 3.1% (15th) | N/A |
| 7 | July 17, 2023 | 2.9% (22nd) | 3.0% (19th) | N/A |
| 8 | July 18, 2023 | 2.8% (22nd) | 2.8% (20th) | N/A |
| 9 | July 24, 2023 | 2.3% (28th) | N/A | N/A |
| 10 | July 25, 2023 | 2.5% (23rd) | 2.9% (18th) | N/A |
| 11 | July 31, 2023 | 1.9% (31st) | N/A | N/A |
| 12 | August 1, 2023 | 2.4% (25th) | N/A | N/A |
| 13 | August 7, 2023 | 2.0% (32nd) | N/A | N/A |
| 14 | August 8, 2023 | 2.1% (30th) | N/A | N/A |
| 15 | August 14, 2023 | 2.6% (23rd) | 3.1% (18th) | N/A |
| 16 | August 15, 2023 | 3.0% (19th) | 3.1% (14th) | N/A |
| Average | | 2.8% | — (Note: Due to multiple unpublished ratings, the exact average rating is unknown.) | — |
In the table above, the blue numbers represent the lowest ratings and the red numbers represent the highest ratings.; N/A denotes ratings that were not published.

== Awards and nominations ==
Name of the award ceremony, year presented, category, nominee of the award, and the result of the nomination
| Award ceremony | Year | Category | Nominee | Result | Ref. |
|---|---|---|---|---|---|
| Korea Drama Awards | 2023 | Hot Star Award | Ko Kyu-pil | Won | |
