= Surely Tomorrow =

2025 South Korean television series

- Promotional poster
- Hangul: 경도를 기다리며
- Lit.: Waiting for Gyeongdo
- RR: Gyeongdoreul gidarimyeo
- MR: Kyŏngdorŭl kidarimyŏ
- Genre: Romance
- Written by: Yoo Young-ah
- Directed by: Lim Hyun-wook
- Starring: Park Seo-joon; Won Ji-an
- Music by: Jeong Se-rin (CP)
- Country of origin: South Korea
- Original language: Korean
- No. of episodes: 12

Production
- Running time: 70 minutes
- Production companies: SLL; Story Forest; Studios IN

Original release
- Network: JTBC
- Release: December 6, 2025 – January 11, 2026

Surely Tomorrow (Korean: 경도를 기다리며) is a 2025-26 South Korean television series directed by Lim Hyun-wook, written by Yoo Young-ah, and starring Park Seo-joon and Won Ji-an. It aired on JTBC from December 6, 2025, to January 11, 2026 every Saturday and Sunday at 22:40 (KST). It is also available to stream on Prime Video in select territories around the world.

== Synopsis ==
Lee Gyeong-do is a reporter for Dongwoon Ilbo, and has been living an ordinary life, until he reconnects with his ex-girlfriend, Seo Ji-woo, who was the wife of a husband involved in an extramarital affair scandal, that Gyeong-do reported.

== Cast and characters ==
=== Main ===
- Park Seo-joon as Lee Gyeong-do

A reporter of Dongwoon Ilbo.

- Won Ji-an as Seo Ji-woo

Gyeong-do's ex-girlfriend.

=== Supporting ===
- Lee El as Seo Ji-yeon

Ji-woo's elder sister, and the CEO of Jarim Apparel.

- Lee Joo-young as Park Se-young

The director of an art school, and is friends with Gyeong-do and Ji-woo.

- Kang Ki-doong as Cha Woo-sik

Se-young's husband who dreams of becoming an actor.

- Jo Min-gook as Lee Jung-min

A used cars dealer.

- Nam Gi-ae as Jang Hyun-kyung

Ji-woo and Ji-yeon's mother.

- Kang Mal-geum as Jin Han-kyung

Editor at the entertainment department.

- Kim Mi-kyung as Jo Nam-sook

Gyeong-do's mother.

- Jeong Ha-jin as Nam Bo-ra

An intern reporter at the entertainment department.

=== Special appearances ===
- Go Bo-gyeol as An Dae-hye
- Kim Ji-woong as Oh Goon

A college student who possesses extraordinary abilities in gathering information.

- Kim Sung-kyun as amusement park owner

== Production ==
=== Development ===
Surely Tomorrow is directed by Im Hyun-wook, known for his work on Reflection of You (2021) and King the Land (2023), and written by Yoo Yeon-ga, who wrote Encounter (2018-19), Thirty-Nine (2022), and Divorce Attorney Shin (2023). It is co-produced by SLL, Story Forest, and Studios IN.

=== Casting ===
Park Seo-joon was reportedly offered the role as the male lead on July 8, 2024.

In January 2025, Won Ji-an and Park were reportedly confirmed to appear as the lead.

== Release ==
On May 27, 2025, JTBC revealed the drama lineup for the second half. It premiered on JTBC on December 6, 2025, and airs every Saturday and Sunday at 22:40 (KST).

== Viewership ==
Surely Tomorrow : South Korea viewers per episode (thousands)

Season	Episode number												Average
Season	1	2	3	4	5	6	7	8	9	10	11	12	Average
1	650	807	707	1009	822	875	800	986	807	981	812	1109	864

Source: Audience measurement performed nationwide by Nielsen Korea.

Average TV viewership ratings
Ep.	Original broadcast date	Average audience share (Nielsen Korea)	
Ep.	Original broadcast date	Nationwide	Seoul
1	December 6, 2025	2.721% (1st)	2.946% (1st)
2	December 7, 2025	3.295% (1st)	3.609% (1st)
3	December 13, 2025	3.063% (1st)	3.091% (1st)
4	December 14, 2025	3.888% (1st)	3.696% (1st)
5	December 20, 2025	3.270% (3rd)	2.999% (1st)
6	December 21, 2025	3.425% (2nd)	3.027% (1st)
7	December 27, 2025	3.259% (3rd)	3.515% (1st)
8	December 28, 2025	4.150% (1st)	4.351% (1st)
9	January 3, 2026	3.266% (1st)	2.965% (1st)
10	January 4, 2026	3.793% (1st)	3.956% (1st)
11	January 10, 2026	3.350% (1st)	3.572% (1st)
12	January 11, 2026	4.728% (1st)	4.741% (1st)
Average		3.517%	3.539%
In the table above, the blue numbers represent the lowest ratings and the red numbers represent the highest ratings.; This series aired on a cable channel/pay TV which normally has a relatively smaller audience compared to free-to-air TV/public broadcasters (KBS, SBS, MBC, and EBS).
