= Entity (EP) =

- Digital cover

EP by Cha Eun-woo
- Released: February 15, 2024
- Genre: K-pop
- Length: 16:18
- Languages: Korean; English
- Label: Fantagio Music

Singles from Entity
- 1. "Stay" Released: February 15, 2024

Entity is the debut extended play (EP) by South Korean singer and actor Cha Eun-woo of the boy band Astro. It was released on February 15, 2024, by Fantagio. The EP contains six tracks, including the lead single "Stay".

== Commercial performance ==
The EP sold 217,295 copies in South Korea and 4,450 in Japan in its first week. It peaked at number 2 on the Circle Album Chart and number 15 on the Japanese Oricon Albums Chart.

== Track listing ==
Entity track listing
No.	Title	Length
1.	"U&I" (너와 단둘이)	3:34
2.	"Fu*king Great Time"	3:05
3.	"Stay"	2:54
4.	"Where Am I"	3:38
5.	"You're the Best"	3:07
6.	"Memories" (CD bonus track)	3:31
Total length:		16:18

== Charts ==
=== Weekly charts ===
Weekly chart performance for Entity
Chart (2024)	Peak position
Japanese Albums (Oricon)	15
South Korean Albums (Circle)	2

=== Monthly charts ===
Monthly chart performance for Entity
Chart (2024)	Peak position
South Korean Albums (Circle)	10
