= Miss Night and Day =

2024 South Korean television series

- Promotional poster
- Hangul: 낮과 밤이 다른 그녀
- Lit.: She's Different from Night to Day
- RR: Natgwa bami dareun geunyeo
- MR: Natkwa pami tarŭn kŭnyŏ
- Genre: Romantic comedy; Fantasy; Mystery
- Written by: Park Ji-ha
- Directed by: Lee Hyeong-min; Choi Sun-min
- Starring: Lee Jung-eun; Jung Eun-ji; Choi Jin-hyuk
- Music by: Jeong Yae-kyung
- Country of origin: South Korea
- Original language: Korean
- No. of episodes: 16

Production
- Running time: 65–70 minutes
- Production companies: Samhwa Networks; SLL

Original release
- Network: JTBC
- Release: June 15 – August 4, 2024

Miss Night and Day (Korean: 낮과 밤이 다른 그녀) is a 2024 South Korean drama starring Lee Jung-eun, Jung Eun-ji, and Choi Jin-hyuk. It aired on JTBC from June 15, to August 4, 2024, every Saturday and Sunday at 22:30 (KST). It is also available for streaming on Netflix in selected regions.

== Synopsis ==
Miss Night and Day tells the story about a job seeker who is suddenly stuck in middle age one day and a prosecutor who is caught up in her all the time. Lim Sun, a woman in her 50s, is a secondary character to Lee Mi-jin, who goes to work as a public intern when the sun rises.

== Cast and characters ==
=== Main ===
- Lee Jung-eun as Lim Soon / old Lee Mi-jin, a 48-year-old woman working for Seohan District Prosecutors' Office as an intern when the sun rises.
- Jung Eun-ji as Lee Mi-jin, a 28-year-old job seeker who suddenly turns 20 years older everyday when the sun sets.
- Choi Jin-hyuk as Gye Ji-woong, a workaholic prosecutor who recently transferred to Seohan District Prosecutors' Office.
- Baek Seo-hoo as Ko-won, a member of South Korea's top idol group, Kingland, who was recently conscripted into the military.

=== Supporting ===
==== People around Mi-jin ====
- Kim Ah-young as Do Ga-young, Mijin's best friend who is a beauty YouTuber.
- Jung Young-joo as Im Chung, Mi-jin's mother.
- Jung Suk-yong as Lee Hak-chan, Mijin's father.
- Ahn Sang-woo as Do Pyeon-gang, Ga-young's father who is a real estate agent.

==== Seohan District Prosecutors' Office ====
- Yoon Byung-hee as Joo Byeong-duk
- Moon Ye-won as Tak Cheon-hee
- Kim Gwang-sik as Cha Jae-sung
- Kim Mi-ran as Woo-yeon
- Choi Moo-in as Seo Mal-tae, a former cop and one of the older people hired with Im Soon to be a cleaning person in the prosecutor office
- Kim Jae-rok as Geum Gwang-suk, one of the older people hired with "Lim Soon" to be a cleaning person in the prosecutor office
- Bae Hae-sun as Na Ok-hee, a "nepotism hire" and one of the older people hired with "Lim Soon" to be a cleaning person in the prosecutor office
- Choi Beom-ho as Go Na-heun, a "disability hire" and one of the older people hired with Im Soon to be a cleaning person in the prosecutor office. He disappears after Episode 2.
- Jung Jae-sung as Baek Chul-gyu, former director of Hwadong Medical Center, who – much to the mystification of the other old folks – is also hired to be an intern in the prosecutor office, replacing Go Na-heun.

== Reception ==
Singaporean national newspaper The Straits Times gave the series three out of five stars, describing the drama as a "delightfully unhinged mash-up of romcom, criminal procedural and supernatural fantasy", praising the character and plot development and its touch on ageism, creating the empathy of fearing to age. Time also gave the series a positive review, praising the series for combining the serial killer plotline with the "slice-of-life" and farcical romance genres.

Lead actress Jung Eun-ji described the drama as one which held a special place in her heart, and she "occasionally struggled to relate" to her character Mi-jin, but many could empathize with the struggles of her character. Jung said she realized that everyone has their own pace in life through her character and all deserved respect for their different paces in life. The finale of Miss Night and Day achieved the series's highest viewership rating of 11.7 percent, marking the highest for any JTBC drama aired in 2024 so far.

=== Viewership ===
Miss Night and Day : South Korea viewers per episode (millions)

Season	Episode number																Average
Season	1	2	3	4	5	6	7	8	9	10	11	12	13	14	15	16	Average
1	0.958	0.860	1.072	1.479	1.367	1.746	1.364	1.926	1.808	1.986	1.618	2.219	1.893	1.968	2.118	2.815	1.700

Source: Audience measurement performed nationwide by Nielsen Korea.

Average TV viewership ratings
Ep.	Original broadcast date	Average audience share (Nielsen Korea)	
Ep.	Original broadcast date	Nationwide	Seoul
1	June 15, 2024	3.998% (2nd)	4.600% (1st)
2	June 16, 2024	3.602% (3rd)	3.783% (3rd)
3	June 22, 2024	4.457% (1st)	4.916% (1st)
4	June 23, 2024	6.037% (1st)	6.338% (1st)
5	June 29, 2024	6.154% (1st)	6.873% (1st)
6	June 30, 2024	7.666% (1st)	8.218% (1st)
7	July 6, 2024	5.719% (1st)	6.157% (1st)
8	July 7, 2024	8.391% (1st)	9.056% (1st)
9	July 13, 2024	7.473% (1st)	7.397% (1st)
10	July 14, 2024	8.376% (1st)	8.693% (1st)
11	July 20, 2024	7.101% (1st)	6.729% (1st)
12	July 21, 2024	9.368% (1st)	9.423% (1st)
13	July 27, 2024	7.943% (1st)	8.137% (1st)
14	July 28, 2024	8.287% (1st)	8.277% (1st)
15	August 3, 2024	8.707% (1st)	8.618% (1st)
16	August 4, 2024	11.744% (1st)	12.092% (1st)
Average		7.189%	7.457%
In the table above, the blue numbers represent the lowest ratings and the red numbers represent the highest ratings.; This drama aired on a cable channel/pay TV which normally has a relatively smaller audience compared to free-to-air TV/public broadcasters (KBS, SBS, MBC, and EBS).

=== Accolades ===
Award ceremony	Year	Category	Nominee	Result	Ref.
Bechdel Day	2025	Bechdel Choice 10	Miss Night and Day	Placed	
