= Seoul Tourism Organization =

The Seoul Tourism Organization (STO; Korean: 서울관광재단) is a public interest corporation established by local governments in Seoul, South Korea. It is also known as the Seoul Tourism Foundation. The organization was established on May 1, 2018. The purpose of the organization is to make Seoul an international tourist city. It is linked with Korea Tourism Organization.

The Seoul Tourism Foundation converted the existing 'MICE Comprehensive Support Center' into a 'Corona 19 Emergency Response Center' to support the emergency prevention of COVID-19 in South Korea.

The organization works with the Seoul Metropolitan Government to support the Seoul MICE Alliance, a network of businesses and organizations involved in meetings, incentives, conventions, and exhibitions.

== Background ==
=== Overview ===
- Increased happiness of domestic tourist and foreigners
- Realization of happy life tourism for tourist and citizens
- Discover unique tourist contents and make unique tourist spots in Seoul
- Strengthening ecotourism support
- Sustainable ecotourism support and industry capacity building
- Expansion of tourism governance at home and abroad
- Expansion of the added value of Seoul tourism
- Strengthening the role and capacity of public institutions
- Expansion of organizational culture of communication and collaboration
- Foundation for organizational innovation through change

=== Roles ===
Tourism product and resource development Seoul's official experience tourism content portal site, Onemore Trip Seoul Tour Free Pass Discover Seoul Patt Hallyu tourism

- Excellent Tourism Product Certification System
- Activation of alternative accommodation

Seoul walking tour with cultural tourism guide Tourist Information and Services

- Seoul Official Tourist Information Site-Visit Seoul.net
- The organization also operates Seoul Danurim, an accessible tourism service designed to help visitors with different accessibility needs explore Seoul.

Tourist Information Center Seoul tour guide and map Seoul 7017 Tourist Facilities

- Festivals and events

Seoul Fair Tourism International Forum Seoul Summer Sale Seoul Lantern Festival

- Overseas PR Marketing

Overseas briefing sessions and trade fair participation Vitalization of Medical Tourism

In 2026, the organization recruited 150 foreign residents of South Korea for its Global Seoul Mate program, which promotes Seoul through social media content about local attractions and events.

== Honorary ambassadors ==
- Jennie, singer (2025)

== See also ==
- Korea Tourism Organization
- Outline of South Korea
