= The Financial News =

South Korean daily newspaper

The Financial News (Korean: 파이낸셜뉴스) is a South Korean daily newspaper. The newspaper's motto is "First-Class financial paper". Kwon Seong Cheol, an alumnus of Seoul National University, was appointed president of the paper in 2010. A new president was appointed in March 2021.
