= Brand Keys =

Brand Keys, Inc.
- Type: Privately held company
- Industry: Research Consultancy, Media, Advertising, Public Relations, Entertainment, Retail, Wholesale, Fashion
- Founded: 1984
- Headquarters: New York, United States
- Key people: Robert K. Passikoff, Ph.D., Founder and President; Leigh Benatar, EVP
- Products: Predictive Brand Equity, Loyalty, and Engagement Metrics, Traditional Market Research, Communications Research, Media Testing, Brand-to-Media Engagement(B2ME), Business-to-Business (B2B), Business-to-Consumer (B2C),
- Website: www.brandkeys.com

Brand Keys is a brand research consultancy specializing in predictive consumer behavioral brand equity, loyalty, and engagement metrics. Brand Keys is headquartered in New York, NY and has offices in Dublin, Dubai, London, Madrid, Sydney, and Tokyo.

== Overview ==
=== History ===
Robert Passikoff founded Brand Keys in 1984 and developed the consumer listening system to show measures of brand equity. The approach identifies what motivates, maintains, reinforces, and drives consideration, engagement, purchase behavior, and consumer loyalty.

=== Methodologies ===
Research conducted by the Advertising Research Foundation indicated that the methodological framework utilized by Brand Keys is the most successful at predicting sales and subsequent changes in real-world consumer behavior. The Advertising Research Foundation also independently validated these assessments via their "First Opinion" Review.

== See also ==
- Brand loyalty
- Consumer behaviour
- Customer engagement
