= Doctor Stranger =

2014 South Korean TV series

- Promotional poster
- Genre: Medical; Romance
- Written by: Park Jin-woo; Kim Joo
- Directed by: Jin Hyuk; Hong Jong-chan
- Starring: Lee Jong-suk; Jin Se-yeon; Park Hae-jin; Kang So-ra
- Composer: Kim Jang-woo
- Country of origin: South Korea
- Original language: Korean
- No. of seasons: 1
- No. of episodes: 20

Production
- Executive producers: Han Jung-hwan; Koh Dae-hwa; Lim Sung-gyun
- Producer: Park Chang-yong
- Production locations: Seoul, South Korea; Budapest, Hungary
- Running time: Mondays and Tuesdays at 21:55 (KST)
- Production company: Aura Media

Original release
- Network: Seoul Broadcasting System
- Release: May 5 – July 8, 2014

Doctor Stranger (Korean: 닥터 이방인; RR: Dakteo ibangin) is a 2014 South Korean television series starring Lee Jong-suk, Jin Se-yeon, Park Hae-jin and Kang So-ra. It aired on SBS from May 5 to July 8, 2014 on Mondays and Tuesdays at 21:55 KST (UTC+9) for 20 episodes.

== Synopsis ==
As a child, Park Hoon (Lee Jong-suk) and his father Park Cheol, a well-known surgeon (Kim Sang-joong) were sent to North Korea to conduct an open-heart surgery on Kim Il Sung to prevent the Second Korean War. After being sent to North Korea, Park Hoon and his father were denied access to go back to South Korea. It is revealed that Park Cheol is suing the Myungwoo University Hospital for a serious malpractice case and Park Cheol's friend, Dr Park Choi wanted to take responsibility. However, the director of the Hospital Oh did not want the malpractice case to become public which will ruin the hospital's reputation. As a result, he conspired with Jang Seok-joo, a national security official to make Park Cheol and his son trapped in North Korea. In North Korea, Park Hoon was trained to become a doctor by his father who was already a famous doctor. He became a genius cardiothoracic surgeon after attending medical school in North Korea while moonlighting as a smuggler, selling South Korean K-pop DVD. There, he fell deeply in love with Song Jae-hee (Jin Se-yeon). After Park Hoon's father died, he tried to flee to South Korea with Jae-hee, but lost contact with her in the end. Park Hoon was able to flee to South Korea alone.

In South Korea, Park Hoon begins to work as doctor in a top hospital, Myungwoo University Hospital. Meanwhile, he found a girl that looks exactly like Jae-hee, Doctor Han Seung-hee, who claims not to know Park Hoon. At the same time, Lee Sung-hoon, a leading doctor in the hospital plans his revenge against the institution for the death of his father in the malpractice case 10 years ago.

== Cast ==
=== Main ===
- Lee Jong-suk as Park Hoon 박훈
  - Goo Seung-hyun as young Park Hoon

A South Korean who was raised in North Korea after his father was conned into going over to North. He trained to be a genius doctor in North Korea, and later defected to South Korea in a bid to live a better life with his lover.

- Jin Se-yeon as Song Jae-hee 송재희/Han Seung-hee한승희
  - Seo Ji-hee as young Song Jae-hee

Jae-hee is Park Hoon's soul mate who was separated from him while they were escaping from North Korea; Seung-hee is a North Korean woman and a specialist in oriental medicine anesthesia.

- Park Hae-jin as Han Jae-joon 한재준/ Lee Sung-hoon 이성훈
  - Kim Ji-hoon as young Lee Sung-hoon

A genius who graduated from Harvard and became a doctor to take revenge on Myungwoo Hospital for the death of his father in a malpractice case, as Park Hoon's rival.

- Kang So-ra as Oh Soo-hyun 오수현
  - Shin Soo-yeon as young Oh Soo-hyun

Daughter of the chairman of Myungwoo Hospital, a cardiothoracic surgeon

=== Supporting ===
- Park Hae-joon as Cha Jin-soo (North Korean agent)
- Chun Ho-jin as Prime Minister Jang Seok-joo, the primary antagonist of the series.
- Jeon Gook-hwan as Oh Joon-gyu (Soo-hyun's father and chairman of the Myungwoo Hospital), he is the major antagonist of the series as he responsible for deporting Dr Cheol and his son to North Korea in the first place.
- Choi Jung-woo as Moon Hyung-wook
- Nam Myung-ryul as Choi Byeong-cheol
- Yoon Bo-ra as Lee Chang-yi
- Kim Sang-ho as Yang Jeong-han
- Hwang Dong-joo as Geum Bong-hyun
- Kang Tae-hwan as Oh Sang-jin
- Lee Jae Won as Kim Chi-gyu
- Kim Bo-mi as Kim Ah-young (Chi-gyu's younger sister)
- Uhm Soo-jung as Min Soo-ji
- Han Eun-sun as Eun Min-se
- Jung In-gi as Kim Tae-sool
- Kim Ji-eun as Joon-gyu's secretary
- Kim Yong-gun as President Hong Chan-sang
- Kim Ji-young as Jeong-min
- Kim Sang-joong as Park Cheol (Park Hoon's father)
- Zhang Liang as Sean Zhang (Jae-joon's friend)
- Jung Hye-in as Nurse

== Original soundtrack ==
Doctor Stranger OST

Soundtrack album by Various artists
- Recorded: 2014
- Genre: Soundtrack
- Language: Korean; English
- Label: Yedang C&S; Well-Made Yedang

=== Part 1 ===
Released on May 7, 2014
No.	Title	Artist	Length
1.	"Stranger" (이방인)	Bobby Kim	3:42

=== Part 2 ===
Released on May 19, 2014
No.	Title	Artist	Length
1.	"Meet You Know" (지금만나러가요)	Lee Ki-chan	4:05
2.	"Meet You Know" (Inst.)		4:05
Total length:			8:01

=== Part 3 ===
Released on May 20, 2014
No.	Title	Artist	Length
1.	"A Good Day Like This" (이렇게좋은날)	Jeon Hye-won	3:36
2.	"A Good Day Like This" (Inst.)		3:36
Total length:			7:32

=== Part 4 ===
Released on June 3, 2014
No.	Title	Artist	Length
1.	"As If Tomorrow Won't Come" (내일이안오것처럼)	G.O (MBLAQ)	3:50
2.	"As If Tomorrow Won't Come" (Inst.)		3:50
Total length:			7:00

=== Part 5 ===
Released on June 9, 2014
No.	Title	Artist	Length
1.	"You and I" (니가내가)	Bang Min-ah (Girl's Day)	2:50
2.	"You and I" (Inst.)		2:50
Total length:			5:10

=== Part 6 ===
Released on June 16, 2014
No.	Title	Artist	Length
1.	"Because of You" (당신때문에)	Park Jung-ah	3:28
2.	"Because of You" (Inst.)		3:28
Total length:			7:56

Disc 2:
No.	Title	Artist	Length
1.	"I Am a Stranger" (Opening Title)	Kim Jang Woo	3:20
2.	"Dangerous Guys"	Kim Jang Woo	3:00
3.	"Escape"	Kim Jang Woo	3:35
4.	"G.R.B"	Kim Jang Woo	3:30
5.	"Memory"	Kim Jang Woo	4:45
6.	"New Life"	Kim Jang Woo	2:40
7.	"Promise"	Kim Jang Woo	3:10
8.	"Team Strangers"	Kim Jang Woo	3:40
9.	"The Meaning of Tears"	Kim Jang Woo	3:50
10.	"Right Way"	Kim Jang Woo	4:59

== Production and broadcast ==
Director Jin Hyuk previously directed Brilliant Legacy (2009), City Hunter (2011), Master's Sun (2013). Co-screenwriter Park Jin-woo previously wrote Conspiracy in the Court (2007) and The Kingdom of the Winds (2008).

In China, the online streaming rights for drama were sold for $80,000 per episode. The drama was made available for online streaming on both Youku and Tudou where it received 330 million and 50 million views, respectively. As of July 7, 2014, it has been streamed close to 400 million times. Due to the drama's success in China, there were plans to edit the drama into a film and release it theatrically exclusively in China with an alternate ending. According to the website DailyNK, which reports on North Korea-related issues, the drama was highly popular among North Korean youth who would obtain it illegally at the jangmadang (markets).

== Ratings ==
Ep.	Original broadcast date	Average audience share			
Ep.	Original broadcast date	Nielsen Korea		TNmS	
Ep.	Original broadcast date	Nationwide	Seoul	Nationwide	Seoul
1	May 5, 2014	8.6%	9.5%	9.4%	11.6%
2	May 6, 2014	9.4%	9.9%	11.3%	13.7%
3	May 12, 2014	12.1%	13.3%	11.6%	13.6%
4	May 13, 2014	12.7%	13.3%	13.1%	16.2%
5	May 19, 2014	14.0%	15.6%	14.2%	18.1%
6	May 20, 2014	12.7%	14.3%	12.1%	15.9%
7	May 26, 2014	13.1%	14.8%	12.8%	15.8%
8	May 27, 2014	12.5%	14.1%	12.3%	15.1%
9	June 2, 2014	13.2%	14.7%	13.0%	16.1%
10	June 3, 2014	11.7%	12.9%	12.0%	14.8%
11	June 9, 2014	11.0%	12.4%	10.7%	13.5%
12	June 10, 2014	11.5%	12.7%	11.1%	14.1%
13	June 16, 2014	11.6%	13.1%	11.4%	13.6%
14	June 17, 2014	10.8%	12.3%	11.5%	13.6%
15	June 23, 2014	11.9%	13.6%	12.4%	15.2%
16	June 24, 2014	11.8%	13.4%	10.8%	12.4%
17	June 30, 2014	11.6%	13.3%	10.9%	12.7%
18	July 1, 2014	10.1%	11.2%	11.5%	12.8%
19	July 7, 2014	10.9%	12.3%	11.2%	13.7%
20	July 8, 2014	12.7%	14.6%	12.2%	14.2%
Average		11.7%	13.1%	11.8%	14.3%

== Awards and nominations ==
Year	Award	Category	Recipient	Result
2014	7th Korea Drama Awards	Top Excellence Award, Actor	Lee Jong-suk	Nominated
2014	7th Korea Drama Awards	Excellence Award, Actress	Kang So-ra	Won
2014	3rd APAN Star Awards	Excellence Award, Actress in a Miniseries	Jin Se-yeon	Nominated
2014	3rd APAN Star Awards	Excellence Award, Actress in a Miniseries	Kang So-ra	Nominated
2014	3rd APAN Star Awards	Popular Star Award, Actress	Jin Se-yeon	Won
2014	SBS Drama Awards	SBS Special Award	Lee Jong-suk	Won
2014	SBS Drama Awards	Excellence Award, Actress in a Drama Special	Jin Se-yeon	Nominated
2014	SBS Drama Awards	Excellence Award, Actress in a Drama Special	Kang So-ra	Nominated
