= Hong Jong-chan =

South Korean director

- 홍종찬
- Born: South Korea
- Occupation: Television director
- Years active: 2007–present
- Employer: GTist

Korean name
- Hangul: 홍종찬
- RR: Hong Jongchan
- MR: Hong Chongch'an

Hong Jong-chan (Korean: 홍종찬) is a South Korean television director. He started with co-directing MBC's The Legend in 2007, and went on to direct drama such as Padam Padam, Doctor Stranger, My Secret Hotel, Dear My Friends, Life, Her Private Life, Link: Eat, Love, Kill, and Netflix original series Juvenile Justice.

== Career ==
He currently work as director in Gtist, production house owned by Studio Dragon. His most famous work there was Noh Hee-kyung's Dear My Friends.

While working with writer Kim Min-seok in Netflix original series Juvenile Justice, Hong had a lot of involvement in the scenario and had many discussions. It was because the writer was not a rookie and they had a good rapport. As a director, He made efforts to fundamentally understand the writer's intentions and provided input on areas where He felt there were ideas or expressions lacking. He was able to incorporate many of the writer's suggestions. The dialogues and speech styles of major characters and young offenders are difficult to imagine and write in detail before actually seeing the characters. As the characters became more concrete during the casting process, the tone and speech style of the dialogues changed. So, He had a lot of communication with the actors, and that was the aspect that was most significantly reflected. Rather than specifically having his opinions incorporated and discussing how it was done, it seems that He provided a lot of input on various aspects such as the script, dialogues, and episodes in this particular work, and the writer received them well, allowing for good collaboration.

== Filmography ==
=== Television series ===
Television series scriptsTelevision series directing credit
Year	Title		Network	Credited as			Ref.
Year	English	Korean	Network	Assistant Director	Main Director	Producer	Ref.
2007	The Legend	태왕사신기	MBC	Hong Jong-chan	Kim Jong-hak; Yoon Sang-ho	—N/a	
2008	Bichunmoo	비천무	SBS	Hong Jong-chan	Kim Young-jun	—N/a	
2009	Tamra, the Island	탐나는도다	MBC	Hong Jong-chan	Yoon Sang-ho	—N/a	
2010	Prosecutor Princess	검사 프린세스	SBS	—N/a	Jin Hyuk	Hong Jong-chan	
2011	City Hunter	시티헌터	SBS	—N/a	Jin Hyuk	Hong Jong-chan	
2011	Padam Padam	빠담빠담.... 그와 그녀의 심장박동소리	JTBC	Hong Jong-chan	Kim Kyu-tae	—N/a	
2013	Master's Sun	주군의 태양	SBS	—N/a	Jin Hyuk	Hong Jong-chan	
2014	Doctor Stranger	닥터 이방인	SBS	Hong Jong-chan	Jin Hyuk	—N/a	
2014	Secret Love	시크릿 러브	Dramacube	—N/a	Hong Jong-chan	—N/a	
2014	My Secret Hotel	마이 시크릿 호텔	tvN	—N/a	Hong Jong-chan	—N/a	
2016	Dear My Friends	디어 마이 프렌즈	tvN	—N/a	Hong Jong-chan	—N/a	
2017	The Most Beautiful Goodbye	세상에서 가장 아름다운 이별	tvN	—N/a	Hong Jong-chan	—N/a	
2017	Live Up to Your Name	명불허전	tvN	—N/a	Hong Jong-chan	—N/a	
2018	Life	라이프	JTBC	Im Hyun-wook	Hong Jong-chan	—N/a	
2019	Her Private Life	그녀의 사생활	tvN	—N/a	Hong Jong-chan	—N/a	
2022	Link: Eat, Love, Kill	링크: 먹고 사랑하라, 죽이게	tvN	—N/a	Hong Jong-chan	—N/a	

=== Web series ===
Web series directing credit
Year	Title		Role	Note	Ref.
Year	English	Korean	Role	Note	Ref.
2015	Life in Additional Time	로스:타임:라이프	Director	Naver TV, TV Chosun	
2022	Juvenile Justice	소년 심판	Director	Netflix	
2025	Mr. Plankton	Mr.플랑크톤	Director	Netflix	
2026	Teach You a Lesson	참교육	Director		

=== Music video ===
Music video appearances
Year	Title	Artist(s)	Ref.
2024	"Falling Slowly" (Vocals by Daesung)	Daesung	

== Accolades ==
Awards and nominations
Year	Award	Category	Recipient	Result	Ref.
2016	tvN10 Awards	Best Content Award, Drama	Dear My Friends	Won	
2017	53rd Baeksang Arts Awards	Best Drama	Dear My Friends	Won	
2017	53rd Baeksang Arts Awards	Best Director	Dear My Friends	Nominated	
2017	YWCA's Best TV Programme Awards	Grand Prize	Dear My Friends	Won	
