= Melancholia (TV series) =

2021 South Korean television series

- Promotional poster
- Hangul: 멜랑꼴리아
- RR: Mellangkkollia
- MR: Mellangkkollia
- Genre: Melodrama
- Created by: Kim Jae-hyun (tvN); Studio Dragon
- Written by: Kim Ji-woon
- Directed by: Kim Sang-hyeob
- Starring: Im Soo-jung; Lee Do-hyun
- Music by: Park Se-joon
- Country of origin: South Korea
- Original language: Korean
- No. of episodes: 16

Production
- Executive producers: Lee Hye-young; Kim Rak-hyun (CP)
- Producers: Moon Seok-hwan; Oh Kwang-hee; Yoo Beom-sang; Ham Geun-ho
- Editor: Kim Hee-sung
- Camera setup: Single-camera
- Running time: 60 minutes
- Production company: Bon Factory Worldwide

Original release
- Network: tvN
- Release: November 10 – December 30, 2021

Melancholia (Korean: 멜랑꼴리아) is a 2021 South Korean television series directed by Kim Sang-hyeob and starring Im Soo-jung and Lee Do-hyun. The series tells the story of scandals and corruption in private high schools in Gangnam. It premiered as tvN's 15th anniversary special project on tvN on November 10, 2021 and aired on Wednesdays and Thursdays at 22:30 (KST) till December 30, 2021. It is available for streaming on iQIYI and Viu in selected territories.

== Synopsis ==
Melancholia tells the story of Ji Yoon-soo (Im Soo-jung), a mathematics teacher at the prestigious private Ahseong High School, which is also a hotbed of corruption. She is good-natured on the outside, but gets very tenacious and stubborn once she makes up her mind about something. Extremely passionate about math, she is a teacher who encourages her students to find their own answers. At the school, she meets Baek Seung-yoo (Lee Do-hyun), a troubled student who is at the bottom of his class. She notices his potential in math, and with her attention and interactions with him, Seung-yoo's grades rise and he becomes number one in the class.

Baek Seung-yoo himself is a student who rarely talks, but he likes to take pictures with his camera. He has no friends at school, but he has a shocking past. When he was a child, he won many Mathematical Olympiads. When he was 10 years old, he entered the Massachusetts Institute of Technology in the United States, but he suddenly disappeared at the age of 12.

Yoon-soo never knew that her attention and interactions with Seung-yoo would create rumors of a teacher-student sexual scandal among other students and parents, which results in her being fired from her job. Four years later, Yoon-soo and Seung-yoo meet again. Now both as adults, they unite to expose the corruption at Ahseong High School, and to regain Yoon-soo's reputation as a teacher.

== Cast ==
=== Main ===
- Im Soo-jung as Ji Yoon-soo, a math teacher.
  - Cha Jung-hyun as young Ji Yoon-soo
- Lee Do-hyun as Baek Seung-yoo / Baek Min-jae, a math genius.
  - Choi Seung-hoon as young Baek Seung-yoo / Baek Min-jae

=== Supporting ===
==== Ahseong High School ====
- Jeon Jin-ki as Choi Seong-han, principal of Ahseong High School which is affiliated with Ahseong Academy Foundation.
- Jin Kyung as Noh Jung-ah, head of the school administration at Ahseong High School.
- Woo Da-vi as Seong Ye-rin, Min-joon's and Hye-mi's daughter, first student at Ahseong High School.
- Oh Hye-won as Noh Yeon-woo, the second daughter of the president of Ahseong Academy and the principal of Ahseong International Middle School.
- Choi Woo-sung as Jang Gyu-yeong, second in the entire school who is always jealous of Baek Seung-yoo.
- Yang Jo-ah as Kim Jin-hee, a teacher of the Korean language department at Ahseong High School and the homeroom teacher of the 8th grade in the second year.
- Kim Mi-hye as Ahn Seong-go, a math teacher at Ahseong High School.
- Lee Kang-ji as Lee Hyun-jae, a close friend of Seung-yoo.
- Lee Sang-jin as Park Hyun-do, a close friend of Baek Seung-yoo. He is lively bright and honest, and joins the dance club together with Seung-yoo and Hyun-jae.
- Son Jin-hwan as Oh Jin-taek, principal of Ahseong High School, a famous private high school in South Korea's 1st education district.
- Kim Ji-young as Kim Ji-na, the only daughter of Noh Jung-ah, head of school affairs at Ahseong High School. As Little Paris Hilton, she is friendly and outspoken under her mother's shadow, but neglects her friends and does evil.
- Shin Soo-yeon as Choi Si-an
- Park Sung-yeon as Yoo Seon-ah
- Lee Da-yeon as Kyung Soo-young, the daughter of Minister Kyung-min who uses her father's powers to transfer to Ahseong High School.

==== Others ====
- Choi Dae-hoon as Ryoo Seong-jae, Yoon-soo's fiancé, a policy advisor at the Office of Education.
- Jang Hyun-sung as Seong Min-joon, a parent of a student at Ahseong High School and a member of the National Assembly.
- Byun Jung-soo as Yoo Hye-mi, a top actress, wife of Seong Min-joon.
- Baek Ji-won as Min Hee-seung, Baek Seung-yoo's mother.
- Kim Ho-jin as Baek Min-sik, a psychiatrist in Hangok-dong.
- Sunwoo as Jenny's mother, a mother who works hard for her daughter Jenny's education.
- Oh Kwang-rok as Ji Hyun-wook, Ji Yoon-soo's father.
- Lee Se-na as Jo Yoon-ah, a radio station reporter.

== Production ==
In April 2021, Im Soo-jung was offered to appear in the TV series. Her agency, King Kong, reported that they were considering it positively. Im Soo-jung appears in the series after a hiatus of two years, as she last appeared in the 2019 tvN series Search: WWW. The line-up for the cast was confirmed in July 2021. Sunwoo appears in the series after a hiatus of 7 years. She last appeared in the 2014 series Family Secret.

On October 31, 2021 it was reported that 4 staff members at the filming site were found positive of COVID-19, and as per safety guidelines, the production was suspended. As this would affect the smooth flow of broadcast of the series, airing of the first episode was postponed for a week.

== Release ==
The series was scheduled to premiere on November 3, 2021 but due to contagion of COVID-19 at the filming site, the premiere was postponed to November 10.

== Original soundtrack ==
Melancholia

Soundtrack album by Various
- Released: 2021
- Genre: Soundtrack
- Languages: Korean; English
- Labels: Genie Music; Stone Music Entertainment

=== Part 1 ===
Released on November 17, 2021
No.	Title	Lyrics	Music	Artist	Length
1.	"All I Need"	Jayins, Jemma	Jayins	Jemma	3:10
2.	"All I Need" (Inst.)		Jayins		3:10

=== Part 2 ===
Released on December 2, 2021
No.	Title	Lyrics	Music	Artist	Length
1.	"Darling"	Choi In-young	Choi In-young	Sunwoo Jung-a	4:10
2.	"Darling" (Inst.)		Choi In-young		4:10

=== Part 3 ===
Released on December 9, 2021
No.	Title	Lyrics	Music	Artist	Length
1.	"Lily of the Valley" ((Original song: DANIEL))	DANIEL	DANIEL	Na Sang-hyun's band	4:20
2.	"Lily of the Valley" (Inst.)		Na Sang-hyun's band		4:20

=== Part 4 ===
Released on December 16, 2021
No.	Title	Lyrics	Music	Artist	Length
1.	"Let Me Know"	Hanjun, Park Se-joon	Lee Yoojin, Park Se-joon	CHEEZE	2:56
2.	"Let Me Know" (Inst.)		Lee Yoo-jin, Park Se-joon		2:56

== Viewership ==
Melancholia : South Korea viewers per episode (thousands)

Season	Episode number																Average
Season	1	2	3	4	5	6	7	8	9	10	11	12	13	14	15	16	Average
1	743	523	557	356	423	330	545	450	649	451	605	458	507	520	551	520	512

Source: Audience measurement performed nationwide by Nielsen Korea

Average TV viewership ratings
Ep.	Original broadcast date	Average audience share (Nielsen Korea)	
Ep.	Original broadcast date	Nationwide	Seoul
1	November 10, 2021	3.617% (2nd)	4.174% (2nd)
2	November 11, 2021	2.407% (2nd)	2.459% (2nd)
3	November 17, 2021	2.529% (3rd)	2.548% (3rd)
4	November 18, 2021	1.619% (2nd)	1.682% (4th)
5	November 24, 2021	1.993% (2nd)	1.865% (2nd)
6	November 25, 2021	1.496% (5th)	1.738% (3rd)
7	December 1, 2021	2.654% (2nd)	3.035% (2nd)
8	December 2, 2021	1.887% (2nd)	1.762% (3rd)
9	December 8, 2021	3.163% (2nd)	3.085% (2nd)
10	December 9, 2021	2.203% (2nd)	2.024% (2nd)
11	December 15, 2021	2.741% (2nd)	2.632% (2nd)
12	December 16, 2021	2.260% (2nd)	2.467% (2nd)
13	December 22, 2021	2.349% (2nd)	1.740% (4th)
14	December 23, 2021	2.303% (2nd)	1.903% (4th)
15	December 29, 2021	2.720% (1st)	2.769% (2nd)
16	December 30, 2021	2.450% (2nd)	2.277% (3rd)
Average		2.399%	2.386%
In the table above, the blue numbers represent the lowest ratings and the red numbers represent the highest ratings.; This drama airs on a cable channel/pay TV which normally has a relatively smaller audience compared to free-to-air TV/public broadcasters (KBS, SBS, MBC and EBS).
