= Villains (South Korean TV series) =

2025 South Korean television series

- Promotional poster
- Hangul: 빌런즈
- RR: Billeonjeu
- MR: Pillŏnjŭ
- Genre: Crime action
- Written by: Kim Hyung-jun
- Directed by: Jin Hyuk; Park Jin-young
- Starring: Yoo Ji-tae; Kwak Do-won; Lee Beom-soo; Lee Min-jung
- Music by: Chung Yae-kyung
- Country of origin: South Korea
- Original language: Korean
- No. of episodes: 8

Production
- Running time: 35-53 minutes
- Production companies: CJ ENM; Taewon Entertainment

Original release
- Network: TVING
- Release: December 18, 2025 – January 8, 2026

Villains (Korean: 빌런즈) is a 2025-26 South Korean television series starring Yoo Ji-tae, Kwak Do-won, Lee Beom-soo, and Lee Min-jung. The series premiered on TVING with its first two episodes on December 18, 2025, at 18:00 (KST), followed by two new episodes every Thursday, for a total of 8 episodes. It is also available for streaming on HBO Max in selected regions.

== Synopsis ==
A crime drama depicting bloody clashes and confrontations between villains over counterfeit "superdollar" money.

== Cast ==
- Yoo Ji-tae as J
- Kwak Do-won as Jang Joong-hyeok
- Lee Beom-soo as Cha Ki-tae
- Lee Min-jung as Han Soo-hyun
- Tae Won-seok as Tak joong-gi
- Jung Young-joo as Kkang Soon-ae
- Kim Jae-yong as Fixer
- Jung In-gi as Yang Cheol-jin
- I.L (IRRIS) as Yang Yeon-i

== Production ==
Villains is written by Kim Hyung-jun, directed by Jin Hyuk, Park Jin-young, and planned by CJ ENM, and co-produced by Taewon Entertainment.

The drama Villains was originally scheduled to premiere in 2023, but after filming wrapped in September 2022, actor Kwak Do-won was arrested for driving under the influence, causing a delay. Later, allegations surfaced against Lee Beom-soo, including abuse of power and discrimination as a school principal, along with a lawsuit seeking to prevent the drama's airing due to copyright infringement, resulting in yet another postponement.

== Release ==
After a two-year delay, TVING confirmed the series will be released on December 18, 2025, and will also be streaming simultaneously in 17 countries and regions in Asia Pacific through HBO Max and in Japan through Disney+ Japan.
