= Jin Hyuk =

South Korean television director

- Born: South Korea
- Other name: Chin Hyuk
- Education: Yonsei University - Business Administration
- Occupation: Television director
- Years active: 2003–present

Korean name
- Hangul: 진혁
- Hanja: 陳赫
- RR: Jin Hyeok
- MR: Chin Hyŏk

Jin Hyuk is a South Korean television director. He directed Brilliant Legacy (2009), City Hunter (2011), Prosecutor Princess (2010), Master's Sun (2013), Doctor Stranger (2014), and The Legend of the Blue Sea (2016).

== Career ==
Jin Hyuk graduated from Yonsei University in 2001 with a degree in Business Administration, then joined the TV network Seoul Broadcasting System (SBS). He first worked as a producer, became an assistant director from 2003 to 2007, then a second unit director in 2008.

In 2009, Jin directed his first television drama, Brilliant Legacy (also known as Shining Inheritance). A Cinderella-esque story about a poor, kind-hearted girl who becomes the sole heiress of a rich, elderly woman who wants to teach her spoiled family a lesson, Brilliant Legacy became an unexpected hit, reaching a peak viewership rating of 47.1%, and catapulted its relatively unknown stars Han Hyo-joo and Lee Seung-gi to fame. Jin won Best Drama PD at the 17th Korean Culture and Entertainment Awards, and was nominated for Best New Television Director at the 46th Baeksang Arts Awards.

He and Brilliant Legacy screenwriter So Hyun-kyung collaborated again for Prosecutor Princess (2010), a romantic comedy/legal drama in which a vain and shallow law graduate is forced to work as a public prosecutor which gradually changes her outlook on the world. City Hunter followed in 2011, which Jin considered a prequel of the same-titled manga by Tsukasa Hojo, transforming its protagonist into a Blue House IT expert by day, and a vengeful, justice-seeking vigilante by night. Despite middling domestic ratings for both series, Kim So-yeon (previously typecast in dramatic roles) drew praise for her comic acting in Prosecutor Princess, while her co-star Park Si-hoo and City Hunter lead actor Lee Min-ho increased their overseas fanbase due to their respective series. Jin received a Best Production Director nomination at the 4th Korea Drama Awards for City Hunter.

He then worked with the Hong sisters for Master's Sun (2013), a horror/romantic comedy starring So Ji-sub and Gong Hyo-jin about a selfish shopping mall CEO who finds himself falling for a woman who can communicate with ghosts. In 2014, Jin cast Lee Jong-suk as a genius doctor who defected from North Korea then encounters the doppelgänger of his dead first love in Doctor Stranger.

Jin is set to direct FHM 2, the sequel to the 2011 Chinese television drama FHM, which revolves around the friendship, desires, and ambitions of men in their thirties. Starring Park Hae-jin, Zhang Liang and Joker Xue, FHM 2 is a joint venture between a Chinese production company and Korean conglomerate CJ E&M and will air in 2015.

== Filmography ==
=== Television series ===
Television series scriptsTelevision series directing credit
Year	Title		Network	Credited as		Ref.
Year	English	Korean	Network	Assistant Director	Main Director	Ref.
2003	South of the Sun	태양의 남쪽	SBS	Jin Hyuk	Kim Soo-ryong	
2004	Human Market	인간시장	SBS	Jin Hyuk; Seo Jang-won	Hong Seong-chang; Son Jung-hyun	
2005	Queen's Conditions	여왕의 조건	SBS	Jin Hyuk	Park Young-soo	
2006	Single Life	독신천하	SBS	Jin Hyuk	Kim Jin-geun	
2007	Blue Fish	푸른 물고기	SBS	Jin Hyuk	Kim Soo-ryong	
2007	Get Karl! Oh Soo-jung	칼잡이 오수정	SBS	Jin Hyuk; Park Hyung-ki	Kwon Hyuk-chan	
2008	Bichunmoo	비천무	SBS	Jin Hyuk; Hong Jong-chan	Kim Young-jun	
2008	On Air	온에어	SBS	Jin Hyuk	Shin Woo-chul	
2008	Painter of the Wind	바람의 화원	SBS	Jin Hyuk	Jang Tae-yoo	
2009	Brilliant Legacy	찬란한 유산	SBS	—N/a	Jin Hyuk	
2010	Prosecutor Princess	검사 프린세스	SBS	—N/a	Jin Hyuk	
2011	City Hunter	시티헌터	SBS	—N/a	Jin Hyuk	
2015	The Chaser	추적자	SBS	Jin Hyuk; Jo Young-kwang	Jo Nam-kook	
2013	Master's Sun	주군의 태양	SBS	—N/a	Jin Hyuk	
2014	Doctor Stranger	닥터 이방인	SBS	Hong Jong-chan	Jin Hyuk	
2016	The Legend of the Blue Sea	푸른 바다의 전설	Park Seon-ho	—N/a	Jin Hyuk	
2021	Sisyphus: The Myth	시지프스: the myth	JTBC	—N/a	Jin Hyuk	
2024	The Tale of Lady Ok	옥씨부인전	JTBC	—N/a	Jin Hyuk	
2025	Villains	빌런즈	TVING			

== Accolades ==
=== Awards and nominations ===
Year	Award	Category	Recipient	Result	Ref.
2009	17th Korea Culture and Entertainment Awards	Drama PD Award	Jin Hyuk	Won	
2010	46th Baeksang Arts Awards	Best Drama	Brilliant Legacy	Nominated	
2010	46th Baeksang Arts Awards	Best New Director (TV)	Brilliant Legacy	Nominated	
2010	37th Korea Broadcasting Awards	Best Serial Drama	Brilliant Legacy	Won	
2010	14th YWCA Good TV Program Award	Female Drama Category	Brilliant Legacy	Won	
2011	44th WorldFest-Houston International Film Festival	Platinum Remi Award	Brilliant Legacy	Won	
2011	17th Shanghai Television Festival Magnolia Awards	Foreign TV Series Special Award	Brilliant Legacy	Won	
2011	4th Korea Drama Awards	Best Director	City Hunter	Nominated	
2012	7th Seoul International Drama Awards	Outstanding Korean Drama	City Hunter	Nominated	

=== State honors ===
Name of country, year given, and name of honor
Country/Organization	Year	Honor	Ref.
South Korea	2009	Minister of Culture, Sports and Tourism commendation	
