= Teach You a Lesson =

2026 South Korean television series

- Promotional poster
- Hangul: 참교육
- Hanja: 참敎育
- Lit.: True Education
- RR: Chamgyoyuk
- MR: Ch'amgyoyuk
- Genre: Action; School drama; Comedy
- Based on: Get Schooled by: Chae Yong-taek; Han Ga-ram
- Written by: Lee Nam-kyu; Kim Da-hee; Moon Jong-ho
- Directed by: Hong Jong-chan
- Starring: Kim Mu-yeol; Lee Sung-min; Jin Ki-joo; Pyo Ji-hoon
- Music by: Kim Tae-seong
- Country of origin: South Korea
- Original language: Korean
- No. of episodes: 10

Production
- Executive producers: Baek Choong-hwa; Lee Dong-kyu; Kim Eun-young
- Cinematography: Yoon Joo-hwan; Lee Choon-hwi
- Animators: Lee Sae-ha; Park Joo-won
- Editors: Park In-chul; Lee Soo-min
- Production companies: Ylab Plex; GTist

Original release
- Network: Netflix
- Release: June 5, 2026

Teach You a Lesson (Korean: 참교육) is a 2026 South Korean action school drama television series written by Lee Nam-kyu, Kim Da-hee, and Moon Jong-ho, directed by Hong Jong-chan, and starring Kim Mu-yeol, Lee Sung-min, Jin Ki-joo, and Pyo Ji-hoon. Based on the Naver webtoon Get Schooled by Chae Yong-taek and Han Ga-ram, the series follows an inspector from the Educational Rights Protection Bureau (ERPB) who is authorized by the government to use physical intervention and unconventional methods to discipline delinquent students and reform the educational system. It was released on Netflix on June 5, 2026.

The series achieved commercial success and generated strong domestic attention in South Korea, where it ranked highly across multiple buzz and popularity metrics, despite controversy surrounding the original webtoon. Critical reception was generally positive, with most reviews being favorable.

In July 2026, it was reported that a second season was under discussion, with production details such as filming schedule and cast yet to be finalized. The show topped Netflix's global non-English television chart following its release, which was cited as a factor supporting the potential renewal.

== Premise ==
In response to a rise in campus violence and the decline of faculty authority, the South Korean government establishes the Educational Rights Protection Bureau (ERPB) under the Teacher Rights Protection Act, headed by Minister of Education Choi Gang-seok. The Bureau is granted the legal authority to use any form of measure, including physical force and psychological pressure, to discipline both students and teachers, and reform the school system. ERPB inspector Na Hwa-jin is dispatched to various educational institutions to dismantle hierarchies established by delinquent students and address administrative corruption. Accompanied by eccentric investigator Im Han-rim and technophilic officer Bong Geun-dae, Hwa-jin utilizes his state-sanctioned immunity to neutralize school gangs and restore order.

== Cast and characters ==
=== Main ===
- Kim Mu-yeol as Na Hwa-jin

An intimidating former Special Forces captain-turned-inspector for the Educational Rights Protection Bureau (ERPB).

- Lee Sung-min as Choi Gang-seok

Minister of Education and founder of the ERPB.

- Jin Ki-joo as Im Han-rim

A former Special Forces sergeant-turned-inspector for the ERPB. She enjoys violence and is prone to screaming fits.

- Pyo Ji-hoon as Bong Geun-dae

A KAIST graduate and 5th-grade civil servant who is hired by the ERPB. He is the brains of the operations, and is not as physically inclined as Hwa-jin and Han-rim.

=== Supporting ===
- Kim Jong-soo as Hwang Gi-tae

A member of the National Assembly who supports the abolition of ERPB.

- Lee Bong-jun as Cho Gyu-cheol

Ga-yoon's student, whom she cared for before he murdered her two years ago.

==== Daehan High School ====
- Lee Seung-gyu as Ryu Jun-hyeong

A student of Class 2-5 who is a perpetrator of school violence.

- Kim Do-geon a Kim Gwang-su

A student of Class 2-5 who is Jun-young's right arm.

- Lee Chan-yong as Kim Gyeong-min

A student of Class 2-5 who is a victim of school violence.

- Jeong Soo-hyun as Park Dae-seok

A student of Class 2-5 who was a victim of school violence and eventually took his own life.

- Song Young-gyu as Ryu Gwang-pil

Jun-hyeong's father, who is a member of the National Assembly.

==== Guun Hitech High School ====
- Jeon Bong-seok as Kim Hyeong-ju

A timid student of the school's automobile department who is not involved in any gang activity.

- Yoo Tae-joo as Park Seong-hwan

A student of the school's automobile department, who is interested in joining Kwon-hyuk's gang.

- Ok Jin-uk as Cho In-beom

A student of the school's electrical department, who is interested in joining Kwon-hyuk's gang.

- Lee Tae-hwan as Jang Kwon-hyuk

A third-year student who joined a gang before graduating from the school, and has a huge influence in the school.

==== Soyeon Girls' High School ====
- Lee Sang-hee as Jeong Sun-young

The homeroom teacher of Class 3-4 who has become disenchanted with her teaching.

- Kwon Hyuk as Ko Young-soo

A former teacher who took his own life due to Ye-ri's manipulation of public opinion on social media.

- Park Seo-yoon as Han Ye-ri

A student of Class 3-4 and an influencer.

- Kim Se-yeon as Jung So-yeong

A student of Class 3-4 and Ye-ri's close friend.

==== Chukmyeong Foreign Language High School ====
- Bae Jun-hyung as Park Hyeon-ung

The school's top student, who is from an underprivileged family background.

- Choi Deok-moon as Cheon Sang-yeol

A teacher of the school who is also a famous online lecturer. Although boasting a perfect student record, the ERPB find evidence of collusion with the wealthy parents.

- Sim Su-bin as Jung Su-jeong

A student of the school who benefited from her mother's connections.

- Kim Seon-hwa as Kim Young-ran

Su-jeong's mother and the wife of the chairman of PH Group, a major corporation.

==== Hyunjung Elementary School ====
- Song Si-an as Choi Ji-seon

The young form teacher of Class 1-3, who faced various forms of harassment from the parents of one of her students, U-jin.

- Park Ji-yeon as Lee Ji-young

U-jin's mother, who frequently harassed Ji-seon in the context of protecting her son.

- Choi Ja-woon as Kim U-jin

A shy student of Class 1-3.

- Kwon Dong-ho as Kim Seok-hyun

U-jin's hot-tempered father, who works as a manager of a bank.

==== Hyunjin Middle School ====
- Jang Yo-hoon as Min Ji-woong

A student of the school, and leads a delinquent quartet of the school who constantly caused trouble inside and outside school, but were always let go due to being under 14 at the time of committing the crimes.

- Kim Chae-eun as Oh Yoon-jin

A student of the school who fell victim to the effects of narcotics.

- Lim Hyun-mook as Yoon Min-su

Ji-woong's friend and member of the delinquent quartet of the school.

- Yoon Tae-sik as Lee Do-hyeon

Ji-woong's friend and member of the delinquent quartet of the school.

- Choi Hyun-joon as Choi U-seong

Ji-woong's friend and member of the delinquent quartet of the school.

- Kim Kyun-ha as Kim Su-gyeom

An inmate of the juvenile correctional facility whose help Hwa-jin enlists to terrorize Ji-woong and his friends. He was imprisoned for the murder of four bullies during his high school days.

==== Nakwon High School ====
- Bae Jae-young as Lee Jae-yun

A student of the school who is addicted to illegal online gambling, and went missing after incurring huge debts.

- Jo Eun-soul as Shin Ji-soo

The ringleader of an illegal online gambling operation.

- Jo Jun-ho as Ji Sung-bin

A student of the school who is Jae-yun's best friend and introduced illegal online gambling to his fellow students.

- Jo Hyun-wu as Jae-yun's father

Jae-yun's father, an honest company worker who is forced to resign to pay for his son's gambling debts, while collecting a lot of material related to illegal online gambling, and visited the ERPB for help to look for his missing son.

==== Seungyeon High School ====
- Kim Tae-young as Jung Hyun-min

The school's top student, who fell victim to narcotics disguised as medicine.

- Seo Young-hee as Hyun-min's mother

Hyun-min's strict and overbearing mother, she would stop at nothing in order to make her son go to medical college, and valued medical college more than her son's well-being.

==== Jinwon High School ====
- Lee Woo-je as Jang Sung-gu

A student of the school who was frequently exploited by Chi-ho and his friends.

- Kim Jae-seon as Lee Chi-ho

A student of the school who frequently exploited Sung-gu while pretending to be his friend.

- Shin Dong-jun as Lee Jong-su

A friend of Chi-ho who assisted him in exploiting Sung-gu.

- Lee Seung-noh as Jung Hyun-tae

A friend of Chi-ho who assisted him in exploiting Sung-gu.

=== Special appearances ===
- Ha Young as Choi Ga-yoon

Gang-seok's daughter and Hwa-jin's fiancé. She was a passionate teacher, but was murdered by her student Gyu-cheol two years ago. Her death inspired her father to establish the ERPB in her honor.

- Lee Yeo-jin as a news anchor
- Jeon Seung-hoon as Seo Tae-hoon

The captain of the Kangju High School basketball team. He habitually abuses his team members.

== Episodes ==
No.	Original release date
1	June 5, 2026
In 2024, teacher Choi Ga-yoon is killed by student Cho Gyu-cheol. In response, Ga-yoon's father Gang-seok launches the Educational Rights Protection Bureau (ERPB) and enlists Na Hwa-jin, his son-in-law who is a former special forces captain. Hwa-jin is sent to Daehan High School where student Park Dae-seok ended his life due to Ryu Jun-hyeong's constant bullying; as the son of politician Ryu Gwang-pil, Jun-hyeong faces little to no consequence. Upon arriving, Hwa-jin continuously antagonises Jun-hyeong. Meanwhile, Gwang-pil corrupted affairs are exposed, leading to his arrest. In the aftermath, Jun-hyeong becomes bullied. Enraged and embarrassed, Jun-hyeong tries to burn down the school, but Hwa-jin intervenes and pushes Jun-hyeong to realise and accept the consequences of his actions, ending up in his arrest along with the other students who bullied Dae-seok. Gang-seok and Hwa-jin then visits Ga-yoon's grave. Runtime: 52 minutes.
2	June 5, 2026
The interventions of ERPB at Daehan High School causes media scandal for its violent measures, but Gang-seok refuses to end the program. Hwa-jin hires Bong Geun-de to investigate the Guun Hi-Tech School, infamous for its dangerous environments. Upon arriving, Geun-de discovers the students participate in brawls and vandalism to impress the local gangster Jang Gwon-hyeok and join his gang. At the teachers' insistence, Hwa-jin goes to the school and forces the students to learn in brutal and radical ways. Student In-beom seeks help from Gwon-hyeok, who sends his goons to kill Hwa-jin, but the latter single-handedly beats them all before they are arrested, ending tyranny at the school. Gang-seok's political opponent Hwang Gi-tae exposes the ERPB's origins. Runtime: 57 minutes.
3	June 5, 2026
In a flashback, Gyu-cheol revealed having killed Ga-yoon out of love, and is sentenced to two years. Hwa-jin tried to kill him, but Gang-seok stopped him. In the present, Soyeon Girls' School faces scandal when its popular student and social influencer Han Ye-ri accuses her teacher Ko Yeong-su of sexual assault. With both his personal and professional life in turmoil, Ko commits suicide. Jung Seon-yeong, another teacher of hers, also becomes under Ye-ri's pressure after footage of her helping a student is edited to pass it as abuse. Fearing Seon-yeong may also end her life, some of Ye-ri's classmate seek ERPB's help. Hwa-jin hires his former military associate Im Han-rim, who pressures Seon-yeong's class to behave. Hwa-jin shows Seon-yeong proof of her student's request, regaining confidence in herself and trust towards her students. Seon-yeong stands up to Ye-ri in front of the whole class; feeling embarrassed, Ye-ri attempts to accuse Seon-yeong of assault, but Geun-de hacks her accounts and releases the unedited accusation towards Ko, demolishing her career and reputation. Ye-ri then confronts and attacks Seon-yeong at her house, but ERPB intervenes. Hwa-jin saves Seon-yeong from falling to death, and Han-rim incapacitates Ye-ri, leading up to her arrest. Runtime: 72 minutes.
4	June 5, 2026
In a flashback, it is revealed that a younger Han-rim was rescued from violent bullies by Hwa-jin. In the present, following a press conference exposing ERPB, Han-rim begins to doubt the program, and Geun-de requests a transfer, but Gang-seok stops him. They receive footage of an assault at Chukmyeong Foreign Language High School, where student Park Hyeon-ung brutally punched teacher Cheon Sang-yeol. Upon arriving, Han-rim notices Hwa-jin's sudden shift in tone where he continuously praises Sang-yeol. Although first confused at the situation, ERPB discovers that Sang-yeol inadvertently caused the fall of Hyeong-ung's parents' business, and notices his class only features students of wealthy families; Sang-yeol had accepted bribery to degrade Hyeong-un and allow Su-jeong to succeed through cheating. Upon investigating, Hwa-jin finds out Ye-Ri suffered a similar setback due to her less privileged upbringing. Hwa-jin, Gang-seok, and Han-rim are arrested. Geun-de uses his transfer to pass instructions to the school to thwart Sang-yeol's efforts. Upon being released, ERPB exposes Sang-yeol's treachery, resulting in his arrest, where he is confronted by Ye-ri. The parents involved, including Su-jeong's mother, as well as the owner of the conspiring hagwon are also arrested. Gang-seok then uses the situation to save the ERPB's reputation. Runtime: 68 minutes.
5	June 5, 2026
Hyeongjung Elementary School Grade 1 teacher Choi Ji-seon has her life turn into turmoil when she meets the mother of U-jin, Lee Ji-young, who becomes aggressive and overwhelming. When Ji-seon refuses to take U-jin's side in a fight, Ji-young then harasses her in her personal space and accuses her of sexual harassment towards U-jin. Ji-seon's enthusiasm and spirit quickly deteriorates as a result. Her mother finds her diary in which Ji-seon contemplates suicide, and hires the ERPB to intervene. Han-rim arrives as Ji-seon tries to hang herself and has her placed on leave for mental health issues. Hwa-jin becomes the substitute teacher and becomes overwhelming to Ji-young and confronts U-jin's short-tempered father. When he sees Ji-young aggressively taking U-jin back home, he sues her. In an ensuing confrontation, Hwa-jin exposes the emotional trauma she caused to Ji-seon, and shows Ji-young U-jin and Ji-seon in an enjoyable activity, and Ji-young is investigated by authorities. Hwa-jin reads Ga-yoon's teaching diary and discovers writings about Gyu-cheol. Runtime: 66 minutes.
6	June 5, 2026
Gang-seok pushes Hwa-jin to not investigate Ga-yoon's death further when he doubts the true reasoning behind the murder. Later on, Hwa-jin, Han-rim, and Geun-de arrest a group of scholars when they steal a car and cause havoc in high pursuit while accompanying a comatose girl. As minors, they are released within hours, but Gang-seok sends the trio to Hyeonjin Middle School, where the comatose girl, Yun-jin, studies. Upon finding her in bad health, it is revealed that Yun-jin became addicted to a synthetic drug that causes weight loss; to pay for pills, she is forcefully enlisted by the drug dealer Ji-ung to help his business. As he becomes more abusive, Yun-jin had them arrested, but were released and further abused her out of revenge. In response, ERPB sends them to a juvenile detention center amid convicted murderers. In the center, Ji-ung becomes the target of Kim Su-gyeom, a convicted mass murderer who murdered his bullies in a fit of madness. The children's parents tries to release them, but fails when Ji-ung admits to selling the drug and tries to attack Yun-jin, who refuses to forgive them. As Hwa-jin thanks Su-gyeom for his arranged help, Ji-ung is attacked in prison, only for Gyu-cheol to intervene, to Hwa-jin's shock. Runtime: 69 minutes.
7	June 5, 2026
Gyu-cheol fails to gain Hwa-jin's forgiveness as they pass by each other. At a ERPB meeting, a parent pleas to help his son, Lee Jae-yun, for his gambling addiction; participating in online games, Jae-yun as accumulated a ₩85 million debt, forcing the family to pay, only for Jae-yun to accumulate a bigger debt and leave without notice. The ERPB investigates and sends Geun-de to infiltrate the Nakwon High School, where most students are gambling addicts. Geun-de meets Seong-bin, who introduces him to gambling, and Geun-de soon becomes addicted as well. With Seong-bin's contacts to loan sharks, Geun-de arranges a debt. However, a distracted Han-rim fails to protect Geun-de, and the latter is captured and forced to work on online scams to attract potential victims; among him are various students, including Jae-yun. Geun-de uses his technical abilities to send a Morse code to the ERPB, who successfully locates the hideout. A remorseful Han-rim brutally beats the loan sharks and rescue Geun-de, while Hwa-jin brutally beats the boss. Jae-yun is hospitalized and soon goes to therapy, although he and Seong-bin are reprimanded by Hwa-jin for the harm they had caused to their parents. Gi-tae then seeks Gyu-cheol's help to bring Gang-seok down. Runtime: 64 minutes.
8	June 5, 2026
The ERPB investigates Seungyeon High School, where student Jung Hyeon-min faints during a college early admission test for med school. Investigations by the ERPB revealed that he is under immense pressure from his mother and that Hyeon-min has received little nutrition and sleep to prevent his studies from being neglected. His mother has been giving him pills that help concentrate. Initially, his mother obtained these pills from the mother of another top student, but soon resorts to a more dangerous set of drugs. Hwa-jin discovers the pills are unauthorized ADHD and heart medication which are illegal in South Korea, on which Hyeon-min has become dependent. Hwa-jin intervenes and pushes Hyeon-min's mother to follow her son's strict routine. Unable to continue, she then expresses all her sacrifices to allow Hyeon-min to become a doctor and secure a financial future. She reunites with a now-hospitalized Hyeon-min, who has overcome his dependence thanks to Geun-de and Han-rim. Although his mother remains adamant to send him to medical school, Hyeon-min finally stands up for himself and reveals his intents to stop studying medicine and focus on his recovery. Investigating the drugs, Hwa-jin finds a connection with one of Ga-yoon's writings. Meanwhile, Gyu-cheol decides to return to school. Runtime: 1 hour.
9	June 5, 2026
Gyu-cheol's return to school results in a protest. Hwa-jin is sent to keep an eye on him. Gyu-cheol notices a group of students and enlists the ERPB to investigate the bullying. Hwa-jin discovers that group member Jang Seong-gu is only around them for his hotspot, but Seong-gu rebuffs the claim. However, Seong-gu soon realizes when another group member, Chi-ho, who abuses Seong-gu's finances and services, blackmails him into sending pornography to his sister should Seong-gu cuts contact with them. As no one believes him, not even his own mother, Seong-gu accepts the ERPB's help. Geun-de is then sent to Chi-ho's group, but his cover is soon blown, prompting Han-rim to disguise as a geek, which goes successful, and the bullies' devices are encrypted to Geun-de, who then uses their finances and services. Chi-ho soon becomes agitated, only for his reputation to tarnish in front of his schoolmates. Chi-ho confronts Gyu-cheol, who arranged the situation, and is pushed down the roof. The event is recorded and Gi-tae uses the recording to blame the ERPB of pushing a student to suicide. Meanwhile, Hwa-jin punches Gyu-cheol after mocking Ga-yoon's death. Runtime: 67 minutes.
10	June 5, 2026
In a flashback, it is revealed that Ga-yoon has attempted to bring Gyu-cheol out of his criminal ways, but discovered the drugs, prompting Gyu-cheol to stab her after learning she did not talk to anyone. In the present, the ERPB falls under public scrutiny and is forced to shut down. Nonetheless, the members decide to go rogue and investigate Gyu-cheol. Knowing of his drug business, they hire past teachers they helped to stop the spreading. During the investigation, Han-rim accidentally consumes the drug, prompting Geun-de to bring her back to her senses by kissing her. Hwa-jin confronts Gyu-cheol, who has taken Seong-gu hostage. Hwa-jin is stabbed similarly to Ga-yun, but manages to subdue Gyu-cheol. Gi-tae is arrested for his involvement. With Gyu-cheol arrested again, the ERPB resumes. Runtime: 61 minutes.

== Production ==
=== Development ===
In late 2024, it was announced that the Naver webtoon Get Schooled by Chae Yong-taek and Han Ga-ram would be adapted into a drama. In early 2025, Ylab Plex announced a content supply deal with Netflix ending in August 2026, which industry analysts identified as the production window for the series. Developed under the working title True Lessons, it is produced by Ylab Plex and GTist, directed by Hong Jong-chan, and written by Lee Nam-kyu, Kim Da-hee, and Moon Jong-ho.

=== Casting ===
Kim Nam-gil was reportedly in talks to lead the series in November 2024. On the same month, Kim Mu-yeol was confirmed to play the lead role and he cite his trust in director Hong following their collaboration on the 2022 legal drama Juvenile Justice.

Jin Ki-joo, Pyo Ji-hoon, and Lee Sung-min joined the lead cast in January 2025. By March 2025, Netflix confirmed the four actors' appearances. In July 2025, Ha Young joined the cast.

=== Filming ===
Principal photography began in the first half of 2025.

== Release ==
Initially slated for a second-quarter 2026 release, Teach You a Lesson was released exclusively on Netflix on June 5.

== Reception ==
=== Critical response ===
On the review aggregator website Rotten Tomatoes, 90% of 10 critics' reviews are positive, with an average rating of 6.8/10.

iMBC awarded the series 3 out of 4 stars, describing it as balancing teacher authority and student rights while avoiding the full glorification of violence. The Fact and TV Daily praised its emotional weight, realistic depiction of teacher burnout and parental negligence, and its lingering impact that prompts reflection on the education system. Ilgan Sports and Sports Today noted the cathartic satisfaction but also the bittersweet aftertaste and ethical unease. Sports Seoul praised the series for addressing specific real-world issues such as malicious parental complaints, juvenile offenders exempt from punishment, "MZ mafia" parents, and teenage gambling/drug crimes. It commended director Hong Jong-chan and writer Lee Nam-kyu for focusing on structural education failures and victims' trauma. However, it criticized the series for ultimately justifying violence through extra-legal webtoon-style solutions, noting that this gap sometimes weakens narrative persuasiveness, and highlighted the irony of the 19+ rating limiting access for the teenagers most affected. Joel Keller of Decider gave the series a "Stream It" recommendation, calling it an entertaining exercise in wish-fulfillment for those frustrated by bullying and ineffective institutions. Forbes hailed the series as "one of the smartest, best-written, and most addictive feel-good dramas of the year." South China Morning Post was critical, describing the premise of government-backed corporal punishment as "alarming" and noting the series' unclear overall message.

Performances received consistent acclaim, particularly Kim Mu-yeol for his charismatic and commanding presence across action, comedy, and drama. Lee Sung-min brought gravitas as Education Minister Choi Gang-seok, while Jin Ki-joo and Pyo Ji-hoon added energy and chemistry to the team.

=== Viewership ===
The series has achieved significant commercial success both domestically and internationally, holding the No. 1 position on Netflix’s Global Top 10 Non-English TV Shows list for two consecutive weeks. In its second week, it ranked among Netflix's Top 10 series in more than 90 countries and reached No. 1 in 46 countries worldwide, becoming the platform's most-watched series globally that week with 21.1 million views. It remained at No. 1 on Netflix's Non-English TV rankings for four consecutive weeks, accumulating more than 490 million hours viewed and becoming the fifth most-watched Korean Netflix original series of all time, surpassing The Glory.

In South Korea, the series also generated substantial public interest and online engagement. During its debut week, lead actor Kim Mu-yeol topped the cast buzz rankings, while the series ranked second in the TV-OTT drama buzz rankings. It additionally recorded an opening-week buzz score of 54,881, the highest achieved by a Netflix original series in the country that year. All main cast members entered the Top 10 cast buzz rankings.

In its second week, the series experienced a 60.5% increase in overall buzzworthiness compared to its debut week. It ranked first across all four categories used to measure buzzworthiness: news coverage, Voice of Netizens (VON), video content, and social media activity. Its buzz score rose to 88,089 points, placing it among the highest-scoring Netflix original dramas and making it the most buzzworthy weekly drama of 2026 at the time. The series surpassed Perfect Crown, which had previously recorded 82,718 points.

=== South Korean teachers' reaction ===
Following the release of the series, Korean Federation of Teachers' Associations praised the drama for highlighting growing concerns in South Korean schools, including declining classroom discipline, violations of teacher authority, and the lack of institutional support for educators. While some criticized its depiction of violence and vigilante justice, the organization argued that the series reflects real challenges in education and has fueled broader discussions about strengthening legal protections for teachers.

=== Impact ===
In the wake of its release, Gyeonggi Province Superintendent-elect Ahn Min-seok proposed creating a real-life "Teacher Rights Protection Bureau", the organization featured in the story, stating that "Education is impossible unless teachers' authority is restored." Ahn appeared on CBS Radio's Park Sung-tae's News Show on June 16 and stated accordingly that he has been receiving messages from individual teachers, including those with special forces backgrounds, saying that if "Teacher Rights Protection Bureau" is created, they definitely want to serve there.

== Controversy ==
=== Controversy of source material ===
The series is based on the webtoon Get Schooled. In 2023, the webtoon's 125th chapter attracted controversy after it depicted themes of "reverse racism" and included racial slurs and character portrayals that critics described as racist stereotypes. Following the backlash, the English-language version of the webtoon was removed from the Webtoon platform, while publication later resumed on Naver Webtoon in South Korea after a temporary hiatus. The webtoon had also drawn criticism from some commentators for its portrayal of social issues, including feminism, and for its depiction of women and ethnic minorities.

=== Domestic protests and union boycotts ===
Following the announcement of the live-action adaptation, the project faced immediate domestic backlash. Numerous educational institutions and labor organizations in South Korea, most notably the Korean Teachers and Education Workers Union (KTU), publicly called for the series to be canceled. In an official statement titled "Violence Is Not True Education," the KTU argued that the series' premise—which features a government official utilizing physical force to discipline students—effectively glorifies corporal punishment, an act strictly banned in South Korean schools. The union further alleged that the narrative normalizes classroom aggression, undermines democratic conflict resolution, and harms the educational system by reducing real-world teachers to one-dimensional, passive caricatures.

Public pushback also targeted the show's potential and confirmed cast. Actor Kim Nam-gil's fanbase issued statements opposing his involvement, citing the original webtoon's history of promoting corporal punishment and its controversial depictions of racism and sexism. On November 8, Kim Nam-gil addressed the concerns via his Instagram, clarifying that while the project had been proposed to his agency, he had not yet personally reviewed it or accepted the role, adding that his focus was entirely on the filming of The Fiery Priest 2. Furthermore, viewers and fans actively petitioned other attached actors to decline their roles, with some groups releasing public statements specifically objecting to actress Jin Ki-joo joining the production.

=== Netflix response ===
Netflix addressed the pre-release backlash during the "Next on Netflix 2026 Korea" showcase in Seoul. Bae Jong-byung, a senior director for Netflix, publicly acknowledged the severe criticisms and sensitive themes surrounding specific episodes of the original webtoon. Bae stated that the production team approached the adaptation with a "strong sense of responsibility" and had actively taken the public's concerns into account during development. He asserted that the script and production had been handled through a "more considered and refined lens" to ensure the story was conveyed with appropriate sensitivity.
