= Life (South Korean TV series) =

2018 South Korean television series

- Promotional poster
- Hangul: 라이프
- RR: Raipeu
- MR: Raip'ŭ
- Genre: Medical drama
- Written by: Lee Soo-yeon
- Directed by: Hong Jong-chan; Im Hyun-wook
- Starring: Lee Dong-wook; Cho Seung-woo; Won Jin-ah
- Music by: Lim Ha-young
- Country of origin: South Korean
- Original language: Korean
- No. of episodes: 16

Production
- Executive producer: Oh Hwan-min
- Producers: Min Hyun-il; Lee Sung-jin
- Camera setup: Single camera
- Production companies: Signal Entertainment Group; AM Studio

Original release
- Network: JTBC
- Release: July 23 – September 11, 2018

Life (Korean: 라이프) is a 2018 South Korean television series written by Lee Soo-yeon and directed by Hong Jong-chan, starring Lee Dong-wook, Cho Seung-woo and Won Jin-ah. The series aired on JTBC from July 23 to September 11, 2018 and is also available for streaming on Netflix.

== Synopsis ==
At one of South Korea's largest medical centers, ideals and interests collide between a patient-centered emergency medicine doctor and the hospital's newly-appointed CEO.

== Cast ==
=== Main ===
- Lee Dong-wook as Ye Jin-woo
  - Choi Ro-woon as young Ye Jin-woo

An emergency medicine specialist.

- Cho Seung-woo as Koo Seung-hyo

CEO of Sangkook University Hospital.

- Won Jin-ah as Lee No-eul

A junior pediatric specialist.

- Lee Kyu-hyung as Ye Seon-woo
  - Kim Yeon-ung as young Ye Seon-woo

Judge at the Health Insurance Review & Assessment Service and an orthopedic specialist. He is Ye Jin-woo's brother.

- Yoo Jae-myung as Joo Kyung-moon

Chief of the Cardiothoracic Surgery Department.

- Moon So-ri as Oh Se-hwa

Chief of the Neurosurgery Department and the Director of Sangkook University Hospital.

=== Recurring ===
- Moon Sung-keun as Kim Tae-sang

Chief of the Orthopedic Surgery Department and the Deputy Director of Sangkook University Hospital.

- Chun Ho-jin as Lee Bo-hoon

A psychiatrist and the former Director of Sangkook University Hospital.

- Tae In-ho as Sunwoo Chang

A coordinator at the Transplant Center.

- Yeom Hye-ran as Kang Kyung-ah

Manager of Sangkook University Hospital.

- Choi Yu-hwa as Choi Seo-hyun

A reporter for the online newspaper Saegeul21.

- Um Hyo-sup as Lee Sang-yeop

Chief of the Cancer Center and former Deputy Director of Sangkook University Hospital.

- Kim Won-hae as Lee Dong-soo

Chief of the Emergency Department.

- Jung Moon-sung as Jo Nam-hyung

Chairman of Hwajeong Group.

- Choi Gwang-il as Jang Min-ki

Chief of the Transplant Center.

- Woo Mi-hwa as Kim Jung-hee

Chief of the Obstetrics & Gynaecology Department.

- Park Min-gwan as Ko Young-jae

Chief of the Pediatric Surgery Department.

- Jung Hee-tae as Seo Ji-yong

Chief of the Ophthalmology Department.

- Kim Do-hyun as Kang Yoon-mo

Chief of the Plastic Surgery Department.

- Hwang In-joon as Choi Young-jin

An anesthesiologist.

- Lee Hyun-kyun as Lee Hyeon-gyun

Director of the Restructuring Team at Sangkook University Hospital.

- Lee Sang-hee as Kim Eun-ha

A nurse at the Emergency Department.

- Son Min-ji as Ahn Hyun-i

A nurse at the Emergency Department.

- Han Min as Park Jae-hyuk

An emergency medicine resident.

=== Extended ===
- Lee Kyu-sung as Kyu-sung
- Oh Hye-won as Mrs. Jung

A member of the Health Insurance and Assessment Committee.

- Yoo In-soo as Choi Woo-jin

A resident at the Cancer Center.

- Park Ji-yeon as Lee So-jung

A nurse at the Cardiothoracic Surgery Department.

- Nam Gi-ae as the mother of Jin-woo and Sun-woo
- Shin Sung-min as the driver

== Production ==
The first script reading was held on March 29, 2018 at the JTBC building, in Sangam-dong, Seoul, South Korea.

== Original soundtrack ==
Life OST

Soundtrack album by Various Artists
- Released: 2018
- Genre: Soundtrack
- Languages: Korean; English
- Labels: Signal Entertainment Group; Genie Music

=== Part 1 ===
Released on July 23, 2018
No.	Title	Lyrics	Music	Artist	Length
1.	"Home"	Brand Newjiq	Han Kwan-hee; Song Young-min; Park Sang-joon	Ha Dong-kyun	3:46
Total length:					3:46

=== Part 2 ===
Released on August 6, 2018
No.	Title	Lyrics	Music	Artist	Length
1.	"Close Your Eyes"	Jeong Jun-ho; March; Kim Ah-reum	Somebody's Tale	Sojin (Girl's Day)	3:32
Total length:					3:32

=== Part 3 ===
Released on August 20, 2018
No.	Title	Lyrics	Music	Artist	Length
1.	"Silence"	The Name; Choi Sung-il; Min Yeon-jae	The Name; Choi Sung-il	Soyou	3:31
Total length:					3:31

=== Part 4 ===
Released on August 27, 2018
No.	Title	Lyrics	Music	Artist	Length
1.	"Going Home (귀가)"	Jo Kyu-chan	Jo Kyu-chan	Jeon Woo-sung (Noel)	3:51
Total length:					3:51

=== Part 5 ===
Released on September 3, 2018
No.	Title	Lyrics	Music	Artist	Length
1.	"Bye"	ZUWAN	ZUWAN	ZUWAN	3:17
Total length:					3:17

=== Part 6 ===
Released on September 11, 2018
No.	Title	Lyrics	Music	Artist	Length
1.	"Fine (잘 지내요)"	Jung Seung-hwan	Lee Jin-ah	Jung Seung-hwan	3:43
Total length:					3:43

== Viewership ==
Life : South Korea viewers per episode (thousands)

Season	Episode number																Average
Season	1	2	3	4	5	6	7	8	9	10	11	12	13	14	15	16	Average
1	993	1081	1072	1036	1001	1040	934	1137	1122	1174	1051	1174	1085	1155	1151	1332	1096

Source: Audience measurement performed nationwide by Nielsen Media Research.

Average TV viewership ratings
Ep.	Original broadcast date	Average audience share	
Ep.	Original broadcast date	AGB Nielsen	
Ep.	Original broadcast date	Nationwide	Seoul
1	July 23, 2018	4.334%	5.232%
2	July 24, 2018	4.971%	5.631%
3	July 30, 2018	4.601%	5.308%
4	July 31, 2018	4.493%	4.906%
5	August 6, 2018	4.328%	5.158%
6	August 7, 2018	4.466%	5.460%
7	August 13, 2018	4.116%	4.906%
8	August 14, 2018	4.591%	5.509%
9	August 20, 2018	4.538%	5.728%
10	August 21, 2018	5.150%	6.353%
11	August 27, 2018	4.532%	5.586%
12	August 28, 2018	5.310%	6.483%
13	September 3, 2018	4.920%	5.894%
14	September 4, 2018	5.093%	6.403%
15	September 10, 2018	4.751%	5.759%
16	September 11, 2018	5.561%	6.795%
Average		4.735%	5.694%
Special	July 17, 2018	1.525%	1.7%
In the table above, the blue numbers represent the lowest ratings and the red numbers represent the highest ratings.; This drama aired on a cable channel/pay TV which normally has a relatively smaller audience compared to free-to-air TV/public broadcasters (KBS, SBS, MBC and EBS).

== Awards and nominations ==
Year	Award	Category	Recipient	Result	Ref.
2018	6th APAN Star Awards	Grand Prize (Daesang)	Cho Seung-woo	Nominated	
2018	6th APAN Star Awards	Top Excellence Award, Actor in a Miniseries	Lee Dong-wook	Nominated	
2018	6th APAN Star Awards	Best Supporting Actor	Yoo Jae-myung	Won	
2018	6th APAN Star Awards	Best Screenwriter	Lee Soo-yeon	Won	
2018	2nd The Seoul Awards	Best Drama	Life	Nominated	
2018	2nd The Seoul Awards	Best Actor	Cho Seung-woo	Nominated	
2018	2nd The Seoul Awards	Best Supporting Actress	Moon So-ri	Won	
