= Song Si-an =

South Korean actress (born 2002)

- Born: Song Si-an; January 4, 2002 (age 24); South Korea
- Occupation: Actress
- Years active: 2021–present

Korean name
- Hangul: 차정현
- RR: Cha Jeonghyeon
- MR: Ch'a Chŏnghyŏn

Stage name
- Hangul: 송시안
- RR: Song Sian
- MR: Song Sian

Cha Jung-hyun (Korean: 차정현; born January 4, 2002), known professionally as Song Si-an (송시안), is a South Korean actress. She made her acting debut in the 2021 television series Melancholia.

== Career ==
In 2020, Song was selected through KakaoM Actors 1st Class and subsequently signed an exclusive contract with Awesome ENT. In 2023, she signed an exclusive contract with Echo Global Group.

== Filmography ==
=== Television series ===
Year	Title	Role	Notes	Ref.
2021	Melancholia	young Ji Yoon-soo	Acting debut	
2021	KBS Drama Special - Oddinary	teen Kim Jae-hwa		
2023	Revenant	young Yeo Soo-ryeon		
2023	High Cookie	Seo Yoo-jung		
2024	Pyramid Game	Oh Seong-ah		
2025	My Troublesome Star	young Sa Seon-yeong		
2026	Teach You a Lesson	Choi Ji-seon		

=== Music video appearances ===
Year	Title	Artist	Ref.
2021	Poem for You	Kassy	
