= City Hunter (2011 TV series) =

2011 South Korean TV series

- Promotional poster
- Hangul: 시티헌터
- RR: Sitiheonteo
- MR: Sit'ihŏnt'ŏ
- Genre: Action; Thriller; Spy drama
- Based on: City Hunter by Tsukasa Hojo
- Written by: Hwang Eun-kyung; Choi Soo-jin
- Directed by: Jin Hyuk
- Starring: Lee Min-ho; Park Min-young; Lee Joon-hyuk; Kim Sang-joong; Hwang Sun-hee; Goo Hara; Chun Ho-jin
- Music by: Oh Jun-seong
- Opening theme: "It's Alright" by Yang Hwa-jin
- Ending theme: "Suddenly" by Kim bo-kyung
- Country of origin: South Korea
- Original language: Korean
- No. of episodes: 20

Production
- Executive producer: Kim Eui-joon
- Producers: Kim Young-sup; Sebastian Dong-hun Lee
- Production locations: South Korea; Thailand
- Running time: 70 minutes
- Production companies: SSD; Showbox; Apple Of The Eyes

Original release
- Network: SBS TV
- Release: May 25 – July 28, 2011

City Hunter (Korean: 시티헌터) is a 2011 South Korean television series based on the Japanese manga series of the same name written and illustrated by Tsukasa Hojo, starring Lee Min-ho, Park Min-young, Lee Joon-hyuk, Kim Sang-joong, Kim Sang-ho, Hwang Sun-hee, Goo Hara, Chun Ho-jin, and Lee Kwang-soo. It premiered on May 25, 2011, on SBS and finished broadcasting on July 28, 2011. The show was successful in Europe and paved way for Lee Min-ho's popularity in the region.

== Synopsis ==
In 1983, the South Korean President Chun Doo-hwan and his delegates are visiting Burma when a bomb planted by North Korean agents explodes, killing some high-ranking officials. This historical event is called the Rangoon bombing (also known as the Rangoon incident). To strike back, five South Korean officials plan a covert operation, codenamed "Operation Cleansweep", to enter North Korea and kill several top members of the North's high command. Lee Jin-pyo (Kim Sang-joong) and Park Moo-yeol (Park Sang-min), two Presidential Security Service bodyguards and best friends who were present at the bombing, organize a 21-man team for the mission. However, as the team wreaks havoc in Pyongyang, the five officials, by a majority decision of 4 to 1, abort the plan to avoid an international crisis if the mission is discovered. Their major concern is that the United States will withdraw its nuclear protection if the mission is made public. In light of Seoul's official declaration, it will not retaliate.

The operation is successful, but as the troops swim out from Nampo to an ROK Navy submarine assigned for their extraction, snipers aboard the submarine open fire on them. An already injured Park sacrifices his life to save Lee. Lee swims back to shore and returns to South Korea, where he finds out that the assault team's service and personal records have been erased.

Promising to avenge his fallen comrades, Jin-pyo kidnaps Mu-yeol's infant son and names him Lee Yoon-sung (Lee Min-ho). He flees to the Golden Triangle to raise the child as his own and trains the boy intensively in combat. Following an attack on a village they live in, Jin-pyo confesses his long-term plan for revenge to a teenaged Yoon-sung.

Seven years later, after successfully finishing his education and attaining a doctorate in the United States at the Massachusetts Institute of Technology, Yoon-sung returns to South Korea to fulfil his adoptive father's plan for revenge. He enters the Blue House as an IT expert under the National Communication Network Team. Jin-pyo warns him not to trust anyone and never fall in love, as doing so will put the people around him in danger.

While working at the Blue House, Lee meets bodyguard Kim Na-na (Park Min-young). Eventually, Na-na participates in his revenge plan, as they discover that they have the same goal in mind. Problems occur as Jin-pyo's revenge plot unfolds, especially when Lee defies his surrogate father on several occasions as they try to identify and kill the officials, known as the "Council of Five".

Each member of the Council has achieved significant wealth and political influence since 1983 and is engaged in various corruption levels. Jin-pyo and Yoon-sung's conflict stems primarily from Jin-pyo's wish to murder each official and Yoon-sung's wish to teach them a lesson and expose their corruption without killing them. As Yoon-sung exposes the officials' corruption, the citizens of Korea sense an unseen force of justice that they dub "City Hunter".

== Cast ==
=== Main ===
- Lee Min-ho as Lee Yoon-sung / Poochai / Choi Yoon-sung
  - Chae Sang-woo as young Yoon-sung / Poochai

Codenamed "City Hunter", Yoon-sung's ultimate goal is to avenge his father's killers. Using the identity of a Korean-American teenager named John Lee, who is later revealed to have died several years before, he assumes a double life by graduating from MIT with a doctorate degree and lands a job at South Korea's presidential palace. It led him to cross paths with presidential bodyguard Kim Na-na, with whom he falls in love. Unlike Jin-pyo, Yoon-sung does not desire taking lives and only hopes to bring the five murderers to justice by exposing their crimes and sending them to prison, which often made him go into conflicts with Jin-pyo, who wanted to kill the five men.

- Park Min-young as Kim Na-na

Forced to take care of herself at an early age after her mother was killed in a drunk driving crash and her father became comatose (Na-na's father never regained consciousness and he eventually died at the end of the series), she is independent and strong-willed. Her exceptional skills in martial arts eventually earns her an assignment with the Presidential Security Service. During her time as a bodyguard, she falls in love with Lee Yoon-sung and eventually discovers his real identity.

- Lee Joon-hyuk as Kim Young-joo

An intelligent prosecutor, Kim Young-joo possesses a strong sense of justice, even against the corrupt politicians of South Korea. He is the son of one of the members of the "Council of Five", and was ashamed of his father for his corruption and cover-up of the crash that killed Na-na's parents. Out of guilt, he helped Na-na to complete her education and ensure her stable employment as a bodyguard. He is a constant rival of City Hunter, working towards the same goals under legal cover, while trying to figure out his identity at the same time. He was later ruthlessly killed by Jae-man and his henchmen before he could arrest him, and before he died, he pleaded with Yoon-sung to forgive his father for his crime.

- Kim Sang-joong as Lee Jin-pyo

Operation Clean Sweep's sole survivor, Lee spends the mediate years in the Golden Triangle as a drug lord. Full of anger, he wants to kill all of the people who ordered his team dead. Under the alias Steve Lee, Jin-pyo pretends to be a Korean-American investor and uses Lee Yoon-sung as his agent of vengeance. Originally a good-natured person, he was gradually depicted as a murderous and merciless man who would do anything to achieve his goals of vengeance and had even targeted innocent people who got into his way. His notable victims include two of the "Council of Five" members: Lee Kyung-wan and Chun Jae-man.

- Kim Sang-ho as Bae Man-duk / Bae Shik-joong

A problem gambler but a very good cook whom Lee Yoon-sung saves from thugs in Thailand and later becomes his close friend. Over the course of the series, Bae and Lee become partners under Lee Jin-pyo's scheme – and also racks up huge debts buying stuff from the home-shopping network. However, it is revealed that Bae witnessed the crash that resulted in Kim Na-na's woes and was hiding in Thailand by the start of the series after being paid off by the culprit – Kim Jong-shik, a member of the Council of Five – to change his story. He regretted the cover-up despite having done it, and had wanted to make amends with Na-na, which he eventually did and Na-na also eventually forgave him.

- Hwang Sun-hee as Jin Sae-hee

A veterinarian by trade, Sae-hee is Young-joo's ex-wife and a good friend to the other characters. She is the first of Lee Yoon-sung's accomplices to learn of his secret identity as the City Hunter.

- Goo Hara as Choi Da-hye

One of President Choi's two children, Da-hye is smitten with Lee Yoon-sung early in the series and requests him to be her tutor. Her status of being the president's daughter does not win her any friends at school and even creates a public scandal when she attacks a group of girls who criticizes her father's governance within earshot. She decides not to go to college (because of her poor grades) and is forced to find a job, and later falls in love with Kim Young-joo. It was later revealed that she was Yoon-sung's biological half-sister, with the revelation of Yoon-sung's blood link with Choi.

- Chun Ho-jin as Choi Eung-chan

The incumbent president of South Korea, Choi was one of the five men involved in planning the 1983 operation and promised the unit he will help get them home. He was later out-voted in the decision to abort the operation and forced to live with the guilt for 28 years. He is the only member of the group who knows that Lee Jin-pyo survived the debacle, yet does nothing to stop him despite knowing that the former bodyguard's ultimate goal is to kill him and the other officials. It is later revealed that the president is Lee Yoon-sung's real father, who sired him with Lee Kyung-hee. He is depicted in the series as an idealist who believes the end is worth the means, which results in his impeachment by the National Assembly after he bribed a number of deputies to help pass an important education reform bill.

=== Supporting ===
- Park Sang-min as Park Moo-yeol

Lee Yoon-sung's father, who dies protecting Jin-pyo in the first episode. It is revealed that he is not Yoon-sung's real father, and was merely protecting Lee Kyung-hee after her affair with Choi Eung-chan ended. Park and Lee Jin-pyo's names are at the top of a memorial slab honoring the Clean Sweep team.

- Kim Mi-sook as Lee Kyung-hee

Lee Yoon-sung's mother, who went on to lead a solitary life running a small eatery after Yoon-sung was kidnapped as an infant. She had become pregnant with Choi Eung-chan's child, but when she decided to keep the baby, her life and the baby's was threatened by Chun Jae-man. She contracts leukemia later in the series, but starts to recover after Yoon-sung donates bone marrow to her. Kyung-hee travels to the United States with Shik-joong to start a new life in the final episode. Initially misled by Jin-pyo's lies, Yoon-sung believed that his mother abandoned him, until the truth came out.

- Lee Seung-hyung as Song Young-duk

The head of the Blue House's National Communications Network team.

- Yang Jin-sung as Shin Eun-ah

Kim Na-na's other female colleague in the PSS, who is assigned to look after Choi Da-hye.

- Lee Kwang-soo as Ko Ki-joon

Yoon-sung's colleague in the National Communications Network team who is visibly interested in Eun-ah. The couple are engaged at the end of the series. Ki-joon has a younger brother who served in the military but was crippled due to Seo Yong-hak engaging in corruption by supplying the military with poor quality boots, which caused Ki-joon's brother to suffer from a permanent leg injury.

- Jung Joon as Kim Sang-gook

A former police officer, Kim is tapped by Jin-pyo for the revenge project upon learning that his own brother was part of the 1983 operation. He was sacked from the force for breaking into the National Intelligence Service's files while trying to find out what happened to his brother. Eventually, after seeing Jin-pyo's true self and disagreeing with his extreme methods of revenge, he switched his allegiance to Yoon-sung and secretly helps him in the later part of the series.

- Lee Hyo-jung as Lee Kyung-wan

A senator, Kyung-wan is the City Hunter's first target among the Council of Five, who also pocketed certain children's welfare funds. He is imprisoned for the crime, but is implied to have died at Jin-pyo's hands in episode 9.

- Choi Jung-woo as Chun Jae-man

A businessman running a chaebol (a chemical company and hospital is seen in the series as part of it), Jae-man participated in planning the North Korea mission. He is the most corrupt and ruthless member of the Council of Five. He later burns a book containing all covert operations in 1983 that were supposed to be declassified in 2030. It is revealed that the book he burned was just a copy and Jin-pyo acquired the original document, but not before Jae-man does a little historical revisionism by saying that the operation took place because the team tried to defect to the North with some state secrets. His corruption case is also depicted as one that no government prosecutor wants to handle, as those who do take it on are often harassed into quitting. Chun dies at Jin-pyo's hands in the final episode.

- Choi Il-hwa as Kim Jong-shik

Kim Young-joo's father and a former education minister, Jong-shik was one of the officials who plotted the North Korea mission and agreed to the subsequent cover-up. He also killed Kim Na-na's mother and gravely injured her father while drunk-driving, and pays off a witness (Bae Shik-joong) to say that Na-na's parents were at fault for the crash. He showed no remorse of his crime, which made him even in odds with his son. He would become comatose later in the series as the City Hunter tries to take him down in light of an investigation over hiding around two billion won in college subsidies. He regains consciousness in the final episode to learn of his son's death.

- Choi Sang-hoon as Seo Yong-hak

A former defense minister and a prospective presidential contender, Yong-hak was an army general at the time of the 1983 operation and has often used his influence to have his three sons avoid the military's required three-year conscription. The City Hunter unmasks him for entering into deals to provide substandard combat boots and acquire defective fighters for the Air Force. As the truth behind Clean Sweep unravels, Yong-hak comes forward with what he knows and pins the president as the mastermind.

=== Special appearances ===
- Min Young-won as Min-hee
- Yoon Ye-hee as Mrs. Yong (First Lady)
- Kim Byung-choon as Jang Woo-hyun
- Shin Young-jin as Kim Mi-ok
- Kai Supranee as supporting Thai actress

== Original soundtrack ==
City Hunter OST

Soundtrack album by Various Artists
- Released: 2011
- Genre: Soundtrack
- Languages: Korean; English
- Labels: Sony Music; Glory MK Entertainment

=== Part 1 ===
Released on May 20, 2011
No.	Title	Artist	Length
1.	"Sarang (사랑)" (Love)	Yim Jae-beom	4:34
2.	"Sarang" (Inst.)		4:34
Total length:			8:38

=== Part 2 ===
Released on June 3, 2011
No.	Title	Artist	Length
1.	"So Goodbye"	Kim Jonghyun	4:12
2.	"It's Alright"	Yang Hwa-jin	3:47
Total length:			7:59

=== Part 3 ===
Released on June 10, 2011
No.	Title	Artist	Length
1.	"Cupid"	Girl's Day	3:38
2.	"Cupid (Acoustic ver.)"	Girl's Day	3:20
3.	"Cupid" (Inst.)		3:38
Total length:			10:56

=== Part 4 ===
Released on June 15, 2011
No.	Title	Artist	Length
1.	"Suddenly"	Kim Bo-kyung	3:42
2.	"Lonely Day"	J Symphony	3:40
Total length:			7:42

=== Part 5 ===
Released on June 23, 2011
No.	Title	Artist	Length
1.	"I Only Look at You"	Gyuri	4:12
2.	"I Only Look at You" (Inst.)		4:12
Total length:			8:24

=== Part 6 ===
Released on July 6, 2011
No.	Title	Artist	Length
1.	"You and I"	Rainbow	3:35
2.	"You and I" (Inst.)		3:35
Total length:			7:30

=== Part 7 ===
Released on July 20, 2011
No.	Title	Artist	Length
1.	"Can't Stop"	Son Han-byeol	3:32
2.	"I Love You, I Want You, I Need You"	Apple Mango	3:23
3.	"I Love You, I Want You, I Need You (Sweet Acoustic ver.)"	Hara	3:20
4.	"I Love You, I Want You, I Need You" (Inst.)		4:06
Total length:			14:35

Disc 2:
No.	Title	Artist	Length
1.	"A Hot Spade"	Oh Joon-sung	2:04
2.	"Aria of the City"	Oh Joon-sung	2:22
3.	"Attention"	Oh Joon-sung	1:47
4.	"Always Here"	Oh Joon-sung	1:41
5.	"Black Warrior"	Oh Joon-sung	1:52
6.	"City Hunter"	Oh Joon-sung	1:41
7.	"Dead or Live"	Oh Joon-sung	1:44
8.	"Deep Inside"	Oh Joon-sung	1:41
9.	"Eagle Eye"	Oh Joon-sung	1:50
10.	"Endless Cry"	Oh Joon-sung	2:07
11.	"Fire Flower"	Oh Joon-sung	2:08
12.	"Gun Fighter"	Oh Joon-sung	1:35
13.	"Glory of the City"	Oh Joon-sung	1:57
14.	"Kwang Hwa Moon"	Oh Joon-sung	2:46
15.	"Lair"	Oh Joon-sung	2:01
16.	"Mama's Cry"	Oh Joon-sung	1:29
17.	"Memories of Love (Acoustic Piano ver.)"	Kim Ji-soo	2:22
18.	"Memories of Love (Acoustic Guitar ver.)"	Park Joo-won	3:19
19.	"Middle point Symphony"	Oh Joon-sung	1:46
20.	"Morning Garden"	Oh Joon-sung	2:05
21.	"Nice Play"	Oh Joon-sung	1:44
22.	"NaNa's Theme"	Oh Joon-sung	2:21
23.	"Puchai Love"	Oh Joon-sung	2:47
24.	"Puchai Waltz"	Oh Joon-sung	1:59
25.	"Red Water"	Oh Joon-sung	1:43
26.	"Sad Run"	Oh Joon-sung	1:40
27.	"The Fire of Love"	Oh Joon-sung	1:43
28.	"Yellow Party"	Oh Joon-sung	1:55

== Reception ==
The series has received positive reviews and was also a commercial success selling out advertising space at a high price of ₩420 million ($420,000) per episode. By the end of its run in July 2011, the series had earned ₩10.45 billion ($10.45 million) from television advertising in South Korea.

Lee's role netted him Best Actor at the 4th Korea Drama Awards, as well as an endorser for the Hyundai Veloster in China. He would later be recognized by the Seoul Prosecutor's Office as an "Honorable Prosecutor" in a ceremony on January 4, 2012.

In between December 2011 and January 2012, the Asian-American Donor Program partnered with the Transplant Informers blog to run a special raffle for a full DVD boxed set of the series, as part of an awareness campaign for bone-marrow transplants. The promotion was held to recognize the show's authentic depiction of a bone-marrow transplant (when Yoon-sung had to donate some for his mother).

== Ratings ==
In the table below, the blue numbers represent the lowest ratings and the red numbers represent the highest ratings.

Ep.	Original broadcast date	Average audience share			
Ep.	Original broadcast date	Nielsen Korea		TNmS	
Ep.	Original broadcast date	Nationwide	Seoul	Nationwide	Seoul
1	May 25, 2011	10.5% (6th)	11.0% (7th)	9.5% (9th)	11.8% (6th)
2	May 26, 2011	11.1% (8th)	12.2% (7th)	10.0% (9th)	12.2% (7th)
3	June 1, 2011	12.3% (5th)	13.0% (5th)	11.9% (4th)	13.6% (5th)
4	June 2, 2011	12.8% (5th)	13.3% (5th)	12.6% (5th)	15.0% (4th)
5	June 8, 2011	13.7% (5th)	14.9% (4th)	13.0% (4th)	15.7% (3rd)
6	June 9, 2011	14.2% (4th)	14.8% (4th)	13.2% (4th)	15.4% (2nd)
7	June 15, 2011	13.7% (5th)	14.0% (5th)	13.6% (3rd)	16.7% (2nd)
8	June 16, 2011	13.8% (4th)	13.8% (5th)	12.7% (4th)	14.2% (2nd)
9	June 22, 2011	13.4% (5th)	13.4% (6th)	13.8% (4th)	15.2% (3rd)
10	June 23, 2011	14.6% (4th)	15.4% (5th)	14.4% (4th)	16.4% (3rd)
11	June 29, 2011	18.4% (1st)	19.4% (1st)	17.4% (3rd)	19.5% (1st)
12	June 30, 2011	18.8% (1st)	19.1% (1st)	18.3% (2nd)	20.5% (1st)
13	July 6, 2011	18.7% (1st)	19.8% (2nd)	18.5% (1st)	20.5% (1st)
14	July 7, 2011	19.6% (1st)	19.8% (1st)	18.3% (2nd)	20.6% (1st)
15	July 13, 2011	19.9% (1st)	20.5% (1st)	17.4% (3rd)	19.6% (1st)
16	July 14, 2011	19.2% (1st)	19.8% (1st)	17.5% (3rd)	18.8% (1st)
17	July 20, 2011	18.8% (1st)	19.7% (1st)	17.9% (2nd)	19.6% (1st)
18	July 21, 2011	19.3% (1st)	19.3% (1st)	18.6% (1st)	20.3% (1st)
19	July 27, 2011	18.8% (3rd)	19.0% (3rd)	17.2% (3rd)	18.7% (1st)
20	July 28, 2011	18.0% (1st)	20.0% (1st)	19.1% (3rd)	20.6% (1st)
Average		16.0%	16.6%	15.2%	17.2%

== Awards and nominations ==
Year	Award	Category	Recipient	Result
2011	4th Korea Drama Awards	Best Director	Jin Hyuk	Nominated
2011	4th Korea Drama Awards	Best Actor	Lee Min-ho	Won
2011	4th Korea Drama Awards	Best Actress	Park Min-young	Nominated
2011	4th Korea Drama Awards	Best Supporting Actor	Kim Sang-ho	Nominated
2011	4th Korea Drama Awards	Hallyu Star Award	Lee Min-ho	Won
2011	4th Korea Drama Awards	Best New Actress	Hwang Sun-hee	Nominated
2011	5th Mnet 20's Choice Awards	Hot Male Drama Star	Lee Min-ho	Nominated
2011	SBS Drama Awards	Top Excellence Award, Actor in a Drama Special	Lee Min-ho	Won
2011	SBS Drama Awards	Excellence Award, Actor in a Drama Special	Lee Joon-hyuk	Nominated
2011	SBS Drama Awards	Excellence Award, Actress in a Drama Special	Park Min-young	Nominated
2011	SBS Drama Awards	Special Acting Award, Actor in a Drama Special	Kim Sang-joong	Nominated
2011	SBS Drama Awards	Special Acting Award, Actor in a Drama Special	Chun Ho-jin	Nominated
2011	SBS Drama Awards	New Star Award	Goo Ha-ra	Won
2011	SBS Drama Awards	Top 10 Stars	Lee Min-ho	Won
2011	SBS Drama Awards	Popularity Award	Lee Min-ho	Won
2011	SBS Drama Awards	Popularity Award	Park Min-young	Nominated
2011	SBS Drama Awards	Best Couple Award	Lee Min-ho & Park Min-young	Nominated
2012	48th Baeksang Arts Awards	Popularity Award, Actor (TV)	Lee Min-ho	Nominated
2012	48th Baeksang Arts Awards	Popularity Award, Actress (TV)	Park Min-young	Nominated
2012	48th Baeksang Arts Awards	Popularity Award, Actress (TV)	Goo Ha-ra	Nominated
2012	7th Seoul International Drama Awards	Outstanding Korean Drama	City Hunter	Nominated
2012	7th Seoul International Drama Awards	Outstanding Korean Actor	Lee Min-ho	Nominated
2012	7th Seoul International Drama Awards	Popularity Award	Lee Min-ho	Nominated
