= Nam Hye-seung =

South Korean music director

- Citizenship: South Korea
- Education: Yonsei University – Classical composition
- Occupations: Composer; music director
- Years active: 1989–present

Korean name
- Hangul: 남혜승
- RR: Nam Hyeseung
- MR: Nam Hyesŭng

Nam Hye-seung (Korean: 남혜승) is a South Korean composer and music director. She is considered one of the best musicians in the country and is a fluent player of multiple musical instruments. Nam majoring in classical composition at Yonsei University.

Having mastered various genres of content, starting with entertainment in 1989, Nam Hye-seung has become a veteran in the industry. She began her career as an EBS broadcast music writer in 1989 and has since worked on numerous successful projects. Nam Hye-seung served as the music director for hit dramas such as Queen of Tears, Guardian: The Lonely and Great God, It's Okay to Not Be Okay, Crash Landing on You, and Mr. Sunshine, among others. Throughout her career, she has collaborated with renowned artists such as IU, Heize, BSS, EXO's Baekhyun and Chanyeol, Seventeen's Seungkwan, Mamamoo's Wheein, Lee Hi, and many more. With an impressive discography of 77 Korean dramas, Director Nam has established herself as one of the most sought-after composers in the Korean television industry.

== Career ==
In 1989, Nam stepped into the entertainment industry and started working on drama music after she happened to see an advertisement at the EBS education broadcasting station looking for someone to add music effects, so she applied and was accepted.

After joining EBS as a broadcast music writer in 1989, Nam worked on comedies and entertainment shows such as MBC's Sunday Night for more than 10 years, but then moved on to the children's program Kiss Kiss because she wanted to compose music. "There was a whole world in 'Kiss Kiss'. Animation, documentaries, dramatization… It was a great study." Her work includes animation, documentaries, sitcoms, and dramas. In particular, she attracted attention for working on polar opposite genres, such as the popular children's works Kobobobo, Pororo, and Special Case Task Force TEN.

Most children's programs copied Disney music and made it appropriate, however Nam's music was original. It was from this time that her name became known to broadcasters. She became a drama music director starting with the 2004 MBC series Red Bean Bread.

In 2005, Nam won the Music/Effects Award for her work in MBC at the 17th Korean Broadcasting Producer Awards.

Starting from that, numerous hits were born from her hands, such as The Good Wife and Don't Dare to Dream, as well as Nine, I Need Romance (2 and 3), and Discovery of Love.

== Filmography ==
Year	Title	Network	Ref.
2004	Red Bean Bread	MBC	
2005	Rules of Love (이별에 대처하는 우리의 자세)	MBC	
2010	More Charming by the Day	MBC	
2011	You Are So Pretty	MBC	
2011	Special Case Team TEN 1	OCN	
2011	Can't Lose	MBC	
2012	Operation Proposal	TV Chosun	
2012	Ice Adonis	tvN	
2012	Queen Inhyun's Man	tvN	
2012	I Need Romance 2012	tvN	
2012	Glass Mask	tvN	
2013	Flower Boy Next Door	tvN	
2013	Nine: Nine Times Time Travel	tvN	
2013	Special Affairs Team TEN 2	OCN	
2013	The Fugitive of Joseon	KBS2	
2013	Heartless City	JTBC	
2013	Hold My Hand	MBC	
2013	Your Neighbor's Wife	JTBC	
2014	I Need Romance 3	tvN	
2014	Angel Eyes	SBS	
2014	A Witch's Love	tvN	
2014	My Spring Days	KBS2	
2014	Discovery of Love	KBS2	
2014	The Three Musketeers	tvN	
2015	Love Weaves Through a Millenium	Hunan Television	
2015	Snow Road	KBS1	
2015	This is My Love	JTBC	
2015	My Beautiful Bride	OCN	
2015	My First Time	OnStyle	
2015	Bubble Gum	tvN	
2016	One More Happy Ending	MBC	
2016	Memory	tvN	
2016	The Good Wife	tvN	
2016	Jealousy Incarnate	SBS	
2016	Drama Special – The Red Teacher (Episode 1, Season 7)	KBS2	
2016	Guardian: The Lonely and Great God	tvN	
2017	Snowy Road		
2017	Chicago Typewriter	tvN	
2017	Suspicious Partner	SBS	
2017	The Bride of Habaek	tvN	
2017	Black	OCN	
2017	Just Between Lovers	JTBC	
2018	Drama Stage – Not Played (Episode 7, Season 1)	tvN	
2018	Wok of Love	SBS	
2018	Life on Mars	OCN	
2018	Mr. Sunshine	tvN	
2018	Where Stars Land	tvN	
2018	Encounter	tvN	
2019	Romance Is A Bonus Book	tvN	
2019	He Is Psychometric	tvN	
2019	Beautiful World	JTBC	
2019	Vagabond	SBS	
2019	Crash Landing on You	tvN	
2020	A Piece of Your Mind	tvN	
2020	It's Okay to Not Be Okay	tvN	
2020	Record of Youth	tvN	
2020	Lovestruck in the City	KakaoTV	
2021	Reflection of You	JTBC	
2021	Bulgasal: Immortal Souls	tvN	
2021	Our Beloved Summer	SBS	
2022	Link: Eat, Love, Kill	tvN	
2022	Alchemy of Souls	tvN	
2023	Our Blooming Youth	tvN	
2023	Doona!	Netflix	
2023	Sweet HomeSeason 2	Netflix	
2024	Tell Me That You Love Me	ENA	
2024	Queen of Tears	tvN	
2025	When the Stars Gossip	tvN	
2025	Our Unwritten Seoul	tvN	
2025	The Price of Confession	Netflix, Inc.	
2026	Still Shining	JTBC	

== Accolades ==
Awards and nominations
Year	Award	Category	Nominee(s)	Result	Ref.
2005	17th Korean Broadcasting Producer Awards	Music/Effects Award	Works in MBC	Won	
2018	11th Korea Drama Awards	Best Original Soundtrack	"Days Without Tears" (vocal by Kim Yoon-ah)	Nominated	
2020	30th Seoul Music Awards	OST Award	"Flower" (vocal by Yoon Mi-rae)	Nominated	
2020	2020 Mnet Asian Music Awards	Best OST	"Here I Am Again" (vocal by Baek Yerin)	Nominated	
2021	30th Seoul Music Awards	OST Award	"Here I Am Again" (vocal by Baek Yerin)	Nominated	
2021	30th Seoul Music Awards	OST Award	"Give You My Heart" (vocal by IU)	Nominated	
2024	Korea Drama Awards	Best OST Award	"More Than Enough" (Kim Tae-rae (Zerobaseone)) from "Queen of Tears"	Won	
2024	2024 K-World Dream Awards	Best OST	"Love You With All My Heart" (Crush) from "Queen of Tears"	Won	
2024	2024 MAMA Awards	Best OST	"Love You With All My Heart" (Crush) from "Queen of Tears"	Won	
2024	Seoul International Drama Awards	Outstanding K-Drama OST	"The Reasons of My Smiles" (BSS) from "Queen of Tears"	Won	
2025	39th Golden Disc Awards	Best OST	"Love You With All My Heart" (Crush) from "Queen of Tears"	Won	
