= Aishiteiru to Itte Kure =

Japanese television series

- Japanese: 愛していると言ってくれ
- Literally: Tell Me That You Love Me
- Genre: Romance
- Written by: Eriko Kitagawa
- Directed by: Jiro Shono; Nobuhiro Doi; Katsuo Fukuzawa
- Starring: Etsushi Toyokawa; Takako Tokiwa; Akiko Yada; Isao Hashizume; Miyoko Akaza
- Music by: Masato Nakamura
- Opening theme: "Love Love Love" by Dreams Come True
- Country of origin: Japan
- Original language: Japanese
- No. of episodes: 12

Production
- Producer: Seiichiro Kijima
- Running time: 60 minutes

Original release
- Network: TBS
- Release: July 7 – September 22, 1995

Related
- Tell Me That You Love Me

Aishiteiru to Itte Kure (愛していると言ってくれ) is a Japanese television drama which was aired on TBS from July 7 to September 22, 1995. It was the number one Japanese drama that year, and led to a brief fad of interest in Japanese Sign Language.

== Synopsis ==
Hiroko, a young actress living in Tokyo, meets Koji one day when attempting to grab an apple from a tree in the neighborhood and he plucks it out for her. The two meet again and again in the park until one time, when she is practicing a role in the park, she learns from a child that Koji can neither speak nor hear. From this point on, the two begin to grow closer together and Hiroko even learns Japanese Sign Language to understand Koji better. She starts to develop feelings for him.

== Cast ==
- Toyokawa Etsushi as Koji Sakaki
- Takako Tokiwa as Hiroko Mizuno
- Koki Okada as Kenichi Yabe
- Ranran Suzuki as Maki Yoshida
- Kimiko Yo as Kaoru Kanzaki
- Akiko Yada as Shiori Sakaki
- Yumi Asō as Hikaru Shimada

== Adaptation ==
The South Korean remake titled Tell Me That You Love Me, starring Jung Woo-sung and Shin Hyun-been premiered on November 27, 2023 on ENA, and is also be available for streaming on Genie TV.

== Accolades ==
Award	Category	Recipient(s)	Result	Ref.
5th TV Life Annual Drama Awards	Best Series	Tell Me That You Love Me	Won	
5th TV Life Annual Drama Awards	Best Actor	Etsushi Toyokawa	Won	
5th TV Life Annual Drama Awards	Best Theme Song	Love Love Love	Won	
