= I'm Solo: Love Continues =

South Korean reality television show

- Promotional poster
- Also known as: Nasolsagye
- Hangul: 나는 SOLO, 그 후 사랑은 계속된다
- RR: Naneun SOLO, geu hu sarangeun gyesokdoenda
- MR: Nanŭn SOLO, kŭ hu sarangŭn kyesoktoenda
- Genre: Reality television
- Directed by: Nam Gyu-hong
- Starring: Defconn; Gyeongree; Yoon Bo-mi; Jo Hyun-ah
- Country of origin: South Korea
- Original language: Korean

Production
- Producer: Nam Gyu-hong
- Camera setup: Multi-camera
- Running time: 80 minutes
- Production companies: ENA, SBS Plus

Original release
- Network: ENA, SBS Plus
- Release: August 11, 2022 – present

Related
- I'm Solo (Original show)

I'm Solo: Love Continues (Korean: 나는 SOLO, 그 후 사랑은 계속된다) is a South Korean reality television show distributed by ENA and SBS Plus. It is a spin-off of the popular dating reality show, I'm Solo. The show premiered on August 11, 2022, and airs every Thursday at 22:30 (KST).

== Synopsis ==
The official introduction describes the program as an "after-service" for notable cast members from the original series. The show's premise is built on the concept that "love continues even outside Solo Land." It aims to facilitate meetings not only between cast members of the same season but also arranges cross-season encounters, often described by the production team as a "grand unification of the Solo universe."

== Format ==
While the original show, Im Solo, focuses on single men and women meeting for the first time to find love, I'm Solo: Love Continues (often referred to as 'Nasolsagye') features the stories of the cast members after they have left "Solo Land." It showcases their renewed attempts to find love. Additionally, the show shares the post-marriage lives of couples who successfully married through the franchise, or provides brief updates on participants at the end of episodes.

The series typically progresses in two main arcs:

- Bridge Episodes: These episodes document the post-broadcast lives of cast members from I Am Solo. They primarily focus on the stories of those who became couples through the show.
- Solo Guesthouse (Solo Minbak): In this format, cast members from various seasons who did not become couples are invited to live together at a guesthouse for several days. Here, they strive to find a romantic connection once again.

== Cast ==
The show is hosted by a panel of MCs who watch the footage and provide commentary.

- Defconn
- Yoon Bo-mi (Apink)
- Gyeongree (Nine Muses)

Former Cast

- Jo Hyun-ah (Urban Zakapa): She was one of the original hosts but stepped down from the position due to scheduling conflicts.

== Episodes ==
Year	Number of Episodes	Broadcast Date	
Year	Number of Episodes	First aired	Last aired
2022	15	August 11, 2022	November 17, 2022
2023	26	July 6, 2023	December 28, 2023
2024	52	January 4, 2024	December 26, 2024
2025	TBA	January 2, 2025	TBA

== Production ==
The series is directed by Nam Gyu-hong, the chief producer who created the original show, I'm Solo. Known for his "hyper-realistic" directing style, Nam captures the raw emotions and unscripted interactions of the cast members. The spin-off was produced in response to high viewer demand to see updates on popular contestants following their appearance on the original broadcast.

== Reception ==
Upon its release, the show received positive responses. On May 29, it recorded a combined viewership rating of 2.6% (sum of ENA and SBS Plus) for paid households in the Seoul metropolitan area, peaking at 3.2% per minute, according to Nielsen Korea.

Notably, in the FUNdex chart for the fourth week of May compiled by Good Data Corporation, the show ranked 6th in the non-drama category—while the original series I'm Solo took 1st place—establishing itself as a strong contender in Thursday night entertainment.
