= Mother and Mom =

South Korean television series

- Promotional poster
- Hangul: 라이딩 인생
- Lit.: Riding Life
- RR: Raiding insaeng
- MR: Raiding insaeng
- Genre: Family drama
- Written by: Sung Yoon-ah; Jo Won-dong
- Directed by: Kim Chul-gyu
- Starring: Jeon Hye-jin; Jo Min-su; Jung Jin-young; Jeon Seok-ho
- Music by: tearliner
- Country of origin: South Korea
- Original language: Korean
- No. of episodes: 8

Production
- Running time: 60 minutes
- Production companies: Betty & Creators

Original release
- Network: ENA; Genie TV
- Release: March 3 – March 25, 2025

Mother and Mom (Korean: 라이딩 인생) is a 2025 South Korean family drama television series co-written by Sung Yoon-ah and Jo Won-dong, directed by Kim Chul-gyu, and starring Jeon Hye-jin, Jo Min-su, Jung Jin-young, and Jeon Seok-ho. It aired on ENA from March 3, to March 25, 2025, at 22:00 (KST), and subsequently streaming on Genie TV.

== Synopsis ==
The drama depicts the 'worrying' Daechi-dong life of three generations of women, centered on a passionate working mom Jung Eun who entrusts her daughter's '7-year examination' riding to her mom Jia, as they prepare for the entrance test to enter a famous English academy. The drama vividly highlights the early childhood private education scene, drawing attention.

== Cast and characters ==
- Jeon Hye-jin as Lee Jung-eun

A determined marketer for the beauty sector who also wants to continue her daughter's schooling at the age of seven. She grew up early to help her busy mother, and now that she is married and has a daughter, she becomes enraged with her mother in ways she has never done before.

- Jo Min-su as Yoon Ji-ah

A university hospital pediatric art therapist who brought up her daughter Jung-eun by herself without a spouse.

- Jung Jin-young as Lee Young-wook

- Jeon Seok-ho as Hong Jae-man

Jung-eun's husband.

- Park Bo-kyung as Song Ho-gyeong
- Park Soo-yeon

== Viewership ==
Mother and Mom : South Korea viewers per episode (thousands)

| Season | Episode number | | | | | | | | Average |
| Season | 1 | 2 | 3 | 4 | 5 | 6 | 7 | 8 | Average |
|---|---|---|---|---|---|---|---|---|---|
| 1 | N/A | 369 | 412 | 556 | 462 | 514 | 367 | 687 | TBD |

Source: Audience measurement performed nationwide by Nielsen Korea.

Average TV viewership ratings
| Ep. | Original broadcast date | Average audience share | |
| Ep. | Original broadcast date | Nielsen Korea (Nielsen Korea) | |
| Ep. | Original broadcast date | Nationwide | Seoul |
|---|---|---|---|
| 1 | March 3, 2025 | 1.2% (14th) | —N/a |
| 2 | March 4, 2025 | 1.622% (5th) | 1.746% (4th) |
| 3 | March 10, 2025 | 1.849% (2nd) | 1.799% (2nd) |
| 4 | March 11, 2025 | 2.358% (3rd) | 2.323% (3rd) |
| 5 | March 17, 2025 | 2.132% (2nd) | 2.304% (2nd) |
| 6 | March 18, 2025 | 2.633% (2nd) | 2.538% (3rd) |
| 7 | March 24, 2025 | 1.794% (3rd) | 2.099% (3rd) |
| 8 | March 25, 2025 | 3.258% (1st) | 3.121% (1st) |
| Average | | _ | _ |
In the table above, the blue numbers represent the lowest ratings and the red numbers represent the highest ratings.
