= Summer Strike =

2022 South Korean television series

- Promotional poster
- Hangul: 아무것도 하고 싶지 않아
- Lit.: I Don't Feel Like Doing Anything
- RR: Amugeotdo hago sipji ana
- MR: Amugŏtto hago sipchi ana
- Genre: Melodrama; Romance; Slice-of-life
- Based on: I Don't Feel Like Doing Anything by Joo Young-hyun
- Written by: Hong Moon-pyo; Lee Yoon-jung
- Directed by: Lee Yoon-jung; Hong Moon-pyo
- Starring: Kim Seol-hyun; Im Si-wan
- Music by: Tearliner
- Country of origin: South Korea
- Original language: Korean
- No. of episodes: 12

Production
- Executive producers: Lee Joo-ho; Lee Joon-hee (CP)
- Producers: Lee Dong-kyu; Kim Eun-seon; Jeong Da-sol
- Running time: 45 minutes
- Production company: GTist

Original release
- Network: ENA
- Release: November 21 – December 27, 2022

Summer Strike (Korean: 아무것도 하고 싶지 않아) is a 2022 South Korean television series starring Kim Seol-hyun and Im Si-wan. It is based on a webtoon of the same Korean title by writer Joo Young-hyun. The series is an original drama of Genie TV, and is available for streaming on its platform and on OTT media service Seezn. It also aired on ENA from November 21 to December 27, 2022, every Monday and Tuesday at 21:20 (KST).

== Synopsis ==
Summer Strike is about people who start finding themselves after leaving their lifestyles in a complicated city, and moving to an unfamiliar place to do nothing.

== Cast ==
=== Main ===
- Kim Seol-hyun as Lee Yeo-reum: a 28-year-old woman who decides to quit her job of five years and move to a small seaside town called Angok.
- Im Si-wan as Ahn Dae-beom: a librarian at Angok Library who is a physics genius.

=== Supporting ===
- Shin Eun-soo as Kim Bom
- Bang Jae-min as Heo Jae-hoon
- Park Ye-young as Jo Ji-young
- Kwak Min-gyu as Bae Sung-min
- Kim Joon as Bae Joon

=== Extended ===
- Park Ok-chul as Song Ok-soon
- Kim Yo-han as Hwang Geun-ho
- Oh Yong as Chang-su
- Im Jae-hyuk as Dae-ho
- Park Ji-hoon

== Production ==
The series is co-written and co-directed by Lee Yoon-jung and Hong Moon-pyo.

The first script reading of the cast was held in April 2022. Filming was conducted for six months in several locations including Gurye, Gokseong, and Namhae.

== Ratings ==
Average TV viewership ratings
Ep.	Original broadcast date	Average audience share (Nielsen Korea)	
Ep.	Original broadcast date	Nationwide	Seoul
1	November 21, 2022	0.633%	N/A
2	November 22, 2022	0.655%	N/A
3	November 28, 2022	0.697%	N/A
4	November 29, 2022	0.657%	N/A
5	December 5, 2022	0.7%	N/A
6	December 6, 2022	0.8%	N/A
7	December 12, 2022	1.197%	1.382%
8	December 13, 2022	1.1%	1.201%
9	December 19, 2022	0.9%	N/A
10	December 20, 2022	0.9%	1.179%
11	December 26, 2022	1.1%	1.352%
12	December 27, 2022	1.0%	1.413%
Average		0.866%	— (Note: Due to some unpublished ratings, the exact average rating is unknown.)
In the table above, the blue numbers represent the lowest published ratings and the red numbers represent the highest published ratings.; N/A denotes rating that was not released.; This series aired on a cable channel/pay TV which normally has a relatively smaller audience compared to free-to-air TV/public broadcasters (KBS, SBS, MBC and EBS).

== Accolades ==
Name of the award ceremony, year presented, category, nominee(s) of the award, and the result of the nomination
Award ceremony	Year	Category	Nominee / Work	Result	Ref.
LA Web Fest	2023	Best Actress – Long Form Series	Kim Seol-hyun	Won	
LA Web Fest	2023	Best Series – Long Form	Summer Strike	Nominated	
LA Web Fest	2023	Best Creator / Director / Writer	Lee Yoon-jung, Hong Moon-pyo	Nominated	
LA Web Fest	2023	Best Actor – Long Form Series	Im Si-wan	Nominated	
