= Brewing Love =

2024 South Korean television series

- Promotional poster
- Hangul: 취하는 로맨스
- Lit.: Drunken Romance
- RR: Chwihaneun romaenseu
- MR: Ch'wihanŭn romaensŭ
- Genre: Romance
- Written by: Lee Jung-shin, PN
- Directed by: Park Sun-ho
- Starring: Kim Se-jeong; Lee Jong-won; Shin Do-hyun; Baek Sung-chul
- Music by: Park Se-joon
- Country of origin: South Korea
- Original language: Korean
- No. of episodes: 12

Production
- Executive producer: Hong Sung-chang
- Running time: 60 minutes
- Production company: Studio S

Original release
- Network: ENA; Genie TV
- Release: November 4 – December 10, 2024

Brewing Love (Korean: 취하는 로맨스) is a 2024 South Korean television series starring Kim Se-jeong, Lee Jong-won, Shin Do-hyun, and Baek Sung-chul. It aired on ENA from November 4, to December 10, 2024, every Monday and Tuesday at 22:00 (KST), and subsequently streaming on Genie TV. It is also available for streaming on Netflix in South Korea, and Viki and Viu in selected regions.

== Cast and characters ==
=== Main ===
- Kim Se-jeong as Chae Young-ju
- Lee Jong-won as Yoon Min-ju

A brewery owner and also a brewmaster.

- Shin Do-hyun as Bang A-reum
- Baek Sung-chul as Oh Chan-hwi

A former Special Forces soldier who is Young-ju's close friend.

=== Supporting ===
- Ha Min-hyuk as Sim Ra-oh

An employee of the planning team at a liquor company.

- Park Ji-ah as Sim Young-ja
- Baek Hyun-joo as Go Sook-ja
- Ko Ho-jung as the youngest member of Young-ju's team
- Lee Ki-young as Yoon Chang-sook, Min-ju's father.

== Viewership ==
Brewing Love : South Korea viewers per episode (thousands)

| Season | Episode number | | | | | | | | | | | | Average |
| Season | 1 | 2 | 3 | 4 | 5 | 6 | 7 | 8 | 9 | 10 | 11 | 12 | Average |
|---|---|---|---|---|---|---|---|---|---|---|---|---|---|
| 1 | 351 | 422 | 404 | 451 | 337 | 419 | 410 | 375 | 341 | 321 | 361 | 347 | 378 |

Source: Audience measurement performed nationwide by Nielsen Korea.

Average TV viewership ratings
| Ep. | Original broadcast date | Average audience share (Nielsen Korea) | |
| Ep. | Original broadcast date | Nationwide | Seoul |
|---|---|---|---|
| 1 | November 4, 2024 | 1.876% (3rd) | 1.868% (4th) |
| 2 | November 5, 2024 | 2.025% (4th) | 1.807% (4th) |
| 3 | November 11, 2024 | 1.815% (3rd) | 1.791% (3rd) |
| 4 | November 12, 2024 | 2.145% (2nd) | 2.021% (3rd) |
| 5 | November 18, 2024 | 1.484% (5th) | 1.415% (6th) |
| 6 | November 19, 2024 | 1.947% (4th) | 2.100% (4th) |
| 7 | November 25, 2024 | 1.890% (2nd) | 1.802% (3rd) |
| 8 | November 26, 2024 | 1.799% (4th) | 1.676% (4th) |
| 9 | December 2, 2024 | 1.826% (3rd) | 1.675% (4th) |
| 10 | December 3, 2024 | 1.678% (5th) | 1.456% (5th) |
| 11 | December 9, 2024 | 1.648% (7th) | 1.688% (5th) |
| 12 | December 10, 2024 | 1.774% (5th) | 1.521% (6th) |
| Average | | 1.826% | 1.735% |
In the table above, the blue numbers represent the lowest ratings and the red numbers represent the highest ratings.; This drama aired on a cable channel/pay TV which normally has a relatively smaller audience compared to free-to-air TV/public broadcasters (KBS, SBS, MBC, and EBS).
