= Lee Suk-hyeong =

South Korean actor (born 1978)

- 이석형
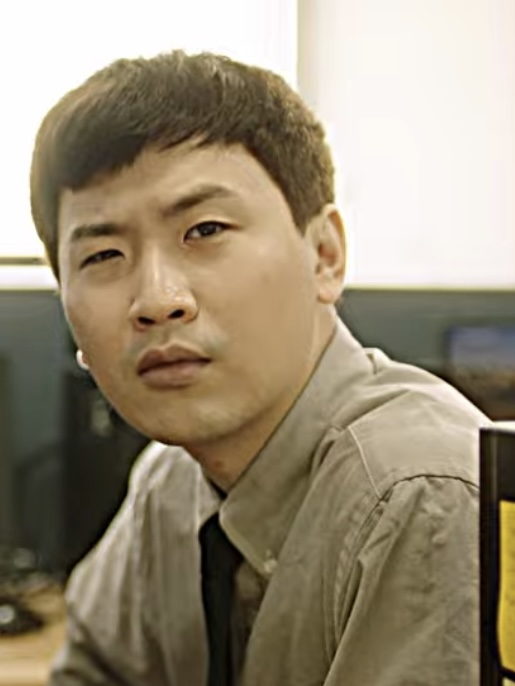
- Lee in 2022
- Born: July 19, 1995 (age 31); South Korea
- Other name: Lee Suk-hyung
- Occupation: Actor
- Years active: 2014–present
- Agent: Noon Company
- Known for: Jane of Dreams; Hometown Cha-Cha-Cha; Link: Eat, Love, Kill

Korean name
- Hangul: 이석형
- RR: I Seokhyeong
- MR: I Sŏkhyŏng

Lee Suk-hyeong (Korean: 이석형; born July 29, 1978) is a South Korean actor. He debuted in 2014 with the indie film Today's Movie. He gained recognition in the independent film industry through his roles in Jane of Dreams (2017) and Heart (2020), and was awarded the Korean Fantastic: Actor Award in the Feature section at the 25th Bucheon International Fantastic Film Festival for his first feature film, Action Hero (2020), which led him named as blue chip in the independent film industry. He gained wider recognition for his role in tvN drama series Hometown Cha-Cha-Cha.

== Early life ==
Lee initially dreamed of becoming a cartoonist, drawn to the creative aspect of the field. However, after reading about the challenging realities of a cartoonist's life, he shifted his interest to film, aspiring to be a director. He eventually had the opportunity to direct a film, but subsequently lost confidence in his ability to continue in that role, leading him to pursue acting.

== Career ==
Lee debuted in 2014 with the indie film Today's Movie. In 2017, Lee was featured in the film Jane of Dreams, which first screened at the Busan International Film Festival. He portrayed Byeong-wook, the leader of Pam, who attempts to maintain their precarious community with a tyrannical attitude, yet his eyes betray an anxiety that Pam members will dislike him.

Lee enlisted in the military after filming Jane of Dreams. Immediately following his discharge, he filmed Heart, portraying the main character, Seongbeom. Heart was officially invited to the "Korean Cinema Today-Vision" section of the 2019 Busan International Film Festival. Lee stated that filming occurred during a period of extreme tension for him, a crossroads between returning to civilian life or continuing as an actor.In October 2019, Lee signed an exclusive contract with Noon Company.

In 2020, Lee acted in the independent action film Action Hero (2020), directed by Lee Jin-ho. For this role, he won the Korean Fantastic: Actor Award in the Feature section at the 25th Bucheon International Fantastic Film Festival, which led him named as blue chip in the independent film independent film industry.

In 2021, Lee appeared as Kim Do-ha in the tvN drama series Hometown Cha-Cha-Cha (2021). Followed by another supporting role in Link: Eat, Love, Kill (2022), as Cha Jin-ho, a junior chef of protagonist Eun Gye-hoon. In Juvenile Justice (2022), Lee was cast as Lee Nam-kyung, a boy who appears in court for a traffic accident involving an unlicensed minor.

== Filmography ==
=== Film ===
List of film(s)
| Year | Title | | Role | Notes | Ref. |
| Year | English | Korean | Role | Notes | Ref. |
|---|---|---|---|---|---|
| 2015 | Today's Movie | 오늘영화 | Jeon Ji-hyun's men | | |
| 2017 | Jane of Dreams | 꿈의 제인 | Byeong-wook | | |
| 2020 | Heart | 하트 | Sung Beom | | |
| 2021 | Action Hero | 액션히어로 | Joo Seong | | |
| 2021 | Ghost Mansion | 괴기맨숀 | Mold Young Man | | |
| 2022 | Love and Leashes | 모럴센스 | Woo-hyuk | | |

=== Television ===
Key
| † | Denotes television productions that have not yet been released |

List of television drama(s)
| Year | Title | | Role | Notes | Ref. |
| Year | English | Korean | Role | Notes | Ref. |
|---|---|---|---|---|---|
| 2021 | Drama Stage – Mint Condition | 드라마 스테이지 – 민트 컨디션 | Ix | KBS one episode drama | |
| 2021 | Racket Boys | 라켓소년단 | Lee Kyung-min | | |
| 2021 | Hometown Cha-Cha-Cha | 갯마을 차차차 | Kim Do-ha | | |
| 2022 | Link: Eat, Love, Kill | 링크: 먹고, 사랑하라, 죽이게 | Cha Jin-ho | | |
| 2026 | Between Steps | 연애박사 | Bae Chan-soo | | |

=== Web series ===
List of web drama(s)
| Year | Title | | Role | Notes | Ref. |
| Year | English | Korean | Role | Notes | Ref. |
|---|---|---|---|---|---|
| 2020 | The School Nurse Files | 보건교사 안은영 | Kang Min-woo | Netflix Original Series | |
| 2020 | Lovestruck in the City | 도시남녀의 사랑법 | Kang Byung-jun | KakaoTV Original Series, distributed by Netflix | |
| 2022 | Juvenile Justice | 소년심판 | Lee Nam-kyung | Netflix Original Series | |
| 2022 | Pleasant Bullying | 유쾌한 왕따 | | | |

== Award ==
List of Award(s)
| Award | Year | Category | Recipient | Result | Ref. |
|---|---|---|---|---|---|
| 25th Bucheon International Fantastic Film Festival | 2021 | Fantastic Actor Award | Lee Suk-hyeong (Action Hero) | Won | |
