= Tell Me That You Love Me (TV series) =

2023–2024 South Korean television series

- Promotional poster
- Also known as: Tell Me You Love Me
- Hangul: 사랑한다고 말해줘
- RR: Saranghandago malhae jwo
- MR: Saranghandago marhae chwŏ
- Genre: Romance; Melodrama
- Based on: Aishiteiru to Itte Kure by Eriko Kitagawa
- Developed by: KT Studio Genie (planning)
- Written by: Kim Min-jung
- Directed by: Kim Yoon-jin
- Starring: Jung Woo-sung; Shin Hyun-been
- Music by: Nam Hye-seung
- Country of origin: South Korea
- Original language: Korean
- No. of episodes: 16

Production
- Executive producers: Kim Woo-taek; Jung Woo-sung; Lee Jung-jae
- Producers: Kim Seung-min; Park Jae-seop; Kim Jun-seong; Lee Da-yeon
- Running time: 60 minutes
- Production companies: KT Studio Genie; Studio&NEW; Artist Studio

Original release
- Network: ENA
- Release: November 27, 2023 – January 16, 2024

Tell Me That You Love Me (Korean: 사랑한다고 말해줘) is a South Korean television series based on the 1995 Japanese TV series Aishiteiru to Itte Kure, and starring Jung Woo-sung and Shin Hyun-been. It is an original drama of Genie TV, and available for streaming on its platform, and on Disney+ in selected regions. It also aired on ENA from November 27, 2023 to January 16, 2024, every Monday and Tuesday at 21:00 (KST).

== Synopsis ==
The series is about the romance between a hard-of-hearing painter who is used to express his emotions through drawings rather than words, and an aspiring actress who expresses her feelings with her voice.

== Cast ==
=== Main ===
- Jung Woo-sung as Cha Jin-woo: a deaf artist who lost his hearing when he was young and has been living a secluded life, but feels freedom in his own quiet world and is easygoing despite the prejudice against him.
  - Baek Sung-chul as young Cha Jin-woo
- Shin Hyun-been as Jung Mo-eun: a woman who has self-respect as she proudly fulfills her dreams and love.

=== Supporting ===
==== People around Jin-woo ====
- Kim Ji-hyun as Song Seo-kyung: Jin-woo's college classmate and ex-lover who is the director of an art center.
  - Lee Eun-jae as young Song Seo-kyung
- Park Ki-deok as Kwon Do-hoon: Jin-woo and Seo-kyung's college classmate who is a famous painter.
- Heo Jun-seok as Hong Ki-hyun: Jin-woo's friend who runs a bar.
- Jung Sae-byeol as Eun So-hee: Ki-hyun's wife.

==== People around Mo-eun ====
- Lee Jae-kyoon as Yoon Jo-han: Mo-eun's high school classmate who is a composer and music producer.
- Park Jin-joo as Oh Ji-yu: Mo-eun's best friend and roommate who is an art center employee.
- Shin Jae-hwi as Jung Mo-dam: Mo-eun's younger brother who is a fitness trainer.
- Kang Shin-il as Jung Ji-pyeong: Mo-eun and Mo-dam's father.
- Kim Mi-kyung as Na Ae-sook: Mo-eun and Mo-dam's mother.

=== Extended ===
- Son So-mang as Lee Eun-soo: Seo-kyung's colleague who is a curator at an art center.
- Bae Jae-sung as Kang Si-hoo: Jin-woo's student.

== Production ==
=== Filming ===
Filming of the series was scheduled to begin at the end of 2022. It was reported that the series completed filming on October 30, 2023.

=== Controversy ===
In June 2023, the production team of Tell Me That You Love Me issued an apology following a call-out post on an online community stating that the surrounding area was not cleaned up after filming the series.

== Viewership ==
Tell Me That You Love Me : South Korea viewers per episode (thousands)

Season	Episode number																Average
Season	1	2	3	4	5	6	7	8	9	10	11	12	13	14	15	16	Average
1	313	331	328	335	374	294	N/A	N/A	N/A	N/A	366	N/A	343	286	336	411	N/A

Source: Audience measurement performed nationwide by Nielsen Korea.

Average TV viewership ratings
Ep.	Original broadcast date	Average audience share (Nielsen Korea)	
Ep.	Original broadcast date	Nationwide	Seoul
1	November 27, 2023	1.515% (4th)	1.818% (4th)
2	November 28, 2023	1.800% (3rd)	2.031% (3rd)
3	December 4, 2023	1.678% (4th)	1.721% (4th)
4	December 5, 2023	1.989% (3rd)	2.125% (3rd)
5	December 11, 2023	1.902% (4th)	2.096% (3rd)
6	December 12, 2023	1.757% (3rd)	2.102% (3rd)
7	December 18, 2023	1.88% (2nd)	N/A
8	December 19, 2023	1.597% (3rd)	N/A
9	December 25, 2023	1.904% (5th)	N/A
10	December 26, 2023	2.125% (2nd)	N/A
11	January 1, 2024	1.596% (11th)	1.763% (8th)
12	January 2, 2024	1.495% (16th)	1.615% (8th)
13	January 8, 2024	1.644% (3rd)	2.011% (3rd)
14	January 9, 2024	1.532% (5th)	1.799% (3rd)
15	January 15, 2024	1.607% (5th)	1.884% (4th)
16	January 16, 2024	1.762% (5th)	2.091% (4th)
Average		1.736%	— (Note: Due to multiple unpublished ratings, the exact average rating is unknown.)
In the table above, the blue numbers represent the lowest ratings and the red numbers represent the highest ratings.; N/A denotes ratings that were not published or unknown.; This series aired on a cable channel/pay TV which normally has a relatively smaller audience compared to free-to-air TV/public broadcasters (KBS, SBS, MBC and EBS).
