= Dream to You =

2026 South Korean television series

- Promotional poster
- Hangul: 그대에게 드림
- RR: Geudaeege deurim
- MR: Kŭdaeege tŭrim
- Genre: Romantic comedy
- Written by: Jung Eun-bi
- Directed by: Yoo Sun-dong
- Starring: Hwang In-youp; Lee Hye-ri; Baek Sung-chul; Lee Yul-eum
- Country of origin: South Korea
- Original language: Korean
- No. of episodes: 12

Production
- Production company: Contents Planner (Note: A subsidiary of Studio SuperPick)

Original release
- Network: ENA; Genie TV
- Release: July 13 – August 18, 2026

Dream to You (Korean: 그대에게 드림) is a South Korean romantic comedy television series written by Jung Eun-bi, directed by Yoo Sun-dong, starring Hwang In-youp, Lee Hye-ri, Baek Sung-chul, and Lee Yul-eum. The series follows Woo Soo-bin, a film director who has achieved his dream, and Joo Yi-jae, a reporter struggling to make a living who has forgotten her dream, as they reunite 15 years later. It aired on ENA from July 13 to August 18, 2026, every Monday and Tuesday at 22:00 (KST). It is also subsequently streaming on Genie TV in South Korea, and on Viu in selected regions.

== Synopsis ==
Dream to You follows Woo Soo-bin, who returns to rediscover himself, and Joo Yi-jae, who was once fearless and ambitious, but has become more cautious due to life's experiences.

== Cast and characters ==
=== Main ===
- Hwang In-youp as Woo Soo-bin

A film director who returns to Korea after a big debut at international film festivals.

- Lee Hye-ri as Joo Yi-jae

A reporter struggling to make a living who has forgotten her dream.

- Baek Sung-chul as Shim Yoo-geon, who aspires to be an actor, but still gets nervous in front of the camera.
- Lee Yul-eum as Oh Ha-na, a rising actress.

=== Supporting ===
- Lee Sang-yeob as Seo In-wook

CEO of a film production company.

- Park Ji-young as Ahn Soo-hee, Ha-na's and Soo-bin's mother.
- Joo Bo-bi

== Production ==
=== Development ===
The series is directed by Yoo Sun-dong, who helmed Unmasked (2025), and written by Jung Eun-bi, who previously served as an assistant writer on Guardian: The Lonely and Great God (2016–2017) and Mr. Sunshine (2018). It is planned by KT Studio Genie and produced by Contents Planner, a subsidiary of Studio SuperPick.

=== Casting ===
In January 2025, JTBC reported that Hwang In-youp was set to take on the lead male role in the series. Originally, Lee Yoo-mi was reportedly cast as the female lead Joo Yi-jae in June 2025, but Lee Hye-ri was being considered for the role the following month. Hwang In-youp and Lee Hye-ri's appearances as the series' leads was confirmed by September 2025.

== Release ==
Dream to You was reportedly scheduled to premiere on ENA in 2026, and will also be subsequently streaming on Genie TV. By June 2026, the series was confirmed to premiere on July 13, 2026, airing every Monday and Tuesday at 22:00 (KST).

== Viewership ==
Dream to You : South Korea viewers per episode (thousands)

| Season | Episode number | | | | | | | | | | | | Average |
| Season | 1 | 2 | 3 | 4 | 5 | 6 | 7 | 8 | 9 | 10 | 11 | 12 | Average |
|---|---|---|---|---|---|---|---|---|---|---|---|---|---|
| 1 | 611 | 671 | 635 | 607 | 456 | 501 | 442 | 552 | 544 | 535 | 479 | 486 | 543 |

Source: Audience measurement performed nationwide by Nielsen Korea.

Average TV viewership ratings
| Ep. | Original broadcast date | Average audience share (Nielsen Korea) | |
| Ep. | Original broadcast date | Nationwide | Seoul |
|---|---|---|---|
| 1 | July 13, 2026 | 2.719% (2nd) | 2.468% (2nd) |
| 2 | July 14, 2026 | 2.835% (2nd) | 2.832% (2nd) |
| 3 | July 20, 2026 | 2.874% (2nd) | 3.237% (2nd) |
| 4 | July 21, 2026 | 2.698% (2nd) | 2.158% (2nd) |
| 5 | July 27, 2026 | 2.061% (3rd) | 1.872% (3rd) |
| 6 | July 28, 2026 | 2.255% (2nd) | 1.783% (2nd) |
| 7 | August 3, 2026 | 2.042% (2nd) | 2.014% (3rd) |
| 8 | August 4, 2026 | 2.492% (2nd) | 2.112% (2nd) |
| 9 | August 10, 2026 | 2.327% (2nd) | 2.188% (3rd) |
| 10 | August 11, 2026 | 2.453% (3rd) | 1.942% (3rd) |
| 11 | August 17, 2026 | 2.128% (3rd) | 1.914% (3rd) |
| 12 | August 18, 2026 | 2.302% (3rd) | 1.851% (3rd) |
| Average | | 2.432% | 2.198% |
In the table above, the blue numbers represent the lowest ratings and the red numbers represent the highest ratings.; This drama aired on a cable channel/pay TV which normally has a relatively smaller audience compared to free-to-air TV/public broadcasters (KBS, SBS, MBC, and EBS).
