= Park Ji-ah =

Park Ji-ah or Park Ji-a may refer to:

- Park Ji-ah (actress, born 1977) - South Korean actress
- Park Ji-ah (actress, born 1972) (1972-2024) - South Korean actress
