= Coffee Mate (film) =

- Theatrical poster
- Hangul: 커피메이트
- RR: Keopi meiteu
- MR: K'ŏp'i meit'ŭ
- Directed by: Yi Hyun-ha
- Written by: Yi Hyun-ha
- Produced by: Kang Sung-wook; Ryu Hee-jung
- Starring: Yoon Jin-seo; Oh Ji-ho
- Cinematography: Kim Hak-bae
- Production company: Sunny Entertainment Co. Ltd
- Distributed by: Storm Pictures
- Release dates: October 7, 2016 (Busan); March 1, 2017
- Running time: 111 minutes
- Country: South Korea
- Language: Korean
- Box office: US$46,403

Coffee Mate (Korean: 커피메이트) is a 2016 South Korean melodrama film written and directed by Yi Hyun-ha, starring Yoon Jin-seo and Oh Ji-ho.

== Plot ==
In-young is a housewife whose conventional life consists of spending time in a café. At the café, she meets Hee-soo, a carpenter, who suggests In-young that they become "coffee mates" - friends who only meet at the café and no contact via phone calls and message texts. As the meetings become more frequent, In-young and Hee-soo begin sharing their daily routines and personal secrets. Soon they find themselves developing feelings for each other.

== Cast ==
- Yoon Jin-seo as In-young
- Oh Ji-ho as Hee-soo
- Kim Min-seo as Yoon-jo
- Lee Seon-ho as Won-yeong
- Kim Jin-yeop as Young Hee-soo
- Ha Si-yeon as Young In-young
- Kim Ji-sung as Young Yoon-jae
- Nam Dong-ha as Yoon-jo's father
- Yoo Pil-ran as Yoon-jo's mother

== Release ==
The film premiered on October 7, 2016, at the 21st Busan International Film Festival, and went on general release in South Korea on March 1, 2017.
