= Shin Do-hyun =

South Korean actress (born 1995)

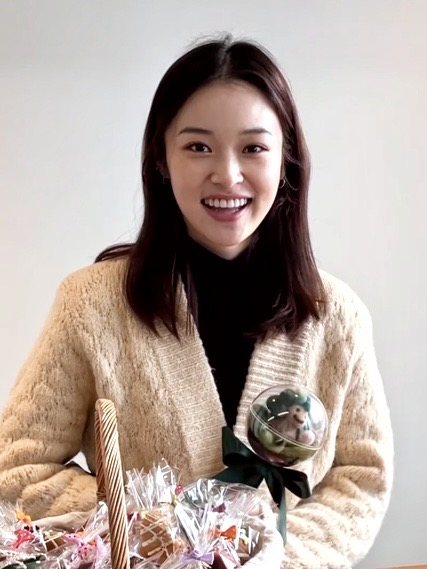
- Shin in January 2022
- Born: November 5, 1995 (age 29); Yeongju, South Korea
- Education: Sungshin Women's University – Media Video Acting
- Occupation: Actress
- Years active: 2017–present
- Agent: Vast Entertainment

Korean name
- Hangul: 신도현
- RR: Sin Dohyeon
- MR: Sin Tohyŏn

Shin Do-hyun (Korean: 신도현; born November 5, 1995) is a South Korean actress. She is best known for her roles in television series such as First Kiss (2018), Just Dance (2018), The Banker (2019), Love with Flaws (2019–2020), Hospital Playlist (2020), Doom at Your Service (2021), and the second season of The Recruit (2025).

== Early life ==
Shin was born in Yeongju, South Korea on November 5, 1995. She graduated from Sungshin Women's University in Media Video Acting.

== Filmography ==
=== Television series ===
Year	Title	Role	Notes	Ref.
2018	First Kiss (시작은 키스)	Kyung Su-bin		
2018	Switch: Change the World	So Eun-ji	Supporting cast	
2018	The Third Charm	Kim So-hee	2 episodes	
2018	Just Dance	Lee Ye-ji	Supporting cast	
2019	The Banker	Jang Mi-ho	Supporting cast	
2019	Socialization: Understanding of Dance (사교 – 땐스의 이해)	Han Soo-ji	KBS Drama Special	
2019–2020	Love with Flaws	Baek Jang-mi	Recurring role	
2020	Hospital Playlist	Bae Joon-hee	Recurring role (Season 1)	
2020	Memorials	Jang Han-bi	Supporting cast	
2021	Doom at Your Service	Na Ji-na	Main cast	
2024	Brewing Love	Bang A-reum	Main cast	
2025	The Recruit	Lee Yoo Jin	Recurring role (Season 2)	

=== Web series ===
Year	Title	Role	Notes	Ref.
2018	Just One Bite – Pilot (한입만)	Jeon Hee-sook		
2020	Half-Fifty (반오십)	Lee Jae-eun		
2023	Adult Kids (어른애들)	Cheon Sae-na		

== Theater ==
Year	Title	Role	Ref.
2022–2023	The Seagull (갈매기)	Masha	

== Awards and nominations ==
Name of the award ceremony, year presented, category, nominee of the award, and the result of the nomination
Award ceremony	Year	Category	Nominee / Work	Result	Ref.
KBS Drama Awards	2019	Best Actress in a One-Act/Special/Short Drama	Socialization: Understanding of Dance	Nominated	
KBS Drama Awards	2019	Netizen Award, Actress	Socialization: Understanding of Dance	Nominated	
MBC Drama Awards	2019	Best Supporting Cast in a Wednesday-Thursday Miniseries	The Banker, Love with Flaws	Nominated	
