= Once Upon a Small Town =

2022 South Korean web series

- Promotional poster
- Hangul: 어쩌다 전원일기
- Lit.: Accidental Country Diary
- RR: Eojjeoda jeonwonilgi
- MR: Ŏtchŏda chŏnwŏnilgi
- Genre: Romantic comedy
- Based on: Accidental Country Diary by Park Ha-min
- Developed by: Kakao Entertainment
- Written by: Baek Eun-kyeong
- Directed by: Kwon Seok-jang
- Starring: Park Soo-young; Choo Young-woo; Baek Sung-chul; Jung Suk-yong
- Music by: Moon Seong-nam
- Country of origin: South Korea
- Original language: Korean
- No. of episodes: 12

Production
- Executive producer: Kim Min-ji
- Producers: Choi Se-jeong; Choi Kyung-sook
- Running time: 32–40 minutes
- Production company: Kakao Entertainment

Original release
- Network: KakaoTV
- Release: September 5 – September 28, 2022

Once Upon a Small Town (Korean: 어쩌다 전원일기) is a 2022 South Korean streaming television series directed by Kwon Seok-jang and starring Park Soo-young, Choo Young-woo, Jung Suk-yong and Baek Sung-chul. Adapted from a web novel by Park Ha-min, this KakaoTV original series is a romantic comedy depicting Seoul veterinarian Han Ji-yul unexpectedly being thrown into a rural village and meeting local police officer Ahn Ja-young. The first episode was released on September 5, 2022 on KakaoTV, and a new episode followed every Monday, Tuesday and Wednesday at 19:00 (KST) for four weeks. The series is also available for streaming worldwide on Netflix.

== Synopsis ==
Han Ji-yul, a veterinarian from Seoul, reluctantly relocates to Huidong village to take care of his grandfather's clinic. Here he meets Ahn Ja-young, a policewoman and town insider with a friendly secret, and local cafe owner Lee Sang-hyeon. Ji-yul's transition from cushy capital city life to village living is not as seamless as he hopes, testing his ability to adapt to the unique dynamics of small-town life.

== Cast ==
=== Main ===
- Park Soo-young as Ahn Ja-young, a local 3rd-year police officer and town insider.
- Choo Young-woo as Han Ji-yul, a veterinarian, who comes from Seoul to take over the village veterinary hospital run by his grandfather.
- Baek Sung-chul as Lee Sang-hyeon, a young farmer, who runs a peach farm in Heedong village.

=== Supporting ===
==== People around Han Ji-yul ====
- Na Chul as Choi Yun-hyeong, a veterinarian who runs an animal hospital in Seoul.
- Park Ye-ni as Young-Sook, a veterinary nurse.
- Ha Yul-ri as Choi Min, ex-girlfriend of Han Ji-yul, who is a laboratory animal veterinarian at a foreign pharmaceutical company.
- Lee Dong-chan as grandfather Deok-jin, a veterinarian.

==== People in Heedong village ====
- Jung Suk-yong as Hwang Man-seong.
- Baek Ji-won as Choi Se-ryun.
- Park Ji-ah as Cha Yeon-hong, general secretary of the women's association in Heedong village.
- Yoo Yeon as Kyeong-ok, Mysterious woman with fierce eyes
- Roh Jae-won as Yoon Geun-mo, a police officer in Heedong village.
- Kim Young-sun as Mal-geum, the chairman of Majeong-ri, the village next to Heedong-ri, is patriotic for the initiative to tackle village affairs.
- Jung Si-yul as Kim Seon-dong

== Production ==
The series is directed by respected PD Kwon Seok-jang. Initially Choi Soo-young and Jang Keun-suk were offered lead roles in the series in August 2021. Later in September 2021, it was reported that it didn't work. In May 2022, Choo Young-woo as Han Ji-yul, the native Seoul veterinarian, and Park Soo-young as Ahn Ja-young, the local police officer were confirmed as the male and female leads in the series. Baek Seong-cheol joined the cast later in May as Lee Sang-hyeon, a handsome young farmer.

Since the series was shot in rural environment involving animals, the production team created a safe environment, with the advice of veterinarians, from the script writing process till the actual filming. The entire filming, where animals were present, was done in the presence of a veterinarian and a professional trainer. The production team revealed, "All props that come into contact with animals were specially made of silicone to ensure safety, and anything that could be harmful was excluded as much as possible."

== Reception ==
Once Upon a Small Town reached the Netflix Global Top 10 list of the most-watched TV (Non-English) and entered the Netflix Top 10 in 33 countries. The series also reached the Top 10 of the OTT Integrated Ranking, which includes all platforms. "The drama has been well received and is expected to rise in the future along with the effect of the global OTT platform."

The series received positive reviews from critics and viewers for its acting, screenplay, and directing. Time magazine praised Once Upon a Small Town and selected it as one of the 10 best Korean dramas of 2022 to watch on Netflix. Rolling Stone India chose Once Upon a Small Town as one of the Top 10 best Korean romantic comedies of 2022.

== Original soundtrack ==
Once Upon a Small Town

Soundtrack album by Various
- Released: 2022
- Genre: Soundtrack
- Languages: Korean; English
- Labels: Dreamus; Most content

=== Part 1 ===
Released on September 6, 2022
No.	Title	Lyrics	Music	Artist	Length
1.	"Missing You"	Moon Seong-nam	Moon Seong-nam	Hong Dae-kwang	3:55
2.	"Missing You" (inst.)				3:55

=== Part 2 ===
Released on September 13, 2022
No.	Title	Lyrics	Music	Artist	Length
1.	"Sunset Village"	Seongnam Moon (Every Single Day)	Seongnam Moon (Every Single Day)	O.WHEN	4:30
2.	"Sunset Village" (inst.)				4:30

== Episodes ==
No.	Title	Directed by	Written by	Original release date
1	"Episode 1"	Kwon Seok-jang	Baek Eun-kyeong	September 5, 2022
Veterinarian Han Ji-yul, a Seoul based Vetinarian, is tricked by his grandfather into coming to the village to take care of his hospital and house while he goes on a cruise. Here he meets Ahn Ja-young, a police woman, who is a town insider. Ja-young takes him on his assignments as veterinarian. He treats a dog and then an angry goat who has split his head open. Back at his Grandpa's, the women's association barges in at night with food as a surprise, much to his annoyance. When everyone leaves, he reads the letter which his grandfather has left him. In the backdrop of him touring the house, we hear the heartwarming letter. Ji-yul goes to the vet clinic and thinks of all that his grandparents have done for everyone and for him. As he comes outside, he finds Ja-young swimming alone, wearing all of her clothes and a headlight.
2	"Episode 2"	Kwon Seok-jang	Baek Eun-kyeong	September 6, 2022
At the beginning of episode we find Ja-young looking at her old book and remembering when Ji-yul had told her that they would be secret friends. Ji-yul starts his day with a run. On the way villagers flock around him, ruining his concentration and testing his patience. At the clinic, Ji-yul finds that he has to perform vaccinations on large number of pigs that day. Ja-young accompanies him and with her assistance they do it. In cafe he meets Lee Sang-hyeon, the owner of the cafe and the peach farm. His next appointment was to take care of a baby goat with colic. There are incidences of small thefts in the village and, Ja-young on look out of thief gets a call from Seon-dong, who saw the burglar inside Ji-yul's house. After some struggle they catch the guy.
3	"Episode 3"	Kwon Seok-jang	Baek Eun-kyeong	September 7, 2022
It turns out that the thief is from rival village of Majeong, so a fight breaks out between the representatives of the two villages defending and accusing one another. When Ja-young offers to give him a ride home and help clean up the mess, Ji-yul asks her to leave him alone. Ji-yul finishes cleaning his home and feels slightly intoxicated from cleaning the sticky booze from the floor. The next morning Ji-yul attempts to talk to Ja-young, but she rides off. On his next house call to Majeong village, Ji-yul finds the Majeong representative asking Ja-young about her mother. Later, when Ji-yul asks Sang-hyeon to sell one of his truck the bargaining is hilarious as they try to one-up each other. Ja-young later tells Sang-hyeon that Ji-yul is the one who was her secret friend from that summer when they were 12. On her way home, Ja-young thinks about the question Ji-yul had asked her – "And who do you have to rely on?".
4	"Episode 4"	Kwon Seok-jang	Baek Eun-kyeong	September 12, 2022
5	"Episode 5"	Kwon Seok-jang	Baek Eun-kyeong	September 13, 2022
6	"Episode 6"	Kwon Seok-jang	Baek Eun-kyeong	September 14, 2022
7	"Episode 7"	Kwon Seok-jang	Baek Eun-kyeong	September 19, 2022
8	"Episode 8"	Kwon Seok-jang	Baek Eun-kyeong	September 20, 2022
9	"Episode 9"	Kwon Seok-jang	Baek Eun-kyeong	September 21, 2022
10	"Episode 10"	Kwon Seok-jang	Baek Eun-kyeong	September 26, 2022
11	"Episode 11"	Kwon Seok-jang	Baek Eun-kyeong	September 27, 2022
12	"Episode 12"	Kwon Seok-jang	Baek Eun-kyeong	September 28, 2022
