= How to Be Thirty =

2021 South Korean streaming television series

- Promotional poster
- Korean: 아직 낫서른
- Genre: Romantic comedy
- Based on: Something About 30 by Hye-won
- Directed by: Oh Ki-hwan
- Starring: Jung In-sun; Kang Min-hyuk; Ahn Hee-yeon; Song Jae-rim; Cha Min-ji; Baek Sung-chul; Kim Ji-sung
- Music by: Lee Ji-soo
- Country of origin: South Korea
- Original language: Korean
- No. of episodes: 15

Production
- Producers: Yoo Jung-hoon; Shin Jong-soo
- Running time: 18–20 minutes
- Production company: Merry Christmas

Original release
- Network: KakaoTV
- Release: February 23 – April 13, 2021

How to Be Thirty (Korean: 아직 낫서른; RR: Ajik Natseoreun; lit. 'Not Yet Thirty') is a South Korean web series starring Jung In-sun, Kang Min-hyuk, Ahn Hee-yeon, Song Jae-rim, Cha Min-ji, Baek Sung-chul, and Kim Ji-sung. Based on the webtoon Something About 30 by Hye-won, it premiered on KakaoTV on February 23, 2021, with a new episode being released every Tuesday and Saturday at 17:00 (KST). The series has surpassed 13 million cumulative views as of just two weeks of airing.

== Synopsis ==
How to Be Thirty tells the story of a group of friends in their early thirties.

== Cast ==
=== Main ===
- Jung In-sun as Seo Ji-won
  - Kwon Jung-eun as young Seo Ji-won

A 30-year-old webtoon artist who achieved success. Ran-joo and Ah-young are her best friends.

- Kang Min-hyuk as Lee Seung-yoo
  - Kwon Yong-wook as young Lee Seung-yoo

A manager who is put in charge of editing Ji-won's webtoon. Seo Ji-won's first love

- Ahn Hee-yeon as Lee Ran-joo

A 30-year-old news presenter. Ji-won and Ah-young are her best friends.

- Song Jae-rim as Cha Do-hoon

A film director who will direct a film based on one of Ji-won's webtoon.

- Cha Min-ji as Hong Ah-young

A 30-year-old café owner. Ji-won and Ran-joo are her best friends.

- Baek Sung-chul as Hyung Joon-young

A part-time employee at Ah-young's café.

- Kim Ji-sung as Lee Hye-ryung

Seung-yoo's girlfriend

=== Supporting ===
- Lee Chae-won as Yoon Sun-mi

Ji-won's assistant

- Kim Min as Ms. Jung

Ran-joo's co-worker

- Lee Kang-min as Kim Byung-ho

Ah-young's ex-boyfriend

- Shim Tae-young as Kim Jin-woo

Ji-won's ex-boyfriend

=== Special appearances ===
- Kim Hyun-suk as man interested in Ran-joo #1 (Ep. 1)
- Go Deok-won as man interested in Ran-joo #2 (Ep. 1)
- Yoon Deok-ki as man interested in Ran-joo #3 (Ep. 1)
- Lee Min-sung as man interested in Ran-joo #4 (Ep. 1)
- Choi Myung-ji as man interested in Ran-joo #5 (Ep. 1)
- Lee Dong-won (Ep. 4)
- Kwon Dong-ho as director (Ep. 3, 6, 12-13)
- Hong Yi-hyun as Seung-yoo's co-worker #1 (Ep. 1-2, 12-13)
- Choi Ji-won as Seung-yoo's co-worker #2 (Ep. 1, 3)
- Song Gyo-hyun as Seung-yoo's co-worker #3 (Ep. 1, 3, 12)
- Lee Jeong-hoon as Seung-yoo's co-worker #4 (Ep. 1, 3, 12)
- Oh Tae-gon as Ran-joo co-worker #1 (Ep. 2, 6-7, 10, 13)
- Oh Ji-yeong as Ran-joo co-worker #2 (Ep. 2, 6-7, 10, 13)
- No Jong-sung (Ep. 3)
- Jo Hye-won as announcer (Ep. 6)
- Park Jeong-min (Ep. 6)
- Yu Yeon-seok (Ep. 6)
- Bae Ha-neul as Ran-joo's date (Ep. 7)
- Seo Ji-mi as Ran-joo's personal trainer (Ep. 4, 9)
- Kim Mi-na as Hye-ryeong's friend (Ep. 9, 12)

== Episodes ==
No.	Title	Directed by	Written by	Original release date
1	"Not Yet Thirty"; Transliteration: "Ajik Natseoreun" (Korean: 아직 낯설은)	Oh Ki-hwan	Jung Yi-jin	February 23, 2021
Seo Ji-won is a 30-year-old webtoon artist who learns that her new manager has the same name as her first love whom she hasn't seen in fifteen years. She reminisces about the past. Her best friends Lee Ran-joo and Hong Ah-young have also been struggling with their own love stories; the three friends decide to make resolutions. Ji-won meets her new manager who turns out to be the Lee Seung-yoo she knew when she was a teenager.
2	"Moderately Smart, Moderately Sophisticated"; Transliteration: "Jeokdanghi Ttokttokaejigo Jeokdanghi Gyomyohaejin" (Korean: 적당히 똑똑해지고 적당히 교묘해진)	Oh Ki-hwan	Jung Yi-jin	February 27, 2021
3	"The Best Way to Draw the Line"; Transliteration: "Seoneul Geunneun Choeseonui Bangbeop" (Korean: 선을 긋는 최선의 방법)	Oh Ki-hwan	Jung Yi-jin	March 2, 2021
4	"Like a Watercolor"; Transliteration: "Suchaehwacheoreom" (Korean: 수채화처럼)	Oh Ki-hwan	Jung Yi-jin	March 6, 2021
5	"When the Doors Open"; Transliteration: "Muni Yeollimyeon" (Korean: 문이 열리면)	Oh Ki-hwan	Jung Yi-jin	March 9, 2021
6	"I'll close my eyes"	Oh Ki-hwan	Jung Yi-jin	March 13, 2021
7	"Brilliantly Shattered"; Transliteration: "Challanhage Buseojin" (Korean: 찬란하게 부서진)	Oh Ki-hwan	Jung Yi-jin	March 16, 2021
8	"Part Truth, Part Lie"; Transliteration: "Jinsirui Jogak Geojisui Papyeon" (Korean: 진실의 조각 거짓의 파편)	Oh Ki-hwan	Jung Yi-jin	March 20, 2021
9	"An Underdog Relationship"; Transliteration: "Eurui Yeonae" (Korean: 을의 연애)	Oh Ki-hwan	Jung Yi-jin	March 23, 2021
10	"The Adults' Delusion"; Transliteration: "Eoreunideurui Chakgak" (Korean: 어른이들의 착각)	Oh Ki-hwan	Jung Yi-jin	March 27, 2021
11	"The Beginning of a Breakdown"; Transliteration: "Gyunyeorui Sijak" (Korean: 균열의 시작)	Oh Ki-hwan	Jung Yi-jin	March 30, 2021
12	"Top Dog Relationship"; Transliteration: "Gabui Yeonae" (Korean: 갑의 연애)	Oh Ki-hwan	Jung Yi-jin	April 3, 2021
13	"The Best Relationship"; Transliteration: "Choeseonui Yeonae" (Korean: 최선의 연애)	Oh Ki-hwan	Jung Yi-jin	April 6, 2021
14	"The Collapse"; Transliteration: "Paguk" (Korean: 파국)	Oh Ki-hwan	Jung Yi-jin	April 10, 2021
15	"Not Yet Thirty"; Transliteration: "Ajik Natseoreun" (Korean: 아직 낫서른)	Oh Ki-hwan	Jung Yi-jin	April 13, 2021

== Production ==
=== Development ===
In late August 2019, it was announced that the KakaoPage webtoon Born in 1985 by Hye-won would be adapted into a web series.

=== Casting ===
On August 11, 2020, Jung In-sun, Kang Min-hyuk, Ahn Hee-yeon and Song Jae-rim were confirmed to star in the series. Baek Sung-chul officially joined the cast on November 6, followed by Cha Min-ji on November 13.

=== Filming ===
Filming began in August 2020.

== International broadcast ==
The series, titled as How to be Thirty, is available with multilingual subtitles on iQIYI (iQ.com) in South East Asia, Hong Kong, Macau and Taiwan.

It is available in the UK and Europe with community-generated subtitles on Viki (Viki.com)
