= Link: Eat, Love, Kill =

2022 South Korean television series

- Promotional poster
- Hangul: 링크: 먹고 사랑하라, 죽이게
- Lit.: Link: Eat and Love, So I Can Kill
- RR: Ringkeu: meokgo saranghara, jugige
- MR: Ringk'ŭ: mŏkko saranghara, chugige
- Genre: Fantasy; Melodrama; Romance
- Created by: Studio Dragon
- Written by: Kwon Yi-young; Kwon Do-hwan
- Directed by: Hong Jong-chan
- Starring: Yeo Jin-goo; Moon Ka-young
- Music by: Nam Hye-seung
- Country of origin: South Korea
- Original language: Korean
- No. of episodes: 16

Production
- Running time: 72 minutes
- Production companies: Studio Dragon; C-JeS Entertainment; Arc Media

Original release
- Network: tvN
- Release: June 6 – July 26, 2022

Link: Eat, Love, Kill (Korean: 링크: 먹고 사랑하라, 죽이게) is a 2022 South Korean television series starring Yeo Jin-goo and Moon Ka-young. It aired on TVN from June 6 to July 26, 2022, every Monday and Tuesday at 22:30 (KST) for 16 episodes. It is also available for streaming on Disney+ in selected regions.

== Synopsis ==
Eun Gye-hoon (Yeo Jin-goo) and his twin sister can feel each other's feelings even if they are far apart; the siblings call this phenomenon 'link'. Gye-hoon, who has never felt a link since his sister's disappearance 18 years ago, suddenly starts to share a woman's (Moon Ka-young) feelings and experiences, all of her joy, sorrow, and pain.

== Cast ==
=== Main ===
- Yeo Jin-goo as Eun Gye-hoon

A sous chef at a high-end restaurant. He comes to Jihwa-dong, his childhood neighborhood, to open a restaurant.

- Moon Ga-young as Noh Da-hyun

A job seeker who works as a trainee at Jihwayang restaurant.

=== Supporting ===
==== People around Eun Gye-hoon ====
- Park Bo-kyung as Jang Mi-sook

Eun Gye-hoon's mother.

- Kwon Hyuk as Eun Cheol-ho

Eun Gye-hoon's father.

- Ahn Se-bin as Eun Gye-young

Eun Gye-hoon's fraternal twin sister who went missing at the age of 10.

- Woo Mi-hwa as Jang Mi-seon

Eun Gye-hoon's aunt.

==== People around Noh Da-hyun ====
- Kim Ji-young as Hong Bok-hee

Noh Da-hyun's mother and owner of Chun-ok Hot Pot Restaurant.

- Ye Soo-jung as Na Chun-ok

Noh Da-hyun's paternal grandmother.

==== People at Jihwa Police Substation ====
- Song Duk-ho as Ji Won-tak/Han Sejin

A police officer and Hwang Min-jo's ex-boyfriend.

- Lee Bom-so-ri as Hwang Min-jo

A sergeant rank police officer and Ji Won-tak's ex-girlfriend.

- Kim Chan-hyung as Ahn Jung-ho

An Inspector at Jihwa Police Substation.

- Yoo Sung-joo as Seo Young-hwan

Chief at Jihwa Police Substation.

- Yoo Dong-hoon as Bong Soon-kyung

A police officer at Jihwa Police Substation.

==== People at Jihwayang Restaurant ====
- Lee Suk-hyeong as Cha Jin-ho

A junior chef of Eun Gye-hoon.

- Lee Bom as Lee Eun-jeong

Lee Da-jung's older sister who starts working at Jihwayang.

==== Jihwa-dong residents ====
- Yoo Jung-ho as Kim Min-cheol

Park Seon-hwa's husband who works as a taxi driver.

- Park Ji-ah as Park Seon-hwa

Kim Min-cheol's wife.

- Yoon Sang-hwa as Jo Dong-nam

Yang Dong-sook's husband who works as a construction worker.

- Kim Kwak-kyung-hee as Yang Dong-sook

Jo Dong-nam's wife.

- Jung Yeon-shim as Kang Mi-jin

A friend of Hong Bok-hee who owns Mijin's Estate.

- Kim Hyun as Jo Jae-suk

Go Chang-soo's wife who works as an aerobics instructor.

- Choi Jae-seop as Go Chang-soo

Jo Jae-suk's husband who runs an adult game room in Jihwa-dong.

- Lee Gyu-ho as Han Eui-chan

A man who wanders around the neighbourhood. 18 years ago, he was Eun Gye-young's piano teacher who became a suspect in her disappearance.

==== Others ====
- Shin Jae-hwi as Lee Jin-geun

A stalker of Noh Da-hyun.

=== Special appearance ===
- Kim Won-hae as Antonio (Ep. 1)

== Production ==
=== Casting ===
The series reunited Yeo Jin-goo and Moon Ga-young after the 2010 KBS historical drama The Reputable Family, in which they played the childhood counterparts of the protagonists.

=== Filming ===
On March 22, 2022, it was announced that filming had been temporarily suspended after Yeo Jin-goo underwent a PCR test for COVID-19. The next day, it was announced that his test result was positive, and he would be absent from filming. It was also announced that filming would resume for other scenes that don't have Yeo's involvement.

== Original soundtrack ==
=== Part 1 ===
Released on June 14, 2022
No.	Title	Lyrics	Music	Artist	Length
1.	"Your River in Me" (내 마음속 너의 강)	Nam Hye-seung; Kim Kyung-hee	Nam Hye-seung; Kim Kyung-hee	O3ohn	4:48
2.	"Your River in Me" (내 마음속 너의 강; Inst.)		Nam Hye-seung; Kim Kyung-hee		4:48
Total length:					9:36

=== Part 2 ===
Released on June 21, 2022
No.	Title	Lyrics	Music	Artist	Length
1.	"Saying Hello" (너의 하루를 묻고 싶어)	Nam Hye-seung; Kim Kyung-hee	Nam Hye-seung; Park Sang-hee	Minnie ((G)I-dle)	3:59
2.	"Saying Hello" (너의 하루를 묻고 싶어; Inst.)		Nam Hye-seung; Park Sang-he		3:59
Total length:					7:58

=== Part 3 ===
Released on June 27, 2022
No.	Title	Lyrics	Music	Artist	Length
1.	"Swing" (그네)	Nam Hye-seung; Janet Suhh	B.a.B	Kimmuseum	3:44
2.	"Swing" (그네; Inst.)		B.a.B		3:44
Total length:					7:28

=== Part 4 ===
Released on June 28, 2022
No.	Title	Lyrics	Music	Artist	Length
1.	"Pit a Pat"	Nam Hye-seung; Park Jin-ho	Nam Hye-seung; Park Jin-ho	Seungkwan (Seventeen)	3:32
2.	"Pit a Pat" (Inst.)		Nam Hye-seung; Park Jin-ho		3:32
Total length:					7:04

=== Part 5 ===
Released on July 5, 2022
No.	Title	Lyrics	Music	Artist	Length
1.	"Unknown World"	Nam Hye-seung; Janet Suhh	Nam Hye-seung; Park Sang-hee	Janet Suhh	2:08
2.	"You l've Missed"	Nam Hye-seung; Janet Suhh	Nam Hye-seung; Park Sang-hee	Janet Suhh	3:43
3.	"Unknown World" (Inst.)		Nam Hye-seung; Park Sang-hee		2:08
4.	"You l've Missed" (Inst.)		Nam Hye-seung; Park Sang-hee		3:43
Total length:					11:42

=== Part 6 ===
Released on July 12, 2022
No.	Title	Lyrics	Music	Artist	Length
1.	"Link" (링크)	Kim Min-seok	Nam Hye-seung; Park Jin-ho	MeloMance	3:39
2.	"Link" (링크; Inst.)		Nam Hye-seung; Park Jin-ho		3:39
Total length:					7:18

=== Part 7 ===
Released on July 19, 2022
No.	Title	Lyrics	Music	Artist	Length
1.	"Step By Step"	Nam Hye-seung; Janet Suhh	Nam Hye-seung; Park Sang-hee	Rothy	4:27
2.	"Step By Step" (Inst.)		Nam Hye-seung; Park Sang-hee		4:27
Total length:					8:54

== Viewership ==
Link: Eat, Love, Kill : South Korea viewers per episode (thousands)

Season	Episode number																Average
Season	1	2	3	4	5	6	7	8	9	10	11	12	13	14	15	16	Average
1	767	655	525	528	493	532	345	479	398	478	364	448	306	384	331	521	472

Source: Audience measurement performed nationwide by Nielsen Korea.

Average TV viewership ratings
Ep.	Original broadcast date	Average audience share (Nielsen Korea)	
Ep.	Original broadcast date	Nationwide	Seoul
1	June 6, 2022	3.124% (1st)	3.280% (1st)
2	June 6, 2022	3.098% (2nd)	3.342% (2nd)
3	June 13, 2022	2.280% (2nd)	1.947% (2nd)
4	June 14, 2022	2.562% (2nd)	2.659% (2nd)
5	June 20, 2022	1.933% (2nd)	2.032% (2nd)
6	June 21, 2022	2.533% (2nd)	2.398% (2nd)
7	June 27, 2022	1.469% (5th)	1.192% (6th)
8	June 28, 2022	2.133% (2nd)	1.847% (2nd)
9	July 4, 2022	1.748% (2nd)	1.465% (2nd)
10	July 5, 2022	2.234% (2nd)	1.944% (2nd)
11	July 11, 2022	1.467% (4th)	N/A
12	July 12, 2022	1.873% (2nd)	1.728% (2nd)
13	July 18, 2022	1.423% (5th)	1.167% (7th)
14	July 19, 2022	2.021% (2nd)	1.708% (3rd)
15	July 25, 2022	1.610% (2nd)	1.162% (5th)
16	July 26, 2022	2.228% (2nd)	1.881% (2nd)
Average		2.108%	— (Note: Due to some ratings not recorded, the exact average rating is unknown.)
In the table above, the blue numbers represent the lowest published ratings and the red numbers represent the highest published ratings.; N/A denotes ratings that were not released.; This drama airs on a cable channel/pay TV which normally has a relatively smaller audience compared to free-to-air TV/public broadcasters (KBS, SBS, MBC, and EBS).
