= The Banker (TV series) =

2019 South Korean television series

- Promotional poster
- Hangul: 더 뱅커
- RR: Deo baengkeo
- MR: Tŏ paengk'ŏ
- Genre: Drama
- Based on: Kansayaku Nozaki Shuhei by Ryōka Shū and Shigeru Noda
- Developed by: Park Jae-beom
- Written by: Seo Eun-jung; Oh Hye-ran
- Directed by: Lee Jae-jin
- Starring: Kim Sang-joong; Chae Shi-ra; Yoo Dong-geun; Kim Tae-woo
- Music by: Lee Ji-yong
- Country of origin: South Korea
- Original language: Korean
- No. of episodes: 32 (Note: In order to circumvent Korean laws that prevent commercial breaks in the middle of an episode, what would previously have been aired as single 70 minute episodes are now being repackaged as two 35 minute episodes, with two episodes being shown each night with a commercial break between the two.)

Production
- Executive producer: Kim Dong-rae
- Camera setup: Single-camera
- Running time: 35 minutes
- Production companies: MBC Drama Production; RaemongRaein Co., Ltd.

Original release
- Network: MBC TV
- Release: March 27 – May 16, 2019

Related
- Nozaki Shuhei Auditor of Bank (WOWOW, 2018)

The Banker (Korean: 더 뱅커) is a 2019 South Korean television series starring Kim Sang-joong, Chae Shi-ra, Yoo Dong-geun and Kim Tae-woo. It is based on the Japanese manga Kansayaku Nozaki Shuhei which was written by Ryōka Shū and illustrated by Shigeru Noda from 1998 to 2002. The series aired on MBC's Wednesdays and Thursdays at 22:00 KST from March 27 to May 16, 2019.

== Synopsis ==
No Dae-ho, an honest banker, tries to fight corruption.

== Cast ==
=== Main ===
- Kim Sang-joong as Noh Dae-ho
- Chae Shi-ra as Han Soo-ji
- Yoo Dong-geun as Kang Sam-do
- Kim Tae-woo as Lee Hae-gon

=== Supporting ===
==== Audit Office staff ====
- Ahn Woo-yeon as Seo Bo-geol
- Shin Do-hyun as Jang Mi-ho
- Cha In-ha as Moon Hong-joo
- Kim Kyu-chul as Park Yong-soo
- Kim Byung-choon as Han Min-gu
- Lee Yoon-sang as Cho Young-sik

==== Korean Bank employees ====
- Ahn Nae-sang as Yug Gwan-sik
- Seo Yi-sook as Do Jeong-ja
- Ju Seok-jae as Lim Chang-jae
- Oh Yong as Min Hyeong-gi
- Jung Kyung-ho as Byeon Seong-tae
- Jung Hyung-suk as Sung Chi-wook
- Lim Seung-dae as Kim Young-ho

==== People around Kang Sam-do ====
- Kim Young-pil as Secretary Kim
- Go In-beom as Jung Soo-chan
- Kim Byung-ki as Choi Jong-soo
- Nam Myeong-lyeol as Park Jin-ho

==== Others ====
- Park Jung-hak as Bae Dong-seok
- Lee Jin-kwon as Mr. Jeong
- Ryu Sung-hyun as Park Jung-bae
- Son Jeon-geun
- Lee Mi-young
- Oh Seung-eun
- Choi Yang-rak
- Kim Byung-chun

=== Guests ===
- Jang Gwang as Jo Jang-kwang, (Haesan Group chairman)

== Production ==
- The first script reading took place on January 30, 2019.
- The Banker reunites Kim Sang-joong and Kim Tae-woo who previously starred together in The Jingbirok: A Memoir Of Imjin War.

== Original soundtrack ==
The Banker OST

Soundtrack album
- Released: 2019
- Genre: Soundtrack
- Languages: Korean; English
- Labels: Warner Music Korea; Snow Entertainment

=== Part 1 ===
Released on March 28, 2019
No.	Title	Artist	Length
1.	"Suddenly" (괜스레)	Lee Eun-mi	4:14
2.	"Suddenly" (Inst.)		4:14
Total length:			8:28

=== Part 2 ===
Released on April 3, 2019
No.	Title	Artist	Length
1.	"Justice"	KLANG	3:21
2.	"Justice" (Inst.)		3:21
Total length:			6:42

== Ratings ==
- In this table, the blue numbers represent the lowest ratings and the red numbers represent the highest ratings.
- N/A denotes that the rating is not known.

Ep.	Original broadcast date	Average audience share		
Ep.	Original broadcast date	AGB Nielsen		TNmS
Ep.	Original broadcast date	Nationwide	Seoul	Nationwide
1	March 27, 2019	4.6%	5.2%	3.7%
2	March 27, 2019	4.5%	5.2%	4.0%
3	March 28, 2019	2.5%	—N/a	3.3%
4	March 28, 2019	3.3%	—N/a	3.5%
5	April 3, 2019	4.1%	4.5%	4.4%
6	April 3, 2019	4.9%	4.9%	5.2%
7	April 4, 2019	3.9%	4.1%	—N/a
8	April 4, 2019	4.6%	4.7%	—N/a
9	April 10, 2019	3.6%	3.7%	3.8%
10	April 10, 2019	4.5%	4.5%	4.8%
11	April 11, 2019	4.4%	4.5%	—N/a
12	April 11, 2019	5.2%	5.7%	—N/a
13	April 17, 2019	3.8%	4.3%	3.4%
14	April 17, 2019	4.1%	4.8%	3.7%
15	April 18, 2019	2.6%	—N/a	—N/a
16	April 18, 2019	3.0%	—N/a	—N/a
17	April 24, 2019	3.4%	3.5%	—N/a
18	April 24, 2019	4.0%	4.0%	—N/a
19	April 25, 2019	3.0%	—N/a	—N/a
20	April 25, 2019	3.6%	—N/a	—N/a
21	May 1, 2019	3.4%	3.7%	—N/a
22	May 1, 2019	4.2%	4.6%	—N/a
23	May 2, 2019	4.1%	4.4%	—N/a
24	May 2, 2019	4.7%	4.8%	—N/a
25	May 8, 2019	3.7%	3.8%	3.5%
26	May 8, 2019	4.6%	4.7%	3.7%
27	May 9, 2019	3.6%	—N/a	3.5%
28	May 9, 2019	4.6%	4.5%	4.4%
29	May 15, 2019	3.6%	—N/a	3.2%
30	May 15, 2019	4.3%	—N/a	4.0%
31	May 16, 2019	5.4%	5.4%	—N/a
32	May 16, 2019	7.0%	6.8%	5.1%
Average		4.1%	— (Note: Due to some ratings not recorded, the exact average rating is unknown.)	—
