= Park Ye-young =

South Korean actor (born 1989)

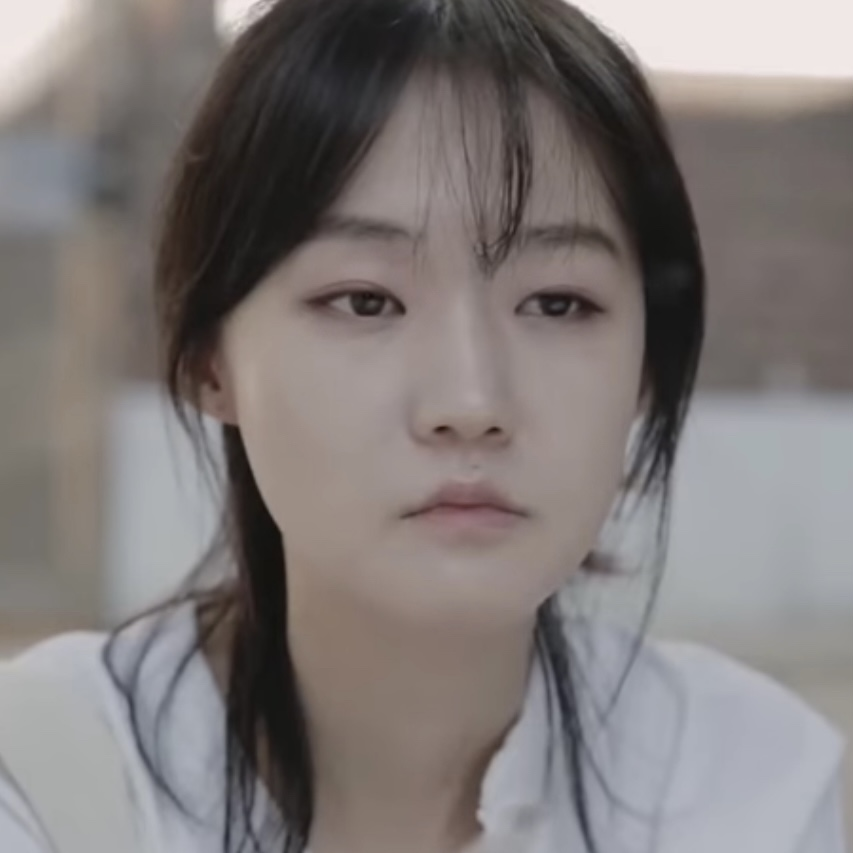
- Park in November 2017
- Born: August 22, 1989 (age 37); South Korea
- Education: Konkuk University (Film Studies)
- Occupation: Actress
- Years active: 2013–present
- Agent: C-JeS

Korean name
- Hangul: 박예영
- RR: Bak Yeyeong
- MR: Pak Yeyŏng

Park Ye-young (Korean: 박예영; born August 22, 1989) is a South Korean actress. After graduating from the Film Department of Konkuk University College of Arts and Design, Park began her acting career in 2013, and has since starred in several independent short and feature films. She is also recognized for her supporting role in Netflix original series Hometown Cha-Cha-Cha (2021), Coupang play original Anna (2022), and drama Summer Strike (2022).

== Early life and education ==
During her childhood, Park watched a theater performance that sparked a vague curiosity about acting. Her serious interest in acting developed in middle school, where, influenced by a teacher, she enrolled in a theater class. She attended for only one semester before transferring schools mid-year. In high school, Park's passion for acting resurfaced, and she persuaded her parents to support her dream. To further her aspirations, she studied in the Film Department of Konkuk University College of Arts and Design.

== Career ==
=== Debut and career in independent film ===
Park embarked on her acting career with the short film Winter Preparation (2013), portraying the titular character Jae-in. Directed by Lee Yoon-hyeong, the film premiered at the 12th Mise-en-scène Short Film Festival and was also screened at the 14th Daegu Short Film Festival, marking Park's first two film festival attendances. In the same year, Park starred in the short film Shorts, which screened at the 2013 Seoul Independent Film Festival.

In 2015, another short film featuring Park, And Autumn Has Come, was invited to the Mise-en-scène Short Film Festival and the Jeonbuk Independent Film Festival. The following year, her short film The Road Not Taken, also known as Galae (2016), screened at the Seoul International Women's Film Festival and received an invitation to the Seoul International Youth Film Festival.

Park Ye-young is an enigmatic actress. In films, Park often gazes at her co-stars from peculiar angles, at unexpected moments, and with a timing that is difficult to explain. As cinema is an art of perspectives, each time she does so, it evokes a sensation that the entire screen is tilting. It's a kind of gravitational force. That's the only way to describe it. It's because Park Ye-young alone has the ability to create such a feeling. At first, I thought it was a directorial choice, but as I observed this power consistently manifesting across films by different directors, I found it to be uncanny. I yearned to witness this power more frequently. Perhaps this actress will only grow stronger with time.

— Jeong Seong-il, director and film critic, Cine21

In 2017, Park was chosen as the featured actress for the "10th FILM DABIN Project: Actress Park Ye-young." The project showcased three of her independent films: And Autumn Has Come, My Chemical Love, and Shall We Go. Two discussion events with Park were also held, moderated by Director Hyung Seul-woo, with panel members including Directors Choi Jeong-ho and Lee Yu-ri, and Moon In-su. These events took place on Saturday, November 11, at Seoul Theater 8, 13, Jongno District, Seoul, and Saturday, November 18, at Pause Cinema, Chuncheon-si, Gangwon Province.

=== Television debut and recent projects ===
In 2019, Park made her television debut with a minor role as a nurse in Yoo Je-won's drama series Abyss. A year later, she appeared as Nurse Heo Min-young in episodes 22 and 23 of the drama series Soul Mechanic. In 2021, Park portrayed Lee Sung-sil in episode 6 of Sell Your Haunted House. That same year, she reunited with director Yoo Je-won in her first supporting role as variety show writer Wang Ji-won in the drama series Hometown Cha-Cha-Cha. In the drama, Wang Ji-won was also a love interest of Ji PD, a character played by Lee Sang-yi. Furthermore, Park made brief cameo appearances in the film Emergency Declaration and drama series Reflection of You. She then appeared in episodes 1, 2, and 4 of Inspector Koo, portraying Yoon Jae-young.

Moving on to 2022, Park starred alongside Bae Suzy in Coupang Play original series Anna, playing Anna's best friend Ji-won. Her performance garnered critical acclaim and earned her the New Actress Award for Series at the 2023 Director's Cut Awards. Additionally, in 2022, Park returned to independent film with the titular role in Jung Hae-il's Joo-young in Wonderland. The film screened at The 16th Evergreen Digilog World Film Festival, where director Jung Hae-il received the Special Award. Park was affiliated with artist management Dongyi Company from July 2022. However, in March 2023, Park signed with C-JeS Entertainment.

== Filmography ==
Key
†	Denotes films that have not yet been released

=== Feature film ===
Year	Title	Role	Ref.
2010	Shotgun Love (사랑이 무서워)	Lingerie model	
2011	The story of my life (멋진 인생)	Staff 2	
2011	Cane (회초리)	Eun-ja	
2012	New Kids in Town (뉴키즈 인 타운)	Bo-young	
2015	Girl on the Edge (여고생)	Eunyoung	
2015	Socialphobia	Ha Young-dong	
2016	Janggi King: Garak Market Revolution (장기왕: 가락시장 레볼루션)	Du-hee	
2018	The Drug King	Mulberry 4	
2019	Vertigo (버티고)	Ye-dam	
2019	Hit-and-Run Squad	Yeo-jeong	
2019	Never Ever Rush (너는 결코 서둘지 말라)	Cho-yeon	
2020	Child (아이)	Head teacher	
2020	My Room (나의 방)	Young-shin	
2021	Emergency Declaration	Tokyo Control Center Team Member	

=== Short film ===
Year	Title	Role	Notes	Ref.
2013	Preparing for Winter (월동준비)	Jae-in (Jane)	Debut	
2013	The Short Stories (단편선)	Student		
2015	And Autumn Has Come (그리고 가을이 왔다)	Jisun		
2016	Road not taken (갈래)	Na		
2017	Recording (녹음)	Su-yeon		
2017	My Chemical Love (마이 케미컬 러브)	Seon-ju		
2018	Sally's Law (샐리의 법칙)			
2018	The Hitchhiker (히치하이커)	Female worker		
2018	Capsular Coffee of Team Greetings (인사3팀의 캡슐커피)	Kim Min-ju		
2019	Leo (레오)	Eu-nae		
2019	Stolen Sunshine (나의 방)	Yeong-sin		
2019	Home (홈)	Mogul	Animated film (voice appearance)	
2019	Seire (세이레)	Wife		
2022	Joo-young in Wonderland (더더더)	Joo-young		

=== Television series ===
Television series appearances
Year	Title	Role	Note	Ref.
2019	Abyss	Nurse	TV Debut	
2020	Soul Mechanic	Heo Min-young (Nurse)		
2021	Sell Your Haunted House	Lee Sung-sil (Ghost)	Minor Role	
2021	Hometown Cha-Cha-Cha	Wang Ji-won		
2021	Reflection of You	Taerim Girls' Middle School Faculty	Cameo	
2021	Inspector Koo	Yoon Jae-young	Cameo (episodes 1, 2, & 4)	
2022	Summer Strike	Jo Ji-young		
2024	Captivating the King	Court Lady Dong		
2026	Sold Out on You	Eom Seong-mi		
2026	See You at Work Tomorrow!	Choi Su-jin		

=== Web series ===
Year	Title	Role	Ref.
2022	Anna	Ji-won	

== Accolades ==
=== Awards and nominations ===
Name of the award ceremony, year presented, category, nominee of the award, and the result of the nomination
Award ceremony	Year	Category	Nominee / Work	Result	Ref.
Director's Cut Awards	2023	Best New Actress in a Series	Anna	Won	

=== Listicles ===
Name of publisher, year listed, name of listicle, and placement
Publisher	Year	Listicle	Placement	Ref.
Cine21	2017	7 female actors who are expected to be active in the future	Placed	
