= Anna (South Korean TV series) =

2022 South Korean television series

- Promotional poster
- Also known as: Second Anna (former)
- Hangul: 안나
- RR: Anna
- MR: Anna
- Genre: Psychological thriller
- Based on: Intimate Stranger by Chung Han-ah
- Written by: Lee Joo-young
- Directed by: Lee Joo-young
- Starring: Bae Suzy; Jung Eun-chae; Kim Jun-han; Park Ye-young
- Music by: Devin
- Country of origin: South Korea
- Original language: Korean
- No. of episodes: 6

Production
- Executive producers: Ahn Hye-yeon (Coupang Play); Kim Seung-han (Coupang Play); Lee Yoon-geol (Content Map Co. Ltd.)
- Producer: Woo Se-jin (Coupang Play)
- Cinematography: Lee Ui-tae
- Editor: Studio Briv
- Running time: 45–61 minutes
- Production company: Content Map Co. Ltd.

Original release
- Network: Coupang Play
- Release: June 24 – July 8, 2022

Anna (Korean: 안나) is a 2022 South Korean television series, written and directed by Lee Joo-young, and starring Bae Suzy in the title role, along with Jung Eun-chae, Kim Jun-han, and Park Ye-young. It premiered on Coupang Play, on June 24, 2022.

== Synopsis ==
The series tells the story of a woman who lives a completely different life starting with a small lie.

== Cast ==
=== Main ===
- Bae Suzy as Lee Yumi / Lee Anna
  - Kim Soo-in as 14-year-old Yumi
  - Choi So-yul as 6-year-old Yumi

A woman who loses her true identity and starts living a new, unpredictable life under a new name because of a minor lie that she made up.

- Jung Eun-chae as Lee Hyeon-ju

Yumi's former boss. Born into wealthy family, she runs a gallery owned by her father where Yumi was a terminal employee.

- Kim Jun-han as Choi Ji-hoon

Yumi's husband. An ambitious, goal-oriented man. He is the CEO of a promising venture company, his own business he started at a young age.

- Park Ye-young as Ji-won

Yumi's only confidant. A senior in the editorial department of a university school magazine.

=== Supporting ===
- Kim Jung-young as Hong-joo

Yumi's mute mother.

- Choi Yong-jin as Lee Sang-ho

Yumi's father, a tailor.

- Heo Hyeong-gyu as Kang Jae-ho

A college student Yumi dated while she was pretending to be a college student.

- Woo Ji-hyun as Seon-woo

An employee at a restaurant owned by Hyeon-ju.

- Kim Soo-jin as Chief Kim

An employee at Hyeon-ju's company who took care of Yumi.

- Oh Man-seok as Mr. Lee

Hyeon-ju's father and owner of the gallery where Yumi worked.

- Baek Ji-won as Hyeon-ju's mother

The director of the gallery where Yumi worked.

- Yoon Ji-min as Professor Yoon
- Hong Hee-won as Secretary Jung
- Chu Kwi-jung as Jae-ho's mother
- Jang Ha-eun as Narae, student at Yale University.
- Lee Je-yeon as Music teacher
- Park Soo-yeon as Secretary Cho Yu-mi

== Production ==
Filming of the series began on October 15, 2021 and concluded on March 23, 2022.

== Controversy ==
On August 2, 2022, director Lee Joo-young accused Coupang Play for making major edits to the series without her consent. Though the final version of the series submitted by Lee was consisted of 8 episodes (45–61 minutes per episode), the series which premiered on July 24 consisted of 6 episodes (45–63 minutes per episode). Lee had requested to remove her name in the credits for director and screenplay, but that was ignored.

In a statement a day later, Coupang Play explained that they found that the director's editing was significantly different from what was initially agreed with them but when they requested multiple times to edit according to what was agreed, director refused it. Hence Coupang Play edited the work to match the original production intent, with the consent of the producer and in accordance with the rights stipulated in the contract. However, director Lee's side stated that she neither received request for corrections nor has she refused to do so. Further more, both Lee and editor Kim Jung-hoon claimed that they never received any opinions regarding editing from Coupang Play.

Previously on July 8, Coupang Play had announced to release an extended version of the series in August. Amidst the controversy, it was revealed to be the director's cut which consists of 8 episodes. It was released on August 12.

== Viewership ==
Anna was announced to be broadcast on MBC, with two episodes airing every Sunday for three weeks at 21:10 (KST) starting from August 23, 2026.

Anna : South Korea viewers per episode (thousands)

Season	Episode number						Average
Season	1	2	3	4	5	6	Average
1	N/A	979	N/A	838	N/A	683	N/A

Source: Audience measurement performed nationwide by Nielsen Korea.

Average TV viewership ratings
Ep.	Original broadcast date	Average audience share (Nielsen Korea)	
Ep.	Original broadcast date	Nationwide	Seoul
1	August 23, 2026	—N/a	—N/a
2	August 23, 2026	5.2% (6th)	5.0% (5th)
3	August 30, 2026	—N/a	—N/a
4	August 30, 2026	4.3% (11th)	4.4% (7th)
5	September 6, 2026	—N/a	—N/a
6	September 6, 2026	3.9% (8th)	3.5% (9th)
Average		—	—
In the table above, the blue numbers represent the lowest ratings and the red numbers represent the highest ratings.; This drama aired on a cable channel/pay TV which normally has a relatively smaller audience compared to free-to-air TV/public broadcasters (KBS, SBS, MBC, and EBS).

== Accolades ==
Award ceremony	Year	Category	Nominee	Result	Ref.
APAN Star Awards	2022	Top Excellence Award, Actress in an OTT Drama	Bae Suzy	Nominated	
APAN Star Awards	2022	Excellence Award, Actress in an OTT Drama	Jung Eun-chae	Nominated	
APAN Star Awards	2022	Best Supporting Actress	Baek Ji-won	Won	
Baeksang Arts Awards	2023	Best Director	Lee Joo-young	Nominated	
Baeksang Arts Awards	2023	Best Actress	Bae Suzy	Nominated	
Baeksang Arts Awards	2023	Best Supporting Actor	Kim Jun-han	Nominated	
Baeksang Arts Awards	2023	Best Supporting Actress	Jung Eun-chae	Nominated	
Blue Dragon Series Awards	2023	Best Actress	Bae Suzy	Won	
Blue Dragon Series Awards	2023	Best Supporting Actor	Kim Jun-han	Nominated	
Blue Dragon Series Awards	2023	Best Supporting Actress	Jung Eun-chae	Nominated	
Director's Cut Awards	2023	Best Actress in Television	Bae Suzy	Won	
Director's Cut Awards	2023	Best New Actress in Television	Park Ye-young	Won	
Director's Cut Awards	2023	Best Actress in Television	Jung Eun-chae	Nominated	
Director's Cut Awards	2023	Best New Actor in Television	Choi Yong-jin	Nominated	
Grand Bell Awards	2022	Series Film Director Award	Lee Joo-young	Won	
Seoul International Drama Awards	2023	Best Actress	Bae Suzy	Won	
Seoul International Drama Awards	2023	Best Mini-series	Anna	Nominated	
