= I'm Solo (TV program) =

South Korean reality variety show

- Promotional poster
- Hangul: 나는 솔로
- RR: Naneun sollo
- MR: Nanŭn sollo
- Genre: Reality television
- Directed by: Nam Gyu-hong
- Starring: Defconn; Lee Yi-kyung; Song Haena
- Country of origin: South Korea
- Original language: Korean
- No. of seasons: 34
- No. of episodes: 279

Production
- Producer: Nam Gyu-hong
- Camera setup: Multi-camera
- Running time: 80 minutes
- Production companies: ENA, SBS Plus

Original release
- Network: ENA, SBS Plus
- Release: July 14, 2021 – present

Related
- I'm Solo: Love Continues (spin-off)

I'm Solo (Korean: 나는 Solo) is a South Korean television entertainment program, distributed and syndicated by ENA and SBS Plus, that started airing in 2021. It is aired every Wednesday at 10:30 p.m. And there is a spin-off version titled I'm Solo: Love Continues.

== Format ==
I'm Solo is a hyper-realistic dating program where single men and women eager to get married struggle to find love. This program has rules that each participant must follow, but there is no script.

The participants consist of 6 men and 6 women, making a total of 12 people. All participants live together in one camp which is called Solo Country for 5 days and must go on dates according to the rules set by the production team. In Solo Country, each participant is temporarily assigned a pseudonym, and all the names are based on the most commonly used names in South Korea during the 1950s and 1960s. On the final day, there is a time for final confessions, and if two people confess to each other mutually, a couple is formed.

After the final episode of the season has aired, a live broadcast is held on YouTube. In this live session, the cast members from the season come together to talk about what they've been up to since filming ended.

Due to high viewer ratings, various news articles about the participants are published after each episode, and after the season ends, the participants essentially go on to become Influencer.

Participants are reportedly paid an appearance fee of around 1 million won.
