= Inspector Koo =

2021 South Korean television series

- Promotional poster
- Hangul: 구경이
- RR: Gu Gyeongi
- MR: Ku Kyŏngi
- Genre: Action; Thriller; Comedy
- Written by: Sung Cho-yi (Note: Sung Cho-yi is actually the pen name of two film writers who decided to write dramas together as a duo. This was revealed in an exclusive interview that the writers had with Cine21. As of 2023, they are currently signed under KeyEast.)
- Directed by: Lee Jung-heum
- Starring: Lee Young-ae; Kim Hye-jun; Kim Hae-sook; Kwak Sun-young; Baek Sung-chul; Cho Hyun-chul
- Composer: Kim Tae-seong
- Country of origin: South Korea
- Original language: Korean
- No. of episodes: 12

Production
- Executive producer: Sung Min-seon
- Producers: Park Seong-hye; Kim Young-bae; Park Seong-eun; Kim Ji-won; Park Woo-ram; Yoon Jae-soon
- Cinematography: Hwang Min-sik; Han Seung-hoon
- Editor: Shin Min-kyung
- Running time: 70 minutes
- Production companies: KeyEast; Group8; JTBC Studios

Original release
- Network: JTBC
- Release: October 30 – December 12, 2021

Inspector Koo (Korean: 구경이) is a 2021 South Korean television series starring Lee Young-ae in the title role, alongside Kim Hye-jun, Kim Hae-sook, Kwak Sun-young, Baek Sung-chul and Cho Hyun-chul. The series is about the battle of a former police officer against a female college student who is a serial killer. It aired on JTBC from October 30 to December 12, 2021, every Saturday and Sunday at 22:30 (KST). It is also available for streaming on Netflix in selected regions.

== Synopsis ==
It follows the story of Koo Kyung-yi (Lee Young-ae), whose world is all about games and alcohol, as she digs into a mysterious serial murder case completely disguised as an accident.

== Cast ==
=== Main ===
- Lee Young-ae as Koo Kyung-yi, an intelligent policewoman-turned-insurance investigator in her 40s who investigates a murder case.
- Kim Hye-jun as K / Song Yi-kyung (real name), a mysterious college student and a passionate amateur theater actress.
- Kim Hae-sook as Yong Sook (Director Yong), the director of a foundation.
- Kwak Sun-young as Na Je-hee, the head of NT Life Insurance's investigation team.
- Baek Sung-chul as Santa / Han Kwang-wook, Kyung-yi's assistant.
- Cho Hyun-chul as Oh Kyung-soo, an investigator at NT Life Insurance.

=== Supporting ===
==== People around K ====
- Lee Hong-nae as Geon-wook, K's supporter.
- Bae Hae-sun as Jung-yeon, K's aunt.

==== People around Director Yong ====
- Jung Seok-yong as Manager Kim
- Choi Dae-chul as Heo Sung-tae, Director Yong's eldest son.
- Park Ji-bin as Heo Hyun-tae, Director Yong's second son.

=== Extended ===
- Choi Young-joon as Jang Seong-woo, a high school theater teacher.

=== Special appearances ===
- Kim Kang-hyun as Kim Min-gyu
- Park Ye-young as Yoon Jae-young
- Park Kang-seop as Dae-ho
- Shin Yoon-seop as Park Gyu-il
- Kim Soo-ro as Gotham
- Ahn Shin-woo as Security team leader

== Production ==
- Early working title of the series is Incredible Koo Kyung-yi (경이로운 구경이; Gyeongiroun Gu Gyeongi).
- The first script reading of the cast was held in May 2021, and filming started the next month.

== Viewership ==
Inspector Koo : South Korea viewers per episode (thousands)

Season	Episode number											
Season	1	2	3	4	5	6	7	8	9	10	11	12
1	599	571	468	647	454	650	513	553	N/A	454	N/A	598

Source: Audience measurement performed nationwide by Nielsen Korea

Average TV viewership ratings
Ep.	Original broadcast date	Average audience share (Nielsen Korea)	
Ep.	Original broadcast date	Nationwide	Seoul
1	October 30, 2021	2.640% (7th)	2.666% (5th)
2	October 31, 2021	2.642% (N/A)	3.027% (7th)
3	November 6, 2021	2.305% (10th)	2.241% (10th)
4	November 7, 2021	2.747% (10th)	3.464% (5th)
5	November 13, 2021	1.809% (N/A)	N/A
6	November 14, 2021	2.548% (8th)	3.036% (7th)
7	November 20, 2021	1.800% (N/A)	2.510% (7th)
8	November 21, 2021	2.185% (N/A)	2.717% (9th)
9	December 4, 2021	1.699% (N/A)	N/A
10	December 5, 2021	1.808% (N/A)	N/A
11	December 11, 2021	1.515% (N/A)	N/A
12	December 12, 2021	2.312% (N/A)	2.864% (7th)
Average		2.168%	— (Note: Due to some unpublished ratings, the exact average rating is unknown.)
In the table above, the blue numbers represent the lowest ratings and the red numbers represent the highest ratings.; N/A denotes that the rating/ranking is not known.; This series aired on a cable channel/pay TV which normally has a relatively smaller audience compared to free-to-air TV/public broadcasters (KBS, SBS, MBC and EBS).

== Awards and nominations ==
Name of the award ceremony, year presented, category, nominee of the award, and the result of the nomination
Award ceremony	Year	Category	Recipient	Result	Ref.
Baeksang Arts Awards	2022	Best New Actress – Television	Kim Hye-jun	Won	
Bechdel Day	2022	Bechdel's Choice 5	Inspector Koo	Won	
Bechdel Day	2022	Best Actress	Lee Young-ae	Won	
Bechdel Day	2022	Producer	Park Seong-hye	Won	
