= Kim Ji-sung (actress) =

South Korean actress (born 1996)

- Born: 30 October 1996 (age 29); Hwaseong, Gyeonggi Province, South Korea
- Other name: Kim Ji-seong
- Education: School of Performing Arts Seoul; Chung-Ang University
- Occupation: Actress
- Years active: 2016–present
- Agent: N Company Entertainment
- Known for: Mysterious Personal Shopper; Graceful Friends; How to Be Thirty

Kim Ji-sung (Korean: 김지성) is a South Korean actress and beauty pageant titleholder. She is known for her roles in dramas such as Mysterious Personal Shopper (2018), Graceful Friends (2020), and How to Be Thirty (2021). She also appeared in movies Coffee Mate (2016), Park Hwa-young (2017) and The Way (2017).

She debuted in 2016 as a contestant in Mnet's girl group survival show Produce 101.

== Filmography ==
=== Television series ===
Year	Title	Role	Ref.
2016	The Miracle	Hye-jung	
2017	Circle	Kim Nan-hee	
2017	School 2017	Ham Yoon-hee	
2017	A Korean Odyssey	Ghost	
2018	Welcome to Waikiki	Ah-young	
2018	Mysterious Personal Shopper	Hong Kang-hee	
2018	Ms. Hammurabi	Kim Da-in	
2019	He Is Psychometric	Ji-sung	
2020	Graceful Friends	Na Ae-ra / Kang Mi-ra	
2021	How to Be Thirty	Lee Hye-ryeong	
2024	Nothing Uncovered	Ju Yeong-seok	
2024–2025	Cinderella Game	Goo Ji-eun	

=== Web series ===
Year	Title	Role	Ref.
2017	A Touch On Your Cheek	Song-joo	
2017	The Sound of Footsteps	Seon-woo	

=== Television shows ===
Year	Title	Role	Note	Ref.
2016	Produce 101	Herself	Contestant under Dreamcatcher Company	

=== Film ===
Year	Title	Role	Ref.
2017	Coffee Mate	Young Yoon-jae	
2017	The Way	Young Soon-ae	
2018	Park Hwa-young	Kim Ji-seong	
2021	Anna, Mary	Mary	
