= Baek Sung-chul =

South Korean actor (born 1999)

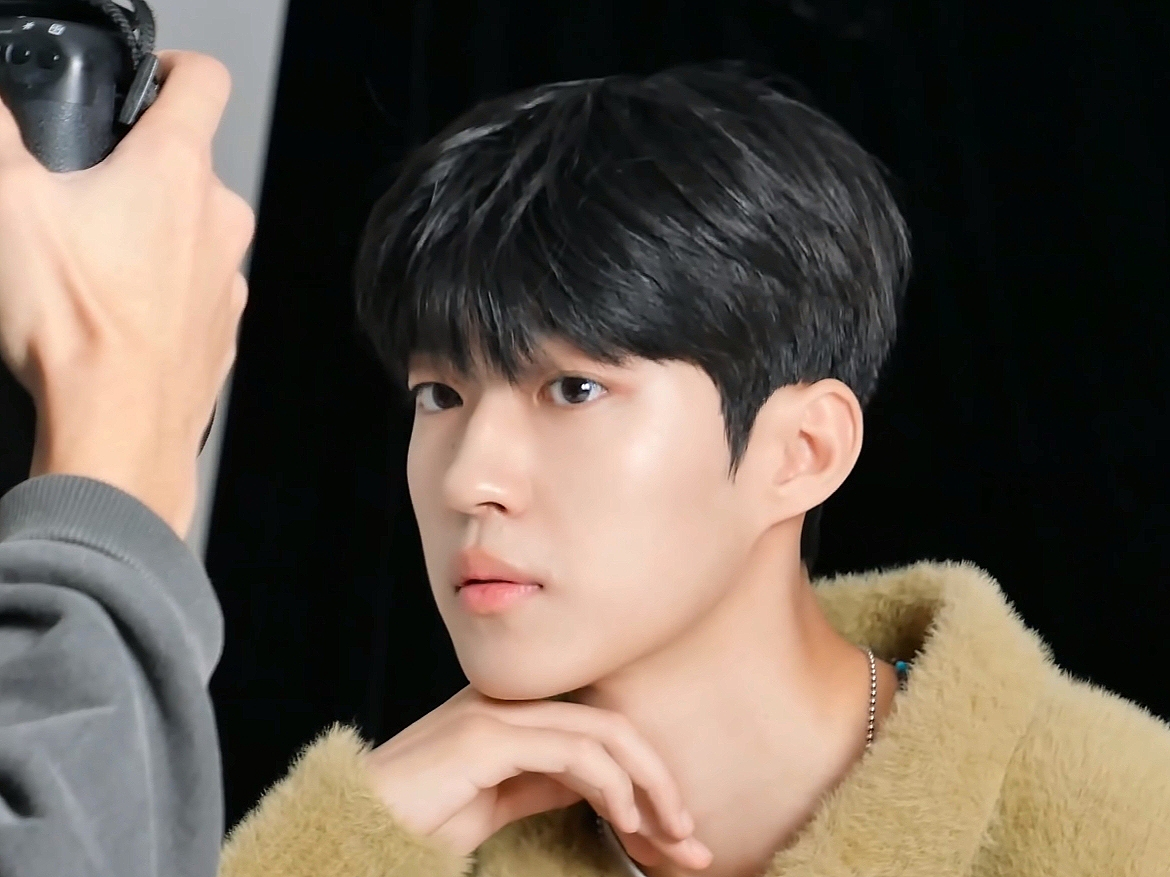
- Baek in November 2021
- Born: March 10, 1999 (age 27); South Korea
- Occupations: Actor; model
- Years active: 2019–present
- Agents: ESteem; KN Studio

Korean name
- Hangul: 백성철
- RR: Baek Seongcheol
- MR: Paek Sŏngch'ŏl

Baek Sung-chul (Korean: 백성철) is a South Korean model and actor. He is best known in Tell Me That You Love Me (2023–2024).

== Career ==
Baek Sung-chul debuted as a model at the 2019 F/W Seoul Fashion Week and began his acting career in 2021 with Kakao TV's How to Be Thirty. He is best known playing the role of young Cha Jin-woo in Tell Me That You Love Me, which ended in January 2024.

According to OSEN interview on April 30, 2024, Baek signed an exclusive contract with KN Studio.

== Filmography ==
=== Television series ===
Year	Title	Role	Ref.
2021	How to Be Thirty	Hyung Joon-young	
2021	The Witch's Diner	Ko Hyun-woo	
2021	Inspector Koo	Santa	
2022	Once Upon a Small Town	Lee Sang-hyun	
2023–2024	Tell Me That You Love Me	Cha Jin-woo (young)	
2024	Brewing Love	Oh Chan-hwi	
2026	Dream to You	Shim Yoo-geon	
