= The Way (2017 film) =

- Theatrical release poster
- Hangul: 길
- RR: Gil
- MR: Kil
- Directed by: Jung In-bong
- Screenplay by: Kim Sung-won; Jung In-bong
- Produced by: Jung In-bong; Choi Yoon-suk; Lee Sung-pho
- Starring: Kim Hye-ja; Song Jae-ho; Heo Jin
- Cinematography: Lee Young-jin; Kim Dong-hyuk
- Edited by: Lee Gyu-youn
- Music by: Lee Jae-rang
- Distributed by: Double & Joy Pictures
- Release dates: April 28, 2017 (JIFF); May 11, 2017 (South Korea)
- Running time: 86 minutes
- Country: South Korea
- Language: Korean
- Box office: US$64,002

The Way (Korean: 길) is a 2017 South Korean drama film directed by Jung In-bong. The film stars Kim Hye-ja, Song Jae-ho and Heo Jin.

== Plot ==
Three interlocking stories whose characters dream of a new start and love: Soon-ae, who lives alone; Sang-bum, who has spent his entire life supporting his family; and Su-mi, who is recovering from a tragedy.

== Cast ==
- Kim Hye-ja as Soon-ae
- Song Jae-ho as Sang-bum
- Heo Jin as Su-mi
- On Joo-wan
- Ji An as Sang-bum's first love
- Kim Ji-sung as Young Soon-ae
- Lee Seong-deuk
- Park Hyeok-kwon
- Kim Seung-hyeon as Joong-gwang
- Ahn Hye-kyeong as Byung-chul's wife
- Shin Won-ho as Yoon-suk
- Jo Yun-seo as Sang-bum's granddaughter
