= KakaoTV =

South Korean online streaming platform

- Screenshot of the homepage on July 20, 2021
- Developer: Kakao Entertainment (Kakao)
- Type: OTT platform
- Launched: June 16, 2015; 11 years ago
- Discontinued: June 30, 2026
- Status: Discontinued
- Members: 3.07 million (as of September 21, 2020)
- Availability: South Korea
- Website: tv.kakao.com

KakaoTV was a South Korean over-the-top, advertising-based and pay-per-view streaming television service, and personal broadcasting and video platform owned by Kakao Entertainment that launched on June 16, 2015. On March 5, 2026, KakaoTV announced that they will shut down on June 30, 2026, alerting users of this by way of pop-up notices when the users log in.

== History ==
On June 16, 2015, KakaoTV was officially released. Initially, it was a website similar to Naver TV in the way that it offered the streaming broadcasts from affiliated or contracted broadcasters.

On November 6, 2015, Kakao launched the "KakaoTV Live Open Chat" function which links KakaoTV's live broadcasts and Kakao Talk's open chat, allowing viewers to chat while streaming a program.

On February 18, 2017, Daum tvPot was integrated with KakaoTV. In 2017, KakaoTV attracted only 1.8% of streaming video viewers according to a survey of 7,426 online video streaming users.

On September 1, 2020, Kakao M (now Kakao Entertainment M Company) expanded the service area of KakaoTV to OTT as it needed a platform to distribute its own dramas, entertainment programs and films. It accumulated 13 million views one week after its launch, 58 million views after a month and 106 million views after three months.

While most content is short-form series with episode runtimes of 10 to 20 minutes, some created in vertical format for mobile users, KakaoTV also includes "mid-form" dramas with episodes ranging around 30 minutes.

== Original programming ==
=== Drama ===
Title	Genre	Premiere	Finale	Seasons	Runtime
Amanza	Fantasy drama	September 1, 2020	November 3, 2020	1 season, 10 episodes	15–19 min.
Love Revolution	Teen drama	September 1, 2020	December 27, 2020	1 season, 30 episodes	18–23 min.
No, Thank You	Melodrama	November 21, 2020	March 26, 2022	2 seasons, 24 episodes	19–26 min.
Lovestruck in the City	Romantic comedy	December 22, 2020	February 16, 2021	1 season, 17 episodes	29–39 min.
A Love So Beautiful	Coming-of-age romantic comedy	December 28, 2020	February 20, 2021	1 season, 24 episodes	21–25 min.
How to Be Thirty	Romantic comedy	February 23, 2021	April 13, 2021	1 season, 15 episodes	19–21 min.
Mad for Each Other	Romance	May 24, 2021	June 21, 2021	1 season, 13 episodes	29–39 min.
Start Up the Engine	Slice of life romantic drama	June 29, 2021	July 20, 2021	1 season, 4 episodes	19–27 min.
The Great Shaman Ga Doo-shim	Coming-of-age fantasy drama	July 30, 2021	October 8, 2021	1 season, 12 episodes	19–21 min.
Jinx	Fantasy drama	October 6, 2021	November 6, 2021	1 season, 10 episodes	16–24 min.
Would You Like a Cup of Coffee?	Slice of life	October 24, 2021	December 2, 2021	1 season, 12 episodes	24–31 min.
Fly, Again	Coming-of-age drama	November 13, 2021	December 15, 2021	1 season, 10 episodes	28–35 min.
NEW Love and War	Romance anthology	November 18, 2021	December 26, 2021	1 season, 24 episodes	21–29 min.
Shadow Beauty	Romantic drama	November 20, 2021	December 29, 2021	1 season, 13 episodes	20–24 min.
Mr. Lee	Mystery	November 29, 2021	December 27, 2021	1 season, 5 episodes	18–21 min.
Pumpkin Time	Coming-of-age fantasy drama	December 17, 2021	December 18, 2021	1 season, 10 episodes	20–23 min.
Love & Wish	Coming-of-age	December 24, 2021	December 25, 2021	1 season, 9 episodes	16–18 min.
Her Bucket List	Romance	December 31, 2021	December 31, 2021	1 season, 10 episodes	17–19 min.
Welcome to Wedding Hell	Romance	May 23, 2022	June 15, 2022	1 season, 12 episodes	34–44 min.
Once Upon a Small Town	Romantic comedy	September 5, 2022	September 28, 2022	1 season, 12 episodes	32–40 min.
The Blue House Family	Political drama	TBA	TBA	1 season, 10 episodes	TBA
Goosebumps	Horror	TBA	TBA	1 season, 8 episodes	TBA
Beware of Your Boyfriend	Romance	TBA	TBA	TBA	TBA
Aquaman	Romance	TBA	TBA	TBA	TBA
Is It Fun, Unrequited Love?	Romance	TBA	TBA	TBA	TBA
Bunny and Her Boys	Romance	TBA	TBA	TBA	TBA

=== Entertainment ===
Title	Genre	Premiere	Finale	Seasons	Runtime
Wannabe Ryan	Survival	September 1, 2020	November 20, 2020	1 season, 16 episodes	20–24 min.
KakaoTV Morning	Variety	September 1, 2020	February 4, 2021	1 season, 103 episodes	11–40 min.
Face ID	Reality	September 1, 2020	February 8, 2021	1 season, 22 episodes	14–22 min.
Zzin Kyung Kyu	Reality	September 1, 2020	TBA	TBA	15–27 min.
Si Bel Homme	Sitcom	September 11, 2020	October 2, 2020	1 season, 14 episodes	5–8 min.
Comeback Show MU: Talk Live	Music	September 14, 2020	November 16, 2020	1 season, 9 episodes	43–97 min.
Fandom Tour	Travel documentary	September 19, 2020	January 2, 2021	1 season, 16 episodes	15–21 min.
Learn Way	Reality	September 20, 2020	February 25, 2022	2 season, 60 episodes	13–19 min.
Fake Men 2	Reality	October 1, 2020	November 27, 2020	1 season, 8 episodes	22–59 min.
Ateez Fever Road	Adventure reality	October 26, 2020	November 19, 2020	1 season, 8 episodes	17–25 min.
Sing Again Open Source	Music	December 10, 2020	February 25, 2021	1 season, 12 episodes	18–24 min.
March of the Ants Chap 2	Reality	December 23, 2020	February 10, 2021	1 season, 8 episodes	33–40 min.
The Shop Next to the Best	Cooking show	February 6, 2021	TBA	TBA	20–29 min.
The Real Big Brain Genius	Reality	February 17, 2021	TBA	TBA	11–15 min.
March of the Ants Chap 3	Reality	February 24, 2021	April 29, 2021	1 season, 10 episodes	31–43 min.
Antenna TV: Clumsy Antenna	Reality	October 7, 2021	TBA	TBA	15–40min.
The Origin – A, B, Or What?	Reality	March 19, 2022	May 7, 2022	1 season, 8 episodes	60–90 min.
Girls Reverse	Survival	January 2, 2023	TBA	TBA	TBA

=== Film ===
Title	Genre	Premiere	Runtime
Live Your Strength	Romance	September 4, 2020	12 min.
P1H: A New World Begins	Science fiction musical	October 8, 2020	1 hour, 39 min.
Night Trip	Mystery	TBA	TBA

=== Live shows ===
Title	Genre	Premiere	Runtime
Suzy: A Tempo	Concert film	January 23, 2021	2 hours
Park Seo-joon, Comma	Fanmeeting	May 15, 2021	2 hours, 25 min.
Choi Woo-shik's A Midsummer Night's Dream	Fanmeeting	July 5, 2021	1 hour, 58 min.
