= Lovestruck in the City =

2020 South Korean romantic comedy web series

- Promotional poster
- Also known as: How to Love Between Men and Women in the City; The Way of Love for Men and Women in the City; City Men and Women Love Methods; City Couple's Way of Love: My Lovable Camera Thief
- Hangul: 도시남녀의 사랑법
- Hanja: 都市男女의 사랑法
- RR: Dosinamnyeoui sarangbeop
- MR: Tosinamnyŏŭi sarangbŏp
- Genre: Romance
- Written by: Jung Hyun-jung; Jung Da-yun
- Directed by: Park Shin-woo
- Starring: Ji Chang-wook; Kim Ji-won; Kim Min-seok; Han Ji-eun; Ryu Kyung-soo; So Joo-yeon
- Country of origin: South Korea
- Original language: Korean
- No. of episodes: 17

Production
- Executive producers: Jang Sai-jung; Hwang Jee-woo
- Producers: Choi Kyung-sook; Kim Min-ji; Jeon Woo-min; Jeon Ryeo-kyung
- Editor: Kim Na-young
- Camera setup: Kim Chun-suk; Kim Jin-hwan
- Running time: 28–40 minutes
- Production companies: Kakao M; Story & Pictures Media

Original release
- Network: KakaoTV
- Release: December 22, 2020 – February 16, 2021

Lovestruck in the City (Korean: 도시남녀의 사랑법; RR: dosinamnyeoui sarangbeop; lit. 'The Way of Love of City Men and Women') is a South Korean television series starring Ji Chang-wook and Kim Ji-won. Directed by Park Shin-woo, the series portrays the love stories of young people navigating life in a busy city.

The series, the first instalment in the multi-part City Couple's Way of Love project, premiered on KakaoTV on December 22, 2020, and was released every Tuesday and Friday at 17:00 (KST). It is available internationally on Netflix.

== Synopsis ==
The series is presented in an interview format, with six individuals discussing their experiences with dating.

== Cast ==
=== Main ===
- Ji Chang-wook as Park Jae-won, a 32-year-old architect. who team leader of the first architectural team at "Working People", firm founded by his father and uncle. He is honest, positive, and likable, always kind to everyone. He cannot forget the "camera thief”, a woman who stole his heart and then disappeared. He is Kyung-joon's cousin.
- Kim Ji-won as Lee Eun-oh / Yoon Seon-ah, a 29-year-old freelance marketer. CEO of a marketing agency, "Marketing Agency O3”, that she founded less than a year ago, the one-person company is on the verge of starvation. A true Seongsu-dong resident, she repays any blow with two strikes and doesn't hesitate to act impulsively. She lives an ordinary life but adopts an alter ego “Yoon Seon-ah”, while using this identity at Yangyang Beach, she meets Park Jae-won and falls in love with him.
- Kim Min-seok as Choi Kyeong-jun, a 29-year-old architect and Assistant Manager of the first architecture team of the “Working People”, a firm founded by his father and uncle. A cynical observer of worldly affairs. Rin-i's boyfriend and Jae-won's cousin.
- So Joo-yeon as Seo Rin-i, a 29-year-old part-timer with multiple jobs and Kyeong-jun's girlfriend. She is close friends with both Kang Geon and Eun-oh. A freelancer with a solid, four-dimensional world of her own. She decided to live a "life of doing what she wants and living hand-to-mouth" instead of a "stable life of doing things she doesn't want to do”.
- Ryu Kyung-soo as Kang Geon, a 29-year-old novelist who has not dated in two years. A rookie in the literary world who won a literary award the year he graduated from college, he is now a writer living in a small studio who has yet to publish a single collection of short stories. He is Eun-oh's roommate and best friend.
- Han Ji-eun as Oh Seon-yeong, a 30-year-old high school physical education teacher who describes herself as a serial dater; Geon's ex-girlfriend.

=== Supporting ===
- Son Jong-hak as CEO Park, Jae-won's father and Kyeong-jun's uncle
- Hong Su-zu as Hae-na, an actress
- Lee Suk-hyung as Kang Byung-joon, a police officer

=== Special appearances ===
- Lee Sang-yoon as Go Gyeong-gu
- Lee Sang-woo as Bin, the owner of "Bin-Bin Surfing" (Ep. 1, 3–4, 12)
- Park Jin-joo as Ra-ra, the owner of a beachfront ramyeon shack (Ep. 1, 3–4, 12)
- Choi Min-ho as Oh Dong-sik, a police officer
- Pyo Ye-jin as Yoon Seon-ah
- Yang Dae-hyuk as Yoon Byung-soo, Hae-na's manager
- Marychou
- Jung Ji-hyun as a customer at Ra-ra's ramyeon shack
- Min Sang-woo as a customer at Ra-ra's ramyeon shack
- Hwang Hee as Cha Chi-hoon (Ep. 17)
- Kim Do-geon as Seon-yeong's ex-boyfriend (Ep. 7)

== Episodes ==
No.	Title	Directed by	Written by	Original release date
1	"Lovestruck in the City"	Park Shin-woo	Jung Hyun-jung & Jung Da-yun	December 22, 2020
In September 2019, Park Jae-won travels to the beachside town of Yangyang for surfing and stays in a camper. He meets Lee Eun-o, who is working part-time at Ra-ra's ramyeon shop under the alias Yoon Seon-a. She picks him up from the airport, and they are immediately attracted to each other.
2	"How Do You Initiate Your First Sex?"	Park Shin-woo	Jung Hyun-jung & Jung Da-yun	December 25, 2020
Seon-a teaches Jae-won how to drive a camper, while he teaches her surfing. They grow closer and share intimate moments, during which Jae-won confesses his love. The next morning, he sees her with someone else and feels betrayed.
3	"She Drove Me Crazy!"	Park Shin-woo	Jung Hyun-jung & Jung Da-yun	December 29, 2020
Seon-a ignores Jae-won while engaging in different activities, including beach ball surfing. Kang Geon and Oh Seon-yeong recall a fling from five years earlier. Jae-won, increasingly drawn to Seon-a, struggles with her aloofness, but she eventually develops feelings for him. In the present, both are shown missing each other.
4	"What Did She Do with the Ring?"	Park Shin-woo	Jung Hyun-jung & Jung Da-yun	January 1, 2021
Seon-a and Jae-won begin a whirlwind romance, dancing in the rain and staging a mock wedding after he proposes over the phone. They exchange rings, which Jae-won still wears. When suddenly called back to Seoul for work, he gives her his number and arranges a meeting, but she never contacts him again. In the present, she takes on a project for her own company, while Jae-won still wonders why she left.
5	"What Do You Do With the Memory Box After Breaking Up?"	Park Shin-woo	Jung Hyun-jung & Jung Da-yun	January 5, 2021
Jae-won recalls leaving three cameras with Seon-a before returning to Seoul, which he never recovered. Geon and Seon-yeong have a messy breakup, with Seon-yeong demanding the return of everything she bought for him. In the present, Eun-o still has Jae-won's film rolls and has them developed. The photographer recognises the man in the photos.
6	"Somebody Stole My Camera"	Park Shin-woo	Jung Hyun-jung & Jung Da-yun	January 8, 2021
The long history of Kyeong-jun and Rin-i's relationship is revealed, from childhood classmates to romantic partners. Eun-o, Geon, Kyeong-jun, and Rin-i are shown as close friends. Eun-o admits that one reason she never contacted Jae-won again was discovering he was Kyeong-jun's cousin. She narrowly avoids running into Jae-won.
7	"I'll Forget It! I'll Throw It Away!"	Park Shin-woo	Jung Hyun-jung & Jung Da-yun	January 12, 2021
After unexpectedly encountering Seon-a, Jae-won drinks heavily and demands that the police find the "camera thief." It is revealed that Geon, Eun-o, and Rin-i have been friends since kindergarten. Jae-won and Eun-o both attempt to discard the surfboards they once painted together, but only Eun-o succeeds.
8	"Love Is Supposed to Be Crazy"	Park Shin-woo	Jung Hyun-jung & Jung Da-yun	January 15, 2021
Jae-won, troubled by drinking and his obsession with Seon-a, consults a therapist. He suspects he hallucinates her presence, but Eun-o reveals that one of their encounters was real. When he decides to move on, Seon-a appears again and is arrested as the "camera thief."
9	"What if You Run Into Your Ex?"	Park Shin-woo	Jung Hyun-jung & Jung Da-yun	January 19, 2021
Geon and Seon-yeong reconnect after their breakup, though his close friendships continue to cause conflict. Jae-won learns Seon-a's true identity during questioning at the police station. Shocked and betrayed, he throws away his ring, while Seon-a desperately tries to explain.
10	"Lee Eun-o? Lee Eun-o!"	Park Shin-woo	Jung Hyun-jung & Jung Da-yun	January 22, 2021
Eun-o attempts to recover the surfboard she had discarded. The others learn that Jae-won has caught the "camera thief" and speculate about her identity. Geon notices Eun-o behaving strangely. Meanwhile, Jae-won finally realises that Eun-o is connected to Kyeong-jun.
11	"Is There Such a Thing as a Proper Break-Up?"	Park Shin-woo	Jung Hyun-jung & Jung Da-yun	January 26, 2021
The group debates the concept of a healthy breakup. Jae-won grows suspicious of Eun-o's past after overhearing a call. At a rooftop dinner, he maintains composure in front of the others but later states that everything he knew about her was a lie, explaining why he discarded his ring.
12	"That's How I Became Yoon Seon-a"	Park Shin-woo	Jung Hyun-jung & Jung Da-yun	January 29, 2021
During rooftop camping, tensions rise as Jae-won and Eun-o argue indirectly about the past. Later, Eun-o's backstory is revealed, showing how she became Yoon Seon-a. She wakes up the next morning to find herself in Jae-won's apartment.
13	"Have You Ever Blacked Out?"	Park Shin-woo	Jung Hyun-jung & Jung Da-yun	February 2, 2021
Eun-o spends the night at Jae-won's apartment. Despite awkwardness the next morning, he helps her home in the rain. Later, Geon and Rin-i see them together, raising questions about their relationship.
14	"What Kind of Woman is She?"	Park Shin-woo	Jung Hyun-jung & Jung Da-yun	February 5, 2021
Tensions rise between Jae-won and Eun-o as they continue to clash. Rin-i loses her job but remains optimistic, refusing Kyeong-jun's offer to fund her education. Later, Jae-won and Eun-o argue passionately, leading to a kiss that reveals unresolved feelings.
15	"It's So Hard to Get Honest"	Park Shin-woo	Jung Hyun-jung & Jung Da-yun	February 9, 2021
Jae-won remains hopeful after their kiss, but Eun-o expresses regret despite acknowledging her feelings. They exchange belongings, and Eun-o begins explaining why she disappeared, admitting to being Seon-a. Meanwhile, Geon and Seon-yeong reflect on their past before parting ways.
16	"What Do You Think Love Is?"	Park Shin-woo	Jung Hyun-jung & Jung Da-yun	February 12, 2021
Geon reflects on his breakup with Seon-yeong, while Eun-o and Jae-won meet again through work. Jae-won suggests they try dating properly, and the two kiss, officially beginning a relationship.
17	"Winter, Midnight, Seoul"	Im Chae-rim, Lee Kyung-koo & Park Shin-woo	Jung Hyun-jung & Jung Da-yun	February 16, 2021
In the series finale, Eun-o assists actress Hae-na in leaving a filming set, while Oh Dong-sik's birthday celebration involves a chase and an unexpected surprise. Jae-won and Eun-o spend time together as snow falls and later meet on a rooftop, where Eun-o admits her uncertainty about herself. Jae-won reassures her, and the two decide to move forward together. Meanwhile, Kyeong-jun and Rin-i's relationship ends when Rin-i decides to break up with him. The drama concludes with the characters offering parting words and waving goodbye to the camera.

== Production ==
=== Development ===
The series was originally planned for 16 episodes but was extended to 17 episodes to include the romance of police officer Oh Dong-sik, played by Choi Min-ho.

=== Casting ===
In July 2020, Kim Ji-won and Ji Chang-wook were reported to be in talks to star in the series. In September 2020, Ji Chang-wook and Kim Ji-won were confirmed as the lead actors. Later that month, Kim Min-seok and So Joo-yeon were also confirmed to join the cast in supporting roles. The script reading took place in September 2020.

=== Filming ===
On November 12, 2020, still photographs from the series were released. Additional stills were released on November 19, 2020, alongside the announcement of the release date.

Filming was temporarily suspended on November 24, 2020, after an extra tested positive for COVID-19. On November 26, it was confirmed that Kim Ji-won tested negative for the virus. On December 4, 2020, character posters were released. The production team commented, "We aim to provide a variety of entertainment by presenting the stories of strong characters."

== Promotion and release ==
Ji Chang-wook, Kim Min-seok, and Ryu Kyung-soo, cast members of Lovestruck in the City, appeared in the 260th episode of the variety program Knowing Bros, which aired on December 19, 2020, to promote the series.

On December 2, 2020, it was officially announced that the premiere of the series, originally scheduled for December 8, was postponed to December 22 due to COVID-19 concerns and in consideration of on-site and staff safety.

== Original soundtrack ==
Lovestruck in the City OST

Soundtrack album by Various artists
- Released: 2020; 2021
- Genre: Soundtrack
- Languages: Korean; English
- Labels: Kakao M; Most Content

=== Part 1 ===
Released on January 1, 2021
No.	Title	Lyrics	Music	Artist	Length
1.	"One In A Million"	Nam Hye-seung; Park Jin-ho	Nam Hye-seung; Park Jin-ho	Suran	3:35
2.	"One In A Million" (Inst.)		Nam Hye-seung; Park Jin-ho		3:35
Total length:					7:10

=== Part 2 ===
Released on January 8, 2021
No.	Title	Lyrics	Music	Artist	Length
1.	"For Some Reason" (어쩐지 오늘)	Nam Hye-seung; Park Jin-ho	Nam Hye-seung; Park Jin-ho	John Park	3:37
2.	"For Some Reason" (Inst.)		Nam Hye-seung; Park Jin-ho		3:37
Total length:					7:14

=== Part 3 ===
Released on January 16, 2021
No.	Title	Lyrics	Music	Artist	Length
1.	"Love And Pain"	Nam Hye-seung; Park Jin-ho	Nam Hye-seung; Park Jin-ho	Lee Su-hyun	4:24
2.	"Love And Pain" (Inst.)		Nam Hye-seung; Park Jin-ho		4:24
Total length:					8:48

=== Part 4 ===
Released on January 22, 2021
No.	Title	Lyrics	Music	Artist	Length
1.	"Let Me Love You" (이런 난 어떠니)	Nam Hye-seung; Kim Kyung-hee	Nam Hye-seung; Kim Kyung-hee	Yurisangja	3:50
2.	"Let Me Love You" (Inst.)		Nam Hye-seung; Kim Kyung-hee		3:50
Total length:					7:40

=== Part 5 ===
Released on January 23, 2021
No.	Title	Lyrics	Music	Artist	Length
1.	"You" (니가)	Nam Hye-seung; Park Jin-ho	Nam Hye-seung; Park Jin-ho	K.Will	4:23
2.	"You" (Inst.)		Nam Hye-seung; Park Jin-ho		4:23
Total length:					8:46

=== Part 6 ===
Released on January 29, 2021
No.	Title	Lyrics	Music	Artist	Length
1.	"The Reason" (이유)	Nam Hye-seung; Park Jin-ho	Nam Hye-seung; Park Jin-ho	Seungkwan (Seventeen)	4:00
2.	"The Reason" (Inst.)		Nam Hye-seung; Park Jin-ho		4:00
Total length:					8:00

=== Part 7 ===
Released on January 30, 2021
No.	Title	Lyrics	Music	Artist	Length
1.	"Days to Remember"	Nam Hye-seung; Jello Ann	Nam Hye-seung; Park Sang-hee	Janet Suhh (Janetter)	2:43
2.	"Where Do I Go? (Feat. Kim Kyung-hee)"	Nam Hye-seung; Jello Ann	Nam Hye-seung; Park Sang-hee	Janet Suhh (Janetter)	3:22
3.	"So I Sing"	Nam Hye-seung; Jello Ann	Nam Hye-seung; Park Sang-hee	Janet Suhh (Janetter)	3:09
4.	"Days to Remember" (Inst.)		Nam Hye-seung; Park Sang-hee		2:43
5.	"Where Do I Go?" (Inst.)		Nam Hye-seung; Park Sang-hee		3:22
6.	"So I Sing" (Inst.)		Nam Hye-seung; Park Sang-hee		3:09
Total length:					18:28

=== Part 8 ===
Released on February 6, 2021
No.	Title	Lyrics	Music	Artist	Length
1.	"Kiss Me, Kiss Me" (Chorus by Kim Ki-won)	Nam Hye-seung; Jello Ann	Nam Hye-seung; Surf Green	Hong Isaac	3:52
2.	"Kiss Me, Kiss Me"		Nam Hye-seung; Surf Green		3:52
Total length:					7:44

=== Part 9 ===
Released on February 12, 2021
No.	Title	Lyrics	Music	Artist	Length
1.	"Thorn"	Lim Eun-a	Yoon Woo-hyun	Choa	4:25
2.	"Thorns"		Yoon Woo-hyun		4:25
Total length:					8:50

=== Part 10 ===
Released on February 13, 2021
No.	Title	Lyrics	Music	Artist	Length
1.	"Hello My Beach"	Nam Hye-seung, Kim Kyung hee, Jello Ann	Nam Hye-seung and Kim Kyung-hee	Rolling Stars	2:40
2.	"All Day"	Nam Hye-seung and Jello Ann	Nam Hye-seung, Park Sang-hee	Kim Kyung Hee	2:34
Total length:					5:14

=== Part 11 ===
Released on February 15, 2021
No.	Title	Lyrics	Music	Artist	Length
1.	"Lover"	Park Sung-wook	Marychou	Marychou	3:28
2.	"Lover" (Inst.)		Marychou		3:28
Total length:					6:56

=== Part 12 ===
Released on February 19, 2021
No.	Title	Lyrics	Music	Artist	Length
1.	"One span"	Nam Hye-seung and Jeon Jong-hyuk	Nam Hye-seung and Jeon Jong-hyuk	Motte	3:33
2.	"One span" (Inst.)		Nam Hye-seung and Jeon Jong-hyuk		3:33
Total length:					6:66

=== Part 13 ===
Released on February 20, 2021
No.	Title	Lyrics	Music	Artist	Length
1.	"Did You have to"	Hyeseung Nam, Kyunghee Kim, Shinwoo Park	Hyeseung Nam, Kyunghee Kim	CHIMMI (hobby)	3:13
2.	"Did You have to" (Inst.)		Hyeseung Nam, Kyunghee Kim		3:13
Total length:					6:26

== Reception ==
Joel Keller of Decider wrote that the six main characters are distinct from one another and noted similarities between Jae-won and Eun-o and the characters Ross and Rachel from the American sitcom Friends. He concluded that "Lovestruck in the City is a light rom-com that is a good entry into the world of K-dramas, because the character types are very familiar to people used to American and British sitcoms involving will-they-won't-they romances."
