= Personal broadcasting =

Personal broadcasting is the particular type of broadcasting where the individual broadcaster creates its own content by webcam or camcorder and transmits it through the Internet. It is the broadcasting that is personal, both in the context of production but also in the feel of the content. In this type of broadcasting, individuals are both editors and directors of its own broadcasting.

Personal broadcasting is most popularly used by individuals and event holders who want to broadcast one or an event for an audience to watch live over the Internet. Personal broadcasting gives individuals another way to interact with one another, and it gives brands another way to interact with their customers. Individual entrepreneurs use the personal broadcasting to boost their brands among young consumers.

Personal broadcasting differs from other types of broadcasting in a way that it has no fixed broadcasting time, and the broadcaster can freely choose the broadcasting content. Personal broadcasting is not limited to celebrities and public figures, but is produced by regular people too. Anybody, anywhere, at any time can broadcast themselves or their content for free. The market for personal broadcasting that allows ordinary individuals to broadcast themselves on the Internet is rapidly growing.

By personal broadcasting, individuals are free to stream any sort of broadcast they want and attract viewers, who can send real-time comments, or text messages displayed directly across the screens that the broadcaster can see and respond to. In this way, viewers can watch the videos of personal broadcasters and at the same time share their thoughts and feelings with others live.

Since the beginning of 2000s, personal broadcasting has been gaining a lot of interest from the public and it has become one of entertainment options. As the popularity of watching video increased, demand for the personal broadcasting was initiated, and the rise of penetration of the Smartphone, equipped with high-definition cameras, and a new generation of video applications, enabled individuals to broadcast straight from one’s own mobile device whenever they like and wherever they may be.

The widespread supply of different types of broadcasting software, including live-streaming applications, allowed individuals to easily broadcast, and this encouraged the popularity of the personal broadcasting among young generation willing to show their personal lives online for fun or fame. Personal broadcasting lets individuals be engaged in self-branding, turning the private into public.

As a new form of mobile self-expression, personal broadcasting has been popularized in China and in Republic of Korea in particular.

Despite the increasing number of personal broadcasting services, it lacks proper monitoring systems to look out for any illicit contents.
