= Park Ji-ah (actress, born 1977) =

South Korean actress (born 1977)

- Born: Park Ji-ah; 18 July 1977 (age 49); Seoul, South Korea
- Other name: Park Ji-a
- Education: Myongji College
- Occupation: Actress
- Years active: 1998–present
- Agent: Jannabi Entertainment
- Known for: Link: Eat, Love, Kill; Our Blues; Once Upon a Small Town

Korean name
- Hangul: 박지아
- RR: Bak Jia
- MR: Pak Chia

Park Ji-ah (Korean: 박지아; born 18 July 1977) is a South Korean actress. She is known for her roles in dramas such as Link: Eat, Love, Kill, Our Blues and Once Upon a Small Town.

== Early life ==
Park Ji-ah started her career in 1998 in theatre plays. She has performed in stage plays and musicals such as Blood and Seed, Daughters of Igalia, Elephant Song, Mokship, and Build Simcheongjeon.

== Career ==
In 2021, she signed with Jannabi Entertainment and worked in her first drama Beyond Evil. The following year she had a supporting role in drama Our Blues, portraying the role of Hye-ja, a woman who takes care of her autistic granddaughter. The role was very well-received. Park said that she learned the Jeju dialect used in the role of a local haenyeo, and that many asked her if she was from Jeju. Later, she played the role of Park Seon-hwa in Link: Eat, Love, Kill.

== Filmography ==
=== Television series ===
Year	Title	Role	Ref.
2021	Beyond Evil	Neighborhood woman	
2022	Our Blues	Park Hye-ja	
2022	Link: Eat, Love, Kill	Park Seon-hwa	
2022	Once Upon a Small Town	Cha Yeon-hong	
2022	The Law Cafe	Hair Stylist	
2023	The Good Bad Mother	Doctor	
2023	KBS Drama Special: "Half Lies"	Seok-ran	
2023	Delightfully Deceitful	Prisoner	
2024	Crash	Park Hyeon-jeong	
2024	A Virtuous Business	Butcher shop owner	
2024	The Trunk	Pawn Shop Owner	
2024	Brewing Love	Sim Young-ja	

=== Film ===
Year	Title	Role	Ref.
2024	It Has to Be a Secret	Ha-young	

== Theatre ==
Year	Title	Korean Title	Role
2006	Bandit	밴디트	Marie
2007	Dreamy	몽연	Masked person
2008	Oasis Laundry Heist Incident	오아시스세탁소습격사건	Jang Min-sook
2010	Thank You Honey	여보 고마워	Mother-in-law
2011	Miss Young Ae	막돼먹은 영애씨	Young-ae
2012	Miss Young-ae, Who Is Lost	막돼먹은 영애씨	Young-ae
2012	Propose	프로포즈	Jin-young
2013	Hyegyeonggung Hong	혜경궁 홍씨	Choi Sang-gung
2014	Pyongyang Maria	평양마리아	Grandma
2014	Frankenstein	프랑켄슈타인	Clarie
2015	With	이랑	Wol-jik Chasa
2015	Piece Of Paper	토막 土幕	Gyeongseon Cheo
2015	Winter Story	겨울이야기	Nobility
2015	Heavy Metal Girls	헤비메탈 걸스	Eun-ju
2015	I Have Soup	국물 있사옵니다	Park Yong-ja
2017	Doorbell	초인종	Mom
2017	You're Carrying Gwangju-ri, Again	조끼	Grandmother
2018	September	9월	Seon-hee
2018	Grandma - Suwon	할머니 - 수원	Grandma
2018	Completely Out Of The Blue	완전히 파란색	Lady Han
2018	A Magician's Story	어느 마술사 이야기	Mother
2019	Galileo's life	갈릴레오의 삶	Madame Sarti
2019	2nd Feminism	제2의 페미니즘	Morgan
2019	Daughters of Igalia	이갈리아의 딸들	Son
2019	Elephant Song	엘리펀트 송	Peterson
2021	76 Festival	76 축제	Gwi-duk

== Awards and nominations ==
Name of the award ceremony, year presented, category, nominee of the award, and the result of the nomination
Award ceremony	Year	Category	Nominee / Work	Result	Ref.
54th Dong-A Theater Awards	2017	Rookie of the Year Award	You're Carrying Gwangju-ri, Again	Won	
