= ENA (South Korean TV channel) =

South Korean television network

- Country: South Korea

Programming
- Picture format: 1080i HDTV

Ownership
- Owner: KT ENA (KT Corporation)
- Sister channels: ENA Play; ENA Drama; ENA Story; ENA Sports; OLIFE; ONCE; ViKi; CHING; Healthmedi; kidstalktalkplus; skyUHD (4K UHD)

History
- Launched: September 29, 2003; 23 years ago
- Former names: Sky HD (2003–2007); HD One (2007–2012); Channel N (2012–2014); Sky Drama (2014–2020); Sky (2020–2022)

Links
- Website: ktena.co.kr

ENA is a South Korean nationwide pay television network operated by KT ENA, a broadcasting subsidiary of KT SkyLife. ENA programming consists of television series and variety shows.

== History ==
Initially launched as SkyHD in September 2003 as part of Skylife's channel lineup, its name was changed to HDOne in September 2007 and the channel started broadcasting on other cable TV providers. The channel was renamed Channel N in July 2012, with programming focused on mainly foreign television series and movies. On August 1, 2014 its programming was changed to airing reruns of Korean dramas and its name changed first to Sky Drama, and then on March 16, 2020 to SKY. On April 29, 2022, SKY changed its channel name to ENA, which the channel made its availability outside Skylife such as their competitors B tv and U+TV.

KT Corporation announced the channel rebrand in April 2022 with the aim of transforming it into a top brand in Korean pay television. SkyTV CEO Yoon Yong-phil said that they would create over 30 new drama series and 300 entertainment shows over the next three years for ENA and channels operated by SkyTV.

== Programs ==
=== TV series ===
ENA's highest-rated TV series is Extraordinary Attorney Woo, which premiered with a nationwide viewership rating of 0.9%, and recorded 17.534% nationwide audience share on its final episode, making it seventh highest rated drama in Korean cable television history at the time. It received critical acclaim, and was nominated for Best Foreign Language Series at the 28th Critics' Choice Awards.

==== Sunday–Monday ====
- Evilive (October 14 – November 13, 2023)

==== Monday–Tuesday ====
- Summer Strike (November 21 – December 27, 2022)
- Pale Moon (April 10 – May 9, 2023)
- Oh! Youngsim (May 15 – June 13, 2023)
- Lies Hidden in My Garden (June 19 – July 11, 2023)
- Not Others (July 17 – August 22, 2023)
- New Recruit 2 (August 28 – September 12, 2023)
- Tell Me That You Love Me (November 27, 2023 – January 16, 2024)
- The Midnight Studio (March 11 – May 6, 2024)
- Crash (May 13 – June 18, 2024)
- Your Honor (August 12 – September 10, 2024)
- Dear Hyeri (September 23 – October 29, 2024)
- Brewing Love (November 4, 2024 – December 10, 2024)
- Namib (December 23, 2024 – January 28, 2025)
- Mother and Mom (March 3–25, 2025)
- Tastefully Yours (May 12 – June 10, 2025)
- Salon de Holmes (June 16 – July 15, 2025)
- The Defects (July 21 – August 12, 2025)
- My Troublesome Star (August 18 – September 23, 2025)
- Ms. Incognito (September 29 – November 4, 2025)
- Heroes Next Door (November 17 – December 16, 2025)
- I Dol I (December 22, 2025 – January 27, 2026)
- Honour (February 2 – March 10, 2026)
- Climax (March 16 – April 14, 2026)
- The Scarecrow (April 20 – May 26, 2026)
- Doctor on the Edge (June 1 – July 7, 2026)
- Dream to You (July 13 – August 18, 2026)
- New Recruit 4 (August 24 – September 29, 2026)
- Between Steps (October 5 – November 10, 2026)
- Crash 2 (November 16, 2026 – present)

==== Wednesday–Thursday ====
- Never Give Up (May 4 – June 23, 2022)
- Extraordinary Attorney Woo (June 29 – August 18, 2022)
- Good Job (August 24 – September 29, 2022)
- Love Is for Suckers (October 5 – December 1, 2022)
- Unlock My Boss (December 7, 2022 – January 12, 2023)
- Strangers Again (January 18 – February 22, 2023)
- Delivery Man (March 1 – April 6, 2023)
- True to Love (April 12 – May 25, 2023)
- Battle for Happiness (May 31 – July 20, 2023)
- Longing for You (July 26 – September 7, 2023)
- The Kidnapping Day (September 13 – October 25, 2023)
- Moon in the Day (November 1 – December 14, 2023)
- Like Flowers in Sand (December 20, 2023 – January 31, 2024)

==== Friday–Saturday ====
- New Recruit (July 23 – August 20, 2022)
- Gaus Electronics (September 30 – November 5, 2022)

=== Entertainment ===
==== Currently airing ====
- I Am Solo (나는 SOLO; 2021 – present)
- The Hammington's Dream Closet (2022 – present)
- I Am Solo: Love Continues (2022 – present)
- Suspicious Bookstore East West South Book (2022 – present)
- Country life of Gen-Z (2024 – present)
- K-Pop Up Chart Show (2024 – present)
- Korea's Next Wave (2026; yearly)

==== Past shows ====
- Thrill King (2019)
- Doomed Marriage (2020) co-produced and aired alongside Channel A
- Soo Mi's Mountain Cabin (2021) co-produced and aired alongside KBS 2TV
- Divorced Singles (돌싱글즈; 2021) co-produced and aired alongside MBN
- Steel Troops (2021–2022) co-produced and aired alongside Channel A
- Not Hocance But Scance (2022) co-produced and aired alongside MBN
- Queen of Wrestling (2022) co-produced and aired alongside tvN STORY
- King of Wrestling (2022) co-produced and aired alongside tvN STORY
- Campground for Learning (2022)
- Whiteout (2023)
- HMLYCP (2023)

== Viewership ratings ==
The following dramas air on ENA with the highest average audience share ratings (nationwide).

Top 10 series per nationwide household rating
#	Series	Nationwide household rating (Nielsen)	Final episode date	Ref.
1	Extraordinary Attorney Woo	17.534%	August 18, 2022	
2	The Scarecrow	8.122%	May 26, 2026	
3	Ms. Incognito	7.127%	November 4, 2025	
4	Crash	6.619%	June 18, 2024	
5	Your Honor	6.053%	September 10, 2024	
6	Doctor on the Edge	5.932%	July 7, 2026	
7	Not Others	5.532%	August 22, 2023	
8	The Kidnapping Day	5.245%	October 25, 2023	
9	New Recruit Season 4: Sabotage	5.188%	September 29, 2026	
10	Heroes Next Door	4.960%	December 16, 2025	
