= Genie TV =

South Korean television network

Genie TV (Korean: 지니 TV; formerly Olleh TV) is an IPTV service provided by South Korea's main telecom operator KT. It broadcasts VOD including TV programs, movies, children's programs, sports, documentaries and animations.

On 4 October 2022, KT rebranded its IPTV service as Genie TV, 11 years after the Olleh TV brand was introduced. The rebranding is part of the telecom's aggressive effort to push forward its content business as growth in the traditional telecom sector slows.

== Olleh TV for PlayStation 3 ==
Since November 20, 2007, following a partnership between KT and Sony Computer Entertainment, Olleh TV is made available for PlayStation 3 owners in South Korea. Once the PlayStation 3's firmware version 2.10 installed in the system, a new icon, called "TV", appears in the XMB. The user is asked to agree a terms of service form then to download the 13MB Olleh TV player. Olleh TV is also a provider of Spanish television programming. Olleh TV signed a deal with HDTV Inc. to bring three new markets into the Spanish broadcasting circuit.
