= The Scarecrow (TV series) =

2026 South Korean television series

- Promotional poster
- Hangul: 허수아비
- RR: Heosuabi
- MR: Hŏsuabi
- Genre: Mystery; Thriller
- Written by: Lee Ji-hyun
- Directed by: Park Joon-woo
- Starring: Park Hae-soo; Lee Hee-joon; Kwak Sun-young
- Music by: Kim Sung-youl
- Opening theme: Scarecrow by Kim Sung-youl
- Country of origin: South Korea
- Original language: Korean
- No. of episodes: 12

Production
- Executive producers: Choi Kyung-joo; Park Joon-woo; Yoo Jung-hoon; Kim Hyun-chul; Woo Ram
- Producers: Kwon Hyo-min; Jung Da-sol
- Cinematography: Hong Il-seop; Han Sang-wook; Lee Jeung-bok
- Editor: Na Hee-soo
- Running time: 60 minutes
- Production companies: Studio Anseillen; It's Story!; Merrychristmas

Original release
- Network: ENA; Genie TV
- Release: April 20 – May 26, 2026

The Scarecrow (Korean: 허수아비) is a 2026 South Korean mystery thriller television series written by Lee Ji-hyun, directed by Park Joon-woo, and starring Park Hae-soo, Lee Hee-joon, and Kwak Sun-young. The series follows a detective investigating a serial murder case with a former rival by his side, to uncover the true culprit. It aired on ENA from April 20 to May 26, 2026, every Monday and Tuesday at 22:00 (KST). It is also available for streaming on Genie TV and TVING in South Korea and Viu and Rakuten Viki in selected regions.

== Synopsis ==
Kang Tae-joo, a former ace detective demoted to his hometown of Gangseong, refuses to compromise with injustice. He sees the Gangseong serial murder case as an opportunity to restore his reputation, but clashes with prosecutor Cha Si-young, a bully from his school days. As they investigate, Tae-joo's character undergoes a transformation, and he encounters unexpected twists and turns in the case. The events of the show are heavily inspired by the Hwaseong serial murders.

== Cast ==
=== Main ===
- Park Hae-soo as Kang Tae-joo
  - Choi Hyun-jin as teen Tae-joo

A former homicide detective who currently works as a profiler teaching criminology at a university.

- Lee Hee-joon as Cha Si-young
  - Moon Woo-jin as teen Si-young

A prosecutor who led the investigation into the serial murder case.

- Kwak Sun-young as Seo Ji-won

Tae-joo's close high school friend and a reporter for Kangseong Daily.

=== Supporting ===
- Song Geon-hee as Lee Ki-beom / Cha Young-beom
1. Lee Ki-beom: Ki-hwan's younger brother and Sun-young's boyfriend.
2. Cha Young-beom: Ki-beom and Sun-young's son who is an intern at Noise Cut.
- Seo Ji-hye as Kang Sun-young

An elementary school teacher who is Tae-joo's younger sister and Ki-beom's girlfriend.

- Jung Moon-sung as Lee Ki-hwan

The owner of Kangseong Bookstore who is Tae-joo and Ji-won's childhood friend, and Ki-beom's older brother.

- Ryu Hae-jun as Park Dae-ho

A rookie detective at Kangseong Police Station. He assists Tae-joo on investigations and works alongside his senior officers.

- Hur Jung-do as Cha Joon-young

Si-young's half-brother and a high-ranking police official who later gets appointed as the chief of the Kangseong Police Station.

- Baek Hyun-jin as Kim Man-chun

Team Leader at Kangseong Police Station

- Jeon Jae-hong as Jang Myung-do

A corrupt detective at Kangseong Police Station who is in cahoots with Si-young.

- Kim Eun-woo as Do Hyung-gu

A corrupt detective at Kangseong Police Station who is in cahoots with Si-young.

- Baek Seung-hwan as Im Seok-man

Ki-beom's friend who is cripple.

- Sung Yeo-jin as Ki-beom's mother
- Lim Yun-bi as Jeong-sook

Ki-Hwan's wife.

- Kil Eun-sung as Park Sang-beom
  - Kim Joon-hee as teen Sang-beom

The owner of Modoka's Bar and a gangster.

- Lee Ji-hye as Lee Sook-hee

A policewoman at Kangseong Police Station.

- Hong Bi-ra as Kim Hee-jin

Si-young's fiancé and Chairman Kim's daughter.

- Lee Suk-hyeong as Un-hui

A cameraman at Kangseong Daily and Ji-won's assistant.

- Park Sang-hoon as Lee Sung-jin

A former offender with a criminal record for stealing stockings.

- Kim Hwan-hee as Kim Min-ji

A high school student who is Jeong-rin's friend and the sixth victim of the serial murder case.

- Kong A-reum as Yu Jeong-rin

A high school student who is Min-ji's friend and the fourth victim of the serial murder case.

- Moon Kyung-cho as Park Kyeong-sik

Ki-beom's friend who got married.

- Yoo Seung-mok as Cha Mu-jin

Si-young's father, a powerful politician and former military general who has long held significant influence in Kangseong.

- Kang Jeong-woo as Jeon Kyung-ho

An elementary school teacher and the nephew of Kangseong Governor.

- Hwang Eun-hoo as Park Ae-sook

A survivor of the serial murder case.

- Kim Gye-rim as Kim Mi-yeon

A survivor of the serial murder case.

- Park Sung-hoon as Hwang Jae-hoo

A prosecutor.

=== Special appearances ===
- Do Ji-won as adult Cha Sun-young
- Park Won-sang as adult Park Dae-ho
- Jeon Seok-chan as adult Im Seok-man
- Cha Ji-yeon as adult Kim Hee-jin
- Lee Min-ki as Cha Yeon-ho

== Production ==
=== Development ===
Produced under Studio Anseillen, Park Joon-woo, known for his work on Taxi Driver (2021) and Crash (2024), was attached to direct the series and reunites with screenwriter Lee Ji-hyun, with whom he previously collaborated on Taxi Driver. It is based on the Lee Choon-jae serial murders.

=== Casting ===
In May 2025, Park Hae-soo, Lee Hee-joon, and Kwak Sun-young were reportedly cast. The next month, Seo Ji-hye joined the cast. Four months later, Song Geon-hee was cast, and filming was in its final stage. By September 2025, Park, Lee, and Kwak were confirmed to lead the series.

=== Original soundtrack ===
==== Album ====
The Scarecrow (Original Soundtrack)

Soundtrack album
- Released: May 26, 2026
- Genre: Soundtrack
- Length: 60:26
- Language: Korean
- Labels: Magic Strawberry Sound, KT Genie Music

No.	Title	Artist	Length
1.	"Tonight" (오늘밤)	Soyou	3:53
2.	"Tonight" (Instrumental)		3:53
3.	"The Forgotten" (잊혀지는 것)	Park Hae-soo	4:26
4.	"The Forgotten" (Instrumental)		4:26
5.	"The Forgotten" (잊혀지는 것)	Kwak Sun-young	4:14
6.	"The Forgotten" (Instrumental)		4:14
7.	"SCARECROW"	Kim Sung-youl	1:40
8.	"Mist of Gangseong" (강성의 안개)	Kim Sung-youl	2:08
9.	"Noose in the Field" (들판의 올가미)	Kim Sung-youl	3:13
10.	"Straw Detectives" (지푸라기 수사대)	Yoo Jong-hyun	2:08
11.	"Sunlight Through Dusty Windows" (먼지 낀 창틈의 햇살)	Yoo Jong-hyun	3:06
12.	"Two Shadows" (두 개의 그림자)	Kim Sung-youl	2:12
13.	"Prosecutor and Detective" (검사와 형사)	Kim Sung-youl	2:11
14.	"Night of Decaying Limbs" (사지가 썩는 밤)	Yoo Jong-hyun	2:51
15.	"Stuffed Justice" (박제된 정의)	Kim Sung-youl	2:10
16.	"Afterimage of 31 Years" (31년의 잔상)	Kim Sung-youl	2:23
17.	"Frozen 1988" (멈춰버린 1988)	Kim Sung-youl	2:41
18.	"Dance of the Scarecrow" (허수아비의 춤)	Yoo Jong-hyun	2:24
19.	"The Truth Hidden in the Night" (밤이 삼킨 진실)	Byun Dong-wook	3:08
20.	"Human Warmth" (사람의 온기)	Yoo Jong-hyun	2:32
21.	"Solidarity of Hatred" (혐오의 연대)	Kim Sung-youl	1:58
22.	"False Confession" (거짓 자백)	Kim Sung-youl	4:09
23.	"Codename Scarecrow" (코드 네임 '허수아비')	Kim Sung-youl	2:24
24.	"Tae-ju's Drunken Rant" (태주의 술주정)	Byun Dong-wook	2:01
25.	"Cold Interrogation Room" (차가운 취조실)	Yoo Jong-hyun	2:55
26.	"Waves of Sorrow" (밀려오는 슬픔)	Byun Dong-wook	2:15
27.	"Shadow Hunting" (그림자 사냥)	Yoo Jong-hyun	2:18
28.	"The Blind Spot of Law" (법의 사각지대)	Jo Ham-wook	3:32
29.	"The Nameless Grave" (이름 없는 무덤)	Yoo Jong-hyun	2:09
30.	"Fake Confession" (가짜의 고백)	Yoo Jong-hyun	2:23
Total length:			60:26

==== Singles ====
Original Soundtrack (Part 1–3)

Part 1

No.	Title	Artist	Length
1.	"Tonight" (오늘밤)	Soyou	3:53
2.	"Tonight" (Inst.)		3:53
Total length:			7:46

Part 2

No.	Title	Artist	Length
1.	"The Forgotten" (잊혀지는 것)	Park Hae-soo	4:26
2.	"The Forgotten" (Inst.)		4:26
Total length:			8:52

Part 3

No.	Title	Artist	Length
1.	"The Forgotten" (잊혀지는 것)	Kwak Sun-young	4:14
2.	"The Forgotten" (Inst.)		4:14
Total length:			8:28

== Release ==
The Scarecrow was reportedly scheduled to premiere on ENA in the first half of 2026, and would also be subsequently streaming on Genie TV. By March 2026, the premiere was confirmed to be on April 20, and would air every Monday and Tuesday at 22:00 (KST).

== Viewership ==
The Scarecrow : South Korea viewers per episode (millions)

Season	Episode number												Average
Season	1	2	3	4	5	6	7	8	9	10	11	12	Average
1	0.654	0.951	1.239	1.251	1.537	1.826	1.604	1.857	1.746	1.938	1.823	1.995	1.535

Source: Audience measurement performed nationwide by Nielsen Korea.

Average TV viewership ratings
Ep.	Original broadcast date	Average audience share (Nielsen Korea)	
Ep.	Original broadcast date	Nationwide	Seoul
1	April 20, 2026	2.903% (1st)	2.712% (1st)
2	April 21, 2026	4.092% (1st)	4.207% (1st)
3	April 27, 2026	4.975% (1st)	4.834% (1st)
4	April 28, 2026	5.243% (1st)	5.472% (1st)
5	May 4, 2026	6.301% (1st)	5.994% (1st)
6	May 5, 2026	7.410% (1st)	7.650% (1st)
7	May 11, 2026	6.455% (1st)	6.136% (2nd)
8	May 12, 2026	7.444% (1st)	7.291% (1st)
9	May 18, 2026	7.217% (1st)	7.182% (1st)
10	May 19, 2026	7.925% (1st)	7.810% (2nd)
11	May 25, 2026	7.352% (2nd)	7.226% (2nd)
12	May 26, 2026	8.122% (1st)	8.311% (1st)
Average		6.287%	6.235%
In the table above, the blue numbers represent the lowest ratings and the red numbers represent the highest ratings.; This drama aired on a cable channel/pay TV which normally has a relatively smaller audience compared to free-to-air TV/public broadcasters (KBS, SBS, MBC, and EBS).

== Awards and nominations ==
Award ceremony	Year	Category	Nominee	Result	Ref.
Blue Dragon Series Awards	2026	Best Drama	The Scarecrow	Nominated	
Blue Dragon Series Awards	2026	Best Actor	Park Hae-soo	Won	
Blue Dragon Series Awards	2026	Best Supporting Actor	Jung Moon-sung	Nominated	
Blue Dragon Series Awards	2026	Best Supporting Actress	Kwak Sun-young	Nominated	
Blue Dragon Series Awards	2026	Best New Actor	Song Geon-hee	Nominated	
Blue Dragon Series Awards	2026	Best New Actress	Seo Ji-hye	Nominated	
Korea Drama Awards	2026	Grand Prize	Park Hae-soo	Won	
Korea Drama Awards	2026	Top Excellence Award, Actor	Lee Hee-jun	Won	
Korea Drama Awards	2026	Excellence Award, Actress	Kwak Sun-young	Won	
