= Seo Ji-hye (actress) =

South Korean actress (born 1996)

- Born: July 17, 1996 (age 30); Seoul, South Korea
- Other name: Jihye
- Education: Ewha Womans University (Department of Computer Engineering)
- Occupations: Actress; model
- Years active: 2017–present
- Agent: 51K
- Known for: Family by Choice; Gangnam Beauty; Love All Play; My Perfect Stranger

Korean name
- Hangul: 서지혜
- RR: Seo Jihye
- MR: Sŏ Chihye

Seo Ji-hye (Korean: 서지혜; born July 17, 1996) is a South Korean actress and model. She is known for her roles in dramas such as Family by choice, Gangnam Beauty, Instant Romance, Welcome 2 Life, Crime Puzzle, Love All Play, and My Perfect Stranger.

== Career ==
In 2017, while studying Computer Engineering at Ewha Womans University, Seo appeared on Channel A's dating reality show Heart Signal, where she gained recognition.

In 2020, Seo signs exclusive contract with Just Entertainment and begin an acting career.

On February 20, 2026, Seo signed an exclusive contract with 51K.

== Filmography ==
=== Television series ===
Year	Title	Role	Ref.
2018	Gangnam Beauty	Noh Min-a	
2019	Welcome 2 Life	Noh Young-mi (Cameo)	
2020	Mystic Pop-up Bar	Han Kang Bae's dream girlfriend (Cameo)	
2021	Love All Play	Lee Yoo-mi	
2022	Crime Puzzle	Park Soo-bin	
2023	My Perfect Stranger	Lee Soon-ae (in 1987)	
2024	Family by Choice	Park Dal	
2026	The Scarecrow	Kang Sun-young	
2026	Agent Kim Reactivated	Lim Yu-jin	

=== Web series ===
Year	Title	Role	Ref.
2018	Doo Teob's Pretty Easy School Life	Kim Tae-hee	
2018	Instant Romance	Go Ma-ri	
2019	Like	Park Se-yeon	

=== Film ===
Year	Title	Role	Ref.
2023	The Wild	Choi Myung-joo	

=== Music video appearances ===
Year	Title	Artist	Length	Ref.
2018	I Miss You	Leeds	4:05	
2019	Shall We Begin	Rain	4:00	

=== Television shows ===
Year	Title	Original title	Role	Notes	Ref.
2017	Heart Signal	하트시그널	Herself	Season 1	
2017	Heart Signal Special	하트시그널	Herself	Cast member	

== Awards and nominations ==
Name of the award ceremony, year presented, category, nominee of the award, and the result of the nomination
Award ceremony	Year	Category	Nominee / Work	Result	Ref.
KBS Drama Awards	2023	Best New Actress	My Perfect Stranger	Won	
Blue Dragon Series Awards	2026	Best New Actress	The Scarecrow	Nominated	
