= Brain Works =

2023 South Korean television series

- Promotional poster
- Hangul: 두뇌공조
- Hanja: 頭腦共助
- Lit.: Brain Cooperation
- RR: Dunoegongjo
- MR: Tunoegongjo
- Genre: Comedy; Mystery
- Written by: Park Kyung-seon
- Directed by: Lee Jin-seo; Gu Seong-jun
- Starring: Jung Yong-hwa; Cha Tae-hyun; Kwak Sun-young; Ye Ji-won
- Music by: Park Se-joon
- Country of origin: South Korea
- Original language: Korean
- No. of episodes: 16

Production
- Executive producer: Park Ki-ho (KBS)
- Producers: Ahn Je-hyeon; Shin Sang-yoon; Lee Seung-bum
- Running time: 75 minutes
- Production company: Samhwa Networks
- Budget: ₩6.4 billion

Original release
- Network: KBS2
- Release: January 2 – February 28, 2023

Brain Works (Korean: 두뇌공조) is a 2023 South Korean television series starring Jung Yong-hwa, Cha Tae-hyun, Kwak Sun-young, and Ye Ji-won. It aired on KBS2 from January 2 to February 28, 2023, every Monday and Tuesday at 21:50 (KST) for 16 episodes.

== Synopsis ==
Brain Works is a science-themed comedic investigative drama that follows the story of two men, who cannot stand each other, as they partner up to solve a criminal case involving a rare brain disease.

== Cast ==
=== Main ===
- Jung Yong-hwa as Shin Ha-ru, a neuroscientist who has an "extraordinary brain"
  - Seo Woo-jin as young Shin Ha-ru
- Cha Tae-hyun as Geum Myung-se, a detective who has an "altruistic brain"
- Kwak Sun-young as Seol So-jung, a forensic hypnosis investigator who has an "anxious brain"
- Ye Ji-won as Kim Mo-ran, Myung-se's ex-wife who has a "sexual brain"

=== Supporting ===
==== People around Ha-ru ====
- Jung Dong-hwan as Hwang Dong-woo, a murderer and a death row inmate who has a "psychopath brain"
- Kim Soo-jin as Shin Ji-hyung, a neurosurgeon at Korea University Hospital who has a "middle-aged brain"
- Lim Chul-hyung as Park Chi-guk, head of the Brain Hub Center, a brain science research institute affiliated with Korea University Hospital, who has a "political brain"

==== People around Myung-se ====
- Woo Hyun as Kim Gil-joong, chief of the neuroscience team at the Seobu Police Station who has a "menopausal brain"
- Kim Ah-song as Geum I-na, Myung-se's daughter who has a "teenage brain"

=== Extended ===
- Kim Kang-il as Kang Seong-ha, a murderer
- Park Sang-hoon as Ho-young
- Han Ji-wan as Han Yeon-hee
- Lee Won-jung as Kim Joon-young
- Oh Yoon-hong

=== Special appearances ===
- Jang Ho-il as Kim Jae-won
- Moon Won-joo as O Sang-gi
- Han Soo-yeon as Jung In-young
- Jang Dong-seon
- Jung Jin-young as Park Jin-young
- Lee Sang-sook as Lee Jeong-ja
- Lee Seung-joon as Heo Bum-soo
- Jeon Ik-ryeong as Kim Jae-suk
- Im Do-hwa as a virtual human
- Ha Si-eun

== Production ==
It was reported that filming for the series was scheduled to start in July 2022.

== Viewership ==
Brain Works : South Korea viewers per episode (thousands)

Season	Episode number															
Season	1	2	3	4	5	6	7	8	9	10	11	12	13	14	15	16
1	911	712	N/A	N/A	700	686	671	596	660	605	N/A	530	757	662	676	763

Source: Audience measurement performed nationwide by Nielsen Korea.

Average TV viewership ratings
Ep.	Original broadcast date	Average audience share		
Ep.	Original broadcast date	Nielsen Korea		TNmS
Ep.	Original broadcast date	Nationwide	Seoul	Nationwide
1	January 2, 2023	5.2% (14th)	4.3% (18th)	4.4% (18th)
2	January 3, 2023	4.1% (17th)	3.8% (19th)	N/A
3	January 9, 2023	3.9% (20th)	3.7% (18th)	N/A
4	January 10, 2023	3.3% (21st)	N/A	N/A
5	January 16, 2023	4.3% (18th)	4.2% (18th)	N/A
6	January 17, 2023	4.4% (16th)	4.6% (13th)	3.4% (20th)
7	January 30, 2023	4.0% (19th)	3.7% (18th)	N/A
8	January 31, 2023	3.3% (20th)	N/A	N/A
9	February 6, 2023	3.9% (17th)	3.8% (17th)	N/A
10	February 7, 2023	3.7% (17th)	3.8% (16th)	3.5% (20th)
11	February 13, 2023	3.7% (19th)	3.3% (19th)	3.8% (18th)
12	February 14, 2023	3.4% (18th)	3.6% (18th)	N/A
13	February 20, 2023	4.3% (16th)	4.3% (15th)	N/A
14	February 21, 2023	4.0% (17th)	4.2% (14th)	4.0% (15th)
15	February 27, 2023	4.2% (16th)	4.2% (16th)	3.4% (20th)
16	February 28, 2023	4.9% (8th)	5.1% (7th)	N/A
Average		4.0%	— (Note: Due to some unpublished ratings, the exact average rating is unknown.)	—
In the table above, the blue numbers represent the lowest published ratings and the red numbers represent the highest published ratings.; N/A denotes ratings that were not published.
