= Yaksha: Ruthless Operations =

South Korean spy action Netflix film

- Promotional poster
- Hangul: 야차
- Hanja: 夜叉
- RR: Yacha
- MR: Yach'a
- Directed by: Na Hyeon
- Screenplay by: Na Hyeon; Ahn Sang-hoon
- Produced by: Ok Kwang-hee
- Starring: Sul Kyung-gu; Park Hae-soo; Yang Dong-geun; Lee El; Song Jae-rim; Park Jin-young
- Cinematography: Hong Jae-sik
- Edited by: Kim Sang-bum
- Music by: Lee Jung-oh
- Production companies: Showbox; Sangsang Films
- Distributed by: Netflix
- Release date: April 8, 2022
- Running time: 125 minutes
- Country: South Korea
- Languages: Korean; Chinese; Japanese

Yaksha: Ruthless Operations (Korean: 야차; RR: Yacha) is a 2022 South Korean spy action film directed by Na Hyeon. The film stars Sul Kyung-gu and Park Hae-soo. Based in Shenyang, China, the film revolves around a leader of an espionage agency's black ops team, and a prosecutor who was demoted to the espionage agency. The film was released worldwide on April 8, 2022 on Netflix.

== Plot ==
After a botched attempt to prosecute Lee Chan-young, chairman of Sangin Group, Han Ji-hoon, a prosecutor from the Seoul Central District Prosecutors' Office, is demoted to the legal support office of the NIS. Ji-hoon eagerly takes up an assignment declined by his superior and is sent by Director Yeom to inspect the NIS Shenyang branch, a highly classified black ops base involved with North Korean counter-intelligence.

The Black Team is led by Ji Kang-in and fronted as Samjin Travel Agency. After upsetting Kang-in by intervening in an operation, Kang-in has Ji-hoon framed for prostitution and using illegal drugs to test his skills at improvising a response. Ji-hoon climbs out the hotel window where the drugs were planted to flee police, thus passing the test, and he officially joins the team at its secret base.

Kang-in briefs Ji-hoon on the mission to extract Moon Byung-uk, the head of Room 39, part of the North Korean Central Committee involved in maintaining the Kim family's slush funds. Moon intends to defect South Korea, but the extraction fails when he is pursued by various parties who want the information he holds. The team manages to secure Moon's adult daughter Ju-yeon. When they intend to torture her for information on her father, Ji-hoon allows her to escape. The Black Team tracks Ju-yeon to Moon's safe house, only to find they have been set up by Yoshinobu Ozawa for the murder of Moon and kidnapping of Ju-yeon.

With Chinese authorities on their heels, the Black Team cleans out the travel agency and destroy their secret base. The team refuses to leave Shenyang and regroups to extricate Ju-yeon from the Japanese consulate. Ji-hoon escapes with Ju-yeon, who reveals the information held by her father and where it is stored. Threatened by Ozawa with his family's lives, Ji-hoon works with the Black Team to deceive the former that Kang-in is dead. Kang-in prevents Ju-yeon from deleting the list under Ozawa's threat. Ozawa, duped into attempting to delete the list, instead inadvertently triggers a program that disseminates the information, exposing all of Ozawa's double agents. Ozawa dies and Director Yeom gets arrested. Ji-hoon returns to the Seoul Central District Prosecutors' Office and successfully prosecutes the Sangin Group chairman.

In the epilogue, Kang-in contacts Ji-hoon to join the Black Team members, who have settled around the world, to gather in London for an unknown dangerous mission.

== Cast ==
=== Main ===
- Sul Kyung-gu as Ji Kang-in, head of the Shenyang branch of the NIS and nicknamed "Yaksha". Willing to go to any means, including breaking the law, to achieve the branch's missions.
- Park Hae-soo as Han Ji-hoon, a prosecutor from the Seoul Central District Prosecutors' Office and inspector to the NIS Shenyang Branch. In contrast to Kang-in, he believes justice should be upheld through law. At the end of the film, he returns to the Prosecutors' Office with a new perspective on justice.

=== Supporting ===
==== Samjin Travel Agency, the front business for the NIS Shenyang Branch (Black Team) ====
- Yang Dong-geun as Section Chief Hong, a mole of the Black Team later revealed to be working for Director Yeom.
- Lee El as Hee-won, a veteran senior agent of the Black Team.
- Song Jae-rim as Jae-gyu, an agent of the Black Team.
- Park Jin-young as Jeong-dae, the youngest member of the Black Team.

==== Headquarters of National Intelligence Agency (NIS) ====
- Jin Kyung as Yeom Jeong-won, a corrupt Director of the 4th Bureau in charge of NIS foreign intelligence activities. Suspicious of the Black Team's activities, she sends Ji-hoon to Shenyang. Later revealed to be working for Ozawa Yoshinobu and had successfully turned NIS agents into moles. The Black Team ambushes her and hands her over to Ji-hoon at the end of the series.

==== Room 39 ====
- Nam Kyung-eup as Moon Byung-uk, head of Room 39 a group part of the North Korean Central Committee involved in maintaining the Kim family's slush funds. He is pursued by various parties who wants the information he holds and for intending to defect to South Korea through the Black Team. He pleads Kang-in to protect his daughter before dying.
- Lee Soo-kyung as Moon Ju-yeon, daughter of Moon Byung-uk who has information that all parties are pursuing. Revealed that her father was deceived to work for the Japanese and wishes to make public a list of double agents managed by Ozawa Yoshinobu. Made a member of the Black Team in the ending credits.

==== North Korean Intelligence ====
- Jin Seo-yeon as Ryun-hee, an intelligence officer of the North Korean Security Agency which operates a North Korean restaurant in Shenyang. Exchanges intel with the Black Team and in a relationship with Kang-in.
- Kim Jong-man as Hak-cheol

==== Others ====
- Hiroyuki Ikeuchi as Ozawa Yoshinobu, a Japanese spy disguised as a former Japanese intelligence officer and lobbyist. He sets up the Black Team for the murder of Moon Byung-uk.
- Kim Seung-hoon as Department Head Hwang of the Seoul Central District Prosecutors' Office.
- Ha Jung-min, Kim Han-joon, and Lee Jin-seung as Prosecutors working in the same team as Han Ji-hoon in the Sangin Group case.
- Choi Won-young as Lee Chan-young, Chairman of Sangin Group. Besides stock manipulation and bribery, it is later revealed that Sangin is also involved in financing payments for Japanese spies.
- Yang Mal-bok as Ji-hoon's mother and owner of a restaurant near Suwon City Hall.
- Ji Yi-soo as Hye-jin, Ji-hoon's sister and owner of a restaurant near Suwon City Hall.
- Lee Ji-hoon as the prosecutor who sent Han Ji-hoon to Shenyang.
- Eleven Yao as Eleven, a crimelord based in Shenyang.

== Production ==
Sul Kyung-gu and Park Hae-soo were confirmed to cast in the film in December 2019. The cast line up was confirmed on December 31. Script reading was held on December 17 and principal photography began on December 31, 2019. Filming was wrapped up in the first half of 2020.

== Release ==
Since the film couldn't be released in theaters due to the COVID-19 pandemic, it was released on over-the-top streaming platform Netflix on April 8, 2022.

== Reception ==
=== Audience response ===
In the week from April 4 to April 10, Yaksha: Ruthless Operations was at 3rd place in the Global Top 10 weekly list of the most-watched Netflix films (Non-English) with 12.54 million viewing hours. It topped the most streamed movie list in the Asian region.

=== Critical response ===
The review aggregator website Rotten Tomatoes reported a 67% approval rating, based on 6 reviews with an average rating of 6/10.

Kim Bo-ram reviewing for Yonhap News wrote that the film is a "pulsating spy thriller set in precarious political landscape in Northeast Asia". Kim praised the performance of actor Sul Kyung-gu, stating that he "well portrays Kang-in", and "his performance creates an unexpected on-screen chemistry with Park Hae-soo". Kim opined that, unlike other spy films, this "action-packed thriller takes a different approach, revolving around a non-professional agent drawn into the dangerous and relentless intelligence operation." She appreciated "its action set-pieces", and stated that "gun shootouts are one of the outstanding parts of the film."

Johnny Loftus of Decider, recommending to stream the film, wrote, "Yaksha: Ruthless Operations brings a heap of trigger-happy spycraft to its tale of secrets and lies and two-faced promises on the way to sorting out some hard-earned justice." Loftus stated that the film "hums with ease through... tightly-edited action sequences" and noted that visually, it "benefits from palette, with neon reds bleeding in from every corner of the frame", showing the "gleaming, teeming Shenyang cityscape."

James Marsh of the South China Morning Post rated the film with 2 out of 5 stars and wrote, "Sluggish, predictable and almost wilfully devoid of thrills, South Korean action drama Yaksha: Ruthless Operations offers none of the unpredictable or mischievous antics teased by its curious title." Marsh concluded "[it] is a blandly functional thriller, executed with workmanlike competence, that woefully lacks any discernible glamour, intelligence or style."
