= Park Hae-soo =

South Korean actor (born 1981)

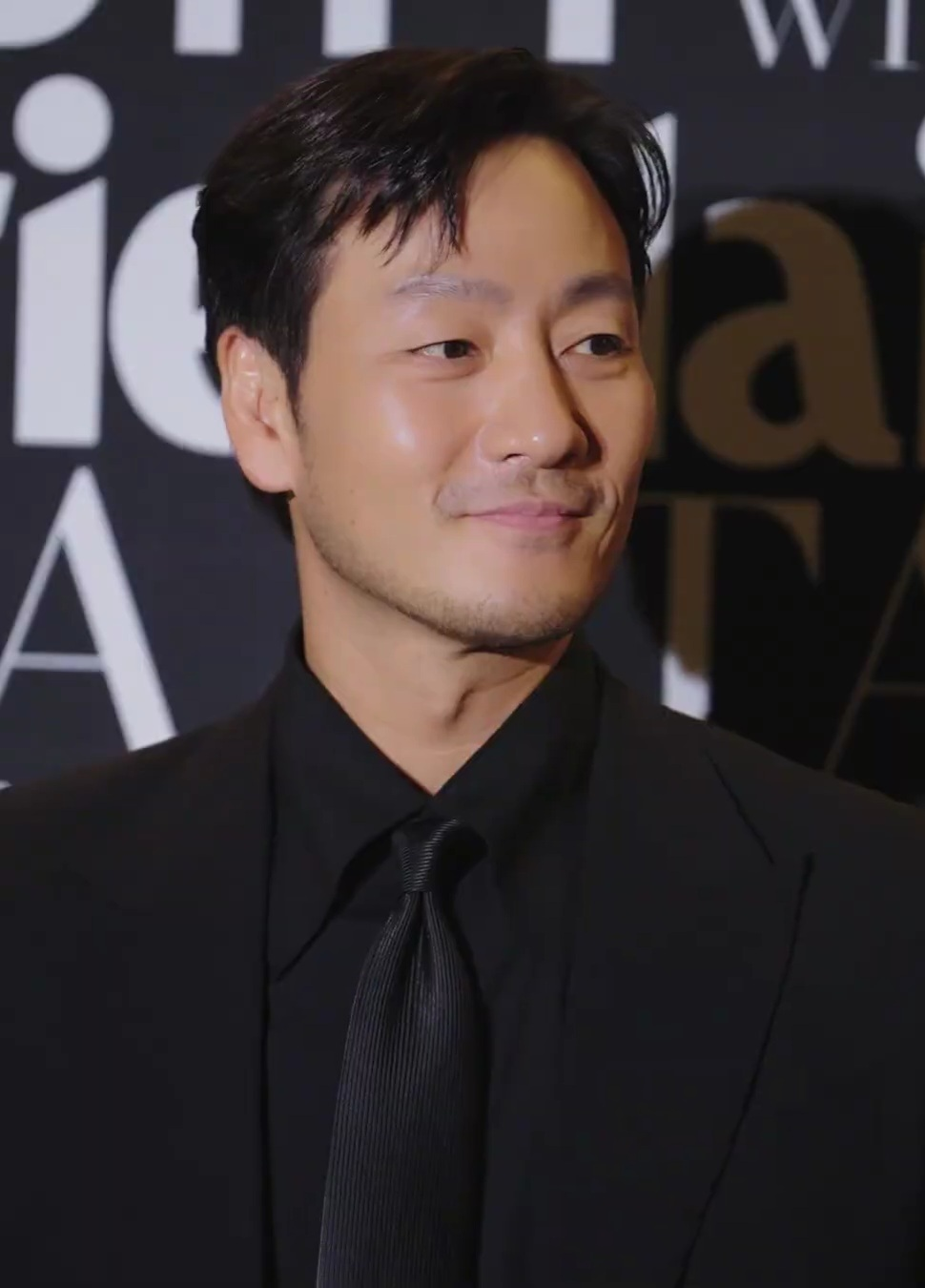
- Park in 2022
- Born: November 21, 1981 (age 44); Suwon, South Korea
- Education: Dankook University (Theater and Film)
- Occupation: Actor
- Years active: 2007–present
- Agents: BH Entertainment; United Talent Agency
- Spouse: Unknown (m. 2019)
- Children: 2

Korean name
- Hangul: 박해수
- RR: Bak Haesu
- MR: Pak Haesu
- Website: bhent.co.kr

Park Hae-soo (Korean: 박해수; born November 21, 1981) is a South Korean actor. He is best known worldwide for portraying Cho Sang-woo in the first season of the Netflix series Squid Game (2021), which earned him a nomination for the Primetime Emmy Award for Outstanding Supporting Actor in a Drama Series.

Park began his career in theater and has played a large number of leading and supporting roles in plays and musicals. He subsequently expanded his career into film and television and achieved his breakthrough with Prison Playbook (2017–2018), one of the highest-rated Korean dramas on cable television. He is also known for his frequent collaborations with Netflix, including Narco-Saints (2022), Money Heist: Korea – Joint Economic Area (2022), Karma (2025), The Price of Confession (2025), and The Great Flood (2025).

== Early life ==
Park was born in Suwon, South Korea, on November 21, 1981. He got his first taste of acting when he joined the theater club at Bundang Jungang High School. In 2000, he enrolled in the Department of Theater and Film at Dankook University, aspiring to become a theater actor. His father strongly disapproved of his chosen profession. While studying, Park also worked part-time jobs at sushi and barbecue restaurants and at concert venues.

After graduating with a Bachelor of Arts, Park enlisted for mandatory military service. He served in the 50th Infantry Division and worked as a teaching assistant in a recruit training center.

== Career ==
=== 2007–2020: Beginnings and breakthrough ===
Park started out primarily as a stage actor and has been active in both plays and musicals since his debut in 2007. In 2012, director Kim Jin-min saw a poster of Park for the musical Samcheon – Flower of Ruin and offered him a role in the television series God of War, which became Park's on-screen debut. Over the next few years, he continued to play minor and supporting roles in film and television. In March 2016, after gaining attention with his supporting role in the historical drama Six Flying Dragons, Park signed with BH Entertainment.

In 2017, Park made a breakthrough in his career when he landed the lead role in the drama series Prison Playbook after director Shin Won-ho saw his performance in the play Male Impulse. The series was a hit and brought Park widespread recognition.

In April 2019, Park appeared opposite IU in the anthology series Persona. In November 2019, he won the Blue Dragon Film Award for Best New Actor for his performance in the film By Quantum Physics: A Nightlife Venture. At the time, he was the oldest recipient of the award at the age of 38.

In February 2020, Park appeared in the dystopian thriller Time to Hunt, which premiered at the 70th Berlin International Film Festival, becoming the first South Korean film to be selected for the Berlinale Special Gala. Director Yoon Sung-hyun cast him in the film after watching the play Male Impulse in 2017. Due to the COVID-19 pandemic, the film was released worldwide on Netflix in April 2020.

In November 2020, Park appeared in prima ballerina Kim Joo-won's stage production Sagunja – Seasons of Change, which combined acting and dancing. Back in 2014, Kim saw Park practicing for the Korean production of Nick Dear's Frankenstein and had expressed a wish to work with him in the future. In preparation for Sagunja, he took ballet and modern dance classes for three months. Prior to that, he studied dance as part of his acting training.

=== 2021-present: Squid Game and continued success ===
In 2021, Park gained international fame after playing Cho Sang-woo in the first season of the Netflix series Squid Game. Following the success of the show, Park opened an account on Instagram, gaining over 800,000 followers in a single day. For his performance, he was nominated for the Primetime Emmy Award for Outstanding Supporting Actor in a Drama Series.

In 2022, Park appeared in three Netflix productions: Yaksha: Ruthless Operations, (Note: Time to Hunt and Yaksha: Ruthless Operations were intended for theatrical release. However, due to the COVID-19 pandemic, the worldwide distribution rights were sold to Netflix.) Money Heist: Korea – Joint Economic Area, and Narco-Saints. All three spent four to five weeks in the Global Top 10. In July 2022, Park signed with the US talent agency UTA. Later that year, he successfully hosted an episode of Saturday Night Live Korea, ranking first on the list of most buzzworthy performers on OTT shows.

In 2023, Park returned to the stage in a commercially and critically successful production of Faust. In 2024, he starred opposite Jeon Do-yeon in Simon Stone's production of The Cherry Orchard in Seoul. The play received positive reviews and over the following two years had limited engagements in Busan, Hong Kong, Singapore, and Adelaide, Australia. Its tour concluded in September 2026 with 11 sold-out performances at the Park Avenue Armory in New York City, making it the first Korean-language production to be presented at the venue.

In 2025, Park appeared in a total of seven projects, including the series Karma and The Price of Confession, the film The Great Flood, and a small role in the American series Butterfly. Despite receiving polarizing reviews, The Great Flood became the first South Korean film to enter Netflix's ranking of the top ten non-English films of all time, achieving fifth place.

In 2026, Park starred in the series The Scarecrow, which is based on a real-life serial murder case spanning over 30 years, from 1988 to 2019. He also recorded a cover of Kim Kwang-seok's song "The Forgotten" for the soundtrack. The series became the second highest-rated in ENA's history. For his performance, Park won the Blue Dragon Series Award for Best Actor and the Grand Prize (Daesang) at the Korea Drama Awards.

== Other ventures ==
Park enjoys drawing as a hobby and formed the "Drawing Boys Club" with actor Lee Hee-jun and artist KUN. Their first collaborative work was presented at the Kiaf SEOUL art fair in 2022.

=== Philanthropy ===
In 2020, Park participated in the "100 Actors Reading World Literature" audiobook project, organized by the Korea Theater Artists Welfare Foundation, EBS, and Communication Books. All of the participants' royalties were donated to the foundation, which provides theater professionals with emergency livelihood assistance, medical expense coverage, free health checkups, and educational scholarships for their children.

In March 2025, Park donated ₩30 million to the Hope Bridge Korea Disaster Relief Association to support firefighters during the wildfires in Ulsan, Gyeongbuk, and Gyeongnam regions.

== Personal life ==
Over a ten-year period, Park was roommates first with actors Im Chul-soo and Lee Gi-seob, and then with Im and Park Jae-yoon.

Park was in a relationship with musical actress Lim Kang-hee from 2013 to 2016.

On January 14, 2019, Park married in a private ceremony held in Seoul. His wife gave birth to their first son on September 17, 2021. On August 23, 2026, the couple welcomed their second son.

== Filmography ==
=== Film ===
Year	Title	Role	Notes	Ref.
2014	The Pirates	Hwang Joong-geun	Bit part	
2015	Minority Opinion	Goo Hwan's assistant		
2016	Master	President Jin's bodyguard		
2019	By Quantum Physics: A Nightlife Venture	Lee Chan-woo		
2020	Time to Hunt	Han		
2022	Yaksha: Ruthless Operations	Kang Ji-hoon		
2023	Phantom	Takahara Kaito		
2025	Lobby	Bae-min		
2025	Good News	Ryeo Dol-chan	Cameo	
2025	The Great Flood	Son Hee-jo		
2025	Tristes Tropiques	Jang		
TBA	K.O. Club			

=== Television ===
Year	Title	Role	Notes	Ref.
2012	God of War	Kim Yun-hu		
2013	Me and Mom and Dad and Grandma and Anna	Father	One-act play	
2015–2016	Six Flying Dragons	Yi Ji-ran		
2016–2017	The Legend of the Blue Sea	Hong Dong-pyo		
2017	The Liar and His Lover	Bass player	Cameo (episode 1)	
2017–2018	Prison Playbook	Kim Je-hyuk	Also as Masked Singer (episode 4)	
2018	Memories of the Alhambra	Agent A	Cameo (episode 1–2, 4, 8)	
2019	Persona	Baek Jeong-u	Segment: "Collector"	
2021	Racket Boys	Lee Jae-joon	Cameo (episode 6)	
2021	Chimera	Cha Jae-hwan		
2021–2024	Squid Game	Cho Sang-woo	Main role (season 1); Cameo (season 2, episode 1)	
2022	Money Heist: Korea – Joint Economic Area	Berlin		
2022	Narco-Saints	Choi Chang-ho		
2025	Karma	Kim Beom-jun / The Witness		
2025	Butterfly	Yong Shik Choi	Cameo (episode 1, 3)	
2025	The Price of Confession	Baek Dong-hun		
2026	The Scarecrow	Kang Tae-joo		
TBA	The Great Oksuk	Yoon Tae-ung		
TBA	Paper Man	Oh Seung-eop		

=== Variety shows ===
Year	Title	Role	Notes	Ref.
2021	The Game Caterers	Cast member	Season 1 – Episode 10–12	
2022	Saturday Night Live Korea	Host	Season 3 – Episode 6	

=== Music video appearances ===
Year	Song title	Artist	Ref.
2022	"Last Scene"	Chen	

=== Hosting ===
Year	Title	Notes	Ref.
2017	38th Seoul Theater Festival	Closing ceremony; with Seo Yi-sook	

== Stage ==
=== Musical ===
Musical performances
Year	Title		Role	Theater	Date	Ref.
Year	English	Korean	Role	Theater	Date	Ref.
2008	Adolescence	사춘기	Young-min	Jeongmiso Theater	August 15 to October 12	
2009	Hero	영웅	Choi Jae-hyung	LG Art Center	October 26 to December 31	
2010–2011	Hero	영웅	Foreign Minister	Haeoreum Grand Theater	December 4 to January 15	
2011	The Chorus – Oedipus	더 코러스 – 오이디푸스	Oedipus	LG Art Center	April 26 to May 1	
2011	Hero	영웅	Foreign Minister	Ansan Culture and Arts Center	October 26 to December 31	
2012	The Goddess is Watching	여신님이 보고 계셔	Lee Chang-seop	Chungmu Art Hall	August 8	
2012–2013	Samcheon – Flower of Ruin	삼천-망국의 꽃	Ceremony general	Daehangno TOM Theater	October 26 to January 20	
2013	The Goddess is Watching	여신님이 보고 계셔	Lee Chang-seop	Daehangno Art One Theater	May 3 to August 25	
2013	The Chorus – Oedipus	더 코러스 – 오이디푸스	Oedipus	LG Art Center	October 9–20	
2014	The Chorus – Oedipus	더 코러스 – 오이디푸스	Oedipus	Victoria Theatre (Note: Singapore International Festival of Arts)	August 22–23	
2015	Asteroid B612	소행성 B612	Dad	CJ azit	August 24–25	

=== Theater ===
List of stage play(s)
Year	Title		Role	Theater	Date	Ref.
Year	English	Korean	Role	Theater	Date	Ref.
2007–2008	Mr. Lobby	미스터 로비		Hummings Art Hall	August 10 to June 8	
2007	Annapurna	안나푸르나	Gwang-nam	Gangnam Theatre	October 9–28	
2009	The 39 Steps	39 계단	Richard Hannay	Dongsung Art Centre	February 21 to March 29	
2009	The 39 Steps	39 계단	Richard Hannay	Sejong Center for the Performing Arts	July 30 to August 30	
2010	A Streetcar Named Desire	욕망이라는 이름의 전차	Steve	Dongsoong Art Center	March 19 to May 23	
2010	A Streetcar Named Desire	욕망이라는 이름의 전차	Steve	Hwaseong Art Hall	July 10–11	
2010	Fool for Love	풀 포 러브	Martin	SM Art Hall	July 6 to September 12	
2010	Fool for Love	풀 포 러브	Martin	Donggu Arts & Sports Center	October 23–24	
2011	Full Bloom	됴화만발	Kei	Namsan Arts Center	September 6–25	
2011	The Seagull	갈매기	Treplev	Sogang University Mary Hall	November 25 to December 11	
2014	Macbeth	맥베스	Macbeth	Myeongdong Theater	March 8–23	
2014	One Day	원데이		CJ azit	June 23–24	
2014	Frankenstein	프랑켄슈타인	The Creature	CJ Towol Theater	October 10 to November 9	
2014	Frankenstein	프랑켄슈타인	The Creature	Ansan Culture and Arts Center	November 15–16	
2014–2015	The Man from Earth	맨 프럼 어스	John Oldman	Daehangno Uniplex	November 7 to February 22	
2015	Judo Boy	유도소년	Park Kyung-chan	Daehangno Art One Theater	February 7 to May 3	
2015	Judo Boy	유도소년	Park Kyung-chan	Ansan Culture and Arts Center	May 21–24	
2015	Judo Boy	유도소년	Park Kyung-chan	Seongnam Arts Center	May 29–31	
2015	Judo Boy	유도소년	Park Kyung-chan	Goyang Aram Nuri Arts Center	August 21–23	
2015	Judo Boy	유도소년	Park Kyung-chan	Osan Culture and Arts Center	October 2–3	
2015	Judo Boy	유도소년	Park Kyung-chan	Bongsan Cultural Center	October 9–10	
2015	Judo Boy	유도소년	Park Kyung-chan	Uijeongbu Arts Center	October 23–24	
2015	Judo Boy	유도소년	Park Kyung-chan	Gunpo Culture and Arts Center	November 20–21	
2017	Male Impulse	남자충동	Jang-jeong	Daehangno TOM Theater	February 16 to March 26	
2018	NASSIM	낫심		Doosan Art Center	April 10–29	
2020	Sagunja – Seasons of Change	사군자_생의 계절		Jeongdong Theater	October 22 to November 8	
2023	Faust	파우스트	Mephistopheles	LG Arts Center SEOUL	March 31 to April 29	
2024–2026	The Cherry Orchard	벚꽃동산	Lopakhin	LG Arts Center SEOUL	June 4 to July 7, 2024	
2024–2026	The Cherry Orchard	벚꽃동산	Lopakhin	Busan Cultural Center	March 13–15, 2025	
2024–2026	The Cherry Orchard	벚꽃동산	Lopakhin	Hong Kong Cultural Centre	September 19–21, 2025	
2024–2026	The Cherry Orchard	벚꽃동산	Lopakhin	Esplanade – Theatres on the Bay	November 7–9, 2025	
2024–2026	The Cherry Orchard	벚꽃동산	Lopakhin	Adelaide Festival Centre	February 27 to March 1, 2026	
2024–2026	The Cherry Orchard	벚꽃동산	Lopakhin	Park Avenue Armory	September 16–26, 2026	

== Narration ==
Year	Title	Role	Notes	Ref.
2022	Architectural Audio Tour	Audio docent	LG Arts Center SEOUL	
2023	Whales and I	Narrator	SBS documentary; with Han Ji-min	
2023	Future Ending	Presenter / Narrator	TVING documentary	
2026	Companion	Narrator	KBS1 documentary	
2026	Hallan	Narrator	Barrier-free version	

=== Audio books ===
Year	Title	Publisher	ISBN	Ref.
2020	"To Build a Fire"	Communication Books	ISBN 979-11-288-8703-1	

== Discography ==
=== Soundtrack appearances ===
Title	Year	Album	Ref.
"The Forgotten"	2026	The Scarecrow OST	

== Accolades ==
=== Awards and nominations ===
Name of the award ceremony, year presented, category, nominee of the award, and the result of the nomination
Award ceremony	Year	Category	Nominee / Work	Result	Ref.
APAN Star Awards	2018	Excellence Award, Actor in a Miniseries	Prison Playbook	Nominated	
APAN Star Awards	2022	Excellence Award, Actor in an OTT Drama	Squid Game	Nominated	
APAN Star Awards	2023	Excellence Award, Actor in a Miniseries	Narco-Saints	Won	
Asia Star Awards	2022	Asia Wide Award	Park Hae-soo	Won	
Baeksang Arts Awards	2018	Best New Actor – Television	Prison Playbook	Nominated	
Baeksang Arts Awards	2020	Best New Actor – Film	Time to Hunt	Nominated	
Blue Dragon Film Awards	2019	Best New Actor	By Quantum Physics: A Nightlife Venture	Won	
Blue Dragon Series Awards	2022	Best Supporting Actor	Squid Game	Nominated	
Blue Dragon Series Awards	2025	Best Actor	Karma	Nominated	
Blue Dragon Series Awards	2026	Best Actor	The Scarecrow	Won	
Buil Film Awards	2020	Best New Actor	By Quantum Physics: A Nightlife Venture	Won	
Chunsa Film Art Awards	2020	Best New Actor	By Quantum Physics: A Nightlife Venture	Won	
Director's Cut Awards	2019	Best New Actor	By Quantum Physics: A Nightlife Venture	Nominated	
Director's Cut Awards	2023	Best Actor in Television	Narco-Saints	Nominated	
Director's Cut Awards	2026	Best Actor in Television	Karma	Nominated	
Dong-A Theater Awards	2012	Yoo In-chon Best New Actor	The Chorus – Oedipus & Full Bloom	Won	
Global OTT Awards	2022	Best Supporting Actor	Squid Game	Won	
Grand Bell Awards	2020	Best New Actor	By Quantum Physics: A Nightlife Venture	Nominated	
Hollywood Critics Association TV Awards	2022	Best Supporting Actor in a Streaming Series, Drama	Squid Game	Nominated	
Korea Drama Awards	2026	Grand Prize	The Price of Confession & The Scarecrow	Won	
Korea Theater Awards	2011	Best New Actor	The Chorus – Oedipus & Full Bloom	Won	
Primetime Emmy Awards	2022	Outstanding Supporting Actor in a Drama Series	Squid Game	Nominated	
Screen Actors Guild Awards	2022	Outstanding Performance by an Ensemble in a Drama Series	Squid Game	Nominated	
The Seoul Awards	2018	Best New Actor (Drama)	Prison Playbook	Won	

=== State honors ===
Name of organization, year given, and name of honor
Organization	Year	Honor	Ref.
Newsis K-Expo Cultural Awards (Note: Established in 2019 and co-sponsored by Korea's Ministry of Culture, Sports and Tourism, Ministry of Foreign Affairs, Korea Creative Content Agency, Seoul Metropolitan Council and the Seoul Tourism Organization, it awards cultural icons, businesses, and individuals who have contributed greatly to Hallyu, the Korean wave.)	2022	Minister of Culture, Sports and Tourism Award	

=== Listicles ===
Name of publisher, year listed, name of listicle, and placement
Publisher	Year	Listicle	Placement	Ref.
Gold House (Note: The A100 List honours the most impactful Asians and Asian American & Pacific Islanders (AAPIs) in culture every May for AAPI Heritage Month. Gold House "champions trailblazing members of the AAPI community and their transformative contributions to entertainment, fashion, lifestyle, technology, business, social activism and politics from the past year".)	2022	A100 List (with Squid Game creator & stars)	Included	
Korean Film Council	2021	Korean Actors 200 (Note: Introducing the 200 actors who best embody the present and future of Korean cinema to the international film industry.)	Included	
