= Kwak Sun-young =

South Korean actress (born 1983)

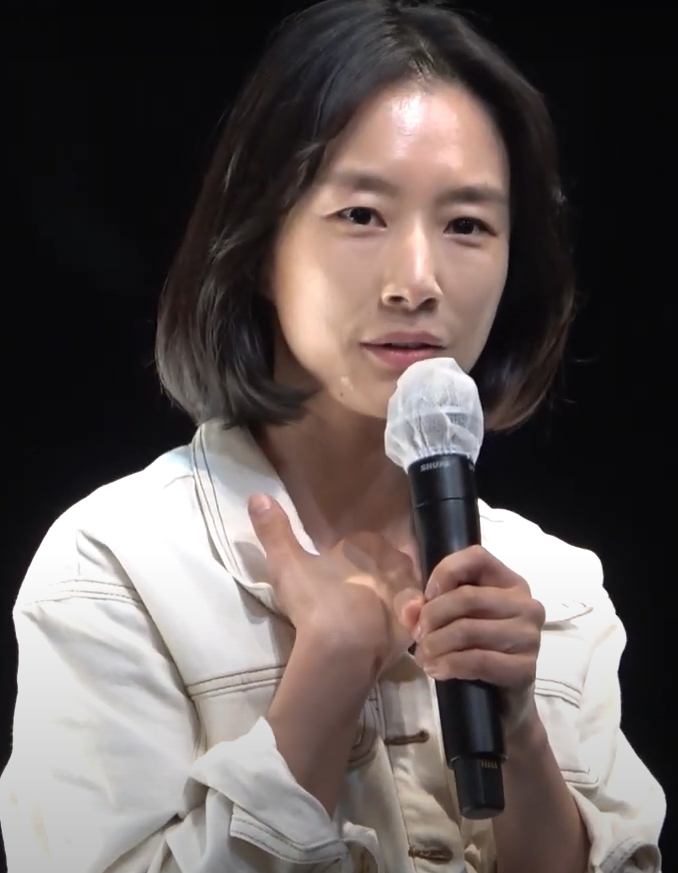
- Kwak in May 2020
- Born: May 11, 1983 (age 43); Seoul, South Korea
- Education: Dongguk University (Department of Acting)
- Occupation: Actress
- Years active: 2006–present
- Agent: Zion Entertainment
- Spouse: Unknown (m. 2015)
- Children: 1

Korean name
- Hangul: 곽선영
- Hanja: 郭善英
- RR: Gwak Seonyeong
- MR: Kwak Sŏnyŏng
- Website: zionent.kr

Kwak Sun-young (Korean: 곽선영; born May 11, 1983) is a South Korean actress. In 2006 she began her career in musical theater, starring in the musical Dalgona. She starred in the stage adaptation of Goong and Full House, among many other musicals and plays. After over a decade on the stage, Kwak made her television debut in 2018. She is best known for her roles in Encounter (2018–19), VIP (2019), Hospital Playlist (2020), Inspector Koo (2021), Behind Every Star (2022), and Brain Works (2023).

== Career ==
Kwak was born on May 11, 1983, in Seoul. Kwak's first contact with the stage was in high school, when she joined the theater department, even though she wanted to join a band instead. She studied acting at Dongguk University. Later in 2010, she enrolled in graduate school to pursue a master's degree in Performing Arts. After graduating, Kwak made her debut on the stage in the musical Dalgona in 2006. She played Seon, Catsby's girlfriend, in the musical The Great Catsby. In 2014, Kwak was cast in a musical adaptation of the television series Full House. In 2015, Kwak appeared in her first stage play, My Life is Pounding. In 2016, Kwak joined another musical production, Julie and Paul.

In 2018, Kwak started auditioning for advertisements and was cast in "Mom's Side", an advertisement for the energy drink Bacchus-F, which became popular and lead to her being cast in other advertisements and in her first television productions. That same year, she made her first television appearance in the mini-series Your Honor, where Kwak plays Song Ji-yeon, a victim of sexual assault. She later got her first supporting role as Song Hye-kyo's best friend and personal secretary in the television series Encounter. In 2020, Kwak starred in the medical drama Hospital Playlist, as Lee Ik-sun, younger sister of Lee Ik-jun (Jo Jung-suk) and love interest of Kim Jun-wan (Jung Kyung-ho). That same year, Kwak joined another theater production, Lungs.

== Personal life ==
Kwak Seon-young married her non-celebrity husband in 2015 and gave birth to a son the following year.

== Filmography ==
=== Film ===
Year	Title	Role	Ref.
2025	Somebody	Yeong-eun	
2025	Lobby	Director Kim	

=== Television series ===
Year	Title	Role	Notes	Ref.
2018	Your Honor	Song Ji-yun	Cameo	
2018	Encounter	Jang Mi-jin		
2019	My Country: The New Age	Han Hee Jae's mother	Cameo	
2019	VIP	Song Mi-na		
2020	Mystic Pop-up Bar	Eun Su / Sun Hwa	Cameo	
2020	Hospital Playlist	Lee Ik-sun	Season 1–2	
2021	Inspector Koo	Na Je-hee		
2021	KBS Drama Special: "Ordinary Goods"	Kim Jae-hwa		
2022	Behind Every Star	Cheon Je-in		
2023	Brain Works	Seol So-jung		
2023	Moving	Hwang Ji-hee		
2024	Crash	Min So-hee		
2026	The Scarecrow	Seo Ji-won		

== Stage ==
=== Musical ===
Musical performance(s)
Year	Title		Role	Theater	Date	Ref.
Year	English	Korean	Role	Theater	Date	Ref.
2006	Dalgona	달고나	ensemble cast	—N/a		
2007	The Great Catsby Season 1	위대한 캣츠비 Season1	Seon	Dongyang Arts Theatre 1 (former. Art Centre K Nemo Theatre)	March 9 to July 31	
2007	Notre Dame de Paris	노트르담 드 파리	Fleur de Reis	Gimhae Culture Centre Maru Hall		
2007	Notre Dame de Paris	노트르담 드 파리	Fleur de Reis	Goyang Aram Nuri Aram Theatre		
2007–2013	Finding Mr. Destiny	김종욱 찾기	Female	JTN Art Hall 1	October 23 to February 17	
2008	The Great Catsby Season 3	위대한 캣츠비 Season3	Seon	Dongyang Arts Theatre 1 (former. Art Centre K Nemo Theatre)	April 8 to December 31	
2008	Notre Dame de Paris	노트르담 드 파리	Fleur de Reis	Sejong Centre for the Performing Arts Grand Theatre	January 18 to February 28	
2008	Notre Dame de Paris	노트르담 드 파리	Fleur de Reis	Seongnam Art Centre Opera House		
2008	Notre Dame de Paris	노트르담 드 파리	Fleur de Reis	Daegu Opera House		
2008	Notre Dame de Paris	노트르담 드 파리	Fleur de Reis	Daejeon Arts Centre Art Hall		
2008	Notre Dame de Paris	노트르담 드 파리	Fleur de Reis	Gimhae Culture Centre Maru Hall		
2008	Polaroid	폴라로이드	Jang Sun-young	Daehak-ro Free Theatre	July 1 to August 24	
2008	Finding Mr. Destiny	김종욱 찾기	Female	Cheonan City Hall Bonseo Hall		
2009	Notre Dame de Paris	노트르담 드 파리	Fleur de Reis	Busan Citizens' Centre Grand Theatre		
2009	Finding Mr. Destiny	김종욱 찾기	Female	Daegu Bongsan Cultural Centre Grand Performance Hall (Gion Hall)		
2009	Notre Dame de Paris	노트르담 드 파리	Fleur de Reis	Daegu Gyemyung Art Centre		
2009	Finding Mr. Destiny	김종욱 찾기	Female	Daejeon Arts Centre Ensemble Hall		
2009	Notre Dame de Paris	노트르담 드 파리	Fleur de Reis	Sejong Centre for the Performing Arts Grand Theatre		
2009	Notre Dame de Paris	노트르담 드 파리	Fleur de Reis	Ulsan Culture and Arts Centre Grand Performance Hall		
2009	Laundry	빨래	Seo Na-young	Doosan Art Centre Yeongang Hall	April 28 to June 14	
2009	Notre Dame de Paris	노트르담 드 파리	Fleur de Reis	Daejeon Arts Centre Art Hall		
2009	Notre Dame de Paris	노트르담 드 파리	Fleur de Reis	National Theatre Haeoreum Theatre		
2009	Notre Dame de Paris	노트르담 드 파리	Fleur de Reis	Seongnam Art Centre Opera House		
2009	Finding Mr. Destiny	김종욱 찾기	Female	Seongnam Art Centre Ensemble Theatre		
2009	Finding Mr. Destiny	김종욱 찾기	Female	MBC Lotte Art Hall		
2009	Finding Mr. Destiny	김종욱 찾기	Female	Daegu Bongsan Cultural Centre Grand Performance Hall (Gion Hall)		
2010	The Singles	싱글즈	Nanan	JTN Art Hall 3	April 6 to October 3	
2010	Goong	궁	Shin Chae-kyung	National Museum of Korea Theatre	September 8 to October 24	
2010	Goong	궁	Shin Chae-kyung	Sori Cultural Arts Center	December 4 to 5	
2010	Goong	궁	Shin Chae-kyung	Cheonma Art Centre Grand Hall	December 11 to 12	
2010	Goong	궁	Shin Chae-kyung	Chungnam University Jeongshimhwa International Cultural Centre Jeongshimhwa Hall	December 18 to 19	
2010	Goong	궁	Shin Chae-kyung	Gyeonggi Art Centre Grand Theatre	December 25 to 26	
2011	Goong	궁	Shin Chae-kyung	National Museum of Korea for Theater	September 16 to October 9	
2011–2012	She Loves Me	쉬 러브즈 미	Amalia Ballash	Daehangno SH Art Hall	November 12 to January 29	
2012	Mozart Opera Rock	모차르트 오페라 락	Constance Weber	Daegu Keimyung Art Center	February 14 to March 11	
2012	Mozart Opera Rock	모차르트 오페라 락	Constance Weber	Seongnam Arts Center Opera House	March 30 to April 29	
2012	Bu Yong Ji-ae - Andong	부용지애 - 안동	Kim's Virgin	Andong Hahoe Village Buryongdae	August 4 to 8	
2013	Finding Mr. Destiny - Gunpo	김종욱 찾기 - 군포	Female	Gunpo Culture and Arts Centre Azalea Hall (small performance hall)	February 23 to 16	
2013	Hymn of Death	사의 찬미	Yun Sim-deok	Dongtan Complex Culture Centre Banseok Art Hall	June 28 to 30	
2013	Laundry	빨래	Seo Na-young	Art One Theater 2	March 14 to October 5	
2013	Goong - Osaka	궁	Shin Chae-kyung	Osaka BRAVA Theatre	July 5 to 21	
2013–2014	Laundry	빨래	Seo Na-young	Art One Theater 2	October 11 to March 2	
2014	Full House	풀 하우스	Han Ji-eun	Dongsung Art Centre Dongsung Hall	April 11 to June 8	
2014	Salieri	살리에르	Katrina	Sejong Center for the Performing Arts M Theater	July 22 to August 31	
2014	Hymn of Death	사의 찬미	Yun Sim-deok	Yes24 Stage 1	August 4	
2014–2015	Love Letter	러브레터	Itsuki Fujii and Hiroko Watanabe	Dongsung Arts Center Dongsung Hall	December 2 to February 15	
2015	Hymn of Death	사의 찬미	Yun Sim-deok	Yes24 Stage 1	June 6 to September 6	
2016	Julie and Paul	줄리 앤 폴	Julie	CJ Azit Daehak-ro (formerly SM Art Hall)	July 4 to 5	
2017	Hymn of Death	사의 찬미	Yun Sim-deok	Yes24 Stage 1	July 29 to October 29	
2017–2018	Me and Natasha and The White Donkey	나와 나타샤와 흰 당나귀	Sleeper	Daehangno Uniplex Building 2	October 11 to January 28	
2017–2018	Julie and Paul	줄리 앤 폴	Julie	Daehakro Arts Theater Small Theater	December 23 to January 7	

=== Theater ===
List of stage play(s)
Year	Title		Role	Theater	Date	Ref.
Year	English	Korean	Role	Theater	Date	Ref.
2015	My Life is Pounding	두근두근 내 인생	Choi Mi-ra	Uniplex 2	March 13 to May 25	
2020	Theatrical Battle 8 - Lungs	연극열전8 - 렁스	W	Art One Theater Hall 2	March 9 to July 5	

== Discography ==
=== Soundtrack appearances ===
Title	Year	Album	Ref.
"The Forgotten" (잊혀지는 것)	2026	The Scarecrow OST Part 3	

== Awards and nominations ==
Name of the award ceremony, year presented, category, nominee(s) of the award and the result of the nomination
Award ceremony	Year	Category	Nominee(s)/work(s)	Result	Ref.
Blue Dragon Series Awards	2024	Best Supporting Actress	Moving	Nominated	
Blue Dragon Series Awards	2026	Best Supporting Actress	The Scarecrow	Nominated	
KBS Drama Awards	2021	Best Actress in Drama Special/TV Cinema	Drama Special – Oddinary	Nominated	
Korea Drama Awards	2026	Excellence Actress	The Scarecrow	Won	
SBS Drama Awards	2019	Best New Actress	VIP	Nominated	
