= Love All Play (TV series) =

2022 South Korean television series

- Promotional poster
- Also known as: 493km for You; Going to You at a Speed of 493km
- Hangul: 너에게 가는 속도 493km
- Hanja: 너에게 가는 速度 493km
- Lit.: The Speed to You Is 493km
- RR: Neoege ganeun sokdo 493km
- MR: Nŏege kanŭn sokto 493km
- Genre: Drama; Romance; Sports drama
- Created by: KBS Drama Division
- Written by: Heo Sung-hye
- Directed by: Jo Woong
- Starring: Park Ju-hyun; Chae Jong-hyeop; Park Ji-hyun; Kim Mu-jun; Seo Ji-hye
- Music by: Park Se-joon
- Country of origin: South Korea
- Original language: Korean
- No. of episodes: 16

Production
- Executive producer: Yoon Jae-hyeok (KBS)
- Producers: Kim Ji-woo; Bae Seong-woong
- Production company: Blitzway Studios

Original release
- Network: KBS2
- Release: April 20 – June 9, 2022

Love All Play (Korean: 너에게 가는 속도 493km) is a 2022 South Korean television series starring Park Ju-hyun, Chae Jong-hyeop, Park Ji-hyun, Kim Mu-jun and Seo Ji-hye. The series depicts a hot sports romance in a badminton business team. It premiered on KBS2 on April 20, 2022, and aired every Wednesday and Thursday at 21:50 (KST) with 16 episodes. It is also available for streaming on Disney+ in selected regions.

Love All Play holds the record for the lowest-ever peak rating for a Korean drama airing on free television during prime time. Unprecedentedly, its ratings never broke the 2% mark, as its pilot episode rating of 1.9% was its highest. Its ratings dipped to a low of 0.9% for its penultimate episode, with only the 2020 drama Welcome scoring a lower single-episode rating of 0.8%. Overall, the ratings of Love All Play averaged 1.4%, beating the previous low of 1.6% set by the MBC drama Oh My Ladylord in 2021 and holding the record for two years until KBS2 drama Dare to Love Me drew average ratings of 1.3% in 2024.

== Synopsis ==
The series is a sports romance drama about the passion and affectionate love between the male and female mixed-doubles protagonists within their group of badminton team members.

== Cast ==
=== Main ===
- Park Ju-hyun as Park Tae-yang, a badminton player whose life is all about sports.
- Chae Jong-hyeop as Park Tae-joon, a player who views badminton as just a profession. A person who dreams of a comfortable life after his retirement, but joins the business team Yunis after being cut off from the city hall team.
- Park Ji-hyun as Park Jun-young, Tae-joon older sister. She is an Olympic gold medalist who retired due to an accident.
- Kim Mu-jun as Yook Jeong-hwan
- Seo Ji-hye as Lee Yoo-min, the queen of overlapping jinxes.

=== Supporting ===
==== Yunis Badminton Team coaches ====
- Jo Han-chul as Lee Tae-sang
- In Gyo-jin as Joo Sang-hyeon, Yunis's Tiger coach due to his austere personality and strict rules. So he leads the team. Hence, he is known as 'Juralli' for players.
- Lee Seo-hwan as Kim Si-bon, Yunis Team trainer.

==== Yunis Badminton Team players ====
- Choi Seung-yoon as Yeon Seung-woo
- Jo Soo-hyang as Lee Young-shim
- Moon Dong-hyeok as Go Dong-wan
- Kwon So-hyun as Cheon Yu-ri
- Bin Chan-wook as Oh Seon-su
- Jeon Hye-won as Yang Seong-sil
- Lee Chae-min as Lee Ji-ho
- Kim Nu-rim as New players

==== Others ====
- Jeon Bae-soo as Park Man-soo, Tae-yang's father.
- Lee Ji-hyun as Tae-joon and Jun-young's mother.
- Sung Ki-yoon as Park Nam-goo, Tae-joon's father and Badminton equipment shop owner.

=== Extended ===
- Park Doo-shik as Koo Hyuk-bong, National badminton player.
- Lee Min-jae as Eden, of Han Woong Electronics, especially as Yook Jung-hwan's junior and rival.

=== Special appearance ===
- Kim Hyun-joo as President of Yunis Business Team.
- Park Ah-sung as Sneaker seller
- Jin Seon-kyu as A sushi restaurant owner, who has a special relationship with Park Tae-yang.

== Production ==
The first script reading of the cast was held at the KBS annex in October 2021.

On February 18, 2022, Chae Jong-hyeop tested positive for the COVID-19 self-diagnosis kit and conducted a PCR test. A day later, it was revealed that he tested negative for COVID-19 PCR test and filming resumed soon as it was confirmed that Chae Jong-hyeop tested negative.

== Original soundtrack ==
=== Part 1 ===
Released on April 21, 2022
No.	Title	Lyrics	Music	Artist	Length
1.	"There, There" (당신의 밤이 그만 불안하기를)	Yoon Da-on; Factist	Factist; Yoon Da-on	Baek A-yeon	3:55
2.	"There, There" (당신의 밤이 그만 불안하기를; Inst.)		Factist; Yoon Da-on		3:55
Total length:					7:50

=== Part 2 ===
Released on April 22, 2022
No.	Title	Lyrics	Music	Artist	Length
1.	"Secret" (말할 수 없는 비밀)	Jayins	Runy; Jayins; Park Jung-jun; Shim Gyu-tae	Yun DDan DDan	3:11
2.	"Secret" (말할 수 없는 비밀; Inst.)		Runy; Jayins; Park Jung-jun; Shim Gyu-tae		3:11
Total length:					6:22

=== Part 3 ===
Released on April 28, 2022
No.	Title	Lyrics	Music	Artist	Length
1.	"Flyin"	Hyezoo; Kyum Lyk	Moon kim; Kyum Lyk; Moolf	Kevin (T1419)	3:05
2.	"Flyin" (Inst.)		Moon kim; Kyum Lyk; Moolf		3:05
Total length:					6:10

=== Part 4 ===
Released on May 4, 2022
No.	Title	Lyrics	Music	Artist	Length
1.	"Keep This Moment" (이 순간을 간직해)	Runy	Runy; Iver; Jo In-ho	Jinho (Pentagon)	3:20
2.	"Keep This Moment" (이 순간을 간직해; Inst.)		Runy; Iver; Jo In-ho		3:20
Total length:					6:40

=== Part 5 ===
Released on May 5, 2022
No.	Title	Lyrics	Music	Artist	Length
1.	"When The Door Opens" (문이 열리면)	Romantic Sashimi	Romantic Sashimi; Mierce; Kim Jun-tae	JT&Marcus	3:27
2.	"When The Door Opens" (문이 열리면; Inst.)		Romantic Sashimi; Mierce; Kim Jun-tae		3:27
Total length:					6:54

=== Part 6 ===
Released on May 11, 2022
No.	Title	Lyrics	Music	Artist	Length
1.	"The Distant Future" (먼 훗날에)	Han Joon	Seo Jae-ha; Kim Young-seong	Jeon Sang-geun	3:59
2.	"The Distant Future" (먼 훗날에; Inst.)		Seo Jae-ha; Kim Young-seong		3:59
Total length:					7:58

=== Part 7 ===
Released on May 12, 2022
No.	Title	Lyrics	Music	Artist	Length
1.	"By Your Side" (너의 곁으로)	Jayins	Jayins; Han Jae-wan	415	4:06
2.	"By Your Side" (너의 곁으로; Inst.)		Jayins; Han Jae-wan		4:06
Total length:					8:12

=== Part 8 ===
Released on May 18, 2022
No.	Title	Lyrics	Music	Artist	Length
1.	"Don't Walk Away"	Park Bo-jeong	Park Bo Jeong; J.O	Lisa	3:28
2.	"Don't Walk Away" (Inst.)		Park Bo Jeong; J.O		3:28
Total length:					6:56

=== Part 9 ===
Released on May 19, 2022
No.	Title	Lyrics	Music	Artist	Length
1.	"Something"	Red Socks; INAN	Red Socks; INAN	Songsun (Tri.be)	3:47
2.	"Something" (Inst.)		Red Socks; INAN		3:47
Total length:					7:34

=== Part 10 ===
Released on May 25, 2022
No.	Title	Lyrics	Music	Artist	Length
1.	"Time"	Woo Sun	RUNY; Park Jeong-jun; Sim Kyu-tae	Park Jang-hyun (Vromance)	4:42
2.	"Time" (Inst.)		RUNY; Park Jeong-jun; Sim Kyu-tae		4:42
Total length:					9:24

=== Part 11 ===
Released on May 26, 2022
No.	Title	Lyrics	Music	Artist	Length
1.	"My Own Season"	Ondine; Golden Doohyun; DEMIIAN; Bull$EyE; MEANG CO	Golden Doohyun; DEMIIAN; MEANG CO; Ham Gil-soo	Park Ju-hyun	3:44
2.	"My Own Season" (Inst.)		Red Socks; INAN		3:44
Total length:					7:29

=== Part 12 ===
Released on June 1, 2022
No.	Title	Lyrics	Music	Artist	Length
1.	"Diamond"	Soobin; Bull$EyE	Nomasgood; Sam Carter	Yonghoon (Onewe)	3:10
2.	"Diamond" (Inst.)		Nomasgood; Sam Carter		3:10
Total length:					6:20

== Ratings ==
Average TV viewership ratings (nationwide)
Ep.	Original broadcast date	Average audience share (Nielsen Korea)
1	April 20, 2022	1.9% (31st)
2	April 21, 2022	1.8% (34th)
3	April 27, 2022	1.7% (32nd)
4	April 28, 2022	1.5% (39th)
5	May 4, 2022	1.2% (43rd)
6	May 5, 2022	1.2% (50th)
7	May 11, 2022	1.4% (34th)
8	May 12, 2022	1.6% (32nd)
9	May 18, 2022	1.1% (44th)
10	May 19, 2022	1.1% (47th)
11	May 25, 2022	1.3% (37th)
12	May 26, 2022	1.0% (50th)
13	June 1, 2022	1.8% (36th)
14	June 2, 2022	1.4% (43rd)
15	June 8, 2022	0.9% (52nd)
16	June 9, 2022	1.3% (47th)
Average		1.4%
In the table above, the blue numbers represent the lowest ratings and the red numbers represent the highest ratings.
