= Lobby (film) =

2025 film by Ha Jung-woo

- Theatrical release poster
- Hangul: 로비
- RR: Robi
- MR: Robi
- Directed by: Ha Jung-woo
- Written by: Kim Kyung-chan; Ha Jung-woo
- Produced by: Byun Bong-hyun; Kim Young-hoon; Ha Jung-woo
- Starring: Ha Jung-woo; Kim Eui-sung; Kang Hae-lim; Lee Dong-hwi; Park Byung-eun; Kang Mal-geum; Choi Si-won; Cha Joo-young; Park Hae-soo; Kwak Sun-young
- Cinematography: So Jung-oh
- Edited by: Kim Sang-bum; Kim Ho-bin
- Music by: Dalpalan
- Production companies: Walkhouse Company; Film Momentum
- Distributed by: Showbox
- Release date: April 2, 2025
- Running time: 106 minutes
- Country: South Korea
- Language: Korean
- Box office: US$1.8 million

Lobby (Korean: 로비) is a 2025 South Korean black comedy film written, directed, and produced by Ha Jung-woo. Ha leads a ten-actor ensemble cast as Yoon Chang-wook, a startup CEO who tries to win a government project through golf course lobbying. The film was released on April 2, 2025.

== Plot ==
Yoon Chang-wook, a startup CEO who knows nothing but research, constantly loses opportunities and technology to his rival, Kwang-woo, due to shady under-the-table deals. His company's only way out is to win a ₩4 trillion government project, a one-shot chance to secure capital. But Kwang-woo, who is one step ahead in the lobbying game, has already won over Minister Cho. Turning his sights elsewhere, Chang-wook approaches Choi, the minister's husband and her closest confidant who holds real influence behind the scenes.

== Cast ==
- Ha Jung-woo as Yoon Chang-wook
- Kim Eui-sung as Manager Choi
- Kang Hae-lim as Jin Se-bin
- Lee Dong-hwi as Reporter Park
- Park Byung-eun as Son Kwang-woo
- Kang Mal-geum as Minister Cho
- Choi Si-won as Ma Tae-soo
- Cha Joo-young as Da-mi
- Park Hae-soo as Bae-min, golf course owner
- Kwak Sun-young as Director Kim
- Hyun Bong-sik as Garcini
- Uhm Ha-neul as Ho-sik
- Kim Jong-soo as Motors CEO
- Lee Ji-hoon as Kim Gwang-guk
- Chung Ye-jin as Sister
- Yoo Seung-mok as Director
- Park Kyung-hye as Jung-sook
- Sung Dong-il as Jin Se-bin's father

== Production ==
=== Development ===
Ha Jung-woo conceived the idea for Lobby during the COVID-19 pandemic, when he first began learning golf. Intrigued by the isolated and exclusive nature of golf courses, where private conversations often unfold among powerful individuals, Ha was inspired to set a political satire against this backdrop.

Filming focused heavily on ensemble scenes involving politicians, businessmen, and lobbyists during a golf round, blending dark comedy with tightly orchestrated dialogue. Ha emphasized precision during production, conducting more than ten full cast script readings and numerous scene-specific rehearsals to ensure rhythm and timing. Despite being a comedy, Ha directed the film with a serious tone, instructing the actors to treat their characters as if they were in a high-stakes drama, enhancing the film's satirical impact.

=== Casting ===
Ha cast Kang Hae-lim as pro golfer Jin after prioritizing natural presence and an authentic golf swing over acting experience, aiming for realism on the course. Kang Mal-geum joined the film later in production, replacing Ra Mi-ran as the corrupt Minister Cho. She was drawn to the script and learned golf for the first time to prepare for the role.

=== Filming ===
Principal photography for Lobby began on 14 September 2023 and ended on December.

== Release ==
Lobby premiered in South Korean theaters on 2 April 2025, distributed by Showbox. The film was released on digital platforms in South Korea on April 29.

=== Box office ===
The film was released on April 2, 2025 on 1,010 screens. It opened at second place at the South Korean box office with 37,157 admissions.

As of April 5, 2025, the film has grossed US$1,071,184 from 165,311 admissions.

== Reception ==
=== Accolades ===
| Award ceremony | Year | Category | Recipient(s) | Result | Ref. |
|---|---|---|---|---|---|
| Golden Cinematography Awards | 2025 | Best Supporting Actress | Kwak Sun-young | Won | |
