= Kang Mal-geum =

South Korean actress (born 1979)

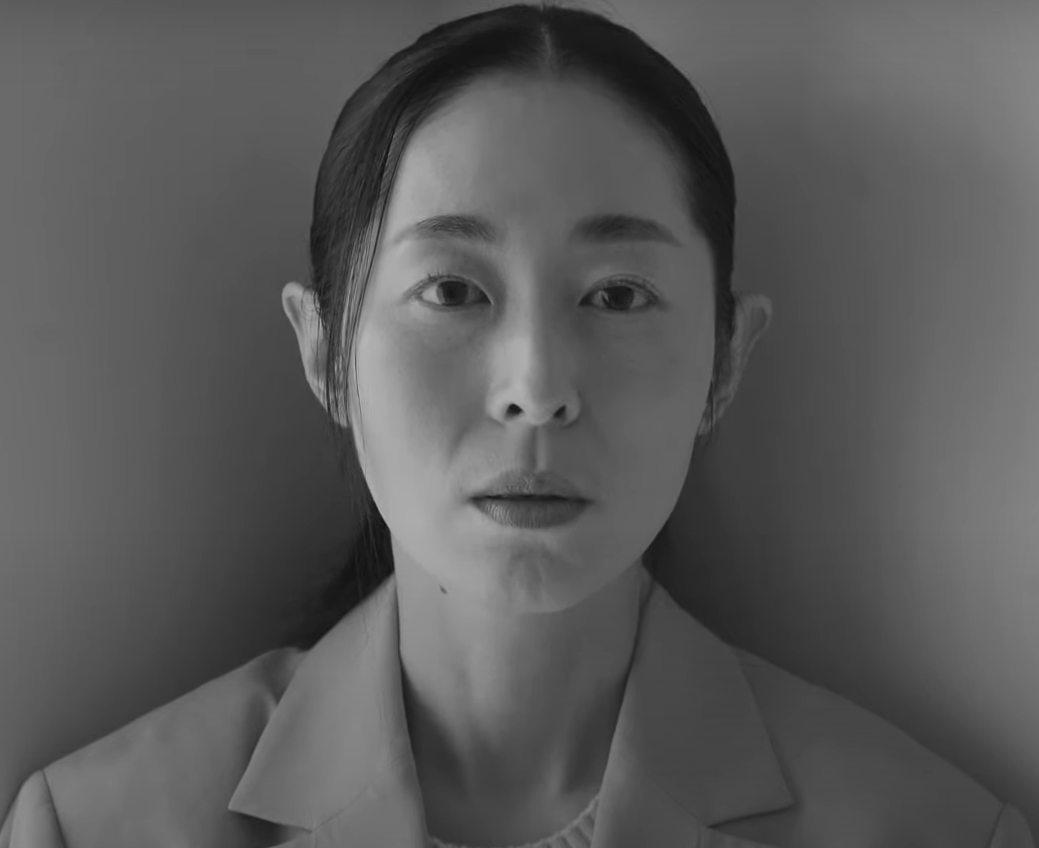
- Kang for Marie Clarie Korea in March 2022
- Born: Kang Soo-hye; January 3, 1979 (age 47); Busan, South Korea
- Education: Pusan National University - Bachelor of Arts in Korean Language and Literature
- Occupation: Actress
- Years active: 2010–present
- Agent: Ace Factory

Korean name
- Hangul: 강수혜
- RR: Gang Suhye
- MR: Kang Suhye

Stage name
- Hangul: 강말금
- RR: Gang Malgeum
- MR: Kang Malgŭm

Kang Soo-hye (Korean: 강수혜; born January 3, 1979), better known by the stage name Kang Mal-geum (강말금), is a South Korean actress. She graduated in Arts from Pusan National University, Department of Korean Language and Literature. She made her acting debut in 2010 in the film Yong-Tae: The Ordinary Memories. She is known for her role in the film Lucky Chan-sil (2019), for which she earned six "Best New Actress" and one "Best Actress" awards in seven different award shows. She also appeared in the film The Chase (2017) and the television series Legal High (2019) and Missing: The Other Side (2020). In 2021, she appeared in a small role on the hit Netflix survival drama series Squid Game.

== Early life ==
Kang was born in Busan in 1979 and graduated from Busan National University in Korean Language and Literature. After graduating, she worked for a trading company for 4 years, then made her debut in Chungmuro in 2010 after debuted earlier onstage in Daehak-ro in 2007.

Director Kim Cho-hee, who watched "Free acting" at the Jeongdongjin Independent Film Festival, contacted Kang directly and suggested appearing in Lucky Chanshil. While working at the tasting corner of the mart, Kang became the main character of a feature film for the first time at forty while going back and forth between theatrical stages and short films.

== Filmography ==
=== Film ===
Year	Title	Role	Notes	Ref.
2010	Yong-Tae: The Ordinary Memories			
2011	From the End		Short film	
2014	Encounter		Short film	
2016	A Man in the Midnight		Short film	
2017	The Chase	Caregiver 2		
2017	Daydream (Baek-il-mong)			
2018	The Monologue			
2019	Idol	Myung-hui's wife		
2019	Family Affair	Homeroom teacher		
2019	Lucky Chan-sil	Lee Chan-sil	Won 7 awards	
2019	Gyeongwon		Short film	
2020	A Bedsore	Nurse		
2020	More Than Family	Ho Hoon's mother		
2022	In Our Prime	Han Ji-woo's mother		
2022	Drown	Hye-soo		
2022	Birth	Teresa Kim		
2023	Soulmate	a curator at an art museum		
2024	Land of Happiness	Ok Jeong-ae		
2025	Lobby	Minister Cho		

=== Television series ===
Year	Title	Role	Notes	Ref.
2018	Children of Nobody	Si-wan's mother		
2019	Legal High	Lee Eun-ji		
2019	Beautiful World	Eun Kyeong-seon		
2020	Missing: The Other Side	Kim Hyeon-mi	Season 1	
2020	Please Don't Date Him	Telegram girl		
2020	KBS Drama Special: "The Joys and Sorrows of Work"	Lee Ji-hye	one act-drama	
2021	Mouse	Ba Reum's aunt	Cameo	
2021	Sell Your Haunted House	Manager Joo / Joo Hwa-jeong		
2021	Squid Game	Gi-hun's ex-wife		
2021	The Silent Sea	Song Won-kyung		
2021–2022	The Red Sleeve	Hong Hye-bin / Lady Hyegyŏng		
2022	Thirty-Nine	Cha Mi-hyun		
2022	Military Prosecutor Doberman	Do Soo-kyung		
2023	Divorce Attorney Shin	Kim So-yeon		
2023	The Good Bad Mother	Jung Gum-ja		
2023	Miraculous Brothers	Chae Woo-jung		
2023–2024	Gyeongseong Creature	Choi Seong-sim	Season 1	
2025	When Life Gives You Tangerines	Motel Owner	Cameo (episode 2,3)	
2025	Knock-Off	Jegal Hyeon-suk		
2026	We Are All Trying Here	Ko Hye-jin		

== Stage ==
=== Musical ===
Musical performances
Year	Title		Role	Theater	Ref.
Year	English	Korean	Role	Theater	Ref.
2013	Heavy Metal Girls	헤비메탈 걸스		Hansung Art Hall 1	

=== Theatre ===
Theater performances
Year	Title		Role	Theater	Ref.
Year	English	Korean	Role	Theater	Ref.
2008	Commedia	꼬메디아	Scaramouche	Sangmyeong Art Hall 1	
2012	Penn	뻘	Jimaki	Doosan Art Centre Space111	
2012	Ro Pung Chan's Nomadic Theater	로풍찬 유랑극장	Gobongja	Yeonwoo Small Theatre (Daehak-ro)	
2014	Hermes	헤르메스	Yoo Jeong-sook	Theatre out of	
2014	Ro Pung Chan's Nomadic Theater	로풍찬 유랑극장	Gobongja	Daehakro Arts Theatre Small Theatre	
2015	Kyung-sook Kyung-sook's Father	경숙이, 경숙아버지	Jaya	Yes24 Stage 3	
2015	Uncle Sunwoo	순우 삼촌		Daehak-ro Sundol Theatre	
2016	2016 Mountain Forest Classic Theatre - Oresteia	2016 산울림 고전극장 - 오레스테이아		Sanullim Small Theatre	
2016	Doosan Humanities Theatre 2016 Adventure - Game	두산인문극장 2016 모험 - 게임	Florence Margaret	Doosan Art Center Space111	
2016	Dandelion Wind	민들레 바람되어	Old lady	Yes24 Stage 3	
2017	Richard III	리처드3세		Arko Arts Theatre Grand Theatre	
2017	The Women of Troy	트로이의 여인들		Art Space Seoul	
2018	Red Peters - K's Reading	빨간 피터들 - K의 낭독회		Samil-il Warehouse Theatre	
2018	Lonely person, difficult person, sad person	외로운 사람, 힘든 사람, 슬픈 사람	Aleksandr Vladimirovich Serebryakov	Doosan Art Center Space111	

== Ambassadorship ==
Year	Title	Ref.
2021	21st Seoul International Alternative Visual Arts Festival	
2022	22nd Seoul International Alternative Visual Arts Festival	

== Accolades ==
=== Awards and nominations ===
Name of the award ceremony, year presented, category, nominee of the award, and the result of the nomination
Award ceremony	Year	Category	Nominee / Work	Result	Ref.
Baeksang Arts Awards	2020	Best New Actress – Film	Lucky Chan-sil	Won	
Baeksang Arts Awards	2022	Best Supporting Actress – Television	Thirty-Nine	Nominated	
Baeksang Arts Awards	2024	Best Supporting Actress – Television	The Good Bad Mother	Nominated	
Blue Dragon Film Awards	2021	Best New Actress	Lucky Chan-sil	Won	
Buil Film Awards	2020	Best New Actress	Lucky Chan-sil	Won	
Busan Film Critics Awards	2020	Best Actress	Lucky Chan-sil	Won	
Cine21 Film Awards	2020	Best New Actress	Lucky Chan-sil	Won	
Chunsa Film Art Awards	2021	Best New Actress	Lucky Chan-sil	Nominated	
Director's Cut Awards	2022	Best Actress in Film	Lucky Chan-sil	Nominated	
Director's Cut Awards	2022	Best New Actress in Film	Lucky Chan-sil	Won	
KBS Drama Awards	2020	Best New Actress	Drama Special – The Joys and Sorrows of Work	Nominated	
KBS Drama Awards	2021	Best Supporting Actress	Sell Your Haunted House	Nominated	
Korean Association of Film Critics Awards	2020	Best New Actress	Lucky Chan-sil	Won	
Wildflower Film Awards	2020	Best Actress	Lucky Chan-sil	Nominated	
Wildflower Film Awards	2020	Best New Actress	Lucky Chan-sil	Won	
Women in Film Korea Festival	2020	Best New Actress	Lucky Chan-sil	Won	

=== Listicles ===
Name of publisher, year listed, name of listicle, and placement
Publisher	Year	Listicle	Placement	Ref.
Korean Film Council	2021	Korean Actors 200 (Note: The list introduces the 200 actors that best represent the present and future of Korean cinema to the people in the film industry all over the world.)	Placed	
