= Sell Your Haunted House =

2021 South Korean comedy fantasy drama

- Hangul: 대박부동산
- Hanja: 大박不動產
- Lit.: Daebak Real Estate
- RR: Daebak budongsan
- MR: Taebak pudongsan
- Genre: Comedy; Fantasy; Supernatural
- Created by: KBS Drama Production
- Written by: Ha Soo-jin; Jung Yeon-seo; Lee Young-hwa
- Directed by: Park Jin-seok
- Starring: Jang Na-ra; Jung Yong-hwa; Kang Hong-seok; Ahn Gil-kang
- Country of origin: South Korea
- Original language: Korean
- No. of episodes: 16

Production
- Executive producers: Ki Min-soo (KBS); Noh Sang-hoon
- Producers: Jeong Hae-ryong; Kim Jin-cheon
- Camera setup: Single-camera
- Running time: 70 minutes
- Production companies: Monster Union; May Queen Pictures

Original release
- Network: KBS2
- Release: April 14 – June 9, 2021

Sell Your Haunted House (Korean: 대박부동산) is a 2021 South Korean television series directed by Park Jin-seok for KBS. Starring Jang Na-ra, Jung Yong-hwa, Kang Hong-seok, and Ahn Gil-kang, the series follows an exorcist real estate agent. She performs exorcism on real estates where ghosts appear, and joins hands with a con-artist to unearth a secret. It premiered on KBS2 on April 14, 2021 and aired every Wednesday and Thursday at 21:30 (KST).

== Synopsis ==
Hong Ji-ah (Jang Na-ra) is a real estate broker and an exorcist. She owns Daebak Real Estate which offers the service to clean out buildings in which ghosts frequent and people have died in. She inherited the ability to exorcise from her deceased mother.

Oh In-beom (Jung Yong-hwa) is a con-artist who uses ghosts to earn money. He has a tragic past where his uncle died with no exact explanation why.

Hong Ji-ah and Oh In-beom team up to solve the secret behind her mother and his uncle's deaths 20 years ago.

== Cast ==
=== Main ===
- Jang Na-ra as Hong Ji-ah, an exorcist and owner of Daebak Real Estate

Her mother died 20 year ago during an exorcism. She wants to send her mother's spirit but cannot find the right psychic to possess her since she was an exorcist too.

- Jung Yong-hwa as Oh In-beom, a fraud who makes money using ghosts, but turns out be a psychic when he gets involved during an exorcism performed by Hong Ji-ah. He partners with Hong Ji-ah for money but later learns the secret about his childhood. His uncle was the last client of Hong Ji-ah's mother.

=== Supporting ===
- Ahn Gil-kang as Do Hak-seong, Chairman of Dohak Construction

A gangster in suit. He gets what he wants no matter what. Responsible for Oh In-beom's uncle's death.

- Kang Hong-seok as Chief Heo

Oh In-beom's friend and partner in crime. A hacker and con artist.

- Kang Mal-geum as Deputy director Joo

Manager of Daebak Real Estate. She has a mysterious past.

- Heo Dong-won as Kim Tae-jin

Boss of a nightclub, a former gangster.

- Baek Eun-hye as Hong Mi-jin, Hong Ji-ah's mother

An exorcist, she died during her last exorcism.

- Baek Hyun-joo as Chang Hwa-mo

She runs 'Changhwa Restaurant' across Daebak Real Estate. She is waiting for her son's return to her restaurant after he left her years ago.

- Choi Woo-sung as Hyung-sik

Physical education student and a spirit medium who exorcize evil spirits.

- Im Ji-kyu as Kim Byeong-ho, a ghost artist of painter Jo Hyun-seo
- Kim Mi-kyung as Yeom sajang (special appearance)

Owner of Blue Salt who supplies exorcism equipment to Daebak Real Estate and close to Hong Ji-ah and her family.

- Baek Ji-won as Lee Eun-hye, the director of Britium Art.
- Kim Dae-gon as Oh Seong-sik, kind uncle to Oh In-beom.
- Kim Sung-bum as police officer Kang Han-seok.
- Lee Chae-kyung as assistant Choi

=== Special appearances ===
- Seo Sang-won as Yang Woo-jin's father (ep. 1)
- Park Han-sol as young Joo Hwa-jung
- Kwon Dong-ho as Hwang Jae-woo [Green Villas] (ep. 5)

== Episodes ==
No. in season	Title	Synopsis
1	The Exorcist and the Con Artist	Hong Ji-ah uses her supernatural abilities to exorcise spirits from haunted properties through Daebak Realty, but remains unable to send away the spirit of her deceased mother, Mi-jin. Meanwhile, Oh In-bum uses fake ghost technology to scam property owners. When the two encounter each other at a haunted building, In-bum accidentally interferes with Ji-ah's exorcism, revealing that he possesses a rare and powerful psychic ability.
2	The Power of a True Medium	Ji-ah discovers that In-bum is a special medium whose presence restores her body heat and energy following an exorcism. After In-bum absorbs a spirit's memories during an exorcism at Dream Officetel, Ji-ah tests his abilities and proposes a partnership, hoping that his powers can help her free her mother's spirit.
3	An Unlikely Partnership	In-bum discovers a connection between Ji-ah's mother and his late uncle, Oh Sung-sik, who died under mysterious circumstances twenty years earlier. Although initially hesitant, Ji-ah agrees to work with In-bum. The pair investigate a new case involving an art gallery haunted by the spirit of a painter whose work was stolen.
4	Lingering Memories	Ji-ah completes the art gallery exorcism, but In-bum suffers severe side effects after absorbing the dead painter's emotions and memories. As he struggles with the emotional burden of being a medium, In-bum commits to helping Ji-ah uncover the truth surrounding the events of twenty years earlier.
5	The Shadows of Dohak Construction	Ji-ah encounters an unrested spirit connected to Do Hak-sung, the ruthless chairman of Dohak Construction. Recognizing a connection between the spirit and her mother's final exorcism, Ji-ah realizes that Do Hak-sung may be at the center of the mystery surrounding her mother's death. Meanwhile, the team investigates a haunted sauna.
6	Flashes of the Past	During the sauna exorcism, Ji-ah recovers fragmented memories from twenty years earlier, including the image of a young boy whose face she cannot identify. In-bum struggles with the emotional impact of absorbing the victim's memories, while Chairman Do begins investigating Daebak Realty and its connection to the events of the past.
7	Unraveling the Lies	Chairman Do attempts to pressure Ji-ah into selling Daebak Realty. Ji-ah and In-bum investigate the case of an elderly woman living in an area threatened by redevelopment. Meanwhile, Ji-ah continues searching for the missing 1979 Record of Exorcism, hoping it will reveal the circumstances surrounding her mother's death.
8	Shattered Trust	Ji-ah discovers that the young boy present on the night of her mother's death was In-bum, and that his uncle was involved in the tragedy. Devastated by the revelation, Ji-ah feels betrayed and ends her partnership with In-bum, ordering him to leave Daebak Realty.
9	The Painful Truth	In-bum uncovers evidence that his uncle did not die by suicide, as official records claimed, but was murdered by Do Hak-sung. Despite being rejected by Ji-ah, In-bum returns to help her when a dangerous exorcism requires the abilities of a powerful medium.
10	Sacrifices and Traps	Ji-ah and In-bum investigate the death of a young woman at a theater and devise a trap to expose the killer, using the victim's friend as bait. Meanwhile, Do Hak-sung intensifies his efforts to destroy Daebak Realty by targeting Ji-ah's manager, Ms. Ju.
11	Near-Fatal Encounter	Do Hak-sung traps Ji-ah and In-bum inside a cold-storage facility, leaving them in danger of dying from hypothermia. Ms. Ju is seriously injured while attempting to protect Ji-ah. After escaping, Ji-ah learns more about Ms. Ju's hidden past and her role in concealing information about her mother's death.
12	Exorcising the Past	Ji-ah successfully exorcises the spirit of In-bum's uncle, Oh Sung-sik, finally allowing him to pass on. In-bum absorbs Sung-sik's final memories and learns that Do Hak-sung forced his uncle to start an arson fire before murdering him to conceal his involvement.
13	The Threat of the Egg Ghost	A devastating fire caused by Do Hak-sung's redevelopment schemes results in numerous deaths, creating a non-human, faceless "Egg Ghost", an unformed spirit born from multiple sudden deaths. Ji-ah discovers that destroying an Egg Ghost requires an exorcist to make the ultimate sacrifice.
14	Unclasping the Tether	Ji-ah finally learns the truth about her mother's death. Twenty years earlier, Mi-jin was possessed while dealing with an Egg Ghost, forcing the young Ji-ah to strike the fatal blow herself. Ji-ah also realizes that her mother's spirit has remained bound to Earth not because of malice, but because Ji-ah's grief and guilt have prevented her from moving on.
15	Bringing Down Dohak Construction	Ji-ah and In-bum recover secret financial ledgers documenting Do Hak-sung's illegal activities and corporate crimes. As the police close in, Do Hak-sung goes on the run. During his escape, he falls to his death and returns as a vengeful spirit.
16	Final Farewell	Do Hak-sung's vengeful spirit possesses In-bum in a final attempt to destroy Ji-ah. Ji-ah manages to seal Do Hak-sung's spirit without killing In-bum. With her guilt and grief finally resolved, Ji-ah performs a final ritual that allows her mother's spirit to peacefully ascend. One year later, Ji-ah returns from traveling and reunites with In-bum, Ms. Ju and the Daebak Realty team, where they resume their work together.

== Production ==
On September 21, 2020, it was reported that Jang Na-ra and Jung Yong-hwa have received proposal to pair in an occult drama and they are considering it positively. In November 2020, the drama production company Monster Union confirmed the drama Daebak Real Estate for first half of 2021.

On February 12, 2021, it was reported that Jang Na-ra and Jung Yong-hwa were preparing for the drama. Kang Hong-seok and Baek Eun-hye had previously worked together in the tvN's Wednesday and Thursday drama What's Wrong with Secretary Kim (2018). Ahn Gil-kang and Baek Ji-won had previously worked together in the KBS2 weekend drama Once Again (2020).

== Original soundtrack ==
Sell Your Haunted House

Soundtrack album by Various
- Released: 2021
- Genre: Soundtrack
- Languages: Korean; English
- Labels: 5th Corps Music, Studio K, Dreamus

=== Part 1 ===
Released on April 14, 2021
No.	Title	Music	Artist	Length
1.	"I Got Ya" (Chorus: Jeon Seung-woo)	Park Seong-jin, Jeon Seung-woo, Choi Min-chang	Jung Yong-hwa (CNBLUE)	3:04
2.	"I Got Ya" (Inst.)	Park Seong-jin, Jeon Seung-woo, Choi Min-chang		3:04

=== Part 2 ===
Released on April 25, 2021
No.	Title	Lyrics	Music	Artist	Length
1.	"Don't Ask"	Dr. Kim	Dr. Kim	Shin Min-jung	3:13
2.	"Don't Ask" (Inst.)				3:13

=== Part 3 ===
Released on April 28, 2021
No.	Title	Lyrics	Music	Artist	Length
1.	"Don't Cry"	Dr. Kim	Dr. Kim	Joonghyuk Jang of Deokcheol Jang	3:52
2.	"Don't Cry" (Inst.)				3:52

=== Part 4 ===
Released on May 12, 2021
No.	Title	Lyrics	Music	Artist	Length
1.	"Daydream" (백일몽)	Sinsadong Horengi, Kim Jae-mi	Sinsadong Horengi, Kim Jae-mi	Jang Na-ra	3:09
2.	"Daydream" (Inst.)				3:09

=== Part 5 ===
Released on May 15, 2021
No.	Title	Lyrics	Music	Artist	Length
1.	"Only One" (단 하나의 (니아))	Woo Young-soo, Kinjium	Woo Young-soo, Kinjium	NIA	3:24
2.	"Only One" (Inst.)				3:24

=== Part 6 ===
Released on May 19, 2021
No.	Title	Lyrics	Music	Artist	Length
1.	"Someday" (언젠가 (정이한))	Seongjae, BOK	Seongjae, BOK	Lee Han-jeong	3:22
2.	"Someday" (Inst.)				3:22

=== Part 7 ===
Released on May 28, 2021
No.	Title	Lyrics	Music	Artist	Length
1.	"In a Dream" (꿈속에서)	Shim Gyu-tae	Shim Gyu-tae	Damu	4:21
2.	"In a Dream" (Inst.)				4:21

=== Part 8 ===
Released on May 29, 2021
No.	Title	Lyrics	Music	Artist	Length
1.	"Home"	WANT, ToX	WANT, ToX, Kim Seong-hyeok	Want	2:17
2.	"Home" (Inst.)				2:17

=== Part 9 ===
Released on June 2, 2021
No.	Title	Lyrics	Music	Artist	Length
1.	"If I Could" (에이민)	Seong-jin Park	Do-yeon Kim	Amin	3:41
2.	"If I Could" (Inst.)				3:41

=== Part 10 ===
Released on June 5, 2021
No.	Title	Lyrics	Music	Artist	Length
1.	"Again" (또르르)	Noody, alohaman	Noody, Tomyorang, Jo Seong-hwan	Joo Yi-hyun	4:39
2.	"Torre" (Inst.)				4:39

== Viewership ==
Sell Your Haunted House : South Korea viewers per episode (thousands)

Season	Episode number																Average
Season	1	2	3	4	5	6	7	8	9	10	11	12	13	14	15	16	Average
1	958	1075	1140	1056	1211	1149	1209	1120	1150	1128	1293	1230	1043	1040	1046	1023	1117

Source: Audience measurement performed nationwide by Nielsen Korea

Average TV viewership ratings
Ep.	Part	Original broadcast date	Average audience share (Nielsen Korea)		TNmS
Ep.	Part	Original broadcast date	Nationwide	Seoul	Nationwide
1	1	April 14, 2021	4.1%	N/A	4.5%
1	2	April 14, 2021	5.3%	4.9%	5.6%
2	1	April 15, 2021	3.7%	N/A	N/A
2	2	April 15, 2021	5.6%	5.2%	4.6%
3	1	April 21, 2021	3.7%	N/A	N/A
3	2	April 21, 2021	5.9%	5.7%	4.9%
4	1	April 22, 2021	3.7%	N/A	N/A
4	2	April 22, 2021	5.3%	4.7%	5.2%
5	1	April 28, 2021	5.0%	4.9%	4.5%
5	2	April 28, 2021	6.3%	5.9%	5.7%
6	1	April 29, 2021	3.9%	N/A	N/A
6	2	April 29, 2021	5.9%	5.8%	5.1%
7	1	May 5, 2021	4.2%	N/A	N/A
7	2	May 5, 2021	6.1%	5.4%	4.3%
8	1	May 6, 2021	4.0%	N/A	4.4%
8	2	May 6, 2021	5.9%	5.4%	5.4%
9	1	May 12, 2021	4.0%	N/A	4.3%
9	2	May 12, 2021	5.8%	4.9%	6.3%
10	1	May 13, 2021	4.5%	N/A	6.3%
10	2	May 13, 2021	5.9%	5.4%	5.2%
11	1	May 19, 2021	4.4%	N/A	4.8%
11	2	May 19, 2021	6.5%	6.0%	6.1%
12	1	May 20, 2021	5.1%	N/A	4.9%
12	2	May 20, 2021	6.9%	6.2%	6.5%
13	1	May 26, 2021	3.9%	N/A	N/A
13	2	May 26, 2021	5.9%	5.3%	5.3%
14	1	June 2, 2021 (Note: On May 27, the 2021 Volleyball Nations League' (VNL) game between Korea and Japan was aired live)	4.0%	N/A	N/A
14	2	June 2, 2021	5.9%	5.1%	5.7%
15	1	June 3, 2021	4.6%	N/A	N/A
15	2	June 3, 2021	5.8%	5.4%	4.8%
16	1	June 9, 2021	4.3%	N/A	N/A
16	2	June 9, 2021	5.5%	5.0%	5.7%
Average			5.1%	— (Note: Due to some ratings not recorded, the exact average rating is unknown.)	—
Special (Note: A special program of behind-the-scenes cut of the series will be aired on June 10, 2021.)	1	June 10, 2021	N/A	N/A	N/A
Special	2	June 10, 2021	N/A	N/A	N/A
In the table above, the blue numbers represent the lowest ratings and the red numbers represent the highest ratings.; N/A denotes that the rating is not known.

== Awards and nominations ==
Year	Award	Category	Recipient	Result	Ref.
2021	KBS Drama Awards	Top Excellence Award, Actor	Jung Yong-hwa	Nominated	
2021	KBS Drama Awards	Top Excellence Award, Actress	Jang Na-ra	Nominated	
2021	KBS Drama Awards	Excellence Award, Actor in a Miniseries	Jung Yong-hwa	Won	
2021	KBS Drama Awards	Excellence Award, Actress in a Miniseries	Jang Na-ra	Nominated	
2021	KBS Drama Awards	Best Supporting Actor	Ahn Gil-kang	Nominated	
2021	KBS Drama Awards	Best Supporting Actress	Kang Mal-geum	Nominated	
