= Kang Hong-seok =

South Korean actor

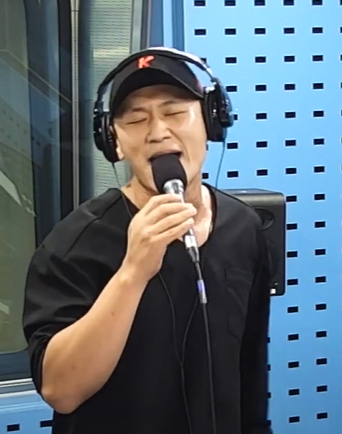
- Kang in 2020
- Born: February 11, 1986 (age 40); South Korea
- Education: Seoul Institute of the Arts – Theater Department
- Occupation: Actor
- Years active: 2008–present
- Agent: C-JeS Entertainment
- Spouse: Kim Ye-eun (m. 2016)
- Children: 1

Korean name
- Hangul: 강홍석
- RR: Gang Hongseok
- MR: Kang Hongsŏk

Kang Hong-seok (Korean: 강홍석; born February 11, 1986) is a South Korean actor.

== Personal life ==
Kang married musical actress, Kim Ye-eun on September 26, 2016. Their daughter was born on February 11, 2019.

== Filmography ==
=== Television series ===
Year	Title	Role	Ref.
2017	Chicago Typewriter	Won Dae-han	
2017	Manhole	Yoo Goo-gil	
2018	Welcome to Waikiki	Hong-seok (ep.13)	
2018	What's Wrong with Secretary Kim	Yang Cheol	
2019	Doctor Prisoner	Shin Hyun-sang	
2019	Hotel del Luna	Grim Reaper	
2019	Pegasus Market	Oh In-bae	
2020	The King: Eternal Monarch	Jang Michael / Jang Mi-reuk	
2020	Birthcare Center	Grim Reaper (cameo)	
2021	Sell Your Haunted House	Chief Heo	
2024	Captivating the King	Joo Sang-hwa(Yi In's royal guard)	

=== Film ===
Year	Title	Role	Ref.
2008	Rough Cut		
2019	Miss & Mrs. Cops	Kwak Yong-seok	
2022	Gentleman	Cho Chang-mo	

=== Variety show ===
Year	Title	Role	Ref.
2018	King of Mask Singer	Contestant as "Perception Changes Boy" (episodes 171–172)	

== Theater ==
=== Musical ===
Musical performances
Year	Title		Role	Theater	Ref.
Year	English	Korean	Role	Theater	Ref.
2011	Street Life (Run To You)	스트릿 라이프 (런투유)	Jeong Hoon		
2012	National Singing Contest the Musical	전국노래자랑	Michael Lee		
2012	Street Life (Run To You)	스트릿 라이프 (런투유)	Jeong Hoon		
2013	High School Musical	하이 스쿨 뮤지컬	Chad Danforth		
2014	Street Life (Run To You)	스트릿 라이프 (런투유)	Jeong Hoon		
2014	Kinky Boots	킹키부츠	Lola		
2015	Death Note	데스노트	Ryuk		
2015	The Moonlight Fairy and the Girl	달빛요정과 소녀	Moonlight Fairy		
2016	Dracula	드라큘라	Van Helsing		
2016	Kinky Boots	킹키부츠	Lola		
2017	Death Note	데스노트	Ryuk		
2017	Napoleon	나폴레옹	Talleyrand		
2017	Hourglass	모래시계	Lee Jong Do		
2018	Elisabeth	엘리자벳	Luigi Lucheni		
2019	King Arthur	킹아더	Maleagant		
2019	City of Angels	시티 오브 엔젤	Stine		
2020	Kinky Boots	킹키부츠	Lola		
2021	Hadestown	하데스타운	Hermes		
2022	Death Note	데스노트	Ryuk		
2022	Kinky Boots	킹키부츠	Lola		

== Awards and nominations ==
Name of the award ceremony, year presented, category, nominee of the award, and the result of the nomination
Award ceremony	Year	Category	Nominee / Work	Result	Ref.
Daegu International Musical Festival (DIMF) Awards	2022	Star of the Year	Hadestown	Won	
Korea Musical Awards	2023	Best Supporting Actor	Death Note	Won	
