= The Great Flood (film) =

2025 film by Kim Byung-woo

- Release poster
- Hangul: 대홍수
- RR: Daehongsu
- MR: Taehongsu
- Directed by: Kim Byung-woo
- Written by: Kim Byung-woo; Han Ji-su
- Produced by: Kim Kyung-min
- Starring: Kim Da-mi; Park Hae-soo
- Cinematography: Kim Tae-soo
- Edited by: Park Min-seon; Kim Chang-ju
- Music by: Lee Jun-oh
- Production company: Hwansang Studios
- Distributed by: Netflix
- Release dates: September 18, 2025 (BIFF); December 19, 2025 (Netflix)
- Running time: 108 minutes
- Country: South Korea
- Language: Korean

The Great Flood (Korean: 대홍수) is a 2025 South Korean science fiction disaster film co-written and directed by Kim Byung-woo. Starring Kim Da-mi and Park Hae-soo, the film depicts a mother and son struggling to survive after a tsunami floods their apartment building.

The Great Flood had its world premiere at the 30th Busan International Film Festival in the Korean Cinema Today - Special Premiere section on September 18, 2025. It was released globally on Netflix on December 19, 2025.

== Plot ==
An-na, an AI researcher and recent widow, wakes in her apartment to find floodwater rising in the thirty-floor complex. With her six-year-old son Ja-in, she attempts to reach the roof and receives a call from United Nations officials, who inform her that agents are en route to extract her and Ja-in by helicopter. She is saved from a tsunami by an agent named Hee-jo, who reveals that the United Nations had known for years about an asteroid impact at the South Pole that would trigger a global flood and exterminate humanity. Instead of announcing the threat, world governments funded secret efforts to survive, including a space station and research into creating engineered human bodies and consciousness. An-na's employer is also revealed to be involved in these projects. She gets flashbacks to when her husband got into a car accident and the car was submerged in the ocean. An-na tries to escape with Ja-in and her husband before they die, but her husband's lower limbs get crushed by the weight of the car, making escaping difficult for him. He knows death is imminent so he tells An-na to leave. They share a sorrowful hug and farewell, then An-na escapes with Ja-in.

Another tsunami separates An-na from Ja-in, and she swims back into the flooding building. She hears a trapped girl in an elevator but is unable to free her before the water forces her to continue upward. Upon reaching the roof, a SWAT team seizes Ja-in and extracts his consciousness into a digital storage device, revealing that Ja-in was never biologically born, but is rather an artificial child built from An-na's AI software created to refine advances in synthetic cognition. The SWAT commander states that only An-na and the storage disk will be taken to safety, while everyone else will be left behind; Hee-jo is killed. An-na is transported to a rocket bound for the station in orbit, but debris strikes the vessel, apparently killing those aboard.

An-na suddenly finds herself again in her apartment at the start of the flood. She repeats her escape attempt with Ja-in but is separated from him by a third tsunami and appears to die after colliding with a floating car. She then reawakens in the building with Hee-jo, who has resuscitated her. As they search for Ja-in, An-na once again reaches the elevator, which she manages to open using a broom. The trapped girl, Ji-soo, reports that looters have taken Ja-in hostage. An-na confronts the looters and is nearly killed before Hee-jo intervenes. Ji-soo chooses to remain with her grandparents as the flood rises.

On her phone, An-na discovers thousands of digital paintings sent by Ja-in, each depicting variations of previous timelines. She concludes that the events have happened repeatedly. Hee-jo arranges for SWAT agents to escort An-na to the evacuation point. Now sensing repetitions of prior events, An-na warns that they will kill Hee-jo. A fight breaks out, and An-na and Hee-jo flee through the building. An-na reaches the roof and reunites with Ja-in. Before they can escape, a final tsunami overwhelms them.

It is revealed that only the first timeline occurred in reality. In that version, An-na is mortally injured when the evacuation rocket is struck by debris. She is rescued by a separate spacecraft and requests to have her mind transferred into an AI system. The thousands of subsequent scenarios are simulations of her final hour of life, designed to refine artificial emotional responses by forcing her repeatedly to experience separation from Ja-in. Each simulated timeline ends with their failure or death until the program collects sufficient data. On the space station, the project concludes successfully. Artificial bodies are constructed for An-na and Ja-in, their consciousnesses are installed, and they are permitted to continue life together as mother and son, heading back to the Earth.

== Cast ==
- Kim Da-mi as Gu An-na, an AI researcher at the Darwin Center
- Park Hae-soo as Son Hee-jo, a security operative sent by the Darwin Center to help An-na escape from the apartment
- Kwon Eun-seong as Shin Ja-in, An-na's son
- Jeon Yu-na as Lee Ji-su, a young survivor An-na encounters during the flood
- Park Mi-hyun as An-na's mother
- Jeon Hye-jin as Im Hyeon-mo (special appearance), An-na's senior director at the Darwin Center
- Park Byung-eun as Lee Hwi-so (special appearance), a researcher and head of the Isabella Lab
- Lee Hak-joo as Shin Ga-won (special appearance), An-na's husband

== Production ==
In June 2022, the company Fantasy Light enters into discussions with Netflix about the disaster film The Great Flood by Kim Byung-woo, which would mark the return of actress Kim Da-mi in the lead role.

In August 2022, Netflix confirmed the production of the science fiction disaster film, with the screenplay by Kim Byung-woo and Han Ji-su. Kim Da-mi and Park Hae-soo were confirmed to play lead roles.

Filming started on July 1, 2022, and ended on January 5, 2023.

== Release ==
The Great Flood's world premiere was on September 18, 2025 in the 'Korean Cinema Today - Special Premiere' section of the 30th Busan International Film Festival.

Streaming started on Netflix on December 19, 2025.

== Reception ==
=== Critical response ===
On the review aggregator website Rotten Tomatoes, 60% of 25 critics' reviews are positive, with an average rating of 6.2/10.

=== Viewership ===
The film was listed in Netflix's Top 10 Non-English Films for seven weeks. In addition to its weekly performance, The Great Flood ranked among Netflix’s most popular non-English films of all time, placing fifth with approximately 83.7 million views within its first 91 days of release.

The Great Flood viewership per Netflix
Week	Date	Global Rank (Non-English films)	Views	Ref.
1	December 15, 2025—December 21, 2025	1st	27,900,000	
2	December 22, 2025—December 28, 2025	1st	33,100,000	
3	December 29, 2025—January 4, 2026	1st	11,100,000	
4	January 5, 2026—January 11, 2026	1st	5,200,000	
5	January 12, 2026—January 18, 2026	2nd	2,500,000	
6	January 19, 2026—January 25, 2026	4th	1,400,000	
7	January 26, 2026—February 1, 2026	10th	1,000,000	
