= Crash (South Korean TV series) =

2024 South Korean television series

- Hangul: 크래시
- RR: Keuraesi
- MR: K'ŭraesi
- Genre: Crime; Comedy; Police procedural; Action
- Written by: Oh Su-jin
- Directed by: Park Joon-woo
- Starring: Lee Min-ki; Kwak Sun-young; Heo Sung-tae; Lee Ho-chul; Moonhee; Park Ji-sung
- Music by: Kim Sung-yeol
- Country of origin: South Korea
- Original language: Korean
- No. of seasons: 2
- No. of episodes: 14

Production
- Executive producers: Lee Sang-baek; Choi Han-gyeol
- Producers: Kim Eun-seon; Yoon Chang-woo
- Cinematography: Hong Il-seom; Han Sang-wook
- Editor: Na Hee-soo
- Running time: 60 minutes
- Production company: AStory

Original release
- Network: ENA
- Release: May 13, 2024 – present

Crash (Korean: 크래시) is an ongoing South Korean comedy crime police procedural television series written by Oh Su-jin and directed by Park Joon-woo. The series centers on the Traffic Crime Investigation (TCI) Team at Seoul Namgang Police Station, consisting of Cha Yeon-ho (Lee Min-ki), Min So-hee (Kwak Sun-young), Jung Chae-man (Heo Sung-tae), Woo Dong-gi (Lee Ho-chul), Eo Hyun-kyung (Moonhee), and Ji Dae-se (Park Ji-sung), as they investigate various vehicular crimes and systemic corruption.

Produced by AStory with planning by KT Studio Genie, the first season aired on ENA from May 13, to June 18, 2024, and is available for streaming on Disney+ and Hulu. The series received generally positive reviews from critics for its action sequences and premise, and concluded its run with a 6.6% nationwide viewership rating. The second season premiered on November 16, 2026.

== Premise ==
In Season 1, the Traffic Crime Investigation (TCI) Team is established at Seoul Namgang Police Station by veteran detective Jung Chae-man, bringing together a group of overlooked outsiders: Cha Yeon-oh, Min So-hee, Woo Dong-gi, and Eo Hyun-kyung. Operating under unconventional methods and tight-knit teamwork, the team exposes systemic corruption and dangerous criminals operating on the roads. By the end of the first season, the unit transitions from a local division to the National Office of Investigation (NOI) under the National Police Agency.

In the second season, the core TCI team returns alongside a new recruit, rookie constable Ji Dae-se, to handle larger-scale, highly sophisticated nationwide traffic and major crimes, utilizing heightened investigative techniques and intensified vehicular action sequences.

== Cast and characters ==
=== Main ===
- Lee Min-ki as Cha Yeon-ho

Inspector of Traffic Crime Investigation (TCI) Team at Seoul Namgang Police Station. A gifted individual who graduated early from science high school and entered the mathematics department at KAIST as top of his class, he lacks social awareness and situational tact, often commuting to crime scenes on a bicycle. However, using his mathematical ability to determine accident causes and his exceptional meticulousness, he gradually becomes an indispensable asset to TCI. Armed with an IQ of 158, an ability to mentally simulate incidents to determine causes mathematically, and extreme persistence that leaves no small clue unchecked, he forms the brain of the team. Having solved numerous cases after joining T.C.I., he has earned the deep trust of his colleagues.

- Kwak Sun-young as Min So-hee
  - Han So-hee as young Min So-hee

Lieutenant and ace of TCI team at Seoul Namgang Police Station. Possessing relentless tenacity and an unyielding will, she never lets go once she bites onto a case. Combined with innate quick reflexes, practical martial arts skills, and expert driving ability that handles cars like toys, she strips criminals of any will to escape. While Yeon-ho serves as the brain of TCI, So-hee serves as its brawn. Driven by a fierce competitive spirit and stubborn determination to overcome any obstacle, she resolves every case assigned to her no matter what.

- Heo Sung-tae as Jung Chae-man

Senior inspector and captain of the TCI Team at Seoul Namgang Police Station. The mastermind who carefully selected hidden gems to forge TCI into a diamond-hard, powerful unit. Serving as a reliable pillar of support for the frequently marginalized team, he always takes a step back to anchor the group and help his members fully showcase their abilities. He carries a personal sorrow, having lost his wife to a hit-and-run accident in the past.

- Lee Ho-chul as Woo Dong-gi

Police sergeant and detective of TCI Team at Seoul Namgang Police Station. An analyst of traffic crimes who excels in CCTV and data analysis through extraordinary observation and meticulousness. He can instantly identify a vehicle's model and modifications simply by its silhouette and engine sound. Despite his fierce, rough-around-the-edges appearance resembling a violent offender, he is gentle and timid enough not to harm even a single bug.

- Moonhee as Eo Hyun-kyung

Police constable and detective of TCI Team at Seoul Namgang Police Station. The youngest member and unofficial radar of TCI, she showcases brilliant martial arts skills against criminals using various disciplines such as taekwondo, judo, and boxing learned from a young age. She became a member of TCI at the call of So-hee, who was her mentor back in the Traffic Investigation Division. Though she strictly hides the fact that her mother is the head of the National Office of Investigation, high-level insider information occasionally slips out unintentionally, drawing suspicion from her colleagues regarding her background.

- Park Ji-sung as Ji Dae-se (season 2)

The traffic department's idol, endowed with tall stature, warm visuals, and a charming eye-smile as the finishing touch. Having frequented martial arts dojos for taekwondo and hapkido since childhood, he excels in physical tasks. Though he is always bright and easygoing, he harbors an inner pain stemming from the death of his mother, a police officer who died in the line of duty over a decade ago.

=== Supporting ===
- Heo Jung-do as Pyo Myung-hak

Superintendent of the Seoul Metropolitan Police Agency. Astute and ambitious with a clear sense of allies and rivals, fiercely loyal to his own people while leveraging manufactured difficult situations to create weaknesses and build factions. He plans to transition into politics via party nomination after wrapping up his police career.

- Kang Ki-doong as Pyo Jung-wook

Myung-hak's son and the head of YSC Construction. Quick-witted, excelling in play, studies, and delinquency alike, having learned the law of the jungle from his father. Though rebellious and trouble-prone, he deeply fears and cannot defy his father.

- Oh Eui-shik as Lee Tae-joo

Head of the Major Crimes Investigation Division at National Police Agency. Driven by career ambition and willing to justify any means to achieve goals. While rising through the ranks assisting Myung-hak, he returns to Seoul Namgang Police Station as joint investigation headquarters head, reuniting with his ex-girlfriend So-hee and attempting to bring her to headquarters despite her cold demeanor.

- Lee Yoo-jun as Yang Seok-chan

CEO of YSC Group. A former organized crime figure who once dominated Daejeon, currently serving as the head of a conglomerate with numerous subsidiaries.

- Heo Ji-won as Yang Jae-young

Seok-chan's son and the witness of a traffic accident way back 2014.

- Han Sang-jo as Han Kyung-soo

A truck driver and a former friend of Jung-wook and Jae-young.

- Baek Hyun-jin as Gu Kyung-mo

Chief of Seoul Namgang Police Station. Constantly looking for opportunities to undermine Chae-man and TCI, yet shrinking in authority before Chae-man, his senior from the police academy.

- Yang Jo-a as Yeom Bo-yeon

Superintendent of Seoul Namgang Police Station.

- Oh Dae-seok as Seo Byung-gil

Captain of Criminal Division at Seoul Namgang Police Station.

- Kim Gwang-sik as Go Jae-deok

Captain of the Investigation Division at Seoul Namgang Police Station.

- Yoo Seung-mok as Min Yong-geon

So-hee's father, who is a veteran taxi driver with 30 years of accident-free experience, he uses his vast personal network to help his daughter's investigation.

- Ha Seong-gwang as Lee Jung-seop

Hyun-soo's father who is a former detective.

- Lee Do-gun as Jo Seok-tae

Head of an illegal used car dealership and create tension by taking a stand against TCI.

- Bae Yoo-ram as Jang Ho-kyu

A serial killer who targeted vulnerable, elderly victims lacking family support to secure criminal settlement funds.

- Jo Eui-jin as Song Ji-man

Ho-kyu's accomplice who stage the murder of his own mother to collect her death insurance.

- Park Ji-ah as Park Hyun-jung

Team leader at KM Non-Life Insurance who was bribed by Ho-kyu and Ji-man, and turned a blind eye to the insurance fraud.

- Tae Hang-ho as Kang Chang-seok

CEO of CY Logistics.

- Ko Dong-eop as Seo Young-chul

A truck driver who took full responsibility for accidents caused by illegally modifying and overloading trucks.

- Yang Byung-yeol as Seo Dong-woo

Young-chul's son who is also truck driver.

- Joo Hyun as Woo Gil-soon

Dong-gi's father who is a truck driver.

=== Special appearances ===
- Shim So-young as a bulgogi restaurant owner
- Lee Kyu-won as a narrator
- Lee Na-eun as Kim Min-ju

A victim.

- Kim Do-yeon as Im Ji-suk

President of the Dongpo-ri Women's Association and an accomplice in the disappearance of high school student Seung-ah.

== Episodes ==
Season	Title	Episodes	Originally released	
Season	Title	Episodes	First released	Last released
1	—	12	May 13, 2024	June 18, 2024
2	Fury Road	12	November 16, 2026	TBA

=== Season 1 (2024) ===
No. overall	No. in season	Original release date	South Korea viewers (millions)
1	1	May 13, 2024	0.5
2	2	May 14, 2024	0.7
3	3	May 20, 2024	0.9
4	4	May 21, 2024	1.0
5	5	May 27, 2024	1.0
6	6	May 28, 2024	1.1
7	7	June 3, 2024	1.2
8	8	June 4, 2024	1.3
9	9	June 10, 2024	1.2
10	10	June 11, 2024	1.4
11	11	June 17, 2024	1.2
12	12	June 18, 2024	1.5

=== Season 2: Fury Road (2026) ===
No. overall	No. in season	Original release date	South Korea viewers (millions)
13	1	November 16, 2026	0.6
14	2	November 17, 2026	0.8
15	3	November 23, 2026	TBD
16	4	November 24, 2026	TBD
17	5	November 30, 2026	TBD
18	6	December 1, 2026	TBD
19	7	December 7, 2026	TBD
20	8	December 8, 2026	TBD
21	9	December 14, 2026	TBD
22	10	December 15, 2026	TBD
23	11	December 21, 2026	TBD
24	12	December 22, 2026	TBD

== Production ==
=== Development ===
Season 1

The series is directed by Park Joon-woo, who helmed Doctor Detective (2019) and the first season of Taxi Driver (2021), and written by Oh Su-jin with a targeted schedule in the first half of 2024. It is planned by KT Studio Genie and produced by AStory.

In an interview with director Park and writer Oh on May 28, 2024, they discussed the show's development, which was grounded in real-world South Korean traffic crime statistics reflecting 241,029 recorded cases in 2022. Conceived following a conversation between Oh and writer Kim Eun-hee, the series aimed to provide hyper-realistic social commentary through a dedicated Traffic Crime Investigation (TCI) team. Park utilized these insights alongside consultations with real investigators to shape the narrative. The opening serial elderly murder plotline was adapted closely from actual events, while other potential topics—such as sudden unintended acceleration incidents—were omitted from the initial season due to logistical constraints.

Season 2

Following the commercial and critical success of the first season, AStory officially announced the production of a second season titled Crash 2: Fury Road (Korean: 크래시2 : 분노의 도로; RR: Keuraesi2 : bunnoui doro), scheduled to air in the second half of 2026.

=== Casting ===
Season 1

In 2023, Lee Min-ki was reportedly considering to lead ENA's comedy crime police procedural series. Later, Kwak Sun-young and Heo Sung-tae were reportedly cast. In January 2024, the principal cast lineup were complete with the addition of Lee Ho-chul and Moonhee. Between March and May 2024, additional casting for supporting roles were confirmed including Baek Hyun-jin, Oh Eui-shik, Lee Do-gun, and Yoo Seung-mok.

Season 2

In January 2026, Park Ji-sung was reported to join the series with principal photography began next month. Later, it was confirmed that the main cast would reprise their roles along with the addition of Park. Oh Eui-shik was also confirmed to reprise his role.

== Release ==
The first season of Crash was scheduled for a May 2024 broadcast, occupying the Monday and Tuesday timeslot. Later, ENA confirmed the series' premiere to be on May 13, at 22:00 (KST). The second season is scheduled to premiere on November 16, 2026, in the same timeslot.

It is also available for streaming internationally on Disney+ and Hulu (for season 1).

== Reception ==
=== Critical response ===
Professional ratings
Review scores
Source	Rating
South China Morning Post	3/5 stars
The Review Geek	8.5/10

Crash received generally positive reviews from critics and audiences for its unique premise, high-energy action sequences, and ensemble cast dynamics. In an early review, Sports Chosun praised the series for its integration of real-world-inspired cases—such as the towing and rental car cartel investigation in the third episode—highlighting the satisfying team synergy, comedic beats, and the growing intrigue surrounding protagonist Cha Yeon-ho's past trauma. Writing for the South China Morning Post, reviewer Pierce Conran gave the series a mixed-to-positive assessment, commending its entertaining action-crime procedural elements, strong lead camaraderie, and impressive vehicular chase sequences. However, the review offered critique regarding the narrative structure, noting that the overarching plot became overly reliant on coincidences tying back to the primary antagonist, and that the standalone island investigation in the final episodes felt somewhat disconnected from the broader serialized conspiracy.

=== Viewership ===
Crash premiered on ENA on May 13, 2024, recording an initial nationwide viewership rating of 2.2%, which surpassed its predecessor The Midnight Studio to establish a network record for a Monday-Tuesday drama premiere. Benefiting from positive word-of-mouth reception, availability on streaming platforms, and audience accessibility, the series experienced consistent viewership growth throughout its broadcast. It set new personal ratings highs across consecutive weeks to lead its time slot. The final episode, broadcast on June 18, 2024, achieved a nationwide rating of 6.6%, ranking as the second-highest viewership rating recorded for an ENA television series.

Crash : South Korea viewers per episode (thousands)

Season	Episode number												Average
Season	1	2	3	4	5	6	7	8	9	10	11	12	Average
1	453	730	862	972	911	1129	1162	1265	1166	1375	1218	1472	1060
2	621	822	TBD	TBD	TBD	TBD	TBD	TBD	TBD	TBD	TBD	TBD	TBD

Source: Audience measurement performed nationwide by Nielsen Korea.

Average TV viewership ratings (season 1)
Ep.	Original broadcast date	Average audience share (Nielsen Korea)	
Ep.	Original broadcast date	Nationwide	Seoul
1	May 13, 2024	2.232% (2nd)	2.640% (2nd)
2	May 14, 2024	3.039% (2nd)	3.016% (2nd)
3	May 20, 2024	3.801% (2nd)	4.087% (2nd)
4	May 21, 2024	4.084% (2nd)	4.197% (2nd)
5	May 27, 2024	4.116% (2nd)	4.340% (2nd)
6	May 28, 2024	5.035% (2nd)	5.269% (2nd)
7	June 3, 2024	5.076% (1st)	5.382% (1st)
8	June 4, 2024	5.870% (1st)	6.167% (1st)
9	June 10, 2024	5.427% (1st)	5.685% (1st)
10	June 12, 2024	6.300% (1st)	6.572% (1st)
11	June 17, 2024	5.454% (1st)	5.518% (1st)
12	June 18, 2024	6.619% (1st)	6.943% (1st)
Average		4.754%	4.985%
In the table above, the blue numbers represent the lowest ratings and the red numbers represent the highest ratings.; This drama aired on a cable channel/pay TV which normally has a relatively smaller audience compared to free-to-air TV/public broadcasters (KBS, SBS, MBC, and EBS).

Average TV viewership ratings (season 2)
Ep.	Original broadcast date	Average audience share (Nielsen Korea)	
Ep.	Original broadcast date	Nationwide	Seoul
1	November 16, 2026	2.8% (2nd)	2.4% (2nd)
2	November 17, 2026	3.7% (2nd)	3.1% (2nd)
3	November 23, 2026		
4	November 24, 2026		
5	November 30, 2026		
6	December 1, 2026		
7	December 7, 2026		
8	December 8, 2026		
9	December 14, 2026		
10	December 15, 2026		
11	December 21, 2026		
12	December 22, 2026		
In the table above, the blue numbers represent the lowest ratings and the red numbers represent the highest ratings.; This drama airs on a cable channel/pay TV which normally has a relatively smaller audience compared to free-to-air TV/public broadcasters (KBS, SBS, MBC, and EBS).
