= Yoo Seung-mok =

South Korean actor (born 1969)

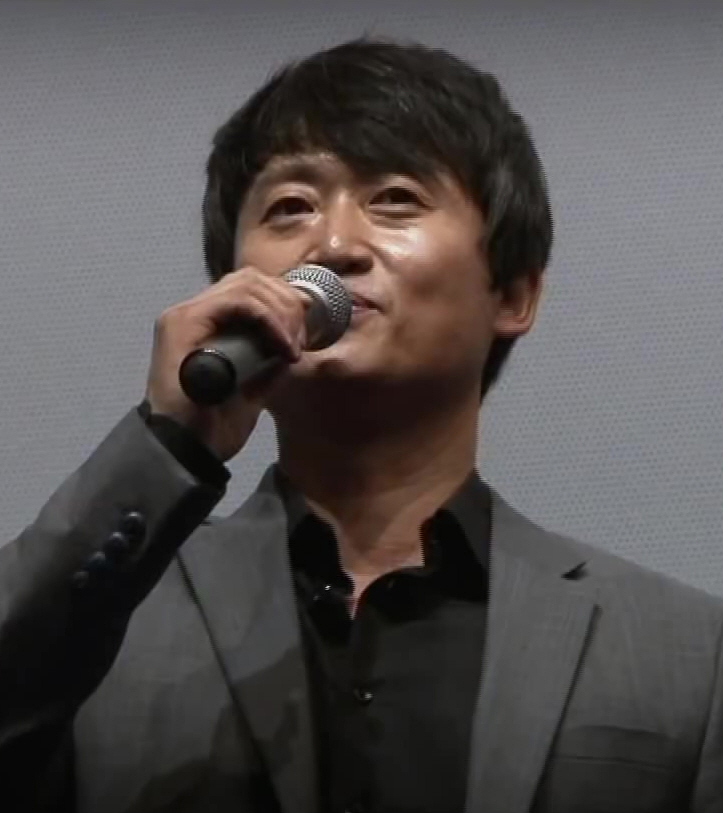
- Yoo in 2014
- Born: September 14, 1969 (age 57); South Korea
- Other name: Yu Seung-mok
- Occupation: Actor
- Employer(s): SM C&C

Korean name
- Hangul: 유승목
- RR: Yu Seungmok
- MR: Yu Sŭngmok

Yoo Seung-mok (Korean: 유승목; born September 14, 1969) is a South Korean film, television, and theater actor.

== Biography ==
He studied at Dankook University.

== Career ==
He is a member of the agency Studio Santa Claus Entertainment, previously known as Huayi Brothers Korea.

In March 2016, he joined the recurring cast of the series Pied Piper, where he played Gong Ji-man, the leader of the crisis negotiation team. On December 7 of the same year, he appeared in the film Pandora as Kam Shi, one of the bosses who suspects something is wrong.

In August 2018, he joined the recurring cast of the series Voice 2 as detective Na Hong-soo, a member of the Poongsan police dispatch team.

On April 5, 2019, he made a guest appearance in the series The Fiery Priest, where he played gambler Oh Kwang-du. In May of the same year, he joined the recurring cast of Voice 3, reprising his role as Na Hong-soo, head of the violent crimes unit at Poongsan police.

In April 2021, he joined the recurring cast of Taxi Driver as Jo Jin-woo, a member of the Seoul Northern District Prosecutors' Office.

== Filmography ==
=== Film ===
Year	Title	Role	Ref.
2000	Peppermint Candy	Detective	
2002	L'Abri	–	
2003	Memories of Murder	Detective Koo Hee-bong	
2005	Antarctic Journal	Kim Min-jae	
2006	No Mercy for the Rude	Jin Hwan	
2007	Paradise Murdered	Sergeant Kim	
2010	Moss	Inspector Oh	
2012	National Security	–	
2014	Sea Fog	Seok-tae	
2016	Pandora	Kam Shi	
2021	Pipeline	Chief Na Choon-shik	
2021	Miracle: Letters to the President	Driver Park	
2021	Spiritwalker	Mr. Lee	
2022	Decision to Leave	Ki Do-soo	
2023	Ransomed	Vice Minister Lee Sang-ok	
2023	The Devil's Deal	Ahn Gyu-hwan	
2024	Don't Touch Dirty Money	Chief Kwak	
2025	Lobby	Manager	

=== Television series ===
Year	Title	Role	Ref.
2002	Rustic Period	–	
2003	Age of Warriors	–	
2003	All In	–	
2004	Immortal Admiral Yi Sun-sin	–	
2006	Special Crime Investigation: Murder in the Blue House	–	
2007	By My Side	–	
2008	Iljimae	–	
2009	Cain and Abel	–	
2010	Comrades	–	
2011	Brain	–	
2012	God of War	–	
2013	The Blade and Petal	–	
2014	Dr. Frost	Kim Dae-shik	
2016	Pied Piper	Gong Ji-man	
2017	Whisper	–	
2018	Voice 2	Na Hong-soo	
2019	The Fiery Priest	Oh Kwang-du	
2019	Voice 3	Na Hong-soo	
2021	Taxi Driver	Jo Jin-woo	
2021	So I Married an Anti-Fan	Director (commercial)	
2022	Kiss Sixth Sense	Morpheus Director	
2022	Shadow Detective	Bae Young-doo	
2023	Taxi Driver 2	Jo Jin-woo	
2023	Moving	Jo Rae-hyuk	
2023–2024	A Good Day to Be a Dog	Vice Principal	
2024	Chicken Nugget	Dr. Yoo In-won	
2024	The Bequeathed	Choi Tae-seong	
2024	Crash	Min Yong-geon	
2024	Family Matters	Jo Hae-pal	
2025	The Potato Lab	Bu Jae-jung	
2025	Hyperknife	Yang Dong-young	
2025	The Dream Life of Mr. Kim	Baek Jeong-tae	

== Awards and nominations ==
Name of the award ceremony, year presented, category, nominee of the award, and the result of the nomination
Award ceremony	Year	Category	Nominee / Work	Result	Ref.
Baeksang Arts Awards	2026	Best Supporting Actor – Television	The Dream Life of Mr. Kim	Won	
