= College of Engineering, Ewha Womans University =

College in Seoul, South Korea

College of Engineering at Ewha Womans University
- Engineering A/B Buildings at Ewha
- Established: 1996
- Affiliations: Ewha Womans University
- Dean: Kwang-Ok Kim
- Faculty: 54 (Apr. 2010)
- Undergraduates: 1,097 (Apr. 2010)
- Postgraduates: 138 (Apr. 2010)
- Location: Seoul, South Korea; 37°33′59.14″N 126°56′54.08″E
- Campus: 11-1 Daehyun-dong, Seodaemun-gu, Seoul, 120-750, Korea

The College of Engineering at Ewha Womans University is one of eleven major academic divisions. Established in 1996, it comprises four departments: Computer Science, Electronics Engineering, Environmental Science, and Architecture. The college offers Bachelor of Science (B.S.), Master of Science (M.S.), and Doctor of Philosophy (Ph.D.) degrees.

== History ==
The College of Engineering at Ewha Womans University was established in 1996 as the world's first women's college of engineering. Approximately 1,100 undergraduate and 120 graduate students study at the college under three divisions:

- Division of Computer & Electronics Engineering
- Division of Architecture
- Division of Environmental & Food Science

=== 1980s ===
- 1981: The Department of Computer Science was founded within the College of Liberal Arts and Sciences.

=== 1990s ===
- 1993: The Department of Environmental Science was founded within the College of Natural Science.
- 1994: The Department of Electronics Engineering and the Department of Architecture were founded within the College of Natural Science.
- 1996:
  - Dean Ki-Ho Lee took office as the first dean.
  - The College of Engineering was officially founded, incorporating four departments: Computer Science, Electronics Engineering, Environmental Science, and Architecture.
  - The Department of Environmental Science was renamed the Department of Environmental Science & Engineering.
- 1997: Dean Yoon-Kyoo Jhee took office as the second dean.
- 1998: The Department of Computer Science was renamed the Department of Computer Science & Engineering.
- 1999:
  - Dean Yeoung-Soo Shin took office as the third dean.
  - The College of Engineering was reorganized into two divisions: Computer Science & Electronics Engineering and Architecture & Environmental System Engineering.

=== 2000s ===
- 2000:
  - The Department of Electronics Engineering was renamed the Department of Information Electronics Engineering. The Department of Environmental Science & Engineering was renamed the Environmental Science & Engineering Major School.
  - The college system was reorganized.
- 2001: Dean Seung Soo Park took office as the fourth dean.
- 2003: Dean Yeoung-Soo Shin took office as the fifth dean.
- 2005: Dean Yeoung-Soo Shin took office as the sixth dean.
- 2006:
  - The college system was reorganized.
  - The College of Engineering was restructured into three divisions: Computer Information Communication, Architecture, and Environmental & Food Technology.
  - The Department of Computer Science & Engineering and the Department of Information Electronics Engineering merged into the Department of Computer Information Communication Engineering.
  - The Department of Architecture was divided into two majors: Architectural Design and Architectural Engineering.
  - The Department of Environmental Science & Engineering and the Department of Food Science & Technology were merged into the Division of Environmental and Food Technology.
  - The Accreditation Program for Engineering Education was introduced.
- 2007:
  - Dean Myoung-Hee Kim took office as the seventh dean.
  - The Division of Computer Information Communication Engineering was renamed the Division of Information Communication Engineering and was divided into two majors: Computer Science & Engineering Major and Information Electronics Major.
- 2008:
  - The Division of Information Communication Engineering was renamed the Division of Computer Information Communication.
  - The Computer Science & Engineering Major was renamed the Computer Engineering Major.
  - The Information Electronics Major was renamed the Electronics Engineering Major.
- 2009: Dean Sang-Ho Lee took office as the eighth dean.
- 2011: Dean Kwang-Ok Kim took office as the ninth dean.

== Academics ==
Division of Computer and Electronics Engineering

=== Department of Computer Science and Engineering ===
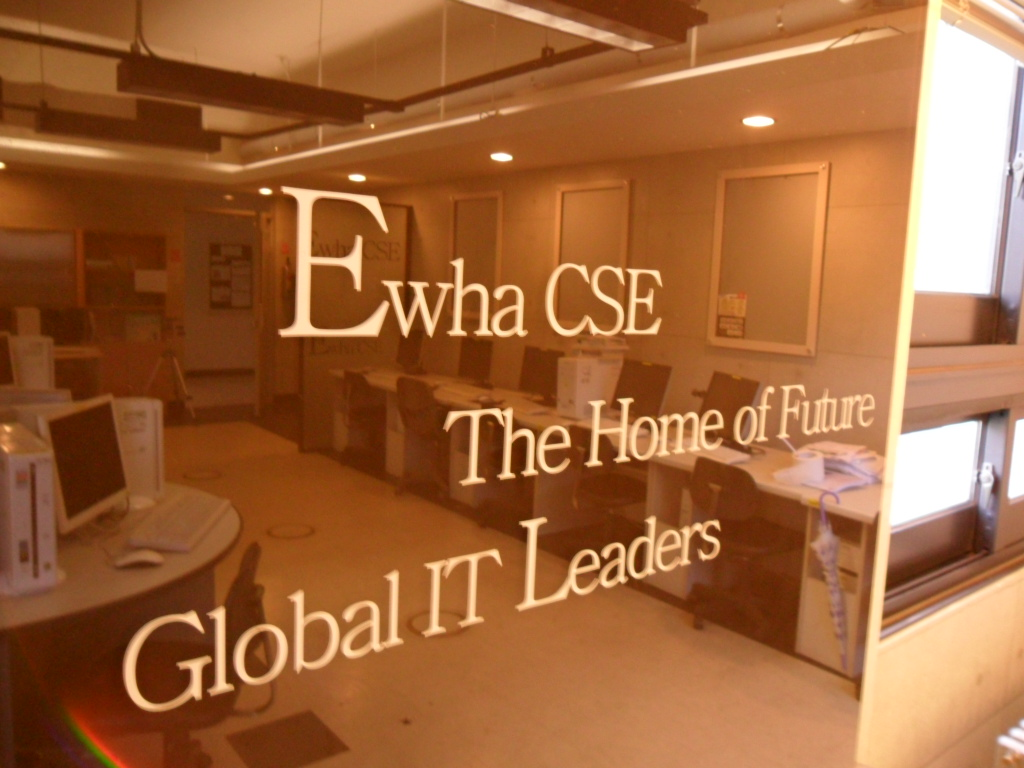
Ewha CSE

== Division of Architecture ==
The Division of Architecture was founded in 1994 within the College of Natural Sciences as the Department of Architecture. The field of architecture encompasses modern design environments, including museums, skyscrapers, residential buildings, concert halls, schools, and offices.

Until 2005, the Department of Architecture was part of the College of Engineering. In 2006, it was expanded into the Division of Architecture, becoming an independent division. The division consists of two majors:

- Architecture Major – Focuses on design and planning.
- Architectural Engineering Major – Covers core engineering disciplines, including structural engineering, environmental technology, and construction management.

=== Department of Architecture ===
The curriculum is structured around five key areas:

- Architectural Design – The core of the program.
- Communication – Utilization of various media for architectural expression.
- Cultural Context – Study of art, history, urban environments, and sustainability.
- Practical Affairs – Knowledge of building codes, ethics, and professional practice.
- Technologies – Engineering knowledge related to architectural design.

=== Department of Architectural Engineering ===
The Department of Architectural Engineering offers a four-year engineering education accreditation program, with coursework divided into the following areas:

- Building Structure – Design and sustainability of structures, including fire safety, green technology, retrofitting, and structural safety.
- Biomechanical Engineering – Focus on heart valve safety evaluation and fatigue analysis of bio-composites.
- Building Environment Planning & Energy-Efficient Systems – Development of low-carbon, energy-efficient green buildings.
- Building Performance Simulation – Simulation validation, testing, commissioning support, and monitoring.
- Government Policy for Energy-Efficient Green Buildings – Includes design guidelines for energy efficiency, green building certification, and rating systems.
- Construction Management – Covers financial and operational aspects of construction projects.
- Building Materials – Study of physical and mechanical properties of materials such as concrete, stone, wood, and glass.

=== Graduate program ===
The graduate program actively engages in research and projects in various fields, including:

- Structural repair and reinforcement
- Structural damage prediction
- Fire-resistant technology
- Energy-saving building solutions
- Insulation technology
- Radiant cooling and heating systems
- Construction management technology

== Division of Environmental and Food Science ==
The Division of Environmental and Food Science comprises the Department of Environmental Science & Engineering and the Department of Food Science & Engineering. This interdisciplinary field integrates nature, technology, and human well-being.

Environmental science focuses on protecting nature as a means of preserving life, while food science and engineering is an applied discipline that combines traditional food technology with advanced innovations to support the future of the food industry.

=== Department of Environmental Science and Engineering ===
The Department of Environmental Science & Engineering conducts research and projects in the following areas:

- Environmental management
- Policies
- Information System Monitoring
- Environmental Impact Assessment
- Media Environment
- Low-carbon Green Growth

== Accreditation Board for Engineering Education of Korea ==
The Accreditation Board for Engineering Education of Korea (ABEEK) oversees a quality assurance program for engineering education in South Korea. The College of Engineering introduced its engineering education accreditation program in 2005 and established the Center for Innovation in Engineering Education in 2006.

== Research institutes ==
The College of Engineering at Ewha Womans University conducts research through its various research institutes.

- Severe Storm Research Center – Established to minimize damage from meteorological disasters by improving the accuracy of weather forecasts.
- Center for Climate and Environmental Change Prediction Research – Supports government and industry efforts to develop strategies for responding to medium- to long-term climate change by providing predictions of climate-driven environmental and ecosystem changes.
- Center for Computer Graphics and Virtual Reality – Founded in 1999 to research and develop future core technologies in computer graphics and virtual reality.
- Environmental Research Institute – Established in 1971 to address environmental issues caused by industrialization, urbanization, and population growth, bringing together researchers from within Ewha.
- Embedded Software Research Center – Focuses on embedded software research aligned with industrial demand and aims to train professional women engineers specializing in this field.

== Government-funded medium-to-large scale research projects ==
The College of Engineering at Ewha Womans University is actively engaged in several government-funded medium-to-large scale research projects.

- BK21 Project – A human resource development initiative that supports master’s, doctoral, and postdoctoral researchers. The project consists of three core research teams and provides 200 to 250 million KRW in annual research funding.
- National Research Laboratory (NRL) Project – Aims to enhance research capabilities in core fundamental technologies identified as strategic national priorities. Under this program, two research laboratories in the Department of Environmental Science & Engineering receive 200 million KRW annually.
  - Since being designated as an Engineering Research Center by the National Research Foundation in 2009, the Center for Climate and Environmental Change Prediction Research has been developing an integrated prediction system that considers interactions among climate, environment, and ecosystems. This research center receives approximately 1.2 billion KRW annually.
- IT Original Technology Development Program – Focuses on computer-based animation technologies, including virtual entertainment content such as computer games and film special effects. From 2008 to 2013, this project received 1 billion KRW annually in research funding.

== Exchange students program ==
Ewha Womans University offers the International Exchange and Study Abroad Program for exchange and visiting students. This program is designed for students interested in a wide range of academic fields, including Asian and Korean studies, and is open to both undergraduate and graduate students from accredited institutions worldwide.

Participants may study at Ewha for one or two semesters as non-degree-seeking students. International students enrolled in the program can register for courses offered in either English or Korean, depending on their language proficiency.

== Location ==
The College of Engineering is situated on the main campus of Ewha Womans University in Seoul, South Korea.

Address:

52 Ewhayeodae-gil, Seodaemun-gu, Seoul, South Korea

Plus Code:

HW6W+PP, Seoul, South Korea
