= 2025–26 South Korea network television schedule =

Television schedule for the South Korea from July 2025

The 2025–26 network television schedule for the South Korea Major broadcast networks in the South Korea will cover the prime time hours from July 2025 to June 2026. The schedule is followed by a list per network.

Unlike the North American television season which typically begins in September, the South Korean broadcasting industry increasingly centers its major programming shifts around the second half of the year. In accordance with the Broadcasting Act of South Korea, major broadcast networks are required to maintain specific programming ratios (such as local content, animations, and specialized genres) which are evaluated on a semi-annual (half-yearly) basis. This regulatory cycle aligns with the industry's shift toward July-to-June seasonal planning.

TV Chosun was the first to announce its initial fall schedule on Aug 29, 2025 via press release (without an upfront presentation), followed by tvN and SBS also decided to resume Wednesday-Thursday dramas, and the fall programming was released.

Channel A released the first half of 2026 on December 17.

EBS is not included, Because it consists mainly of documentaries, travel programs, and overseas documentaries. MBN are also not included It was excluded because there are many home shopping tie-in program. The broadcaster aired a branded content program in partnership with a home shopping channel.

== Legend ==
- Light blue indicates local programming.
- Gray indicates encore programming.
- Blue-gray indicates news programming.
- Light green indicates sporting events.
- Red indicates series being burned off and other irregularly scheduled programs, including specials and movies.
- Light gold indicates programming produced outside of the South Korea.
- Bronze indicates reruns of programming that originally aired on a cable channel or streaming service.
- Light yellow indicates the current schedule.

== Schedule ==
- New series to broadcast television are highlighted in **bold**.
- Repeat airings or same-day rebroadcasts are indicated by **(R)**.
- All times are Korea Standard Time

=== Sunday (After 16) ===
Network		3:20 p.m.	4:10 p.m.	4:40 p.m.	5:10 p.m.	5:40 p.m.	6:10 p.m.	7:00 p.m.
SBS		Inkigayo		My Little Old Boy (R)			Running Man	
KBS2	Summer	For Eagle Brothers (R)		Boss in the Mirror			2 Days & 1 Night	
KBS2	Late Summer	Our Golden Days (R)		Boss in the Mirror			2 Days & 1 Night	
KBS2	Late Winter	**Recipe for Love** (R)		Boss in the Mirror			2 Days & 1 Night	
TV Chosun	Fall	Confidence Queen (2:40 p.m., R)	Sing Korea			Original's Show: Current affairs		TV CHOSUN News7
TV Chosun	Mid-Fall	Trot All star (2:40 p.m., R)	Sing Korea			Original's Show: Current affairs		TV CHOSUN News7
TV Chosun	Late Fall	Trot All star (2:40 p.m., R)	Love affair of Diet (3:50 p.m., R)			Original's Show: Current affairs		TV CHOSUN News7
TV Chosun	Mid-Winter	Original's Show: Current affairs (2:40 p.m.)	Golden Friday (R)					TV CHOSUN News7
TV Chosun	Spring	Original's Show: Current affairs (2:40 p.m.)	Doctor Shin (R)			Golden Friday (R)		TV CHOSUN News7
KBS1	Summer	Backpack Travels (R)	Various programming		Animal Kingdom	Open Concert		With Issue Pick Teacher
KBS1	Late Fall	Backpack Travels (R)	Love Across the Sea		Animal Kingdom	Open Concert		With Issue Pick Teacher
KBS1	Spring	Various programming	Woorimal Battle (R)		Animal Kingdom	Open Concert		With Issue Pick Teacher
tvN	Summer	Various programming					Law and the City (6:00 p.m., R)	
tvN	Fall	Various programming					Bon Appétit, Your Majesty (6:00 p.m., R)	
tvN	Late Fall	Various programming					Typhoon Family (6:00 p.m., R)	
tvN	Winter	Various programming					Pro Bono (6:00 p.m., R)	
tvN	Mid-Winter	Various programming					Undercover Miss Hong (6:00 p.m., R)	
tvN	Spring	Various programming					Mad Concrete Dreams (6:00 p.m., R)	
Channel A	Summer	Various programming	Men's Life These Days: Groom's Class (R)			News Top10		News A
Channel A	Fall	My Golden Kids (R)		Amor Body		News Top10		News A
Channel A	Mid-Winter	Various programming	goodlife (R)		News Top10		News A	Chef and a Hunter (7:10 p.m., R)
Channel A	Spring	Various programming	goodlife (R)		News Top10		News A	Groom's Class 2 (7:10 p.m., R)
MBC	Summer	Various programming					King of Mask Singer	
MBC	Winter	Various programming						
ENA		Various programming					Unpredictable (R)	

Notes:

- On weeks when SBS airs a KBO League, all programs broadcast before Running Man are canceled, and only Inkigayo are shifted to 12:30 p.m.
- The broadcast can be canceled due to the 2025 KBO League Post season schedule. KBS 2TV's program was suspended on Oct. 26.
- SBS is scheduled to aired the If You Touch It, Dongne-Mutzip Season 3 on October 11 to 18. at 4:30 p.m.

=== Sunday (After 20) ===
Network		8:00 p.m.	9:00 p.m.	9:30 p.m.	10:00 p.m.	10:30 p.m.	11:00 p.m.	11:30 p.m.	12:00 a.m.
SBS	Fall	SBS 8NEWS	My Little Old Boy				Various programming		
SBS	Winter	SBS 8NEWS	My Little Old Boy				**War of Gang** (11:05 p.m.)		Various programming
SBS	Mid-Winter	SBS 8NEWS	My Little Old Boy				**Call Us Crazy: Women's Baseball** (11:05 p.m.)		Various programming
SBS	Spring	SBS 8NEWS	My Little Old Boy				**Mongle-Mongle Counseling Center** (11:05 p.m.)		
SBS	Mid-Spring	SBS 8NEWS	My Little Old Boy				**Stove League Japan** (11:05 p.m.)		
KBS2	Fall	Our Golden Days		**Walking on Thin Ice** (9:20 p.m.)			Gag Concert (10:45 p.m.)		
KBS2	Mid-fall	Our Golden Days		**Last Summer** (9:20 p.m.)		Gag Concert (10:35 p.m.)			Last Summer (12:05 p.m., R)
KBS2	Winter	Our Golden Days		Gag Concert (9:20 p.m.)			**LOVE : TRACK** (10:50 p.m.)		Various programming
KBS2	Mid-Winter	Our Golden Days		**To My Beloved Thief** (9:20 p.m.)		Gag Concert (10:35 p.m.)			To My Beloved Thief (12:05 p.m., R)
KBS2	Late Winter	**Recipe for Love**		**To My Beloved Thief** (9:20 p.m.)		Gag Concert (10:35 p.m.)			To My Beloved Thief (12:05 p.m., R)
KBS2	Spring	**Recipe for Love**		Gag Concert (9:20 p.m.)			**Chefs of the Gongyanggan** (10:50 p.m.)		**Duet Across the Sea** (11:50 p.m., R)
KBS2	Mid-Spring	**Recipe for Love**		**Neighborhood Baseball** (9:20 p.m.)			Gag Concert		
TV Chosun	Fall	Huh Young-man's Food Travel (7:50 p.m.)	Confidence Queen (R)			**Confidence Queen**			One hit will turn the game around (R)
TV Chosun	Mid-Fall	Huh Young-man's Food Travel (7:50 p.m.)	Various programming						One hit will turn the game around (R)
TV Chosun	Late Fall	Huh Young-man's Food Travel (7:50 p.m.)	No Next Life (8:50 p.m., R)					Trot All star (R)	One hit will turn the game around (R)
TV Chosun	Winter	Huh Young-man's Food Travel (7:50 p.m.)	Miss Trot 4 (8:50 p.m., R)				**My Way in the New Era of Success**		One hit will turn the game around (R)
TV Chosun	Late Winter	Huh Young-man's Food Travel (7:50 p.m.)	**Modern Person History Mr.Lee**			Miss Trot 4 (10:40 p.m., R)			One hit will turn the game around (R)
TV Chosun	Spring	Huh Young-man's Food Travel (7:50 p.m.)	**Modern Person History Mr.Lee**			**Doctor Shin**			One hit will turn the game around (R)
TV Chosun	Late Spring	Huh Young-man's Food Travel (7:50 p.m.)	TBA			Grand Prince, A Man Who Wants to Be King			One hit will turn the game around (R)
KBS1	Fall	Docu ON (8:10 p.m.)	KBS News 9	lifeMOVIE	Various programming (10:10 p.m.)		Back to the Music 2 (10:50 p.m.)		Various programming (11:50 p.m.)
KBS1	Winter	Docu ON (8:10 p.m.)	KBS News 9	Conversations with the Past		View More (10:20 p.m.)	Back to the Music 2		Various programming (11:50 p.m.)
tvN	Fall	House on Wheels (7:40 p.m.)		**Typhoon Family** (9:20 p.m.)			**First Love DOGs**		
tvN	Winter	**Muscle Farmers** (7:40 p.m.)	**Pro Bono** (9:10 p.m.)			Various programming (10:40 p.m.)			
tvN	Late Winter	**Muscle Farmers** (7:40 p.m.)	**Undercover Miss Hong** (9:10 p.m.)			Various programming		**DREAM STAGE**	
tvN	Spring	**After School TaeRi Teacher** (7:40 p.m.)	**Mad Concrete Dreams** (9:10 p.m.)			Various programming		**DREAM STAGE**	
tvN	Late Spring	Youth Over Flowers (7:25 p.m.)	**Filing for Love** (9:10 p.m.)			Youth Over Flowers (R)			
Channel A	Fall	Various programming				Now On My Way to Meet You (10:40 p.m.)			
Channel A	Mid-Winter	Various programming	Now On My Way to Meet You (8:50 p.m.)				**Positively Yours**		
ENA	Fall	**Unpredictable** (7:50 p.m.)		My Kid's Private Life - Clip	Queen Mantis (R)				
ENA	Mid-Fall	**Unpredictable** (7:50 p.m.)		My Kid's Private Life - Clip	Would You Marry Me? (R)				
ENA	Winter	**Unpredictable** (7:50 p.m.)		Taxi Driver 3 (R)					Unpredictable (R)
ENA	Mid-Winter	Gilchi, It's Okay (R)		No Tail to Tell (9:40 p.m., R)					
ENA	Late Winter	**Punghyanggo2** (7:50 p.m.)		Punghyanggo2 (R)					
ENA	Spring	Various programming							

Notes:

- TV Chosun will broadcast Coldplay's performance live on November 2, 2025 at 8:50 p.m. BTS' Jin will attend the event.

=== Monday ===
Network		7:50 p.m.	8:30 p.m.	9:00 p.m.	10:00 p.m.	10:30 p.m.	11:00 p.m.	11:30 p.m.
SBS	Fall	SBS 8NEWS		Little Big Masters	Same Bed, Different Dreams 2 - You Are My Destiny (10:10 p.m.)			
SBS	Late Winter	SBS 8NEWS		Little Big Masters	**uh, but like, seriously!** (10:10 p.m.)			SBS Nightline
KBS2	Fall	Queen's House	Livingtogether		Mr. House Husband (9:50 p.m., R)			**Pub-Staurant with Ko So-young** (11:35 p.m.)
KBS2	Mid-Fall	**A Graceful Liar**	Livingtogether		**Old lady, Your mine** (9:50 p.m.)			**Pub-Staurant with Ko So-young** (11:35 p.m.)
KBS2	Winter	**A Graceful Liar**	Livingtogether		**Old lady, Your mine** (9:50 p.m.)			Various programming (11:20 p.m.)
KBS2	Mid-Winter	**A Graceful Liar**	Dogs Are Incredible		Malja Show			Various programming (11:45 p.m.)
KBS2	Late Winter	**Pearl in Red**	Dogs Are Incredible		Malja Show			Various programming (11:45 p.m.)
KBS2	Spring	**Pearl in Red**	**3Days**	Malja Show			Various programming	
TV Chosun	Fall	Born Again: True Stories of Survival (8:00 p.m.)		TV CHOSUN News9	Lovers Of Chosun			
TV Chosun	Late Fall	Born Again: True Stories of Survival (8:00 p.m.)		TV CHOSUN News9	**No Next Life**			Trot All star (11:20 p.m.)
TV Chosun	Mid-Winter	Born Again: True Stories of Survival (8:00 p.m.)		TV CHOSUN News9	Lovers Of Chosun			
KBS1	Fall	Woorimal Battle (7:40 p.m.)	Good Luck!	KBS News 9	Golden Oldies		KBS Newsline W	Various programming (11:40 p.m.)
KBS1	Mid-Fall	Woorimal Battle (7:40 p.m.)	**Marie and Her Three Daddies**	KBS News 9	Golden Oldies		KBS Newsline W	Various programming (11:40 p.m.)
tvN	Mid-Summer	Love, Take Two (7:30 p.m., R)		Love, Take Two (8:50 p.m.)	**#ReallyGoodPerson**			
tvN	Fall	Shin's Project (7:30 p.m., R)		**Shin's Project** (8:50 p.m.)	Naked World History (10:10 p.m.)			
tvN	Late Fall	Nice to Not Meet You (7:30 p.m., R)		**Nice to Not Meet You** (8:50 p.m.)	Naked World History (10:10 p.m.)			
tvN	Mid-Winter	Spring Fever (7:30 p.m., R)		**Spring Fever** (8:50 p.m.)	Naked World History (10:10 p.m.)			
tvN	Spring	Siren's Kiss (7:30 p.m., R)		**Siren's Kiss** (8:50 p.m.)	Naked World History (10:10 p.m.)			
tvN	Mid-Spring	Power of Superfoods: in Europe (7:00 p.m.)		Yumi's Cells Season 3 (8:50 p.m.)	Naked World History (10:10 p.m.)			
tvN	Late Spring	Power of Superfoods: in Europe (7:00 p.m.)		**The Legend of Kitchen Soldier** (8:50 p.m.)	Naked World History (10:10 p.m.)			
Channel A	Fall	The 4-Seater Table (8:10 p.m.)		Detectives: The Trade Secret (9:30 p.m.)				Men's Life These Days: Groom's Class (R)
Channel A	Mid-Winter	Various programming		**News A CITY LIVE**	Detectives: The Trade Secret			
ENA	Fall	Various programming	My Troublesome Star (8:40 p.m., R)		**My Troublesome Star**			Various programming
ENA	Mid-Fall	Various programming	Ms. Incognito (8:40 p.m., R)		**Ms. Incognito**			Various programming
ENA	Late Fall	Various programming	Heroes Next Door (8:40 p.m., R)		**Heroes Next Door**			Various programming
ENA	Winter	Various programming	I Dol I (8:40 p.m., R)		**I Dol I**			Various programming
ENA	Late Winter	Various programming	Honour (8:40 p.m., R)		**Honour**			Various programming

=== Tuesday ===
Network		7:50 p.m.	8:30 p.m.	9:00 p.m.	10:00 p.m.	10:30 p.m.	11:00 p.m.	11:30 p.m.
SBS	Fall	SBS 8NEWS		**Little Island, Big Hero**		Dolsing Fourmen (10:40 p.m.)		
SBS	Mid-Fall	SBS 8NEWS		**The Ballad of Us**			Dolsing Fourmen	
SBS	Winter	SBS 8NEWS		Whenever Possible		Dolsing Fourmen (10:40 p.m.)		
SBS	Mid-Winter	SBS 8NEWS		Whenever Possible		**MumuXChacha Ballad Radio** (10:40 p.m.)		
SBS	Late Winter	SBS 8NEWS		Whenever Possible		Same Bed, Different Dreams 2 - You Are My Destiny (10:40 p.m.)		
SBS	Mid-Spring	SBS 8NEWS		**Choi Kang-rokad: Food Spoiler**		Same Bed, Different Dreams 2 - You Are My Destiny (10:40 p.m.)		
KBS2	Fall	Queen's House	Secret of the Celebrity's Disease or Die		Smoking Gun (9:45 p.m.)		Various programming (10:45 p.m.)	
KBS2	Mid-Fall	**A Graceful Liar**	Secret of the Celebrity's Disease or Die		Smoking Gun (9:45 p.m.)		Various programming (10:45 p.m.)	
KBS2	Late Fall	**A Graceful Liar**	Secret of the Celebrity's Disease or Die		Smoking Gun (9:45 p.m.)		Studio K (11:10 a.m.)	
KBS2	Late Winter	**Pearl in Red**	Secret of the Celebrity's Disease or Die		Smoking Gun (9:45 p.m.)		Studio K (11:10 a.m.)	
TV Chosun	Fall	Healthy House 2 (8:00 p.m.)		TV CHOSUN News9	**A Baby Is Born Again**			
TV Chosun	Late Fall	Healthy House 2 (8:00 p.m.)		TV CHOSUN News9	**No Next Life**			Love Call Center: Seven Stars (R)
TV Chosun	Mid-Winter	Healthy House 2 (8:00 p.m.)		TV CHOSUN News9	Miss Trot 4 (R)			
TV Chosun	Spring	Healthy House 2 (8:00 p.m.)		TV CHOSUN News9	**X's Private Life**			
KBS1	Summer	My Neighbor, Charles (7:40 p.m.)	Good Luck!	KBS News 9	Current Sisa Window		KBS Newsline W (10:50 p.m.)	Various programming
KBS1	Mid-Fall	My Neighbor, Charles (7:40 p.m.)	**Marie and Her Three Daddies**	KBS News 9	Current Sisa Window		KBS Newsline W (10:50 p.m.)	Various programming
KBS1	Mid-Spring	My Neighbor, Charles (7:40 p.m.)	**Our Happy Days**	KBS News 9	Current Sisa Window		KBS Newsline W (10:50 p.m.)	Various programming
tvN	Summer	Free 19 (7:40 p.m.)		**Head over Heels** (8:50 p.m.)	Naked World History (10:10 p.m.)			
tvN	Mid-Summer	Free 19 (7:40 p.m.)		**Love, Take Two** (8:50 p.m.)	Naked World History (10:10 p.m.)			
tvN	Fall	Free 19 (7:40 p.m.)		**Shin's Project** (8:50 p.m.)	Kim Chang-ok Show 4 (10:10 p.m.)			
tvN	Late Fall	Free 19 (7:40 p.m.)		**Nice to Not Meet You** (8:50 p.m.)	Kim Chang-ok Show 4 (10:10 p.m.)			Various programming
tvN	Mid-Winter	Free 19 (7:40 p.m.)		**Spring Fever** (8:50 p.m.)	**The Genius Paik 3** (10:10 p.m.)			
tvN	Spring	Free 19 (7:40 p.m.)		**Siren's Kiss** (8:50 p.m.)	**The Genius Paik 3** (10:10 p.m.)			
tvN	Cheongmyeong	Free 19 (7:40 p.m.)		**Siren's Kiss** (8:50 p.m.)	**I am K** (10:10 p.m.)			Various programming
tvN	Mid-Spring	Free 19 (7:40 p.m.)		Yumi's Cells Season 3 (8:40 p.m.)	**Ensemble** (10:10 p.m.)			Various programming
tvN	Late Spring	Free 19 (7:40 p.m.)		**The Legend of Kitchen Soldier** (8:50 p.m.)	**Kill It** (10:10 p.m.)			
Channel A	Late Summer	Make Body God (8:10 p.m.)		The Time of Dog and Wolf (9:20 p.m.)				The 4-Seater Table (R)
Channel A	Late Fall	Make Body God (8:10 p.m.)		The Time of Dog and Wolf (9:20 p.m.)	**Baseball Queen**			
Channel A	Mid-Winter	Make Body God (8:10 p.m.)		**News A CITY LIVE**	**Baseball Queen**			
Channel A	Spring	Make Body God (8:10 p.m.)		**News A CITY LIVE**	**Chef Leo Kang's Leo's Eat?**			Various programming
Channel A	Mid-Spring	Make Body God (8:10 p.m.)		**News A CITY LIVE**	**Heart Signal 5**			
ENA	Fall	Various programming	My Troublesome Star (8:40 p.m., R)		**My Troublesome Star**			**jin seo yeon's NO** (11:20 p.m.)
ENA	Mid-Fall	Various programming	Ms. Incognito (8:40 p.m., R)		**Ms. Incognito**			**jin seo yeon's NO** (11:20 p.m.)
ENA	Late Fall	Various programming	Heroes Next Door (8:40 p.m., R)		**Heroes Next Door**			**jin seo yeon's NO** (11:20 p.m.)
ENA	Winter	Various programming	I Dol I (8:40 p.m., R)		**I Dol I**			**Switch My Home** (11:20 p.m.)
ENA	Late Winter	Various programming	Honour (8:40 p.m., R)		**Honour**			**Switch My Home** (11:20 p.m.)

Notes:

- The broadcast can be canceled due to the 2025 KBO League Post season schedule. KBS 2TV's program was suspended on Oct. 22.
- SBS is "The Ballad of Us" changes every week, with the time ending at 11:40 p.m. or 11 p.m. depending on the amount of filming.
- KBS2 is After the death of actor Lee Soon-jae, "Binge-watching episodes 1 to 4 of Lee Soon-jae's Dog Knows Everything, a special memorial service" aired on November 25, 2025 at 10:45 p.m. to 0:05 a.m.
- SBS is air the three-hour season finale of "The Ballad of Us" on December 2, 2025 at 9 p.m.

=== Wednesday ===
Network		7:50 p.m.	8:30 p.m.	9:00 p.m.	10:00 p.m.	10:30 p.m.	11:00 p.m.	11:30 p.m.
SBS	Fall	SBS 8NEWS		Kick a Goal			Various programming	
SBS	Mid-Fall	SBS 8NEWS		Kick a Goal			The Listen 5	
SBS	Late Fall	SBS 8NEWS		**Dynamite Kiss**		Kick a Goal		
SBS	Mid-Winter	SBS 8NEWS		Kick a Goal			Various programming	
SBS	Mid-Spring	SBS 8NEWS		**Sold Out on You**		Kick a Goal		
KBS2	Fall	Queen's House	The Return of Superman		Long Hair Flying in the Wind (9:50 p.m.)			Studio K (11:35 a.m.)
KBS2	Mid-Fall	**A Graceful Liar**	The Return of Superman		Talk Delivery (9:50 p.m.)		Walking on Thin Ice (11:10 p.m., R)	
KBS2	Late Fall	**A Graceful Liar**	The Return of Superman		Talk Delivery (9:50 p.m.)		Last Summer (11:10 p.m., R)	
KBS2	Winter	**A Graceful Liar**	The Return of Superman		**LOVE : TRACK**		Gag Concert (11:05 p.m., R)	
KBS2	Mid-Winter	**A Graceful Liar**	The Return of Superman		To My Beloved Thief (9:50 p.m., R)			
KBS2	Late Winter	**Pearl in Red**	The Return of Superman		To My Beloved Thief (9:50 p.m., R)			
KBS2	Spring	**Pearl in Red**	The Return of Superman		**Super Catch: The Eye of Truth**		3Days (10:55 p.m., R)	
TV Chosun	Fall	Perfect Life (8:00 p.m.)		TV CHOSUN News9	**My Own Over-Immersion Club**			
TV Chosun	Late Fall	Perfect Life (8:00 p.m.)		TV CHOSUN News9	**Love affair of Diet**			
TV Chosun	Mid-Winter	Perfect Life (8:00 p.m.)		TV CHOSUN News9	**Daddy and Me 3**			
TV Chosun	Late Spring	Perfect Life (8:00 p.m.)		TV CHOSUN News9	**Survivor 2**			
KBS1	Fall	Workman 2 (7:40 p.m.)	Good Luck!	KBS News 9	Mysteries of the Human Body		KBS Newsline W (10:50 p.m.)	With Issue Pick Teacher (R)
KBS1	Mid-Fall	Workman 2 (7:40 p.m.)	**Marie and Her Three Daddies**	KBS News 9	Mysteries of the Human Body		KBS Newsline W (10:50 p.m.)	With Issue Pick Teacher (R)
KBS1	Winter	Dogs Are Incredible (7:40 p.m., R)	**Marie and Her Three Daddies**	KBS News 9	Mysteries of the Human Body		KBS Newsline W (10:50 p.m.)	With Issue Pick Teacher (R)
KBS1	Mid-Winter	**Livingtogether - Shinhye Town** (7:40 p.m.)	**Marie and Her Three Daddies**	KBS News 9	Mysteries of the Human Body		KBS Newsline W (10:50 p.m.)	With Issue Pick Teacher (R)
tvN	Fall	Various programming	You Quiz on the Block (8:45 p.m.)				Various programming	
tvN	Late Winter	Various programming	You Quiz on the Block			**Our Universe**		Various programming
Channel A	Fall	Star Health Ranking No.1 (8:10 p.m.)		Men's Life These Days: Groom's Class (9:30 p.m.)				Various programming
Channel A	Mid-Winter	Star Health Ranking No.1 (8:00 p.m.)		**News A CITY LIVE**	The Time of Dog and Wolf			
ENA		Various programming	I'm Solo (R)			I'm Solo		

Notes:

- Due to APEC South Korea 2025, the program was mostly suspended or changed on October 29, 2025.
- KBS2 is air the 46th Blue Dragon Film Awards on November 19, 2025 at 8:30 p.m. Other programs canceled for a day.
- KBS2 is After the death of actor Lee Soon-jae, "The National Actor Lee Soon-jae's Ten Minutes, Your Minor" aired on November 26, 2025 at 11:10 p.m. to 0:25 a.m.
- SBS is scheduled to air the 2025 SBS Drama Awards on December 31, 2025 at 9 p.m. Other programs will be cancelled for a day.
- KBS2 is scheduled to air the 2025 KBS Drama Awards on December 31, 2025 at 8:30 p.m. Other programs will be canceled for a day.

=== Thursday ===
Network		7:50 p.m.	8:30 p.m.	9:00 p.m.	10:00 p.m.	10:30 p.m.	11:00 p.m.	11:30 p.m.
SBS	Fall	SBS 8NEWS		**My Turn**		The Story of That Day That Lingers (10:20 p.m.)		
SBS	Mid-Fall	SBS 8NEWS		**VogoVogoVogo Report**		The Story of That Day That Lingers (10:20 p.m.)		
SBS	Late Fall	SBS 8NEWS		**Dynamite Kiss**		The Story of That Day That Lingers (10:20 p.m.)		
SBS	Mid-Winter	SBS 8NEWS		**Joint Meeting**		The Story of That Day That Lingers (10:20 p.m.)		
SBS	Late Winter	SBS 8NEWS		**The Korean Chef**		The Story of That Day That Lingers (10:20 p.m.)		
SBS	Spring	SBS 8NEWS		Various programming		The Story of That Day That Lingers (10:20 p.m.)		
SBS	Mid-Spring	SBS 8NEWS		**Sold Out on You**		The Story of That Day That Lingers (10:20 p.m.)		
KBS2	Fall	Queen's House	Problem Child in House		Joint Travel Expense Area (9:50 p.m.)		Various programming (11:10 a.m.)	
KBS2	Mid-Fall	**A Graceful Liar**	Problem Child in House		Dogs Are Incredible (9:50 p.m.)		Walking on Thin Ice (11:10 p.m., R)	
KBS2	Late Fall	**A Graceful Liar**	Problem Child in House		Dogs Are Incredible (9:50 p.m.)		Last Summer (11:10 p.m., R)	
KBS2	Mid-Winter	**A Graceful Liar**	Problem Child in House		**The Logic** (9:50 p.m.)		Mr. House Husband (11:10 p.m., R)	
KBS2	Late Winter	**Pearl in Red**	Problem Child in House		**Duet Across the Sea** (9:50 p.m.)		Mr. House Husband (11:10 p.m., R)	
KBS2	Mid-Spring	**Pearl in Red**	Problem Child in House		**Cabbage Your Life** (9:50 p.m.)		Various programming (11:05 p.m.)	
TV Chosun	Summer	The Law of Disease (8:00 p.m.)		TV CHOSUN News9	Love Call Center: Seven Stars			
TV Chosun	Winter	The Law of Disease (8:00 p.m.)		TV CHOSUN News9	Miss Trot 4			
TV Chosun	Mid-Spring	The Law of Disease (8:00 p.m.)		TV CHOSUN News9	**Shall We Duet?**			
TV Chosun	Late Spring	The Law of Disease (8:00 p.m.)		TV CHOSUN News9	**Miss Trot for You**			
KBS1	Summer	Korean Cuisine and Dining (7:40 p.m.)	Good Luck!	KBS News 9	Docu Insight		KBS Newsline W (10:50 p.m.)	Various programming
KBS1	Mid-Fall	Korean Cuisine and Dining (7:40 p.m.)	**Marie and Her Three Daddies**	KBS News 9	Docu Insight		KBS Newsline W (10:50 p.m.)	Various programming
KBS1	Mid-Spring	Korean Cuisine and Dining (7:40 p.m.)	**Our Happy Days**	KBS News 9	Docu Insight		KBS Newsline W (10:50 p.m.)	Various programming
tvN	Summer	Table tales (7:00 p.m.)	Handsome Guys (8:45 p.m.)				You Quiz on the Block (R)	
tvN	Late Fall	Table tales (7:00 p.m.)	Sixth Sense: City Tour 2 (8:45 p.m.)			**Perfect Glow** (10:40 p.m.)		
tvN	Mid-Winter	Table tales (7:00 p.m.)	**Cha's Family** (8:40 p.m.)			Various programming (10:40 p.m.)		
tvN	Late Winter	Table tales (7:00 p.m.)	**Cha's Family** (8:40 p.m.)			**Our Universe**		
tvN	Spring	Table tales (7:00 p.m.)	**Amazing Thursday** (8:40 p.m.)			You Quiz on the Block (10:40 p.m., R)		
tvN	Late Spring	Table tales (7:00 p.m.)	**Fresh off the Sea in Calape** (8:40 p.m.)			You Quiz on the Block (10:40 p.m., R)		
tvN	Summer	Table tales (7:00 p.m.)	**Undercover Chef** (8:40 p.m.)			You Quiz on the Block (10:40 p.m., R)		
Channel A	Summer	The Time of Dog and Wolf (8:10 p.m., R)			Brain Academi (9:40 p.m.)			Various programming
Channel A	Mid-Fall	The Time of Dog and Wolf (8:10 p.m., R)			My Golden Kids (9:40 p.m., R)		Various programming (11:10 p.m., R)	
Channel A	Late Fall	Various programming (8:10 p.m., R)						
Channel A	Mid-Winter	Amor Body (8:00 p.m.)		**News A CITY LIVE**	**Chef and a Hunter**			
Channel A	Spring	Amor Body (8:00 p.m.)		**News A CITY LIVE**	Groom's Class 2			
ENA		I'm Solo (7:10 p.m., R)		I'm Solo: Love Continues (R)		I'm Solo: Love Continues		

=== Friday ===
Network		7:50 p.m.	8:30 p.m.	9:00 p.m.	10:00 p.m.	10:30 p.m.	11:00 p.m.	11:30 p.m.	12:00 p.m.
SBS	Fall	SBS 8NEWS		Curious Story Y (8:50 p.m.)	**Queen Mantis** (9:50 p.m.)		Various programming (11:10 p.m.)		
SBS	Mid-Fall	SBS 8NEWS		Curious Story Y (8:50 p.m.)	**Would You Marry Me?** (9:50 p.m.)		**My Grumpy Secretary** (11:10 p.m.)		
SBS	Winter	SBS 8NEWS		Curious Story Y (8:50 p.m.)	**Taxi Driver 3** (9:50 p.m.)		**My Grumpy Secretary** (11:10 p.m.)		
SBS	Mid-Winter	SBS 8NEWS		Curious Story Y (8:50 p.m.)	**No Tail to Tell** (9:50 p.m.)		**My Grumpy Secretary** (11:10 p.m.)		
SBS	Late Winter	SBS 8NEWS		Curious Story Y (8:50 p.m.)	**No Tail to Tell** (9:50 p.m.)		Various programming (11:10 p.m.)		
SBS	Spring	SBS 8NEWS		Curious Story Y (8:50 p.m.)	**Phantom Lawyer** (9:50 p.m.)		Various programming (11:10 p.m.)		
KBS2	Fall	Queen's House	Stars' Top Recipe at Fun-Staurant		**The Seasons: 10CM's Pat-Pat**				Gag Concert (11:50 a.m., R)
KBS2	Mid-Fall	**A Graceful Liar**	Stars' Top Recipe at Fun-Staurant		**The Seasons: 10CM's Pat-Pat**			Studio K (11:40 a.m.)	
KBS2	Late Fall	**A Graceful Liar**	Stars' Top Recipe at Fun-Staurant		**The Seasons: 10CM's Pat-Pat**			Old lady, Your mine (11:40 a.m., R)	
KBS2	Late Winter	**Pearl in Red**	Stars' Top Recipe at Fun-Staurant		**The Seasons: 10CM's Pat-Pat**			Various programming	
KBS2	Mid-Spring	**Friday Night Baseball**			Stars' Top Recipe at Fun-Staurant			**The Seasons: Sung Si-kyung's Eardrum Boyfriend**	
TV Chosun	Fall	Get away, My age (8:00 p.m.)		TV CHOSUN News9	**Trot All star**				
TV Chosun	Mid-Winter	Get away, My age (8:00 p.m.)		TV CHOSUN News9	**Golden Friday**				
KBS1	Fall	Early Ajobter (7:40 p.m.)	Good Luck!	KBS News 9	ChuZeok 60		KBS Newsline W (10:50 p.m.)	Indie Film Theater	
KBS1	Mid-Fall	**Real Camera Eye** (7:40 p.m.)	**Marie and Her Three Daddies**	KBS News 9	ChuZeok 60		KBS Newsline W (10:50 p.m.)	Indie Film Theater	
KBS1	Mid-Spring	Conversations with the Past (7:40 p.m., R)	**Our Happy Days**	KBS News 9	ChuZeok 60		KBS Newsline W (10:50 p.m.)	Indie Film Theater	
tvN	Fall	Various programming	Iron Girls 2 (8:45 p.m.)			Various programming (10:35 p.m.)			
tvN	Mid-Fall	Various programming	**KONGKONG PANGPANG: Overseas Exploration for Laughter and Happiness** (8:45 p.m.)			Various programming (10:35 p.m.)			
tvN	Winter	**Yongyeo's Trendy Table** (6:55 p.m.)	**KONGKONG PANGPANG: Overseas Exploration for Laughter and Happiness** (8:45 p.m.)				Various programming		
tvN	Early mid-Winter	**Yongyeo's Trendy Table** (6:55 p.m.)	**Reply 1988 10th Anniversary** (8:40 p.m.)				Various programming		
tvN	Mid-Winter	**The Village Barber** (6:40 p.m., R)	**The Village Barber**				Various programming		
Channel A	Fall	My Golden Kids (8:00 p.m.)			Steel Earth (9:40 p.m.)		Various programming (10:50 p.m.)		
Channel A	Late Fall	My Golden Kids (8:00 p.m.)			**Mask Chef** (9:40 p.m.)			Men's Life These Days: Groom's Class (R)	
Channel A	Mid-Winter	The Time of Dog and Wolf (8:00 p.m., R)		My Golden Kids		Various programming			
Channel A	Spring	**You Can't Change Your House** (8:00 p.m.)		My Golden Kids		Various programming			
ENA	Fall	Trouble Travel (7:00 p.m., R)	Trouble Travel (8:40 p.m.)			ENA TV Movie (10:40 p.m.)			
ENA	Late Fall	Heroes Next Door (7:30 p.m., R)	High School Mystery Club (8:40 p.m.)		**Super Seller: Incentive Game**			Heroes Next Door (11:40 p.m., R)	
ENA	Mid-Winter	I Dol I (7:20 p.m., R)			**Super Seller: Incentive Game**			High School Mystery Club	
ENA	Spring	Various programming							
ENA	Late Spring	**The Scout**			The Scarecrow (R)		**Director's Arena**		

Notes:

- KBS2 is scheduled to air the 2025 KBS Song Festival on December 19, 2025 at 7:15 p.m. Other programs will be canceled for a day.

=== Saturday ===
Network		8:00 p.m.	8:30 p.m.	9:00 p.m.	9:20 p.m.	9:50 p.m.	10:30 p.m.	11:10 p.m.
SBS	Fall	SBS 8NEWS	Queen Mantis (8:35 p.m., R)			**Queen Mantis**		Unanswered Questions
SBS	Mid-Fall	SBS 8NEWS	Would You Marry Me? (8:35 p.m., R)			**Would You Marry Me?**		Unanswered Questions
SBS	Winter	SBS 8NEWS	Taxi Driver 3 (8:35 p.m., R)			**Taxi Driver 3**		Unanswered Questions
SBS	Mid-Winter	SBS 8NEWS	No Tail to Tell (8:35 p.m., R)			**No Tail to Tell** (9:50 p.m.)		Unanswered Questions
SBS	Spring	SBS 8NEWS	Phantom Lawyer (8:35 p.m., R)			**Phantom Lawyer**		Unanswered Questions
SBS	Late Spring	SBS 8NEWS	My Royal Nemesis (8:35 p.m., R)			**My Royal Nemesis** (9:50 p.m.)		Unanswered Questions
KBS2	Fall	Our Golden Days			**Walking on Thin Ice**		Mr. House Husband (10:45 p.m.)	
KBS2	Mid-Fall	Our Golden Days			**Last Summer**		Mr. House Husband (10:45 p.m.)	
KBS2	Winter	Our Golden Days			Mr. House Husband		**Malja Show** (10:40 p.m.)	
KBS2	Mid-Winter	Our Golden Days			**To My Beloved Thief**		Mr. House Husband (10:40 p.m.)	
KBS2	Late Winter	**Recipe for Love**			**To My Beloved Thief**		Mr. House Husband (10:40 p.m.)	
KBS2	Spring	**Recipe for Love**			Mr. House Husband		**Ed & Ryu: Mad About Seafood** (10:40 p.m.)	
KBS2	Late Spring	**Recipe for Love**			Mr. House Husband		Old lady, Your mine 2 (10:40 p.m.)	
TV Chosun	Fall	Various programming		Strong Enemies			**Confidence Queen**	
TV Chosun	Mid-Fall	**Run for You** (7:50 p.m.)		Strong Enemies			Various programming (10:40 p.m.)	
TV Chosun	Winter	Miss Trot 4 (7:50 p.m., R)		Strong Enemies			**Hidden FC** (10:40 p.m.)	
TV Chosun	Spring	Miss Trot 4 (7:50 p.m., R)		Strong Enemies			**Doctor Shin**	
TV Chosun	Mid-Spring	**SeokSam Play** (7:50 p.m.)		Strong Enemies			**Doctor Shin**	
TV Chosun	Late Spring	**SeokSam Play** (7:50 p.m.)		Strong Enemies			Grand Prince, A Man Who Wants to Be King	
KBS1	Fall	Documentary Zone		KBS News 9	KBS World Report (9:30 p.m.)		Docu ON (10:15 p.m.)	**KBS National Tour Concert**
KBS1	Winter	Documentary Zone		KBS News 9	KBS World Report (9:30 p.m.)		Docu ON (10:15 p.m.)	ChuZeok 60 (R)
KBS1	Mid-Winter	Documentary Zone		KBS News 9	KBS World Report (9:30 p.m.)		Docu ON (10:15 p.m.)	lifeMOVIE
tvN	Fall	DoReMi Market (7:40 p.m.)			**Typhoon Family**		Various programming (10:40 p.m.)	
tvN	Winter	DoReMi Market (7:40 p.m.)			**Pro Bono**		Various programming (10:40 p.m.)	
tvN	Fall	DoReMi Market (7:35 p.m.)		**Undercover Miss Hong** (9:10 p.m.)			Various programming (10:40 p.m.)	
tvN	Spring	DoReMi Market (7:35 p.m.)		**Mad Concrete Dreams** (9:10 p.m.)			Various programming (10:40 p.m.)	
Channel A	Fall	Detectives: The Trade Secret (7:50 p.m., R)			My Golden Kids(R)		Various programming	
Channel A	Late Fall	Steel Earth (7:50 p.m.)			My Golden Kids(R)		**Mask Chef** (R)	
Channel A	Mid-Winter	Steel Earth (7:10 p.m.)	My Golden Kids(R)			**Baseball Queen** (9:40 p.m., R)	**Positively Yours**	
Channel A	Spring	Steel Earth (7:10 p.m.)	The Time of Dog and Wolf (R)			My Golden Kids(R)		Detectives: The Trade Secret (R)
ENA	Fall	Gotta Earn His Keep (7:50 p.m.)			Various programming			
ENA	Mid-Fall	**Gilchi, It's Okay** (7:50 p.m.)			**The Science of Delicious** (9:30 p.m.)			The Science of Delicious (11:00 p.m., R)
ENA	Winter	**Gilchi, It's Okay** (7:50 p.m.)			Unpredictable (9:30 p.m., R)			Taxi Driver 3 (R)
ENA	Mid-Winter	**Gilchi, It's Okay** (7:50 p.m.)			**Change Street** (9:30 p.m.)		Gilchi, It's Okay (10:45 p.m., R)	

Notes:

- tvN Perfect Glow's episode aired on Saturday night at 10:50 p.m., but from the second episode it was moved to Thursday.

== By network ==
=== KBS ===
==== KBS2 ====
Returning series:

New series:

- Old lady, Your mine
- Pub-Staurant with Ko So-young

=== SBS ===
Returning series:

New series:

=== TV Chosun ===
Returning series:

- TV CHOSUN NEWS
  - TV CHOSUN News7
  - TV CHOSUN News9
  - Original's Show: Current affairs
- Huh Young-man's Food Travel
- Love Call Center: Seven Stars
- Born Again: True Stories of Survival
- Lovers Of Chosun
- Healthy House 2
- Perfect Life
- The Law of Disease
- Get away, My age
- Strong Enemies
- One hit will turn the game around (re-run)

New series:

- Confidence Queen
- No Next Life
- Miss Trot 4
- Love affair of Diet
- Doctor Shin
- My Own Over-Immersion Club
- Trot All star
- A Baby Is Born Again
- 10 million Trot Show
- Run for You

=== ENA ===
Returning series:

- I'm Solo
- I'm Solo: Love Continues
- Trouble Travel
- ENA TV Movie
- Gotta Earn His Keep

New series:

- Unpredictable
- My Troublesome Star
- Ms. Incognito
- UDT: Our Neighborhood Special Forces
- I Dol I
- Honour
- Gilchi, It's Okay
- The Science of Delicious

== Renewals and cancellations ==
=== Cancellations/series endings ===
==== KBS2 ====
- Pub-Staurant with Ko So-young

==== SBS ====
- Dolsing Fourmen

== See also ==
- 2025–26 Canadian network television schedule
- 2025–26 United States network television schedule
- 2025–26 United States network television schedule (morning)
- 2025–26 United States network television schedule (daytime)
- 2025–26 United States network television schedule (late night)
- 2025–26 United States network television schedule (overnight)
- 2026 in South Korean television
