= 2026 in South Korean television =

This is a non-comprehensive list of Television in South Korea related events from 2026.

== New series and returning shows ==
Title	Channel/Platform	First Aired	Last Aired	Status	Ref.
The Judge Returns	MBC TV	January 2	February 14	Ended	
To My Beloved Thief	KBS2	January 3	February 22	Ended	
Spring Fever	tvN	January 5	February 10	Ended	
Can This Love Be Translated?	Netflix	January 16		Ended	
No Tail to Tell	SBS TV	January 16	February 28	Ended	
Positively Yours	Channel A	January 17	February 22	Ended	
Undercover Miss Hong	tvN	January 17	March 8	Ended	
Recipe for Love	KBS2	January 31	July 19	Ended	
Honour	ENA	February 2	March 10	Ended	
Bloody Flower	Hulu/Disney+	February 4	February 25	Ended	
Our Universe	tvN	February 4	March 13	Ended	
The Art of Sarah	Netflix	February 13		Ended	
Love Phobia	U+ Mobile TV/Lifetime	February 19	March 13	Ended	
In Your Radiant Season	MBC TV	February 20	April 3	Ended	
Pearl in Red	KBS2	February 23	August 7	Ended	
The Practical Guide to Love	JTBC	February 28	April 5	Ended	
Siren's Kiss	tvN	March 2	April 7	Ended	
Always Meet Again	Heavenly	March 5	March 26	Ended	
Boyfriend on Demand	Netflix	March 6		Ended	
Still Shining	JTBC	March 6	April 3	Ended	
Phantom Lawyer	SBS TV	March 13	May 2	Ended	
Doctor Shin	TV Chosun	March 14	May 3	Ended	
Mad Concrete Dreams	tvN	March 14	April 19	Ended	
Climax	Genie TV/ENA	March 16	April 14	Ended	
Cabbage Your Life	KBS2	March 26	May 28	Ended	
Our Happy Days	KBS1	March 30	September 17	Ended	
Bloodhounds (season 2)	Netflix	April 3		Ended	
Perfect Crown	MBC TV	April 10	May 16	Ended	
Yumi's Cells (season 3)	TVING/tvN	April 13	May 4	Ended	
Absolute Value of Romance	Coupang Play	April 17	May 29	Ended	
Reverse	Wavve	April 17	May 8	Ended	
We Are All Trying Here	JTBC	April 18	May 24	Ended	
The Scarecrow	Genie TV/ENA	April 20	May 26	Ended	
Sold Out on You	SBS TV	April 22	May 28	Ended	
If Wishes Could Kill	Netflix	April 24		Ended	
Filing for Love	tvN	April 25	May 31	Ended	
Gold Land	Hulu/Disney+	April 29	May 27	Ended	
My Royal Nemesis	SBS TV	May 8	June 20	Ended	
Azure Spring	MBN+	May 11	May 26	Ended	
The Legend of Kitchen Soldier	TVING/tvN	May 11	June 16	Ended	
The Wonderfools	Netflix	May 15		Ended	
Fifties Professionals	MBC TV	May 22	June 27	Ended	
Love Class 3	Wavve/Watcha	May 28	July 17	Ended	
Reborn Rookie	JTBC	May 30	July 5	Ended	
Doctor on the Edge	Genie TV/ENA	June 1	July 7	Ended	
Teach You a Lesson	Netflix	June 5		Ended	
See You at Work Tomorrow!	tvN	June 22	July 28	Ended	
Agent Kim Reactivated	SBS TV	June 26	July 25	Ended	
The Prosecutor's Proposal	Wavve	June 26	July 24	Ended	
Notes from the Last Row	Netflix	June 26		Ended	
The Husband	KBS2	July 4	August 9	Ended	
Love in Sync	Lifetime/U+ Mobile TV	July 4	July 26	Ended	
Family Register	MBC TV	July 6	December 18	Ongoing	
The Apartment Job	JTBC	July 11	August 16	Ended	
Dream to You	Genie TV/ENA	July 13	August 18	Ended	
The East Palace	Netflix	July 17		Ended	
Spooky in Love	tvN	July 18	August 23	Ended	
A Shop for Killers (season 2)	Hulu/Disney+	July 22	Aug 12	Ended	
Love on the Menu	KBS2	July 25	January 10, 2027	Ongoing	
The Affair Was Just the Beginning	Coupang Play	July 31	September 4	Ended	
A Bona Fide Killer	MBC TV	July 31	September 12	Ended	
My Bias, My Boss	tvN	August 3	September 8	Ended	
Flex X Cop (season 2)	SBS TV	August 7	September 19	Ended	
Our Sticky Love	Netflix	August 7		Ended	
A Trap Called Desire	KBS2	August 10	December 25	Ongoing	
OK! Let's Get Divorced	KBS Drama	August 19	September 24	Ended	
New Recruit (season 4)	ENA	August 24	September 29	Ended	
Mousetrap	Netflix	August 28		Ended	
Summertime	Wavve	August 28	September 25	Ended	
Four Hands, Two Sonatas	tvN	August 29	October 4	Ended	
Made in Korea (season 2)	Hulu/Disney+	September 9	September 23	Ended	
The Ordinary Jackpot	TVING/tvN	September 10	October 8	Ended	
A Love Other Than Yours	KBS2	September 12	November 1	Ended	
The Scandal	Netflix	September 18		Ended	
Dive into You	Channel A	September 26	November 1	Ended	
Mission: Mompossible	KBS1	September 28	March 12, 2027	Ongoing	
Boy, with Caution	Heavenly	September 30	October 21	Ongoing	
Between Steps	ENA	October 5	November 10	Ended	
Merry Berry Love (Note: A South Korean-Japanese co-production.)	Hulu/Disney+	October 7	December 9	Ongoing	
Take Charge of My Heart	Netflix	October 9		Ended	
Doctor X: Mafia in White	SBS TV	October 9	November 14	Ended	
100 Days of Deception	tvN	October 10	November 29	Ongoing	
Make Me Tingle	TVING	October 15	November 5	Ended	
Love in Disguise	tvN	October 18	November 24	Ongoing	
Final Table	JTBC	October 24	November 29	Ongoing	
Oh! My Guard	Lifetime	October 24	December 13	Ongoing	
Summer Vacation	Lifetime	October 26	November 24	Ongoing	
Dead-End Job	Netflix	October 30		Ended	
The Perfect Lie	MBC TV	October 30	December 5	Ongoing	
The Remarried Empress	Disney+	November 3	November 25	Ongoing	
Francesca Next Door	Wavve	November 6	November 13	Ended	
One-of-a-Kind Romance	TVING	November 9	December 14	Ongoing	
Happy Anding	tvN	November 11	December 17	Ongoing	
What a Boss Wants	MBN	November 11	December 17	Ongoing	
Sword & Silence	KBS2	November 14	February 14, 2027	Ongoing	
Crash (season 2)	ENA	November 16	December 22	Ongoing	
The Blue Road	Netflix	November 20		Ended	
Good Partner (season 2)	SBS TV	November 20	January 9, 2027	Ongoing	
The Substitute	TVING	November 23		Awaiting release	
Nine to Six	SBS TV	November 25	January 7, 2027	Awaiting release	
Sacred Jewel	JTBC	December 5	January 17, 2027	Awaiting release	
Tantara	Netflix	December 11	December 25	Awaiting release	

== Ending ==
End date	Title	Channel/Platform	First Aired	Ref.
January 8	Villains	TVING	December 18, 2025	
January 10	Taxi Driver (season 3)	SBS TV	November 21, 2025	
January 11	Pro Bono	tvN	December 6, 2025	
January 11	Surely Tomorrow	JTBC	December 6, 2025	
January 23	Love Me	JTBC	December 19, 2025	
January 25	Our Golden Days	KBS2	August 9, 2025	
January 27	Idol I	ENA	December 22, 2025	
February 20	A Graceful Liar	KBS2	September 22, 2025	
March 26	Marie and Her Three Daddies	KBS1	October 13, 2025	
July 2	The First Man	KBS2	December 15, 2025	

== See also ==
- List of Korean dramas
- 2025-26 Canadian network television schedule
- 2025–26 South Korea network television schedule
- 2025–26 United States network television schedule
- 2025 in South Korean television
