= Monster Union =

South Korean production company

- Monster Union logo as of 2021
- Industry: Entertainment; Media production
- Founded: June 9, 2016; 10 years ago
- Headquarters: 20th floor, KBS Media Center, 45 Maebong-san-ro, Sangam-dong, Mapo-gu, Seoul, South Korea
- Area served: worldwide
- Key people: Kim Hyung-joon (President)
- Products: Korean television drama; Korean television show
- Services: Production; Distribution
- Owner: KBS (70%); KBS Media (19.47%); KBS N (9.73%)
- Parent: Korean Broadcasting System
- Website: monsterunion.co.kr

Monster Union (Korean: 몬스터 유니온) is a South Korean production and distribution company founded on June 9, 2016. It is a subsidiary of the Korean Broadcasting System (KBS).

== History ==
The company, which focuses on producing entertainment and dramas, was launched in August 2016. Its first president and chief executive officer was Park Seong-hye, whose appointment brought a fresh perspective to the team as she had experience as a top star manager and had produced popular dramas.

Ahead of the company's August launch, Park shared her vision for the company in an interview for the KBS newsletter. She explained that the name Monster Union symbolized a collaboration among talented producers and highlighted the company's role as a bridge between KBS and external partners. The office for Monster Union was being established in the KBS Media building in Sangam-dong, and discussions for investment and co-production with external production companies were in progress. The company was gearing up to release its first project under the name Monster Union in the upcoming year.

Monster Union brought on board renowned directors from KBS to lead its drama and entertainment departments. Former KBS drama director Moon Bo-hyun was appointed as the head of the drama department, while Seo Soo-min took charge of the entertainment department. The drama department included directors with experience in popular dramas like Bread, Love and Dreams, Neighborhood Lawyer Jo Deul-ho, Seoyoung, My Daughter, Brain, and Descendants of the Sun. Yoo Ho-jin, who had previously directed KBS's 2 Days & 1 Night Season 3, joined as an entertainment director.

The establishment of Monster Union by KBS sparked controversy among outsourced production companies, leading to a statement of condemnation from three industry associations. In response, Park clarified that Monster Union aimed to coexist with outsourced production companies by leveraging KBS's expertise and experience. She emphasized a spirit of cooperation and outlined the company's goal of creating globally recognized content and expanding its cultural content intellectual property (IP) business. Park also mentioned plans to distribute content through various platforms, including the web and apps, in addition to KBS's main channel.

In 2017, Monster Union produced its first drama, Queen for Seven Days.

== Production works ==
=== Television series ===
Year	Title	Network	Notes	Ref.
2017	Queen for Seven Days	KBS2	Co-produced with Oh! Brothers Production	
2017	Hit the Top	KBS2	Co-produced with Chorokbaem Media	
2017	Meloholic	OCN		
2018	Suits	KBS2	Co-produced with EnterMedia Pictures and NBCUniversal Global Distribution	
2018	Are You Human?	KBS2		
2018	Matrimonial Chaos	KBS2	Co-produced with The I Entertainment	
2019	My Fellow Citizens!	KBS2	Co-produced with Won Contents	
2019	I Hate Going to Work	KBS2		
2019	Angel's Last Mission: Love	KBS2	Co-produced with Victory Contents	
2019	The Tale of Nokdu	KBS2	Co-produced with Production H	
2020	Born Again	KBS2	Co-produced with UFO Production	
2020	Soul Mechanic	KBS2	Co-produced with Imagine Asia	
2020	Flower of Evil	tvN	Co-produced with Studio Dragon	
2020	Homemade Love Story	KBS2	Co-produced with Production H	
2020	Do Do Sol Sol La La Sol	KBS2		
2021	Sell Your Haunted House	KBS2	Co-produced with May Queen Pictures	
2021	Dali & Cocky Prince	KBS2	Co-produced with Copus Korea Co. Ltd.	
2021	The King's Affection	KBS2	Co-produced with Story Hunter	
2021	Moonshine	KBS2	Co-produced with People Story Company	
2021	The King of Tears, Lee Bang-won	KBS1		
2021	Uncle	TV Chosun	Co-produced with Higround	
2022	Bravo, My Life	KBS1		
2022	Café Minamdang	KBS2	Co-produced with People Story Company and AD406	
2022	The Love in Your Eyes	KBS1		
2023	Apple of My Eye	KBS1		
2023	Heartbeat	KBS2	Co-produced with WeMad	
2023	Korea–Khitan War	KBS2	Co-produced with Vive Studios	
2023	Unpredictable Family	KBS1	Co-produced with Ascendio	
2023	High Cookie	U+ Mobile TV	Co-produced with Arc Media and Studio X+U	
2024	Love Song for Illusion	KBS2	Co-produced with Fantagio	
2024	The Two Sisters	KBS2		
2024	Nothing Uncovered	KBS2	Co-produced with Production H	
2024	Suji & Uri	KBS1	Co-produced with Samhwa Networks	
2024	Family Matters	Coupang Play	Co-produced with KeyEast, Ordinary Gem, and Borderless Film	
2024–2025	My Merry Marriage	KBS1	Co-produced with DK E&M	
2024–2025	Iron Family	KBS2	Co-produced with KeyEast	
2025	Dear. M	KBS Joy	Co-produced with Playlist Studio	
2025	Good Luck!	KBS1	Co-produced with Box Media	
2025	Pump Up the Healthy Love	KBS2	Co-produced with CJ ENM STUDIOS, Bon Factory, Key East	
2025	Spring of Youth	SBS TV	Co-produced with Studio S, FNC Story	
2025	Our Unwritten Seoul	tvN	Co-produced with Higround	
2025	The First Night with the Duke	KBS2	Co-produced with Studio N	
2025	Our Golden Days	KBS2	Co-produced with Studio Coming Soon, and Studio Bom	
2025	Twelve	KBS2	Co-produced with Contents, Big Punch Pictures, Nova Film, The Contents On, and Studio X+U	
2025	Dear X	TVING	Co-produced with Siwoo Company	
2025	Marie and Her Three Daddies	KBS1	Co-produced with LI Entertainment	
2025	Last Summer	KBS2	Co-produced with Slingshot Studio	
2026	Pearl in Red	KBS2	Co-produced with DK E&M	
2026	Our Happy Days	KBS1	Co-produced with Sayon Media and Contents G	
2026	Love on the Menu	KBS2	Co-produced with Contents G	
2026	Mission: Mompossible	KBS1	Co-produced with Fantagio	
2026	Sword & Silence	KBS2	Co-produced with KeyEast	
2026	I'm Against My Romance	MBC TV		

=== Television shows ===
Year	Title	Network	Notes	Ref.
2017	Drinking Guys	Sky Drama	Co-produced with Sky Group	
2017	Kim Saeng-min's Receipt	KBS2	Co-produced with Contents Lab Vivo	
2018	Where on Earth??	KBS2		
