= Park Seong-hye =

South Korean entertainment executive (born 1970)

- 박성혜
- Born: 1970 (age 55–56); South Korea
- Education: Myongji University (Bachelor of English Literature); Hongik University (Master of Advertising and Public Relations)
- Occupations: Producer; Entertainment Executive
- Years active: 1994 to 2023
- Employer: Ordinary Gem

Korean name
- Hangul: 박성혜
- RR: Bak Seonghye
- MR: Pak Sŏnghye

Park Seong-hye (Korean: 박성혜; born 1970) is a South Korean entertainment executive, planner, and producer. She began her career as an actor manager and later became the CEO of KeyEast. After retiring from KeyEast in November, 2023, she established Ordinary Gem in December 2023.

In the early 1990s, Park managed actresses including Yum Jung-ah, Kim Hye-soo, and Jeon Do-yeon, establishing herself as a prominent manager in the industry. She is recognized for discovering and nurturing talents such as Ji Jin-hee, Hwang Jung-min, Im Soo-jung, Gong Hyo-jin, Yoon Jin-seo, Ha Jung-woo, and Gong Yoo. Park was also a founding member of the entertainment agency Sidus HQ and contributed significantly to its development into a leading company in the sector. She served as a Director at the Korea Entertainment Management Association from 2005 to 2008. She retired from her management career at the age of 38 for health reasons.

In 2011, Park established the drama production company Oh!BoyProject and later in 2016 became the CEO of Monster Union, a production company established by KBS. From 2018 to 2023, she held the position of CEO at KeyEast.

== Early life and education ==
Park Seong-hye was born in 1970 in Seoul. She has been a pop culture enthusiast since a young age. Her passion for pop music began in the third grade of elementary school, and she spent her time watching various dramas and award ceremonies on AFKN. As a child, she enjoyed seeing new stars emerge and read numerous books on the subject.

"I was more interested in popular culture than studying," she said with a laugh. "Loving to read books has been a great help in managing actors. In high school, I was part of the broadcasting club, and in college, I was part of the film club. In middle school, I loved shows and attended many performances. Sometimes, there were dancers behind the singers, and there was one person who stood out as a great dancer. That person gradually became even better and started dancing right next to the singers. I thought, 'Wow, they finally succeeded. I had my eye on them...' There were people I admired like that, and that person was none other than Mi-ae of Chuli and Miae."

After retaking the exam in 1990, Park was accepted into Myongji University's Department of English Literature. During her college years, she developed a keen interest in photography and actively participated in a film club. Additionally, she joined a model agency and model center, where she worked part-time while capturing images of models. Furthermore, prior to graduating from college, she held a position at the Sanulrim theater company. Park believes that her diverse experiences have greatly contributed to her pursuit of a career in management.

In 2006, Park took the comprehensive exam for Hongik University. She took time out of her busy schedule to pursue a master's degree in Advertising and Public Relations at Hongik University Graduate School. In 2011, Park began pursuing a doctorate degree after completing a master's program.

== Career ==
=== Early career as manager ===
After graduating, Park began her career at Nonno fashion company as a marketer. The company went bankrupt six months later, leaving her jobless. Subsequently, she opened a bar called "Alcohol Tank" in Hannam-dong, but it struggled financially. She was later recruited by Star Search, a management company under Saehan Media (Samsung Group), through a recommendation from her former team leader at Nonno. In 1994, Park was selected during the second round of open recruitment for Star Search, which represented actors such as Kim Hye-soo, Shin Eun-kyung, Lee Jae-ryong, Yoo Ho-jeong, Choi Min-sik, and Yum Jung-ah. Star Search typically hired graduates from top universities for their management team, but Park was an exception.

I was able to meet "Ku-chong" Choi Min-sik, who casually asked if I had any coins in front of the coffee vending machine, and Shin Eun-kyung, a boyish resident at a general hospital who would go crazy like a child and focus on a game when she inadvertently glanced at the person sitting next to her while working. Even the innocent appearance of singer Lim Jae-beom, who ran between office partitions holding a toy rifle and making 'du-du-du' sounds."

— Park Seong-hye, Women's Newspaper Interview

Her initial experiences as a manager were challenging. She started as a manager for Yum Jung-ah before becoming Kim Hye-soo's manager. Known for frequently changing managers due to dissatisfaction, Kim's first impression of Park was critical; she described Park's appearance in an interview as, "Wearing a studded leather jumper and a leather skirt, her hair was like Tina Turner's, and her makeup was like a chimera. Since this woman was my manager, I thought the company had lost its mind." At the time, Kim Hye-soo was already an established star, and Park worked as a 'rookie road manager' with a modest salary of 500,000 won. Her responsibilities included answering calls and accompanying Kim on film sets. However, Park did not drive, requiring Kim to drive herself. Initially, Kim was not fond of Park's working style, which created tension in their relationship. In time, they grew closer through shared interests in music, which helped improve their rapport.

An incident involving a mistake with plane tickets led to a delay in a commercial filming team's departure. Kim Hye-soo responded positively to the situation, expressing her desire for rest despite the financial implications. Park learned valuable managerial skills from Kim, who provided opportunities and a supportive environment.

Park also managed Jeon Do-yeon, who initially perceived her as somewhat arrogant but later became close friends with her. Jeon was particular about script deliveries and finances, but their relationship deepened over time. Park observed that Jeon preferred to form deep connections with a few individuals rather than engage in large social gatherings. Park also mentioned that when choosing roles, Jeon tends to be attracted to characters that are relatable and likable on a human level.

After a few years, Star Search closed down. Park continued to work with Kim Hye-soo while also managing three new actors. She later joined IS 201, a company founded by shoemaker Esquire (Note: Now Hyungji Esquire, a subsidiary of Fashion Group Hyungji.), which eventually went bankrupt. Park then became Jeon Do-yeon's personal manager and later reunited with Kim Hye-soo.

In 1999, while managing Kim Hye-soo and Jeon Do-yeon, Park encountered Ji Jin-hee, a photographer, and persuaded him to pursue an acting career. After a year of encouragement, Ji Jin-hee transitioned to acting and achieved success, particularly with MBC's Jewel in the Palace.

=== SidusHQ ===
In 2000, Park joined management agency Sidus HQ after resigning from Sambu Finance. She became the head of Team Management 3, which included top stars Kim Hye-soo and Jeon Do-yeon, as well as promising newcomer Ji Jin-hee. Sidus HQ, formerly EBM Production Co, was originally established in April 1999 by producer Teddy Hoon-tak Jung, and merged with Uno Film (now Sidus Pictures) in 2000 to form Sidus HQ Co., Ltd. In the early 2000s, Sidus HQ managed the popular K-pop group g.o.d in collaboration with Park Jin-young of JYP Entertainment. They also focused on managing prominent actors like Kim Ji-ho, Jung Woo-sung, and Park Shin-yang, as well as rookies such as Jang Hyuk, Cha Tae-hyun and Jun Ji-hyun.

In 2002, Sidus HQ separated itself from Sidus FnH (now Sidus Pictures) and established itself as an independent entertainment company. Park remained employed at Sidus HQ. That same year, notable actors such as Sol Kyeong-gu, Kim Seung-woo, Son Chang-min, Shin Min-a, Zo In-sung, Choi Ji-woo, Lee Eun-ju, and Han Jae-suk joined the company. In 2003, Jeon Do-yeon after a five-year hiatus with the SBS drama Shoot for the Stars. This signaled a change in Park's management strategy, especially in terms of connecting with a younger demographic. "I used to be concerned that appearing on TV could harm the actor's brand image. But audience tastes change quickly, and if you're not in the spotlight, you can quickly fade into obscurity," Park explained.

In 2004, Gong Hyo-jin, Kim Sun-a, Kim Soo-ro, Yum Jung-ah, Kim Sung-soo, and Gong Yoo joined the agency. Other actors who later joined the agency include Gye Seong-yong, Kim Gwang-il, Kim Min-kyo, Kim Ji-hye, Kim Hyo-joo, Park Yoon-hee, Park Jeong-hak, Son Tae-young, Danny Ahn, Yang Jin-woo, Ye Ji-won, Oh Joo-eun, Yoo Mi, Yoo Sun, Yoon Kye-sang, Yoon Jin-seo, Lee Hoon, Lee Ki-woo, Lee Mi-yeon, Lee Beom-soo, Lee Sa-bi, Lee Jong-hyuk, Lee Chung-ah, Im Soo-jung, Lim Jeong-eun, Lim Hyun-kyung, Lim Hyeong-jun, Jeon Jae-hyung, Jeong Lee-min, Jo Sang-ki, Jo Young-gyu, Zo In-sung, Jo Han-na, Choi Yun-young, Hong Kyung-in, and Hwang Jung-min. With over 50 members, it was the largest management company in Korea.

In 2005, Sidus HQ actively sought to expand their talent roster by signing several new artists. On April 8, they welcomed Song Hye-kyo, signing her to an exclusive 3-year contract worth 300 million won. Later, on May 20, they also signed exclusive three-year contracts with talent Han Go-eun and Jo Yoon-hee. Sung Yu-ri joined in June, and Kim Jung-hwa became a part of the agency in July after her contract with the former agency Dream Factory ended. Sidus HQ emerged as the top choice for many celebrities entering the free agent market in 2005. By August, about 70 stars, including top names like Jun Ji-hyun, Song Hye-kyo, Sung Yu-ri, Kim Hye-soo, Jeon Do-yeon, Jung Woo-sung, Jang Hyuk, and Zo In-sung, belonged to Sidus HQ. In December, Kim Seo-hyung also signed a three-year contract with the agency. In that same month, Kim Sung-hoon, who debuted in the 2003 film Madeleine, signed with SidusHQ and adopted the stage name Ha Jung-woo on their recommendation. Sidus HQ emerged as the top entertainment company in Korea, with their actors Kim Sun-a, Jeon Do-yeon, and Hwang Jung-min sweeping the 2005 year-end awards.

Voices of concern were growing due to the rapid and aggressive expansion of the management industry in 2005. In 2005, concerns were raised about the rapid and aggressive expansion of the management industry. Chungmuro producers were particularly dissatisfied with Sidus HQ, which had significant negotiating power with top stars. This led to criticism from producers who felt that Sidus HQ was leveraging actors to boost the management company's power excessively. However, some viewed Sidus HQ as a model for latecomer management companies to emulate.

In 2005, Park advanced to become the head of the management business division. Park's team included actors recognized for their acting skills, such as Hwang Jung-min, Im Soo-jung, Gong Hyo-jin, Yoon Jin-seo, Kim Sung-soo, Gong Yoo, Yum Jung-ah, and Ha Jung-woo. That same year, Park participated in a public hearing on the Personal Information Protection Act, highlighting a case of false celebrity information leakage that underscored societal insensitivity toward personal information and human rights.

"[Park] Seong-hye, you are my partner officially and my friend personally, right? It's been so long. Anyway, it seems that work comes first with Seong-hye. Because trust has been built in work, we have become open with each other personally. Trusting Seong-hye as a person, as a partner, and thinking that she is different from other managers is not because she is outstanding in business. Seong-hye is close to the human essence of her actors, the essence of them as actors. The relationship between a manager and an actor can be very diverse. However, Seong-hye can align with the actor's desired direction, the essence the actor wants to have as an actor, and identity, rather than external success and popularity. That's why we can be on the same page when working. Because of her, she can truly understand the actor Kim Hye-soo."

— Kim Hye-soo, Cine21 2007 Interview, Kim Hye-soo answered Park Seong-hye's question

Park advanced to become the head of the management business division and later in 2006 the content business division. She is recognized for her attention to detail, swift grasp of market trends, and adept assessment of each actor's position and career path. Her duties included script reading, with her desk frequently overflowing with scripts. She commented on the challenge of managing the volume, stating, "There are so many scripts that it's hard to read. These are the ones I'll read today. Eighty percent of the management work is rejection." Her habit of extensive reading has honed her ability to evaluate scripts and scenarios effectively.

During Park's tenure as director of the content division, IHQ, the parent company, achieved a market capitalization exceeding 300 billion won. By 2006, Sidus HQ emerged as the largest management company in Korea. This growth was attributed to many prominent figures in Korean entertainment being affiliated with the company, managing over 90 stars and newcomers, and engaging in various business ventures. Considering the size of the popular culture market, Sidus HQ reached a level comparable to that of Creative Artists Agency in the United States and Yoshimoto Kogyo in Japan.

As Sidus HQ's director, Park expressed her thoughts on her actors' appearances, stating, "When we say 'he/she has a good face,' it may mean that they are pretty and handsome to anyone, but the so-called face of an actor is a bit different. For example, in the case of Cho Seung-woo or Ji Jin-hee, their faces may not be handsome at first glance, but as you add some color, it seems like that color will come out, and their eyes are deep, suggesting that there is a lot they want to express. They seem to need space and to exude their own emotions. Whether it's Choi Min-soo's charisma or Park Hae-il's naturalness and confidence."

Under her leadership, Sidus HQ assigns two exclusive acting coaches to train and mentor subgroups of trainees and rookies, who attend acting classes twice a week. Additionally, the trainees receive vocal training through pansori classes. Upon completion of the trainee period and signing a formal contract, they gain access to auditions for TV dramas, movies, commercials, etc., facilitated by the company. However, success in these auditions is determined by the individual's qualities, potential, and attitude. The signing of contracts by management companies varies based on the rookie's attributes. Management companies offer audition opportunities, but the outcome depends on the individual.

From 2008 to 2009, Park was listed as an advisory member of the Busan International Film Festival and a director of the Korea Entertainment Management Association.

=== Sabbatical in the United States ===
Park resigned from her position as manager at Sidus HQ in 2008 to pursue a sabbatical in the United States. During her tenure at Sidus HQ, she handled hundreds of calls per day, managed her schedule, and interacted with a lineup of dozens of actors, conducting meetings with officials. She mentioned that the most challenging aspect was 'rejecting' people. Upon leaving for the United States, she declared, "I will never be a manager again!"

Park cited several reasons for her departure, including dissatisfaction with the industry's focus on money. Park believed that the management industry had become overly fixated on financial gain, leading to a lack of balance and ethical concerns. A personal setback also influenced her decision - a breakup with an actor she managed deeply affected her, causing her to question her career path. She expressed, "Out of the 150 actors I worked with, he was the only one who left me and went to another company." This incident greatly shook her pride and made her doubt her life as a manager.

Additionally, Park wanted to explore new opportunities and learn about herself outside of the demanding world of talent management. During her time in Manhattan, New York, Park embraced new experiences, including learning to ride a bicycle, writing a blog, and pursuing bartending certification. She also discovered a passion for dancing. Her time abroad allowed her to gain a fresh perspective on life and explore her own interests beyond the pressures of her former career.

=== Stars Don't Shine on Their Own - Please Take Care of a Star ===
Park returned after spending about a year in Manhattan, New York. In 2010, she published a book titled Stars Don't Shine on Their Own: Please Take Care of the Star. The book chronicles the joys, sorrows, challenges, and experiences she encountered during her 15-year journey in the industry. It provides insights into her career at Sidus HQ, from her early days with the company until her departure, summarizing her extensive managerial experience.

"We have something tender between us. Because we started together from the beginning. We were lacking in many ways, relied on each other a lot, fought together, and went through our youth together. It's still special to me."

— Kim Hye-soo, about her relationship with Park Seong-hye (Biz Enter Interview)

In her book, Park emphasizes the importance of the partnership between stars and managers. She highlights her long-term tenures as a manager for actors Kim Hye-soo and Jeon Do-yeon, lasting 15 and 12 years, respectively. Park advises that both parties must enter the relationship with an understanding that development and dissolution are possible, depending on their goals. She stresses the need to establish a win-win structure that benefits both sides. In response to public praise regarding actress Kim Hye-soo's romantic relationship, Park expressed about whether the praise was warranted, highlighting a prejudice that suggests all actresses prioritize careers over relationships. She explained that this is not the case, stating, "There are more actresses who don't have that preference."

Park discusses the rewards and challenges of being a manager. She expresses joy when new talents she managed gain recognition, but also speaks to the difficulties of having her thoughts misunderstood or distorted. She notes that in her field, 99% of the jobs involve rejection, and it pains her to turn away from the sincere eyes of people she knows.

Park stated, "During my time as a manager, I had the confidence that if I couldn't persuade the actor, I couldn't persuade anyone else. Managers often use the phrase 'between coldness and passion' when advising their juniors, but they tend to either be influenced by the actor or solely represent the actor's perspective. It's a delicate balance that must be struck. That's where the excitement lies, but being a manager also presents the greatest challenge."

=== Oh! Boy Project ===
Aside from writing her book, Park embarked on two new ventures. During the day, she studied advertising and public relations at Hongik University, while at night, she socialized at clubs near the university. Her time in New York fostered a love for indie music, leading her to frequent smaller performances. After returning to Seoul, she sold her property in Gangnam and opened a bar in Hongdae, featuring performances in the basement and a café on the first floor. She aimed to connect with indie bands, such as Hanryang. Despite dedicating herself to her studies and earning a scholarship for the first time, Park soon realized that indie music was not her chosen path. She felt her initial view of the culture was overly optimistic and struggled to find a suitable business model within the Hongdae indie scene.

Shifting her focus, Park started weekly gatherings with friends in her basement, dubbed "B1," where they enjoyed drinks. Feeling that simply drinking was not engaging enough, she suggested brainstorming original ideas and sharing them anonymously on YouTube. This idea was well received. It was during one of these gatherings that Park proposed the "Oh Boy" concept, which ultimately evolved into the "Flower Boy Project." She was motivated by competition with companies like SM Entertainment and a lingering regret from her time at Sidus HQ. Additionally, she noted a lack of aspiring young actors during an era when singers were gaining global recognition, observing a dearth of talent below the caliber of Song Joong-ki and Yoo Ah-in, along with insufficient female representation.

In April 2011, she established a production company called Oh! Boy Project and began pioneering a new initiative known as audition reality program the Flower Boy Casting, Oh! Boy.

I had a desire to train 'acting idols' under the brand Oh Boy. The reaction of the B1 family, which consists of advertisers, writers, and filmmakers, was mixed. Two months after coming up with the idea, I started my first company. Another winning move. Terrestrial broadcasters knocked on cable's door without paying attention. "It's a pretty boy project, but we decided that if we wanted to capture something rough and vivid, we couldn't do it properly on terrestrial television. CJ happened to be hosting Superstar so it seemed like they knew the importance of discovering human content. "I was confident that there was no way they would reject the Oh Boy project because it was a young broadcasting station."

Park developed a proposal for a project based on a romance novel, having researched and read 20 novels. She signed a copyright contract for the novel Flower Boy Ramyun Shop and faced challenges during the project's development. Initially, the project struggled but gained viewership following the early cancellation of another show. Another project titled Doc Van! was delayed due to negative feedback. Park produced the "Oh! Boy" series through the Oh! Boy Project. She expanded her scope and started a drama project that reflected her own thoughts. One concept involved rebellious children from Tower Palace for a band story. Although the initial script was rejected for being too niche, she persisted and rewrote it, recruiting inexperienced staff for a fresh perspective. Park emphasized the importance of approaching the project with passion and enjoyment for its success.

Flower Boy Ramyun Shop which aired in 2011, was the first installment of tvN's "Oh! Boy" series, targeting a teenage demographic. Kim Hye-soo made a cameo appearance in the first episode of the drama, facilitated by her relationship with Park. The episode aired on Monday and Tuesday at 11 PM, featuring Kim Hye-soo as a tarot fortuneteller who worked alongside Lee Chung-ah's character, Yang Eun-bi, a student preparing for an entrance exam.

This was followed by Flower Band in 2012, Flower Boys Next Door in 2013 and Dating Agency: Cyrano in 2014. Park stated, "Korea's Flower Boy series was loved and called the 'Ikemen (Pretty Boy) Series' in Japan and the 'Huameinan Series' in China. To celebrate the success, in December 2013, around 50 prominent managers gathered at the Nonhyeon-dong café "bar·2," the office and hangout of Oh! Boy Project. The meeting included members from Oh! Boy Project, Sidus HQ, Management Soop, and King Kong Entertainment, representing a significant portion of the Korean actor community.

In 2015, the Oh Boy Project wrote and produced Exo Next Door, directed by Lee Kwon, known for the film My Ordinary Love Story. The project was invested in by mobile messenger LINE and jointly planned with SM Entertainment. The cast included the boy band Exo and Moon Ga-young.

=== Monster Union ===
In 2016, Park became the CEO of KBS production company Monster Union. The company, which focuses on producing entertainment and dramas, was launched in August 2016. Park's appointment as CEO brought a fresh perspective to the team, as she had experience as a top star manager and had produced popular dramas.

Ahead of the company's August launch, Park shared her vision for the company in an interview for the KBS newsletter. She explained that the name Monster Union symbolized a collaboration among talented producers and highlighted the company's role as a bridge between KBS and external partners. The office for Monster Union was being established in the KBS Media building in Sangam-dong, and discussions for investment and co-production with external production companies were in progress. The company was gearing up to release its first project under the name Monster Union in the upcoming year.

Monster Union brought on board renowned directors from KBS to lead its drama and entertainment departments. Former KBS drama director Moon Bo-hyun was appointed as the head of the drama department, while Seo Soo-min took charge of the entertainment department. The drama department included directors with experience in popular dramas like Bread, Love and Dreams, Neighborhood Lawyer Jo Deul-ho, Seoyoung, My Daughter, Brain, and Descendants of the Sun. Yoo Ho-jin, who had previously directed KBS's 2 Days & 1 Night Season 3, joined as an entertainment director.

The establishment of Monster Union by KBS sparked controversy among outsourced production companies, leading to a statement of condemnation from three industry associations. In response, Park clarified that Monster Union aimed to coexist with outsourced production companies by leveraging KBS's expertise and experience. She emphasized a spirit of cooperation and outlined the company's goal of creating globally recognized content and expanding its cultural content intellectual property (IP) business. Park also mentioned plans to distribute content through various platforms, including the web and apps, in addition to KBS's main channel.

In 2017, Monster Union produced its first drama, Queen for Seven Days.

Park had a moment of self-reflection while watching her self-produced drama, 'Suits' on KBS2. As a diligent viewer, she pays close attention to details in dramas. During one scene where Jang Dong-gun's character meets his mentor, played by Jeon No-min, Park found herself comparing her own experiences. She realized that her mentor in the industry was Kim Hye-soo, a top actress who was the same age as her when they worked together. Park credits Kim Hye-soo for showing her the ropes and providing guidance through her actions. Despite the challenges of being a manager, Park feels fortunate to have had Kim Hye-soo as her mentor and first partner in the industry.

=== Keyeast ===
In November 2018, Park Seong-hye was appointed to lead Keyeast's content business. Reflecting on her tenure at the Keyeast office in Gangnam District, she stated, "Since taking office, we have diligently prepared and created an environment to showcase our works in the coming years. It feels like we have worked hard over the past year to achieve this."

"CEO Park Seong-hye is cool. She is a person who made me rethink the standards of a good adult, not only in work but also personally. When I had to stop for a moment, She gave me confidence, and based on that confidence, I was eventually able to feel stable. I am very fortunate to have met a wonderful adult at an early age."

— Moon Ga-young, Cine21 Interview

In her fifth year as Keyeast's CEO, Park reorganized the company's actor roster and established it as a content studio focused on production capabilities. The roster includes rising young actresses such as Moon Ga-young and Han Sun-hwa. Keyeast's history of showcasing actors in significant roles, including Hyena, The School Nurse Files, and Inspector Koo, reflects Park's management expertise. The drama Hyena marked the return of Kim Hye-soo after four years and director Jang Tae-yu's comeback since My Love from the Star. Park expressed confidence in the project's success, highlighting the strength of this collaboration.

On January 31, 2020, Keyeast announced a transition from the co-CEO system of Park and Shin Pil-soon to having Park as the sole CEO, following Shin's resignation. In 2022, Keyeast appointed Park and Nam So-young as co-CEOs to enhance its content production and artist management businesses. Park continued to lead the company alongside Nam, who previously managed artists at SM Entertainment. In that same year, KeyEast sold the Chinese broadcasting rights for the drama Inspector Koo, starring Lee Young-ae, to Youku, a video-sharing platform under the Alibaba Group.

Keyeast was planning to release a major new drama called When the Stars Gossip. It was also developing plans to adapt a novel into a film called From the Gaze and produce an original series called 1 in N is a Secret. Additionally, Keyeast was expanding by preparing a new original work called Ring My Bell.

In 2023, Park retired from Keyeast. The extraordinary general shareholders' meeting on November 30, 2023, resulted in a complete change of the board members. Park was succeeded by Vice President Jo Ji-hoon as the new CEO, while CFO Jang transitioned to an executive director role at Keyeast.

== Filmography ==
=== Television show ===
List of television show produced by Park
Year	Title		Network	Notes	Ref.
Year	English	Korean	Network	Notes	Ref.
2011	Flower Boy Casting, Oh! Boy	꽃미남 캐스팅, 오! 보이	tvN	Oh!Boy Project; CJ E&M	

=== Television series ===
List of television series produced by Park
Year	Title		Network	Notes	Ref.
Year	English	Korean	Network	Notes	Ref.
2011	Cool Guys, Hot Ramen	꽃미남 라면가게	tvN	Oh!Boy Project; CJ E&M	
2012	Flower Band	닥치고 꽃미남 밴드	tvN	Oh!Boy Project; CJ E&M	
2013	My Cute Guys	이웃집 꽃미남	tvN	Oh!Boy Project; CJ E&M	
2014	Dating Agency: Cyrano	연애조작단; 시라노	tvN	Oh!Boy Project; CJ E&M	
2015	Exo Next Door	우리 옆집에 엑소가 산다	Naver TV	Oh!Boy Project; SM Entertainment; LINE	
2016–2017	Hwarang: The Poet Warrior Youth	화랑	KBS2	Hwarang SPC; Oh!Boy Project	
2017	Queen for Seven Days	7일의 왕비	KBS2	Monster Union; Oh!Boy Project	
2017	Hit the Top	최고의 한방	KBS2	Monster Union; Chorokbaem Media	
2017	Meloholic	멜로홀릭	OCN	Monster Union	
2018	Suits	슈츠	KBS2	Monster Union; EnterMedia Pictures; NBCUniversal Global Distribution	
2018	Are You Human?	너도 인간이니?	KBS2	Monster Union	
2018	Matrimonial Chaos	최고의 이혼	KBS2	Monster Union; The I Entertainment	
2019	At Eighteen	열여덟의 순간	JTBC	Drama House; KeyEast	
2019	Psychopath Diary	싸이코패스 다이어리	tvN	KeyEast	
2020	Hyena	하이에나	SBS TV	KeyEast	
2020	My Dangerous Wife	나의 위험한 아내	MBN	KeyEast	
2020	Hush	허쉬	JTBC	KeyEast; JTBC Studios	
2020–2021	Live On	라이브온	JTBC	KeyEast; JTBC Studios	
2021	Inspector Koo	구경이	JTBC	KeyEast; JTBC Studios	
2021–2022	The One and Only	한 사람만	JTBC	KeyEast; JTBC Studios	
2024	Frankly Speaking	비밀은 없어	JTBC	KeyEast; JTBC Studios	
2025	When the Stars Gossip	별들에게 물어봐를 시작으로	tvN	KeyEast; MYM Entertainment	

=== Web series ===
Web series produced by Park
Year	Title		OTT	Ref.
Year	English	Hangul	OTT	Ref.
2020	The School Nurse Files	보건교사 안은영	Netflix	
2024	Family Matters	가족계획	Coupang Play	
2025	Unmasked	트리거	Disney+	
TBA	Illumination	일루미네이션	TBA	
TBA	One in N is a Secret	N분의 1은 비밀로	TBA	
TBA	Ring My Bell	링마벨	TBA	
TBA	From the Gaze	시선으로부터	TBA	

== Bibliography ==
Book written by Park
Year	Title		Author	Publisher	Published Date	ISBN	Ref.
Year	English	Korean	Author	Publisher	Published Date	ISBN	Ref.
2010	The star doesn't shine by itself Take care of the star	별은 스스로 빛나지 않는다 스타를 부탁해	Park Seong-hye	Cine21	January 10, 2010	ISBN 9788993208634; ISBN 8993208638	
2011	Learned woman: 17 warm life stories of wonderful women who loved 'us' as much as 'me'	배운 녀자: '나'만큼 '우리'를 사랑한 멋진 여자들의 따뜻한 인생 이야기 17)	Go Mi-sook; Kim Yeo-jin; Ryu Eun-sook; Park Seong-hye; Jo Ki-sook; Oh So-hee; Kim Bo-seul; Han Kyung-hee	Cine21	September 23, 2011	ISBN 9788984314993; ISBN 8984314994	

== Accolades ==
=== Awards and nominations ===
Name of publisher, year listed, name of listicle, and placement
Award	Year	Nominated work	Result	Ref.
1st The Women of Time Award (Note: 1st The Women of Time Award award for women's clothing 'Time'. The winners of this award are three people, including Park Seong-hye, general manager of Sidus HQ Management. Director Park is one of the role models that current female college students want to follow, and is a female representative specialist who enjoys widespread popularity. Additionally, Jo Joo-hee, ABC News' global bureau chief, and actress Jang Jin-young were selected as female leaders.)	2007	Park Seong-hye	Won	

=== Listicle ===
Name of publisher, year listed, name of listicle, and placement
Publisher	Year	List	Placement	Ref.
Cine21	2007	Chungmuro Power Filmmaker	67th	

=== State honors ===
Name of country, year given, and name of honor
Country	Ceremony	Year	Honor Or Award	Ref.
South Korea	Korean Popular Culture and Arts Awards (Note: Honors are given at the Korean Popular Culture and Arts Awards, arranged by the Korea Creative Content Agency and hosted by the Ministry of Culture, Sports and Tourism. They are awarded to those who have contributed to the arts and South Korea's pop culture.)	2012	Presidential Commendation	
