= Don't Call Me Ma'am =

2025 South Korean series

- Promotional poster
- Hangul: 다음생은 없으니까
- Lit.: There's No Next Life
- RR: Daeumsaengeun eopseunikka
- MR: Taŭmsaengŭn ŏpsŭnikka
- Genre: Comedy drama
- Written by: Shin Yi-won
- Directed by: Kim Jeong-min
- Starring: Kim Hee-sun; Han Hye-jin; Jin Seo-yeon
- Music by: Kim Nam-yeon
- Country of origin: South Korea
- Original language: Korean
- No. of episodes: 12

Production
- Executive producer: Kim Sang-eun
- Producers: Ahn Seok-jun; Jeong Hoe-seok; Hong Seung-cheol; Kim Ji-yeon; Yoo Sun-mi; Park Chae-won
- Production companies: TME Group; First Man Studio; Megaphone

Original release
- Network: TV Chosun
- Release: November 10 – December 16, 2025

Don't Call Me Ma'am (Korean: 다음생은 없으니까) is a 2025 South Korean comedy drama television series, starring Kim Hee-sun, Han Hye-jin, and Jin Seo-yeon. It aired on TV Chosun from November 10, to December 16, 2025, every Monday and Tuesday at 22:00 (KST). It is also available to stream on Netflix.

== Synopsis ==
No Next Life is a comedy-drama about three friends in their forties, exhausted by the daily routine of raising children and the pressures of work, as they strive for a better, more fulfilling life.

== Cast and characters ==
=== Main ===
- Kim Hee-sun as Jo Na-jeong
- Han Hye-jin as Koo Ju-young
- Jin Seo-yeon as Lee Il-ri

=== Supporting ===
- Yoon Park as Noh Won-bin
- Heo Jun-seok as Byun Sang-gyu
- Jang In-sub as Oh Sang-min
- Kim Young-aee as Seo Kyung-hyun
- Go Won-hee as Hong Ye-na
- Moon Yoo-kang as Eom Jong-do
- Song Seung-ha as Choi Soo-young

=== Special appearance ===
- Han Ji-hye as Yang Mi-sook

== Viewership ==
Don't Call Me Ma'am : South Korea viewers per episode (thousands)

Season	Episode number												Average
Season	1	2	3	4	5	6	7	8	9	10	11	12	Average
1	425	344	454	431	492	527	658	676	652	685	751	722	568

Source: Audience measurement performed nationwide by Nielsen Korea.

Average TV viewership ratings
Ep.	Original broadcast date	Average audience share (Nielsen Korea)	
Ep.	Original broadcast date	Nationwide	Seoul
1	November 10, 2025	1.940% (5th)	2.162% (3rd)
2	November 11, 2025	1.51% (12th)	1.337% (10th)
3	November 17, 2025	2.014% (6th)	2.237% (3rd)
4	November 18, 2025	1.885% (8th)	1.917% (8th)
5	November 24, 2025	2.237% (6th)	2.317% (5th)
6	November 25, 2025	2.209% (7th)	2.141% (7th)
7	December 1, 2025	2.742% (2nd)	2.975% (2nd)
8	December 2, 2025	3.079% (4th)	3.284% (3rd)
9	December 8, 2025	2.952% (2nd)	3.414% (1st)
10	December 9, 2025	3.324% (4th)	3.563% (2nd)
11	December 15, 2025	3.402% (2nd)	3.919% (1st)
12	December 16, 2025	3.501% (2nd)	3.383% (2nd)
Average		2.566%	2.721%
In the table above, the blue numbers represent the lowest ratings and the red numbers represent the highest ratings.; This drama aired on a cable channel/pay TV which normally has a relatively smaller audience compared to free-to-air TV/public broadcasters (KBS, SBS, MBC, and EBS).

== Production ==
=== Development ===
The series is directed by Kim Jeong-min, known for Queen: Love and War (2018), Royal Secret Agent (2020), The Secret Romantic Guesthouse (2023), and written by Shin A-won, who wrote Green Mothers' Club (2020). The series is produced by TME Group, First Man Studio and Megaphone.

=== Casting ===
On June 26, 2025, Kim Hee-sun, Han Hye-jin and Jin Seo-yeon were confirmed as the main cast.
