= Last Summer (TV series) =

2025 South Korean television series

- Promotional poster
- Hangul: 마지막 썸머
- RR: Majimak sseommeo
- MR: Majimak ssŏmmŏ
- Genre: Romantic comedy
- Written by: Jeon Yoo-ri
- Directed by: Min Yeon-hong
- Starring: Lee Jae-wook; Choi Sung-eun; Kim Gun-woo
- Music by: Lim Ha-young
- Country of origin: South Korea
- Original language: Korean
- No. of episodes: 12

Production
- Executive producer: Yoon Jae-hyeok
- Producers: Han Sang-woo; Baek Seung-min; Jeong Yeon-ji
- Editor: Song Eun-jung
- Production companies: Monster Union; Slingshot Studio

Original release
- Network: KBS2
- Release: November 1 – December 7, 2025

Last Summer (Korean: 마지막 썸머) is a 2025 South Korean romantic comedy television series written by Jeon Yoo-ri, directed by Min Yeon-hong. It stars Lee Jae-wook, Choi Sung-eun, and Kim Gun-woo. The drama depicts two souls, one who shuns warmth and one who craves it, in a summer of self-discovery and love. It aired on KBS2 from November 1, to December 7, 2025, every Saturday and Sunday at 21:20 (KST). The drama is also available for streaming on Viki.

== Cast and characters ==
=== Main ===
- Lee Jae-wook as Baek Do-ha / Baek Do-young
  - Kang Ji-yong as young Do-ha / Do-young
1. Baek Do-ha: A talented architect.
2. Baek Do-young: A mysterious figure.
- Choi Sung-eun as Song Ha-gyeong
  - Song Ji-u as young Ha-gyeong

A civil servant in the construction industry.

- Kim Gun-woo as Seo Soo-hyuk

The youngest son of the law firm 'Seo & Joo' and an appellate lawyer.

=== Supporting ===
- Kwon Ah-reum as Yoon So-hee

Do-ha's longtime colleague and friend.

- Ahn Dong-goo as Oh Seung-taek
- Jung Jae-geun
- Chae Dan-bi as Kim Da-ye

Ha-gyeong's junior.

- Choi Byung-mo as Baek Ki-ho

Do-ha's father.

- Kang Seung-hyun as Jeon Ye-eun

== Production ==
Last Summer is directed by Min Yeon-hong, written by Jeon Yoo-ri, and Monster Union and Slingshot Studio co-managed the production.

According to a report by Sports Chosun in August 2024, Lee Jae-wook and Choi Sung-eun are confirmed to star in the series.

The OST singer lineup, which includes Lee Mu-jin, Kim Min-seok, Heize, Paul Kim, Bibi, Ateez, and Illit (Yunah and Minju) was announced by Yum Yum Entertainment on October 23, 2025.

== Viewership ==
Last Summer : South Korea viewers per episode (thousands)

Season	Episode number											
Season	1	2	3	4	5	6	7	8	9	10	11	12
1	504	N/A	N/A	N/A	N/A	N/A	N/A	N/A	N/A	N/A	N/A	N/A

Source: Audience measurement performed nationwide by Nielsen Korea.

Average TV viewership ratings
Ep.	Original broadcast date	Average audience share (Nielsen Korea)	
Ep.	Original broadcast date	Nationwide	Seoul
1	November 1, 2025	2.7% (18th)	2.6% (18th)
2	November 2, 2025	2.2% (27th)	N/A
3	November 8, 2025	1.7% (32nd)	N/A
4	November 9, 2025	1.8% (27th)	N/A
5	November 15, 2025	2.3% (23rd)	N/A
6	November 16, 2025	2.1% (21st)	N/A
7	November 22, 2025	2.1% (29th)	N/A
8	November 23, 2025	1.6% (21st)	N/A
9	November 29, 2025	1.5% (38th)	N/A
10	November 30, 2025	1.7% (34th)	N/A
11	December 6, 2025	2.1% (30th)	N/A
12	December 7, 2025	1.7% (33rd)	N/A
Average		2.0%	— (Note: Due to multiple unpublished ratings, the exact average rating is unknown.)
In the table above, the blue numbers represent the lowest ratings and the red numbers represent the highest ratings.; N/A denotes ratings that were not published.
