= The Affair Was Just the Beginning =

2026 South Korean television series

- Promotional poster
- Hangul: 지금 불륜이 문제가 아닙니다
- Hanja: 只今 不倫이 問題가 아닙니다
- Lit.: The Affair Is Not the Problem Right Now
- RR: Jigeum bullyuni munjega animnida
- MR: Chigŭm pullyuni munjega animnida
- Genre: Black comedy
- Showrunner: Hwang Dong-hyuk
- Written by: Jung Eun-kyung; Park Soo-rin
- Directed by: Lee Chang-hee
- Starring: Kim Hye-soo; Cho Yeo-jeong; Kim Ji-hoon; Kim Jae-chul
- Music by: Hong Dae-sung
- Country of origin: South Korea
- Original language: Korean
- No. of episodes: 8

Production
- Executive producer: Hwang Dong-hyuk
- Production company: Firstman Studio

Original release
- Network: Coupang Play
- Release: July 31 – September 4, 2026

The Affair Was Just the Beginning (Korean: 지금 불륜이 문제가 아닙니다) is a 2026 South Korean black comedy television series written by Jung Eun-kyung and Park Soo-rin, directed by Lee Chang-hee, and starring Kim Hye-soo, Cho Yeo-jeong, Kim Ji-hoon, and Kim Jae-chul. The series follows an influencer couple and a doctor couple undergoing divorce proceedings who become entangled in a complex secret. It premiered on Coupang Play on July 31, 2026, and airs every Friday at 20:00 (KST). It is also available for streaming on Viu in selected regions.

== Cast and characters ==
- Kim Hye-soo as Kyung-hee
- Cho Yeo-jeong as Su-jeong
- Kim Ji-hoon as Jae-hong
- Kim Jae-chul as Bo-seong

== Production ==
=== Development ===
Lee Chang-hee, who helmed Strangers from Hell (2019) and A Killer Paradox (2024), was attached to direct, and the screenplay is co-written by Jung Eun-kyung and Park Soo-rin. The production is handled by Firstman Studio, co-founded by director Hwang Dong-hyuk, who created the acclaim Netflix series Squid Game, and producer Kim Ji-yeon. Hwang serves as both showrunner and executive producer.

=== Casting ===
In September 2025, Kim Hye-soo and Kim Ji-hoon were considering.

In February 2026, Coupang Play confirmed the production of the series and revealed its casting lineup, which includes Kim Hye-soo, Cho Yeo-jeong, Kim Ji-hoon, and Kim Jae-chul.

=== Filming ===
Principal photography began in January 2026, and ended after five months.
