= Heroes Next Door =

2025 South Korean television series

- Promotional poster
- Hangul: UDT: 우리 동네 특공대
- Lit.: UDT: Our Neighborhood Special Forces
- RR: UDT: uri dongne teukgongdae
- MR: UDT: uri tongne t'ŭkkongdae
- Genre: Action comedy
- Written by: Ban Gi-ri; Kim Sang-yoon
- Directed by: Jo Woong
- Starring: Yoon Kye-sang; Jin Seon-kyu; Kim Ji-hyun; Ko Kyu-pil; Lee Jung-ha
- Country of origin: South Korea
- Original language: Korean
- No. of episodes: 10

Production
- Running time: 60 minutes
- Production companies: Studio Genie; HighZium Studio; K-connected; 221b

Original release
- Network: Coupang Play; Genie TV; ENA
- Release: November 17 – December 16, 2025

Heroes Next Door (Korean: UDT: 우리 동네 특공대) is a 2025 South Korean action comedy television series written by Ban Gi-ri and Kim Sang-yoon, directed by Jo Woong, and starring Yoon Kye-sang, Jin Seon-kyu, Kim Ji-hyun, Ko Kyu-pil, and Lee Jung-ha. The series tells the story of a lighthearted joint operation by reserve special-forces veterans who band together not to protect the nation or pursue world peace, but solely for their families and their neighborhood. It aired on ENA from November 17, to December 16, 2025, every Monday and Tuesday at 22:00 (KST). It is also simultaneously streaming on Coupang Play and Genie TV in South Korea.

== Synopsis ==
A group of retired special-forces operatives that includes Choi Kang, Gwak Byung-nam, Jung Nam-yeon, Lee Yong-hee, and Park Jeong-hwan get together to protect their families and the neighborhood of Changri-dong. They have lived all these years as ordinary civilians and now use military training to fight back against unusual incidents, including series of mysterious explosions, and deal with day-to-day life.

== Cast and characters ==
=== Main ===
- Yoon Kye-sang as Choi Kang

A former member of the JDD lethal special operations unit turned insurance investigator.

- Jin Seon-kyu as Gwak Byung-nam

A former HID counter-terrorism unit member who now runs a combined hardware and stationery store and serves as the youth association president of Changri-dong.

- Kim Ji-hyun as Jung Nam-yeon

A former special operations instructor who now runs the Mammoth Mart.

- Ko Kyu-pil as Lee Yong-hee

A former cyber operations soldier who now a special martial arts instructor of Yongmu Dojang.

- Lee Jung-ha as Park Jeong-hwan

A former mortar unit member who now studying at Seoul National University of Science and Technology.

=== Supporting ===
- Heo Joon-seok as Kim Su-il

Nam-yeon's husband and member of the Changri-dong's Ddongsampae.

- Son Ji-yoon as Hwang Mi-kyung

Kang's wife.

- Jung Seok-yong as Oh Chun-bae

Owner of Hanna Laundry and a former rifleman of the Baekma Division.

- Jo Han-chul as Kim Seok-jun

Minister of National Defense who investigates the series of mysterious explosions in Giyun city.

- Han Jae-suk as Lee Geun-cheol

Vice Minister of National Defense.

- Lee Bong-ryun as Na Eun-jae

A member of the National Assembly who rose to fame after handling a major case that once became a major social issue.

- Han Joon-woo as James Lee Sullivan

A Korean-American IT genius with a mysterious past.

- Jo Dong-een as Kim In-seop

A producer who becomes suspicious of an explosion accident that shakes Changri-dong and begins pursuing the truth behind it.

- Baek Hyun-joo as Deaconess Lee

A friendly neighbor and doting mother in Changri-dong.

== Production ==
=== Development ===
Heroes Next Door was developed as a Coupang Play and Genie TV original series, with ENA participating in simultaneous broadcasting. Directed by Jo Woong, known for his previous works such as Justice (2019) and A Virtuous Business (2024), written by Ban Gi-ri, (Note: In early reports, Ban Gi-ri was announced as the creator of the series but later changed to writer.) who penned the Missing: The Other Side series (2020–2023), along with rookie screenwriter Kim Sang-yoon. Studio Genie, HighZium Studio, K-connected, and 221b managed the production support.

=== Casting ===
In March 2025, both Yoon Kye-sang and Jin Seon-kyu were reportedly cast in lead roles, reuniting after nearly eight years since collaborating in the 2017 film The Outlaws. In June 2025, Coupang Play and Genie TV finalized the cast lineup with Yoon, Jin, Kim Ji-hyun, Ko Kyu-pil, and Lee Jung-ha.

=== Filming ===
Principal photography began in June 2025.

== Release ==
The series premiered on November 17, 2025, on Coupang Play, Genie TV, and ENA simultaneously. It airs every Monday and Tuesday at 22:00 (KST).

== Viewership ==
Heroes Next Door : South Korea viewers per episode (thousands)

Season	Episode number										Average
Season	1	2	3	4	5	6	7	8	9	10	Average
1	471	610	890	934	1003	993	1093	1144	1099	1196	943

Source: Audience measurement performed nationwide by Nielsen Korea.

Average TV viewership ratings
Ep.	Original broadcast date	Average audience share (Nielsen Korea)	
Ep.	Original broadcast date	Nationwide	Seoul
1	November 17, 2025	2.004% (2nd)	1.853% (2nd)
2	November 18, 2025	2.465% (3rd)	2.288% (3rd)
3	November 24, 2025	3.664% (2nd)	3.850% (2nd)
4	November 25, 2025	3.752% (2nd)	3.303% (2nd)
5	December 1, 2025	4.398% (2nd)	4.415% (2nd)
6	December 2, 2025	4.204% (2nd)	3.687% (2nd)
7	December 8, 2025	4.523% (1st)	4.255% (1st)
8	December 9, 2025	4.553% (1st)	4.449% (1st)
9	December 15, 2025	4.263% (2nd)	4.314% (2nd)
10	December 16, 2025	4.960% (1st)	4.719% (2nd)
Average		3.879%	3.713%
In the table above, the blue numbers represent the lowest ratings and the red numbers represent the highest ratings.; This drama aired on a cable channel/pay TV which normally has a relatively smaller audience compared to free-to-air TV/public broadcasters (KBS, SBS, MBC, and EBS).
