= Good Luck! (TV series) =

South Korean television series

- Promotional poster
- Also known as: Catch Your Luck
- Hangul: 대운을 잡아라
- RR: Daeuneul jabara
- MR: Taeunŭl chabara
- Genre: Family; Comedy drama
- Written by: Son Ji-hye
- Directed by: Park Man-young; Lee Hae-woo
- Starring: Son Chang-min; Sunwoo Jae-duk; Park Sang-myun; Lee Ah-hyun; Oh Young-sil; Ahn Yeon-hong
- Music by: Choi in-hee
- Country of origin: South Korea
- Original language: Korean
- No. of episodes: 121

Production
- Running time: 30 minutes
- Production companies: Box Media; Monster Union

Original release
- Network: KBS1
- Release: April 14 – October 3, 2025

Good Luck! (Korean: 대운을 잡아라) is a 2025 South Korean television series starring Son Chang-min, Sunwoo Jae-deok, Park Sang-myeon, Lee Ah-hyun, Oh Young-sil, and Ahn Yeon-hong. It aired oo KBS1 from April 14, to October 3, 2025, every Monday to Friday at 20:30 (KST).

== Synopsis ==
The drama tells the turbulent story of three friends in their fifties, one rich, one poor, and one yearning for wealth, and their families.

== Cast ==
=== Main Characters ===
- Son Chang-min as Han Moo-chul

Mi-ja's husband, Tae-ha and Seo-woo's father, as well as Dae-sik and Gyu-tae's friend. Once a day laborer at a construction site, he works daily, oblivious to the value of a wife or raising children. He becomes a building landlord, regularly collecting rent. Desperate for more, he is swindled.

- Sunwoo Jae-duk as Kim Dae-sik

Moo-chul and Gyu-tae's friend who owns a chicken restaurant on the first floor of the Daewon Building.

- Park Sang-myeon as Choi Gyu-tae

Jin-tae's older brother, Min-young's father, as well as Moo-chul and Dae-sik's friend who runs a real estate consulting office. After his wife's death, Gyu-tae strives to provide a stepmother for his son. He owes a lot to Moo-chul, a wealthy real estate agent and an important client. However, Gyu-tae has no choice but to suggest Moo-chul to pay for Min-young's college education.

- Lee Ah-hyun as Lee Mi-ja, Moo-cheol's wife, Tae-ha and Seo-woo's mother, and Hae-sook's friend.

The only daughter of a wealthy family falls in love with a bankrupt day laborer, sending her life into turmoil. Her husband's accident forces her to experience the grief of a life gone wrong for the first time in her life, and she begins to relearn the world.

- Oh Young-sil as Lee Hae-sook

Hae-sook, who lived in Mi-ja's small room, had always felt an inferiority complex towards her. When Dae-sik, whom Mi-ja admired, confessed to Hae-sook, their fateful rivalry seemed to have ended with Hee-sook's victory.

- Ahn Yeon-hong as Hwang Geum-ok

The owner of Dandelion Cafe, Geum-ok is two years younger than Hee-seok and Mi-ja. They attended the same high school and live in the same neighborhood. As a result, she is the only person who knows everything about the past lives of Mo-chul, Gyu-tae, Hae-seok, and Mi-ja.

=== Supporting ===
==== Mo-chul's Family ====
- Park Ji-sang as Han Chae-ha

Seo-woo's older brother as well as Mo-chul and Mi-ja's oldest son.

- Lee So-won as Han Seo-woo

Tae-ha's younger sister, Mo-chul and Mi-ja's second daughter, as well as Seo-jin's lover.

==== Daesik's Family ====
- Yoon Ji-hyung as Kim Seo-jin, Dae-sik and Hae-seok's older son.
- Kim Hyoun-jin as Kim Ah-jin, Mi-jin and Sook-jin's younger sister. The second daughter of Dae-sik and Hae-seok.

==== Gyu-tae's family ====
- Lee Seung-hyung as Choi Jin-tae

Gyu-tae's younger brother, Min-yong's uncle, and the owner of a restaurant called Butttuk.

- An Jun-seo as Choi Min-yong

Gyu-tae's only son. Suffering from heart disease. Jin-tae's nephew.

==== Mi-jin's Family ====
- Gong Ye-ji as Kim Mi-jin

Sook-jin and Ah-jin's older sister, Gwang-sik's wife, Ji-woo's mother, Bok-ja's daughter-in-law, as well as Dae-sik and Hae-seok's eldest daughter. She is a water purifier coordinator.

- Kim Min-seok as Heo Gwang-sik

Mi-jin's husband, Ji-woo's father, Bok-ja's son. He is also the son-in-law of Dae-sik, Hae-seok, Sook-jin, and Ah-jin.

- Park Se-kyung as Park Bok-ja

Gwang-sik's mother and Ji-woo's paternal grandmother. She is also the mother-in-law of Mi-jin, Dae-sik, and Hae-seok.

- Han Seo as Heo Ji-woo

Gwang-sik and Mi-jin's daughter, Bok-ja's biological granddaughter, as well as Dae-sik and Hae-suk's maternal granddaughter. Seok-jin and Ah-jin's nephew.

=== Others ===
- Seo Young as Jang-mi, an evil woman who is one of the conspirators to defraud Moo-chul.

== Viewership ==
Good Luck! : South Korea viewers per episode (millions)

Episodes	Episode number																								
Episodes	1	2	3	4	5	6	7	8	9	10	11	12	13	14	15	16	17	18	19	20	21	22	23	24	25
1-25	2.325	2.054	1.995	1.799	1.717	2.176	2.141	2.001	1.969	1.818	2.036	1.944	1.936	1.972	1.994	1.908	2.067	1.848	1.868	1.863	1.907	1.890	1.941	1.933	1.848
26-50	1.935	1.886	1.878	1.880	2.023	1.831	1.861	1.827	2.043	1.728	2.004	1.747	2.026	1.694	1.884	1.916	1.881	2.057	1.762	1.786	1.936	1.856	1.906	1.829	1.853
51-75	1.939	1.792	1.948	1.998	1.847	1.834	1.940	1.902	1.872	1.891	1.875	1.720	2.033	1.683	2.073	1.996	1.810	1.950	1.779	1.849	1.863	1.767	1.865	1.758	1.734
76-100	1.774	1.735	1.912	1.667	1.680	1.931	1.744	1.815	1.683	2.006	1.942	N/A	1.829	1.995	1.967	1.909	2.137	1.902	1.974	2.108	1.897	2.193	2.000	2.093	2.031
101-121	1.959	2.055	2.048	2.026	2.127	1.959	2.050	2.070	2.060	2.124	2.042	2.100	2.033	2.133	2.161	2.015	2.127	1.961	2.220	2.134	1.956	–			

Source: Audience measurement performed nationwide by Nielsen Korea

Average TV viewership ratings
Ep.	Original broadcast date	Average audience share (Nielsen Korea)	
Ep.	Original broadcast date	Nationwide	Seoul
1	April 14, 2025	12.5%	10.8%
2	April 15, 2025	11.3%	10.0%
3	April 16, 2025	11.0%	9.8%
4	April 17, 2025	10.1%	8.3%
5	April 18, 2025	9.3%	8.4%
6	April 21, 2025	12.0%	10.2%
7	April 22, 2025	12.0%	10.7%
8	April 23, 2025	11.3%	9.6%
9	April 24, 2025	11.1%	9.8%
10	April 25, 2025	10.4%	8.8%
11	April 28, 2025	11.0%	9.1%
12	April 29, 2025	10.5%	9.4%
13	April 30, 2025	10.7%	10.0%
14	May 1, 2025	10.9%	9.4%
15	May 2, 2025	10.7%	10.0%
16	May 5, 2025	10.8%	9.3%
17	May 6, 2025	11.5%	9.9%
18	May 7, 2025	10.2%	8.5%
19	May 8, 2025	10.3%	9.3%
20	May 9, 2025	10.2%	9.1%
21	May 12, 2025	10.6%	9.1%
22	May 13, 2025	10.7%	10.0%
23	Nay 14, 2025	10.9%	9.5%
24	Nay 15, 2025	11.1%	9.4%
25	May 16, 2025	10.6%	9.5%
26	May 19, 2025	10.9%	9.6%
27	May 20, 2025	10.5%	9.2%
28	May 21, 2025	10.9%	9.6%
29	May 22, 2025	10.8%	9.3%
30	May 26, 2025	11.1%	9.4%
31	May 28, 2025	10.4%	9.4%
32	May 29, 2025	10.9%	9.6%
33	May 30, 2025	10.5%	9.0%
34	June 2, 2025	11.4%	10.1%
35	June 4, 2025	9.8%	8.9%
36	June 5, 2025	11.1%	9.6%
37	June 6, 2025	9.8%	8.3%
38	June 9, 2025	11.5%	10.0%
39	June 10, 2025	10.0%	8.8%
40	June 11, 2025	10.8%	9.4%
41	June 12, 2025	11.0%	9.4%
42	June 13, 2025	10.7%	9.2%
43	June 16, 2025	11.3%	9.9%
44	June 17, 2025	10.3%	9.0%
45	June 18, 2025	10.1%	8.1%
46	June 19, 2025	10.8%	9.3%
47	June 20, 2025	10.4%	8.9%
48	June 23, 2025	10.6%	9.1%
49	June 24, 2025	10.4%	9.5%
50	June 25, 2025	10.4%	9.3%
51	June 26, 2025	10.4%	9.4%
52	June 27, 2025	10.2%	9.3%
53	June 30, 2025	10.7%	9.4%
54	July 1, 2025	10.9%	9.7%
55	July 2, 2025	10.3%	9.0%
56	July 3, 2025	9.9%	8.6%
57	July 4, 2025	10.3%	9.5%
58	July 7, 2025	11.0%	9.2%
59	July 8, 2025	10.5%	9.0%
60	July 9, 2025	10.5%	9.5%
61	July 10, 2025	10.3%	9.2%
62	July 11, 2025	9.8%	8.7%
63	July 14, 2025	11.6%	10.2%
64	July 15, 2025	10.0%	8.5%
65	July 16, 2025	11.5%	9.6%
66	July 17, 2025	11.4%	9.7%
67	July 18, 2025	10.4%	8.8%
68	July 21, 2025	11.1%	9.5%
69	July 22, 2025	10.6%	8.8%
70	July 23, 2025	10.1%	9.0%
71	July 24, 2025	10.3%	8.1%
72	July 25, 2025	10.0%	8.5%
73	July 28, 2025	10.5%	8.7%
74	July 29, 2025	10.1%	8.5%
75	July 30, 2025	10.0%	8.6%
76	July 31, 2025	10.1%	8.8%
77	August 1, 2025	9.9%	8.5%
78	August 4, 2025	10.7%	8.9%
79	August 5, 2025	9.3%	8.5%
80	August 6, 2025	9.5%	8.0%
81	August 7, 2025	10.7%	9.2%
82	August 8, 2025	9.6%	8.4%
83	August 11, 2025	10.5%	8.6%
84	August 12, 2025	9.4%	8.0%
85	August 13, 2025	11.3%	9.9%
86	August 14, 2025	10.8%	9.3%
87	August 18, 2025	11.8%	N/A
88	August 19, 2025	10.6%	9.4%
89	August 20, 2025	11.4%	9.9%
90	August 21, 2025	11.0%	9.3%
91	August 22, 2025	10.6%	9.3%
92	August 25, 2025	11.9%	10.3%
93	August 26, 2025	11.0%	9.4%
94	August 27, 2025	10.9%	9.7%
95	August 28, 2025	11.6%	10.0%
96	August 29, 2025	10.4%	8.9%
97	September 1, 2025	11.9%	10.0%
98	September 2, 2025	11.0%	10.1%
99	September 3, 2025	11.2%	10.3%
100	September 4, 2025	11.2%	9.4%
101	September 5, 2025	10.1%	8.5%
102	September 8, 2025	11.5%	9.8%
103	September 9, 2025	11.4%	10.0%
104	September 10, 2025	11.5%	10.0%
105	September 11, 2025	12.2%	10.8%
106	September 12, 2025	11.0%	9.7%
107	September 15, 2025	11.4%	9.5%
108	September 16, 2025	11.7%	10.1%
109	September 17, 2025	11.6%	10.4%
110	September 18, 2025	12.0%	10.3%
111	September 19, 2025	11.3%	10.4%
112	September 22, 2025	11.7%	9.8%
113	September 23, 2025	11.5%	10.0%
114	September 24, 2025	11.9%	10.4%
115	September 25, 2025	12.2%	10.9%
116	September 26, 2025	11.1%	10.1%
117	September 29, 2025	12.1%	10.3%
118	September 30, 2025	11.1%	10.0%
119	October 1, 2025	12.0%	11.0%
120	October 2, 2025	11.7%	10.4%
121	October 3, 2025	10.8%	8.8%
Average		10.6%	— (Note: Due to one unpublished rating, the exact average rating is unknown.)
N/A denotes ratings that were not published.; In the table above, the blue numbers represent the lowest ratings and the red numbers represent the highest ratings.
