= Marie and Her Three Daddies =

South Korean television series

- Hangul: 마리와 별난 아빠들
- RR: Mariwa byeollan appadeul
- MR: Mariwa pyŏllan appadŭl
- Genre: Romantic comedy; Family
- Written by: Seo Yong-soo
- Directed by: Kim Hong-joo
- Starring: Ha Seung-ri; Hyun Woo; Park Eun-hye; Ryu Jin; Hwang Dong-joo; Gong Jung-hwan
- Music by: Choi In-hee
- Country of origin: South Korea
- Original language: Korean
- No. of episodes: 120

Production
- Running time: 35 minutes
- Production companies: Ll Entertainment; Monster Union

Original release
- Network: KBS1
- Release: October 13, 2025 – March 27, 2026

Marie and Her Three Daddies (Korean: 마리와 별난 아빠들) is a 2025-26 South Korean television series starring Ha Seung-ri, Hyun Woo, Park Eun-hye, Ryu Jin, Hwang Dong-joo, and Gong Jung-hwan. The series follows Kang Marie as her lifelong quest to find her father takes an unexpected turn when three men show up out of the blue and completely alter her life. It aired on KBS1 from October 13, 2025, to March 27, 2026, every Monday to Friday at 20:30 (KST). It is also available in selected regions on Kocowa.

== Synopsis ==
Kang Marie learned resilience from her turbulent upbringing. Her world is completely upended when she learns she is a product of sperm donation, even though she found comfort in her relationship with Lee Gang-se. She sets out on a quest for self-awareness, determined to track down her father and safeguard her love.

== Cast and characters ==
=== Main ===
- Ha Seung-ri as Kang Ma-ri / Marie
- Hyun Woo as Lee Gang-se
- Park Eun-hye as Joo Ji-ra
- Ryu Jin as Lee Poong-ju
- Hwang Dong-joo as Kang Min-bo
- Gong Jung-hwan as Jin Ki-shik

=== Supporting ===
- Jung Ae-ri as Eom Gi-boon

The director of Eom Hospital.

- Geum Bo-ra as Yoon Soon-ae

Ma-ri's grandmother.

- Kang Shin-il as Lee Ok-sun

Gang-se and Poong-ju's father.

- Park Hyun-jung as Moon Sook-hee

A financial director of Eom Hospital.

- Jo Hyang-gi as Yoon Eon-kyung

Gi-boon's daughter.

- Yoon Mi-hyang as Kim Mi-kyung

Gi-boon's secretary.

- Kim Young-jae as Pyo Dol-gi

- Lee Ji-yeon as Ahn Soo-sun

Ma-ri's bestfriend.

== Production ==
Marie and Her Three Daddies is directed by Seo Yong-soo, written by Kim Hong-joo, and LI Entertainment and Monster Union co-managed the production.

In July 2025, Ha Seung-ri and Hyun Woo were cast as the lead. On September 2, Park Eun-hye, Ryu Jin, Hwang Dong-joo, and Gong Jung-hwan were confirmed to star. Two days later, Jung Ae-ri, Geum Bo-ra, Kang Shin-il, Park Hyun-jung, Jo Hyang-gi, Yoon Mi-hyang, Kim Young-jae, and Lee Ji-yeon were announced to appear as the supporting role.

== Original soundtrack ==
=== Part 1 ===
Released on October 16, 2025
No.	Title	Lyrics	Music	Artist	Length
1.	"Today is a smiling day" (오늘은 웃는 날)	Coma	Choi Cheol-hoon; Algoboni	Soobin (WJSN)	3:21
2.	"Today is a smiling day" (오늘은 웃는 날; Inst.)		Choi Cheol-hoon; Algoboni		3:21
Total length:					6:42

=== Part 2 ===
Released on October 21, 2025
No.	Title	Lyrics	Music	Artist	Length
1.	"You're really special" (넌 특별하단 말이야)	Go Byeong-sik	Go Byeong-sik; Lee Hyeong-seong	Baegna	3:05
2.	"You're really special" (넌 특별하단 말이야; Inst.)		Go Byeong-sik; Lee Hyeong-seong		3:05
Total length:					6:10

=== Part 3 ===
Released on October 28, 2025
No.	Title	Lyrics	Music	Artist	Length
1.	"To J" (J에게)	Lee Se-geon	Go Byeong-sik; Lee Hyeong-seong	Irun	3:55
2.	"To J" (J에게; Inst.)		Go Byeong-sik; Lee Hyeong-seong		3:55
Total length:					7:50

=== Part 4 ===
Released on November 4, 2025
No.	Title	Lyrics	Music	Artist	Length
1.	"You're enough for me" (당신이면 충분합니다)	Go Byeong-sik	Go Byeong-sik; Yang Won-jun	Yang Ji-eun	4:41
2.	"You're enough for me" (당신이면 충분합니다; Inst.)		Go Byeong-sik; Yang Won-jun		4:41
Total length:					9:22

=== Part 5 ===
Released on November 18, 2025
No.	Title	Lyrics	Music	Artist	Length
1.	"Days when the snow is dazzling" (눈이 부신날들)	Pilseung Bulpae; Ahn Sol-hee	Pilseung Bulpae; Ahn Sol-hee; KHo	Ahn Ye-seul	2:52
2.	"Days when the snow is dazzling" (눈이 부신날들; Inst.)		Pilseung Bulpae; Ahn Sol-hee; KHo		2:52
Total length:					5:44

=== Part 6 ===
Released on November 21, 2025
No.	Title	Lyrics	Music	Artist	Length
1.	"Never Go Back to That Time" (다시는 그때로)	Pilseung Bulpae; Ahn Sol-hee	Pilseung Bulpae; Ahn Sol-hee; Jang Seok-won	Ji Se-hee	3:20
2.	"Never Go Back to That Time" (다시는 그때로; Inst.)		Pilseung Bulpae; Ahn Sol-hee; Jang Seok-won		3:20
Total length:					6:40

== Viewership ==
Marie and Her Three Daddies : South Korea viewers per episode (millions)

Episodes	Episode number																								
Episodes	1	2	3	4	5	6	7	8	9	10	11	12	13	14	15	16	17	18	19	20	21	22	23	24	25
1–25	1.883	1.503	1.801	1.795	1.027	1.823	1.224	1.459	1.593	1.511	1.611	1.584	1.594	1.314	1.410	1.613	1.634	1.729	1.689	1.392	1.683	1.694	1.627	1.772	1.541
26–50	1.657	1.567	1.542	1.734	1.546	1.685	1.698	1.733	1.738	1.716	1.690	1.658	1.709	1.696	1.705	1.823	1.687	1.760	1.836	1.730	1.819	1.805	1.755	1.799	1.569
51–75	1.858	1.813	1.714	2.137	1.912	1.852	1.829	1.335	2.131	1.968	1.882	1.927	1.870	2.057	1.887	1.992	1.974	1.824	1.895	1.758	1.974	1.828	1.954	2.086	1.877
76–100	2.035	1.970	1.865	1.901	1.900	2.093	2.068	2.012	2.133	2.009	2.110	2.087	2.040	2.254	2.127	1.664	1.432	2.010	2.174	2.066	2.124	2.139	2.012	2.162	2.174
101–120	2.382	2.192	2.068	1.980	1.906	1.965	2.075	2.062	2.138	1.807	2.197	2.091	1.924	2.182	2.130	2.121	2.017	2.063	2.017	1.910	–				

Source: Audience measurement performed nationwide by Nielsen Korea.

Average TV viewership ratings
Ep.	Original broadcast date	Average audience share	
Ep.	Original broadcast date	Nielsen Korea	
Ep.	Original broadcast date	Nationwide	Seoul
1	October 13, 2025	10.5% (1st)	9.6% (1st)
2	October 14, 2025	8.5% (1st)	7.1% (1st)
3	October 15, 2025	9.7% (1st)	8.7% (1st)
4	October 16, 2025	10.0% (1st)	8.5% (1st)
5	October 17, 2025	10.0% (1st)	8.6% (1st)
6	October 20, 2025	9.2% (1st)	7.8% (1st)
7	October 21, 2025	7.1% (2nd)	6.5% (3rd)
8	October 22, 2025	8.6% (2nd)	7.3% (3rd)
9	October 23, 2025	9.6% (1st)	8.5% (1st)
10	October 24, 2025	8.6% (2nd)	8.0% (2nd)
11	October 27, 2025	9.0% (1st)	7.3% (2nd)
12	October 28, 2025	8.8% (1st)	7.5% (1st)
13	October 29, 2025	8.8% (2nd)	7.4% (2nd)
14	October 30, 2025	7.6% (2nd)	5.9% (2nd)
15	October 31, 2025	8.0% (2nd)	6.8% (3rd)
16	November 3, 2025	8.8% (1st)	7.3% (1st)
17	November 4, 2025	9.0% (1st)	7.6% (1st)
18	November 5, 2025	9.8% (1st)	8.4% (1st)
19	November 6, 2025	9.4% (1st)	8.0% (1st)
20	November 7, 2025	7.6% (2nd)	7.2% (2nd)
21	November 10, 2025	9.5% (1st)	8.3% (1st)
22	November 11, 2025	9.3% (1st)	8.3% (1st)
23	November 12, 2025	8.9% (1st)	7.7% (1st)
24	November 13, 2025	9.8% (1st)	8.7% (1st)
25	November 14, 2025	8.2% (1st)	8.6% (1st)
26	November 17, 2025	9.3% (1st)	7.8% (1st)
27	November 18, 2025	8.9% (2nd)	7.4% (1st)
28	November 19, 2025	8.8% (1st)	7.4% (1st)
29	November 20, 2025	10.2% (1st)	8.4% (1st)
30	November 21, 2025	8.5% (3rd)	7.2% (2nd)
31	November 24, 2025	9.4% (1st)	7.6% (1st)
32	November 25, 2025	9.5% (1st)	7.3% (2nd)
33	November 26, 2025	9.6% (1st)	8.2% (1st)
34	November 27, 2025	9.7% (1st)	8.0% (1st)
35	November 28, 2025	9.2% (1st)	8.0% (2nd)
36	December 1, 2025	9.4% (1st)	7.7% (1st)
37	December 2, 2025	9.0% (2nd)	7.4% (3rd)
38	December 3, 2025	9.2% (1st)	7.7% (1st)
39	December 4, 2025	9.3% (1st)	7.7% (1st)
40	December 5, 2025	9.0% (2nd)	7.5% (3rd)
41	December 8, 2025	10.0% (1st)	8.4% (1st)
42	December 9, 2025	9.4% (1st)	7.6% (1st)
43	December 10, 2025	9.7% (1st)	8.1% (1st)
44	December 11, 2025	10.0% (1st)	8.3% (1st)
45	December 12, 2025	9.4% (2nd)	8.0% (2nd)
46	December 15, 2025	9.7% (1st)	7.9% (1st)
47	December 16, 2025	9.9% (1st)	8.6% (1st)
48	December 17, 2025	9.7% (1st)	7.9% (2nd)
49	December 18, 2025	9.9% (1st)	8.4% (1st)
50	December 19, 2025	9.0% (2nd)	7.9% (2nd)
51	December 22, 2025	10.3% (1st)	8.4% (1st)
52	December 23, 2025	10.1% (1st)	8.5% (1st)
53	December 24, 2025	9.5% (1st)	8.3% (1st)
54	December 25, 2025	11.6% (1st)	10.2% (1st)
55	December 26, 2025	10.4% (2nd)	8.8% (2nd)
56	December 29, 2025	10.3% (1st)	8.3% (1st)
57	December 30, 2025	10.2% (1st)	8.6% (1st)
58	December 31, 2025	7.0% (3rd)	6.1% (2nd)
59	January 1, 2026	10.9% (1st)	9.0% (1st)
60	January 2, 2026	10.7% (2nd)	9.0% (2nd)
61	January 5, 2026	10.7% (1st)	9.1% (1st)
62	January 6, 2026	10.6% (1st)	8.6% (1st)
63	January 7, 2026	10.4% (1st)	8.6% (1st)
64	January 8, 2026	11.0% (1st)	9.1% (1st)
65	January 9, 2026	10.7% (2nd)	9.3% (2nd)
66	January 12, 2026	11.2% (1st)	9.6% (1st)
67	January 13, 2026	10.8% (1st)	9.4% (1st)
68	January 14, 2026	9.9% (1st)	8.5% (1st)
69	January 15, 2026	10.7% (1st)	9.2% (1st)
70	January 16, 2026	9.6% (3rd)	8.0% (2nd)
71	January 19, 2026	10.9% (1st)	9.0% (1st)
72	January 20, 2026	10.3% (1st)	8.7% (1st)
73	January 21, 2026	11.1% (1st)	9.5% (1st)
74	January 22, 2026	11.3% (1st)	9.5% (1st)
75	January 23, 2026	10.3% (2nd)	9.0% (2nd)
76	January 26, 2026	11.1% (1st)	9.2% (1st)
77	January 27, 2026	10.7% (1st)	9.2% (1st)
78	January 28, 2026	10.4% (1st)	8.9% (1st)
79	January 29, 2026	10.9% (1st)	9.1% (1st)
80	January 30, 2026	10.5% (2nd)	8.6% (2nd)
81	February 2, 2026	11.1% (1st)	9.2% (1st)
82	February 3, 2026	11.2% (1st)	9.8% (1st)
83	February 4, 2026	10.6% (1st)	8.7% (1st)
84	February 5, 2026	11.6% (1st)	9.6% (1st)
85	February 6, 2026	10.8% (2nd)	9.0% (2nd)
86	February 9, 2026	11.3% (1st)	9.3% (1st)
87	February 10, 2026	11.0% (1st)	8.9% (1st)
88	February 11, 2026	11.0% (1st)	9.4% (1st)
89	February 12, 2026	11.7% (1st)	9.6% (1st)
90	February 13, 2026	11.1% (2nd)	9.6% (2nd)
91	February 16, 2026	8.3% (2nd)	7.2% (2nd)
92	February 17, 2026	7.4% (2nd)	6.2% (2nd)
93	February 18, 2026	10.8% (1st)	9.0% (1st)
94	February 19, 2026	11.5% (1st)	9.8% (2nd)
95	February 20, 2026	10.5% (2nd)	8.7% (2nd)
96	February 23, 2026	11.6% (1st)	9.7% (1st)
97	February 24, 2026	11.2% (1st)	9.6% (1st)
98	February 25, 2026	10.8% (1st)	9.7% (1st)
99	February 26, 2026	11.6% (1st)	10.5% (1st)
100	February 27, 2026	11.6% (1st)	10.4% (1st)
101	March 2, 2026	12.6% (1st)	10.6% (1st)
102	March 3, 2026	11.8% (1st)	10.1% (1st)
103	March 4, 2026	11.4% (1st)	10.1% (1st)
104	March 5, 2026	11.0% (1st)	9.6% (1st)
105	March 6, 2026	10.3% (1st)	8.8% (2nd)
106	March 9, 2026	10.5% (1st)	9.1% (1st)
107	March 10, 2026	11.3% (1st)	9.9% (1st)
108	March 11, 2026	11.1% (1st)	9.5% (1st)
109	March 12, 2026	11.5% (1st)	9.2% (1st)
110	March 13, 2026	9.8% (1st)	9.8% (1st)
111	March 16, 2026	11.9% (1st)	9.9% (1st)
112	March 17, 2026	11.0% (1st)	9.3% (1st)
113	March 18, 2026	10.8% (1st)	9.0% (1st)
114	March 19, 2026	11.6% (1st)	9.3% (1st)
115	March 20, 2026	11.2% (1st)	9.8% (1st)
116	March 23, 2026	11.4% (1st)	9.1% (1st)
117	March 24, 2026	11.1% (1st)	9.6% (1st)
118	March 25, 2026	10.9% (1st)	9.0% (1st)
119	March 26, 2026	11.1% (1st)	9.2% (1st)
120	March 27, 2026	10.5% (1st)	8.0% (2nd)
Average		—	—
In the table above, the blue numbers represent the lowest ratings and the red numbers represent the highest ratings.
