= Our Happy Days =

2026 South Korean television series

- Promotional poster
- Hangul: 기쁜 우리 좋은 날
- Lit.: Our Happy Good Day
- RR: Gippeun uri joeun nal
- MR: Kippŭn uri choŭn nal
- Genre: Family; Melodrama
- Written by: Nam Sun-hye
- Directed by: Lee Jae-sang
- Starring: Yoon Jong-hoon; Uhm Hyun-kyung; Shin Jung-yoon; Yoon Da-young
- Music by: Gaemi; Lee Sung-gu
- Country of origin: South Korea
- Original language: Korean
- No. of episodes: 122

Production
- Executive producers: Kim Seung-ha; Choi Sang-yeol; Jeon Ji-woo; Lim Sung-gyun; Gu Sung-mok
- Producers: Park Hye-won; Lee Won-geun
- Running time: 30 minutes
- Production companies: Monster Union; Sayon Media; Contents G

Original release
- Network: KBS1
- Release: March 30 – September 17, 2026

Our Happy Days (Korean: 기쁜 우리 좋은 날) is a 2026 South Korean television series written by Nam Sun-hye, directed by Lee Jae-sang, and starring Yoon Jong-hoon, Uhm Hyun-kyung, Shin Jung-yoon, and Yoon Da-young. The series follows the journey of two couples whose bad relationships take a turn when an unexpected meeting reconnects them, sparked by Jo Eun-ae's AI friend Joy. It aired on KBS1 from March 30 to September 17, 2026, every Monday to Friday at 20:30 (KST).

== Synopsis ==
At the request of his grandfather, Gangsu Group Chairman Goo Gang-su, Goo Gyeol returns home after 10 years to join the succession race for the group. As team leader of Gangsu Construction's Strategic Planning Division, Goo Gyeol fatefully encounters Jo Eun-ae, who's fighting to reclaim her company 'Lucky Joy' seized by Gangsu Construction. Jo Eun-ae's clumsiness leads to a string of awkward blunders, even in front of Goo Gyeol, sparking an intense rivalry between them. Despite their bumpy beginning, a shared incident forces them into an unlikely partnership, and they gradually grow closer.

== Cast and characters ==
=== Main ===
- Yoon Jong-hoon as Goo Gyeol (32)

An architect.

- Uhm Hyun-kyung as Jo Eun-ae (30)

A startup developer with a passion for crafting a human-centric AI world, she maintains an unshakeable optimism despite relentless bullying at home, spreading joy wherever she goes. But a sudden twist puts her life off the rails.

- Shin Jung-yoon as Goo Min-ho (33)

Goo Gyeol's older brother.

- Yoon Da-young as So Seung-ri (31)

The head of the Strategic Planning Division at Gangsu Group.

=== Supporting ===
==== Eun-ae's family ====
- Kim Hye-ok as Kang Yeon-ja

Eun-ae's mother.

- Sunwoo Jae-duk as Jo Eun-hyeong

Eun-ae's father.

==== Goo's family ====
- Yoon Da-hoon as Goo Dae-chi

Goo Gyeol and Min-ho's father, who is the CEO of Gangsu Construction.

- Moon Hee-kyung as Eun Soo-jung

Dae-chi's wife.

==== Seung-ri's family ====
- Lee Sang-sook as Yoo Jung-ran

Seung-ri's mother.

- Jung Ho-bin as Seo Kwon-sik

Seung-ri's father, who is the chief secretary of Gangsu Group.

==== Gang-su's family ====
- Lee Ho-jae as Chairman Goo Gang-su
- Jung Young-sook as Lee Yeong-hwa

Gang-su's second wife.

== Production ==
=== Development ===
The series is family melodrama genre directed by Lee Jae-sang, who helmed My Father Is Strange (2017) and Once Again (2020), and written by Nam Sun-hye, who penned Suji & Uri (2024) and Amor Fati (2021–2022). Monster Union, Sayon Media and Contents G jointly managed the production.

=== Casting ===
The casting of the series began in December 2025 with Uhm Hyun-kyung confirmed as the main lead, while Yoon Jong-hoon was in talks. It was reportedly in discussions to be scheduled as a KBS1 daily drama. Yoon Da-hoon and Moon Hee-kyung were reportedly cast in January 2026. By February 11, 2026, Yoon, Uhm, Shin Jung-yoon, and Yoon Da-young were confirmed to lead the series. Eight actors, including Kim Hye-ok, Sunwoo Jae-duk, Yoon D.H., Moon H.K, Lee Sang-sook, Jeong Ho-bin, Lee Ho-jae, and Jung Young-sook, were revealed 8 days later.

=== Filming ===
The filming was already underway in February 2026, with preparations for the production in full swing.

== Release ==
KBS1 confirmed the premiere date of Our Happy Days to be on March 30, 2026, and will air every Monday to Friday at 20:30 (KST).

== Viewership ==
Our Happy Days : South Korea viewers per episode (millions)

Episodes	Episode number																								
Episodes	1	2	3	4	5	6	7	8	9	10	11	12	13	14	15	16	17	18	19	20	21	22	23	24	25
1–25	1.866	1.826	1.726	1.781	1.552	1.836	1.798	1.644	1.823	1.671	1.845	1.779	1.715	1.743	1.414	1.852	1.716	1.769	1.809	1.593	1.909	1.824	1.619	1.825	1.591
26–50	1.776	1.806	1.702	1.760	1.609	1.925	1.726	1.620	1.793	1.602	1.936	1.786	1.972	1.527	2.036	1.900	1.754	1.826	1.679	1.809	1.690	1.849	1.683	1.888	1.724
51–75	1.637	1.788	1.481	1.840	1.839	1.792	1.885	1.717	1.936	1.814	1.901	2.039	1.758	2.017	1.902	1.881	1.943	1.806	2.011	1.921	1.896	2.027	1.974	2.028	1.992
76–100	1.917	2.152	1.892	2.019	1.905	1.892	2.187	1.861	2.126	1.904	1.861	2.048	1.955	1.956	1.829	1.847	1.859	1.906	1.982	1.961	1.898	2.035	1.868	2.149	1.879
101–122	1.901	2.009	1.939	2.150	1.978	1.909	2.040	2.039	2.008	2.007	1.930	2.055	1.931	2.172	1.945	2.113	2.113	2.027	2.071	1.943	2.008	2.119	–		

Source: Audience measurement performed nationwide by Nielsen Korea.

Average TV viewership ratings
Ep.	Original broadcast date	Average audience share	
Ep.	Original broadcast date	Nielsen Korea	
Ep.	Original broadcast date	Nationwide	Seoul
1	March 30, 2026	10.1% (1st)	8.0% (1st)
2	March 31, 2026	9.7% (1st)	7.7% (1st)
3	April 1, 2026	9.5% (1st)	7.8% (1st)
4	April 2, 2026	9.7% (1st)	7.6% (1st)
5	April 3, 2026	8.1% (1st)	6.3% (3rd)
6	April 6, 2026	10.1% (1st)	8.0% (1st)
7	April 7, 2026	9.6% (1st)	8.3% (1st)
8	April 8, 2026	8.9% (1st)	7.1% (1st)
9	April 9, 2026	9.9% (1st)	8.1% (1st)
10	April 10, 2026	9.4% (1st)	7.9% (2nd)
11	April 13, 2026	10.0% (1st)	8.2% (1st)
12	April 14, 2026	9.7% (1st)	8.5% (1st)
13	April 15, 2026	9.4% (1st)	7.9% (1st)
14	April 16, 2026	9.6% (1st)	8.3% (1st)
15	April 17, 2026	7.6% (2nd)	6.2% (3rd)
16	April 20, 2026	10.1% (1st)	8.3% (1st)
17	April 21, 2026	9.3% (1st)	8.2% (1st)
18	April 22, 2026	9.6% (1st)	7.9% (1st)
19	April 23, 2026	10.1% (1st)	8.6% (1st)
20	April 24, 2026	8.8% (2nd)	7.3% (2nd)
21	April 27, 2026	10.3% (1st)	8.5% (1st)
22	April 28, 2026	9.8% (1st)	8.5% (1st)
23	April 29, 2026	9.1% (1st)	7.9% (1st)
24	April 30, 2026	9.7% (1st)	8.0% (1st)
25	May 1, 2026	8.5% (2nd)	7.1% (3rd)
26	May 4, 2026	9.9% (1st)	8.3% (1st)
27	May 5, 2026	9.5% (1st)	7.8% (1st)
28	May 6, 2026	9.7% (1st)	7.8% (1st)
29	May 7, 2026	9.6% (1st)	8.4% (1st)
30	May 8, 2026	8.9% (2nd)	7.8% (2nd)
31	May 11, 2026	10.3% (1st)	8.7% (1st)
32	May 12, 2026	9.3% (1st)	7.7% (1st)
33	May 13, 2026	9.0% (1st)	7.7% (1st)
34	May 14, 2026	9.7% (1st)	8.2% (1st)
35	May 15, 2026	8.5% (2nd)	7.0% (2nd)
36	May 18, 2026	10.2% (1st)	8.4% (1st)
37	May 19, 2026	9.7% (1st)	7.6% (1st)
38	May 21, 2026	10.7% (1st)	8.8% (1st)
39	May 22, 2026	8.3% (2nd)	6.7% (2nd)
40	May 25, 2026	10.7% (1st)	9.1% (1st)
41	May 26, 2026	10.3% (1st)	8.9% (1st)
42	May 27, 2026	9.6% (1st)	8.5% (1st)
43	May 28, 2026	9.8% (1st)	8.6% (1st)
44	May 29, 2026	9.1% (2nd)	7.5% (2nd)
45	June 1, 2026	10.2% (1st)	8.3% (1st)
46	June 2, 2026	9.5% (1st)	7.8% (1st)
47	June 4, 2026	10.2% (1st)	8.3% (1st)
48	June 5, 2026	9.4% (2nd)	8.5% (2nd)
49	June 8, 2026	10.2% (1st)	8.5% (1st)
50	June 9, 2026	9.3% (1st)	7.8% (1st)
51	June 10, 2026	8.9% (1st)	7.6% (1st)
52	June 11, 2026	9.5% (1st)	7.8% (1st)
53	June 12, 2026	8.4% (4th)	7.3% (4th)
54	June 15, 2026	10.3% (1st)	9.2% (1st)
55	June 16, 2026	10.2% (1st)	9.0% (1st)
56	June 17, 2026	10.2% (1st)	8.9% (1st)
57	June 18, 2026	10.4% (1st)	9.3% (1st)
58	June 19, 2026	9.6% (3rd)	7.2% (3rd)
59	June 22, 2026	10.8% (1st)	9.1% (1st)
60	June 23, 2026	9.9% (1st)	8.2% (1st)
61	June 24, 2026	10.2% (1st)	8.3% (1st)
62	June 25, 2026	11.3% (1st)	9.8% (2nd)
63	June 26, 2026	9.7% (1st)	8.2% (2nd)
64	June 29, 2026	11.0% (1st)	9.2% (1st)
65	June 30, 2026	10.3% (1st)	8.7% (1st)
66	July 1, 2026	10.3% (1st)	8.5% (1st)
67	July 2, 2026	10.8% (1st)	9.3% (1st)
68	July 3, 2026	10.0% (2nd)	8.6% (2nd)
69	July 6, 2026	11.1% (1st)	9.1% (1st)
70	July 7, 2026	10.6% (1st)	8.8% (1st)
71	July 8, 2026	10.5% (1st)	9.2% (1st)
72	July 9, 2026	11.2% (1st)	9.4% (1st)
73	July 10, 2026	10.9% (2nd)	9.5% (2nd)
74	July 13, 2026	10.9% (1st)	9.1% (1st)
75	July 14, 2026	10.9% (1st)	9.3% (1st)
76	July 15, 2026	10.7% (1st)	9.2% (1st)
77	July 16, 2026	11.6% (1st)	10.3% (1st)
78	July 17, 2026	10.1% (2nd)	9.0% (2nd)
79	July 20, 2026	10.9% (1st)	9.1% (1st)
80	July 21, 2026	10.6% (1st)	8.8% (1st)
81	July 22, 2026	10.4% (1st)	8.9% (1st)
82	July 23, 2026	11.7% (1st)	10.4% (1st)
83	July 24, 2026	10.2% (2nd)	8.4% (2nd)
84	July 27, 2026	11.4% (1st)	9.7% (1st)
85	July 28, 2026	10.8% (1st)	8.8% (1st)
86	July 29, 2026	10.1% (1st)	8.4% (1st)
87	July 30, 2026	11.3% (1st)	10.2% (1st)
88	July 31, 2026	10.8% (1st)	9.4% (1st)
89	August 3, 2026	10.3% (1st)	9.0% (1st)
90	August 4, 2026	9.6% (1st)	8.0% (1st)
91	August 5, 2026	9.7% (1st)	8.3% (1st)
92	August 6, 2026	9.7% (1st)	8.4% (1st)
93	August 7, 2026	9.8% (1st)	8.5% (1st)
94	August 10, 2026	10.4% (1st)	8.6% (1st)
95	August 11, 2026	10.5% (1st)	9.0% (1st)
96	August 12, 2026	10.1% (1st)	8.3% (1st)
97	August 13, 2026	10.9% (1st)	8.8% (1st)
98	August 14, 2026	9.8% (1st)	8.4% (2nd)
99	August 17, 2026	11.0% (1st)	9.1% (1st)
100	August 18, 2026	10.0% (1st)	8.1% (1st)
101	August 19, 2026	10.4% (1st)	8.6% (1st)
102	August 20, 2026	10.5% (1st)	8.6% (1st)
103	August 21, 2026	10.4% (1st)	8.5% (2nd)
104	August 24, 2026	11.6% (1st)	9.8% (1st)
105	August 25, 2026	10.8% (1st)	9.0% (1st)
106	August 26, 2026	10.1% (1st)	8.5% (1st)
107	August 27, 2026	11.1% (1st)	9.6% (1st)
108	August 28, 2026	10.8% (1st)	8.9% (1st)
109	August 31, 2026	11.2% (1st)	9.4% (1st)
110	September 1, 2026	10.7% (1st)	9.2% (1st)
111	September 2, 2026	10.4% (1st)	8.9% (1st)
112	September 3, 2026	10.6% (1st)	9.0% (1st)
113	September 4, 2026	10.4% (1st)	9.3% (1st)
114	September 7, 2026	11.4% (1st)	10.3% (1st)
115	September 8, 2026	10.5% (1st)	9.0% (1st)
116	September 9, 2026	10.9% (1st)	9.5% (1st)
117	September 10, 2026	11.0% (1st)	10.0% (1st)
118	September 11, 2026	10.5% (1st)	8.8% (2nd)
119	September 14, 2026	11.5% (1st)	9.6% (1st)
120	September 15, 2026	10.2% (1st)	8.9% (1st)
121	September 16, 2026	10.7% (1st)	9.1% (1st)
122	September 17, 2026	11.3% (1st)	9.9% (1st)
Average		10.1%	8.6%
In the table above, the blue numbers represent the lowest ratings and the red numbers represent the highest ratings.
