= Coupang Play =

South Korean online streaming platform

- Native name: 쿠팡플레이
- Website type: OTT platform
- Available in: Korean
- Predecessor: Hooq
- Headquarters: Seoul
- Area served: South Korea
- Owner: Coupang
- Products: Video on demand, Sports streaming
- Website: www.coupangplay.com (in Korean)
- Users: 8.05 million (As of 2024)
- Launched: December 24, 2020; 5 years ago
- Current status: Active

Coupang Play (Korean: 쿠팡플레이) is a South Korean video on demand over-the-top streaming television service launched by Coupang in December 2020. It is based on the former Hooq's assets. After the 2022 Saturday Night Live Korea sketch lampooning Korean presidential candidates went viral, Coupang Play gained popularity with a reasonable subscription fee compared to other OTT services such as Netflix, Wavve and TVING. Coupang Play is included as part of Coupang's Rocket Wow paid membership.

With 6.34 million subscribers by August 2023, Coupang Play had the fastest year-on-year subscriber growth compared to other streaming platforms. After the addition of sports broadcasting, it had 8.05 million active users by January 2024. Along with live streaming sports, the increase in original programs has drawn more users.

In March 2025, Coupang Play acquired the exclusive South Korean rights to select English-language films and television shows from Max and Warner Bros. Pictures in a distribution deal with Warner Bros. Discovery.

The service became available to general Coupang members as a free ad-supported platform in June 2025.

In June 2025, Coupang Play secured the exclusive broadcasting rights in Korea for major NBA season games starting from the 2025-26 season. In addition, Coupang Play holds exclusive broadcasting rights in Korea for several popular overseas soccer leagues, including the German Bundesliga (2024-25 season) and the Spanish La Liga (2023-24 season).

In July 2026, Coupang Play launched a paid "Premium Pass" to remove advertisements, transitioning its service into a multi-tiered monetization model to offset rising content costs.

== Programming ==
=== Sports ===
==== Football ====
- South Korea national football team
- K League
- Coupang Play Series
- Bundesliga (from 2024–25 season)
- DFB-Pokal
- Carabao Cup
- La Liga (from 2023–24 season)
- Ligue 1
- CONCACAF Champions Cup (2026–present)
- Major League Soccer (2025, Los Angeles FC games only)
- England: Premier League, FA Cup (from 2025–26 season)
- Eredivisie (from 2024–25 season) (Feyenoord matches only)
- AFC (2025–2028)
  - National teams
    - 2026 FIFA World Cup qualification (from third round) (Note: all 10 South Korea matches, plus selected matches)
    - AFC Asian Cup (2023, 2027) (Note: Finals tournament only)
    - 2026 AFC Women's Asian Cup
    - AFC Junior/Youth Championships
      - Men's/boys
        - AFC U-23 Asian Cup
        - AFC U-20 Asian Cup
        - AFC U-17 Asian Cup
      - Women's/girls
        - AFC U-20 Women's Asian Cup
        - AFC U-17 Women's Asian Cup
    - AFC Futsal Championships
      - AFC Futsal Asian Cup
      - AFC U-20 Futsal Asian Cup
      - AFC Women's Futsal Asian Cup
  - Clubs
    - AFC Champions League Elite
    - AFC Champions League Two
    - AFC Women's Champions League
- UEFA (from 2027–28 until 2030–31)
  - UEFA Champions League
  - UEFA Europa League
  - UEFA Conference League
  - UEFA Youth League
  - UEFA Super Cup

==== Other sports ====
- National Football League (shared with NFL Game Pass International on DAZN)
- Formula One
- One Championship
- FIVB Volleyball Women's Nations League

=== Original programming ===
==== Scripted ====
- One Ordinary Day (2021)
- Anna (2022)
- Unicorn (2022)
- Returning Student: Straight-A But F in Love (2022)
- Hit the Spot (2022)
- Decoy (2023)
- Boyhood (2023)
- Hide (2024)
- Cinderella at 2 AM (2024)
- What Comes After Love (2024)
- Family Matters (2024)
- Newtopia (2025)
- Confidence Queen (2025)
- Heroes Next Door (2025)
- Absolute Value of Romance (2026)
- The Affair Was Just the Beginning (2026)

==== Unscripted ====
- Saturday Night Live Korea (2021; moved from tvN)
- Chain Reaction (2022)
- Office Romance (2022)
- Elite League (2023–2024; produced by MBN)
- Shooting Star (2024)
