= Kim Kang-min =

Kim Kang-min may refer to:

- Kim Kang-min (baseball)
- Kim Kang-min (actor, born 1995)
- Kim Kang-min (actor, born 1998)
