= Melo Movie =

2025 South Korean television series

- Promotional poster
- Hangul: 멜로무비
- RR: Mellomubi
- MR: Mellomubi
- Genre: Romantic comedy
- Written by: Lee Na-eun
- Directed by: Oh Chung-hwan
- Starring: Choi Woo-shik; Park Bo-young; Lee Jun-young; Jeon So-nee
- Music by: Park Se-joon
- Country of origin: South Korea
- Original language: Korean
- No. of episodes: 10

Production
- Executive producers: Kwon Mi-kyung; Jang Seo-woo
- Producer: Choi Joon-ho
- Cinematography: Kim Gi-ho; Lee Soo-kwang; Kim Gil-tae
- Editors: Kim Sang-hee; Sa Rang
- Running time: 57—74 minutes
- Production company: Studio N

Original release
- Network: Netflix
- Release: February 14, 2025

Melo Movie (Korean: 멜로무비) is a 2025 South Korean romantic comedy television series written by Lee Na-eun, directed by Oh Chung-hwan, and starring Choi Woo-shik, Park Bo-young, Lee Jun-young, and Jeon So-nee. The series follows the intertwined lives of aspiring young individuals navigating love and challenges. It was released on Netflix on February 14, 2025.

== Synopsis ==
Ko Gyeom is a passionate film enthusiast who dreams of watching every movie ever made. He becomes a film critic, driven by his love for cinema. Kim Mu-bee is an aspiring film director with a complicated past. She's determined to make her mark in the industry, but carries emotional baggage. The two share a connection from the past, but a mysterious incident led them to drift apart. They reconnect 5 years later, with Ko Gyeom moving next door to Kim Mu-bee. This rekindles their feelings, but also brings back old wounds and unresolved issues.

== Cast and characters ==
=== Main ===
- Choi Woo-shik as Ko Gyeom (32 years old)
  - Choi Ye-chan as young Ko Gyeom

An extra who becomes a film critic.

- Park Bo-young as Kim Mu-bee (32 years old)
  - Jo Eun-sol as young Kim Mu-bee

A woman who hates films but becomes a film director.

- Lee Jun-young as Hong Si-jun

A genius unknown composer and Ju-a's ex.

- Jeon So-nee as Son Ju-a

A screenwriter and Si-jun's ex.

=== Supporting ===
- Kim Jae-wook as Ko Jun

Gyeom's older brother.

- Ko Chang-seok as Ma Sang-u

A director.

- Kim Hee-jung as Kang Yeon-ju

Mu-bee's mother.

- Kim Young-woong as Park Sang-sik

Owner of a small video store.

- Cha Woo-min as Woo Jeong-hu
  - Choi Ja-un as young Woo Jeong-hu

=== Special appearances ===
- Kim Da-hwin as Kim Hun-dong

Mu-bee's father.

- Eum Moon-suk as Kang-hun

An actor.

- Han Jae-In as Yu-rim (ep. 4-6)

Si-jun's friend.

== Episodes ==
No.	Title	Directed by	Written by	Original release date
1	"It Will Become Scenic When Dawn Comes"; Transliteration: "Achimi omyeon areumdaul geoya" (Korean: 아침이 오면 아름다울 거야)	Oh Chung-hwan	Lee Na-eun	February 14, 2025
2	"Why So Serious"	Oh Chung-hwan	Lee Na-eun	February 14, 2025
3	"Keep Your Friends Close, But Your Enemies Closer"; Transliteration: "Chingudeul gakkai, heona jeogeun deo gakkai" (Korean: 친구들 가까이, 허나 적은 더 가까이)	Oh Chung-hwan	Lee Na-eun	February 14, 2025
4	"It's Not Your Fault"; Transliteration: "Ne jalmusi aniya" (Korean: 네 잘뭇이 아니야)	Oh Chung-hwan	Lee Na-eun	February 14, 2025
5	"No One Can Prepare You for the Love and the Fear"; Transliteration: "Sarangeun junbi eopsi chajaonda duryeoumgwa hamkke" (Korean: 사랑은 준비 없이 찾아온다 두려움과 함께)	Oh Chung-hwan	Lee Na-eun	February 14, 2025
6	"Happy Ending Is Mine!"	Oh Chung-hwan	Lee Na-eun	February 14, 2025
7	"Thanks for the Adventure Now Go Have a New One"; Transliteration: "Moheomeul hamkke haejwoseo gomawo ije saeroun neoui moheomeul tteonabwa" (Korean: 모험을 함께 해줘서 고마워 이제 새로운 너의 모험을 떠나봐)	Oh Chung-hwan	Lee Na-eun	February 14, 2025
8	"All You Need Is Love"	Oh Chung-hwan	Lee Na-eun	February 14, 2025
9	"We Were Like Strangers Who Knew Each Other Very Well"; Transliteration: "Urineun seororeul jal aneun ibangin gatassda" (Korean: 우리는 서로를 잘 아는 이방인 같았다)	Oh Chung-hwan	Lee Na-eun	February 14, 2025
10	"Life Is a Beautiful, Magnificent Thing, Even to a Jellyfish"; Transliteration: "Haepariegedo salmeun areumdapgo, ungjanghan geot" (Korean: 해파리에게도 삶은 아름답고, 웅장한 것)	Oh Chung-hwan	Lee Na-eun	February 14, 2025

== Production ==
=== Development ===
Director Oh Chung-hwan, who directed Hotel del Luna (2019) and Castaway Diva (2023), and writer by Lee Na-eun, who wrote Our Beloved Summer (2021–2022), teamed up while Studio N managed the production of the series.

=== Casting ===
In 2023, both Choi Woo-shik and Park Bo-young were reportedly cast and positively reviewing it. This marked a reunion between Choi Woo-shik and writer Lee Na-eun. The next year, Lee Jun-young, Jeon So-nee, and Kim Jae-wook were cast to appear. Choi, Park, Lee, and Jeon were confirmed to lead the series in February 2024. On May 29, 2024 it was reported that Cha Woo-min was cast to play the role of Woo Jeong-hu.

== Reception ==
=== Critical response ===
On the review aggregator website Rotten Tomatoes, 100% of 6 critics' reviews are positive, with an average rating of 7.9/10. Carmen Chin of NME rated the series 3 out of 5 stars in her review. Pierce Conran of South China Morning Post graded the series with 3 1/2 out of 5 stars.

=== Accolades ===
Name of the award ceremony, year presented, category, nominee of the award, and the result of the nomination
Award ceremony	Year	Category	Nominee / Work	Result	Ref.
Golden Cinematography Awards	2025	Best Actress (Special Acting Award – OTT Drama Category)	Park Bo-young	Won	
Korea Drama Awards	2025	Excellence Award, Actor	Choi Woo-shik	Nominated	
Korea Drama Awards	2025	Excellence Award, Actor	Lee Jun-young (Note: also nominated for When Life Gives You Tangerines, Weak Hero Class 2, and Pump Up the Healthy Love)	Nominated	
