= Baek Hyun-joo =

South Korean actress (born 1970)

- Born: 22 May 1970 (age 56)
- Other name: Baek Hyeon-joo
- Education: Sogang University - Bachelor of Sociology
- Occupations: Actress; theater actor
- Years active: 1993–present
- Agent: Lead Entertainment

Korean name
- Hangul: 백현주
- RR: Baek Hyeonju
- MR: Paek Hyŏnju

Baek Hyun-joo (Korean: 백현주; born on 22 May 1970) is a South Korean actress. She is alumni of Sogang University, Department of Sociology. She made her acting debut in 2006, since then, she has appeared in number of plays, films and television series. She is known for her roles in The King: Eternal Monarch (2020), Hello, Me! (2021) and The King's Affection (2021). She has acted in films such as: Sunny Again Tomorrow (2018) and Love and Leashes (2022) among others.

== Career ==
Baek Hyun-joo is a graduate in Sociology from Sogang University. She is affiliated to the talent company 'Big Boss Entertainment'. She was first seen on big screen in the 2006 film Family Matters, and then in the films The Last Dining Table and A Big Tiny Step. She made her drama debut in a 2015 web-based comic series Songgot: The Piercer.

In 2020 Baek was cast in SBS fantasy drama The King: Eternal Monarch as Secretary Mo alongside Lee Min-ho and Kim Go-eun.

In 2021 she was seen in Hello, Me! playing a villain Han Ji-sook, the executive director of Joa Confectionart. Her performance was appreciated for her "delicate inner acting". In the same year she appeared in tvN's healing drama You Are My Spring as nurse Oh Mi-kyung.

== Filmography ==
=== Films ===
Year	Title	Role	Notes	Ref.
2001	Waikiki Brothers	Guitar 2		
2006	Family Matters		Guest Role	
2006	The Last Dining Table	Mother		
2009	A Brand New Life	Sister Im		
2010	The Yellow Sea	Garibong pub owner		
2011	Shotgun Love	Pregnant mom		
2011	Champ	Older girl		
2011	A Reason to Live	Nun		
2012	Confession of Murder	Makgeolli house lady owner		
2015	Wild Flowers	Motel owner		
2015	Black Stone			
2016	Split	Yeong-hoon's grandmother		
2018	Sunny Again Tomorrow	Kang Jeom-soon		
2022	Love and Leashes	Jung Ji-woo's mother		

=== Television series ===
Year	Title	Role	Notes	Ref.
2015	Songgot: The Piercer	Han Young-sil		
2016	My Mind's Flower Rain	Oh Choon-sim		
2018	Let's Eat 3			
2018	Tale of Fairy	Kim Geum's mother		
2018	Gangnam Scandal	Park Mak-rye		
2019	The Secret Life of My Secretary	Veronica's mother		
2019	Designated Survivor: 60 Days	Min Hee-kyung		
2019	When the Camellia Blooms	Oh Ji-hyeon		
2019	Diary of a Prosecutor	Jang Man-ok		
2020	Hi Bye, Mama!	Daycare center lunch lady		
2020	Nobody Knows	Im Hee-jung		
2020	The King: Eternal Monarch	Secretary Mo		
2020	Drama Special	Dong-sik's mom	Episode: "One Night"	
2021	Hello, Me!	Han Ji-sook		
2021	Sell Your Haunted House	Chang Hwa-mo		
2021	You Are My Spring	Oh Mi-kyung		
2021	The King's Affection	Court lady Kim		
2022	The Law Cafe	Mrs. Choi		
2023	Heartbeat	Go Ki-suk		
2025	Heroes Next Door	Deaconess Lee		

=== Theater ===
Year	Title	Role	Ref.
2007	Novelist Kubo and the people of Gyeongseong	Sukja	
2008	Dohwagol obscene girl Cheongi	Story teller	
2009	Heart of Science - Balkan Zoo	Yoshi	
2009	Geumnyeo and Jeonghee		
2009	Death (or not)		
2010	My Dog's Life	Identity Checker	
2011	Wedding Reception	railway station	
2019	The Story of the Notice	Kim Soon-hee	
2019	Critic	Volodia	
2020	Find a Family Member	Park Bok-nye	
2023	The Dressing Room	B	
