= Billions (agency) =

South Korean actors agency

- Native name: 빌리언스
- Type: Public
- Traded as: KRX: 044480
- Industry: Entertainment
- Founded: May 23, 1973
- Headquarters: 648 Samseong-ro, Gangnam-gu, Seoul, South Korea
- Area served: South Korea
- Key people: Park Jong-jin (Co-CEO); Shim Hwa-seok (Co-CEO
- Services: Artist Management; Drama and Album Production
- Website: thebillions.co.kr

Billions (Korean: 빌리언스) is a South Korean entertainment agency, film and drama production company. In June 2024, the company changed its name from Blade Entertainment to Billions.

The company is home to many actors and musicians in the South Korean entertainment industry, including Lee Jun-young, Jung Sung-il, Jo Bo-ah, Ko Chang-seok, Kim Sung-kyu, Nam Woo-hyun, Kim Ha-neul, Son Hyun-joo, Jung Eun-ji, and others.

== History ==
Seohung Industrial Company was founded by Kim Deok-seong in 1973 as a latex rubber manufacturing company. It received a Korean Industrial Standards certification mark for its condoms and surgical gloves in 1988, the first domestic company to earn the certification. However, in 1997, the Korea Federation for HIV/AIDS Prevention found that condoms produced domestically were considered "substandard and failed to meet the international standard", including the company's brands Million and Ecstasy. Amid the 1997 Asian financial crisis, Seohung signed contracts to export its condoms to the World Health Organization and United Nations Population Fund. By 2000, the company had a net profit of ₩2.1 billion, with condoms making up 70% of its total revenue. The company was renamed to Unidus in May. It was listed on KOSDAQ the following year.

With the rise of imported condoms and decline of demand for domestically produced condoms in the 1990s, Unidus began to consider entering other markets. In 2017, Kim Sung-hoon, the CEO and largest shareholder at the time, sold his shares and the company was renamed to Biogenetics. It was renamed once more to Gyeongnam Biopharma after acquiring Gyeongnam Pharmaceutical two years later. From April 2021, the company began using the name Blueberry NFT.

Starting from December 2022, the company shifted its focus to entertainment industry and the company name was changed to Blade Entertainment. It then acquired actor management company, Star Village Entertainment and merged with it in March 2023. In July 2023, Shim Hwa-seok took office as the new CEO, along with acquisition (in July 2023) and merger (in September 2023) with J-Flex Entertainment. In June 2024, it merged with subsidiary Blade Music, Blade Creative, and Blade Media, followed by company name change to Billions.

== Artists ==
This lists all artists listed on Billions's official website.

Artists from acquisition of Star Village Entertainment in March 2023 are as follows.

- Park Myung-shin
- Jung Seok-yeong
- Jo Hee-bong

Artists from acquisition of J-Flex in July 2023 are as follows.

- Lee Jun-young
- Nam Woo-hyun
- Ko Chang-seok
- Han Sang-jin
- Kwon So-hyun
- Kim Kang-min
- Park Jeong-woo (born 1995)
- Choi Ji-hye

Artist who has signed contract with either Blade Entertainment (previous name) or Billions are as follows.

- Song Ji-woo (2023–present)
- Lee Kyu-han (2023–present)
- Wang Ji-won (2023–present)
- Lee Il-jun (2023–present)
- Lee Yoo-jun (2023–present)
- Kim Sung-kyu (2024–present)
- Oh Se-young (2024–present)
- Yoon Ji-sung (2024–present)
- Heo Sung-tae (2024–present)
- Son Hyun-joo (2024–present)
- Kim Yong-jun (2024–present)
- Kim Ha-neul (2025–present)
- Jung Eun-ji (2025–present)
- Yu Ha-jin (born 1995) (2025–present)
- Lee Ha-eun (born 1998) (2025–present)
- Park Wan-hyeong (2026–present)
- Yoo Ah-in (2026-present)
- Lee Jung-jin (2026-present)
- Choi Moo-sung
- Kim Ba-da (born 2002)
- Kim Su-a (born 1998)
- Kim Hee-chan
- Park Ji-hoon (born 1980)
- Lee Joo-yeon
- Lim Young-joo
- Jin Ye-a (Jinyea/ZN Laboum)
- Cha Kyu-min (born 1995)
- Choi Min-ho (born 2001)
- Choi Yoon-young

Artist affiliated with XYG Studio, a subsidiary of Billions. As of November 2025, it has been absorbed by the parent company.

- Geum Hae-na
- Kim Jae-cheol
- Jang Yoon-ju
- Jung Sung-il
- Jo Bo-ah
- Ji Hye-won

== Former artists ==
- Park Ji-ah (deceased)

== Production ==
=== Released ===
Year	Title	Media format	Notes	Ref.
2025	Newtopia	Series	Aired on Coupang Play	
2025	Last Dance	Mini-album	Released by Lee Jun-young	
