= Four Hands, Two Sonatas =

2026 South Korean television series

- Promotional poster
- Hangul: 포핸즈
- Lit.: Four Hands
- RR: Pohaenjeu
- MR: P'ohaenjŭ
- Genre: Coming-of-age; Romance; Musical
- Written by: Shin Yi-won
- Directed by: Park Hyun-seok
- Starring: Song Kang; Lee Jun-young; Jang Gyu-ri
- Music by: Kim Joon-seok
- Country of origin: South Korea
- Original language: Korean
- No. of episodes: 12

Production
- Running time: 60 minutes
- Production companies: Studio Dragon; Studio N; Namoo Actors

Original release
- Network: tvN
- Release: August 29 – October 4, 2026

Four Hands, Two Sonatas (Korean: 포핸즈) is a 2026 South Korean television series written by Shin Yi-won and directed by Park Hyun-seok. Set in an arts high school, the series follows the lives of three young people named Kang Pi-o, Choi Jeong-yo, and Hong Jae-in, who meet at an arts high school and explore their friendships, romances, rivalries, and personal growth as they navigate their school days and evolve into accomplished adult classical musicians. It aired on tvN from August 29, to October 4, 2026, every Saturday and Sunday at 21:10 (KST). It is also available for streaming on TVING in South Korea and Netflix globally.

The series was a critical and commercial success both domestically and internationally, with the story being positively received for its solid portrayal of youth, music, and the emotional rivalry between the male leads. During its run, the series maintained its continuous #1 position amongst all television channels in its respective time slot, eventually peaking at 9.4% nationwide on the final episode. Additionally, the series topped the streaming charts on TVING and ranked first on buzzworthy topicality lists from Good Data Corporation for six consecutive weeks, covering its entire airing period.

== Synopsis ==
High school piano prodigy Kang Pi-o is consistently ranked first in both academics and piano proficiency. Usually hailed as a future classical music icon who is ready to lead the world's top piano competitions, his career path begins to falter when he encounters an unexpected rival, Choi Jeong-yo. Jeong-yo is a naturally gifted pianist who abandoned his exceptional talent due to a difficult childhood, but his sudden enrollment at Korea Arts High School makes him face Pi-o, the very pianist who helped rekindle his passion for playing the piano. Jeong-yo is forced to confront the gift he once threw away, forming a friendship with Pi-o in the process.

Completing the trio is Hong Jae-in, a viola major at Korea Arts High School with remarkably sensitive hearing that skillfully recognizes melodies. She is Pi-o's close friend, whose piano playing has captivated her since childhood, and she finds her heart yearning for him. She also befriends Jeong-yo after guiding him to join their school, acknowledging his natural talent for playing the piano.

Centering around three students who attend an arts high school for gifted musicians, they navigate friendship, romance, competition, and personal growth, and their shared passion for music creates a lasting connection that follows them well into adulthood.

== Cast and characters ==
=== Main ===
- Song Kang as Kang Pi-o
  - Jung Min-joon as child Kang Pi-o
  - Park Hoo as young Kang Pi-o (10 years old)

The number-one student at Korea Arts High School. Other than being a childhood piano prodigy who continually achieves first place in both academics and piano proficiency, Pi-o also carries a deep-rooted complex within himself. He is the illegitimate child of a wealthy family, longing to be recognized by his grandfather, who despises him. He practices the piano for ten hours a day, secretly panicking about losing his top spot to Choi Jeong-yo, a piano genius who once outranked him when they were children.

- Lee Jun-young as Choi Jeong-yo
  - Han Ji-an as young Choi Jeong-yo (10 years old)

A piano genius who was born into a tough family, Choi Jeong-yo neglected his talents. One day, his teacher forced him to attend a piano concert, where pianist Kang Pi-o was playing. Jeong-yo was overtaken by a wave of old memories from when he first met Pi-o at a piano competition during their childhood. He then transfers to Korea Arts High School, resumes his piano studies, and forms a blossoming friendship with the pianist he has admired for years.

- Jang Gyu-ri as Hong Jae-in

A viola major at Korea Arts High School who possesses a keen musical sensibility and an exceptional ability to recognize melodies. She has loved Pi-o since they were children, and she admires his abilities as a pianist. One day, she hears Jeong-yo playing the piano and recognizes his natural talent, guiding him to enroll at Korea Arts High School.

=== Supporting ===
==== People around Pi-o ====
- Yoon Se-ah as Kang Ji-hye

Pi-o's mother, who gave birth to him out of wedlock. Coming from a wealthy family of musicians, she is a former ballerina and a graduate of Korea Arts High School. She joined a renowned ballet company in Germany, but then returned to South Korea as a single mother, shocking everyone. She chose to live as a single mother and became fiercely devoted to supporting her son after discovering his extraordinary talent, pushing him to beat Jeong-yo at the piano.

- Jung Jin-young as Kang Seung-woon

Ji-hye's father and Pi-o's grandfather. Born during the Korean War, he is a musical genius who was recognized as a child prodigy by age 7. As a conductor, he is authoritative and controlling, standing at the top with his perfect approach to music. He views his only daughter and grandson as the largest blemishes on his life, looking down on them and despising them throughout their lives, and believing his grandson lacks real talent.

- Seo Jae-hee as Yoon Sun-ju

Seung-woon's second wife and Ji-hye's stepmother. She was a violin major and Ji-hye's senior at Korea Arts High School. After joining Seung-woon's orchestra, she grew to admire and eventually fall in love with him. She persistently pursued him before finally marrying him after the death of his first wife. She serves as director of the Korea Group Cultural Foundation and simultaneously chairs Korea Arts High School, recognizing Jeong-yo's exceptional talent and granting him admission to the school.

==== People around Jeong-yo ====
- Seong No-jin as Choi Gi-taek

Jeong-yo's father, an alcoholic who resents his son. He used to work as a diligent piano tuner before quitting for reasons unknown.

- Lee Myeong-ro as Jo Hyun-cheol

Jeong-yo's older friend who became close to him when they were residing on the streets. He was aware of Jeong-yo's difficult circumstances better than anyone, treating him like a younger brother. Despite being constantly berated by Director Kim, he always lends Jeong-yo part of the money he earns as a loan shark runner, showing his deep care for Jeong-yo as an older brother figure in his life.

- Kim Min as Director Kim

A ruthless loan shark who makes a living by using troubled teenagers and runaways on the streets. Using the money he once lent to Jeong-yo's father as leverage, he openly exploits Jeong-yo.

==== People around Jae-in ====
- Kim Hye-hwa as Han Hyun-jeong

Jae-in's mother and the CEO of a management agency for classical musicians. She founded the agency following a divorce from her wealthy husband, who habitually cheated on her. She harbors hope for her daughter's success, but she dislikes her daughter's childish declarations that she will marry Pi-o. She acknowledges both of them as exceptional artists rather than as people. After meeting Jeong-yo, she realizes that his natural talent is the key to making her daughter a success as her accompanist.

==== Korea Arts High School ====
- Kim Joo-hun as Do Hyeon-soo

A graduate of Korea Arts High School, Hyeon-soo studied in the United States and taught there before returning to Korea, where he was appointed as a university professor. He occasionally offers guidance to Pi-o, reminding him that music is about sincerity and storytelling rather than just perfecting technique, and advising him to pour his emotions into his performances. He later becomes a supportive mentor to Jeong-yo, recognizing him as an unpolished gem after hearing him play, and offers him his practice room and free piano lessons.

- Lee Sang-jun as Yoon Han-rim

A piano major at Korea Arts High School and Pi-o's classmate. He repeatedly teams up with Jang Seok-hwan to bully Pi-o, viewing himself as Pi-o's rival because of an inferiority complex stemming from never being able to surpass him. As a result, he incites the other students to isolate Pi-o in their classroom.

- Yoo Tae-joo as Jang Seok-hwan

A cello major at Korea Arts High School who bullies Pi-o with his friend, Han-rim. He is an enforcer, usually fighting with his fists instead of his words.

=== Special appearances ===
- Yekwon Sunwoo as himself (Ep. 4)
- Ko Chang-seok as Martin Vogel (Ep. 6-7, 9, 11)

== Production ==
=== Development ===
Produced by Studio Dragon, Studio N and Namoo Actors, Park Hyun-seok, who helmed Song of the Bandits (2023) and Knock-Off, was attached to direct, and Shin Yi-won was in charge of the screenplay. Four Hands, Two Sonatas is an original work by Studio N. The series' title refers to a piano term for a four-handed performance.

=== Casting ===
On June 30, 2025, Song Kang was considering the drama as his comeback project following his discharge from the military, and Lee Jun-young was considering it on September 2. In November 2025, Jang Gyu-ri, Kim Joo-hun, Yoon Se-ah, and Jung Jin-young were reportedly cast.

By January 2026, Song, Lee, and Jang were officially confirmed to lead the series.

=== Filming ===
Principal photography began in the second half of 2025 and concluded in July 2026.

== Release ==
Four Hands, Two Sonatas is scheduled to premiere on tvN on August 29, 2026, and will air every Saturday and Sunday at 21:10 (KST). It will also be available for streaming on TVING in South Korea and Netflix globally.

== Marketing ==
On August 7, 2026, tvN announced a special preview event for Four Hands, Two Sonatas in collaboration with the Seoul International Music Festival, inviting fans to focus on the classical music works that depict the journey of the three main characters in the series. The event was held on August 22, 2026, at the Music Square outside of Seoul Arts Center. Eight piano students from Kyung Hee University, Seoul National University, Hanyang University, and the Berklee College of Music paired up and performed four-handed pieces at the venue, followed by solo and four-handed performances from professional pianists Lee Min-sung and Park Ju-young, who gave piano lessons to actors Song Kang and Lee Jun-young prior to filming the series. In addition, Korean singer Jae Yeon performed his original soundtrack for the series titled "Where the Light Stays" live for the first time.

== Original soundtrack ==
=== Part 1 ===
Released on August 30, 2026
No.	Title	Lyrics	Music	Artist	Length
1.	"Through the Moon"	Heon; Jinsol; Leeseon	Heon; Jinsol; Leeseon	Jung Seung-hwan	3:21
2.	"Through the Moon" (Inst.)		Heon; Jinsol; Leeseon		3:21
Total length:					6:42

=== Part 2 ===
Released on September 6, 2026
No.	Title	Lyrics	Music	Artist	Length
1.	"Know You, Feel You"	Kinsha; AllThou	AllThou; Kim Su-hyun	So Soo-bin	3:37
2.	"Know You, Feel You" (Inst.)		AllThou; Kim Su-hyun		3:37
Total length:					7:14

=== Part 3 ===
Released on September 27, 2026
No.	Title	Lyrics	Music	Artist	Length
1.	"Where the Light Stays" (빛이 머무는 곳)	WJKIM	WJKIM; Klozer; Haks; Jung Won-jin	Jae Yeon	3:28
2.	"Where the Light Stays" (빛이 머무는 곳; Inst.)		WJKIM; Klozer; Haks; Jung Won-jin		3:28
Total length:					6:56

== Reception ==
=== Critical response ===
Four Hands, Two Sonatas received generally positive reviews from critics for mixing strong musical performances, dramatic montages, and suspenseful twists with a traditional coming-of-age storyline. Ankita Chandra of t2ONLINE for The Telegraph India rated the series 3.5 out of 5 stars, crediting Song Kang and Lee Jun-young's acting skills for adding depth to the contrast and rivalry between their respective characters. Similarly, Kayti Burt of Time Magazine also noted how the "intense emotional connection" between both male leads is the key factor for viewers to give the series a chance, and Burt bestowed further praise to the series for being "deeply devoted to imparting [its] artistic message".

For Hindustan Times, senior entertainment journalist Monica Yadav rated the series 3.5 out of 5 stars, describing it as a "beautifully crafted drama that uses the classical music world to explore trauma, ambition, and healing". Yadav also stated that while the predictable K-drama tropes are occasionally demonstrated through the plot, the "breathtaking musical sequences" and "complex lead dynamics" present the series as "an absolute standout" and reason to watch. Joel Keller of Decider issued a "STREAM IT" recommendation for the series as well, highlighting how the story took the typical romantic K-drama formula and pointed it in a new direction through good music and friendship.

In South Korea, the series garnered further praise from critics. Editor Park Cheol-woong of LeMonde Diplomatique Korea compared the revenge sequences in the second half of the story to earlier critically acclaimed Korean films, such as Park Chan-wook's Sympathy for Mr. Vengeance and Oldboy along with Kim Jee-woon's A Bittersweet Life and I Saw the Devil. Park also emphasized how the themes of jealousy surrounding natural talent pushed the story to new heights, connoting the relationship between both male leads. Furthermore, pop culture critic and Baeksang Arts Awards judge Jeong Deok-hyun applauded Lee Jun-young's portrayal of Choi Jeong-yo, citing Lee's "intuitive sense of acting" and ability to seamlessly transform from role to role in his personal acting spectrum as a strong point that brought the character to life.

=== Ranking ===
In its first week of airing, Four Hands, Two Sonatas generated buzz in South Korea, achieving a topicality all-kill by ranking first place in both the TV and TV-OTT categories on Good Data Corporation's Fundex chart. Lee Jun-young also ranked first place in both the All Performer and Drama Performer categories, with Song Kang following closely in second place. The series maintained its rank at first place for five more weeks, spending six consecutive weeks at #1 in total. Lee and Song still held their respective ranks as well, and Lee became the first and only actor to remain at #1 for six consecutive weeks in 2026.

=== Viewership ===
According to Nielsen Korea, Four Hands, Two Sonatas premiered with a nationwide viewership rating of 3.4% and a metropolitan area viewership rating of 3.5% on August 29, 2026. By the second episode, the ratings nearly doubled to 5.9% nationwide and 6.1% in the Seoul metropolitan area, with the peak minute soaring to 6.6% nationwide during broadcast. Throughout the subsequent weeks, the series' ratings grew, and the finale recorded 9.4% nationwide and 10.0% in Seoul, along with the peak minute reaching 10.6% nationwide and 11.4% in Seoul. The series received praise for ranking first in viewership ratings amongst cable and general programming channels in the same time slot for 12 consecutive episodes.

For the week of August 31–September 6, 2026, the series officially entered the Top 10 Non-English Shows chart on Netflix, debuting at fifth place with 2 million views. It charted for three weeks.

Four Hands, Two Sonatas Viewership per Netflix
Week	Date	Global Rank (Non-English series)	Viewing time (In hours)	Runtime (In hours) (Note: Two episodes were released weekly for six weeks)	Views (In millions)	Ref.
1	August 31 – September 6, 2026	5th	8,200,000	4.10	2.00	
2	September 7–13, 2026	7th	9,500,000	6.11	1.50	
3	September 14–20, 2026	10th	11,800,000	8.12	1.40	

Four Hands, Two Sonatas : South Korea viewers per episode (millions)

Season	Episode number												Average
Season	1	2	3	4	5	6	7	8	9	10	11	12	Average
1	0.842	1.485	1.098	1.401	1.031	1.701	1.635	1.840	1.691	1.681	1.944	2.259	1.550

Source: Audience measurement performed nationwide by Nielsen Korea.

Average TV viewership ratings
Ep.	Original broadcast date	Average audience share (Nielsen Korea)	
Ep.	Original broadcast date	Nationwide	Seoul
1	August 29, 2026	3.391% (1st)	3.466% (1st)
2	August 30, 2026	5.936% (1st)	6.120% (1st)
3	September 5, 2026	4.444% (1st)	4.409% (1st)
4	September 6, 2026	5.782% (1st)	6.039% (1st)
5	September 12, 2026	4.221% (1st)	4.908% (1st)
6	September 13, 2026	7.318% (1st)	7.374% (1st)
7	September 19, 2026	6.845% (1st)	6.811% (1st)
8	September 20, 2026	7.850% (1st)	7.486% (1st)
9	September 26, 2026	7.171% (1st)	7.318% (1st)
10	September 27, 2026	7.196% (1st)	7.698% (1st)
11	October 3, 2026	8.695% (1st)	9.007% (1st)
12	October 4, 2026	9.374% (1st)	9.994% (1st)
Average		6.519%	6.713%
In the table above, the blue numbers represent the lowest ratings and the red numbers represent the highest ratings.; This drama aired on a cable channel/pay TV which normally has a relatively smaller audience compared to free-to-air TV/public broadcasters (KBS, SBS, MBC, and EBS).

== Accolades ==
=== Awards and nominations ===
Name of the award ceremony, year presented, category, nominee of the award, and the result of the nomination
Award ceremony	Year	Category	Nominee	Result	Ref.
Fundex Awards	2026	Best Actor of TV Drama	Lee Jun-young	Pending	

=== Listicles ===
Name of publisher, year listed, name of listicle, and placement
Publisher	Year	Listicle	Placement	Ref.
Joy News 24	2026	Best Couple	4th (Note: for Song Kang and Lee Jun-young)	
Joy News 24	2026	Best Dramas of 2026	7th (Note: mentioned together with The Legend of Kitchen Soldier and 100 Days of Deception)	
