= Lee Seung-ryong =

South Korean actor (born 1994)

- Born: Lee Seung-woo; September 15, 1994 (age 32); South Korea
- Other name: Lee Seung-woo (이승우)
- Education: Seoul Institute of the Arts
- Occupation: Actor
- Years active: 2018–present
- Agent: 51K

Korean name
- Hangul: 이승룡
- RR: I Seungryong
- MR: I Sŭngnyong
- Website: 51k.com

Lee Seung-ryong (Korean: 이승룡; born September 15, 1994), is a South Korean actor. He made his acting debut in theater in 2015 and made his screen debut in television series My Secret Terrius in 2018.

Formerly known as Lee Seung-woo, he changed his stage name to Lee Seung-ryong on April 17, 2026.

== Filmography ==
=== Film ===
| Year | Title | Role | Ref. |
|---|---|---|---|
| 2026 | The Eyes | Kim Hyun-min | |

=== Television series ===
| Year | Title | Role | Notes | Ref. |
|---|---|---|---|---|
| 2018 | My Secret Terrius | Kim Ji-hoon | | |
| 2020 | The Game: Towards Zero | Go Bong-soo | | |
| 2020 | Extracurricular | Shin Kyung-shik | | |
| 2020–2021 | Hush | Hong Gyu-tae | | |
| 2021 | Racket Boys | Yoon Hyeon-jong (young) | Cameo (Ep. 6) | |
| 2021–2022 | Our Beloved Summer | Lim Tae-hoon | | |
| 2022 | Doctor Lawyer | Choi Yo-sub | | |
| 2023 | Vigilante | Min Seon-wook | | |
| 2024 | Seoul Busters | Jang Tan-sik | | |
| 2024 | Face Me | Seo Kang-ho | | |
| 2025 | Pump Up the Healthy Love | Alex | | |
| 2026 | To My Beloved Thief | Seo Do-hyung/Daechu | | |
