= Please Don't Date Him =

2020 South Korean romantic comedy TV series

- Promotional poster
- Hangul: 제발 그 남자 만나지 마요
- Lit.: Please Don't Meet That Guy
- RR: Jebal geu namja mannaji mayo
- MR: Chebal kŭ namja mannaji mayo
- Genre: Romantic comedy; Science fiction
- Created by: Yoon Sung-ho
- Written by: Yoon Kim; Kim Jeong-hee; Jung Jae-in; Songpyeon
- Directed by: Oh Mi-kyeong
- Creative director: Choi Yoon-jeong
- Starring: Song Ha-yoon; Lee Jun-young; Yoon Bo-mi; Gong Min-jeung
- Theme music composer: Kang Ming-uk; Lim Hyun-ji
- Country of origin: South Korea
- Original language: Korean
- No. of episodes: 10

Production
- Executive producer: Song Jae-young
- Running time: 70 minutes
- Production company: Corner Stone Pictures

Original release
- Network: MBC Every 1
- Release: November 10, 2020 – January 12, 2021

Please Don't Date Him (Korean: 제발 그 남자 만나지 마요) is a 2020 South Korean romantic comedy television series, starring Song Ha-yoon, Lee Jun-young, Yoon Bo-mi and Gong Min-jeung. Directed by Oh Mi-kyeong, this story revolves around Seo Ji-seong (Song Ha-yoon) a household appliances developer who dreams to live a life like a well-designed algorithm. The series premiered on MBC Every 1 on November 10, 2020, and aired every Tuesday at 22:40 (KST) till January 12, 2021.

== Synopsis ==
Seo Ji-seong is an AI-controlled, household appliances developer in Pelican Electronics, who has dreams of living a perfect life like a well-developed computer program.

Working on an Artificial Intelligence refrigerator with voice-activated features, she inserts a super sensor chip which was lost by National Intelligence Service into a refrigerator. This results in the development of an "Ancestral Spirit" program that has the ability to pick out unsavoury or morally bankrupt people instead of telling the freshness of vegetables. So, Ji-seong finds out that her deemed perfect fiancé Jeong-han was actually not her 'Prince Charming'.

One day, Jung Kook-hee, a firefighter, with no social media record, whom the program couldn't analyze, shows up. Ji-seong is skeptical about him, as there is no trace of his past on the internet.

== Cast ==
=== Main ===
- Song Ha-yoon as Seo Ji-seong, Manager of Pelican Electronics 'Voice Recognition Smart Home Appliance Ubiquitous Innovation Development Team' a programmer of the AI controlled home appliances.
- Lee Jun-young as Jung Kook-hee, Whale Fire Station Life Safety Rescue Team Firefighter for 3 years, no social media, no digital convenience.
- Yoon Bo-mi as Moon Ye-seul, Seo Ji-seong's friend, a Pelican quarantine staff.
- Gong Min-jeung as Tak Ki-hyun, owner of organic cafe near Pelican Electronics

=== Supporting ===
Pelican Electronics

- Kang Mal-geum as Hwang Ga-eul, telegram girl, Pelican Electronics secretive girl
- Jeong Min-sung as Oh Byung-Gil
- Kim Ki-ri, as Jegal Su-won, team manager who always raises ideological problems
- Nam Min-woo as Ok Dong-jin, an employee of the development team, a coding man
- Kim Hyun-myung as Cho Yong-hwan, no one knows when he goes to work and when he leaves.
- Park Han-sol as Byun Ha-ri, a subjective intern who takes care of what he did not do.

Dentist friends

- Lee Si-hoon as Bang Jeong-han, the man likes Facebook, Dentist. Ex-boyfriend of Seo Ji-seong.
- Joo Woo-jae as Han Yu-jin, an Instagram-like man, dentist.

Tak Ki-hyun's husband

- Kim Tae-gyeom as Kim Sang-sik, Tak Ki-hyun's husband, old blogging man, an office worker.

Whale Fire Station

- Kim Gyeong-il as Gam Oh Joong, the man likes Tinder, from Whale Fire Station, has three children but always needs love, and finds that love outside.

Others

- Lee Ji-ha as Jung-han's mother
- Shin Ji-yeon as Nurse
- Jung In-gi as Seo Ji Seong Dad
- Hwang Young-hee as Lee Eun-hwa
- Choi Baek-gu as Kim Jin-soo

=== Voice appearance ===
- Kim Myung-jun
- Kim Su-ji

=== Guest appearance ===
- Jo Jae-yoon

== Production ==
=== Casting ===
In June 2020, Song Ha-yoon was cast for her comeback series. Lee Jun-young was cast as the main male lead of the series in the same month. Later in October, Yoon Bo-mi and Gong Min-jung were cast to play supporting roles.

=== Filming ===
The script reading was done in October 2020 as new stills were released. The first teaser was released in the last week of October 2020.

== Original soundtrack ==
Please Don't Date Him

Soundtrack album by Various
- Released: 2020–2021
- Genre: Soundtrack
- Languages: Korean; English
- Label: Danal Entertainment

=== Part 1 ===
Released on November 24, 2020
No.	Title	Lyrics	Music	Artist	Length
1.	"100% (feat. Outsider)"	Kang Min-hyung; Outsider; Ryu Byung-im	Kang Min-gook; Kang Min-hyung; Kang Chang-eui	XUM	2:44
2.	"100%" (inst.)		Kang Min-gook; Kang Min-hyung; Kang Chang-eui		2:44
Total length:					5:28

=== Part 2 ===
Released on December 1, 2020
No.	Title	Lyrics	Music	Artist	Length
1.	"End Game"	Kang Min-gook	Kang Min-gook	Susan	3:50
2.	"End Game" (inst.)		Kang Min-gook		3:50
Total length:					7:40

=== Part 3 ===
Released on December 8, 2020
No.	Title	Lyrics	Music	Artist	Length
1.	"To You Who Will Be Tired" (지쳐있을 너에게)	Lee Jong-soo; Na Byung-soo	Lee Jong-soo; Na Byung-soo	Lee Jun-young	3:20
2.	"To You Who Will Be Tired" (inst.)		Lee Jong-soo; Na Byung-soo		3:20
Total length:					6:40

=== Part 4 ===
Released on December 15, 2020
No.	Title	Lyrics	Music	Artist	Length
1.	"Who I Am"	Lee Jong-soo; Na Byung-soo	Lee Jong-soo; Na Byung-soo	Choi Jin-soul	4:01
2.	"Who I Am" (inst.)		Lee Jong-soo; Na Byung-soo		4:01
Total length:					8:02

=== Part 5 ===
Released on December 22, 2020
No.	Title	Lyrics	Music	Artist	Length
1.	"Dream"	Lee Yi-rang; Zion	TM; Lee Yi-rang	Cignature	3:11
2.	"Dream" (inst.)		TM; Lee Yi-rang		3:11
Total length:					6:22

=== Part 6 ===
Released on December 24, 2020
No.	Title	Lyrics	Music	Artist	Length
1.	"I'll protect you"	noovv	TM; noovv	DANI (Dani)	4:10
2.	"I'll protect you" (inst.)		TM; noovv		4:10
Total length:					8:20

=== Part 7 ===
Released on December 28, 2020
No.	Title	Lyrics	Music	Artist	Length
1.	"You know that"	Maljuk Street Brother	Maljuk Street Brother	Z ye	3:09
2.	"You know that" (inst.)		Maljuk Street Brother		3:09
Total length:					6:18

=== Part 8 ===
Released on December 31, 2020
No.	Title	Lyrics	Music	Artist	Length
1.	"Disgrace" (with Seodo)	Byeongsoo Na, Minok Jung	Jongsoo Lee, Byungsoo Na	Goonia	3:34
2.	"Disgrace" (inst.)		Jongsoo Lee, Byungsoo Na		3:34
Total length:					7:08

=== Part 9 ===
Released on January 4, 2021
No.	Title	Lyrics	Music	Artist	Length
1.	"Nice to see you"	Maljuk Street Brother	Maljuk Street Brother	Jihee Lee	4:30
2.	"Nice to see you" (inst.)		Maljuk Street Brother		4:30
Total length:					9:00

=== Part 10 ===
Released on January 7, 2021
No.	Title	Lyrics	Music	Artist	Length
1.	"All beautiful"	Hojung Kim, 30 Billion	Hojung Kim, Youngmin Kim (Eyelisten), 30 Billion	J.niz	3:09
2.	"All beautiful" (inst.)		Hojung Kim, Youngmin Kim (Eyelisten), 30 Billion		3:09
Total length:					6:18

== Ratings ==
Average TV viewership ratings
Ep.	Original broadcast date	Average audience share	
Ep.	Original broadcast date	Nielsen Korea	
Ep.	Original broadcast date	Nationwide	Seoul
1	November 10, 2020	0.2%	—N/a
2	November 17, 2020	0.3%	—N/a
3	November 24, 2020	0.2%	—N/a
4	December 1, 2020	0.4%	—N/a
5	December 8, 2020	0.6%	—N/a
6	December 15, 2020	0.3%	—N/a
7	December 22, 2020	0.4%	—N/a
8	December 29, 2020	0.2%	—N/a
9	January 5, 2021	0.2%	—N/a
10	January 12, 2021	0.2%	—N/a
Average		0.3%	%
The blue numbers represent the lowest ratings and the red numbers represent the highest ratings.
