= Love and Leashes =

2022 South Korean romantic comedy film

- Official release poster
- Hangul: 모럴센스
- Lit.: Moral Sense
- RR: Moreol senseu
- MR: Morŏl sensŭ
- Directed by: Park Hyun-jin
- Screenplay by: Lee Da-hye; Park Hyeon-jin
- Based on: Webtoon Moral Sense (The Sensual M) by Gyeoul (Winter)
- Starring: Seohyun; Lee Jun-young
- Production company: Seed Film
- Distributed by: Netflix
- Release date: February 11, 2022
- Running time: 118 minutes
- Country: South Korea
- Language: Korean

Love and Leashes (Korean: 모럴센스; RR: Moreol senseu) is a 2022 South Korean romantic comedy film, based on the webtoon Moral Sense by Gyeoul. The film directed by Park Hyun-jin and starring Seohyun and Lee Jun-young, depicts a romance between Ji-hoo, who has everything perfect but has secret BDSM desires, and Ji-woo, a competent public relations team member who finds out about his secret. It was released on Netflix on February 11, 2022, to coincide with Valentine's Day.

== Plot ==
At his new job at a public relations firm, Jung Ji-hoo meets fellow worker Jung Ji-woo, a female manager whom he notices is often undermined and disrespected by her male colleagues. Due to their similar names, a package meant for Ji-hoo is one day mistakenly delivered to Ji-woo's office; she opens it to find a leather collar and leash. Ji-hoo arrives in a panic and claims that the items are meant for his dog, but is exposed when a sex shop coupon falls out of the box.

Ji-hoo later thanks Ji-woo for not telling their colleagues what she saw, whereupon she apologizes for her aggressive behavior toward him, explaining that she has a propensity to boss people around. Mistakenly believing she has just confessed to being a dominant, Ji-hoo implores her to become his mistress. She is shocked by this, having assumed he intended to use the bondage gear on a partner rather than himself.

At a work event, Ji-woo comes across a distraught Ji-hoo, who tearfully admits that he feels shame over his sexual desires due to a previous girlfriend breaking up with him over them. Ji-woo assures him that she does not see him as perverted. He asks her once again if she will be his mistress, but she declines.

Ji-woo later beckons Ji-hoo to her office, where she blindfolds him and asks why he specifically wants her as a mistress. He confesses that he is attracted to her confidence, maturity, and integrity. She agrees to be his mistress while walking home from work that evening and spends the rest of the night researching BDSM. The two sign a contract stating that they will enter into a three-month-long dominant and submissive dynamic with Ji-woo as the dominant partner and Ji-hoo as her submissive.

Word of Ji-woo and Ji-hoo's involvement begins to spread through the office, and her domineering personality begins to show through in her interactions with other co-workers, especially young employee Lee Han, making Ji-hoo jealous. To reassure him, Ji-woo keeps Ji-hoo in the office after hours and begins an impromptu scene involving whipping, bondage, and degradation, very nearly being caught by a security guard. As Ji-woo begins enjoying the sessions more and more, she becomes increasingly confused about the state of her and Ji-hoo's relationship. During an outing, Ji-woo asks Ji-hoo to become her boyfriend, but he declines, claiming that he doesn't date. Ji-woo then receives a call from her friend Hye-Mi, a female submissive who has discreetly called her for help after being cornered by a violent male dom at a BDSM-themed love hotel. They manage to arrive in time and safely take her home.

On the final day of Ji-hoo and Ji-woo's contract, Ji-hoo's ex-girlfriend, Hana, shows up at his house as he is waiting for Ji-woo. Ji-hoo tells Hana that she broke his heart and that he's been terrified to date ever since she left him. Hana leaves after asserting that his selfishness is what has prevented him from finding love. For their final session, Ji-woo puts Ji-hoo in shibari and tells him he may do whatever he wants. He kisses her, but she pushes him away before untying him. He confesses his feelings for her and admits that he has not pursued a relationship out of fear of being hurt. Ji-woo leaves.

Han accidentally emails a recording of one of Ji-woo and Ji-hoo's sessions to the rest of the office. Management decides to let them off with a warning, but when the conversation starts to veer into harassment, Ji-woo attempts to defend herself, only for Ji-hoo to step in and accept full responsibility for the incident. Ji-woo uses their safeword to tell him to stop, but he continues, ultimately proclaiming his feelings for Ji-woo and desire to pursue a romantic relationship with her. Ji-woo convinces Han to vengefully send recordings of various managers having extramarital affairs, leading to their suspension. Ji-woo and Ji-hoo begin to officially date while happily continuing their dominant and submissive relationship.

== Cast ==
=== Main ===
- Seohyun as Jung Ji-woo
- Lee Jun-young as Jung Ji-hoo

=== Supporting ===
- Lee El as Hye Mi, Jung Ji-woo's best friend, dog pub owner
- Seo Hyun-woo as Team Leader Hwang
- Kim Han-na as Yuna, Jiwoo's co-worker
- Lee Suk-hyeong as Woo Hyuk, a part-time worker who is obsessed with a dog pub run by Hye Mi.
- Kim Bo-ra as Hana, Jung Ji-hoo's ex-lover
- Baek Hyun-joo as Jung Ji-woo's mother
- Ahn Seung-gyun as Lee Han, the youngest employee

== Production ==
=== Development ===
In February 2021, at the Netflix content road show 'See What's Next Korea 2021', they announced the production of a romance film tentatively titled as Moral Sense.

=== Casting ===
On March 21, 2021, Netflix confirmed through a press release that it would distribute another Korean original film Moral Sense, based on webtoon of the same name. It further revealed that the romance film would be directed by Park Hyun-jin, and have Seohyun and Lee Jun-young as main leads.

=== Filming ===
On April 19, 2021, Seohyun posted photos from shooting site revealing that filming was in progress.

== Reception ==
The review aggregator website Rotten Tomatoes reported an 80% approval rating, based on 5 reviews with an average rating of 6.20/10.

Kim Junmo writing for OhmyNews stated that the film has a message and the attributes of a romantic comedy. Kim wrote, "as it is a story about the minority taste of BDSM, the difference between likes and dislikes is a limitation of this film." Kim opined, "the barrier to entry is high. Above all, scenes containing BDSM's actions are the core of sympathy between the two main characters, but it is difficult to universally provide emotional pleasure, catharsis, and excitement." Kate Sánchez rated the film with 8.5 out of 10 and wrote, "Love and Leashes is sweet and sensual. It's a wholesome look at boundaries and love while also taking time to explore kink in a context that doesn't treat it as something dangerous or abnormal... one of the best representations of kink I've seen in a film." Ricardo Gallegos of La Estatuilla praised the performances of Seohyun and direction stating, "Park Hyun-jin does a good job of weaving the threads of the story together and adding a touch of respectful humor to the story's development." Concluding Gallegos wrote, "Although "Amarrados al amor" manages to use classic and conventional elements of the romantic comedy genre, it stands out thanks to its sweet handling of the central relationship, the sensuality that it transmits in its exploration of sexual freedom and its honest intentions to inform and break taboos."

James Marsh of the South China Morning Post rated the film with 3 out of 5 stars and praised the performances of the lead pair writing, "Seohyun and Lee Jun-young deliver sweet and wholesome performances". Marsh opined that the film has made "efforts to normalise BDSM and erase its stigma," and it has come out as "a sweet and well-meaning workplace romance". March concluded "Love and Leashes is a commendable effort to lift the blindfold on a stigmatised subculture, albeit without the reward of any lasting gratification."

== Awards and nominations ==
Name of the award ceremony, year presented, category, nominee of the award, and the result of the nomination
Award ceremony	Year	Category	Nominee / Work	Result	Ref.
Baeksang Arts Awards	2022	Best New Actress – Film	Seohyun	Nominated	
