= Brave Citizen =

2023 South Korean film

- Theatrical release poster
- Hangul: 용감한 시민
- RR: Yonggamhan simin
- MR: Yonggamhan simin
- Directed by: Park Jin-pyo
- Screenplay by: Yeo Ji-na; Hyeon Chung-yeol
- Based on: Brave Citizen by Kim Jung-hyun
- Starring: Shin Hye-sun; Lee Jun-young
- Cinematography: Kim Yong-seong
- Edited by: Kim Woo-hyun; Kim Hyun-seo
- Music by: Dalpalan
- Production companies: Finecut; Studio N Content Wavve; VOL Media; Oscar10studio
- Distributed by: Mindmark
- Release date: October 25, 2023
- Running time: 112 minutes
- Country: South Korea
- Language: Korean
- Box office: US$2.1 million

Brave Citizen (Korean: 용감한 시민) is a 2023 South Korean action comedy film directed by Park Jin-pyo. It is an adaptation of the webtoon of the same name. The film follows an aspiring boxer and substitute teacher, Si-min (Shin Hye-sun), who covertly fights against a school bully, Su-gang (Lee Jun-young), by using a mask to conceal her identity.

== Synopsis ==
So Si-min is a passionate teacher who cannot tolerate injustice, yet chooses to live quietly as a contract teacher after running into the harsh walls of reality. However, among the students in her class is Han Su-gang, the ultimate embodiment of arrogance. Taking advantage of Somin's restraint and the neglect of other teachers, he ruthlessly bullies the students and even the staff he considers easy targets. As his cruelty escalates further and crosses the line, Si-min can no longer stand by. By day, she remains a teacher but by night, she transforms into a vigilante, determined to deliver true justice to Su-gang.

== Cast ==
- Shin Hye-sun as So Si-min, a substitute teacher at Mooyoung High and former boxing prodigy. "So Si-min" is a literal translation of "ordinary middle-class citizen" in Korean.
- Lee Jun-young as Han Su-gang, a "ruthless" bully and student, who terrorizes students and faculty at Mooyoung High.
- Park Jung-woo as Go Jin-hyeong, Su-gang's classmate who becomes his main victim to protect his grandmother.
- Park Hyuk-kwon as So Yeong-taek, Si-min's father, a former boxer and part-time deliveryman at a chicken restaurant.
- Cha Chung-hwa as Lee Jae-kyeong, the head teacher at Mooyoung High who helps Si-min.
- Lee Chan-hyeong as Lee Kwon-joong, a police officer and Si-min's neighborhood friend.
- Bae Hyeon-Jun as Lee Byeong-jin, a student at Mooyoung High.
- Cha Woo-min as Lee Moon-ki, a student member of Su-gang's gang who takes part in the bullying.
- Lee Joong-ok as Seo Sang-woo, the owner of the chicken restaurant where Yeong-taek works, and a former boxer.
- Son Sook as Jin-hyeong's grandmother who is tormented by Su-gang and his gang.
- Kang Anna as Song Eun-gyo, a member of Su-gang's gang who films the bullying.
- Lee Kyu-hoe as vice principal.

== Production ==
=== Background ===
In April 2019, Studio N (the production company subsidiary of Naver Webtoon), confirmed that a film adaptation of the Brave Citizen webtoon was going to be made.

The webtoon's creator, Kim Jung-Hyun, was inspired to create the concept for the story from an article he read about a teacher who ignored school violence. The article prompted him to think about how a teacher in that situation would react if they themselves became the victim of bullying.

The film's director, Park Jin-pyo, stated that he worked on developing the theme of school violence from the webtoon into the film two and a half years prior to the phenomenon's renewed attention in South Korea, which occurred prior to the film's release in 2023.

=== Casting ===
On October 9, 2021, Shin Hye-sun was reported to be positively responding to the script after having been offered a role in the film. On November 12, 2021, Studio N announced that Shin and Lee Jun-young had been cast in the leading roles.

Shin trained for 6 months with a martial arts instructor for her character, and confirmed she performed all the action scenes in the film herself. The film is Shin's first action film.

=== Filming ===
In August 2021, it was reported that filming would begin in November of that year. However, later reports in November 2021 indicated that filming would begin in December 2021. Principal photography officially began on December 30, 2021, and concluded on April 5, 2022.

Heo Myeong-haeng, known for being an action direction master choreographed the action sequences for the film.

=== Post-production ===
Deadline reported that South Korean sales company Finecut had acquired the international rights to the adaptation at Busan International Film Festival's Asian Film & Contents Market that took place in October 2022.

== Release ==
Brave Citizen premiered on October 25, 2023, in South Korea. Its North American debut took place at the Fantasia International Film Festival on July 20, 2024. The film was later featured at the 12th Korean Film Festival in Belgium on October 2, 2024.

Its release marked Cha Woo-min's film debut.

== Reception ==
=== Box office ===
The film opened at number two at the local box office, as it sold over 36,000 tickets and grossed approximately 281.8 million ₩ (around US$206,978).

=== Critical response ===
Brave Citizen holds an audience rating of 6.87 on the Korean review aggregator Naver Movie Database, and has a Letterboxd rating of 3.3/5. Expert critics at Cine21 gave it 5 out of 10 stars, while audiences rated it 8/10.

Audiences and critics alike praised Lee Jun-young's villainous portrayal of Han Su-gang.

Critics applauded the film's exploration of school violence. Yoo Seon-ah from Cine21 added that the school violence theme combined with the masked vigilante narrative offers viewers an emotional satisfaction. Cho Kyung-Geon, a journalist from Busan Ilbo, similarly complimented the well-timed theme of school violence, although he noted that the film felt "predictable" at times. Fantasia International Film Festival's Steven Lee remarked that the theme was "explored in a very interesting way".

Scott Phillips from Forbes called Brave Citizen an "action gem" and his favorite film from the Fantasia International Film Festival 2024's first week. David Chew and Golden Lee highlighted the "well choreographed" action scenes as what made viewing Brave Citizen enjoyable. On the other hand, Yoo Seon-ah criticized the multi-angled action sequences, and questioned whether their inclusion fully capitalizes on the strengths of the action genre. Film critic Maxance Vincent expressed a similar attitude to Yoo, stating that while there were a few great action fight moves present, a majority of the action photography looked "more janky than sweeping," and noted that he was unimpressed by the lack of "visual flourish" in the film's final boxing match.
