= Vigilante (TV series) =

2023 South Korean television series

- Hangul: 비질란테
- RR: Bijillante
- MR: Pijillant'e
- Genre: Action thriller
- Created by: Moon Yoo-seok
- Based on: Vigilante by Kim Gyu-sam
- Written by: Lee Min-seop
- Directed by: Choi Jeong-yeol
- Starring: Nam Joo-hyuk; Yoo Ji-tae; Lee Joon-hyuk; Kim So-jin
- Music by: Kim Tae-seong
- Country of origin: South Korea
- Original language: Korean
- No. of seasons: 1
- No. of episodes: 8

Production
- Producer: Michelle Kwon
- Camera setup: Single-camera
- Running time: 40–50 minutes
- Production companies: Studio N; Beyond Story

Original release
- Network: Disney+
- Release: November 8, 2023 – present

Vigilante (Korean: 비질란테) is a South Korean television series created by Moon Yoo-seok. The series stars Nam Joo-hyuk, Yoo Ji-tae, Lee Joon-hyuk and Kim So-jin. It is based on the Naver webtoon of the same name. The first season aired on Disney+ from November 8 to 29, 2023, in selected regions. It is also available for streaming on Hulu in the United States. A second season has been confirmed. Vigilante premiered at the On Screen section of the 28th Busan International Film Festival on October 5, 2023, where three of eight episodes were screened.

== Premise ==
Kim Ji-yong, a student at the police academy in South Korea, becomes the "Vigilante" at night and punishes criminals, who receive light sentences for heinous crimes. Ji-yong's actions catch the attention of Jo Heon, the head of an investigation team. Jo Heon initiates an operation to capture the Vigilante after learning about him through Choi Mi-ryeo, a news reporter, who covers the Vigilante's activities.

== Cast ==
=== Main ===
- Nam Joo-hyuk as Kim Ji-yong

A Korean National Police University student, and the "Vigilante".

- Yoo Ji-tae as Jo Heon

The team leader of the regional investigation unit of the Seoul Metropolitan Police Agency, and known as the "Physical Monster".

- Lee Joon-hyuk as Jo Gang-ok

The vice-chairman of DK Group. He is a fan of the Vigilante, and knows Ji-yong is the Vigilante. He wants to build the Vigilante as a real hero.

- Kim So-jin as Choi Mi-ryeo

A reporter of broadcast station MBS. She sources and reports on news of the Vigilante.

=== Supporting ===
==== Police ====
- Lee Seung-woo as Min Seon-wook

A model student of the Korean National Police University, and Ji-yong's good friend. He was a judo athlete.

- Jo Han-joon as Hwang Joon

A student of the Korean National Police University, and a good friend of Ji-yong and Seon-wook.

- Kwon Hae-hyo as Lee Jun-yeop

A professor of the Korean National Police University.

- Lee Hae-young as Eom Jae-hyub

A police chief who was later transferred to become the principal of the Korean National Police University.

- Won Hyun-jun as Nam Yeong-il

Heon's replacement as the new team leader of the regional investigation unit.

==== Others ====
- Yoon Kyung-ho as Kim Sam-doo

The CEO of Sewool Future Resources. He was acquitted for instigating murders.

- Shin Jung-geun as Mr. Bang

A killer who is experienced and agile.

- Yun Jae-wook as Seo Doo-yeop

A criminal.

- Kim Cheol-yoon as Goo Seong-yeol

An underling of Seo Doo-yeop.

- Kim Dae-gon as Jang Soon-do

=== Special appearance ===
- Jeon Bae-soo as Seok Seung-cheol

The secretary general of the Blue House, and a close associate of Jae-hyub.

== Episodes ==
No.	Title	Original release date
1	"Episode 1"	November 8, 2023
A young Ji-yong witness his mother's death committed by a thug named Choi Sung-soo. Sung-soo was held guilty, but was given a small sentence due to fake evidence. Ji-yong grows up to become a student at National Police Agency and learns that Sung-soo still commits crimes. Ji-yong tracks down Sung-soo and brutally thrashes him. This makes Ji-yong track down and scare criminals, who are released from prison after being given smaller sentences. Choi Mi-ryeo, a broadcast reporter at Repo25h, learns about Ji-yong's vigilante activities during the weekends and dubs him as the Vigilante. The Vigilante story brings more ratings for the channel, leading Mi-ryeo to decide to double down on it. With no activities of Vigilante in the weekends, Mi-ryeo broadcasts an old case in which a perpetrator called Jeong Deok-heung had sexually assaulted So-yoon, but was given a small sentence. Ji-yeong learns about Deok-heung and decides to track him down. After facing embarrassment from society, Deok-heung learns that So-yoon changed her name and is living in an apartment. He tracks her down and tries to kill him, but Ji-yong manages to save So-yoon and brutally thrashes him. Ji-yong makes Deok-heung write an apology letter and leaves the place.
2	"Episode 2"	November 8, 2023
Mi-ryeo baits the Vigilante with more information on the criminals on REPO25h.
3	"Episode 3"	November 15, 2023
Copycat crimes emerge nationwide, and Jo Heon and Mi-ryeo chase after the Vigilante.
4	"Episode 4"	November 15, 2023
The fake Vigilante suggests joining forces, and Heon closes in on the Vigilante's identity.
5	"Episode 5"	November 22, 2023
Mi-ryeo reports on Sewool's alleged crimes, and Ji-yong and Heon come into conflict.
6	"Episode 6"	November 22, 2023
Ji-yong and Gang-ok help Mi-ryeo continue digging into Kim Sam-doo and the Vole.
7	"Episode 7"	November 29, 2023
The Vole tries to bury the case by sacrificing Kim Sam-doo, but Sam-oo retaliates with all he has.
8	"Episode 8"	November 29, 2023
Ji-yong gathers everyone involved in one location, and the final battle begins.

== Production ==
Studio N announced its plan to remake the webtoon Vigilante by Kim Gyu-sam into a film in September 2019. Nam Joo-hyuk was cast to play lead role in the series in April 2022. Yoo Ji-tae gained 20 kg of weight to realistically portray Jo Heon, the head of the metropolitan investigation team chasing Vigilante.

It was confirmed that a second season is in production.

== Release ==
After its premier at the 28th Busan International Film Festival on October 5, Vigilante was released on November 8 in a total of 8 episodes with two episodes available per week every Wednesday.

== Accolades ==
Award	Year	Category	Nominee(s) / work(s)	Result	Ref.
Seoul International Drama Awards	2024	Outstanding Korean Drama	Vigilante	Nominated	
