= Park Han-sol =

South Korean actress (born 1995)

- 박한솔
- Park at 2026 Busan International Film Festival
- Born: 19 July 1995 (age 31); Seoul, South Korea
- Education: Department of Theater and Film of Dongguk University
- Occupation: Actress
- Years active: 2016–present
- Agent: Elephant Entertainment
- Known for: Hospital Playlist; Soul Mechanic; Please Don't Date Him

Korean name
- Hangul: 박한솔
- Hanja: 朴韓率
- RR: Bak Hansol
- MR: Pak Hansol

Park Han-sol (Korean: 박한솔; born 19 July 1995) is a South Korean actress. She is known for her supporting roles in dramas such as Hospital Playlist, Soul Mechanic and Please Don't Date Him.

== Filmography ==
=== Film ===
Year	Title	Role	Ref.
2019	A History of Jealousy	Young Soo-min	
2026	Beach Fictions	Tae-ju	

=== Television series ===
Year	Title	Role	Ref.
2017	Criminal Minds	Son Na-kyung	
2017	Fork You Boss	Han-sol	
2017	Secret Crushes: Special Edition	Park Han-sol	
2018	My First Love	Kim Yun-jeong	
2018	KBS Drama Special: "So Close, Yet So Far"	Yang Hyun-ah	
2018	Drunk in Good Taste	Seul-gi	
2018	Live	Han Jung-oh	
2018	A Poem a Day	Lee Shi-eun	
2018	Fork You Boss 2	Han-sol	
2018	Let's Eat 3	Bak Han-sol	
2018	Risky Romance	Jang Han-ah	
2019	Big Issue	Jang Mi-rae	
2019	Justice	Yeon-hyo	
2019	Catch the Ghost	Park Yoo-mi	
2020	When the Weather Is Fine	Joo-hee	
2020	Hospital Playlist	Sun Woo-heesu	
2020	When My Love Blooms	Yang Hye-jung	
2020	Soul Mechanic	Gong Ji-hee	
2020	Please Don't Date Him	Byun Ha-ri	
2021	She Would Never Know	Lee Se-rim	
2021	Sell Your Haunted House	Joo Hwa-jung	
2021	Hospital Playlist 2	Sunwoo Hee-soo	
2022	Crazy Love	Chu Ok-hee	
2023	Twinkling Watermelon	Eun-ho's girlfriend	
2023	Daily Dose of Sunshine	Na-ra	

=== Web series ===
Year	Title	Role	Ref.
2023	Moving	Han-byul	
