= Lee Jun-young =

South Korean singer and actor (born 1997)

- Lee in 2025
- Born: January 22, 1997 (age 29); Uijeongbu, South Korea
- Education: Pai Chai University
- Occupations: Singer; rapper; actor; hip-hop dancer; MC
- Agent: Billions
- Height: 185 cm (6 ft 1 in)
- Musical career
- Genre: K-pop
- Years active: 2014–present
- Labels: Billions; Blade; J-flex; NH Media
- Formerly of: U-KISS; UNB
- Website: thebillions.co.kr

Korean name
- Hangul: 이준영
- RR: I Junyeong
- MR: I Chunyŏng

Lee Jun-young (Korean: 이준영; born January 22, 1997), also known as Jun, is a South Korean singer, rapper and actor who debuted as a member of the boy band U-KISS in 2014. He joined the survival program The Unit (2017–18) and won to become the center and main vocalist of the project group UNB. As an actor, he has achieved wider recognition for his roles in several projects, such as Class of Lies (2019), D.P. (2021), Love and Leashes (2022), Mask Girl (2023), When Life Gives You Tangerines (2025), Weak Hero Class 2 (2025), Reborn Rookie (2026), and Four Hands, Two Sonatas (2026).

Lee has been noted for his strong acting skills paired with his diverse and unique role selections, earning him descriptions such as "the acting god" or "the most unconventional" among actors of his generation. Beyond his work in music and acting, he has participated in musical theatre, dance battles, variety programs, art exhibitions, and hosting activities, which has led some to describe him as a "hexagonal trendsetter" for his versatility across multiple fields.

== Career ==
=== 2014–2016: Career beginnings with U-KISS ===
On May 15, 2014, NH Media announced new member Jun to the public via U-KISS's official Korean website. On June 2, 2014, he made his debut with U-KISS and the group released its 9th mini album Mono Scandal along with the 19+ rated music video of the album's title track "Quit Playing". In the same year, U-KISS also released their 9th Japanese single album LOVE ON U and kicked off the U-KISS JAPAN LIVE TOUR 2014, which was held in Nippon Budokan, effectively starting his career in Japan. In December 2014, U-KISS made another comeback with their 10th Japanese single album Sweetie.

In 2015, U-KISS started the year with their 10th mini album Always, followed by their 4th Japanese regular album Action in March and 11th Japanese single album Stay Gold in September. In 2016, U-KISS made another comeback with their 12th Japanese single album Kissing to feel, 5th Japanese regular album One Shot One Kill, 11th mini album Stalker, and 13th Japanese single album PaNiC!. Unfortunately, Stalker was the last Korean comeback Jun had with U-KISS until his contract ended in 2021, since NH Media decided to focus on the Japanese market entirely.

=== 2017–2021: UNB and acting breakthrough ===
In 2017, Lee debuted as an actor in the tvN Wednesday-Thursday drama Avengers Social Club. It was based on the webtoon titled "Buam-dong Avengers Social Club" by Sajatokki, serialized on Daum. He played the role of Lee Soo-gyum, a third-year student at Saebit High School and the youngest member of the Bokja Club. Lee Soo-gyum was the illegitimate child of Lee Byung-soo (played by Choi Byung-mo) and he had a decisive role in leading Kim Jung-hye (played by Lee Yo-won) to form the Bokja Club. He was also the actual brain behind the Bokja Club, and he joined the club to take revenge on his father, who used him to secure the company's succession.

On October 28, 2017, Lee joined the KBS2 survival program The Unit. During the audition, he performed "Dang Dang Dang", a hip-hop rap song by Supreme Team, and received the first Super Boot evaluation on the show from the audience. He was ranked 6th in the first week, 3rd in the second week, and 2nd in the third week of the interim ranking result. However, on the first official ranking announcement, he took the 1st rank and was consistently holding the rank thereafter. In the final announcement, he was ranked 1st of the Top 9, debuting as the center. He also made it to 3rd place on the Non-Drama Performers Category list by Good Data Corporation during the show's final week. He then promoted with UNB, which consisted of finalists from the show, from April 7, 2018, to January 27, 2019.

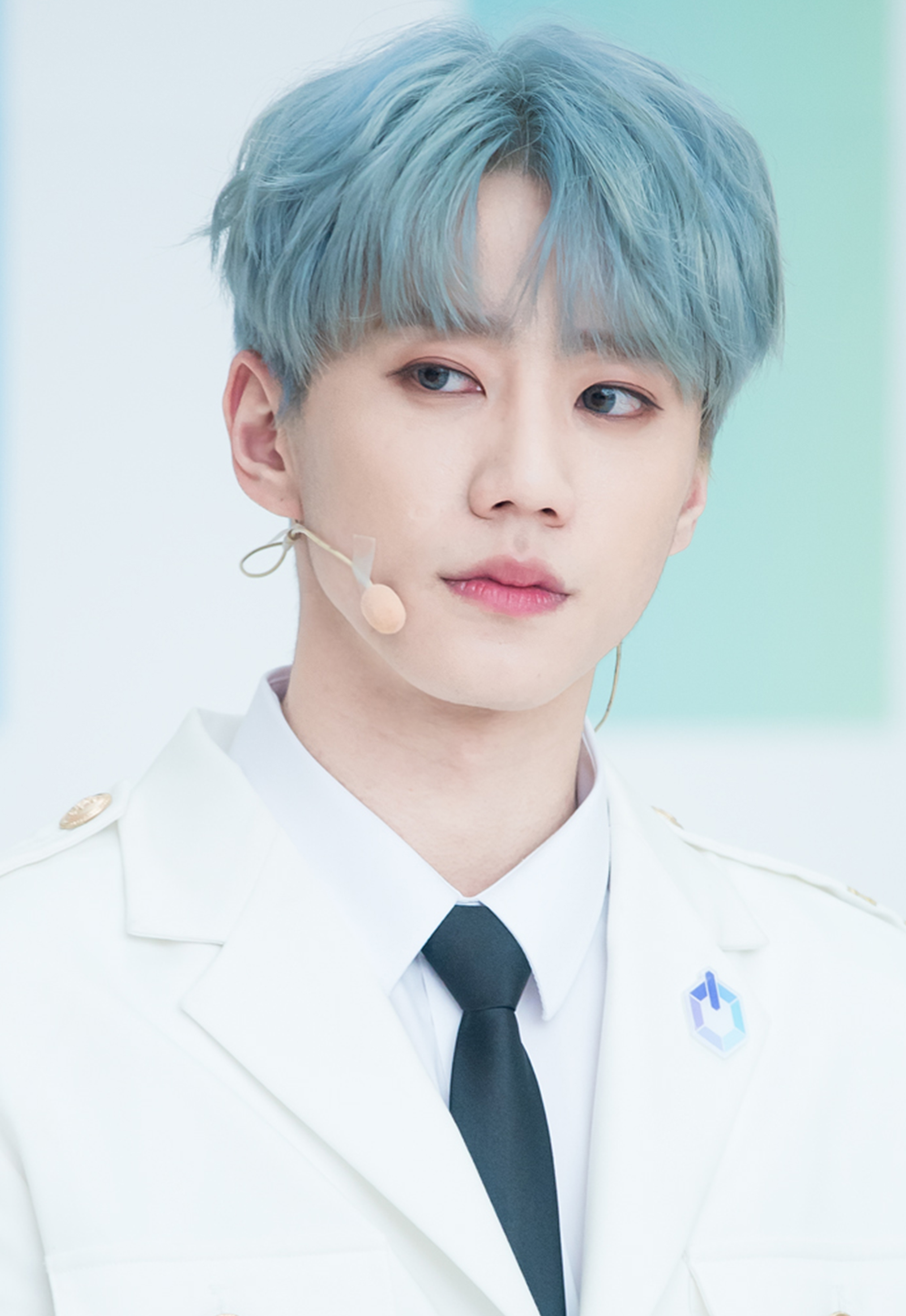
Lee in 2018

From April to May 2018, Lee appeared as "Compass" on MBC's TV program King of Mask Singer. In the first round, he performed a duet with Lee Sang-hoon of "It Was Like That Then". For the second round, he performed a solo cover version of "Eraser". In May 2018, he made his second acting appearance as Han Min-soo in the MBC television series Goodbye to Goodbye and received the Best New Actor award at the 2018 MBC Drama Awards. On April 10, 2019, Lee released his first Japanese solo single "Phenomenal World", which explored the futurepop genre. He performed his first solo showcase in Tokyo on February 4. Prior to the release, he also held a series of concerts on April 6 in Osaka and April 8 in Tokyo. Tower Records Japan ranked "Phenomenal World" as the #7 best-selling Japanese single by a Korean artist for the first half of 2019. He then starred in the OCN television series Class of Lies, which aired from July 17 to September 5. On November 6, he released both a Korean and Japanese version of his solo single "My Way", for which he wrote the lyrics. The single featured rapper Reddy and was produced by Sway D, accompanied by two music videos. After a digital download was released on October 30, the Japanese version ranked #2 on the dwango.jp K-POP Life Weekly Singles Chart. On November 28, he released his first Korean solo single "TELL" composed by himself as a pre-release for his album Gallery. On December 5, he made his solo debut in Korea with the title track "Curious About U" and the single album Gallery.

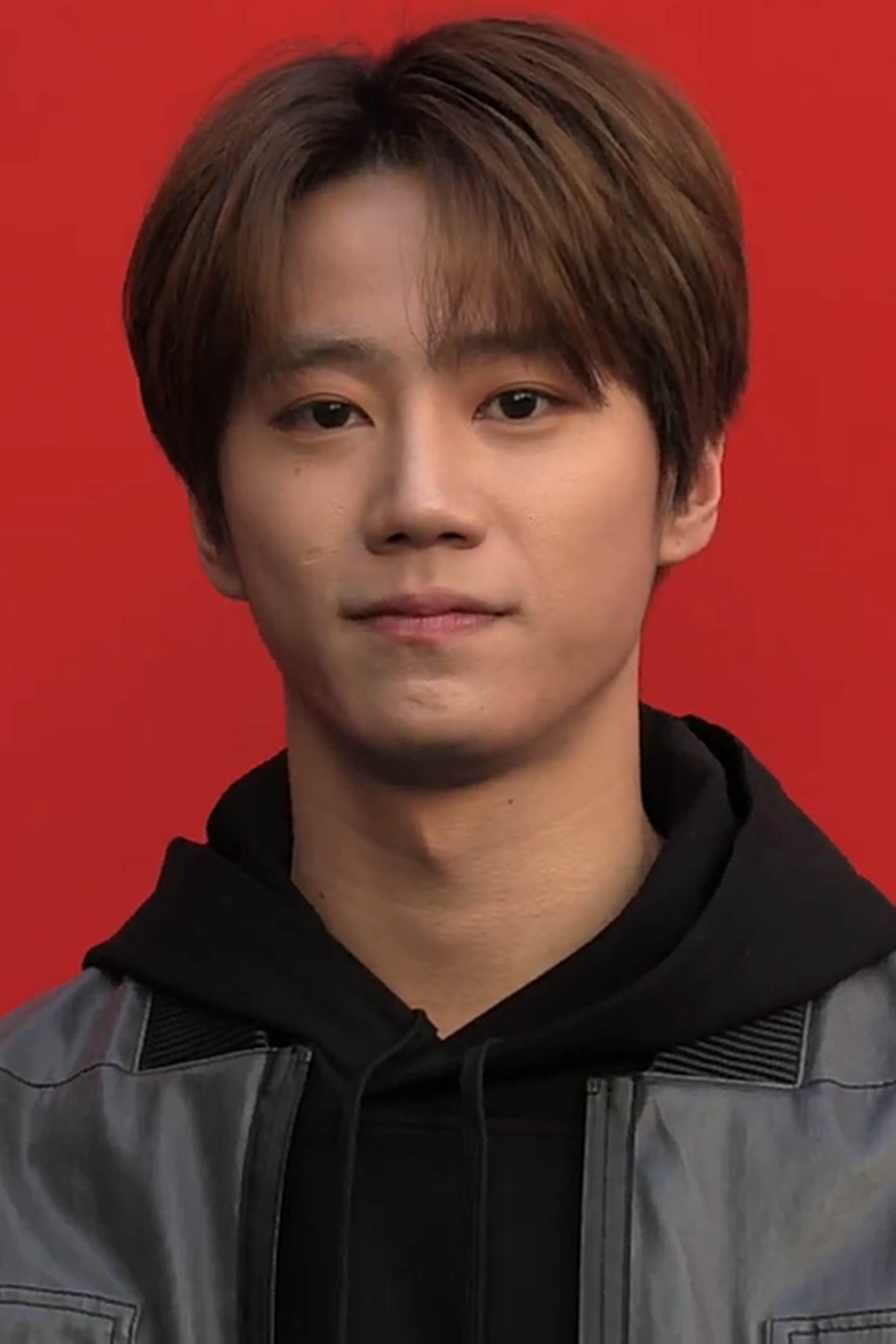
Lee in 2019

In 2020, Lee released his first solo Japanese mini album 22 on January 22, which is also his birthday. The album featured six songs, from ballads to rap and dance numbers.

Also in 2020, he acted in the musical Swag Age: Shout Out, Chosun! and received the Best New Actor award at the fifth Korea Musical Awards. In April 2020, he played Kang Woo-won in the SBS drama Good Casting, which was entirely pre-produced. In June 2020, he made a special appearance in the SBS drama Backstreet Rookie as a high school student who stole a college student's overcoat to buy cigarettes. In October 2020, he acted in the MBC Every 1 drama Please Don't Date Him. He participated in the soundtrack for the drama with the single "To You Who Will Be Tired". On October 7, he released the Korean single "Amen", which highlighted rap and hip-hop.

In May 2021, Lee starred in the KBS2 drama Imitation as Kwon Ryok, an idol-actor and center of fictional idol group SHAX. As a SHAX member, he participated in the songs "MALO", "AMEN", and "Your Sign (SHAX ver)". In the first two mentioned songs, he mainly took over the rap. As Kwon Ryok, he participated in the song "Your Sign" with the cast and "My Old Story" sung in duet with Jiyeon of T-ara. All the songs are available on various music streaming services.

After departing NH Media in August, Lee announced in November that he co-founded a new company, J-flex, which will serve as his current agency for his acting projects. In August 2021, he appeared in the third episode of the Netflix series D.P. as deserter Jung Hyun-min. In order to digest the intense action scenes, he learned boxing with actor Jung Hae-in, who played Ahn Jun-ho in the series, for a few months at an action school before filming. As the action scenes were shot without a stunt double, he received praise for his swift and accurate movements. In November 2021, he starred in the SBS drama Let Me Be Your Knight as Yoon Tae-in, a songwriter and vocalist of fictional band LUNA. As a member of LUNA, he sang several songs: "Beautiful Breakup", "Midnight Fantasy", "Let Me Be Your Knight", "Love Paranoia", and "Rock & Roll Tonight". He also sang a song titled "Love One Day" by himself.

=== 2022–2024: Rising popularity ===
In February 2022, Lee starred in the Netflix movie Love and Leashes, an adaptation of the webtoon titled "Moral Sense" on the topic of BDSM. He starred alongside Seohyun (Jung Ji-woo) as Jung Ji-hoo, a newly transferred assistant manager from the business team. Outwardly, he is a nice and popular superior, but inwardly, he hides secret desires. In October 2022, he starred in the MBC drama May I Help You alongside Hyeri. The drama was filmed from June 1, 2022 to December 9, 2022. He played the role Kim Tae-hee, who referred to himself as the 100-won butler that can do any kind of errand as long as you paid him. He also sang an OST titled "A Fine Day" for this drama.

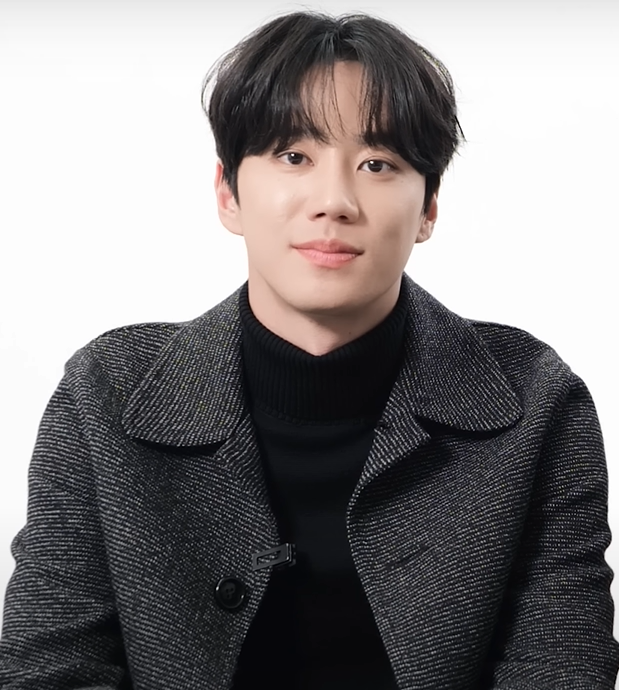
Lee in 2022

In 2023, Lee starred in the movie Brave Citizen, based on the webtoon of the same name. He starred alongside Shin Hye-sun (So Si-min) as Han Su-gang, a high school bully that's described as a vicious villain that has never been seen before. The filming period was from December 30, 2021 to April 5, 2022 and the movie became available in theaters starting from October 25, 2023. In August 2023, he appeared as the villain in the fourth episode of the Netflix series Mask Girl. His acting in Brave Citizen and Mask Girl earned him the Best Acting Performance Award at the 2023 Asia Artist Awards.

In January 2024, Lee starred in the Netflix movie Badland Hunters alongside Ma Dong-seok, Lee Hee-joon, and Roh Jeong-eui. In February 2024, he starred in the Disney+ series The Impossible Heir alongside Lee Jae-wook. In May 2024, he starred in the TVING series Dreaming of a Freaking Fairytale alongside Pyo Ye-jin.

=== 2025–present: Breakthrough to mainstream, music comeback, and further success ===
In February 2025, Lee made a cameo appearance in the tvN and TVING historical drama The Queen Who Crowns. He was praised for his portrayal of King Sejong in his first historical drama role. In the same month, he starred in the Netflix series Melo Movie as Hong Si-jun, an aspiring musician who met Son Ju-a (Jeon So-nee) again, his ex-girlfriend of seven years. He showcased his singing skills by performing the OST titled "Under Sunset" entirely in English.

In March 2025, Lee starred in a supporting role as Park Yeong-bum, the first love of IU's character Yang Geum-myeong, in the Netflix series When Life Gives You Tangerines. He was recognized in the buzzworthy Drama Performer Category by Good Data Corporation, ranking 4th in the third week of March and 8th in the fourth week. He also appeared in the Netflix series Weak Hero Class 2 as antagonist character Geum Seong-je, which aired on April 25. At the 2025 Fundex Awards, he received a double nomination in the Best Supporting Male Performer on OTT Category for his roles in the two aforementioned works, and eventually won for his role in Weak Hero Class 2. Due to his frequent appearances in OTT series, he is sometimes referred to as "OTT Prince", "OTT Son", or "OTT Civil Servant".

Lee then starred in the KBS2 drama Pump Up the Healthy Love alongside Jung Eun-ji as Do Hyeon-jeong, a gym manager who transformed his life through exercise despite being born smaller than the size of a 1.5-kilogram dumbbell. For this role, he won the Excellence Award, Actor in a Miniseries at the 2025 KBS Drama Awards. He also won the Popularity Award and Best Couple Award (with Jung Eun-ji) along with receiving a nomination for the Top Excellence Award for an Actor.

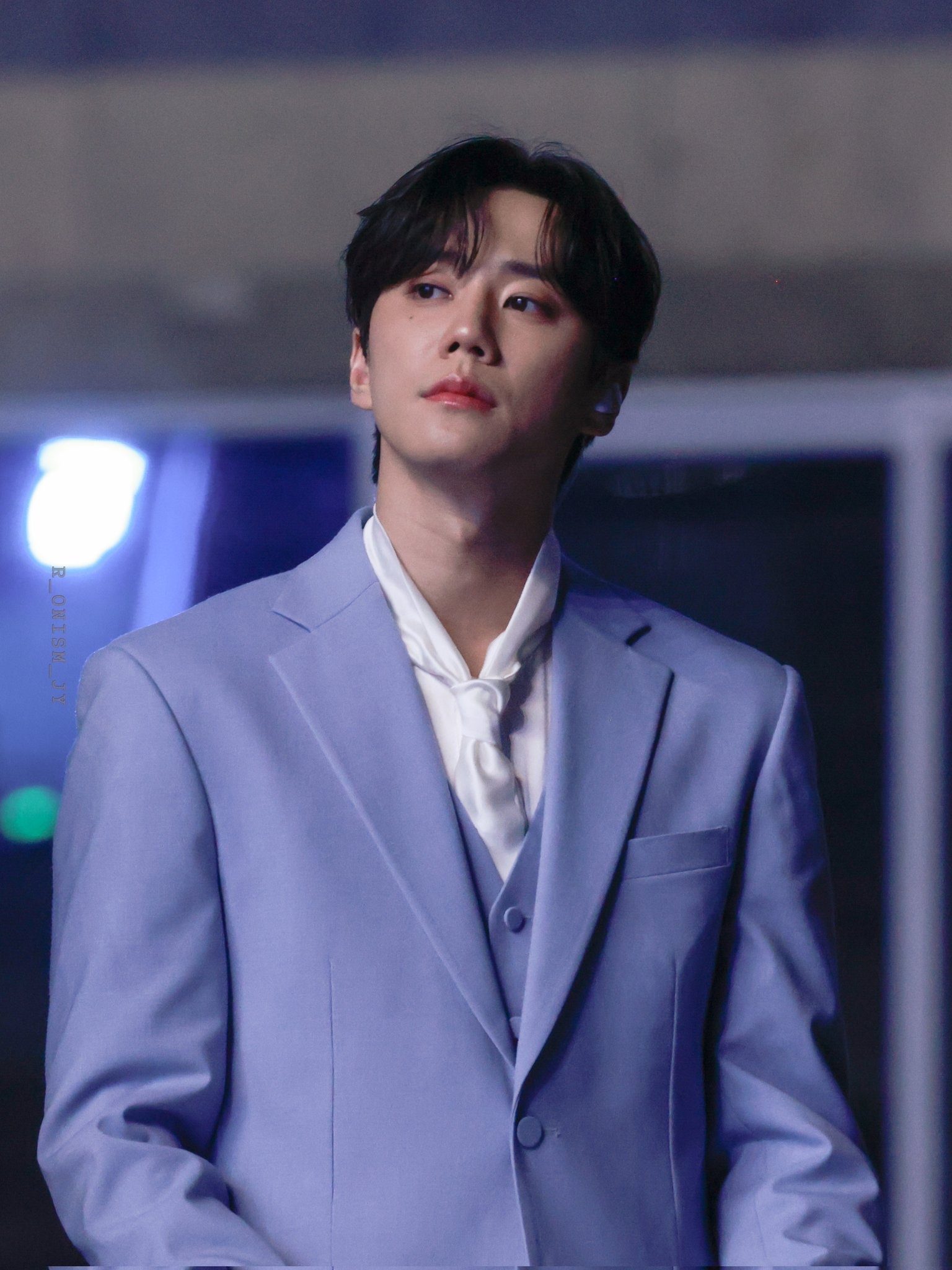
Lee in 2025

On September 22, Lee made a comeback as a singer with his first mini album Last Dance. The album contained two title tracks, the hip-hop track "Bounce" and the ballad "Why Are You Doing This to Me". He also participated in writing and composing the track "Mr. Clean". Since the album consisted of various genres such as dance, ballad, and hip-hop, critics have referred to him as an all-rounder.

From August to October 2025, Lee appeared in the MBC TV variety show Hangout with Yoo for its '80s Seoul Music Festival project. He appeared in the episodes that built up towards the festival's climax, with key episodes including the song selection and performance broadcasts. During the festival, Lee delivered a live rendition of the classic song "I MISS YOU". He drew widespread attention from audiences and fellow cast members alike, while viewers praised his energetic vocals and stage presence. He secured both the Grand Prize (judged by industry seniors) and the Popularity Award (voted by netizens) on the show. In recognition of winning the Popularity Award, an official music video for the song "I MISS YOU" was released following the broadcast. He also rose to 4th place on the Non-Drama Performers Category list by Good Data Corporation, reflecting the strong public response to his performance and overall presence in the project.

In May 2026, Lee took on a double role as the titular character in the JTBC drama Reborn Rookie. For his performance, where he portrayed a soul swap between 27-year-old soccer player Hwang Jun-hyeon and 72-year-old conglomerate chairman Kang Yong-ho, he received praise from critics and audiences for his acting skills and synchronization with his co-stars. The series finale went on to record 13.6% in nationwide viewership ratings, becoming one of the highest-rated dramas in Korean cable television history and with Lee's performance credited as the driving force behind its commercial success. Later in 2026, Lee starred alongside Song Kang in the hit tvN drama Four Hands, Two Sonatas where he played a musical genius in piano and conduction. For his work in the series, Lee ranked first on both the buzzworthy All Performer and Drama Performer Category lists by Good Data Corporation. He maintained his first place ranking for the entire duration of the series, totaling six consecutive weeks, and became the first and only actor in 2026 to achieve the milestone.

== Other ventures ==
=== Endorsements and fashion ===
In 2022, Lee collaborated with RDVZ, a popular Korean streetwear brand founded and owned by fellow U-KISS member Kiseop. Lee participated in co-designing merchandise for the brand's "Perfectly Imperfect" summer collection, which later dropped in May 2022 across online Korean stores.

In September 2025, Lee became the ambassador for PLAC, a contemporary Korean fashion and denim brand, and he represented the brand's 2025 fall/winter fashion season. Later in September 2025, Lee attended New York Fashion Week on behalf of Swedish fashion brand COS for their fall/winter 2025 collection.

In November 2025, Lee was selected as the exclusive model for the Korean dining franchise Shabule Garden, with a brand representative citing his "youthful" and "stylish" image as a quality that aligns with the company's values. Within the same month, Lee partnered with Japanese skincare brand Shiseido to campaign for their UNO line, specializing in men's skincare products. Lee then participated in voice-over work alongside actress Jung Chae-yeon for Lotte Chilsung's Saero commercial, an animated video highlighting the popular soju product released through YouTube on November 20, 2025.

== Personal life ==
=== Martial arts ===
Lee holds a second-degree black belt in Taekwondo, a third-degree black belt in special forces martial arts (Teukgongmoosol), and a third-degree black belt in Hapkido. He has been training in MMA (mixed martial arts) since 2021 after he felt his action scenes for D.P. were inadequate. He also started learning boxing at the gym run by Ma Dong-seok after they acted together in Badland Hunters.

=== Agency ===
After his contract ended with NH Media in June 2021, Lee jointly founded J-flex Entertainment with his former manager, Shim Hwa-seok, in November of the same year. In June 2023, the company was acquired by Blade Entertainment. After several small scale mergers, the company changed its name to Billions in June 2024.

=== Model citizen ===
On August 25, 2021, Lee helped the police arrest a drunk driver. He was driving to his home in Uijeongbu when he noticed the car ahead of him swerving dangerously. He honked twice to alert the driver, thinking they might have been sleep-deprived, but to no avail. He decided to call the police on the suspicion of drunk driving. The police asked for his help in following the suspect. He gave consent for the police to track his phone's location and then chased the suspect for more than an hour. After the chase was done, he cooperated with the investigation by turning over his car's black box to the police. The incident made headlines three days later on August 28. Since Lee had no agency or manager at the time, the statement came from his former agency, NH Media. He was to be awarded the Model Citizen Award, but turned it down since "it didn't feel right", citing that he did not do it "out of a sense of duty".

=== Military service ===
On June 14, 2026, Lee announced through his Instagram that he would begin his mandatory military service on July 21. He enlisted as an active duty soldier in the army with only close friends and family present at his entrance ceremony. On August 26, 2026, he completed his five-week training at the Republic of Korea's 35th Infantry Division Recruit Training Battalion in Jeonbuk State, ranked as the company commander of his squad.

== Discography ==
=== Extended plays ===
Title	EP details	Peak chart positions		Sales
Title	EP details	KOR	JPN	Sales
22	Released: January 22, 2020; Label: Avex Trax; Formats: CD, digital download; Track listing: 1. "Come Alive"; 2. "Be Your Man"; 3. "I'm in Love with You"; 4. "Gravity"; 5. "My Way" (featuring Reddy); 6. "Circle of Love"	—	18	JPN: 3,649 (Phy.)
Last Dance	Released: September 22, 2025; Label: Billions; Formats: CD, digital download; Track listing: 1. "Bounce"; 2. "Insomnia"; 3. "Mr. Clean" (featuring Reddy); 4. "Why Are You Doing This to Me"; 5. "Bounce" (instrumental); 6. "Why Are You Doing This to Me" (instrumental)	7	—	KOR: 24,885

=== Single albums ===
Title	Details	Peak chart positions		Sales
Title	Details	KOR	JPN	Sales
Phenomenal World	Released: April 10, 2019; Label: Avex Trax; Formats: CD, digital download; Track listing: 1. "Phenomenal World"; 2. "Never too late" 3. "Phenomenal World (Inst.)"; 4. "Never too late (Inst.)"	—	12	JPN: 10,124
Gallery	Released: December 5, 2019; Label: NH Media; Formats: CD, digital download; Track listing: 1. "Curious About U" (궁금해); 2. "Mirror"; 3. "Tell"	36	—	KOR: 2,404

=== Singles ===
==== As lead artist ====
Title	Year	Peak chart positions			Sales	Album
Title	Year	KOR	JPN	KOR Down.	Sales	Album
Korean
"Tell"	2019	—	—	—	Undisclosed	Gallery
"Curious About U" (궁금해)	2019	—	—	—	Undisclosed	Gallery
"Amen"	2020	—	—	—	Undisclosed	Non-album single
"Bounce"	2025	—	—	54	Undisclosed	Last Dance
Japanese
"Phenomenal World"	2019	—	12	—	JPN: 10,124	Phenomenal World
"Happiness" (Note: Happiness was released as a digital single only on June 12.)	2019	—	—	—	—N/a	Non-album single
"My Way" (feat. Reddy)	2019	—	—	—	—N/a	22
"—" denotes releases that did not chart or were not released in that region.

==== As featured artist ====
Title	Year	Album
"Love Me" (Lee Hae-ri featuring Jun)	2017	Non-album singles
"Abstract" (Solidemo featuring Jun)	2017	Non-album singles
"Winter Wonderland" (Kyrielle Lee Gyu-in, Choi Byung-mo featuring Jun)	2017	Non-album singles

=== Collaborations ===
Title	Year	Album
"Don't Know Why" (with Shion Miyawaki and AK)	2018	Non-album single

=== Digital releases ===
Title	Year	Album
"Ziugae" (지우개)	2018	King of Mask Singer Episode 152
"Because It's You" (너라서)	2018	Goodbye to Goodbye OST
"My Love To You" (내사랑 투유) (with Kei)	2019	Chart Show Again - The Winner Is?
"Let's Make Love" (사랑하자) (with Soyeon (Laboum))	2020	Good Casting OST
"To You Who Will Be Tired" (지쳐있을 너에게)	2020	Please Don't Date Him OST
"My Old Story" (나의 옛날 이야기) (with Park Ji-yeon (T-ARA))	2021	Imitation OST - Various Artist
"Love One Day"	2022	Let Me Be Your Knight OST - Various Artist
"A Fine Day" (다시 오늘)	2022	May I Help You? OST
"Under Sunset"	2025	Melo Movie OST
"If it was me (Piano by Park Bo-gum)"	2025	The Seasons: Cantabile of Park Bo Gum
"That's My Own World" (그것만이 내 세상)	2025	'80s MBC Seoul GAYOJE Preliminary Round
"I MISS YOU" (널 그리며)	2025	'80s MBC Seoul GAYOJE Final Round Side B

=== Self-composition ===
Title	Year	Lyrics	Composition	Album
"TELL"	2019	Lee Jun-young, Unkwn code	Lee Jun-young, Unkwn code	Gallery
"MIRROR"	2019	Lee Jun-young	Lee Jun-young, Unkwn code	Gallery
"Gravity"	2020	Lee Jun-young	Lee Jun-young, Unkwn code	22
"Amen"	2020	Lee Jun-young	Lee Jun-young, Unkwn code	Non-album single
"Mr. Clean"	2025	Lee Jun-young, REDDY	Lee Jun-young, REDDY, Kit	Last Dance

=== Group OST ===
Title	Artist	Year	Album
"MALO"	SHAX (샥스) (Note: SHAX is fictional boy group for the drama Imitation with the members being Lee Jun-young, Kang Chan-hee, Ahn Jeong-hun, Yuri Park, Hwiyoung, and Choi Jong-ho.)	2021	Imitation OST
"AMEN"	SHAX (샥스)	2021	Imitation OST
"Your Sign (SHAX Ver.)" (별자리 (SHAX Ver.))	SHAX (샥스)	2021	Imitation OST
"Your Sign" (별자리)	SHAX (샥스), 티파티 (Tea Party), Sparkling (스파클링), LA LIMA (라리마)	2021	Imitation OST
"Beautiful Breakup"	LUNA (루나) (Note: LUNA is fictional boy group for the drama Let Me Be Your Knight with the members being Lee Jun-young, Jang Dong-joo, Kim Jong-hyun, Yoon Ji-sung, and Kim Dong-hyun.)	2021	Let Me Be Your Knight OST
"Love Paranoia"	LUNA (루나)	2021	Let Me Be Your Knight OST
"Let Me Be Your Knight" (너의 밤이 되어줄게)	LUNA (루나)	2021	Let Me Be Your Knight OST
"Rock & Roll Tonight"	LUNA (루나)	2022	Let Me Be Your Knight OST
"Midnight Fantasy"	LUNA (루나)	2022	Let Me Be Your Knight OST

== Filmography ==
=== Film ===
Key
†	Denotes films that have not yet been released

Year	Title	Role	Notes	Ref.
2016	More Painful than Sadness	Lee Yun-ho	Independent film [Unreleased]	
2022	Love and Leashes	Jung Ji-hoo	Netflix film	
2023	Brave Citizen	Han Soo-gang		
2024	Badland Hunters	Choi Ji-wan	Netflix film	
2025	Tokyo Taxi	Kim Young-ki	Japanese film	
2026	Sinner †	Eun-su		

=== Television series ===
Key
†	Denotes television productions that have not yet been released

Year	Title	Role	Notes	Ref.
2017	Avengers Social Club	Lee Soo-gyum		
2018	Goodbye to Goodbye	Han Min-soo		
2019	Class of Lies	Yoo Beom-jin		
2020	Good Casting	Kang Woo-won		
2020	Backstreet Rookie	High school student	Cameo (Ep.2)	
2020–2021	Please Don't Date Him	Jung Kook-hee		
2021	Imitation	Kwon Ryok		
2021–2023	D.P.	Jung Hyun-min	Cameo (Season 1 Ep.3, Season 2 Ep.1)	
2021–2022	Let Me Be Your Knight	Yoon Tae-in		
2022	May I Help You?	Butler Kim / Kim Tae-hee		
2023	Mask Girl	Choi Bu-yong	Cameo (Ep.4)	
2024	The Impossible Heir	Kang In-ha		
2024	Dreaming of a Freaking Fairy Tale	Moon Cha-min		
2025	The Queen Who Crowns	King Sejong	Cameo (Ep.12)	
2025	Melo Movie	Hong Si-jun		
2025	When Life Gives You Tangerines	Park Yeong-bum		
2025	Weak Hero Class 2	Geum Seong-je		
2025	Pump Up the Healthy Love	Do Hyeon-jeong		
2026	Reborn Rookie	Hwang Jun-hyeon / Kang Yong-ho		
2026	Our Sticky Love	Kaito	Cameo (Ep.8-9, 12)	
2026	Four Hands, Two Sonatas	Choi Jeong-yo		

=== Television shows ===
Year	Title	Role	Notes	Ref.
2016	2016 Idol Star Athletics Rhythmic Gymnastics Futsal Archery Championships	Contestant	Bronze medalist – 60m athletics event	
2017	The Unit: Idol Rebooting Project	Contestant	1st-place winner	
2018	Immortal Songs: Singing the Legend	Contestant	Ep.345	
2018	King of Mask Singer	Contestant	as 'Compass' (Ep.151–152) – lost in 2nd round	
2022	King of Mask Singer	Contestant	as '25 21' (Ep.355–356) – lost in 3rd round	
2026	Trails to Hakka	Cast member	with Kim Ha-neul, Nam Woo-hyun, Rio Peng, and Baik Dusan	

=== Web shows ===
Year	Title	Role	Notes	Ref.
2018	UNB in Japan: OND	Himself		
2019	U-KISS Tasty U (U-KISSのマシッソU)	Himself		
2020	U-KISS Soohyun & Jun "Anything Challenge"	Himself		

=== Music video appearances ===
Year	Song	Artist	Notes	Ref.
2018	"There Has Never Been a Day I Haven't Loved You" (하루도 그대를 사랑하지 않은 적이 없었다)	Im Chang-jung	with Lee Ye-hyun	
2018	"Turn It On" (불을 켜)	Laboum		
2025	"Rainbow Light"	Lim Seul-ong (2AM)		

=== Hosting ===
Year	Title	Notes	Venue	Date	Ref.
2025	MBC University Song Festival	with Jang Do-yeon and Kim Min-ju	Korea Maritime and Ocean University	October 3	
2025	10th Anniversary AAA Festa (ACON 2025)	with I-dle's Shuhua, Cravity's Allen and KiiiKiii's Sui	Kaohsiung National Stadium	December 7	
2025	Music Bank Global Festival in Japan	with Ive's Jang Won-young	Tokyo National Stadium	December 13–14	

== Musical and performances ==
=== Musical play ===
Year performed, play title (English & original), role name, venue, and performance date
Year	Title		Role	Venue	Date	Ref.
Year	English	Original	Role	Venue	Date	Ref.
2015	ON AIR ~ Night Flight ~	ON AIR ～夜間飛行～ (Note: Korea-Japan joint musical)	Ta-yin	Zepp Blue Theater Roppongi	February 5–12	
2015	RUN TO YOU～Street Life～	—N/a	Kang Jae-min	Zepp Blue Theater Roppongi	June 26–July 5	
2019	Swag Age: Shout out, Chosun!	스웨그에이지: 외쳐, 조선!	Hong Dan	Doosan Art Center Yeonggang Hall	June 18–August 25	
2020	Swag Age: Shout out, Chosun!	스웨그에이지: 외쳐, 조선!	Hong Dan	Hongik University Daehakro Art Center Grand Theater	February 14–May 24 (Note: The previous closing date was April 26. According to the government policy recommending social distancing due to the COVID-19 pandemic, the performance was suspended for two weeks from March 31, and the closing date was extended to May 24.)	

=== Concert performances ===
Year the event was held, event title (English & original), performance list, venue, and performance date
Year	Title		Performance	Venue	Date	Ref.
Year	English	Original	Performance	Venue	Date	Ref.
2021	FEBC Fall Concert	FEBC 가을음악회	Performance list: 1. "Beautiful World (아름다운세상)"; 2. "Because It's You"; 3. "The Lord's Love (좋은 찬양)"	Lotte Concert Hall	November 9	
2023	AAA's Beginning Concert 'Male God'	AAA'의 비기닝 콘서트 '男神(남신)'	Performance list: 1. "Come Alive"; 2. "Curtain Call"; 3. "Phenomenal World + Dance Break"	Yokohama Pia Arena MM	July 8	
2025	The 80s MBC Seoul Song Festival	놀면 뭐하니? '80s MBC 서울가요제	Performance list: 1. "I MISS YOU" (널 그리며)	MBC Ilsan Dream Center	September 11	
2025	10th Asia Artist Awards	'10주년 아시아 아티스트 어워즈 2025	Performance list: 1. "BOUNCE MIX.ver+BACK"	Kaohsiung National Stadium	December 6	
2025	10th Anniversary AAA Festa (ACON 2025)	'10주년 아시아 아티스트 어워즈 2025 페스타 'ACON 2025'	Performance list: 1. "Insomnia"	Kaohsiung National Stadium	December 7	
2025	Music Bank Global Festival in Japan	2025 뮤직뱅크 글로벌페스티벌 IN JAPAN	Performance list: 1. "BOUNCE"	Tokyo National Stadium	December 13–14	

== Accolades ==
=== Awards and nominations ===
Name of the award ceremony, year presented, category, nominee of the award, and the result of the nomination
Award ceremony	Year	Category	Nominee / Work	Result	Ref.
The 80s MBC Seoul Song Festival	2025	Grand Prize (Daesang) (Note: A Daesang (Korean: 대상), which translates to "Grand Prize", is the highest honor given out at South Korean award ceremonies.)	Lee Jun-young	Won	
The 80s MBC Seoul Song Festival	2025	Popularity Award	Lee Jun-young	Won	
APAN Star Awards	2025	Excellence Award, Actor in a Miniseries	When Life Gives You Tangerines, Pump Up the Healthy Love	Won	
APAN Star Awards	2025	Best Entertainer Award	Lee Jun-young	Nominated	
Asia Artist Awards	2021	Best Choice Award – Actor	Lee Jun-young	Won	
Asia Artist Awards	2022	Best Actor Award	May I Help You?	Won	
Asia Artist Awards	2023	Best Acting Performance Award	Brave Citizen, Mask Girl	Won	
Asia Artist Awards	2025	Best Actor – Male	Lee Jun-young	Won	
Blue Dragon Series Awards	2025	Best Supporting Actor	Weak Hero Class 2	Nominated	
Brand of the Year Awards	2025	Male Actor (Rising Star) Category	Lee Jun-young	Won	
DAP Awards	2025	Melo Romance Pass Award	When Life Gives You Tangerines, Melo Movie, Weak Hero Class 2, Pump Up the Healthy Love	Won	
Director's Cut Awards	2024	Best New Actor in a Series	Mask Girl	Nominated	
Fundex Awards	2025	Best Supporting Actor of OTT Original Drama	Weak Hero Class 2	Won	
Fundex Awards	2025	Best Supporting Actor of OTT Original Drama	When Life Gives You Tangerines	Nominated	
Fundex Awards	2026	Best Actor of TV Drama	Four Hands, Two Sonatas	Pending	
KBS Drama Awards	2025	Best Couple Award	Lee Jun-young (with Jung Eun-ji); Pump Up the Healthy Love	Won	
KBS Drama Awards	2025	Excellence Award, Actor in a Miniseries	Pump Up the Healthy Love	Won	
KBS Drama Awards	2025	Popularity Award	Pump Up the Healthy Love	Won	
KBS Drama Awards	2025	Top Excellence Award, Actor	Pump Up the Healthy Love	Nominated	
Korea Cultural Entertainment Awards	2018	Best New Actor	Goodbye to Goodbye	Won	
Korea Drama Awards	2025	Excellence Award, Actor	When Life Gives You Tangerines, Melo Movie, Weak Hero Class 2, Pump Up the Healthy Love	Nominated	
Korea First Brand Awards	2020	Acting Idol Award	Lee Jun-young	Nominated	
Korea First Brand Awards	2020	Arttainer (Art Entertainer) Award	Lee Jun-young	Nominated	
Korea Musical Awards	2021	Best New Actor	Swag Age: Shout out, Chosun!	Won	
MBC Drama Awards	2018	Best New Actor	Goodbye to Goodbye	Won	
MBC Drama Awards	2022	Best Couple Award	Lee Jun-young (with Lee Hye-ri); May I Help You?	Nominated	
MBC Drama Awards	2022	Excellence Award, Actor in a Miniseries	May I Help You?	Nominated	
MBC Entertainment Awards	2025	Rookie Award	Hangout with Yoo	Nominated	
OCN Awards	2019	The Capability Award	Class of Lies	Nominated	
SBS Drama Awards	2020	Best New Actor	Good Casting	Nominated	
SBS Drama Awards	2021	Excellence Award, Actor in a Miniseries Romance/Comedy Drama	Let Me Be Your Knight	Nominated	
Scene Stealer Festival	2023	Bonsang (Main Prize)	Love and Leashes, May I Help You?	Won	

=== Listicles ===
Name of publisher, year listed, name of listicle, and placement
Publisher	Year	Listicle	Placement	Ref.
Cine21	2021	New Actors that will lead Korean Video Content Industry in 2022	5th (Note: mentioned together with Kim Seon-ho, Wi Ha-joon, Song Kang, Rowoon, and Byeon Woo-seok)	
Gallup Korea	2024	Most Anticipated Next Generation Actor	Included	
Joy News 24	2025	Entertainment Power People	Included	
Joy News 24	2026	Entertainment Power People	Included	
Joy News 24	2026	Best Movie Actor	Included	
Joy News 24	2026	Best Drama Actor	2nd	
Joy News 24	2026	Best Couple	4th (Note: mentioned together with Song Kang for Four Hands, Two Sonatas)	
Joy News 24	2026	Best Drama Rising Star	6th	
Sisa Journal (Note: The Sisa Journal is one of the major weekly news magazines in Korea. Established in 1989, its annually conducted 'Who Moves Korea' survey determines the most influential figures in the country and highlights next-generation leaders of Korea. The survey is conducted with Gallup Korea and compiles the picks from 500 experts across 10 fields, including professors, journalists, politicians, businessmen, and cultural artists, as well as the picks from 500 civilians, totaling to 1000.)	2026	Next Generation Leaders	Included (Note: Only two to three actors are included every year; mentioned together with Park Ji-hoon)	
Star News	2023	Best Idol-Actor of the Year (Male)	6th (Note: mentioned together with NU'EST Hwang Min-hyun and 2PM Ok Taecyeon)	
