= Studio N (company) =

South Korean television studio

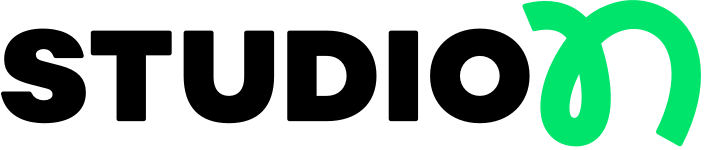
- Type: Subsidiary
- Industry: Film
- Founded: August 1, 2018; 8 years ago in South Korea
- Key people: Kwon Mi-kyung (CEO)
- Owner: Webtoon
- Parent: Naver Corporation
- Website: www.studioncorp.com/en/

Studio N (Korean: 스튜디오 N) is a subsidiary of Webtoon Entertainment Inc. launched in August 2018 that produces drama films and television series based on stories from their Korean library of webtoons and web novels. The subsidiary is headed by Kwon Mi-kyung, who was a former head of the film business division of CJ ENM. Kwon describes the studio as a "IP bridge company that collaborates with existing film and drama production companies".

Dramas include Hell Is Other People, broadcast on OCN; and Pegasus Market, broadcast on tvN.

== Works ==
=== TV series ===
| Title | Webtoon author | Premiere | Seasons | Network | Notes | Ref. |
|---|---|---|---|---|---|---|
| Hell Is Other People (also Strangers from Hell) | Kim Yong-ki | August 31, 2019 | 1 season, 10 episodes | OCN | Co-produced with Woo Sang Film | |
| Pegasus Market | Kim Gyu-sam | September 20, 2019 | 1 season, 12 episodes | tvN | Co-produced with CJ ENM | |
| True Beauty | Yaongyi | December 9, 2020 | 1 season, 16 episodes | tvN | Co-produced with Studio Dragon and Bon Factory Worldwide | |
| Sweet Home | Kim Carnby, Hwang Young-chan | December 18, 2020 | 2 season, 18 episodes | Netflix | Co-produced with Studio Dragon | |
| Nevertheless, | Jung Seo | June 19, 2021 | 1 season, 16 episodes | JTBC | Co-produced with JTBC Studios and Beyond J | |
| Yumi's Cells | Lee Dong-gun | September 17, 2021 | 2 season, 28 episodes | tvN; TVING | Co-produced with Studio Dragon, Merrycow Creative and TVING Corporation | |
| Our Beloved Summer | N/A (Note: Studio N's first original. The webtoon is prequel to the series and published one month before the series premiere, tells about main leads in high school days.) | December 6, 2021 | 1 season, 16 episodes | SBS TV | Co-produced with Studio S, Super Moon Pictures and Big Ocean ENM | |
| A DeadbEAT's Meal | Cheese | December 10, 2021 | 1 season, 12 episodes | TVING; NaverTV; YouTube | Co-produced with Playlist Studio | |
| Tomorrow | Llama | April 1, 2022 | 1 season, 16 episodes | MBC TV | Co-produced with Super Moon Pictures and Big Ocean ENM | |
| Today's Webtoon | N/A (Note: A local drama adaptation of the Japanese manga Jūhan Shuttai! by Naoko Matsuda.) | July 29, 2022 | 1 season, 16 episodes | SBS TV | Co-produced with Studio S | |
| The Golden Spoon | HD3 | September 23, 2022 | 1 season, 16 episodes | MBC TV | Co-produced with Samhwa Networks | |
| Unlock My Boss | Park Seong-hyun | December 7, 2022 | 1 season, 12 episodes | ENA | Co-produced with High Zium Studio | |
| Bloodhounds | Jeong Chan | June 9, 2023 | 1 season, 8 episodes | Netflix | Co-produced with Seed Film and Seven Osix | |
| See You in My 19th Life | Lee Hey | June 17, 2023 | 1 season, 12 episodes | tvN | Co-produced with Studio Finecut | |
| A Bloody Lucky Day | Aporia | October 4, 2023 | 1 season, 10 episodes | TVING | Co-produced with The Great Show and Studio Dragon | |
| Doona! | Min Song-a | October 20, 2023 | 1 season, 9 episodes | Netflix | Co-produced with Showrunners and Studio Dragon | |
| Vigilante | CRG, Kim Gyu-sam | November 8, 2023 | 1 season, 8 episodes | Disney+ | TV serial and film adaptation | |
| Death's Game | Lee Won-sik | December 15, 2023 | 1 season, 8 episodes | TVING | Co-produce with SLL and People Entertainment | |
| Chicken Nugget | Park Ji-dok | March 15, 2024 | 1 season, 10 episodes | Netflix | Co-produced with Plus Media Entertainment | |
| The 8 Show | Bae Jin-soo | May 17, 2024 | 1 season, 8 episodes | Netflix | Co-produced with Magnum Nine and Lotte Cultureworks | |
| Jeongnyeon: The Star Is Born | Seo Ireh, Namon | October 12, 2024 | 1 season, 12 episodes | tvN | Co-produced with Management MMM and NPIO Entertainment | |
| Nevertheless - The shapes of love | Jung Seo | December 9, 2024 | 1 season, 8 episodes | Netflix, Abema | Co-produced with Studio SLL, Japan's Babel Label | |
| The Trauma Code: Heroes on Call | Hansanleega | January 24, 2025 | 1 season, 8 episodes | Netflix | Co-produced with Mays Entertainment | |
| Melo Movie | —N/a | February 14, 2025 | 1 season, 10 episodes | Netflix | —N/a | |
| My Dearest Nemesis | Yang Hye-jin | February 25, 2025 | 1 season, 12 episodes | tvN; TVING | Co-produced with Studio Dragon | |
| Mercy for None | Oh Se-hyung, Kim Geun-tae | June 6, 2025 | 1 season, 7 episodes | Netflix | Co-produced by Yong Film | |
| The First Night with the Duke | MSG, Teava | June 11, 2025 | 1 season, 12 episodes | KBS2 | Co-produced with Monster Union | |
| My Girlfriend Is the Man! | Massstar | July 23, 2025 | 1 season, 12 episodes | KBS2 | Co-produced with Blossom Entertainment, Play Grounds | |
| The Legend of Kitchen Soldier | J Robin | May 11, 2026 | 1 season, 12 episodes | TVING | Co-produced with Studio Dragon | |
| Four Hands, Two Sonatas | —N/a | August 29, 2026 | 1 season, 12 episodes | tvN | Co-produced with Studio Dragon and Namoo Actors | |
| The Remarried Empress | Herelee | November 3, 2026 | 1 season, 10 episodes | Disney+ | —N/a | |
| This Life to the Next | Jo Joo-hee | TBA | TBA | TBA | Co-produced with Huayi Brothers Korea | |
| Horror and Romance | LUCID | TBA | TBA | TBA | Co-produced with Bon Factory Worldwide | |
| Gosu | Ryu Gi-un, Mun Jeong-hoo | TBA | TBA | TBA | Co-produced with Toei Animation and Studio Mir | |
| Nano List | Min Song-a | TBA | TBA | TVING | Co-produced with Studio Gale | |
| Pigpen | Kim Carnby, Cheon Beom-sick | TBA | TBA | TBA | Co-produced with Impetus Pictures | |

=== Films ===
| Title | Webtoon author | Premiere | Format | Distribution | Notes | Ref. |
|---|---|---|---|---|---|---|
| Unlocked | N/A (Note: A local movie adaptation of the Japanese novel Sumaho o Otoshita dake by Akira Teshigawara.) | February 17, 2022 | Live action | Netflix | | |
| Brave Citizen | Kim Jung-hyun | October 25, 2023 | Live action | Wavve | | |
| My Daughter Is a Zombie | Lee Yun-chang | July 30, 2025 | Live action | Next Entertainment World | | |
| Yumi's Cells: The Movie | Lee Dong-gun | April 3, 2024 | Animation | CJ CGV, Lotte Cultureworks and Lotte Cinema | Co-produced with Locus Animation | |
| Your Letter | Cho Hyun-ah | October 1, 2025 | Animation | Lotte Entertainment | Co-produced with sister company Life Is Comic (LICO) | |
| Vigilante | CRG, Kim Gyu-sam | TBA | Live action | TBA | TV serial and film adaptation | |
| The Sound of Your Heart | Jo Seok | TBA | Live action | TBA | | |
| Three | HAN | TBA | Live action | TBA | Co-produced with Curo Holdings | |
| Blood for Blood | Yeon Jae-won | TBA | Live action | TBA | Co-produced with Bidangil Pictures | |
| Ghostwriter | Beom Woo | TBA | Live action | TBA | Co-produced with Oscar 10 Studio | |
