= Gosu (manhwa) =

South Korean webtoon

- Volume 1 cover, featuring Gang Yong

고수 RR: Gosu MR: Kosu
- Genre: Action, adventure, historical, martial arts
- Author: Ryu Ki-woon
- Illustrator: Moon Jung-hoo
- Webtoon service: Naver Webtoon (Korean); Line Webtoon (English)
- Original run: September 13, 2015 – February 23, 2023
- Volumes: 16

Prequel(s)
- Yongbi the Invincible (1996–2002); Yongbi the Invincible: A Side Story (2006–2013)
- Anime
- Studio: Toei Animation; Studio Mir; Studio N

Gosu (Korean: 고수), also alternatively translated as Gosu: The Master, is a South Korean manhwa released as a webtoon written by Ryu Ki-woon and illustrated by Moon Jung-hoo. It has been serialized in Naver Corporation's webtoon platform Naver Webtoon since September 2015 with the individual chapters collected and published into fifteen volumes as of February 2024. Gosu received official English translations by Line Webtoon beginning in 2015. Gosu is a sequel to the Yongbi Bulpae (Yongbi the Invincible) manhwa, which was serialized from 1996 to 2002.

Giun Ryu and Mun Jeong Hoo launched the comic in Naver in 2015, and ended the series in February 2023. By 2023, the webtoon has crossed 1.4 billion views.

A Japanese-South Korean anime adaptation by Toei Animation, Studio Mir and Studio N has been announced.

== Plot ==
Gang Yong, a disciple of Dokgo Ryong, Supreme Overlord of the chaotic murim, who has been Equipped with the superior martial techniques of his master, sets foot in the world of murim to take revenge on the four Heavenly Kings who betrayed and tried to kill his master, he is ready to bring fear and confusion to the world of murim. But later, he finds out that the four kings who tried to kill his master are already dead.

== Media ==
=== Webtoon ===
Giun Ryu and Mun Jeong Hoo launched the comic in Naver in 2015, and ended the series on February 23, 2023. The webtoon is also available in English, Chinese, and Japanese.

Gosu is a sequel to the Yongbi Bulpae (Yongbi the Invincible) manhwa, which was serialized from 1998 to 2002. Yongbi Bulpae Oejeon (Yongbi the Invincible: A Side Story), A side story of Yongbi ran from 2006 to 2013.

In December 2019, the Webtoon return after one-year hiatus due to the writer's health problems, the series resumed on the 18th.

==== Volume list ====
No.	Korean release date	Korean ISBN
1	September 25, 2022	979-1-16-927883-6
2	September 25, 2022	979-1-16-927884-3
3	September 25, 2022	979-1-16-927885-0
4	September 25, 2022	979-1-16-927886-7
5	September 25, 2022	979-1-16-927887-4
6	September 25, 2022	979-1-16-927888-1
7	December 25, 2022	979-1-16-947364-4
8	December 25, 2022	979-1-16-947365-1
9	January 25, 2023	979-1-16-947756-7
10	April 25, 2023	979-1-16-947757-4
11	April 25, 2023	979-1-14-110320-0
12	June 23, 2023	979-1-14-111093-2
13	July 23, 2023	979-1-14-111318-6
14	September 25, 2023	979-1-14-111319-3
15	February 25, 2024	979-1-14-111629-3
16	February 25, 2024	979-1-14-111630-9

=== Game ===
Gosu, which is considered a martial arts action masterpiece in Naver Webtoon, is being developed as a mobile game. The mobile game is being based on Unreal Engine and claims to be a turn-based strategic RPG. Martial arts webtoon 'Gosu' reborn as a role-playing game Naver Webtoon announced that it is accepting advance reservations for the mobile game Gosu: Absolute Supreme' based on the webtoon 'Gosu. The game is the second self-published case by Studio LICO, a subsidiary of Naver Webtoon, following Yumi's Cells The Puzzle.

On March 29, 2023, Naver Webtoon had officially released the mobile role-playing game (RPG) Gosu: Absolute Supreme.

=== Anime ===
On April 17, 2023, a Japanese-South Korean anime adaptation by Toei Animation and Studio N was announced. On September 24, 2024, Studio Mir confirmed on their X account that they are also working on the adaptation.

== Reception ==
The webtoon won the Presidential Award in the cartoon category at the 2016 Korea Contents Awards, and was praised as a monumental work that made a mark on traditional Korean martial arts. By 2023, the series has crossed 1.4 billion views.

Gosu evaluated as the best martial arts work on Naver Webtoon. Based on the vast world view, the webtoon attracted attention by showing high-quality drawing and well-organized story every time. Not only was it popular with male readers in their 30s and 40s who prefer the martial arts genre, but it also received a great response from readers in their 10s and 20s, maintaining the top spot on the webtoon of the week throughout the series.
