= Let Me Be Your Knight =

2021 South Korean musical romantic drama

- Promotional poster
- Hangul: 너의 밤이 되어줄게
- Lit.: I'll Be Your Night
- RR: Neoui bami doeeojulge
- MR: Nŏŭi pami toeŏjulge
- Genre: Romantic comedy; Musical
- Created by: Park Yoo-soo
- Developed by: SBS (Plan Production)
- Written by: Seo Jeong-eun; Yoo So-won
- Directed by: Ahn Ji-sook
- Starring: Jung In-sun; Lee Jun-young; Jang Dong-joo; Kim Dong-hyun; Kim Jong-hyun; Yoon Ji-sung
- Music by: Lee Jae-chun (music manager)
- Country of origin: South Korea
- Original language: Korean
- No. of episodes: 12

Production
- Executive producers: Jang Seong-wook; Lee Tae-kyung CP; Kim Eun-mi CP
- Producers: Shin In-soo; Hwang Dong-seop; Lee Seong-jin; Hong Yong-seok
- Running time: 70 minutes
- Production companies: Big Ocean ENM; Super Moon Pictures

Original release
- Network: SBS TV
- Release: November 7, 2021 – January 24, 2022

Let Me Be Your Knight (Korean: 너의 밤이 되어줄게) is a South Korean television series directed by Ahn Ji-sook and written by Seo Jeong-eun and Yoo So-won. Starring Jung In-sun along with members of fictitious band Luna: Lee Jun-young, Jang Dong-joo, Kim Jong-hyun, Kim Dong-hyun and Yoon Ji-sung, the series depicts a romance between a world star idol suffering from sleepwalking and a resident doctor who has to secretly treat it. The series premiered on SBS TV on November 7, 2021, and aired every Sunday, at 23:05 (KST) till January 24, 2022. It is available for streaming on iQIYI in selected territories.

== Synopsis ==
This series follows the lead singer of a popular idol band Luna, Yoon Tae-in who suffers from sleepwalking. To cure his condition secretly, he seeks help from a live-in doctor In Yoon-ju to cure his condition.

== Cast and characters ==
=== Main ===
- Jung In-sun as
  - In Yoon-joo, 29 years old, got mistaken as her sister, a doctor, and becomes the live-in doctor who treats Yoon Tae-in for his condition.
  - Kang Seon-joo, 29 years old, Yoon-ju's identical twin sister who is a sleep disorder doctor, her American name is Catherine Seon-joo Kang, and her Korean name was In Seon-joo. She was adopted in the United States by a couple at the age of 11.

=== Luna members ===
- Lee Jun-young as Yoon Tae-in - 25 years old, Luna's leader, main vocalist, producer.
- Jang Dong-joo as Seo Woo-yeon, 25 years old - Luna's guitarist and sub vocalist who develops a crush on Yoon-joo thinking she's Seon-joo.
- Kim Jong-hyun as Lee Shin - 23 years old, Luna's bassist, sub vocalist.
- Yoon Ji-sung as Kim Yoo-chan - 26 years old, Luna's drummer and sub vocalist.
- Kim Dong-hyun as Woo Ga-on - 21 years old, Luna's keyboardist and sub vocalist.

=== Others ===
- Kim Kyung-ho as No Sang-hoon, in late 20's, member of new idol group Bluemoon.
- Seo Hye-won as Jeong Ba-reun- 29 years old, Yoon-ju's best friend and a cafe owner
- Ha Young as Chae Ji-yeon- 29 years old, she is in a secret relationship with Luna's Lee Shin, Jang Enter's actor
- Kwak Jae-hyung as Representative Moon- in late 40s, CEO of MM Entertainment, to which Luna belongs
- Choi Hwani as Gil Soonnam- 29 years old, employee of MM Entertainment, Manager/ Director of 'Luna'
- Lee Se-chang as Representative Jang, in late 40s, CEO of entertainment agency Jang Entertainment. Daughter is Ji-yeon.
- Park Ji-won as Hyobin- 21 years old, a member of MM Entertainment, one of the top solo singers in Korea. She likes Shin.
- Joo-ah as Kim Yeon-jeong, broadcast station writer
- Park So-eun as Hong Jae-eun is an employee of MM Entertainment's PR team.

=== Special appearance ===
- Lee Jae-yoon as judo master
- Kang Ji-young as Nina

A singer-songwriter artist from Luna's agency

== Production ==
Lee Jun-young was confirmed to appear as the main character in the series on November 22, 2019. On August 30, 2021, the cast of the miniseries was confirmed. It was revealed that Jung In-sun, Lee Jun-young, Jang Dong-joo, Kim Jong-hyun, singer Yoon Ji-sung, and Kim Dong-hyun will be appearing as main characters in the series. Script reading site was revealed on September 28 by releasing photographs. One week later, on October 5 behind-the-scenes footage of the Luna band ensemble was released.

== Release ==
Let Me Be Your Knight is released in Japan, Hong Kong, Taiwan, Malaysia, Indonesia, the Philippines, Vietnam, and Thailand, as well as all over Southeast Asia, North America, South America, Australia, Europe, and the Middle East. On September 9, it was reported that Japan has signed a contract with Corpus Korea, a company specialising in overseas distribution of Hallyu content. In Southeast Asia and Taiwan iQIYI International and in Hong Kong Now TV will air the series. Viki will be streaming the series in America, Europe, Australia, and the Middle East. It premiered in South Korea on SBS TV on November 7, 2021, and aired every Sunday, at 23:05 (KST).

== Original soundtrack ==
Let Me Be Your Knight

Soundtrack album by Various
- Released: 2021
- Genre: Soundtrack
- Languages: Korean; English
- Labels: Dreamus; The Groove Company by Big Ocean ENM

=== Part 1 ===
Released on November 15, 2021
No.	Title	Lyrics	Music	Artist	Length
1.	"Because It's You" (너니까)	Red Socks, INAN	Red Socks, INAN	Kim Woo-jin	3:47
2.	"Because It's You" (Inst.)		Red Socks, INAN		3:47

=== Part 2 ===
Released on November 22, 2021
No.	Title	Lyrics	Music	Artist	Length
1.	"Your Bright Smile Is on the Clouds in the Sky" (너의 환한 미소가 하늘 구름 위에 있어)	Celine, Park Do-hyun	Oh Seong-hoon	Sunny	3:47
2.	"Your Bright Smile Is on the Clouds in the Sky" (Inst.)		Oh Seong-hoon		3:47

=== Part 3 ===
Released on December 6, 2021
No.	Title	Lyrics	Music	Artist	Length
1.	"Dreaming"	NILE (Nile)	Kim Seong-tae	Seo Eun-kwang(BtoB)	3:20
2.	"Dreaming" (Inst.)				3:20

=== Part 4 ===
Released on January 10, 2022
No.	Title	Lyrics	Music	Artist	Length
1.	"Rainbow"	Celine, Kangaroo	Celine, Kangaroo	Celine	3:21
2.	"Rainbow" (Inst.)				3:21

== Ratings ==
Average TV viewership ratings (nationwide)
Ep.	Original broadcast date	Average audience share (Nielsen Korea)
1	November 7, 2021	2.1% (39th)
2	November 14, 2021	1.4% (58th)
3	November 21, 2021	1.4% (57th)
4	November 28, 2021	1.2% (60th)
5	December 5, 2021	1.6% (51st)
6	December 12, 2021	1.7% (51st)
7	December 19, 2021	1.2% (60th)
8	January 2, 2022 (Note: The 8th episode did not air on December 26, 2021.)	1.5% (55th)
9	January 9, 2022	1.7% (58th)
10	January 16, 2022	1.7% (54th)
11	January 23, 2022	1.8% (54th)
12	January 24, 2022 (Note: 12th episode will be aired from 0:15 (KST) on the 24th instead of January 30 because of the Lunar New Year holiday.)	1.1% (67th)
Average		1.5%
In the table above, the blue numbers represent the lowest ratings and the red numbers represent the highest ratings.

== Awards and nominations ==
Name of the award ceremony, year presented, category, nominee of the award, and the result of the nomination
Award ceremony	Year	Category	Nominee / Work	Result	Ref.
SBS Drama Awards	2021	Best Character Award, Actress	Jung In-sun	Nominated	
SBS Drama Awards	2021	Excellence Award, Actor in a Miniseries Romance/Comedy Drama	Lee Jun-young	Nominated	
