= Pump Up the Healthy Love =

2025 South Korean television series

- Promotional poster
- Hangul: 24시 헬스클럽
- Lit.: 24-Hour Health Club
- RR: 24si helseukeulleop
- MR: 24si helsŭk'ŭllŏp
- Genre: Romantic comedy
- Written by: Kim Ji-soo
- Directed by: Park Jun-soo; Choi Yeon-soo
- Starring: Lee Jun-young; Jung Eun-ji
- Music by: Jo Jung-chi
- Country of origin: South Korea
- Original language: Korean
- No. of episodes: 12

Production
- Executive producers: Yoon Jae-hyeok; Oh Jin-seung; Lee Jun-yong; kim Ho-jun
- Producers: Moon Seok-hwan; Oh Kwang-hee; Seok Shin-ho; Park Se-eun; Yoon Na-hyeon; Joo Ji-hoon; Ji Byeong-hyeon; Park Seung-min
- Running time: 70 minutes
- Production companies: CJ ENM Studios; Bon Factory; Monster Union; KeyEast

Original release
- Network: KBS2
- Release: April 30 – June 5, 2025

Pump Up the Healthy Love (Korean: 24시 헬스클럽; lit. '24-Hour Health Club') is a 2025 South Korean television series written by Kim Ji-soo, directed by Park Jun-soo, Choi Yeon-soo and starring Lee Jun-young and Jung Eun-ji. It aired on KBS2 from April 30, to June 5, 2025, every Wednesday and Thursday at 21:50 (KST).

The drama continued a trend of free-to-air prime time Wednesday-Thursday dramas languishing in the 0% viewership range in 2025. Its eleventh episode on June 4 drew a nationwide rating of 0.7%, a record low shared with the February 20 and May 3 episodes of Kick Kick Kick Kick and Crushology 101, respectively.

== Synopsis ==
The romantic comedy drama focuses on a fitness-obsessed gym owner who lives by the motto "It all begins and ends with muscle" who meets a woman just starting her own fitness journey.

== Cast ==
=== Main ===
- Lee Jun-young as Do Hyeon-joong
- Jung Eun-ji as Lee Mi-ran

=== Supporting ===
- Lee Mi-do as Rosa
- Lee Seung-woo as Alex
- Park Sung-yeon as Im Seong-im
- Lee Ji-hye as Yoon Bu-young
- Hong Yun-hwa as Park Dul-hee
- Kim Kwon as Lee Ro-yi

== Production ==
=== Development ===
The drama was developed under the working title 24-Hour Health Club, is directed by Park Jun-soo, who directed Gaus Electronics (2022) and written by Kim Ji-soo, who wrote Birthcare Center (2020).

=== Casting ===
On July 31, 2024, Lee Jun-young and Jung Eun-ji were reportedly cast as the main characters and were considering it.

== Ratings ==
Average TV viewership ratings (Nationwide)
| Ep. | Original broadcast date | Average audience share (Nielsen Korea) |
|---|---|---|
| 1 | April 30, 2025 | 1.8% (26th) |
| 2 | May 1, 2025 | 1.8% (36th) |
| 3 | May 7, 2025 | 1.5% (29th) |
| 4 | May 8, 2025 | 1.7% (28th) |
| 5 | May 14, 2025 | 1.1% (33rd) |
| 6 | May 15, 2025 | 1.3% (33rd) |
| 7 | May 21, 2025 | 1.1% (35th) |
| 8 | May 22, 2025 | 1.2% (35th) |
| 9 | May 28, 2025 | 1.0% (37th) |
| 10 | May 29, 2025 | 1.1% (35th) |
| 11 | June 4, 2025 | 0.7% (50th) |
| 12 | June 5, 2025 | 1.0% (43rd) |
| Average | | 1.3% |
In the table above, the blue numbers represent the lowest ratings and the red numbers represent the highest ratings.

== Awards and nominations ==
Name of the award ceremony, year presented, category, nominee of the award, and the result of the nomination
| Award ceremony | Year | Category | Nominee / Work | Result | Ref. |
|---|---|---|---|---|---|
| KBS Drama Awards | 2025 | Top Excellence Award, Actor | Lee Jun-young | Nominated | |
| KBS Drama Awards | 2025 | Excellence Award, Actor in a Miniseries | Lee Jun-young | Won | |
| KBS Drama Awards | 2025 | Popularity Award | Lee Jun-young | Won | |
| KBS Drama Awards | 2025 | Popularity Award | Jung Eun-ji | Won | |
| KBS Drama Awards | 2025 | Excellence Award, Actress in a Miniseries | Jung Eun-ji | Nominated | |
| KBS Drama Awards | 2025 | Best Couple | Lee Jun-young and Jung Eun-ji | Won | |
| KBS Drama Awards | 2025 | Best Supporting Actress | Lee Mi-do | Nominated | |
