= Let's Eat 3 =

2018 South Korean TV series

- Promotional poster
- Also known as: Let's Eat: Begins
- Hangul: 식사를 합시다 3
- RR: Siksareul hapsida 3
- MR: Siksarŭl hapsida 3
- Genre: Slice-of-life; Romance
- Created by: Lee Myung-han (tvN)
- Written by: Im Soo-mi
- Directed by: Choi Gyu-sik
- Starring: Yoon Doo-joon; Baek Jin-hee
- Country of origin: South Korea
- Original language: Korean
- No. of episodes: 14

Production
- Executive producer: Park Jae-sam
- Production company: Celltrion Entertainment

Original release
- Network: tvN
- Release: July 16 – August 28, 2018

Let's Eat 3 (Korean: 식샤를 합시다 3; RR: Siksyareul hapsida 3) is a 2018 South Korean television series starring Yoon Doo-joon and Baek Jin-hee. This is the third season of 2013 Let's Eat series, with Yoon Doo-joon reprising his role as Goo Dae-young in both the first and second season. It aired on tvN from July 16 to August 28, 2018.

== Synopsis ==
Goo Dae-young has fallen into a slump in his thirties. In order to heal his wounds, he embarks on a journey to revisit the food that he loved in his twenties with former college classmate Lee Ji-woo, and the two not only share their meals but also relive their memories of the past.

== Cast ==
=== Main ===
- Yoon Doo-joon as Goo Dae-young
- Baek Jin-hee as Lee Ji-woo
- Lee Joo-woo as Lee Seo-yeon
- Ahn Woo-yeon as Sunwoo Sun

=== Recurring ===
- Byung Hun as Kim Jin-seok
- Kim Dong-young as Bae Byung-sam
- Yang Kyung-won as Jang
- Seo Byeock-joon as Lee Sung-joo
- Noh Susanna as Heo Yoon-ji
- Lee Ji-hyun as Kim Mi-sook
- Park Han-sol as Bak Han-sol
- Shin Soo-hang
- Byun Woo-seok

=== Special appearances ===
- Seo Hyun-jin as Baek Su-ji (ep. 2)
- Lee Joo-seung as Ahn Chan-soo (ep. 1)

== Production ==
The first script reading was held on May 17, 2018.

The series was reduced from 16 to 14 episodes due to the sudden draft notice of lead actor Yoon Doo-joon.

== Original soundtrack ==
Let's Eat 3 OST

Soundtrack album by Various artists
- Released: 2018
- Genre: Soundtrack
- Languages: Korean; English
- Labels: Stone Music Entertainment, Pop Music

=== Part 1 ===
Released on July 24, 2018
No.	Title	Lyrics	Music	Artist	Length
1.	"Your Day" (축제)	Kim Ho-kyung	1601	ONF	03:16
2.	"Your Day" (Inst.)		1601		03:16
Total length:					06:32

=== Part 2 ===
Released on July 31, 2018
No.	Title	Lyrics	Music	Artist	Length
1.	"Curious" (궁금해)	EDEN, Lucy	EDEN, BUDDY	EDEN	03:41
2.	"Curious" (Inst.)		EDEN, BUDDY		03:41
Total length:					07:22

=== Part 3 ===
Released on August 7, 2018
No.	Title	Lyrics	Music	Artist	Length
1.	"Just This Song" (이 노래만)	Kim Ho-kyung	1601	Yuju (GFriend)	04:11
2.	"Just This Song" (Inst.)		1601		04:11
Total length:					08:22

=== Part 4 ===
Released on August 14, 2018
No.	Title	Lyrics	Music	Artist	Length
1.	"I Still" (그래도 나)	Tei	1601	Yang Yo-seob (Highlight)	04:14
2.	"I Still" (Inst.)		1601		04:14
Total length:					08:28

=== Part 5 ===
Released on August 21, 2018
No.	Title	Lyrics	Music	Artist	Length
1.	"Fluttering" (설렘각)	POPKID, IMAGES	POPKID, IMAGES	Taeil (Block B)	03:33
2.	"Fluttering" (Inst.)		POPKID, IMAGES		03:33
Total length:					07:06

=== Part 6 ===
Released on August 28, 2018
No.	Title	Lyrics	Music	Artist	Length
1.	"Wonder What You Do" (어디서 뭐해요)	Midnight Dive, Kim Jin-sol	Kiggen, Kim Jin-sol	Hailey	03:30
2.	"Wonder What You Do" (Inst.)		Kiggen, Kim Jin-sol		03:30
Total length:					07:00

=== Part 7 ===
Released on August 29, 2018
No.	Title	Lyrics	Music	Artist	Length
1.	"Same Memories" (같은 기억)	Lee Jong-soo, Arie, Kassy	Lee Jong-soo	Kassy	03:21
2.	"Same Memories" (Inst.)		Lee Jong-soo		03:21
Total length:					06:42

== Ratings ==
Let's Eat 3 : South Korea viewers per episode (thousands)

Season	Episode number														Average
Season	1	2	3	4	5	6	7	8	9	10	11	12	13	14	Average
1	606	626	553	663	575	574	527	576	551	525	506	511	632	704	581

Source: Audience measurement performed nationwide by Nielsen Media Research.

Average TV viewership ratings
Ep.	Original broadcast date	Average audience share (AGB Nielsen)	
Ep.	Original broadcast date	Nationwide	Seoul
1	July 16, 2018	2.375%	2.633%
2	July 17, 2018	2.459%	2.774%
3	July 23, 2018	2.368%	2.786%
4	July 24, 2018	2.700%	3.529%
5	July 30, 2018	2.477%	3.176%
6	July 31, 2018	2.396%	3.167%
7	August 6, 2018	2.384%	2.981%
8	August 7, 2018	2.617%	3.345%
9	August 13, 2018	2.212%	2.406%
10	August 14, 2018	2.405%	3.062%
11	August 20, 2018	2.234%	2.769%
12	August 21, 2018	2.205%	2.741%
13	August 27, 2018	2.722%	2.915%
14	August 28, 2018	3.239%	3.933%
Average		2.485%	3.016%
In the table above, the blue numbers represent the lowest ratings and the red numbers represent the highest ratings.; This drama airs on a cable channel/pay TV which normally has a relatively smaller audience compared to free-to-air TV/public broadcasters (KBS, SBS, MBC and EBS).
