= Kim Kang-min (actor, born 1995) =

South Korean actor

- Born: August 17, 1995 (age 30); South Korea
- Occupations: Actor; model
- Years active: 2019–present
- Agent: Billions
- Height: 188 cm (6 ft 2 in)

Korean name
- Hangul: 김강민
- RR: Gim Gangmin
- MR: Kim Kangmin

Kim Kang-min (Korean: 김강민; born August 17, 1995) is a South Korean actor and model. He made his acting debut on the web series Maybe, Maybe Not (2019). He gained recognition for his lead roles in the web series Please, Summer (2020) and the BL series My Bias Is Showing?! (2025).

== Filmography ==
=== Film ===
Year	Title	Role	Ref.
2022	My Perfect Roommate		

=== Television series ===
Year	Title	Role	Notes	Ref.
2020	Soul Mechanic	Kim Young-seok		
2021	My Roommate Is a Gumiho	Jungsuk		
2021	The Red Sleeve	Kim Du-seong		
2022	It's Beautiful Now	Hyun Jung-hoo		

=== Web series ===
Year	Title	Role	Notes	Ref.
2019	Maybe, Maybe Not	Cheon Jung-seok	Acting debut	
2019	Like	Kang Seo-joon		
2020	Please, Summer	Kang Hyuk		
2025	My Bias Is Showing?!	Choi Si-yeol		
