= Park Jae-chan =

South Korean musician (born 2001)

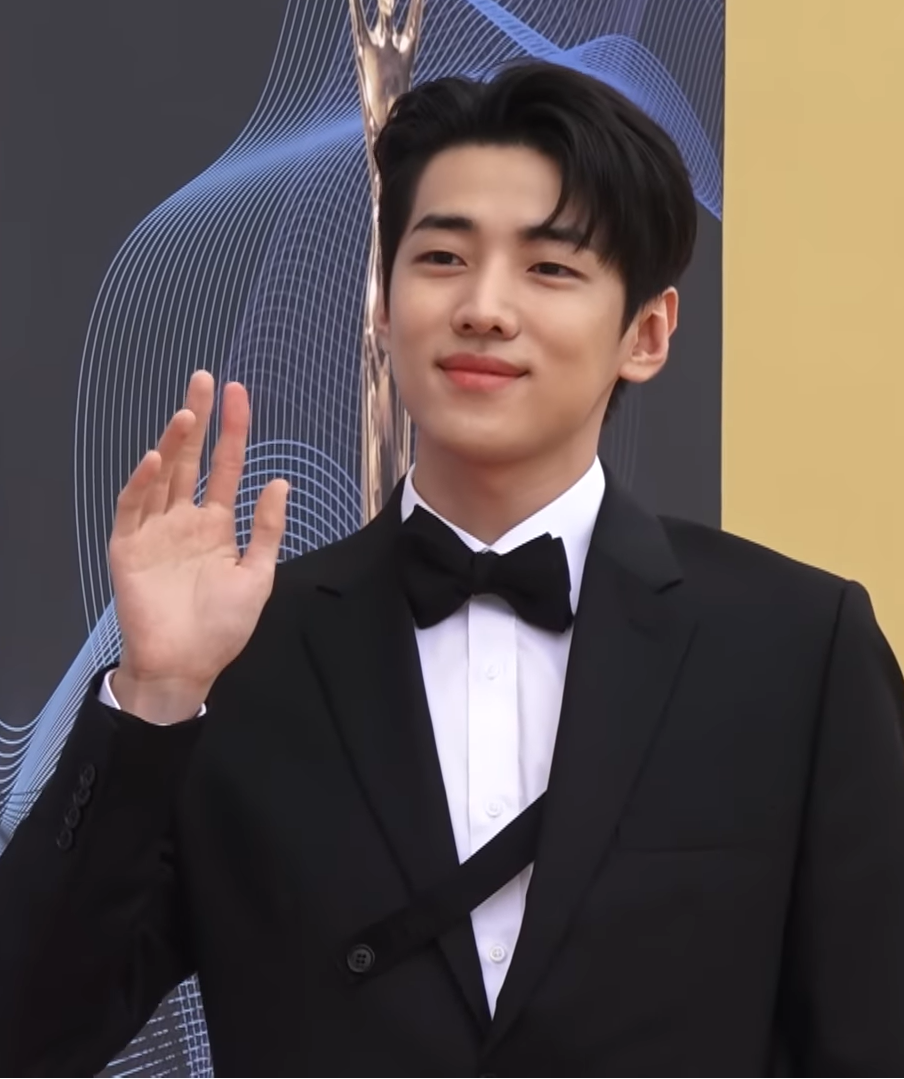
- Jaechan in 2022
- Born: December 6, 2001 (age 24); Daegu, North Gyeongsang Province, South Korea
- Education: Global Cyber University
- Occupations: Singer; actor; songwriter
- Musical career
- Genre: K-pop
- Instrument: Vocals
- Years active: 2019–present
- Label: Dongyo
- Formerly of: DKZ; Dongkiz I:Kan

Korean name
- Hangul: 박재찬
- RR: Bak Jaechan
- MR: Pak Chaech'an
- Website: dongyoent.com

Park Jae-chan (Korean: 박재찬; born December 6, 2001), better known mononymously as Jaechan, is a South Korean singer, actor, and songwriter. He was a member of the K-pop boy group DKZ and was a member of its sub-unit Dongkiz I:Kan. As an actor, he is best known for his portrayal of Choo Sang-woo in the web novel-adapted drama series Semantic Error.

== Early life and education ==
Park Jae-chan was born on December 6, 2001, in Daegu, South Korea. His interest in music began in middle school upon hearing Justin Bieber's songs. During high school, Jaechan received his GED and became a trainee.

In 2022, he entered the Department of Broadcasting and Entertainment at Global Cyber University together with his fellow members.

== Career ==
=== Musical career ===
Jaechan officially debuted as a member of Dongkiz with the release of their single album, Dongkiz on the Block, on April 24, 2019. He is known as the rapper of Dongkiz. Jaechan also wrote and produce several songs for the group.

On July 7, 2020, Jaechan alongside fellow Dongkiz member Munik formed the sub-group Dongkiz I:Kan. The group debuted with the single album Y.O.U.

Jaechan's group rebranded from Dongkiz to DKZ on March 18, 2022. It was also during this time that his rise to fame courtesy of his BL drama, Semantic Error, had led the group to increase its album sales and popularity.

On September 6, 2023, Jaechan made his debut as a solo artist. He held a showcase at Yes24 Live Hall, where he presented his first solo mini album JC Factory. The EP consists of five self-composed songs including the lead single "Hello" and his earlier pre-released song "Time". He won his first music show award as a soloist in SBS M's The Show for "Hello" on September 19.

On May 16, 2025, Jaechan released his second mini album JC Factory Vol.2. The EP consists of five songs including the lead single "Poster Boy" and his solo version of their previously released sub-unit single "Y.O.U".

=== Acting career ===
In 2019, Jaechan got his first main role in a Tooniverse web drama, My YouTube Diary, along with his co-member, Munik.

On January 12, 2022, South Korean streaming television series Watcha announced that Park Jae-chan would take the lead role in the live series adaptation of BL web novel Semantic Error. The popularity of the series led to a surge in support for DKZ. In April 2022, Jaechan was included in Forbes Korea's 2022 Korea Power Celebrity 40 - Rising Star for the attention he gained for his portrayal in Semantic Error.

== Discography ==
=== Extended plays ===
List of extended plays, with selected details, peak chart positions, and sales
Title	Details	Peak chart positions	Sales
Title	Details	KOR	Sales
JC Factory	Released: September 6, 2023; Labels: Dongyo Entertainment, Genie Music; Formats: CD, digital download, streaming; Track listing: 1. "Hello"; 2. "Oh Girl"; 3. "MAYB" (어쩜; featuring Nathania); 4. "Replay"; 5. "Time" (시간)	10	KOR: 88,615
JC Factory Vol.2	Released: May 16, 2025; Labels: Dongyo Entertainment, Genie Music; Formats: CD, digital download, streaming; Track listing: 1. "Poster Boy"; 2. "Paradise"; 3. "The Light"; 4. "Step to You"; 5. "Y.O.U" (solo ver.)	11	KOR: 90,136

=== Singles ===
List of singles, showing year released, peak chart positions, and album name
Title	Year	Peak chart positions	Album
Title	Year	KOR	Album
As lead artist
"Hello"	2023	38	JC Factory
"Poster Boy"	2025	— (Note: "Poster Boy" did not enter the Circle Digital Chart, but appeared at number 156 on the component Download Chart.)	JC Factory Vol.2
Soundtrack appearances
"Our Season" (나의 계절에게)	2022	— (Note: "Our Season" did not enter the Circle Digital Chart, but appeared at number 15 on the component Download Chart.)	Our Season: Spring with Park Jaechan OST
"—" denotes releases that did not chart or were not released in that region.

=== Other charted songs ===
List of other charted songs, showing year released, chart positions and album name
Title	Year	Peak chart positions	Album
Title	Year	KOR Down.	Album
"MAYB" (어쩜) (ft. Nathania)	2023	136	JC Factory
"Oh Girl"	2023	138	JC Factory
"Replay"	2023	141	JC Factory
"Step to You"	2025	192	JC Factory Vol.2
"The Light"	2025	193	JC Factory Vol.2
"Paradise"	2025	195	JC Factory Vol.2
"Y.O.U" (solo ver.)	2025	196	JC Factory Vol.2

=== Music credits ===
Music credits adapted from the Korea Music Copyright Association's database, unless otherwise noted.

Year	Artist	Song	Album	Lyrics		Composition		Arrangement	
Year	Artist	Song	Album	Credited	With	Credited	With	Credited	With
2019	Dongkiz	Dreaming You (상상 속의 너)	"Dreaming You" (상상속의 너)	Yes	Jeong Jae-yeop, Lee Jae-wook	No	—N/a	No	—N/a
2020	Dongkiz	Beautiful (아름다워)	"Ego" (自我)	Yes	Lee Seu-ran, Manseong	No	—N/a	No	—N/a
2020	Dongkiz	It's All Right	Non-album release	Yes	Kyoungyoon, Munik, Wondae, Jonghyeong	Yes	—N/a	Yes	AKB
2021	Dongkiz	Give You	"Youniverse"	Yes	—N/a	Yes	—N/a	Yes	—N/a
2021	Dongkiz	2021 (Memories)	Non-album release	Yes	Kyoungyoon, Jonghyeong	Yes	Cray Bin, 소리, ALOHA	No	—N/a
2022	A.C.E, AleXa, BAND FAMOUS, BE'O, cignature, Dongkiz, EVERGLOW, KAACHI, MAJORS, MCND, San E, Kim Sehwang, Woo Jeewon, YEGNY, YOURS	BETTER TOGETHER (To Beat Covid-19) [prod. SL.P]	Non-album release	Yes	CASTLE J, BE'O, 류호석, San E	No	—N/a	No	—N/a
2022	DKZ	Cupid (사랑도둑) (Acoustic ver.)	"Chase Episode 2. Maum"	No	—N/a	No	—N/a	Yes	Cray Bin, Kyoungyoon
2022	Himself	Our Season (나의계절에게)	Non-album release	Yes	—N/a	Yes	Cray Bin	Yes	Cray Bin, Zwoo, Aloha, Kim Daehyun
2022	DKZ	Uh-Heung (호랑이가 쫓아온다)	"Chase Episode 3. Beum"	Yes	Cray Bin	No	—N/a	No	—N/a
2022	DKZ	2022 (Forever)	"DKZ Year End Project Song 'It's All Right Part.3'"	Yes	Mingyu, Kyoungyoon, Sehyeon, Jonghyeong, Giseok	Yes	—N/a	No	—N/a
2023	DKZ	Harmony	"Harmony"	Yes	Cray Bin	No	—N/a	No	—N/a
2023	Himself	Hello	"JC Factory"	Yes	Yoon Ye-ji, Lee Hye-ryeon, Yoonyoon	Yes	Jabong, Blood Circle, Sam Carter	No	—N/a
2023	Himself	MAYB (어쩜) (ft. Nathania)	"JC Factory"	Yes	CiELO	Yes	CiELO	No	—N/a
2023	Himself	Time	"JC Factory"	Yes	—N/a	Yes	Blood Circle, Ha Heon-je	No	—N/a
2023	Himself	Replay	"JC Factory"	Yes	—N/a	Yes	BlueRhythm, CLEF CREW	No	—N/a
2023	Himself	Oh Girl	"JC Factory"	Yes	—N/a	Yes	Cray Bin	No	—N/a
2023	DKZ	2023 (Friends)	"DKZ Year End Project Song 'It's All Right Part.4'"	Yes	Mingyu, Sehyeon, Jonghyeong, Giseok	No	—N/a	Yes	Lee Dabin, Sori, Kim Minjeong, Kim Daehyun, Mingyu
2025	DKZ	2024 (Wishlist)	"DKZ Year End Project Song 'It's All Right Part.5'"	Yes	Mingyu, Sehyeon, Jonghyeong, Giseok	Yes	Jonghyeong	Yes	Lee Dabin, Sori, Kim Minjeong, Kim Daehyun, Jonghyeong
2025	Himself	Paradise	"JC Factory Vol.2"	Yes	—N/a	Yes	Cray Bin, Riri, Aloha, Kim Dae-hyun	No	—N/a
2025	Himself	Step to You	"JC Factory Vol.2"	Yes	—N/a	Yes	Mehigh, Sun Moses	No	—N/a
2025	Himself	The Light	"JC Factory Vol.2"	Yes	Ruby Baek, Shico	Yes	Ruby Baek	No	—N/a

== Filmography ==
=== Film ===
Year	Title	Role	Notes	Ref.
2022	Semantic Error: The Movie	Choo Sang Woo	Main cast	

=== Television series ===
Year	Title	Role	Notes	Ref.
2024	Bitter Sweet Hell	Choi Do-hyun		
2024	My Sweet Mobster	Seo Dong Hee		
2024	Check-in Hanyang	Go Soo-ra		

=== Web series ===
Year	Title	Platform	Role	Notes	Ref.
2019	My YouTube Diary	Tooniverse	Kang Heon / "Sweet Honey"	Supporting role	
2020	My YouTube Diary 2	Tooniverse	Kang Heon	Cameo appearance (Ep. 1)	
2020	Can You Deliver Time?	YouTube	Kim Do Hyun	Leading role (Ep. 5–7)	
2020	No Going Back Romance	Naver TV, V Live	Jung Han Kyul	Leading role	
2020	YouTuber Class	Naver TV, V Live	Park Bo Hyun	Leading role	
2021	I:LOVE:DM	V Live	Park Jae Chan	Leading role	
2021	Youtuber Class Season 2	Naver TV	Park Bo Hyun	Leading role	
2021	Cotton Candy Youngest Manager's Diary	YouTube	Himself / Manager of Cotton Candy	Spin-off of Idol: The Coup	
2022	Semantic Error	WATCHA	Chu Sang Woo	Leading role	

=== Television show ===
Year	Title	Network	Role	Notes	Ref.
2020	King of Mask Singer	MBC TV	Contestant	Cheerful Manga (Ep. 281)	

=== Web shows ===
Year	Title	Platform	Role	Ref.
2022	Our Season: Spring with Park Jae Chan	WATCHA & GagaOOLala	Himself	
2022–2023	It's A Dream	Naver NOW	Host	

=== Radio show ===
Year	Title	Station	Role	Notes	Ref.
2022	Station Z	KBS Cool FM	DJ	May 25, 2022 – August 17, 2022	

== Accolades ==
=== Awards and nominations ===
Name of the award ceremony, year presented, award category, nominee(s) of the award, and the result of the nomination
Award	Year	Category	Nominee(s) / Work(s)	Result	Ref.
APAN Star Awards	2022	Popularity Star Award (Actor)	Semantic Error	Won	
APAN Star Awards	2022	Best Couple Award	Park Jae-chan (with Park Seo-ham); Semantic Error	Won	
APAN Star Awards	2023	Popularity Star Award (Actor)	Park Jae-chan	Nominated	
APAN Star Awards	2023	Global Star Award	Park Jae-chan	Nominated	
Asia Artist Awards	2022	Idol Plus Popularity Award (Actor)	Park Jae-chan	Nominated	
Asia Artist Awards	2023	Popularity Award (Actor)	Park Jae-chan	Nominated	
Asia Artist Awards	2023	New Wave Award (Television/Film)	Park Jae-chan	Won	
Asia Artist Awards	2024	Popularity Award (Actor)	Park Jae-chan	Nominated	
Blue Dragon Series Awards	2022	Best New Actor	Semantic Error	Nominated	
Blue Dragon Series Awards	2022	Popular Star Award	Park Jae-chan	Won	
Blue Dragon Series Awards	2023	Popular Star Award	Park Jae-chan	Won	
Blue Dragon Series Awards	2023	OST Popularity Award	"Our Season"; Our Season: Spring with Park Jae-chan	Won	
Brand of the Year Awards (Note: Established in 2003, the Brand of the Year Awards is an awards ceremony based on nationwide surveys hosted by the Korea Consumer Brand Committee and organized by the Korea Consumer Forum.)	2022	Acting Idol of the Year (Male)	Park Jae-chan	Won	
DFX OTT Awards (Note: Held at the Daejeon Special FX Festival (DSFF), the DFX OTT Awards is an awards ceremony that recognizes special effects, films, and actors who have captured the world's attention.)	2025	Global Star Award (Male)	Check-in Hanyang	Won	
Grand Bell Awards	2022	New Wave Award (Actor)	Semantic Error: The Movie	Won	
Korea Drama Awards	2024	Hot Icon Award	Park Jae-chan	Won	
Korea Drama Awards	2025	Multi-tainer Award	Park Jae-chan	Won	
Korea First Brand Awards (Note: Hosted by the Korea Consumer Brand Committee and supervised by the Korea Consumer Forum, the Korea First Brand Awards selects promising brands that will lead the year and bases its winners on consumption trend analysis, extensive nationwide consumer surveys, and evaluation and deliberation by experts.)	2023	Live Streaming Show DJ	It's a Dream	Won	
Korea First Brand Awards	2024	Male Solo Singer	Park Jae-chan	Nominated	
Korea First Brand Awards	2025	Male Acting Idol	Park Jae-chan	Nominated	
Seoul International Drama Awards	2022	Outstanding K-Pop Idol	Semantic Error	Nominated	
Seoul International Drama Awards	2022	Outstanding Korean Actor	Semantic Error	Nominated	
Weibo Gala	2025	Weibo Thailand Overseas Emerging Power Artist	Park Jae-chan	Won	

=== Listicles ===
Name of publisher, year listed, name of listicle, and placement
Publisher	Year	Listicle	Placement	Ref.
Forbes	2022	Korea Power Celebrity 40 – Rising Star	Placed	
