= Kyoungyoon =

South Korean singer

- 경윤
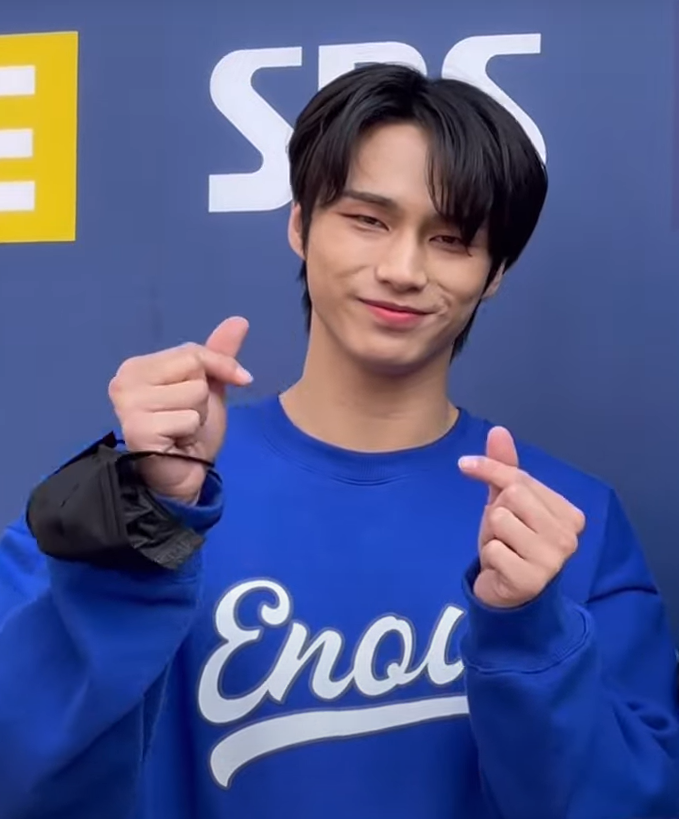
- Kyoungyoon in October 2022
- Born: Lee Kyoung-yoon; February 21, 2000 (age 26); Yeongdeok County, North Gyeongsang Province, South Korea
- Education: Yeongdeok Middle School; Yeongdeok High School; Global Cyber University
- Occupations: Singer; songwriter; actor
- Musical career
- Genre: K-pop
- Instrument: Vocals
- Years active: 2019-present
- Label: Dongyo
- Formerly of: DKZ

Korean name
- Hangul: 이경윤
- RR: I Gyeongyun
- MR: I Kyŏngyun

Lee Kyoung-yoon (Korean: 이경윤, born February 21, 2000), also known by the mononym Kyoungyoon, is a South Korean singer and actor. He is a former member of the boy group DKZ. He received his first main role as a television actor in a June 2021 EBS' international co-production drama, Beasts of Asia. He also starred in musical productions such as Equal and The Three Musketeers.

== Early life and education ==
Lee Kyoung-yoon was born on February 21, 2000, in Yeongdeok County, North Gyeongsang Province, South Korea. Kyoungyoon first dreamed of becoming a singer when he was in middle school after he heard Park Hyo-shin's "Beautiful Tomorrow". Before debuting as an idol, he had been training as an athlete and even formed a band where he was active as a guitarist and vocalist.

After graduating from high school, Kyoungyoon entered the Department of Broadcasting and Entertainment at Global Cyber University.

== Career ==
=== DKZ ===
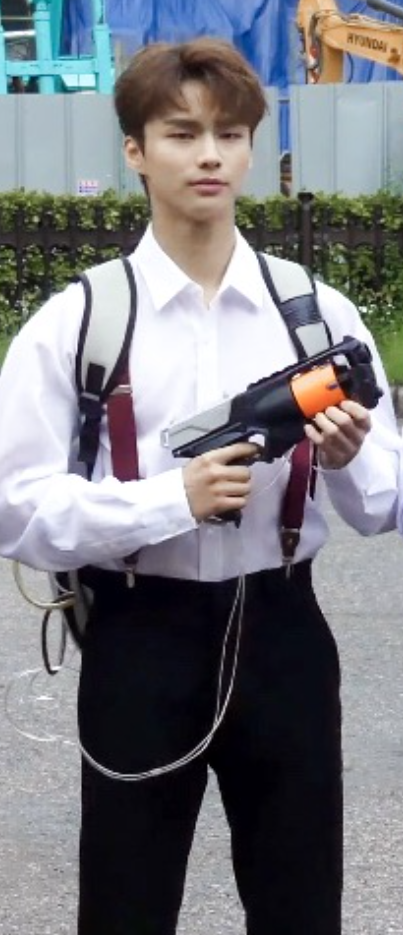
Kyoungyoon during his group debut in 2019

As a Dongyo trainee, Kyoungyoon was already part of group activities before his official debut. He officially debuted on April 24, 2019, as part of the 5-member boy group, Dongkiz. Although the group has no assigned positions, Kyoungyoon has been in charge of the vocals in the group.

During the release of their song Fever, Kyoungyoon was unable to join the group activities due to health problems. However, he later resumed group activities upon the release of their next single All I Need Is You the following year.

On December 30, 2021, "2021 (Memories)" was released where Kyoungyoon participated in writing the song. This was part of the group's end-of-the-year project single and would later become the last song of the group before the renaming.

On March 18, 2022, Kyoungyoon's label decided to rename their group DKZ and introduce line-up changes to form a 7-member boy group. In May 2022, Kyoungyoon (ranked 92nd) was included in the Top 100 K-Pop Boy Group Personal Brand Reputation Rankings for the said month which was released by the Korea Institute of Corporate Reputation. On May 26, 2022, he and Jaechan released an acoustic arrangement of their song "Cupid" (사랑도둑).

Dongyo Entertainment announced on April 19, 2023, that Kyoungyoon would take a leave from group activities for medical reasons. Subsequently, the agency announced on August 8 that Kyoungyoon would depart from the group and enlist in the military.

=== Solo activities ===
Kyoungyoon began his acting career in 2021. He was cast in the EBS internationally co-produced series Beasts of Asia, his first leading role on television.

The following year, Kyoungyoon started his career in musicals. In May 2022, Kyoungyoon was cast in the musical Equal alongside his fellow member Jonghyeong, which marked their debut as theater actors, and followed by the South Korean musical production of The Three Musketeers with his fellow member Mingyu as D'Artagnan.

After finishing his mandatory military service, Dongyo Entertainment announced that Kyoungyoon was cast as Father Francis in the rerun of the 2024 musical Happy Oh! Happy.

== Personal life ==
=== Military service ===
On September 12, 2023, Dongyo Entertainment announced that Kyoungyoon began his mandatory military service on September 11 as an active duty soldier in the Army. He was discharged from his military service on March 10, 2025.

== Discography ==
=== Music credits ===
All song credits are adapted from the Korea Music Copyright Association's database, unless otherwise noted.

Year	Artist	Song	Album	Lyrics		Arrangement	
Year	Artist	Song	Album	Credited	With	Credited	With
2020	Dongkiz	It's All Right	Non-album release	Yes	Jaechan, Munik, Wondae, Jonghyeong	No	—N/a
2021	Dongkiz	2021 (Memories)	Non-album release	Yes	Jaechan, Jonghyeong	No	—N/a
2022	DKZ	Cupid (사랑도둑) (Acoustic ver.)	"Chase Episode 2. Maum"	No	—N/a	Yes	Cray Bin, Jaechan
2022	DKZ	2022 (Forever)	"DKZ Year End Project Song 'It's All Right Part.3'"	Yes	Jaechan, Mingyu, Sehyeon, Jonghyeong, Giseok	No	—N/a

== Filmography ==
=== Television series ===
Year	Title	Role	Notes	Ref.
2019	Big Issue	Himself	Episode 3	
2019	Love With Flaws	Trainee with Joo Seo-joon		
2021	Beasts of Asia	Teo	Main role	
2022	Semantic Error	Waiter	Episode 5	

== Musicals ==
Year	Production		Role	Theater	Date	Notes	Ref.
Year	English title	Korean title	Role	Theater	Date	Notes	Ref.
2022	Equal	이퀄	Theo	Uniplex Hall 1 Grand Theater (South Korea); Hulic Hall Tokyo (Japan)	July 3–24, 2022 (South Korea Run); August 6–13, 2022 (Japan Run)	Main role (theatrical debut)	
2022	The Three Musketeers	삼총사	D'Artagnan	Universal Arts Center (Seoul); Aram Nuri Arts Center (Goyang); Sohyang Theater (Busan)	September 21–November 6, 2022 (Seoul); November 12, 2022 (Goyang); November 27, 2022 (Busan)		
2025	Happy Oh! Happy	해피 오! 해피	Father Francis	The Good Theater (Seoul)	August 20–November 9, 2025		

== Awards and nominations ==
Name of the award ceremony, year presented, award category, nominee(s) of the award, and the result of the nomination
Award	Year	Category	Nominee(s) / Work(s)	Result	Ref.
Seoul International Drama Awards	2022	Outstanding K-Pop Idol	Kyoungyoon	Nominated	
