= Park Seo-ham =

South Korean actor, singer and rapper (born 1993)

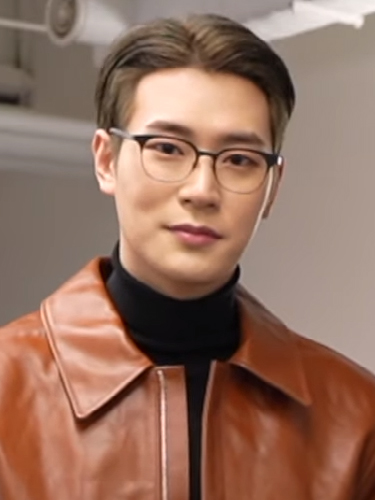
- Park in 2022
- Born: Park Gyeong-bok; October 28, 1993 (age 32); Jeongwang-dong, Siheung, South Korea
- Other name: Park Seung-jun
- Occupation: Actor
- Years active: 2016–present
- Agent: Npio Entertainment
- Height: 189 cm (6 ft 2 in)
- Musical career
- Genre: K-pop
- Instrument: Vocals
- Years active: 2016–2021
- Labels: YNB Entertainment; 220
- Formerly of: KNK

Korean name
- Hangul: 박경복
- RR: Bak Gyeongbok
- MR: Pak Kyŏngbok

Stage name
- Hangul: 박서함
- RR: Bak Seoham
- MR: Pak Sŏham
- Website: npioe.com/post/park-seo-ham

Park Gyeong-bok (Korean: 박경복; born October 28, 1993), known professionally as Park Seo-ham (박서함), is a South Korean actor, singer, and rapper. He is a former member of the South Korean boyband KNK. As an actor, he is best known for his role as Jang Jae-young in the web novel-adapted BL drama series Semantic Error.

== Career ==
=== Pre-debut ===
Along with fellow KNK member Inseong, he used to train under Big Hit Entertainment, now known as Big Hit Music where he trained with the members of the boy group BTS. When he moved to JYP Entertainment, he became an actor trainee after he won second place at the company's 10th Open Audition on February 19, 2013.

Before debuting with KNK, he was a backup dancer for the live performances of Bestie's "Zzang Christmas" as well as "I Need You".

=== 2016–2021: Debut with KNK and group departure ===
Park made his official debut as one of the five members of KNK on March 3, 2016, with the name Park Seung-jun (박승준). In 2018, he changed his name to Park Seo-ham. This is his third name following the change of Park Gyeong-bok to Park Seung-jun.

On September 30, 2021, it was announced that he has decided to leave KNK and 220 Entertainment after long discussions with the members regarding the future of his career.

=== 2022–present: Transitioning to acting, Semantic Error and Npio Entertainment ===
On January 12, 2022, Park confirmed as the lead actor in the live series adaption of Semantic Error, based from a popular South Korean BL web novel of the same name. He starred as Jang Jae-young, alongside DKZ member Park Jae-chan as his character's love interest Chu Sang-woo.

On March 7, 2022, Npio Entertainment announced they signed an exclusive contract with Park ahead of his military enlistment. In 2026, he co-starred in TvN's romantic-comedy Our Universe opposite Bae In-hyuk and Roh Jeong-eui.

== Personal life ==
=== Military service ===
On March 4, 2022, Sports Chosun released an interview with Park where they revealed that he would fulfill his mandatory military service as a social worker on March 10. Park completed his military service and was discharged on December 9, 2023.

== Filmography ==
=== Film ===
Year	Title	Role	Ref.
2022	Semantic Error: The Movie	Jang Jae-young	

=== Television series ===
Key
†	Denotes television productions that have not yet been released

Year	Title	Role	Notes	Ref.
2017	Children of the 20th Century	young Anthony		
2019	Dating Class	Yoon Soo		
2021	Dali & Cocky Prince	Himself (as KNK member)	Cameo (episode 7)	
2026	Our Universe	Park Yoon-seong		
2026	See You at Work Tomorrow!	Song Min-kyu	Special appearance	
2026	Dive into You	Jung Woo-jae		

=== Web series ===
Year	Title	Role	Ref.
2019	Just One Bite (Season 2)	Joo Woo-kyung	
2020	One Fine Week 2	Eden	
2022	Semantic Error	Jang Jae-young	
2025	The Murky Stream	Jung Cheon	

=== Television show ===
Year	Title	Notes	Ref.
2017	Idol Acting Competition	Cast member/contestant	
2017–2018	Mix Nine	Contestant	

== Discography ==
=== Soundtrack appearances ===
- Show Musical Dream High OST Part 6 ("My Valentine" with Lee Si-woo) (2025)

== Accolades ==
=== Awards and nominations ===
Name of the award ceremony, year presented, category, nominee of the award, and the result of the nomination
Award ceremony	Year	Category	Nominee / Work	Result	Ref.
APAN Star Awards	2022	Best New Actor	Semantic Error	Nominated	
APAN Star Awards	2022	Best Couple Award	Park Seo-ham (with Park Jae-chan); Semantic Error	Won	
APAN Star Awards	2023	Popularity Star Award (Actor)	Park Seo-ham	Nominated	
APAN Star Awards	2023	Global Star Award	Park Seo-ham	Nominated	
Blue Dragon Series Awards	2022	Best New Actor	Semantic Error	Nominated	
Blue Dragon Series Awards	2022	Popular Star Award	Park Seo-ham	Won	
Korea Best Brand Awards (Note: Hosted by The JoongAng and Forbes Korea, the Korea Best Brand Awards bases its winners on the best brands selected by the market and consumers.)	2023	Best Drama Actor/Artist	Semantic Error	Won	
Seoul International Drama Awards	2022	Outstanding Korean Actor	Semantic Error	Nominated	

=== Listicles ===
Name of publisher, year listed, name of listicle, and placement
Publisher	Year	Listicle	Placement	Ref.
Forbes	2022	Korea Power Celebrity 40 (Rising Star)	Placed	
