= Jonghyeong =

South Korean singer (born 2002)

Juone
- 주원
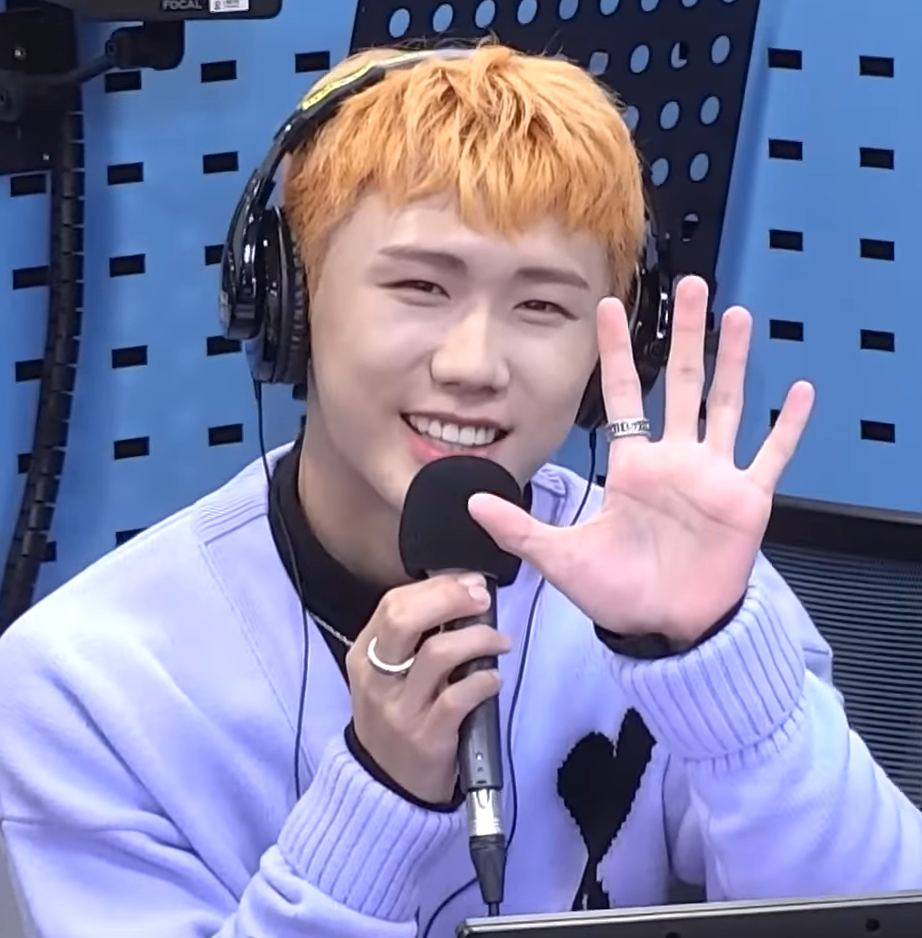
- Juone in April 2022
- Born: Kim Jong-hyeong; April 13, 2002 (age 24); Gumi, North Gyeongsang, South Korea
- Other name: Jonghyeong
- Education: Global Cyber University
- Occupations: Singer; actor
- Musical career
- Genre: K-pop
- Instrument: Vocals
- Years active: 2019–present
- Label: Dongyo Entertainment
- Formerly of: DKZ; NINE to SIX
- Website: dongyoent.com

Korean name
- Hangul: 김종형
- RR: Gim Jonghyeong
- MR: Kim Chonghyŏng

Kim Jong-hyeong (Korean: 김종형, born April 13, 2002), known professionally as Juone, is a South Korean singer and musical actor. He was the leader of the South Korean boy band DKZ and was a member of its sub-unit Nine to Six. He starred in musical productions such as Equal, Dracula, and The Secret Garden.

== Early life and education ==
Kim Jong-hyeong was born on April 13, 2002, in Gumi, North Gyeongsang, South Korea. Juone enjoyed watching music shows when he was young which inspired him to become an idol. Before debuting, he was leading a dance club at school and was even elected as the overall vice president during his elementary days. In 2022, he entered Global Cyber University as a Broadcasting and Entertainment major.

== Career ==
=== DKZ ===
Juone was the fourth member to join his current label and was a trainee for several months. He officially debuted on April 24, 2019, as the youngest member of the quintet boy group, Dongkiz. In an interview, Juone mentioned Dean and Monsta X as artists he look up to the most.

On March 18, 2022, his group rebranded and changed its name to DKZ. Juone took the role of the group's leader in the absence of their former leader and member, Wondae. In May 2022, he and fellow member, Jaechan, became fixed radio DJs at KBS Cool FM's Station Z.

On May 18, 2023, Dongyo Entertainment announced the formation of Nine to Six, a duo sub-unit consisting of Juone and Mingyu. They officially debuted on May 31, upon the release of their first single album Good To You.

In 2026, he changed his stage name from Jonghyeong to Juone. On April 15, 2026, Dongyo Entertainment announced that DKZ would disband. Beginning in June 2026, the members will pursue their individual projects. Juone and fellow member, Jaechan, were the only members who renewed their contracts with Dongyo. However on November 2, 2026 Dongyo announced they would be parting ways.

=== Solo activities ===
Juone started his career in musicals in 2022. He made his theatrical debut in the musical Equal alongside his fellow member Kyoungyoon. It was then followed by the Korean production of Dracula where he was cast as Dracula's friend, Dumitru.

In February 2023, Juone was announced to be part of the musical The Secret Garden. He also portrayed Polidori, an English writer and physician, in the 2023 South Korean musical Mary Shelley in December. On October 18, 2023, Juone performed for the Brandon Lee Symphony OST Concert with the Theater Philharmonic Orchestra at the Sejong Center for the Performing Arts.

On November 2, 2026 he officially announced his exit from the idol industry and as of now there is no update on his future plans.

== Discography ==
=== Music credits ===
Year	Artist	Song	Album	Lyrics	
Year	Artist	Song	Album	Credited	With
2020	Dongkiz	It's All Right	Non-album release	Yes	Jaechan, Kyoungyoon, Munik, Wondae
2021	Dongkiz	2021 (Memories)	Non-album release	Yes	Jaechan, Kyoungyoon
2022	DKZ	2022 (Forever)	"DKZ Year End Project Song 'It's All Right Part.3'"	Yes	Jaechan, Mingyu, Kyoungyoon, Sehyeon, Giseok

== Filmography ==
=== Television series ===
Year	Title	Role	Notes	Ref.
2019	Big Issue	Himself	Episode 3	
2019	Love with Flaws	Trainee with Joo Seo-joon		
2023	The Heavenly Idol	Nine to Six member	Episode 3	

=== Web series ===
Year	Title	Role	Notes	Ref.
2021	No Going Back Romance	Han Kyul's friend	Episode 4	
2022	Semantic Error	Customer	Episode 5	

== Musicals ==
Year	Production		Role	Theater	Date	Notes	Ref.
Year	English title	Korean title	Role	Theater	Date	Notes	Ref.
2022	Equal	이퀄	Nicola	Uniplex Hall 1 Grand Theater (South Korea); Hulic Hall Tokyo (Japan)	July 3–July 24, 2022 (South Korea Run); August 6–August 13, 2022 (Japan Run)	Main role (theatrical debut)	
2022	Dracula	드라큘라	Dumitru	Woori Financial Art Hall (Seoul); Sohyang Theatre (Busan); Keimyung Art Center (Daegu)	November 26, 2022 – January 7, 2023 (Seoul); February 10–11, 2023 (Busan); February 19, 2023 (Daegu)		
2023–2024	The Secret Garden	비밀의 화원	Beagle, Dickon Sowerby	National Jeongdong Theater (Seoul); National Theater of Korea (Seoul); Daegu Culture and Arts Center (Daegu)	March 10–April 30, 2023; August 1–September 22, 2024; October 4–5, 2024		
2023–2024	Mary Shelley	메리셸리	Polidori	Dongduk Women's University Performing Arts Center Cotton Hall (Seoul)	December 25, 2023–March 17, 2024		
2025	Love in the Rain	사랑은 비를 타고	Donghyun	Baekam Art Hall (Seoul)	April 29–July 13, 2025		

== Radio shows ==
Year	Title	Channel	Role	Notes	Ref.
2022	Station Z	KBS Cool FM	DJ	With Jaechan; May 4, 2022 – August 17, 2022	
2022	Pentagon Night Radio	EBS FM	Special DJ	September 12, 2022 – September 13, 2022	
2023–2024	Radio'n Us	Arirang Radio	Guest DJ	With Giseok; August 1, 2023 – January 30, 2024, November 5, 2024 – present	
