= My YouTube Diary =

2019 South Korean web series

- Promotional poster of S2
- Hangul: 조아서 구독중
- RR: Joaseo gudokjung
- MR: Choasŏ kudokchung
- Genre: Drama
- Based on: YouTube
- Starring: Park Jae-chan; Kim Ri-won
- Country of origin: South Korea
- Original language: Korean
- No. of seasons: 3
- No. of episodes: 29

Production
- Running time: 11–18 minutes
- Production companies: CJ ENM; IN Culture & Contents (Inster Contents Group); Black Yak corporation; Sandbox Network Inc.

Original release
- Network: Tooniverse; YouTube
- Release: August 9, 2019 – December 11, 2020

My YouTube Diary (Korean: 조아서 구독중) is a South Korean web series. It aired on cable network Tooniverse and YouTube channel at 5:00 and 8:00 every Friday on August 9 to November 15, 2019, in the first season. A sequel titled My Mukbang Diary (조아서 먹방중) was premiered on August 7 to September 25, 2020. The second season aired from October 23 to December 11, 2020.

== Cast ==
=== Season 1 ===
- Park Jae-chan as Kang Heon / "Sweet Honey"
- Kim Ri-won
- Jo Ah-seo as Yun Hyerim
- Kim Ri-won as Kim Ri-a
- Jang Munik as Seo Joon
- Ddotty

=== My Mukbang Diary ===
- Lucky Kang-yi
- Miki Gwang-soo (미키광수)
- Mingggo Balral
- Yoon Jjoo-goo (윤쭈꾸)
- Cha Soo-min

=== Season 2 ===
- Sim Hyun-seo as Cha Seon-yool
- Park Sang-hoon as Moon Do-jin
- Wooyeon as Sha Sha

=== Cameo ===
- Park Ji-ye as Koo Ha-ri
- Jung Sung-young as Kim Hyun-woo
