= 1st Blue Dragon Series Awards =

2022 South Korean television awards ceremony

- Official poster
- Awarded for: Excellence in OTT television
- Date: July 19, 2022
- Site: Paradise City, Incheon
- Hosted by: Jun Hyun-moo; Lim Yoona
- Organised by: Sports Chosun
- Most wins: D.P. (2); Squid Game (2)
- Most nominations: Squid Game (5); D.P. (4); SNL Korea (4)
- Website: bsa.blueaward.co.kr/series/

Television/radio coverage
- Network: LG Uplus; Naver Now

The 1st Blue Dragon Series Awards (Korean: 제1회 청룡 시리즈 어워즈) ceremony, organised by Sports Chosun was held on July 19, 2022, at Paradise City, Incheon, beginning at 7:00 p.m. KST. The event is the first award ceremony targeting streaming series contents in South Korea. It was hosted by Jun Hyun-moo and Lim Yoona and was broadcast live through LG Uplus and Naver Now. while the red carpet event was hosted by Jaejae.

The nominees were announced on July 6, 2022. The series which were produced, invested by OTT platforms and released from May 1, 2021, to April 30, 2022, were eligible for nominations. The jury of the Blue Dragon Series Awards is made up of six verified experts. To reduce the gap between experts and general viewers, netizens votes were also reflected as one judge, and the winner (work) was selected as a result of a total of those 7 votes.

Squid Game received the highest number of nominations of five. D.P. and Squid Game became the most winning programs winning two awards each.

== Winners and nominees ==
- Winners are listed first and emphasized in **bold**.

**Best Drama**	**Best Entertainment Program**
**D.P.**; Through the Darkness; Squid Game; Yumi's Cells; Political Fever	**EXchange**; SNL Korea; Seoul Check-in; Girls' High School Mystery Class; Play You
**Best Actor**	**Best Actress**
**Lee Jung-jae – Squid Game**; Jung Hae-in – D.P.; Lee Je-hoon – Move to Heaven; Kim Nam-gil – Through the Darkness; Im Si-wan – Tracer	**Kim Go-eun – Yumi's Cells**; Kim Hye-soo – Juvenile Justice; Oh Yeon-seo – Mad for Each Other; Kim Sung-ryung – Political Fever; Han Hyo-joo – Happiness
**Best Male Entertainer**	**Best Female Entertainer**
**Kang Ho-dong – New Journey to the West Special Spring Camp**; Shin Dong-yup – SNL Korea; Baek Jong-won – Baek Jong-won's Four Seasons; Yoo Jae-seok – Play You; Lee Yong-jin – EXchange	**Celeb Five (Song Eun-i, Ahn Young-mi, Shin Bong-sun, Kim Shin-young) – Celeb Five : Behind the Curtain**; Lee Hyori – Seoul Check-in; Jang Do-yeon – Girls' High School Mystery Class; Jaejae – Girls' High School Mystery Class; Yura – EXchange
**Best Supporting Actor**	**Best Supporting Actress**
**Lee Hak-joo – Political Fever**; Son Suk-ku – D.P.; Ahn Bo-hyun – My Name; Yang Kyung-won – One Ordinary Day; Park Hae-soo – Squid Game	**Kim Shin-rok – Hellbound**; Lee Jung-eun – Juvenile Justice; Keum Sae-rok – Youth of May; Kim Joo-ryoung – Squid Game; Bae Hae-sun – Happiness
**Best New Actor**	**Best New Actress**
**Koo Kyo-hwan – D.P.**; Kang Daniel – Rookie Cops; Chang Ryul – My Name; Park Seo-ham & Park Jae-chan – Semantic Error; Lee Do-hyun – Youth of May	**HoYeon Jung – Squid Game**; Han So-hee – My Name; Won Ji-an – Hope or Dope; Park Ji-hu – All of Us Are Dead; Cho Yi-hyun – All of Us Are Dead
**Best New Male Entertainer**	**Best New Female Entertainer**
**Kai – New World**; Jeong Hyuk – SNL Korea; Hanhae – Single's Inferno; Jung Chan-sung – Fighter Club; Lee Seung-yuop – Golf Battle: Birdie Buddies	**Joo Hyun-young – SNL Korea**; Lee Mi-joo – Learn Way; Lee Da-hee – Single's Inferno; Bibi – Girls' High School Mystery Class; Choi Ye-na – Girls' High School Mystery Class
**Popular Star Awards**
**Jung Hae-in**; **Han Hyo-joo**; **Kang Daniel**; **Lee Yong-jin**; **Park Jae-chan**; **Park Seo-ham**

=== Television programs with multiple wins ===
The following television programs received multiple wins:

Wins	Television programs
2	D.P.
2	Squid Game

=== Television programs with multiple nominations ===
The following television programs received multiple nominations:

Nominations	Television programs
5	Squid Game
4	D.P.
4	SNL Korea
3	Girls' High School Mystery Class
3	My Name
3	Political Fever
2	Happiness
2	Juvenile Justice
2	Play you
2	Seoul Check-in
2	Single's Inferno
2	Through the Darkness
2	EXchange
2	Youth of May
2	Yumi's Cells

== Presenters and performers ==
The following individuals, listed in order of appearance, presented awards or performed musical numbers.

=== Presenters ===
Presenter(s)	Award(s)	Ref.
Kim Young-dae and Roh Jeong-eui	Best New Male Entertainer and Best New Female Entertainer	
Hwang Min-hyun	Best New Actor and Best New Actress	
Park Hyung-sik and Kim Seol-hyun	Best Supporting Actor and Best Supporting Actress	
Lee Hye-ri and Key	Best Male Entertainer and Best Female Entertainer	
Moon So-ri and Lee Se-young	Best Actor and Best Actress	
Kang Ho-dong	Best Entertainment Program	
Jang Dong-gun	Best Drama	

=== Performers ===
Name(s)	Role	Performed	Ref.
Gummy	Performers	"Remember Me" (기억해줘요 내 모든 날과 그때를) (Hotel del Luna OST)	
Hynn	Performers	"The Lonely Bloom Stands Alone" (시든 꽃에 물을 주듯)	
