= Kim Min-seo (actress, born 2009) =

South Korean actress (born 2009)

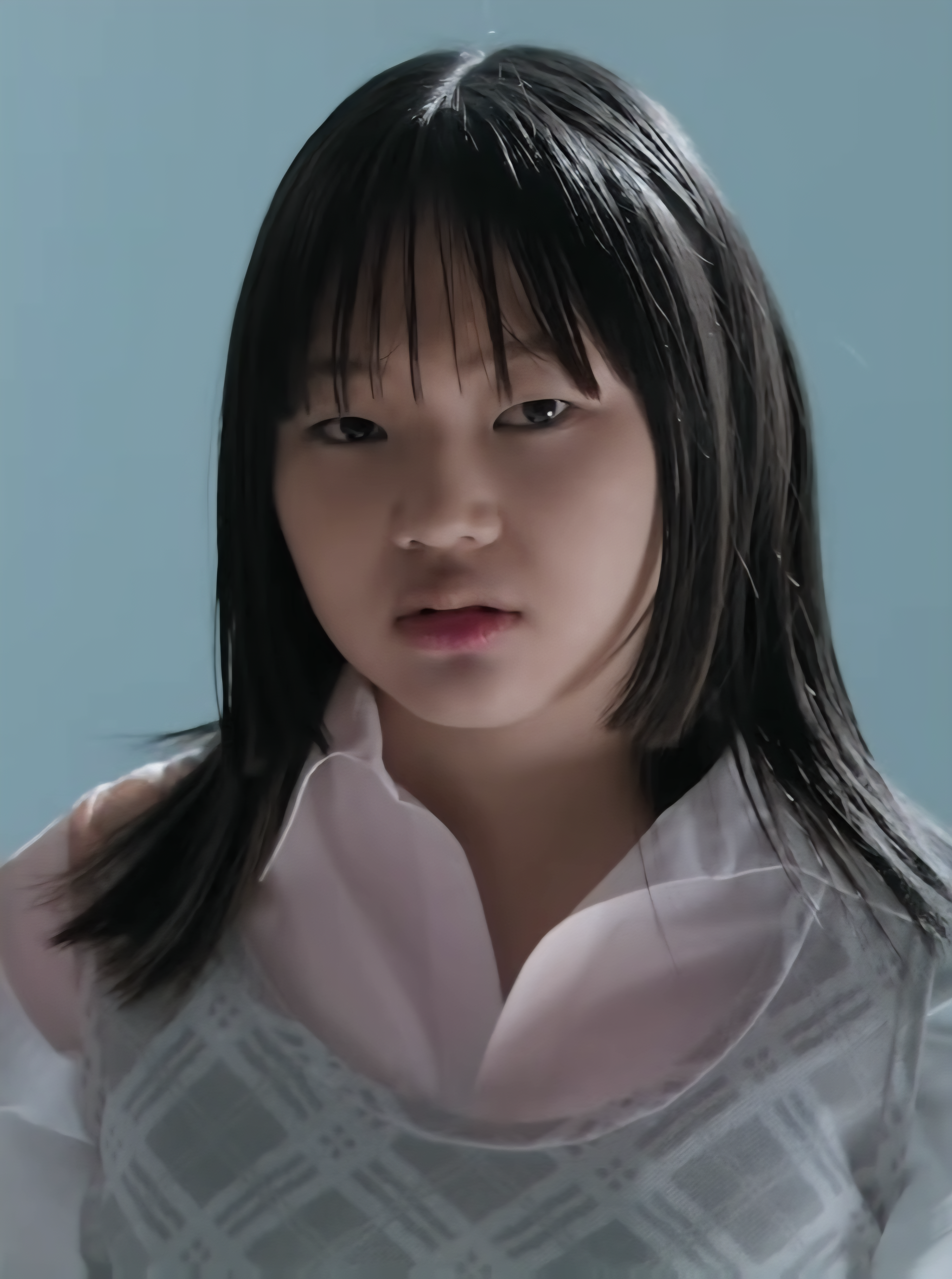
- Kim for Marie Claire Korea in March 2024
- Born: April 18, 2009 (age 17); Seoul, South Korea
- Occupation: Actress
- Years active: 2017–present
- Notable work: Hometown Cha-Cha-Cha; The First Responders
- Awards: Best Young Actress 2022 SBS Drama Awards

Korean name
- Hangul: 김민서
- Hanja: 金旼序
- RR: Gim Minseo
- MR: Kim Minsŏ
- IPA: kim min sʰʌ̹

Kim Min-seo (Korean: 김민서; pronounced [kim min sʰʌ̹]; born April 18, 2009) is a South Korean teenage actress and model. Kim is known for her roles in the drama series Hometown Cha-Cha-Cha (2021) and family drama Young Lady and Gentleman (2021), as well as her appearance in the first season of SBS drama The First Responders, where she garnered Best Young Actress Award at the 2022 SBS Drama Awards.

In addition to her acting career, Kim is actively involved as a model in various advertisements. She has also gained recognition as one of the cast members of ODG, a South Korean kids' YouTube Channel.

== Career ==
Kim began her career as a child fashion model in commercials. At the age of 8, she joined an acting academy and made her debut in a minor role in the short film Polaroid (2017). On August 26, 2017, she successfully auditioned for a short film produced by JTBC All Spectators. She was cast as Min-ju in the short film Spiderman (2017), directed by award-winning director Park Kwang-hyun.

In 2019, Kim landed her next role in the independent film Maggie, by director Lee Ok-seop and screenwriter Koo Kyo-hwan. She portrayed the young version of Moon So-ri's character, Lee Kyeong-jin. She also appeared in her first commercial film, a historical comedy titled Jesters: The Game Changers, directed by Kim Joo-Ho. In the same year, Kim also joined as cast member of ODG, a children South Korean YouTube Channel by Studio Solfa.

In 2019, Kim started auditioning for television roles and secured a minor role in the OCN drama Save Me 2 (2019). In 2020, she appeared in minor roles in three dramas, Hospital Playlist (2020), My Bright Life (2020) and Delayed Justice (2020). ODG supported her career with content titled "Kid Actress to Her Career," which showcased Kim's reflections on her journey as a child actress. On April 2, 2021, the channel released a video titled "Kid tries not to recognize her favorite K-pop star," featuring Kim and her favorite K-pop singer and actress, IU. Kim re-enacted a scene performed by IU in the drama My Mister and explained to IU how it helped her career as an actress.

"Min-seo is like an acting genius. The first time I saw her (acting), I was amazed. Where does that confidence come from at such a young age? In fact, being among adults is scary. Would I have had as much confidence and sense as Minseo at that age?"

— Kim Seon-ho on Kim Min-seo as Oh Ju-ri in Hometown Cha-cha-cha.

Kim's first major supporting role on television was in the 2021 tvN drama series Hometown Cha-Cha-Cha. She portrayed Oh Ju-ri, a fourteen-year-old girl and the only daughter of widower Oh Chun-jae, a cafe owner in Gongjin. Her character's passion for the fictional idol group DOS in the drama allowed Kim to showcase her singing and acting. Due to the popularity of her role as Oh Ju-ri, Kim was appointed as the public relations ambassador for the 2nd Gimpo Youth Film Festival for three years. She was also invited to host of The 11th Gaon Chart Music Awards alongside actor Jo Han-chul, who played her father in the drama.

That same year, Kim appeared in the KBS2 weekend family drama Young Lady and Gentleman opposite Ji Hyun-woo. In this drama, she portrayed the younger version of Park Dan-dan, with Lee Se-hee playing the character as an adult. Kim also acted opposite Kim Kang-woo as his daughter in the omnibus feature film New Year Blues.

In 2022, Kim made notable appearances on television. In KBS2 miniseries Café Minamdang, Kim portrayed the young version of Han Jae-hui, a role later played by Oh Yeon-seo as adult. Later, Kim landed her first lead role as archer Eun-ho in the Korean adaptation of Fair Training, which was part of EBS Omnibus Drama Beast of Asia Season 2. Furthermore, Kim showcased her acting skills in the KT Genie drama series Never Give Up (TV series), where she portrayed Kim Ji-hyun, involved in a love triangle with characters played by Jeong Dong-won and Kim Ji-young. The drama gained significant attention after its airing on cable channel ENA and became popular on Netflix Korea. Moreover, Kim appeared in the second episode of the first season of the SBS drama series The First Responders as middle school student Kim Hyeon-seo. Her performances earned her the title of Best Young Actress at 2022 SBS Drama Awards.

== Filmography ==
=== Short film ===
List of short film performances
Year	Title		Role	Notes	Ref.
Year	English	Korean	Role	Notes	Ref.
2017	Spiderman	거미맨	Lee Cheong-ah (young)	Part of JTBC All Spectators Program	
2019	Sick	병 (病)	Mi Young		
2020	Satellite Kids Blues	신도시 키드	Ji-hye		

=== Feature film ===
List of feature film performances
Year	Title		Role	Notes	Ref.
Year	English	Korean	Role	Notes	Ref.
2019	Maggie	메기	Lee Kyeong-jin	Young version, adult was acted by Moon So-ri	
2019	Jesters: The Game Changers	광대들: 풍문조작단	Clown, The Windmills		
2020	Baseball Girl	야구소녀	Joo Soo-in's class	independent film	
2020	The Swordsman (2020 film)	검객	the girl in front of the inn		
2021	New Year Blues	새해전야	Jiho's daughter		
2021	Waiting for Rain	비와 당신의 이야기	Student who did math		
2023	Alienoid	외계+인 1부			

=== Television series ===
List of television series performances
Year	Title		Role	Notes	Ref.
Year	English	Korean	Role	Notes	Ref.
2019	Save Me 2	구해줘 2	Kim Young-sun	Young Version; Ep. 1,4-5	
2020	Hospital Playlist	슬기로운 의사생활	Tae-hee	Patient role; Ep.9	
2020	My Bright Life	찬란한_내_인생	Im Se-ra		
2020	Delayed Justice	날아라 개천용	Jung Myung-hee		
2021	Hometown Cha-Cha-Cha	갯마을 차차차	Oh Ju-ri		
2021–2022	Young Lady and Gentleman	신사와 아가씨	Park Dan-dan	Young Version	
2022	Café Minamdang	미남당	Han Jae-hee	Young Version	
2022	Beasts of Asia 2	비스트 오브 아시아 2	Eun-ho		
2022	Never Give Up	구필수는 없다	Kim Ji-hyun		
2022	The First Responders	소방서 옆 경찰서	Kim Hyeon-seo	Cameo (ep 2)	

=== Web series ===
Year	Title		Role	Notes	Ref.
Year	English	Korean	Role	Notes	Ref.
2023	Mask Girl	마스크걸	Kim Ye-chun	Netflix Original Series	
2023	Cold Blooded Intern	잔혹한 인턴	Gong Lee-young		
2023	Song of the Bandits	도적: 칼의 소리	a Woman in the Past (played by Lee Ho-jung)"		

=== Web show ===
Year	Title	Role	Note	Ref.
2019–2021	ODG	Cast Member	YouTube (Studio Solfa)	

== Ambassadorship ==
- 2021–2024: Public relations ambassador for the 2nd Gimpo Youth Film Festival
- 2023: Public Relations Ambassador Gyeonggi Office of Education

== Awards and nominations ==
Award received by Kim Min-seo
Award ceremony	Year	Category	Nominee / Work	Result	Ref.
SBS Drama Awards	2022	Best Young Actress	The First Responders	Won	
