= Equal (musical) =

- Music: Woody Pak
- Lyrics: Soovin Kim
- Book: Soovin Kim
- Basis: Equal by Kenichi Suemitsu
- Productions: 2021 Seoul 2022 Seoul 2022 Tokyo

Equal (Korean: 이퀄) is a two-hander South Korean musical based on the Japanese stage play of the same name by Kenichi Suemitsu. The musical's book and lyrics are by Soovin Kim, with music by Woody Pak.

The musical is set in 17th century Europe, during the Black Death pandemic. The story takes place over a week and follows the attempts of Theo, a country doctor, to find a cure for the mysterious illness that is killing his best friend Nicola.

Equal held its first theatrical run from December 31, 2021 to February 20, 2022 at Uniplex Hall 1 in Seoul, South Korea. A second Seoul production ran from June 3, 2022 to July 24, 2022, also at Uniplex Hall 1. A number of the 2022 Seoul cast reprised their roles in Equal's first Japanese production, which ran from August 4, 2022 to August 14, 2022 at Tokyo's Hulic Hall.

== Plot ==
In 1665, while witch hunts and the Black Death ravage the European countryside, childhood friends Theo and Nicola live together in a small cabin.

=== Monday ===
Theo returns home from his shift at the local hospital with pastries for a grateful Nicola, whose mysterious illness prevents him from leaving the house (“‘Cause I Know You”). After Nicola collapses in a coughing fit, Theo leads him back to bed, where he finds Nicola’s locked diary. He teases him about it before being struck with a migraine of his own.

=== Tuesday ===
Nicola writes about Theo in his diary, hoping they’ll be together forever, but worried over Theo’s worsening migraines (“You’re Perfect”). Theo interrupts with a letter from Audette, a mutual childhood friend who Theo believes to be in love with Nicola, and he and Nicola reminisce about their time together as children (“Audette’s Letter"). To comfort a now melancholy Theo, Nicola suggests they reenact a ritual the three friends once attempted in order to save the life of a drowned kitten. He reveals that he still has the magic stone they used for the spell, though Theo has forgotten both the stone and the ritual (“Our Magic Spell”).

=== Wednesday ===
Theo arrives home with an antique book, claiming that he has found the cure to Nicola’s illness: using alchemy, he will transform Nicola into a ‘golden human’ who can live forever (“Golden Human”). Nicola is unconvinced, but Theo is too excited to listen to his objections. He eventually reveals the true reason for his excitement: he’s fallen in love with Marietta, a woman who works at the bakery, and intends to marry her after Nicola is cured. He urges Nicola to write a letter to Audette and confess to her, so that they can both be married and find happiness (“Say How You Feel”). After Theo leaves to meet Marietta again, a heartbroken Nicola pulls out a set of vials and mixes two potions, one red and one black. He contemplates both potions while writing in his diary (“You’re Perfect - Reprise”).

=== Thursday ===
When Theo returns from work, he finds the house empty. Nicola eventually stumbles through the door with burn marks on his neck from the sun, holding a bag with a headless blackbird inside. Increasingly volatile, Nicola accuses Theo of forgetting to bring him food because of his obsession with Marietta, saying that he killed the blackbird to feed himself and that he doesn’t need Theo anymore (“Little Black Bird”). Horrified, Theo slaps Nicola and the two argue before Theo storms out again. Both muse separately on the Biblical stories of creation and the flood, wondering whether God destroyed and then remade his creations out of loneliness or fear of abandonment (“Why Did God”).

=== Friday ===
Theo comes home drunk to find a weeping Nicola sitting on the bed. Nicola explains what he overheard at the window: Marietta is dead, murdered by religious zealots who found evidence of witchcraft in her room. As another migraine mounts, Theo accuses Nicola of planting the blackbird in Marietta’s room to have her killed, then forces Nicola to reenact their childhood resurrection ritual to try and revive her (“Theo’s Breakdown”). Nicola escapes from Theo's grasp when Theo’s migraine becomes a full blown mental break and he begins seizing. He cuts his hand with a knife and feeds Theo the blood. Theo collapses before reawakening with no memory of the last day, even forgetting his own name briefly. Nicola sends him to bed, then writes in his diary that Theo may be another ‘failure’ that needs to be disposed of.

=== Saturday ===
Theo returns from work with another letter from Audette. He gives the letter to Nicola, who reads that Audette wishes she could come visit Theo, and wonders if flowers still bloom over Nicola’s grave ("Audette's Letter - Reprise"). Theo pulls out a grave marker that he retrieved from the forest with Nicola’s name engraved and asks who he is, since his friend Nicola is clearly dead. Nicola at last admits that he is not Nicola, but the real Theo: ‘Theo’ is actually the resurrected body of Nicola, who after many months of failed experiments he has managed to recreate using alchemy, though the side effects of the experiment caused his own body to sicken. He also explains that he has been using his red potions to erase Theo's memory, and his black potions to dispose of past experiments. Theo refuses to believe him and reveals a sack of letters, supposedly hand-delivered by a now 70-year-old Audette and her granddaughter to the hospital that morning. He insists that whatever experiment has been going on, its origin predates Nicola’s explanation (“Lies of Lies of Lies”). The two conclude that there is no way to tell which is the real human and which is the experiment, so they agree to drink Nicola’s black potion at the same time. The scene ends with the sound of shattering glass.

=== Sunday ===
Theo comes home for the final time to find Nicola writing at his desk. After hanging his coat, he explains that his mind is starting to feel clearer, and asks Nicola why he knocked the potion from Theo’s hand before he could drink. Nicola explains that he didn’t want to lose Theo again. He doesn’t care who is who, so long as they have each other. Theo agrees and recounts a dream he had that night about his birth (“The Dream”). He tells Nicola that he still doesn’t know how long it will take before he’ll be able to find a cure but asks if Nicola wants to go on a trip together anyways, to visit a lake they loved in childhood. Nicola says yes, and they walk out of the house hand in hand (“‘Cause I Know You - Reprise").

== Songs ==
- "'Cause I Know You" – Theo, Nicola
- "You're Perfect" – Nicola
- "Audette's Letter" – Theo, Nicola
- "Our Magic Spell" – Theo, Nicola
- "Golden Human" – Theo, Nicola
- "Say What You Feel" – Theo
- "You're Perfect - Reprise" – Nicola
- "Little Black Bird" – Nicola
- "Why Did God" – Theo, Nicola
- "Theo's Breakdown" – Theo
- "Audette's Letter - Reprise" – Nicola
- "Lies of Lies of Lies" – Theo, Nicola
- "The Dream" – Theo, Nicola
- "'Cause I Know You - Reprise" – Theo, Nicola

== Casts ==
Role	Seoul (2021)	Seoul (2022)	Tokyo (2022)
Theo	Jun. K, Baekho, Kim Kyungrok	Wonho, Lee Hyunseok, Kang Seung-sik, Kyoungyoon, Kim Kyungrok	Wonho, Kang Seung-sik, Kyoungyoon
Nicola	Joochan, Jung Jaehwan	Joochan, Lim Se-jun, Jonghyeong, Shin Hyuksoo	Lim Se-jun, Jonghyeong, Kim Kyungrok
