= DKZ =

South Korean boy band (2019–2026)

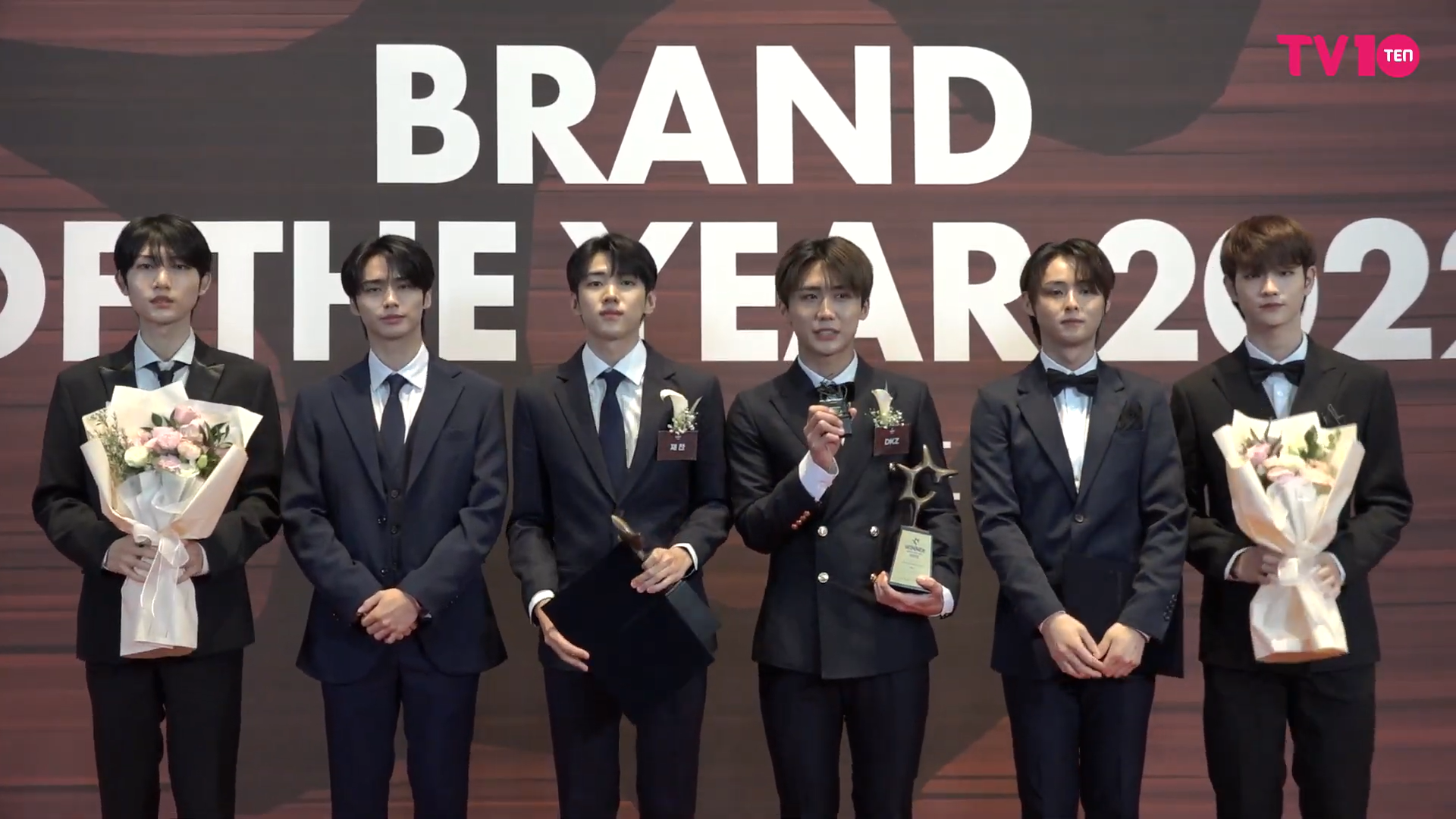
- DKZ in September 2022; From L–R: Sehyeon, Kyoungyoon, Jaechan, Juone, Mingyu, and Giseok.

Background information
- Origin: Seoul, South Korea
- Genre: K-pop
- Years active: 2019–2026
- Label: Dongyo
- Spinoffs: Dongkiz I:Kan; Nine to Six
- Past members: Sehyeon; Mingyu; Jaechan; Juone; Giseok; Wondae; Munik; Kyoungyoon
- Website: dongyoent.com/dkz.php

DKZ (Korean: 디케이지; formerly Dongkiz; 동키즈, stylized in all caps) was a South Korean boy band formed and managed by Dongyo Entertainment. The group consists of five members: Sehyeon, Mingyu, Jaechan, Juone, and Giseok. Wondae, Munik, and Kyoungyoon, left the group in March 2022, February and August 2023, respectively. They debuted on April 24, 2019, with the single album Dongkiz on the Block, and concluded their activities on May 31, 2026.

== History ==
=== 2018: Predebut ===
The members of Dongkiz—Wondae, Kyoungyoon, Munik, Jaechan, and Juone—were trainees between one and three years. The group was modeled after New Kids on the Block.

Dongkiz initiated promotional activities in August 2018, which included uploading dance covers onto Dongyo Entertainment's YouTube channel and busking. They also performed at the HEC Korea Concert in Thailand and attended the 2018 Joox Thailand Music Awards.

On November 21, 2018, the group released a Minneapolis sound-based pre-debut single entitled "Nom".

=== 2019–2021: Career beginnings ===
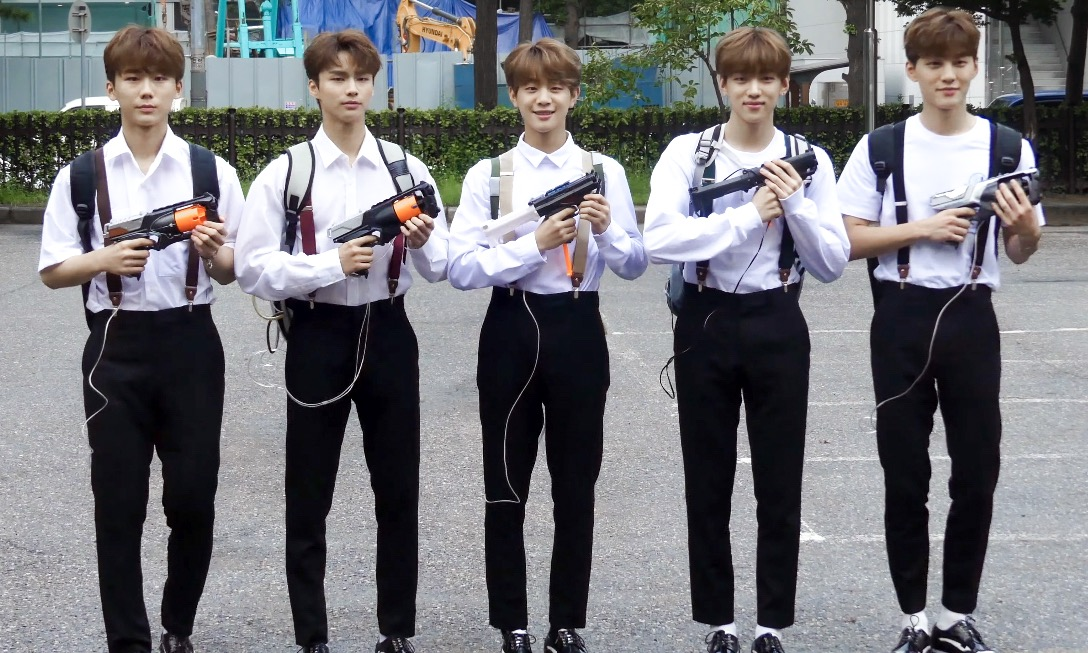
The group as DONGKIZ in August 2019.

Originally slated for a February 2019 debut, Dongkiz released their debut single album Dongkiz on the Block on April 24. They intended to promote a different song, but ultimately decided on "Nom" to serve as the lead single. On July 22, the group released their second single album BlockBuster. The title track samples the theme song of the 1984 film Ghostbusters. Dedicated to their fans, they released the dance-pop track "Dreaming You" as a digital single on September 11. After sustaining a leg injury in midst of practice, in addition to ongoing trauma from a back injury endured prior to his debut, Kyoungyoon paused his activities to recuperate and the group continued promoting as four. Dongkiz released their first mini-album Dongky Town and accompanying disco-EDM single "Fever" on November 6. They went on to win the "Focus Award (Music)" at the 2019 Asia Artist Awards held at Mỹ Đình National Stadium in Hanoi, Vietnam. The group was also invited to perform by the Korean Cultural Center in Turkey on December that year.

On January 2, 2020, Dongkiz followed up with the funk single "All I Need Is You", marking Kyoungyoon's return to the group. The group released the old-school hip hop-dance single "Lupin" on March 15. Dongkiz's third single album Ego was released on August 19, 2020. On December 30, the group released "It's All Right" on their official social networking sites. The song was their first year-end project song which was written, composed, and arranged by all five members of the group.

Dongkiz's fourth single album Youniverse was released on April 15, 2021. It was then followed by the release of their fifth single album Chase Episode 1. Ggum with "Crazy Night" as its single on July 1. In August that year, Dongkiz was again invited for a K-pop concert in Ankara, Turkey hosted by the Korean Cultural Center, and Dongyo Entertainment announced that Wondae and Munik will be taking hiatus from group activities. On December 30, 2021, Kyoungyoon, Jaechan, and Juone released their second year-end project song, "2021 (Memories)".

=== 2022: Rebranding and rising popularity ===
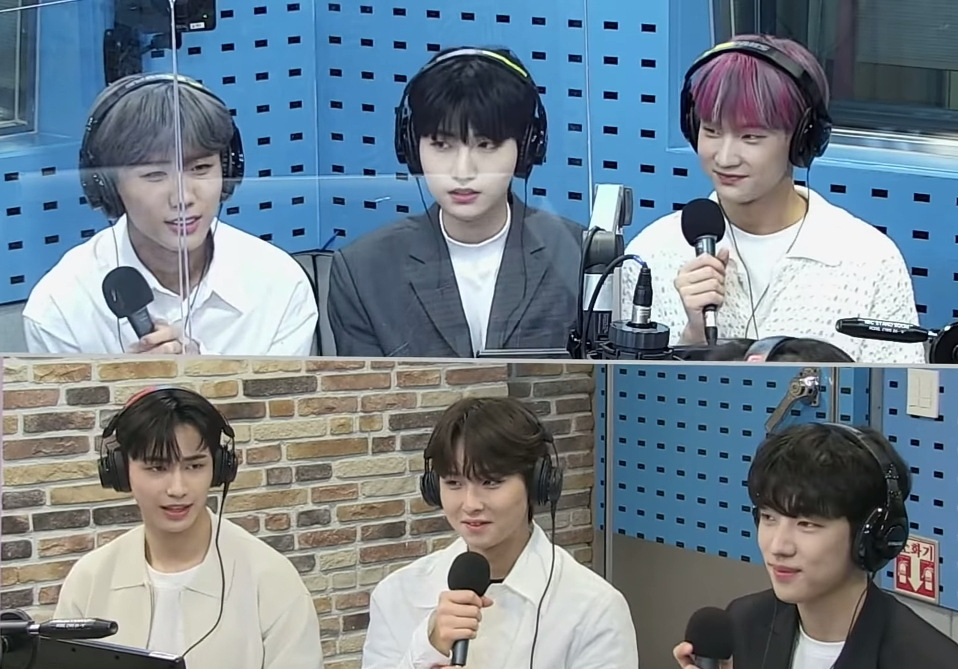
DKZ in April 2022.

On March 18, Dongyo Entertainment announced Wondae's departure from the group due to ongoing health issues while Munik will remain with the group but stay on indefinite hiatus due to medical issues. The agency also revealed its plans to rebrand Dongkiz by changing its name to DKZ and adding three new members to its lineup. On March 28, Sehyeon, Mingyu, and Giseok were introduced as new members of the group. The group released their sixth single album Chase Episode 2. Maum with "Cupid" as its single on April 12. A limited-edition acoustic version of the same album was released on May 26, which was sold out minutes after the server was restored when it initially crashed during release.

The group attended and performed at the K-Expo 2022 in Sao Paulo, Brazil. Hosted by the Korean Cultural Center in Brazil, DKZ was the only K-pop idol group invited to perform at the country's largest Hallyu cultural festival held on July 9 and 10.

On September 2, they were recognized and given the "Male Idol - Rising Star Award" in the 2022 Brand of the Year Awards organized by the Korea Consumer Forum.

On October 6, the group released their seventh single album and the last one for their Chase Album Trilogy - Chase Episode 3. Beum with "Uh-Heung" as its single. While they were promoting for their comeback, DKZ performed in the Ariake Arena in Tokyo, Japan, on October 15 for KCON 2022 as the first gen winner of MNET Plus' Road to Max: Road to KCON. On October 18, DKZ gained their first music show award during promotions for "Uh-Heung" on the SBS M's The Show.

In November, DKZ performed at the 2022 Genie Music Awards and was chosen to be the recipient of the "Next Generation Award". Prior to that, the group was announced as the honorary winner of the final episode of MNET Plus' Road to Max: Road to MAMA Awards. As its winning prize, on November 29, the group attended and performed at the 2022 MAMA Awards held at the Kyocera Dome in Osaka, Japan.

Before the year 2022 ended, the group released their self-produced digital album, DKZ Year End Project Song 'It's All Right Part.3' with their single "2022 (Forever)" on December 30.

=== 2023: First fan-con and members' departure ===
The group held its first live fan concert since their debut Welcome to DTU (Dongky Town University) on January 14 and 15, 2023 in SK Olympic Handball Gymnasium. The 2-day concert was also simultaneously broadcast live for a fee through an online platform.

On February 28, Dongyo Entertainment announced the departure of Munik from the group. In addition, on April 19, it was announced that Kyoungyoon would temporarily suspend his activities with the group for medical issues. On August 7, the agency announced the departure of Kyoungyoon from the group and his military enlistment.

In December, the group released two digital singles. "Daymoon" was released on December 5 and "2023 (Friends)" on December 30.

=== 2024–2026: Subsequent releases and disbandment ===
In March 2024, Dongyo Entertainment announced that DKZ will release their second mini album Reboot, early in April, coinciding with their fifth anniversary in the industry. DKZ officially returned as a complete five-member group following a lineup reshuffle on April 12. The group held its showcase at Ilchi Art Hall in Seoul, where DKZ presented its lead single, "Like A Movie". Immediately after its release, the EP topped the iTunes Top Album Chart in Taiwan and reached the top ten in Thailand and Hong Kong. On October 13, the group was invited to perform at the KDF Concert during the 2024 Korea Drama Festival, where Jaechan won an award at the main event held earlier. Before 2024 ended, DKZ was honored with the "K-pop Singer Award" at the 32nd Korea Culture and Entertainment Awards held on December 10.

On October 31, 2025, DKZ released their third mini album Tasty. The EP consists of six songs with "Replay My Anthem" as its title track.

In 2026, the group held its second fan concert The Dinner at the ECC Samsung Hall of Ewha Womans University in Seoul on April 11-12, followed by a performance in Taipei, Taiwan, on May 30. On April 15, Dongyo Entertainment announced that DKZ would disband. After discussions between the agency and the members, it was decided that the group will conclude all activities on May 31. Starting in June 2026, the members will pursue individual projects. Jaechan and Juone have renewed their contracts with Dongyo, while Sehyeon, Mingyu, and Giseok will also remain with the agency as individual artists.

== Members ==
- Sehyeon (세현)
- Mingyu (민규)
- Jaechan (재찬) – vocals, rap
- Juone (종형) – leader, vocals
- Giseok (기석)
- Wondae (원대) – leader, vocals, rap
- Munik (문익) – vocals
- Kyoungyoon (경윤) – vocals

== Sub-units ==
=== Dongkiz I:Kan ===
On July 7, 2020, members Munik and Jaechan formed the group's first sub-unit called Dongkiz I:Kan (Korean: 동키즈 아이캔; or simply I:Kan, stylized in all caps). They debuted upon the release of a new jack swing single "Y.O.U". On February 28, 2023, Munik departed the group, thus the disbandment of the duo sub-unit.

=== Nine to Six ===
On May 18, 2023, Dongyo Entertainment announced the creation of a sub-unit called Nine to Six (Korean: 나인투식스), which name derives from the members' role in the TvN drama, The Heavenly Idol. The unit consists of two members, Juone and Mingyu. The duo officially debuted and released their first single album Good To You on May 31, which contains a total of three songs including "Don't Call Me", "Nod" and "Digital Love".

== Ambassadorship and philanthropy ==
During their pre-debut, the group performed at the Charity Concert for Palu, Sigi, and Donggala held in Jakarta, Indonesia. The proceeds of the charity performance were donated to the victims of Indonesia's 2018 Sulawesi earthquake and tsunami.

Since November 5, 2019, the group has been appointed as the PR ambassador for the "S.A.V.E. Campaign" jointly launched by the Bestian Foundation and the Fire Department of South Korea. DKZ has been continuously promoting the campaign to improve the welfare of firefighters in the Republic of Korea and support the treatment and recovery of low-income burn patients.

On March 2, 2020, the members were selected as ambassadors for the Korea Science and Space Agency (YAK), a youth organization under the jurisdiction of the Ministry of Science and ICT.

== Artistry ==
They have cited BTS as their role models.

== Discography ==
=== Extended plays ===
Title	Details	Peak positions	Sales
Title	Details	KOR	Sales
Dongky Town	Released: November 6, 2019; Label: Dongyo Entertainment, Genie Music; Formats: CD, digital download, streaming; Track listing: 1. "Welcome to Dongky Town (Intro)"; 2. "Fever"; 3. "All I Need Is You"; 4. "Complete Me" (너로 인해 완벽해); 5. "Dreaming You" (상상 속의 너); 6. "Munik's Diary" (문익이의 일기) (hidden track); 7. "Fever" (Inst.)	57	KOR: 1,515
Reboot	Released: April 12, 2024; Label: Dongyo Entertainment, Genie Music; Formats: CD, digital download, streaming; Track listing: 1. "We're Together"; 2. "Like a Movie"; 3. "Special Day"; 4. "Recollection" (세상 가장 아름다웠던); 5. "Our Tomorrow"	12	KOR: 50,644
Tasty	Released: October 31, 2025; Label: Dongyo Entertainment, Genie Music; Formats: CD, digital download, streaming; Track listing: 1. "Appetite"; 2. "Replay My Anthem"; 3. "Love Game"; 4. "Best Friends"; 5. "Kick Down"; 6. "Eyes On You"	20	KOR: 20,620

=== Reissues ===
Title	Details	Peak positions	Sales
Title	Details	KOR	Sales
Harmony 1st Repackage Album (LP)	Released: April 24, 2023; Label: Dongyo Entertainment, Genie Music; Formats: LP, digital download, streaming; Track listing Side A: 1. "Nom" (놈); 2. "Blockbuster"; 3. "Dreaming You" (상상 속의 너); 4. "Fever"; 5. "All I Need Is You"; 6. "Complete Me" (너로 인해 완벽해); Side B: 1. "Lupin"; 2. "Beautiful" (아름다워); 3. "Universe"; 4. "Crazy Night" (못된 송아지 엉덩이에 뿔); 5. "Cupid" (사랑도둑); 6. "Uh-Heung" (호랑이가 쫓아온다); 7. "Harmony"	—N/a	KOR: 1,668

=== Single albums ===
Title	Details	Peak positions	Sales
Title	Details	KOR	Sales
Dongkiz on the Block	Released: April 24, 2019; Label: Dongyo Entertainment, NHN Bugs; Formats: CD, digital download, streaming; Track listing: 1. "Nom" (놈); 2. "Nom" (놈) (Remix); 3. "Nom" (놈) (Inst.)	58	—N/a
BlockBuster	Released: July 22, 2019; Label: Dongyo Entertainment, NHN Bugs; Formats: CD, digital download, streaming; Track listing: 1. "BlockBuster"; 2. "Special Thanks To (Wondae ver.)" (CD Only)	50	KOR: 634
Ego (자아; 自我; Jaa)	Released: August 19, 2020; Label: Dongyo Entertainment, Genie Music; Formats: CD, digital download, streaming; Track listing: 1. "Beautiful" (아름다워); 2. "Beautiful" (아름다워) (Inst.); 3. "Special Thanks To (Jonghyeong ver.)" (CD Only)	37	KOR: 5,057
Youniverse	Released: April 15, 2021; Label: Dongyo Entertainment, Genie Music; Formats: CD, digital download, streaming; Track listing: 1. "Universe"; 2. "Universe" (Inst.); 3. "Give You (Special Thanks to by Jaechan)" (CD Only)	67	KOR: 472
Chase Episode 1. Ggum	Released: July 1, 2021; Label: Dongyo Entertainment, Genie Music; Formats: CD, digital download, streaming; Track listing: 1. "Crazy Night" (못된 송아지 엉덩이에 뿔); 2. "Crazy Night" (못된 송아지 엉덩이에 뿔) (Inst.); 3. "Special Thanks To (Kyoungyoon ver.)" (CD Only)	37	KOR: 5,566
Chase Episode 2. Maum	Released: April 12, 2022; Label: Dongyo Entertainment, Genie Music; Formats: CD, digital download, streaming; Track listing: 1. "Cupid" (사랑도둑); 2. "Cupid" (사랑도둑) (Inst.)	3	KOR: 209,839
Chase Episode 3. Beum	Released: October 6, 2022; Label: Dongyo Entertainment, Genie Music; Formats: CD, digital download, streaming; Track listing: 1. "Uh-Heung" (호랑이가 쫓아온다); 2. "Uh-Heung" (호랑이가 쫓아온다) (Inst.)	5	KOR: 166,245
DKZ Year End Project Song 'It's All Right Part.3'	Released: December 31, 2022; Label: Dongyo Entertainment, Genie Music; Formats: PVC card, digital download, streaming; Track listing: 1. "2022 (Forever)"; 2. "2022 (Forever)" (Inst.)	12	KOR: 18,343

=== Singles ===
Title	Year	Peak chart positions	Album
Title	Year	KOR	Album
"Nom" (놈)	2018	—	Dongkiz on the Block
"BlockBuster"	2019	—	BlockBuster
"Dreaming You" (상상 속의 너)	2019	—	Dongky Town
"Fever"	2019	—	Dongky Town
"All I Need Is You"	2020	—	Dongky Town
"Lupin"	2020	—	Non-album single
"Beautiful" (아름다워)	2020	—	Ego (자아; 自我; Jaa)
"It's All Right"	2020	—	Non-album single
"Universe"	2021	—	Youniverse
"Crazy Night" (못된 송아지 엉덩이에 뿔)	2021	—	Chase Episode 1. Ggum
"2021 (Memories)"	2021	—	Non-album single
"Cupid" (사랑도둑)	2022	— (Note: "Cupid" did not enter the Circle Digital Chart, but appeared at number 10 on the component Download Chart.)	Chase Episode 2. Maum
"In the Rain (Prod. Lee Dae-hwi)" (잠 못 드는 밤 비는 내리고 (Prod. 이대휘))	2022	— (Note: "In the Rain (Prod. Lee Dae-hwi)" did not enter the Circle Digital Chart, but appeared at number 175 on the component Download Chart.)	Listen-Up (리슨업) EP.6
"Uh-Heung" (호랑이가 쫓아온다)	2022	64	Chase Episode 3. Beum
"2022 (Forever)"	2022	— (Note: "2022 (Forever)" did not enter the Circle Digital Chart, but appeared at number 101 on the component Download Chart.)	DKZ Year End Project Song 'It's All Right Part.3'
"Harmony"	2023	—	Harmony - 1st Repackage Album (LP)
"Daymoon" (낮달)	2023	—	Clef X Crew, 5th Story
"2023 (Friends)"	2023	—	DKZ Year End Project Song 'It's All Right Part.4'
"Like A Movie"	2024	—	Reboot
"2024 (Wishlist)"	2025	—	DKZ Year End Project Song 'It's All Right Part.5'
"Replay My Anthem"	2025	—	Tasty
"—" denotes releases that did not chart or were not released in that region.

=== Compilation appearances ===
Title	Year	Album
"Sunny" (orig. song by Boney M.) (with Ulala Session)	2022	Immortal Songs: Singing the Legend (Go-Go 70's Special)
"Can't Live Without You" (orig. song by Patti Kim)	2022	Immortal Songs: Singing the Legend (The One & Only Patti Kim, Part 2)
"What Should I Do?" (remake by YB of orig. song by Sand Pebbles)	2023	Immortal Songs: Singing the Legend (YB Band Special, Part 1)

=== Soundtrack appearances ===
Title	Year	Peak chart positions	Member(s)	Album
Title	Year	KOR Circle	Member(s)	Album
"I Wanna Be With You"	2020	—	Wondae	No Going Back Romance OST
"Our Season"	2022	— (Note: "Our Season" did not enter the Circle Digital Chart, but appeared at number 15 on the component Download Chart.)	Jaechan	Our Season: Spring with Park Jaechan OST
"Sunflower"	2025	—	All	Check-in Hanyang OST Part.6
"—" denotes releases that did not chart or were not released in that region.

== Videography ==
=== Music videos ===
Title	Year	Director(s)	Note	Ref.
"Nom" (놈)	2018	Kim Se Hwang (AVLE)	Pre-Debut Single	
"BlockBuster"	2019	Kim Se Hwang (AVLE)	—N/a	
"Dreaming You" (상상 속의 너)	2019	Unknown	—N/a	
"Fever"	2019	Kim Se Hwang (AVLE)	—N/a	
"All I Need Is You"	2020	Kim Se Hwang (AVLE)	—N/a	
"Lupin"	2020	Kim Se Hwang (AVLE)	—N/a	
"Y.O.U"	2020	Kang Mingi (aarch film)	1st Dongkiz Project "DONGKIZ I:KAN"	
"Beautiful" (아름다워)	2020	Lee Minjun, Lee Hayoung (MOSWANTD)	—N/a	
"It's All Right"	2020	Dongkiz	Dongkiz Year End Project Song "It's All Right Part.1"	
"Universe"	2021	Oh Jinuk (Allen's Eyes)	Performance Video	
"Crazy Night" (못된 송아지 엉덩이에 뿔)	2021	Park Sangmoo, Park Juhee (INYEON ENTERTAINMENT)	—N/a	
"2021 (Memories)"	2021	Dongkiz	Dongkiz Year End Project Song "It's All Right Part.2"	
"Cupid" (사랑도둑)	2022	Park Sangmoo, Park Juhee (INYEON ENTERTAINMENT)	New Members: Sehyeon, Mingyu, Giseok	
"Uh-Heung" (호랑이가 쫓아온다)	2022	Lee Kiseok (zany_layerZ)	—N/a	
"2022 (Forever)"	2022	DKZ	DKZ Year End Project Song "It's All Right Part.3"	

== Filmography ==
=== Web shows ===
Year	Title	Platform	Notes	Ref.
2019–2026	DKZ (Dongkiz) On Air	YouTube	Dongkiz/DKZ-based documentary	
2021	Dongkiz Healing Tour (Donggo Dongrak)	YouTube, V Live & Naver TV	Dongkiz-based reality show (7 episodes)	
2021	Dongky Town 高	YouTube	Special collaborative variety show with Kwanghee (3 episodes)	
2021	Dongky Town Company (DTC)	YouTube	Dongkiz-based variety show (4 episodes)	
2022	DKZ's Friendship and Joy 2 (Donggo Dongrak 2)	YouTube	DKZ-based reality show (8 episodes)	

=== Television shows ===
Year	Title	Network	Role	Notes	Ref.
2020	Good Girl	Mnet		Ep. 6 & 7	
2022	Immortal Songs 2	KBS	Contestant	Ep. 562: Go-Go 70's Special with Kyoungyoon, Mingyu, Jaechan, Juone and Ulala Session.	
2022	Immortal Songs 2	KBS	Contestant	Ep. 583: The One & Only Patti Kim, Part 2	
2022	Listen-Up	KBS	Representative Singer	Ep. 6: Round 4 - Remake Mission with Lee Dae-hwi.	
2022	Idol Drawing Contest	SBS	Regular Member	Ep. 2	
2023	Immortal Songs 2	KBS	Contestant	Ep. 597: YB Band Special, Part 1 with Kyoungyoon, Mingyu, Jaechan, and Juone	

=== Television series ===
Year	Title	Network	Role	Notes	Ref.
2019	Big Issue	SBS	Themselves	Ep. 3	

=== Web series ===
Year	Title	Platform	Role	Notes	Ref.
2022	Have A Good Neighbor	YouTube	Themselves	Ep. 2	

== Awards and nominations ==
Name of the award ceremony, year presented, category, nominee of the award, and the result of the nomination
Award ceremony	Year	Category	Nominee / Work	Result	Ref.
Asia Artist Awards	2019	Focus Award (Music)	Dongkiz	Won	
Asia Artist Awards	2022	Idolplus Popularity Award – Singer	DKZ	Nominated	
Asia Artist Awards	2023	Popularity Award – Male Singer	DKZ	Longlisted	
Asia Artist Awards	2024	Popularity Award – Male Singer	DKZ	Longlisted	
Brand Customer Loyalty Award (Note: Co-organized by the Korean Customers Council and Brand Keys, this event recognizes the most influential brands in society and culture, as determined through consumer research.)	2023	Most Influential Male Idol	DKZ	Nominated	
Brand of the Year Awards (Note: Established in 2003, the Brand of the Year Awards is an awards ceremony based on nationwide surveys hosted by the Korea Consumer Brand Committee and organized by the Korea Consumer Forum.)	2022	Male Idol – Rising Star	DKZ	Won	
Forbes Korea K-Pop Awards	2022	Best K-Pop Idols Who Shined in 2022 – Male	DKZ	Nominated	
Genie Music Awards	2022	Next Generation Award	DKZ	Won	
Hanteo Music Awards	2023	Post Generation Award	DKZ	Nominated	
Korea Culture and Entertainment Awards	2024	K-pop Singer Award	DKZ	Won	
Korea First Brand Awards (Note: Hosted by the Korea Consumer Brand Committee and supervised by the Korea Consumer Forum, the Korea First Brand Awards selects promising brands that will lead the year and bases its winners on consumption trend analysis, extensive nationwide consumer surveys, and evaluation and deliberation by experts.)	2023	Male Idol – Rising Star	DKZ	Nominated	
K-Star MVA (Note: A Japan-Korea joint project held by "IDOL CHAMP," a global support app for K-Pop idols, which awards the "Best Artist" who is most supported by global K-Pop fans and the "Next Star" who will carry the future of K-Pop.)	2023	Best Artist – Men	DKZ	Nominated	
Seoul Music Awards	2023	K-Wave Popularity Award	DKZ	Nominated	
Seoul Music Awards	2023	Main Award (Bonsang)	Chase Episode 2. Maum	Nominated	
Seoul Music Awards	2023	Popularity Award	DKZ	Nominated	

=== Honors ===
Name of organization, year given, and the name of the honor
Organization	Year	Honor	Ref.
Seoul Social Welfare Conference (Note: An event held annually since 2001, headed by the Seoul Social Welfare Council, to boost the morale of social workers and encourage social welfare activities among citizens.)	2023	Seoul Metropolitan Mayor's Commendation Volunteer Award	
