= Beasts of Asia =

South Korean TV series

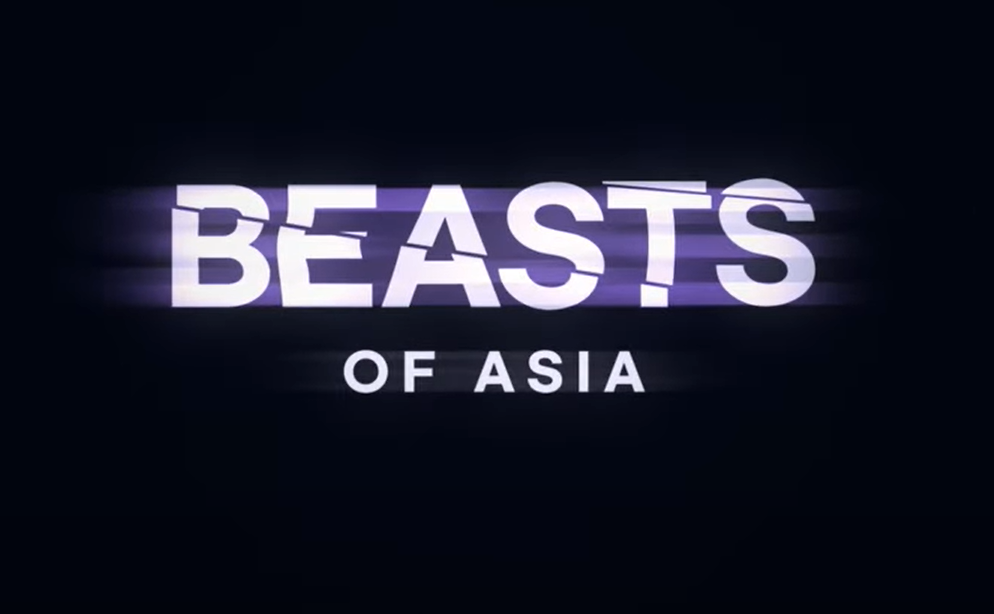
- Hangul: 비스트 오브 아시아
- RR: Biseuteu obeu Asia
- MR: Pisŭt'ŭ obŭ Asia
- Genre: Children's television series
- Written by: Kim Mi-ran
- Starring: An Jin-hyeon (S1); Jang Mun-ik (S1); Lee Kyoung-yoon (S1); Kim Min-seo (S2)
- Country of origin: South Korea
- Original language: Korean
- No. of seasons: 2
- No. of episodes: 12

Production
- Producer: Jeong Hyun-suk
- Running time: 20 minutes

Original release
- Network: Educational Broadcasting System
- Release: June 20, 2021 – October 19, 2022

Beasts of Asia (Korean: 비스트 오브 아시아) is an internationally co-produced children's and youth drama by EBS. The series features different myths from 12 Asian countries that have been reinterpreted in a contemporary way. Its first season aired on EBS 1TV every Sunday with five episodes from June 20 to July 18, 2021, starring An Jin-hyeon, Jang Mun-ik, and Lee Kyoung-yoon.

Its second season, Beasts of Asia 2, was broadcast on EBS 1TV from October 5 to October 19, 2022, every Wednesday to Friday. Kim Min-seo, from the first episode of the previous season, now leads the narration of the seven stories.

== Series overview ==
Season	Episodes	Originally released		Time slot
Season	Episodes	First released	Last released	Time slot
1	5	June 20, 2021	July 18, 2021	Sunday at 15:50 (KST)
2	7	October 5, 2022	October 19, 2022	Wednesday–Friday at 19:00 (KST)

== Synopsis ==
Beasts of Asia follows the story of the myths of 12 Asian countries, with a focus on Story Hunters - Sol, Min, Teo, and Eun-ho. Story Hunters are a small group of races with memories before the souls of humans and animals split. They seek out stories of people who have seen or benefited from talking beasts through "Cocoon", an online hub for Asian youth.

== Cast ==
=== Main ===
==== Season 1 ====
- An Jin-hyeon as Sol

Sol is the leader of Story Hunters. She is a direct descendant of Dangun and has the soul of a bear.

- Jang Mun-ik as Min

Min is the group's visual manager and an aspiring idol. His soul is feline and has quirky charms.

- Lee Kyoung-yoon as Teo

Teo is the brain of the group and has the soul of an owl. He is an animator and creates webtoon in Cocoon.

==== Season 2 ====
- Kim Min-seo as Eun-ho

Eun-ho is a next generation Story Hunter and an exemplary archer with a soul of a bear.

== Episodes ==
=== Season 1 ===
The first season introduced myths from five Asian countries, including Korea, India, Mongolia, Bhutan, and Vietnam.

No.	Title	Directed by	Original release date
1	"Part 1 - Training in Pairs"	Hyunsuk Jeong and Minhee Shim	June 20, 2021
The story of two promising archery players who reinterpreted the myth of Dangun in Korea.
2	"Part 2 - Cell Phones"	Hyunsuk Jeong, Anjusha Govind, and Minhee Shim	June 27, 2021
The story of a male student with performance anxiety who reinterprets the Indian turtle myth and a friend who helps him.
3	"Part 3 - Country Boy"	Hyunsuk Jeong, Ruby Sanseren Ariunjargal, and Minhee Shim	July 4, 2021
The adventure story of a boy who transferred from the countryside to the city and his friends who tormented him, reinterpreting the founding myth of Mongolia.
4	"Part 4 - Stepmom"	Hyunsuk Jeong, Kulawoti Guragai, and Minhee Shim	July 11, 2021
A story of a girl who lost her mother and a woman who one day visits her, reinterpreting the myth of a crane in Bhutan.
5	"Part 5 - My Hero, Quang Hai"	Hyunsook Chung and Nguyen Nhat Duy	July 18, 2021
A road trip story of four boys reinterpreting the myth of a toad in Vietnam.

=== Season 2 ===
The second season featured myths from seven countries, including Thailand, Laos, Cambodia, Indonesia, Malaysia, the Philippines, and Myanmar, completing the myth stories from 12 Asian countries.

No.	Title	Original release date
1	"Part 1 - My name is Inda!"	October 5, 2022
Childhood experiences pain and anxiety due to separation. A story about breaking out of fusion and growing into a true single person. This story is a modern reinterpretation of the Komodo lizard myth of Indonesia.
2	"Part 2 - Spring Day"	October 6, 2022
"Don't close your eyes when you come across something in life you'll have to fight." This story is a modern reinterpretation of the myth of the buffalo of Myanmar.
3	"Part 3 - Wings"	October 7, 2022
The heart-pounding 'call' that makes you go on an adventure away from your parents' realm - a story about leaving to find your dream. This story is a modern reinterpretation of Malaysia's Bird of Paradise myth.
4	"Part 4 - Quiz Heroes"	October 12, 2022
A 12-year-old who realizes that small everyday life becomes a huge life, feeling God's blessing. This story is a modern reinterpretation of the myth of the Naga of Laos.
5	"Part 5 - Sneakers"	October 13, 2022
Wouldn't we have done it if we had known the results? A story about the attitude of accepting choices and their consequences. About accepting the consequences as a part of your life, for better or for worse, and moving forward. This story is a modern reinterpretation of the myth of the elephant king of Cambodia.
6	"Part 6 - Secret"	October 14, 2022
How will a boy who has nowhere to put his mind or body to grow to become an adult? The story of a boy/girl who builds their own territory for the first time. This story is a modern reinterpretation of the myth of kite in the Philippines.
7	"Part 7 - Roast"	October 19, 2022
What happened in Himapan, where I went on the worst day of my 12 years of life. The main character, a boy who lived his whole life pursuing only the first place without any pleasure, learns the secret of living a happy life by being faithful to the present. This story is a modern reinterpretation of the myth of Himavanta in Thailand.

== Awards and nominations ==
Name of the award ceremony, year presented, category, nominee of the award, and the result of the nomination
Award ceremony	Year	Category	Nominee / Work	Result	Ref.
Chicago International Children's Film Festival (CICFF)	2021	Special Jury Award	Beasts of Asia	Second Place	
Outstanding Overseas Broadcasting Co-Production Grand Prize	2022	Grand Prize	Beasts of Asia	Won	
Seoul International Drama Awards	2022	Outstanding K-Pop Idol	Kyoungyoon	Nominated	
Seoul International Drama Awards	2022	Outstanding K-Pop Idol	Munik	Nominated	
