= Semantic Error (TV series) =

2022 South Korean web series

- Promotional poster
- Hangul: 시맨틱 에러
- RR: Simaentik ereo
- MR: Simaent'ik erŏ
- Genre: BL; Drama; Romantic comedy
- Based on: Semantic Error by Jeo Soo-ri
- Written by: Jason
- Directed by: Kim Soo-jung
- Starring: Park Seo-ham; Park Jae-chan
- Opening theme: "Romantic Devil" by Coldin
- Country of origin: South Korea
- Original language: Korean
- No. of episodes: 8

Production
- Producers: Kim Dong-rae; Im Min-ju; Kim So-hui; Park Ji-bok; SJ "SINXITY" Shin
- Cinematography: Ahn Gyeomseo
- Editor: Kim Tae-kyung
- Camera setup: Single camera
- Running time: 19–28 minutes
- Production companies: RaemongRaein; Axis

Original release
- Network: Watcha
- Release: February 16 – March 10, 2022

Semantic Error (Korean: 시맨틱 에러) is a 2022 South Korean streaming television series based on a homonymous BL web novel by Jeo Soo-ri, starring Park Seo-ham and Park Jae-chan. It premiered on February 16, 2022, on Watcha. The series is the first BL to achieve a major success in South Korea. The series became a social phenomenon and introduced the BL genre to the mainstream South Korean audience, which resulted in a rising production of South Korean BL dramas and films. The series was included on Teen Vogue's best BL dramas of 2022 list.

The theatrical version of the series, Semantic Error: The Movie, was first screened at the 26th Bucheon International Fantastic Film Festival and commercially released in August 2022.

A less well-known anime version of the same source material appeared in 2021, produced and streamed by Laftel.

== Synopsis ==
Computer science major Choo Sang-woo (Park Jae-chan) is the embodiment of an inflexible and strict rule-abiding person. While working on a liberal arts group project with collaborators who don't put in any effort, Sang-woo decides to remove their names from the final presentation. This causes him to become involved with the person whose plans to study abroad were messed up because of that project. The involved person is Department of Design's Jang Jae-young (Park Seo-ham).

== Cast ==
=== Main ===
- Park Seo-ham as Jang Jae-young
- Park Jae-chan as Choo Sang-woo

=== Supporting ===
- Kim Noh-jin as Ryu Ji-hye
- Cha Jae-hoon as Lee Dong-gun
- Song Ji-oh as Choi Yu-na
- Kim Won-ki as Go Hyeong-taek
- Jung Joon-gyo as Ted Hyung

=== Guest ===
- Lee Kyoung-yoon as waiter (Episode 5)
- Kim Jong-hyeong as a customer (Episode 5)
- Kim Se-hyeon as a customer (Episode 5)
- Jeon Min-gyu as a customer (Episode 5)
- Ryu Gi-seok as a customer (Episode 5)

== Awards and nominations ==
Name of the award ceremony, year presented, award category, nominee(s) of the award, and the result of the nomination
Award	Year	Category	Nominee(s) / Work(s)	Result	Ref.
APAN Star Awards	2022	Best Couple Award	Park Jae-chan and Park Seo-ham	Won	
APAN Star Awards	2022	Popular Star Award (Actor)	Park Jae-chan	Won	
APAN Star Awards	2022	Best New Actor	Park Seo-ham	Nominated	
Blue Dragon Series Awards	2022	Best New Actor	Park Jae-chan and Park Seo-ham	Nominated	
Blue Dragon Series Awards	2022	Popular Star Award	Park Jae-chan and Park Seo-ham	Won	
Brand of the Year Awards (Note: Established in 2003, the Brand of the Year Awards is an awards ceremony based on nationwide surveys hosted by the Korea Consumer Brand Committee and organized by the Korea Consumer Forum.)	2022	Acting Idol of the Year (Male)	Park Jae-chan	Won	
Grand Bell Awards	2022	Daejong's Expected Award	Kim Soo-jung (Semantic Error: The Movie)	Nominated	
Grand Bell Awards	2022	New Wave Award (Actor)	Park Jae-chan	Won	
Korea Best Brand Awards (Note: Hosted by The JoongAng and Forbes Korea, the Korea Best Brand Awards bases its winners on the best brands selected by the market and consumers.)	2023	Best Drama Actor/Artist	Park Seo-ham	Won	
Seoul International Drama Awards	2022	Outstanding K-Pop Idol	Park Jae-chan	Nominated	
Seoul International Drama Awards	2022	Outstanding Korean Actor	Park Jae-chan	Nominated	
Seoul International Drama Awards	2022	Outstanding Korean Actor	Park Seo-ham	Nominated	
Seoul International Drama Awards	2022	Outstanding Korean Drama OST	Coldin ("Romantic Devil")	Nominated	

== Earlier anime ==
Laftel adapted the story into an anime series format. This version consisted of only four episodes, each four minutes long. The series aired between March and April 2021.

== See also ==
- List of BL dramas
