= The First Responders =

2022 South Korean television series

- Promotional poster for season 2
- Also known as: The First Responders 2; The Police Station Next to the Fire Station and the National Forensic Service
- Hangul: 소방서 옆 경찰서
- Lit.: The Police Station Next to the Fire Station
- RR: Sobangseo yeop gyeongchalseo
- MR: Sobangsŏ yŏp kyŏngch'alsŏ
- Genre: Crime; Thriller; Mystery
- Developed by: Studio S
- Written by: Min Ji-eun
- Directed by: Shin Kyung-soo; Kwon Bong-geun (Season 2)
- Starring: Kim Rae-won; Son Ho-jun; Gong Seung-yeon
- Music by: Lee Kwang-hee
- Country of origin: South Korea
- Original language: Korean
- No. of seasons: 2
- No. of episodes: 24

Production
- Executive producers: Cho Seung-hoon (CP); Park Young-soo
- Producers: Lee Him-chan; Park Sang-jin; Kim Yong-jin
- Running time: 60~70 minutes
- Production companies: Studio S; Mega Monster

Original release
- Network: SBS TV
- Release: November 12, 2022 – September 9, 2023

The First Responders (Korean: 소방서 옆 경찰서) is a South Korean television series starring Kim Rae-won, Son Ho-jun, and Gong Seung-yeon. The first season aired every Friday and Saturday at 22:00 from November 12 to December 30, 2022 on SBS TV (KST). The second season premiered on August 4, 2023 and aired every Friday and Saturday at 22:00 (KST). It is also available for streaming on Disney+ in selected regions.

== Synopsis ==
It depicts the joint response field log between the police who catch criminals, and the firefighters who put out fires. The police and fire station jointly respond to fierce scenes of crimes, disasters and emergencies.

== Cast and characters ==
=== Main ===
- Kim Rae-won as Jin Ho-gae, a police detective team inspector in Taewon who was formerly from the Regional Investigation Unit.
- Son Ho-jun as Bong Do-jin, a firefighter at Taewon Fire Station (Fire Bridge) who works as a fire investigator.
- Gong Seung-yeon as Song Seol, a paramedic at Taewon Fire Station who cares for even the smallest wounds.

=== Supporting ===
==== People around Taewon Police Station ====
- Seo Hyun-chul as Baek Cham, the chief detective of Taewon Police Station.
- Kang Ki-doong as Gongmyung Pil, the talented sergeant with great agility and good relationships, and the pillar of Taewon Police Station.
- Ji Woo as Bong An-na, chief of the Science Investigation Team of Taewon Police Station, and Bong Do-jin's younger sister.
- Baek Eun-hye as Woo Sam-soon, Forensic Team leader.

==== People around Taewon Fire Station ====
- Woo Mi-hwa as Dok Go-soon, an on-site fire police, and commander of Taewon Fire Station.
- Jung Jin-woo as Choi Ki-soo, a rescue worker at Taewon Fire Station who has a heart softer than anyone else.
- Lee Woo-je as Han Dong-woo, a doctor at Taewon Fire Station, and Song Seol's partner as an ambulance firefighter.

==== People around national forensic scientist ====
- Son Ji-yoon as Yoon Hong, a forensic officer in the autopsy room.

==== People around Taewon General Hospital ====
- Yang Jong-wook as Cha Jae-hee, an emergency medicine doctor a.k.a Teacher Cha. A specialist with a double board certification in emergency medicine and general surgery.
- Lee Hwa-jeong as Han Su-jin, a 2nd year resident at Taewon General Hospital's Department of Emergency Medicine.

Season 1

- Heo Ji-won as Kwak Kyung-jun, Taewon General Hospital's emergency room head nurse. He was the real culprit who kidnapped Kim Hyeon-seo 7 years ago.

==== Others ====
- Jo Seung-yeon as Jin Cheol-jung, prosecutor of the Eastern District Attorney's Office and Jin Ho-gae's father.
- Lee Do-yeop as Ma Tae-hwa, son of the next presidential candidate and party leader, Ma Jung-do.
- Jeon Kook-hwan as Ma Jung-do, member of the National Assembly, and the next presidential candidate. Ma Tae-hwa's father.
- Seo Jae-gyu as Yeom Sang-goo, a prosecutor at the Eastern District Attorney's Office.
- Jo Hee-bong as Yang Chi-young, Ma Tae-hwa's lawyer who has multiple CPA Accountant Certifications.
- Oh Eui-shik as Kang Do-ha, National Forensic Officer and former Republic of Korea Air Force's EOD Captain.
- Jeon Sung-woo as Han Se-jin / Dex Kates, a Korean-American professor of forensic medicine at Aewol University in Jeju, and a forensic scientist assigned by the National Forensic Service. He was adopted by an American family.

=== Extended ===
- Lee Ji-won as Kim So-hee, the kidnapped victim in Episode 1.
- Yoon Seok-hyun as Jo Doo-chil, the murderer who tried to kill Kim So-hee, and who met Jin Ho-gae again in prison.
- Jung Jae-eun as Kim So-hee's mother.
- Kim Min-seo as Kim Hyeon-seo, high school student who attempts suicide due to blackmail.
- Cha Seong-je as Yang Jun-tae, Hyeon-seo's class president. The person who was the direct cause of Hyeon-seo's suicide, he introduced illegal internet gambling to Hyeon-seo.
- Noh Sussanna as Woo Mi-young, Park Tae-hoon's ex-girlfriend. Later revealed as Park Tae-hoon's killer.
- Won Woo-jun as Park Tae-hoon, reported missing while preparing for the civil service exam. Woo Mi-young's ex-boyfriend.
- Jung Wook-jin as Choi Seok-doo, a part-time employee in a convenience store, and the real drug buyer.
- Ji Hyung-jun as Kim Hyung
- Hwang Young-hee as Song Hee-sook
- Kwak Ji-hye as Song Ha-eun, an 18-year-old old high school student who aborted her baby and disposed of it in her mother's bag.
- Lee Ji-ha as Gong Ju-soon
- Choi Hee-jin as Bang Ja-kyung, Song Ha-eun's mother.
- Lee So-ee as Kim Hyeon-seo, a girl who was kidnapped 7 years ago, and was last seen by Jin Ho-gae.
- Choi Won-young as Ha Young-doo, Korea's first serial arsonist.
- Park Min-jung as Seo Mi-jung

=== Special appearances ===
- Yoon Seo-hyun as Cho Man-sik, Kim Hyeon-seo's real father.
- Moon Won-joo as Kwak
- Lee Tae-gum as Min Won-in, the owner of the car that Choi Ki-soo drives.
- Choi Moo-sung as Seok Mun-go, an anesthesiologist and Seok Mi-jung's father.
- Seo Dong-won as the Mutual Aid Company president.

== Production ==
=== Casting ===
On January 24, 2022, actors Kim Rae-won, Son Ho-jun, and Gong Seung-yeon were confirmed to have joined the cast as the leads.

=== Filming ===
On March 3, 2022, it was reported that PD Lee Him-chan, who was working as a producer for The First Responders, had died on January 30, and his family complained that it was due to the pressure of hard work. Due to the incident, filming for the series was halted in February 2022, and it was resumed in May.

=== Release ===
The series was originally scheduled for release in the first half of 2022, but was postponed to the second half of the year.

On January 5, 2022, it was reported that the series would have a total of two seasons with 12 episodes per season. In September, it was officially announced that the first season would air on November 12, while the second season would air in the second half of 2023.

On November 22, 2022, writer Min Ji-eun confirmed in an interview that there will be a second season.

== Original soundtrack ==
=== Part 1 ===
Released on November 12, 2022
No.	Title	Lyrics	Music	Artist	Length
1.	"Fire"	J.SEASON; Zeenan	CUZD; DONNA	Kihyun	3:50
2.	"Fire" (Inst.)		CUZD; DONNA		3:50
Total length:					7:00

=== Part 2 ===
Released on November 18, 2022
No.	Title	Lyrics	Music	Artist	Length
1.	"To Anywhere (어디로든)"	CHAEIPAPA; Earl Drain; G-GANG	CHAEIPAPA; Earl Drain; Yoo Young-jun	Standing Egg	4:29
2.	"To Anywhere (어디로든)" (Inst.)		CHAEIPAPA; Earl Drain; Yoo Young-jun		4:29
Total length:					8:58

=== Part 3 ===
Released on November 25, 2022
No.	Title	Lyrics	Music	Artist	Length
1.	"Heaven For You"	Earl Drain; CHAEIPAPA	CHAEIPAPA; Earl Drain; Holynn; Kim Hyun-jun	Chen	4:23
2.	"Heaven For You" (Inst.)		CHAEIPAPA; Earl Drain; Holynn; Kim Hyun-jun		4:23
Total length:					8:46

=== Part 4 ===
Released on December 2, 2022
No.	Title	Lyrics	Music	Artist	Length
1.	"Rescue 구해"	Paloalto	Paloalto; Yosi; Park Gi-sung	Paloalto	2:54
2.	"Rescue 구해" (Inst.)		Paloalto; Yosi; Park Gi-sung		2:54
Total length:					5:08

=== Part 5 ===
Released on December 9, 2022
No.	Title	Lyrics	Music	Artist	Length
1.	"The Name of You 너란이름"	ALDRAIN	SENTIMENTAL; SCENERY	Sondia	3:33
2.	"The Name of You 너란이름" (Inst.)		SENTIMENTAL; SCENERY		3:33
Total length:					6:66

=== Part 6 ===
Released on December 16, 2022
No.	Title	Lyrics	Music	Artist	Length
1.	"Hold My Breath"	J.SEASON; Red Sock; INAN	Red Sock; INAN; Kim Mi-sung	ROSE	4:13
2.	"Hold My Breath" (Inst.)		Red Sock; INAN; Kim Mi-sung		4:13
Total length:					8:26

== Viewership ==
The First Responders : South Korea viewers per episode (millions)

Season	Episode number												Average
Season	1	2	3	4	5	6	7	8	9	10	11	12	Average
1	1.619	1.836	1.685	1.447	1.487	1.933	1.678	1.635	1.743	1.531	1.907	1.959	1.705
2	1.399	1.084	1.273	1.261	1.332	1.162	1.213	1.122	1.098	1.392	1.451	1.865	1.304

Source: Audience measurement performed nationwide by Nielsen Korea.

=== Season 1 ===
Average TV viewership ratings (season 1)
Ep.	Original broadcast date	Average audience share		
Ep.	Original broadcast date	Nielsen Korea		TNmS
Ep.	Original broadcast date	Nationwide	Seoul	Nationwide
1	November 12, 2022	7.6% (2nd)	7.8% (2nd)	6.9% (3rd)
2	November 18, 2022	9.4% (3rd)	10.0%(3rd)	7.1% (6th)
3	November 19, 2022	8.5% (2nd)	9.0% (2nd)	8.3% (2nd)
4	November 25, 2022	7.6% (4th)	7.6% (5th)	6.8% (7th)
5	November 26, 2022	7.5% (4th)	7.8% (3rd)	7.2% (4th)
6	December 2, 2022	9.4% (5th)	9.8% (5th)	9.5% (5th)
7	December 3, 2022	8.4% (4th)	8.9% (5th)	8.0% (6th)
8	December 9, 2022	8.2% (4th)	8.5% (4th)	7.5% (7th)
9	December 10, 2022	8.2% (3rd)	8.7% (2nd)	7.6% (3rd)
10	December 16, 2022	7.7% (5th)	8.2% (3rd)	7.5% (7th)
11	December 23, 2022 (Note: Episode 11 will not air due to the 2022 SBS Entertainment Awards and will air on December 23 instead.)	9.7% (3rd)	10.4% (3rd)	8.8% (6th)
12	December 30, 2022 (Note: Episode 12 will not air due to the SBS Gayo Daejeon and will air on December 30 instead.)	10.3% (3rd)	10.9% (3rd)	8.5% (7th)
Average		8.5%	8.9%	7.8%
In the table above, the blue numbers represent the lowest ratings and the red numbers represent the highest ratings.

=== Season 2 ===
Average TV viewership ratings (season 2)
Ep.	Original broadcast date	Average audience share		
Ep.	Original broadcast date	Nielsen Korea		TNmS
Ep.	Original broadcast date	Nationwide	Seoul	Nationwide
1	August 4, 2023	7.1% (5th)	7.5% (3rd)	N/A (Note: Due to unknown reasons, TNmS did not issue the average TV viewership ratings for all free-to-air television programs in South Korea from August 4 to 10, 2023. TNmS resumed issuing those for the August 11, 2023 24-hour period on August 12, 2023.)
2	August 5, 2023	5.1% (4th)	5.4% (8th)	N/A
3	August 11, 2023	6.5% (7th)	6.7% (7th)	6.3% (9th)
4	August 12, 2023	6.0% (3rd)	6.1% (2nd)	5.6% (6th)
5	August 18, 2023	6.3% (7th)	6.5% (5th)	6.0% (10th)
6	August 19, 2023	6.1% (3rd)	6.0% (3rd)	N/A
7	August 25, 2023	6.2% (7th)	6.5% (5th)	4.9% (12th)
8	August 26, 2023	6.3% (3rd)	6.6% (3rd)	N/A
9	September 1, 2023	5.5% (7th)	5.7% (8th)	5.4% (12th)
10	September 2, 2023	6.5% (4th)	6.4% (4th)	N/A
11	September 8, 2023	8.0% (3rd)	7.8% (3rd)	N/A
12	September 9, 2023	9.3% (2nd)	9.0% (2nd)	N/A
Average		6.6%	6.7%	— (Note: Due to multiple unpublished ratings, the exact average rating is unknown.)
In the table above, the blue numbers represent the lowest ratings and the red numbers represent the highest ratings.; N/A denotes that the rating is not known.

== Awards and nominations ==
Name of the award ceremony, year presented, category, nominee of the award, and the result of the nomination
Award ceremony	Year	Category	Nominee / Work	Result	Ref.
SBS Drama Awards	2022	Top Excellence Award, Actor in a Miniseries Genre/Fantasy Drama	Kim Rae-won	Won	
SBS Drama Awards	2022	Excellence Award, Actress in a Miniseries Genre/Fantasy Drama	Gong Seung-yeon	Won	
SBS Drama Awards	2022	Best Supporting Actor in a Miniseries Genre/Fantasy Drama	Kang Ki-doong	Won	
SBS Drama Awards	2022	Best Young Actress	Kim Min-seo	Won	
SBS Drama Awards	2022	Grand Prize (Daesang)	Kim Rae-won	Nominated	
SBS Drama Awards	2022	Excellence Award, Actor in a Miniseries Genre/Fantasy Drama	Son Ho-jun	Nominated	
SBS Drama Awards	2022	Best Supporting Actress in a Miniseries Genre/Fantasy Drama	Ji Woo	Nominated	
SBS Drama Awards	2023	Best Supporting Actress in a Seasonal Drama	Son Ji-yoon	Won	
SBS Drama Awards	2023	Grand Prize (Daesang)	Kim Rae-won	Nominated	
SBS Drama Awards	2023	Top Excellence Award, Actor in a Seasonal Drama	Kim Rae-won	Nominated	
SBS Drama Awards	2023	Top Excellence Award, Actress in a Seasonal Drama	Gong Seung-yeon	Nominated	
SBS Drama Awards	2023	Excellence Award, Actor in a Seasonal Drama	Kang Ki-doong	Nominated	
SBS Drama Awards	2023	Excellence Award, Actress in a Seasonal Drama	Woo Mi-hwa	Nominated	
SBS Drama Awards	2023	Best Supporting Actor in a Seasonal Drama	Oh Eui-shik	Nominated	
SBS Drama Awards	2023	Best Young Actress	Ahn Se-bin	Nominated	
SBS Drama Awards	2023	Scene Stealer Award	Jeon Sung-woo	Nominated	
