= The Heavenly Idol =

2023 South Korean television series

- Promotional poster
- Hangul: 성스러운 아이돌
- Hanja: 聖스러운 아이돌
- Lit.: Holy Idol
- RR: Seongseureoun aidol
- MR: Sŏngsŭrŏun aidol
- Genre: Fantasy; Romantic comedy
- Based on: The Heavenly Idol (lit. Holy Idol) by Mythology Jin (Shin Hwa-jin)
- Developed by: Studio Dragon (planning)
- Written by: Lee Cheon-geum
- Directed by: Lee So-yoon; Park So-yeon
- Starring: Kim Min-kyu; Go Bo-gyeol; Lee Jang-woo
- Music by: Heo Seong-jin
- Country of origin: South Korea
- Original language: Korean
- No. of episodes: 12

Production
- Executive producer: Kwon Byung-wook
- Producers: Yoon Se-yeol; Jeong Hoe-seok
- Editor: Jung Ye-na
- Running time: 70 minutes
- Production companies: Pitapaet Studio; Hi Ground

Original release
- Network: tvN
- Release: February 15 – March 23, 2023

The Heavenly Idol (Korean: 성스러운 아이돌) is a 2023 South Korean television series starring Kim Min-kyu, Go Bo-gyeol and Lee Jang-woo. The story is based on the Munpia and Naver Series web novel of the same name by Mythology Jin (Shin Hwa-jin). It aired on tvN every Wednesday and Thursday at 22:30 (KST) from February 15 to March 23, 2023. It is also available for streaming on Viki and Viu in selected regions.

== Synopsis ==
In the supernatural Other World, the Pontifex (Note: 대신관; daesingwan; 'high priest') Rembrary and his troops battle against dark forces in a campaign to thwart the Evil One's (Note: 마왕; mawang; 'evil king; king of devils') return to power after a hundred years. Just as he takes the upper hand in a tough duel against the Evil One, an inexplicable force foils Rembrary's victory and transports him to the present world. He finds himself in the body of a K-pop idol named Woo Yeon-woo, a member of the boy group Wild Animal. The true Yeon-woo has been transported to the Other World in Rembrary's body. Naive about the workings of the present world, Rembrary struggles to live as a K-pop idol while finding a way to return to the Other World to restore himself and Yeon-woo to their original bodies and save the two worlds from the Evil One.

== Cast ==
=== Main ===
- Kim Min-kyu as Rembrary / Woo Yeon-woo
1. Rembrary: a Pontifex (Daesin-gwan) from the Other World who is suddenly transported to the present world, waking up in the body of the K-pop idol Woo Yeon-woo. The 23rd Pontifex serving the deity Redrin, Rembrary is known for his dashing looks, strong morality and his compassion for the people of the Other World. He possesses divine powers that he uses in fighting against dark forces. While battling against the Evil One, he is inexplicably transported to the present world and finds himself in Yeon-woo's body. He then struggles to live as a K-pop idol while finding a way to return to the Other World and save the people from the Evil One's potential return to power.
2. Woo Yeon-woo: the main rapper and sub-vocalist of the K-pop boy group Wild Animal under LLL Entertainment. After originally auditioning as an aspiring actor, Yeon-woo debuted five years ago as a K-pop idol at the recommendation of the CEO who admired his handsome looks. Whilst being an idol, he did not give up on his dream to become an actor. Minutes before a live music show broadcast, he is suddenly transported to the Other World and finds himself in Rembrary's body.
- Go Bo-gyeol as Kim Dal

Wild Animal's new talent manager and a big fan of Woo Yeon-woo. A former talent manager for a K-pop girl group, Dal slumped into depression after one of the group's members committed suicide. Finding new hope from fangirling for Woo Yeon-woo, she ultimately decides to apply as Wild Animal's new manager and help them attain stardom. Unbelieving at first, she later becomes one of the very few people aware of Rembrary's true identity.

- Lee Jang-woo as the Evil One (Mawang) / Shin Jo-woon

The King of Evil of the Other World and Rembrary's archenemy. After a hundred years of dormancy, the Evil One threatens to regain supreme power over the Other World. He pursues Rembrary across dimensions and manifests himself in the present world as Shin Jo-woon, the vice chairman of RU E&M, an entertainment company. He uses his black magic to trigger or aggravate his victim's inner evils and darkness to turn them into his minions against their will.

=== Supporting ===
People in the LLL Entertainment

- Ye Ji-won as Im Sun-ja

CEO of LLL Entertainment, the agency of K-pop boy group Wild Animal; Sun Woo-sil's ex-girlfriend.

- Hong Seung-beom as Choi Jeong-seo

The leader and sub-rapper of Wild Animal.

- Shin Myung-seung as Hwang Tae-in

The main vocalist of Wild Animal.

- Choi Jae-hyun as Kasy

The lead vocalist of Wild Animal.

- Shin Kyu-hyeon as Cha Hae-gyeol

The youngest member and main dancer of Wild Animal.

People in the entertainment industry

- Tak Jae-hoon as Sun Woo-sil

A senior artist who hates Woo Yeon-woo; CEO Im's ex-boyfriend.

- Lee Dal as Kim Moo-rok

A popular television producer, known for his "evil editing" (angma-ui pyeonjip) and producing TV shows with high viewership ratings.

- Oh Jin-seok as Oh Jung-shin

The youngest member of the boy group AX.

- Kim Seo-ha as Maeng Woo-shin

A famous actor who is a member of a secretive all-celebrity religious cult called Hongwoodaedae.

Members of Evil Boys

Evil Boys is a K-pop boy group whose members turned into malevolent yogoe (goblin). Once a struggling group like Wild Animals, the band unknowingly bargained their souls with Hongwoodaedae's leader in return for their success and popularity, but the deal caused their gradual transformation into yogoe.

- Jung Su-hyeon as Raken

The leader of the boy group Evil Boys and a fully-transformed yogoe.

- Wonjun (Note: He is the main rapper and vocalist of E'LAST.) as Typhon

The youngest member of Evil Boys. Gradually transforming into a yogoe, Typhon has become terrified of what the group has become.

- Lee Woo-tae as Vasily

The main dancer of the Evil Boys.

Beings in the Afterlife

- Jang Young-nam as Yeomra

The present world's deity of the afterlife who rules and oversees the fate of humans.

- Park Sang-nam as Sa Gam-jae

A grim reaper sent to the mortal realm to inspect suspicious events involving Rembrary and other beings from the Other World; Wild Animal's new road manager.

Beings from the Other World

- Cha Joo-young as Redrin

A deity who is the creator of the Other World. Redrin appears like a young adult woman and keeps the boundary between the underworld and the present world.

=== Others ===
- Baek Seo-bin as Chief Jang
- Ryu Seung-moo as a hwansin

A mysterious being who is targeting Rembrary for another purpose while serving the Evil One. Existing in both the present and Other World, a hwansin is a former human who lost his or her physical body after making a deal with an evil being.

=== Special appearances ===
- Nature as the popular girl group Queen Crush (Note: The four members of Nature who play the members of Queen Crush are: Sohee (Main Vocalist), Aurora (Lead Dancer, Sub-Vocalist and Visual), Loha (Main Rapper and Lead Dancer) and Uchae (Lead Dancer, Sub-Vocalist, Sub-Rapper and Visual).)
- E'Last
- Ahn Se-ha as Wild Animal's ex-manager
- Jonghyeong and Mingyu

Two members of the group Nine to Six (Note: Nine to Six is the second subunit of boygroup DKZ (the first subunit is Dongkiz, I:Kan, formed by Jaechan and former member Munik) and is formed by the group's leader Jonghyeong and main vocalist Mingyu.)

- Lee Sun-bin as acting trainer

== Episodes ==
No.	Title	Original release date
1	"Episode 1"	February 15, 2023
In the Other World, Rembrary takes the upper hand in a duel against the Evil One, but an inexplicable force suddenly foils his victory and transports him to the present world. He finds himself in the body of the K-pop idol Woo Yeon-woo, a member of the boy group Wild Animal, and causes an incident in a live TV broadcast that soon becomes viral. He later senses the Evil One's arrival in Yeon-woo's world.
2	"Episode 2"	February 16, 2023
Rembrary is cast for the music show Sing Survival, while former talent manager Kim Dal is accepted as Wild Animal's new manager. Rembrary uses his powers to establish contact with Yeon-woo, who is already unwilling to return to the present world. He strikes a compelling deal with Yeon-woo and leads him into making a holy vow that can expedite their restoration to each of their worlds.
3	"Episode 3"	February 22, 2023
The Evil One, in the guise of RU E&M vice chairman Shin Jo-woon, uses his black magic to control Sing Survival's chief producer Kim Moo-rok. Despite being strongly affronted by apparently immoral lyrics, Rembrary showcases a sublime performance in the first round of Sing Survival, catching the audience's attention. For the upcoming second round, he becomes partnered with Sun Woo-sil who hates Yeon-woo's poor singing skills.
4	"Episode 4"	February 23, 2023
While performing for the second round of Sing Survival, Rembrary uses his divine powers to cast out the Evil One's black magic that made Woo-sil voiceless, and the duo places first in the rankings. Yeomra orders for an inspector to find out who is meddling with the fate of humans. Amidst Wild Animal's newfound fame through Rembrary's performance, Kasy gets caught in a dating scandal. The Evil One takes advantage of Sing Survival contestant Oh Jung-shin's deep-seated envy for "Yeon-woo" to use him in defeating Rembrary.
5	"Episode 5"	March 1, 2023
Dal witnesses Rembrary's true identity when the Pontifex uses his divine powers against the black magic that transformed Jung-shin into a murderous demonic minion. As rumors of "Yeon-woo" having healing powers become viral, Dal has to pressure Rembrary into changing his behavior to keep his true identity a secret from anyone. Rembrary triggers Jung-shin into making a holy vow that will force him to admit his submission to the Evil One's will once Rembrary outranks him in Sing Survival.
6	"Episode 6"	March 2, 2023
Rembrary falls into the Evil One's trap which had him arrested by police using trumped-up allegations. While in police custody, Rembrary is attacked by a hwansin serving the Evil One, but the attack was ordered by another master. While rushing the wounded Rembrary to the hospital, Dal takes the opportunity to debunk all allegations against "Yeon-woo". As Dal becomes engrossed in her workload in preparation for Wild Animal's new single, Rembrary tries to encourage her to open up about her painful past.
7	"Episode 7"	March 8, 2023
Rembrary makes some clumsy attempts to prove himself worthy to enter Hongwoodaedae, a secret all-celebrity religious cult which seems to have a connection to Redrin. An argument between Jeong-seo and Tae-in accidentally reveals to Dal a disappointing truth about Yeon-woo. Rembrary and Tae-in are cast in a variety show alongside Jung-shin. While Jung-shin attempts to lure Rembrary to his death, Dal unknowingly enters the Evil One's lair in Vice-chairman Shin's office.
8	"Episode 8"	March 9, 2023
Yeomra promises Rembrary an easy path towards meeting Redrin in return for catching a group of yogoe hiding in the entertainment industry, insinuating that Hongwoodaedae is up to no good. Rembrary and Sa Gam-jae rescue Dal from the Evil One. As Dal struggles against the black magic's influence, Rembrary joins a variety show which has cast Evil Boys' band leader Raken, a yogoe in disguise.
9	"Episode 9"	March 15, 2023
While being cured of black magic, Dal confesses her feelings to Rembrary; the two are soon caught in a dating scandal. As the Evil One threatens to harm Wild Animal and CEO Im Sun-ja, Dal sacrifices her reputation to promptly quell the scandal. Raken's co-member Typhon confesses to Rembrary the shady deal their band made with Hongwoodaedae. The Evil One curses with illness scores of people who used a product that Rembrary advertised, just as Rembrary fully lost his divine powers.
10	"Episode 10"	March 16, 2023
Just as what the Evil One had wanted, Rembrary sinks into deep despondency as he loses his capability to save innocent lives. Dal rallies LLL Entertainment to fight for the truth as the Evil One further inflames the public's anger, frustration, and despair against Rembrary. Gam-jae proposes a plan to restore Rembrary's divine powers, but it comes with a price the Pontifex is not willing to pay. When all hope seems lost. As Dal tries sacrificing herself once again, Rembrary finally realizes what it really takes for his divine powers to return.
11	"Episode 11"	March 22, 2023
Rembrary discovers a way to convince Raken and his co-members to abandon their Hongwoodaedae contracts and become human again. A stronger Evil One gatecrashes an awarding ceremony and nearly kills Rembrary just as all conditions of Rembrary and Yeon-woo's deal become fulfilled. Rembrary and Yeon-woo are promptly restored to each of their worlds, but the Pontifex and Dal-soon realize something is wrong. Desperate to help Rembrary, Dal pleads with Yeomra to allow her to enter the Other World via the Afterlife.
12	"Episode 12"	March 23, 2023
Redrin escapes to the present world and steals the Evil One of his powers. Dal brings a devastated Rembrary back to the present world, and Wild Animal is shocked to see two people named "Yeon-woo". Now introduced to Rembrary's identity, the band soon realizes that the Yeon-woo they knew for years is not who they think he is. Wanting to save both worlds from Redrin, Rembrary confronts her at Hongwoodaedae as the broken-hearted Evil One seeks answers. Dal sacrifices herself for the final time to help Rembrary defeat Redrin once and for all.

== Original soundtrack ==
=== Part 1 ===
Released on February 16, 2023
No.	Title	Lyrics	Music	Artist	Length
1.	"Suddenly" (문득 내게 와)	Heo Seong-jin	Heo Seong-jin; Diori	Yoo Seung-woo	3:23
2.	"Suddenly" (문득 내게 와; Inst.)		Heo Seong-jin; Diori		3:23
Total length:					6:46

=== Part 2 ===
Released on February 23, 2023
No.	Title	Lyrics	Music	Artist	Length
1.	"In Those Days" (그 시절)	Lee Gi-hwan; Mr. Moon	Lee Gi-hwan; Mr. Moon	O.When	4:03
2.	"In Those Days" (그 시절; Inst.)		Lee Gi-hwan; Mr. Moon		4:03
Total length:					8:06

=== Part 3 ===
Released on March 2, 2023
No.	Title	Lyrics	Music	Artist	Length
1.	"Please"	Kim Beom-ju; Kim Si-hyuk	Kim Beom-ju; Kim Si-hyuk	Onestar (Lim Han-byul)	3:56
2.	"Please" (Inst.)		Kim Beom-ju; Kim Si-hyuk		3:56
Total length:					7:52

== Viewership ==
The Heavenly Idol : South Korea viewers per episode (thousands)

Season	Episode number												Average
Season	1	2	3	4	5	6	7	8	9	10	11	12	Average
1	750	505	418	381	499	332	431	301	411	282	347	327	415

Source: Audience measurement performed nationwide by Nielsen Korea.

Average TV viewership ratings
Ep.	Original broadcast date	Average audience share (Nielsen Korea)	
Ep.	Original broadcast date	Nationwide	Seoul
1	February 15, 2023	3.098% (2nd)	3.407% (2nd)
2	February 16, 2023	2.017% (2nd)	2.486% (2nd)
3	February 22, 2023	1.975% (3rd)	2.251% (3rd)
4	February 23, 2023	1.622% (4th)	1.890% (4th)
5	March 1, 2023	2.121% (4th)	2.489% (3rd)
6	March 2, 2023	1.432% (4th)	1.731% (4th)
7	March 8, 2023	1.943% (4th)	1.883% (5th)
8	March 9, 2023	1.296% (4th)	1.499% (4th)
9	March 15, 2023	1.882% (3rd)	2.246% (3rd)
10	March 16, 2023	1.369% (4th)	1.546% (4th)
11	March 22, 2023	1.712% (3rd)	1.663% (4th)
12	March 23, 2023	1.522% (4th)	1.949% (4th)
Average		1.832%	2.087%
In the table above, the blue numbers represent the lowest ratings and the red numbers represent the highest ratings.; This series aired on a cable channel/pay TV which normally has a relatively smaller audience compared to free-to-air TV/public broadcasters (KBS, SBS, MBC and EBS).
