= Check-in Hanyang =

2024–2025 South Korean television series

- Promotional poster
- Hangul: 체크인 한양
- RR: Chekeuin hanyang
- MR: Ch'ek'ŭin hanyang
- Genre: Historical; Romance; Coming-of-age
- Written by: Park Hyun-jin
- Directed by: Myeong Hyun-woo
- Starring: Bae In-hyuk; Kim Ji-eun; Jung Gun-joo; Park Jae-chan; Kim Eui-sung; Yoon Je-moon; Han Jae-suk; Kim Min-jung
- Music by: Kim Jong-cheon
- Country of origin: South Korea
- Original language: Korean
- No. of episodes: 16

Production
- Executive producers: Park Jong-eun (CP); Lee Chang-ah
- Producers: Kang Kyung-sik; Lee Hyun-wook; Kim Yeon-seong; Yoon Jeong-hwa; Song-a Chae; Faito Mori; Izumi Hasegawa; Sadakazu Kikuchi; Eiichi Murakami
- Running time: 70 minutes
- Production companies: WeMad; Raemongraein; Story Networks; Pony Canyon
- Budget: ₩15.9 billion

Original release
- Network: Channel A
- Release: December 21, 2024 – February 9, 2025

Check-in Hanyang (Korean: 체크인 한양) is a 2024–2025 South Korean television series written by Park Hyun-jin, directed by Myeong Hyun-woo, and starring Bae In-hyuk, Kim Ji-eun, Jung Gun-joo, Park Jae-chan, Kim Eui-sung, Yoon Je-moon, Han Jae-suk, and Kim Min-jung. The series delves into the lives of four young individuals who become interns at Yongcheonru, the most prestigious inn in Joseon. It aired on Channel A from December 21, 2024, to February 9, 2025, every Saturday and Sunday at 21:10 (KST). It is also available for streaming on TVING and Wavve in South Korea, and on Netflix and Viki in selected regions.

== Synopsis ==
The interns navigate the demanding environment of Yongcheonru, the most prestigious inn in Joseon, facing challenges from disgruntled guests, strict supervisors, and the inherent complexities of the inn's operations. Prince Lee Eun, despite his attempts at anonymity, finds his royal lineage constantly drawing unwanted attention. He must carefully conceal his identity while navigating the social and political undercurrents of Joseon. Hong Deok-soo excels in posing as a man, impressing her superiors with her intelligence and dedication. However, she grapples with the constant fear of exposure and the limitations imposed upon women in Joseon. Cheon Jun-hwa, initially resistant, gradually finds himself drawn to the challenges of the inn and the camaraderie he develops with his fellow interns. He begins to question his pre-conceived notions and find a new sense of purpose. And Ko Soo-ra, driven by ambition, excels in his duties, earning the respect of his superiors. However, his single-minded focus begins to strain his relationships and cloud his judgment.

== Cast and characters ==
=== Main ===
- Bae In-hyuk as Prince Mu Yeong / Lee Eun-ho / Lee Eun

A prince who hides his identity and disguise as a commoner intern.

- Kim Ji-eun as Hong Deok-soo/ Hong Jae-on

A woman who disguise as a man to become a general manager at Yongcheonru.

- Jung Gun-joo as Cheon Jun-hwa

The heir to Yongcheonru who is forced as an intern by his father.

- Park Jae-chan as Ko Soo-ra

An intern at Yongcheonru who seeks to restore his family's honor.

=== Supporting ===
- Lee Ho-won
- Han Jae-suk

=== Special appearance ===
- Kim Min-jung as Seol Mae-hwa
  The innkeeper of Yongcheonru

== Production ==
=== Development ===
On August 29, 2024, Channel A and Japanese content production company Pony Canyon signed a business agreement for the joint production of the Check-in Hanyang at the Dong-a Media Center in Jongno District, Seoul. The series is written by Park Hyun-jin, directed by Myeong Hyun-woo, planned by Channel A, and co-produced by Wemad Co., Raemongraein, and Story Networks.

=== Casting ===
On April 26, 2024, Bae In-hyuk, Kim Ji-eun, Jung Gun-joo, and Park Jae-chan were confirmed as the main characters. SPOTV News reported on May 28 that Han Jae-suk would appear in the series. On June 13, it was reported that Kim Min-jung would make a special appearance. On June 24, Lee Ho-won's agency reported that he would appear in the series.

== Release ==
In August 2024, Channel A announced that Check-in Hanyang would be broadcast in December. In November 2024, it was confirmed to premiere on December 21, and would air every Saturday and Sunday at 19:50 (KST). It was also confirmed to be available for streaming on TVING and Wavve in South Korea, and Netflix and Viki in selected regions.

== Viewership ==
Check-in Hanyang : South Korea viewers per episode (thousands)

| Season | Episode number | | | | | | | | | | | | | | | |
| Season | 1 | 2 | 3 | 4 | 5 | 6 | 7 | 8 | 9 | 10 | 11 | 12 | 13 | 14 | 15 | 16 |
|---|---|---|---|---|---|---|---|---|---|---|---|---|---|---|---|---|
| 1 | N/A | 562 | 507 | 694 | 485 | 608 | 544 | 616 | 540 | 652 | 510 | 691 | 465 | 760 | 528 | 886 |

Source: Audience measurement performed nationwide by Nielsen Korea.

Average TV viewership ratings
| Ep. | Original broadcast date | Average audience share (Nielsen Korea) | |
| Ep. | Original broadcast date | Nationwide | Seoul |
|---|---|---|---|
| 1 | December 21, 2024 | 1.816% (16th) | 2.007% (10th) |
| 2 | December 22, 2024 | 2.703% (8th) | 2.468% (5th) |
| 3 | December 28, 2024 | 2.162% (11th) | 2.135% (7th) |
| 4 | December 29, 2024 | 3.018% (2nd) | 3.024% (2nd) |
| 5 | January 4, 2025 | 2.020% (7th) | 1.998% (6th) |
| 6 | January 5, 2025 | 2.665% (9th) | 2.740% (6th) |
| 7 | January 11, 2025 | 2.307% (10th) | 2.524% (8th) |
| 8 | January 12, 2025 | 2.630% (5th) | 2.635% (5th) |
| 9 | January 18, 2025 | 2.458% (7th) | 2.735% (4th) |
| 10 | January 19, 2025 | 3.023% (6th) | 3.031% (5th) |
| 11 | January 25, 2025 | 2.262% (11th) | 2.352% (6th) |
| 12 | January 26, 2025 | 3.111% (6th) | 2.956% (3rd) |
| 13 | February 1, 2025 | 2.1% (11th) | 2.072% (9th) |
| 14 | February 2, 2025 | 3.531% (1st) | 3.626% (1st) |
| 15 | February 8, 2025 | 2.609% (6th) | 2.720% (2nd) |
| 16 | February 9, 2025 | 4.156% (1st) | 4.022% (1st) |
| Average | | 2.661% | 2.566% |
In the table above, the blue numbers represent the lowest ratings and the red numbers represent the highest ratings.; This drama aired on a cable channel/pay TV which normally has a relatively smaller audience compared to free-to-air TV/public broadcasters (KBS, SBS, MBC, and EBS).
