= Trainee =

Individual taking part in a trainee program

A trainee is commonly known as an individual taking part in a trainee program within an organization after having graduated from technical and higher courses.

A trainee is an official employee of the firm that is being trained to the job they were originally hired for. Literally, a trainee is an employee in training. Trainee programs are arranged by private companies and public sector employers where the trainee position has a varied duration depending on the company's program. During the duration of these programs, the trainee is expected to receive a salary as well as is expected to have full-time employment awaiting in the company when the program is over. Often used as an insurance measure by companies, firms typically will have a trainee period where the person is still being evaluated after which an official decision to hire on a permanent basis is made.

The trainee programs most often consist of a combination of theory and practice and are aimed at having the trainee to learn the company from the ground up. Many trainees are able to take advantage of their contact network from the trainee program and climb the corporate ladder and become key individuals in many companies.

Many companies around the world organize trainee programs.

== See also ==
- Apprenticeship
- Internship
- School-to-work transition
