= Our Sticky Love =

2026 South Korean television series

- Promotional poster
- Hangul: 이런 엿 같은 사랑
- Lit.: This Damn Love
- RR: Ireon yeot gateun sarang
- MR: Irŏn yŏt kat'ŭn sarang
- Genre: Romantic comedy
- Written by: Mo Ji-hye
- Directed by: Kim Jang-han
- Starring: Jung Hae-in; Ha Young
- Music by: Noh Young-shim
- Country of origin: South Korea
- Original language: Korean
- No. of episodes: 12

Production
- Running time: 51–67 minutes
- Production company: Studio S

Original release
- Network: Netflix
- Release: August 7, 2026

Our Sticky Love (Korean: 이런 엿 같은 사랑) is a 2026 South Korean romantic comedy television series written by Mo Ji-hye and directed by Kim Jang-han. The series follows Go Eun-sae (Ha Young), a prosecutor with amnesia who goes into hiding with Jang Tae-ha (Jung Hae-in), a former boxer turned gang member after he lies about being her boyfriend to protect her from a crime syndicate. It was released on Netflix on August 7, 2026.

== Plot ==
While tracking a South Korean crime syndicate led by a powerful boss, prosecutor Go Eun-sae is involved in an incident that leaves her with retrograde amnesia. She subsequently encounters Jang Tae-ha, a former youth boxing champion turned gang member who is working as a small-town coach. Tae-ha recognizes Eun-sae as his first love, but because she has no recollection of her past, he claims to be her boyfriend to protect her, leading the two to move in together.

== Cast and characters ==
=== Main ===
- Jung Hae-in as Jang Tae-ha, a former youth boxing champion and gang member currently working as a small-town boxing coach
- Ha Young as Go Eun-sae, a prosecutor who suffers from amnesia

=== Gangsters ===
- Heo Sung-tae as Baek Sang-gil
- Eun Jong-gun as Kyung-pyo
- Lee Kug-young as Lee Chang

=== Taffy Village ===
- Kim Young-ok as Go Young-hong, Tae-ha's grandmother
- Jeon Bae-soo as Hong Do-yeop
- Seo Jeong-yeon as Do Jeong-hwa
- Jang Hye-jin as Paeng Hui-ja, a village woman
- Cha Chung-hwa as Jo Maeng-suk, a village woman
- Kim Mi-hwa as Na Geum-hyang, village woman
- Lee Jae-won as Ahn Ki-joon, Eun-sae's attending physician
- Jeong Soon-won as Kim Gang-rok
- Yang Jo-ah as Kim Song-wol
- Moon Seong-hyun as Kim Pil-seung
- Lee Su-ho as Jun-sik

=== Special appearance ===
- Lee Jun-young as Kaito

== Production ==
=== Development ===
The series is written by screenwriter Mo Ji-hye and directed by Kim Jang-han, who helmed Do You Like Brahms? (2020) and My Demon (2023–2024). This marks the second collaboration between Mo and Kim, who previously worked together on the 2021 Wavve original series You Raise Me Up. It is produced by Studio S, and was later picked up by Netflix as an original series under the English title Lovestuck, then changed to Our Sticky Love after Netflix unveiled their 2026 Korean content lineup. The Korean title Ireon yeot gateun sarang (Korean: 이런 엿 같은 사랑) literally translates to "This love is like yeot" (a traditional sticky confectionery), where yeot is simultaneously a slang term for "Fucked up".

=== Casting ===
In February 2025, OSEN reported that Jung Hae-in and Ha Young were positively reviewing offers for the leading roles. Their respective agencies confirmed they had received the script and were considering the project before both officially signed on. Later, SPOTV News reported that Heo Sung-tae joined the cast to play a powerful crime syndicate boss, acting as a core anchor for the show's conflict while Lee Jun-young would make a special appearance. In May 2026, Newsen reported that Lee Jae-won was cast.

=== Filming ===
Principal photography began on April 10, 2025, with filming taking place at several landmarks in Dangjin, including Myeoncheon Goljeongji Pond, the Sunseong Cherry Blossom Trail, and the Ami Art Museum.

== Release ==
Netflix initially confirmed that Our Sticky Love was scheduled for a third quarter of 2026 release window as part of its annual Korean content lineup. By July 2026, the series is scheduled to be released on August 7.
