= Hong Bi-ra =

South Korean actress

- Born: September 14, 1996 (age 29); South Korea
- Occupation: Actress
- Years active: 2017–present
- Agent: Awesome ENT

Korean name
- Hangul: 홍비라
- Hanja: 洪妃羅
- RR: Hong Bira
- MR: Hong Pira
- Website: awesomeent.co.kr

Hong Bi-ra (Korean: 홍비라; born September 14, 1996) is a South Korean actress. She is known for her roles in Beautiful Vampire (2018), Again My Life (2022) and The Good Bad Mother (2023).

== Filmography ==
=== Film ===
Year	Title	Role	Ref.
2018	Beautiful Vampire	Hwang Jin-yi	

=== Television series ===
Year	Title	Role	Ref.
2022	Again My Life	Kim Kyu-ri	
2023	The Good Bad Mother	Oh Ha-young	
2024	The Tale of Lady Ok	Lady Lee	
2026	The Scarecrow	Kim Hee-jin	

=== Web series ===
Year	Title	Role	Ref.
2018	Luv Pub	Yoo Ga-young	
2019	22 Flower Road	Bae Ga-yoon	
2020	Hanging On	Alice Kim	
