= The Long Shot Trial =

Upcoming South Korean television series

- Hangul: 승산 있습니다
- Hanja: 勝算 있습니다
- Lit.: There Is a Chance of Winning
- RR: Seungsan itseumnida
- MR: Sŭngsan issŭmnida
- Genre: Legal drama; Comedy
- Based on: TV Asahi's Legal V: Ex-Lawyer Shoko Takanashi
- Written by: Jung Jin-young; Kim Eui-chan
- Directed by: Kwon Da-som
- Starring: Lee Je-hoon; Ha Young
- Country of origin: South Korea
- Original language: Korean

Production
- Production companies: Studio S; Artist Studio

Original release
- Network: SBS TV

The Long Shot Trial (Korean: 승산 있습니다) is an upcoming South Korean legal comedy television series written by Jung Jin-young and Kim Eui-chan, directed by Kwon Da-som, and starring Lee Je-hoon and Ha Young. Based on the Japanese TV Asahi's drama Legal V: Ex-Lawyer Shoko Takanashi, the series centers on a disbarred former lawyer, who establishes a law firm with rookie attorneys and paralegals, including a rookie lawyer with strong legal knowledge but no courtroom experience. The firm takes on difficult cases against a major rival firm.

Originally scheduled to be released on SBS TV in February 2027, SBS temporarily postponed the release of the series due to the allegations involving Ha Young’s great-grandfather.

== Synopsis ==
Kwon Baek is a former lawyer. After being disbarred due to a bribery scandal, he disappeared and later established Seungsan, where he works as the office manager. He sets traps to uncover the truth and stages theatrical shows.

== Cast and characters ==
=== Main ===
- Lee Je-hoon as Kwon Baek
- Ha Young as Yeo Sim-hee

=== Supporting ===
- Ok Ja-yeon
- Lee Jae-won
- Jo Sung-ha
- Go Woo-jin as Dong-ho

=== Special appearances ===
- Jeon Mi-do

== Production ==
=== Development ===
The Long Shot Trial is based on the Japanese TV Asahi's drama Legal V: Ex-Lawyer Shoko Takanashi, produced jointly by Studio S and Artist Studio, directed by Kwon Da-som, who helmed My Demon (2023–2024), and the screenplay is co-written by Jung Jin-young, who penned Silence Warning, and Kim Eui-chan. The series is a comedic legal drama about a law firm led by Kwon Baek, a former lawyer turned office manager, who wins impossible cases with unorthodox methods.

=== Casting ===
In February 2026, Lee Je-hoon and Ha Young were confirmed to lead the series, with Ok Ja-yeon, Lee Jae-won, Jo Sung-ha, and Go Woo-jin joining the supporting cast.

=== Filming ===
Principal photography commenced in March 2026, and concluded on September 3, 2026.

On August 13, 2026, following controversy over her great-grandfather's pro-Japanese activities, Ha Young halted filming and returned to set on August 20.

== Release ==
The Long Shot Trial was scheduled to premiere on SBS TV on February 26, 2027.
