= The Trauma Code: Heroes on Call =

2025 South Korean television series

- Promotional poster
- Hangul: 중증외상센터
- Hanja: 重症外傷센터
- Lit.: Severe Trauma Center
- RR: Jungjeung oesang senteo
- MR: Chungchŭng oesang sent'ŏ
- Genre: Medical; Comedy
- Based on: Trauma Center: Golden Hour by: Hansanleega; Hongbichira
- Written by: Choi Tae-kang
- Directed by: Lee Do-yoon
- Starring: Ju Ji-hoon; Choo Young-woo; Ha Young; Yoon Kyung-ho; Jung Jae-kwang
- Music by: Primary
- Country of origin: South Korea
- Original language: Korean
- No. of episodes: 8

Production
- Executive producers: Kwon Mi-kyung; Park Mae-hee; Jeon Pil-do
- Producer: Jo Soo-jin
- Cinematography: Choi Sang-mook
- Editor: Park Min-sun
- Running time: 47–55 minutes
- Production companies: Studio N; Mays Entertainment

Original release
- Network: Netflix
- Release: January 24, 2025

The Trauma Code: Heroes on Call (Korean: 중증외상센터) is a 2025 South Korean medical comedy television series written by Choi Tae-kang, directed by Lee Do-yoon, and starring Ju Ji-hoon, Choo Young-woo, Ha Young, Yoon Kyung-ho and Jung Jae-kwang. It is based on the web novel Trauma Center: Golden Hour by Hansanleega and Hongbichira, which was serialized into a Naver Webtoon in 2019. The series follows the journey of Baek Kang-hyuk, a brilliant trauma surgeon who joins a struggling university hospital. It was released on Netflix on January 24, 2025.

Following the global streaming success of its first season, Netflix officially announced the simultaneous renewal and production confirmation for both Season 2 and Season 3 in October 2026.

== Synopsis ==
Baek Kang-hyuk arrives at a university hospital where the trauma team is struggling to keep up. His arrival shakes things up as he possesses exceptional surgical skills honed through experience in conflict zones worldwide. His unorthodox methods and unshakable confidence initially create friction with the established team. Little by little, he earns their respect and guides them in developing into a leading trauma unit.

== Cast and characters ==
=== Main ===
- Ju Ji-hoon as Baek Kang-hyuk

A genius trauma surgeon and ex-mercenary combat medic who becomes the director of the Trauma Unit that became a Trauma Center at Hankuk National University Hospital.

- Choo Young-woo as Yang Jae-won

A fellow who becomes Kang-hyuk's first disciple. He is smart and pacifist who cannot lie. He is also a top scholar student for whole semester in medical school and the only son of a third-generation doctor family.

- Ha Young as Cheon Jang-mi

A nurse with five years of experience in the Trauma Unit at Hankuk National University Hospital.

- Yoon Kyung-ho as Han Yu-rim

A proctologist and the head of general surgery and colorectal surgery who watches Kang-hyuk closely after losing his protégé, Jae-won.

- Jung Jae-kwang as Park Gyeong-won

A resident who takes on difficult surgeries in the anesthesiology department right before his specialist exam.

=== Supporting ===
- Kim Eui-sung as Choi Jo-eun

Director of Hankuk National University Hospital.

- Kim Won-hae as Hong Jae-hun

Director of Planning and Coordination of Hankuk National University Hospital.

- Kim Sun-young as Kang Myeong-hui

Minister of Ministry of Health and Welfare.

- Park Ye-ni as Agnes Song
- Hong Woo-jin as An Jung-heon

Team leader of 119 Air Rescue Unit.

- Min Young as Ma Tae-rim
- Jang Sung-yoon as Nurse Kim
- Park Jung-yoon as Han Ji-young

Han Yu-rim's daughter.

- Kim Youn-jeong as Nurse Hong
- Kim Chung-gil as Hwang Seon-u

An anesthesiologist.

- Lee Jung-in as Joo Hyung-wook

A fellow at Hepatobiliary and Pancreatic Department who has been with Jae-won since their resident years.

- Jo Jae-young as an emergency medical resident
- Oh Jung-woo as an emergency medical intern
- Bang You-in as Nurse Bang
- Park Gwan-woo as an emergency room nurse 1
- Jang Yoo-jung as an emergency room nurse 2
- Kwon Hye-min as an emergency room nurse 3
- Jo Hoon as a helicopter crew
- Lee Geun-hoo as a helicopter pilot
- Kim Seo-joon as a helicopter co-pilot

=== Special appearance ===
- Kim Jae-won as Seo Dong-ju

A military doctor.

== Episodes ==
| No. | Title | Directed by | Written by | Original release date |
|---|---|---|---|---|
| 1 | "Enter Doctor Maniac"; Transliteration: "Anjeonpini ppopin ttorai" (Korean: 안전핀이 뽑힌 또라이) | Lee Do-yoon | Choi Tae-kang | January 24, 2025 |
| 2 | "The Birth of Protégé No.1"; Transliteration: "1houi tansaeng" (Korean: 1호의 탄생) | Lee Do-yoon | Choi Tae-kang | January 24, 2025 |
| 3 | "Keep on Running"; Transliteration: "Urin gyesong ttwieoya handa" (Korean: 우린 계속 뛰어야 한다) | Lee Do-yoon | Choi Tae-kang | January 24, 2025 |
| 4 | "Closer Than You Think"; Transliteration: "Boineun geotboda deo gakkai" (Korean: 보이는 것보다 더 가까이) | Lee Do-yoon | Choi Tae-kang | January 24, 2025 |
| 5 | "Code Black"; Transliteration: "Kodeu beullaek" (Korean: 코드 블랙) | Lee Do-yoon | Choi Tae-kang | January 24, 2025 |
| 6 | "Reasons for Not Giving Up"; Transliteration: "Pogihaji aneul namanui iyu" (Korean: 포기하지 않을 나만의 이유) | Lee Do-yoon | Choi Tae-kang | January 24, 2025 |
| 7 | "SOS from South Sudan"; Transliteration: "Namsudaneseo on gujo sinho" (Korean: 남수단에서 온 구조 신호) | Lee Do-yoon | Choi Tae-kang | January 24, 2025 |
| 8 | "Patient: Baek Kang-hyuk"; Transliteration: "Hwanjamyeong: baekganghyeok" (Korean: 환자명: 백강혁) | Lee Do-yoon | Choi Tae-kang | January 24, 2025 |

== Production ==
=== Development ===
In 2022, Lee Nak-jun, also known by his pen name Hansanleega, an otolaryngologist, YouTuber and web novel writer, appeared as a guest on the February 7 episode of KBS Cool FM's Park Myung-soo's Radio Show. He stated that they already signed a contract for the drama rights of his web novel Trauma Center: Golden Hour and thought of Gong Yoo and Kim Nam-gil to star in the series. In September 2024, the web novel has recently been decided to be made into a drama and was developed under the working title Severe Trauma Center: Golden Hour (Korean: 중증외상센터: 골든 아워). The series is written by Choi Tae-kang, directed by Lee Do-yoon, and produced by Studio N and Mays Entertainment.

=== Casting ===
In September 2022, Ju Ji-hoon was considered to be the lead actor of the series. In January 2023, Ju's agency Blitzway Studios confirmed that they received the offer and are reviewing it. In April 2023, Choo Young-woo has been cast and his agency, J,Wide-Company stated that he considered to appear. The cast lineup namely Ju, Choo, Yoon Kyung-ho, Ha Young, and Jung Jae-kwang were revealed in June 2023.

On September 1, 2026, Ha Young stepped down from the upcoming seasons following controversy surrounding her great-grandfather's activities during the Japanese colonial period. On September 29, it was announced that Jeong Ye-in would take over the role of Cheon Jang-mi.

== Release ==
According to Ize report on December 20, 2024, The Trauma Code: Heroes on Call would schedule to be released on January 24, 2025, but on December 23, Netflix Korea posted a list of titles scheduled to be released in January 2025 on their official social media accounts and the series was listed under coming soon. Two weeks later, Netflix officially confirmed the release date.

== Reception ==
=== Critical response ===
Pierce Conran of South China Morning Post rated the series four out of five and praised Ju Ji-hoon's acting, "central to the show's success is Ju, who has seldom been better as the picture-perfect Baek Kang-hyuk, an enormously attractive role that complements his strong points." He added that "The Trauma Code: Heroes on Call is a show that takes the medical action drama formula honed by shows like Dr. Romantic and both pares it down and amps it up. The characters are simpler, as is the drama, with the focus squarely on scratching viewers' itch for heroic highs."

=== Viewership ===
The word-of-mouth success of The Trauma Code: Heroes on Call is reflected in its numbers. From January 27 to February 2, the show recorded 11.9 million views (calculated by dividing total watch hours by the runtime), reaching the first place of Netflix's global non-English TV rankings just 10 days after its release. The series topped the charts in 17 countries, including Korea, Thailand, Taiwan, Malaysia, Chile and Peru, and entered the Top 10 in 63 countries, including New Zealand, France, Italy, Mexico, Brazil, India, Japan and Egypt. According to Good Data Corporation, a Korean content analytics firm, the show's buzz surged by 140 percent compared to the previous week, making it 2.5 times more talked about than Squid Game season 2.

=== Accolades ===
| Award ceremony | Year | Category | Nominee | Result | Ref. |
|---|---|---|---|---|---|
| APAN Star Awards | 2025 | Best Director | Lee Do-yoon | Nominated | |
| APAN Star Awards | 2025 | Top Excellence Award, Actor in a Miniseries | Ju Ji-hoon | Nominated | |
| APAN Star Awards | 2025 | Excellence Award, Actor in a Miniseries | Choo Young-woo | Nominated | |
| APAN Star Awards | 2025 | Excellence Acting Award, Actor | Yoon Kyung-ho | Won | |
| APAN Star Awards | 2025 | Best New Actress | Ha Young | Won | |
| Baeksang Arts Awards | 2025 | Best Drama | The Trauma Code: Heroes on Call | Nominated | |
| Baeksang Arts Awards | 2025 | Best Director | Lee Do-yoon | Nominated | |
| Baeksang Arts Awards | 2025 | Best Actor | Ju Ji-hoon | Won | |
| Baeksang Arts Awards | 2025 | Best Supporting Actor | Yoon Kyung-ho | Nominated | |
| Baeksang Arts Awards | 2025 | Best New Actress | Ha Young | Nominated | |
| Blue Dragon Series Awards | 2025 | Best Drama | The Trauma Code: Heroes on Call | Won | |
| Blue Dragon Series Awards | 2025 | Best Actor | Ju Ji-hoon | Won | |
| Blue Dragon Series Awards | 2025 | Best Supporting Actor | Yoon Kyung-ho | Nominated | |
| Blue Dragon Series Awards | 2025 | Best New Actor | Choo Young-woo | Won | |
| Blue Dragon Series Awards | 2025 | Best New Actress | Ha Young | Nominated | |
| Global OTT Awards | 2025 | Best Lead Actor | Ju Ji-hoon | Nominated | |
| Global OTT Awards | 2025 | Best Newcomer Actor | Choo Young-woo | Nominated | |
| Seoul International Drama Awards | 2025 | Outstanding Korean Drama | The Trauma Code: Heroes on Call | Won (Note: Tied with When Life Gives You Tangerines) | |
| Seoul International Drama Awards | 2025 | Outstanding Korean Actor | Ju Ji-hoon | Won | |
