= Trolley (TV series) =

2022 South Korea television series

- Promotional poster
- Hangul: 트롤리
- RR: Teurolli
- MR: T'ŭrolli
- Genre: Mystery; Melodrama
- Written by: Ryu Bo-ri
- Directed by: Kim Mun-kyo
- Starring: Kim Hyun-joo; Park Hee-soon
- Music by: Kim Jun-seok; Jeong Se-rin
- Country of origin: South Korea
- Original language: Korean
- No. of episodes: 16

Production
- Executive producer: Lee Kwang-soon
- Producer: Han Jeong-hwan
- Running time: 60 minutes
- Production company: Studio S

Original release
- Network: SBS TV
- Release: December 19, 2022 – February 14, 2023

Trolley (Korean: 트롤리) is a 2023 South Korean television series starring Kim Hyun-joo and Park Hee-soon. It premiered on SBS TV on December 19, 2022, and aired every Monday and Tuesday at 22:00 (KST). It is also available for streaming on Netflix in selected regions.

== Synopsis ==
Trolley tells the story of the wife of a member of the National Assembly who lives quietly while hiding a secret from her past, and the dilemmas that ensue as her secrets are revealed to the world.

== Cast ==
=== Main ===
- Kim Hyun-joo as Kim Hye-joo/ Kim Jae-eun
  - Jung Yi-joo as young Kim Hye-joo/ Kim Jae-eun

The wife of a member of the National Assembly. She runs a book repair shop.

- Park Hee-soon as Nam Joong-do
  - Kim Soo-oh as young Nam Joong-do

A promising member of the National Assembly.

- Kim Mu-yeol as Jang Woo-jae

Nam Joong-do's senior assistant, whom he trusts most.

- Chung Su-bin as Kim Soo-bin

She lives in a group home due to her parents' divorce.

=== Supporting ===
==== Kim Hye-joo's Family ====
- Seo Jeong-yeon as Hyun Yeo-jin

Kim Hye-joo's close friend

- Choi Myung-bin as Nam Yoon-seo

Nam Joong-do and Kim Hye-joo's daughter.

==== Nam Joong-do's Aides ====
- Yoon Sa-bong as Kim Bit-na

A person who entered the National Council as a 9th-grade executive secretary and advanced to 5th-grade.

- Jeong Soon-won as Go Min-seok

Assistant to Nam Joong-do.

- Choi Soo-im as Choi Ja-young

Recent college graduate who applied to be Nam Joong-do's 9th-grade administrative secretary.

==== Youngsan People ====
- Ryu Hyun-kyung as Jin Seung-hee
  - Oh Yu-jin as young Jin Seung-hee

Kim Hye-joo's high school friend and the wife of a politician.

- Ki Tae-young as Choi Ki-young
  - Kim Il-ji as young Choi Ki-young

Jin Seung-hee's husband.

==== National Assembly ====
- Kim Mi-kyung as Woo Jin-seok

A former judge and now her party's leader in the National Assembly.

==== Others ====
- Lim Chul-hyung as Seung-gyu's father
- Jung Taek-hyun as Nam Ji-hoon

Nam Joong-do's deceased son.

- Won Mi-won as Cho Gwi-soon
- Gil Hae-yeon as Lee Yoo-shin
- Jang Gwang as Kang Soon-hong
- Lee Min-jae as Jin Seung-ho

Younger brother. Twins of Jin Seung-hee.

- Bae Hae-sun as Su-bin's mother
- Oh Min-ae as Welfare center staff of senior citizens
- Kim Gyun-ha

== Production ==
=== Casting ===
Actress Kim Sae-ron was initially confirmed to play the role of Kim Soo-bin, but on May 19, 2022, she withdrew from the series following a DUI incident. On September 7, 2022, it was confirmed that Chung Su-bin would play Kim Soo-bin.

=== Premiere ===
On September 7, it was confirmed that the series would air in December 2022.

== Viewership ==
Trolley : South Korea viewers per episode (thousands)

Season	Episode number																Average
Season	1	2	3	4	5	6	7	8	9	10	11	12	13	14	15	16	Average
1	795	728	N/A	620	N/A	N/A	756	624	719	625	N/A	551	N/A	659	749	716	N/A

Source: Audience measurement performed nationwide by Nielsen Korea.

Average TV viewership ratings
Ep.	Original broadcast date	Average audience share		
Ep.	Original broadcast date	Nielsen Korea		TNmS
Ep.	Original broadcast date	Nationwide	Seoul	Nationwide
1	December 19, 2022	4.6% (19th)	4.7% (NR)	4.8% (20th)
2	December 20, 2022	4.5% (15th)	5.1% (9th)	N/A
3	December 26, 2022	3.8% (21st)	4.0% (18th)	N/A
4	December 27, 2022	3.6% (18th)	3.9% (18th)	N/A
5	January 2, 2023	3.9% (20th)	4.7% (15th)	N/A
6	January 3, 2023	3.5% (20th)	4.2% (15th)	N/A
7	January 9, 2023	4.2% (17th)	4.9% (13th)	4.3% (16th)
8	January 10, 2023	3.7% (18th)	4.0% (16th)	N/A
9	January 16, 2023	4.4% (17th)	4.9% (14th)	3.8% (20th)
10	January 17, 2023	3.3% (20th)	3.3% (20th)	N/A
11	January 30, 2023 (Note: Originally scheduled to air on January 23–24, 2023, the broadcast of episodes 11 and 12 was postponed to January 30 and 31 due to Lunar New Year holiday.)	3.3% (22nd)	3.7% (18th)	N/A
12	January 31, 2023	3.5% (19th)	3.9% (17th)	3.5% (20th)
13	February 6, 2023	3.6% (21st)	4.3% (15th)	N/A
14	February 7, 2023	3.6% (18th)	3.9% (15th)	3.5% (19th)
15	February 13, 2023	4.2% (16th)	4.7% (13th)	3.7% (19th)
16	February 14, 2023	4.2% (15th)	4.7% (8th)	3.9% (17th)
Average		3.9%	4.3%	— (Note: Due to some ratings not recorded, the exact average rating is unknown.)
In the table above, the blue numbers represent the lowest ratings and the red numbers represent the highest ratings.; N/A denotes that the ratings were not known.

== Awards and nominations ==
Name of the award ceremony, year presented, category, nominee of the award, and the result of the nomination
Award ceremony	Year	Category	Nominee / Work	Result	Ref.
SBS Drama Awards	2023	Best New Actress	Chung Su-bin	Won	
SBS Drama Awards	2023	Best Supporting Actress in a Miniseries Romance/Comedy Drama	Seo Jeong-yeon	Won	
SBS Drama Awards	2023	Best Supporting Actor in a Miniseries Romance/Comedy Drama	Jung Soon-won	Won	
SBS Drama Awards	2023	Top Excellence Award, Actor in a Miniseries Romance/Comedy Drama	Park Hee-soon	Nominated	
SBS Drama Awards	2023	Top Excellence Award, Actor in a Miniseries Romance/Comedy Drama	Kim Mu-yeol	Nominated	
SBS Drama Awards	2023	Top Excellence Award, Actress in a Miniseries Romance/Comedy Drama	Kim Hyun-joo	Nominated	
SBS Drama Awards	2023	Best Young Actress	Choi Myung-bin	Nominated	
