= Ha Young (actress) =

South Korean actress (born 1993)

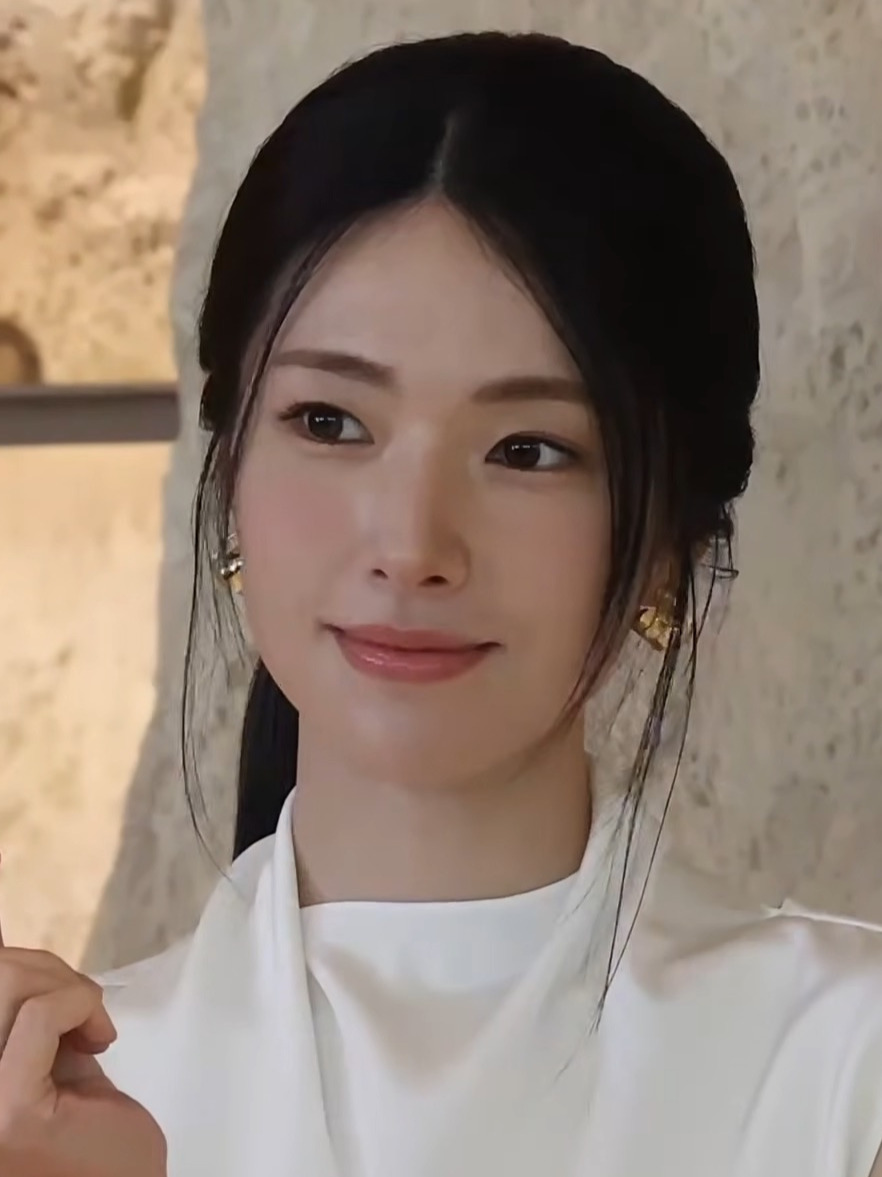
- Ha Young in 2026
- Born: Ahn Ha-young; August 11, 1993 (age 33); Seoul, South Korea
- Education: Ewha Womans University (Western Painting)
- Occupations: Actress; model
- Years active: 2018–present
- Agent: Bistus
- Relatives: Ahn Sang-ho (great-grandfather)

Korean name
- Hangul: 안하영
- RR: An Hayeong
- MR: An Hayŏng

Ahn Ha-young (Korean: 안하영; born August 11, 1993), known mononymously as Ha Young, is a South Korean actress and model. She is best known for her role in the series The Trauma Code: Heroes on Call (2025) and Our Sticky Love (2026).

== Early life and career ==
Ahn was born on August 11, 1993, in Seoul, South Korea. She comes from a family of four generations of physicians. Her great-grandfather, Ahn Sang-ho, opened the first hospital in Seoul under Emperor Gojong's rule. Her grandfather, Ahn Boo-ho, was a medical officer and professor who worked at Sorokdo National Hospital in the late 1940s and early 1950s. Her father and older sister are physicians as well.

Ahn majored in Western painting at Ewha Womans University and went on to graduate school at the School of Visual Arts in New York in 2016 to prepare for her master's degree; she took a leave of absence after one year to pursue an acting career.

After joining Bistus Entertainment and modelling for various brands, Ahn made her screen debut in the 2019 series Doctor Prisoner as Na Yi-hyeon, the protagonist's younger sister.

== Criticism of family background ==
In an August 7, 2026, appearance on Korean Broadcasting System's Problem Child in House, Ahn reportedly spoke "proudly" of her family's history in medicine and mentioned the achievements of her great-grandfather without naming him. Speculation began circulating online that her great-grandfather was Ahn Sang-ho, who has been described as a collaborator with Japanese imperial rule. He was a leader of a pro-Japanese Korean group and was used in the propaganda newspaper Maeil sinbo as an example of a Korean who had assimilated to become "indistinguishable from a Japanese person". Bistus Entertainment initially dismissed the speculation but later retracted the statement and apologized while acknowledging the familial tie. Ahn issued a personal apology, saying that she had "only partially known about her great-grandfather's life through stories told by her family".

During an August 21 meeting of the National Assembly’s Legislation and Judiciary Committee, Lawmaker Park Eun-jung of the Rebuilding Korea Party raised the question of whether the land owned by Ahn Sang-ho falls under the Special Law to Redeem Pro-Japanese Collaborators' Property, since he accumulated his wealth during the Japanese occupation.

In response to the controversy, Ahn stepped down from the upcoming seasons of the Netflix original series The Trauma Code: Heroes on Call. Netflix also refrained from uploading the second promotional video of her drama Our Sticky Love. The promotional videos Ahn filmed for Samsung Electronics and Artid were also made private.

== Filmography ==
Key
†	Denotes television productions that have not yet been released

Television performances
Year	Title	Role	Notes	Ref.
2019	Doctor Prisoner	Na Yi-hyeon		
2019–2020	Chocolate	Kim Hee-ju		
2020	Soul Mechanic	Kang Neu-ri		
2020	Love Is Annoying, but I Hate Being Lonely!	Jeon Bo-ra		
2020	Private Lives	Yoo Mi-young		
2020–2021	Royal Secret Agent	Kim Mi-ok		
2021	Mouse	Song Soo-jung		
2021–2022	Now, We Are Breaking Up	Jung So-young		
2021–2022	Let Me Be Your Knight	Chae Ji-yeon		
2022	Extraordinary Attorney Woo	Kim Hwa-young	Cameo (Episode 2)	
2022	The Good Detective	Jung Hee-joo	Season 2	
2023	Doona!	Kim Jin-joo		
2024	Face Me	Yoon Hye-jin		
2024	O'PENing 2024	Shin Seo-hyun	Episode: "My Trouble-Maker Mom"	
2025	The Trauma Code: Heroes on Call	Cheon Jang-mi	Season 1	
2026	Boyfriend on Demand	Lee Ji-yeon		
2026	Bloodhounds	Nurse Yoon	Season 2; Cameo	
2026	Teach You a Lesson	Choi Ga-yoon	Special appearances	
2026	Our Sticky Love	Go Eun-sae		
TBA	The Long Shot Trial †	Yeo Sim-hee		

== Awards and nominations ==
Name of the award ceremony, year presented, category, nominee of the award, and the result of the nomination
Award ceremony	Year	Category	Nominee / Work	Result	Ref.
APAN Star Awards	2025	Best New Actress	The Trauma Code: Heroes on Call	Won	
Baeksang Arts Awards	2025	Best New Actress – Television	The Trauma Code: Heroes on Call	Nominated	
Blue Dragon Series Awards	2025	Best New Actress	The Trauma Code: Heroes on Call	Nominated	
