= On Joo-wan =

South Korean actor

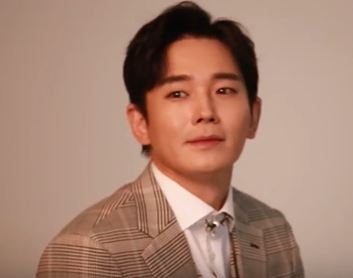
- On in 2019
- Born: Song Jeong-sik; December 11, 1983 (age 42); Daejeon, South Korea
- Other name: Ohn Ju-wan
- Education: Seoul Institute of the Arts - Broadcasting
- Occupation: Actor
- Years active: 2004–present
- Agent: Haewadal Entertainment
- Spouse: Bang Min-ah (m. 2025)

Korean name
- Hangul: 송정식
- Hanja: 宋正植
- RR: Song Jeongsik
- MR: Song Chŏngsik

Stage name
- Hangul: 온주완
- Hanja: 溫朱莞
- RR: On Juwan
- MR: On Chuwan

Song Jeong-sik (Korean: 송정식; born December 11, 1983), better known by his stage name On Joo-wan, is a South Korean actor. He won widespread praise for his leading role in the film The Peter Pan Formula, and also appeared in My Mighty Princess, 12 Signs of Love, and The Five.

== Personal life ==
On July 4, 2025, it was announced that On would marry his Beautiful Gong Shim co-star Bang Min-ah after dating for four years. The couple married on November 29, 2025, in Bali.

== Filmography ==
=== Film ===
Year	Title	Role	Notes	Ref.
2004	Flying Boys	Lee Chang-seob		
2005	The Aggressives	Jjaeng		
2005	The Peter Pan Formula	Kim Han-soo		
2006	If You Were Me 2	Employee	Segment: "Hey, Man!"	
2006	The City of Violence	Young Tae-su		
2006	Bloody Tie	Yoo Sung-geun		
2007	The Cut	Joong-suk		
2008	My Mighty Princess	Il-young		
2012	The Taste of Money	Yoon Chul/Charlie		
2012	Natural Burials – The Movie	Jung-hoon		
2013	The Five	Oh Jae-wook		
2014	Obsessed	Kyung Woo-jin		
2015	Remember You	Dong-gun		
2015	Time Renegades	Teacher Park		
2020	Honest Candidate	Kim Jun-young		
2022	Honest Candidate 2	Kim Jun-young	Special appearance	

=== Television series ===
Year	Title	Role	Notes	Ref.
2002	Rustic Period	Japanese student 1		
2005	That Summer's Typhoon	Han Ji-hoon		
2007	Chosun Police 1	Kim Kang-woo		
2011	My Love By My Side	Go Seok-bin		
2012	12 Signs of Love	Cha Jin-oh		
2012	Natural Burials	Jung-hoon		
2013	The Blade and Petal	Bojang of Goguryeo		
2014	Drama Special: "Illegal Parking"	Noh Jung-do		
2014	The Idle Mermaid	Lee Hyun-myung		
2014	Punch	Lee Ho-sung		
2015	The Time We Were Not in Love	Himself	Cameo; episode 2	
2015	The Village: Achiara's Secret	Seo Ki-hyun		
2016	Beautiful Gong Shim	Seok Joon-soo		
2017	Man in the Kitchen	Jung Tae-Yang		
2019	The Lies Within	Jin Young-min		
2021	The Penthouse: War in Life	Baek Joon-ki	Cameo (Season 2, episode 13); Series regular (Season 3)	
2023	Moon in the Day	Han Min-oh		

=== Television shows ===
Year	Title	Role	Notes	Ref.
2015–2016	Shaolin Clenched Fist	Fixed cast member as "#2"	Episodes 1–13	
2017	King of Mask Singer	Contestant as "Young Master, Shows a Bitter Taste"	Episodes 103–104	
2020	Sea Police 2	Main cast		
2021	Awesome Romance	Host		

=== Hosting ===
Year	Title	Notes	Ref.
2021	Korean Popular Culture and Arts Awards	with Jang Ye-won	

=== Radio shows ===
Year	Title	Role	Notes	Ref.
2008	Lee Juck's TenTen Club			

== Stage ==
=== Theatre ===
Year	Title	Role	Notes	Ref.
2016	Newsies	Jack Kelly		
2018–2019; 2020–2021	The Days	Kang Moo-young		
2022	Sandglass (모래시계)	Tae-soo		

== Awards and nominations ==
Name of the award ceremony, year presented, category, nominee of the award, and the result of the nomination
Award ceremony	Year	Category	Nominee / Work	Result	Ref.
Baeksang Arts Awards	2007	Best New Actor – Film	The Peter Pan Formula	Nominated	
Blue Dragon Film Awards	2006	Best New Actor	The Peter Pan Formula	Nominated	
Dubai International Film Festival	2006	Best Actor	The Peter Pan Formula	Won	
Golden Cinematography Awards	2007	Best New Actor	The Peter Pan Formula	Won	
Korea Drama Awards	2018	Excellence Award, Actor	Man in the Kitchen	Won	
Korean Film Awards	2006	Best New Actor	The Peter Pan Formula	Nominated	
MBC Drama Awards	2017	Excellence Award, Actor in a Weekend Drama	Man in the Kitchen	Nominated	
SBS Drama Awards	2016	Special Acting Award, Actor in a Romantic Comedy Drama	Beautiful Gong Shim	Won	
SBS Drama Awards	2021	Best Character Award, Actor	The Penthouse: War in Life 2 and 3	Nominated	
