= Man in the Kitchen =

2017 South Korean television series

- Promotional poster
- Hangul: 밥상 차리는 남자
- Lit.: Man Who Sets the Table
- RR: Bapsang charineun namja
- MR: Papsang ch'arinŭn namja
- Genre: Family; Romantic comedy; Soap opera
- Created by: Lee Jae-dong
- Written by: Park Hyun-joo
- Directed by: Joo Sung-woo
- Starring: Choi Soo-young; On Joo-wan; Seo Hyo-rim; Park Jin-woo
- Country of origin: South Korea
- Original language: Korean
- No. of episodes: 100 (Note: In order to circumvent Korean laws that prevent commercial breaks in the middle of an episode, two 75-minute episodes are being shown each night with a commercial break between the two.)

Production
- Executive producers: Son Gi-won; Oh Sung-min
- Production locations: South Korea; Guam
- Camera setup: Single-camera
- Running time: 75 min
- Production companies: Kim Jong-hak Production; GnG Productions

Original release
- Network: MBC TV
- Release: September 2, 2017 – March 18, 2018

Man in the Kitchen (Korean: 밥상 차리는 남자) is a 2017 South Korean television series starring Choi Soo-young, On Joo-wan, Seo Hyo-rim, and Park Jin-woo. The series aired on MBC every Saturday and Sunday from 8:45 p.m. to 10:00 p.m. (KST). It was then later changed to air 2 episodes every Sunday from 8:45 p.m. to 11:00 p.m. (KST) from November 12 onwards.

== Synopsis ==
Lee Roo-ri (Choi Soo-young) tries to get a job at big company, but she gives up. She doesn't have a good relationship with her strict father. Lee Roo-ri decides to travel to Guam to get away. There, she meets Jung Tae-yang (On Joo-wan) who goes by the YOLO motto. He wanders around the world and places priority on his happiness, but he also carries an emotional wound.

After she meets Jung Tae-yang, Lee Roo-ri experiences a turning point in her life.

== Cast ==
=== Main ===
- Choi Soo-young as Lee Roo-ri- the jobless daughter of Lee Shin-mo and Hong Young-hye. she went through a rough childhood because of Shin-mo, and later accepts a job offer to a food company
  - Choi Yoo-ri as young Lee Roo-ri
- On Joo-wan as Jung Tae-yang- the biological son of Kevin Miller, he's a smart but easily annoyed man. throughout the series, he finds more and more about his backstory
- Seo Hyo-rim as Ha Yeon-joo- the spoiled daughter of Yoon-Choon ok, who later gets into an on off relationship with Lee So-won
- Park Jin-woo as Lee So-won- Roo-ri's brother and Lee Shin-mo and Hong Young-hye's son. He was pampered by Shin-mo as a kid, and works as a doctor. He later gets into an on off relationship with Ha Yeon-joo
  - Moon Woo-jin as young Lee So-won

=== Supporting ===
==== Roo-ri's household ====
- Kim Kap-soo as Lee Shin-mo- the rich father of Roo-ri and So-won. he's a gruff, self centered, abusive man who pampers So-won and disregards Roo-ri as a waste. however, later throughout the series, he grows to become kinder and kinder, revealing that he had always cared for Roo-ri
- Kim Mi-sook as Hong Young-hye- the abused and worked out wife of Shin-mo. Shes constantly burned out due to Shin-mo, and later moves out and works at a mattress store
- Kim Soo-mi as Yang Choon-ok- the rich mother of Ha Yeon-joo. she constantly feels guilt of leaving her little brother at a train station while trying to escape their abusive mother

==== Tae-yang's household ====
- Lee Il-hwa as Jung Hwa-young- Taeyang's biological mother
- Shim Hyung-tak as Go Jung-do- Taeyang's step-father who works at a bakery
- Song Kang as Kim Woo-joo- Taeyang's step brother. he's constantly caring for Eun-byul
- Kim Ji-young as Go Eun-byul- Taeyang's step sister and Woo-joo's sister.
- Lee Jae-ryong as Kevin Miller- Taeyang's biological father and Choon-ok's brother. he went to the US after being left behind by Choon-ok at a train station, but later becomes the head of a foods company.

==== Extended ====
- Lee Kyu-jung as Jung Soo-mi
- Han Ki-woong as Hee-cheol
- Kim Hye-yoon as Jung Soo-ji
- Choi Su-rin as Susanna / Lee Kyeong-hwa
- Jo Mi-ryung as Choi Teresa
- Lee Jung-hyuk as Manager Kim
- Kim Ji-sook as Choi Sun-young
- Tae Hang-ho as Noh Ji-shim
- Lee Cheol-min as Kim Jin-ho
- Hong Seo-jun as Director Park
- Moon Seul-a as Nurse Choi
- Kim Moo-young as Kim Sung-tan
- Lee Si-eon as Bong Myung-tae

== Ratings ==
- In this table, The blue numbers represent the lowest ratings and the red numbers represent the highest ratings.

Episode #	Original broadcast date	Average audience share			
Episode #	Original broadcast date	TNmS Ratings		AGB Nielsen	
Episode #	Original broadcast date	Nationwide	Seoul National Capital Area	Nationwide	Seoul National Capital Area
1	September 2, 2017	7.7% (13th)	7.5% (11th)	8.6% (11th)	9.4% (8th)
2	September 3, 2017	8.1% (12th)	8.2% (11th)	9.8% (10th)	9.9% (10th)
3	September 9, 2017	6.1% (15th)	5.4% (19th)	5.9% (18th)	5.6% (18th)
4	September 10, 2017	8.3% (13th)	7.6% (14th)	8.8% (11th)	8.8% (10th)
5	September 16, 2017	7.5% (15th)	7.0% (14th)	6.2% (18th)	5.6% (20th)
6	September 17, 2017	9.2% (7th)	8.0% (10th)	9.6% (7th)	9.6% (7th)
7	September 23, 2017	7.1% (14th)	6.7% (10th)	6.5% (15th)	6.0% (14th)
8	September 24, 2017	10.1% (6th)	9.6% (8th)	9.8% (7th)	9.2% (8th)
9	September 30, 2017	7.7% (14th)	7.2% (12th)	7.6% (12th)	7.4% (12th)
10	October 1, 2017	9.6% (7th)	8.7% (7th)	9.9% (9th)	9.6% (9th)
11	October 7, 2017	6.6% (14th)	5.9% (14th)	7.3% (13th)	7.0% (14th)
12	October 8, 2017	8.8% (8th)	8.0% (10th)	9.7% (8th)	9.3% (9th)
13	October 14, 2017	7.8% (12th)	6.3% (15th)	7.4% (12th)	6.8% (14th)
14	October 15, 2017	9.7% (7th)	8.4% (8th)	9.9% (8th)	9.1% (9th)
15	October 21, 2017 (Note: Shown back-to-back on October 21, due to the airing of a special movie One Step on October 22.)	10.5% (3rd)	9.2% (3rd)	10.9% (4th)	10.6% (4th)
16	October 21, 2017	12.1% (2nd)	11.1% (2nd)	12.7% (2nd)	12.4% (2nd)
17	November 4, 2017 (Note: No episodes were aired on October 28 and 29 due to the on-going labor strike at MBC. In return, MBC aired a special movie Train to Busan on October 29.)	11.9% (3rd)	10.4% (3rd)	11.5% (4th)	10.9% (4th)
18	November 4, 2017	12.1% (2nd)	11.3% (2nd)	12.9% (2nd)	13.1% (2nd)
19	November 12, 2017 (Note: Timeslot changed to Sundays at 20:45 from this point onward, with two episodes shown back-to-back each night.)	10.1% (6th)	9.4% (8th)	9.7% (7th)	8.9% (8th)
20	November 12, 2017	11.2% (4th)	10.7% (5th)	12.6% (4th)	11.3% (5th)
21	November 19, 2017	10.4% (6th)	9.6% (8th)	10.8% (5th)	10.2% (8th)
22	November 19, 2017	12.1% (4th)	12.2% (4th)	14.1% (4th)	12.7% (4th)
23	November 26, 2017	11.0% (6th)	9.5% (7th)	12.2% (6th)	11.4% (6th)
24	November 26, 2017	12.6% (4th)	11.6% (5th)	14.5% (4th)	13.7% (4th)
25	December 3, 2017	10.0% (9th)	9.6% (10th)	10.4% (9th)	10.0% (9th)
26	December 3, 2017	13.6% (4th)	13.2% (4th)	15.1% (3rd)	13.7% (4th)
27	December 10, 2017	10.5% (9th)	10.0% (9th)	10.7% (8th)	10.3% (9th)
28	December 10, 2017	12.9% (4th)	11.7% (6th)	14.6% (4th)	14.1% (4th)
29	December 17, 2017	11.5% (7th)	10.1% (8th)	12.3% (5th)	12.2% (6th)
30	December 17, 2017	12.2% (4th)	10.9% (7th)	14.3% (4th)	14.2% (4th)
31	December 24, 2017	10.7% (7th)	8.8% (8th)	10.1% (7th)	9.2% (8th)
32	December 24, 2017	13.9% (4th)	12.1% (4th)	14.2% (4th)	13.2% (4th)
33	January 7, 2018	14.1% (6th)	13.0%	12.9% (6th)	11.9% (7th)
34	January 7, 2018	18.1% (2nd)	15.2%	17.3% (3rd)	16.1% (4th)
35	January 14, 2018	13.9% (4th)	12.8%	14.3% (5th)	13.9% (5th)
36	January 14, 2018	17.6% (2nd)	16.5%	18.6% (3rd)	18.1% (3rd)
37	January 21, 2018	15.2% (4th)	14.1%	14.5% (5th)	13.5% (5th)
38	January 21, 2018	17.2% (3rd)	16.3%	17.2% (3rd)	15.9% (4th)
39	January 28, 2018	15.8% (4th)	15.1%	15.5% (5th)	14.8% (5th)
40	January 28, 2018	17.2% (3rd)	16.6%	18.2% (3rd)	17.7% (4th)
41	February 4, 2018	13.6% (4th)	12.8%	13.0% (5th)	12.2% (6th)
42	February 4, 2018	17.2% (3rd)	16.1%	17.9% (3rd)	16.9% (3rd)
43	February 11, 2018 (Note: Only one episode is aired due to coverage of the 2018 Winter Olympics.)	10.8% (7th)	10.7%	11.9% (7th)	11.9% (6th)
44	February 25, 2018 (Note: No episodes were aired on February 18 due to coverage of the 2018 Winter Olympics.)	7.8% (16th)	8.4%	7.8% (16th)	7.9% (15th)
45	March 4, 2018	12.2% (6th)	11.8%	11.5% (6th)	11.1% (8th)
46	March 4, 2018	18.1% (2nd)	17.4%	18.3% (2nd)	17.6% (3rd)
47	March 11, 2018	11.4% (5th)	11.1%	11.4% (5th)	11.2% (7th)
48	March 11, 2018	18.9% (2nd)	18.0%	19.1% (2nd)	18.3% (2nd)
49	March 18, 2018	16.3% (3rd)	16.0%	15.9% (3rd)	16.2% (4th)
50	March 18, 2018	18.2% (2nd)	17.9%	18.4% (2nd)	18.1% (2nd)
Average		12.0%	%	12.3%	11.8%
Special	November 15, 2017	—N/a	—N/a	3.7%	—N/a

== Awards and nominations ==
Year	Award	Category	Recipient	Result	Ref.
2018	11th Korea Drama Awards	Excellence Award, Actor	On Joo-wan	Won	
