= Song Kang =

South Korean actor (born 1994)

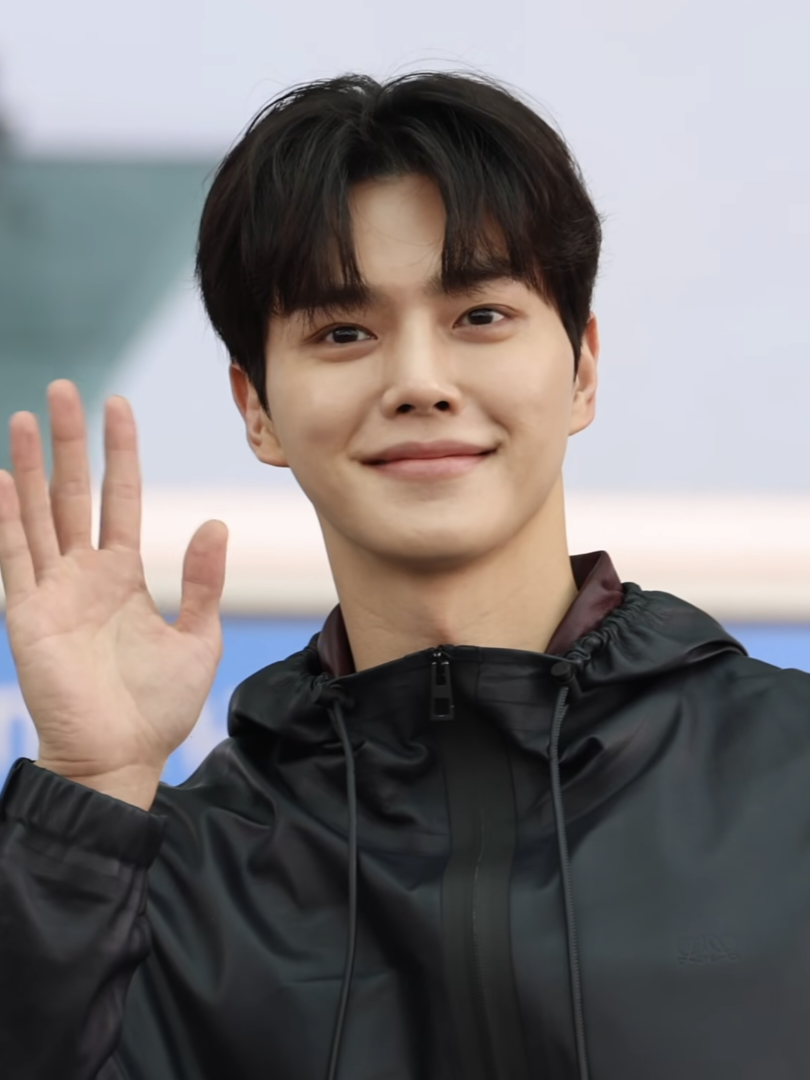
- Song in March 2026
- Born: April 23, 1994 (age 32); Suwon, South Korea
- Education: Konkuk University (Department of Film Arts)
- Occupation: Actor
- Years active: 2017–present
- Agent: Namoo Actors

Korean name
- Hangul: 송강
- RR: Song Gang
- MR: Song Kang

Signature
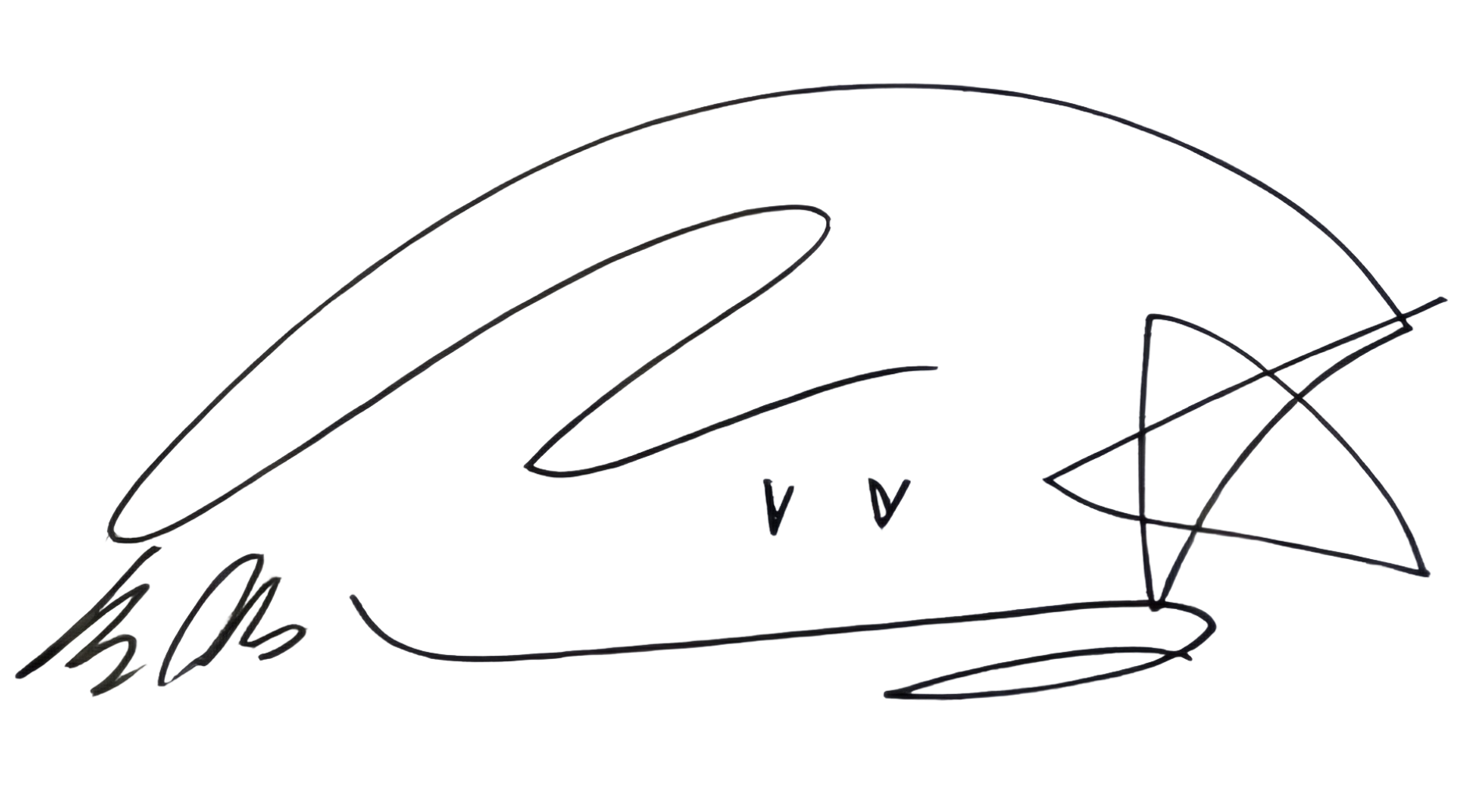

Song Kang (Korean: 송강; born April 23, 1994) is a South Korean actor. He is known for starring in the dramas Love Alarm (2019–2021), Sweet Home (2020–2024), Nevertheless (2021), and My Demon (2023–2024). He has been called the "Son of Netflix" because the majority of the series he has starred in were streamed on the platform.

== Career ==
=== 2016–2018: Beginnings ===
Song first appeared under Namoo Actors in December 2016.

Song made his acting debut with a supporting role in the 2017 tvN romantic comedy television series The Liar and His Lover. The same year, he was cast in the MBC family drama Man in the Kitchen. He also appeared in two music videos: "Sweet Summer Night" by acoustic duo The Ade and "Love Story" by Suran.

Song hosted the SBS music program Inkigayo from February to October 2018 along with Seventeen member Mingyu and DIA member Jung Chae-yeon. He also joined as a fixed cast member on the SBS variety show Village Survival, the Eight. For the two works, he was nominated for the "Rookie Award" at the 2018 SBS Entertainment Awards. In July 2018, Song made his big-screen debut with the fantasy film Beautiful Vampire.

=== 2019–2025: Rising popularity, leading roles, and military enlistment ===
In 2019, Song played the supporting role of Jung Kyung-ho's assistant in tvN fantasy melodrama When the Devil Calls Your Name. He next starred in the Netflix original romantic series Love Alarm, based on the popular webtoon of the same name. Song was cast in his first major role through auditions out of 900 people; he played the role of a handsome high-school student who falls in love with a girl played by Kim So-hyun, who was his best friend's secret crush. Love Alarm was ranked as one of Netflix's top releases of the year and was renewed for a second season. His final appearance that year was in the music video of Vibe's "Call Me Back".

Song was propelled to stardom in 2020 when he starred in apocalyptic horror Netflix original Sweet Home, based on the eponymous webtoon. He went to auditions after Love Alarm's director recommended him to the director of Sweet Home, Lee Eung-bok. His role was Cha Hyun-su, a suicidal high school boy who, along with a group of fellow apartment residents, tries to survive a "monsterization" apocalypse. Critical responses of the series were mixed, but gathered a wide international audience. A month after the release of the series, Variety revealed that it had been viewed by 22 million member households of Netflix. At the 57th Baeksang Arts Awards, Song received a nomination for Best New Actor – Television.

In 2021, Song reprised his role as Hwang Sun-oh in the second season of Love Alarm which was released on Netflix on March 12. He also appeared in the tvN series Navillera, adapted from the eponymous webtoon. He played a ballet student who struggles due to unresolved issues about his father and tries to support himself by working as a part-timer. Song took ballet lessons for six months in order to portray his character. Later the same year, Song starred in another webtoon adaptation, Nevertheless, JTBC's romance drama, alongside Han So-hee.

In terms of viewership record, 2021 was considered a success for Song as Sweet Home, Love Alarm, and Nevertheless ranked as fifth, sixth, and eighth most watched K-dramas in Netflix worldwide, respectively.

In 2022, Song starred in another JTBC drama, Forecasting Love and Weather, alongside Park Min-young. In 2023, Song took on a role in the SBS series My Demon, where he played the lead character alongside Kim You-jung.

=== 2026–present: Return to acting ===
Following completion of his mandatory military service, Song made his return to acting with the lead role in the tvN drama Four Hands, Two Sonatas, which aired from August to October 2026. He worked alongside actors Lee Jun-young and Jang Gyu-ri, playing the role of Kang Pi-o, a piano prodigy.

== Personal life ==
=== Military service ===
On February 29, 2024, Namoo Actors announced that Song will enlist to fulfill his mandatory military service as an active duty soldier on April 2, 2024. He was discharged on October 1, 2025.

== Endorsements ==
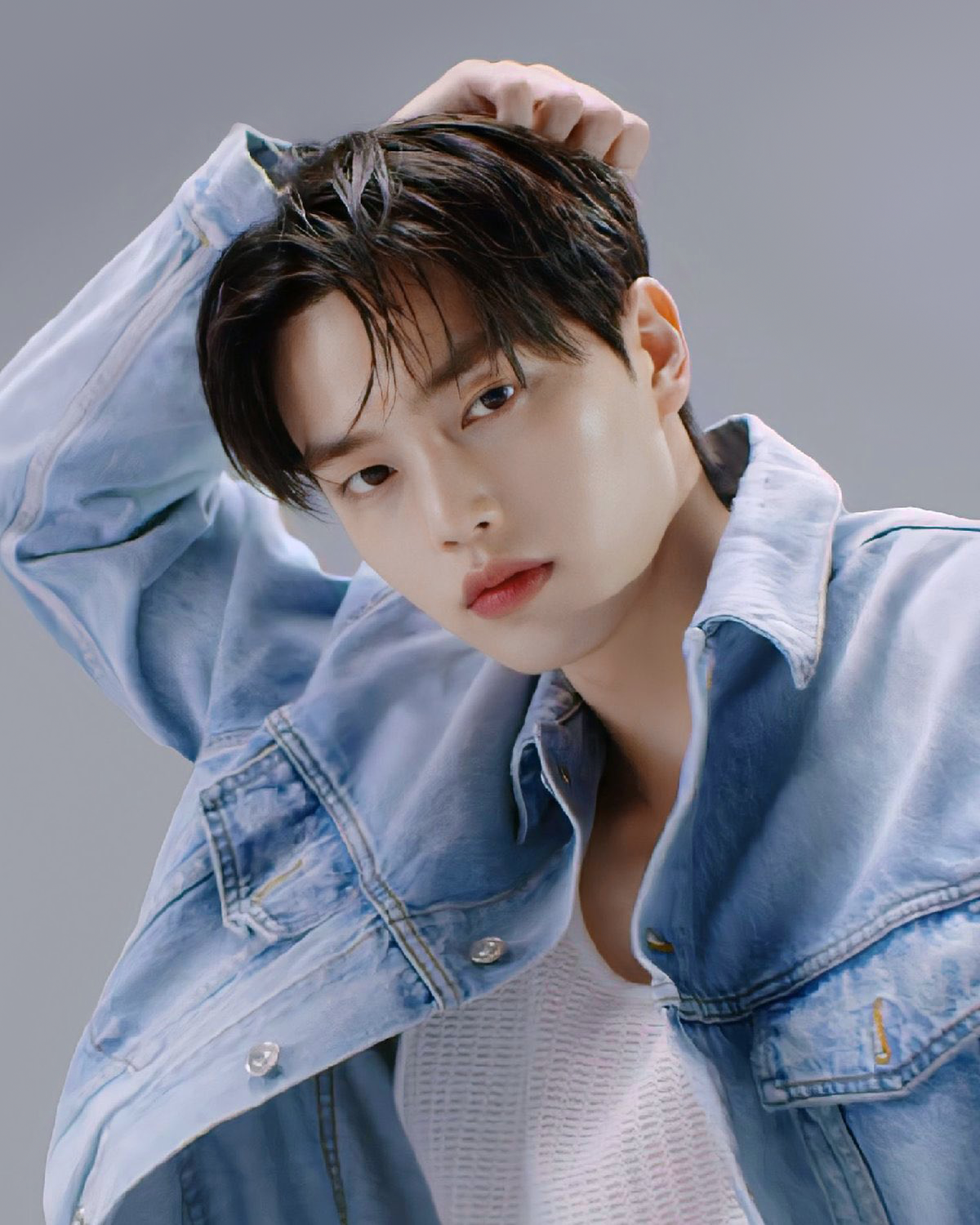
Song for Marie Claire, 2023

In 2020, Song was selected as brand ambassador for South Korean cosmetics brand Banila Co.. In 2021, Italian luxury fashion house Prada announced that Song was selected as a brand ambassador. In 2022, he was also selected as the brand ambassador for Bobbi Brown Cosmetics in the Asia-Pacific region. The same year, Song was named as Penshoppe's global ambassador.

== Filmography ==
=== Film ===
Year	Title	Role	Notes	Ref.
2018	Beautiful Vampire	Lee So-nyeon	Web film	
2024	Escape	Seon Woo-min	Cameo	

=== Television series ===
Year	Title	Role	Notes	Ref.
2017	The Liar and His Lover	Baek Jin-woo		
2017–2018	Man in the Kitchen	Kim Woo-joo		
2019	Touch Your Heart	Deliveryman	Cameo (Ep. 13)	
2019	When the Devil Calls Your Name	Luka		
2019–2021	Love Alarm	Hwang Sun-oh	Season 1–2	
2020–2024	Sweet Home	Cha Hyun-soo	Season 1–3	
2021	Navillera	Lee Chae-rok		
2021	Nevertheless	Park Jae-eon		
2022	Forecasting Love and Weather	Lee Shi-woo		
2023–2024	My Demon	Jeong Gu-won		
2026	Four Hands, Two Sonatas	Kang Pi-o		

=== Television shows ===
Year	Title	Role	Notes	Ref.
2018	Inkigayo	Host	Ep. 945–979	
2018–2019	Village Survival, the Eight	Cast member		
2024	I-Land 2	Storyteller		

=== Web shows ===
Year	Title	Role	Notes	Ref.
2018	I Oppa Don't Know	Cast Member	Studio Lulu Lala	

=== Music video appearances ===
Year	Song title	Artist	Ref.
2017	"Sweet Summer Night" (달콤한 여름밤)	The Ade	
2017	"Love Story" (러브스토리)	Suran	
2019	"Call Me Back" (이 번호로 전화해줘)	Vibe	
2026	"You're Under Arrest" (체포하겠어)	Illit	

== Accolades ==
=== Awards and nominations ===
Name of the award ceremony, year presented, category, nominee(s) of the award, and the result of the nomination
Award ceremony	Year	Category	Nominee(s)/work(s)	Result	Ref.
Asia Artist Awards	2026	Popularity Award – Actor	Song Kang	Pending	
Asia Contents Awards	2021	Newcomer Actor	Navillera	Nominated	
Asia Contents Awards	2021	ACA Excellence Award	Sweet Home	Won	
Baeksang Arts Awards	2021	Best New Actor – Television	Sweet Home	Nominated	
Brand Customer Loyalty Award	2021	Male actor – Rising Star	Song Kang	Won	
Brand of the Year Awards	2021	Rising Star Actor	Song Kang	Nominated	
SBS Drama Awards	2023	Top Excellence Award, Actor in a Miniseries Romance/Comedy Drama	My Demon	Won	
SBS Drama Awards	2023	Best Couple Award	My Demon (with Kim You-jung)	Won	
SBS Entertainment Awards	2018	Male Rookie Award	Village Survival, the Eight, Inkigayo	Nominated	
Seoul International Drama Awards	2021	Outstanding Korean Actor	Sweet Home	Nominated	
Seoul International Drama Awards	2021	Character of the Year	Sweet Home	Won	

=== Honors ===
Name of country or organization, year given, and name of honor or award
Country or Organization	Year	Honor or Award	Ref.
Newsis K-Expo Cultural Awards (Note: Established in 2019 and co-sponsored by Korea's Ministry of Culture, Sports and Tourism, Ministry of Foreign Affairs, Korea Creative Content Agency, Seoul Metropolitan Council and the Seoul Tourism Organization, it awards cultural icons, businesses, and individuals who have contributed greatly to Hallyu, the Korean wave.)	2024	Seoul Tourism Foundation CEO Award	

=== Listicles ===
Name of publisher, year listed, name of listicle, and placement
Publisher	Year	Listicle	Placement	Ref.
Cine21	2020	10 Stars and Rising Stars	Placed	
Cine21	2021	New Actors that will lead Korean Video Content Industry in 2022	5th (Note: mentioned together with Kim Seon-ho, Wi Ha-joon, Rowoon, Byeon Woo-seok, Lee Jun-young)	
