= Beautiful Gong Shim =

South Korean TV series

- Promotional poster
- Also known as: Pretty Ugly, Remember; Beast's Beauty; Dear Fair Lady Kong Shim
- Hangul: 미녀 공심이
- Hanja: 美女 공심이
- RR: Minyeo Gong Simi
- MR: Minyŏ Kong Simi
- Genre: Romance; Comedy
- Written by: Lee Hee-myung
- Directed by: Baek Soo-chan; Nam Tae-jin
- Starring: Namkoong Min; Bang Min-ah; On Joo-wan; Seo Hyo-rim
- Country of origin: South Korea
- Original language: Korean
- No. of episodes: 20

Production
- Executive producer: Park Young-soo
- Producer: Lee Seong-hoon
- Production company: The Story Works (a SBS company)

Original release
- Network: SBS
- Release: May 14 – July 17, 2016

Beautiful Gong Shim (Korean: 미녀 공심이) is a South Korean television series, starring Namkoong Min, Bang Min-ah, On Joo-wan and Seo Hyo-rim. It aired from May 14 to July 17, 2016, on SBS' Saturdays and Sundays at 22:00 (KST).

== Plot ==
Gong Shim (Bang Minah) always feels over-shadowed by her older sister Gong Mi (Seo Hyo-rim) due to the way the people around her treat the siblings. The beautiful Gong Mi, who works at a top-notch law firm, becomes the breadwinner of the family, while Gong Shim, considered to be ugly and awkward, is jobless. Gong Shim had to use all of her money to rent a room on the roof top of the rented-house her family is living in, as her previous bedroom is being used as Gong Mi's walk-in closet.

Having a plan to gather money for moving to Italy to pursue her dream of becoming an artist, Gong Shim decides to rent her rooftop room for 250,000 Won a month. This is when she meets Ahn Dan-tae (Namkoong Min), a lawyer who works voluntarily for those in need, despite his delinquent personality. After much misunderstanding, Dan-tae finally moves into the rooftop room and he becomes friendly with the son of a wealthy family, Joon-soo, through helping him out. Joon-soo's grandmother is grieving over the loss of her real blood-related grandson, Joon-pyo, who was kidnapped as a child.

Dan-tae quickly endears himself to Joon-soo's grandmother, who entrusts him with the task of finding Joon-pyo. In the meantime, Gong Shim is selected to be the personal secretary of Joon-soo's father, because she is considered ugly and his wife thinks it is better to have an unqualified but not pretty secretary. Gong Shim gradually starts settling in at her company, with the help of Joon-soo, for whom she falls. Dan-tae, however, is becoming jealous of her affection towards their mutual friend. It also starts to be clear that Dan-tae might be the long lost Joon-pyo, although he does not remember his painful past of being kidnapped and witnessing his mother's death. Gong Mi becomes her sister's rival when she accidentally meets Joon-soo and decides to get closer to him, because he is rich.

== Cast ==
=== Main cast ===
- Namkoong Min as Ahn Dan-tae / Seok Joon-pyo
  - Jo Yeon-ho as young Dan-tae

A 32-year-old man, Ahn Dan-tae rents the rooftop room from Gong Shim. Despite his delinquent traits, he's actually a lawyer who owns a small independent firm. He works part-time as a designated driver at night for extra income. His will to become a lawyer appeared as a form of guilt, as his mother died during his unfair imprisonment for beating up a bully, who then used his connections to press charges. He shows increasing curiosity towards Gong Shim, and later develops feelings towards her. His past, however, still remains mysterious.

- Bang Min-ah as Gong Shim

A 24-year-old girl, Gong Shim is always under pressure for "being ugly" her whole life. She tries her best to get a job as she wants to get away from the family that treats her unequally to her sister. Her life starts to spice up as she meets Dan-tae and Joon-soo; getting herself into a love-triangle.

- On Joo-wan as Seok Joon-soo

A 28-year-old man, Seok Joon-soo is the temporary heir of Star Group whose father was born to his grandfathers mistress. Despite his good manner and personality, his grandmother still despises him because her beloved daughter died and her grandson was kidnapped at his birthday party when he turned one . His friendship with Dan-tae begins after Dan-tae saves him from a group of thugs and this friendship also leads him to meet Gong Shim.

- Seo Hyo-rim as Gong Mi

A 28-year-old girl, Gong Mi is a typical, self-aware beauty and a lawyer at a respected firm. Being used to getting spoiled, she always finds her ways to get what she wants; even if it means sacrificing her own younger sister. She decides to become Joon-soo's wife, and does everything to catch the rich man's attention.

=== Gong Shim's family ===
- Oh Hyun-kyung as Joo Jae-boon

A 50-year-old woman, she is the Gong sisters' mother and a former Miss Gangneung.

- Woo Hyun as Gong Hyuk

A 52-year-old man, he is the Gong sisters' father, and he has graduated from Ivy League law school.

=== Star Distribution Group characters ===
- Jung Hye-sun as Nam Soon-cheon

A 78-year-old woman, she is Star Distribution Group's chairman, Seok Dae-hwang's mother, Joon-pyo and Joon-soo's grandmother

- Kyeon Mi-ri as Yeom Tae-hee

A 53-year-old woman, she is Seok Joon-soo's mother, Seok Dae-hwang's wife and a former singer.

- Kim Il-woo as Seok Dae-hwang

A 55-year-old man, he is Star Distribution Group's CEO, Joon-soo's father and chairman Seok Joo-cheol's child out of marriage

- Kim Byeong-ok as Yeom Tae-cheol

A 56-year-old man, he is Star Distribution Group's managing director, Yeom Tae-hee's older brother and Seok Joon-soo's outside uncle

- Sunwoo Yong-nyeo as Seok Dae-hwang's birth mother

=== People around Ahn Dan-tae ===
- Bang Eun-hee as Cheon Ji-yeon – Dan-tae's aunt
- Choi Hong-il as Ahn Soo-young – Dan-tae's father

=== Extended cast ===
- Shin Soo-ho as Shin Goo-nam – Gong Shim's best friend
- Kim Byung-se as the law firm representative, lawyer
- Kim Dong-gyun as petrol station's owner
- Kim Gi-cheon as police
- Kwon Tae-won as medical staff
- Joo Seok-tae as secretary
- Go Mi-young as lawyer Choi
- Ahn Soo-bin
- Yang Seung-geol
- Han Ga-rim as Gong Shim's schoolmate
- Lee Chang
- Kim Ho-chang
- Park No-sik
- Jo Hee-bong as salon's CEO
- Jin Hyun-kwang as son of studio's owner
- Geum Bo as Ho-joong
- Seo Jin-wook as doctor

=== Cameo appearances ===
- Lee Hye-sook as lawyer's wife

== Ratings ==
In the table below, the blue numbers represent the lowest ratings and the red numbers represent the highest ratings.

Episode #	Original broadcast date	Average audience share			
Episode #	Original broadcast date	TNmS Ratings		AGB Nielsen Ratings	
Episode #	Original broadcast date	Nationwide	Seoul National Capital Area	Nationwide	Seoul National Capital Area
1	May 14, 2016	7.6%	9.4%	8.9%	10.4%
2	May 15, 2016	7.3%	8.9%	9.6%	10.9%
3	May 21, 2016	8.2%	9.2%	10.7%	12.0%
4	May 22, 2016	9.0%	10.6%	10.4%	12.4%
5	May 28, 2016	10.4%	12.0%	11.1%	12.8%
6	May 29, 2016	10.5%	12.0%	11.2%	12.8%
7	June 4, 2016	9.3%	11.7%	10.9%	13.7%
8	June 5, 2016	12.0%	14.7%	13.6%	15.8%
9	June 11, 2016	9.3%	11.2%	12.1%	13.8%
10	June 12, 2016	9.7%	11.6%	13.2%	14.8%
11	June 18, 2016	11.2%	14.3%	13.1%	15.2%
12	June 19, 2016	10.1%	12.6%	13.1%	14.7%
13	June 25, 2016	9.7%	12.2%	12.3%	14.2%
14	June 26, 2016	10.9%	12.9%	14.2%	17.2%
15	July 2, 2016	11.7%	13.5%	13.5%	14.7%
16	July 3, 2016	11.4%	14.0%	13.0%	14.4%
17	July 9, 2016	11.1%	12.8%	12.9%	14.9%
18	July 10, 2016	11.7%	14.2%	13.1%	15.0%
19	July 16, 2016	11.3%	13.1%	14.8%	16.4%
20	July 17, 2016	12.8%	15.6%	15.1%	16.3%
Average		10.26%	12.33%	12.34%	14.12%

== Original soundtrack ==
=== Part 1 ===
No.	Title	Artist	Length
1.	"Struggling To You (힘들어하는 너에게)"	Woo Ye-rin	3:44
2.	"Struggling To You (힘들어하는 너에게)" (Inst.)		3:44
Total length:			7:28

=== Part 2 ===
No.	Title	Artist	Length
1.	"My First Kiss"	Minah (Girl's Day)	3:16
2.	"My First Kiss" (Inst.)		3:16
Total length:			6:32

=== Part 3 ===
No.	Title	Artist	Length
1.	"My Face Is Burning (화끈화끈해)"	Choi Sang Yup	3:06
2.	"My Face Is Burning (화끈화끈해)" (Inst.)		3:06
Total length:			6:12

=== Part 4 ===
No.	Title	Artist	Length
1.	"Love Cells (연애세포)"	Jang Woo-ram	3:14
2.	"Love Cells (연애세포)" (Inst.)		3:14
Total length:			6:28

=== Part 5 ===
No.	Title	Artist	Length
1.	"Found (찾았다)"	CoffeeBoy	2:33
2.	"Found (찾았다)" (Inst.)		2:33
Total length:			5:06

=== Part 6 ===
No.	Title	Artist	Length
1.	"You Look Pretty (예뻐보여)"	DinDin & Juniel	3:19
2.	"You Look Pretty (예뻐보여)" (Inst.)		3:19
Total length:			6:38

=== Part 7 ===
No.	Title	Artist	Length
1.	"Waiting For You (기다린다)"	Nell	3:15
2.	"Waiting For You (기다린다)" (Inst.)		3:15
Total length:			6:30

=== Part 8 ===
No.	Title	Artist	Length
1.	"Again (자꾸만)"	Wheesung	3:46
2.	"Again (자꾸만)" (Inst.)		3:46
Total length:			7:32

=== Part 9 ===
No.	Title	Artist	Length
1.	"If It's You (그대라면)"	Yeoeun (Melody Day)	3:25
2.	"If It's You (그대라면)" (Inst.)		3:25
Total length:			6:50

== International broadcast ==
In the United States, the drama aired in the Los Angeles DMA free, over-the-air on LA 18 KSCI-TV (channel 18) with English subtitles, Sat-Sun 8:50PM, from May 28 to July 31, 2016.

== Awards and nominations ==
Year	Award	Category	Recipient	Result
2016	SBS Drama Awards	Grand Prize (Daesang)	Namkoong Min	Nominated
2016	SBS Drama Awards	Top Excellence Award, Actor in a Romantic-Comedy Drama	Namkoong Min	Won
2016	SBS Drama Awards	Excellence Award, Actress in a Romantic-Comedy Drama	Bang Min-ah	Won
2016	SBS Drama Awards	Special Award, Actor in a Romantic-Comedy Drama	On Joo-wan	Won
2016	SBS Drama Awards	Special Award, Actress in a Romantic-Comedy Drama	Seo Hyo-rim	Nominated
2016	SBS Drama Awards	Best Couple Award	Namkoong Min and Bang Min-ah	Nominated
2016	SBS Drama Awards	Top 10 Stars Award	Namkoong Min	Won
2016	SBS Drama Awards	New Star Award	Bang Min-ah	Won
2016	SBS Drama Awards	Idol Academy Award – Best Eating	Namkoong Min	Nominated
2017	53rd Baeksang Arts Awards	Best New Actress	Bang Min-ah	Nominated
