= Bang Min-ah =

South Korean singer and actress (born 1993)

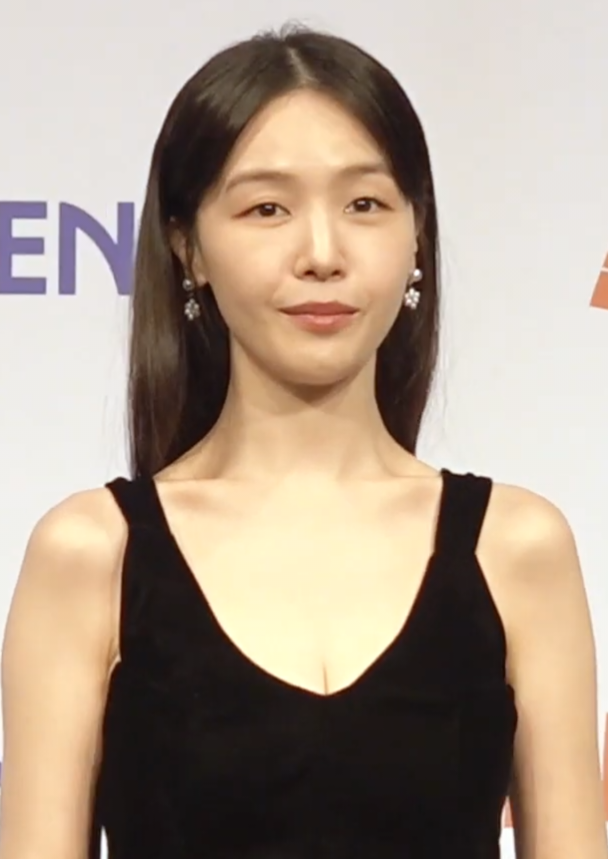
- Minah in February 2023
- Born: May 13, 1993 (age 33); Incheon, South Korea
- Education: Dongduk Women's University
- Occupations: Singer; actress
- Agent: SM C&C
- Spouse: On Joo-wan (m. 2025)
- Musical career
- Genre: K-pop
- Instrument: Vocals
- Years active: 2010–present
- Label: Dream T
- Member of: Girl's Day

Korean name
- Hangul: 방민아
- Hanja: 方珉娥
- RR: Bang Mina
- MR: Pang Mina

Bang Min-ah (Korean: 방민아; born May 13, 1993), better known mononymously as Minah, is a South Korean singer and actress. She debuted as a member of the girl group Girl's Day in 2010 and released her first solo album, I Am a Woman Too, in 2015. She has acted in various films and television series, including lead roles in Beautiful Gong Shim (2016) and My Absolute Boyfriend (2019).

== Early life ==
Bang Min-ah was born on May 13, 1993, in Hyoseong-dong, Gyeyang District, Incheon, South Korea. She attended Jinsun Girls' High School and majored in Broadcasting and Entertainment at Dongduk Women's University.

== Music career ==
=== Girl's Day ===
On July 9, 2010, Minah made her debut as a member of girl group Girl's Day on Music Bank with their first single "Tilt My Head."

=== Solo career ===
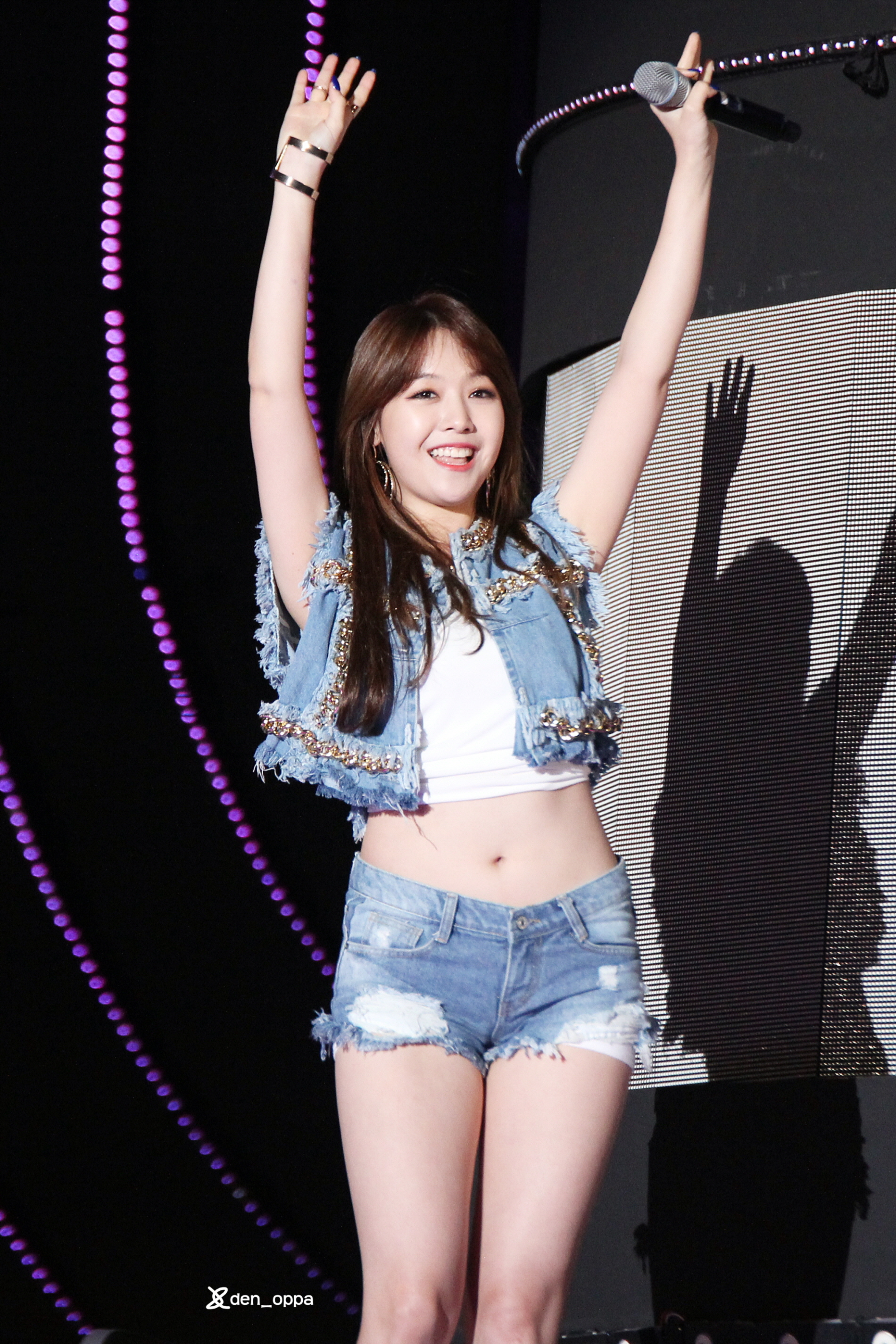
Minah performing at the KBS Music Bank Sky Festival in 2015

Minah has released several solo singles; among them are "Holding Hands," a song on Lee Hyun-do's project album 4U; and "You, I" for the soundtrack of the SBS drama Doctor Stranger.

On March 3, 2015, DreamT announced that Minah would be making her solo debut in mid-March. Minah released her album I Am a Woman Too on March 15, 2015.

Minah released a solo digital single "Other Way" on November 11, 2017. Minah took part in writing the lyrics to the song "11°", and also took part in composing the song.

On August 28, 2022, Minah made a comeback with her single "Listen to me Once".

== Acting career ==
Minah made her acting debut on the tvN variety show, Roller Coaster, appearing in the segment "Frustrated, But Let's Stick Together." She then featured in the sitcom Vampire Idol in 2011.

In 2013, Minah made her film debut in Holly, playing a high school student who aspires to be a ballerina. She received the Rookie Actress Award at the Gwangju International Film Festival for her performance. The same year, Minah became the host of the music program Inkigayo, which she left in January 2014. She was subsequently cast in her second film, the family comedy Dad for Rent.

In 2015, Minah featured in the family drama Sweet, Savage Family. She also starred alongside Seo Kang-joon as leads for The Best Future, a web drama produced by Samsung.

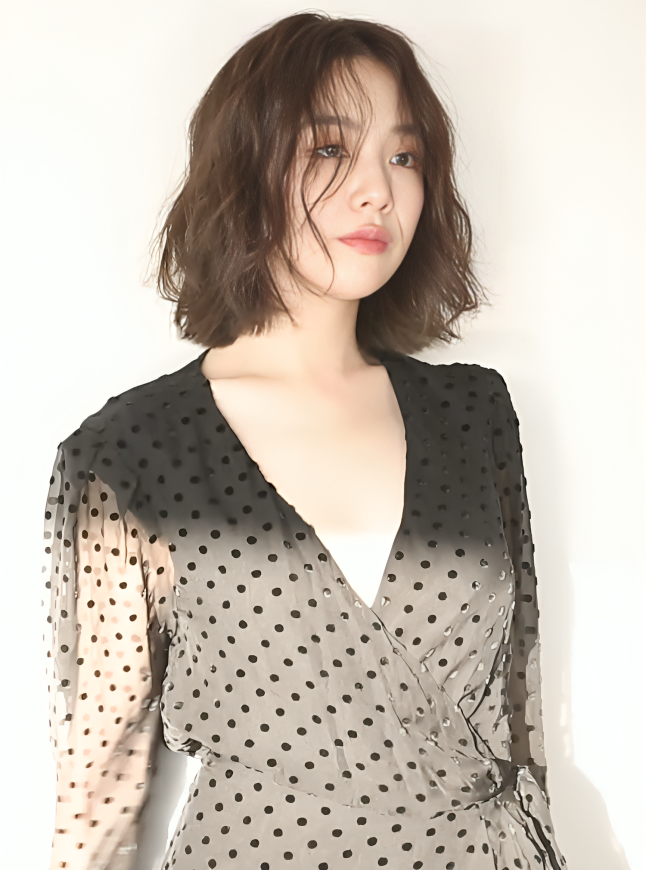
Bang in 2019

In 2016, Minah landed her first television leading role in SBS's romantic comedy series Beautiful Gong Shim. She earned positive reviews for her portrayal of the "ugly" but down-to-earth protagonist.

In 2019, Minah returned to the small screen with the romantic comedy drama My Absolute Boyfriend, based on the Japanese manga series of the same name.

== Personal life ==
On July 4, 2025, it was announced that Bang would marry her Beautiful Gong Shim co-star On Joo-wan after dating for four years. The couple married on November 29, 2025, in Bali.

== Discography ==
=== Extended plays ===
Title	Album details	Peak chart positions	Sales
Title	Album details	KOR	Sales
I Am a Woman Too	Released: March 16, 2015; Label: Dream T Entertainment; Format: CD, digital download	2	KOR: 15,471

=== Singles ===
Title	Year	Peak chart positions	Sales	Album
Title	Year	KOR	Sales	Album
"Holding Hands" (손만 잡을게) with DinDin	2014	51	KOR: 73,081	4U Project
"I Am a Woman Too"	2015	15	KOR: 308,989	I Am a Woman Too
"11°"	2017	—	KOR: 14,544	Other Way
"Butterfly" (알게 모르게)	2019	—	—N/a	non-album single
"—" denotes release did not chart.

=== Other charted songs ===
Title	Year	Peak chart positions	Sales	Album
Title	Year	KOR	Sales	Album
"Whatever" MC Mong feat. Min-ah	2014	8	KOR: 339,914	Miss Me Or Diss Me
"This Is Strange" (이상하다 참) feat. Kanto	2015	89	KOR: 21,711	I Am a Woman Too

=== Soundtrack appearances ===
Title	Year	Peak chart positions	Sales	Album
Title	Year	KOR	Sales	Album
"Cracked the Moon" (갈라진 달)	2010	—	—N/a	Argo Online OST
"Only Once" (단 한번만)	2010	—	—N/a	Jungle Fish 2 OST
"You, I" (니가내가)	2014	34	KOR: 82,617	Doctor Stranger OST
"Tell Me" (들려줘요)	2014	—	—N/a	Dad for Rent OST
"One Person" (한 사람)	2014	—	KOR: 16,249	The King's Face OST
"아니" (No) with Lee Min-hyuk	2015	—	—N/a	Sweet, Savage Family OST
"My First Kiss"	2016	—	—N/a	Beautiful Gong Shim OST
"사랑이었다" (It Was Love) with Jung Il-hoon	2019	—	—N/a	My Absolute Boyfriend OST
"—" denotes release did not chart.

== Filmography ==
=== Films ===
Year	Title	Role	Notes	Ref.
2013	Holly	Wani		
2014	Dad for Rent	Bomi		
2021	Snowball	Kang-yi	Rising Star Asia Award	
2023	Miss Fortune	Joo-young		
2024	The Unrighteous	Yu-jin		
2024	How Have You Been	Yeon-kyung		

=== Television series ===
Year	Title	Role	Notes	Ref.
2011	Baby Faced Beauty	Hye-mi	Cameo	
2011	Vampire Idol	Min-ah		
2012	Family	Dream Girl #1	Cameo	
2013	Master's Sun	Kim Ga-young	Cameo	
2013	The Miracle	Cha Eun-sang		
2014	The Best Future	Mi-rae		
2015	Sweet, Savage Family	Baek Hyun-ji		
2016	Beautiful Gong Shim	Gong Shim		
2019	My Absolute Boyfriend	Eom Da-da		
2021	Check Out the Event	Ha Song-yi		
2023	Delivery Man	Kang Ji-hyun		

=== Television shows ===
Year	Title	Role	Ref.
2010	Roller Coaster		
2010	Wonder Woman	Herself	
2010	Minah Cham Story	Herself	
2010	We Are Dating	Herself	
2010	Star Making Survivor	Contestant	
2013	The Clinic for Married Couples: Love and War	Herself	
2013–2014	Inkigayo	Host	
2014	Eco Village	Cast member	
2015	Immortal Songs 2	Contestant	
2015	Law of the Jungle	Cast member	
2015	King of Mask Singer	Contestant	
2022	Family Register Mate	Cast	

=== Hosting ===
Year	Title	Ref.
2022	Opening ceremony 24th Seoul International Women's Film Festival	

== Ambassadorship ==
- Public Relations Ambassador for the 24th Seoul International Women's Film Festival (2022)

== Accolades ==
=== Awards and nominations ===
Name of the award ceremony, year presented, category, nominee of the award, and the result of the nomination
Award ceremony	Year	Category	Nominee / Work	Result	Ref.
Baeksang Arts Awards	2017	Best New Actress – Television	Beautiful Gong Shim	Nominated	
Baeksang Arts Awards	2022	Best New Actress – Film	Snowball	Nominated	
Blue Dragon Film Awards	2021	Best New Actress	Snowball	Nominated	
Buil Film Awards	2022	Best New Actress	Snowball	Nominated	
Busan Film Critics Awards	2021	Best New Actress	Snowball	Won	
Chunsa Film Art Awards	2022	Best New Actress	Snowball	Nominated	
Gwangju International Film Festival	2013	Best New Actress	Holly	Won	
MBC Drama Awards	2021	Excellence Award, Actress in a Short Drama	Check Out the Event	Nominated	
New York Asian Film Festival	2021	Screen International Rising Star Asia Award	Snowball	Won	
SBS Drama Awards	2016	Excellence Award, Actress in a Romantic Comedy Drama	Beautiful Gong Shim	Won	
SBS Drama Awards	2016	New Star Award	Beautiful Gong Shim	Won	
SBS Drama Awards	2016	Best Couple Award	Bang Min-ah (with Namkoong Min); Beautiful Gong Shim	Nominated	
SBS Drama Awards	2019	Top Excellence Award, Actress in a Mid-Length Drama	My Absolute Boyfriend	Nominated	
Seoul International Youth Film Festival	2014	Best OST by a Female Artist	You, I	Nominated	
Seoul Music Awards	2016	Bonsang Award	I Am a Woman Too	Nominated	
Seoul Music Awards	2016	Popularity Award	Minah	Nominated	
Women in Film Korea Festival	2021	Best New Actress	Snowball	Won	

=== Listicles ===
Name of publisher, year listed, name of listicle, and placement
Publisher	Year	Listicle	Placement	Ref.
Cine21	2021	New Actress to watch out for in 2022	6th (Note: Tied with Go Min-si, Park Eun-bin, Keum Sae-rok, Moon Ga-young, Joo Hyun-young, Park Gyu-young, Lee Soo-kyung, Roh Yoon-seo, Gong Seung-yeon, Lee Se-young, IU, Keum Sae-rok, Park Ji-hu, Han So-hee, Jung Ji-so, Jeon Jong-seo, Roh Jeong-eui)	
