= Seo Hyo-rim =

South Korean actress (born 1985)

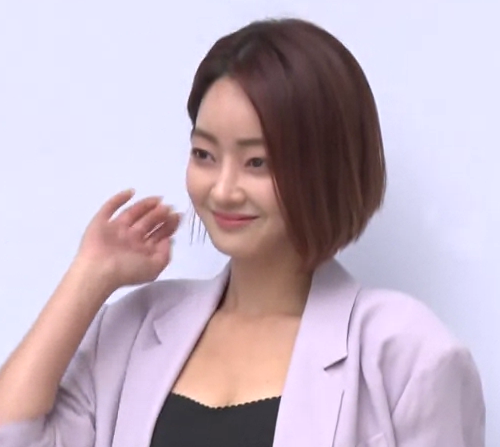
- Seo in 2018
- Born: January 6, 1985 (age 41); Yongsan District, Seoul, South Korea
- Education: Inha Technical College - Secretarial Studies
- Occupation: Actress
- Years active: 2007–present
- Agent(s): Imagine Asia (2015–2017); Content Y (2017–2019); MAGIQ Entertainment (2019–2022)
- Spouse: Jung Myung-ho (m. 2019)
- Children: 1
- Relatives: Kim Soo-mi (mother-in-law)

Korean name
- Hangul: 서효림
- Hanja: 徐孝琳
- RR: Seo Hyorim
- MR: Sŏ Hyorim

Seo Hyo-rim (Korean: 서효림; born January 6, 1985) is a South Korean actress.

== Filmography ==
=== Television series ===
Year	Title	Role	Notes/Ref.
2007	When Spring Comes	Hong-yi	
2007	In-soon Is Pretty	Kim Jung-ah	
2008	Here He Comes	Jung Hyo-rim	
2008	Worlds Within	Jang Hae-jin	
2009	Good Job, Good Job	Ha Eun-bi	
2009	Seti	Lee Mi-joo	
2010	Happiness in the Wind	Jang Man-se	
2010	Sungkyunkwan Scandal	Ha Hyo-eun	
2011	Scent of a Woman	Im Se-kyung	
2011	Me Too, Flower!	Kim Dal	
2013	That Winter, the Wind Blows	Jin So-ra	
2013	Master's Sun	Park Seo-hyun	Cameo (episode 9–10)
2014	Endless Love	Cheon Hye-jin	
2016	Beautiful Gong Shim	Gong Mi	
2017	Man in the Kitchen	Ha Yeon-joo	
2018	What's Wrong with Secretary Kim	Choi Seo-jin	Cameo (episode 9,16)
2018	It's My Life	Han Seung-joo	
2021	The Red Sleeve	Princess Hwawan	
2022	Behind Every Star		Cameo

=== Film ===
Year	Title	Role
2009	Closer to Heaven	Reporter (cameo)
2010	Enemy at the Dead End	Nurse Ha
2023	In Dream	Hong Hwa

=== Variety shows ===
Year	Title	Notes
2009	Big Star X-Files	Host
2009–2010	Music Bank	Host
2015	Law of the Jungle: Hidden Kingdom Special in Brunei	Cast member
2016–2017	Battle Trip	Contestant with Lee Chung-ah, episodes 27-30; Special MC, episodes 50-51

=== Music video appearances ===
Year	Song title	Artist
2007	"Perfectly! My Lover"	Suh Young-eun
2008	"Woman"	Ilac
2009	"Bad Woman"	F.T. Island
2010	"Y"	MBLAQ

== Awards and nominations ==
Year	Award	Category	Nominated work	Result
2008	KBS Drama Awards	Best New Actress	Worlds Within	Nominated
2011	6th Asia Model Awards	CF Model Award	—N/a	Won
2011	SBS Drama Awards	New Star Award	Scent of a Woman	Won
2014	SBS Drama Awards	Excellence Award, Actress in a Serial Drama	Endless Love	Nominated
2017	2017 MBC Drama Awards	Excellence Award, Actress in a Weekend Drama	Man in the Kitchen	Nominated
2018	KBS Drama Awards	Excellence Award, Actor in a Daily Drama	It's My Life	Nominated
