= Studio S (South Korean company) =

South Korean drama production company

Studio S, Inc. (Note: Mistakenly written on the copyright portion of the company website as "StudioS. Inc.")
- Studio S logo with "Studio" written in Hangul, and the same word at the red line within the "S" part written in letter case English alphabet. There is also a version of the logo with "Studio" written in letter case English alphabet and the same word at the red line within the "S" part written in Hangul.
- Native name: 스튜디오S; 스튜디오에스
- Type: Private subsidiary
- Industry: Entertainment
- Founded: March 16, 2010; 16 years ago
- Headquarters: 15th and 16th floors, SBS Prism Tower, 82 Sangam-san-ro, Sangam-dong, Mapo-gu, Seoul, South Korea
- Area served: Worldwide
- Key people: Hong Seong-chang
- Products: Korean dramas
- Services: Production; Distribution
- Owner: Seoul Broadcasting System
- Parent: Seoul Broadcasting System
- Subsidiaries: Binge Works
- Website: https://s-studio.co.kr

Studio S (스튜디오S (Note: Also written as "스튜디오에스".)), formerly known as The Story Works Co. is a South Korean drama production company. It is a subsidiary of Seoul Broadcasting System (SBS).

== Production works ==
=== As production company ===
Year	Title	Network	Associated Production	Ref.
2012	Phantom	SBS TV	HB Entertainment	
2013	The Empire of Gold	SBS TV		
2013	All About My Romance	SBS TV		
2014	Angel Eyes	SBS TV		
2015	The Village: Achiara's Secret	SBS TV	RaemongRaein	
2016	Beautiful Gong Shim	SBS TV		
2017	Innocent Defendant	SBS TV	Signal Entertainment Group	
2017	Suspicious Partner	SBS TV		
2017	Distorted	SBS TV		
2018	Return	SBS TV		
2018	Secret Mother	SBS TV		
2018	Your Honor	SBS TV	iHQ	
2018	Heart Surgeons	SBS TV		
2019	Doctor Detective	SBS TV		
2019	Secret Boutique	SBS TV		
2019	VIP	SBS TV		
2020	Nobody Knows	SBS TV		
2020	Alice	SBS TV		
2020	Do You Like Brahms?	SBS TV		
2020–21	The Penthouse: War in Life	SBS TV	Chorokbaem Media	
2021–25	Taxi Driver (Season 1–3)	SBS TV	Group 8; B.A. Entertainment (Note: Season 3 only)	
2021	Lovers of the Red Sky	SBS TV	Studio Taeyou	
2021	Jinx	KakaoTV	FNC Story; Mays Entertainment	
2022	Through the Darkness	SBS TV		
2022	Business Proposal	SBS TV	Kross Pictures	
2022	One Dollar Lawyer	SBS TV		
2022	Cheer Up	SBS TV		
2022	Trolley	SBS TV		
2022	Revenge of Others	Disney+		
2022–23	The First Responders	SBS TV	Mega Monster	
2023	Dr. Romantic (Season 3)	SBS TV	Samhwa Networks	
2023	Revenant	SBS TV	B.A. Entertainment	
2023	The Killing Vote	SBS TV	Pan Entertainment	
2023	My Demon	SBS TV	Binge Works	
2023–24	The Escape of the Seven (Season 1–2)	SBS TV	Chorokbaem Media	
2024	Flex X Cop	SBS TV	Big Ocean ENM; B.A. Entertainment	
2024	Connection	SBS TV	Good Harvest; Soul Pictures	
2024	Good Partner	SBS TV	Studio&NEW	
2024	Seoul Busters	Disney+	BA Entertainment; Chorokbaem Media	
2024	The Judge from Hell	SBSTV		
2024	The Fiery Priest (Season 2)	SBSTV	Big Ocean ENM; Red Nine Pictures; Gilstory Ent	
2024	Brewing Love	ENA		
2025	Love Scout	SBS TV	EO Contents Group	
2025	Buried Hearts	SBS TV	A2Z Entertainment; Prumir Factory	
2025	The Haunted Palace	SBS TV	IWill Media	
2025	Spring of Youth	SBS TV	FNC Story; Monster Union	
2025	Our Movie	SBS TV	Beyond J	
2025	The Winning Try	SBS TV		
2025	Beyond the Bar	JTBC	SLL; B.A Entertainment; Story Allum Corporation	
2025	Would You Marry Me?	SBS TV	Samhwa Networks	
2025	As You Stood By	Netflix	Ghost Studio	
2025	Dynamite Kiss	SBS TV	Samhwa Networks	
2026	Phantom Lawyer	SBS TV	Mongjakso	
2026	Sold Out on You	SBS TV	Beyond J; Slingshot Studios	
2026	My Royal Nemesis	SBS TV	Gill Pictures	
2026	Agent Kim Reactivated	SBS TV	Fantagio	
2026	Our Sticky Love	Netflix		
2026	Flex X Cop (Season 2)	SBS TV	Big Ocean ENM; B.A. Entertainment	
2026	Doctor X: Mafia in White	SBS TV	Studio Dragon; HighZium Studio	
2026	Nine to Six	SBS TV	Samhwa Networks	
2026	Good Partner (Season 2)	SBS TV	Studio&NEW; Artist Company	
2026	Your Ground	MBC TV		
2027	The Long Shot Trial	SBSTV	Artist Studio	
2027	Excitatio	SBSTV	TME Group	

=== As planner/creator/developer ===
Year	Title	Network	Production Companies	Ref.
2014	A Girl Who Sees Smells	SBS TV	SBS Plus	
2014	Divorce Lawyer in Love	SBS TV	Samhwa Networks; JS Top Entertainment	
2020	Good Casting	SBS TV	Box Media Corporation	
2020	Delayed Justice	SBS TV	Studio&NEW	
2021	One the Woman	SBS TV	Gill Pictures	
2021-22	Our Beloved Summer	SBS TV	Studio N; Super Moon Pictures	
2022	Why Her	SBS TV	VO Media	
2023	Payback: Money and Power	SBS TV	Red Nine Pictures	
2025	Queen Mantis	SBS TV	Mega Monster; Merry Christmas	
2026	No Tail to Tell	SBS TV	Binge Works; Mog Films	

== Subsidiaries ==
=== Television production ===
- Binge Works
