= 2023 SBS Drama Awards =

31st edition of award ceremony

- Official poster
- Date: December 29, 2023
- Site: SBS Prism Tower, Sangam-dong, Mapo-gu, Seoul
- Hosted by: Shin Dong-yup; Kim You-jung
- Produced by: Kim Jun-su
- Official website: SBS Awards

Highlights
- Grand Prize (Daesang): Kim Tae-ri and Lee Je-hoon

Television coverage
- Network: SBS

The 2023 SBS Drama Awards, presented by Seoul Broadcasting System (SBS). It was held on December 29, 2023, from 20:35 (KST) at SBS Prism Tower in Sangam-dong, Mapo-gu, Seoul. The show was hosted by Shin Dong-yup for the 6th consecutive time, and Kim You-jung for the third time.

The award ceremony was held in a serene atmosphere in the aftermath of the late Lee Sun-kyun's death. Most of actors were wearing black attires, and the Payback team, in which the Lee Sun-kyun was main character didn't attend the ceremony. Kim Tae-ri and Lee Je-hoon were jointly awarded the Grand Prize (Daesang).

== Winners and nominees ==
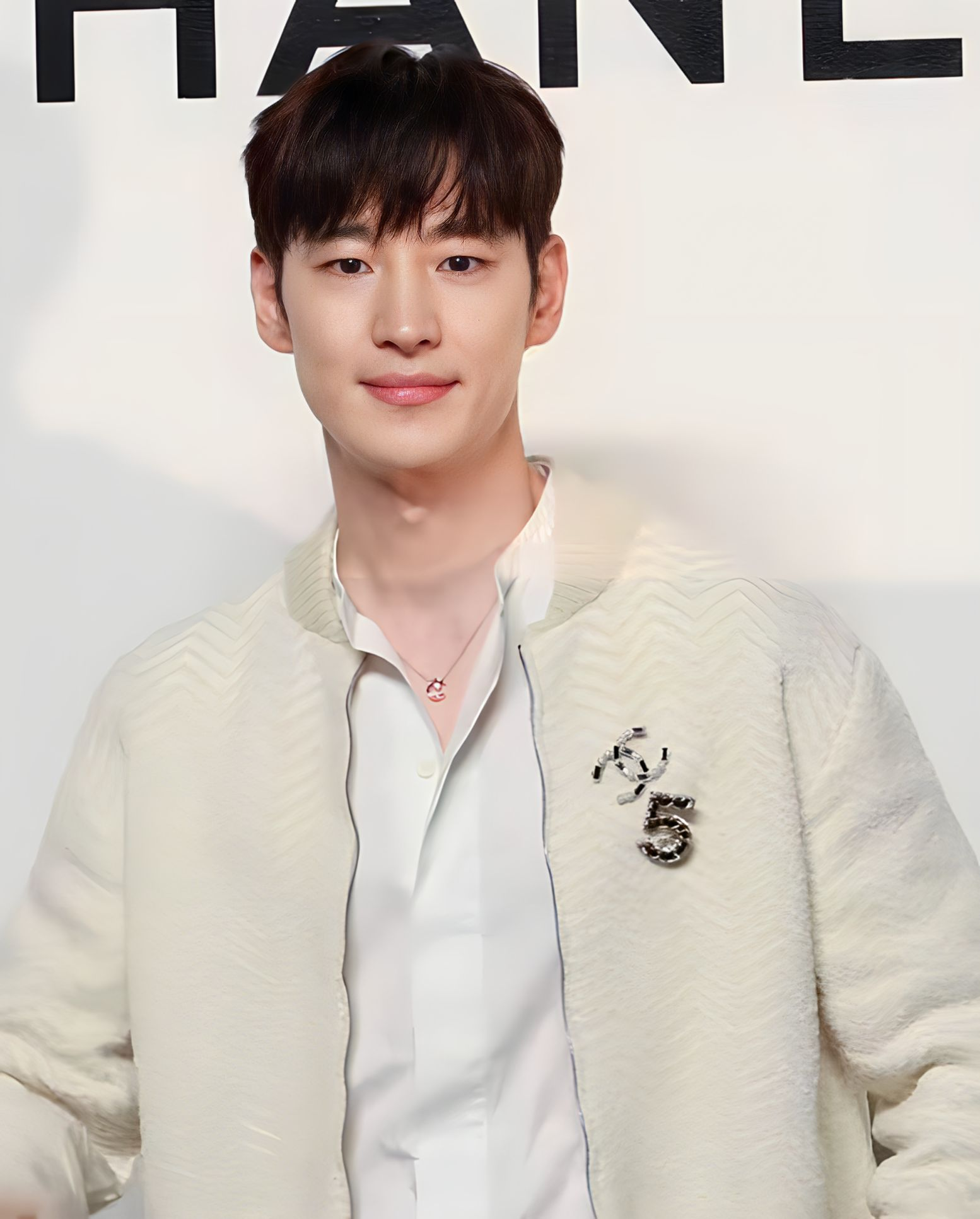
Lee Je-hoon, Grand Prize (Daesang) joint winner

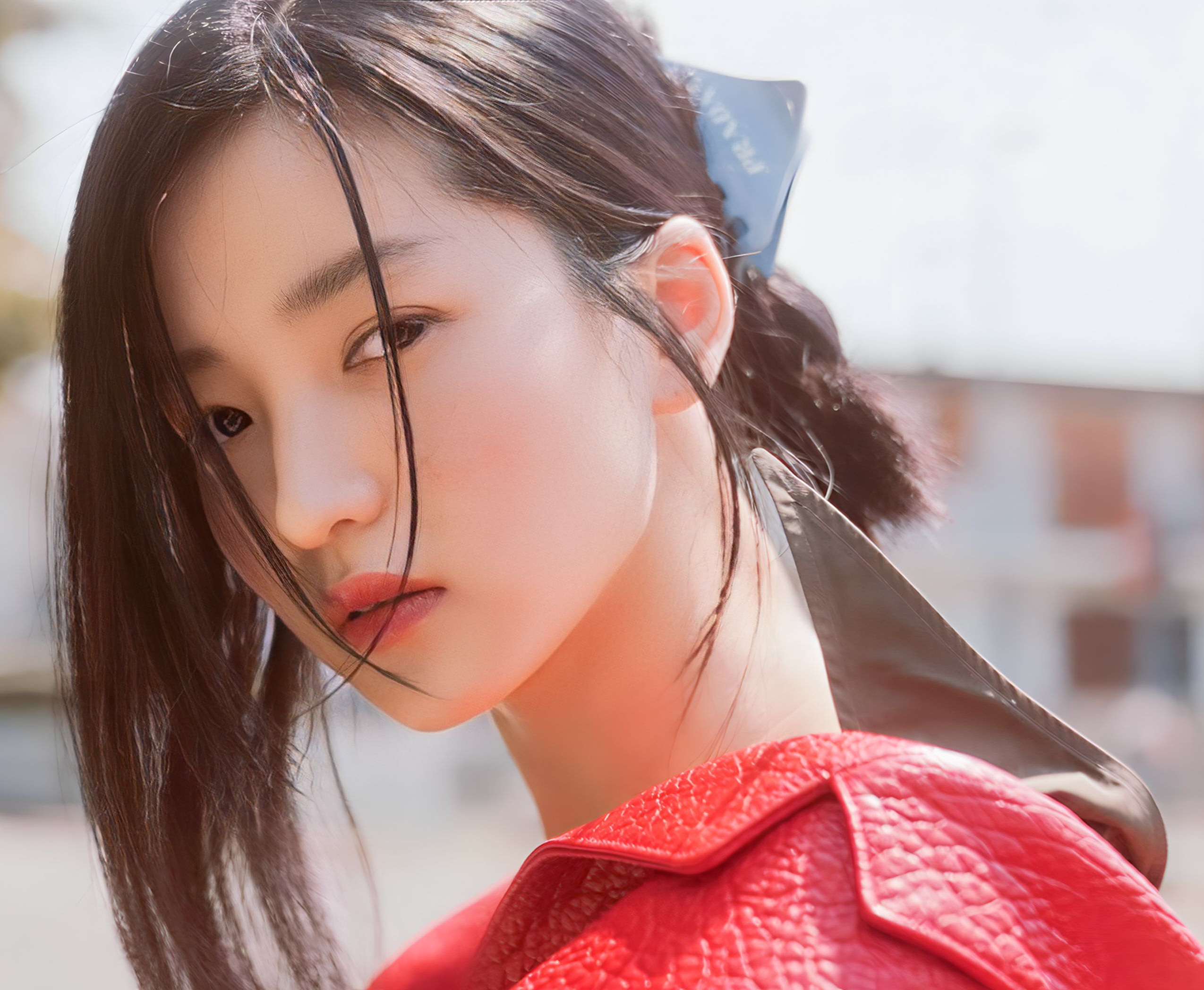
Kim Tae-ri, Grand Prize (Daesang) joint winner

Nominations for Grand Prize were revealed on December 27, 2023.

Winners are listed first and denoted in bold.

List of Awards
Grand Prize (Daesang)
**Lee Je-hoon – Taxi Driver 2**; **Kim Tae-ri – Revenant**; Han Suk-kyu – Dr. Romantic 3; Kim Rae-won – The First Responders 2
Top Excellence Award, Actor in a Miniseries Genre/Action Drama	Top Excellence Award, Actress in a Miniseries Genre/Action Drama
**Park Sung-woong – The Killing Vote**; Park Hae-jin – The Killing Vote; Um Ki-joon – The Escape of the Seven; Oh Jung-se – Revenant	**Moon Chae-won – Payback**; Kim Tae-ri – Revenant; Lim Ji-yeon – The Killing Vote; Hwang Jung-eum – The Escape of the Seven
Top Excellence Award, Actor in a Miniseries Romance/Comedy Drama	Top Excellence Award, Actress in a Miniseries Romance/Comedy Drama
**Song Kang – My Demon**; Park Hee-soon – Trolley; Kim Mu-yeol – Trolley	**Kim You-jung – My Demon**; Kim Hyun-joo – Trolley
Top Excellence Award, Actor in a Seasonal Drama	Top Excellence Award, Actress in a Seasonal Drama
**Ahn Hyo-seop – Dr. Romantic 3**; Lee Je-hoon – Taxi Driver 2; Han Suk-kyu – Dr. Romantic 3; Kim Rae-won – The First Responders 2	**Lee Sung-kyung – Dr. Romantic 3**; Gong Seung-yeon – The First Responders 2
Excellence Award, Actor in a Seasonal Drama	Excellence Award, Actress in a Seasonal Drama
**Shin Jae-ha – Taxi Driver 2**; Kang Ki-doong – The First Responders 2; Kim Min-jae – Dr. Romantic 3	**Pyo Ye-jin – Taxi Driver 2**; Woo Mi-hwa – The First Responders 2; So Joo-yeon – Dr. Romantic 3
Excellence Award, Actor in a Miniseries Genre/Action Drama	Excellence Award, Actress in a Miniseries Genre/Action Drama
**Lee Joon – The Escape of the Seven**; **Hong Kyung – Revenant**; Park Hoon – Payback; Kim Kwon – The Killing Vote	**Lee Yu-bi – The Escape of the Seven**; Son Eun-seo – Payback; Kim Yoo-mi – The Killing Vote; Jo Yoon-hee – The Escape of the Seven
Excellence Award, Actor in a Miniseries Romance/Comedy Drama	Excellence Award, Actress in a Miniseries Romance/Comedy Drama
**Ryeoun – The Secret Romantic Guesthouse**; Kang Hoon – The Secret Romantic Guesthouse; Jung Gun-joo – The Secret Romantic Guesthouse; Kim Tae-hoon – My Demon	**Shin Ye-eun – The Secret Romantic Guesthouse**; Jo Hye-joo – The Secret Romantic Guesthouse; Hwang Bo-reum-byeol – The Secret Romantic Guesthouse
Best Supporting Performance in a Miniseries Genre/Action Drama	Netizen Choice's SBS Best Drama
**Kim Won-hae – Revenant**; Kim Hae-sook – Revenant; Park Ji-young – Revenant; Kim Hye-hwa – Payback; Shin Jung-geun – The Killing Vote; Yoon Tae-young – The Escape of the Seven	**Taxi Driver 2**
Best Supporting Actor in a Seasonal Drama	Best Supporting Actress in a Seasonal Drama
**Bae Yoo-ram – Taxi Driver 2**; **Jang Hyuk-jin – Taxi Driver 2**; Oh Eui-shik – The First Responders 2; Yoon Na-moo – Dr. Romantic 3	**Son Ji-yoon – The First Responders 2**; Jin Kyung – Dr. Romantic 3; Jung Ji-ahn – Dr. Romantic 3
Best Supporting Actor in a Miniseries Romance/Comedy Drama	Best Supporting Actress in a Miniseries Romance/Comedy Drama
**Jeong Soon-won – My Demon and Trolley**; In Gyo-jin – The Secret Romantic Guesthouse; Heo Jung-do – My Demon	**Seo Jung-yeon – My Demon and Trolley**; Ryu Hyun-kyung – Trolley; Lee Yoon-ji – My Demon; Han Chae-ah – The Secret Romantic Guesthouse
Best Couple Award	Scene Stealer Award
**Song Kang and Kim You-jung – My Demon**; Ahn Hyo-seop and Lee Sung-kyung – Dr. Romantic 3; Ryeoun and Shin Ye-eun – The Secret Romantic Guesthouse	**Go Sang-ho– Dr. Romantic 3 and Taxi Driver 2**; **Byun Jung-hee – Dr. Romantic 3 and Taxi Driver 2**; Kim Cheol-jin – My Demon; Shim Dal-gi – Revenant; Jeon Sung-woo– The First Responders 2
Best New Actor	Best New Actress
**Kim Do-hoon – The Escape of the Seven**; **Kang You-seok– Payback**; **Lee Shin-young – Dr. Romantic 3**; **Lee Hong-nae – Dr. Romantic 3**	**Kwon Ah-reum – The Killing Vote**; **Yang Hye-ji – Revenant**; **Chung Su-bin – Trolley**
Best Young Actor	Best Young Actress
**Choi Hyun-jin – The Killing Vote**; **Han Ji-an – Dr. Romantic 3**	**Park So-yi – Revenant**; **Ahn Chae-heum – Taxi Driver 2**; Ahn Se-bin – The First Responders 2; Lee Ga-yeon – Dr. Romantic 3; Choi Myung-bin – Trolley
Best Supporting Team	Best Performance
**Dr. Romantic 3**	**Jin Seon-kyu – Revenant**

== Presenters ==
Presenter(s)	Award(s)	Ref.
Lee Eugene and Kim Min-seo	Best Young Actor/Actress	
Im Chul-soo	Scene Stealer Award	
Lee Deok-hwa	Netizen's Best SBS Drama of 2023	
Ahn Hyo-seop and Kim Se-jeong	Best Couple Award	
Kim Nam-gil and Studio S CEO Han Jeong-hwan	Grand Prize (Daesang)	

== Performances ==
Order	Artist	Act performed	Ref.
1	Tomorrow X Together	" Chasing that feeling " + " Happily ever after "	
2	Hwasa	"LMM"	
3	Guckkasten	'Exemplary Taxi 2 OST'	
4	Ahn Hyo-seop and Lee Sung-kyung	'Romantic Doctor Teacher Kim 3' Doldamz's special celebration stage	

== See also ==
- 2023 MBC Drama Awards
- 2023 KBS Drama Awards
