= Jeong Soon-won =

South Korean actor (born 1987)

- Born: January 27, 1987 (age 39); Seoul, South Korea
- Education: Kaywon Arts High School Theatre film department (Class of 2002); Seoul Institute of the Arts Department of Broadcasting and Entertainment (2005 to 2012)
- Occupation: Actor
- Years active: 2006–present
- Agent: El July Entertainment
- Spouse: Kang Ji-hye (m. 2017)
- Children: 1 (daughter)

Korean name
- Hangul: 정순원
- RR: Jeong Sunwon
- MR: Chŏng Sunwŏn
- Website: ljulyent.com/index

Jeong Soon-won (Korean: 정순원, born January 27, 1987) is a South Korean actor and manga artist. He won Best Supporting Actor in a Miniseries Romance/Comedy Drama in 2023 SBS Drama Awards for his performance in miniseries Trolley (2022–2023) and My Demon (2023).

== Early life and education ==
From a young age, Jeong Soon-won would reportedly often open the talent show at a nearby kindergarten. He was also a leading actor in school talent shows, church plays and other local performances. From the age of seven, Jeong was appreciated by adults for his lively introductions, singing, and dancing at family events. He found satisfaction in making audiences laugh on stage and dreamed of appearing on television and being recognized at awards shows.

In 2003, he enrolled in the theater film department of Kaywon Arts High School. After graduating from high school, he majored in acting at the Department of Broadcasting and Entertainment of Seoul Institute of the Arts from 2005 to 2012.

== Career ==
Jeong made his debut in the 2006 musical The Celestial Watch.[5] He has played various roles in different productions, including Kang Geon in "Lovers in Paris" (2011), Sang Goo in "The Days" (2013), Sammy in "The Wedding Singer" (2013), and Shin Seok Goo in "The Goddess is Watching" (2014). After starring in the play Model Student, Jeong gained some recognition as a "Daehakro (comparable to Off-Broadway) "theater idol".

In 2016, Jeong auditioned for multiple roles in Theater Ganda's John Cariani's omnibus play, Almost, Maine. Jeong was cast after breaking through the competition rate of 200 to 1 and performed as part of second team from April 2012.

His most notable role was in Lim Sang-choon's mini-series Fight for My Way, where he played a hard-working boxer who faced off against the main character Park Seo-joon's character.

In November 2016, Jeong joined Park Dong-wook's play Voice of Millenium. The play was produced by Space to Create, a theater company founded by Ahn Hyuk-won and Jeon Seok-ho. Directed by Park Seon-hee, it was performed from November 5 to December 31 at Dongsoong Art Center Dongsoong Small Theater.

== Personal life ==
Jeong Soon-won married musical actress Kang Ji-hye at the Namsan Arts Center in Seoul on September 18, 2017. The two met in the musicals The Days and Grease and tied the knot after about three years of dating. When Jeong won the SBS Drama Award, he dedicated the award to his family, his mother and ailing father, his wife and daughter. His father died a month later.

== Filmography ==
=== Film ===
Year	Title	Role	Notes	Ref.
2011	Re-encounter	Parking agent 2 station		
2014	ㅈㄱㅇㄴ	단편		
2014	그댄 나의 뱀파이어			
2016	A Man and a Woman	One director		
2016	혼숨	Gyeongjin		
2017	One Day	Bumjin		
2017	The Bros	late team leader		
2017	Along with the Gods: The Two Worlds	Guard		
2017	1987: When the Day Comes	Baekgoldan		
2020	메소드연기	director Jung		
2021	스프링 송	Jeong Soon-own		
2022	아이를 위한 아이	delivery president		

=== Television series ===
Year	Title	Role	Notes	Ref.
2011	Heartstrings		Bit role	
2016	Pied Piper	Kidnapping worker		
2016	Entourage			
2016	Monster	Oh Jin-cheol (Cha Dong-soo)		
2017	Tunnel			
2017	Fight for My Way	Han Du-ho		
2017	Duel	victim of the manipulation case	Special appearance	
2017	Reunited Worlds			
2018	Lovely Horribly	Chun-gyeol		
2018	Big Forest	Choo Sim-soo		
2019	Haechi	Joo Young-han		
2019	Watcher	Jeong Han-wook		
2019	Doctor Detective	Team leader Jung		
2019	Be Melodramatic	drama director		
2020	The Good Detective	Jimangu		
2021	Vincenzo	Kim Hyun-seop	Special appearance	
2021	Yumi's Cells	Nam Joo-hyuk (Chief Nam)		
2021	Sell Your Haunted House	Yang Woo-jin		
2021	Secret Royal Inspector & Joy			
2020	Dr. Romantic		Season 1	
2022	Through the Darkness	Nam Il-young		
2022	Model Detective 2	Jimangu		
2022	Under the Queen's Umbrella			
2022	Trolley	Go Min-seok		
2023	The Kidnapping Day	Chae Jeong-man		
2023	My Demon	Wild dog boss 2		
2024	Connection	Heo Joo-song		
2024	A Virtuous Business			
2025	Resident Playbook	Koo Seung-won		

=== Web series ===
Year	Title	Role	Notes	Ref.
2021	The Silent Sea	Gong Soo-chan	Netflix original series	

== Stage ==
=== Musical concert ===
Musical concert performances
Year	Title		Role	Venue	Date	Ref.
Year	English	Korean	Role	Venue	Date	Ref.
2014	Musical Story Show 10th Anniversary with Lee Seok-jun	뮤지컬 이야기쇼 이석준과 함께 10주년	Special appearance	LG Arts Center	May 26, 2014	
2015	Musical Talk Concert Housewarming - Prisoners	뮤지컬 토크 콘서트 집들이 - 포로들	Singer	Daehak-ro T.O.M.2	May 18, 2015	
2017	2017 The Musical Festival	2017 더 뮤지컬 페스티벌	Singer	Nanji Han River Park	September 9 to 10, 2017	

=== Musical play ===
Musical play performances
Year	Title		Role	Venue	Date	Ref.
Year	English	Korean	Role	Venue	Date	Ref.
2006	The Celestial Watch	천상시계	Jang Young-shil	Towol Theater, Seoul Arts Center	January 31 to February 12	
2008	Mine	마인		Chungmu Art Hall Grand Theatre	October 24 to 26	
2012	Winter Fantasy	겨울환상곡	Byeong-jun	Jiin Theater (formerly Al and Nucleus Theater)	January 7 to February 14, 2012	
2012	Lovers in Paris	파리의 연인	Gang-geon	Decube Link Art Center	April 5, 2012 - May 28, 2012	
2012	Dramatic Laboratory Hyehwa-dong #1	연극실험실 혜화동 1번지	Dimitri	-	July 1, 2012	
2012	Legally Blond	금발이 너무해	Arab Prince; Lowell; Judge	COEX Shinhan Card Artium	November 17 to March 17	
2013	The Days	그날들	Sang-gu	Daehakro Musical Center Main Theater	April 4 – June 30	
2013	The Days	그날들	Sang-gu	Daejeon Arts Center Art Hall	July 5–7	
2013	The Days	그날들	Sang-gu	Daegu Gyeongnam Art Center	July 19–21	
2013	The Days	그날들	Sang-gu	Gyeonggi Arts Center Main Theater	August 2–4	
2013	The Days	그날들	Sang-gu	Centum City Sohyang Theater Shinhan Card Hall	August 15–18	
2013	The Days	그날들	Sang-gu	Ansan Culture & Arts Center Haedoji Theater	August 23–25	
2013–2014	The Wedding Singer	웨딩싱어	Sammy	Doosan Art Center Yeongang Hall	November 26, 2013 - February 9, 2014	
2014	The Goddess Is Watching	여신님이 보고 계셔	Shin Seok-gu	Doosan Art Center Yeongang Hall	April 26, 2014 - July 27, 2014	
2014	The Goddess Is Watching	여신님이 보고 계셔	Shin Seok-gu	Goyang Eoullimnuri Eoullim Theater	November 14 to 16, 2014	
2015	Log Number	로기수	Bae Cheol-sik	YES24 Stage 1	March 12 – May 31, 2015	
2015	Joint Security Area (JSA)	공동경비구역 JSA	Jeon Woo-jin (Soldier)	Yes24 Stage 1	September 18 to December 6	
2015	Bachelor Vegetable Shop	총각네 야채가게	Yun-min	KEPCO Art Center	November 13 – December 31	
2016	The Days	그날들	Sang-gu	Chungmu Art Center Grand Theater	Aug 25 – November 3	
2016	The Days	그날들	Sang-gu	Daegu Keimyung Art Center	November 12–13	
2016	The Days	그날들	Sang-gu	Centum City Sohyang Theater Shinhan Card Hall Busan	December 2–4	
2016	The Days	그날들	Sang-gu	Gyeonggi Arts Center Grand Theater Suwon	December 10–11	
2016	The Days	그날들	Sang-gu	Guri Art Hall Cosmos Grand Theater	December 16–17	
2016	The Days	그날들	Sang-gu	GS Caltex Yeulmaru Grand Theater Yeosu	December 23–25	
2023	The Days	그날들	Sang-gu	Seoul Arts Centre Opera Theatre	July 12 – September 3	
2023	The Days	그날들	Sang-gu	Gangneung Art Center	October 27–29	
2023	The Days	그날들	Sang-gu	Daegu Keimyung Art Center	November 13–15	
2023	The Days	그날들	Sang-gu	Daejeon Arts Center Art Hall	November 17–19	
2023	The Days	그날들	Sang-gu	Gyeonggi Arts Center Main Theater, Suwon	November 25–26	

=== Theater ===
Theater play performances
Year	Title		Role	Venue	Date	Ref.
Year	English	Korean	Role	Venue	Date	Ref.
2009–2010	Shear Madness	쉬어매드니스	Police Inspector	Jiin Theater (formerly Al and Nucleus Theater)	July 11, 2009 to January 3, 2010	
2010	Shear Madness	쉬어매드니스	Police Inspector	Sangmyung Art Hall	January 12 to 31, 2010	
2010–2011	Shear Madness	쉬어매드니스	Police Inspector	Sangmyung Art Hall	February 2, 2010 to January 9, 2011	
2013	Model Students	모범생들	Kim Myeong-jun	Daehakno Free Theatre	May 31 – Sep 29	
2014	Divorced Sangtae	바람난 삼대	Grandfather, Father, Son	Ulsan Hyundai Art Center Small Performance Hall	May 14, 2014 - May 31, 2014	
2014	Divorced Sangtae	바람난 삼대	Grandfather, Father, Son	Sangmyung Art Hall #1	February 7, 2014 - August 31, 2014	
2014	The Purloined Book	도둑맞은 책	Cho Yeong-rak	Chungmu Art Center Small Theater Blue	August 29, 2014 - September 21, 2014	
2015	Hot Summer	뜨거운 여름	Ji-nan	Daehak-ro Jayu Theater	August 11 to November 1	
2016	Almost, Maine	올모스트 메인	Randall	Sangmyung Art Hall 1	January 8 to July 3, 2016	
2016	Voice of Millennium	보이스 오브 밀레니엄	Ji-hoon	Dongsung Art Center Small Theater	November 5 to December 31, 2016	
2017	New Humanity's 100% Debate	신인류의 백분토론	Na Dae-su	Arko Arts Theater Small Theater	February 10 to 26	
2017	New Humanity's 100% Debate	신인류의 백분토론	Na Dae-su	Art One Theater 3	May 19 to July 9	
2017	New Humanity's 100% Debate	신인류의 백분토론	Na Dae-su	Goyang Aram Nuri Sara Sae Theater	July 15 to 22	
2017	Model Students	모범생들	Kim Myung-joon	Daehak-ro Dream Art Centre 4	June 4 – Aug 27	
2017–2018	Millennium Boys	밀레니엄 소년단	Ji-hoon	Dongsung Art Centre Dongsungso Theatre	December 1 to February 4	
2019	Hot Summer	뜨거운 여름	Jae-hee	Goyang Aram Nuri Sara Sae Theater	April 6 to 14	
2019	Hot Summer	뜨거운 여름	Jae-hee	Yes24 Stage 3	May 17 to June 30	

== Awards and nominations ==
Name of the award ceremony, year presented, category, nominee of the award, and the result of the nomination
Award ceremony	Year	Category	Nominee / Work	Result	Ref.
SBS Drama Awards	2023	Best Supporting Actor in a Miniseries Romance/Comedy Drama	My Demon	Won	
