= Beautiful Vampire =

2018 film

- Theatrical release poster
- Hangul: 뷰티풀 뱀파이어
- RR: Byutipul baempaieo
- MR: Pyut'ip'ul paemp'aiŏ
- Directed by: Jeong Eun-gyeong
- Written by: Park Se-rim; Jeong Eun-gyeong
- Produced by: Kim Ji-yeon
- Starring: Jung Yeon-joo; Song Kang
- Production company: Siren Pictures Inc.
- Distributed by: Cine Guru by Kidari ENT, M-Line Distribution
- Release dates: July 13, 2018 (Bucheon); October 8, 2018
- Running time: 73 minutes
- Country: South Korea
- Language: Korean

Beautiful Vampire is a 2018 South Korean fantasy romance film starring Jung Yeon-joo and Song Kang. This film is a re-release of the oksusu's web series with more cuts. It was released on October 8, 2018.

== Plot ==
Ran is a 500-year-old vampire who chooses to live an ordinary life among human beings, despite having powers such as speed. She runs a make-up shop in the neighborhood of Mangwon in Seoul, but her life is still different compared to other women as she does not age and needs animal blood to survive. Things change when Lee So-nyeon, the new landlord's son, falls in love with Ran: her appetite for human blood comes back.

== Cast ==
- Jung Yeon-joo as Ran
- Song Kang as Lee So-nyeon
- Park Jun-myun as Kang Mool-joo
- Lee Yong-nyeo as Ok-bun

== Release ==
The film premiered at the 2018 Bucheon International Fantastic Film Festival in the category Korean Fantastic: Features (Non-Competition) on July 13, 2018.

== Critical reception ==
Pierce Conran of Screen Anarchy gave the following review: "Despite its appealing cocktail of quirk and genre conventions, Beautiful Vampire never quite goes beyond its modest ambitions as a light combination of popular genre conventions and lowbrow dramedy. Even at a svelte 72 minutes, it doesn't take long for the undemanding story and simplistic side characters to fall into repetitive patterns."
