= My Demon =

2023–2024 South Korean television series

- Promotional poster
- Hangul: 마이 데몬
- RR: Mai demon
- MR: Mai temon
- Genre: Fantasy; Romantic drama
- Developed by: Lee Kwang-soon (planning)
- Written by: Choi Ah-il
- Directed by: Kim Jang-han; Kwon Da-som
- Starring: Kim You-jung; Song Kang; Lee Sang-yi; Kim Hae-sook; Jo Hye-joo
- Country of origin: South Korea
- Original language: Korean
- No. of episodes: 16

Production
- Producers: Lee Jae-woo; Yoon Geon-hee; Ahn Young-in
- Running time: 66 minutes
- Production companies: Studio S; Binge Works

Original release
- Network: SBS TV
- Release: November 24, 2023 – January 20, 2024

My Demon (Korean: 마이 데몬) is a South Korean television series starring Kim You-jung, Song Kang, Lee Sang-yi, Kim Hae-sook, and Jo Hye-joo. It aired on SBS TV from November 24, 2023, to January 20, 2024, every Friday and Saturday at 22:00 (KST). It is also available for streaming on Wavve in South Korea, and on Netflix in selected regions.

== Synopsis ==
The series depicts the story of a fateful encounter between Do Do-hee (Kim You-jung), a haughty but organised heiress of a conglomerate, and Jeong Gu-won (Song Kang), a demon who is cold and carefree, and who temporarily loses his powers. The couple embark on a contract marriage, agreeing to help each. Over time, their relationship begins to evolve into romance, but not any sooner than they each realise their romance may be dangerous to the other.

== Cast ==
=== Main ===
- Kim You-jung as Do Do-hee and Wolsim
  - Kim Gyu-bin as young Do Do-hee
1. Do Do-hee is the CEO of Mirae F&B. After her parents died when she was 11 years old, she was adopted by Ju Cheon-sook, the chairwoman of Mirae Group.
2. Wolsim is a courtesan in the Joseon era who fell in love with Seo Yi-sun.
- Song Kang as Jeong Gu-won and Seo Yi-sun
1. Jeong Gu-won is a 200-year-old demon who plots tempting soul-binding contracts with humans, exploiting their vulnerabilities.
2. Seo Yi-sun is a young master in the Joseon era who fell in love with Wolsim.
- Lee Sang-yi as Joo Seok-hoon

Cheon-sook's nephew and CEO of Mirae Investment, an affiliate of Mirae Group.

- Kim Hae-sook as Joo Cheon-sook

The founder and chairwoman of Mirae Group.

=== Supporting cast ===
- Kim Seol-jin as Gi Gwang-chol (Masked Intruder)

=== Supporting ===
Mirae Group

- Kim Tae-hoon as Noh Seok-min

Cheon-sook's first son who is CEO of Mirae Electronics.

- Lee Yoon-ji as Noh Soo-ah

Cheon-sook's second daughter who is CEO of Mirae Apparel.

- Jo Yeon-hee as Kim Se-ra

Seok-min's wife who is the managing director of Mirae Electronics.

- Kang Seung-ho as Noh Do-gyeong

Seok-min and Se-ra's only son who is the head of Mirae Electronics.

- Park Do-yoon as Austin

Soo-an's son and Justin's twin brother.

- Kang Da-on as Justin

Soo-an's son and Austin's twin brother.

Sunwol Foundation

- Jo Hye-joo as Jin Ga-young

A dancer whose specialty is traditional double-sword martial arts.

- Heo Jeong-do as Park Bok-gyu

The director of Sunwol Foundation who was Goo-won's first contractor 200 years ago.

Mirae F&B

- Seo Jeong-yeon as Secretary Shin Da-Jeong

Do-hee's secretary.

- Park Jin-woo as Han Min-soo

A team leader of Mirae F&B's public relations.

- Lee Ji-won as Choi Jung-mi

An assistant manager of Mirae F&B's public relations.

- Hong Jin-ki as Lee Han-Seong

A new employee of Mirae F&B's public relations.

Other

- Cha Chung-hwa as a homeless woman who was later revealed as the God.

=== Extended ===
- Kim Young-jae as Do-hee's father
- Woo Hee-jin as Do-hee's mother
- Kim Seol-jin as Gi Gwang-cheol
- Kim Beop-rae as a boss
- Jeong Soon-won as number two
- Lim Cheol-hyung as Detective Park
- Jeon Sok-chan as Detective Oh
- Seo Sang-won as Pastor Michael
- Joo Suk-tae as Cha Tae-jun
- Lee Kang-wook as Do-hee's blind date

== Production ==
=== Casting ===
On January 18, 2023, it was reported that both Kim You-jung and Song Kang have been considering the offers to star in the drama. On April 14, 2023, actor Lee Sang-yi confirmed his appearance in the drama and was preparing for filming.

=== Filming ===
The first script reading was held on April 12, 2023.

== Original soundtrack ==
=== Part 1 ===
Released on November 24, 2023
No.	Title	Lyrics	Music	Artist	Length
1.	"Our Night Is More Beautiful Than Your Day" (우리의 밤은 당신의 낮보다 아름답다)	Bae Young-jun	Bae Young-jun	NewJeans	3:12
2.	"Our Night Is More Beautiful Than Your Day" (우리의 밤은 당신의 낮보다 아름답다; Inst.)		Bae Young-jun		3:12
Total length:					6:24

=== Part 2 ===
Released on December 1, 2023
No.	Title	Lyrics	Music	Artist	Length
1.	"Whenever, Wherever" (그대가 있는 곳, 언제 어디든)	Lee Ki-hwan; More	Lee Ki-hwan; More; Go Hyeong-eun	Roy Kim	3:41
2.	"Whenever, Wherever" (그대가 있는 곳, 언제 어디든; Inst.)		Lee Ki-hwan; More; Go Hyeong-eun		3:41
Total length:					7:22

=== Part 3 ===
Released on December 8, 2023
No.	Title	Lyrics	Music	Artist	Length
1.	"With You"	Hana	Tom and Jerry	Winter	4:15
2.	"With You" (Inst.)		Tom and Jerry		4:15
Total length:					8:30

=== Part 4 ===
Released on December 9, 2023
No.	Title	Lyrics	Music	Artist	Length
1.	"Even If We Disappear" (우리 사라져도)	Kim Woon-jin; Lee Seong-geun	Kim Woon-jin; Lee Seong-geun	Dawn	3:57
2.	"Even If We Disappear" (우리 사라져도; Inst.)		Kim Woon-jin; Lee Seong-geun		3:57
Total length:					7:54

=== Part 5 ===
Released on December 15, 2023
No.	Title	Lyrics	Music	Artist	Length
1.	"Say You Love Me" (그대라는 봄)	Jang Hyun Ki; Ruiz; Wooh!; Kim Jong Heon (Psycho Tension)	Wooh!; Ruiz; Kim Jong Heon (Psycho Tension)	Sam Kim	3:32
2.	"Say You Love Me" (그대라는 봄; Inst.)		Wooh!; Ruiz; Kim Jong Heon (Psycho Tension)		3:32
Total length:					7:04

=== Part 6 ===
Released on December 23, 2023
No.	Title	Lyrics	Music	Artist	Length
1.	"TRUE"	Leafia (20Hz); Park Seul Gi (20Hz)	Park Seul Gi (20Hz)	Yoari	3:13
2.	"TRUE" (Inst.)		Park Seul Gi (20Hz)		3:13
Total length:					6:26

=== Part 7 ===
No.	Title	Artist	Length
1.	"The way to lose you"	10cm	4:21

=== Part 8 ===
Released on January 12, 2024
No.	Title	Lyrics	Music	Artist	Length
1.	"Lasting Like The Last Day" (오늘이 마지막인 것처럼)	Kim Won	Kim Won; Lim Ji Soo; Shim In Yong	Kang Min Kyung	3:55
2.	"Lasting Like The Last Day" (오늘이 마지막인 것처럼; Inst.)		Kim Won; Lim Ji Soo; Shim In Yong		3:55
Total length:					7:10

== Reception ==
Singapore's national newspaper The Straits Times gave My Demon four out of five stars, praising the series for its cast and execution of the plot, and the good chemistry between the lead cast members Song Kang and Kim You-jung. The series ranked second on Netflix's Global Top 10 TV (Non-English) category. It was also the eighth most searched show on Google Philippines for 2024.

=== Viewership ===
My Demon : South Korea viewers per episode (thousands)

Season	Episode number																Average
Season	1	2	3	4	5	6	7	8	9	10	11	12	13	14	15	16	Average
1	803	657	829	738	667	833	845	878	N/A	N/A	788	N/A	752	753	711	727	N/A

Source: Audience measurement performed nationwide by Nielsen Korea.

Average TV viewership ratings
Ep.	Original broadcast date	Average audience share		
Ep.	Original broadcast date	Nielsen Korea		TNmS
Ep.	Original broadcast date	Nationwide	Seoul	Nationwide
1	November 24, 2023	4.5% (11th)	5.1% (8th)	N/A
2	November 25, 2023	3.4% (20th)	3.4% (19th)	2.9% (20th)
3	December 1, 2023	4.2% (13th)	4.4% (11th)	3.5% (18th)
4	December 2, 2023	4.0% (14th)	4.0% (16th)	3.5% (18th)
5	December 8, 2023	3.4% (19th)	3.6% (17th)	N/A
6	December 9, 2023	4.7% (9th)	5.1% (5th)	N/A
7	December 15, 2023	4.5% (11th)	5.2% (8th)	3.8% (19th)
8	December 16, 2023	4.7% (13th)	5.0% (12th)	N/A
9	December 22, 2023	4.2% (16th)	N/A	N/A
10	December 23, 2023	3.8% (18th)	N/A	N/A
11	January 5, 2024	3.7% (20th)	3.9% (15th)	N/A
12	January 6, 2024	2.9% (23rd)	N/A	N/A
13	January 12, 2024	3.6% (17th)	3.7% (14th)	N/A
14	January 13, 2024	3.4% (21st)	3.7% (14th)	N/A
15	January 19, 2024	3.7% (17th)	4.0% (13th)	N/A
16	January 20, 2024	3.5% (20th)	3.7% (15th)	
Average		3.9%	— (Note: Due to multiple unpublished ratings, the exact average rating is unknown.)	—
In the table above, the blue numbers represent the lowest ratings and the red numbers represent the highest ratings.; N/A denotes ratings that were not published.

== Awards and nominations ==
Name of the award ceremony, year presented, category, nominee of the award, and the result of the nomination
Award ceremony	Year	Category	Nominee / Work	Result	Ref.
SBS Drama Awards	2023	Top Excellence Award, Actor in a Miniseries Romance/Comedy Drama	Song Kang	Won	
SBS Drama Awards	2023	Top Excellence Award, Actress in a Miniseries Romance/Comedy Drama	Kim You-jung	Won	
SBS Drama Awards	2023	Best Couple Award	Song Kang and Kim You-jung	Won	
SBS Drama Awards	2023	Best Supporting Actress in a Miniseries Romance/Comedy Drama	Seo Jeong-yeon	Won	
SBS Drama Awards	2023	Best Supporting Actor in a Miniseries Romance/Comedy Drama	Jeong Soon-won	Won	
SBS Drama Awards	2023	Best Supporting Actress in a Miniseries Romance/Comedy Drama	Lee Yoon-ji	Nominated	
SBS Drama Awards	2023	Best Supporting Actor in a Miniseries Romance/Comedy Drama	Heo Jung-do	Nominated	
SBS Drama Awards	2023	Scene Stealer Award	Kim Cheol-jin	Nominated	
SBS Drama Awards	2023	Excellence Award, Actor in a Miniseries Romance/Comedy Drama	Kim Tae-hoon	Nominated	
