= Hwang Bo-reum-byeol =

South Korean actress (born 1999)

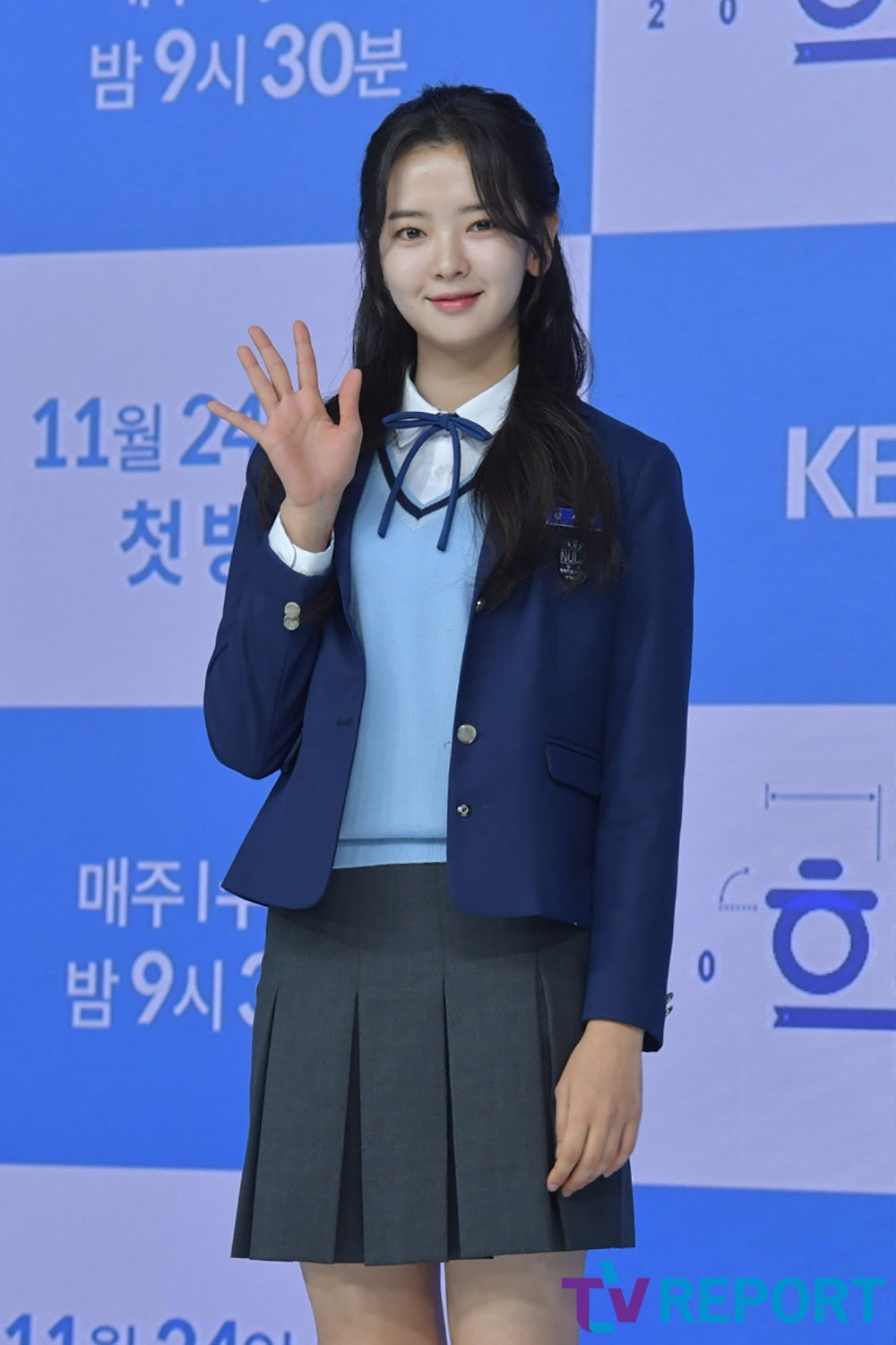
- Hwang in November 2021
- Born: December 21, 1999 (age 26); Changwon, South Korea
- Occupations: Actress; model
- Years active: 2020–present
- Agent: Npio Entertainment

Korean name
- Hangul: 황보름별
- Hanja: 黃보름별
- RR: Hwang Boreumbyeol
- MR: Hwang Porŭmbyŏl
- Website: npioe.com

Hwang Bo-reum-byeol (Korean: 황보름별, born December 21, 1999), is a South Korean actress and model. She began her acting career with Naver TV's web series, The World of My 17 (2020).

== Early life ==
Hwang was born on December 21, 1999, in Changwon, South Korea. She is the winner of the 2019 Miss Chunhyang beauty pageant.

== Career ==
In November 2024, Hwang signed an exclusive contract with Npio Entertainment.

== Filmography ==
=== Film ===
Year	Title	Role	Notes	Ref.
2020	Departure, Sun	Sony	Short film	
2023	The Point Men	Kim Hye Young		
2024	Uprising	Jong Ryeo's wife		

=== Television series ===
Year	Title	Role	Notes	Ref.
2021	School 2021	Kang Seo-young		
2022	Thirty-Nine	Actress student	Cameo (Ep.3)	
2022	Dear.M	Choi Ro-sa		
2023	The Secret Romantic Guesthouse	Ban-ya		
2023–2024	Maestra: Strings of Truth	Lee Ru-na		
2025	Oh My Ghost Clients	Jo Eun-young	Special appearance	
2026	Phantom Lawyer	Han So-hyun		

=== Web series ===
Year	Title	Role	Notes	Ref.
2020	The World of My 17	Im Yoo-na		
2020	Can I Step In?	Alex Soo-kyung		
2021	So Not Worth It	Ji-eun	Cameo (Ep.11)	
2021	The World of My 17 2	Im Yoo-na		
2025	History of Scruffiness	Choi Hee-sun		
2025	Love.exe	Ju Yeon-san		

== Awards and nominations ==
Name of the award ceremony, year presented, category, nominee of the award, and the result of the nomination
Award ceremony	Year	Category	Nominee / Work	Result	Ref.
KBS Drama Awards	2021	Best New Actress	School 2021	Nominated	
SBS Drama Awards	2023	Excellence Award, Actress in a Miniseries Romance/Comedy Drama	The Secret Romantic Guesthouse	Nominated	
