= Jung Gun-joo =

South Korean actor (born 1995)

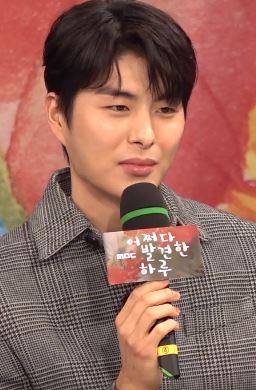
- Jung in 2019
- Born: May 26, 1995 (age 31); Busan, South Korea
- Occupation: Actor
- Years active: 2017–present
- Agent: Saram Entertainment

Korean name
- Hangul: 정건주
- RR: Jeong Geonju
- MR: Chŏng Kŏnju

Jung Gun-joo (Korean: 정건주; born May 26, 1995) is a South Korean actor. He has starred in several web dramas before venturing into TV broadcasts.

== Career ==
In 2017, Jung Gun-joo signed an exclusive contract with JYP Entertainment and made an appearance in DAY6's music video "I Like You". He starred in a web-drama by Naver Flower Ever After.

In 2019, Jung joined Blossom Entertainment and acted as one of the main cast of Extraordinary You.And that made him more well-known.

In 2023, Jung made his debut in the sports film Rebound.he later appeared in an SBS historical drama The Secret Romantic Guesthouse

In 2024, Jung signed with Saram Entertainment after his contract with his previous agency expired.. He also appeared in the MBC drama Bitter Sweet Hell alongside Kim Hee-sun. Later, Jung appeared in the KBS Drama Special – The Road in Between, a short drama, alongside Choi Hee-jin.

== Personal life ==
Jung served in the mandatory military service at the age of 21 during his university days. He also has a barista license based on his experience working part-time at a coffee shop. Before becoming an actor, Jung studied mechanical engineering and modeled to earn pocket money.

== Filmography ==
=== Film ===
Year	Title	Role	Ref.
2023	Rebound	Jung Kang-ho	

=== Television series ===
Year	Title	Role	Notes	Ref.
2018	KBS Drama Special	Joo Woo-jin	Episode: The Tuna and the Dolphin	
2019	Extraordinary You	Lee Do-Hwa		
2020	Oh My Baby	Choi-Kang Eu-ddeum		
2021	True Beauty	Ryu Hyung-jin	Cameo (Episode 7)	
2021	Monthly Magazine Home	Shin Gyeom	Support role	
2022	Three Bold Siblings	Actor	Cameo (Episode 11 & 12)	
2022	Kiss Sixth Sense	Ye-sool's ex-boyfriend	Cameo (Episode 1)	
2023	The Secret Romantic Guesthouse	Jeong Yu-ha		
2024	Bitter Sweet Hell	Moon Tae-oh	Support role	
2024	KBS Drama Special	Won Seo-hu	Episode: The Road in Between	
2024	Check-in Hanyang	Cheon Jun-hwa		
2025	Way Back Love	Lee Hong-seok	Support role	
2026	XO, Kitty	Tae-Oh	Cameo (Episode 1 & 3)	

=== Web series ===
Year	Title	Role	Notes	Ref.
2018	Flower Ever After	Choi Woong		
2018	A-Teen	Physical education student teacher	Cameo (episode 6)	
2018	WHY	Cha Yeon-woo		
2019	The Best Ending	Choi Woong		
2020	Ending Again	Choi Woong	Cameo	

=== Web shows ===
Year	Title	Role	Notes	Ref.
2018	I Oppa Don't Know	Cast Member	Studio Lulu Lala	

=== Music video appearances ===
Year	Title	Artist	Ref.
2017	"I Like You" (좋아합니다)	Day6	

== Awards and nominations ==
Name of the award ceremony, year presented, category, nominee of the award, and the result of the nomination
Award ceremony	Year	Category	Nominee / Work	Result	Ref.
APAN Star Awards	2025	Excellence Award, Actor in a Short Drama or Web Drama	The Road in Between	Won	
MBC Drama Awards	2019	Best New Actor	Extraordinary You	Nominated	
SBS Drama Awards	2023	Excellence Award, Actor in a Miniseries Romance/Comedy Drama	The Secret Romantic Guesthouse	Nominated	
