= Nation's Little Sister =

South Korean informal title

Nation's Little Sister (Korean: 국민 여동생) or Nation's Little Brother (Korean: 국민 남동생) is an informal title in South Korean entertainment industry. It refers to "a young female [or male] celebrity in her [or his] late teens to early twenties... [who is] cute, bright, and innocent."

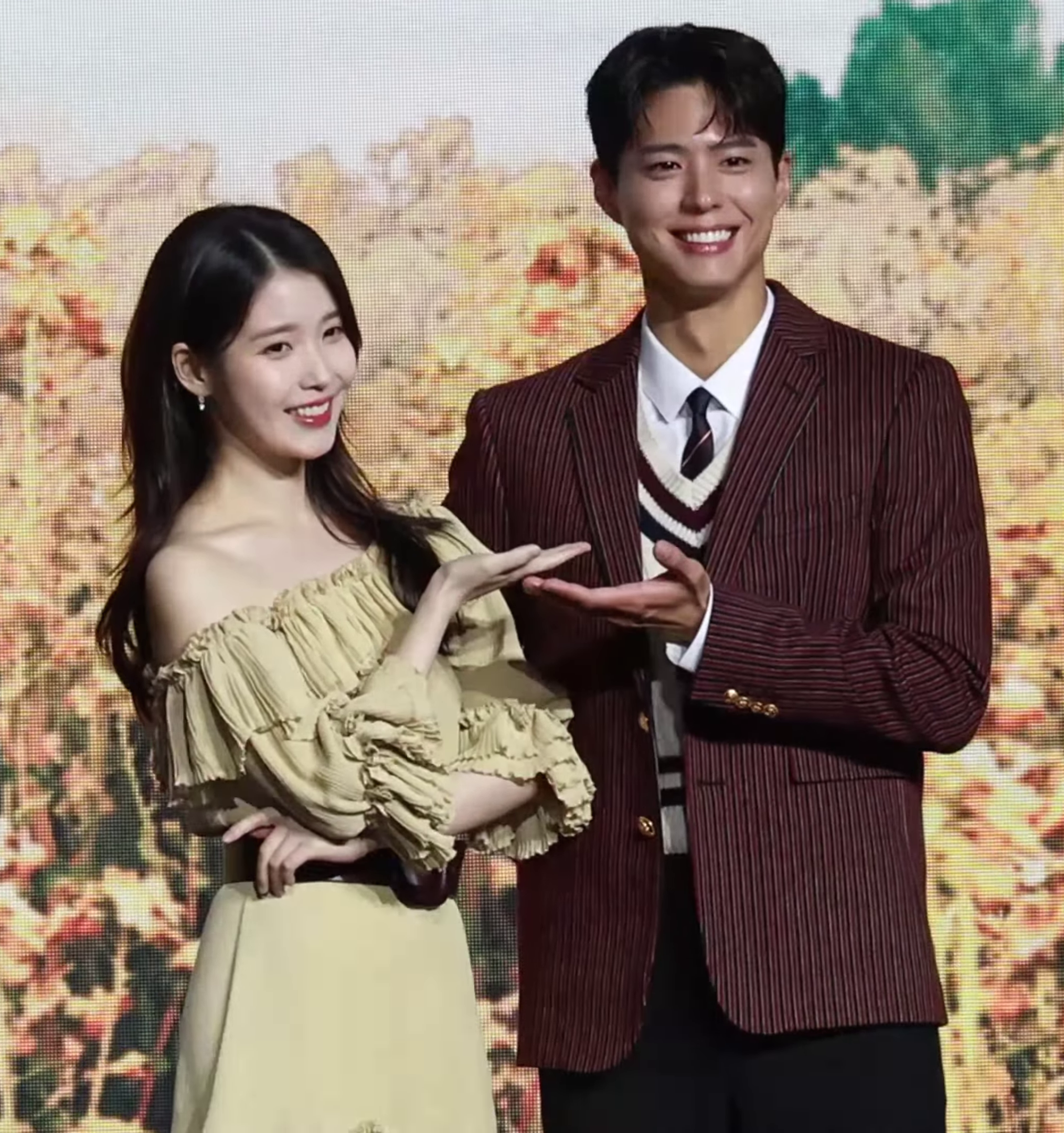
IU (left) and Park Bo-gum (right) have been called Nation's Little Sister and Nation's Little Brother, respectively, early in their careers

== People associated with the title ==
=== Nation's Little Sister ===
- Im Ye-jin (born 1960), actress
- Lee Sang-ah (born 1972), actress
- Lee Jae-eun (born 1980), actress and singer
- Jang Na-ra (born 1981), singer and actress
- Yoon Eun-hye (born 1984), singer and actress
- Moon Geun-young (born 1987), actress and model
- Park Bo-young (born 1990), actress
- Park Shin-hye (born 1990), actress and singer
- Yuna Kim (born 1990), figure skater
- Ahn So-hee (born 1992), actress and singer
- Kim Ji-won (born 1992), actress and model
- IU (born 1993), singer-songwriter and actress
- Son Yeon-jae (born 1994), rhythmic gymnast
- Lee Hye-ri (born 1994), actress and singer
- Kim Hye-yoon (born 1996), actress
- Kim So-hyun (born 1999), actress
- Kim You-jung (born 1999), actress
- Kim Sae-ron (2000–2025), actress
- Shin Eun-soo (born 2002), actress
- Lee Won-hee (born 2007), singer

=== Nation's Little Brother ===
- Lee Seung-gi (born 1987), singer, actor and host
- Kim Sung-cheol (born 1991), actor
- Park Bo-gum (born 1993), actor
- Yoo Seung-ho (born 1993), actor
- Yeo Jin-goo (born 1997), actor

== Other usages ==
- People's Little Sister (Korean: 국민 여동생) is a song by South Korean girl group Sonamoo from their debut extended play, Deja Vu.

== See also ==
- Nation's First Love
