= Youth of May =

2021 South Korean television series

- Promotional poster
- Hangul: 오월의 청춘
- Hanja: 五月의 靑春
- RR: Oworui cheongchun
- MR: Owŏrŭi ch'ŏngch'un
- Genre: Melodrama; Period drama
- Created by: Moon Jun-ha (KBS Drama Production)
- Written by: Lee Kang
- Directed by: Song Min-yeob
- Starring: Lee Do-hyun; Go Min-si; Lee Sang-yi; Keum Sae-rok
- Country of origin: South Korea
- Original language: Korean
- No. of episodes: 12 (24 parts)

Production
- Executive producer: Kim Sang-hwi
- Producers: Ahn Chang-hyun; Kang Bo-young
- Camera setup: Single-camera
- Running time: 70 minutes
- Production company: Story Hunter Production

Original release
- Network: KBS2; Wavve
- Release: May 3 – June 8, 2021

Youth of May (Korean: 오월의 청춘) is a 2021 South Korean television series starring Lee Do-hyun, Go Min-si, Lee Sang-yi, and Keum Sae-rok. It premiered on KBS2 on May 3, 2021, and aired every Monday and Tuesday at 21:30 (KST) until June 8, 2021, for 12 episodes. It is an original drama of OTT media service Wavve and is available for streaming on its platform.

== Synopsis ==
Youth of May is set in the year 1980 during the Gwangju Uprising, follows the love story of medical student Hwang Hee-tae (Lee Do-hyun) and nurse Kim Myung-hee (Go Min-si). Rather than focusing on the frontline of the Gwangju Uprising, the drama is about the love and friendships of young people who would've had ordinary lives otherwise.

Hwang Hee-tae (Lee Do-hyun) becomes the pride of Gwangju when he enters Seoul National University College of Medicine with top marks. His best friend Kyung-soo (Kwon Young-chan), an avid pro-democracy activist, insists they open an illegal clinic for students on the run from the government. One day, a factory worker is injured during a protest. In exchange for the costs of discreetly transporting himself and the factory worker to his hometown, Hee-tae must go to a meeting with a potential marriage partner arranged by his father. At this meeting, Hee-tae meets Myung-hee (Go Min-si), a nurse persevering through the hardships of life. She only agrees to go to this meeting in place of her friend Soo-ryeon (Keum Sae-rok), because she needs to come up with the airfare to go study in Germany. However, Myung-hee and Hee-tae end up falling in love.

In May 1980, amidst the heated passion and cries for democracy that reverberate throughout Gwangju, Hee-tae and Myung-hee find themselves in a twist of fate.

== Cast ==
=== Main ===
- Lee Do-hyun as Hwang Hee-tae
  - Choi Won-young as elder Hwang Hee-tae

Hwang Gi-nam's son and Song Hae-ryeong's stepson. A medical student who has a sly and mischievous side, but is determined and goal oriented underneath. Although Hwang Hee-tae entered Seoul National University's medical school with top scores, he postpones his graduation due to a trauma. Hee-tae appears to be carefree and lighthearted, but he's a figure who is more thoughtful than anyone else on the inside.

- Go Min-si as Kim Myung-hee

Kim Hyeon-cheol's only daughter. A nurse three years into her career, Myung-hee is a fighter who has already gone through all sorts of hardships in her young life. When facing injustice, she isn't afraid to stand up to her superiors at the hospital, and no matter what difficulties life throws her way, she determinedly chases her dream. Additionally, despite her relatively young age, Myung-hee is a responsible breadwinner who works hard to scrape a living and sends money to her younger brother back home. After crossing paths with Hee-tae, Myung-hee begins to change in subtle ways and shows new sides of herself.

- Lee Sang-yi as Lee Soo-chan

Brother of Soo-ryeon and Lee Chang-geun's son, he is a businessman who works at a trading company after returning from his studies in France. With a three-year age gap, he is the oldest child, who places more importance on family than on himself. Soo-chan relates with Myung-hee because she similarly faces hardships as the head of a household.

- Keum Sae-rok as Lee Soo-ryeon

Soo-chan's sister and Lee Chang-geun's daughter. A law student who desperately fights for social justice, because she feels responsibility for coming from a wealthy family. Soo-ryeon is a longtime friend of Myung-hee. While trying to help her friend with her dream, she finds herself starting an unexpected relationship with someone that leaves her conflicted.

=== Supporting ===
==== Hwang Hee-tae's family ====
- Oh Man-seok as Hwang Gi-nam

Hwang Hee-tae's power-obsessed father and Song Hae-ryeong's husband.

- Shim Yi-young as Song Hae-ryeong

Hwang Gi-nam's second wife and Hee-tae's stepmother. The only daughter of a famous brewing company.

- Choi Seung-hoon as Hwang Jang-tae

Hee-tae's half-brother and Myung-soo's friend.

==== Kim Myung-hee's family ====
- Kim Won-hae as Kim Hyeon-cheol

Kim Myung-hee's father and Choi Soon-nyeo's husband. A watch repairman with a dodgy leg.

- Hwang Young-hee as Choi Soon-nyeo

Kim Myung-hee's mother and Kim Hyeon-cheol's wife. A housewife who took care of her sick husband and mother-in-law while raising Myung-hee and Myung-soo.

- Jo Yi-hyun as Kim Myung-soo

Myung-hee's younger brother. Born a late child and raised in love, an innocent child. South Jeolla Province's national 1,000-meter runner will compete in the boys' event. He is good at running since he was young, and he always ran the relay as a class representative whenever there was a sports day. He's a deep-seated child who's trying to mediate between his father and his sister. He's a 12-year-old boy who can't even tie his shoelaces.

- Park Hye-jin as Myung-hee's grandmother.

==== Lee Soo-chan and Lee Soo-ryeon's family ====
- Um Hyo-sup as Lee Chang-geun

Lee Soo-chan and Lee Soo-ryeon's father. A successful businessman who lost his wife due to a chronic illness and raised the children alone.

- Hong Boo-hyang as Lee Soo-chan and Lee Soo-ryeon's aunt. A housemaid.

==== Pyeonghwa Hospital ====
- Park Chul-min as Choi Byeong-gil

Vice President of Pyeonghwa Hospital. On behalf of the president of the Royal Family hospital. He is in charge of various hospital affairs and decisions.

- Kim Bo-jung as Kim Min-ju

A nurse in the emergency room of Pyeonghwa Hospital. Myung-hee's 1-year senior and military base. Due to heavy emergency room work stress, they are constantly demanding staffing.

- Kim Yi-kyung as Oh In-yeong

A new nurse in the emergency room of Pyeonghwa Hospital. Myung-hee's direct junior (precepti). As a chic nurse who just graduated from nursing college, she is still a part of her daily routine.

- Jang Won-hyeok as Yoo Byeong-cheol

A resident of the emergency room of Pyeonghwa Hospital. Subtracted suffers from overwork due to the work his seniors left behind, and he regrets choosing his major every night. Even though his personality is not caring, thanks to his personality that does not cross the line. Compared to other doctors, he communicates best with nurses.

==== Military ====
- Kwon Young-chan as Kim Kyung-soo

Private. Hee-tae's college friend and martial law army deployed in Gwangju. He was arrested while attending the Department of Korean Language Education at Seoul National University and was forced to enlist. A discarded animal, a flower blooming on the side of the road. In the military, they are treated as "advisors". He has endured day by day from senior harassment and intense training in Chungcheong.

- Kim Eun-soo as Lee Kwang-gu

Corporal. The only person who takes care of Kyung-soo, the "advisor" through the opposition of Kyung-soo. When he tried luck and failed the entrance exam, he enlisted in Hyeon-gim instead of Samsu. Born from Gyeongsang-do's father and Jeolla-do's mother. He is proficient in both dialects, but because of the senior sergeant who has a seizure in Jeolla-do, he has been serving in Gyeongsang Province for several years, pretending to be from Gyeongsang Province.

- Noh Sang-bo as Hong Sang-pyo

Sergeant. The tyrant of the quarter grabbing Kyung-soo like a rat. Everyone is praying for a quick campaign through his vicious conduct. The date of dismissal is getting postponed after going to the brig because of the middle-severe harshness.

==== Boarding House ====
- Park Se-hyun as Lee Jin-ah

Boarding house owner's daughter. A cheeful high school student who has a crush on Hee-tae. She likes pop music and dreams of becoming a radio producer in Seoul.

- Heo Jung-do as Lee Kyung-pil

The boarding house owner. Originally from Jinju, he lived in Gwangju for over 20 years. A Gyeongsang-do man living in Gwangju even after his wife and a native of Gwangju died. With the title of a boarding house owner, he rejoices that he is doing "lease" somewhere. As a housekeeper in charge of virtually all kinds of housework, he specializes in washing stains and cooking soup.

=== Others ===
- Jung Wook-jin as Choi Jeong-haeng

A passionate constable. An avid chic cop full of mistakes but full of motivation. When it comes to torch demonstrations or street demonstrations, he takes the lead in "citizen's guard". Before he was a policeman, he was just one citizen, a native of Gwangju.

- Lee Hwang-eui as Han Suk-joong

An influential person working as a lawmaker in Jeonnam. The maintenance of the area that was born and raised in the family, which has been one by one since the Japanese colonial period. His survival strategy is to keenly catch the flow of power and find an "appropriate" position. It is a great pride to be an elder of a large church, and his wife is also active as a governor. Hwang Gi-nam, who bends like a tongue in his mouth, serves as a bridge to meet 'big hands'.

- Lee Kyu-sung as Jeong Hye-geon

Hee-tae's only hometown friend and Myung-hee's church friend. He is currently studying Political Science and Diplomacy at Chonnam National University and a member of the movement for democracy.

- Joo Bo-young as Park Seon-min

Myung-hee's friend at the cathedral. She is currently attending the Department of Korean Language and Literature at Chosun University. Taking pictures is her hobby, and she has been learning photography from Hye-geon's father. Her goal is to get a job as a photojournalist at a newspaper in the future.

- Kim Tae-bum as Park Dong-wook

Track and field coach.

- Nam Tae-woo as detective

A detective who obeys Hwang Gi-nam's every order.

- Kim In-seon as Jung Seok-chul

Kim Kyung-soo's girlfriend injured in protests.

=== Special appearances ===
- Kim Hyun as Aunt
- Park Ah-sung as Ah-seong
- Kwon Eun-bin as Yu-jin

Hwang Hee-tae's ex-girlfriend (Ep. 1)

- Kwon Hyuk-hyun as In-jae

Hwang Hee-tae's university senior (Ep. 1).

- Yoo Soon-woong as Priest (Ep. 1)
- Bae Sung-il as Chief (Ep. 1)
- Oh Kyu-taek as Used car dealer (Ep. 1)
- Kwak Ja-hyoung as Sang-gon (Ep. 1)
- Lee Joong-yul as Mr. Kim (Ep. 1)
- Jung Ji-ahn as Bus attendant (Ep. 2)
- Jin Yong-wook as Hyun-chul (Ep. 2)
- Gu Da-song as Bo-yeon (Ep. 3 & 9)
- Lee Young-jin as Doctor (Ep. 3)
- Choi Nam-wook as Taxi driver (Ep. 8)
- Jang Tae-min as Ambulance driver (Ep. 8)
- Han Myung-hwan as Kim Sung-wook (Ep. 9)
- Jo Ji-hyun as Bus station employee (Ep. 10)
- Park Eun-young as Kim Sung-wook's mother (Ep. 10)
- Ha Sung-min as Kim Sung-wook's father (Ep. 12)
- Sung Ki-yoon as Hwang Jung-tae (older) (Ep. 12)
- Hong Eun-jeong as Hwang Jung-tae's secretary (Ep. 12)
- Kim Ju-yeon as Nurse (Ep. 12)
- Lee Sang-hwa as Violent hospital patient (Ep. 12)
- Jang Do-ha as Lee Seo-on (Ep. 12)
- Jung Hee-tae as Kim Kyung-soo (older) (Ep. 1, 11–12)

== Production ==
On October 6, 2020, Lee Do-hyun and Go Min-si's respective agencies announced that they were in talks for the lead roles. They were confirmed to star in the series on December 21, making it their second collaboration after Sweet Home (2020), along with Lee Sang-yi and Keum Sae-rok in the roles of siblings. Since the drama is set in Gwangju, most of dialogues are spoken in its dialect.

== Original soundtrack ==
Youth of May OST

Soundtrack album by Various artists
- Released: 2021
- Genre: Soundtrack
- Languages: Korean; English
- Labels: Kakao; Music Buddy

=== Part 1 ===
Released on May 3, 2021
No.	Title	Lyrics	Music	Artist	Length
1.	"Melody of Spring" (봄의 멜로디)	Captain Planet; SeoRoi	Captain Planet; SeoRoi	Sondia	3:37
2.	"Melody of Spring" (Inst.)		Captain Planet; SeoRoi		3:37
Total length:					6:74

=== Part 2 ===
Released on May 10, 2021
No.	Title	Lyrics	Music	Artist	Length
1.	"Rest" (쉼)	Borest	Borest	Borest	3:12
2.	"Rest" (Inst.)		Borest		3:12
Total length:					6:24

=== Part 3 ===
Released on May 11, 2021
No.	Title	Lyrics	Music	Artist	Length
1.	"My Spring Days" (나의 오월)	Song Yang-ha; Kim Jae-hyun	Song Yang-ha; Kim Jae-hyun	Kwak Jin-eon	3:34
2.	"My Spring Days" (Inst.)		Song Yang-ha; Kim Jae-hyun		3:34
Total length:					6:68

=== Part 4 ===
Released on May 17, 2021
No.	Title	Lyrics	Music	Artist	Length
1.	"Think of You" (당신생각)	Taibian	Taibian; Kim Jung-woo (TOXIC)	Soyeon (Laboum)	4:00
2.	"Think of You" (Inst.)		Taibian; Kim Jung-woo (TOXIC)		4:00
Total length:					8:00

=== Part 5 ===
Released on May 18, 2021
No.	Title	Lyrics	Music	Artist	Length
1.	"Starry Night" (별이 쏟아지는 밤)	Song, Yangha; Kim, Jaehyun	Song, Yangha; Kim, Jaehyun; Yook, Gayeon	Ryeowook (Super Junior)	4:02
2.	"Starry Night" (Inst.)		Song, Yangha; Kim, Jaehyun; Yook, Gayeon		4:02
Total length:					8:04

=== Part 6 ===
Released on May 24, 2021
No.	Title	Lyrics	Music	Artist	Length
1.	"Days of Memory" (기억의나날)	Han Joon; Park Se-joon	Seo Jae-ha	Jung Joon-il	3:53
2.	"Days of Memory" (Inst.)		Seo Jae-ha		3:53
Total length:					7:06

=== Part 7 ===
Released on May 25, 2021
No.	Title	Lyrics	Music	Artist	Length
1.	"I Regret" (널 사랑한 걸 후회해)	Houdini	Houdini; 667	Houdini	3:36
2.	"I Regret" (Inst.)		Houdini; 667		3:36
Total length:					6:72

=== Part 8 ===
Released on May 31, 2021
No.	Title	Lyrics	Music	Artist	Length
1.	"What I Want to Say to You" (너에게 하고 싶은 말)	Yoo Hae-joon	Yoo Hae-joon	Yoo Hae-joon	3:46
2.	"What I Want to Say to You" (Inst.)		Yoo Hae-joon		3:46
Total length:					6:92

=== Part 9 ===
Released on June 1, 2021
No.	Title	Lyrics	Music	Artist	Length
1.	"Winter of May" (오월의 겨울)	Taibian	Taibian; Kim Jung-woo (TOXIC)	Kim Bum-soo	4:27
2.	"Winter of May" (Inst.)		Taibian; Kim Jung-woo (TOXIC)		4:27
Total length:					8:54

=== Part 10 ===
Released on June 8, 2021
No.	Title	Lyrics	Music	Artist	Length
1.	"Over Memories" (추억 위로)	Kim Chang-rak; ATONE (에이톤); Jeong In-seong	Kim Chang-rak; ATONE (에이톤)	Jeong In-seong	3:53
2.	"Over Memories" (Inst.)		Kim Chang-rak; ATONE (에이톤)		3:53
Total length:					7:06

== Viewership ==
Youth of May : South Korea viewers per episode (thousands)

Season	Episode number											
Season	1	2	3	4	5	6	7	8	9	10	11	12
1	N/A	N/A	861	738	N/A	862	907	957	798	885	927	908

Source: Audience measurement performed nationwide by Nielsen Korea.

Average TV viewership ratings
Ep.	Part	Original broadcast date	Title	Average audience share (nationwide)	
Ep.	Part	Original broadcast date	Title	Nielsen Korea	TNmS
1	1	May 3, 2021	Everyone Running Their Own Race (각자의 달리기; Gakjaui dalligi)	4.4% (NR)	4.8% (NR)
1	2	May 3, 2021	Everyone Running Their Own Race (각자의 달리기; Gakjaui dalligi)	4.9% (NR)	5.7% (16th)
2	1	May 4, 2021	The Shoes That Fit Me (나에게 맞는 신발; Naege manneun sinbal)	3.7% (NR)	N/A
2	2	May 4, 2021	The Shoes That Fit Me (나에게 맞는 신발; Naege manneun sinbal)	4.7% (20th)	5.5% (14th)
3	1	May 10, 2021	Your One Month (당신의 한 달; Dangsinui han dal)	4.0% (NR)	N/A
3	2	May 10, 2021	Your One Month (당신의 한 달; Dangsinui han dal)	5.1% (NR)	5.3% (19th)
4	1	May 11, 2021	Crossing the Line (선을 넘는다는 것; Seoneul neomneundaneun geot)	3.2% (NR)	N/A
4	2	May 11, 2021	Crossing the Line (선을 넘는다는 것; Seoneul neomneundaneun geot)	4.4% (NR)	5.2% (17th)
5	1	May 17, 2021	A Good Woman (괜찮은 여자; Gwaenchaneun yeoja)	3.8% (NR)	N/A
5	2	May 17, 2021	A Good Woman (괜찮은 여자; Gwaenchaneun yeoja)	4.6% (NR)	5.4% (16th)
6	1	May 18, 2021	A Cough, Love and.. (기침, 사랑 그리고; Gichim, sarang geurigo)	4.0% (NR)	N/A
6	2	May 18, 2021	A Cough, Love and.. (기침, 사랑 그리고; Gichim, sarang geurigo)	5.2% (17th)	4.8% (16th)
7	1	May 24, 2021	The Unbreakable Tie (끊어낼 수 없는; Kkeuneonael su eomneun)	4.2% (NR)	N/A
7	2	May 24, 2021	The Unbreakable Tie (끊어낼 수 없는; Kkeuneonael su eomneun)	5.0% (NR)	5.2% (19th)
8	1	May 25, 2021	After the Door Closes (그 문이 닫히고; Geu muni dachigo)	4.3% (NR)	N/A
8	2	May 25, 2021	After the Door Closes (그 문이 닫히고; Geu muni dachigo)	5.7% (12th)	5.6% (14th)
9	1	May 31, 2021	Warning Signs of a Disaster (재난의 전조; Jaenanui jeonjo)	4.0% (NR)	N/A
9	2	May 31, 2021	Warning Signs of a Disaster (재난의 전조; Jaenanui jeonjo)	4.9% (NR)	4.9% (20th)
10	1	June 1, 2021	Goodness, Hypocrisy, Utmost Effort (선, 위선, 최선; Seon, wiseon, choeseon)	4.4% (NR)	N/A
10	2	June 1, 2021	Goodness, Hypocrisy, Utmost Effort (선, 위선, 최선; Seon, wiseon, choeseon)	5.6% (13th)	5.0% (18th)
11	1	June 7, 2021	Mudeung Stadium (무등경기장; Mudeunggyeonggijang)	4.5% (NR)	N/A
11	2	June 7, 2021	Mudeung Stadium (무등경기장; Mudeunggyeonggijang)	5.3% (18th)	5.0% (20th)
12	1	June 8, 2021	The First of May (첫 번째 오월; Cheot beonjjae owol)	4.6% (NR)	N/A
12	2	June 8, 2021	The First of May (첫 번째 오월; Cheot beonjjae owol)	5.6% (11th)	6.1% (11th)
Average				4.3%	5.2%
In the table above, the blue numbers represent the lowest ratings and the red numbers represent the highest ratings.; NR denotes that the series did not rank in the top 20 daily programs on that date.; N/A denotes that the rating is not known.

== Awards and nominations ==
Name of the award ceremony, year presented, category, nominee of the award, and the result of the nomination
Award ceremony	Year	Category	Nominee	Result	Ref.
Blue Dragon Series Awards	2022	Best Supporting Actress	Keum Sae-rok	Nominated	
Blue Dragon Series Awards	2022	Best New Actor	Lee Do-hyun	Nominated	
KBS Drama Awards	2021	Top Excellence Award, Actor	Lee Do-hyun	Won	
KBS Drama Awards	2021	Top Excellence Award, Actress	Go Min-si	Nominated	
KBS Drama Awards	2021	Excellence Award, Actor in a Miniseries	Lee Do-hyun	Nominated	
KBS Drama Awards	2021	Excellence Award, Actress in a Miniseries	Go Min-si	Won	
KBS Drama Awards	2021	Best Supporting Actor	Lee Sang-yi	Nominated	
KBS Drama Awards	2021	Best Supporting Actress	Keum Sae-rok	Won	
KBS Drama Awards	2021	Best New Actress	Keum Sae-rok	Nominated	
KBS Drama Awards	2021	Best Young Actor	Jo Yi-hyun	Won	
KBS Drama Awards	2021	Best Couple Award	Lee Do-hyun and Go Min-si	Won	
Korean PD Awards	2022	Best TV Drama	Youth of May	Nominated	
Korean PD Awards	2022	Best Picture TV Drama	Youth of May	Won	
