= Jung Jae-kwang =

South Korean actor

- Born: November 29, 1990 (age 35); South Korea
- Other name: Jeong Jae-kwang
- Education: Chung-Ang University – Bachelor of Theater Studies
- Occupation: Actor
- Years active: 2016–present
- Agent: History DNC

Korean name
- Hangul: 정재광
- RR: Jeong Jaegwang
- MR: Chŏng Chaegwang

Jung Jae-kwang (Korean: 정재광; born November 29, 1990) is a South Korean actor. He is best known for his roles in dramas It's Okay to Not Be Okay, The Fiery Priest, Witch at Court and Nevertheless. He also appeared in movies Extreme Job, Pipeline and The Witness.

== Filmography ==
=== Film ===
Year	Title	Role	Ref.
2016	Scouting Report	Sung-joon's role	
2018	The Witness	Guy at the store	
2019	Extreme Job	Gungpyeong Port uniformed police	
2019	Vertigo	Seo Gwan-woo	
2021	My Big Mama's Crazy Ride	Yoo Ji-sang	
2021	Pipeline	Sang-goo	
2021	Not Out	Shin Gwang-ho	
2022	The Roundup	Kim Sang-hoon	
2023	Hopeless	Seung-mu	
2025	Nocturnal	Cha Myung-woo	
TBA	Night Trip		

=== Television series ===
Year	Title	Role	Notes	Ref.
2017	Save Me	Lee Eun-sung		
2017	Witch at Court	Prosecutor Yun		
2019	The Fiery Priest	Kim Geon-yong		
2020	It's Okay to Not Be Okay	Joo Jung-tae		
2021	Nevertheless	Ahn Kyung-jun		
2022	O'PENing – What are you do in the office, Share?	Jeong Jin-seok	one act-drama; season 5	
2022	Never Give Up	Min-jae		
2023	My Perfect Stranger	Yoon Yeon-woo		
2023	The Worst of Evil	Tae-ho		
2024	Connection	Kim Chang-soo		
2024	Queen Woo	Go Gye-su		
2024	Gangnam B-Side	MD Jung Kwon		
2025	The Trauma Code: Heroes on Call	Park Kyung-won		
2025	History of Scruffiness	Kwon Ki-hyuk		

== Awards and nominations ==
Name of the award ceremony, year presented, category, nominee of the award, and the result of the nomination
Award ceremony	Year	Category	Nominee / Work	Result	Ref.
Baeksang Arts Awards	2022	Best New Actor – Film	Not Out	Nominated	
Blue Dragon Film Awards	2021	Best New Actor	Not Out	Won	
Cine 21 Awards	2021	Best New Actor	Not Out	Won	
Jeonju International Film Festival	2021	Korean Competition Actor Award	Not Out	Won	
Seoul Independent Film Festival	2016	Independent Star Award – actor Category	Blood and Bones	Won	
Wildflower Film Awards	2022	Best Actor	Not Out	Nominated	
