= History of Scruffiness =

2025 South Korean television series

- Promotional poster
- Hangul: 찌질의 역사
- Lit.: History of Losers
- RR: Jjijirui yeoksa
- MR: Tchijirŭi yŏksa
- Genre: Romantic comedy
- Based on: History of losers by Kim Poong
- Written by: Kim Poong
- Directed by: Kim Sung-hoon
- Starring: Jo Byeong-kyu; Ryeoun; Jung Jae-kwang; Jung Yong-ju
- Country of origin: South Korea
- Original language: Korean
- No. of episodes: 8

Production
- Running time: 60 minutes
- Production company: HB Entertainment

Original release
- Network: Wavve
- Release: February 26 – March 19, 2025

History of Scruffiness (Korean: 찌질의 역사) is a 2025 South Korean romantic comedy television series written by Kim Poong, directed by Kim Sung hoon and starring Jo Byeong-kyu, Ryeoun, Jung Jae-kwang, and Jung Yong-ju. It is based on the Naver Webtoon of the same name written by Kim Poong and illustrated by Shim Yoon-soo. It premiered on Wavve on February 26, 2025, and aired every Wednesday at 11:00 (KST).

== Synopsis ==
It depicts the growth of four twenty-year-old boys through love and separation.

== Cast ==
=== Main ===
- Jo Byeong-kyu as Seo Min-ki
- Ryeoun as Noh Jun-seok
- Jung Jae-kwang as Kwon Ki-hyuk
- Jung Yong-ju as Lee kwang-jae

=== Supporting ===
- Song Ha-yoon as Yoon Seol-ha
- Bang Min-ah as Kwon Seol-ha
- Hwang Bo-reum-byeol as Choi Hee-sun
- Jo Yun-seo as So Ju-yeon
- Jung Shin-hye as Kim Chae-yeong
- Lee Min-ji as Oh Yeon-jeong
