= Shin Ye-eun =

South Korean actress (born 1998)

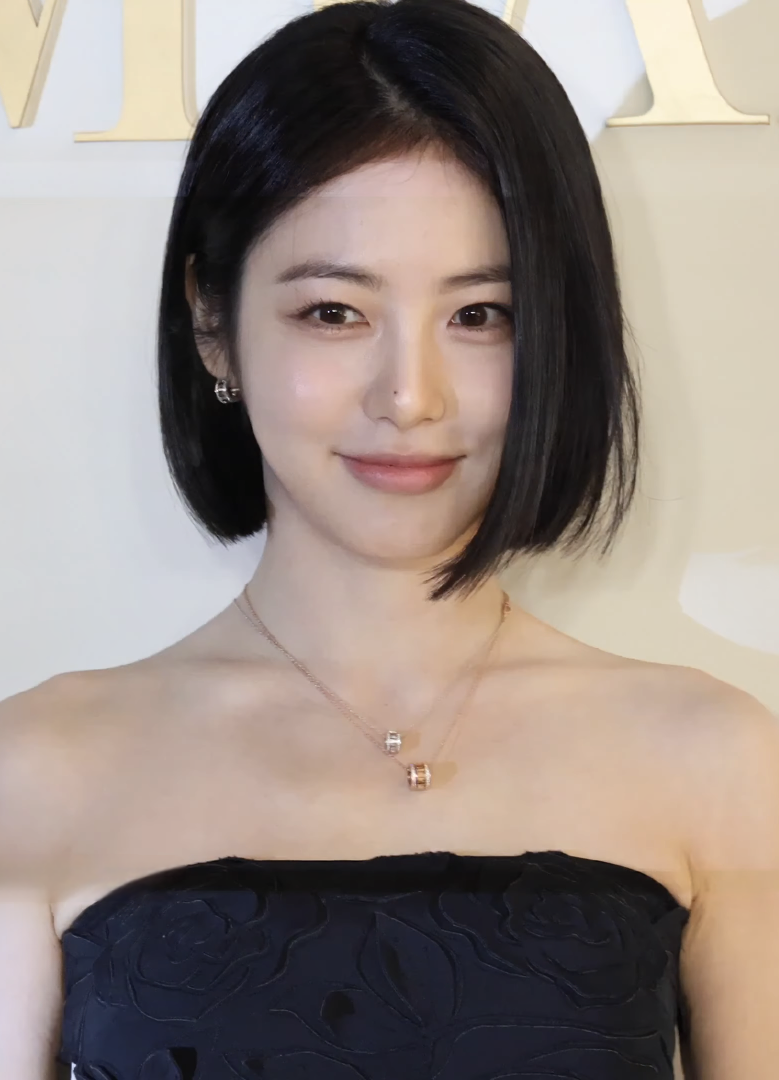
- Shin in January 2026
- Born: January 18, 1998 (age 28); Anyang, Gyeonggi, South Korea
- Education: Sungkyunkwan University (Performing arts)
- Occupations: Actress; model
- Years active: 2018–present
- Agent: NPIO

Korean name
- Hangul: 신예은
- Hanja: 辛睿恩
- RR: Sin Yeeun
- MR: Sin Yeŭn

Shin Ye-eun (Korean: 신예은; born January 18, 1998) is a South Korean actress and model. She gained popularity for her role in the web series A-Teen (2018) and its sequel A-Teen 2 (2019), as her portrayal of Do Hana earned her the sobriquet "Nation's First Love". Shin received international recognition after starring in the Disney+ original Revenge of Others (2022), the Netflix series The Glory (2022–2023), and Jeongnyeon: The Star Is Born (2024).

== Early life and education ==
Shin Ye-eun was born on January 18, 1998, in Anyang, Gyeonggi, South Korea. Growing up, she was interested in the performing arts, since her grandfather was a theatrical actor, and she would often watch his performances. She went to Anyang Arts High School and majored in acting before transitioning to Sungkyunkwan University where she would major in performing arts.

== Career ==
=== 2019–2021: Beginnings and breakthrough ===
Shin appeared as the cover model for Korea's college magazine College Tomorrow No. 840 in 2018. She made her debut shortly after as an actress in the 2018 web series A-Teen. In August 2018, Shin signed with JYP Entertainment; in the same year, she subsequently appeared in labelmate Day6's "Shoot Me" music video.

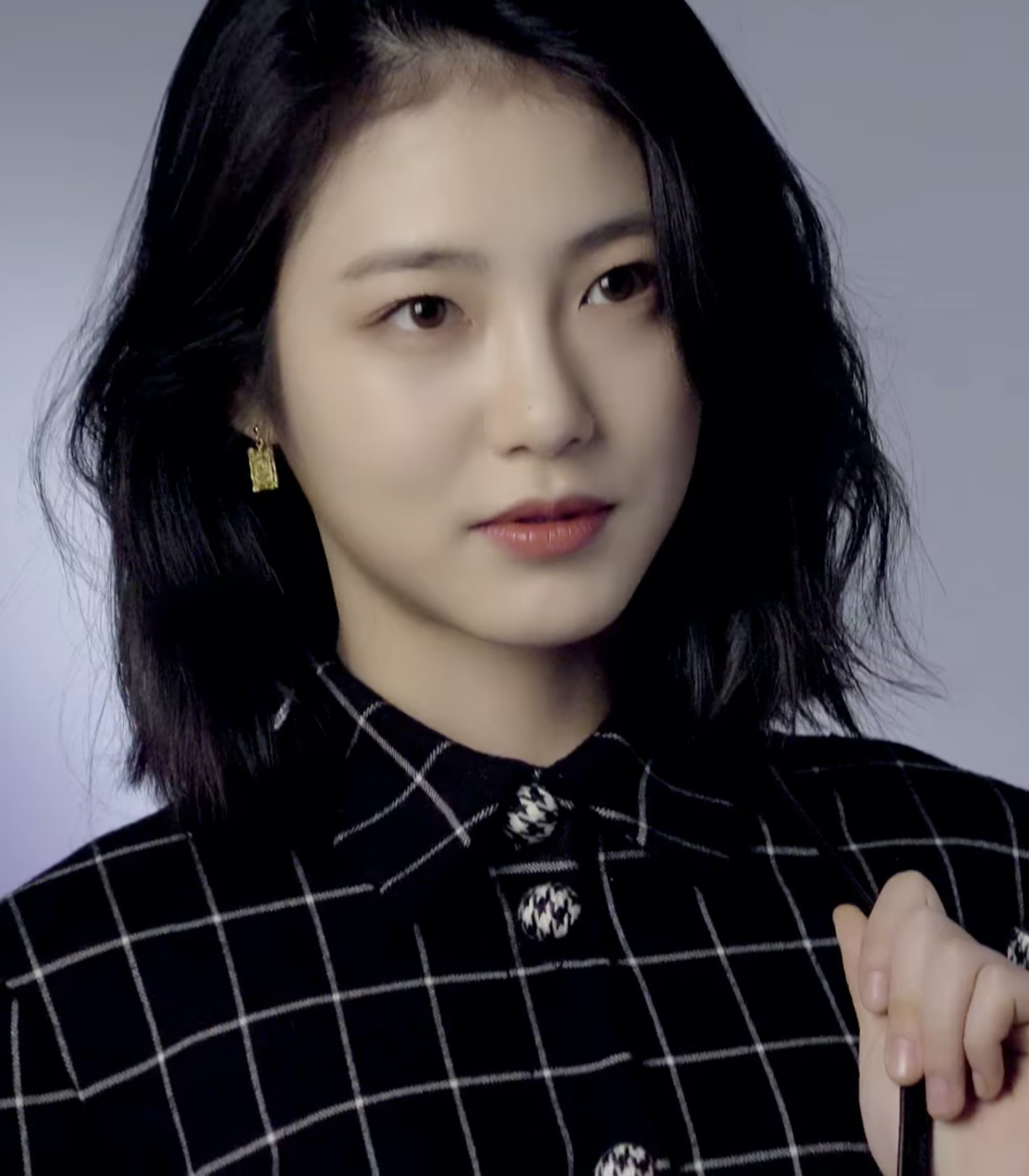
Shin in 2019

In 2019, Shin landed her first lead role in the fantasy television series He Is Psychometric, where she starred opposite Park Jin-young. She also reprised her role as Do Ha-na in the second season of A-Teen.

From July 2019 to July 2020, she hosted the music program Music Bank with Golden Child's Choi Bo-min. She was also selected as the ambassador for 21st Bucheon International Animation Festival in the same year.

In 2020, she starred in KBS2's Welcome alongside Kim Myung-soo. In 2021, she featured in the song "La Rosa" from U-Know Yunho's second mini album, Noir, which was released on January 18, 2021. Starting from November 2021, she joined the radio show Volume Up as a DJ after Kang Han-na's withdrawal.

=== 2022–present: Rising popularity and leading roles ===
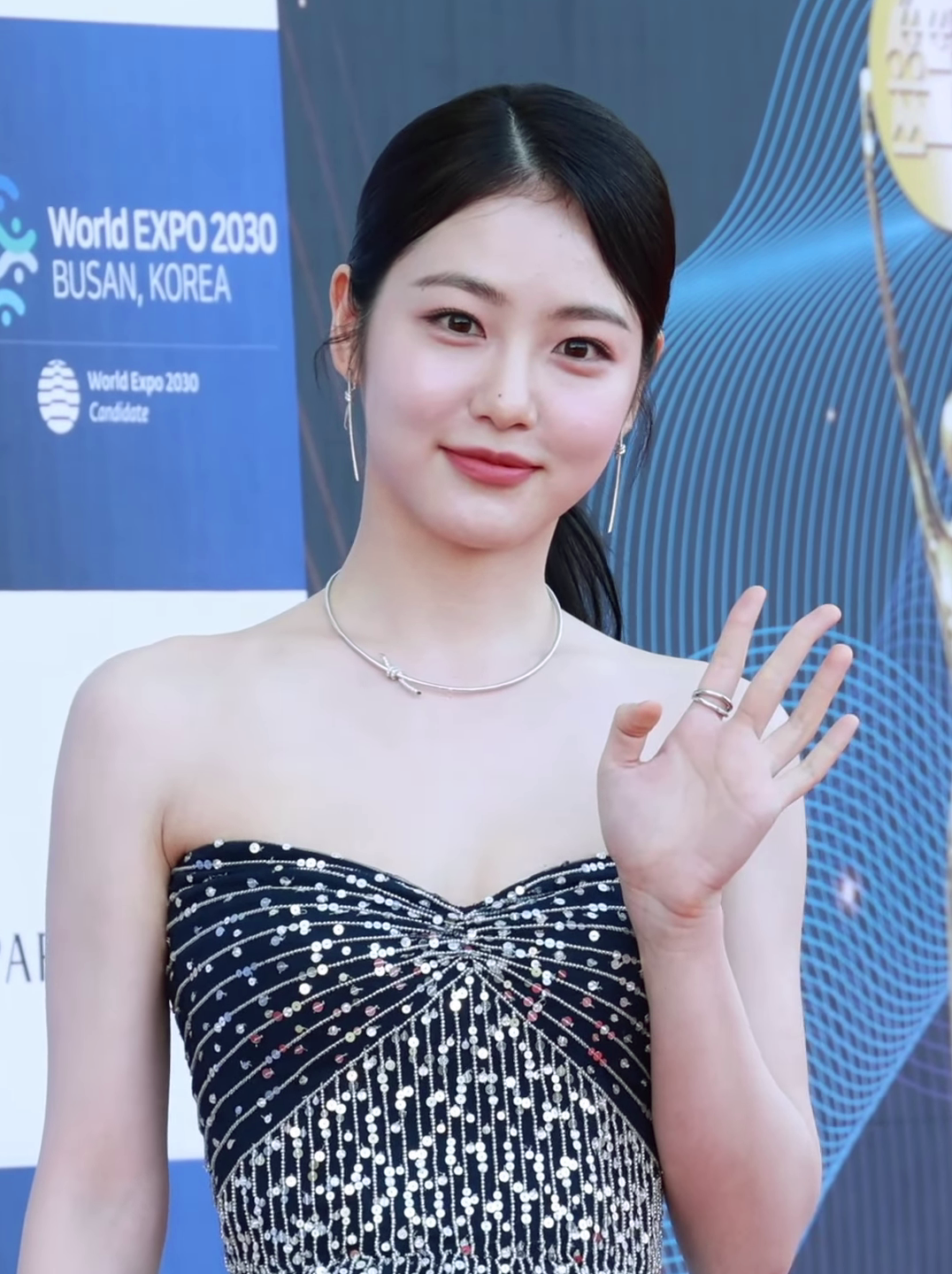
Shin at the 2nd Blue Dragon Series Awards in 2023

In 2022, Shin made a special appearance in the original TVING drama Yumi's Cells 2. Later in July, she joined the Bubble for Actors platform. Later in November 2022, Shin appeared in the drama Revenge of Others, which aired on the Disney+ platform. In the drama, she portrayed the main character Ok Chan-mi, a high school shooting athlete who investigates her twin brother's death and seeks revenge. For her performance in the Revenge of Others, she won Best New Actress – Television at the 2nd Blue Dragon Series Awards.

A month later in the same year, Shin was cast in The Glory as the younger version of Park Yeon-jin, the main antagonist of the story who persistently bullies the young Mun Dong-eun (portrayed by Jung Ji-so). With 380.38 million hours watched, The Glory ranked seventh among the all-time most popular non-English television series on Netflix.

In 2024, Shin was cast in tvN's historical musical drama, Jeongnyeon: The Star Is Born portraying the role of Heo Yeong-seo, a national theater actress and rival of the title character. For her performance as the character, Shin received favorable reviews for her outstanding emotional expression and captivating acting. In 2025, Shin was cast in the historical coming-of-age romance drama A Hundred Memories, which aired on JTBC from September 13, to October 19, 2025. On December 12, 2025, NPIO announced that Shin had renewed her contract with the agency.

In June 1 2026, Shin was cast in the medical rom-com drama Doctor on the Edge which aired on Genie TV and released on Disney+.

== Public image ==
Since her debut role as Do Hana in the 2018 web drama A-Teen, Shin has been called "Jun Ji-hyun of Teenagers" which landed her the monicker "Nation's First Love". Shin has also been praised for her versatility, transitioning between bright, youthful roles and dark, emotionally intense characters and as a performer who acts "as if writing poetry".

Shin has been referred to in Korean media as part of the "MZ Troika" alongside fellow actresses Go Youn-jung and Han So-hee. The title of actress troika has historically been used by Korean media to refer to the representative actresses of the generation, such as with Song Hye-kyo, Jun Ji-hyun, and Kim Tae-hee of the 2000s. In naming Shin, The Chosun Ilbo referred to Shin as a "rising star" who garnered attention due to her villainous turn in The Glory.

== Endorsements ==
In May 2019, Shin was selected to endorse Anna Sui's Fantasia perfume collection in a Vogue feature. In 2020, she was selected to endorse Innisfree's Wang Cherry Blossom Tone-Up Cream. In May 2021, H&M selected Shin to be their representative model for their fashion campaign. In March 2023, Shin was selected as brand ambassador for Charmzone Cosmetics. Three months later, she was selected to endorse Dongwon F&B's dairy brand Denmark and Ildong Foodis's Beaubit.

In January 2024, Shin was selected to endorse Le Coq Sportif's tennis collection. A month later, she was selected to endorse the South Korean brand J.Estina's spring collection handbag. Around May 2025, MICHAA chose Shin to sponsor her as their muse, endorsing the company’s brand for their third summer campaign. The following month, she became advertising model for the café chain Twosome Place. In May 2026, Shin was appointed regional ambassador for LG Electronics' Southeast Asian experiential marketing campaign, "Housewarming by LG".

== Discography ==
=== Singles ===
Title	Year	Album
As featured artist
"La Rosa" (불면) (U-Know featuring Shin Ye-eun)	2021	Noir
Soundtrack appearances
"Shooting Star" (별똥별)	2020	Welcome OST Part 12

== Filmography ==
=== Film ===
Year	Title	Role	Ref.
2025	Secret: Untold Melody	Park In-hee	

=== Television series ===
Year	Title	Role	Notes	Ref.
2018	A-Teen	Do Ha-na		
2019	A-Teen 2	Do Ha-na		
2019	He Is Psychometric	Yoon Jae-in		
2020	Welcome	Kim Sol-ah		
2020	More Than Friends	Kyung Woo-yeon		
2021	KBS Drama Special: "The Effect of One Night on Farewell"	Oh Jin	One-act drama	
2022	Rookie Cops	Jang So-yeon	Cameo; episode 1	
2022	Yumi's Cells	Yoo Da-eun	Season 2	
2022	Revenge of Others	Ok Chan-mi		
2022–2023	The Glory	Park Yeon-jin (young)	Part 1–2	
2023	The Secret Romantic Guesthouse	Yoon Dan-oh		
2024	Jeongnyeon: The Star Is Born	Heo Young-seo		
2025	A Hundred Memories	Seo Jong-hee		
2025	The Murky Stream	Choi Eun		
2026	Doctor on the Edge	Yook Ha-ri		
TBA	Night Traveler			

=== Television shows ===
Year	Title	Role	Notes	Ref.
2019–2020	Music Bank	Host	with Choi Bo-min (ep. 986–1037)	
2022	600 Years of Road Opened	Host	with Jinyoung	

=== Hosting ===
Year	Title	Notes	Ref.
2020	2020 KBS Song Festival	with Cha Eun-woo and Yunho	
2024	2024 Music Bank Global Festival in Japan	with Moon Sang-min and Hong Eun-chae	

=== Radio shows ===
Year	Title	Notes	Ref.
2021–2022	Shin Ye-eun's Volume Up	November 1, 2021– July 31, 2022	

=== Music video appearances ===
Year	Song title	Artist	Ref.
2018	"Shoot Me"	Day6	
2019	"Right"	Brown Eyed Soul (feat. Sole)	

== Accolades ==
=== Awards and nominations ===
Name of the award ceremony, year presented, category, nominee of the award, and the result of the nomination
Award ceremony	Year	Category	Nominee / Work	Result	Ref.
APAN Star Awards	2023	Excellence Acting Award, Actress	Revenge of Others; The Secret Romantic Guesthouse	Won	
APAN Star Awards	2025	Excellence Award, Actress in a Miniseries	The Murky Stream; A Hundred Memories	Won	
Asia Model Awards	2020	Rookie of the Year	Shin Ye-eun	Won	
Blue Dragon Series Awards	2023	Best New Actress	Revenge of Others	Won	
Brand of the Year Awards	2019	Rising Star	Shin Ye-eun	Won	
Brand of the Year Awards	2023	Rising Star Actress	Shin Ye-eun	Won	
Broadcast Advertising Festival	2023	Newcomer Award	Shin Ye-eun	Won	
KBS Drama Awards	2020	Best New Actress	Welcome	Won	
KBS Drama Awards	2021	Best Actress in Drama Special/TV Cinema	Drama Special – A Moment of Romance	Nominated	
KBS Entertainment Awards	2019	Best Couple Award	Shin Ye-eun (with Choi Bo-min); Music Bank	Won	
KBS Entertainment Awards	2019	Rookie Award	Music Bank	Nominated	
Korea Drama Awards	2019	Star of the Year Award	He Is Psychometric	Won	
SBS Drama Awards	2023	Excellence Award, Actress in a Miniseries Romance/Comedy Drama	The Secret Romantic Guesthouse	Won	
SBS Drama Awards	2023	Best Couple Award	Shin Ye-eun (with Ryeoun); The Secret Romantic Guesthouse	Nominated	

=== Listicles ===
Name of publisher, year listed, name of listicle, and placement
Publisher	Year	Listicle	Placement	Ref.
Cine21	2020	10 Stars and Rising Stars	Placed	
Cine21	2021	New Actress to watch out for in 2021	6th	
Cine21	2025	New Actress to watch out for in 2025	2nd	
