= Ryeoun =

South Korean actor (born 1998)

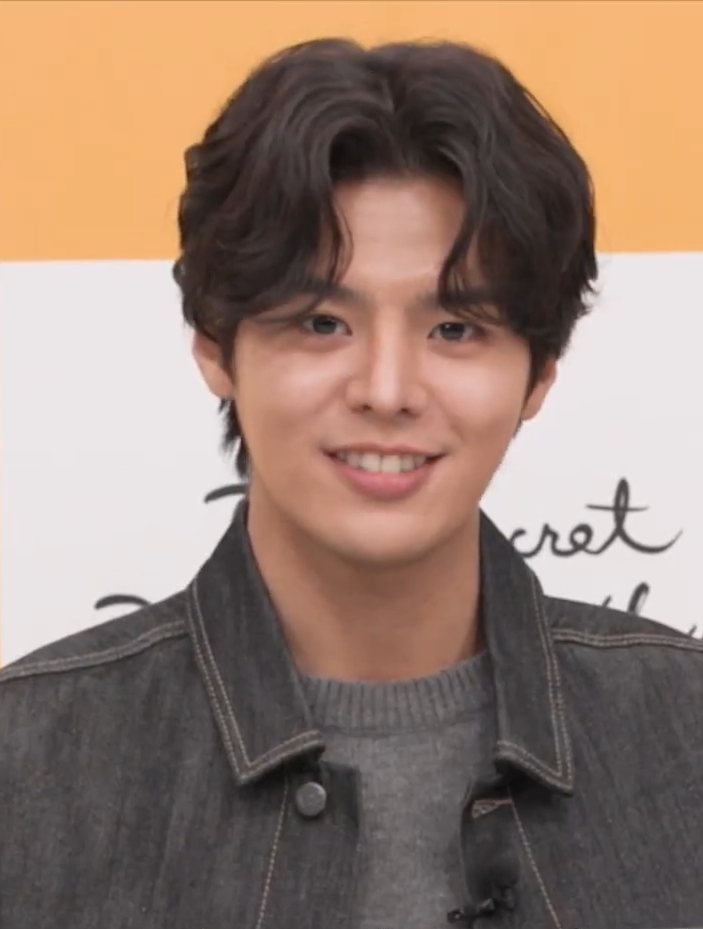
- Ryeoun in March 2023
- Born: Go Yoon-hwan; August 26, 1998 (age 28); Wansan District, Jeonju, South Korea
- Occupation: Actor
- Years active: 2017–present
- Agent: Lucky Company
- Height: 177 cm (5 ft 9 1/2 in)

Korean name
- Hangul: 고윤환
- Hanja: 高潤煥
- RR: Go Yunhwan
- MR: Ko Yunhwan

Stage name
- Hangul: 려운
- Hanja: 厲運
- RR: Ryeoun
- MR: Ryŏun

Go Yoon-hwan (Korean: 고윤환; born August 26, 1998), better known by his stage name Ryeoun (려운), is a South Korean actor. He is best known for his roles in 18 Again (2020), The World of My 17 (2020), Adult Trainee (2021), Twinkling Watermelon (2023), and Weak Hero Class 2 (2025). In 2023, he had his first and second television lead roles in The Secret Romantic Guesthouse and Twinkling Watermelon.

== Career ==
In 2026, Go starred in Disney+'s crime thriller television series Bloody Flower opposite Sung Dong-il and Keum Sae-rok. It is based on the novel of the same name by Lee Dong-geon.

== Filmography ==
=== Film ===
Year	Title	Role	Notes	Ref.
2026	Okay! Madam 2	Ji-hoon		
TBA	Tygo			

=== Television series ===
Key
†	Denotes television productions that have not yet been released

Year	Title	Role	Ref.
2017	You Are Too Much	Lee Kyung-soo	
2017	Temperature of Love	Youngest Cook	
2019	Doctor Prisoner	Han Bit	
2020	365: Repeat the Year	Nam Sun-woo	
2020	18 Again	Hong Shi-woo	
2020–2021	Homemade Love Story	Lee Ra-hoon	
2022	Through the Darkness	Jung Woo-ju	
2023	The Secret Romantic Guesthouse	Kang San	
2023	Twinkling Watermelon	Ha Eun-gyeol	
2024–2025	Namib	Yoo Jin-woo	
2026	Bloody Flower	Lee Woo-gyeom	
TBA	The World of Dating †		

=== Web series ===
Year	Title	Role	Ref.
2018	Doo–teob's Pretty Easy School Life	Kim Hak-jun	
2018	Instant Romance	Jang Su-ho	
2019	In-Seoul	Yoon Seong-hyun	
2020	The World of My 17	Yoo Jin-hyuk	
2020	In-Seoul 2	Yoon Seong-hyun	
2021	Adult Trainee	Kim Nam-ho	
2023	Borrowed Body	Yoon Ho-young	
2023–2024	Death's Game	youngest PD (Cameo)	
2025	History of Scruffiness	Noh Jun-seok	
2025	Weak Hero Class 2	Park Hu-min	

=== Television shows ===
Year	Title	Role	Ref.
2019	Creator Campus	Himself	

=== Music video appearances ===
Year	Song title	Artist	Ref.
2018	"But I Must" (헤어질 수 밖에)	Kim Na-young	
2021	"In Dreams" (너의 흔적)	M.C the Max	

== Awards and nominations ==
Name of the award ceremony, year presented, category, nominee of the award, and the result of the nomination
Award ceremony	Year	Category	Nominee / Work	Result	Ref.
KBS Drama Awards	2020	Best New Actor	Homemade Love Story	Nominated	
SBS Drama Awards	2022	Best New Actor	Through the Darkness	Won	
SBS Drama Awards	2022	Best Supporting Team	Through the Darkness	Nominated	
SBS Drama Awards	2023	Excellence Award, Actor in a Miniseries Romance/Comedy Drama	The Secret Romantic Guesthouse	Won	
SBS Drama Awards	2023	Best Couple Award	Ryeoun (with Shin Ye-eun); The Secret Romantic Guesthouse	Nominated	
Korea Drama Awards	2025	Best New Actor	Namib / History of Scruffiness / Weak Hero Class 2	Nominated	
