= The Secret Romantic Guesthouse =

2023 South Korean television series

- Promotional poster
- Hangul: 꽃선비 열애사
- Hanja: 花선비 熱愛史
- Lit.: Flower Scholars' Passionate Love Story
- RR: Kkotseonbi yeoraesa
- MR: Kkossŏnbi yŏraesa
- Genre: Period drama; Mystery; Romantic comedy
- Based on: Flower Scholars' Love Story by Kim Jeong-hwa
- Developed by: Studio S (planning); Copus (production investment); Viu (production investment)
- Written by: Kwon Eum-mi; Kim Ja-hyun
- Directed by: Kim Jung-min
- Starring: Shin Ye-eun; Ryeoun; Jung Gun-joo; Kang Hoon
- Music by: Lee Ji-yong
- Country of origin: South Korea
- Original language: Korean
- No. of episodes: 18

Production
- Executive producer: Lee Kwang-soon
- Producers: Lee Mi-ji; Kim Hee-yeol; Park Sang-hyun
- Production companies: Apollo Pictures; Pan Entertainment; Studio S
- Budget: ₩13 billion

Original release
- Network: SBS TV
- Release: March 20 – May 16, 2023

The Secret Romantic Guesthouse (Korean: 꽃선비 열애사) is a 2023 South Korean television series starring Shin Ye-eun, Ryeoun, Jung Gun-joo, and Kang Hoon. It premiered on SBS TV from March 20 to May 16, 2023 and aired every Monday and Tuesday at 22:00 (KST). It is also available for streaming on Wavve in South Korea, and on Viki and Viu in selected regions.

== Synopsis ==
The series is about an incident that takes place when the owners of a guesthouse called Ihwawon Inn, which breaks stereotypes, and boarders with secrets gather to find Lee Seol who disappeared 13 years ago.

== Cast ==
=== Main ===
- Shin Ye-eun as Yoon Dan-oh: the owner of a guesthouse called Garden of Flowers Inn. Her guesthouse is in trouble since it's not doing so well in attracting customers.
- Ryeoun as Kang San: a student preparing for a martial arts program with a cold atmosphere.
- Jung Gun-joo as Jung Yu-ha: a noble scholar who has a delicate personality that takes good care of the other person's feelings and fancies Dan-oh.
- Kang Hoon as Kim Shi-yeol: Another scholar staying at the Garden of Flowers. He's charasmatic, and, bubbly.

=== Supporting ===
==== People at Ihwawon Inn ====
- Lee Mi-do as Najubeak: Dan-oh's nanny.
- In Gyo-jin as Yook Ho: the oldest boarder in Ihwawon Inn.
- Jo Hye-joo as Yoon Hong-joo: Dan-oh's older sister.

==== People at Buyeonggak ====
- Han Chae-ah as Hwa-ryeong: a gisaeng who runs Buyeonggak, the largest guest house in Hanyang.
- Hwang Bo-reum-byeol as Ban-ya: A former noble woman who's been forced to work as a gisaeng to make ends meet.

==== People in the government ====
- Oh Man-seok as Jang Tae-hwa: a judge of Hanseongbu and an influential figure of Buyeonggak.
- Ahn Nae-sang as Shin Won-ho: the Left State Councilor.
- Hyun Woo as Lee Chang: king of Joseon.
- Kwon Do-hyung as Jang Hyeon: Jang Tae-hwa's son.
- Song Ji-hyeok as Choi Jong-soo: Jang Tae-hwa's right-hand man.
- Kim Hyun-sik as Kim Moo-hyung: Jang Tae-hwa's right-hand man.

==== People in the palace ====
- Gil Eun-hye as Gwiin Park: Lee Chang's concubine.
- Nam Gi-ae as Queen Dowager: Lee Chang's mother.
- Lee Joon-hyuk as Noh Seong-gil: the king's chief eunuch.
- Joo Suk-tae as Kim Hwan: the only person Lee Chang believes in.
- Choi Tae-hwan as Yoon Gu-nam: the king's royal guard.

=== Extended ===
- Lee Kwan-hoon as Park Jong-gwan: a military leader in the Naegeumwi.

=== Special appearances ===
- Han Eun-seong as Jung Gil-joon
- Park Hwi-soon as Ong Saeng-won

== Production ==
=== Development ===
On August 30, 2022, Pan Entertainment announced that it had signed a contract with SBS drama division—Studio S, to produce and supply The Secret Romantic Guesthouse worth 13 billion won. The drama will be produced in cooperation with Apollo Pictures.

=== Casting ===
On September 14, 2022, the main cast lineup was confirmed.

== Viewership ==
The Secret Romantic Guesthouse : South Korea viewers per episode (thousands)

Season	Episode number																	
Season	1	2	3	4	5	6	7	8	9	10	11	12	13	14	15	16	17	18
1	766	563	N/A	575	616	587	N/A	568	609	N/A	N/A	N/A	N/A	603	665	736	664	887

Source: Audience measurement performed nationwide by Nielsen Korea.

Average TV viewership ratings
Ep.	Original broadcast date	Average audience share		
Ep.	Original broadcast date	Nielsen Korea		TNmS
Ep.	Original broadcast date	Nationwide	Seoul	Nationwide
1	March 20, 2023	4.4% (15th)	4.8% (11th)	3.9% (20th)
2	March 21, 2023	3.8% (17th)	4.0% (16th)	3.3% (19th)
3	March 27, 2023	3.7% (22nd)	3.8% (17th)	N/A
4	March 28, 2023	3.7% (14th)	3.8% (13th)	3.2% (18th)
5	April 3, 2023	3.7% (16th)	4.1% (16th)	N/A
6	April 4, 2023	3.9% (14th)	4.4% (11th)	3.4% (20th)
7	April 10, 2023	3.7% (21st)	4.1% (17th)	N/A
8	April 11, 2023	3.8% (17th)	3.8% (15th)	N/A
9	April 17, 2023	3.7% (17th)	4.0% (11th)	N/A
10	April 18, 2023	3.7% (17th)	4.0% (11th)	N/A
11	April 24, 2023	3.2% (22nd)	3.3% (20th)	N/A
12	April 25, 2023	3.2% (19th)	3.3% (17th)	N/A
13	May 1, 2023	3.8% (18th)	4.1% (15th)	3.6% (17th)
14	May 2, 2023	4.1% (13th)	4.2% (9th)	3.6% (17th)
15	May 8, 2023	4.0% (13th)	4.3% (10th)	4.3% (16th)
16	May 9, 2023	4.5% (8th)	4.6% (7th)	5.2% (11th)
17	May 15, 2023	4.1% (12th)	4.3% (12th)	4.5% (14th)
18	May 16, 2023	5.0% (7th)	5.2% (5th)	5.8% (8th)
Average		3.9%	4.1%	4.1% (Note: This average rating is calculated based on the published ratings, the exact average ratings is unknown due to multiple ratings not published.)
In the table above, the blue numbers represent the lowest ratings and the red numbers represent the highest ratings.; N/A denotes ratings that were not published.

== Awards and nominations ==
Name of the award ceremony, year presented, category, nominee of the award, and the result of the nomination
Award ceremony	Year	Category	Nominee / Work	Result	Ref.
SBS Drama Awards	2023	Excellence Award, Actor in a Miniseries Romance/Comedy Drama	Ryeoun	Won	
SBS Drama Awards	2023	Excellence Award, Actress in a Miniseries Romance/Comedy Drama	Shin Ye-eun	Won	
SBS Drama Awards	2023	Best Couple Award	Shin Ye-eun and Ryeoun	Nominated	
SBS Drama Awards	2023	Best Supporting Actress in a Miniseries Romance/Comedy Drama	Han Chae-ah	Nominated	
SBS Drama Awards	2023	Best Supporting Actor in a Miniseries Romance/Comedy Drama	In Gyo-jin	Nominated	
SBS Drama Awards	2023	Excellence Award, Actress in a Miniseries Romance/Comedy Drama	Jo Hye-joo	Nominated	
SBS Drama Awards	2023	Excellence Award, Actress in a Miniseries Romance/Comedy Drama	Hwang Bo-reum-byeol	Nominated	
SBS Drama Awards	2023	Excellence Award, Actor in a Miniseries Romance/Comedy Drama	Kang Hoon	Nominated	
SBS Drama Awards	2023	Excellence Award, Actor in a Miniseries Romance/Comedy Drama	Jung Gun-joo	Nominated	
