= Nation's First Love =

South Korean informal title

Nation's First Love (Korean: 국민 첫사랑) or Nation's Boyfriend (Korean: 국민 남친) is an informal honorific title used in South Korean entertainment industry to describe a female [or male] celebrity, most often an actress, who embodies the image of a country's idealized first love.

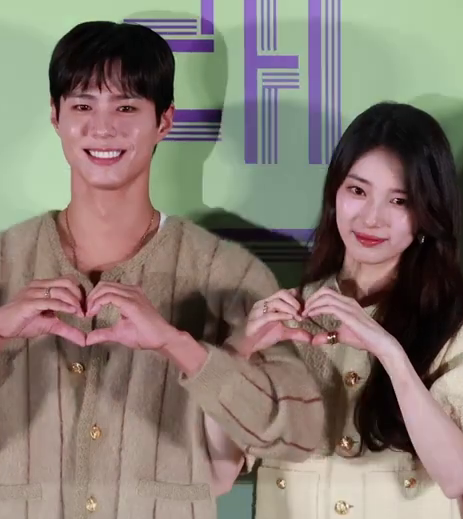
Actress and singer Bae Suzy (R) has been called "Nation's First Love" while actor Park Bo-gum (L) has been given the nickname "Nation's Boyfriend" by media outlets.

== People associated with the title ==
=== Nation's First Love ===
- Im Ye-jin (born 1960), actress
- Jo Yong-won (born 1966), actress and model
- Kang Susie (born 1967), singer
- Lee Mi-yeon (born 1971), actress
- Park Joo-mi (born 1972), actress
- Shim Eun-ha (born 1972), actress
- Myung Se-bin (born 1975), actress
- Jun Ji-hyun (born 1981), actress and model
- Son Ye-jin (born 1982), actress
- Lee Yeon-hee (born 1988), actress and model
- Bae Suzy (born 1994), actress, singer and model
- Shin Ye-eun (born 1998), actress and model
- Kim Da-hyun (born 1998), actress and singer
- Kim You-jung (born 1999), actress
- Roh Yoon-seo (born 2000), actress and model
- Kim Min-ji (born 2004), singer

=== Nation's Boyfriend ===
- Ahn Jae-wook (born 1971), actor and singer
- Cha Tae-hyun (born 1976), actor and singer
- Zo In-sung (born 1981), actor
- Hyun Bin (born 1982), actor
- Eric Nam (born 1988), singer
- Jung Hae-in (born 1988), actor
- Park Seo-joon (born 1988), actor
- Yoon Doo-joon (born 1989), singer and actor
- Byeon Woo-seok (born 1991), actor and model
- Park Bo-gum (born 1993), actor and singer
- Seo Kang-joon (born 1993), actor and former singer
- Nam Joo-hyuk (born 1994), actor and model
- Park Jin-young (born 1994), singer and actor
- Choi Hyun-wook (born 2002), actor

== See also ==
- Nation's Little Sister
