= Kim Kang-min (actor, born 1998) =

South Korean actor (born 1998)

- Born: December 2, 1998 (age 27); Sokcho, Gangwon Province, South Korea
- Occupation: Actor
- Years active: 2019–present
- Agent: Mystic Story

Korean name
- Hangul: 김강민
- Hanja: 金江珉
- RR: Gim Gangmin
- MR: Kim Kangmin

Kim Kang-min (Korean: 김강민; born December 2, 1998) is a South Korean actor. He made his debut with the television series Hot Stove League (2019–2020). He is known for his roles in the television series Hospital Playlist (2020–2021) and the web BL series To My Star (2021–2022).

== Filmography ==
=== Films ===
| Year | Title | Role | Notes | Ref. |
|---|---|---|---|---|
| 2021 | To My Star | Han Ji-woo | Web film | |

=== Television series ===
| Year | Title | Role | Notes | Ref. |
|---|---|---|---|---|
| 2019 | Drama Stage – My Uncle is Audrey Hepburn | Oh Joon-ho's classmate | One act-drama | |
| 2019–2020 | Hot Stove League | Lee Chang-kwon | | |
| 2020 | She Knows Everything | Bae Jin-woo | | |
| 2020 | Record of Youth | Aspiring model | Cameo (episode 2) | |
| 2020 | Tale of the Nine Tailed | Pyo Jae-hwan | | |
| 2020–2021 | Hospital Playlist | Im Chang-min | 2 seasons | |
| 2021 | Dark Hole | Min-kyu | | |
| 2021 | At a Distance, Spring Is Green | Gong Mi-joo's ex-boyfriend | Guest | |
| 2021 | Drama Special – F20 | Seo Do-hoon | (Note: Canceled due to controversy and complaints.) | |
| 2021–2022 | School 2021 | Ji Ho-sung | | |
| 2022 | O'PENing – XX+XY | Min Hwa-jin | Season 5; one act-drama | |
| 2022 | The Golden Spoon | Park Jang-goon | | |
| 2023 | Family: The Unbreakable Bond | Kwon Ji-hoon | | |
| 2023 | Drama Special – Joseon Chefs | Gye-am | Season 14 | |
| 2025 | Beyond the Bar | Ji Gook-hyeon | | |

=== Web series ===
| Year | Title | Role | Notes | Ref. |
|---|---|---|---|---|
| 2020 | Growing Season | Park Soo-ha | | |
| 2020 | Half-Fifty | Lee Geun-nam | | |
| 2021 | So Not Worth It | Kang Joon-young | | |
| 2021–2022 | To My Star | Han Ji-woo | Season 1–2 | |

=== Music video appearances ===
| Year | Song title | Artist | Ref. |
|---|---|---|---|
| 2022 | "The Story of Us" | Hynn | |

== Awards and nominations ==
Name of the award ceremony, year presented, category, nominee of the award, and the result of the nomination
| Award ceremony | Year | Category | Nominee / Work | Result | Ref. |
|---|---|---|---|---|---|
| KBS Drama Awards | 2021 | Best Supporting Actor | School 2021 and Drama Special – F20 | Nominated | |
