= Love.exe =

2025 South Korean television series

- Promotional poster
- Hangul: 제4차 사랑혁명
- Lit.: The 4th Love Revolution
- RR: Je4cha saranghyeongmyeong
- MR: Che4ch'a saranghyŏngmyŏng
- Genre: Romantic comedy
- Written by: Creative Group Songpyeon
- Directed by: Yoon Sung-ho; Han In-mi
- Starring: Kim Yo-han; Hwang Bo-reum-byeol
- Country of origin: South Korea
- Original language: Korean
- No. of episodes: 16

Production
- Production companies: Story Mob; Studio CR; INew Company; Binge Works; Pony Canyon (co-production and investment)

Original release
- Network: Wavve
- Release: November 13 – December 4, 2025

Love.exe (Korean: 제4차 사랑혁명; stylized as LOVE.exe) is a 2025 South Korean television series starring Kim Yo-han and Hwang Bo-reum-byeol. The series depicts Kang Min-hak, a famous model and influencer, and Joo Yeon-san, a brilliant computer engineering student who's clueless about romance, as they navigate love's ups and downs. It premiered on Wavve on November 13, 2025, and airs 4 episodes every Thursday, for a total of 16 episodes, at 11:00 (KST). It is available for streaming on Amazon Prime Video in Japan and Viu' in selected regions.

== Cast and characters ==
=== Main ===
- Kim Yo-han as Kang Min-hak
- Hwang Bo-reum-byeol as Ju Yeon-san

=== Supporting ===
- Kwon Young-eun as Yang Na-rae
- Minseo as Kang Dong-won
- Heo Jeong-do as Kim Mo-hyan
- Im Sung-kyun as Ban Ji-no
- Kang Shin as Im Yu-ri
- Lee Jun-hyuk as Peng Gil-tan
- Woo Ji-hyun as Kang Jae-hak
- Lee Ji-hye as Uhm Nan-sae

== Production and release ==
Love.exe is co-directed by Yoon Sung-ho and Han In-mi, written by Creative Group Songpyeon (Song Hyun-joo and Kim Hong-ki), and produced by Story Mob, Studio CR, INew Company and Binge Works, with co-production and investment from Pony Canyon.

In December 2024, Kim Yo-han was reportedly cast to play Kang Min-hak.

On March 6, 2025, Kim Yo-han and Hwang Bo-reum-byeol were officially confirmed to star as announced by the production team. On September 11, the script reading was revealed, and it was announced that the series is scheduled to premiere on Wavve in the second half of the year. On October 24, the series was confirmed to premiere on Wavve on November 13, at 11:00 (KST).
