= The Fiery Priest =

2019 South Korean television series

- Promotional poster for season 2
- Hangul: 열혈사제
- Hanja: 熱血司祭
- Lit.: Hot Blooded Priest
- RR: Yeolhyeolsaje
- MR: Yŏrhyŏlsaje
- Genre: Comedy; Crime action
- Written by: Park Jae-beom
- Directed by: Lee Myung-woo; Park Bo-ram
- Creative director: Kim Seon-woong (Martial arts)
- Starring: Kim Nam-gil; Kim Sung-kyun; Lee Hanee; Ko Jun; Keum Sae-rok; Sung Joon; Seo Hyun-woo; Kim Hyeong-seo
- Music by: Gaemi
- Country of origin: South Korea
- Original language: Korean
- No. of seasons: 2
- No. of episodes: 32

Production
- Producers: Ahn Jae-hyun; Shin Sang-yoon
- Camera setup: Single-camera
- Running time: 35 minutes (Note: In order to circumvent Korean laws that prevent commercial breaks in the middle of an episode, what would previously have been aired as single 70 minute episodes are now being repackaged as two 35 minute episodes, with two episodes being shown each night with a commercial break between the two.)
- Production companies: Samhwa Networks (season 1); Studio S; Big Ocean ENM (season 2); Red Nine Pictures (season 2); Gilstory ENT (season 2)
- Budget: ₩9.3 billion (season 1)

Original release
- Network: SBS TV
- Release: February 15, 2019 – December 27, 2024

The Fiery Priest (Korean: 열혈사제) is a 2019 South Korean television series starring Kim Nam-gil, Kim Sung-kyun, and Lee Hanee with Ko Jun and Keum Sae-rok in the first season, and Sung Joon, Seo Hyun-woo, and Kim Hyeong-seo in the second season. It was the first drama to air on SBS TV's Fridays and Saturdays timeslot. The first season was aired from February 15, to April 20, 2019, at 22:10 (KST), with a total of 20 episodes. The second season premiered on November 8, 2024, at 22:00 (KST).

The Fiery Priest is the highest rated miniseries drama that aired in 2019 on public broadcast according to Nielsen Korea. The drama was a huge success and was one of the most popular dramas aired in 2019. Kim Nam-gil won numerous accolades for his portrayal of a priest with anger management issues. The action comedy drama also featured parodies from other movies and dramas, notably from Mr. Sunshine, Nameless Gangster: Rules of the Time, The Matrix, Reply 1988 and Along with the Gods: The Two Worlds.

== Synopsis ==
Following the mysterious death of an elderly Catholic priest, an NIS agent turned Catholic priest attempts to bring the culprits involved before law. The hilarious journey in taking down the gangsters and corrupt officials in the city is what follows. The journey is not so smooth when the corrupt prosecutor of the city refuses to cooperate.

== Cast ==
=== Main ===
- Kim Nam-gil as Father Michael/Kim Hae-il
  - Moon Woo-jin as young Hae-il

An ex-NIS agent who retired after an accident that happened during his last mission. He met Father Lee and eventually decided to take the path as a priest and hoped for his sins to be forgiven. He was very close to Father Lee and thus is crazy to punish those who killed him. On the contrary to a priest, he is a short-tempered person.

- Kim Sung-kyun as Goo Dae-young

A clumsy detective who is a pushover and always manipulated by his superintendent and seniors. Once a dedicated police officer, his life changed after the death of his former partner. He is Goo Jayoung's nephew.

- Ko Jun as Hwang Cheol-bum

A corrupt businessman who is the step-brother of Gudam's Head of Borough. He runs Daebum Trading and trade illegal things within. Once ranked as number two gangster in Yeosu, he often uses violence to achieve his goal. (Season 1)

- Lee Hanee as Angela/Park Kyung-sun

A fully corrupt prosecutor who covered up the crimes of Gudam's administrators including the police chief and head borough. She likes Hae-il for his good-looking face but constantly bickers with him.

- Keum Sae-rok as Seo Seung-ah

A rookie detective at Gudam Police Station who is dedicated in helping Hae-il to reveal the truth behind Fr. Lee's death. She secretly has a crush on Hae-il. (Season 1)

- Sung Joon as Jacob/Kim Hongsik

A ruthless drug kingpin who established his empire in Southeast Asia then came back to Busan. He has a crush on Park Kyung-sun. (Season 2)

- Seo Hyun-woo as Nam Duheon

A corrupt and mysterious prosecutor who helps in spreading drugs in S.Korea for his personal gains. (Season 2)

- Kim Hyeong-seo as Goo Jayeong

An honest and straightforward police detective who stands against corruption but is forced to step back by her corrupt colleagues. Dae-young's aunt. (Season 2)

=== Supporting ===
==== Local cartel ====
- Jeong Young-ju as Jung Dong-ja

Gudam's Head of Borough and Hwang Cheol-bum step-sister.

- Kim Hyung-mook as Kang Seok-tae

Chief prosecutor of Gudam and boss of Park Kyung-sun.

- Jung In-gi as Nam Suk-goo

Gudam Police Station's corrupt superintendent and leader of Rising Sun, a nightclub with connections to the cartel.

- Han Gi-jung as Park Won-moo

A corrupt assemblyman representing Gudam.

- Lee Moon-sik as Ki Yong-moon

A con-artist and the leader of a religious cult "Maegak".

- Kim Won-hae as Vladimir Gozhaev

Leader of the Russian gang.

==== People at the Cathedral and believers ====
- Jung Dong-hwan as Father Lee Young-joon

He is looked up as a father figure by Kim Hae-il and is a wise, soft-spoken man. His murder was touted as a suicide.

- Jeon Sung-woo as Father Han Sung-kyu

A gentle young priest at Gudam's Church. He trained to replace Fr. Lee's position after his death. His real name is Han Woo-ram, a famous child actor who starred in an old, popular drama prior to becoming a priest.

- Baek Ji-won as Sister Kim In-kyung

Head nun at Gudam's church who constantly worry about Hae-il boldness in finding the truth. She is revealed to be a former well-known gambler nicknamed Ten-Tailed Fox who blamed herself for her brother's death.

- Ahn Chang-hwan as Song Sac

A young man from Thailand who came to Gudam and work as a delivery boy to support his family. He was often bullied by Jang-ryeong for being a foreigner and best-friend with Oh Yo-han.

- Ko Kyu-pil as Oh Yo-han

A cheerful yet chubby part-timer who majored in astronomy but struggles to make a living. He did many part-time work and is best friend with Song Sac.

- Yoon Joo-hee as Bae Hee-jung

A psychiatrist.

==== People at the Police Station ====
- Shin Dam-soo as Lee Myung-soo
- Jeon Jeong-gwan as Heo Lig-gu
- Ji Chan as Na Dae-gil
- Kim Kwan-mo as Kim Kyung-ryul

==== Others ====
- Kim Min-jae as Lee Jung-gwon

Former NIS agent and Hae-il's team leader.

- Lee Je-yeon as Kim Hoon-suk
- Eum Moon-suk as Jang-ryong
- Kim Joon-ha as altar boy
- Lim Seung-min as altar boy
- Ok Ye-rin as Lim Ji-eun
- Young Ye-na as Hyun-joo
- Jo Ah-in as Eun-ji
- Choi Kwang-je as Anton
- Jung Jae-kwang as Kim Keon-yong
- Jeon Eun-mi as Wangmat Foods staff
- Heo Jae-ho as Gi Hong-chan

The CEO of Great Taste Foods and Yong-moon's cousin.

- Kang Un as Wangmat Foods manager
- Lee Gyu-ho as Choco

A large chef who works at "Great Taste Foods" and acts as the muscle. Despite his towering size, he is easily knocked out by Hae-il but reemerges as backup later on.

- Cha Chung-hwa as Ahn Dul-ja
- Yoo Kyung-ah as nursery nun
- Song Young-hak as former detective

=== Special appearances ===
- Lee Young-bum as Father Kang Matthew
- Lee Ki-young as Oh Jung-kook
- Hwang Bum-shik as Kyung-sun's father
- Jung Shi-ah as Maegakkyo believer
- Kim Jong-goo as Kim Jong-chul
- Yoo Seung-mok as Oh Kwang-du
- Jang Ye-won as news announcer
- Kwon Hyeok-soo as President of the Republic of Korea Moon Jae-in
- Kim Hong-fa as Lee Seok-yoon
- Byun Joo-eun as Kim Geom-sa
- Park Eun-kyung as announcer
- Kim Won-gi as prosecutor
- Bang Jun-ho as planning manager

== Production ==
The first script reading took place on October 26, 2018 at the SBS Ilsan Production Center in Tanhyun, South Korea. The first season series was produced by Samhwa Networks for approximately 9.3 billion won.

Promotional poster incorporating several notable characters from the first season.

The Fiery Priest was first scheduled to air as a Monday-Tuesday drama following My Strange Hero, but due to SBS deciding to cancel the weekend special drama time slot (Saturday nights at 21:05 KST) after Fates & Furies, it became the network's first Friday-Saturday night drama. Haechi was then chosen to follow My Strange Hero.

This series was Lee Myung-woo's last project for SBS, after 12 years of partnership. In October 2019, he moved to Taewon Entertainment.

The Fiery Priest 2, the sequel to the drama, was originally planned for a 2022 release but faced delays. In late 2023, lead actor Kim Nam-gil confirmed his return, and by January 2024, the series was officially announced as part of the SBS 2024 drama line-up. Filming reportedly began in February 2024. The series is a joint production between Studio S, Big Ocean ENM, Red Nine Pictures, and Gilstory ENT. The new season is directed by Park Bo-ram, who was the "Team B" director for the first season and is scheduled to premiere on November 8, 2024, at 10 PM.

== Original soundtrack ==
The Fiery Priest OST

Soundtrack album by Various artists
- Recorded: 2019
- Genre: Soundtrack
- Languages: Korean; English
- Labels: Vlending; SBS Contents Hub

=== Part 1 ===
Released on February 22, 2019
No.	Title	Lyrics	Music	Artist	Length
1.	"Our Neighbourhood HERO" (우리동네 HERO)	Hong In-ho; Kim Soo-jung	Go Jin-young; Lee Jin-ho	Norazo	3:11
2.	"Our Neighbourhood HERO" (Inst.)		Go Jin-young; Lee Jin-ho		3:11
Total length:					6:22

=== Part 2 ===
Released on March 8, 2019
No.	Title	Lyrics	Music	Artist	Length
1.	"Breeze"	HaNa	ZigZag Note	Punch (feat. Gree)	3:53
2.	"Breeze" (Inst.)		ZigZag Note		3:53
Total length:					7:46

=== Part 3 ===
Released on March 29, 2019
No.	Title	Lyrics	Music	Artist	Length
1.	"Fighter"	Ra.L; La.Q	Gaemi	Jung Dong-ha (feat. La.Q)	2:56
2.	"Fighter" (Inst.)		Gaemi		2:56
Total length:					5:52

=== Part 4 ===
Released on April 5, 2019
No.	Title	Lyrics	Music	Artist	Length
1.	"Paradise"	Chin Chilla; Lee Myung-woo	Park Yoon-seo; Gaemi	Chin Chilla (feat. Ga Eun)	2:52
2.	"Paradise" (Inst.)		Park Yoon-seo; Gaemi		2:52
Total length:					5:44

=== Part 5 ===
Released on April 12, 2019
No.	Title	Lyrics	Music	Artist	Length
1.	"Joy"	Andy Platts	Andy Platts	Andy Platts	3:54
2.	"Joy" (Inst.)		Andy Platts		3:54
Total length:					7:48

=== Part 6 ===
Released on April 19, 2019
No.	Title	Lyrics	Music	Artist	Length
1.	"Victory"	Ra.L	Gaemi; earattack	Kim Yeon-ji	2:54
2.	"Victory" (Inst.)		Gaemi; earattack		2:54
Total length:					5:48

== Viewership ==
The Fiery Priest : South Korea viewers per episode (millions)

Episodes	Episode number												
Episodes	1	2	3	4	5	6	7	8	9	10	11	12	13
Ep.1–13	1.852	2.354	1.649	2.170	2.296	2.776	2.397	2.921	2.522	3.194	2.557	3.193	2.571
Ep.14–26	2.990	2.508	3.304	2.687	3.260	2.707	3.610	2.688	3.127	2.805	3.467	2.838	3.414
Ep.27–39	2.984	3.512	2.797	3.639	3.344	3.766	3.017	3.863	3.578	4.076	3.146	4.001	3.693
Ep.40–52	4.325	2.212	2.001	1.984	2.210	2.255	2.289	2.085	2.296	1.968	1.875	2.182	2.053

Source: Audience measurement performed nationwide by Nielsen Media Research.

Average TV viewership ratings (season 1)
Ep.	Original broadcast date	Title	Average audience share		
Ep.	Original broadcast date	Title	Nielsen Korea		TNmS
Ep.	Original broadcast date	Title	Nationwide	Seoul	Nationwide
1	February 15, 2019	A Priest in Trouble	10.4% (9th)	11.6% (7th)	9.3%
2	February 15, 2019	Hae-il Moves to Gudam	13.8% (4th)	15.6% (3rd)	11.9%
3	February 16, 2019	Hae-il Meets Cheol-bum	8.6% (14th)	9.5% (12th)	7.4%
4	February 16, 2019	Father Lee's Death	11.2% (9th)	12.6% (9th)	9.1%
5	February 22, 2019	Hae-il Investigates the Death of Father Lee	12.8% (5th)	14.7% (3rd)	11.0%
6	February 22, 2019	The Case Gets Closed	16.2% (2nd)	18.5% (1st)	13.3%
7	February 23, 2019	The Church Gets Desolate	13.0% (4th)	14.8% (4th)	11.1%
8	February 23, 2019	A Cooperative Investigation	15.7% (3rd)	18.0% (3rd)	13.4%
9	March 1, 2019	Cooperative Investigation Begins	14.0% (4th)	15.9% (3rd)	11.9%
10	March 1, 2019	Hae-il Investigates On His Own	17.2% (2nd)	19.5% (1st)	14.3%
11	March 2, 2019	Hae-il And Seung-ah Find The Witnesses	13.1% (4th)	15.0% (4th)	10.4%
12	March 2, 2019	Dae-young's Old Partner	16.0% (3rd)	18.2% (3rd)	12.8%
13	March 8, 2019	Kyeong-seon Meets Dong-ja	15.3% (4th)	17.1% (3rd)	11.9%
14	March 8, 2019	The Corrupt Food Service Company	17.7% (2nd)	19.7% (1st)	14.2%
15	March 9, 2019	To Tame A Fighting Dog	12.5% (5th)	14.6% (4th)	10.8%
16	March 9, 2019	Raid Wangmat Foods	16.1% (3rd)	18.3% (3rd)	13.7%
17	March 15, 2019	Hae-il Reports The Bribery Case	15.4% (4th)	17.4% (3rd)	11.5%
18	March 15, 2019	Kyeong-seon Is Back	17.5% (2nd)	19.5% (2nd)	13.7%
19	March 16, 2019	A New Lead Comes Up	14.2% (4th)	15.7% (4th)	12.0%
20	March 16, 2019	A Covert Infiltration	18.1% (3rd)	20.3% (3rd)	14.3%
21	March 22, 2019	Escape from the Villa	14.6% (3rd)	16.5% (3rd)	12.3%
22	March 22, 2019	Save Him	17.2% (2nd)	19.0% (1st)	14.9%
23	March 23, 2019	Hae-il's Past Is Revealed	14.8% (4th)	16.7% (4th)	12.6%
24	March 23, 2019	Hae-il Saves Kyeong-seon	17.9% (3rd)	19.6% (3rd)	15.5%
25	March 29, 2019	Break-in to Kyeong-seon's House	15.3% (3rd)	17.4% (3rd)	11.9%
26	March 29, 2019	Kyeong-seon Cooperating with Hae-il	18.5% (2nd)	20.9% (1st)	14.6%
27	March 30, 2019	Hae-il and Kyeong-seon Devising a Scheme	15.6% (4th)	17.4% (4th)	14.0%
28	March 30, 2019	Kyeong-seon and Seung-ah Entering the Lair of Anton	18.2% (3rd)	19.8% (3rd)	16.1%
29	April 5, 2019	Scheme to Find out the Owner of Rising Moon	15.5% (3rd)	17.7% (3rd)	13.0%
30	April 5, 2019	The Secret of Sister Kim	19.8% (2nd)	22.2% (1st)	16.9%
31	April 6, 2019	Let Me Teach You A Lesson	17.7% (4th)	19.9% (4th)	15.7%
32	April 6, 2019	Father Kim, Go to Argentina	19.4% (3rd)	21.6% (2nd)	17.3%
33	April 12, 2019	Scheme to Sneak in the Safe	16.2% (3rd)	18.6% (3rd)	—N/a
34	April 12, 2019	The Safe and People Locked in There	20.3% (1st)	22.8% (1st)	—N/a
35	April 13, 2019	Cheol-bum Asks Hae-il For Cooperation	17.2% (4th)	18.9% (4th)	—N/a
36	April 13, 2019	Father Han Trying To Persuade Dong-ja	20.0% (3rd)	22.1% (2nd)	—N/a
37	April 19, 2019	Father Han Falling into a Critical Condition	16.7% (3rd)	18.4% (2nd)	14.6%
38	April 19, 2019	The Truth of Father Lee's Death	20.3% (1st)	22.2% (1st)	18.1%
39	April 20, 2019	Showdown	18.6% (4th)	21.1% (4th)	15.9%
40	April 20, 2019	Unexpected Visit	22.0% (3rd)	24.7% (1st)	18.5%
Average			16.1%	18.1%	— (Note: Due to some ratings not recorded, the exact average rating is unknown.)
In the table above, the blue numbers represent the lowest ratings and the red numbers represent the highest ratings.; N/A denotes that the rating is not known.

Average TV viewership ratings (season 2)
Ep.	Original broadcast date	Average audience share (Nielsen Korea)	
Ep.	Original broadcast date	Nationwide	Seoul
1	November 8, 2024	11.9% (1st)	12.4% (1st)
2	November 9, 2024	10.1% (2nd)	10.6% (2nd)
3	November 15, 2024	10.7% (2nd)	11.1% (1st)
4	November 16, 2024	11.2% (2nd)	11.6% (2nd)
5	November 22, 2024	12.7% (1st)	13.6% (1st)
6	November 23, 2024	12.8% (2nd)	12.6% (2nd)
7	November 29, 2024	11.6% (2nd)	12.0% (1st)
8	November 30, 2024	12.1% (2nd)	12.6% (2nd)
9	December 6, 2024	11.3% (1st)	11.6% (1st)
10	December 13, 2024	10.8% (1st)	10.8% (2nd)
11	December 20, 2024	11.9% (1st)	11.9% (1st)
12	December 27, 2024	10.9% (2nd)	10.5% (1st)
Average		11.5%	11.8%
In the table above, the blue numbers represent the lowest ratings and the red numbers represent the highest ratings.

== Awards and nominations ==
Year	Award	Category	Recipient	Result	Ref.
2019	55th Baeksang Arts Awards	Best Actor	Kim Nam-gil	Nominated	
2019	Busan International Film Festival	Best Actor	Kim Nam-gil	Won	
2019	Korean Broadcasters Association Awards	Best Actor	Kim Nam-gil	Won	
2019	14th Seoul International Drama Awards	Excellent Korean Drama	The Fiery Priest	Won	
2019	14th Seoul International Drama Awards	Best Actor	Kim Nam-gil	Won	
2019	12th Korea Drama Awards	Best Drama	The Fiery Priest	Nominated	
2019	12th Korea Drama Awards	Best Screenplay	Park Jae-bum	Nominated	
2019	12th Korea Drama Awards	Star of the Year Award	Go Jun	Won	
2019	12th Korea Drama Awards	Popular Character Award (Male)	Ahn Chang-hwan	Won	
2019	32nd Grimae Awards	Best Actor	Kim Nam-gil	Won	
2019	32nd Grimae Awards	Best Picture (Drama)	Yoon Dae-young, Park Jong-ki	Won	
2019	2019 SBS Drama Awards	Grand Prize (Daesang)	Kim Nam-gil	Won	
2019	2019 SBS Drama Awards	Top Excellence Award, Actor in a Mid-length Drama	Kim Nam-gil	Nominated	
2019	2019 SBS Drama Awards	Top Excellence Award, Actress in a Mid-length Drama	Lee Hanee	Won	
2019	2019 SBS Drama Awards	Excellence Award, Actor in a Mid-length Drama	Kim Sung-kyun	Won	
2019	2019 SBS Drama Awards	Best Supporting Team	The Fiery Priest	Won	
2019	2019 SBS Drama Awards	Best Supporting Actor	Go Jun	Won	
2019	2019 SBS Drama Awards	Wayve Award	The Fiery Priest	Won	
2019	2019 SBS Drama Awards	Producer's Award	Kim Nam-gil	Nominated	
2019	2019 SBS Drama Awards	Best New Actor	Eum Moon-suk	Won	
2019	2019 SBS Drama Awards	Best New Actress	Keum Sae-rok	Won	
2024	2024 SBS Drama Awards	Grand Prize (Daesang)	Kim Nam-gil	Nominated	
2024	2024 SBS Drama Awards	Top Excellence Award, Actor in a Seasonal Drama	Kim Nam-gil	Won	
2024	2024 SBS Drama Awards	Top Excellence Award, Actress in a Seasonal Drama	Lee Hanee	Won	
2024	2024 SBS Drama Awards	Excellence Award, Actor in a Seasonal Drama	Kim Sung-kyun	Won	
2024	2024 SBS Drama Awards	Excellence Award, Actor in a Seasonal Drama	Sung Joon	Won	
2024	2024 SBS Drama Awards	Excellence Award, Actress in a Seasonal Drama	Kim Hyeong-seo	Won	
2024	2024 SBS Drama Awards	Best Supporting Actor in a Miniseries Seasonal Drama	Seo Hyun-woo	Won	
2024	2024 SBS Drama Awards	Best New Actor	Seo Bum-june	Won	
2024	2024 SBS Drama Awards	Best Young Actor	Moon Woo-jin	Won	
2024	2024 SBS Drama Awards	Scene Stealer Award	Ko Kyu-pil	Won	
2024	2024 SBS Drama Awards	Scene Stealer Award	Ahn Chang-hwan	Won	
