= Bloody Flower =

2026 South Korean television series

- Promotional poster
- Hangul: 블러디 플라워
- RR: Beulleodi peullawo
- MR: Pŭllŏdi p'ŭllawŏ
- Genre: Crime thriller
- Based on: The Flower of Death by Lee Dong-geon
- Written by: Go Jun-seok
- Directed by: Han Yoon-sun
- Starring: Ryeoun; Sung Dong-il; Keum Sae-rok
- Music by: Lee Yi-sak; Seo Jeong-su
- Opening theme: "Bloody Flower Title" by Lee Yi-sak
- Country of origin: South Korea
- Original language: Korean
- No. of episodes: 8

Production
- Running time: 48–59 minutes
- Production companies: EO Content Group; Contents G; Nemo Contents; Studio Santa Claus Entertainment

Original release
- Network: Hulu (Disney+)
- Release: February 4 – February 25, 2026

Bloody Flower (Korean: 블러디 플라워) is a 2026 South Korean crime thriller television series starring Ryeoun, Sung Dong-il, and Keum Sae-rok. Based on the novel The Flower of Death by Lee Dong-geon, the series explores the moral conflict surrounding a killer who claims to hold a universal medical cure. It was released on Disney+ from February 4 to 25, 2026, in South Korea. Produced by EO Content Group, the series is distributed internationally through various streaming platforms, including Viu, Kocowa, OnDemandKorea, and U-Next, covering markets across Asia, the Americas, Europe, and Oceania.

== Synopsis ==
Lee Woo-gyeom is a serial killer who claims his murders are a necessary means to save other people’s lives. The series follows the legal and moral conflict involving Lee, Park Han-joon—a defense attorney who seeks to protect Lee for personal reasons—and Cha Yi-yeon, a prosecutor attempting to convict him. The narrative explores the tension between the characters as they investigate Lee’s assertion that he can provide medical "cures" without a scalpel, provided that a life is sacrificed in exchange for each treatment.

== Cast and characters ==
=== Main ===
- Ryeoun as Lee Woo-gyeom
- Sung Dong-il as Park Han-joon
- Keum Sae-rok as Cha Yi-yeon

=== Supporting ===
- Shin Seung-hwan as Jo Woo-Cheol
- Kwon Soo-hyun as Chae Jung-Su
- Park Ji-il as Baek Sang-Hwa
- Kwon Hyuk as An Jung-Kil

== Episodes ==
| No. | Title | Original release date |
|---|---|---|
| 1 | "The Killer's House"; Transliteration: "Sarinjaui jib" (Korean: 살인자의 집) | February 4, 2026 |
| 2 | "The Savior's Quagmire"; Transliteration: "Guwonjaui neup" (Korean: 구원자의 늪) | February 4, 2026 |
| 3 | "Shifting the Narrative"; Transliteration: "Simpanui kkot" (Korean: 심판의 꽃) | February 11, 2026 |
| 4 | "A Glimmer of Hope"; Transliteration: "Han beonui gihwoi" (Korean: 한 번의 기회) | February 11, 2026 |
| 5 | "The Deal with the Devil"; Transliteration: "Akilleseugeon" (Korean: 아킬레스건) | February 18, 2026 |
| 6 | "Uncovering the Truth"; Transliteration: "Geumkidwin jinsil" (Korean: 금기된 진실) | February 18, 2026 |
| 7 | "Fleeing for Survival"; Transliteration: "Mwoibiuseuui ddi" (Korean: 뫼비우스의 띠) | February 25, 2026 |
| 8 | "The Final Act of Revenge"; Transliteration: "Majimak seontaek" (Korean: 마지막 선택) | February 25, 2026 |

== Production and release ==
Developed under the working title The Flower of Death (Korean: 죽음의 꽃; RR: Jugeumui kkot), Based on the novel of the same name by Lee Dong-geon, it received the Grand Prize at the 2023 Broadcast Video Content Contest hosted by Korea Creative Content Agency (KOCCA), selected from 525 entries. On June 26, 2025, Ryeoun and Keum Sae-rok were announced as the lead actors, they would portray a serial killer who formerly attended medical school and a prosecutor, respectively. While Sung Dong-il was cast on August 6, 2025; his role would be a lawyer seeking medical treatment for his daughter from the killer. The series is a joint production between EO Contents Group and Contents G. Principal photography began in September 2025.

In January 2026, Disney+ confirmed the official title as Bloody Flower and its premiere date to be on February 4, 2026, releasing two episodes each week. Prior to the series release, EO Content Group finalized several international distribution agreements to expand the series' availability across multiple regions. In Asia and Africa, the series is distributed via Viu, covering Hong Kong, Singapore, Indonesia, Malaysia, the Philippines, Thailand, the Middle East, and South Africa. Streaming rights for Japan were secured by U-Next, while additional contracts were established for Taiwan, India, Vietnam, and Russia. In the Western hemisphere, the series is available through Kocowa, covering the Americas, Europe, and Oceania. Distribution in North and South America is further supported by OnDemandKorea, which also services the series in Thailand and the Philippines. As of late January 2026, the production company indicated that further negotiations for additional regional broadcasting rights were still in progress.
