= So Not Worth It =

2021 South Korean television series

- Promotional poster
- Hangul: 내일 지구가 망해버렸으면 좋겠어
- Lit.: I Hope the Earth Collapses Tomorrow
- RR: Naeil jiguga manghae beoryeosseumyeon jokesseo
- MR: Naeil chiguga manghae pŏryŏssŭmyŏn chok'essŏ
- Genre: Sitcom
- Created by: Netflix
- Written by: Seo Eun-jung; Baek Ji-hyun
- Directed by: Kwon Ik-joon; Kim Jung-sik
- Starring: Park Se-wan; Jung Hae-in; Choi Young-jae; Minnie; Han Hyun-min; Carson Allen; Joakim Sorensen; Terris Brown
- Country of origin: South Korea
- Original language: Korean
- No. of episodes: 12

Production
- Running time: 30–34 minutes
- Production company: Mystic Story

Original release
- Network: Netflix
- Release: June 18, 2021

So Not Worth It (Korean: 내일 지구가 망해버렸으면 좋겠어) is a 2021 South Korean television series starring Park Se-wan, Shin Hyun-seung, Choi Young-jae, Minnie, Carson Allen and Han Hyun-min. It is Netflix's first Korean sitcom, which was released on June 18, 2021.

== Synopsis ==
The series revolves around a group of students with different multicultural backgrounds residing at a college dormitory in Seoul.

== Cast ==
=== Main ===
- Park Se-wan as Se-wan, Korean advisor in charge of the dormitory management.
- Shin Hyun-seung as Jamie, a newcomer from the US.
- Choi Young-jae as Sam, the son of the president of an Australian tteokbokki global food chain.
- Minnie as Minnie, a Thai student who loves Korean dramas and good-looking guys.
- Han Hyun-min as Hyun-min, a Korean student who couldn't enter the dormitory and has to travel five hours to go to university.
- Carson Allen as Carson, a White American student who loves Korean food and is Se-wan's roommate.
- Joakim Sorensen as Hans, a Swedish graduate student who always sticks to his principles no matter what.
- Terris Brown as Terris, a Trinbagonian graduate student, tagged as a casanova.

=== Recurring ===
- Jung Yi-rang as dorm cleaning lady / North Korean announcer / Icheon auntie.
- Kim Ji-in as Joo-ri, Terris's girlfriend and housemate.
- Kim Kang-min as Kang Joon-young, a high school student.
- Lee Jae-joon as Il-seop, Carson's blind date and Terris's friend.
- Kim Jae-hwa as Aunt Mae, Se-wan's mother's debtor.
- Prae as Prae, a Thai student who was Minnie's classmate in high school.
- Miki as Miki, a student from Spain.

=== Guest ===
- Ha Dong-hoon as a restaurant customer where Jamie works (Ep. 1)
- Lee Ji-hoon as doctor (Ep. 1), a taxi driver (Ep. 11), a barber (Ep. 12)
- Kim Jung-min as a drug squad detective (Ep. 2)
- Hwang Woo-seul-hye as Do You Know the Way lead actress (Ep. 3)
- Yoon Seo-hyun as Do You Know the Way lead actor (Ep. 3)
- Julien Kang as Frenchman (Ep. 4)
- Im Won-hee as Hyun-min's mother's ex-boyfriend (Ep. 4)
- Han Soo-ah as Mi Suk (Eps. 5, 6)
- Jeong Jin-woon as Carson's boyfriend (Eps. 6, 7)
- Kang Ho-dong as speed quiz host (Ep. 6)
- Hwang Kwang-hee as online buyer (Ep. 6)
- Maeng Sueng-ji (Ep. 6)
- Yang Byung-yeol as Yoo Shi-jin (Ep. 6)
- Choi Yu-jin as Han Hyun-ah (Eps. 9, 11)
- Lee Soo-geun as fortuneteller (Ep. 9)
- Kim Hee-jung as Se-wan's mother (Ep. 10)
- Baek Joo-hee as Hyun-min's mother (Ep. 10)
- Yoon Jong-shin as karaoke employee (Ep. 11)
- Hwang Bo-reum-byeol as Ji Eun (Ep. 11)
- Lee Ji-won as Jun-yeong's tutor (Ep. 12)
- Lee Il-jun as Jun-yeong's tutor's younger brother (Ep. 12)
- Joo Yeon-woo as senior

== Production ==
The series is directed by Kim Jung-sik, who previously worked on several hit Korean sitcoms like High Kick! (2006–07), High Kick: Revenge of the Short Legged (2011–12) and Potato Star 2013QR3 (2013), and Kwon Ik-joon of Three Men, Three Girls and Nonstop (2000–06), which teamed up for the birth of a global K-sitcom. Screenwriters Seo Eun-jung and Baek Ji-hyun previously worked on the first three seasons of the hit sitcom Nonstop (2000–06).

An online live press conference for the series was held on June 16, 2021. Park Se-wan, Jung Hae-in, Choi Young-jae, Han Hyun-min, Joakim Sorensen, Carson Allen, Terris Brown, director Kwon Ik-joon, and director Kim Jung-sik attended the event. Minnie, who was unable to join the interview, talked about her character through a recorded video.

== Original soundtrack ==
| No. | Title | Lyrics | Music | Artist(s) | Length |
|---|---|---|---|---|---|
| 1. | "So Not Worth It" (내일 지구가 망해버렸으면 좋겠어) | Woo Ji-woon; Park Se-joon | Woo Ji-woon; Park Se-joon | Youngjae | 2:58 |
| 2. | "Human Being" | Yoon Jong-shin | Yoon Jong-shin | Yoon Jong-shin | 3:07 |
| 3. | "Starry Night" (별빛 내리는 밤) | Kim Young-sung; Han-joon; Park Se-joon | Kim Young-sung; Seo Jae-ha; Park Se-joon | Yoo-hee | 3:12 |
| 4. | "Don't Worry, You'll Be Fine" (서툴러도 괜찮아) | Han-joon; Park Se-joon | Seo Jae-ha; Kim Young-sung; Park Se-joon | Lim Dan-woo | 3:12 |
| 5. | "So Not Worth It (Inst.)" (내일 지구가 망해버렸으면 좋겠어 (Inst.)) | | Woo Ji-woon; Park Se-joon | | 2:58 |
| 6. | "Human Being (Inst.)" | | Yoon Jong-shin | | 3:07 |

== Reception ==
=== Audience viewership ===
So Not Worth It took second place in Thailand and top 10 in Saudi Arabia. The series led the revival of the Korean sitcom that has almost disappeared from Korea after 10 years through OTT service.

=== Critical response ===
Decider's Joel Keller compared the series to the NBC sequel Saved by the Bell: The College Years, stating that "It reminds us of Saved By The Bell: The College Years, except with everyone speaking Korean." Keller described the series "that could fit among Netflix's American multi-cams" as not suitable as a "family sitcom, due to language and themes," but "it's brightly-lit, the jokes go at a sitcom's pace, and there's even a laugh-track." After watching the series, and praising the Korean skills of all the non-Korean actors, the crew at Decider recommended viewers to stream the show.

Bryan Tan writing for Yahoo! News praised the chemistry between the actors, and the performance of all of the foreign cast members "speaking native and seamlessly fluent Korean." He wrote, "It's definitely unique in the sense that it features such a diverse cast from all over the world". Tan concluded the review, "while the plot seemed to meander off here and there, the sitcom gives off a vibrant and comfortable feel akin to the American sitcom Friends" and recommended, if viewers are "looking for good fun and easy laughs, So Not Worth It is very much worth a watch".

== Accolades ==
| Year | Award | Category | Recipient(s) | Result | Ref. |
|---|---|---|---|---|---|
| 2022 | Blue Dragon Series Awards | Best Picture Award (Drama) | So Not Worth It | Nominated | |
| 2022 | Blue Dragon Series Awards | Best New Actor Award | | | |
| 2022 | Blue Dragon Series Awards | Best New Actor Award | Shin Hyun-seung | Nominated | |
| 2022 | Blue Dragon Series Awards | Best New Actor Award | Choi Young-jae | Nominated | |
| 2022 | Blue Dragon Series Awards | Best New Actor Award | Han Hyun-min | Nominated | |
| 2022 | Blue Dragon Series Awards | Best New Actress Award | Park Se-wan | Nominated | |
| 2022 | Blue Dragon Series Awards | Best New Actress Award | Minnie | Nominated | |

== Future ==
In an interview, director Kwon Ik-joon mentioned that the production of a second season was dependent on the first season's popularity. He commented, "While chatting with Minnie in Thailand, I thought, 'I think it would be fun to go to a foreigner's house'. It would be fun to draw a story about going on a vacation to a country where a foreign friend lives."
