= School 2021 =

2021 South Korean television series

- Promotional poster
- Hangul: 학교 2021
- Hanja: 學校 2021
- RR: Hakgyo 2021
- MR: Hakkyo 2021
- Genre: Coming-of-age; Teen; Comedy; Romance
- Created by: Ki Min-soo; KBS Drama Division
- Written by: Jo Ah-ra; Dong Hee-sun
- Directed by: Kim Min-tae
- Starring: Kim Yo-han; Cho Yi-hyun; Choo Young-woo; Hwang Bo-reum-byeol
- Music by: Park Seung-jin (Music Manager)
- Country of origin: South Korea
- Original language: Korean
- No. of episodes: 16

Production
- Executive producer: Lee Jeong-mi (KBS Drama Management Team)
- Producers: Jeong Seung-woo; Lee Ji-yong; Kim Dong-rae
- Editor: Kim Byung-wook
- Camera setup: Single-camera
- Running time: 70 minutes
- Production companies: Kings Land; RaemongRaein

Original release
- Network: KBS2
- Release: November 24, 2021 – January 13, 2022

School 2021 (Korean: 학교 2021) is a 2021 South Korean television series directed by Kim Min-tae and starring Kim Yo-han, Cho Yi-hyun, Choo Young-woo and Hwang Bo-reum-byeol. It is the eighth installment of KBS2's School franchise. The series tells the story of 18 students who choose a path rather than an entrance examination. It depicts their growing period of dreams, friendship, and excitement as they struggle through the undefined boundaries. It premiered on KBS2 on November 24, 2021 and aired every Wednesday and Thursday at 21:30 (KST) until January 13, 2022.

== Synopsis ==
A group of high school students who have chosen vocational paths instead of preparing for university entrance exams help one another overcome obstacles, learning about life, love and friendship along the way.

== Cast and characters ==
=== Main ===
- Kim Yo-han as Gong Ki-joon, 18 years old
  - Moon Woo-jin as young Gong Ki-joon

He lost his dream of taekwondo after 11 years of training due to an injury. A member of a woodworking club.

- Cho Yi-hyun as Jin Ji-won
  - Park Ye-rin as young Jin Ji-won

A bright high school girl with a resolute dream to become a carpenter. She lives in the house which is under Ki-joon's house.

- Choo Young-woo as Jung Young-joo

Transfer student with a secret story. He appears quick-tempered but is warm-hearted. Young-joo has tangled relationship with Ki-joon due to past events. He and Seo-young made an agreement to pretend to be a couple but, later on, has a crush on Ji-won.

- Hwang Bo-reum-byeol as Kang Seo-young

A quiet student in school who is mistaken for conceit. She prepares for entrance examination on her own to enter in any of the top five universities in South Korea because she wants to get the scholarship and lighten the load of the orphanage's people. After making the couple agreement with Young-joo, she secretly falls in love with him.

- Jeon Seok-ho as Lee Kang-hoon

A 39-year-old teacher in the Department of Architecture, Kang-hoon is a character who values work-life balance more than students.

=== Supporting ===
==== Nulgigo Architecture Design Class 2-1 ====
- Kim Kang-min as Ji Ho-sung

Ho-sung is a student who acts serious about every dream that keeps changing. A passionate fan of Go Eun-bi, he strives to balance the friendship between her and Jin Ji-won.

- Seo Hee-sun as Go Eun-bi

A cold aspiring singer who maintains a love-hate relationship with Kang Seo-young.

- Yoon Yi-re as Lee Jae-hee, Lee Jae-hyuk's twin sister.
- Lee Sang-jun as Lee Jae-hyuk

Lee Jae-hee's twin brother, nephew of the school president Gu Mi-hee, is a boy who acts faithful to his wishes. He tries to make the most of his favorable conditions by getting involved with Kang Seo-young.

- Lee Ha-eun as Jung Min-seo

A calm architecture student with tender heart and intern at Nulji Science and Technology High School. She unintentionally caused an accident at work which made her contemplate taking her own life but not before writing a letter referencing Hanna Dains' poem.

- Kim Nu-rim as Jong-bok

A sophomore in the architecture department of Nulji Science and Technology High School. He gets along well with his classmates, including Gong Ki-joon.

- Kim Jin-gon as Hong Min-ki

A friendly second-year high school student in the architectural design department, Min-ki cares about others and believes what he hears.

- Park Ga-ryul as Jo Tae-ri, class president who is a bit harsh and speaks directly.
- Jung Ye-seo as Lee Hyo-joo

A sophomore architecture student at Nulji Science and Technology High School who is Jin Ji-won's close friend. She always worries about Ji-won and supports her in what she does.

- Kim Cha-yoon as Kim Myung-ah

A bold and straight-forward sophomore in the Department of Architecture.

- Cha Joo-wan as Choi Tae-kang, captain of the school's taekwondo club.

==== Teachers ====
- Kim Gyu-seon as Song Chae-rin

A 37-year-old teacher in the Department of Architecture who stands by her students and often clashes with Lee Kang-hoon.

- Lee Ji-ha as Gu Mi-hee

The two-faced president at 54 years old who values the employment rate more than the students' dream. She created a slight conflict with them.

- Kim Min-sang as Lee Han-soo

50-year-old head of the Education Department. Lee also values employment rate more than student's dream, so he is secretly in conflict with students.

- Park Geun-rok as Shin Chul-min

A 38-year-old teacher who likes to hang out with children.

- Shin Cheol-jin as Oh Jang-seok, 65-year-old school principal
- Go Eun-min as Kim Young-na, a 20-year-old teacher.
- Im Jae-geun as Yeo Sam-yeol, a 50-year-old teacher.

==== Families ====
===== Ki-joon's family =====
- Park In-hwan as Gong Young-soo

Ki-joon's 70-year-old grandfather. A former carpenter, Gong lives alone with his grandson due to family circumstances. They love each other very much.

===== Ji-won's family =====
- Kim Soo-jin as Jo Young-mi

Ji-won's 50-year-old mother who does not support her dream.

- Jo Seung-yeon as Jin Deok-gyu

Ji-won's 52-year-old father.

- Kim Ye-ji as Jin Jin-soo

Ji-won's 24-year-old older sister.

===== Jung Young-joo's family =====
- Bang Jae-ho as Cheol Joo-jeong

Young-joo's 24-year-old older brother.

- Jo Ryeon as Kim Seon-ja

Young-joo and Cheol-joo's 51-year-old mother.

== Production ==
=== Development ===
The series was originally planned to air in 2020 under the title School 2020, but its production and broadcast were postponed after a dispute arose over the departure of its original female lead. The project was later reworked and retitled School 2021. Shortly before its premiere, the production company SR Pictures filed for an injunction against the series' production companies, Kingsland and RaemongRaein, over a contract dispute; the production companies maintained that School 2021 was unrelated to their earlier agreement with SR Pictures.

=== Casting ===
In February 2020, Kim Yo-han was confirmed male lead. Ahn Seo-hyun was initially set as the female lead, but her casting fell through in March 2020 amid conflicting statements from her side and the production company. Later, Kim Sae-ron was offered the female lead role, but rejected.

In April 2021, Kim Young-dae and Cho Yi-hyun joined the cast. On June 21, casting of the four main characters was confirmed. On July 15, it was reported that Kim Young-dae has dropped out of the series. On July 23, it was officially announced that Kim Young-dae withdrew. On July 27, Choo Young-woo was offered the role of transfer student, which originally Kim Young-dae was playing. On July 28, it was reported that Choo Young-woo officially joined.

On August 5, it was announced by Kurznine Entertainment that Seo Hee-sun would debut as an idol trainee in the series. At the same time, Mystic Story announced that Kim Kang-min also joined the cast of School 2021. The next day, August 6, the cast line-up for teachers and families was announced. On October 13, script-reading site was revealed by releasing photos.

=== Filming ===
On November 13, 2021, after one of the cast members tested positive for COVID-19, the production and presentation of School 2021 were suspended.

=== Music ===
On September 24, it was reported that producers Yoon Il-sang, artist Yoon Min-soo of Vibe, and Mamamoo's RBW Entertainment were participating in the School 2021 album production together and working on the songs.

== Release ==
School 2021 was originally scheduled to premiere on November 17, 2021. However, it postponed to November 24 after Kim Yo-han tested positive for COVID-19.

A special broadcast titled 2021, Let's Go to School! to promote the series was aired on November 18.

== Original soundtrack ==
School 2021 OST

Soundtrack album by Various
- Released: 2021
- Genre: Soundtrack
- Languages: Korean; English
- Labels: Kakao Entertainment; Kingsland

=== Part 1 ===
Released on November 24, 2021
No.	Title	Lyrics	Music	Artist	Length
1.	"Dream On"	Park Seong-jin, Shim Hyun-bo, Jeon Seung-woo	Park Seong-jin, Jeon Seung-woo, Choi Min-chang	Na Go-eun (Purple Kiss)	3:36
2.	"Dream On" (Inst.)				3:36

=== Part 2 ===
Released on November 25, 2021
No.	Title	Lyrics	Music	Artist	Length
1.	"My Way" (Prod. Yoon Min-soo of Vibe)	Lineath Rajendran, Pek Jin Shen, Lim Jiakang, Dante Kim	Lineath Rajendran, Pek Jin Shen, Lim Jiakang	4men feat. David Yong	2:59
2.	"My Way" (Inst.)				2:59

=== Part 3 ===
Released on December 1, 2021
No.	Title	Lyrics	Music	Artist	Length
1.	"Way to You" (그런 맘)	Shim Hyun-bo	K.imazine	Rosanna	4:06
2.	"Way to You" (Inst.)				4:06

=== Part 4 ===
Released on December 2, 2021
No.	Title	Lyrics	Music	Artist	Length
1.	"Can't Help Loving You" (좋은걸 어떡해)	Shim Hyun-bo	Park Seong-jin, Jeon Seung-woo, Choi Min-chang	Mimi (Oh My Girl)	4:06
2.	"Can't Help Loving You" (Inst.)				4:06

=== Part 5 ===
Released on December 15, 2021
No.	Title	Lyrics	Music	Artist	Length
1.	"I Am Not Asking for Much" (내가 많은 걸 바라는 게 아니잖아)	Yoon Min-soo (Vibe), Joseph (4Men)	Yoon Min-soo (Vibe), Joseph (4Men)	Seo In-young	4:45
2.	"I Am Not Asking for Much" (Inst.)		Yoon Min-soo (Vibe), Joseph (4Men)		4:45

=== Part 6 ===
Released on December 16, 2021
No.	Title	Lyrics	Music	Artist	Length
1.	"Absently" (멍하니)	Shim Hyeon-bo	Park Seong-jin, Choi Min-chang	Swan (Purple Kiss)	4:10
2.	"Absently" (inst.)		Park Seong-jin, Choi Min-chang		4:10

=== Part 7 ===
Released on December 22, 2021
No.	Title	Lyrics	Music	Artist	Length
1.	"Winter Flower" (겨울꽃)	Playing Child (High Season), Lim Ki-beom (High Season)	Hwang Seong-jin (RBW), Playing Child (High Season), Lim Ki-beom (High Season)	Solar (Mamamoo)	3:52
2.	"Winter Flower" (Inst.)				3:52

=== Part 8 ===
Released on December 29, 2021
No.	Title	Lyrics	Music	Artist	Length
1.	"Finally You" (결국 너)	Jeong Jong-min, RDHD1, RDHD2, RDHD3	Jeong Jong-min, RDHD1, RDHD2, RDHD3	Lee Geon-woo (Just B), Bae-in (Just B)	4:25
2.	"Finally You" (Inst.)				4:25

== Ratings ==
Average TV viewership ratings (nationwide)
Ep.	Original broadcast date	Average audience share (Nielsen Korea)
1	November 24, 2021	2.8% (27th)
2	November 25, 2021	1.6% (39th)
3	December 1, 2021	2.0% (35th)
4	December 2, 2021	1.6% (36th)
5	December 8, 2021	1.6% (42nd)
6	December 9, 2021	1.7% (38th)
7	December 15, 2021	1.6% (43rd)
8	December 16, 2021	1.6% (36th)
9	December 22, 2021	1.5% (43rd)
10	December 23, 2021	1.3% (44th)
11	December 29, 2021	1.6% (42nd)
12	December 30, 2021	1.7% (41st)
13	January 5, 2022	1.8% (39th)
14	January 6, 2022	1.6% (47th)
15	January 12, 2022	2.0% (38th)
16	January 13, 2022	1.6% (47th)
Average		1.7%
In the table above, the blue numbers represent the lowest ratings and the red numbers represent the highest ratings.

== Awards and nominations ==
Name of the award ceremony, year presented, category, nominee of the award, and the result of the nomination
Year	Awards	Category	Nominee	Result	Ref.
2021	KBS Drama Awards	Best New Actor	Kim Yo-han	Won	
2021	KBS Drama Awards	Best New Actor	Choo Young-woo	Nominated	
2021	KBS Drama Awards	Best New Actress	Cho Yi-hyun	Nominated	
2021	KBS Drama Awards	Best New Actress	Hwang Bo-reum-byeol	Nominated	
2021	KBS Drama Awards	Best Supporting Actor	Kim Kang-min	Nominated	
2021	KBS Drama Awards	Best Couple Award	Kim Yo-han and Cho Yi-hyun	Won	
2022	APAN Star Awards	Best New Actress	Cho Yi-hyun	Nominated	
