= Keum Sae-rok =

South Korean actress (born 1992)

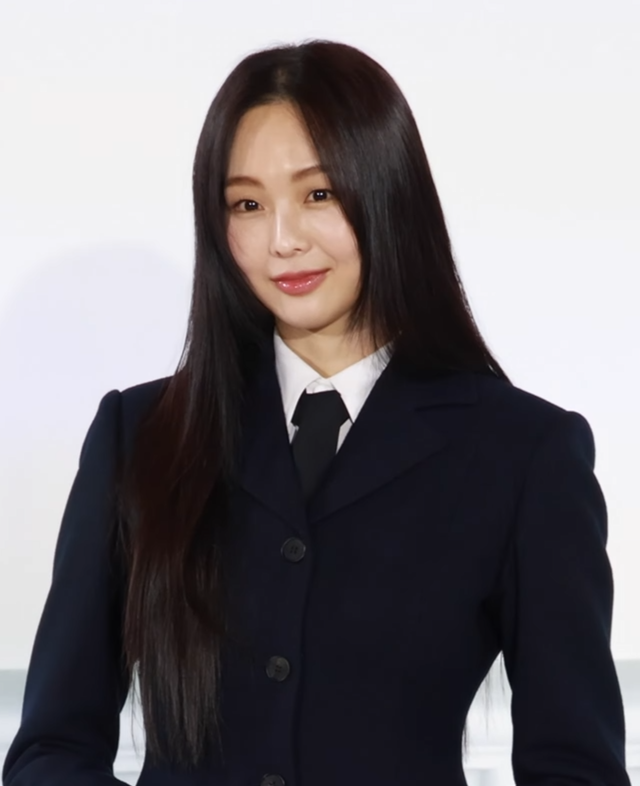
- Keum in December 2023
- Born: September 6, 1992 (age 33); Daegu, South Korea
- Education: Seoul Institute of the Arts (BFA in acting)
- Occupation: Actress
- Years active: 2011–present
- Agent: BH Entertainment

Korean name
- Hangul: 금새록
- RR: Geum Saerok
- MR: Kŭm Saerok
- Website: bhent.co.kr

Keum Sae-rok (Korean: 금새록; born September 6, 1992) is a South Korean actress. After appearing in a number of television commercials and short films, she had her first feature in mainstream films, The Silenced (2015), and gained wider recognition for her prominent role in the comedy-drama series The Fiery Priest (2019), which brought Keum the Best New Actress at the 2019 SBS Drama Awards. She subsequently starred in the Youth of May (2021), The Interest of Love (2022–2023), and Soundtrack #2 (2023).

== Early life and education ==
Keum Sae-rok was born on September 6, 1992 in Dong District, Daegu, South Korea. She graduated from the Seoul Institute of the Arts with a degree in acting.

== Career ==
=== 2011–2018: Early career beginnings ===
Keum's career began with her appearing in television commercials and short films before landing minor roles in mainstream films The Silenced (2015), Assassination (2015), and Love, Lies (2016). In 2017, she was cast in a supporting role in the hit thriller Believer (2018). In 2018, she first drew notice as one of the daughters in the family drama Marry Me Now (2018).

=== 2019–present: Rising popularity and transition to leading roles ===
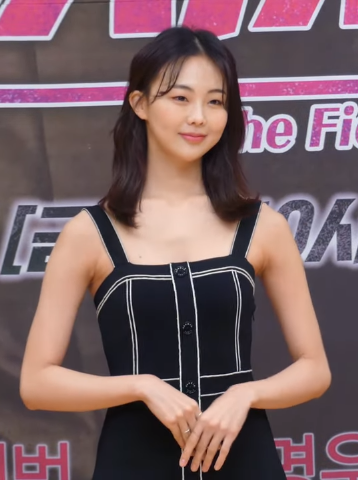
Keum at The Fiery Priest press conference in February 2019

Her subsequent performance as a tough rookie detective in the comedy television series The Fiery Priest (2019) brought her wider recognition and won her Best New Actress at the 2019 SBS Drama Awards. Later that year, Keum joined the film The King's Letters (2019).

In 2020, Keum joined tvN's Drama Stage Season 3: Everyone Is There.

In 2021, Keum joined the SBS drama Joseon Exorcist, but it only aired 2 episodes. It was canceled due to historical distortions, which caused Keum to write an apology letter. Keum later joined the KBS drama Youth of May, which was based on the Gwangju Uprising. Later, Keum joined the SBS variety program Baek Jong-won's Alley Restaurant. In July, Keum joined the cast of the film Open the Door.

On December 10, 2021, it was reported that Keum had terminated her contract with UL Entertainment and decided not to renew the contract after 5 years. On December 20, 2021, it was announced that Keum had signed a contract with History D&C.

In January 2024, Keum signed with new agency BH Entertainment.

In 2026, Go starred in Disney+'s crime thriller television series Bloody Flower opposite Sung Dong-il and Ryeoun. It is based on the novel of the same name by Lee Dong-geon.

== Filmography ==
=== Film ===
Year	Title	Role	Notes	Ref.
2015	The Silenced	Oyama Naoko		
2015	Assassination	Perfume salesman		
2016	Love, Lies	Adult gisaeng	Cameo	
2016	The Last Princess	Park Joo-ok		
2016	The Age of Shadows	Dining section bartender	Cameo	
2016	Han River	Nurse 3		
2017	The King	Jun Hee-sung's friend		
2018	Believer	Soo-jeong		
2018	The Spy Gone North	President's Bodyguards Female Officer 3		
2019	The King's Letters	Jin-ah		
2019	Our Body	Hee-jung		
2023	Don't Buy the Seller	Kim Hye-jin		
2024	Cabriolet	Jia		
2025	Seven O'Clock Breakfast Club for the Brokenhearted	Hyeon-jung		

=== Television series ===
Year	Title	Role	Notes	Ref.
2018	Marry Me Now	Park Hyun-ha		
2019	The Fiery Priest	Seo Seung-ah		
2019	Class of Lies	Ha So-hyeon		
2020	Drama Stage: "Everyone Is There"	Kang Il-young	Season 3 – one-act drama	
2021	Joseon Exorcist	Hyeum	2 episodes	
2021	Youth of May	Lee Soo-ryun		
2022–2023	The Interest of Love	Park Mi-kyung		
2024	Iron Family	Lee Da-rim		
2026	Bloody Flower	Cha Yi-yeon		

=== Web series ===
Year	Title	Role	Ref.
2016	Game Development Girls	Cosplay party 2	
2023	Soundtrack 2	Do Hyun-seo	
TBA	People of the Blue House	Second daughter	

=== Television shows ===
Year	Title	Role	Notes	Ref.
2021	Baek Jong-won's Alley Restaurant	Co-host	Episodes 169–200	
2025–2026	Iron Girls	Cast member	Season 2–3	

== Accolades ==
=== Awards and nominations ===
Name of the award ceremony, year presented, category, nominee of the award, and the result of the nomination
Award ceremony	Year	Category	Nominee / Work	Result	Ref.
Blue Dragon Series Awards	2022	Best Supporting Actress	Youth of May	Nominated	
Brand of the Year Awards	2021	Rising Star Actress	Keum Sae-rok	Nominated	
KBS Drama Awards	2018	Best New Actress	Marry Me Now	Nominated	
KBS Drama Awards	2021	Best New Actress	Youth of May	Nominated	
KBS Drama Awards	2021	Best Supporting Actress	Youth of May	Won	
KBS Drama Awards	2024	Excellence Award, Actress in a Serial Drama	Iron Family	Won	
KBS Drama Awards	2024	Popularity Award, Actress	Iron Family	Won	
KBS Drama Awards	2024	Best Couple Award (with Kim Jung-hyun)	Iron Family	Won	
SBS Drama Awards	2019	Best New Actress	The Fiery Priest	Won	
SBS Entertainment Awards	2021	Rookie Award in Variety	Baek Jong-won's Alley Restaurant	Won	

=== Listicles ===
Name of publisher, year listed, name of listicle, and placement
Publisher	Year	Listicle	Placement	Ref.
Cine21	2021	New Actress to watch out for in 2022	6th (Note: Tied with Go Min-si, Park Eun-bin, Moon Ga-young, Joo Hyun-young, Park Gyu-young, Lee Soo-kyung, Roh Yoon-seo, Gong Seung-yeon, Lee Se-young, IU, Shin Hyun-been, Park Ji-hu, Han So-hee, Jung Ji-so, Bang Min-ah, Jeon Jong-seo, Roh Jeong-eui)	
