= List of Hanlim Arts School alumni =

Arts high school located in Seoul, South Korea

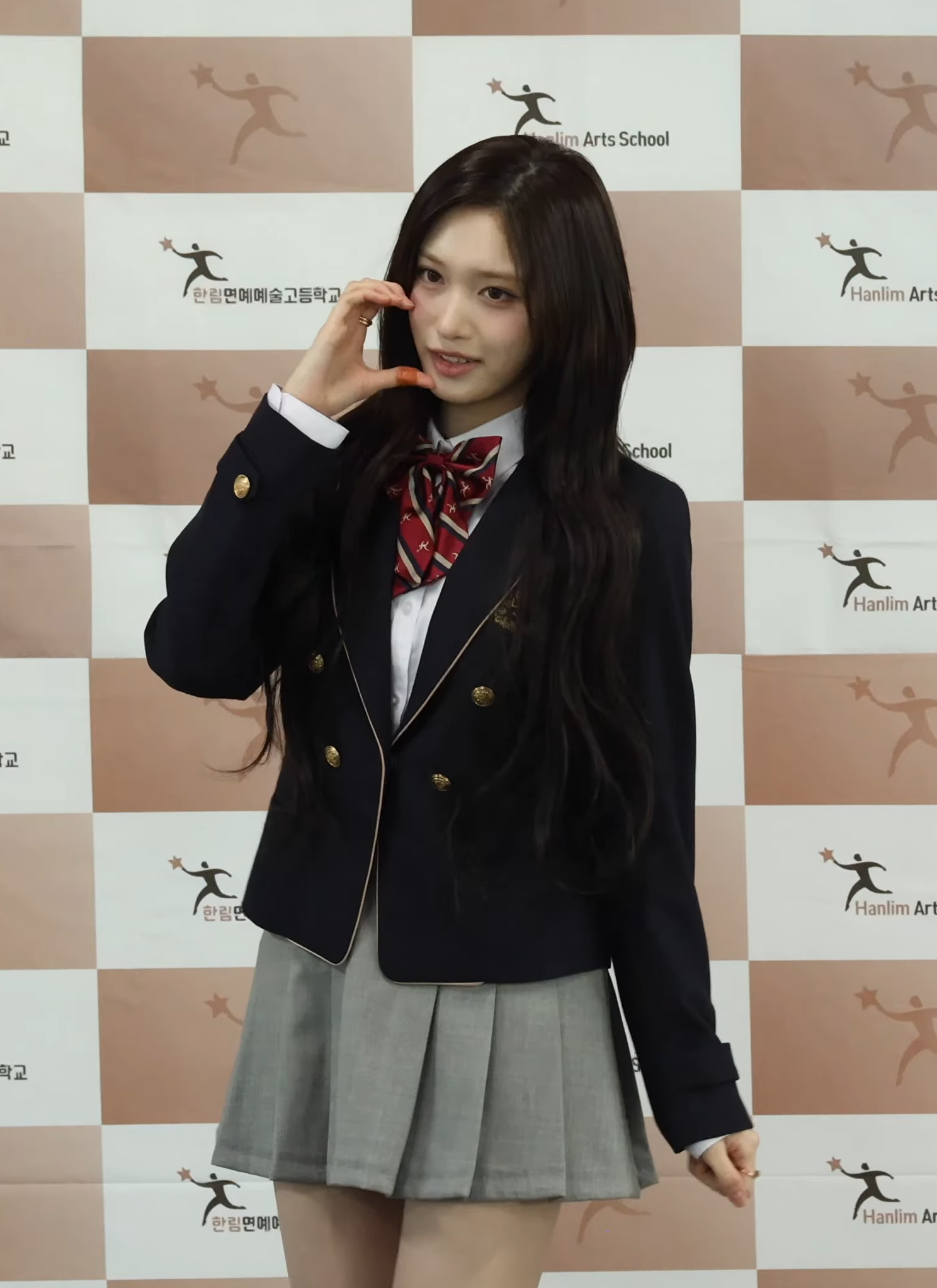
The school uniform of Hanlim Arts School. The photo features Leeseo, graduated in 2026

Hanlim Arts School (Korean: 한림연예예술고등학교) is an arts high school located in Seoul, South Korea. It was established in 2009, when the principal had an idea of training future members of South Korea's entertainment industry. The school has six departments, and its first cohort of students graduated in 2012.

Hanlim School is known as a training school for Korean idols. Many alumni have become famous idols in Korea, such as Cha Eun-woo and Yoon San-ha of Astro, as well as Dahyun, Chaeyoung and Tzuyu of Twice.

This list includes notable alumni of Hanlim Arts School, including their names in English and Korean, graduation year, and department. It is sorted by each alumnus graduation year.

== Department ==
Departments of Hanlim Arts School
English name	Korean name	Established year	First cohort of students Graduated in
Acting Department	연예과	2009	2012
Musical Theatre Department	뮤지컬과	2009	2012
Dance Department	실용무용과	2009	2012
Music Department	실용음악과	2010	2013
Fashion Model Department	패션모델과	2010	2013
Film Making Department	영상제작과	2010	2013

== List ==
=== Acting Department ===
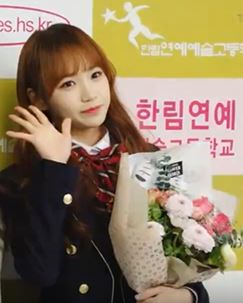
Kim Chaewon, graduated in 2019

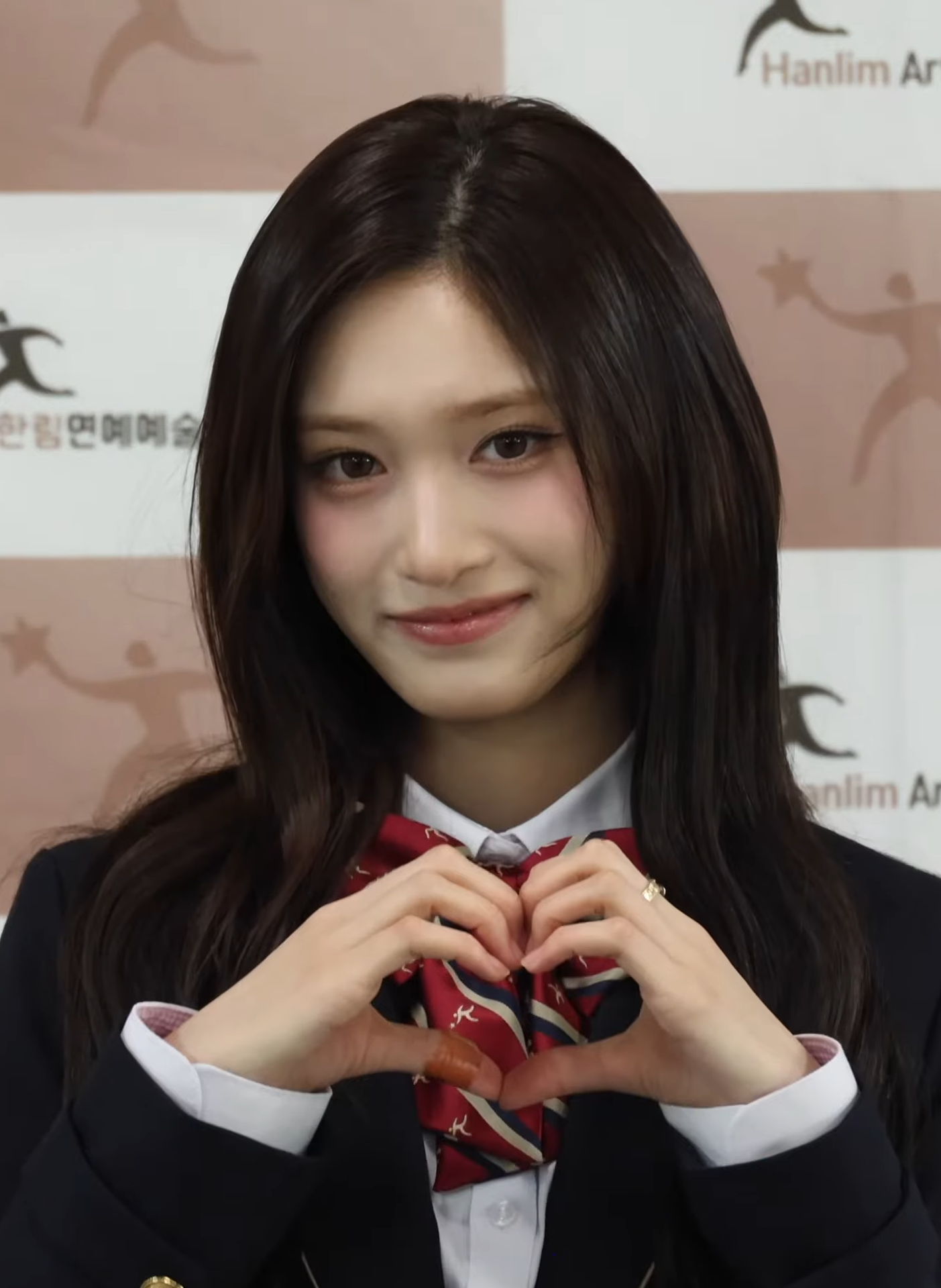
Leeseo, graduated in 2026

Performers graduated from Acting Department
Graduated in	Name	Korean name	Band	Notes
2012	P.O	표지훈	Block B	
2012	Mino	송민호	WINNER	
2012	Taemin	태민	Shinee	
2012	Incredivle	인크레더블	—N/a	Also known as Jeong Hyeon-tae (정현태)
2013	Go Won-hee	고원희	—N/a	
2013	Park Subin	박수빈	Dal Shabet	
2013	Krystal Jung	크리스탈	f(x)	Also known as Jung Soo-jung (정수정)
2015	Choi Yu-jin	최유진	CLC	
2016	Cha Eun-woo	차은우	Astro	Also known as Lee Dong-min (이동민)
2017	Shin Dong-woo	신동우	—N/a	
2017	Song Yuvin	송유빈	Myteen	
2018	Kwon Chae-won	권채원	DIA	Also known as Eunchae (은채)
2018	Hwiyoung	휘영	SF9	Also known as Kim Young-kyun (김영균)
2018	Kwon Eun-bin	권은빈	CLC	
2018	Bong Jae-hyun	봉재현	Golden Child	
2019	Kim Chaewon	김채원	Le Sserafim	
2019	Hur Hyun-jun	허현준	The Boyz (Note: 2017-2019)	
2020	Myung Hyung-seo	명형서	Busters (Note: 2017-2020)	
2021	Choi Hyun-wook	최현욱	—N/a	
2021	Cha Woong-ki	차웅기	TO1, AHOF	
2021	Yoo Seon-ho	유선호	Unknown	
2023	Minji	민지	NewJeans	Also known as Kim Min-ji (김민지)
2025	Moon Seong-hyun	문성현	—N/a	
2026	Kim Soo-min	김수민	TripleS	
2026	Kim Chae-won	김채원	TripleS	
2026	Leeseo	이서	Ive	Also known as Lee Hyun-seo (이현서)

=== Musical Theatre Department ===
Performers graduated from Musical Theatre Department
Graduated in	Name	Korean name	Band	Notes
2012	Shin Jae-ha	신재하	—N/a	
2015	Yeo Joo-ha	여주하	—N/a	Also known as Choi Moon-jung (최문정)
2015	Lee Sae-rom	이새롬	Fromis 9	
2018	Nancy	낸시	Momoland	
2018	Cho Yi-hyun	조이현	—N/a	
2020	Chaeryeong	채령	Itzy	
2021	Song Hyeong-jun	송형준	X1	

=== Practical Dance Department ===
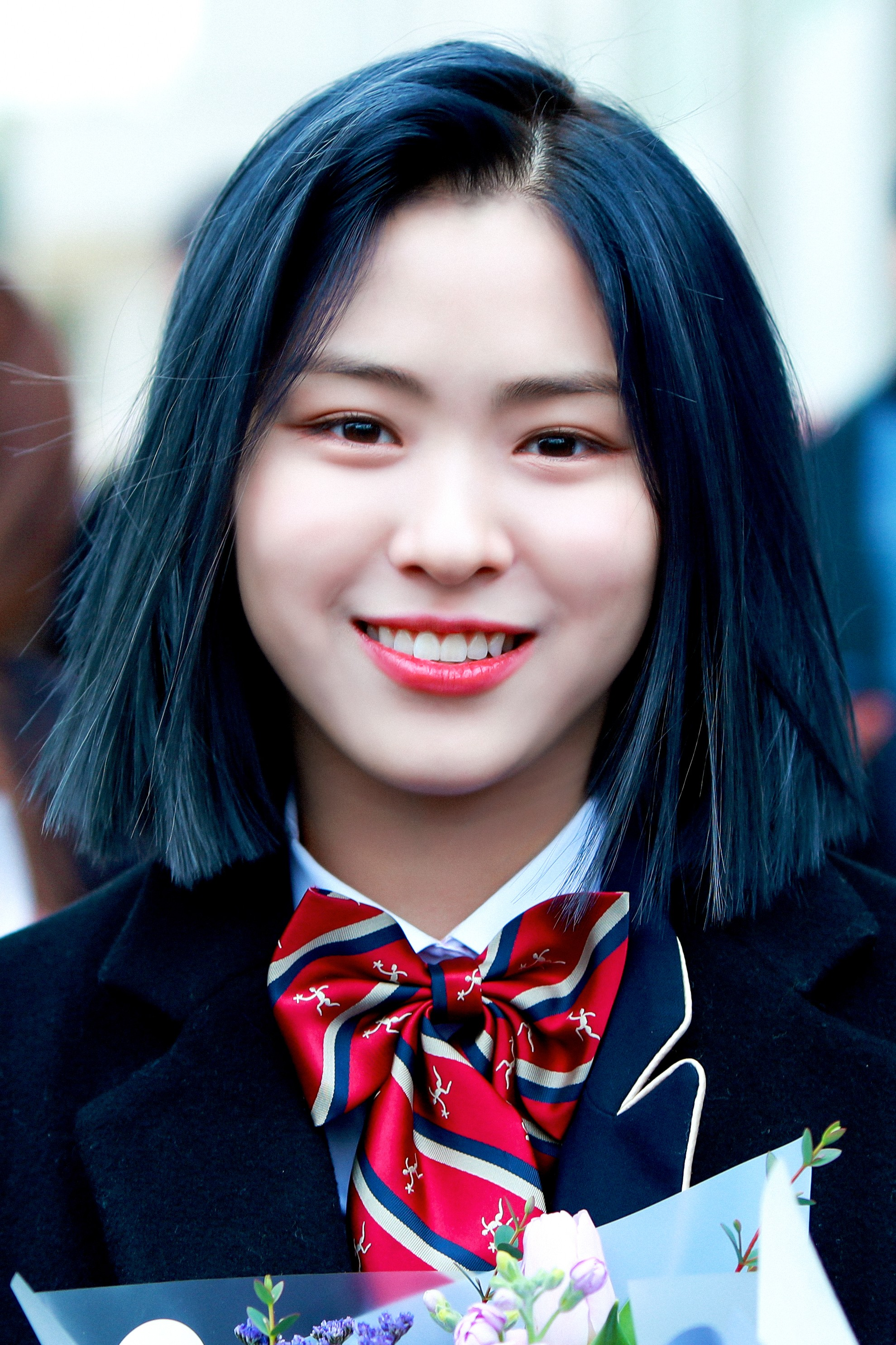
Ryujin, graduated in 2020

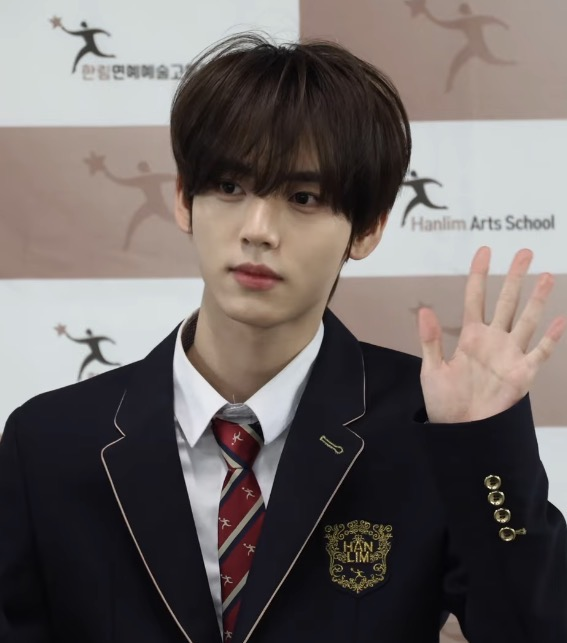
Han Yu-jin, graduated in 2026

Performers graduated from Dance Department
Graduated in	Name	Korean name	Band	Notes
2013	Moon Jong-up	문종업	B.A.P	
2014	Ong Seong-wu	옹성우	Wanna One	
2014	Yook Sung-jae	육성재	BtoB	
2015	Jinjin	진진	Astro	Also known as Park Jin-woo (박진우)
2016	Kino	키노	Pentagon	Also known as Kang Hyung-gu (강형구)
2016	Woodz	조승연	Uniq	
2016	Yugyeom	유겸	Got7	
2018	Wooyoung	우영	Ateez	
2020	Ryujin	류진	Itzy	
2021	Beomgyu	범규	Tomorrow X Together	Also known as Choi Beom-gyu (최범규)
2021	HueningKai	휴닝카이	Tomorrow X Together	
2022	Yuna	유나	Itzy	
2022	Dongpyo	손동표	X1	
2022	Sunoo	선우	ENHYPEN	Also known as Kim Seonwoo (김선우)
2022	Jay	제이	ENHYPEN	Also known as Park Jong-seong (박종성)
2022	Kangmin	강민	Verivery	
2023	Harry-June	한해리준	DKB	
2023	Lee Jin-woo	이진우	Teen Teen	
2025	Han Ji-hoon	한지훈	TWS	
2025	Lynn	린	tripleS	Also known as Kawakami Rin (川上 凜)
2026	Han Yu-jin	한유진	Zerobaseone, And2ble	
2026	Jeong Hye-rin	정혜린	tripleS	
2026	Ryu Sa-rang	유사랑	izna	

=== Music Department ===
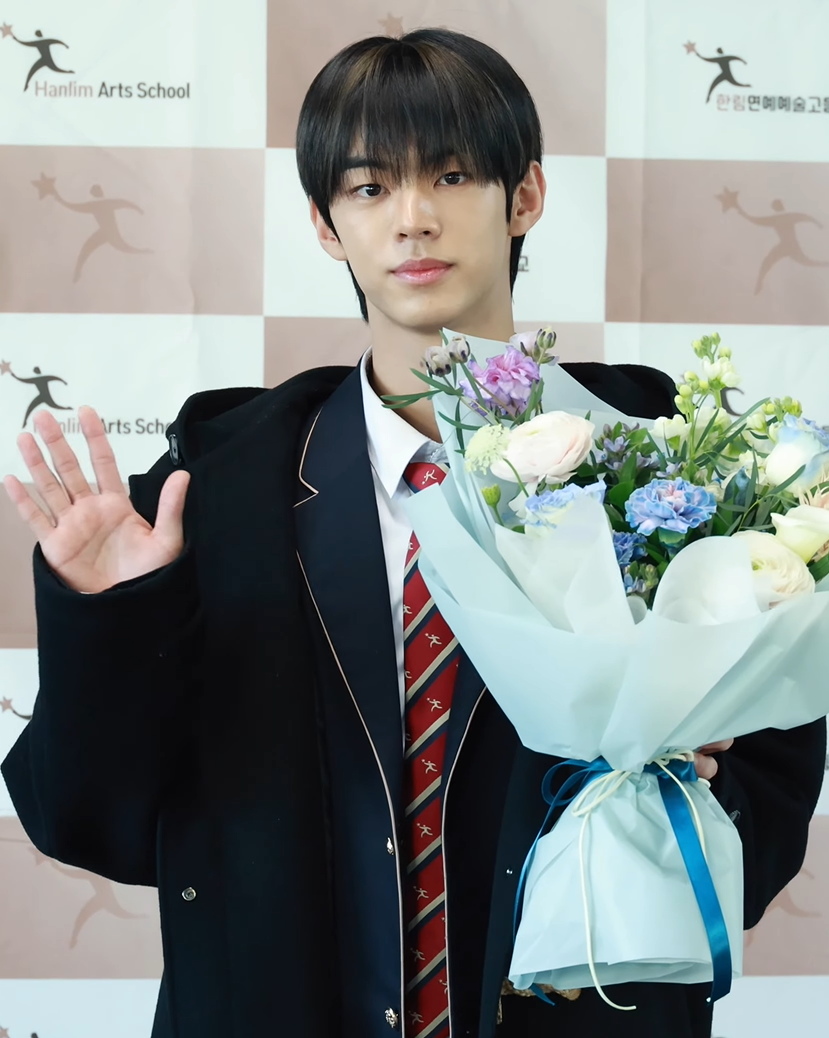
Dohoon, graduated in 2024

Performers graduaded from Music Department
Graduated in	Name	Korean name	Band	Notes
2012	Yezi	예지	Fiestar	Also known as Lee Ye-ji (이예지)
2013	Shin Dong-ho	동호	U-KISS	
2013	Ryu Won-jeong	류원정	—N/a	
2013	Ko Ho-jung	고호정	Hotshot	
2014	Hyuk	혁	VIXX	Also known as Han Sang-hyuk (한상혁)
2016	Yerin Baek	백예린	15&	
2016	Jamie	박지민	15&	
2016	Ahn Sol-bin	솔빈	Laboum	
2017	Dahyun	다현	Twice	
2018	Yeri	예리	Red Velvet	
2018	JooE	주이	Momoland	Also known as Lee Joo-won (이주원)
2018	Hong Joo-chan	홍주찬	Golden Child	
2018	Yoo Yeon-jung	유연정	WJSN	
2018	Chuu	츄	Loona	Also known as Kim Ji-woo (김지우)
2018	Kim Lip	김립	Loona	Also known as Kim Jung-eun (김정은)
2018	ROCKY	라키	Astro	Also known as Park Min-hyuk (박민혁)
2018	Rothy	로시	—N/a	Also known as Kang Joo-hee (강주희)
2019	Chaeyoung	채영	Twice	
2019	Tzuyu	쯔위	Twice	
2019	Yoon San-ha	윤산하	Astro	
2019	Giuk	기욱	Onewe	Also known as Lee Ki-wook (이기욱) and CyA (키아)
2019	Choi Bo-min	최보민	Golden Child	
2020	Jeon Somi	전소미	—N/a	
2021	Taehyun	태현	Tomorrow X Together	
2023	Jungwon	정원	ENHYPEN	
2024	Dohoon	김도훈	TWS	

=== Fashion Model Department ===
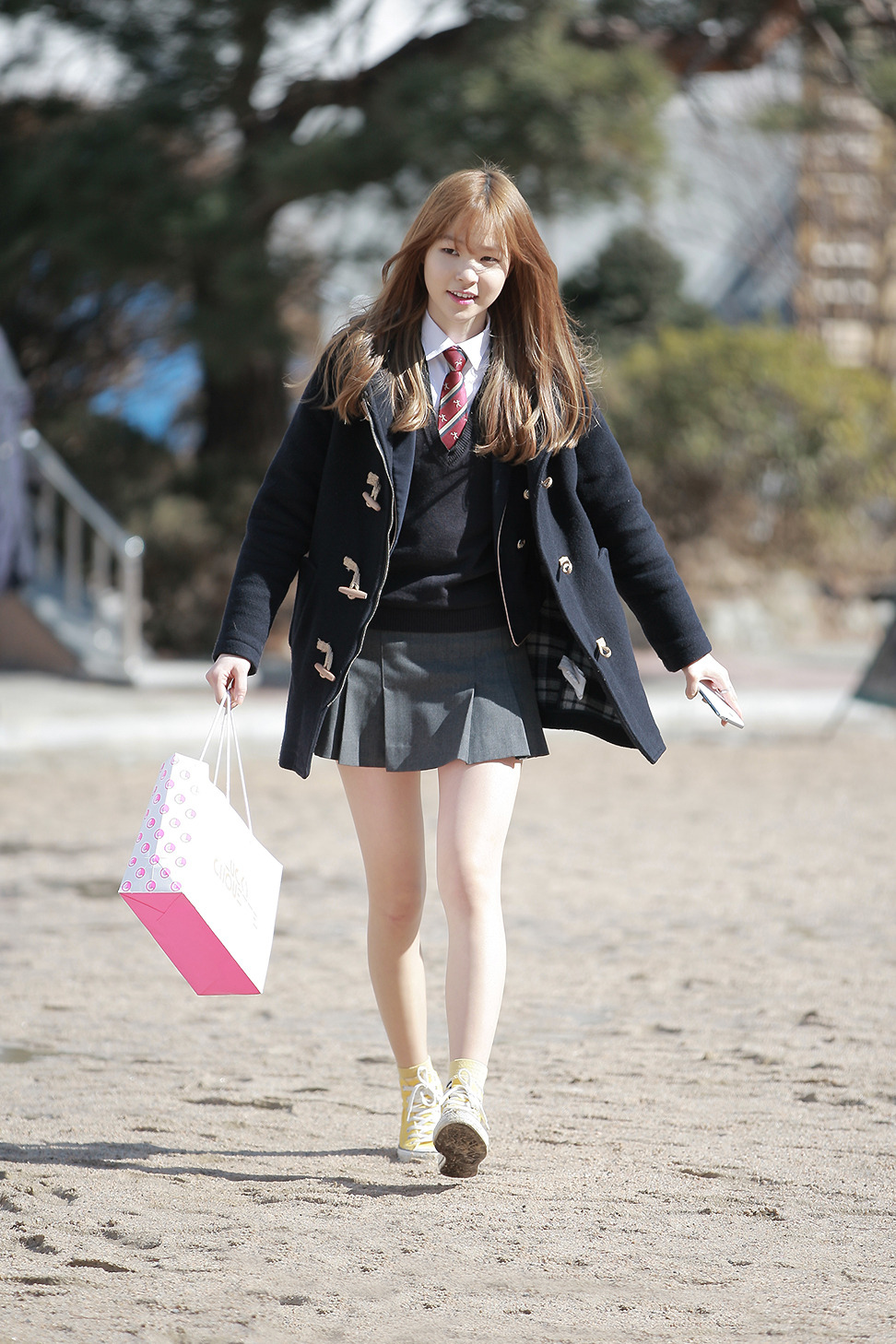
Jin Jung-seon, graduated in 2014

Performers graduated from Fashion Model Department
Graduated in	Name	Korean name	Notes
2014	Kim So-won	김소정	GFriend member
2015	Hyun Ji Shin	신현지	
2014	Jin Jung-seon	진정선	
2015	Lee Ho-jung	이호정	
2016	Nam Yoon-su	남윤수	
2016	Kim Jin-kyung	김진경	

=== Film Making Department ===
Performers graduated from Film Making Department
Graduated in	Name	Korean name	Band	Notes
2015	Woozi	우지	Seventeen	
2025	Park Shi-on	박시온	tripleS	
2026	Kim Si-a	김시아	—N/a	
