= Cabbage Your Life =

2026 South Korean television series

- Promotional poster
- Hangul: 심우면 연리리
- Lit.: Yeonri Village, Simu Township
- RR: Simu-myeon Yeolli-ri
- MR: Simu-myŏn Yŏlli-ri
- Genre: Family drama; Comedy drama
- Written by: Song Jung-rim; Wang Hye-ji; Kim Eun-young; Choi So-jin
- Directed by: Choi Yeon-soo
- Starring: Park Sung-woong; Lee Soo-kyung; Lee Jin-woo; Lee Seo-hwan
- Country of origin: South Korea
- Original language: Korean
- No. of episodes: 12

Production
- Production company: Sim Story

Original release
- Network: KBS2
- Release: March 26 – June 11, 2026

Cabbage Your Life (Korean: 심우면 연리리) is a 2026 South Korean television series written by Song Jung-rim and Wang Hye-ji, directed by Choi Yeon-soo, and starring Park Sung-woong, Lee Soo-kyung, Lee Jin-woo, and Lee Seo-hwan. The series follows a city family who are forcibly relocated to Yeonriri, a rugged rural area known for its dopamine detox, where they must adjust to a starkly different way of life. It aired on KBS2 from March 26, to June 11, 2026, every Thursday at 21:50 (KST).

== Cast and characters ==
- Park Sung-woong as Sung Tae-hoon
- Lee Soo-kyung as Jo Mi-ryeo
- Lee Seo-hwan as Im Joo-hyung

The head of the village and Yeonri-ri's most respected elder.

- Nam Gwon-a as Nam Hye-sun

The head of the women's association and the driving force behind Yeonri-ri's influence.

- Lee Jin-woo as Seong Ji-cheon

Tae-hoon's son.

- Choi Gyu-ri as Lim Bo-mi

Joo-hyung's daughter.

== Production ==
In September 2025, Park Sung-woong and Lee Soo-kyung were reportedly cast. The next month, Ten Asia reported that Lee Seo-hwan and Lee Jin-woo joined the cast. On February 10, 2026, Park and Lee S.K. were confirmed to lead the series. Produced under Sim Story, the series is a family drama genre directed by Choi Yeon-soo, and written by Song Jung-rim and Wang Hye-ji. Two days later, the appearances of Lee Seo-hwan, Nam Gwon-a, Lee Jin-woo, and Choi Gyu-ri were confirmed.

== Release ==
Cabbage Your Life was reportedly scheduled to premiere on KBS2 in March 2026. By February 2026, the series was confirmed to premiere on March 26, 2026, and airs every Thursday at 21:50 (KST).

== Viewership ==
Cabbage Your Life : South Korea viewers per episode (thousands)

Season	Episode number											
Season	1	2	3	4	5	6	7	8	9	10	11	12
1	501	389	439	N/A	N/A	N/A	N/A	N/A	N/A	N/A	N/A	N/A

Source: Audience measurement performed nationwide by Nielsen Korea.

Average TV viewership ratings
Ep.	Original broadcast date	Average audience share	
Ep.	Original broadcast date	Nielsen Korea	
Ep.	Original broadcast date	Nationwide	Seoul
1	March 26, 2026	2.7% (15th)	2.4% (16th)
2	April 2, 2026	2.0% (22nd)	N/A
3	April 9, 2026	2.1% (25th)	N/A
4	April 16, 2026	2.0% (23rd)	N/A
5	April 23, 2026	1.5% (30th)	N/A
6	April 30, 2026	1.6% (29th)	N/A
7	May 7, 2026	1.5% (28th)	N/A
8	May 14, 2026	1.6% (24th)	N/A
9	May 21, 2026	1.6% (28th)	N/A
10	May 28, 2026	1.6% (27th)	N/A
11	June 4, 2026	1.4% (31st)	N/A
12	June 11, 2026	1.6% (28th)	N/A
Average		1.8%	— (Note: Due to multiple unpublished ratings, the exact average rating is unknown.)
In the table above, the blue numbers represent the lowest ratings and the red numbers represent the highest ratings.
