= MYB =

MYB may refer to:

- MYB (gene), a gene that encodes a transcription factor
- Marylebone station, London, by National Rail station code
- Mbay language, by ISO 639-3 code
- MyB, South Korean girl group
