= Maroo Entertainment =

South Korean entertainment company

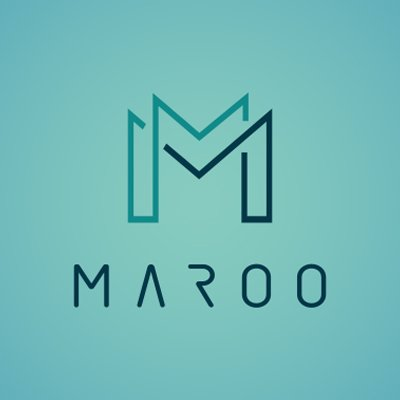
- Native name: 마루기획 주식회사
- Industry: Entertainment
- Genre: K-pop; R&B; Ballad; Rock
- Founded: July 15, 2010
- Headquarters: Seoul, South Korea
- Number of locations: 2F, 268-16 Nonhyeon-dong, Gangnam-gu
- Key people: Lee Jae-hyuk (CEO)
- Owners: IHQ (47.14%)
- Website: maroocorp.co.kr

Maroo Entertainment (Korean: 마루기획) is a South Korean entertainment company established in 2010. The company operates as a talent agency, music production and distribution company, and film/drama production company. The company currently manages idol group Ghost9.

== History ==
Maroo Entertainment was firstly active as a Mnet Media music label in 2007, debuting boy group Supernova.

In July 2010, Maroo Entertainment officially registered as a legal independent company.

In 2012, former SeeYa member Kim Yeon-ji joined Maroo as a soloist.

In February 2014, Maroo debuted their first girl group 1PS. In May 2014, OneTwo member Song Ho-beom joined Maroo.

In February 2015, former LPG member Han Young, joined Maroo. In May 2015, actor Ha Seok-jin joined Maroo. Maroo debuted their second girl group MyB in August 2015. On October 21, 2015, singer and entertainer Kim Jong-kook joined Maroo.

On December 28, 2016, former The Ark member Euna Kim joined Maroo.

On January 1, 2017, Maroo debuted their third girl group BONUSBaby. On June 14, 2017, Park Ji-hoon officially signed a contract with Maroo. On August 4, 2017, actress Bae Geu-rin joined Maroo.

On May 23, 2018, Maroo debuted former The Ark member Euna Kim and Minju as the duo KHAN. Later that month, Norazo member Jo Bin joined Maroo. On August 21, 2018, Norazo made a comeback under Maroo after adding new member Won Heum. On September 10, 2018, Maroo announced that BONUSbaby member Kongyoo would leave the group to focus on her studies, and that the group will take a hiatus.

On September 18, 2019, Maroo debuted Produce X 101 trainees Lee Jin-woo, Lee Tae-seung and Lee Woo-jin as Teen Teen.

On September 23, 2020, Maroo debuted their new boy group Ghost9.

In June 2022, IHQ acquired 47.14% of the company shares.

== Artists ==
=== Recording artists ===
Groups

- Ghost9

Duets

- Norazo

== Former artists ==
=== Former recording artists ===
- Kim Yeon-ji (2012–2017)
- 1PS (2014–2015)
- Song Ho-beom (2014–????)
- Han Young (2015–2018)
- MyB (2015–2016)
  - Jookyung (2015–2016)
  - Heejoo (2015–2016)
  - U-Jung (2015–2016)
  - G-won (2015–2016)
- ASHGRAY (2016)
- Supernova (2007–2018)
- BONUSBaby (2017–2020)
  - Kongyoo (2017–2018)
- KHAN (2018–2019)
- Teen Teen (2019-2021)
- Park Ji-hoon (2017–2024)

=== Former entertainers ===
- Kim Jong-kook (2015–2018)

=== Former actors ===
- Ha Seok-jin (2015–2018)
- Bae Geu-rin (2017)
- Kwon Yohan (2018–????)
- Lee Sang-mi (2018–????)
- Seo Eun-chae
- Dabee
- Choi Moon-hee
- Kwon Seung-woo
