= Namib (disambiguation) =

The Namib is a desert in Southern Africa.

Namib or Namibe may also refer to:

- Namib (TV series), South Korean TV series
- Namibe Province, Angola
  - Moçâmedes, capital of the province, naned Namibe until 2016

== See also ==
- Namibia, country in Southern Africa
