= Euna Kim =

American rapper (born 1994)

Euna Kim 유나킴
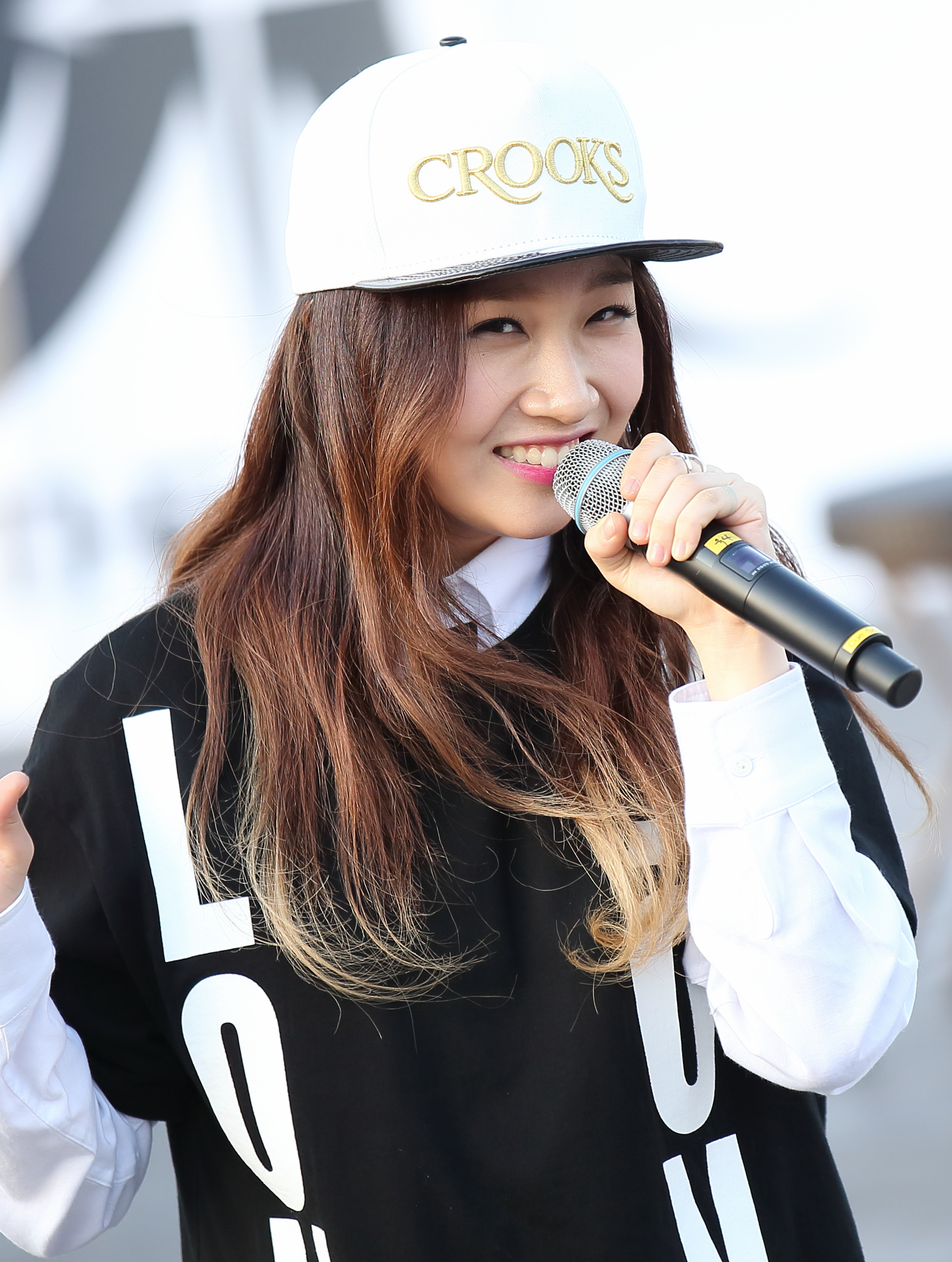
- Kim in 2016

Background information
- Born: October 27, 1994 (age 32); New York, United States
- Genres: K-pop; Hip hop; R&B
- Occupations: Singer; rapper
- Instrument: Vocals
- Years active: 2011–2021
- Label: Maroo Entertainment

Euna Kim (Korean: 유나킴; born October 27, 1994), is an American retired singer and rapper, previously based in South Korea. She appeared as a contestant on the South Korean survival reality shows Superstar K 3 (2011), Unpretty Rapstar 3 (2016), and The Unit (2017).

== Career ==
Kim began her singing career in 2011 as a contestant on the television talent show Superstar K 3, after which she joined YG Entertainment. She was meant to debut as a member of a new girl group, but she left the label in 2013 before debuting.

Kim made her solo debut in 2014 with the single "Without You Now" featuring Yoon Mi-rae, Tiger JK, and Bizzy. In 2015, she joined the short-lived girl group The Ark, which later disbanded in 2016 after releasing one song.

In 2016, Kim participated in the rap competition show Unpretty Rapstar 3. Later that year, she signed with Maroo Entertainment. In 2017, she competed in the survival reality show The Unit, finishing in 10th place. In 2018, Kim and former The Ark member Jeon Min-ju formed the duo KHAN and released the single, "I'm Your Girl?". The duo also participated in Season 1 of Vocal Play.

Although Maroo had quietly removed KHAN from the artist section on their official site in 2019, Kim did not confirm the duo's disbandment until March 2020, in a response to a comment on her personal Instagram. In a 2021 interview, Kim revealed that KHAN was originally supposed to have had a comeback almost immediately following their debut in 2018. However, their comeback was continually pushed back due to various songwriters struggling to create a "hit song" that matched Maroo's vision for the group's comeback concept. These delays led to the group being put on an indefinite hiatus by the company - which ultimately led to their disbandment.

On May 24, 2021, Kim announced her retirement from the entertainment industry through her personal Instagram.

== Personal life ==
After retiring from the entertainment industry and Korea entirely, Kim has become a Christian missionary.

=== Relationship and marriage ===
On May 24, 2021, Kim posted on her personal Instagram that she has moved back permanently to the United States, is planning on getting married. She married her non-celebrity fiancé in November 2021.

June 11, 2023, Kim gave birth to a little boy they named "Reuel".

== Discography ==
=== Singles ===
Title	Year	Peak chart position	Sales
Title	Year	KOR	Sales
"Without you now" (이젠 너 없이도) feat. Yoon Mi-rae, Tiger JK, Bizzy	2014	9	KOR: 286,770+
"Good Bye Rain" (비별) with Jeon Min-ju, feat. Vromance's Hyun-kyu	2014	35	KOR: 78,783+
"Love Therapy" (러브테라피) with Cosmic Girls' Exy, feat. Zia	2017	—	—N/a
"—" denotes release did not chart.

== Filmography ==
=== Reality show ===
Year	Title	TV Network	Notes
2011	Superstar K3	Mnet	Eliminated in casting audition round
2016	Unpretty Rapstar 3	Mnet	Eliminated in episode 8
2017–2018	The Unit	KBS	Eliminated in final round
