= Knock-Off (TV series) =

Upcoming South Korean television series

- Hangul: 넉오프
- RR: Neogopeu
- MR: Nŏgop'ŭ
- Genre: Black comedy; Crime drama
- Written by: Han Jung-hoon
- Directed by: Park Hyun-seok
- Starring: Kim Soo-hyun; Jo Bo-ah
- Country of origin: South Korea
- Original language: Korean

Production
- Production companies: SLL; Arc Media

Original release
- Network: Disney+

Knock-Off (Korean: 넉오프) is an upcoming South Korean black comedy television series written by Han Jung-hoon, directed by Park Hyun-seok, and starring Kim Soo-hyun and Jo Bo-ah. The series depicts a man's rise from office worker to counterfeit kingpin after the 1997 Asian financial crisis.

Originally scheduled to be released on Disney+ in April 2025, Disney Korea temporarily postponed the release of the series due to the controversy surrounding Kim Soo-hyun's relationship with the late actress Kim Sae-ron.

== Synopsis ==
Kim Seong-jun is an office worker who loses his job during the 1997 Asian financial crisis. Unemployed, he turns to counterfeiting and rises to become vice president of Saemmul Market, a center of the counterfeit trade, later expanding his operation from South Korea into the international market. His former lover, Song Hye-jeong, is a special judicial police offer assigned to crack down on counterfeit goods, and she pursues him.

== Cast and characters ==
=== Main ===
- Kim Soo-hyun as Kim Seong-jun

He enters the world of counterfeit goods and becomes the vice president of Saemul Market after losing his job due to the IMF crisis.

- Jo Bo-ah as Song Hye-jeong

Sung-joon's ex-lover and a special judicial police officer in charge of cracking down on counterfeit goods.

=== Supporting ===
- Yoo Jae-myung as Kim Man-sik

Seong-joon's father who also introduced his son into the world of counterfeit goods.

- Kim Eui-sung as Bae Pil-gu

Nu-ri's uncle who took over the Busan counterfeit market.

- Bang Hyo-rin as Bae Nu-ri

The president of Saemul Market.

- Kwon Nara as Moon Yoo-bin

A designer who makes S-class counterfeit bags.

- Park Se-wan as Moon Da-bin

Yoo-bin's younger sister who also makes counterfeit bags.

- Kim Hye-eun as Jang Ji-soo

Nu-ri's lawyer and strategist.

- Ko Kyu-pil as Donkas

Nu-ri's right-hand man and the action captain of Saemul Market.

- Jung Man-sik as Lee Ki-bong

A detective who crackdown counterfeit goods.

- Kang Mal-geum as Jegal Hyun-sook

An investigator of the counterfeit crackdown task force team.

- Jo Woo-jin
- Choi Gyu-ri
- Woo Do-hwan

=== Special appearances ===
- Lee Jung-eun as Park Ae-ja

Sung-joon's mother who is a retired civil servant who devoted her life to her family.

- Kim Mu-yeol as Baek Jong-min

The prosecutor of the Central District Prosecutors' Office and head of the counterfeit crackdown task force team to track down Nu-ri and Sung-joon, who have taken over the counterfeit market.

== Production ==
=== Development ===
The series is a black comedy genre, and director Park Hyun-seok and writer Han Jung-hoon would be working once again after Song of the Bandits (2023). In addition, Arc Media and SLL would be jointly managed the production.

According to SPOTV News report, the series was confirmed to have two seasons with nine episodes each. News1 reported that the production team reorganized its schedule and filming would begin in earnest.

=== Casting ===
Kim Soo-hyun and Kim Si-eun were reportedly cast for the series in March and April 2024, respectively. Yoo Jae-myung, Ko Kyu-pil, Jo Bo-ah, Jo Woo-jin, Lee Jung-eun, Kim Eui-sung, Kang Mal-geum, Kim Hye-eun and Choi Gyu-ri were reportedly cast in May 2024. Kwon Na-ra, Kim Mu-yeol, and Woo Do-hwan were cast in July 2024. Kim Soo-hyun and Jo were confirmed to appear as the lead actors of the series in August 2024. On August 29, 2024, Star News reported that according to multiple sources Kim Si-eun had decided not to appear in the series and the production team was considering to cast Bang Hyo-rin as her replacement. The next month, Yoo, Lee, Kim Eui-sung, Bang, Kwon, Park Se-wan, Kim Hye-eun, Kim Mu-yeol, Jung Man-sik, and Kang were confirmed to appear to complete the casting lineup of the series.

== Release ==
On March 21, 2025, The Walt Disney Company Korea announced that they had temporarily postponed the release of the series, which was scheduled for a possible April 2025 premiere, due to the controversy surrounding Kim Soo-hyun's relationship with the late actress Kim Sae-ron. In April 2025, the filming of the drama was indefinitely suspended due to the case of Kim Soo-hyun.
