= Marry My Husband =

2024 South Korean television series

- Promotional poster
- Hangul: 내 남편과 결혼해줘
- Hanja: 내 男便과 結婚해줘
- RR: Nae nampyeongwa gyeolhonhaejwo
- MR: Nae namp'yŏn'gwa kyŏrhonhaejwŏ
- Genre: Romantic comedy; Fantasy; Revenge; Workplace; Time travel
- Created by: Studio Dragon
- Based on: Marry My Husband by Sung So-jak
- Written by: Shin Yoo-dam
- Directed by: Park Won-guk; Han Jin-seon
- Starring: Park Min-young; Na In-woo; Lee Yi-kyung; Song Ha-yoon
- Music by: Park Sung-il
- Country of origin: South Korea
- Original language: Korean
- No. of episodes: 16

Production
- Executive producers: Kim Ryun-hee (CP); Son Ja-young (CP); Lee Joon-hee
- Producers: Kim Je-hyun; Yoo Sang-won; Kim Dong-gu; Kwak Ji-hoon; Kwon Kyung-hyun
- Cinematography: Moon Myung-hwan; Choi Young-gi; Kim Gi-hoon; Lee Do-hyun
- Editors: Kim Soo-jin; Jeon Hyun-jung
- Running time: 70 minutes
- Production companies: DK E&M

Original release
- Network: tvN
- Release: January 1 – February 20, 2024

Marry My Husband (Korean: 내 남편과 결혼해줘) is a 2024 South Korean television series written by Shin Yoo-dam, and starring Park Min-young, Na In-woo, Lee Yi-kyung, and Song Ha-yoon. It is based on a web novel of the same name, which was also serialized as a webtoon. It aired on tvN from January 1, 2024 to February 20, 2024, every Monday and Tuesday at 20:50 (KST). It is also available for streaming on TVING in South Korea, and on Amazon Prime Video in selected regions worldwide excluding South Korea and China.

== Plot ==
The series begins with the events on April 12, 2023, where Kang Ji-won is terminally ill with gastric cancer. After catching her husband, Park Min-hwan, in bed with her best friend, Jeong Su-min, a scuffle ensues in which Ji-won is accidentally killed by Min-hwan. Ji-won then suddenly finds herself at her workplace in the year 2013, having been sent back in time following the intervention of her late father's spirit. As she relives her life with the same knowledge and information as in the previous timeline, she discovers that in order to live a better life, she must transfer her misfortune to others. She then resolves to have Su-min marry Min-hwan in order to exact revenge and escape her miserable fate.

As the series progresses, she finds out that her manager, Yoo Ji-hyuk, was also sent back in time following his death in a car accident. Ji-hyuk, who knows that Min-hwan was behind Ji-won's death and, having fallen in love with Ji-won in the previous timeline, resolves to protect Ji-won at all costs. After manipulating Su-min into marrying Min-hwan, Ji-won begins a relationship with Ji-hyuk, but his ex-fiancée, Oh Yu-ra, interferes.

During the latter half of the series, Yu-ra recruits Su-min and Min-hwan to aid her in her attempt to kill Ji-won, but Su-min and Min-hwan's relationship dissolves as Min-hwan has an affair with Yu-ra. Meanwhile, Ji-won's colleague and friend, Yang Ju-ran, ends up unintentionally acquiring Ji-won's cancer from the previous timeline. Fortunately, the cancer is detected in time for Ju-ran to receive medical treatment early, seemingly sparing both Ji-won and Ju-ran from the fate of dying young from cancer.

By the end of the series, Min-hwan is killed by Su-min, Su-min is arrested and incarcerated, and Yu-ra died in a car accident after her attempt to murder Ji-won is exposed and right before she planned to flee Korea. The series ends with Ji-won and Ji-hyuk going to an art exhibit on April 12, 2023. Having successfully avoided their misfortunes from the previous timeline, Ji-won and Ji-hyuk get married, have children, and seemingly live out their lives in peace.

== Cast and characters ==
=== Main ===
- Park Min-young as Kang Ji-won
  - Kim Ah-hyun as young Kang Ji-won

An ordinary woman who spends her days burdened by an incompetent husband, neglectful in-laws, and a hard work life, and becomes a cancer patient at a young age. She resolves to escape her fate and enact her revenge by having her best friend marry her husband in a new timeline.

- Na In-woo as Yoo Ji-hyuk

Marketing manager of U&K Food who is Kang Ji-won's main support in her bid to have a happier life whilst enacting her revenge. He is motivated by his feelings for Ji-won.

- Lee Yi-kyung as Park Min-hwan

Ji-won's husband before her return. He is the assistant manager of U&K Food's Marketing Team 1.

- Song Ha-yoon as Jeong Su-min
  - Uhm Seo-hyun as young Jeong Su-min

A manipulative woman who claims to be Ji-won's "best friend" and has an affair with Min-hwan in both timelines. She is a member of U&K Food's Marketing Team 1.

- Lee Gi-kwang as Baek Eun-ho

Ji-won's high school classmate who is a handsome and popular chef.

=== Supporting ===
==== U&K Group employees and staff ====
- Gong Min-jeung as Yang Ju-ran

Ji-won's co-worker who is the assistant manager of U&K Food's Marketing Team 1.

- Choi Gyu-ri as Yoo Hui-yeon

Member of U&K Food's Marketing Team 1. She is also Yoo Ji-hyuk's younger sister.

- Kim Joong-hee as Kim Gyeong-uk

Ji-won's boss who is the manager of U&K Food's Marketing Team 1.

- Ha Do-kwon as Lee Suk-jun

Han-il's right-hand man and the head of U&K Group's Strategic Planning.

==== Family of the main cast ====
- Moon Sung-keun as Yoo Han-il

Ji-hyuk and Hui-yeon's grandfather who founded U&K Group.

- Jung Kyung-soon as Kim Ja-ok

Min-hwan's mother.

- Jung Suk-yong as Kang Hyun-mo

Ji-won's father who is a truck driver.

==== Friends of the main cast ====
- Cho Jin-se as Cho Dong-seok

Ji-hyuk's favorite junior and family-like younger brother. He is the owner of a fried chicken restaurant "Fry Me."

- Moon Soo-young as Kim Shin-woo

Dong-seok's partner at the fried chicken restaurant "Fry Me."

- Bae Geu-rin as Ha Ye-ji

Ji-won, Soo-min, and Eun-ho's high school classmate. She bullied Ji-won back then.

- Jang Jae-ho as Lee Jae-won

Joo-ran's unemployed husband.

=== Extended ===
- Jung Jae-seong as Wang Heung-in

U&K Food's managing director.

- Kang Sang-jun as Yoo Sang-jong

Min-hwan's friend.

- BoA as Oh Yu-ra

Ji-hyuk's ex-fiancée.

=== Special appearances ===
- Choi Gwang-il as Choi Nam-hyeon

A taxi driver later revealed to be Ji-won's father in disguise.

- Lee Jeong-eun as Hee-sook

Ji-won's estranged mother.

- Kim Hyun as Lee Myung-ja

Soo-min's biological mother.

== Original soundtrack ==
=== Part 1 ===
Released on January 2, 2024
| No. | Title | Lyrics | Music | Artist | Length |
|---|---|---|---|---|---|
| 1. | "Bad Liar" (연국) | Lee Chi-hoon | Park Sung-il | Lyn | 4:10 |
| 2. | "Bad Liar" (연국; Inst.) | | Park Sung-il | | 4:10 |
| Total length: | | | | | 8:20 |

=== Part 2 ===
Released on January 9, 2024
| No. | Title | Lyrics | Music | Artist | Length |
|---|---|---|---|---|---|
| 1. | "From Today" (오늘부터) | Seo Dong-sung | Park Sung-il | Vincent Blue | 3:03 |
| 2. | "From Today" (오늘부터; Inst.) | | Park Sung-il | | 3:03 |
| Total length: | | | | | 6:06 |

=== Part 3 ===
Released on January 15, 2024
| No. | Title | Lyrics | Music | Artist | Length |
|---|---|---|---|---|---|
| 1. | "My All Dreams Come True" (내겐 아무 소원 남아있지 않아요) | Lee Chi-hoon | Park Sung-il | Car, the Garden | 4:16 |
| 2. | "My All Dreams Come True" (내겐 아무 소원 남아있지 않아요; Inst.) | | Park Sung-il | | 4:16 |
| Total length: | | | | | 8:32 |

=== Part 4 ===
Released on January 23, 2024
| No. | Title | Lyrics | Music | Artist | Length |
|---|---|---|---|---|---|
| 1. | "Wounds of Time" (시간의 상처) | Miriam | Judah Earl | Kim So-yeon | 4:37 |
| 2. | "Wounds of Time" (시간의 상처; Inst.) | | Judah Earl | | 4:37 |
| Total length: | | | | | 9:14 |

=== Part 5 ===
Released on February 6, 2024
| No. | Title | Lyrics | Music | Artist | Length |
|---|---|---|---|---|---|
| 1. | "The Journey" | Lee Chi-hoon | Park Sung-il | Kelly McRae | 4:08 |
| 2. | "The Journey" (Inst.) | | Park Sung-il | | 4:08 |
| Total length: | | | | | 8:16 |

Special Track

Released on February 27, 2024
| No. | Title | Lyrics | Music | Artist | Length |
|---|---|---|---|---|---|
| 1. | "Bad Liar" (연국) | Lee Chi-hoon | Park Sung-il | Yuqi | 3:50 |
| 2. | "Bad Liar" (연국; Inst.) | | Park Sung-il | | 3:50 |
| Total length: | | | | | 7:10 |

== Reception ==
=== Critical response ===
Marta Górna of Polish newspaper Gazeta Wyborcza described the series as an example of a "guilty pleasure", commenting that "it gives satisfaction and improves your mood" as long as you can "turn a blind eye [to] bombastic banality, exaggerated dialogues and a lot of slow motion". Puah Ziwei of NME gave the series four stars, stating that "while [the series] is not groundbreaking, it's not what it's trying to be either", adding that "letting Ji-won get her payback" and "unexpected twists" is "enough to keep viewers running back for more".

=== Viewership ===
Marry My Husband : South Korea viewers per episode (millions)

| Season | Episode number | | | | | | | | | | | | | | | | Average |
| Season | 1 | 2 | 3 | 4 | 5 | 6 | 7 | 8 | 9 | 10 | 11 | 12 | 13 | 14 | 15 | 16 | Average |
|---|---|---|---|---|---|---|---|---|---|---|---|---|---|---|---|---|---|
| 1 | 1.277 | 1.378 | 1.553 | 1.842 | 1.902 | 1.942 | 2.307 | 2.144 | 2.537 | 2.634 | 2.816 | 2.801 | 2.751 | 2.772 | 2.840 | 2.938 | 2.277 |

Source: Audience measurement performed nationwide by Nielsen Korea.

Average TV viewership ratings
| Ep. | Original broadcast date | Average audience share (Nielsen Korea) | |
| Ep. | Original broadcast date | Nationwide | Seoul |
|---|---|---|---|
| 1 | January 1, 2024 | 5.211% (1st) | 5.608% (1st) |
| 2 | January 2, 2024 | 5.891% (1st) | 6.246% (1st) |
| 3 | January 8, 2024 | 6.420% (1st) | 7.079% (1st) |
| 4 | January 9, 2024 | 7.595% (1st) | 7.861% (1st) |
| 5 | January 15, 2024 | 7.372% (2nd) | 8.019% (2nd) |
| 6 | January 16, 2024 | 7.773% (1st) | 8.329% (1st) |
| 7 | January 22, 2024 | 9.359% (1st) | 10.369% (1st) |
| 8 | January 23, 2024 | 8.642% (1st) | 9.177% (1st) |
| 9 | January 29, 2024 | 9.844% (1st) | 11.117% (1st) |
| 10 | January 30, 2024 | 10.714% (1st) | 11.765% (1st) |
| 11 | February 5, 2024 | 11.776% (1st) | 13.036% (1st) |
| 12 | February 6, 2024 | 10.518% (2nd) | 11.324% (2nd) |
| 13 | February 13, 2024 | 10.820% (1st) | 12.050% (1st) |
| 14 | February 14, 2024 | 11.050% (1st) | 11.617% (1st) |
| 15 | February 19, 2024 | 11.081% (1st) | 12.178% (1st) |
| 16 | February 20, 2024 | 11.951% (1st) | 12.485% (1st) |
| Average | | 9.126% | 9.891% |
In the table above, the blue numbers represent the lowest ratings and the red numbers represent the highest ratings.; This series aired on a cable channel/pay TV which normally has a relatively smaller audience compared to free-to-air TV/public broadcasters (KBS, SBS, MBC and EBS).

=== Accolades ===
==== Awards and nominations ====
Name of the award ceremony, year presented, category, nominee of the award, and the result of the nomination
| Award ceremony | Year | Category | Nominee / Work | Result | Ref. |
|---|---|---|---|---|---|
| Baeksang Arts Awards | 2024 | Best Supporting Actor | Lee Yi-kyung | Nominated | |

==== Listicles ====
Name of publisher, year listed, name of listicle, and placement
| Publisher | Year | Listicle | Placement | Ref. |
|---|---|---|---|---|
| NME | 2024 | The 10 best K-dramas of 2024 – so far | Included | |
| NME | 2024 | The 10 best Korean dramas of 2024 | 3rd place | |
| South China Morning Post | 2024 | The 15 best K-dramas of 2024 | 8th place | |
| Time Magazine | 2024 | The 10 Best K-Dramas of 2024 | 8th place | |

== Adaptation ==
On April 28, 2025, Amazon Prime Video, CJ ENM Japan, its parent Studio Dragon and Shochiku announced the J-drama adaptation of the series and its director Ahn Gil-ho who previously directed Netflix series The Glory. Starring Fuka Koshiba, Takeru Satoh, Sei Shirasi, and Super Eight member You Yokoyama, the series adaptation premiered on June 27, 2025.
