= Choi Gyu-ri =

South Korean actress (born 2000)

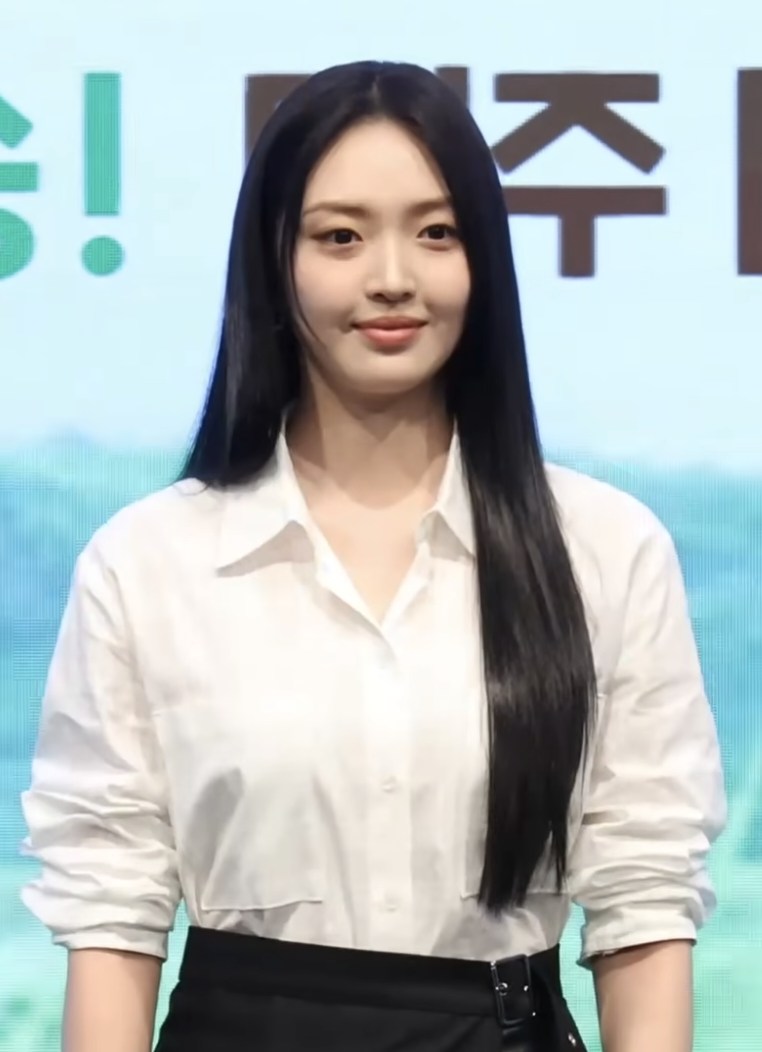
- Choi in March 2026
- Born: July 19, 2000 (age 25); Busan, South Korea
- Education: Korea National University of Arts (Department of Acting)
- Occupation: Actress
- Years active: 2021–present
- Agent: Hook Entertainment

Korean name
- Hangul: 최규리
- RR: Choe Gyuri
- MR: Ch'oe Kyuri

Choi Gyu-ri (Korean: 최규리; born July 19, 2000) is a South Korean actress.

== Personal life ==
Choi was born on July 19, 2000, in Busan, South Korea. She has a younger sister. She is currently enrolled in the Department of Acting at the Korea National University of Arts.

== Career ==
Choi made her debut in December 2021 with TV Chosun's television series Uncle, portraying the role of Shin Chae-young.

In February 2022, Choi had a cameo role in Disney+'s web series Rookie Cops. In November 2022, she appeared in tvN's television series Behind Every Star, playing the supporting role of Sunny Lim. In May 2023, she made a cameo in ENA's television series Battle for Happiness as a young Jang Mi-ho.

In January 2024, Choi gained popularity with tvN's television series Marry My Husband where she played the supporting role of Yoo Hee-yeon. Her performance in the series saw her Instagram followers increase from around 2,000 before the series aired to over 670,000 followers. In May 2024, she was announced to star in the upcoming television series Knock-Off.

== Filmography ==
=== Television series ===
Television series appearances
Year	Title	Role	Notes	Ref.
2021–2022	Uncle	Shin Chae-young	Episode 5–8, 15	
2022	Rookie Cops	Blind date girl	Cameo (Episode 4–5)	
2022	Behind Every Star	Sunny Lim		
2023	Battle for Happiness	young Jang Mi-ho	Cameo	
2024	Marry My Husband	Yoo Hee-yeon		
2026	Our Universe	Baek Se-yeon		
2026	Cabbage Your Life	Lim Bo-mi		
TBA	Knock-Off	Kim Seong-hui		

=== Film ===
Year	Title	Role	Notes	Ref.
2025	Love Untangled	Ma Sol-ji		
