= Uncle (South Korean TV series) =

2021 South Korean television series

- Promotional poster
- Hangul: 엉클
- RR: Eongkeul
- MR: Ŏngk'ŭl
- Genre: Music; Family drama
- Created by: Jeong Hwi-seok
- Based on: Uncle by Oliver Refson and Lilah Vandenburgh
- Developed by: Wavve
- Written by: Park Ji-sook
- Directed by: Ji Young-soo
- Starring: Oh Jung-se; Jeon Hye-jin; Lee Kyung-hoon; Park Sun-young; Lee Sang-woo; Lee Si-won
- Music by: Seol Ki-tae; Park Se-Joon
- Country of origin: South Korea
- Original language: Korean
- No. of episodes: 16

Production
- Executive producer: Hwang Bo Sang-mi
- Producers: Park Chae-won; Kim Seong-min; Hwang Eui-kyung
- Production companies: Hi Ground; Monster Union

Original release
- Network: TV Chosun
- Release: December 11, 2021 – January 30, 2022

Related
- Uncle (British TV series)

Uncle (Korean: 엉클) is a South Korean television series starring Oh Jung-se, Jeon Hye-jin, Lee Kyung-hoon, Park Sun-young, Lee Sang-woo and Lee Si-won. Based on the British sitcom of the same name, it is about an uncle who struggles to protect his nephew amid blatant discrimination. It aired on TV Chosun from December 11, 2021 to January 30, 2022.

== Synopsis ==
The series tells about an uncle taking care of his nephew in elementary school, who suffers anxiety and obsessive-compulsive disorders due to his sister's divorce.

== Cast ==
=== Main ===
- Oh Jung-se as Wang Jun-hyeok, an out-of-work musician who stands on the brink of betrayal and fraud.
- Jeon Hye-jin as Wang Jun-hee, Jun-hyeok's older sister who has chosen to divorce after twelve years of marriage to protect her child from domestic violence.
- Lee Kyung-hoon as Min Ji-hoo, Jun-hee's son and Jun-hyeok's nephew.
  - Jung Su-bin as adult Min Ji-hoo
- Park Sun-young as Park Hye-ryung, the president of Royal Momvely, a cafe for mothers in the Royal State, and the neighborhood's "queen bee".
- Lee Sang-woo as Joo Kyung-il, a father who raises his daughter alone after the death of his wife.
- Lee Si-won as Song Hwa-eum, an elementary school teacher.

=== Supporting ===
==== Royal Momvely ====
- Hwang Woo-seul-hye as Kim Yu-ra, the face manager of Royal Momvely and Hye-ryung's right-hand woman.
- Kim Ha-yeon as Ye So-dam, Yu-ra's daughter.
- Jung Soo-young as Cheon Da-jeong, a gold member of Royal Momvely.
- Park Se-chan as Park Si-wan, Da-jeong's son.
- Song Ah-kyung as Oh Hyeon-joo, a gold member of Royal Momvely.
- Lee Na-eun as Jung Soo-jin, a gold member of Royal Momvely.

==== People around Ji-hoo ====
- Song Ok-sook as Shin Hwa-ja, Ji-hoo's grandmother who serves as chairman of the third leading financial firm.
- Yoon Hee-seok as Min Kyung-soo, Jun-hee's immature ex-husband who plans various plots with his mother Hwa-ja to take custody of his son Ji-hoo.
- Bae Geu-rin as Kim Young-ah, Kyung-soo's lover.

==== Hot Bar ====
- Ahn Suk-hwan as Jang Ik, former drummer of visual rock band Troika and the president of Hot Bar, a safe haven for musicians.
- Jang Hee-ryung as Jang Yeon-joo, Jang Ik's daughter who is a guitarist.
- Choi Seung-yoon as Son Joo-no, Yeon-joo's new boyfriend who is a bassist.

==== Others ====
- Choi Gyu-ri as Shin Chae-young, Hye-ryung's daughter.
- Go Kyung-min as Shin Min-gi, Hye-ryung's son.
- Yoon Hye-bin as Joo No-eul, Kyung-il's daughter.
- Kim Min-cheol as Jang Do-kyung, a mysterious college student who lives in a rented apartment next to the Royal State in Gangnam's 4th district.
- as Mrs. Jang
- Kim Seung-wook as Hwang Geun-young

=== Extended ===
- Kim Tae-hyang as Yu-ra's husband who is a famous plastic surgeon.

=== Special appearance ===
- Choi Soo-young as a top star

== Production ==
The first script-reading of the cast occurred in August 2021.

== Viewership ==
Uncle : South Korea viewers per episode (millions)

Season	Episode number															
Season	1	2	3	4	5	6	7	8	9	10	11	12	13	14	15	16
1	0.433	0.596	1.049	1.001	1.259	1.084	1.385	1.424	1.685	1.631	1.640	1.902	1.869	2.042	1.908	1.681

Source: Audience measurement performed nationwide by Nielsen Korea

Average TV viewership ratings
Ep.	Original broadcast date	Average audience share (Nielsen Korea)	
Ep.	Original broadcast date	Nationwide	Seoul
1	December 11, 2021	2.351% (10th)	N/A
2	December 12, 2021	2.754% (9th)	2.529% (9th)
3	December 18, 2021	5.039% (1st)	5.567% (1st)
4	December 19, 2021	4.403% (2nd)	3.298% (7th)
5	December 25, 2021	5.562% (1st)	5.787% (1st)
6	December 26, 2021	4.351% (3rd)	4.309% (2nd)
7	January 1, 2022	5.785% (1st)	6.490% (1st)
8	January 2, 2022	6.300% (2nd)	6.571% (2nd)
9	January 8, 2022	7.926% (1st)	8.831% (1st)
10	January 9, 2022	6.970% (2nd)	7.542% (1st)
11	January 15, 2022	7.279% (1st)	7.350% (1st)
12	January 16, 2022	8.341% (1st)	9.484% (1st)
13	January 22, 2022	8.856% (1st)	9.489% (1st)
14	January 23, 2022	9.329% (1st)	10.456% (1st)
15	January 29, 2022	8.399% (1st)	8.902% (1st)
16	January 30, 2022	7.775% (1st)	8.308% (1st)
In the table above, the blue numbers represent the lowest ratings and the red numbers represent the highest ratings.; This series aired on a cable channel/pay TV which normally has a relatively smaller audience compared to free-to-air TV/public broadcasters (KBS, SBS, MBC and EBS).; N/A denotes ratings that were not released.
