= Norazo =

South Korean musical duo

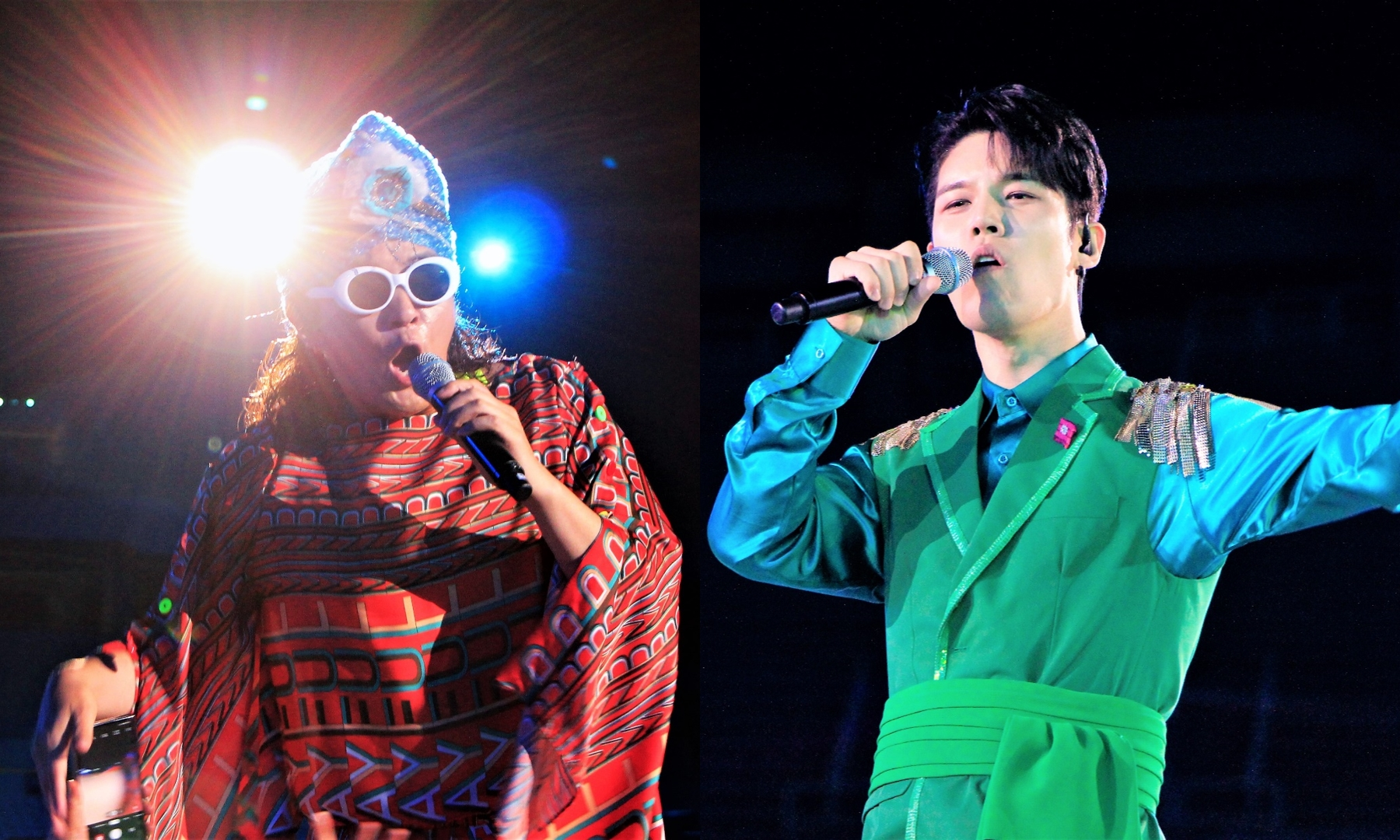
- Photo taken in 2019 (from left: Jo Bin, Won Heum)

Background information
- Origin: South Korea
- Genres: K-pop; EDM; rock
- Years active: 2005–present
- Labels: Stone Music Entertainment; Norazo Production; SQEX-UMP Records; Maroo Entertainment
- Members: Jo Bin; Won Heum
- Past members: Lee Hyuk
- Website: www.marooentertainment.com/artist_view.php?pk=3

Norazo (hangul: 노라조) is a musical male duo from South Korea, known for their eccentric stages and comical lyrics. The duo debuted in 2005 and originally consisted of Jo Bin and Lee Hyuk. After Lee Hyuk's departure, vocalist Won Heum joined as the new member. They were also participants in the musical variety show, Immortal Songs.

== History ==
Jo Bin and Lee Hyuk met accidentally as they started to use the same practice room. Jo cited Lee's good physique and singing skills that first caught his attention. Jo decided to trick Lee into joining him by telling him they were to sing ballads. Later they decided to do music different from the usual K-pop sound.

Lee Hyuk left the duo in February 2017. Vocalist Won Heum joined as the new member and they released their first song together on August 21, 2018.

== Members ==
Current

- Jo Bin - vocals
- Jo Won Heum - vocals

Former

- Lee Hyuk- vocals, guitar

== Discography ==
=== Studio albums ===
Title	Details	Peak chart positions	Sales
Title	Details	KOR	Sales
The First Album	Released: August 2, 2005; Label: Yedang Entertainment; Formats: CD, digital download, streaming	—	
Miseongnyeon jabulgama (미성년자불가마)	Released: March 20, 2007; Label: TOM Entertainment; Formats: CD, digital download, streaming	— (Note: Peaked at number 30 on the March 2007 MIAK monthly album chart.)	KOR: 3,556
Three Go	Released: November 20, 2008; Label: Winning Insight M; Formats: CD, digital download, streaming	—	
Hwangoltaltae (환골탈태)	Released: April 20, 2010; Label: Winning Insight M; Formats: CD, digital download, streaming	14	
Jeongukjepae (전국제패)	Released: November 4, 2011; Label: Winning Insight M; Formats: CD, digital download, streaming	15	KOR: 2,000

=== Extended plays ===
Title	Details
Bread (빵)	Released: November 19, 2020; Label: Maroo Entertainment; Formats: CD, digital download, streaming; Track list: 1. Bread (빵); 2. Bread (빵) (CCMan Remix); 3. Curry Ramen (카레라면); 4. Cider (사이다) (Spinning Pedals Remix by Lee Jung-hoon); 5. Shower (샤워) (Zumba GX Remix by Lee Jung-hoon); 6. Bread (빵) (Fenner Hardstyle Remix)
The Standard of Norazo 1 (Remake) (노라조의 정석 1)	Released: November 17, 2023; Label: Galaxy Corp., Norazo Entertainment; Formats: Digital download, streaming

=== Singles ===
Title	Year	Peak chart positions	Album
Title	Year	KOR	Album
"Happy Song" (해피송)	2005	—	The First Album
"Republic of Korea" (대한민국)	2006	—	Non-album single
"Fight Desperately" (사생결단)	2007	—	Miseongnyeon jabulgama
"Superman" (슈퍼맨)	2008	—	Three Go
"Mackerel" (고등어)	2009	—	Non-album singles
"Ambitious" (야심작)	2009	—	Non-album singles
"2010 Norazo Namagong World Cup Song" (2010 노라조 남아공 월드컵송)	2010	—	Non-album singles
"Help Me" (구해줘)	2010	49	Hwangoltaltae
"Pyojeoljak" (표절작) (ft. Kimm)	2010	73	Non-album single
"Doggies" (멍멍이)	2010	82	Jeongukjepae
"Stalls" (포장마차)	2011	56	Jeongukjepae
"Red Day" (빨간날)	2011	—	Jeongukjepae
"King of Sales" (판매왕)	2011	77	Jeongukjepae
"Woman (Female) Person" (여자사람)	2012	38	Non-album singles
"Wild Horse" (야생마) (feat. Noh Hong-chul)	2013	—	Non-album singles
"First Evo.7"	2013	—	Non-album singles
"Your Fortune" (니 팔자야)	2015	—	Non-album singles
"Sweet Dog & Alley Cat" (멍멍이와 냥이)	2016	—	Non-album singles
"Cider" (사이다)	2018	—	Non-album singles
"Shower" (샤워)	2019	—	Non-album singles
"Bread" (빵)	2020	—	Bread
"Vegetable" (야채)	2021	— (Note: "Vegetable" did not enter the Circle Digital Chart but peaked at number 67 on the component Download Chart.)	Non-album singles
"Buy Now, Think Later" (고민은 배송만 늦출 뿐)	2021	— (Note: "Buy Now, Think Later" did not enter the Circle Digital Chart but peaked at number 87 on the component Download Chart.)	Non-album singles
"A Worker" (일개미)	2023	— (Note: "A Worker" did not enter the Circle Digital Chart but peaked at number 61 on the component Download Chart.)	"Worker Needs Some Time Alone" (single)
"Gwangju Guards 'Bitgoeul'" (광주수호대 '빛고을')	2024	—	Non-album singles
"Let's Fly Let's Shine, Gwangju"	2024	—	Non-album singles
"Hai Yorokonde" (네 기꺼이)	2025	— (Note: "Hai Yorokonde" did not enter the Circle Digital Chart but peaked at number 45 on the component Download Chart.)	Non-album singles
"Crazy Kimchi Love" (愛습파 (사랑해요 습파김치))	2025	—	Non-album singles
"—" denotes releases that did not chart.

=== Collaborations ===
Title	Year	Album
"Mariorang Norazo" (마리오랑 노라조) (with Mario)	2014	Non-album singles
"Happy, Merry, Christ, and Mas" (해피와메리와크리스와마스) (with Ninikids and Baby Shark Music Studio Nuvo)	2023	Non-album singles

=== Soundtrack appearances ===
Title	Year	Album
"Ineffective Boss Without Power" (치이고 박히고 무능상사)	2014	Ineffective Boss Without Power OST
"에라 모르겠다"	2016	Happy Home OST
"보내도 보내지 않습니다"	2016	Begin Again OST
"Our Neighbourhood Hero" (우리동네 Hero)	2019	The Fiery Priest OST
"Pegasus Market" (쌉니다 천리마마트)	2019	Pegasus Market OST
"Bong Hwan A" (봉환아)	2020	Mr. Queen OST
"Nature Man" (네이처맨)	2023	Nature Man (Naver Webtoon) OST
"Double or Nothing" (이판사판)	2023	Boyhood OST
"Be My Villains" (빌런이 되어줘)	2025	Villains Everywhere OST
