= Our Universe (South Korean TV series) =

2026 South Korean television series

- Promotional poster
- Hangul: 우주를 줄게
- Hanja: 宇宙를 즐게
- Lit.: I'll Give You the Universe
- RR: Ujureul julge
- MR: Ujurŭl chulge
- Genre: Coming-of-age; Romantic comedy
- Written by: Soo Jin; Jeon Yu-ri; Shin Yi-hyun
- Directed by: Lee Hyun-seok; Jung Yeo-jin
- Starring: Bae In-hyuk; Roh Jeong-eui; Park Seo-ham; Park Yu-ho
- Music by: Gaemi
- Country of origin: South Korea
- Original language: Korean
- No. of episodes: 12

Production
- Executive producers: Jang Kyung-ik; Yoo Sang-won; Song In-sung; Kim Ryoon-hee (CP); Kim Shin-ah
- Producers: Yoon Min-ji; Park Sol-bin
- Cinematography: Jung Seung-woo; Lee Myung-joon
- Editors: Han Ji-woo; Park Eun-mi
- Running time: 60 minutes
- Production companies: Studio Dragon; Syn&Studio

Original release
- Network: tvN
- Release: February 4 – March 12, 2026

Our Universe (Korean: 우주를 줄게) is a 2026 South Korean coming-of-age romance drama television series written by Soo Jin, and Shin Yi-hyun, directed by Lee Hyun-seok and Jung Yeo-jin, and starring Bae In-hyuk, Roh Jeong-eui, Park Seo-ham, and Park Yu-ho. The series follows two in-laws and how they raise their orphaned nephew, Woo-ju. It aired on tvN from February 4, to March 12, 2026, every Wednesday and Thursday at 22:40 (KST), marking the revival of the network's Wednesday-Thursday time slot after a three-year hiatus. It is also available for streaming on TVING in South Korea and internationally on Viki and HBO Max.

== Synopsis ==
Twenty-eight-year-olds Seon Tae-hyung and Woo Hyun-jin find their lives upended when they are forced to raise their infant nephew, Woo-ju, following the sudden death of the child's parents who were their siblings. Despite being in-laws with no prior close relationship, the two begin living together to care for the baby. As the inexperienced pair navigates the challenges of parenthood, they grow closer and begin to develop romantic feelings for one another.

== Cast and characters ==
=== Main ===
- Bae In-hyuk as Seon Tae-hyung
  - Kim Hee-seong as young Tae-hyung

A photography assistant known for his skill despite his junior status. Raised in an orphanage after being left there by his older brother, Woo-jin, he initially pursued photography as a way to connect with his past. Following a brief, strained reunion and Woo-jin's subsequent death, he becomes the guardian of his 20-month-old nephew, Woo-ju. Although he initially prefers a solitary life, he gradually takes on a parental role and develops feelings for Hyun-jin, his brother's sister-in-law.

- Roh Jeong-eui as Woo Hyun-jin
  - Choi So-yool as young Hyun-jin

A high-achieving college graduate who was raised by her older sister, Hyun-ju, following the death of their parents. Driven by a desire to become financially independent and reduce her sister's burden, she focuses strictly on securing a stable corporate job. Following the sudden death of Hyun-ju and her brother-in-law, Woo-jin, she becomes the primary guardian of her nephew, Woo-ju. Despite her lack of experience, she commits to raising him and eventually enters into a cohabitation agreement with Woo-jin's brother, Tae-hyung, to manage childcare and living expenses.

- Park Seo-ham as Park Yoon-seong

The youngest team leader at BS Food who oversees Hyun-jin's department. He was Hyun-jin's college senior and harbored unrequited feelings for her until she abruptly ended their relationship seven years prior. When they reunite as colleagues, he attempts to rekindle their connection. He becomes a rival to Tae-hyung, questioning the nature of Tae-hyung and Hyun-jin's living arrangement and their shared responsibility over Woo-ju.

- Park Yu-ho as Seon Woo-ju

Woo-jin's 20-month-old son and both Hyun-jin and Tae-hyung's nephew. Following his father's death, his care falls to his aunt and uncle. Despite his gentle appearance, his temperament presents a challenge to his inexperienced guardians. He serves as a central link between Hyun-jin and Tae-hyung, often influencing the development of their relationship.

=== Supporting ===
==== People around Seon Tae-hyung and Woo Hyun-jin ====
- Ha Jun as Seon Woo-jin (special appearance)
  - Kim Seo-joon as teen Woo-jin

Tae-hyung's older brother. He placed Tae-hyung in an orphanage as a child to protect him from their father, Gyu-tae, though he kept this motivation a secret. After reuniting with Tae-hyung years later, he struggles to explain his past actions. He dies in a car accident shortly after learning of his father's release from prison, leaving behind his son, Woo-ju.

- Park Ji-hyun as Woo Hyun-ju (special appearance)
  - Park Sharon as teen Hyun-ju

Hyun-jin's older sister and legal guardian following the death of their parents. She spent her youth supporting Hyun-jin, even delaying her marriage to ensure her sister's stability. After marrying Woo-jin and having a son, Woo-ju, she continued to provide a home for Hyun-jin. She dies in a car accident alongside her husband, leaving Hyun-jin to care for her son.

- Oh Hyun-joong as Kim Ui-jun

Tae-hyung's close friend and the owner of Milky Way Studio, a photography business specializing in infants. He met Tae-hyung in a school photography club where they bonded over their interest in film photography. As the only person aware of Tae-hyung's family background, he provides emotional support and a private space for Tae-hyung to discuss his personal difficulties.

- Oh Se-eun as Ye-eun

Hyun-jin's college classmate and close friend.

==== Yu-seong Villa ====
- Kang Ae-shim as Park Ae-ja

Hyun-jin and Tae-hyung's neighbor who lives with her son, Doo-sik. Known for her generosity and knowledge of the local residents' lives, she provides emotional support and practical childcare assistance to Hyun-jin and Tae-hyung as they adjust to raising their nephew.

- Kim In-kwon as Bae Doo-sik

Hyun-jin and Tae-hyung's neighbor and Ae-ja's son. A self-appointed supervisor of the villa's maintenance, he frequently involves himself in the affairs of other residents. Although his efforts to help often lead to complications, he is a dedicated caregiver to his mother. He frequently speculates about the nature of the relationship between Hyun-jin and Tae-hyung.

- Han Ji-hyo as Kim Ji-hyun

Hyun-jin and Tae-hyung's neighbor and a social media influencer known for her childcare and baby food expertise. As an experienced mother of three, she acts as a mentor to Hyun-jin, offering practical advice on raising Woo-ju. She also uses her influence within the local daycare community to support Hyun-jin and address neighborhood rumors.

- Lim Sung-jun as Lee Jae-min

Hyun-jin and Tae-hyung's neighbor and Ji-hyun's husband. Despite his reserved exterior, he is a family-oriented man who assists his wife in raising their three children. He works as a delivery driver and occasionally checks on Woo-ju's wellbeing while interacting with Hyun-jin and Tae-hyung.

==== Film Pluto ====
- Jin Seo-yeon as Amy Chu (Chu Ui-jeong)

A prominent and temperamental fashion photographer known for her perfectionism and artistic rigor. She traditionally handled all her professional work with only her husband, Mu-saeng, acting as her manager. Following Mu-saeng's request for a divorce, she hires Tae-hyung as her first formal assistant. Despite initial friction over his bold personality, she acknowledges his technical skill in executing her creative concepts.

- Ku Sung-hwan as Jo Mu-saeng

Amy's husband and long-time manager. For 15 years, he managed every detail of Amy's professional and personal life, adopting a specific aesthetic to meet her standards. Seeking independence, he initiates divorce proceedings and recruits Tae-hyung to replace him as Julia's assistant. Despite his desire to leave, he remains protective of Amy's reputation and experiences jealousy regarding her professional bond with Tae-hyung.

- Yun Woo as Oh Seung-taek

A junior photographer who views Tae-hyung as a mentor and role model. They became friends while working together as assistants at Oh Film. Though initially confused by Tae-hyung's decision to shift careers and take on childcare responsibilities, he continues to support him. He eventually gains a position at Film Pluto through Tae-hyung's recommendation.

==== BS Food ====
- Choi Gyu-ri as Baek Se-yeon

Hyun-jin's close friend from college and a member of the Public Relations Team at BS Food. Coming from a wealthy background, she provides a carefree contrast to Hyun-jin's pragmatic personality. She acts as a confidante for Hyun-jin, assisting her with career challenges and childcare. She frequently observes and comments on the romantic tension between Hyun-jin, Tae-hyung, and Yoon-seong.

- Kim Seong-jeong as Jo Gyu-jeong

A member of Planning Team 3 at BS Food and Yoon-sung's assistant. He prides himself on being Yoon-sung's primary supporter and relies on his social skills to navigate the competitive corporate environment. Although he initially feels threatened by Hyun-jin's competence and her rapport with Yoon-sung, he eventually provides her with occasional assistance.

- Chun Yi-seul as Kim So-hee

The senior member of Planning Team 3 at BS Food. Unlike her workaholic colleagues, she prioritizes a work-life balance and dislikes working overtime. Although she is initially annoyed by Hyun-jin's excessive enthusiasm, she eventually warms up to her as Hyun-jin's competence helps reduce the team's overall workload.

== Production ==
=== Development ===
Our Universe was selected by tvN to restart the network's Wednesday–Thursday drama programming, which had been suspended since May 2023. The series is written by Soo Jin, Jeon Yu-ri, and Shin Yi-hyun, directed by Lee Hyun-seok and Jung Yeo-jin, planned by Studio Dragon, and produced by Syn&Studio.

=== Casting ===
Bae In-hyuk and Roh Jeong-eui has been cast as both lead in the series. Park Seo-ham reportedly joined the lead cast. Bae, Roh, and Park's appearances were confirmed by August 2025. In late 2025 and early 2026, Park Ji-hyun would make a special appearance to support her labelmate Roh while Ku Sung-hwang, Choi Gyu-ri, Oh Hyun-joong, and Kim In-kwon were confirmed to play various supporting roles.

=== Music ===
The soundtrack for Our Universe is produced by Music Director Gaemi. The score focuses on capturing the "daily warmth" and the evolving romantic tension between the leads as they navigate co-parenting. The first part of the OST titled "Shine on Me" was released on February 5, 2026, featuring the band Daybreak. Part 2 was released on February 12, titled "Promenade" (어디라도 난 좋아; lit. 'I'm Fine Anywhere') and sung by Rothy and Haeun.

== Release ==
Our Universe was originally scheduled to air on tvN in 2025, its release was postponed to the first half of 2026. The first poster featuring child actor Park Yu-ho was released alongside the announcement of the February 4, 2026, premiere. The series occupies the Wednesday–Thursday time slot at 22:40 (KST). It is also available for streaming on TVING in South Korea and later acquired by Viki and HBO Max for international distribution.

== Viewership ==
According to Nielsen Korea, Our Universe premiered with nationwide ratings in the 1% range and maintained similar levels throughout its broadcast. The final episode recorded a peak rating of 2.0%.

On Rakuten Viki, the drama reached number one in viewership in 142 countries and regions, including the United States, Brazil, France, India, and the United Arab Emirates, during its first week of broadcast. It maintained a user rating of 9.7/10 on the platform. It peaked at number three in the overall drama category on Japan's U-Next and reached number one on the daily Hallyu/Asia chart. While HBO Max reported that the series maintained a presence in its viewership trends across Southeast Asian markets throughout its run.

According to tvN, the series recorded the highest average cumulative digital views for its weekday dramas during the 2025–2026 period. By the conclusion of the series on March 12, 2026, cumulative views for related video content reached approximately 500 million. An associated social media account for the character "Woo-ju", portrayed by Park Yu-ho, recorded over 60 million views.

Our Universe : South Korea viewers per episode (thousands)

| Season | Episode number | | | | | | | | | | | | Average |
| Season | 1 | 2 | 3 | 4 | 5 | 6 | 7 | 8 | 9 | 10 | 11 | 12 | Average |
|---|---|---|---|---|---|---|---|---|---|---|---|---|---|
| 1 | 439 | 357 | 451 | 411 | 322 | 360 | 478 | 382 | 445 | 406 | 379 | 461 | 408 |

Source: Audience measurement performed nationwide by Nielsen Korea.

Average TV viewership ratings
| Ep. | Original broadcast date | Average audience share (Nielsen Korea) | |
| Ep. | Original broadcast date | Nationwide | Seoul |
|---|---|---|---|
| 1 | February 4, 2026 | 1.894% (4th) | 1.771% (4th) |
| 2 | February 5, 2026 | 1.330% (5th) | 1.389% (3rd) |
| 3 | February 11, 2026 | 1.790% (4th) | 1.602% (4th) |
| 4 | February 12, 2026 | 1.536% (2nd) | 1.572% (2nd) |
| 5 | February 18, 2026 | 1.3% (13th) | N/A |
| 6 | February 19, 2026 | 1.353% (5th) | 1.169% (7th) |
| 7 | February 25, 2026 | 1.873% (2nd) | 1.861% (2nd) |
| 8 | February 26, 2026 | 1.416% (3rd) | 1.489% (2nd) |
| 9 | March 4, 2026 | 1.761% (10th) | 1.760% (6th) |
| 10 | March 5, 2026 | 1.6% (14th) | 1.739% (7th) |
| 11 | March 11, 2026 | 1.698% (7th) | 1.514% (6th) |
| 12 | March 12, 2026 | 1.953% (1st) | 2.057% (1st) |
| Average | | 1.625% | 1.630% (Note: This average rating is calculated based on the published ratings. The exact average rating is unknown due to one rating not being published.) |
In the table above, the blue numbers represent the lowest ratings and the red numbers represent the highest ratings.; N/A denotes ratings that were not published.; This series aired on a cable channel/pay TV which normally has a relatively smaller audience compared to free-to-air TV/public broadcasters (KBS, SBS, MBC, and EBS).
