= Lee Seo-hwan =

South Korean actor (born 1973)

- 이서환
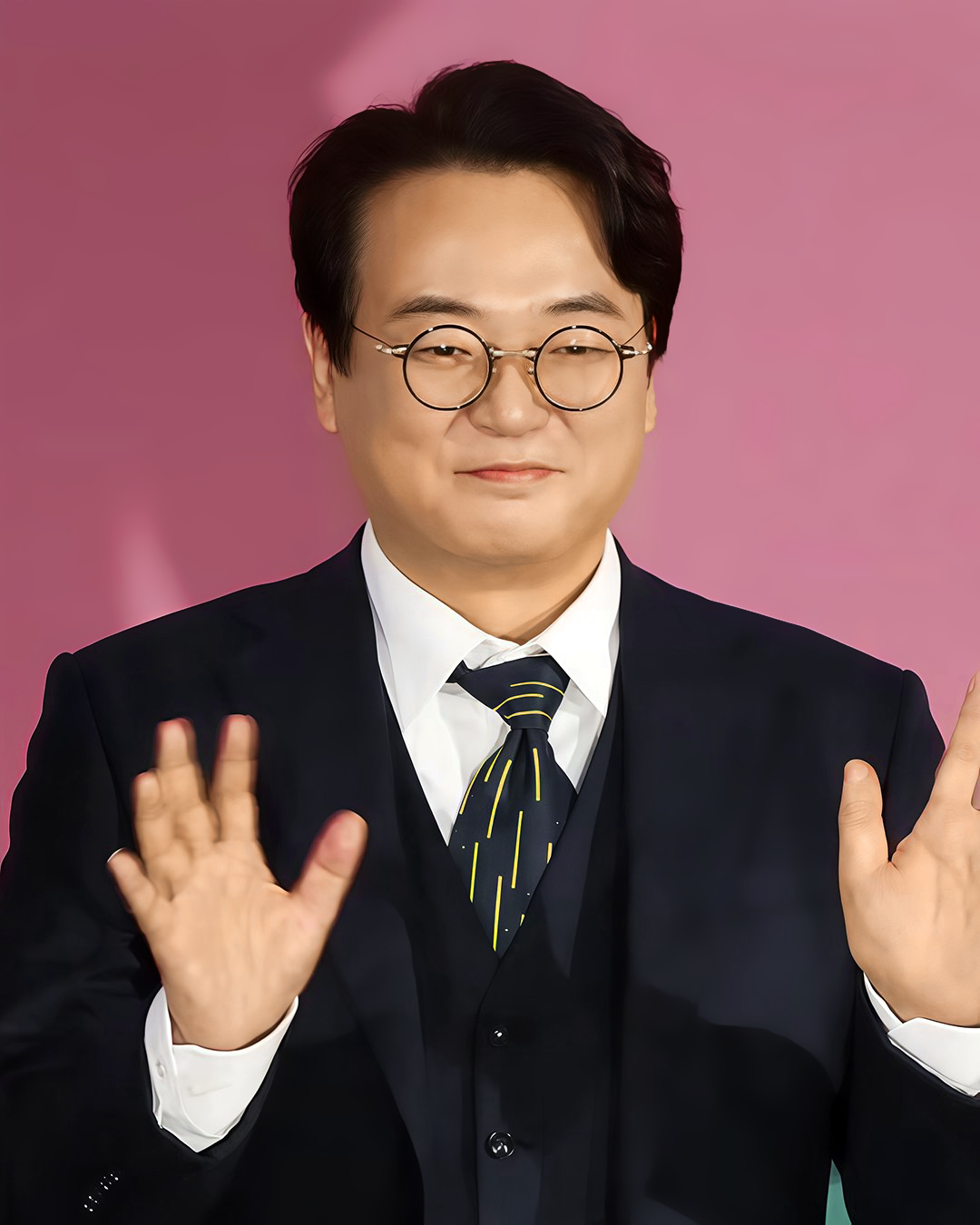
- Lee at the Squid Game 2 production press conference, December 2024
- Born: Lee Young-ki (이영기); March 6, 1973 (age 53); Nam District, Incheon, Gyeonggi Province, South Korea
- Education: Department of German Language and Literature, Incheon National University
- Occupation: Actor
- Years active: 2004; 22 years ago
- Agent: SIMSTORY
- Website: Official website

Lee Seo-hwan (Korean: 이서환, born March 6, 1973), birth name Lee Young-ki (이영기), is a South Korean actor. He graduated from the Department of German Language and Literature at Incheon National University and made his debut in 2004 with the musical The Hunchback of Notre-Dame. He gained widespread attention for his role as Park Jung-bae in the 2024 Netflix series Squid Game 2.

He was featured in international media following a press event in Taipei alongside fellow cast members Park Gyu-young, Yim Si-wan, Jo Yu-ri, and Kang Ha-neul.

== Filmography ==
=== Films ===
Year	Title	Role	Notes	Ref.
2015	Girl on the Edge	Homeroom Teacher		
2017	The Mayor	Policy staff Member for Byun Jong-gu		
2017	7th Room	Drunk Man		
2017	The Covered Road		Short film	
2018	Dear Enemy	Factory Security Officer		
2018	The Drug King	Bullfly		
2019	Mal-Mo-E: The Secret Mission	Minister Lee		
2019	The Witness	Real Estate Agent		
2019	Money	Financial Supervisory Service Officer		
2019	The Gangster, the Cop, the Devil	Man in Car		
2019	Beast	Forensics Team Member		
2019	The Gift	Factory Owner		
2019	The Divine Move: Ghost Move	Lone Ranger's Father		
2019	Car Center	Section Chief Lim		
2019	Moonlit Sky	Eunuch Jung		
2020	The Devil's Deal	Lee Young-bae		
2022	Gentleman	Sergeant Lee		
2022	Kingmaker	Public Servant in Gyeongsang Province		
2023	Switch	Director Oh		
2023	Concrete Utopia	Director Park		
2023	The Boys	Investigation Team Leader		
2024	Troll Factory	Park Woo-seong		
2024	Handsome Guys	Real Estate Agent		
2025	Yadang: The Snitch	Sergeant Kim		
2025	Big Deal	Heo Jun-seok		

=== Television series ===
Year	Title	Role	Notes	Ref.
2005	Drama City		Episode: "Shall We Dance Together?"	
2016	KBS Drama Special	Kwon Chan-su	Episode: "Midsummer Dream"	
2016	The Doctors	Record Store Owner		
2017	Tomorrow, with You	Driver		
2017	My Father Is Strange	Kim Gyu-yong		
2017	My Sassy Girl	Jewelry Store Employee		
2017	Fight for My Way	Class Advisor		
2017	Criminal Minds	Jo Seok-hwan		
2017	KBS Drama Special		Episode: "Bald Romance"	
2017	Suspicious Partner	Prison Guard		
2018	The Crowned Clown	Royal Chef		
2018	Sketch	Jacket Man		
2019	Romance Is a Bonus Book	Song Hae-rin's Father		
2019	Babel			
2019	Special Labor Inspector			
2019	Voice 3			
2019	Beautiful World	Jung Man-seop		
2019	Justice	Guk Jin-tae		
2019	All of Us Are Dead	Choi Ji-deok	Season 1	
2020	Kingdom Season 2			
2020	Extraordinary You	Jo Cheol-nam		
2020	Memorials	Heo Deok-gu		
2020	KBS Drama Special	Boss	Episode: "Traces of Love"	
2021	The Devil Judge	Park Do-man		
2021	Lost	Jang Gyu		
2021	Sell Your Haunted House	Client of Oh In-beom		
2021	Lovers of the Red Sky	Minister of Rites		
2021–2023	Squid Game	Park Jung-bae	Season 1–2	
2022	Love to Hate You	Kim Si-peong		
2022	Pachinko	Kinoshita		
2022	O'PENing	Wang Jang-gyu	Episode: "Find the 1st Prize"	
2022	Poong, the Joseon Psychiatrist	Shin Kwi-su		
2022	Fly High Butterfly	Kang Tae-won		
2022	Extraordinary Attorney Woo	Jin-ik		
2023	Park Ha-kyung's Travelogue	Merchant at Sokcho Station		
2023	It's Okay to Not Be Okay	Brother of Kim Sung-sik		
2023	Bad and Crazy	Kwon Chang-hyun		
2024	Goodbye Earth	Yoon Sung-shik		
2024	Good Partner	Judge	Season 1	
2024	Gangnam B-Side	Lee Han-pyung		
2024	KBS Drama Special	Park Gwang-bae	Episode: "Finding Handsome"	
2024	The Lady in Dignity	Kim Nak-su		
2024	The Tale of Lady Ok	Kim Nak-soo		
2025	Undercover High School	Kim Hyeong-bae		
2025	Law and the City	Seong Yu-deok		
2026	Cabbage Your Life	Im Joo-hyung		
2026	Happy Anding	Jeong Man-sik		
2026	Kidnap Game	Park Dong-guk		

== Theater works ==
=== Musicals ===
Year	Title	Role	Notes/Ref.
2004	The Hunchback of Notre Dame (musical)		
2005	Never Ending Story		Writer
2006	Jekyll & Hyde (musical)	Bishop	
2006	Hwang Jin-yi		
2006	Ladies and Gentlemen		
2007	The Last Empress (musical)		
2008	Laundry (musical)	Baker	
2009	Laundry	Bookstore Owner	
2010	Man of La Mancha (musical)	Priest	
2010	Laundry	Baker	
2011	Fame (musical)	Mr. Miles	
2012	Last Wish	Doctor	
2012	Man of La Mancha	Priest	
2013	Fly, Mr. Park!	Representative	
2013	Glorious Holiday		
2013	Man of La Mancha	Priest	
2014	Love Letter	Grandpa	
2014	Laundry	Baker	
2015	The Cigarette Store Girl	Jung Man-seok	
2015	Laundry	Baker	
2016	Along With the Gods	Priest Rice	
2016	That Summer, The Zoo	Ensemble	
2016	Laundry	Baker	
2016	The Cigarette Store Girl	Jung Man-seok	
2017	The Life and Death of Haruko Matsuko	Manager Akagi / Father	
2017	Rock Theater	Oh Beom-ha	
2019	Blue Rain (musical)		

=== Plays ===
Year	Title	Role	Notes/Ref.
2011	Open Your Eyes		
2013	Odong-ri Fire Station		Writer
2014	Mangwon-dong Brothers	Supermarket Grandpa	Writer
2016	Jangsoo Market	Ensemble	
2018	Jangsoo Market	Ensemble	
