= Bae Geu-rin =

South Korean actress (born 1989)

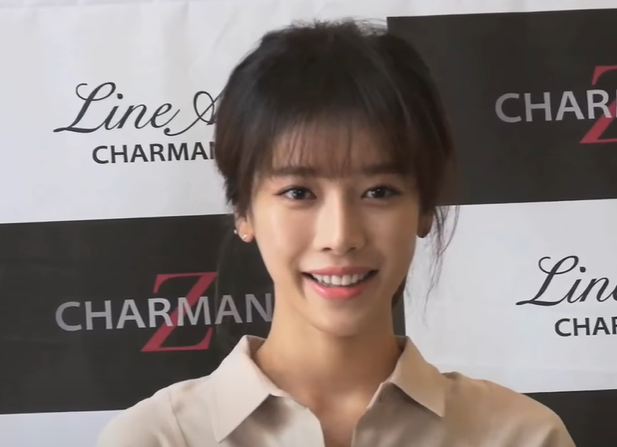
- Bae in April 2015
- Born: January 1, 1989 (age 37); Daegu, South Korea
- Other name: Bae Green
- Occupation: Actress
- Years active: 2006–present
- Agent: 4Doors Entertainment

Korean name
- Hangul: 배그린
- RR: Bae Geurin
- MR: Pae Kŭrin

Bae Geu-rin (Korean: 배그린; born January 1, 1989) is a South Korean actress.

== Filmography ==
=== Film ===
Year	Title	Role	Ref.
2015	The Black Hand	Yoo-mi	
2023	Mount CHIAK	Soo-ah	

=== Television series ===
Year	Title	Role	Notes/Ref.
2006	Sharp 3	Bae Geu-rin	
2008	Lawyers of the Great Republic of Korea		
2008	My Lady Boss, My Hero	Han Eun-seon	
2009	Friend, Our Legend	Park Sung-ae	
2009	You're Beautiful	Sa Yu-ri	
2010	Once Upon a Time in Saengchori	Park Bok-soon/Victoria	
2010	Smile, Mom	Baek Jang-mi	(guest)
2011	49 Days	Park Seo-woo	
2012	12 Signs of Love	Oh Hae-ra	
2013	You Are the Best!	Shin Yi-jung	
2013	Hold My Hand	Oh Shin-hee	
2016	Flowers of the Prison	Ga-bi	
2021–2022	Uncle	Kim Young-ah	
2022	It's Beautiful Now	So Young-eun	Cameo
2022–2023	Vengeance of the Bride	Hong Jo-yi	
2023	Numbers	Jung Si-young	
2024	Marry My Husband	Ha Ye-ji	Supporting Role
2025	Genie, Make a wish	Wahid	Supporting Role

=== Music video appearances ===
Year	Song title	Artist
2009	"What Is Love?"	Miss S
