= Teen Teen =

South Korean boy band

- Also known as: 틴틴
- Origin: Seoul, South Korea
- Genre: K-pop
- Years active: 2019–2021
- Label: Maroo
- Member of: Ghost9
- Past members: Lee Jin-woo; Lee Tae-seung; Lee Woo-jin
- Website: maroocorp.co.kr/artist_view.php?pk=6

Teen Teen (틴틴) was a South Korean boy band formed by Maroo Entertainment in 2019. The group debuted on September 18, 2019, with Very, On Top.

The unit effectively disbanded following Taeseung's departure from GHOST9.

== Pre-debut ==
Before debut, all members participated in Produce X 101 representing Maroo Entertainment, Lee Jin-woo finished in 22nd place, Lee Woo-jin in 41st and Lee Tae-seung in 53rd.

== Members ==
- Lee Jin-woo (이진우)
- Lee Tae-seung (이태승)
- Lee Woo-jin (이우진)

== Discography ==
=== Extended plays ===
Title	Album details	Peak chart positions	Sales
Title	Album details	KOR	Sales
Very, On Top	Released: September 18, 2019; Label: Maroo Entertainment, NHN Bugs; Formats: CD, digital download, streaming	6	KOR: 15,870
