= Lee Jin-woo (singer) =

South Korean singer and actor (born 2004)

- Lee in March 2026
- Born: September 13, 2004 (age 22); South Korea
- Education: Dongguk University (Department of Theater)
- Occupations: Singer; actor
- Years active: 2019–present
- Musical career
- Genre: K-pop
- Instrument: Vocals
- Label: Maroo Entertainment
- Member of: Ghost9
- Formerly of: Teen Teen

Korean name
- Hangul: 이진우
- RR: I Jinu
- MR: I Chinu

Lee Jin-woo (Korean: 이진우; pronounced [i.tɕi.nu]; born September 13, 2004) is a South Korean singer and actor under Maroo Entertainment. He was a contestant on the survival reality show Produce X 101 (2019) before debuting as a member of the boy group Teen Teen and later the boy band Ghost9 in September 2020. He made his acting debut in the 2023 web series Snap and Spark, and is best known for his lead roles in Namib (2024–2025), Where's My Hero? (2025), and Cabbage Your Life (2026).

== Early life and education ==
Lee Jin-woo was born on September 13, 2004. He grew up in Haenam County, South Jeolla Province, where his family has long been engaged in cabbage farming. At the age of twelve, his mother sent him to continue his education in Gwangju, where his aunt lived. His mother encouraged him to aim for the big leagues, warning that if he stayed in Haenam he would likely become a farmer. During his first year at middle school, Lee determined to pursue a career in entertainment after seeing professional idol performances on television, prompting him to formally enroll in a local dance academy. He subsequently relocated to Seoul independently to audition for entertainment agencies, eventually earning a trainee position under Maroo Entertainment. Lee completed his secondary education at Hanlim Multi Art School, graduating in February 2023. In January 2024, he was admitted into the Department of Theater at Dongguk University.

== Career ==
=== 2019–2020: Produce X 101, Teen Teen, and Ghost9 ===
Lee began his career in the entertainment industry as a trainee under Maroo Entertainment. From May to July 2019, he represented the agency as a contestant on Mnet's reality survival audition program Produce X 101. During his participation, he gained popularity and earned the affectionate nickname "Haenami" (해남이) because his hometown is Haenam County, South Jeolla Province. He was eliminated from the show in the 11th episode, finishing the competition at rank 22.

Following the live finale of Mnet's Produce X 101 in July 2019, widespread public allegations emerged regarding calculation inconsistencies in the final viewer votes. The controversy escalated into a formal criminal investigation that targeted the production team for intentionally rigging the ranking metrics to favor certain contestants. The high court's official records explicitly verified that Lee Jin-woo was one of the primary victims of the fabrication, confirming that he had been unjustly eliminated prior to the final episode during the program's third round of voting.

On September 3, 2019, it was announced that Lee would officially debut as a member of the three-member project unit Teen Teen. He officially debuted with the group on September 18, 2019, through the release of their first mini-album Very, On Top.

Following this unit project, Lee re-debuted as a member of the boy group Ghost9 on September 23, 2020, with the release of the extended play (EP) Pre Episode 1: Door.

=== 2023–present: Transition to acting ===
Lee made his acting debut on December 15, 2023, in the high school romance web series Snap and Spark, broadcast on the YouTube channel KokTV. He plays Seon Joo-hyeok, an idol trainee with a secret unrequited crush.

Lee Jin-woo at the press conference for Namib in December 2024, prior to its premiere

In early 2024, Lee led the web drama Caffeine Romance with Wooyeon. He plays Lee Won-du, a member of the popular boy group Crema, who is the female lead's long-time fan. Released on Ediya Coffee’s official YouTube channel, the web drama surpassed 1 million views. In late 2024, Lee made his mainstream television drama debut in the Genie TV original drama series Namib, which premiered on ENA in December 2024. The drama is described as his "debut in a serious drama". He plays Shim Jin-woo, the only son in his family who becomes hearing-impaired after an accident. In preparation for the role, he researched materials on people with hearing impairments prior to filming.

In 2025, Lee starred in the Wavve youth mystery-romance web series Where's My Hero?, based on the Naver webtoon of the same name. He portrayed the main role of Seon Woo-yeon, a popular university student caught in a central love triangle alongside characters played by Gal So-won and Cha Jun-ho.

In March 2026, Lee landed his first major network television leading role in the KBS2 mini-series Cabbage Your Life. He starred as Seong Ji-cheon, an elite medical school student who entered with a perfect CSAT score but navigates his personal dreams and growth within the rural area of Yeonri-ri. In June 2026, he appeared in the Netflix psychological thriller series Notes from the Last Row as Kim Se-yun, a wealthy university freshman who is friends with the main character.

== Filmography ==
=== Television series ===
Year	Title	Role	Notes	Ref.
2024	Social Savvy Class 101		Special appearance (Ep. 8)	
2024–2025	Namib	Shim Jin-woo		
2025	Crushology 101	High school art teacher	Special appearance (Ep. 1)	
2026	Cabbage Your Life	Seong Ji-cheon		
2026	Notes from the Last Row	Kim Se-yun		

=== Web series ===
Year	Title	Role	Notes	Ref.
2023	Snap and Spark	Seon Joo-hyeok	Acting debut	
2024	Caffeine Romance	Lee Won-du		
2025	Where's My Hero?	Seon Woo-yeon		

Lee Jin-woo in 2021

=== Television show ===
Year	Title	Role	Notes	Ref.
2019	Produce X 101	Contestant	Finished in 22nd place	
2023	Peak Time	Contestant	Representing Team 14:00 (Ghost9)	
2024	Crime Scene Returns	Detective Assistant		
