= Ghost9 =

South Korean boy band

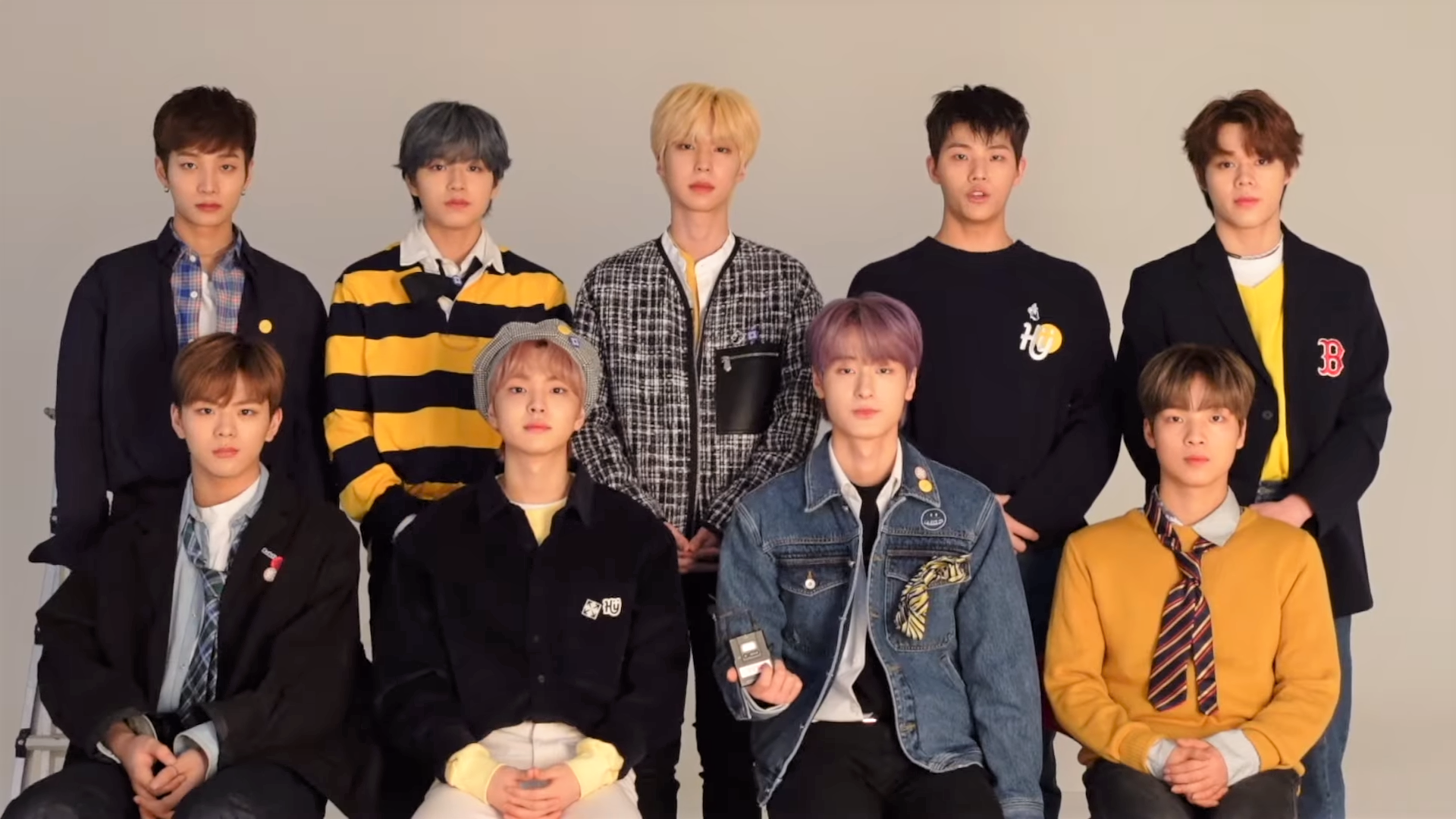
- Ghost9 in March 2021

Background information
- Origin: Seoul, South Korea
- Genre: K-pop
- Years active: 2020–present
- Label: Maroo
- Members: Shin; Son Jun-hyung; Choi Jun-seong; Lee Kang Sung; Prince Vatani; Lee Woo-jin; Lee Jin-woo
- Past members: Hwang Dong-jun; Lee Tae-seung

Ghost9 (Korean: 고스트나인; stylized in all caps) is a South Korean boy band formed by Maroo Entertainment in 2020, the group currently consists of seven members: Shin, Son Jun-hyung, Choi Jun-seong, Lee Kang-sung, Prince Vatani, Lee Woo-jin and Lee Jin-woo. Hwang Dong-jun and Lee Taeseung left the group on September 5, 2021, They made their debut on September 23, 2020, with their debut EP Pre Episode 1: Door.

== History ==
=== Pre-debut ===
Before debut, Choi Jun-seong, Lee Tae-seung, Lee Woo-jin, and Lee Jin-woo participated in Produce X 101. Lee Jin-woo finished in 22nd place, Lee Woo-jin in 41st, Choi Jun-seong in 46th, and Lee Tae-seung in 53rd. Lee Tae-seung, Lee Woo-jin, and Lee Jin-woo also made their debut as members of Teen Teen. Hwang Dong-jun and Son Jun-hyung participated in Mix Nine, only the latter passed the audition.

=== 2020: Debut with Pre Episode 1: Door, Pre Episode 2: W.all ===
Ghost9 debuted with their debut EP Pre Episode 1: Door on September 23, 2020, with the lead single "Think of Dawn".

On November 25, 2020, Maroo announced the group's second mini album, Pre Episode 2: W.all on December 10, with the lead single "W.all".

=== 2021: Now : Where We Are, Here & Now : When We Are In Love, members departure, Now : Who We Are Facing ===
On February 17, Maroo Entertainment announced GHOST9 would make a comeback on March 11, with the release of their third mini album, Now: Where We Are, Here on March 11, with the lead single "Seoul".

On May 12, Maroo announced that the group would make a comeback on June 3, with their fourth mini album, Now: When We Are in Love on June 3, with the lead single "Up All Night".

On September 5, it was announced that members Hwang Dong-jun and Lee Tae-seung would be departing from Ghost9 and the group will continue as seven without the addition of new members.

On November 9, Maroo announced that the group would make their first comeback as seven on November 25, with their fifth mini album, Who We Are Facing on November 25, with the lead single "Control".

=== 2022: US Tour and Arcade: V ===
On January 15, 2022, they held the first concert of their tour GHOST9 [Into The Now] Meet&Live Tour in US in Los Angeles. On January 18, they then performed a free busking show in Venice Beach, Calif. The next day, they held a fansign event in San Francisco, at the local Kpop store SarangHello. They then held their second concert on January 20 in San Francisco.

=== 2023–present: Peak Time and recent activities ===
The group became participants in the program Peak Time.

Ghost9 released their sixth EP Arcade: V on April 7, with the lead single "X-Ray".

== Members ==
=== Current ===
- Son Jun-hyung (손준형)
- Lee Shin (이신)
- Lee Kang-sung (이강성)
- Choi Jun-seong (최준성)
- Prince Vatani (프린스)
- Lee Woo-jin (이우진)
- Lee Jin-woo (이진우)

=== Former ===
- Hwang Dong-jun (황동준)
- Lee Tae-seung (이태승)

== Discography ==
=== Extended plays ===
| Title | EP details | Peak chart positions | Sales |
| Title | EP details | KOR | Sales |
|---|---|---|---|
| Pre Episode 1: Door | Released: September 23, 2020; Labels: Maroo, NHN Bugs; Formats: CD, digital download, streaming; Track listing: 1. "Vision (Intro)"; 2. "Think of Dawn"; 3. "Reborn"; 4. "It's Gonna Be Hot"; 5. "Lay Back"; 6. "Flying at Night" (야간비행) | 14 | KOR: 11,923 |
| Pre Episode 2: W.all | Released: December 10, 2020; Labels: Maroo, NHN Bugs; Formats: CD, digital download, streaming; Track listing: 1. "Peace (Intro)"; 2. "Splash" (큰물에서 놀아); 3. "W.all"; 4. "Red Sign"; 5. "Focus" (한 글자도 놓치지 마); 6. "Way to You" (꿈길) | 12 | KOR: 8,797 |
| Now: Where We Are, Here | Released: March 11, 2021; Labels: Maroo Entertainment, NHN Bugs; Formats: CD, digital download, streaming; Track listing: 1. "Trigger (Intro)"; 2. "Seoul"; 3. "Uno"; 4. "Starvoy"; 5. "Hide & Seek"; 6. "Monday to Sunday" | 12 | KOR: 7,774 |
| Now: When We Are in Love | Released: June 3, 2021; Labels: Maroo, NHN Bugs; Formats: CD, digital download, streaming; Track listing: 1. "On and On (Intro)"; 2. "Up All Night" (밤샜다); 3. "Double Click"; 4. "Trampoline"; 5. "Runaway"; 6. "Antenna" | 15 | KOR: 11,040 |
| Now: Who We Are Facing | Released: November 25, 2021; Labels: Maroo, NHN Bugs; Formats: CD, digital download, streaming; Track listing: 1. "Milestone (Intro)"; 2. "Control"; 3. "Triangle"; 4. "Love Language"; 5. "Dreaming"; 6. "Cosmos" | 23 | KOR: 11,810 |
| Arcade: V | Released: April 7, 2022; Labels: Maroo, NHN Bugs; Formats: CD, digital download, streaming; Track listing: 1. "Dot" (닻); 2. "X-Ray"; 3. "Champion"; 4. "T.Y.T (Take You There)"; 5. "Always, All Ways"; 6. "Stranger" | 18 | KOR: 18,658 |
| Arcade: O | Released: October 25, 2023; Labels: Maroo, NHN Bugs; Formats: CD, digital download, streaming | 17 | KOR: 14,784 |

=== Single albums ===
List of single albums, showing selected details, chart positions, and sales figures
| Title | Details | Peak chart positions | Sales |
| Title | Details | KOR | Sales |
|---|---|---|---|
| Awesome Day | Released: June 6, 2024; Labels: Maroo, NHN Bugs; Formats: Digital download, streaming | TBA | |

=== Singles ===
| Title | Year | Peak position | Album |
| Title | Year | KOR | Album |
|---|---|---|---|
| "Think of Dawn" | 2020 | — | Pre Episode 1: Door |
| "W.all" | 2020 | — | Pre Episode 2: W.all |
| "Seoul" | 2021 | — | Now: Where We Are, Here |
| "Up All Night" (밤샜다) | 2021 | — | Now: Where We Are in Love |
| "Control" | 2021 | — | Now: Who We Are Facing |
| "X-Ray" | 2022 | — | Arcade: V |
| "Ruckus" | 2023 | — | Arcade: O |
| "Awesome Day" | 2024 | — | Non-album singles |
| "Down For You" | 2024 | — | Non-album singles |
| "Moonlight" | 2026 | — | Non-album singles |
"—" denotes releases that did not chart or were not released in that region.

=== Music videos ===
| Year | Title | Director |
|---|---|---|
| "Think of Dawn" | 2020 | Zanybros |
| "W.all" | 2020 | Zanybros |
| "Seoul" | 2021 | Zanybros |
| "Up All Night" | 2021 | Zanybros |
| "Control" | 2021 | Zanybros |
| "X-Ray" | 2022 | Zanybros |
| "Ruckus" | 2023 | Zanybros |

== Awards and nominations ==
Name of the award ceremony, year presented, category, nominee of the award, and the result of the nomination
| Award ceremony | Year | Category | Nominee / Work | Result | Ref. |
|---|---|---|---|---|---|
| Asia Artist Awards | 2021 | Male Idol Group Popularity Award | Ghost9 | Nominated | |
| Asia Artist Awards | 2021 | Potential Award | Ghost9 | Won | |
| Asia Model Festival | 2023 | Popularity Award in Singer | Ghost9 | Won | |
| Golden Disc Awards | 2020 | Rookie Artist of the Year | Ghost9 | Nominated | |
| Golden Disc Awards | 2020 | Popularity Award | Ghost9 | Nominated | |
| Mnet Asian Music Awards | 2020 | Best New Male Group | Ghost9 | Nominated | |
| Seoul Music Awards | 2020 | Rookie of the Year | Ghost9 | Nominated | |
| Seoul Music Awards | 2020 | K-wave Popularity Award | Ghost9 | Nominated | |
| Seoul Music Awards | 2020 | Popularity Award | Ghost9 | Nominated | |
