= Namib (TV series) =

2024–2025 South Korean television series

- Promotional poster
- Hangul: 나미브
- RR: Namibeu
- MR: Namibŭ
- Genre: Slice of life; Workplace
- Written by: Eom Sung-min
- Directed by: Han Sang-jae; Kang Min-gu
- Starring: Go Hyun-jung; Ryeoun; Yoon Sang-hyun; Lee Jin-woo
- Music by: Kim Joon-seok; Jeong Se-rin
- Country of origin: South Korea
- Original language: Korean
- No. of episodes: 12

Production
- Running time: 60 minutes
- Production companies: SLL; Studio Wooyoungsoo

Original release
- Network: ENA; Genie TV
- Release: December 23, 2024 – January 28, 2025

Namib (Korean: 나미브) is a 2024–2025 South Korean slice of life workplace television series written by Eom Sung-min, co-directed by Han Sang-jae and Kang Min-gu, and starring Go Hyun-jung, Ryeoun, Yoon Sang-hyun, and Lee Jin-woo. The series depicts a star creation project between a fired star producer and a male trainee. It aired on ENA from December 23, 2024, to January 28, 2025, every Monday and Tuesday at 22:00 (KST), and subsequently streaming on Genie TV. It is also available for streaming on Viu and Viki in selected regions.

== Synopsis ==
Kang Soo-hyun, a star producer who trains idols gets fired from her position as co-CEO of Pandora Entertainment. She then approaches a long-term male trainee named Yu Jin-woo with malicious intentions, but gradually shows sincerity and helps him achieve his dream.

== Cast and characters ==
=== Main ===
- Go Hyun-jung as Kang Soo-hyun

A star producer who raises idols with her own philosophy and intuition but was fired from her position as co-CEO of Pandora Entertainment. Even after being kicked out of the company for some reason, she struggles to take responsibility for her disabled son.

- Ryeoun as Yu Jin-woo

A long-term trainee at Soo-hyun's company. He is a 10-year trainee with all sorts of flaws, from his mother's debt to his personal problems. Just when he was about to give up his dream, drifting like the waves, he starts training again, following Soo-hyun's advice who says she will make him a star.

- Yoon Sang-hyun as Shim Jun-seok

A former music producer who quit his job after his son was injured and became a full-time house husband. He gradually develops a desire to return to work due to his wife's stubbornness and becomes Yu Jin-woo's producer.

- Lee Jin-woo as Shim Jin-woo

Soo-hyun and Jun-seok's only son who lost his hearing in a car accident when he was young and is the main worry of his parents, but he actually tolerates bullying at school.

=== Supporting ===
- Lee Ki-taek as Chris

A talented agency trainee but ends up working as the manager of an entertainment establishment after being released.

- Kim Hyun-sook as Hong Jung-hwa

Soo-hyun's close friend and the first singer produced by Soo-hyun and Jun-seok. She rose to stardom as soon as she debuted, but is now retired and runs an Italian restaurant. She helps Soo-hyun as Jin-woo's vocal trainer.

- Choi Yu-ju as Kyung Ha-na

A singer trainee in her late 20s, which is not young for a trainee, but she is confident in herself and challenges her dream of becoming a singer.

== Production ==
=== Development ===
In February 2024, it was reported that director Jung Da-won, who directed Miss & Mrs. Cops (2019) and writer Eom Sung-min, who penned Default (2018), would work together while SLL and Studio Wooyoungsoo co-managed the production for the series. On April 29, the Genie TV original lineup was revealed at the 2024 KT Group Media Day held at the Novotel Ambassador in Dongdaemun District, Seoul and that the series title was tentatively changed to Starry Night (Korean: 별이 빛나는 밤; RR: Byeori binnaneun bam) and would be airing on ENA's Monday–Tuesday timeslot. PD Han Sang-jae, who directed Ugly Miss Young-ae seasons 8–17 (2011–2019) and Cold Blooded Intern (2023), replaced Jung to helm the series. On November 7, it was also revealed that director Kang Min-gu would also direct. At the press conference on December 16, director Kang told the media that there were several working titles for the series during the planning stage but eventually chose "Namib" as the meaning of it was beautiful and well fit the character.

=== Casting ===
On February 19, 2024, Go Hyun-jung was reportedly cast to star on the series and currently reviewing it at that time. The next day, it was reported that Ryeoun is positively considering to appear in the drama. On February 22, Song Sae-byeok was reportedly cast for the series. On August 8, Go and Ryeoun along with Yoon Sang-hyun, who replaced Song, and Lee Jin-woo has officially confirmed their appearances.

=== Filming ===
Principal photography took place for five months between July and December 2024.

== Release ==
Namib was scheduled to premiere on Genie TV, Genie TV Mobile, and ENA in the second half of 2024, and would also be available to stream on Viki in 190 countries. In November 2024, it was confirmed that the series would air on December 23, every Monday and Tuesday at 22:00 (KST).

== Viewership ==
Namib : South Korea viewers per episode (thousands)

Season	Episode number												Average
Season	1	2	3	4	5	6	7	8	9	10	11	12	Average
1	314	402	451	443	518	550	516	509	518	497	468	N/A	472

Source: Audience measurement performed nationwide by Nielsen Korea. (Note: The average viewership numbers is calculated based on the published viewership numbers. The exact average viewership numbers is unknown due to multiple unpublished viewership numbers.)

Average TV viewership ratings
Ep.	Original broadcast date	Average audience share (Nielsen Korea)	
Ep.	Original broadcast date	Nationwide	Seoul
1	December 23, 2024	1.416% (7th)	1.607% (2nd)
2	December 24, 2024	1.637% (4th)	1.645% (4th)
3	December 30, 2024	2.168% (2nd)	2.013% (2nd)
4	December 31, 2024	2.131% (2nd)	2.317% (2nd)
5	January 6, 2025	2.269% (2nd)	2.507% (2nd)
6	January 7, 2025	2.373% (3rd)	2.769% (3rd)
7	January 13, 2025	2.266% (2nd)	2.639% (2nd)
8	January 14, 2025	2.237% (2nd)	2.324% (3rd)
9	January 20, 2025	2.410% (2nd)	2.537% (2nd)
10	January 21, 2025	2.292% (2nd)	2.453% (3rd)
11	January 27, 2025	2.0% (12th)	1.915% (9th)
12	January 28, 2025	2.0% (15th)	N/A
Average		2.100%	2.248% (Note: This average rating is calculated based on the published ratings. The exact average rating is unknown due to multiple ratings not being published.)
In the table above, the blue numbers represent the lowest ratings and the red numbers represent the highest ratings.; This drama aired on a cable channel/pay TV which normally has a relatively smaller audience compared to free-to-air TV/public broadcasters (KBS, SBS, MBC, and EBS).
