= MyB =

South Korean girl group

- Origin: Seoul, South Korea
- Genres: K-pop; Dance-pop
- Years active: 2015–2016
- Labels: Maroo Entertainment
- Past members: Jookyung; Heejoo; U-Jung; Moonhee; G-won; Hayoon

MyB (Korean: 마이비) was a South Korean girl group formed by Maroo Entertainment. The group debuted on August 25, 2015 with My Oh My and made a comeback on November 13, 2015 with Ddoddo, before the group officially disbanded on December 16, 2016, where Moonhee and Hayoon would re-debut with Maroo Entertainment's new girl group, BONUSBaby in January 2017.

== Members ==
- Jookyung (주경)
- Heejoo (희주)
- U-Jung (유정)
- Moonhee (문희)
- G-won (지원)
- Hayoon (하윤)

== Discography ==
=== Single albums ===
Title	Album details	Peak chart positions	Sales
Title	Album details	KOR	Sales
My Oh My (심장어택)	Released: August 25, 2015; Label: Maroo Entertainment; Formats: CD, digital download	26	KOR: 422
Ddoddo (또또)	Released: November 13, 2015; Label: Maroo Entertainment; Formats: CD, digital download	22	KOR: 635
