= Sancheong County =

Coordinates: 35°24′57″N 127°52′24″E

Sancheong
- County
- Panoramic view of Sancheong

- Flag Emblem of Sancheong

- Location in South Korea
- Country: South Korea
- Region: Yeongnam
- Administrative divisions: 1 eup, 10 myeon

Area
  - Total: 794.59 km^{2} (306.79 sq mi)

Population (September 2024)
  - Total: 33,373
  - Density: 50.2/km^{2} (130/sq mi)
  - Dialect: Gyeongsang

Korean name
- Hangul: 산청군
- Hanja: 山淸郡
- RR: Sancheong-gun
- MR: Sanch'ŏng-gun

Sancheong County (Korean: 산청군) is a county in South Gyeongsang Province, South Korea.

== History ==
Sancheong-gun (1899)

After the unification of Silla, the Danseong region was known as Jipumcheon prefecture (知品川縣), and the modern day Dangye region was known as Jeokchon prefecture (赤村縣), and Danseong region was known as Gwolji county (闕支郡). In 757, these counties and prefectures underwent a name change as Gwolji county became Gwolseong (闕城), Jipumcheon prefecture became Saneum (山陰) and Jeokchon became Daneup (丹邑) and Saneum and Daneup became a prefecture under the subdivision of Gwolseong county. During the Goryeo period Gwolseong county was demoted to Kangseong prefecture (江城縣) which was later promoted to Kangseong County, and the Daneup became Dangye prefecture. In 1018, Dangye and Saneum became part of Hapju (陜州, which later became Hapcheon County), and Kangseong county became the administration of Jinjumok (晉州牧, Mok located in Jinju. Mok was a subdivision based on major cities that would administer dependent towns.). In 1390, Dangye returned to the control of Kangseong county and low level officers called Gammu (監務) was stationed in Saneum and Kangseong. In 1399, Myeongjin prefecture (溟珍縣) moved to be under administration of Kangseong prefecture because of Japanese pirates, and the two prefectures merged to become Danseong prefecture (丹城縣). After the Japanese invasion of Korea in the 16th century, Danseong prefecture was abolished in 1599 with part of it given to Saneum, but it was restored in 1613.In 1767, Saneum became Sancheong prefecture (山靑縣). In 1895, Sancheong and Danseong became counties. In 1906 some part of regions that was part of Jinju was incorporated into Sancheong, and Danseong was fully incorporated to Sancheong in 1914.

== Climate ==
Climate data for Sancheong (1991–2020 normals, extremes 1972–present)
Month	Jan	Feb	Mar	Apr	May	Jun	Jul	Aug	Sep	Oct	Nov	Dec	Year
Record high °C (°F)	16.9 (62.4)	24.4 (75.9)	26.2 (79.2)	31.5 (88.7)	36.4 (97.5)	35.1 (95.2)	39.3 (102.7)	38.8 (101.8)	34.5 (94.1)	30.0 (86.0)	26.5 (79.7)	21.0 (69.8)	39.3 (102.7)
Mean daily maximum °C (°F)	6.1 (43.0)	8.9 (48.0)	13.7 (56.7)	19.8 (67.6)	24.7 (76.5)	27.5 (81.5)	29.5 (85.1)	30.2 (86.4)	26.5 (79.7)	21.7 (71.1)	15.0 (59.0)	8.3 (46.9)	19.3 (66.7)
Daily mean °C (°F)	0.4 (32.7)	2.4 (36.3)	6.9 (44.4)	12.8 (55.0)	17.8 (64.0)	21.6 (70.9)	24.7 (76.5)	25.1 (77.2)	20.3 (68.5)	14.1 (57.4)	7.9 (46.2)	2.1 (35.8)	13.0 (55.4)
Mean daily minimum °C (°F)	−4.4 (24.1)	−3.2 (26.2)	0.8 (33.4)	6.1 (43.0)	11.3 (52.3)	16.7 (62.1)	21.1 (70.0)	21.4 (70.5)	15.9 (60.6)	8.5 (47.3)	2.3 (36.1)	−2.9 (26.8)	7.8 (46.0)
Record low °C (°F)	−14.6 (5.7)	−13.7 (7.3)	−9.5 (14.9)	−4.7 (23.5)	1.6 (34.9)	8.3 (46.9)	12.7 (54.9)	9.5 (49.1)	5.0 (41.0)	−2.4 (27.7)	−9.1 (15.6)	−12.6 (9.3)	−14.6 (5.7)
Average precipitation mm (inches)	24.4 (0.96)	40.9 (1.61)	66.8 (2.63)	106.5 (4.19)	105.5 (4.15)	172.4 (6.79)	328.5 (12.93)	362.3 (14.26)	207.2 (8.16)	74.2 (2.92)	43.6 (1.72)	23.9 (0.94)	1,556.2 (61.27)
Average precipitation days (≥ 0.1 mm)	4.6	5.0	7.3	8.6	8.7	9.9	14.4	14.5	9.2	5.0	6.2	4.6	98
Average snowy days	5.2	4.2	2.0	0.1	0.0	0.0	0.0	0.0	0.0	0.0	0.9	3.4	15.8
Average relative humidity (%)	55.5	54.1	55.5	56.7	62.0	70.7	78.0	78.0	75.8	69.9	64.7	58.3	64.9
Mean monthly sunshine hours	170.4	183.0	212.1	220.2	233.5	185.2	160.1	166.0	162.4	185.9	162.1	158.1	2,199
Percentage possible sunshine	55.4	58.0	56.0	57.1	53.3	43.6	38.7	42.2	45.4	56.3	52.8	52.9	50.4
Source: Korea Meteorological Administration (snow and percent sunshine 1981–2010)

== Culture ==
The region historically cultivated Cannabis sativa(known as Sam), and is known to have a tradition of weaving cloth out of cannabis by women called Duresamnori(두레삼놀이).The plant was also used as a roof for houses.

== Tourist spot ==
- Nine Scenic Views of Sancheong (산청구경)
  - Jirisan Mountain Cheonwangbong Peak (지리산 천왕봉)
  - Daewonsa Valley (대원사 계곡)
  - Royal Azaleas of Hwangmaesan Mountain (황매산 철쭉)
  - Royal Tomb of King Guhyeong (구형왕릉)
  - Gyeonghogang River Scenic View (경호강 비경)
  - Namsa Yedam Village(남사예담촌)
  - Historic Site of Cho Sik (남명조식유적지)
  - Jeongchwiam View Point (정취암 조망)
  - Donguibogam Village (동의보감촌)

== Notable people ==
- Mun Ikchŏm-was from the region when it was called Kangseong. Known for importing cotton seeds to Goryeo from China in 1363.
- Cho Sik- was offered the position of county's governor when it was known as Danseong, which he refused. Known for educating future Confucianists in Mount Jiri.
- Park Hang-seo-South Korean Football coach for the Vietnamese team
- Seongcheol-Korean Seon monk.
- Isang Yun-composer born in the county. However grown up in Tongyeong.

== Twin towns – sister cities ==
Sancheong is twinned with:

- Jinhae-gu, South Korea
- Yeongam, South Korea
- Geumjeong-gu, South Korea
- Seocho-gu, South Korea
- Yuseong-gu, South Korea
- Yuzhou, China
- Huangshan, China

== See also ==
- Sancheong and Hamyang massacre
