= To My Beloved Thief =

2026 South Korean television series

- Promotional poster
- Hangul: 은애하는 도적님아
- Lit.: Dear Bandit
- RR: Eunaehaneun dojeongnima
- MR: Ŭnaehanŭn tojŏngnima
- Genre: Historical; Romantic comedy; Fantasy
- Written by: Lee Sun
- Directed by: Ham Young-geol
- Starring: Nam Ji-hyun; Moon Sang-min; Hong Min-gi; Han So-eun
- Country of origin: South Korea
- Original language: Korean
- No. of episodes: 16

Production
- Executive producers: Yoon Jae-hyuk (CP); Jang Kyung-ik; Yoo Sang-won; Jo Ah-ra
- Producers: Kim Chang-min; Baek Ji-hyun; Ryu Won-sang
- Production company: Studio Dragon

Original release
- Network: KBS2
- Release: January 3 – February 22, 2026

To My Beloved Thief (Korean: 은애하는 도적님아) is a 2026 South Korean television series written by Lee Sun, directed by Ham Young-geol, and starring Nam Ji-hyun, Moon Sang-min, Hong Min-gi, and Han So-eun. The series depicts the story of an uinyeo who secretly becomes a righteous thief, chased by a grand prince who loves solving crimes. It aired on KBS2 from January 3, to February 22, 2026, every Saturday and Sunday at 21:20 (KST).

== Synopsis ==
Set in Joseon, the series follows Hong Eun-jo, a commoner hiding her secret life as the righteous thief Hong Gil-dong, who steals from the rich to help the poor. She attracts the attention of Yi Yeol, a grand prince tasked with capturing her. One night, the souls of the two individuals are swapped, triggered by a mysterious bracelet given to them by a young monk, forcing them to navigate each other's worlds amidst the complexities of duty, identity, and forbidden love.

== Cast ==
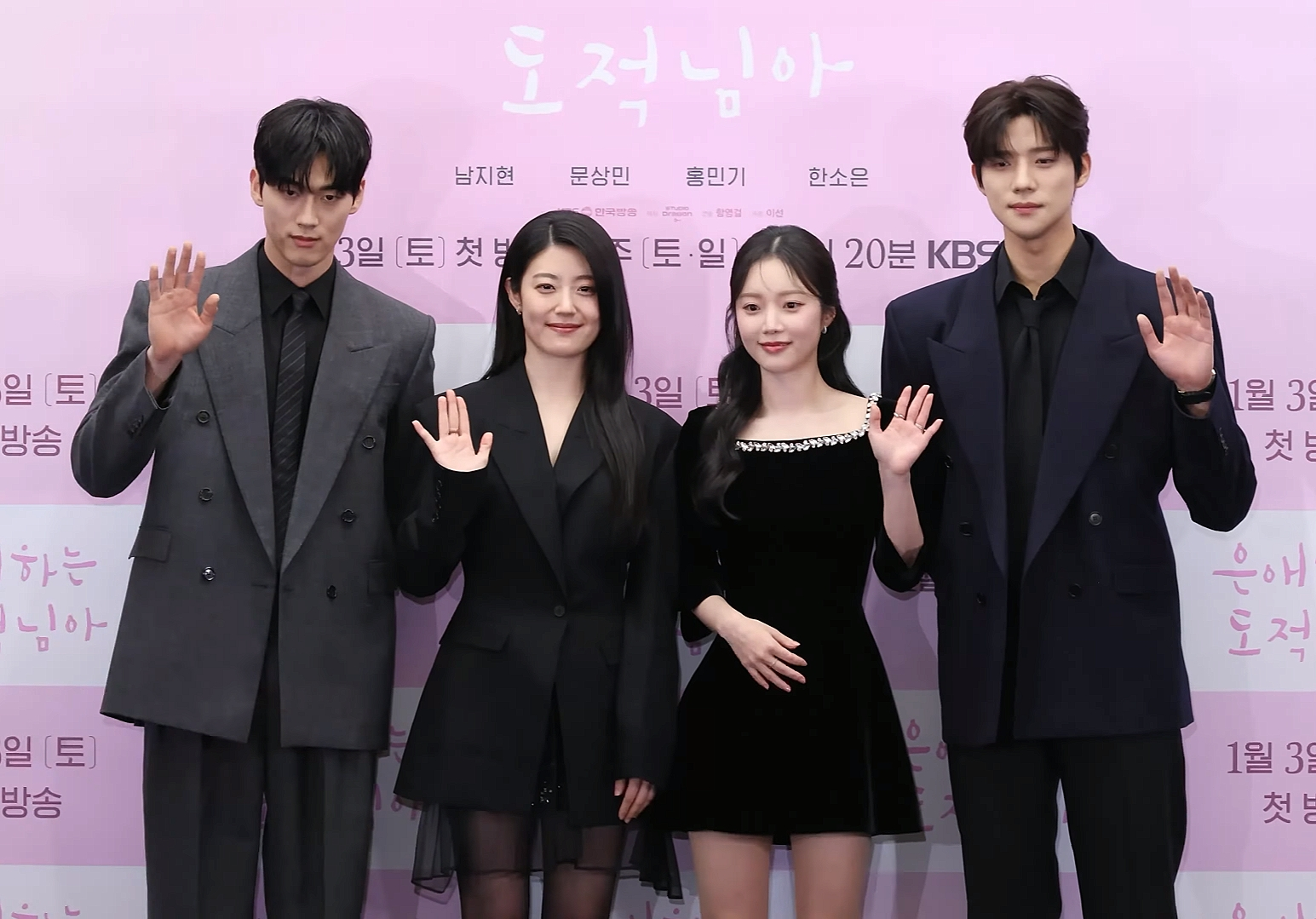
L to R: Hong Min-gi, Nam Ji-hyun, Han So-eun, and Moon Sang-min at the press conference for the series in December 2025

=== Main ===
- Nam Ji-hyun as Hong Eun-jo

Born to a yangban father and a commoner mother, she was legally considered a commoner due to her maternal lineage. When her family's fortunes declined and her father fell ill, she became the family's main support. She is a female physician (uinyeo) and thief, known as Hong Gil-dong in the shadows, leading a double life. A skilled healer by day at Hyeminseo, she treats the sick. A thief by night, she steals the granaries and other goods from corrupt officials to help her people.

- Moon Sang-min as Prince Dowol / Yi Yeol

A grand prince. He lives a seemingly quiet royal life in the shadow of his brother, the King of Joseon, but he's actually resourceful and often sneaks into investigations at the Bureau of Research and Statistics, racking up successes. Then he meets Eun-jo and falls for her without realizing she's the thief he's been chasing.

- Hong Min-gi as Im Jae-yi

Yi Yeol's rival. He has lived under his father's strict control, suppressing his own desires and following his father's plans. He has consistently prioritized his father's expectations, pursuing education and career paths dictated by his father, leaving his personal life and aspirations unfulfilled. The arrival of Eun-jo at his family's mansion marks a turning point, as he experiences unfamiliar emotions and desires, gradually becoming aware of his suppressed emotions.

- Han So-eun as Shin Hae-rim

Born into a noble family, she's Jae-yi's fiancée and the queen's niece. Their engagement was a strategic family arrangement, not a reflection of their personal desires.

=== Supporting ===
- Choi Won-young as Im Sa-hyeong

Jae-yi's father.

- Ha Seok-jin as King Yeonsan / Yi Gyu
- Lee Seung-woo as Daechu

Yi Yeol's bodyguard.

- Song Ji-ho as Hong Dae-il

Eun-jo's older brother.

== Production ==
=== Development ===
Ham Young-geol, who previously helmed KBS Drama Special: The True Love of Madam (2023), was attached to direct. Lee Sun, who won the Excellence Award at Studio Dragon's 2nd Drama Script Contest for the series in 2020, wrote the screenplay. The production is handled by Studio Dragon. Additionally, the series, written by Lee, began serialization on Naver Webtoon on December 27, 2025.

=== Casting ===
In October 2024, Nam Ji-hyun and Moon Sang-min were cast to star.

Ha Seok-jin, Choi Won-young and Hong Min-gi were reportedly set to join the cast in April 2025. On September 10, Han So-eun was reportedly cast.

=== Filming ===
Principal photography began in March 2025, and was concluded in October 2025. Filming for the series took place in Gyeongnam Province over a period of eight months. The main filming locations included the House of Choi Champan in Hadong-gun, Ildu House in Hamyang-gun, Sam-eunjeong in Miryang, and Hwangmaesan mountain in Hapcheon.

== Original soundtrack ==
=== Part 1 ===
Released on January 4, 2026
No.	Title	Lyrics	Music	Artist	Length
1.	"Loving You"	Kim Tae-young; December 32nd	Kim Tae-young	Ha Sung-woon	3:13
2.	"Loving You" (Inst.)		Kim Tae-young		3:13
Total length:					6:26

=== Part 2 ===
Released on January 11, 2026
No.	Title	Lyrics	Music	Artist	Length
1.	"Something Feels Wrong" (뭔가 잘못된 것 같아)	Yoske; Daymoon; Kim Young-hoo; Lee Jung-hyun; Kim Ji-hee	Yoske; Park Ye-rin; Choi Soo-hwan	KickFlip	2:51
2.	"Something Feels Wrong" (뭔가 잘못된 것 같아; Inst.)		Yoske; Park Ye-rin; Choi Soo-hwan		2:51
Total length:					5:42

=== Part 3 ===
Released on January 18, 2026
No.	Title	Lyrics	Music	Artist	Length
1.	"Again"	Petra	Petra; Hyun; Kang Butter	Kassy	4:10
2.	"Again" (Inst.)		Petra; Hyun; Kang Butter		4:10
Total length:					8:20

=== Part 4 ===
Released on January 25, 2026
No.	Title	Lyrics	Music	Artist	Length
1.	"Seen the Scene"	MonoTree	MonoTree	Ha Hyun-sang	3:17
2.	"Seen the Scene" (Inst.)		MonoTree		3:17
Total length:					6:34

=== Part 5 ===
Released on February 1, 2026
No.	Title	Lyrics	Music	Artist	Length
1.	"Words I Never Said" (사랑한다 말할 수 있을까)	Kim Tae-young; December 32nd	Kim Tae-young; Seong Hyeon-taek	Jung Seung-hwan	3:58
2.	"Words I Never Said" (Inst.)		Kim Tae-young; Seong Hyeon-taek		3:58
Total length:					7:56

== Viewership ==
To My Beloved Thief : South Korea viewers per episode (thousands)

Season	Episode number																Average
Season	1	2	3	4	5	6	7	8	9	10	11	12	13	14	15	16	Average
1	786	912	1016	1202	1340	1267	1208	1279	1013	1367	1282	1400	1313	1262	1483	1461	1224

Source: Audience measurement performed nationwide by Nielsen Korea.

Average TV viewership ratings
Ep.	Original broadcast date	Average audience share (Nielsen Korea)	
Ep.	Original broadcast date	Nationwide	Seoul
1	January 3, 2026	4.3% (14th)	4.2% (13th)
2	January 4, 2026	4.5% (9th)	4.1% (12th)
3	January 10, 2026	5.3% (7th)	5.3% (6th)
4	January 11, 2026	6.3% (5th)	6.2% (3rd)
5	January 17, 2026	7.0% (3rd)	6.8% (3rd)
6	January 18, 2026	6.9% (4th)	6.1% (6th)
7	January 24, 2026	6.6% (3rd)	6.2% (3rd)
8	January 25, 2026	7.1% (4th)	6.6% (4th)
9	January 31, 2026	5.5% (3rd)	5.0% (5th)
10	February 1, 2026	7.0% (4th)	6.6% (5th)
11	February 7, 2026	6.8% (3rd)	6.8% (3rd)
12	February 8, 2026	7.3% (4th)	7.4% (3rd)
13	February 14, 2026	6.9% (3rd)	6.6% (3rd)
14	February 15, 2026	6.4% (3rd)	6.2% (3rd)
15	February 21, 2026	7.7% (2nd)	7.8% (2nd)
16	February 22, 2026	7.6% (4th)	6.8% (5th)
Average		6.5%	6.2%
In the table above, the blue numbers represent the lowest ratings and the red numbers represent the highest ratings.

== Accolades ==
Award ceremony	Year	Category	Recipient(s)	Result	Ref.
Baeksang Arts Awards	2026	Best Screenplay	Lee Sun	Nominated	
Baeksang Arts Awards	2026	Best New Actor	Hong Min-gi	Nominated	
