= Cha Woo-min =

South Korean actor (born 2000)

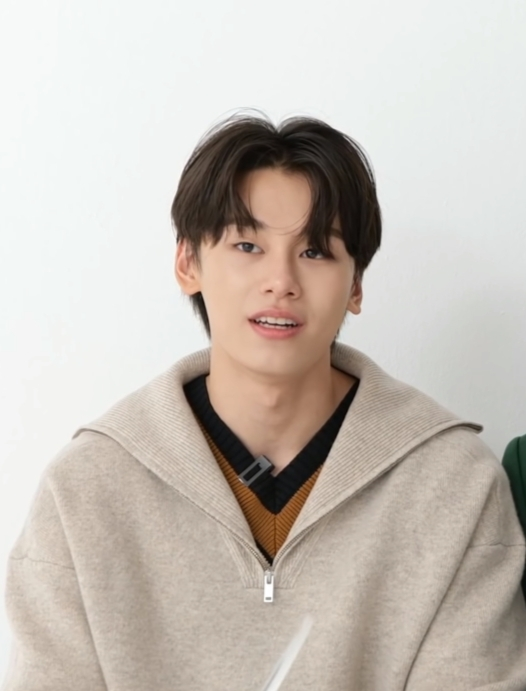
- Cha in December 2021
- Born: Kim Min-woo; October 24, 2000 (age 26); Busan, South Korea
- Education: Seoul Institute of the Arts
- Occupation: Actor
- Years active: 2021–present
- Agent: Just Entertainment

Korean name
- Hangul: 김민우
- RR: Gim Minu
- MR: Kim Minu

Stage name
- Hangul: 차우민
- RR: Cha Umin
- MR: Ch'a Umin

Kim Min-woo (Korean: 김민우; born October 24, 2000), known professionally as Cha Woo-min (차우민) is a South Korean actor under Just Entertainment. He is best known for his roles in Night Has Come (2023) and Study Group (2025).

== Early life ==
Cha Woo-min was born on October 24, 2000, in Busan, South Korea. He attended Seoul Institute of the Arts.

== Filmography ==
=== Film ===
Key
†	Denotes films that have not yet been released

Year	Title	Role	Ref.
2023	Brave Citizen	Lee Moon-ki	
2025	Love Untangled	Kim Hyeon	

=== Television series ===
Key
†	Denotes television productions that have not yet been released

Year	Title	Role	Notes	Ref.
2022	Weak Hero	Kang Woo-young	Season 1	
2023	Night Has Come	Go Kyung-jun		
2025–present	Study Group	Pi Han-wool	Season 1–2	
2025	Melo Movie	Woo Jung-hoo		
2025	Buried Hearts	Ji Seon-u		
2025	Spirit Fingers	Byun Tae-seon		
2026	My Bias, My Boss	Lee Chan		
2026	Take Charge of My Heart	Ji Eun-ho		
2026	The Remarried Empress	Grand Duke Kaufman	Cameo	

=== Web series ===
Year	Title	Role	Ref.
2021	The Tasty Florida	Seo Hae-won	

=== Music video appearances ===
Year	Song title	Artist	Ref.
2022	"When I look at you (가만히 널 바라보면)"	Park Bo-ram	
2025	"Rain Arrives (비가 오면)"	Yang Da-il	
2025	"Reno"	Miyeon (feat. Colde)	

== Awards and nominations ==
Name of the award ceremony, year presented, category, nominee of the award, and the result of the nomination
Award ceremony	Year	Category	Nominee / Work	Result	Ref.
Baeksang Arts Awards	2025	Best New Actor	Study Group	Nominated	
SBS Entertainment Awards	2025	Best New Actor	Buried Hearts	Won	
