= Hong Min-gi =

South Korean actor and model (born 2002)

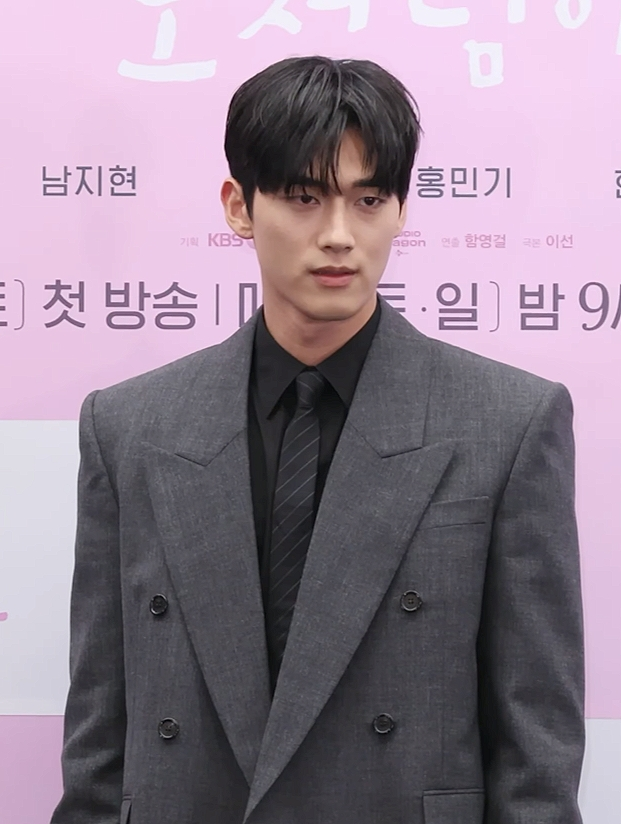
- Hong in December 2025
- Born: March 12, 2002 (age 24); Seoul, South Korea
- Education: Hanlim Multi Art School; Seoul Institute of the Arts
- Occupations: Actor; model
- Years active: 2020–present
- Agent: Fable Company
- Height: 187 cm (6 ft 1 1/2 in)

Korean name
- Hangul: 홍민기
- RR: Hong Mingi
- MR: Hong Min'gi

Hong Min-gi (Korean: 홍민기; born March 12, 2002), is a South Korean actor and model. He is best known for his roles in Night Has Come (2022), Love Your Enemy (2024), Study Group (2025), One: High School Heroes (2025), To My Beloved Thief (2025) and Doctor on the Edge (2026).

== Filmography ==
=== Film ===
Year	Title	Role	Ref.
2021	Hold Me	Yeon-ho	

=== Television series ===
Year	Title	Role	Notes	Ref.
2022	Dear.M	Kim Dong-gyu	Cameo (Ep. 1-2, 10)	
2023	Night Has Come	Jang Hyun-ho		
2024	Love Your Enemy	Seok Ji-won (young)		
2025	Study Group	Park Geon-yeop		
2025	Crushology 101	Jin Hyun-oh		
2025	One: High School Heroes	Kim Nam-hyeop		
2025	Trigger	Kang Seong-jun		
2025	Dear X	Coffee shop customer	Cameo (Ep. 3)	
2026	To My Beloved Thief	Im Jae-yi		
2026	Doctor on the Edge	Hyun Chi-yeon		

=== Web series ===
Year	Title	Role	Ref.
2020	187cm Male Friend and 155cm Female Friend	Min-gi	
2020	Female Friend Among Guys	Min-gi	
2020	30cm Between Us	Min-gi	
2020	My Male Friends Are Too Tall	Min-gi	
2020	Kissing My Bestie	Min-gi	
2022	Because I Don't Want to Go Home	Park Han-bit	

=== Music video appearances ===
Year	Title	Artist	Ref.
2021	"Let It All Go"	Yeseo (예서)	

== Awards and nominations ==
Name of the award ceremony, year presented, category, nominee of the award, and the result of the nomination
Award ceremony	Year	Category	Nominee / Work	Result	Ref.
Baeksang Arts Awards	2026	Best New Actor – Television	To My Beloved Thief	Nominated	
