= Study Group (TV series) =

2025 South Korean television series

- Promotional poster
- Hangul: 스터디그룹
- RR: Seuteodi geurup
- MR: Sŭt'ŏdi kŭrup
- Genre: Action comedy; Teen; Coming-of-age
- Based on: Study Group by Shin Hyung-wook
- Written by: Um Sun-ho; Oh Bo-hyun
- Directed by: Lee Jang-hun; Yoo Beom-sang
- Starring: Hwang Min-hyun; Han Ji-eun; Cha Woo-min; Lee Jong-hyun; Shin Su-hyun; Yoon Sang-jeong; Gong Do-yu
- Country of origin: South Korea
- Original language: Korean
- No. of episodes: 10

Production
- Producers: Lee Hye-young; Lee Myung-jin; Suh Jung-hyun
- Running time: 42–43 minutes
- Production company: Ylab Plex

Original release
- Network: TVING
- Release: January 23 – February 20, 2025

Study Group (Korean: 스터디그룹) is a South Korean television series co-written by Eom Seon-ho and Oh Bo-hyun, directed by Lee Jang-hoon and Yoo Beom-sang, and starring Hwang Min-hyun, Han Ji-eun, Cha Woo-min, Lee Jong-hyun, Shin Su-hyun, Yoon Sang-jeong, and Gong Do-yu. Based on the webtoon of the same name by Shin Hyung-wook, it is about a boy who wants to study hard to achieve his one goal. It premiered on TVING on January 23, 2025.

In August 2025, it was renewed for a second season.

== Synopsis ==
Study Group tells the story of Yoon Ga-min, who is only talented in fighting, trying to study hard to achieve his goal of entering university by forming a study group in the notorious Yusung Technical High School.

== Cast and characters ==
=== Main ===
- Hwang Min-hyun as Yoon Ga-min
  - Choi Seung-hoon as teen Ga-min
  - Jang Sun-yool as young Ga-min

A first year student at Yusung Technical High School who is excellent at fighting, and has a passion for studying but frequently returns with bad grades. He forms a study group in the school with the target of entering university.

- Han Ji-eun as Lee Han-kyung

A temporary teacher at Yusung Technical High School, and is the sturdy backing of the study group.

- Cha Woo-min as Pi Han-wool

A model second year student at Yusung Technical High School.

- Lee Jong-hyun as Kim Se-hyun
  - Shin Seo-woo as young Se-hyun

Ga-min's classmate who forms a study group together with him.

- Shin Su-hyun as Lee Ji-woo
  - Lee Nam-gyeong as young Ji-woo

A first year student at Yusung Technical High School, and is Hyun-woo's twin elder sister. She is part of the study group.

- Yoon Sang-jeong as Choi Hee-won

Ji-woo's best friend who joins the study group.

- Gong Do-yu as Lee Jun
  - Song Seung-hwan as teen Jun
  - Kang Ji-yong as young Jun

A self-proclaimed in the study group. He joins the study group as he sees that Ga-min is good at fighting.

- Jeon So-young as Jang Min-hee (Season 2)

A first year student at Cheongma High School.

- Kim Su-gyeom as Choi Moo-gyu (Season 2)

A third year student at Yusung Technical High School.

- Kwon Sang-woo as Jeon Young-ha (Season 2)

Ga-min's uncle, and Mi-hyeon's younger brother, who trained Ga-min with various fighting skills.

- Yoon Hyun-suk as Ji Young-hyun (Season 2)

=== Supporting ===
- Hong Min-gi as Park Geon-yeop
  - Oh Han-kyul as young Geon-yeop

A first year student at Yusung Technical High School, who struggles to find the murderer of his mother.

- Baek Seo-hoo as Ma Min-hwan

A second year student at Yusung Technical High School, and the closest associate of Han-wool. He is part of the Yeonbaek Gang Quartet.

- Park Yoon-ho as Lee Hyun-woo
  - Jo Yi-hyun as young Hyun-woo

A first year student at Yusung Technical High School, Ga-min's classmate and Ji-woo's twin younger brother.

- Lee Kwang-hee as Jung Do-hoon

A first year student at Yusung Technical High School, and Geon-yeop's associate.

- Joo Yeon-woo as Kim Sun-chul

A third year student at Yusung Technical High School, and the leader of the Yeonseo Three Chuls, who serve as the top bodyguards of Han-wool. He has a desire for studying, but went on the wrong path due to circumstances.

- Kwon Hyung-seok as Lee Dae-chul

A third year student at Yusung Technical High School, and one of the Yeonseo Three Chuls.

- Han Jung-hun as Park Min-chul

A third year student at Yusung Technical High School, and one of the Yeonseo Three Chuls.

- Lim Ji-sub as Anti
  - Park Jun-hyuk as teen Anti
  - Cho Yi-an as young Anti

Former friend of Jun, and currently a part of the Yeonbaek Gang.

- Shim Woo-sung as Na Tae-man

A detective from the Mooncheon Police Station.

- Mo Geon-hu as Guk Gwan-woo

A first year student at Heukchang High School, who is part of the Yeonbaek Gang's main force.

- Seo Dong-gyu as a first year student at Yusung Technical High School

One of the students spreading false rumors about Ga-min.

=== Special appearances ===
- Kim Young-ah as Jeon Mi-hyeon

Ga-min's mother and the director of the Taekwondo Association.

- Kim Young-woong as Se-hyun's father
- Lee Jong-hyuk as Pi Yeon-baek

Han-wool's father who is the boss of the Yeonbaek Gang.

- Jung Jae-sung as the vice principal of Yusung Technical High School
- Kim Min as Oh Jang-ho

The scout in-charge for Yeonbaek Gang.

- Kim Jung-young as Oh Jung-hwa

Former teacher of Yusung Technical High School, and Geon-yeop's mother.

- Jeon Moo-song as Sun-chul's grandfather
- Yoo In-soo as Choo Jae-hwang

A second year student at Yusung Technical High School, and a part of the Yeonbaek Gang Quartet.

- Park Min as Bang Sang-in

A second year student at Yusung Technical High School, and a part of the Yeonbaek Gang Quartet.

== Production ==
=== Development ===
Study Group is co-directed by Lee Jang-hoon and Yoo Beom-sang, and written by Eom Seon-ho and Oh Bo-hyun. It is planned by Studio Dragon and produced by Ylab Plex. The series is based on the popular Webtoon of the same name written by Shin Hyung-wook.

On May 12, 2025, a representative from Studio Dragon confirmed to media outlets that the second season was already in the early stages of planning.

=== Casting ===
==== Season 1 ====
On August 10, 2023 Hwang Min-hyun was reportedly cast as stated by his agency, Pledis Entertainment. On September 20, TVING revealed the main cast which included Hwang Min-hyun, Han Ji-eun, Cha Woo-min, Lee Jong-hyun, Shin Su-hyun, Yoon Sang-jeong and Gong Do-yu.

==== Season 2 ====
In January 2026, Hwang Min-hyun was confirmed to return for season 2. Shin Su-hyun, Yoon Sang-jeong and Gong Do-yu would also return for season 2.

In addition, Jeon So-young, Kim Su-gyeom and Kwon Sang-woo were reported to join season 2.

On July 14, 2026, it was confirmed that Yoon Hyun-suk, formerly of boy group CIX, was confirmed to join season 2, and that filming is currently in progress.

== Original soundtrack ==
=== Part 1 ===
All lyrics are written by Choi Jae-gyu; all music is composed by Lee Kwan-hyung, Choi and Jeon Hae-jeong.

Released on January 24, 2025
| No. | Title | Artist | Length |
|---|---|---|---|
| 1. | "Back Packer" | Seok Matthew, Park Gun-wook (Zerobaseone) | 2:57 |
| 2. | "Back Packer" (Inst.) | | 2:57 |
| Total length: | | | 5.14 |

=== Part 2 ===
All tracks are written by Lee Kwan-hyung, Choi Jae-gyu and Jeon Hae-jeong.

Released on January 30, 2025
| No. | Title | Artist | Length |
|---|---|---|---|
| 1. | "Hollo" (홀로) | Bang Ye-dam | 3:46 |
| 2. | "Hollo" (홀로; Inst.) | | 3:46 |
| 3. | "Hollo" (홀로; Drama version) | Bang Ye-dam | 4:09 |
| 4. | "Hollo" (홀로; Drama version; Inst.) | | 4:09 |
| Total length: | | | 15:10 |

=== Part 3 ===
All tracks are written by Pyeon Jun-won, Jayde, Groovila, Kim Ha-on, Jeong Jae-hee and Myung Hye-min.

Released on February 6, 2025
| No. | Title | Artist | Length |
|---|---|---|---|
| 1. | "Hood" | Haon | 3:08 |
| 2. | "Hood" (Inst.) | | 3:08 |
| Total length: | | | 6:16 |

=== Part 4 ===
All tracks are written by Jo Ho-jin, Im So-young, eio and Choi Jae-gyu.

Released on February 13, 2025
| No. | Title | Artist | Length |
|---|---|---|---|
| 1. | "Let's do this" | Hanjun, Robin and Eddie (N.SSign) | 2:41 |
| 2. | "Let's do this" (Inst.) | | 2:41 |
| Total length: | | | 5:22 |

== Release ==
Study Group was confirmed to premiere on TVING on January 23, 2025, with two episodes released every Thursday for five weeks.

== Accolades ==
=== Awards and nominations ===
| Award ceremony | Year | Category | Nominee | Result | Ref. |
|---|---|---|---|---|---|
| Baeksang Arts Awards | 2025 | Best New Actor | Cha Woo-min | Nominated | |
| Baeksang Arts Awards | 2025 | Best Technical Achievement | Jo Dong-hyuk (Stunt) | Nominated | |
| Global OTT Awards | 2025 | Best OTT Original | Study Group | Nominated | |
