= Idol: The Coup =

2021 South Korean television series

- Promotional poster
- Also known as: Idol
- Hangul: 아이돌: 더 쿠데타
- RR: Aidol: deo kudeta
- MR: Aidol: tŏ k'udet'a
- Genre: Drama; Music
- Created by: JTBC
- Written by: Jung Yoon-jung
- Directed by: Noh Jong-chan
- Starring: Ahn Hee-yeon; Ahn Sol-bin; Han So-eun; Chu So-jung; Kim Ji-won; Kwak Si-yang; Kim Min-kyu
- Music by: Lee Kwang-hee
- Country of origin: South Korea
- Original language: Korean
- No. of episodes: 12

Production
- Executive producers: Seong Ji-hye; Moon Seong-ho
- Producers: Cho Jun-hyung; Choi Hyuk-jin; Daniel Park
- Editor: Beak Kyung-hwa
- Running time: 70–90 minutes
- Production companies: JTBC Studios; Take2 Media Group; Transparent Arts

Original release
- Network: JTBC
- Release: November 8 – December 14, 2021

Idol: The Coup (Korean: 아이돌: 더 쿠데타) is a 2021 South Korean television series directed by No Jong-chan and starring an ensemble cast featuring Ahn Hee-yeon, Ahn Sol-bin, Han So-eun, Chu So-jung, Kim Ji-won, Kwak Si-yang and Kim Min-kyu. Written by Jung Yoon-jung, it tells the story of a "failed" K-pop idol girl group who need just one shot at success for them to disband. It aired from November 8 to December 14, 2021 on JTBC's Mondays and Tuesdays at 23:00 (KST). It is also available simultaneously with Korea on iQIYI for streaming worldwide.

== Synopsis ==
After losing support from their parent company Starpeace Entertainment, the members of the K-pop idol girl group Cotton Candy—Jenna, Hyun-ji, Stella, El, and Chae-ah—face the inescapable prospect of disbanding. The company has neglected them while a follow-up boy group, Mars, has taken center stage and become top idols. Cotton Candy's six years of trying to make a comeback seems futile, as they suffer heavily from the harshness of the entertainment industry, and the contempt of the general public who tag them as "failed idols" (mangdol). Eventually, Cotton Candy resolves to fight against the people and forces that try to drag them down, striving with all their might for even just one shot at success: they aim to win the No. 1 spot in a music show before disbanding for good.

== Cast ==
=== Main ===
- Ahn Hee-yeon as Kim Je-na (Jenna)

The leader and a sub-vocalist of the struggling K-pop girl group Cotton Candy under Starpeace Entertainment. Jenna is a multitalented composer and producer who makes songs for their team. She bears the burden of keeping their team together, aiming towards their success, despite being neglected by Starpeace and the dilemmas that hamper their path towards success. She is a persevering and fearless artist, though she is also prone to wavering in her stand when faced by difficult problems.

- Ahn Sol-bin as Oh Hyun-ji

The youngest member, main dancer and a rapper of the struggling K-pop girl group Cotton Candy under Starpeace Entertainment. As a talented dancer and choreographer, Hyun-ji is in charge of working out their team's dance moves. She appears to be a troublemaker inclined to anger, but she is actually loving of the people around her, and dreams to make her sickly grandmother proud of her. She speaks in a strong Gyeongsang dialect when talking to her grandmother and the people from her hometown.

- Han So-eun as Jang Stella

The eldest member and a sub-vocalist of the struggling K-pop girl group Cotton Candy under Starpeace Entertainment. Stella is a pure-hearted girl who believes in Jenna's leadership of the group. She battles with anxiety issues triggered by her dark past which she fears might drag their team down.

- Chu So-jung as Kang Yu-ri (El)

The main vocalist of the struggling K-pop girl group Cotton Candy under Starpeace Entertainment. El became a member of Cotton Candy after leaving her previous girl group KillA. She has a cold, realistic personality that can sometimes make her look selfish. Due to Cotton Candy's failure and imminent disbanding, she gains a strong desire to pursue a solo career.

- Kim Ji-won as Park Chae-ah

The lead dancer and a sub-vocalist of the struggling K-pop girl group Cotton Candy under Starpeace Entertainment. Chae-ah hails from a rich family but is not supported by her mother. She does not feel confident of her skills, and this pushes her to practice hard for their team's performances.

- Kwak Si-yang as Cha Jae-hyuk

The CEO of Starpeace Entertainment; Seo Ji-han's half-brother and CEO Ma Jin-woo's successor. CEO Cha became the head of Starpeace Entertainment after the death of its former CEO and founder Ma Jin-woo. He is a cold-hearted entrepreneur who treats the company's artists as commodities, especially Cotton Candy. His judgement and authority soon gets challenged when Jenna and her co-members in Cotton Candy go against his will.

- Kim Min-kyu as Seo Ji-han

The leader and main vocalist of the popular K-pop boy group Mars under Starpeace Entertainment; CEO Cha Jae-hyuk's half-brother. Ji-han, a skilled music producer, yearns to become an artist that is beyond singing, dancing and popularity, and he ponders on what should truly define him as an artist. Defiant of CEO Cha's harsh treatment of artists, he sees himself in the struggles of his senior labelmate Cotton Candy.

=== Supporting ===
==== People around Cotton Candy ====
- Kang Jae-joon as Jin Doo-ho

An employee of Starpeace Entertainment; Cotton Candy's former manager. Doo-ho is a very supportive manager to Cotton Candy, and he continues to care for the group even when the company neglects them. He is later killed in a vehicular accident on the same day as his boss Ma Jin-woo's death.

- Kim Ji-in as Choi So-yeon

The leader of the K-pop girl group KillA; she is in conflict with Cotton Candy member El.

- Park Si-hyun as Ae-rin

Hyun-ji's friend.

==== Mars ====
- Cho Jun-young as Han Seon-woo (Ray)

A vocalist and rapper of the popular K-pop boy group Mars under Starpeace Entertainment. A talented and workaholic artist, Ray worries about Ji-han's involvement with Cotton Candy, thinking it may affect their own team.

- Baek Seo-hoo as Park Tae-young

A sub-vocalist and rapper of the popular K-pop boy group Mars under Starpeace Entertainment.

- Hong Eun-ki as Kim Yul

A main dancer and vocalist of the popular K-pop boy group Mars under Starpeace Entertainment.

- Lee Eun-sang as Park Eun-dan (Dan)

A main dancer, sub-vocalist and rapper of the popular K-pop boy group Mars under Starpeace Entertainment.

==== Starpeace Entertainment ====
- Jung Woong-in as Ma Jin-woo.

The founder and former CEO of Starpeace Entertainment; CEO Cha Jae-hyuk's predecessor. CEO Ma organized Cotton Candy, the company's pioneering idol group, and was once doting and supportive of them. He began neglecting Cotton Candy when the group started losing popularity and the company's follow-up boy group, Mars, became much more successful. After six years of persistent pleading from Cotton Candy and Doo-ho, he decides to readopt the group but is cut short by his untimely death on the same day as Doo-ho's vehicular accident.

- Lee You-jin as Bong Chung-bong (Bbiyong)

A genius music producer working under Starpeace Entertainment.

- Ahn Se-ha as Yoon Se-yeol

The general manager of Starpeace Entertainment.

=== Others ===
- Cha Sun-woo as Troy

One of the industry's leading music producers who sweep the awards ceremony, and a competitor to Bbiyong.

- Son Byong-ho as Kim Ho-yong

A film director who is involved in Stella's dark past.

- Shin Jae-hoon as Mo Ga-jin

A journalist under the Entertainment Department of the news agency Issue&24. Ga-jin is persistent in sticking his nose in the entertainment industry and is notorious for writing exposés about celebrities.

- Yoon Bok-in as Dr. Cha Mi-yeon

CEO Cha Jae-hyuk's aunt and the director of a clinic specializing in oriental medicine.

- Oh Yoon-hong as Jang Stella's mother

=== Special appearances ===
- Kim Byung-chun as manager of the management department (Ep. 2)
- Jang Sung-kyu as radio DJ (Ep.1)
- Big Naughty as himself (Ep.1)
- Narsha as music talk show MC (Ep.1)
- Raiden as himself (Ep.1)
- Lia Kim as herself (Ep.10)
- Oh Jeong-yeon as Interview MC (Ep.11)
- Eunseo as Music Tank MC (Ep.12)
- Kang Min-hee as Music Tank MC (Ep.12)
- Son Sook as Hyun-ji's grandma (Ep.12)

== Episodes ==
The following table contains the episodes of the series:

No.	Title	Directed by	Written by	Original release date
1	"I Am a Failed Idol Singer"; Transliteration: "Naneun mangdorida" (Korean: 나는 망돌이다)	Noh Jong-chan	Jung Yoon-jung	November 8, 2021
Jenna, Hyun-ji, Stella, El and Chae-ah—the members of the K-pop girl group Cotton Candy—struggle to make a living, six years after their boss CEO Ma of Starpeace Entertainment began neglecting them. While the other members do meager part-time jobs, Jenna take on barely productive gigs in her efforts to keep Cotton Candy alive in the entertainment industry.
2	"Should We Disband?"; Transliteration: "Uri haeche halkka?" (Korean: 우리 해체 할까?)	Noh Jong-chan	Jung Yoon-jung	November 9, 2021
Tensions within Cotton Candy get worse as El seeks for opportunities outside the group and Hyun-ji gets gripped with the agony of their failure. While Jenna, Hyun-ji, Stella and Chae-ah prepare for a countryside gig, El learns of a shocking news about Jenna and CEO Ma.
3	"Parting"; Transliteration: "Ibyeol" (Korean: 이별)	Noh Jong-chan	Jung Yoon-jung	November 15, 2021
Jenna tries clearing the misunderstanding that El confronted her about, but El and Hyun-ji remain frustrated. Ji-han of the boy group Mars, Cotton Candy's junior labelmate, asks Jenna to evaluate his song. Jenna rushes home as Hyun-ji goes berserk and threatens to kill CEO Ma and herself.
4	"How to Use Your 1% Potential"; Transliteration: "Il peosenteu-ui ganeungseong sayongbeop" (Korean: 1%의 가능성 사용법)	Noh Jong-chan	Jung Yoon-jung	November 16, 2021
Jenna and her co-members are in immense grief after the untimely deaths of CEO Ma and their former manager Doo-ho. Cha Jae-hyuk becomes Starpeace Entertainment's new CEO. As Cotton Candy rise again from their mourning, they take on CEO Cha's "1% potential" challenge.
5	"Assistance, So Your Heart Might Burst"; Transliteration: "Joryeok, simjang-i teojyeo nagal su itge" (Korean: 조력, 심장이 터져 나갈 수 있게)	Noh Jong-chan	Jung Yoon-jung	November 22, 2021
Jenna and Ji-han agree on a scandalous plot against CEO Cha, but things do not go as planned. Jenna asks genius producer Bbiyong to work on Cotton Candy's new song, one of her original compositions. When the production gets repeatedly delayed, Jenna confronts Bbiyong and discovers the truth.
6	"Troy"; Transliteration: "Teuroi" (Korean: 트로이)	Noh Jong-chan	Jung Yoon-jung	November 23, 2021
After the snag with Bbiyong, Cotton Candy resorts to let another top producer Troy work on their new song but Troy is an acquaintance who bears a grudge against them. Upon Ji-han's suggestion, CEO Cha offers Cotton Candy a chance to perform onstage through a collaboration with Mars.
7	"El" (Korean: 엘)	Noh Jong-chan	Jung Yoon-jung	November 29, 2021
Jenna faces the challenge of convincing the hard-bitten El meet with Troy in order for the resentful producer to work on the song. After El begrudgingly confronts Troy about their bitter past, Troy finally accepts Cotton Candy's song but it still comes with a price that threatens to upend the Mars-Cotton Candy collab.
8	"The Flower Bloomed"; Transliteration: "Kkot pyeotda" (Korean: 꽃 폈다)	Noh Jong-chan	Jung Yoon-jung	November 30, 2021
Jenna's conscience pushes her to join El in paying the price of working with Troy: working with El's previous group KillA who also bears a grudge against El. This pushes CEO Cha to have the Mars-Cotton Candy collab pre-filmed instead of performed live and makes Troy rethink his hard feelings for El. Bbiyong discovers the conflict between Troy, El and KillA and spills this to a notorious showbiz journalist Mo Ga-jin to incite public clamor against Cotton Candy and Mars.
9	"Crash"	Noh Jong-chan	Jung Yoon-jung	December 6, 2021
Jenna discovers that Bbiyong plagiarized her original composition—Cotton Candy's new song—and turned it into a song for a Mars subunit consisting Ji-han and co-member Ray. El reunites with Cotton Candy, and the group decides to defend their song. Soon, news of Cotton Candy allegedly plagiarizing the Mars subunit song breaks out. As Cotton Candy gets attacked by negative sentiment from Mars' fans, CEO Cha and Ji-han uncovers the truth behind the plagiarism issue.
10	"One Day"	Noh Jong-chan	Jung Yoon-jung	December 7, 2021
Ji-han goes off-grid after confronting Bbiyong but getting threatened by him instead. As Cotton Candy's longtime fans reemerge and pledge their support, CEO Cha finds out Ji-han's location, convincing the conflicted artist to take action and leave the rest to him. Ji-han exposes Bbiyong's crime in a press conference and announces putting off the plans for the Mars subunit. When the sympathetic Cotton Candy also announces putting off the release of their new song in lieu of Jenna's other original composition, Ji-han makes an offer to Jenna.
11	"Stella"; Transliteration: "Seutella" (Korean: 스텔라)	Noh Jong-chan	Jung Yoon-jung	December 13, 2021
Stella's traumatic past becomes a reemerging challenge to Cotton Candy when the man of her nightmares, controversial film director Kim Ho-yong, appears to her once again. Chae-ah receives a request for collaboration from Ji-han's co-member Dan. With help from her co-members, Stella overcomes her fears and confronts Director Kim, who threatens to leak a video that could disgrace her and the group.
12	"Even Nameless Flowers Bloom With All Their Might"; Transliteration: "Ireum eomneun deulkkotdo on himeul dahae pinda" (Korean: 이름 없는 들꽃도 온 힘을 다해 핀다)	Noh Jong-chan	Jung Yoon-jung	December 14, 2021
Ji-han and Troy try to convince Bbiyong to not let his failure pull him back from becoming the true music producer he once was. Cotton Candy faces one last but grave challenge in their path to becoming No. 1.

== Production ==
It is a joint Korean-American drama in which Take-Two Media Group and JTBC Studios collaborated with the American company Transparent Arts, to which Tiffany Hwang belongs.

== Ratings ==
Average TV viewership ratings
Ep.	Original broadcast date	Average audience share (Nielsen Korea)
Ep.	Original broadcast date	Nationwide
1	November 8, 2021	0.751% (40th)
2	November 9, 2021	0.648% (43rd)
3	November 15, 2021	0.656% (39th)
4	November 16, 2021	0.562% (46th)
5	November 22, 2021	0.504% (47th)
6	November 23, 2021	0.686% (40th)
7	November 29, 2021	0.354% (51st)
8	November 30, 2021	0.751% (47th)
9	December 6, 2021	0.699% (44th)
10	December 7, 2021	0.437% (54th)
11	December 13, 2021	0.584% (53rd)
12	December 14, 2021	0.584% (55th)
Average		0.601%

- In the table above, the blue numbers represent the lowest ratings and the red numbers represent the highest ratings.
- This drama airs on a cable channel/pay TV which normally has a relatively smaller audience compared to free-to-air TV/public broadcasters (KBS, SBS, MBC and EBS).
