= Night Has Come (TV series) =

2023 South Korean television series

- Promotional poster
- Hangul: 밤이 되었습니다
- RR: Bami doeeotseumnida
- MR: Pami toeŏssŭmnida
- Genre: Thriller; Mystery; Revenge; Horror; Slasher
- Written by: Kang Min-ji
- Directed by: Lim Dae-woong
- Starring: Lee Jae-in; Kim Woo Seok; Choi Ye-bin; Cha Woo-min; Ahn Ji-ho; Jung So-ri
- Country of origin: South Korea
- Original language: Korean
- No. of episodes: 12

Production
- Running time: 35 minutes
- Production companies: Studio X+U; EO Contents Group

Original release
- Network: U+ Mobile TV
- Release: December 4 – December 21, 2023

Night Has Come (Korean: 밤이 되었습니다) is a 2023 South Korean television series written by Kang Min-ji, directed by Lim Dae-woong, and starring Lee Jae-in, Kim Woo-seok, Choi Ye-bin, Cha Woo-min, Ahn Ji Ho, and Jung So-ri. It was released on U+ Mobile TV from December 4 to 21, 2023, and every Monday to Thursday. It is also available for streaming on Netflix in South Korea, and on Viu and Viki in selected regions.

== Synopsis ==
A group of high school students is forced to play a deadly real-life game of Mafia at a retreat center. The class 2–3 students from Yooil High School go on a field trip to the centre, however their teacher and another class soon disappears. When night comes, all the students in the building receive a message that indicates that the mafia game is about to begin. The only way to survive is to eliminate fellow classmates and find the Mafia.

== Cast and characters ==
=== Main ===
- Lee Jae-in as Lee Yoon-seo

Being physically weak, she has spent a lot of time alone. She doesn't interact much with her classmates, with her only friends being Oh Jung-won and Kim Jun-hee. As a fan of mystery novels like Stephen King and Ellery Queen's, she is exceptionally observant. Even though she always squabbles with her childhood friend Joon-hee, she has had a crush on him for a long time. When she arrives at the retreat center, everything seems oddly familiar, including a blurry ghost, who she soon realizes is trying to tell her something. As the Mafia game continues, there are so many friends she needs to save, yet only one person can make it out alive. To survive, she is forced to doubt and betray those she's been with until now. In this crazy situation, Yoon-seo ends up getting clues from the ghost leading to a massive discovery.

- Kim Woo-seok as Kim Jun-hee

The class president of class 2–3. With his caring and considerate nature, Joon-hee is called an idol at school. He is likable and clumsy, but his righteous manner always fuels conflict with Kyung-jun's squad. Da-beum says he did not care about the students, Just about his reputation, which was a false accusation. He and Yoon-seo are childhood friends, that he treats her like family and always looks out for her. Once the Mafia game starts, he only worries about Yoon-seo being suspected. He tries to remain outwardly calm, but his world crumbles down after witnessing the consecutive deaths of his friends. Joon-hee resolves to do whatever it takes to keep Yoon-seo alive.

- Choi Ye-bin as Oh Jung-won

The top student, Jung-won, has more enemies than friends due to her blunt personality. She is the target of everyone's jealousy but chooses to ignore them. Sharing minor interests and personalities, Yoon-seo became her only friend. To survive the game, she realises something tragic related to her best friend. Even though she hates being with other colleagues, she eventually unites with others to solve the curse.

- Cha Woo-min as Go Kyung-jun

One to be feared that all delinquent behaviors start from Kyung-jun. Born rich and smart, he has the ability to talk his way out. But this time, things don't go as he controls. He thought no one would dare to point fingers at him, even in this crazy situation. But with someone dying every day and himself helplessly falling asleep at night, he realizes there's no safe tomorrow. He has only one goal in mind: to make it out alive.

- Ahn Ji-ho as Jin Da-beom

As the weakest member of Yooil High School, he is bullied by Kyung-jun every day and hides his anger under his weak appearance. He was the first to realize that the Mafia game was 'real life' thanks to his sharp wit and brain power that he gained from being bullied, and he adapted faster than anyone else. He was in a complex state of mind between his hatred for the classmates who bullied him and his friendship for some of his friends who treated him warmly.

- Jung So-Ri as Kim So-mi

The vice class president of class 2–3. She is quick-witted, easily instigates her friends. To her, Yoon-seo's presence is always a thorn in her eye. When the Mafia game starts, she tries to lead the game as she wants to survive, but begins to panic when things don't go as her expected.

=== Supporting ===
- Park Ju-won as Ahn Na-hee

A student of class 2–3, who is not so easily adapting to the Mafia game. being more on the soft and shy side, she often gets talked over or ignored by her friends, so she never really argues back. Being on the softer side, she can barely stay afoot as students and friends all around her start dying horrifically. her role as the police makes her feel even more guilty as she wishes she uses her abilities to help in the investigation better.She has a sweet crush on a fellow classmate and friend of hers, Jang Hyeon ho. Hyeon ho being on the athletic and more popular side, she cant help but blush when they interact. But her world crumbles apart when one night he dies right in front of her eyes.

- Oh Jung-taek as Cha Yoo-joon

A student of class 2–3, who is dating Ji-soo and the one who tries to protect himself and Ji-soo. Being the more passive one in the relationship, always letting her take charge, he is seen as a coward most of the time, so on his final nights, he decides to make it right. Despite his special role, he makes selfish decisions throughout the game out due to him fearing for his life, which he later regrets deeply especially when someone close to him is killed.

- Kim Min-seo as Choi Joo-won

A bullied student of class 2–3. A Friend of Jin Da beom, being a fellow victim of kyung Jun's bullying antics.

- Seo Dong-hyun as Park Woo-ram

A student of class 2–3, whose hobby is filming and taking photos and has a crush on Lee Joo-young. He has a more silly and fun personality, being best friends with Hyeon-ho and Jun-hee. He tries his best to defy the role that was given to him by the game, but theres nothing he can do to stop it, which almost crushes him as he feels his friends support, who are unaware of his dark secrets.

- Chun Young-min as Park Ji-soo

A student of class 2–3, who is dating Yoo-jun. Her personality can be described as more domnimant and feisty as well as stubborn, especially when it comes to standing her ground for herself and Yoo joon. Making her a target for quite a few people's hatred.

- Song Byung-geun as Im Eun-chan

A student of class 2–3. He is the leader of a band club at Yooil High School and yeon-woo's best friend. Having a more fun and light hearted personality, Yeon woo's goofyness rubbing off on him and always making him laugh. He sees his other best friend Eun ha like a little sister, and her death absolutely breaks the trio into shambles.

- Kim So-hee as Baek Eun-ha

A member of the band club from class 2–3 at Yooil High School. Friend of Eun chan and Yeon woo, fellow members of the band club, she sees them as her older brothers and hangs out with them all the time, making them more protective over her.

- Park Yoon-ho as Heo Yool

A member of the band club from class 2–3 at Yooil High School. Known as the class clown, being the absolute biggest prankster and crazy goofball of the class. but also becoming the first target of the game. Him and Eun ha always had a bit of tension, some say it was friendly, some say it was more than that, which causes her to be a suspect for his death

- Hong Sung-pyo as Nam Yeon-woo

A member of the band club from class 2–3 at Yooil High School and Eun-Chan's best friend. He can be described as fun and silly, always making others laugh.

- Kang Seol as Choi Mi-na

A member of the dance club from class 2–3 at Yooil High School and Joo-young's best friend.

- Kim Gyu-bin as Lee Joo-young

A member of the dance club from class 2–3 at Yooil High School and Mi-na's best friend.

- Hong Min-gi as Jang Hyun-ho

A member of the basketball club from class 2–3 at Yooil High School. He is Dong-hyun and Jun-hee's best friend and the one who always looks out for his class mate and friend Ahn Na hee, who he has slight feelings for. He's known as a confident and righteous captain, always being others strength even at his weakest, showing his true care, nobility and selflessness. He's one of the only who can stand an actual ground alongside Jun-hee against Goh Kyung jun's group. which ends up not being very favourfull for him.

- Do Byeong-hun as Kim Dong-hyun

A member of the sports club from class 2–3 at Yooil High School and Hyun-ho's best friend. Unlike Hyeon ho, Dong-hyun is more on serious and stoic side, not as welcoming as Hyeon ho which balances them out. He also becomes friends with Jun-hee and Woo-ram through their mutual friend Hyeon ho.

- Park San-eun as Shin Seung-bin

A member of a violent group of bullies led by Lyung-jun at Yooil High School. Out of the three, he's definitely the more aggressive type, always picking on Jin ha who he sees as inferior. such great friends, arent they?...

- Bae Jae-young as Kim Jin-ha

A member of a violent group of bullies led by Kyung-jun at Yooil High School. Out of the three, he's on the more cowardish and emotional type, though as if he doesnt actually wanna do what he does, showing he has at least some morals, but no will to back them up.

=== Extended ===
- Won Yu-jin as Kang Ye-won

A student of class 2–3 at Yooil High School.

- Cha Yoo-hyun as Lee Sang-hwan

A student of class 2–3 at Yooil High School.

- Kim Kyung-min as Kim Hyung-seok

A student of class 2–3 at Yooil High School.

- Goo Ha-ri as Lee Soo-bin

A student of class 2–3 at Yooil High School.

- Kim Chang-ho as Park Ji-hoon

A student of class 2–3 at Yooil High School.

- Jang Yeon-joo as Oh Jin-seo

A student of class 2–3 at Yooil High School.

- Jang Yun-jin as Oh Hye-seung

A student of class 2–3 at Yooil High School.

- Kim Bum-joong as Lee Hyun-jun

A student of class 2–3 at Yooil High School.

- Song Ji-woo as Park Jeong-eun

A student of class 2–3 at Yooil High School.

- Song Ha-jin as Kim Yeon-ju

A student of class 2–3 at Yooil High School.

=== Special appearances ===
- Lami as Park Se-eun

A bullied student of class 2–3, who is also both friend of Yoon-seo and Jun-hee. After being face-changed by a classmate's AI edits, sparking inappropriate rumors about her, she could not withstand the pressure of public opinion and committed suicide. Her suicide is the reason that her parents created the game. Her Game version is Jung-won.

- Kim Tae-hoon as Se-eun's father
- Kim Joo-ryoung as Se-eun's mother
- Jo Young-joon as teacher

== Production ==
=== Development ===
Director Lim Dae-woong, who directed Horror Stories (2012) and Search (2020), and writer Kang Min-ji, team up for the series. Studio X+U and EO Contents Group managed the production. They began to crank-in in July 2023.

=== Casting ===
On July 17, 2023, lineup of the lead stars was revealed by releasing the photos from the script reading of the cast. On the same month, Kang Seol, Bae Jae-young, Kim So-hee, and Park Ju-won were officially confirmed to appear on the series.

In August 2023, Song Byung-geun, and Seo Dong-hyun were reportedly cast for the series.

=== Filming ===
After completing the casting of the series, Principal photography took place from July 31, 2023, to October 13, 2023.

== Release ==
Studio X+U confirmed the release date which would be on December 4, 2023, and each episode was released every Monday to Thursday. In addition, it was also confirmed that the series would be released via Netflix in South Korea, and OTT platforms such as Viki in 190 countries, Amazon Prime Video in Japan, friDay video in Taiwan, MONOMAX in Thailand, and Viu in 16 countries.

== Awards and nominations ==
Award Ceremony	Year	Category	Nominee / Work	Result	Ref.
Blue Dragon Series Awards	2024	Best New Actor	Kim Woo-seok	Nominated	
