= The Apartment Job =

2026 South Korean television series

- Promotional poster
- Hangul: 아파트
- Lit.: Apartment
- RR: Apateu
- MR: Ap'at'ŭ
- Genre: Crime comedy
- Written by: Kim Yoon-young
- Directed by: Jo Yong-won
- Starring: Ji Sung; Ha Yoon-kyung; Park Byung-eun; Moon So-ri
- Country of origin: South Korea
- Original language: Korean
- No. of episodes: 12

Production
- Running time: 70 minutes
- Production companies: SLL; Red Nine Pictures

Original release
- Network: JTBC
- Release: July 11 – August 16, 2026

The Apartment Job (Korean: 아파트) is a 2026 South Korean crime comedy television series written by Kim Yoon-young, directed by Jo Yong-won, and starring Ji Sung, Ha Yoon-kyung, Park Byung-eun, and Moon So-ri. The series aired on JTBC from July 11 to August 16, 2026, every Saturday at 22:40 (KST) and Sunday at 22:30 (KST). It is also available for streaming on Netflix.

== Cast ==
=== Main ===
- Ji Sung as Park Hae-gang
  - Lee Jong-hyun as teen Park Hae-gang

He becomes the Residents' Council Chairman to raise 10 billion won in capital to save Yong-man, whom he considers a father figure.

- Ha Yoon-kyung as Kang Ha-ri

A character whose goal is to become a lawyer at the large law firm We Partners, but in reality works at the firm's free consultation counter and becomes entangled with Park Hae-gang.

- Park Byung-eun as Lee Chung-won

Representative of the True Value apartment construction company and penthouse resident who possesses good looks, wealth, eloquence, and wit through a relaxed tone and gentle expression. However, he delivered a twist by immediately revealing a sharp and cold side as he confronted Park Hae-gang, who was after Jang Chung-geum or the long-term reserve fund used for apartment repairs.

- Moon So-ri as Jang Suk-jin

A notorious busybody who finds 24 hours a day insufficient to meddle in every neighborhood affair.

=== Supporting ===
Intermittent Family

- Kim Won-hae as Hwang In-sik or "Lizard"
- Hwang Hee as Jang Je-gil
- Jeong Soon-won as Kim Gyeong-nam
- Kim Kyu-won as Kim Dong-hee or "Big Brother"
- Kim Han-kyul as Kim Gyeong-buk

Apartment Residents

- Son Ji-yoon as Ru-i's mother
- Jung Yi-rang as Seo-jun's mother
- Shin Soo-jung as Hye-jun's mother
- Yim Sa-rang as Min-jun's mother

True Value Management

- Baek Hyun-jin as Seo Kang-won

The current president of the resident representatives

- Jung Seung-gil as Choi Young-jae
- Ryu Hyun-kyung as Kang Ha-jeong

Ha-ri's older sister.

People around Park Hae-gang

- Jung Jin-young as Park Yong-man

One Club Members

- Choi Duk-moon as Choi Seung-ho
- Oh Dae-suk as Song U-sik
- Park Jung-hak as Yoo Gwang-ho
- Choi Jin-young as Lee Sang Gyu
- Jung Hee-tae as Kwak Ju-gwon

== Production ==
=== Development ===
The series is directed by Jo Yong-won, who won the Best Director award at the Seoul Drama Awards for Missing Child (2021), and written by Kim Yoon-young, who previously wrote Kaist (1999–2000), Sweet Palpitations (2011), and My Strange Hero (2018–2019). It is co-produced by SLL and Red Nine Pictures.

=== Casting ===
In November 2025, media outlets reported that Baek Hyun-jin had joined the cast, reuniting with Ji Sung for the first time since The Devil Judge (2021). Ji Sung, Moon So-ri, and Ha Yoon-kyung were reported to be in talks or confirmed for the lead roles shortly thereafter.

== Release ==
The series premiered on JTBC on July 11, 2026, and aired every Saturday and Sunday. It is also available for streaming on Netflix.

== Viewership ==
The Apartment Job : South Korea viewers per episode (millions)

Season	Episode number												Average
Season	1	2	3	4	5	6	7	8	9	10	11	12	Average
1	1.221	1.313	1.390	1.425	0.990	1.250	1.064	1.314	1.103	1.463	1.285	1.882	1.308

Source: Audience measurement performed nationwide by Nielsen Korea.

Average TV viewership ratings
Ep.	Original broadcast date	Average audience share (Nielsen Korea)	
Ep.	Original broadcast date	Nationwide	Seoul
1	July 11, 2026	4.608% (1st)	4.888% (1st)
2	July 12, 2026	5.390% (1st)	5.764% (1st)
3	July 18, 2026	5.383% (1st)	5.577% (1st)
4	July 19, 2026	6.018% (1st)	6.100% (1st)
5	July 25, 2026	4.095% (1st)	3.863% (1st)
6	July 26, 2026	5.160% (1st)	5.181% (1st)
7	August 1, 2026	4.389% (1st)	3.995% (1st)
8	August 2, 2026	5.395% (1st)	5.257% (1st)
9	August 8, 2026	4.651% (1st)	4.557% (1st)
10	August 9, 2026	6.147% (1st)	5.706% (1st)
11	August 15, 2026	5.420% (1st)	5.080% (1st)
12	August 16, 2026	7.675% (1st)	7.262% (1st)
Average		5.361%	5.269%
In the table above, the blue numbers represent the lowest ratings and the red numbers represent the highest ratings.; This drama aired on a cable channel/pay TV which normally has a relatively smaller audience compared to free-to-air TV/public broadcasters (KBS, SBS, MBC, and EBS).
