= Yoon Sang-jeong =

South Korean actress (born 1998)

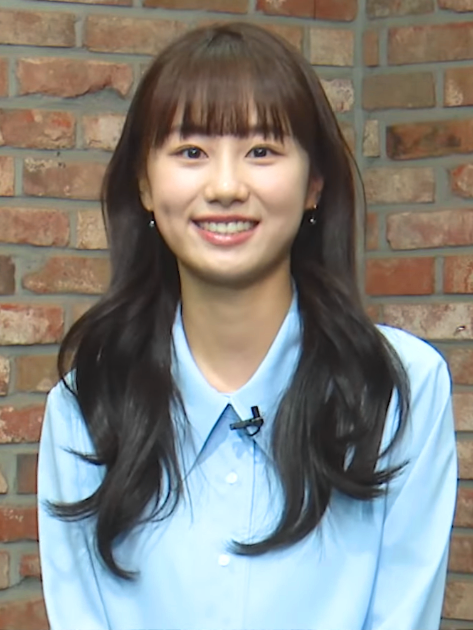
- Yoon in April 2022
- Born: January 17, 1998 (age 28); South Korea
- Occupation: Actress
- Years active: 2014–present
- Agent: NS ENM

Korean name
- Hangul: 윤상정
- RR: Yun Sangjeong
- MR: Yun Sangjŏng

Yoon Sang-jeong (Korean: 윤상정; born January 17, 1998) is a South Korean actress.

== Filmography ==
=== Film ===
Year	Title	Role	Notes	Ref.
2014	Filling 60 hours!			
2018	New Year's Day of Magpie		Short film	
2019	Hello, My Cat	Narae's friend		
2019	Tune in for Love	Yoon Alba		
2019	Her Last Scene	Ji-hyeon		
2026	The Intern	Oh Yun-hee		

=== Television series ===
Year	Title	Role	Ref.
2021	You Are My Spring	Min Ah-ri	
2021	Our Beloved Summer	Ji Ye-in	
2022	Business Proposal	Kim Hye-ji	
2022	Shooting Stars	Chae Eun-soo	
2023	Family: The Unbreakable Bond	Lee Mi-rim	
2023	A Time Called You	Hye-mi	
2025–present	Study Group	Choi Hee-won	
2025	tvN X TVING Short Drama Curation 2025: "Housekeeper"	Han Sang-mi	

=== Web series ===
Year	Title	Role	Ref.
2019	ShortPaper	In-a	
2021	Hidden Writer	Lee Yu-ri	

== Awards and nominations ==
Name of the award ceremony, year presented, category, nominee of the award, and the result of the nomination
Award ceremony	Year	Category	Nominee / Work	Result	Ref.
SBS Drama Awards	2022	Best Supporting Team	Business Proposal	Nominated	
