= Choi Ye-bin =

South Korean actress (born 1998)

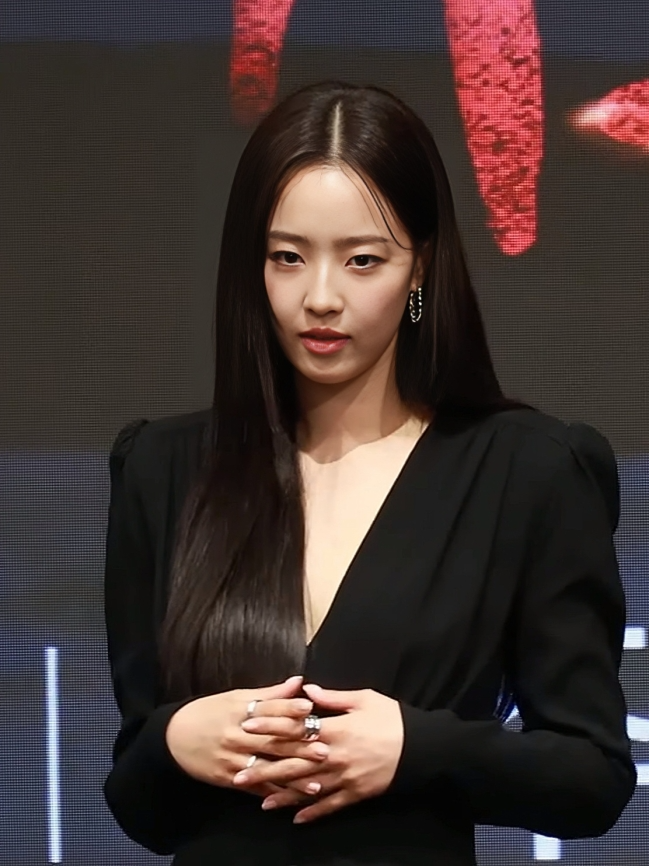
- Choi in August 2024
- Born: September 2, 1998 (age 28); South Korea
- Education: Korea National University of Arts
- Occupation: Actress
- Years active: 2019–present
- Agent(s): J,Wide-Company

Korean name
- Hangul: 최예빈
- RR: Choe Yebin
- MR: Ch'oe Yebin

Choi Ye-bin (Korean: 최예빈, born September 2, 1998) is a South Korean actress. She is best known for role in The Penthouse: War in Life (2020–2021), where she rose to prominence for playing the villainous soprano student Ha Eun-byeol.

== Filmography ==
=== Film ===
Year	Title	Role	Ref.
2019	Voice	Ji-soo	
2019	The Next Station Is Isu	Hee-ah	
2019	Unfamiliar Summer	Ga-ram	
2019	Quitting My Destiny	Seo Eun-jung	
2022	Transaction Complete	Ji-sook	

=== Television series ===
Year	Title	Role	Notes	Ref.
2020–2021	The Penthouse: War in Life	Ha Eun-byeol	Season 1–3	
2022	It's Beautiful Now	Na Yu-na		
2024	Perfect Family	Lee Soo-yeon		
2026	Sword & Silence	Queen Wu Zetian		

=== Web series ===
Year	Title	Role	Ref.
2021	Love & Wish	Son Da-eun	
2023	Night Has Come	Oh Jung-won	

=== Television shows ===
Year	Title	Role	Notes	Ref.
2021	Delicious Rendezvous	Cast member	Episodes 78–90	
2022	Stars' Top Recipe at Fun-Staurant	Special MC	Episode 135–137	

== Theatre ==
Year	Title	Role	Ref.
2019	Almost, Maine	Ginette & Marvalyn	

== Other ventures ==
=== Endorsement ===
In February 2021, she has been chosen as a model for Buckaroo.

== Awards and nominations ==
Name of the award ceremony, year presented, category, nominee of the award, and the result of the nomination
Award ceremony	Year	Category	Nominee / Work	Result	Ref.
SBS Drama Awards	2021	Best New Actress	The Penthouse: War in Life 2 and 3	Won	
