= Han So-eun =

South Korean actress (born 1993)

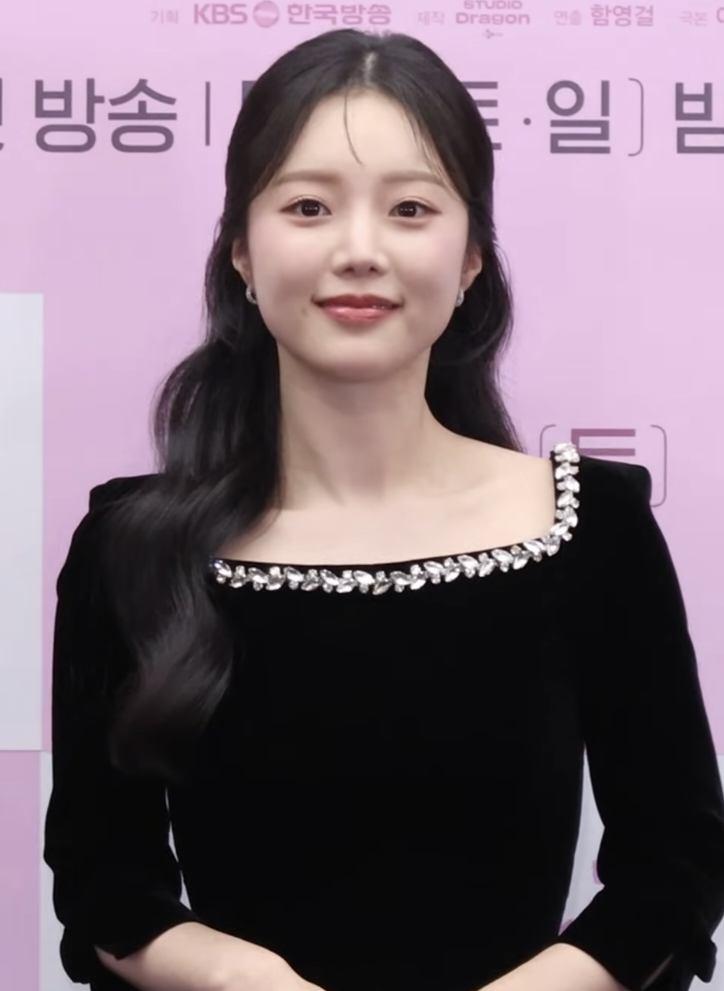
- Han in December 2025
- Born: Park Eun-ji; July 8, 1993 (age 33); Daegu, South Korea
- Education: Dongduk Women's University – Department of Broadcasting and Entertainment
- Occupation: Actress
- Agent: King Kong by Starship

Korean name
- Hangul: 박은지
- Hanja: 朴恩智
- RR: Bak Eunji
- MR: Pak Ŭnji

Stage name
- Hangul: 한소은
- Hanja: 韓韶誾
- RR: Han Soeun
- MR: Han Soŭn

Park Eun-ji (Korean: 박은지; born July 8, 1993), known by her stage name Han So-eun (한소은), is a South Korean actress. She is best known for her role as young Jung Da-jung in 18 Again, Jang Stella in Idol: The Coup, and Shin Hae-rim in To My Beloved Thief (2026).

== Filmography ==
=== Films ===
Year	Title	Role	Notes
2019	By Quantum Physics: A Nightlife Venture	Female Celebrity	Cameo

=== Television series ===
Year	Title	Role	Notes	Ref.
2013	Unemployed Romance	Unknown		
2018	Through the Waves	Park Yoon-ju		
2018	The Beauty Inside	Do Jae's blind date	Cameo (Episode 2)	
2019	Class of Lies	Han Tae-ra		
2020	Mystic Pop-up Bar	Shin Bo-ra	Cameo (Episode 8)	
2020	18 Again	young Jung Da-jung		
2021	Idol: The Coup	Jang Stella		
2022	Becoming Witch	Lim Go-eun		
2023	Joseon Attorney	Kang Eun-soo		
2024	Black Out	Park Da-eun		
2025	The Haunted Palace	Queen Park		
2026	To My Beloved Thief	Shin Hae-rim		

=== Web series ===
Year	Title	Role	Notes	Ref.
2015	The Flatterer	Partner		
2016	Gogh, The Starry Night	Gong Gong-hee		
2018	Between Friendship and Love 3	Jung Ma-eum		
2018	Number Six	Se Ra		
2020	School Strange Stories: 8th Anniversary	Oh Myung-jin		
2021	The Witch's Diner	Kang Su-jeong		
2021	Can You Deliver Time? 2002	Ha Da-yeon		
2023	Gangster's Vlog	Park Yu-na		
