= Lee Jong-hyun (actor, born 1998) =

South Korean actor (born 1998)

- Born: August 1, 1998 (age 28); Goseong, Gangwon, South Korea
- Occupation: Actor
- Years active: 2023–present
- Agent: Goldmedalist
- Height: 1.75 m (5 ft 9 in)
- Website: goldmedalist.com

Lee Jong-hyun (Korean: 이종현; born August 1, 1998) is a South Korean actor. He is best known for his role as Kim Se-hyun in TVING's original series Study Group (2025).

== Early life and education ==
Lee was born on August 1, 1998, in Goseong, Gangwon Province, South Korea.

Lee was a soccer player until middle school. He graduated from high school in the science track.

== Career ==
Lee was cast by Goldmedalist through social media and later signed with the agency. Shortly afterward, he began his mandatory military service, during which the agency awaited his discharge.

In 2023, Lee made a small appearance in Duty After School.

In 2025, Lee officially debuted in the TVING original series, Study Group as Kim Se-hyun.

== Personal life ==
Lee has already completed his mandatory military service.

== Filmography ==
=== Television series ===
Year	Title	Role	Notes	Ref.
2025	Shin's Project	Baek Seung-mu		
2026	The Apartment Job	teen Park Hae-gang		

=== Web series ===
Year	Title	Role	Notes	Ref.
2023	Duty After School	a soldier		
2025	Study Group	Kim Se-hyun		

=== Television shows ===
Year	Title	Role	Notes	Ref.
2025	The Gentlemen's League 4	Cast member		

=== Music video appearances ===
Year	Song title	Artist	Notes	Ref.
2025	"Asadal" (아사달)	Song Ga-in		
