= Doctor on the Edge =

2026 South Korean television series

- Promotional poster
- Hangul: 닥터 섬보이
- RR: Dakteo seomboi
- MR: Takt'ŏ sŏmboi
- Genre: Medical drama; Romance
- Based on: Endurance Doctor by Kim Tae-poong
- Written by: Kim Ji-soo
- Directed by: Lee Myoungwoo
- Starring: Lee Jae-wook; Shin Ye-eun; Hong Min-gi; Lee Soo-kyung; Kim Yoon-woo
- Country of origin: South Korea
- Original language: Korean
- No. of episodes: 12

Production
- Running time: 60 minutes
- Production company: The Studio M

Original release
- Network: ENA; Genie TV
- Release: June 1 – July 7, 2026

Doctor on the Edge (Korean: 닥터 섬보이) is a 2026 South Korean medical romance television series written by Kim Ji-soo, directed by Lee Myoungwoo, and starring Lee Jae-wook, Shin Ye-eun, Hong Min-gi, Lee Soo-kyung, and Kim Yoon-woo. Based on the webtoon Endurance Doctor by Kim Tae-poong, it tells the story of two people who arrive on an isolated island, where unsettling signs begin to appear from the very first day. It aired on ENA from June 1, to July 7, 2026, every Monday and Tuesday at 22:00 (KST). It is also available for streaming on Genie TV in South Korea and on Disney+ internationally.

== Synopsis ==
Do Ji-ui is a plastic surgeon at a university hospital. He resigns to work as a public health doctor, which counts toward his mandatory military service. He hopes to avoid an island posting because of his trauma related to the sea. Unfortunately, he is assigned to work in the remote island village of Pyeongdong-do, an island that every public health doctor would want to avoid. In Pyeongdong-do, he meets Yuk Ha-ri, a nurse who left a mainland university hospital to work at the Pyeondongdo Health Center.

Serving as Pyeongdong-do's public health doctor, Do Ji-ui helps the villagers and discovers compassion through their stories.

== Cast ==
=== Main ===
- Lee Jae-wook as Do Ji-ui

A former plastic surgeon at a university hospital turned into a public health doctor on Pyeondongdo. Haunted by a deep trauma involving the sea, he gradually overcomes his aversion to island life through his work treating the local residents.

- Shin Ye-eun as Yook Ha-ri

A nurse who moved from a university hospital to a public health center. Beneath her gentle demeanor, she hides a secret past and starts to waver after encountering Ji-ui, who shares similar wounds.

- Hong Min-gi as Hyun Chi-yeon

A public health doctor who develops an unspoken rivalry with Ji-ui over Ha-ri.

- Lee Soo-kyung as Uhm Jeong-seon

A Pyeondongdo native working as a nurse in the Oriental Medicine Department.

- Kim Yoon-woo as Yong Joo-cheon

A traditional Korean medicine doctor.

=== Supporting ===
- Jung Ae-yeon as Choi Hyang-mi

Director of the Public Health Center who has survived the harsh realities of the civil service.

- Lee Yoon-mi as Hong Geum-ja, who runs the Imokase Sashimi Restaurant.
- Joo In-young as Hwang Shin-hye

A nurse with 15 years of service at Pyeondongdo Health Center.

- Gil Hae-yeon as Oh Mi-ja

Ha-ri's grandmother.

- Park Jun-seo as an assistant instructor at the Army Training Center where Ji-ui is a trainee.
- Kim Seong-jeong as Ji-woong

=== Special appearances ===
- Lee Seol as Lee Hwa-young

Ji-ui's first love and an emergency medicine specialist.

- Lee Won-jung as Jo Dong-seop

Ha-ri's ex-boyfriend who spread malicious rumors about her.

== Production ==
=== Development ===
Development of Doctor on the Edge started as director Lee Myoungwoo, who helmed The Fiery Priest (2019), One Ordinary Day (2021) and Boyhood (2023), teamed up with KT Studio Genie to adapt Kim Tae-poong's webtoon Endurance Doctor. The production of the series was set to begin in 2024. In September 2025, Kim Ji-soo, writer of Missing Crown Prince (2024) and Pump Up the Healthy Love (2025), was confirmed as screenwriter, with The Studio M producing the series. By early 2026, the production renamed its Korean title from (존버닥터; Jonbeo dakteo) to (닥터 섬보이; Dakteo seomboi), opting for a less vulgar title.

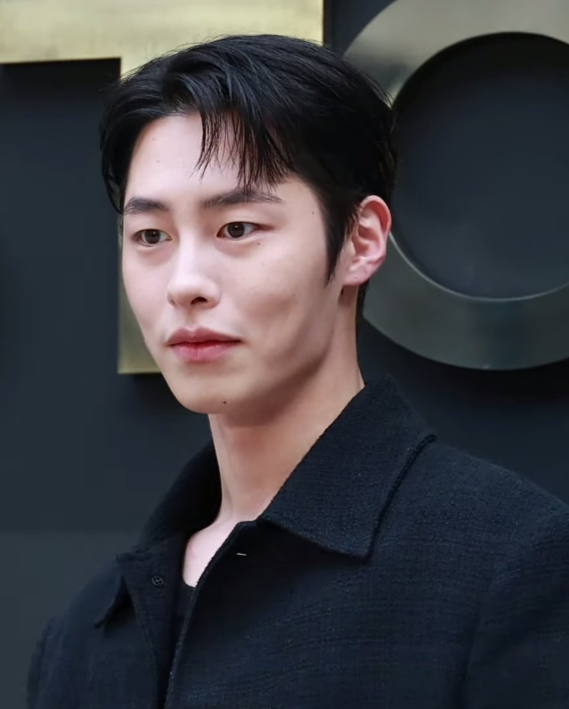
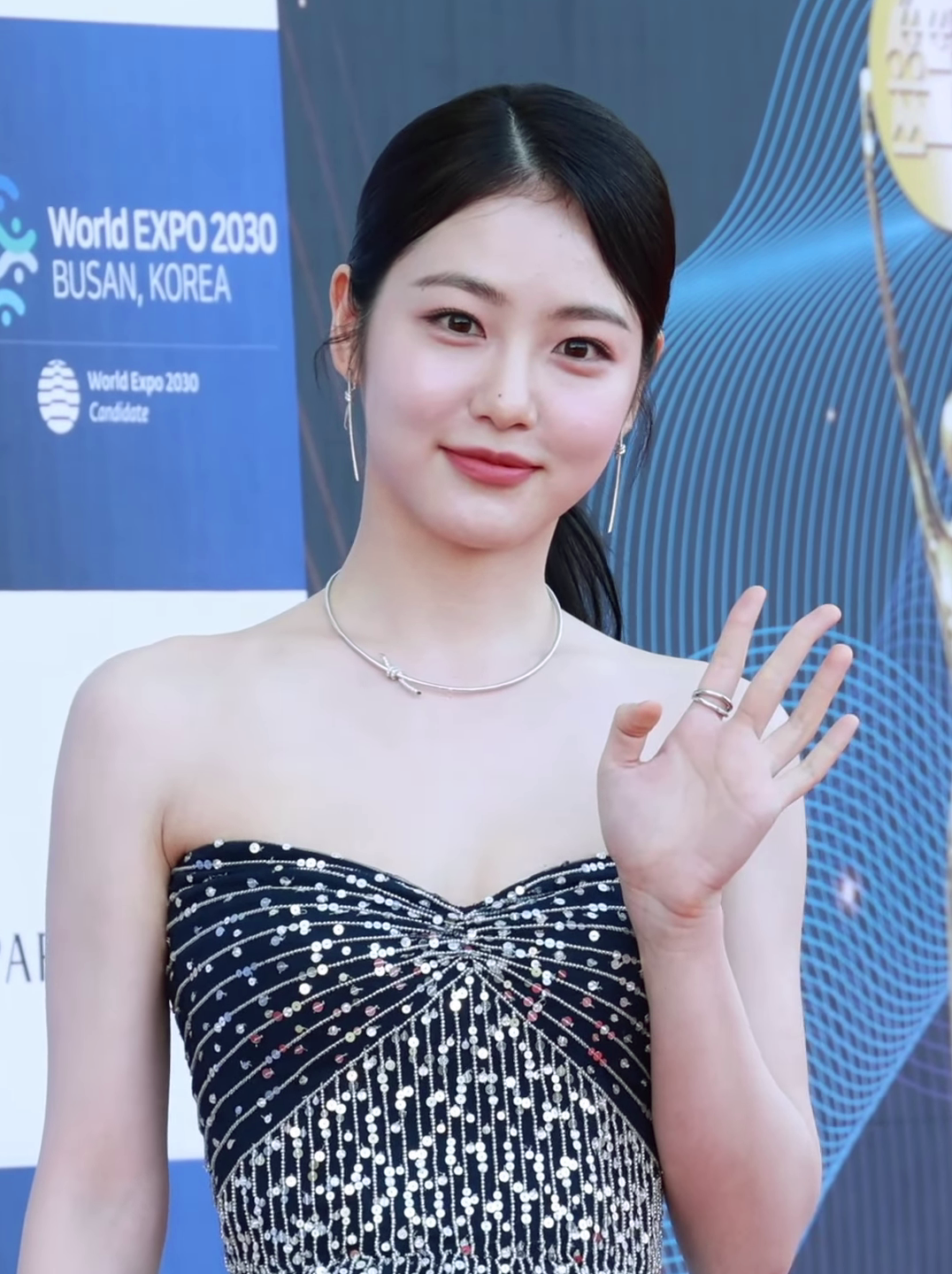
Lee Jae-wook (L) and Shin Ye-eun (R)

=== Casting and filming ===
Casting commenced in March 2025 after Lee Jae-wook's agency confirmed that he had been offered the lead role as doctor Do Ji-ui. Two months later, Shin Ye-eun was reportedly cast as the female lead, Yook Ha-ri, a nurse. Both actors were confirmed as the series leads in September 2025, and principal photography began that month. The project marks Lee's first role as a doctor. The same month, Hong Min-gi, Lee Soo-kyung, and Kim Yoon-woo joined the cast. The Gajo Island (Gajodo) area in Sadeung-myeon, Geoje-si, South Gyeongsang Province, served primarily as the filming location for the series. The production team selected Gajo Island in Geoje for its coastal scenery and fishing village setting.

== Release ==
Doctor on the Edge was reportedly scheduled to premiere on ENA in 2026, and would also be subsequently streaming on Genie TV. By April 2026, the premiere date was confirmed to be on June 1, 2026, airing every Monday and Tuesday at 22:00 (KST). It is also available for streaming on Disney+ internationally.

== Controversy ==
The Studio M, the production company, issued a statement on January 9, 2026, apologizing for issues arising during drama production, thanking staff for their efforts, and acknowledging concerns about filming hours. They stated they would take responsibility and address the issue. The Studio M further stated that they had adjusted schedules and reviewed production methods, but failed to adequately consider filming intensity and staff fatigue. They committed to adhering to a 52-hour filming week going forward and pledged to discuss solutions with staff for past instances exceeding this limit. The Hanbit Media Labor Rights Center reported the previous day that staff on the series had worked more than 52 hours per week.

== Viewership ==
Doctor on the Edge : South Korea viewers per episode (thousands)

Season	Episode number												Average
Season	1	2	3	4	5	6	7	8	9	10	11	12	Average
1	1019	1162	1201	1210	1159	1244	939	1117	1034	1131	1148	1370	1145

Source: Audience measurement performed nationwide by Nielsen Korea.

Average TV viewership ratings
Ep.	Original broadcast date	Average audience share (Nielsen Korea)	
Ep.	Original broadcast date	Nationwide	Seoul
1	June 1, 2026	4.045% (2nd)	3.600% (2nd)
2	June 2, 2026	4.995% (2nd)	5.107% (2nd)
3	June 8, 2026	5.127% (2nd)	4.698% (2nd)
4	June 9, 2026	5.180% (2nd)	4.974% (2nd)
5	June 15, 2026	4.993% (2nd)	5.461% (2nd)
6	June 16, 2026	5.076% (2nd)	4.540% (2nd)
7	June 22, 2026	3.997% (2nd)	3.757% (2nd)
8	June 23, 2026	4.823% (1st)	3.992% (2nd)
9	June 29, 2026	4.468% (2nd)	3.894% (2nd)
10	June 30, 2026	4.780% (1st)	4.618% (2nd)
11	July 6, 2026	4.870% (1st)	4.782% (2nd)
12	July 7, 2026	5.932% (1st)	5.305% (1st)
Average		4.857%	4.561%
In the table above, the blue numbers represent the lowest ratings and the red numbers represent the highest ratings.; This drama aired on a cable channel/pay TV which normally has a relatively smaller audience compared to free-to-air TV/public broadcasters (KBS, SBS, MBC, and EBS).
