= Mun Ikchŏm =

Goryeo politician (1329–1398)

- Hangul: 문익점
- Hanja: 文益漸
- RR: Mun Ikjeom
- MR: Mun Ikchŏm

Art name
- Hangul: 사은, 삼우당
- Hanja: 思隱, 三憂堂
- RR: Saeun, Samudang
- MR: Saŭn, Samudang

Courtesy name
- Hangul: 일신
- Hanja: 日新
- RR: Ilsin
- MR: Ilsin

Posthumous name
- Hangul: 충선
- Hanja: 忠宣
- RR: Chungseon
- MR: Ch'ungsŏn

Mun Ikchŏm (Korean: 문익점; Hanja: 文益漸; March 8, 1329 – July 26, 1398 (Note: In the Korean calendar (lunisolar), he was born on the 8th day of the 2nd month (1329) and died on the 13th day of the 6th Lunar month (1398).)) was a politician and Neo-Confucian scholar of the Goryeo period, who was primarily known for introducing cotton to Korea. His original given name was Ikch'ŏm (익첨; 益瞻), his courtesy name was Ilsin (일신; 日新), and his art names were Saŭn (사은; 思隱) and Samudang (삼우당; 三憂堂).

== History ==
Mun Ikchŏm was born in Gangseong-hyeon, Jinju-mok, Gyeongsang Province (modern day Danseong-myeon, Sancheong County, South Gyeongsang Province) in 1329. His father was Mun Suksŏn, who had passed the civil service examination but did not work for the government. Mun Ikchŏm started working for the government as a historical recorder in 1360. In 1363, he went to Yuan China as a delegation member from Goryeo dynasty. On the way back to Korea he stole cottonseed in his writing brush cap to bring it secretly into Korea. In 1364, he went back to his home town Jinju to spread the seed and successfully grew one of the seeds he had brought back and continued to grow the number of plants significantly. Within ten years, Korea was able to produce cotton and was able to distribute it to the citizens. He died on July 26, 1398.

== Family ==
- Father - Mun Suksŏn (경주 사록 문숙선; 文叔宣)
- Mother - Lady Cho of the Haman Cho clan (함안 조씨; 咸安 趙氏)
- Wives and their issue
  - Lady Chu (주씨) - No issue.
  - Lady Chŏng of the Jinju Chŏng clan (진주 정씨; 晋州 鄭氏); daughter of Chŏng Ch'ŏnik (전객령 치사 정천익)
    - Son - Mun Chungyong (사간원 헌납 문중용; 文中庸)
    - Son - Mun Chungsŏng (한림 문중성; 文中誠)
    - Son - Mun Chungsil (간의대부 문중실; 文中實)
    - Daughter - Lady Mun of the Nampyeong Mun clan (남평 문씨; 南平 文氏)
    - Son - Mun Chungjin (진사 문중진; 文中晉)
    - Daughter - Lady Mun of the Nampyeong Mun clan (남평 문씨; 南平 文氏)
    - Son - Mun Chunggye (상서 문중계; 文中啓)
    - Daughter - Grand Princess Mun of the Nampyeong Mun clan (삼한국대부인 남평 문씨; 南平 文氏); third wife of Grand Prince Wanpung
      - Son-in-law - Yi Wŏn'gye, Grand Prince Wanpung (완풍대군 이원계; 1330–1388); King Taejo's older half-brother

== Works ==
- Samudang silgi (삼우당실기; 三憂堂實記)

== See also ==
- Ch'oe Mu-sŏn
