= Chae Jong-hyeop =

South Korean actor (born 1993)

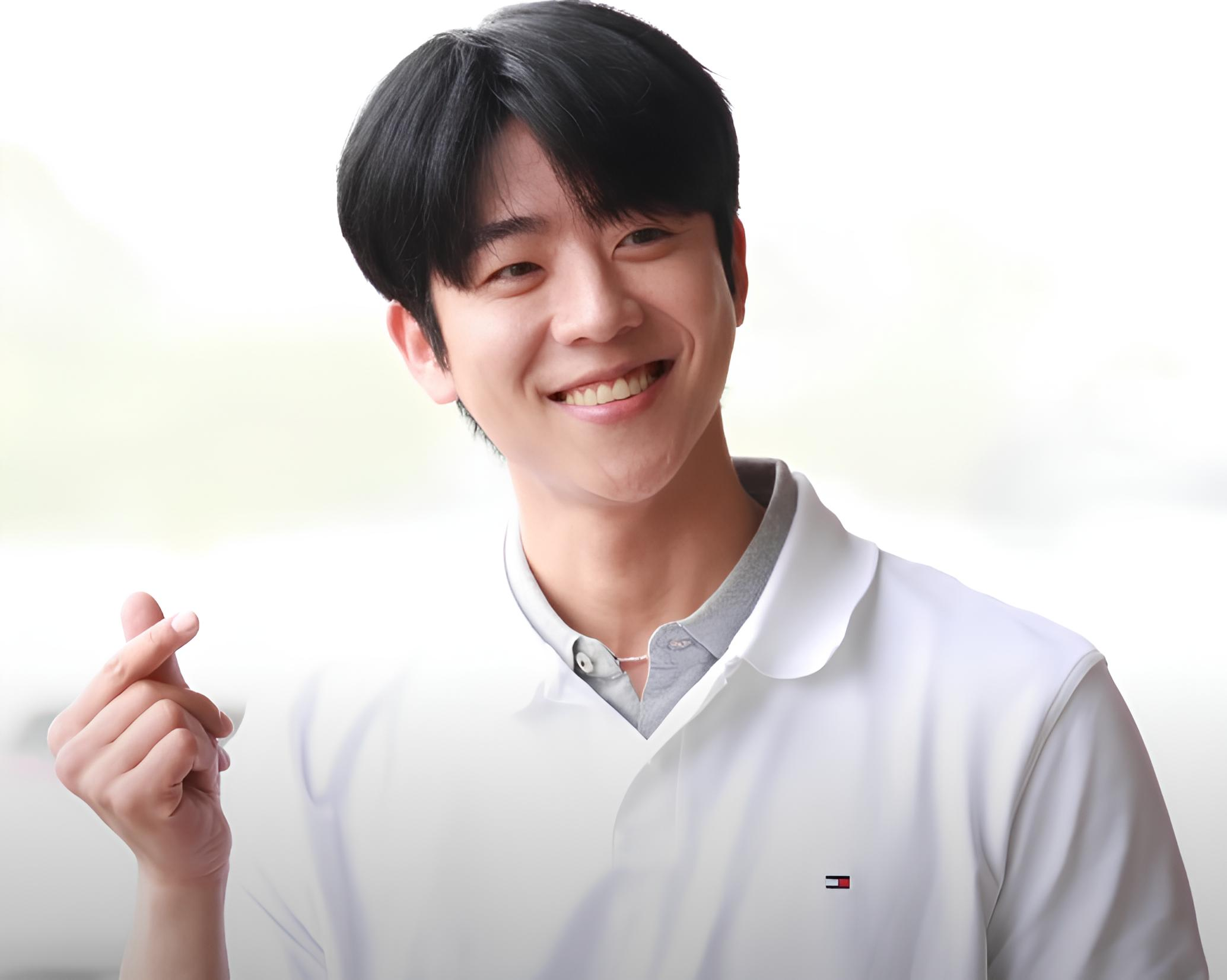
- Chae in 2024
- Born: May 19, 1993 (age 33); Seoul, South Korea
- Education: Seoul Arts College (Fashion Model Art)
- Occupation: Actor
- Years active: 2016–present
- Agent: Blitzway Entertainment

Korean name
- Hangul: 채종협
- RR: Chae Jonghyeop
- MR: Ch'ae Chonghyŏp

Chae Jong-hyeop (Korean: 채종협; born May 19, 1993) is a South Korean actor. He is best known for his leading roles in television dramas The Witch's Diner (2021), Love All Play (2022), Unlock My Boss (2022), Castaway Diva (2023), Serendipity's Embrace (2024), In Your Radiant Season (2026).

== Career ==
Chae made his debut with MBC every1 drama Webtoon Hero - Tundra Show Season 2 which appeared a little. In 2017, Chae made his debut through web dramas Between Friends and No Bad Days. In 2018, Chae joined the web drama No Bad Days Season 2. In 2019, Chae joined the web drama Rumor.

In 2019–2020, Chae made his debut through the SBS successful sport-themed drama Hot Stove League as a baseball pitcher named "Yoo Min-ho". Hot Stove League gained high viewership rating throughout its run, therefore he gained a lot of public recognition through this drama. In April 2021, Chae joined the JTBC drama Sisyphus: The Myth with Cho Seung-woo and Park Shin-hye and brought him attention. Later in June, he appeared in the JTBC drama Nevertheless along with Song Kang and Han So-hee. In July, he appeared in TVING's original drama The Witch's Diner with Song Ji-hyo and Nam Ji-hyun. In 2022, Chae acted in Love All Play and appeared in a cameo appearance in Shooting Stars. In 2022–2023, Chae acted in Unlock My Boss, and Castaway Diva as the lead actor.

In 2026, Chae starred in the MBC TV romance drama In Your Radiant Season opposite Lee Sung-kyung.

== Personal life ==
Chae had resided in South Africa for five years due to his studies.

=== Health and military service ===
In January 2023, Chae was interviewed by the media, saying he was exempt from mandatory military service. Chae was judged to be a 4th-grade supplementary service (social service agent) in his first physical examination and was finally judged to be a 5th-grade wartime worker in a re-examination in 2018. At the time of his re-physical examination, he did an EEG test and explained that he had been diagnosed with epilepsy. As of January 2023, Chae is treating epilepsy by taking medication. He has been taking epilepsy medicine for 10 years.

== Filmography ==
=== Television series ===
Year	Title	Role	Notes	Ref.
2016	Webtoon Hero - Tundra Show 2	King Sejong		
2018	Come and Hug Me	Jung Eui-ah	Cameo	
2019	Rumor	Park Seon-jae		
2019–2020	Hot Stove League	Yoo Min-ho		
2021	Sisyphus: The Myth	Sun / Choi Jae-sun		
2021	Nevertheless	Yang Do-hyeok		
2022	Love All Play	Park Tae-joon		
2022	Shooting Stars	Ham Yoo-jin	Cameo (episode 5)	
2022–2023	Unlock My Boss	Park In-seong		
2023	See You in My 19th Life	Bok-dong	Cameo	
2023	Castaway Diva	Kang Bo-gul		
2024	Eye Love You	Yoon Tae-oh	Japanese drama	
2024	Serendipity's Embrace	Kang Hoo-yeong		
2026	In Your Radiant Season	Sunwoo Chan		
2026	The Vacation Principle	Nishigami	Japanese drama	

=== Web series ===
Year	Title	Role	Notes	Ref.
2017	Between Friends	Moon Do-hyuk		
2017–2018	No Bad Days	Choi Joon-ho	Season 1–2	
2021	The Witch's Diner	Lee Gil-yong		

=== Music video appearances ===
Year	Song title	Artist	Ref.
2022	"Gradation" (그라데이션)	10cm	
2024	"Letter" (시차)	Baek A	
2026	"Golden Hour" (황금기)	BOL4	

== Awards and nominations ==
Name of the award ceremony, year presented, category, nominee of the award, and the result of the nomination
Award ceremony	Year	Category	Nominee / Work	Result	Ref.
Asia Contents Awards & Global OTT Awards	2024	Best Newcomer Actor	Eye Love You	Won	
KBS Drama Awards	2022	Popularity Award, Actor	Love All Play	Nominated	
KBS Drama Awards	2022	Best New Actor	Love All Play	Won	
Korea First Brand Awards	2022	Best New Actor	Chae Jong-hyeop	Won	

=== Honors ===
Name of country or organization, year given, and name of honor or award
Country or Organization	Year	Honor or Award	Ref.
Newsis K-Expo Cultural Awards (Note: Established in 2019 and co-sponsored by Korea's Ministry of Culture, Sports and Tourism, Ministry of Foreign Affairs, Korea Creative Content Agency, Seoul Metropolitan Council and the Seoul Tourism Organization, it awards cultural icons, businesses, and individuals who have contributed greatly to Hallyu, the Korean wave.)	2024	National Assembly Culture, Sports and Tourism Committee Award	

=== Listicles ===
Name of publisher, year listed, name of listicle, and placement
Publisher	Year	Listicle	Placement	Ref.
Moviewalker Press	2024	10 Korean Actors that Movie Writers Recommended in 2024	Top 10	
