= Sisyphus: The Myth =

2021 South Korean television series

- Promotional poster
- Also known as: Sisyphus
- Hangul: 시지프스: the myth
- RR: Sijipeuseu: the myth
- MR: Sijip'ŭsŭ: the myth
- Genre: Science fiction; Thriller; Drama; Action; romance
- Created by: JTBC
- Written by: Lee Je-in; Jeon Chan-ho
- Directed by: Jin Hyuk
- Starring: Cho Seung-woo; Park Shin-hye; Kim Byung-chul; Chae Jong-hyeop
- Composers: Oh Jun-sung (Ep.1~ Ep.8; Chung Ye-kyung (Ep.9~ Ep.16)
- Country of origin: South Korea
- Original language: Korean
- No. of episodes: 16

Production
- Executive producer: Jung Seung-son
- Producer: Park Joon-seo; Park Sang-eok
- Running time: 70 minutes
- Production companies: Drama House; JTBC Studios
- Budget: ₩20–25 billion; (c. US$18–22 million)

Original release
- Network: JTBC
- Release: February 17 – April 8, 2021

Sisyphus: The Myth (Korean: 시지프스: the myth) is a 2021 South Korean television series starring Cho Seung-woo and Park Shin-hye. Labeled as "JTBC's 10th Anniversary Special Drama", it aired on JTBC from February 17 to April 8, 2021; each episode was released on Netflix in South Korea and internationally after its television broadcast every Wednesday and Thursday at 21:00 (KST).

== Synopsis ==
A series of unexplainable events introduces a famous engineer and physicist (Cho Seung-woo) to dangerous secrets and to a beautiful woman (Park Shin-hye) from the future who has come looking for him. Together they must break the time loop to prevent a nuclear war from happening.

== Cast ==
=== Main ===
- Cho Seung-woo as Han Tae-sul
  - Jung Hyeon-jun as young Han Tae-sul

A genius engineer, physicist, CEO and co-founder of the company Quantum and Time. Rude and arrogant at first, Tae-sul later becomes more understanding after meeting Kang Seo-hae. After saving the flight he was on from crashing, he learns of a conspiracy to start a war and realises his brother's apparent death might not have been true.

- Park Shin-hye as Kang Seo-hae
  - Seo Yi-soo as young Kang Seo-hae

A mysterious and beautiful woman from the future intent on saving the war-ravaged world from destruction. Seo-hae is the daughter of Kang Dong-ki. She has lived in a bunker for eight years before coming out to explore and scavenge the war-torn Korea. A battle-hardened elite warrior, she travels to the past to save Tae-sul from death and prevent him from inventing the Uploader, a time machine capable of sending people and things to the past.

=== Supporting ===
- Heo Joon-seok as Han Tae-san
  - Cha Sung-je as young Han Tae-san

Tae-sul's protective older brother who has supposedly died. Tae-san faked his own death to track down Sigma, an enigmatic figure whom he has found out to be Tae-sul's former classmate, an investor who contributed to the rise of Quantum and Time, and the mastermind behind the future war.

- Chae Jong-hyeop as "Sun" / Choi Jae-sun

A former restaurant worker who becomes wealthy with Seo-hae's help. He hopes for romance with Seo-hae but, after being rejected, accepts friendship and treats her like a sister.

==== Quantum and Time ====
- Tae In-ho as Eddie Kim / Kim Seung-bok

Co-CEO of Quantum and Time and Tae-sul's best friend, their friendship drifts apart due to Tae-sul's erratic behavior and Eddie's connection with the financiers taking over Quantum and Time.

- Jung Hye-in as Kim Seo-jin / Kim Agnes

A psychiatrist and daughter of the chairman of Quantum and Time, Kim Han-yong. Seo-jin dated Han Tae-sul before becoming the fiancée of Eddie Kim. She and Eddie would later break up. Like her father, Seo-jin is in league with Sigma. A future version of her, named "Agnes", has crossed over to the present and operates an orphanage for children who came from the future. Agnes is part of the Advance Team.

- Jeon Gook-hwan as Kim Han-yong

The chairman of Quantum and Time and Seo-jin's father, he aids Sigma in exchange for treatment for his wife, who has amyotrophic lateral sclerosis.

- Tae Won-seok as Yeo Bong-sun

Tae-sul's loyal assistant and bodyguard. Bong-sun was left in a vegetative state after the shooting at the Busan Expo. He awakes during the war and learns of Tae-sul's death. He tries to change the future when Seo-hae encounters him on her way to the Uploader.

==== The Control Bureau Team 7 ====
- Choi Jung-woo as Hwang Hyun-seung

The head of the 7th division of Immigration and Foreign Affairs, also known as the Control Bureau. He is a former National Intelligence Service agent.

- Yang Joon-mo as Choi Yeon-sik

A high-ranking agent in the 7th division of the Control Bureau.

- Go Yoon as Jung Hyun-gi

A new recruit to the Control Bureau agent and a former cop. He is lured to work there with the Control Bureau's lies about Seo-hae killing his mother, so that's why he is intent on killing her. He is also a former colleague of Kang Dong-ki.

- Park Young-bin as Kwon Hyuk-bum

An agent in the 7th division of the Control Bureau.

- Lim Ji-sub as Ma Yong-seok

An agent in the 7th division of the Control Bureau.

==== Asia Mart ====
- Sung Dong-il as Park Hyeong-do

A man from the future who runs Asia Mart, a convenience store that secretly works with time-travelers from the future. He is a member of the Advance Team.

- Jung Ha-joon as Uhm Seon-ho
- Lee Myeong-ro as Uhm Seon-jae

Seon-ho and Seon-jae are two young men working for Hyeong-do.

- Lee Si-woo as Lee Ji-eun/Bingbing

Park Hyeong-do's long lost biological daughter from the future. She came to the past ahead of her mother and has been waiting ever since. Her true identity would be revealed to Hyeong-do by Tae-sul.

==== Sigma / Σ ====
- Kim Byung-chul as Sigma / Seo Won-Ju / Seo Gil-Bok

An enigmatic character from the future who has been manipulating current events in his favor. Using his knowledge about certain outcomes, Sigma has amassed a fortune by betting on horse races and trading stocks and options. In the past, he was abused by his father and ended up killing him by using a chemical formula he learned from Tae-sul, who went to the same elementary school as him. Later, Sigma is also known as an amateur painter under the name "Seo Gil-Bok". He tries to put an end to his life because of all the miserable things that he was going through, also believing that no one loved him. Due to his rough childhood and adulthood, he has developed a sense of loneliness and believes that his purpose is to destroy the world. (A possible sign that he may have mental illnesses, such as: Antisocial Personality Disorder and Avoidant Personality Disorder) In the future, he becomes the leader of the Advance Team and the instigator of the nuclear war.

- Lee Jae-won as Kim Dong-hyeon

A fund manager who has helped Sigma develop his investments in the stock market. After witnessing Sigma's predictive ability, Dong-hyeon mimics his client's trades and becomes rich alongside Sigma. He tries to warn Tae-sul about the coming war but is killed before he can do so.

==== Others ====
- Kim Jong-tae as Kang Dong-ki

Seo-hae's father, who teaches her how to survive during the war. He is a veteran Senior Inspector of the National Police Agency and a former colleague of Hyun-gi.

- Lee Yeon-soo as Lee Eun-hee

Seo-hae's mother, who sacrifices herself to save her husband and daughter at the beginning of the war.

- Kim Hee-ryeong as Kim Han-yong's wife

A woman afflicted with amyotrophic lateral sclerosis, her husband and daughter are desperate to cure her by any means necessary, including betraying their friends

- Ha Yu-ri as Choi Go-eun

Choi Jae-sun's sister.

=== Special appearances ===
- Kim Byung-chun as a restaurateur

He is the owner of the Chinese restaurant where Jae-sun works and vows that he would not die of suicide. He is later killed by the Control Bureau, who makes it look like a suicide and causes Jae-sun to doubt the official report.

- Hwang Dong-joo as the co-pilot (Ep. 1–2)

He is the co-pilot of the aircraft that Tae-sul saves, later tortured and killed by the Control Bureau for witnessing things that he is not supposed to know about.

- Sung Byoung-sook as Jung Hyun-gi's mother (Ep. 4)

Jung Hyun-gi's mother who originally passes away from illness while Hyun-gi was imprisoned in the Control Bureau jail. Her death has been blamed on Seo-hae, giving the present Hyun-gi a reason to join the Control Bureau. Hyun-gi would later return from the future to be with her during her final hours.

== Production ==
=== Development ===
In May 2016, Lee Je-in and Jeon Chan-ho signed a contract with Seoul Broadcasting System's Studio S to write a 20-episode television series which could not be broadcast on any other channel. Studio S provided them with a workplace, but the production was eventually cancelled due to the difficulties with finding directors and actors. In December 2018, the duo were put in charge of writing the remaining 16 episodes of Fates & Furies when the previous screenwriter left after 4 episodes. However, Studio S did not pay the ₩60 million writing fees due within 15 days after the conclusion of the series. The duo terminated their contract with Studio S afterward and turned to JTBC for the broadcast of Sisyphus: The Myth. Studio S filed a lawsuit which they lost in November 2020.

=== Casting ===
In late September 2019, JTBC confirmed that Cho Seung-woo and Park Shin-hye would star in Sisyphus: The Myth with Jin Hyuk directing.

=== Filming ===
Principal photography began in May 2020, with Cho Seung-woo joining after completing his role in the second season of Stranger. Filming was completed in early December. Production was temporarily halted in late November 2020 due to the COVID-19 pandemic.

== Original soundtrack ==
Sisyphus: The Myth OST

Soundtrack album by Various artists
- Released: 2021
- Genre: Soundtrack
- Languages: Korean; English
- Labels: Warner Music Korea; JTBC Studio

Part 1

Released on February 17, 2021
No.	Title	Lyrics	Music	Artist	Length
1.	"Stay (tempus) (Prod. GroovyRoom)"	GSoul	GroovyRoom; GSoul	GSoul	3:21
2.	"Stay (tempus) (Prod. GroovyRoom)" (inst.)		GroovyRoom; GSoul		3:21
Total length:					6:42

Part 2

Released on February 24, 2021
No.	Title	Lyrics	Music	Artist	Length
1.	"Fight For Love (Aria for Myth)"	Jin Hyuk; Safira.K	Oh Joon-sung	Sumi Jo	4:21
2.	"Fight For Love (Aria for Myth)" (inst.)		Oh Joon-sung		4:22
Total length:					8:43

Part 3

Released on March 10, 2021
No.	Title	Lyrics	Music	Artist	Length
1.	"My Last Love (In Paradisum)"	Jin Hyuk; Kim Yoo-kyung	Oh Joon-sung	Ailee	4:18
2.	"My Last Love (In Paradisum)" (inst.)		Oh Joon-sung		4:18
Total length:					8:36

Part 4

Released on March 17, 2021
No.	Title	Lyrics	Music	Artist	Length
1.	"You're My Light (Lacrimosa)"	Jin Hyuk; Kim Yoo-kyung	Oh Joon-sung	Park Won	4:29
2.	"You're My Light (Lacrimosa)" (inst.)		Oh Joon-sung		4:29
Total length:					8:58

Part 5

Released on March 24, 2021
No.	Title	Lyrics	Music	Artist	Length
1.	"True (Vertitas)"	DOKO	DOKO	DOKO	2:40
2.	"True (Vertitas)" (inst.)				2:40
Total length:					5:20

== Viewership ==
Sisyphus: The Myth : South Korea viewers per episode (millions)

Season	Episode number																Average
Season	1	2	3	4	5	6	7	8	9	10	11	12	13	14	15	16	Average
1	1.374	1.577	1.419	1.445	1.184	1.190	1.101	1.039	1.114	1.189	1.053	1.085	1.018	1.062	0.807	1.029	1.168

Source: Audience measurement performed nationwide by Nielsen Korea

Average TV viewership ratings
Ep.	Original broadcast date	Average audience share (Nielsen Korea)	
Ep.	Original broadcast date	Nationwide	Seoul
1	February 17, 2021	5.608% (4th)	6.766% (3rd)
2	February 18, 2021	6.677% (4th)	8.063% (3rd)
3	February 24, 2021	6.167% (4th)	6.200% (3rd)
4	February 25, 2021	6.178% (4th)	6.771% (4th)
5	March 3, 2021	5.240% (4th)	6.036% (4th)
6	March 4, 2021	4.972% (5th)	5.620% (4th)
7	March 10, 2021	4.633% (5th)	5.040% (4th)
8	March 11, 2021	4.848% (4th)	5.574% (4th)
9	March 17, 2021	4.905% (4th)	5.372% (4th)
10	March 18, 2021	4.804% (5th)	5.038% (4th)
11	March 24, 2021	4.435% (4th)	4.834% (4th)
12	March 25, 2021	4.637% (4th)	5.160% (4th)
13	March 31, 2021	4.302% (6th)	5.106% (4th)
14	April 1, 2021	4.246% (6th)	4.971% (4th)
15	April 7, 2021	3.394% (9th)	3.925% (5th)
16	April 8, 2021	4.363% (9th)	4.878% (6th)
Average		4.963%	5.585%
In the table above, the blue numbers represent the lowest ratings and the red numbers represent the highest ratings.; This drama airs on a cable channel/pay TV which normally has a relatively smaller audience compared to free-to-air TV/public broadcasters (KBS, SBS, MBC and EBS).

== Reception ==
The show scored 7.2 on IMDb. Pierce Conran, writing in the South China Morning Post, criticized the plot for being internally inconsistent, with different rules about time travel added only to be broken later, undermining other elements of the show.
