= Lim Ji-sub =

South Korean actor (born 1998)

- Born: 12 November 1998 (age 27); South Korea
- Education: Chung-Ang University
- Occupation: Actor
- Years active: 2019–present
- Agent: Fantagio

Korean name
- Hangul: 임지섭
- RR: Im Jiseop
- MR: Im Chisŏp
- Website: fantagio.kr/actors/임지섭/

Lim Ji-sub (Korean: 임지섭; born 12 November 1998) is a South Korean actor under Fantagio. He debuted as an actor in the web series Do With All Your Heart Today (2019), and made his musical debut in Dear Evan Hansen (2024). He is best known for his roles in the BL film The Eighth Sense (2023) and TVING series Study Group (2025). He has made short appearances in several works, such as Love Revolution as Cho Seung-min and Sisyphus: The Myth as Ma Young-seok.

== Early life and education ==
Lim was born on 12 November 1998. He graduated from Hanlim Multi Art School with a degree in fashion modeling, then pursued a university degree in modeling and acting. He eventually dropped out to focus on preparing for entrance exams on his own. He later entered Chung-Ang University, majoring in Musical Theatre.

== Career ==
Lim made his acting debut in the web series Do With All Your Heart Today as Jung Tae-jun in 2019. He then appeared in the music video for Radio Nine's song 'Bad Love', a collaboration with Na Yoon-kwon. He portrayed a man who is struggling to move on from his ex-girlfriend, trapped in a toxic relationship. In 2020, Lim was starring in the web series Successful Geek as Park Dong-sun. In 2021, Lim appeared as the lead in TVING's mystery fantasy romance web film 3.5th Period. In 2023, Lim starred in the BL film The Eighth Sense as Jaewon. In 2024, Lim made his musical debut in Dear Evan Hansen as Connor Murphy, which was held at Chungmu Art Center Grand Theater from March 28, to 23 June 2024. In 2025, he joined the cast of TVING's action-comedy drama Study Group as Anti.

== Filmography ==
=== Film ===
Year	Title	Role	Ref.
2021	3.5th Period	Kang Da-won	
2022	Project Wolf Hunting	Unknown	
2023	The Eighth Sense	Seo Jae-won	

=== Television series ===
Year	Title	Role	Ref.
2023	Sisyphus: The Myth	Ma Young-seok	
2024	Wonderful World	Kwon Min-hyuk	
2024	The Midnight Studio	Unknown	
2025	Study Group	Anti	

=== Web series ===
Year	Title	Role	Ref.
2019	Do With All Your Heart Today	Jung Tae-jun	
2020	Love Revolution	Cho Seung-min	
2020	A Successful Geek	Park Dong-sun	

=== Music video appearances ===
Year	Title	Artist	Ref.
2019	그런 사랑하지 말아요 (Bad Love)	Radio9 (with Na Yoon-kwon)	

== Theater ==
Musical play performances
Year	Title	Role	Ref.
2024	Dear Evan Hansen	Connor Murphy	

== Awards and nominations ==
Name of the award ceremony, year presented, category, nominee of the award, and the result of the nomination
Award ceremony	Year	Category	Nominee / Work	Result	Ref.
Korea Musical Awards	2025	Rookie of the Year	Dear Evan Hansen	Nominated	
