= Unlock My Boss =

2022 South Korean television series

- Promotional poster
- Also known as: Unlock the CEO
- Hangul: 사장님을 잠금해제
- Lit.: Unlock the Boss
- RR: Sajangnimeul jamgeumhaeje
- MR: Sajangnimŭl chamgŭmhaeje
- Genre: Fantasy; Comedy; Thriller
- Based on: Unlock the Boss by Park Seong-hyun
- Written by: Kim Hyung-min
- Directed by: Lee Cheol-ha
- Starring: Chae Jong-hyeop; Seo Eun-soo; Park Sung-woong
- Music by: Kim Ji-ae
- Country of origin: South Korea
- Original language: Korean
- No. of episodes: 12

Production
- Executive producers: Kim Hyun-jung; Kim Hyun-cheol (CP); Lee Hee-won (CP)
- Producers: Han Seok-won; Kwon Mi-kyung
- Running time: 60 minutes
- Production companies: High Zium Studio; Studio N

Original release
- Network: ENA
- Release: December 7, 2022 – January 12, 2023

Unlock My Boss (Korean: 사장님을 잠금해제) is a South Korean television series starring Chae Jong-hyeop, Seo Eun-soo, and Park Sung-woong. It is based on a webtoon of the same Korean title by writer Park Seong-hyun, which was serialized on Naver. It aired on ENA from December 7, 2022 to January 12, 2023, every Wednesday and Thursday at 21:00 (KST). It is also available for streaming on TVING in South Korea, and on Netflix in selected regions.

== Synopsis ==
The series is about a company president who gets trapped in a smartphone due to a suspicious incident, and an unemployed young man whose life changes after picking up the strange smartphone.

== Cast ==
=== Main ===
- Chae Jong-hyeop as Park In-seong: a job-seeker who is majored in acting, and has lived a hard life, but still has not accomplished anything
- Seo Eun-soo as Jung Se-yeon: a robot-like secretary who becomes In-seong's strongest ally
- Park Sung-woong as Kim Seon-joo: president of Silver Lining, an emerging IT company

=== Supporting ===
- Lee Sang-hee as Oh Mi-ran: executive director of Beomyoung Group, the largest domestic market capitalization company
- Kim Sung-oh as Ma-pi/Jang Ju-seong: a loan shark
- Jung Dong-hwan as Oh Young-geun: vice chairman of Beomyoung Group
- Kim Byeong-chun as Kwak Sam-soo: a managing director at Silver Lining
- Ki So-yu as Kim Min-ah: Seon-joo's daughter
- Heo Ji-na as Jung Ji-hye: Seon-joo's live-in housekeeper

=== Extended ===
- Ahn Nae-sang as Park Jae-chun: In-seong's father
- Kim Young-sun as Choi Soo-jin: In-seong's mother
- Yoon Byung-hee as Jung Hyeon-ho: In-seong's best friend
- Choi Jin-ho as Shim Seung-bo: Seon-joo's butler
- Bang Joo-hwan as Noh Wi-je: a secretary and bodyguard
- Byun Jun-seo as Nam Sang-won: a team leader at Silver Lining
- Han Ji-sang as Choi Seong-jun: a veteran detective
- Jung Hee-tae as Managing Director Kim: a managing director at Silver Lining

=== Special appearances ===
- Jo Jae-yoon
- Jang Hang-jun
- Im Chul-soo

== Release ==
The series was initially scheduled to premiere on November 30, 2022, but was pushed back to December 7.

== Viewership ==
Unlock My Boss : South Korea viewers per episode (thousands)

Season	Episode number											
Season	1	2	3	4	5	6	7	8	9	10	11	12
1	208	N/A	241	286	248	292	N/A	297	217	305	292	271

Source: Audience measurement performed nationwide by Nielsen Korea.

Average TV viewership ratings
Ep.	Original broadcast date	Average audience share (Nielsen Korea)	
Ep.	Original broadcast date	Nationwide	Seoul
1	December 7, 2022	1.096% (10th)	1.523% (3rd)
2	December 8, 2022	0.858% (25th)	N/A
3	December 14, 2022	1.139% (12th)	1.383% (8th)
4	December 15, 2022	1.198% (10th)	1.211% (9th)
5	December 21, 2022	1.078% (22nd)	N/A
6	December 22, 2022	1.215% (13th)	N/A
7	December 28, 2022	0.981% (20th)	N/A
8	December 29, 2022	1.298% (8th)	1.451% (3rd)
9	January 4, 2023	1.136% (8th)	1.289% (7th)
10	January 5, 2023	1.397% (5th)	1.352% (6th)
11	January 11, 2023	1.416% (6th)	1.503% (5th)
12	January 12, 2023	1.450% (5th)	1.552% (6th)
In the table above, the blue numbers represent the lowest published ratings and the red numbers represent the highest published ratings.; N/A denotes rating that was not released.; This series aired on a cable channel/pay TV which normally has a relatively smaller audience compared to free-to-air TV/public broadcasters (KBS, SBS, MBC and EBS).
