= The Witch's Diner =

2021 South Korean web series

- Promotional poster
- Hangul: 마녀식당으로 오세요
- Lit.: Come to the Witch's Restaurant
- RR: Manyeo sikdangeuro oseyo
- MR: Manyŏ siktangŭro oseyo
- Genre: Dark fantasy
- Based on: The Witch's Diner by Goo Sang-hee
- Written by: Lee Young-sook
- Directed by: So Jae-hyun
- Starring: Song Ji-hyo; Nam Ji-hyun; Chae Jong-hyeop
- Composer: Heo Seong-jin
- Country of origin: South Korea
- Original language: Korean
- No. of episodes: 8

Production
- Executive producer: Oh Jae-hyeon
- Producers: Yang Gwang-deok; Oh Seul-gi; Kim Gyeo-re
- Running time: 37–55 minutes
- Production companies: Studio Dragon; Apollon Studio

Original release
- Network: TVING
- Release: July 16 – August 13, 2021

The Witch's Diner (Korean: 마녀식당으로 오세요) is a South Korean streaming television series starring Song Ji-hyo, Nam Ji-hyun, and Chae Jong-hyeop. It aired on TVING from July 16 to August 13, 2021, every Friday at 16:00 (KST) for 8 episodes.

The series aired on television network tvN from January 5–19, 2022, every Wednesday and Thursday at 22:30 (KST) for 5 episodes.

== Synopsis ==
The Witch's Diner tells the story of desperate people who come to dine at the restaurant operated by the witch Jo Hee-ra (Song Ji-hyo), hoping to get their wishes fulfilled through a special meal. In exchange, they have to sacrifice the most precious thing in their life.

== Cast ==
=== Main ===
- Song Ji-hyo as Jo Hee-ra

A witch and the owner of a restaurant that sells food that makes people's wishes come true in return of their soul or other things that she wish from her customer. After meeting Jeong Jin and fulfilling her wishes, she took over the restaurant as exchange for fulfilling Jin's revenge wish.

- Nam Ji-hyun as Jeong Jin

An employee at Jo Hee-ra's restaurant. Jo Hee-ra came to her life after she hit the rock bottom of her life (being fired from her job, being dumped by her boyfriend, being scammed by a neighbor and her mother left her to take care of her ill father in a sanatorium). She let Jo Hee-ra use her bankrupted restaurant in exchange of a revenge wish against her neighbor.

- Chae Jong-hyeop as Lee Gil-yong

A high school student during daytime and a part-time employee at Jo Hee-ra's restaurant during night-time.

=== Supporting ===
- Ha Do-kwon as CEO Oh

Assistant of Jo Hee-ra. He helps to take care of the real world matters such as bills, taxes, etc. He is also in charge of designing the restaurant interior that Hee-ra took over from Jeong Jin.

- Yoon Da-young as Lee Yoon-mi

Best friend of Jeong Jin and teacher of Lee Gil-yong.

- So Hee-jung as Seo Ae-sook

Jeong Jin's mother.

- Son Kwang-eob as Lee Man-gap

Lee Gil-yong's father.

- Shin Joo-hyeop as Young-jae

Lee Gil-yong's classmate at high school and the person who influenced Gil-yong's life.

- Han So-eun as Kang Su-jeong

A friend of the same class as Gil-yong who tries to live up to her parents' expectations. Her father is a high-ranking official and her mother is a university professor.

- Baek Sung-chul as Ko Hyun-woo

A bully at Lee Gil-yong's class who torments both Gil-yong and Young-jae.

- Ji Soo-won as Park Seon

Great witch. The descendants of witches from generation to generation.

=== Special appearances ===
- Lee Kyu-hyung as Jo Hee-ra's last guest (Ep. 1)
- Ahn Eun-jin as Jin Sun-mi
- Kang Ki-doong as Bae Yoon-ki

A desperate job-seeker who came to the restaurant, he is willing to do anything to find a job.

- Kang Da-hyun as Ga-young

A musical actress.

- Yoon Ji-on as Ahn Seong-ho

Jin Sun-mi's boyfriend.

- Lee Joo-sil as Lee Bok-nan

Landlord of Lee Gil-yong's house.

- Im Won-hee as Goo Hyo-sik

Son of Lee Bok-nan.

- Han Ji-eun as Book Writer

Writer of The Witch's Diner. A desperate writer that need a new ideas for her new book in order to meet the deadline provided by the publisher.

== Original soundtrack ==
=== Part 1 ===
Released on July 17, 2021
No.	Title	Lyrics	Music	Artist	Length
1.	"Holding On"	Se.A	Heo Seong-jin; Se.A	Se.A	3:29
2.	"Holding On" (Inst.)		Heo Seong-jin; Se.A	Se.A	3:29
Total length:					6:58

=== Part 2 ===
Released on July 24, 2021
No.	Title	Lyrics	Music	Artist	Length
1.	"Alone"	Junny	Heo Seong-jin; Junny; Dunk	Junny	3:46
2.	"Alone" (Inst.)		Heo Seong-jin; Junny; Dunk	Junny	3:46
Total length:					7:32

=== Part 3 ===
Released on July 31, 2021
No.	Title	Lyrics	Music	Artist	Length
1.	"Fair Dish"	Yeseo	D.Ori (디오리); Lee So-won	Yeseo	3:01
2.	"Fair Dish" (Inst.)		D.Ori (디오리); Lee So-won	Yeseo	3:01
Total length:					6:02

=== Part 4 ===
Released on August 7, 2021
No.	Title	Lyrics	Music	Artist	Length
1.	"Please"	Summer Kim (CLEF); BenAddict (CLEF); CLEF CREW	Park Won-jun (CLEF); WDLM (CLEF); BenAddict (CLEF); CLEF CREW	Han Seung-woo (Victon)	3:31
2.	"Please" (Inst.)		Park Won-jun (CLEF); WDLM (CLEF); BenAddict (CLEF); CLEF CREW	Han Seung-woo (Victon)	3:31
Total length:					7:02

=== Part 5 ===
Released on August 21, 2021
No.	Title	Lyrics	Music	Artist	Length
1.	"By Your Side" (그런 사람)	Heo Seong-jin	Heo Seong-jin; Dunk	Sondia	3:45
2.	"By Your Side" (그런 사람; Inst.)		Heo Seong-jin; Dunk	Sondia	3:45
Total length:					7:30

== Viewership ==
The Witch's Diner : South Korea viewers per episode (thousands)

Season	Episode number					Average
Season	1	2	3	4	5	Average
1	491	469	521	528	461	494

Source: Audience measurement performed nationwide by Nielsen Korea.

Average TV viewership ratings
Ep.	Original broadcast date	Average audience share (Nielsen Korea)	
Ep.	Original broadcast date	Nationwide	Seoul
1	January 5, 2022	2.282% (4th)	2.960% (2nd)
2	January 6, 2022	1.982% (5th)	2.389% (3rd)
3	January 12, 2022	2.289% (2nd)	3.023% (2nd)
4	January 13, 2022	2.095% (2nd)	2.281% (2nd)
5	January 19, 2022	1.767% (4th)	2.002% (3rd)
Average		2.083%	2.531%
In the table above, the blue numbers represent the lowest ratings and the red numbers represent the highest ratings.; This television series airs on a cable channel/pay TV which normally has a relatively smaller audience compared to free-to-air TV/public broadcasters (KBS, SBS, MBC and EBS).
