= Daewonsa =

Buddhist temple in South Korea

- 대원사
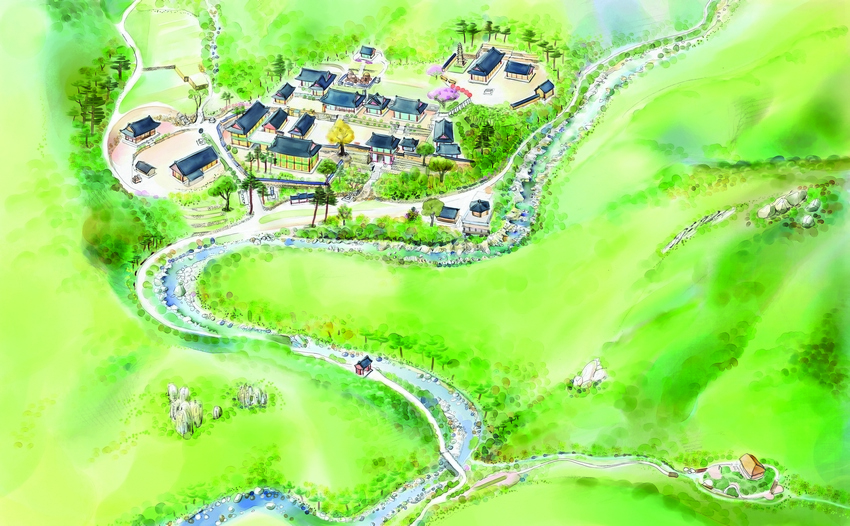
- Daewonsa Temple in South Korea

- Location within South Korea

Religion
- Affiliation: Jogye Order of Korean Buddhism

Location
- Location: 453 Pyeongchon-upyeongro Samjang-myeon Sancheong-gun South Gyeongsang Province (Korean: 경상남도 산청군 삼장면 평촌유평로 453)
- Country: South Korea
- Coordinates: 35°21′18.0″N 127°48′24.8″E

Daewonsa (Korean: 대원사; Hanja: 大源寺) is a Buddhist temple of the Jogye Order in South Gyeongsang Province, South Korea.

== History ==
Daewonsa was established in 548 by Patriarch Ven. Yeongi. Originally named Pyeongwonsa Temple, it was reduced to ashes during the Japanese invasion (1592–1597) but reconstructed in 1685 and renamed Daewonam Hermitage. It was again rebuilt in 1890 and renamed Daewonsa. In 1948, during the Yeosun Rebellion, the temple was burned to the ground by government forces. In September 1955, Ven. Beobil, a Buddhist nun, took office as its head, and launched its reconstruction, eventually completing the temple we see today.

== Landscape ==
Nestled deep in an eastern fold of Mt. Jirisan, Daewonsa is occupied by Buddhist nuns. Sarijeon Hall has a stone pagoda standing in front of it and it is where many nuns practice intensive Seon meditation during the annual three-month summer and winter retreats.

The temple is surrounded by large amounts of natural scenery. A mountain stream runs through the 2-kilometre (1.2 mi) valley that extends from the parking lot at the temple entrance to the temple compound. The path to the entrance is lined with tall, straight pines called “diamond pines.”

== Cultural properties ==
The Multi-Story Stone Pagoda (Treasure No. 1112) enshrines the Buddha's relics which Vinaya Master Jajang Yulsa brought from China. During the Joseon era, the pagoda was repaired twice, in 1724 by Seon Master Taeheum, and in 1784 by Seon Master Ogin. It was then that 72 relics (sarira) were found. In the most recent renovation, the relics were divided and enshrined in the pagoda's 3rd, 5th and 7th stories.

Other cultural objects include: a Painting of Buddhist Guardian Deities (Tangible Cultural Heritage of South Gyeongsang Province No. 361) and Banja (suspended gong; Tangible Cultural Heritage of South Gyeongsang Province No. 362). In addition, the temple itself is designated Traditional Temple No. 81, and the valley is Regional Cultural Heritage No. 114.

== Gallery ==
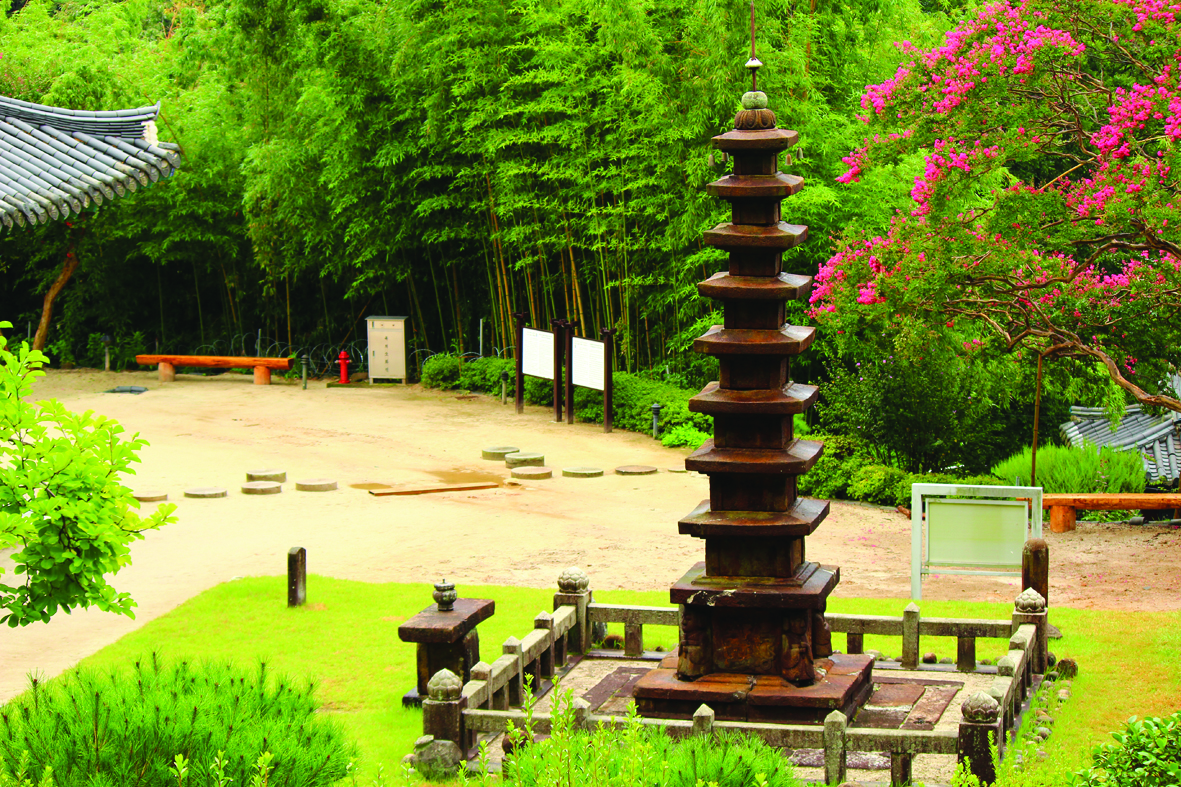

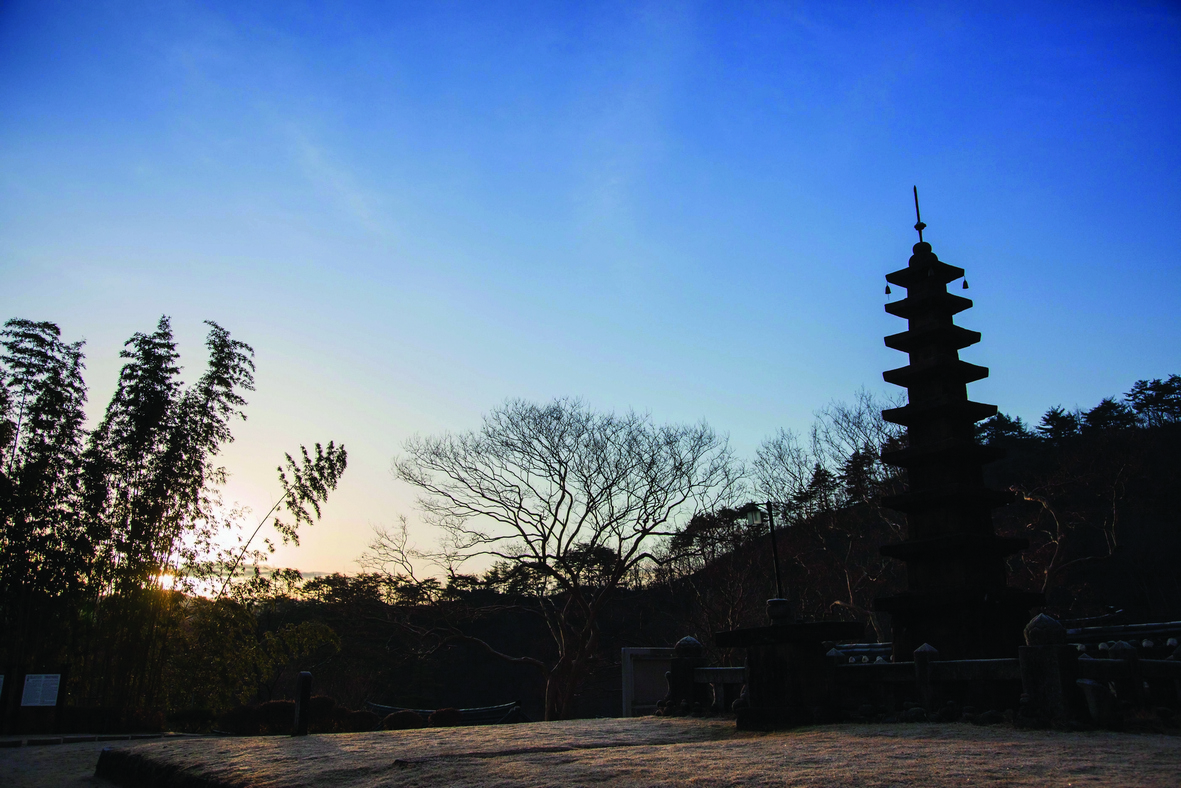

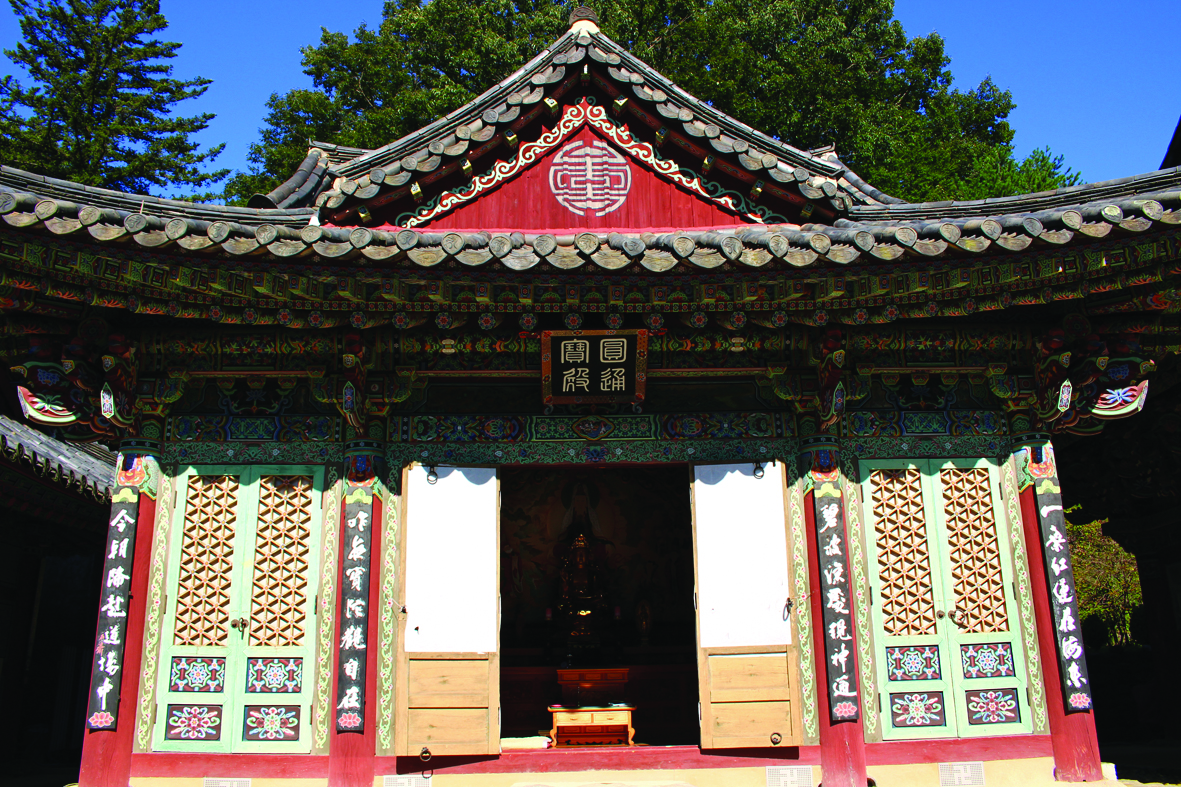
