= Hwangmaesan =

Mountain in South Korea

Coordinates: 35°29′47″N 127°58′28″E

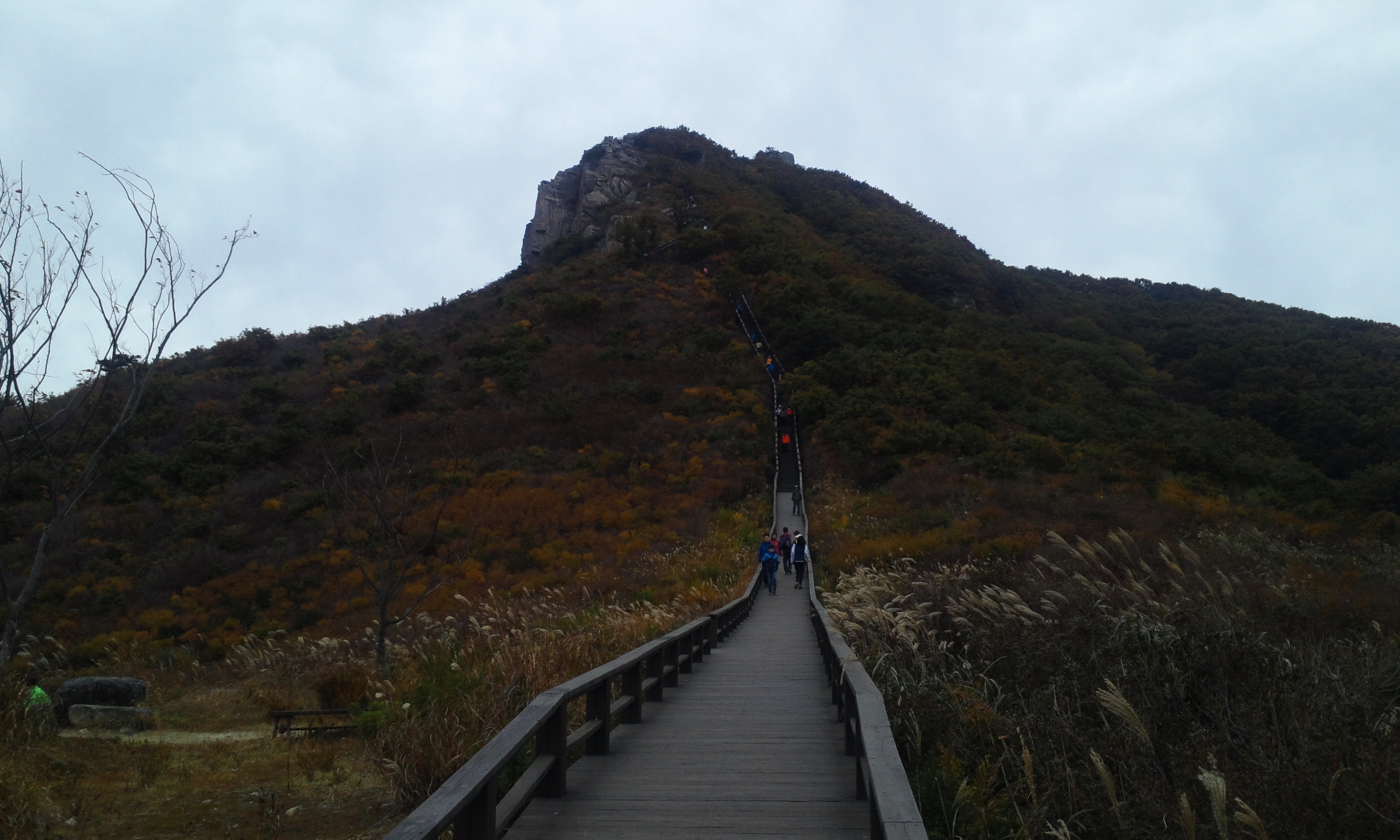
- Hwangmaesan in autumn, 2014

Highest point
- Elevation: 1,108 m (3,635 ft)

Geography
- Location: South Gyeongsang Province, South Korea

Hwangmaesan is a mountain of South Gyeongsang Province, southeastern South Korea. It has an elevation of 1,108 metres.

== See also ==
- List of mountains of Korea
