= 2025 in South Korean television =

This is a non-comprehensive list of Television in South Korea related events from 2025.

== New series and returning shows ==
| Title | Channel/Platform | First Aired | Last Aired | Status | Ref. |
|---|---|---|---|---|---|
| Love Scout | SBS TV | January 3 | February 14 | Ended | |
| When the Stars Gossip | tvN | January 4 | February 23 | Ended | |
| The Queen Who Crowns | TVING/tvN | January 6 | February 11 | Ended | |
| Motel California | MBC TV | January 10 | February 15 | Ended | |
| Unmasked | Disney+ | January 15 | February 19 | Ended | |
| FC Soldout | iQIYI | January 17 | March 7 | Ended | |
| Study Group | TVING | January 23 | February 20 | Renewed | |
| The Trauma Code: Heroes on Call | Netflix | January 24 | | Ended | |
| For Eagle Brothers | KBS2 | February 1 | August 3 | Ended | |
| Kick Kick Kick Kick | KBS2 | February 5 | March 13 | Ended | |
| Heart Stain | Heavenly | February 6 | February 27 | Ended | |
| The Scandal of Chunhwa | TVING | February 6 | March 6 | Ended | |
| Newtopia | Coupang Play | February 7 | March 21 | Ended | |
| Friendly Rivalry | U+ Mobile TV | February 10 | March 6 | Ended | |
| Our Chocolate Moments | SBS TV | February 11 | February 12 | Ended | |
| Melo Movie | Netflix | February 14 | | Ended | |
| The Witch | Channel A | February 15 | March 16 | Ended | |
| My Dearest Nemesis | tvN | February 17 | March 24 | Ended | |
| Buried Hearts | SBS TV | February 21 | April 12 | Ended | |
| Undercover High School | MBC TV | February 21 | March 29 | Ended | |
| History of Scruffiness | Wavve | February 26 | March 19 | Ended | |
| Secret Relationships | Watcha | February 27 | March 21 | Ended | |
| The Potato Lab | tvN | March 1 | April 6 | Ended | |
| Mother and Mom | Genie TV/ENA | March 3 | March 25 | Ended | |
| When Life Gives You Tangerines | Netflix | March 7 | March 28 | Ended | |
| The Art of Negotiation | JTBC | March 8 | April 13 | Ended | |
| Hyper Knife | Disney+ | March 19 | April 9 | Ended | |
| Villains Everywhere | KBS2 | March 19 | April 24 | Ended | |
| Heo's Diner | MBN+ | March 24 | April 22 | Ended | |
| Heesu in Class 2 | Heavenly | March 28 | April 26 | Ended | |
| The Divorce Insurance | tvN | March 31 | May 6 | Ended | |
| Business as Usual | Heavenly | April 3 | May 8 | Ended | |
| Way Back Love | TVING | April 3 | April 17 | Ended | |
| Karma | Netflix | April 4 | | Ended | |
| New Recruit 3 | Genie TV/ENA | April 7 | April 29 | Ended | |
| Crushology 101 | MBC TV | April 11 | May 17 | Ended | |
| Resident Playbook | tvN | April 12 | May 18 | Ended | |
| Good Luck! | KBS1 | April 14 | October 3 | Ended | |
| Something Is Not Right | Heavenly | April 16 | May 8 | Ended | |
| First Love | U+ Mobile TV | April 18 | May 23 | Ended | |
| The Haunted Palace | SBS TV | April 18 | June 7 | Ended | |
| Heavenly Ever After | JTBC | April 19 | May 25 | Ended | |
| Weak Hero Class 2 | Netflix | April 25 | | Ended | |
| Queen's House | KBS2 | April 28 | September 19 | Ended | |
| Pump Up the Healthy Love | KBS2 | April 30 | June 5 | Ended | |
| Spring of Youth | SBS TV | May 6 | July 2 | Ended | |
| Second Shot at Love | tvN | May 12 | June 17 | Ended | |
| Tastefully Yours | Genie TV/ENA | May 12 | June 10 | Ended | |
| Shark: The Storm | TVING | May 15 | | Ended | |
| Dear Hongrang | Netflix | May 16 | | Ended | |
| Nine Puzzles | Disney+ | May 21 | June 4 | Ended | |
| A Head Coach's Turnover | MBC TV | May 23 | May 24 | Ended | |
| Our Unwritten Seoul | tvN | May 24 | June 29 | Ended | |
| Oh My Ghost Clients | MBC TV | May 30 | June 28 | Ended | |
| One: High School Heroes | Wavve | May 30 | June 13 | Ended | |
| Good Boy | JTBC | May 31 | July 20 | Ended | |
| Ball Boy Tactics | Heavenly | June 5 | June 26 | Ended | |
| Mercy for None | Netflix | June 6 | | Ended | |
| The Woman Who Swallowed the Sun | MBC TV | June 9 | December 12 | Ended | |
| The First Night with the Duke | KBS2 | June 11 | July 17 | Ended | |
| Our Movie | SBS TV | June 13 | July 19 | Ended | |
| Hunter with a Scalpel | U+tv/U+ Mobile TV | June 16 | July 10 | Ended | |
| Salon de Holmes | Genie TV/ENA | June 16 | July 15 | Ended | |
| I Am a Running Mate | TVING | June 19 | | Ended | |
| Head over Heels | tvN | June 23 | July 29 | Ended | |
| Squid Game 3 | Netflix | June 27 | | Ended | |
| Bitch x Rich 2 | Wavve | July 3 | August 1 | Ended | |
| Law and the City | tvN | July 5 | August 10 | Ended | |
| S Line | Wavve | July 11 | July 25 | Ended | |
| Low Life | Disney+ | July 16 | August 13 | Ended | |
| The Nice Guy | JTBC | July 18 | August 29 | Ended | |
| The Defects | Genie TV/ENA | July 21 | August 12 | Ended | |
| My Girlfriend Is the Man! | KBS2 | July 23 | August 28 | Ended | |
| Trigger | Netflix | July 25 | | Ended | |
| The Winning Try | SBS TV | July 25 | August 30 | Ended | |
| Mary Kills People | MBC TV | August 1 | September 12 | Ended | |
| Beyond the Bar | JTBC | August 2 | September 7 | Renewed | |
| My Lovely Journey | Channel A | August 2 | August 31 | Ended | |
| Love, Take Two | tvN | August 4 | September 9 | Ended | |
| Our Golden Days | KBS2 | August 9 | January 25, 2026 | Ended | |
| My Troublesome Star | ENA/Genie TV | August 18 | September 23 | Ended | |
| Aema | Netflix | August 22 | | Ended | |
| Bon Appétit, Your Majesty | tvN | August 23 | September 28 | Ended | |
| Twelve | KBS2 | August 23 | September 14 | Ended | |
| My Bias Is Showing?! | Heavenly | August 21 | September 25 | Ended | |
| My Youth | JTBC | September 5 | October 17 | Ended | |
| Queen Mantis | SBS TV | September 5 | September 27 | Ended | |
| Confidence Queen | TV Chosun | September 6 | October 12 | Ended | |
| Tempest | Disney+ | September 10 | October 1 | Ended | |
| You and Everything Else | Netflix | September 12 | | Ended | |
| A Hundred Memories | JTBC | September 13 | October 19 | Ended | |
| Shin's Project | tvN | September 15 | October 28 | Ended | |
| My Secret Vampire | Heavenly | September 19 | October 10 | Ended | |
| To the Moon | MBC TV | September 19 | October 31 | Ended | |
| Walking on Thin Ice | KBS2 | September 20 | October 26 | Ended | |
| A Graceful Liar | KBS2 | September 22 | February 20, 2026 | Ended | |
| First Lady | MBN | September 24 | October 30 | Ended | |
| No Mercy | Wavve/Dramax | September 24 | October 16 | Ended | |
| The Murky Stream | Hulu (Disney+) | September 26 | October 17 | Ended | |
| Ms. Incognito | ENA | September 29 | November 4 | Ended | |
| Genie, Make a Wish | Netflix | October 3 | | Ended | |
| Would You Marry Me? | SBS TV | October 10 | November 15 | Ended | |
| Typhoon Family | tvN | October 11 | November 30 | Ended | |
| Marie and Her Three Daddies | KBS1 | October 13 | March 27, 2026 | Ended | |
| The Dream Life of Mr. Kim | JTBC | October 25 | November 30 | Ended | |
| Spirit Fingers | TVING | October 29 | November 26 | Ended | |
| Last Summer | KBS2 | November 1 | December 7 | Ended | |
| Nice to Not Meet You | tvN | November 3 | December 30 | Ended | |
| The Manipulated | Hulu (Disney+) | November 5 | December 3 | Ended | |
| Dear X | TVING | November 6 | December 4 | Ended | |
| Peach Trap | Heavenly | November 6 | November 27 | Ended | |
| As You Stood By | Netflix | November 7 | | Ended | |
| Moon River | MBC TV | November 7 | December 20 | Ended | |
| Don't Call Me Ma'am | TV Chosun | November 10 | December 16 | Ended | |
| Dynamite Kiss | SBS TV | November 12 | December 25 | Ended | |
| Love.exe | Wavve | November 13 | December 4 | Ended | |
| Heroes Next Door | ENA | November 17 | December 16 | Ended | |
| Taxi Driver 3 | SBS TV | November 21 | January 10, 2026 | Ended | |
| Thundercloud Rainstorm | Wavve | November 28 | December 18 | Ended | |
| The Price of Confession | Netflix | December 5 | | Ended | |
| Pro Bono | tvN | December 6 | January 11, 2026 | Ended | |
| Surely Tomorrow | JTBC | December 6 | January 11, 2026 | Ended | |
| The First Man | MBC TV | December 15 | July 2, 2026 | Ended | |
| Villains | TVING | December 18 | January 8, 2026 | Ended | |
| Love Me | JTBC | December 19 | January 23, 2026 | Ended | |
| Idol I | ENA | December 22 | January 27, 2026 | Ended | |
| Concrete Market | Wavve | December 23 | December 30 | Ended | |
| Made in Korea | Hulu (Disney+) | December 24 | January 14, 2026 | Renewed | |
| Cashero | Netflix | December 26 | | Ended | |

== Ending ==
| End date | Title | Channel/Platform | First Aired | Ref. |
|---|---|---|---|---|
| January 4 | When the Phone Rings | MBC TV | November 22, 2024 | |
| January 23 | Who Is She | KBS2 | December 18, 2024 | |
| January 26 | Iron Family | KBS2 | September 28, 2024 | |
| January 26 | The Tale of Lady Ok | JTBC | November 30, 2024 | |
| January 28 | Namib | Genie TV/ENA | December 23, 2024 | |
| February 9 | Check-in Hanyang | Channel A | December 21, 2024 | |
| February 27 | Sorry Not Sorry | KBS Joy | December 5, 2024 | |
| April 8 | My Merry Marriage | KBS1 | October 7, 2024 | |
| April 25 | Cinderella Game | KBS2 | December 2, 2024 | |
| June 2 | Desperate Mrs. Seonju | MBC TV | November 18, 2024 | |

== See also ==
- List of Korean dramas
- 2024–25 Canadian network television schedule
- 2025-26 Canadian network television schedule
- 2025–26 South Korea network television schedule
- 2024–25 United States network television schedule
- 2025–26 United States network television schedule
- 2026 in South Korean television
