= Queen of Divorce =

2024 South Korean television series

- Promotional poster
- Hangul: 끝내주는 해결사
- Hanja: 끝내주는 解決士
- Lit.: Great Problem Solver
- RR: Kkeunnaejuneun haegyeolsa
- MR: Kkŭnnaejunŭn haegyŏlsa
- Genre: Legal drama
- Written by: Jeong Hee-seon
- Directed by: Park Jin-seok
- Starring: Lee Ji-ah; Kang Ki-young
- Music by: Park Seung-jin
- Country of origin: South Korea
- Original language: Korean
- No. of episodes: 12

Production
- Executive producers: Jo Seong-hoon; Sin Seon-ju; Yoon Chae-eun
- Producers: Song Dam-ah; Park Jin-hyung; Son Jae-seong; Jo Jun-hyung; Park Sang-eok; Kim Do-yeon
- Editor: Yoon Song-hwa
- Production companies: How Pictures; Drama House Studio; SLL

Original release
- Network: JTBC
- Release: January 31 – March 7, 2024

Queen of Divorce (Korean: 끝내주는 해결사) is a 2024 South Korean drama written by Jeong Hee-seon, directed by Park Jin-seok, as well as starring Lee Ji-ah and Kang Ki-young. It aired on JTBC from January 31, to March 7, 2024, every Wednesday and Thursday at 20:50 (KST). It is also available for streaming on TVING in South Korea, on Kocowa in the Americas, and on Viu and Viki in selected regions.

== Synopsis ==
The series is about a 'bad spouse' punishment solution provided by Korea's best divorce solver to put an end to the client's problematic marriage.

== Cast and characters ==
=== Main ===
- Lee Ji-ah as Kim Sa-ra

Team leader of the divorce resolution company 'Solution' who is a former lawyer at Chayul Law Firm.

- Kang Ki-young as Dong Ki-joon

A lawyer who is Sa-ra's business partner and advisor to 'Solution'.

- Oh Min-suk as Noh Yul-seong

Sa-ra's ex-husband who is a CEO of Chayul Law Firm.

=== Supporting ===
==== People at Solution ====
- Kim Sun-young as Son Jang-mi

CEO of the divorce resolution company 'Solution'.

- Lee Tae-gu as Kwon Dae-gi

Member of Solution who is a former data security expert.

- Seo Hye-won as Kang Bom

Member of Solution who is a former detective.

- Kim Si-hyeon as Jang Hee-jin

Manager of the Solutions Law Office.

==== People around Sa-ra ====
- Na Young-hee as Cha Hee-won

Sa-ra's former mother-in-law and Yul-seong's mother.

- Kang Ae-sim as Park Jeong-sook

Sa-ra's mother who is an owner of a tteokbokki restaurant.

- Jeong Min-jun as Noh Seo-yoon

Sa-ra and Yul-seong's only son.

- Lee Seo-an as Han Ji-in

Yul-seong's current wife.

=== Other ===
- Shim Yi-young as Lee Joo-won

A best-selling author who has one child.

== Original soundtrack ==
=== Part 1 ===
Released on February 7, 2024
No.	Title	Lyrics	Music	Artist	Length
1.	"Destiny"	Shim Hyun-bo; Park Sung-jin	Park Sung-jin; Choi Min-chang	Lena Park	4:14
2.	"Destiny" (Inst.)		Park Sung-jin; Choi Min-chang		4:14
Total length:					8:28

=== Part 2 ===
Released in February 2024
No.	Title	Lyrics	Music	Artist	Length
1.	"Don't Go Back"	Jeon Seung-woo; Park Sung-jin	Choi Min-chang	Siyeon (Dreamcatcher)	3:27
2.	Untitled (Inst.)		Choi Min-chang		3:27
Total length:					6:54

== Viewership ==
Queen of Divorce : South Korea viewers per episode (thousands)

Season	Episode number												Average
Season	1	2	3	4	5	6	7	8	9	10	11	12	Average
1	732	1036	1217	1253	1071	1277	1166	1215	949	1044	874	1190	1085

Source: Audience measurement performed nationwide by Nielsen Korea.

Average TV viewership ratings
Ep.	Original broadcast date	Average audience share (Nielsen Korea)	
Ep.	Original broadcast date	Nationwide	Seoul
1	January 31, 2024	3.311% (5th)	3.363% (4th)
2	February 1, 2024	4.897% (5th)	5.195% (4th)
3	February 7, 2024	5.750% (1st)	5.642% (1st)
4	February 8, 2024	5.680% (4th)	5.513% (4th)
5	February 14, 2024	4.641% (2nd)	4.386% (1st)
6	February 15, 2024	5.585% (4th)	5.801% (4th)
7	February 21, 2024	5.529% (1st)	5.743% (1st)
8	February 22, 2024	5.229% (5th)	4.972% (4th)
9	February 28, 2024	4.590% (1st)	4.410% (1st)
10	February 29, 2024	4.958% (5th)	5.056% (4th)
11	March 6, 2024	4.187% (4th)	3.852% (5th)
12	March 7, 2024	5.775% (4th)	5.931% (4th)
Average		5.011%	4.989%
In the table above, the blue numbers represent the lowest ratings and the red numbers represent the highest ratings.; This drama aired on a cable channel/pay TV which normally has a relatively smaller audience compared to free-to-air TV/public broadcasters (KBS, SBS, MBC, and EBS).
