= The Substitute (South Korean TV series) =

Upcoming South Korean television series

- Promotional poster
- Hangul: 대리수능
- Lit.: Proxy CSAT
- RR: Daerisuneung
- MR: Taerisunŭng
- Genre: Teen drama; Crime thriller
- Written by: Choi Soo
- Directed by: Park So-yeon
- Starring: Bae Hyun-sung; Cha Kang-yoon; Park Yoon-ho; Uhm Ji-won; Park Hyuk-kwon; Baek Ji-won
- Country of origin: South Korea
- Original language: Korean

Production
- Production companies: Studio Dragon; Sidus; Studio Wooyoungsoo

Original release
- Network: TVING

The Substitute (Korean: 대리수능) is an upcoming South Korean teen crime thriller television series written by Choi Soo, directed by Park So-yeon, and starring Bae Hyun-sung, Cha Kang-yoon, Park Yoon-ho, Uhm Ji-won, Park Hyuk-kwon, and Baek Ji-won. The series follows a top-ranking scholarship student at a prominent private high school who takes the college entrance exam as a substitute for a blackmailer, dragging them into a survival war driven by betrayal and manipulation. It is scheduled to premiere on TVING on November 23, 2026.

== Synopsis ==
The story follows Nam Jae-yeop, a well-rounded student from a wealthy background with excellent grades whose life is a mask. As he deviates from his father's life plan, his routine fractures, and he begins to spiral. Meanwhile, Kang Geon-tae, a low-income special scholarship student at Jeonggyeong High School who maintains the top rank, accepts an unjust proposal to escape poverty, plunging into a maelstrom. Joo Hee-dong, Geon-tae's best friend who takes pride in being the sole person Geon-tae confides in, experiences a rift in their friendship due to Jae-yeop's arrival, leading to unpredictable changes.

== Cast and characters ==
=== Main ===
- Bae Hyun-sung as Nam Jae-yeop

A student from a wealthy background with high academic standing whose life diverges from his father's expected path, leading to mounting tension and conflict with Kang Geon-tae.

- Cha Kang-yoon as Kang Geon-tae

A low-income special scholarship student at an elite private high school who consistently ranks first in his class. He becomes entangled in a high-stakes crime after accepting Jae-yeop's proposal.

- Park Yoon-ho as Joo Hee-dong

Geon-tae's best friend who views Geon-tae as an idol and confidant, and whose perspective shifts upon discovering Geon-tae's secret.

- Uhm Ji-won as Shim Gyeong-oh

A mother who stepped away from her career to focus on her son's academic advancement, who becomes linked to Geon-tae following an unexpected incident.

- Park Hyuk-kwon as Nam Dong-sik

Jae-yeop's father and a district mayor candidate characterized by strict expectations and transactional authority over his son.

- Baek Ji-won as Baek Seon-hee

Jae-yeop's mother, whose primary focus is her son's well-being and future success.

=== Supporting ===
- Woo Ji-hyun as Mr. Han

An individual who enters into a private agreement with Geon-tae, whose outward pragmatism masks underlying anxieties.

== Production ==
=== Development ===
The series is a teen crime thriller drama written by Choi Soo, (Note: In early reports, the screenwriter's full name, Choi Hye-soo, was used but later changed to Choi Soo.) directed by Park So-yeon, who helmed Pyramid Game (2024), and co-produced by Studio Dragon, Sidus, and Studio Wooyoungsoo. It was scheduled for a 2026 release.

=== Casting ===
In September 2025, Cha Kang-yoon was reportedly cast for his first lead role. Two days later, Bae Hyun-sung and Park Yoon-ho were also reportedly cast as other leads. On September 17, it was reported that Uhm Ji-won confirmed her appearance. The complete cast lineup was confirmed in October 2025, with the addition of Park Hyuk-kwon and Baek Ji-won.

=== Filming ===
Principal photography began in late 2025.

== Release ==
The Substitute is scheduled to premiere on TVING on November 23, 2026.
