= Cha Kang-yoon =

South Korean actor (born 2003)

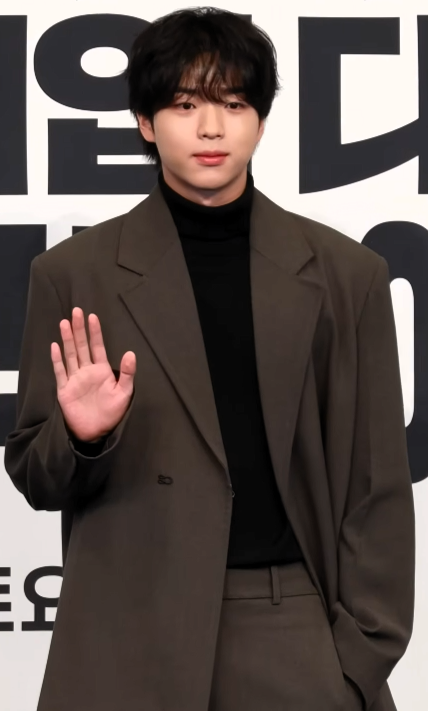
- Cha in 2025
- Born: March 12, 2003 (age 23); South Korea
- Education: Seoul Institute of the Arts – Department of Acting (enrolled)
- Occupation: Actor
- Years active: 2024–present
- Agent: VIBE Actors
- Height: 187 cm (6 ft 2 in)
- Website: Official website

Cha Kang-yoon (Korean: 차강윤; born March 12, 2003) is a South Korean actor. He made his debut in 2024 with the television series The Midnight Romance in Hagwon and landed his first leading role in The Art of Negotiation (2025).

== Filmography ==
=== Television series ===
Key
†	Denotes television productions that have not yet been released

Year	Title	Role	Notes	Ref.
2024	The Midnight Romance in Hagwon	Lee Si-woo		
2025	The Art of Negotiation	Choi Jin-su		
2025	Resident Playbook	Tak Gi-on		
2025	Head Over Heels	Pyo Ji-ho		
2025	The Dream Life of Mr. Kim	Kim Su-gyeom		
2026	The Substitute †	Kang Geon-tae		
