= The Midnight Romance in Hagwon =

2024 South Korean television series

- Promotional poster
- Hangul: 졸업
- Hanja: 卒業
- Lit.: Graduation
- RR: Joreop
- MR: Chorŏp
- Genre: Romance; Melodrama
- Written by: Park Kyung-hwa
- Directed by: Ahn Pan-seok
- Starring: Jung Ryeo-won; Wi Ha-joon
- Music by: Lee Nam-yeon
- Opening theme: "Don't Forget About Me" by The Restless Age
- Country of origin: South Korea
- Original language: Korean
- No. of episodes: 16

Production
- Executive producers: Kim Ryoon-hee (CP); Choi Bo-ra
- Producers: Lee Jin-suk; Lee Chang-ho; Cho Youn-hee
- Cinematography: Yoon Seok-jo; Choi Han-sol
- Editor: Hwang Geum-bong
- Running time: 70 minutes
- Production companies: Studio Dragon; JS Pictures

Original release
- Network: tvN
- Release: May 11 – June 30, 2024

The Midnight Romance in Hagwon (Korean: 졸업) is a 2024 South Korean romance melodrama television series written by Park Kyung-hwa, directed by Ahn Pan-seok, and starring Jung Ryeo-won and Wi Ha-joon. It aired on tvN from May 11 to June 30, 2024, every Saturday and Sunday at 21:20 (KST). It is also available for streaming on TVING in South Korea, and on Viki and Viu in selected regions.

== Synopsis ==
It tells the story of a secret and sweet real-life romance between Seo Hye-jin, a veteran cram school instructor, and Lee Jun-ho, a quirky student who returns after a decade to stir her heart. The secret midnight romance that begins when the lights go out in Daechi-dong Academy, and the colorful stories of the academy instructors we didn't know about.

== Cast and characters ==
=== Main ===
- Jung Ryeo-won as Seo Hye-jin

A star tutor with 14 years of experience. She is a quiet competitor with a solid inner game who never gives up.

- Wi Ha-joon as Lee Jun-ho

A new lecturer who returns after 10 years and stirs up Seo Hye-jin's daily life and heart.

=== Supporting ===
==== People at Daechi Chase Academy ====
- So Joo-yeon as Nam Cheong-mi

A new instructor in the Korean Language Department of Daechi Chase Academy and has bold personality.

- Kim Jong-tae as Kim Hyun-tak

Director of Daechi Chase Academy.

- Kim Jung-young as Woo Seung-hui

Deputy Director of Daechi Chase Academy.

- Gil Hae-yeon as Kim Hyo-im

Counseling Manager of Daechi Chase Academy.

- Jang In-sub as Yoon Ji-seok

English Department 1 team leader of Daechi Chase Academy who is fairly popular and has an unrequited love for Hye-jin.

- Lee Si-hoon as Lee Myeong-jun

Korean Language Department 2 team leader of Daechi Chase Academy. He was the highest ranking Korean-language until Hye-jin came.

- Yang Jo-a as Min Hee-joo

Social Studies team leader of Daechi Chase Academy.

- Ahn Hyun-ho as Kim Chae-yoon

Korean Language Instructor of Daechi Chase Academy and Hye-jin's team member for three years. She graduated from the Department of Korean-language Education at a top-ranked women's university.

- Yuk Hyun-suk as Jang Il-do

English Department 2 team leader of Daechi Chase Academy.

- Lim Jin-hyo as Shin Dae-baek

The new instructor at English Department of Daechi Chase Academy who gets along well with people.

- Jang So-yeon as Choi Ji-eun

Administrative and Support Department head of Daechi Chase Academy.

==== People at Daechi Choisun Academy ====
- Seo Jeong-yeon as Choi Hyung-sun

Director and Instructor of Daechi Choisun Academy and known as White-haired Witch. She has the largest number of students at Heewon High School in Daechi-dong for 20 years.

- Lee Kyu-sung as Park Ki-sung

Hyung-sun's assistant who is shrouded in mystery.

==== People around Jun-ho ====
- Shin Joo-hyup as Choi Seung-gyu

Jun-ho's best friend and worldly cynical graduate student. He gave up getting a job and went to graduate school.

- Yoon Bok-in as Oh Jeong-hwa

Jun-ho's mother who was once known as the "pig mom".

- Oh Man-seok as Lee Taek-yeol

Jun-ho's father who is a former executive at a large securities company but now a current executive at a small to medium-sized company.

==== People around Hye-jin ====
- Hwang Eun-hoo as Cha Seo-young

Hye-jin's best friend and a lawyer.

- Jeon Suk-chan as Geum Chun-il

Owner of Night Flight bar.

==== People at Chanyoung High School in Daechi-dong ====
- Kim Song-il as Pyo Sang-sub

A Korean Language Teacher at Chanyoung High School with 20-year experience.

- Kim Na-yeon as Sung Ha-yool

A student at Chanyoung High School who is timid and smart.

- Jin Ga-eun as Lee Ye-eun

A student at Chanyoung High School who is cheerful and simple.

- Park Min-su as Lee Jung-soo

A student at Chanyoung High School who is the class president.

==== People at Heewon High School in Daechi-dong ====
- Cha Kang-yoon as Lee Si-woo

A student at Heewon High School who rank first in the entire school.

== Production ==
=== Development ===
The Midnight Romance in Hagwon was the 2024 romance melodrama series of director Ahn Pan-seok, who directed Something in the Rain (2018) and One Spring Night (2019), and attracted the attention of broadcasters since the beginning of production. Park Kyung-hwa announced as the writer while Studio Dragon and JS Pictures managed the production of the series.

=== Casting ===
Jung Ryeo-won and Wi Ha-joon were offered the lead roles for the series in July and October 2023, respectively.

Jung and Wi were officially confirmed as the lead actors of the series.

=== Filming ===
Principal photography began in October 2023.

== Original soundtrack ==
The soundtrack of the series, led by music director Lee Nam-yeon and featuring an American band The Restless Age was revealed on May 10, 2024.

=== Album ===
The Midnight Romance in Hagwon (Original Soundtrack)

Soundtrack album by The Restless Age
- Released: June 30, 2024
- Length: 35:42
- Label: Stone Music

Singles from The Midnight Romance in Hagwon
- 1. "Don't Forget About Me" Released: May 12, 2024; 2. "Catch Me" Released: May 12, 2024; 3. "Now and Then" Released: May 19, 2024; 4. "Together With You" Released: June 2, 2024; 5. "Simple Melody" Released: June 9, 2024

The Midnight Romance in Hagwon's soundtrack album was released on June 30, 2024; it contains all of the singles and background tracks from the series.

==== Tracklist ====
All tracks are written by Will Bryant, Lee Falco, Brandon Morrison, and Lee Nam-yeon.

No.	Title	Artist	Length
1.	"Catch Me"	The Restless Age	3:44
2.	"Don't Forget About Me"	The Restless Age	3:53
3.	"Now and Then"	The Restless Age	4:44
4.	"Together With You"	The Restless Age	3:53
5.	"Simple Melody"	The Restless Age	4:20
6.	"Old Memories"		1:50
7.	"A Raw Youth"		1:15
8.	"Hall of Fame"		1:00
9.	"Farewell to School"		1:42
10.	"Wounded but Okay"		2:17
11.	"Conversation"		2:57
12.	"They Found Out About Us"		1:01
13.	"Declare War"		3:59
14.	"Our Project"		1:40
15.	"Scheme"		1:47
Total length:			35:42

=== Singles ===
Singles included on the album were released from May 12, to June 9, 2024.

Original soundtrack (Part 1–4)

Part 1

All tracks are written by Will Bryant, Lee Falco, Brandon Morrison, and Lee Nam-yeon.

Released on May 12, 2024
No.	Title	Artist	Length
1.	"Don't Forget About Me"	The Restless Age	3:54
2.	"Catch Me"	The Restless Age	3:45
Total length:			7:39

Part 2

All tracks are written by Will Bryant, Lee Falco, Brandon Morrison, and Lee Nam-yeon.

Released on May 19, 2024
No.	Title	Artist	Length
1.	"Now and Then"	The Restless Age	4:44
Total length:			4:44

Part 3

All tracks are written by Will Bryant, Lee Falco, Brandon Morrison, and Lee Nam-yeon.

Released on June 2, 2024
No.	Title	Artist	Length
1.	"Together With You"	The Restless Age	3:53
Total length:			3:53

Part 4

All tracks are written by Will Bryant, Lee Falco, Brandon Morrison, and Lee Nam-yeon.

Released on June 9, 2024
No.	Title	Artist	Length
1.	"Simple Melody"	The Restless Age	4:21
Total length:			4:21

== Release ==
In October 2023, the series was scheduled to be released on tvN in 2024 and is also available for streaming on TVING, Viki, and Viu. Five months later, tvN confirmed that the release date would be on May 11, 2024.

== Viewership ==
The Midnight Romance in Hagwon : South Korea viewers per episode (thousands)

Season	Episode number																Average
Season	1	2	3	4	5	6	7	8	9	10	11	12	13	14	15	16	Average
1	1183	1269	675	1061	946	1278	930	1011	741	996	854	1054	802	1198	871	1456	1020

Source: Audience measurement performed nationwide by Nielsen Korea.

Average TV viewership ratings
Ep.	Original broadcast date	Average audience share (Nielsen Korea)	
Ep.	Original broadcast date	Nationwide	Seoul
1	May 11, 2024	5.169% (1st)	6.329% (1st)
2	May 12, 2024	5.150% (1st)	5.492% (1st)
3	May 18, 2024	3.010% (1st)	4.005% (1st)
4	May 19, 2024	4.805% (1st)	6.052% (1st)
5	May 25, 2024	4.231% (1st)	5.262% (1st)
6	May 26, 2024	4.897% (1st)	5.749% (1st)
7	June 1, 2024	4.117% (1st)	5.248% (1st)
8	June 2, 2024	4.322% (2nd)	5.434% (1st)
9	June 8, 2024	3.175% (1st)	3.676% (1st)
10	June 9, 2024	4.173% (2nd)	4.957% (2nd)
11	June 15, 2024	3.369% (1st)	4.309% (1st)
12	June 16, 2024	4.790% (1st)	5.950% (1st)
13	June 22, 2024	3.614% (1st)	4.553% (1st)
14	June 23, 2024	5.192% (1st)	6.306% (1st)
15	June 29, 2024	3.940% (1st)	4.476% (1st)
16	June 30, 2024	6.596% (1st)	7.442% (1st)
Average		4.409%	5.328%
In the table above, the blue numbers represent the lowest ratings and the red numbers represent the highest ratings.; This drama aired on a cable channel/pay TV which normally has a relatively smaller audience compared to free-to-air TV/public broadcasters (KBS, SBS, MBC, and EBS).

== Accolades ==
=== Listicles ===
Name of publisher, year listed, name of listicle, and placement
Publisher	Year	Listicle	Placement	Ref.
Cine21	2024	Top 10 Series of 2024	3rd place	
NME	2024	The 10 best K-dramas of 2024 – so far	Included	
