= The Art of Negotiation =

2025 South Korean television series

- Promotional poster
- Hangul: 협상의 기술
- Hanja: 協商의 技術
- RR: Hyeopsangui gisul
- MR: Hyŏpsangŭi kisul
- Genre: Workplace
- Written by: Lee Seung-young
- Directed by: Ahn Pan-seok
- Starring: Lee Je-hoon; Kim Dae-myung; Sung Dong-il; Jang Hyun-sung; Oh Man-seok; Ahn Hyun-ho; Cha Kang-yoon
- Music by: Lee Nam-yeon
- Country of origin: South Korea
- Original language: Korean
- No. of episodes: 12

Production
- Running time: 70 minutes
- Production companies: SLL; B.A Entertainment; Drama House Studio

Original release
- Network: JTBC
- Release: March 8 – April 13, 2025

The Art of Negotiation (Korean: 협상의 기술) is a 2025 South Korean television series starring Lee Je-hoon, Kim Dae-myung, Sung Dong-il, Jang Hyun-sung, Oh Man-seok, Ahn Hyun-ho, and Cha Kang-yoon. The series deals with the story of mergers and acquisitions between companies. It aired on JTBC from March 8, to April 13, 2025, every Saturday and Sunday at 22:30 (KST). It is also available for streaming on Viu in selected regions.

== Synopsis ==
The series depicts the exploits of a major corporation's M&A expert, known as a legendary negotiator, and his team.

== Cast and characters ==
=== Main ===
- Lee Je-hoon as Yoon Joo-no

A legendary negotiator and leader of the M&A team.

- Kim Dae-myung as Oh Soon-young

A lawyer specializing in negotiations for the M&A team.

- Sung Dong-il as Song Jae-sik

The Chairman of Sanin Group.

- Jang Hyun-sung as Ha Tae-soo

The CFO of Sanin Group and second-in-command.

- Oh Man-seok as Lee Dong-joon

The CCO of Sanin Group and longtime close friend of Chairman Song.

- Ahn Hyun-ho as Kwak Min-jung

The manager of the M&A team.

- Cha Kang-yoon as Choi Jin-su

The intern and youngest member of the M&A team.

=== Supporting ===
- Lee Kyu-sung as Lim Hyeong-seop

A deputy manager of Sanin Group's human resources division.

- Park Hyung-soo as Kang Sang-bae

A director of Yoomin Investment.

- Yang Jo-ah as Han Ji-eun
- Kim Jong-tae as Jo Bum-soo

=== Special appearances ===
- Yoon Je-moon as Lee Hoon-min (Ep. 1 & 10)

CEO of Sanin Construction.

- Jang In-sub as Cha Ho-jin (Ep. 3-4)

CEO of Cha Cha Games.

- Kwon Yu-ri as Song Ji-oh (Ep. 5-6)

Song Jae-sik's daughter and CEO of Dado Resort.

- Jang So-yeon as Jeong Bon-joo (Ep. 9-10)

Financing Officer of Green View Country Club.

== Production ==
=== Development ===
The series is written by Lee Seung-young and directed by Ahn Pan-seok, who previously directed The Midnight Romance in Hagwon (2024), and B.A Entertainment and SLL and Drama House Studio co-managed the production.

=== Casting ===
On May 14, 2024, Kim Dae-myung was reportedly confirmed to appear by his agency. On May 21, Lee Je-hoon was confirmed to appear as the lead. On June 12, Kwon Yu-ri was reported to make a special appearance. On July 11, Cha Kang-yoon had been cast as the lead.

In January 2025, the line up of actors were revealed namely Lee, Kim, Sung Dong-il, Jang Hyun-sung, Oh Man-seok, Ahn Hyun-ho, and Cha.

== Viewership ==
The Art of Negotiation : South Korea viewers per episode (millions)

Season	Episode number												Average
Season	1	2	3	4	5	6	7	8	9	10	11	12	Average
1	0.762	1.462	1.298	1.691	1.445	1.805	1.390	1.903	1.676	2.038	1.709	2.487	1.639

Source: Audience measurement performed nationwide by Nielsen Korea.

Average TV viewership ratings
Ep.	Original broadcast date	Average audience share (Nielsen Korea)	
Ep.	Original broadcast date	Nationwide	Seoul
1	March 8, 2025	3.300% (2nd)	3.586% (1st)
2	March 9, 2025	6.068% (1st)	6.349% (1st)
3	March 15, 2025	5.783% (1st)	5.535% (1st)
4	March 16, 2025	7.121% (1st)	7.298% (1st)
5	March 22, 2025	6.459% (1st)	6.398% (1st)
6	March 23, 2025	7.982% (1st)	8.320% (1st)
7	March 29, 2025	6.185% (1st)	6.171% (1st)
8	March 30, 2025	8.079% (1st)	8.758% (1st)
9	April 5, 2025	6.933% (1st)	7.064% (1st)
10	April 6, 2025	8.805% (1st)	9.545% (1st)
11	April 12, 2025	7.182% (1st)	8.030% (1st)
12	April 13, 2025	10.315% (1st)	11.298% (1st)
Average		7.018%	7.363%
In the table above, the blue numbers represent the lowest ratings and the red numbers represent the highest ratings.; This drama aired on a cable channel/pay TV which normally has a relatively smaller audience compared to free-to-air TV/public broadcasters (KBS, SBS, MBC, and EBS).

== Accolades ==
Award ceremony	Year	Category	Nominee	Result	Ref.
Asian Television Awards	2025	Best Drama Series	The Art of Negotiation	Pending	
