= Sacred Jewel =

Upcoming South Korean television series

- Promotional poster
- Hangul: 신의 구슬
- Lit.: God's Beads
- RR: Sinui guseul
- MR: Sinŭi kusŭl
- Genre: Historical drama; Fantasy; Action; Romance
- Written by: Jung Hyun-min
- Directed by: Jung Dae-yoon
- Starring: Ahn Bo-hyun; Lee Sung-min; Ha Yoon-kyung; Claudia Kim; Yoon Kyun-sang
- Country of origin: South Korea
- Original language: Korean

Production
- Running time: 70 minutes
- Production companies: SLL; Celltrion Entertainment

Original release
- Network: JTBC
- Release: December 5, 2026

Sacred Jewel (Korean: 신의 구슬) is an upcoming South Korean historical fantasy television series written by Jung Hyun-min, directed by Jung Dae-yoon, and starring Ahn Bo-hyun, Lee Sung-min, Ha Yoon-kyung, Claudia Kim and Yoon Kyun-sang. The series is scheduled to premiere on JTBC on December 5, 2026, and will air every Saturday and Sunday at 22:40 (KST). It will also be available for streaming on Coupang Play in South Korea and Amazon Prime Video internationally.

== Synopsis ==
Set in 1258 during the Goryeo Dynasty, the series follows an expedition unit sent to find the Avalokitesvara Bead, a sacred relic believed to possess divine power to protect the kingdom. When the mission puts the soldiers in danger, a princess sets out to rescue them.

== Cast and characters ==
- Ahn Bo-hyun as Baek Gyeol, a military commander appointed by the Emperor's royal decree
- Lee Sung-min as Choi Gu, captain of the Yabyeolcho (Special Night Unit)
- Ha Yoon-kyung as Geol Seung, a guide
- Claudia Kim as Princess Gyeonghwa, also known as Wang Hee
- Yoon Kyun-sang as Wang Mu, a Defense Inspector

== Production ==
The series was directed by Jung Dae-yoon, known for Reborn Rich (2022), and written by Jung Hyun-min, whose previous works include Jeong Do-jeon (2014) and Nokdu Flower (2019). It was produced by SLL and Celltrion Entertainment, this marked the second collaboration between JTBC and Celltrion on a major historical drama after the series My Country: The New Age (2019).

== Release ==
It premiered internationally at the 9th Cannes International Series Festival on April 24, 2026, as part of the Korea Fiction programme in the RENDEZ-VOUS section. The screening took place at the Palais des Festivals, followed by a guest session attended by cast members and the production team.

The series is scheduled to premiere on JTBC on December 5, 2026, at 22:40 (KST).
