= Jang In-sub =

South Korean actor

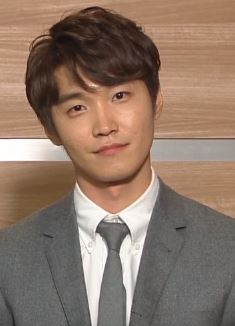
- Jang in March 2016
- Born: Jang In-sub; 24 February 1987 (age 39); South Korea
- Other names: Jang In-seob, Jang In-sup
- Education: Korea National University of Arts
- Occupation: Actor
- Years active: 2011–present
- Agent: Dana Creative ENT

Jang In-sub (born 24 February 1987) is a South Korean actor. He is best known for his roles in Special Affairs Team TEN Season 2, Secret Door and Mrs. Cop. Lee also appeared in the famous and popular drama of School series, Who Are You: School 2015 as Seong Yoon Jae.

== Filmography ==
=== Film ===
| Year | Title | Role | Ref. |
|---|---|---|---|
| 2013 | Hwayi: A Monster Boy | Detective Chang-Ho | |
| 2013 | Steel Cold Winter | Yeong Jae | |
| 2014 | A Hard Day | Policeman | |
| 2014 | No Tears for the Dead | Finance crime special team | |
| 2015 | The Phone | Department Head Kim | |
| 2015 | Fatal Intuition | Detective | |
| 2016 | Love, Lies | Hong Seok | |
| 2016 | Kissing Cousin | Tae Ok | |
| 2017 | Coffee Noir: Black Brown | Jae Eung | |
| 2017 | The Merciless | Min Chul | |
| 2021 | Action Hero | Jae-woo | |
| 2022 | Kingmaker | Seok-mi | |
| 2023 | Kill Boksoon | Yoon-seok | |

=== Television ===
Key
| † | Denotes television productions that have not yet been released |

| Year | Title | Role | Notes | Ref. |
|---|---|---|---|---|
| 2011-13 | Special Affairs Team TEN | Kim Yoon Seok | | |
| 2014 | Angel's Revenge | In Seob | | |
| 2014 | God's Gift: 14 Days | Manager | | |
| 2014 | Three Days | Policeman | | |
| 2014 | What Happens to My Family? | The Sword | | |
| 2014 | Secret Door | Jang Dong Gi | Cameo | |
| 2015 | Who Are You: School 2015 | Seong Yoon Jae | | |
| 2015 | Mrs. Cop | Prosecutor Go | | |
| 2015 | All About My Mom | Shin Jae Min | | |
| 2016 | Happy Home | Bong Man Ho | | |
| 2017 | Two Cops | Ji Min Seok | | |
| 2018 | Queen of Mystery 2 | Im Woo Cheol | | |
| 2018 | Grand Prince | Doh Jeong gook | | |
| 2018 | Suits | Jang Seok Hyun | | |
| 2018 | Devilish Charm | Yang Woo Jin | | |
| 2019 | Justice | Section Chief Choi | | |
| 2019 | Understanding of Electric Shock | Jung | | |
| 2020 | Rugal | Bradley | | |
| 2020 | Find Me in Your Memory | Park Soo Chang | | |
| 2021–22 | Snowdrop | Lee Eung-chul | | |
| 2023 | Taxi Driver 2 | Choi Sung-eun | Cameo (Episode 12) | |
| 2023 | Korea–Khitan War | Hwangbo Yu-ui | | |
| 2023 | Gyeongseong Creature | Comrade | | |
| 2024 | Doctor Slump | Plastic surgeon | | |
| 2024 | The Midnight Romance in Hagwon | Yoon Ji-seok | | |
| 2025 | The Art of Negotiation | Cha Ho-jin | | |
| 2026 | Between Steps | Lee Ji-hoon | | |

=== Web series ===
| Year | Title | Role | Ref. |
|---|---|---|---|
| 2021 | The Magic | So Sang-hee | |

== Theater ==
| Year | English title | Korean title | Role | Ref. |
|---|---|---|---|---|
| 2022 | The Invisible Hand | 보이지 않는 손 | Bashir | |

== Awards and nominations ==
| Year | Award | Category | Nominated work | Result |
|---|---|---|---|---|
| 2016 | 35th MBC Drama Awards | Best New Actor | Happy Home | Nominated |
