= Shark: The Storm =

2025 South Korean television series

- Promotional poster
- Hangul: 샤크 : 더 스톰
- RR: Syakeu : deo seutom
- MR: Syak'ŭ : tŏ sŭt'om
- Genre: Action thriller; Crime drama
- Based on: Shark by: Woon; Kim Woo-seob
- Written by: Min Ji
- Directed by: Kim Geon
- Starring: Kim Min-seok; Lee Hyun-wook
- Country of origin: South Korea
- Original language: Korean
- No. of episodes: 6

Production
- Production companies: SLL; Toyou's Dream

Original release
- Network: TVING
- Release: May 15, 2025

Related
- Shark: The Beginning (film)

Shark: The Storm (Korean: 샤크 : 더 스톰) is a 2025 South Korean action thriller crime drama television series written by Min Ji, directed by Kim Geon, and starring Kim Min-seok and Lee Hyun-wook. The series is based on the Kakao Webtoon Shark by Woon and Kim Woo-seob and the sequel of the 2021 TVING original film Shark: The Beginning. It was released on TVING on May 15, 2025.

== Synopsis ==
Cha Woo-sol, once a target of unyielding school bullying, took a drastic step when he snapped and stabbed his abuser, resulting in a prison sentence. While incarcerated, he encountered Jung Do-hyun, a former MMA champion, who became his mentor, teaching him the skills to fight and survive. After his release, Woo-sol is resolved to move on from his past and chase his aspiration of becoming a professional mixed martial arts fighter. He trains rigorously, aiming to carve out a new future despite the stigma attached to being an ex-convict. His former prison companions, who are also striving to lead reformed lives, support him. Among them, Lee Won-joon stands out as he seeks to make amends to those he bullied in his past. Nevertheless, Woo-sol's attempts to lead a tranquil life are disrupted when he encounters Hyun Woo-yong. Woo-yong is a formidable and sadistic gang leader who operates a brutal underground fighting league for his own twisted enjoyment. A skilled fighter himself, he views Woo-sol as a new plaything to manipulate and exploit. Initially, Woo-sol attempts to steer clear of Woo-yong's perilous realm, but Woo-yong's unyielding pursuit and readiness to harm those close to Woo-sol compel him to act. This leads to an intense struggle for survival, with Woo-sol being pulled into the merciless illegal fighting circuit. He is no longer merely fighting for himself but also to safeguard his friends and loved ones from Woo-yong's violent syndicate.

== Cast and characters ==
=== Main ===
- Kim Min-seok as Cha Woo-sol
- Lee Hyun-wook as Hyun Woo-yong

=== Supporting ===
- Bae Myung-jin as Lee Won-joon
- Lee Jung-hyun as Han Sung-yong
- Park Jin as Jung Sang-hyeop
- Jung Da-eun as Lee Yeon-jin
- Lee Yoo-jun as Cannon

=== Special appearance ===
- Wi Ha-joon as Jung Do-hyun

== Production and release ==
The series is based on Kakao webtoon Shark by Woon and Kim Woo-seob, and the sequel of the 2021 TVING's original film Shark: The Beginning. Kim Min-seok, Bae Myung-jin, and Lee Jung-hyun would reprised their roles along with Lee Hyun-wook, who made a special appearance in the film and Park Jin. The principal photography began in July 2022 and was supposed to be released in the first half of 2023. In November 2024, TVING revealed their original content lineup for 2025 and Shark: The Storm is among them. In April 2025, TVING confirmed that all six episodes of the series would be released on May 15, 2025.
