= Park Yoon-ho =

South Korean actor (born 2003)

- Born: April 3, 2003 (age 23); Seoul, South Korea
- Education: School of Performing Arts Seoul; Sungkyunkwan University
- Occupation: Actor
- Years active: 2023–present
- Agent: Innit Entertainment

Korean name
- Hangul: 박윤호
- RR: Bak Yunho
- MR: Pak Yunho
- Website: Official website

Park Yoon-ho (Korean: 박윤호; born April 3, 2003) is a South Korean actor. He is best known for his roles in Night Has Come (2023), Study Group (2025), and Trigger (2025).

== Early life and career ==
Park Yoon-ho was born on April 3, 2003, in Seoul, South Korea. He graduated from School of Performing Arts Seoul and is currently majoring in acting at Sungkyunkwan University.

On February 28, 2025, Park signed an exclusive contract with Innit Entertainment.

== Filmography ==
=== Film ===
Key
†	Denotes films that have not yet been released

Year	Title	Role	Ref.
TBA	Land †	Tae-goo	

=== Television series ===
Key
†	Denotes television productions that have not yet been released

Year	Title	Role	Ref.
2023	Night Has Come	Heo Yool	
2024	Love Your Enemy	Kim Dong-woon (Special appearance)	
2025	Study Group	Lee Hyun-woo	
2025	Resident Playbook	Yeong-chan	
2025	Our Unwritten Seoul	teen Lee Ho-su	
2025	Trigger	Park Gyu-jin	
2025	Pro Bono	teen Kang Da-wit	
2026	Mousetrap	Seo Yu-min	
2026	The Substitute †	Joo Hee-dong	

=== Web series ===
Year	Title	Role	Ref.
2024	Gang Girl Goes to Boys High School	Kang Si-won	

=== Music video appearances ===
Year	Title	Artist	Ref.
2026	"Always"	Parc Jae-jung, Sullyoon	

== Awards and nominations ==
Name of the award ceremony, year presented, category, nominee of the award, and the result of the nomination
Award ceremony	Year	Category	Nominee / Work	Result	Ref.
Asia Artist Awards	2025	Rookie of the Year – Actor	Park Yoon-ho	Won	
