= Head over Heels (South Korean TV series) =

2025 South Korean television series

- Promotional poster
- Also known as: Gyeonwoo and Fairy
- Hangul: 견우와 선녀
- Lit.: The Cowherd and the Fairy Girl
- RR: Gyeonuwa seonnyeo
- MR: Kyŏnuwa sŏnnyŏ
- Genre: Romantic fantasy
- Based on: Gyeonwoo and Fairy by Ahn Soo-min
- Written by: Yang Ji-hoon
- Directed by: Kim Yong-wan
- Starring: Cho Yi-hyun; Choo Young-woo; Cha Kang-yoon; Choo Ja-hyun
- Music by: Kim Dong-wook
- Country of origin: South Korea
- Original language: Korean
- No. of episodes: 12

Production
- Running time: 70 minutes
- Production companies: Studio Dragon; Dexter Pictures (Note: Dexter Pictures is a South Korean television series production company launched in 2022 by Dexter Studios, a VFX post-production and film production company founded and owned by Kim Yong-hwa.); EO Contents Group

Original release
- Network: tvN
- Release: June 23 – July 29, 2025

Head over Heels (Korean: 견우와 선녀) is a 2025 South Korean television series based on the webtoon of the same name by Ahn Su-min, starring Cho Yi-hyun, Choo Young-woo, Cha Kang-yoon, and Choo Ja-hyun. The series is about a high school girl shaman who rescues her unlucky first love. It aired on tvN from June 23, to July 29, 2025, every Monday and Tuesday at 20:50 (KST). It is also available for streaming on TVING in South Korea and Amazon Prime Video in selected regions.

== Synopsis ==
A fantasy romance drama, the story revolves around Seong-ah, a shaman who knows what will happen in the future, trying to protect her first love, Bae Gyeon-woo, by changing his ill-fated fate.

== Cast and characters ==
=== Main ===
- Cho Yi-hyun as Park Seong-ah
  - Lee A-rin as young Seong-ah

A high school student who leads a double life as a shaman by night.

- Choo Young-woo as Bae Gyeon-woo / Bongsu
  - Kim Hee-seong as young Gyeon-woo

Seong-ah's first love, who is plagued by bad luck and was born with the misfortune of a predestined death.

- Cha Kang-yoon as Pyo Ji-ho

Classmate of Seong-ah's and only person in school to know her secret of being a shaman.

- Choo Ja-hyun as Yeom-hwa (Note: In the 12th and final episode, it was eventually revealed that "Yeom-hwa" was actually her pseudonym. Bae Gyeon-woo tried to ask for her real name, but she refused to disclose it after finding out that he was still scared at her and eventually told him not to rush himself into forgiving her.)

General Dong-cheon's original spirit daughter before Park Seong-ah, who later changed due to losing someone precious to her.

=== Supporting ===
- Kim Mi-kyung as General Dong-cheon

Seong-ah's current and Yeom-hwa's former spirit mother.

- Yoon Byung-hee as Kkotdoryeong

General Dong-cheon's assistant who is also a close friend to Yeom-hwa.

- Kim Min-joo as Gu Do-yeon
- Unknown as Bongsu / Jang Yoon-bo
- Lee Young-ran as Grand Aunt (Heaven and Earth Fairy Shrine)
- Lee Soo-mi as Aunt (Heaven and Earth Fairy Shrine)
- Moo Hyun as the possessed man (Ep. 1)
- Shin Min-seo as the Water Ghost (Ep. 1)
- Jung Sun-chul as Choi Gang-sik (Ep. 1)

== Original work ==
The series is based on the popular Naver webtoon of the same name written and illustrated by Ahn Su-min, which was serialized on Naver Webtoon from February 2020 to March 2022. The webtoon was widely praised for its unique blend of traditional Korean shamanism (Muism) and high school romantic fantasy, paving the way for its television adaptation.

== Production ==
=== Development ===
The series is directed by Kim Yong-wan, whose work includes If You Wish Upon Me (2022) and The Whirlwind (2024). Written by Yang Ji-hoon, it was planned by CJENM and produced by Studio Dragon, Dexter Pictures and EO Contents Group.

=== Casting ===
In 2024, Cho Yi-hyun, Choo Young-woo and Choi Sung-eun were reportedly considering to appear.

== Viewership ==
Head over Heels : South Korea viewers per episode (thousands)

Season	Episode number												Average
Season	1	2	3	4	5	6	7	8	9	10	11	12	Average
1	1043	1104	886	788	851	961	1165	1040	1055	1026	1159	1167	1020

Source: Audience measurement performed nationwide by Nielsen Korea.

Average TV viewership ratings
Ep.	Original broadcast date	Average audience share (Nielsen Korea)	
Ep.	Original broadcast date	Nationwide	Seoul
1	June 23, 2025	4.295% (1st)	4.691% (1st)
2	June 24, 2025	4.365% (1st)	4.490% (1st)
3	June 30, 2025	3.740% (1st)	3.873% (1st)
4	July 1, 2025	3.483% (1st)	3.539% (1st)
5	July 7, 2025	3.683% (1st)	3.813% (1st)
6	July 8, 2025	4.005% (1st)	3.910% (1st)
7	July 14, 2025	4.822% (1st)	4.566% (1st)
8	July 15, 2025	4.431% (1st)	4.367% (1st)
9	July 21, 2025	4.569% (1st)	4.482% (1st)
10	July 22, 2025	4.416% (1st)	4.202% (1st)
11	July 28, 2025	4.686% (1st)	4.614% (1st)
12	July 29, 2025	4.942% (1st)	5.109% (1st)
Average		4.286%	4.305%
In the table above, the blue numbers represent the lowest ratings and the red numbers represent the highest ratings.; This drama aired on a cable channel/pay TV which normally has a relatively smaller audience compared to free-to-air TV/public broadcasters (KBS, SBS, MBC, and EBS).
