= Mousetrap (TV series) =

2026 South Korean television series

- Promotional poster
- Hangul: 들쥐
- Lit.: Field Mouse
- RR: Deuljwi
- MR: Tŭlchwi
- Genre: Mystery; Thriller
- Based on: Field Mouse by Ludovico
- Written by: Lee Jae-gon
- Directed by: Kim Hong-sun
- Starring: Ryu Jun-yeol; Sul Kyung-gu; Lee Kyu-hyung
- Music by: Kim Tae-seong
- Country of origin: South Korea
- Original language: Korean
- No. of episodes: 10

Production
- Executive producers: Jang Se-jung; Kim Hong-sun; Park Jong-hak; Park Ho-sik; Baek Chang-ju
- Producer: Kim Seok-won
- Cinematography: Choi Yoon-man; Kim Dong-su
- Animators: Choi Song-hee; Kim Tae-hyung; Kim Han-wool
- Editors: Choi Min-young; Choi Kyung-yoon
- Running time: 49–64 minutes
- Production companies: Kakao Entertainment; H House; Studio PIM; C-JeS Studios

Original release
- Network: Netflix
- Release: August 28, 2026

The Rat (Korean: 들쥐) is a 2026 South Korean mystery thriller television series written by Lee Jae-gon, directed by Kim Hong-sun, and starring Ryu Jun-yeol, Sul Kyung-gu, and Lee Kyu-hyung. Based on the Kakao webtoon Field Mouse by Ludovico. It was released on Netflix on August 28, 2026.

== Plot ==
Je Moon-Jae, a novelist who had one big success years ago, hasn’t left his apartment after being traumatised since his mother drove the car into the sea, killing herself and his father.

Agoraphobic and medicated, Moon-Jae is content to let his college friend Son Su-Hyun run his entire life for him: bank accounts, prescriptions, even the deed to his own home.

That arrangement collapses the day his fingerprint stops unlocking his phone. Within hours, he learns his apartment was sold out from under him, his identity documents were quietly re-registered by someone else two months ago, and a violent fixer named Noja, who believes Moon-jae vanished with money he embezzled three years back, is hunting him down. Cornered in an alley, Moon-jae comes face to face with the reason for all of it: a man wearing his own face.

Rather than staying enemies, Moon-Jae and No-ja strike a deal; No-ja will help find the impostor if Moon-Jae repays the debt once his life is sorted out. It's an alliance of mutual leverage more than trust, and it drags both men into Seung Gyu's world, a gangster running an identity-laundering operation that erases homeless and vulnerable people and repurposes their identities.

A detective named Park Sun-Yong is chasing a related thread: an unidentified woman's body pulled from the Han River, and an anonymous tip that keeps pointing him toward Moon-jae's address.

The deeper they dig, the more the story splits into two versions of the past. The version that Moon-Jae tells: a manipulative outsider named Yu-Min wormed into his college writing club, stole his notebook, and later reinvented himself as "the Rat" out of envy. The real one: Yu-min was the actually talented writer. Moon-Jae was the envious one. When Yu-min and Min-Young got together, Moon-Jae destroyed her out of jealousy with anonymous rumors, driving her to suicide, then lifted Yu-Min's unpublished work wholesale and built his entire career on it.

Yu-Min sold his own identity into Seunggyu's laundering network, faked his death, had surgery to become Moon-Jae's doppelgänger, and spent years methodically stepping into his victim's life; his name, his money, his public image, while Moon-Jae's guilt and mental illness made him an easy target to frame.

Moon-Jae's parents once adopted a five-year-old and named him Moon-Jae, only to return him to the orphanage the moment they were able to conceive a biological son, to whom they gave the exact same name. That discarded child was Detective Park Sun-Yong.

It all converges on a cruise ship, where Moon-jae finally corners "the Rat" and gets Yu-min's side of the story in full, followed by a fight that ends with Yu-min being pushed off the cruise into the sea.

Moon-Jae’s editor hands him Yu-Min's unfinished manuscript for a sequel that would name him as the real impostor if it's ever finished. He can't write a single line of it himself, the talent was borrowed all along and as guilt curdles into hallucination, he starts seeing Yu-Min watching him from outside his window. The series closes on a knock at the door: Seung Gyu, still owed his money, still out there.

== Cast and characters ==
=== Main ===
- Ryu Jun-yeol as Je Moon-jae, a novelist
- Sul Kyung-gu as No-ja, a loan shark
- Lee Kyu-hyung as Sun-yong, a detective

=== Supporting ===
- Park Yoon-ho as Seo Yu-min, Moon-Jae's college classmate
- Song Su-yi as Min-yeong, Yu-min's girlfriend
- Moo Jin-sung as Son Su-hyeon, Moon-jae's friend
- Lee El as Han Ji-hye, the editor-in-chief
- Jung Hee-tae as Kim Han-su, Chief of the Detective Division
- Lee Chan-yong as Min-ho, a detective
- Lee Kwan-hoon as Dong-cheol, a detective
- Shin Soo-ho as Han Chang-u, a detective
- Kim Sung-oh as Park Seung-gyu, the ringleader of multiple illegal activities
- Shin Chang-joo as Byeong-jun, Seung-gyu's subordinate
- Kang Bin as Byeong-ho, Seung-gyu's subordinate

== Production ==
=== Development and filming ===
Initially developed under the working title The Rat, it is a television adaptation of the Kakao Webtoon's Field Mouse by Ludovico, which was inspired by the traditional Korean folktale about a rat that assumes a human form by consuming human fingernails. Produced by Kakao Entertainment, C-JeS Studios, H House and Studio PIM, directed by Kim Hong-sun, who helmed the first season of Voice (2017), The Guest (2018), Money Heist: Korea – Joint Economic Area (2022), and Dear Hongrang (2025), and written by Lee Jae-gon, who penned Special Affairs Team TEN.

Principal photography began in the first half of 2025.

=== Casting ===
In December 2024, Ilgan Sports reported that Ryu Jun-yeol and Sul Kyung-gu were in talks to star in the series. By May 2025, Ryu and Sul were confirmed to lead the cast. Moon Jong-il and Go Hyung-woo were cast in supporting roles in December 2025.

== Release ==
Mousetrap was first unveiled in January 2026, as part of Netflix Korea 2026 Slate and announced for a third quarter of 2026 release window. By the end of July 2026, Netflix confirmed that the series is scheduled to premiere on August 28.
