= SLL (South Korean company) =

South Korean TV series production company

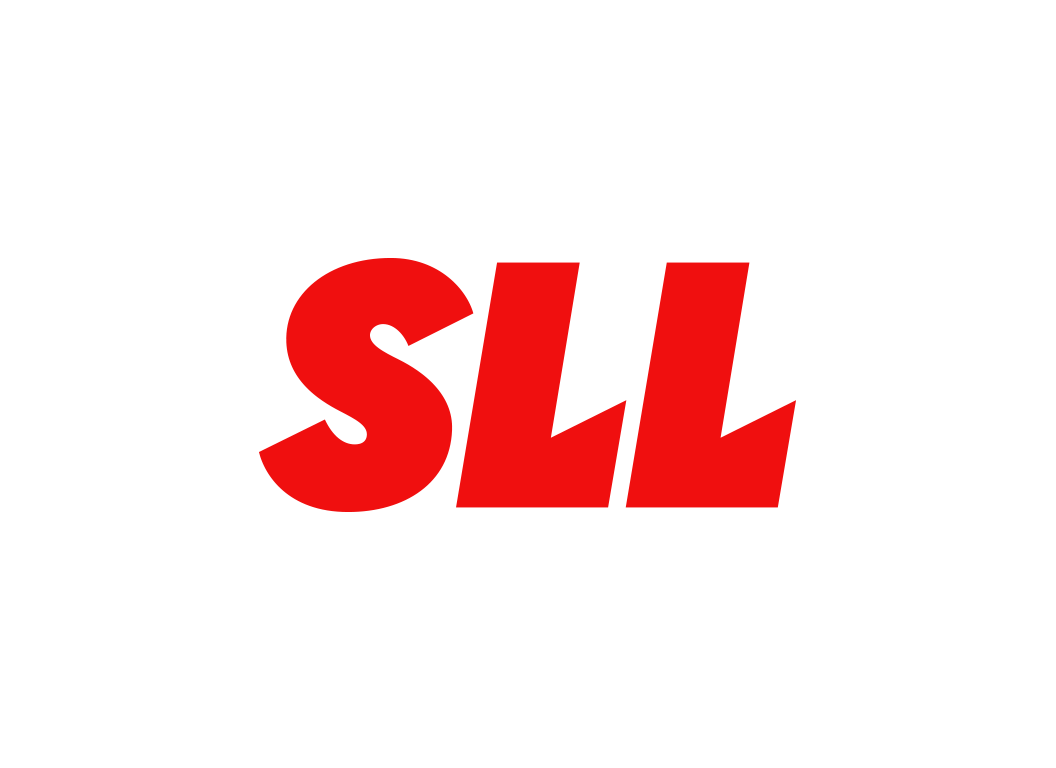
- Logo since 2023
- Type: Private subsidiary
- Industry: Entertainment; Media production
- Founded: September 1, 1999; 27 years ago in Seoul, as Cyber JoongAng
- Headquarters: Sangamsan-ro 38, Sangam-dong, Mapo-gu, Seoul, South Korea
- Area served: Worldwide
- Key people: Yun Ki-yun (CEO); Joonsuh Park (Note: Also the concurrent CEO of Drama House Studio.) (Head of SLL's production division, Executive Vice President)
- Products: Television series; Film production
- Services: Production; Distribution
- Owner: Contentree JoongAng: 53.71%; Praxis Capital Partners: 18.36%; Tencent: 10.11%; Hong Jeong-do: 4.00%; JTBC: 2.84%; JoongAng Holdings: 1.80%; Hong Jeong-in: 1.18%; Other shareholders: 8.00%
- Parent: JoongAng Group
- Subsidiaries: See subsidiaries
- Website: sll.co.kr

SLL (Korean: 에스엘엘중앙), formerly known as JTBC Studios (Korean: 제이티비씨스튜디오), is a South Korean drama production, distribution and talent management company. The company operates as a subsidiary of the JoongAng Group.

== History ==
Originally established as JTBC Studios, the company underwent a significant rebranding in 2023, adopting the name SLL as part of a strategic initiative to expand its Korean content presence globally. The acronym SLL stands for "Stories Lead Life," reflecting the corporate philosophy that "stories lead lives and bring change to the world." The name was derived from the company's previously existing multimedia production house, "Studio Lululala."

In March 2024, SLL appointed Yun Ki-yun as its Chief Executive Officer (CEO). In May, Park Jun-seo, head of SLL JoongAng's production division and TV Asahi 's Vice President Toru Takeda signed a memorandum of understanding to collaborate on the development and production of content business.

== Subsidiaries ==
=== Currently managed ===
- Drama House Studio
- B.A. Entertainment
- Film Monster
- Studio Phoenix
- Production H
- Climax Studio (formerly Lezhin Studio)
- Anthology Studios
- Perfect Storm Film
- Studio Slam (for unscripted shows)
- High-Zium Studio (formerly Zium Content)
- Vird Studio (also serves as visual effects supervisor)
- wiip (founded by Paul Lee, based in the United States)
- UNCORE (with YG Plus)

=== Formerly managed ===
- Betty and Creators
- How Pictures
- Npio Entertainment

== Production works ==
=== Television series ===
Denotes works that have not yet been released.

Year	Title	Channel/Platform	Associated Production	Ref.
2020	The World of the Married	JTBC	BBC Studios	
2020	Graceful Friends	JTBC	Studio&NEW; JCN	
2020	The Good Detective	JTBC	Blossom Story	
2020	More Than Friends	JTBC	Zium Contents	
2020	Was It Love?	JTBC	Gill Pictures	
2020	18 Again	JTBC		
2020	Live On	JTBC	KeyEast; Playlist Studio	
2020	Hush	JTBC	KeyEast	
2021	Beyond Evil	JTBC	Celltrion Entertainment	
2021	Sisyphus: The Myth	JTBC	Drama House Studio	
2021	Law School	JTBC	Studio Phoenix; Gonggamdong House	
2021	Undercover	JTBC	Story TV	
2021	My Roommate Is a Gumiho	tvN	Studio Dragon; Zium Content; iQIYI	
2021	Monthly Magazine Home	JTBC	Drama House Studio	
2021	Nevertheless	JTBC	Studio N; Beyond J	
2021	Reflection of You	JTBC	Celltrion Entertainment	
2021–2022	Snowdrop	JTBC	Drama House Studio	
2021–2022	Artificial City	JTBC	History D&C	
2021–2022	The One and Only	JTBC	KeyEast	
2022	All of Us Are Dead	Netflix	Film Monster; Kim Jong-hak Production	
2022	Thirty-Nine	JTBC	Lotte Cultureworks	
2022	Forecasting Love and Weather	JTBC	NPIO Entertainment	
2022	Green Mothers' Club	JTBC	Megaphone	
2022	It's Beautiful Now	KBS2	Zium Content	
2022	My Liberation Notes	JTBC	Studio Phoenix; Chorokbaem Media	
2022	The Sound of Magic	Netflix	Zium Content	
2022	Rose Mansion	TVING	B.A. Entertainment; Film Monster	
2022	Cleaning Up	JTBC	Drama House Studio	
2022	Insider	JTBC	Ace Factory	
2022	Roppongi Class	TV Asahi	TV Asahi; Kakao Entertainment; Kross Pictures; As Birds	
2022	The Empire	JTBC	Celltrion Entertainment	
2022	Reborn Rich	JTBC	RaemongRaein; Viu (production investment)	
2022	The Interest of Love	JTBC		
2023	Agency	JTBC	How Pictures; Drama House Studio	
2023	Divorce Attorney Shin	JTBC	Higround; Geulmoe	
2023	Doctor Cha	JTBC	Studio&NEW; JCN	
2023	The Good Bad Mother	JTBC	Drama House Studio; Film Monster	
2023	King the Land	JTBC	NPIO Entertainment; By4m Studio	
2023	Miracle Brothers	JTBC	MI	
2023	Behind Your Touch	JTBC	Studio Phoenix	
2023	Destined With You	JTBC	C-JeS Entertainment	
2023	Strong Girl Nam-soon	JTBC	Story Phoenix; Barunson C&C	
2023–2024	Welcome to Samdal-ri	JTBC	MI	
2023–2024	Death's Game	TVING	Studio N; Saram Entertainment	
2024	Doctor Slump	JTBC	HighZium Studio	
2024	Queen of Divorce	JTBC	How Pictures; Drama House Studio	
2024	Hide	Coupang Play; JTBC	CJ ENM Studios; DK E&M	
2024	Frankly Speaking	JTBC	KeyEast	
2024	The Atypical Family	JTBC	Story & Pictures Media; Drama House Studio	
2024	My Military Valentine	Viki	Purple Cats Film	
2024	My Sweet Mobster	JTBC	Base Story; IOK Company	
2024	Miss Night and Day	JTBC	Samhwa Networks	
2024	The Frog	Netflix	Studio Flow	
2024	Family by Choice	JTBC	HighZium Studio; Base Story	
2024	A Virtuous Business	JTBC	HighZium Studio; 221b	
2024–2025	The Tale of Lady Ok	JTBC	Corpus Korea	
2024–2025	Namib	ENA; Genie TV	Studio Wooyoungsoo	
2025	The Scandal of Chunhwa	TVING	Beyond J	
2025	The Art of Negotiation	JTBC	B.A. Entertainment	
2025	Mamono	TV Asahi	TV Asahi; Horipro	
2025	Heavenly Ever After	JTBC	Studio Phoenix	
2025	Shark: The Storm	TVING	Toyou Dream	
2025	Good Boy	JTBC	Studio&NEW; Drama House Studio	
2025	Low Life	Disney+	Playgram; ForEntertainment; Heungbune Bakssine; Why Works Entertainment	
2025	The Nice Guy	JTBC	Higround; Hive Media Corp.	
2025	Beyond the Bar	JTBC	B.A. Entertainment; Studio S; Story Allum Corporation	
2025	My Youth	JTBC	HighZium Studio	
2025	A Hundred Memories	JTBC		
2025	The Dream Life of Mr. Kim	JTBC	Drama House Studio; Varo Entertainment	
2025	Surely Tomorrow	JTBC	Glmoe; Studios IN	
2025	Love Me	JTBC	How Pictures	
2025	Cashero	Netflix	Drama House Studio	
2026	The Art of Sarah	Netflix		
2026	The Practical Guide to Love	JTBC		
2026	Still Shining	JTBC	Kakao Entertainment	
2026	Climax	ENA/Genie TV	KT Studio Genie; Hive Media Corp; TME Group	
2026	We Are All Trying Here	JTBC	Studio Phoenix; Studio Flow	
2026	Reborn Rookie	JTBC	Copus Korea	
2026	The Apartment Job	JTBC	Rednine Pictures	
2026	Salon de Nabi	JTBC	GnG Production	
2026	Shayad Yahi Hai Pyaar	Colors TV	Dice Media/Pocket Aces Pictures	
2026	Final Table	JTBC	B.A. Entertainment; DZoongFilm	
2026	Gold Digger	JTBC	HighZium Studio; 221B; Gleline	
2026	Sacred Jewel	JTBC	Celltrion Entertainment	
TBA	Unfriend	TVING	Anthology Studio; Yong Film	
TBA	Knock-Off	Disney+	Arc Media	

=== Films ===
Year	Title	Associated Production	Distributor	Ref.
2021	Shark : The beginning	SLL · Toyou's Dream	CJ Entertainment · TVING	
2021	The Cursed: Dead Man's Prey	Climax Studio	ABO Entertainment · Plus M Entertainment	
2021	Spiritwalker	Saram Entertainment · BA Entertainment	ABO Entertainment · Plus M Entertainment	
2022	The Roundup	Bigpunch Pictures · Hong Film · BA Entertainment	ABO Entertainment · Plus M Entertainment	
2022	Men of Plastic	Bigpunch Pictures · Hong Film · BA Entertainment	Showbox	
2023	The Devil's Deal	Twinfilm Inc. B.A Entertainment	Plus M Entertainment	
2023	Soulmate	Climax Studio	Next Entertainment World	
2023	Rebound	BA Entertainment; Workhouse Company	Barunson E&A	
2023	The Roundup: No Way Out	Bigpunch Pictures · Hong Film · BA Entertainment	ABO Entertainment · Plus M Entertainment	
2023	Concrete Utopia	Climax Studio · BH Entertainment	Lotte Entertainment	
2023	Cobweb	Anthology Studio · BA Entertainment	Barunson E&A	
2023	Road to Boston	Saetbyul Media; BA Entertainment; Big Picture	Lotte Entertainment	
2023	Open the Door	Contents Panda · BA Entertainment · Contents Lab Vivo		
2024	The Roundup: Punishment	Bigpunch Pictures · Hong Film · BA Entertainment	ABO Entertainment · Plus M Entertainment	
2024	Hijack 1971	Perfect Storm Film · Channel Plus Corp.	Sony Pictures Entertainment Korea · Kidari Studio	

=== Unscripted ===
Year	Title	Associated Production	Distributor	Ref.
2024	Famous Singers and Street Judges	Studio SLAM	TVING	
2024	Culinary Class Wars	Studio SLAM	Netflix	
2024	PROJECT 7	Studio SLAM	Netflix	
2024	Crime Scene Zero	Studio SLAM	Netflix	
2025	Just Makeup	Studio SLAM	Coupang Play	
2025	Sing Again 4	Studio SLAM	JTBC	
TBA	Sell Me the Show	Studio SLAM		

=== Music ===
Year	Artist	Album	Distributor
2025	Close Your Eyes	mini 1st Album : Eternalt	Uncore
2025	Close Your Eyes	mini 2nd Album : Snowy Summer	Uncore
