= Drama House Studio =

South Korean TV production company

- Native name: 드라마하우스 스튜디오
- Formerly: Drama House
- Company type: Subsidiary
- Industry: Entertainment
- Founded: Drama house (October 23, 2007); Drama House Studio (July 22, 2020)
- Headquarters: South korea
- Key people: Joonsuh Park (Note: Also the concurrent executive vice-president and head of the production division of SLL.) (CEO)
- Products: Korean drama, Flim
- Services: Production
- Owner: JoongAng Group
- Parent: SLL
- Website: DramaHouse.co.kr

Drama House Studio (Korean: 드라마하우스 스튜디오) is a South Korean production company, a subsidiary of SLL, founded in 2007 as a drama production company for JTBC. It is part of JoongAng Group.

== History ==
Founded in 2007, the company was the main producer of JTBC channel series.

In 2020, JTBC Studios (SLL is currently known) was established and Drama House Studio became one of its subsidiaries among several studios.

== Production works ==
=== Drama ===
| Year | Title | Network | Associated Production | Ref. |
|---|---|---|---|---|
| 2008 | Painter of the Wind | SBS TV | IS Plus Corp. | |
| 2010 | Master of Study | KBS2 | —N/a | |
| 2011 | Insu, the Queen Mother | JTBC | —N/a | |
| 2012 | How Long I've Kissed | JTBC | QTV | |
| 2012 | Love Again | JTBC | —N/a | |
| 2012 | To My Beloved | JTBC | QTV | |
| 2012–23 | Can We Get Married? | JTBC | —N/a | |
| 2013 | Flower of Revenge | JTBC | —N/a | |
| 2013 | The End of the World | JTBC | —N/a | |
| 2013 | Blooded Palace: The War of Flowers | JTBC | —N/a | |
| 2013 | Empire of Gold | SBS TV | SBS | |
| 2013 | Your Neighbor's Wife | JTBC | DRM Media | |
| 2013–14 | Can't Stand Anymore | JTBC | JS Pictures | |
| 2014 | Can We Fall in Love, Again? | JTBC | Curtain Call Inc.; Red Rover | |
| 2014 | The Noblesse | JTBC | —N/a | |
| 2014 | Secret Affair (TV series) | JTBC | Future One | |
| 2014 | 12 Years Promise | JTBC | —N/a | |
| 2014 | Steal Heart | JTBC | —N/a | |
| 2014–15 | More Than a Maid | JTBC | —N/a | |
| 2015 | My Love Eun Dong | JTBC | Creative Contents Company "Mongjakso" | |
| 2015 | Last | JTBC | AStory | |
| 2016 | Madame Antoine: The Love Therapist | JTBC | GnG Production | |
| 2016 | My Horrible Boss | JTBC | Samhwa Networks | |
| 2016 | Secret Healer | JTBC | Apollo Pictures; Media & Art | |
| 2016 | Hello, My Twenties! | JTBC | Dream E&M | |
| 2016 | Fantastic | JTBC | AStory | |
| 2016 | Listen to Love | JTBC | —N/a | |
| 2017 | Strong Girl Bong-soon | JTBC | JS Pictures | |
| 2017 | Man to Man | JTBC | Mountain Movement Story | |
| 2017 | The Lady in Dignity | JTBC | JS Pictures | |
| 2017 | A Person You May Know | JTBC | —N/a | |
| 2017 | Hello, My Twenties! 2 | JTBC | Take 2 Media Group | |
| 2017 | Hip Hop Teacher | JTBC | —N/a | |
| 2017 | Somehow 18 | JTBC | —N/a | |
| 2017 | The Package | JTBC | JYP Pictures | |
| 2017 | Last-Minute Romance | JTBC | Live Motion Pictures | |
| 2017–18 | Untouchable | JTBC | Kim Jong-hak Production | |
| 2018 | Welcome to Waikiki | JTBC | C-JeS Studios | |
| 2018 | Something in the Rain | JTBC | Content K | |
| 2018 | Sketch | JTBC | Neo Entertainment | |
| 2018–19 | Clean with Passion for Now | JTBC | Oh Brothers Production | |
| 2018–19 | Sky Castle | JTBC | HB Entertainment | |
| 2019 | Drama Stage Season 2: Like a Dog, Like a Beggar, Beautiful | tvN | Studio Dragon | |
| 2019 | The Light in Your Eyes | JTBC | —N/a | |
| 2019 | Welcome to Waikiki 2 | JTBC | C-JeS Studios | |
| 2019 | The Wind Blows | JTBC | Salt Light Media | |
| 2019 | At Eighteen | JTBC | KeyEast | |
| 2019–20 | Chocolate | JTBC | JYP Entertainment | |
| 2020 | Was It Love? | JTBC | Gill Pictures | |
| 2021 | Sisyphus: The Myth | JTBC | JTBC Studios | |
| 2021 | Monthly Magazine Home | JTBC | JTBC Studios | |
| 2021 | My Roommate Is a Gumiho | tvN | Studio Dragon; Zium Content | |
| 2021 | Lost | JTBC | C-JeS Studios | |
| 2021–22 | Snowdrop | JTBC | JTBC Studios | |
| 2022 | Cleaning Up | JTBC | SLL | |
| 2022 | It's Beautiful Now | KBS2 | SLL; Zium Content | |
| 2023 | Agency | JTBC | SLL; How Pictures | |
| 2023 | The Good Bad Mother | JTBC | SLL; Film Monster | |
| 2024 | Queen of Divorce | JTBC | SLL; How Pictures | |
| 2024 | The Atypical Family | JTBC | SLL; Story & Pictures Media | |
| 2025 | The Art of Negotiation | JTBC | SLL; B.A Entertainment | |
| 2025 | Good Boy | JTBC | SLL; Studio&NEW | |
| 2025 | The Dream Life of Mr. Kim | JTBC | SLL; Varo Entertainment | |
| 2025 | Cashero | Netflix | SLL | |

=== Film ===
| Year | Distributor | Title | Co-producer | Ref. |
|---|---|---|---|---|
| 2018 | Lotte Entertainment | Intimate Strangers | Film Monster | |
