= The Dream Life of Mr. Kim =

2025 South Korean television series

- Promotional poster
- Also known as: The Story Of Manager Kim
- Hangul: 서울 자가에 대기업 다니는 김 부장 이야기
- Lit.: The Story of Manager Kim, Who Lives in Seoul and Works for a Large Corporation
- RR: Seoul jagae daegieop danineun Gim bujang iyagi
- MR: Sŏul chagaë taegiŏp taninŭn Kim pujang iyagi
- Genre: Workplace comedy; Slice-of-life
- Based on: The Story of Manager Kim, Who Lives in Seoul and Works at a Large Corporation by Song Hee-gu
- Written by: Kim Hong-gi; Yoon Hye-sung
- Directed by: Cho Hyun-tak
- Starring: Ryu Seung-ryong; Myung Se-bin; Cha Kang-yoon
- Music by: Jung Jae-hyung
- Country of origin: South Korea
- Original language: Korean
- No. of episodes: 12

Production
- Running time: 60–70 minutes
- Production companies: SLL; Drama House Studio; VARO Entertainment

Original release
- Network: JTBC
- Release: October 25 – November 30, 2025

The Dream Life of Mr. Kim (Korean: 서울 자가에 대기업 다니는 김 부장 이야기) is a 2025 South Korean television series starring Ryu Seung-ryong, Myung Se-bin, and Cha Kang-yoon. Based on the novel of the same title by Song Hee-gu, it aired on JTBC from October 25, to November 30, 2025, every Saturday at 22:40 (KST) and Sunday at 22:30 (KST). It also streams globally on Netflix.

== Synopsis ==
The drama follows Director Kim, who begins work at a large company in Seoul, navigating both corporate politics and personal challenges.

== Cast ==
=== Main ===
- Ryu Seung-ryong as Kim Nak-soo

A veteran sales manager who built his life on success now faces the slow collapse of everything he has earned.

- Myung Se-bin as Park Ha-jin

Nak-soo's devoted wife who always lived in his shadow now decides to build her own future.

- Cha Kang-yoon as Kim Soo-gyeom

Nak-soo's son who rejects his father's path, chasing freedom in a startup.

=== Supporting ===
==== People at ACT ====
- Yoo Seung-mok as Baek Jeong-tae

An executive who rose through office politics, outwardly loyal to Nak-soo but driven enough to betray him for his own ambition.

- Lee Shin-ki as Do Jin-woo

A sharp manager who rose quickly and quietly aligns with power to secure his place at the top.

- Lee Seo-hwan as Heo Tae-hwan

A kind but slow-working longtime employee, stuck as a perpetual mid-level manager.

- Shin Dong-won as Song Ik-hyeon

A dependable worker who sometimes acts as Nak-soo's right-hand man.

- Jeong Sun-won as Jeong Seong-gu

A mid-level employee who dislikes Nak-soo's old-fashioned behavior, but finds himself mirroring him.

- Ha Seo-yoon as Kwon Song-hee

A young employee who questions authority and corporate nonsense.

==== People at Soo-gyeom's startup ====
- Lee Jin-yi as Lee Han-na

Soo-gyeom's first love in middle school.

- Kim Su-gyeom as Lee Jeong-hwan

A charismatic startup founder who hides ruthless ambition behind charm.

==== Park Ha-jin's family ====
- Lee Se-hee as Park Ha-young

Ha-jin's younger sister.

- Lee Kang-wook as Han Sang-cheol

Ha-young's husband and successful fintech CEO.

==== People around Kim Nak-soo ====
- Ko Chang-seok as Kim Chang-soo

Nak-soo's older brother and humble auto shop owner.

- Park Soo-young as Nom-Peong-ah

Nak-soo's childhood friend who knows him better than anyone else.

=== Special appearance ===
- Jung Eun-chae as Lee Joo-young

== Production ==
The series is directed by Cho Hyun-tak, known for Sky Castle (2018), Snowdrop (2021), The Atypical Family (2024), and written by Kim Hong-gi and Yoon Hye-sung. The series is produced by SLL, Drama House Studio, and VARO Entertainment.

It is based on the novel of the same title by Song Hee-gu, which was published in 2021 by Seosamdok Publishing House.

== Viewership ==
The Dream Life of Mr. Kim : South Korea viewers per episode (millions)

Season	Episode number												Average
Season	1	2	3	4	5	6	7	8	9	10	11	12	Average
1	0.736	0.895	0.781	0.800	0.861	1.129	0.845	1.166	1.125	1.328	1.306	1.935	1.076

Source: Audience measurement performed nationwide by Nielsen Korea.

Average TV viewership ratings
Ep.	Original broadcast date	Average audience share	
Ep.	Original broadcast date	(Nielsen Korea)	
Ep.	Original broadcast date	Nationwide	Seoul
1	October 25, 2025	2.894% (1st)	3.068% (1st)
2	October 26, 2025	3.540% (1st)	3.508% (1st)
3	November 1, 2025	3.159% (1st)	3.380% (1st)
4	November 2, 2025	3.399% (1st)	4.074% (1st)
5	November 8, 2025	3.564% (1st)	3.907% (1st)
6	November 9, 2025	4.678% (1st)	5.563% (1st)
7	November 15, 2025	3.411% (1st)	4.082% (1st)
8	November 16, 2025	4.731% (1st)	5.506% (1st)
9	November 22, 2025	4.559% (1st)	5.462% (1st)
10	November 23, 2025	5.433% (1st)	6.012% (1st)
11	November 29, 2025	5.591% (1st)	5.694% (1st)
12	November 30, 2025	7.567% (1st)	8.118% (1st)
Average		4.377%	4.865%
In the table above, the blue numbers represent the lowest ratings and the red numbers represent the highest ratings.; This drama airs on a cable channel/pay TV which normally has a relatively smaller audience compared to free-to-air TV/public broadcasters (KBS, SBS, MBC, and EBS).

== Accolades ==
Award ceremony	Year	Category	Nominee	Result	Ref.
Baeksang Arts Awards	2026	Grand Prize – Television	Ryu Seung-ryong	Won	
Baeksang Arts Awards	2026	Best Actor	Ryu Seung-ryong	Nominated	
Baeksang Arts Awards	2026	Best Drama	The Dream Life of Mr. Kim	Nominated	
Baeksang Arts Awards	2026	Best Director	Cho Hyun-tak	Nominated	
Baeksang Arts Awards	2026	Best Supporting Actor	Yoo Seung-mok	Won	
Baeksang Arts Awards	2026	Best Supporting Actress	Myung Se-bin	Nominated	
Cine21 Awards	2026	Series Category – Actor of the Year	Ryu Seung-ryong	Won	
Seoul International Drama Awards	2026	Best Mini-Series	The Dream Life of Mr. Kim	Won	
Seoul International Drama Awards	2026	Outstanding Korean Drama	The Dream Life of Mr. Kim	Won	
Seoul International Drama Awards	2026	Best Actor	Ryu Seung-ryong	Won	
