= Cashero =

2025 South Korean television series

- Promotional poster
- Hangul: 캐셔로
- RR: Kaesyeoro
- MR: K'aesyŏro
- Genre: Superhero
- Based on: Cashero by Team Befar
- Written by: Lee Jae-in; Jeon Chan-ho
- Directed by: Lee Chang-min
- Starring: Lee Jun-ho; Kim Hye-jun; Kim Byung-chul; Kim Hyang-gi
- Country of origin: South Korea
- Original language: Korean
- No. of episodes: 8

Production
- Running time: 47–60 minutes
- Production companies: SLL; Drama House Studio

Original release
- Network: Netflix
- Release: December 26, 2025

Cashero (Korean: 캐셔로) is a 2025 South Korean television series directed by Lee Chang-min, written by Lee Jae-in and Jeon Chan-ho, and starring Lee Jun-ho, Kim Hye-jun, Kim Byung-chul, and Kim Hyang-gi. The series is based on the Kakao webtoon of the same name by Lee Hoon and No Hye-ok, together known as "Team Befar". It was released on Netflix on December 26, 2025.

== Synopsis ==
Kang Sang-woong is a modest civil servant who gains superpowers tied to how much cash he carries. As he teams up with allies including his real life girlfriend, a lawyer whose powers activate when drinking, and a calorie-fueled psychic, they battle a mysterious group targeting heroes.

== Cast ==
=== Main ===
- Lee Jun-ho as Kang Sang-woong

An ordinary civil servant who acquires the special ability to gain strength equivalent to the amount of cash he possesses.

- Kim Hye-jun as Kim Min-sook

Sang-woong's long-time girlfriend and fiancée. She is a realistic person who finds Sang-woong's superpower inefficient but supports him more than anyone else.

- Kim Hyang-gi as Bang Eun-mi

A young woman with telekinetic powers, which are fueled by the amount of calories she intakes.

- Kim Byung-chul as Byeon Ho-in

A lawyer whose superpower is triggered by drinking alcohol. He is also the self-appointed chief of a Korean organization for people with supernatural powers.

=== Supporting ===
- Kang Han-na as Jo Anna

The daughter of a chaebol family.

- Lee Chae-min as Jo Nathan

The son of a chaebol family and Anna's brother.

- Kim Eui-sung as Jo Won-do

Jo Nathan and Jo Anna's father and leader of the "Criminals' Association".

- Shin Su-hyun as Lee Su-eun

A researcher works at Beomha Group.

- Kim Gook-hee as Park Jung-ja

A loan shark.

- Jang Hyun-sung as Hwang Hyun-sung

A detective.

- Kim Soo-jin as Lee Eun-hui

Sang-woong's mother

- Jung Seung-kil as Kang Dong-gi

Sang-woong's father

=== Special appearances ===
- Jo Bo-ah as Lee Hwa-Jin

A fire-powered superhero.

- Kim Young-ok

Old lady at the subway staircase.

- Kim Won-hae as Do Yeong Nam

== Production ==
=== Development ===
Director Lee Chang-min described Cashero as a distinct, reality-oriented take on the superhero genre. He noted that the series intentionally avoids the Marvel style, instead emphasizing the ironic premise of "an ordinary man who can use superpowers only to the extent of his financial means". Lee explained that he aimed to create a relatable, grounded work, shaping it to feel "connected yet deliberately distinct" in its approach.

=== Filming ===
On April 18, 2024, Netflix confirmed the production of the show and shared photos from the script reading. Cashero began filming in December 2023. It is based on the webtoon of the same name and produced by SLL and Drama House Studio. The series wrapped filming in late 2024.

== Episodes ==
No.	Title	Original release date
1	"Episode 1"	December 26, 2025
Kang Sang-ung, a cash-strapped office worker, hopes to buy a home with his practical girlfriend Min-suk, whose strict approach to money clashes with his sentimental nature. Sang-ung's father, deeply in debt, passes on a family power that lets its user help others at the cost of their own cash, replaced by coins. Min-suk tests the limits of the ability and imposes strict rules, causing Sang-ung to behave unnaturally at work. When he encounters a kind seller attacked by bullies, fear of losing money keeps him from helping, leaving him guilt-ridden. Later, his mother provides 30 million won from her savings, and when a bus is on the verge of falling off a bridge, Sang-ung acts, saving the passengers as his money vanishes and his rashes disappear, earning praise from bystanders.
2	"Episode 2"	December 26, 2025
Lee Hwa-jin, a fire-powered woman, is captured by the elitist Jo Anna, who extracts her abilities for her experiments. Sang-ung faces harassment in police custody until the loan shark Jeong-ja intervenes, revealing his father's massive debt. Jeong-ja tests Sang-ung's power and proposes a forced marriage arrangement. Meanwhile, Anna's forces target Sang-ung directly, destroying his apartment and causing Min-suk to leave. When she attends a hotel wedding targeted by Anna, Sang-ung drains his savings to reach her and rescues her from an explosion, angering her by using their money. Their reconciliation is interrupted when Anna's enhanced bodyguard attacks, but Sang-ung manages to fight back using wedding gift money as Ho-in and Eun-mi, part of a superhuman society, arrive.
3	"Episode 3"	December 26, 2025
Sang-ung wakes at Ho-in and Eun-mi's home, learning his power drains into money containers when used. The duo reveal the Mundane Vanguard, a wealthy non-powered organization led by the Jo family, is now targeting him. Jo Won-do murders his father and orders Anna to capture Sang-ung. Sang-ung reluctantly joins Ho-in's team, training to fight without relying on his costly powers and adopting a masked identity. He quietly helps others, regaining confidence, while Min-suk supports him financially and emotionally, revealing their marriage. During a volunteer mission, they meet a prophetic superhuman who warns of Sang-ung's potential downfall. When the Vanguard ambushes them, Sang-ung confronts Anna's bodyguard, and both fall into flames.
4	"Episode 4"	December 26, 2025
Sang-ung survives his fall by incapacitating the enhanced bodyguard in a pond. Jo Won-do contacts him, offering to buy his power, creating moral conflict. Detective Hwang investigates, noting Sang-ung's coins, loan records, and marriage. Sang-ung confronts his father about the Mundane Vanguard and learns Ho-in has concealed that most superhumans have already sold their powers. Discovering the high value of his ability and predicting his potential betrayal, Sang-ung agrees to sell his power, indulging briefly in generosity. As police scrutiny and multiple factions converge, Sang-ung reaches Beomha Ranch to finalize the deal but hesitates at the extraction, forcing Ho-in to intervene with gunfire.
5	"Episode 5"	December 26, 2025
Ho-in and Eun-mi intervene, rescuing Sang-ung during the extraction. Using money as a weapon, he fends off Anna's forces, revealing the trio had pretended to fight during a truce to infiltrate the lab and gather evidence. They steal confidential files detailing illegal superpower experiments and flee, though Sang-ung loses the promised funds. Nathan manipulates events behind the scenes, moving the extracted powers. Facing work penalties, police scrutiny, and Min-suk's quiet sacrifices, Sang-ung continues. Nathan orchestrates a drug deal to lure him into a trap, resulting in chaos at a club where the trio retrieves a bag of drugs amid civilians' interference.
6	"Episode 6"	December 26, 2025
Anna storms the lab to recover the missing ampoules, suspecting Nathan. At the club, Sang-ung avoids capture and is escorted to a family dinner by Ho-in and Eun-mi, though Detective Hwang arrests him after questioning Min-suk. Nathan reveals he orchestrated previous disasters to manipulate Sang-ung, threatening Min-suk to ensure compliance. Anna proposes a temporary alliance, directing the trio to steal ampoules from Gimhae Bank to destroy Nathan, though her hidden plan aims to claim the powers herself. Min-suk secures a risky loan to support Sang-ung, who insists on the mission. They infiltrate the bank as armed security confronts them.
7	"Episode 7"	December 26, 2025
Inside Gimhae Bank, Sang-ung distracts security while Ho-in enters the vault, but Nathan, Su-yeon, and armed men ambush them. Sang-ung uses Won-do's hidden funds to fight back but is ultimately incapacitated when overextending his power. He awakens in Detective Hwang's car, who warns him to abandon vigilantism. Anna briefly gains the ampoules but is intercepted by Jeong-ja. Sang-ung, disillusioned with money, understands his power comes from purpose and leaps from Beomha Logistics toward Nathan to rescue Min-suk. Meanwhile, Nathan kidnaps her to force Sang-ung's compliance.
8	"Episode 8"	December 26, 2025
Sang-ung, with Ho-in and Eun-mi, fights the Mundane Vanguard at Beomha Logistics as Nathan plans to trap Min-suk in a bombed elevator to force Sang-ung to surrender his abilities. Sang-ung drags Nathan into the elevator and detonates it, seemingly dying, but Min-suk rewinds time with Hwang's power to save him, though Nathan also survives. Nathan injects himself with all stolen powers, rampages, and kills Anna. Sang-ung rallies civilians, Min-suk, and the police to power up with money, defeating Nathan. In the aftermath, Jeong-ja exposes Won-do's corruption, heroes rebuild, Eun-mi reunites with Hwa-jin, Ho-in reconnects with his daughter, and Sang-ung and Min-suk purchase an apartment, learning she is pregnant.

== Release and promotion ==
On February 4, 2025, Netflix announced that Cashero was part of the "Next on Netflix 2025 Korea" content lineup and scheduled to be released in the fourth quarter of 2025. On December 1, Netflix confirmed the release date to be on December 26.

== Reception ==
=== Critical response ===
The series received generally negative reviews from critics, who primarily focused on its narrative execution. Kate Sánchez of But Why Tho? gave the series a 3 out of 10 rating, stating that while the premise had potential, the show was "hindered by poor pacing" and failed to develop its characters beyond their initial archetypes. Similarly, Pierce Conran of the South China Morning Post awarded the series 1.5 out of 5 stars, describing it as a "messy superhero spectacle". Janani K. of India Today rated the production 2.5 out of 5 stars, noting that despite Lee Jun-ho's performance, the drama "struggled to cash in on its idea".

=== Viewership ===
Cashero debuted at number two on Netflix's global non-English rankings in the last week of December, within just two days of release. In its second week, the series rose to the top spot. It continued its run in the Top 10, accumulating 4 weeks on the chart overall.
