= Trigger (South Korean TV series) =

2025 South Korean TV series

- Promotional poster
- Hangul: 트리거
- RR: Teurigeo
- MR: T'ŭrigŏ
- Genre: Action thriller
- Written by: Kwon Oh-seung
- Directed by: Kwon Oh-seung
- Starring: Kim Nam-gil; Kim Young-kwang
- Music by: Hwang Sang-jun
- Country of origin: South Korea
- Original language: Korean
- No. of episodes: 10

Production
- Running time: 37–61 minutes
- Production company: Bidangil Pictures
- Budget: ₩30 billion

Original release
- Network: Netflix
- Release: July 25, 2025

Trigger (Korean: 트리거) is a 2025 South Korean action thriller television series written and directed by Kwon Oh-seung. Starring Kim Nam-gil and Kim Young-kwang, it was released on Netflix on July 25, 2025.

== Synopsis ==
Trigger follows a rise in illegal gun distribution and escalating gun crimes. The story centers on two men—one a righteous police officer, the other a cunning arms dealer—who wield weapons for vastly different reasons.

== Cast ==
=== Main ===
- Kim Nam-gil as Lee Do

A former military sniper turned police officer investigating the illegal firearms trade.

- Kim Young-kwang as Moon Baek
  - Moon Seong-hyun as teen Moon Baek

A mysterious arms dealer with a dual personality and a carefully orchestrated agenda.

- Park Hoon as Koo Jeong-man

The leader of a cleanup squad working for Gong Seok-ho.

=== Supporting ===
- Gil Hae-yeon as Oh Kyung-sook

A mother who is on a one-man protest for her son who died from a work-related accident.

- Kim Won-hae as Jo Hyeon-sik

A police sergeant at Domyeong Police Station and a father figure to Lee Do.

- Woo Ji-hyun as Yoo Jung-tae

A civil service exam candidate.

- Yang Seung-ri as Gong Seok-ho

The boss of the Glory Gang.

- Lee Suk as Jeon Won-seong

A sex offender who has an electronic tag on his ankle.

- Jang Dong-joo as Jang Jung-woo

A police officer and Lee Do's partner.

- Cha Rae-hyung as Seo Hyung-joo

A detective of the Violent Crimes unit of Gyeongin Seobu Police Station.

- Park Yoon-ho as Park Gyu-jin

A bullied student in Jeongil High School.

- Son Bo-seung as Seo Yong-dong

A bullied student in Jeongil High School.

- Hong Min-gi as Kang Seong-joon

A student in Jeongil High School who frequently bullies Gyu-jin and Yong-dong.

- Kim Joong-hee as Wang Dae-hyeon

A freelance reporter who goes on hot pursuit for news of gun crimes and illegal arms distributions.

=== Special appearances ===
- Jung Woong-in as Yoon Won-cheol

A superintendent of Gyeongin Seobu Police Station.

- Jo Han-chul as Chief Joo

The chief of the Violent Crimes unit of Gyeongin Seobu Police Station.

- Lee Ji-hoon as a repairman

Formerly a fellow military comrade of Lee Do.

- Carson Allen as subway rider

== Episodes ==
No.	Title	Directed by	Written by	Original release date
1	"Episode 1"	Kwon Oh-seung	Kwon Oh-seung	July 25, 2025
Yoo Jung-tae, a civil service exam candidate, explains his homicidal ideation to a psychiatrist about him wanting to cause a mass shooting as he is suffering from stress and anxiety. Whilst trying to study for the upcoming civil service exam inside a low-cost shared residential complex, his frustrations reached breaking point when his next-door neighbor has rough sex across his wall and refuses to listen to him. In his fury, he grabs his machine pistol and shoots both the man and their young girlfriend, along with an arrogant video gamer and the ignorant building manager dead. Jung-tae locks the doors of the apartment and asks the shocked inhabitants who ate his anchovies as he maniacally stares down on them.
2	"Episode 2"	Kwon Oh-seung	Kwon Oh-seung	July 25, 2025
Lee Do, a police officer and former ROK Army sniper and his rookie partner, Jang Jung-woo, respond to a nearby shooting. Despite fierce resistance, Lee Do's athleticism and agility allows him to apprehend Jung-tae. The duo discovers a stash of disassembled firearms and parts inside Jung-tae's room, which Lee Do masterfully reassemble them with ease, owing to his military background. In the interrogation room, Jung-tae confesses that the weapons were delivered by a courier. He then angrily rambles to Lee Do about the state of society and warns that there are many other people who desire to have a gun and pull the trigger. Lee Do is notified that Jeon Won-seong, a registered sex offender who is under house arrest, has taken off his ankle monitor and hurries back to their house to search for him, when he stumbles upon a mysterious individual who is there to collect the package.
3	"Episode 3"	Kwon Oh-seung	Kwon Oh-seung	July 25, 2025
Lee Do question a mysterious individual inside Jeon Won-seong's house. The person, who calls himself Moon-baek, explains he saw Weon-seong leaving and he was looking for a package with the K2 assault rifle based on the address list found on his own package he received. Realizing that Weon-seong is armed, Lee Do orders dispatch to track down Weon-seong's last known movements through CCTV, when he spots a man in a red tracksuit running down the alley, whom Moon-baek knocks him unconscious. Lee Do continue to follow Weon-seong's trail with Moon-baek, before they realized that he is targeting Gyeongin Seobu Police Station. Lee Do cuffs Moon-baek by the car as they arrive just as Weong-seok initiates the targeted killing on the station officers. As Lee Do attempts to lure Weon-seong away from the officers, he then makes his way to the evidence room to arm himself his own rifle and shoots at Weon-seong multiple times inside the office. Cornered and laying on the floor bleeding, Weon-seong tries to sneak up on Lee Do's colleagues, but Lee Do executes him with a fatal double-tap, unaware that this act was witnessed by Moon-baek–who had managed to free himself, as well as a freelance reporter, Wang Dae-hyeon, who recorded the footage.
4	"Episode 4"	Kwon Oh-seung	Kwon Oh-seung	July 25, 2025
Lee Do continues searching for the red tracksuit individual, which is revealed to be Jo U-Tae, who works with Gong Seok-ho, the leader of the criminal organization Glory Gang, who has just released from prison. Seok-ho denies that the group is distributing guns, unaware that his underling, Oh Jeong-man, sought a lucrative opportunity for distributing guns behind his back. He then goes to see Moon-baek, who spoke that he has late-stage cancer. He then gives Lee Do the addresses of individuals he could recall. The first address of the person who ordered the gun leads to Oh Kyung-sook, an elderly mother who is protesting for the death of her son, Hwang Min-ju, due to a work-related accident. She goes to confront the CEO with the pistol and seemingly kills him. Upon arriving at Kyung-sook's house, he is confronted by a gang of men led by U-tae, Jeong-man, whom Lee Do and Moon-baek manages to subdue. He finds Kyung-sook in the closet severely injured, and the two rushed her over to the hospital.
5	"Episode 5"	Kwon Oh-seung	Kwon Oh-seung	July 25, 2025
6	"Episode 6"	Kwon Oh-seung	Kwon Oh-seung	July 25, 2025
7	"Episode 7"	Kwon Oh-seung	Kwon Oh-seung	July 25, 2025
8	"Episode 8"	Kwon Oh-seung	Kwon Oh-seung	July 25, 2025
9	"Episode 9"	Kwon Oh-seung	Kwon Oh-seung	July 25, 2025
10	"Episode 10"	Kwon Oh-seung	Kwon Oh-seung	July 25, 2025

== Production ==
The series is written and directed by Kwon Oh-seung, who directed Midnight (2021). Its production budget was about ₩30 billion.

== Reception ==
On the review aggregator website Rotten Tomatoes, 100% of 9 critics' reviews are positive, with an average rating of 7/10.

== See also ==
- Madharaasi, a 2025 Indian film featuring a similar premise of Trigger, regarding India's gun culture and illegal gun distribution
