= Snowdrop (South Korean TV series) =

2021–2022 South Korean television series

- Promotional poster
- Hangul: 설강화
- Hanja: 雪降花
- RR: Seolganghwa
- MR: Sŏlganghwa
- Genre: Romance; Black comedy; Action
- Written by: Yoo Hyun-mi
- Directed by: Jo Hyun-tak
- Starring: Jung Hae-in; Jisoo; Yoo In-na; Jang Seung-jo; Yoon Se-ah; Kim Hye-yoon; Jung Yoo-jin
- Music by: Kim Tae-seong
- Country of origin: South Korea
- Original language: Korean
- No. of episodes: 16

Production
- Executive producers: Lee Hae-kwang; Jeong Da-jeong
- Producers: Park Joon-seo; Park Sang-soo
- Editor: Oh Sang-hwan
- Running time: 70 minutes
- Production companies: Drama House; JTBC Studios

Original release
- Network: JTBC
- Release: December 18, 2021 – January 30, 2022

Snowdrop (Korean: 설강화; RR: Seolganghwa) is a South Korean television series starring Jung Hae-in, Jisoo, Yoo In-na, Jang Seung-jo, Yoon Se-ah, Kim Hye-yoon and Jung Yoo-jin. It aired on JTBC from December 18, 2021, to January 30, 2022, every Saturday and Sunday at 22:30 (KST) for 16 episodes.

== Synopsis ==
Snowdrop takes place in 1987, a pivotal year in South Korean history that included the June 1987 Democracy Movement, a mass protest movement with the purpose of forcing the dictatorship in South Korea to hold fair elections, and the resulting December 1987 democratic elections, which led to the end of the authoritarian Fifth Republic of Korea and the establishment of the democratic Sixth Republic of Korea.

Snowdrop is set in November and December 1987. Lim Soo-ho (Jung Hae-in) plays a graduate student who is found covered in blood by Eun Yeong-ro (Jisoo), a female university student who hides him from the government in her dorm room. However, it is revealed that Soo-ho is not who he appears to be. Against the backdrop of political upheaval, the pair's story unfolds and the two develop a romantic relationship.

== Cast and characters ==
=== Main ===
- Jung Hae-in as Lim Soo-ho (27 years old), formerly named Ri Tae-san, alias Lim Soo-hyeok. He is a North Korean agent with a mission assigned in South Korea. He lives as a graduate student preparing for a master's thesis in the Department of Economics at the University of Berlin. He fell in love with Yeong-ro at first sight.
- Jisoo as Eun Yeong-ro (20 years old), a freshman at Hosu Women's University in the English Literature Department and daughter of Eun Chang-su who is the director of the ANSP. She fell in love with Soo-ho at first sight.
- Yoo In-na as Kang Cheong-A / Kim Eun-Hye (34 years old), a charismatic and skilled surgeon at a university hospital. She is later revealed to be a North Korean spy.
- Jang Seung-jo as Lee Gang-mu (36 years old), the leader of Team One in the Anti-Communist Investigation Bureau, Agency for National Security Planning (ANSP), who seeks to arrest Soo-ho over the death of his colleague. He gets taken hostage by Soo-ho afterward.
- Yoon Se-ah as Pi Seung-hee (43 years old), the housemistress of Hosu Women's University dormitory.
- Kim Hye-yoon as Gye Bun-ok (24 years old), a phone operator at Hosu Women's University dormitory, who could not go to college due to financial issues. She was friends with Yeong-ro but became enemies after accusing her to be the cause of the hostage situation.
- Jung Yoo-jin as Jang Han-na (32 years old), an impulsive, but passionate ANSP agent, who is Gang-mu's junior and fiancée who was left behind six years ago.

=== Supporting ===
==== People around Lim Soo-ho ====
- Kim Min-kyu as Joo Gyeok-chan, a North Korean agent, who is prone to violence.
- Jang In-sub as Lee Eung-cheol, a North Korean agent, who is trusting and friendly towards Soo-ho.
- Heo Nam-jun as Oh Gwang-tae, a friend of Lim Soo-ho and a university student who likes Seol-hui.
- Jeon Moo-song as Lim Ji-rok, the Head of United Front Dept., DPRK and Soo-ho's adoptive father, who adopted both Soo-ho and his sister Soo-hui from a coal mine.
- Jung Ae-ri as Choi Soo-ryeon, the Deputy Director of Ministry of State Security, DPRK.

==== People around Eun Yeong-ro ====
- Huh Joon-ho as Eun Chang-su, the Director of the ANSP and Yeong-ro's father. He truly cares for Yeong-ro despite their strained relationship.
- Kim Jung-nan as Hong Ae-ra, a former film actress, Eun Chang-su's wife and Yeong-ro's stepmother, who has a poor relationship with Yeong-ro.

==== People around Kang Cheong-ya ====
- Park Sung-woong as Nam Tae-il, He is the Secretary-General of the Aemin Party and former Director of the ANSP.
- Ariane Desgagnés-Leclerc as Gong Gil-soon, a longtime friend of Kang Cheong-ya posing as ABK Partners fund manager Linda Young.
- Jung Hye-young as Cho Seong-sim, daughter of a four-star general and Nam Tae-il's wife.

==== People around Hosu Women's Dormitory ====
- Jung Shin-hye as Ko Hye-ryeong, a fourth-year student in the Department of Vocal Music and Yeong-ro's dormmate. Her birth name was Ko Hye-ja before she legally changed her name.
- Kim Mi-soo as Yeo Jeong-min, a fourth-year History major student and Yeong-ro's dormmate, who joined the democratic protests against the authoritarian government.
- Choi Hee-jin as Yoon Seol-hui, a freshman in the Department of Home Management and Yeong-ro's dormmate. She pretends to be a daughter of a rich family when her parents are actually poor.
- Jung Yi-seo as Shin Gyeong-ja, the president of the Dormitory Student Council who frequently sleep walks.
- Ahn Dong-goo as Choi Byung-tae, a military academy cadet who likes Hye-ryeong.
- Kim Jong-soo as Kim Man-dong, a facility manager at Hosu Women's University.
- Kim Jeong-hoon as Kim Sang-beom, Man-dong's son, who has a gambling addiction.
- Nam Mi-jung as Oh Deok-shim, a chef at Hosu Women's University.
- Park Soo-ryun as a student of Hosu Women's University

==== People around Lee Gang-mu and Jang Han-na ====
- Lee Hwa-ryong as Ahn Gyeong-hui, the Chief of the Anti-Communist Investigation Bureau (ANSP), who is later promoted to the Chief of the Office of Planning and Coordination (OPC).
- Baek Ji-won as Choi Mi-hye, a fashion designer and Ahn Gyeong-hui's wife.
- Jang Tae-min as Choi Hui-jun, Eun Chang-su's secretary.
- Moon Yoo-kang as Seung-jun, a member of the ANSP team.
- Choi Kyung-hoon as Oh Dong-jae, a member of the ANSP team.
- Choi Yoon-je as a member of the ANSP team.

==== Others ====
- Park Ye-ni as Kim Ye-ni, a secretary at 'Charmant'.
- Kwon Han-sol as Han-na
- Lee Joo-ahn as Jun-pyo, the son of the President of South Korea.
- Kang Moon-kyung as Park Moo-yeol, a presidential candidate and member of Aemin Party.

=== Cameos ===
- Lee Jung-hyun as Park Geum-cheol, a North Korean agent and Soo-ho's colleague, who committed suicide upon his arrest by Gang-mu. (Episode 1–2, 12)
- Song Geon-hee as Eun Yeong-u, Yeong-ro's brother, was forcibly sent into the military by his father after his involvement in the democratic protests was discovered. (Episode 2, 5, 6, 8)
- Chae Won-bin as Lim Soo-hui, Soo-ho's younger sister. (Episode 2, 10)
- Yum Jung-ah as Song Hye-joo, the former housemother of Hosu Women's University dormitory. She was believed to have committed suicide. (Episode 16)

== Episodes ==
No.	Title	Original release date
1	"Episode 1"	December 18, 2021
As university students, Eun Yeong-ro and Lim Soo-ho meet in a group blind date at a coffee shop, where Yeong-ro falls in love with him at first sight. Unknown to Yeong-ro and everyone else, Soo-ho is actually a North Korean spy tasked to bring a professor named Han I-seop over to the North. Six months later, as Soo-ho's plan is about to succeed, they are intercepted by a team of ANSP agents, led by Lee Gang-mu. Soo-ho gets shot as he tries to escape to the Hosu Women's University's dormitory.
2	"Episode 2"	December 19, 2021
Sustaining gunshot wounds from the ANSP's gunfire, Soo-ho enters the Hosu Women's University's dormitory through the window of Room 207 and collapses. Assuming Soo-ho was a student protester, Yeong-ro and her roommates attempt to hide him from the pursuing ANSP agents and police officers. They also seek the help of the facility manager, Kim Man-dong, who helps hide Soo-ho in the attic.
3	"Episode 3"	December 24, 2021
Yeong-ro takes care of the injured Soo-ho in the attic and tries to find a way to send him out of the dormitory without being noticed. With the University's annual open house coming up, Yeong-ro makes use of the event to escort Soo-ho out of the dorm by pretending that he is her male partner for the event. Before he leaves, Soo-ho gives Yeong-ro his sister's necklace as gratitude for helping him.
4	"Episode 4"	December 25, 2021
After leaving the dormitory, Soo-ho continues his mission. Meanwhile, in Yeong-ro's case, she is discovered by the dorm's phone operator, Gye Bun-ok, and the dorm's housemother, Pi Seung-hee, for harbouring a suspected spy. As a result, Yeong-ro is expelled for violating the dorm's regulations. The next day, ANSP agent, Lee Gang-mu, secures solid evidence of Soo-ho's whereabouts and pursues him. While on the run, Soo-ho accidentally enters the dorm through an abandoned hut with a secret passage. Facing gunpoint from the ANSP, Soo-ho is forced to reveal his identity as a spy and threatens Yeong-ro and the other female students at gunpoint.
5	"Episode 5"	December 26, 2021
Soo-ho, who has taken the students and staff of Hosu Women's University dormitory as hostage, negotiates with the head of ANSP to escape the dormitory with his teammates, Gyeok-chan and Eung-cheol. Gang-mu is also held hostage by the North Koreans at the dorm, where he is violently assaulted and tied up. The sudden turn of events traumatises Yeong-ro, who feels betrayed by Soo-ho's coldness and ruthlessness.
6	"Episode 6"	January 1, 2022
Turning a blind eye to Yeong-ro who feels betrayed, Soo-ho continues the hostage crisis. A doctor, Kang Cheong-ya, who is the mistress of the incumbent party member, Nam Tae-il, is sent in to treat Eung-cheol, who was injured in the earlier gunfight with the ANSP. As Yeong-ro confronts Soo-ho in order to get him to release the hostages, she reveals to Soo-ho in secret that her father is ANSP's current director, Eun Chang-su.
7	"Episode 7"	January 2, 2022
Knowing that Yeong-ro is the daughter of the head of ANSP, Soo-ho has no choice but to use her to make it out alive. However, despite everything, he cannot deny his guilt towards Yeong-ro and tries to make amends. Cheong-ya reveals herself to Soo-ho's team that she is actually a North Korean spy and has been sent to ensure their safe return before the North's scheduled deadline.
8	"Episode 8"	January 8, 2022
As the hostage situation continues, Yeong-ro's brother, Yeong-u, gets injured in a North Korean attack on sea, where he later passes away in a hospital. Upon hearing her brother's death from the news, which falsely implicates Soo-ho as the mastermind (under the political orders), Yeong-ro becomes hysterical and passes out. Soo-ho, who witnesses Yeong-ro's misery, becomes heartbroken and apologizes to her, and even goes to her room to give her back her brother's scarf. Meanwhile, tension continues to build up as the government seeks to make use of the hostage situation to remain in power through false news and fabricated information.
9	"Episode 9"	January 9, 2022
Despite Soo-ho's sincerity, Yeong-ro does not believe him and eventually works out an escape plan with Gang-mu, who earlier got wind of the government's scheme. Throughout the episode, Soo-ho continues to be soft-hearted towards Yeong-ro, which adds more conflict to their feelings towards one another. However, as the escape plan was about to succeed, Cheong-ya threatens to set off the bomb. Eventually, she detonates the bomb, destroying the dorm's windows.
10	"Episode 10"	January 15, 2022
When the anonymous reveals their identity, Jang Han-na carries out Gang-mu's secret order to obtain secret evidence surrounding the hostage crisis. As Soo-ho begins to doubt that he and the others can make it out alive, his relationship with Yeong-ro experiences more challenges and turns. It becomes apparent to all the spies and hostages that Soo-ho shows genuine concern and affection for Yeong-ro, who realizes his sincerity shortly after he saves her life from a gunshot by Gyeok-chan and the ANSP, which gradually erases her hatred towards him.
11	"Episode 11"	January 16, 2022
Finally facing the cruel truth surrounding the hostage crisis, Soo-ho joins hands with Gang-mu and suppresses Cheong-ya. He embarks on a path to regain the trust of the students and staff, who are also informed of the truth behind the hostage situation. As their relationship gradually improves, Soo-ho and Yeong-ro share their first kiss over a heart-to-heart conversation and a cup of coffee.
12	"Episode 12"	January 22, 2022
As the situation worsens, Soo-ho and Yeong-ro continue to depend on each other more. Soo-ho and Gang-mu attempt to expose the scheme behind the presidential election while also dealing with the presence of a spy, who leaked their plan to the ANSP. Both Gang-mu and Soo-ho see through Chang-su's plan to save only his daughter and not the others, which leads to Yeong-ro becoming more guilty towards her friends, who are still unaware of her identity. In hopes of changing his mind, Soo-ho and Gang-mu arrange a time and place for Yeong-ro and her father to meet. Yeong-ro confronts and stands up against her father. From a surprise situation, Yeong-ro rushes in front of Soo-ho at gunpoint without hesitation. Tae-il, having become frustrated with Chang-su's aversion to sacrificing his daughter, makes use of the situation to assassinate Chang-su.
13	"Episode 13"	January 23, 2022
Soo-ho comforts Yeong-ro, who no longer trusts her father. Meanwhile, students are confused as to which side they should trust. As the media frames the North Korean spies as the ones who shot Chang-su, Yeong-ro distresses and worries over her father's condition, which is faked as critical by the media sources. After an order is sent for the agents to blow themselves and the hostages up, Cheong-ya comes up with a plan to intercept the money sent by the South to the North to ensure the agents' survival. Reluctant, Soo-ho and Gang-mu eventually agree and allow her to secretly escape.
14	"Episode 14"	January 29, 2022
Soo-ho is heartbroken to see Yeong-ro struggling with guilt after hearing the news about her father being shot. While Cheong-ya is outside carrying out the plan, the alliance between Soo-ho and Gang-mu is momentarily shaken by mistrust due to their conflicting opinions over the validity of Cheong-ya's motives as well as Gang-mu's well-meaning intention to convince Soo-ho to defect to the South through arresting him. As Yeong-ro's romance with Soo-ho further develops, her friends discover she is the daughter of the ANSP director and sever ties with her, causing Yeong-ro to seek solace and cry in Soo-ho's arms.
15	"Episode 15"	January 30, 2022
Giving up his hope in Cheong-ya, Soo-ho has no choice but to accept the head of ANSP's proposal. Miraculously, Cheong-ya comes back with the money and states she has arranged a ship for the agents to illegally leave South Korea for another country. As Bun-ok continues to secretly reveal to Ahn Gyeong-hui from the ANSP about Gang-mu and Soo-ho's plans, she discovers the truth about her sister, Yeon-ok. Ms. Pi revealed to her that Yeon-ok was framed as a spy, which later led to her suicide, by none other than Gyeong-hui. Shocked, Bun-ok begins re-evaluating her allegiances. Soo-ho and Yeong-ro later share their goodbyes as Soo-ho gifts Yeong-ro his sister's necklace a second time.
16	"Episode 16"	January 30, 2022
Soo-ho, who leaves Yeong-ro, stands at the crossroads of fate just before returning to his hometown. During the agents' escape, Man-dong reveals himself as a secret spy and kills both Eung-cheol and Gyeok-chan. He tries to shoot Soo-ho, who convinces him from doing so. Man-dong ends up getting shot by his colleague after using his last moment to shield Soo-ho. After parting ways with Cheong-ya, Soo-ho returns to the dorm to assist Gang-mu and Han-na. Allowing the hostages to safely escape, Soo-ho chooses to stay behind to fight the SWAT team. He ultimately succumbs to his injuries after taking gunfire to protect Yeong-ro. In the aftermath, the truth comes to light and Chang-su, Tae-il, and Gyeong-hui are sent to prison. Yeong-ro, who is still grieving over Soo-ho's death, listens to his recorded tape with his last words, including the confession of his love for her. The series ends with an imaginary scene where Soo-ho plays the guitar and sings a song for Yeong-ro in the coffee shop where they both first met.

== Production ==
=== Development ===
Written by Yoo Hyun-mi and directed by Jo Hyun-tak, Snowdrop is their second collaboration after having worked together on the hit satirical thriller Sky Castle (2018–19). Based on the memoirs of a man who escaped a political prison camp in North Korea, Yoo Hyun-mi had been planning the series for twelve years. The early working title of the series was Ehwa Woman's University Dormitory (이대 기숙사; idae gisuksa).

=== Casting ===
On June 18, 2020, media reported that Kim Hye-yoon, who was propelled to fame after starring in Sky Castle, was in talks to star in the series; her agency confirmed that she was reviewing the offer. On August 18, reports of Jisoo being cast as one of the lead actresses for the series surfaced. It was confirmed later that day by Jisoo's agency, YG Entertainment. On August 24, Kim Hye-yoon was confirmed to co-star alongside Jisoo and it was reported that Jung Hae-in had received an offer but was still reviewing it. Jang Seung-jo officially joined the cast on August 26, followed by Jung Yoo-jin on September 17 and Yoon Se-ah on September 18. On October 5, 2020, the main cast and details on the characters were confirmed by JTBC. Yoo In-na officially joined the cast on December 28.

=== Filming ===
On November 24, 2020, JTBC announced that filming for Snowdrop was temporarily halted after a supporting actor came into close contact with someone who tested positive for COVID-19. The following day, JTBC confirmed that filming would resume after all cast and crew members tested negative for the virus. Filming was completed in late July 2021.

== Original soundtrack ==
Snowdrop (Original Television Soundtrack)

Soundtrack album by Various Artists
- Released: February 5, 2022
- Genre: Soundtrack
- Length: 2:06:00
- Languages: Korean; English
- Labels: Warner; JTBC Studio

Singles from Snowdrop
- 1. "If You're with Me" Released: December 18, 2021; 2. "Friend" Released: December 26, 2021; 3. "Looks Like a Real Thing" Released: January 8, 2022; 4. "Wishes" Released: January 15, 2022; 5. "Memories More than Love" Released: January 22, 2022

The following is the official track list of Snowdrop (Original Television Soundtrack) album. Singles included on the album were released from December 18, 2021, to January 22, 2022.

CD 1
No.	Title	Lyrics	Music	Artist	Length
1.	"Friend"	Cho Se-yeon; Kim Je-hwi	Kim Je-hwi; Kang Ji-won	Kim Hee-won	4:23
2.	"If You're with Me" (곁에 있어준다면)	IRIS Yerin Lee	Ahn Jae-hwan; IRIS Yerin Lee; Moode; ON	Sung Si-kyung	3:51
3.	"Looks Like a Real Thing"	Cho Se-yeon	Kim Je-hwi	JeHwi	3:02
4.	"Paper Airplane"			Ham Byeong-seon (9z)	2:57
5.	"Snowdrop"			Choi Jeong-in	2:00
6.	"Destiny"			Ong Sung-eun	2:28
7.	"The Eternal Moment"			Kim Yeon-jung	3:34
8.	"Attic"			Choi Jeong-in	1:46
9.	"The First Snow"			Ong Sung-eun	3:38
10.	"Underwork"			Lim Mi-hyun	2:14
11.	"Power Game"			Shin Hyun-pil	3:03
12.	"What Are You Hiding?"			Yoon Chae-young	1:31
13.	"Hosu Womans University"			Choi Jeong-in	2:42
14.	"Lovely"			Park Jeong-eun	4:24
15.	"Room 207"			Yoon Chae-young	2:12
16.	"Near Miss"			Park Jeong-eun	3:23
17.	"Go for it!"			Ong Sung-eun	1:52
18.	"Open House Party"			Yoon Chae-young	3:05
19.	"Password"			Park Jeong-eun	3:19
20.	"Operation"			Lim Mi-hyun	2:10
21.	"Hopeless"			Lim Mi-hyun	3:17
Total length:					60:51

CD 2
No.	Title	Lyrics	Music	Artist	Length
1.	"Wishes"	J.UNA	J.UNA	Jamie Miller	3:59
2.	"Looks Like a Real Thing" (English version)	Sam Kim	Kim Je-hwi	JeHwi	3:02
3.	"Memories More than Love" (기억이란 사랑보다)	Lee Young-hoon	Lee Young-hoon	Kevin Oh (Note: Original song by Lee Moon-sae, released in 2001.)	4:45
4.	"Melt Away"			Kim Yeon-jung	4:00
5.	"Blossom"			Ong Sung-eun	2:16
6.	"Syndicate"			Shin Hyun-pil	3:07
7.	"Kang Chung Ya"			Yoon Chae-young	3:37
8.	"Date"			Park Jeong-eun	2:11
9.	"Tunnel"			Choi Jeong-in	7:49
10.	"Tenacity"			Lim Mi-hyun	3:00
11.	"Twisted Patriotism"			Shin Hyun-pil	2:07
12.	"She"			Park Jeong-eun	4:20
13.	"Follow The Rules"			Yoon Chae-young	2:45
14.	"Recall"			Ong Sung-eun	3:09
15.	"Shooting"			Lim Mi-hyun	2:13
16.	"Protest"			Shin Hyun-pil	4:52
17.	"No Choice"			Yoon Chae-young	2:23
18.	"Target"			Park Jeong-eun	3:12
19.	"A Song For Lovers"			Kim Yeon-jung	2:56
Total length:					65:03

== Reception ==
=== Critical response ===
Pierce Conran of the South China Morning Post awarded the series a 1 out of 5 stars rating, describing it as a "clumsy political thriller" and a major disappointment. Conran criticized the "static" nature of the plot, noting that the narrative became trapped in a "repetitive cycle" once the hostage crisis began in the university dormitory. He took issue with the show's "jarring" tonal shifts and its "insensitive" handling of the 1987 pro-democracy movement, specifically pointing out that the attempt to humanize national security agents and North Korean spies felt "ill-judged" given the historical context. Furthermore, he stated that despite the casting of Jisoo and Jung Hae-in, their performances were stifled by a script that prioritized "melodramatic tropes" over meaningful character development.

Rhian Daly of NME rated the series 3 out of 5 stars, defining it as an "ambitious but flawed tale of star-crossed lovers." Although the review noted the drama's strong initial premise, it criticized the "convoluted storytelling" and a significant lack of narrative focus, stating that the series became "overly extended" and "tedious" as it progressed. Daly concluded that the plot struggled to sustain its "emotional stakes" through the 16-episode run, ultimately hampered by a repetitive central conflict.

=== Viewership ===
==== Television ====
Snowdrop : South Korea viewers per episode (thousands)

Season	Episode number																Average
Season	1	2	3	4	5	6	7	8	9	10	11	12	13	14	15	16	Average
1	711	992	N/A	N/A	691	470	800	600	759	660	724	703	664	665	693	846	713

Source: Audience measurement performed nationwide by Nielsen Korea. (Note: Due to multiple ratings not recorded, the listed average ratings are calculated based on recorded ratings included in the table hence does not represent the exact average ratings.)

Average TV viewership ratings
Ep.	Original broadcast date	Average audience share (Nielsen Korea)	
Ep.	Original broadcast date	Nationwide	Seoul
1	December 18, 2021	2.985% (10th)	3.235% (7th)
2	December 19, 2021	3.898% (5th)	3.687% (5th)
† 3	December 24, 2021	1.853% (26th)	N/A
† 4	December 25, 2021	1.689% (23rd)	N/A
† 5	December 26, 2021	2.751% (11th)	N/A
6	January 1, 2022	1.912% (17th)	N/A
7	January 2, 2022	3.252% (8th)	3.491% (6th)
8	January 8, 2022	2.584% (13th)	N/A
9	January 9, 2022	3.064% (8th)	3.362% (7th)
10	January 15, 2022	2.571% (11th)	2.489% (10th)
11	January 16, 2022	3.017% (6th)	3.127% (5th)
12	January 22, 2022	2.521% (13th)	2.805% (7th)
13	January 23, 2022	2.798% (10th)	2.851% (7th)
14	January 29, 2022	2.749% (10th)	3.180% (5th)
15	January 30, 2022	2.773% (8th)	2.734% (8th)
16	January 30, 2022	3.393% (6th)	3.438% (5th)
Average		2.738%	3.127%
In the table above, the blue numbers represent the lowest published ratings and the red numbers represent the highest published ratings.; This drama airs on a cable channel/pay TV which normally has a relatively smaller audience compared to free-to-air TV/public broadcasters (KBS, SBS, MBC and EBS).; N/A denotes ratings information that was not released.; † Episode 3-5 were aired from December 24 to 26, 2021, earlier than originally scheduled, with the stated intention of alleviating concerns voiced by viewers.

==== Streaming ====
The episodes of Snowdrop were released weekly on Disney+ in Asia-Pacific regions simultaneously with the television airings. On January 4, NME reported that Snowdrop was ranked first among the most-watched series on Disney+ in Singapore, South Korea, Hong Kong, and Taiwan. In Japan, the program was the third most-watched series on the streaming platform, behind Hawkeye and The Book of Boba Fett. The series later premiered on February 9, 2022, on Disney+ in the United States, Canada and Europe while in Latin America it was released on Star+ and on Hotstar in India. The series also premiered in the Philippines on November 17, 2022, when Disney+ launched in the country.

=== Accolades ===
Name of the award ceremony, year presented, category, nominee of the award, and the result of the nomination
Award ceremony	Year	Category	Nominee / Work	Result	Ref.
Acervo Awards	2022	Best Actress in a Series	Jisoo	Won	
DDU Awards	2022	Best New Actress	Jisoo	Won	
Seoul International Drama Awards	2022	Outstanding Korean Actress	Jisoo	Won	

== Controversy ==
=== Pre-release ===
Snowdrop became the subject of controversy due to accusations of historical negationism. In March 2021, parts of the synopsis and character profiles were leaked online which revealed that the male protagonist is actually a North Korean spy posing as a pro-democracy student activist who infiltrates South Korea to instigate chaos and political instability. The premise drew backlash from South Korean netizens due to the drama being purportedly set against the backdrop of the 1987 June Struggle peaceful mass protest movement that had led to the establishment of democracy in South Korea. Netizens pointed out that the revelation of the male protagonist as a North Korean spy invokes false claims made by the authoritarian Chun Doo-hwan administration against pro-democracy activists that framed them as North Korean spies. Netizens also criticized the character Lee Kang-moo, a fictional agent of the real-life Agency for National Security Planning (ANSP) which served as the intelligence agency of the Chun dictatorship, being purportedly portrayed as just and righteous despite numerous human rights abuses committed by the ANSP.

On March 26, JTBC released their first official statement on the controversy that read, "The drama is not distorting the pro-democracy movement nor is it glorifying the Agency for National Security Planning. It is a black comedy drama satirizing the political situation between the two Koreas under the authoritarian government in the 1980s. Also, it is a romance drama showing young people who sacrifice their love." On March 30, JTBC released a second statement regarding the controversy that read, "Snowdrop is set around the 1987 presidential election, and not a drama that deals with the pro-democracy movement". The statement continued, "The drama portrays a fictional story about the military regime, the ANSP, and others in power at the time colluding with the North Korean dictatorship and planning a conspiracy to retain their power." Regarding the character Lee Kang-moo, who is an agent of the ANSP, the statement read, "The character is portrayed as a man of principle who turns his back on the corrupt organization and does what he thinks is right." The name of the female protagonist at the time, Eun Young-cho, had drawn scrutiny, as the given name "Young-cho" bore similarity to the name of real-life pro-democracy activist Chun Young-cho. The statement denied that the name of the female protagonist character was in reference to Chun Young-cho, but confirmed that the character's name would be changed.

On March 30, protesters parked a truck bearing protest signs at the site of the JTBC building in Seoul.

In the period from March 26 to April 25, a total of 226,078 people signed an online petition to the Blue House demanding that production on Snowdrop be stopped. The petition was started shortly after the cancellation of the SBS drama Joseon Exorcist due to accusations of historical negationism. On May 14, the Blue House issued an official response to the petition, rejecting the calls for the show's cancellation. The response stated that the Blue House did not intend to interfere in the production of Snowdrop, citing the protection of freedom of expression in South Korea's Broadcasting Law, which guarantees broadcasters' independence and prohibits extrajudicial regulation or interference. They recognized JTBC's previous statements about the drama plot. The response stated, however, that the Blue House was continuing to monitor the controversy, stating that "programming that violates broadcasting responsibilities, such as through excessive historical negationism or violation of regulations, are liable for a review by the Korea Communications Standards Commission," and that the Korea Communications Standards Commission would watch over the broadcasts.

=== Post-release ===
On December 18, 2021, the first episode of Snowdrop aired. On December 19, a new online petition to the Blue House was filed demanding that the airing of the drama be suspended. In a few hours over 80,000 people had signed the petition, and over 200,000 people had signed the petition by the end of the day. The petition reached 300,000 signatures by December 21. By December 22, there were at least 30 active petitions to the Blue House demanding the cancellation of the drama's broadcast. On December 24, a separate online petition to the Blue House was filed demanding the shutdown of JTBC for its "unconstitutional drama", which reached 30,000 signatures on its first day.

By December 21, around 3,000 requests to cancel Snowdrop were posted to JTBC's website and around 740 complaints were made to the Korea Communications Standards Commission regarding the drama. On December 21, an official citizen complaint was filed with South Korea's Anti-Corruption and Civil Rights Commission against Snowdrop's screenwriter Yoo Hyun-mi and director Jo Hyun-tak for violating the National Security Act. The World Citizen Declaration, a youth civic nonprofit that supports citizens resisting government violence, filed an injunction in the Seoul Western District Court to halt the broadcast of Snowdrop on December 22. That same day, Head of JTBC Studios Jung Kyeong-moon held a meeting with The World Citizen Declaration in which JTBC Studios reiterated that it did not intend to distort history. The Seoul Western District Court dismissed The World Citizen Declaration's lawsuit on December 29, finding in its decision that even if there was distortion of history in the plot, there was insufficient evidence to show the infringement of the group's civil rights or that the drama's audience may blindly accept the historical content as genuine.

Advertisers such as TEAZEN, Ssarijai, Heung Il Furniture, Ganisong, P&J Group, and Han's Electronics announced they were pulling advertisements from the broadcast of the show and issued apologies. Daegu University, where Snowdrop was filmed, stated that it requested the name of the university be taken off of the drama's credits.

Memorial institutions of student activists Bak Jong-cheol and Lee Han-yeol, whose deaths became key inciting events of the 1987 June Struggle, have criticized Snowdrop. The Bak Jong-cheol Memorial Foundation spoke out against the drama, calling it a "disparagement of the democratization movement" and "a drama with an obvious intention to distort." The Lee Han-yeol Memorial Museum also called on the drama to be cancelled. JTBC Studios attempted to arrange a meeting with a representative of the Bak Jong-cheol Memorial Foundation, but its efforts were unsuccessful.

On December 21, JTBC released their official statement on the controversy that read, "The background and motif for important incidents in Snowdrop are the time of military regime. With this background, it contains a fictional story of the party in power colluding with the North Korean government in order to maintain authority. Snowdrop is a creative work that shows the personal stories of individuals who were used and victimized by those in power. There is no spy who leads the democratization movement in Snowdrop. The male and female leads were not shown as participating in or leading the democratization movement in episodes 1 and 2, and they do not do so in any part of the future script." The statement continued, "Most of the misunderstandings regarding concerns of historical negationism and disparaging the democratization movement will be settled through the progress of the drama's plot. The drama includes the production team's intent of hoping for no repetition of an abnormal era in which individual freedom and happiness are oppressed by unjust power. Although we unfortunately cannot reveal much of the plot ahead of each episode, we ask that you watch over the future progress of the plot." JTBC stated their intention to listen to their official website's real-time chat and viewer message board.

JTBC hastened the broadcasting schedule of Snowdrop and aired episodes 3, 4, and 5 on December 24, 25 and 26 respectively, with the stated intention to quickly resolve misunderstandings from the beginning of the drama. JTBC stated that episodes 3–5 were released quickly because they explained the backstory of the character Soo-ho and revealed collusion between the ANSP and the North Korean government in the drama's story.

On December 23, Sim Sang-jung, 2022 presidential candidate of the Justice Party spoke out against the drama, stating, "If we are going to shine a light in a harsh era, the protagonist should be our ordinary citizens who shed blood, sweat and tears for the democracy of the Republic of Korea, not the security guards and spies of the South faction under the dictatorship." She also said that "creative freedom should be humble when faced with of the scars of history."

Defenders of Snowdrop have pointed to respect that must be given to freedom of expression. On his Facebook page, film director Jeong Yoon-cheol expressed his belief that censoring the drama's broadcast would be dictatorial in and of itself, and cited the films Hiroshima mon amour and The Lives of Others as positive examples of similar love stories that include individuals of objectionable political backgrounds. Political commentator Chin Jung-kwon called on the public to "just watch the drama as a drama."

On December 30, JTBC issued a last statement regarding the controversy around Snowdrop. The broadcasting station stated that JTBC is experiencing severe damages due to the spread of false and malicious comments regarding Snowdrop. JTBC considers the freedom and independence of creativity a key component of successful content creation, as much as they respect the rights of consumers to freely criticize or form opinions about content to a healthy extent. However, "against comments and rumors which openly terrorize those involved in the making of the drama and which have nothing to do with the story's actual content", JTBC plans to proceed with strict legal actions in order to protect the broadcasting station's image as well as the image of the drama's creators and the rights of creative content. JTBC then continued, "the synopsis of Snowdrop was leaked in the early stages of production, malicious narratives that falsified the plot were circulated continuously and repeatedly. Even to this day the spreading of false information and baseless accusations regarding the drama's content are swaying the public's opinions severely."

On March 30, 2022, Korea Communication Standards Commission investigation results revealed, from the first episode to the final episode, Snowdrop did not "distort history" or denigrate "democratization movement." Korea Communications Standards Commission has concluded that the drama was uncontroversial to the extent that it was not even a matter to be discussed in the Broadcasting Subcommittee.

On April 7, JTBC said in a phone call with the newspaper company, Money Today News, they had filed the criminal complaint against netizens for defamation. The first netizen Mr. A said, "I was sued by JTBC and Drama House through the above post." JTBC official explained, "Due to the negative public opinions there was a lot of damage done to the production company, team, and actors. We sued them for continuously stating false info different from the actual drama." When asked how many people were sued, they answered, "It's hard to say since it's an ongoing issue."
