= My Youth =

2025 South Korean television series

- Promotional poster
- Hangul: 마이 유스
- RR: Mai yuseu
- MR: Mai yusŭ
- Genre: Coming-of-age; Romance
- Written by: Park Si-hyeon
- Directed by: Lee Sang-yeop; Go Hye-jin
- Starring: Song Joong-ki; Chun Woo-hee; Lee Joo-myung; Seo Ji-hoon
- Music by: Studio Curiosity
- Opening theme: "Title of My Youth" by Park Sung-il
- Country of origin: South Korea
- Original language: Korean
- No. of episodes: 12

Production
- Running time: 70 minutes
- Production companies: SLL; HighZium Studio

Original release
- Network: JTBC
- Release: September 5 – October 17, 2025

My Youth (Korean: 마이 유스) is a 2025 South Korean television series starring Song Joong-ki, Chun Woo-hee, Lee Joo-myung and Seo Ji-hoon. It aired on JTBC from September 5 to October 17, 2025, every Friday at 20:50 (KST). The series also streams on Viki and Viu in selected regions.

== Synopsis ==
The drama focuses on Sunwoo Hae, who, after a difficult childhood in the entertainment industry, finds peace as a novelist and florist. He reconnects with his first love, Sung Je-yeon, who is now a driven team leader at a company. Their reunion forces them to confront their past and their present selves, as they navigate their own personal and professional struggles.

== Cast and characters ==
=== Main ===
- Song Joong-ki as Sunwoo Hae
  - Nam Da-reum as teen Sunwoo Hae
  - Choi Eun-jun as child Sunwoo Hae

A former child actor turned novelist and florist, seeking solace in art and love.

- Chun Woo-hee as Sung Je-yeon
  - Jeon So-young as teen Je-yeon
  - Kim Ji-yul as child Je-yeon

An actor manager and management team leader who was once a model student.

- Lee Ju-myoung as Mo Tae-rin
  - Jung Ye-na as teen Tae-rin

A model child star turned leading actress.

- Seo Ji-hoon as Kim Seok-ju
  - Cho Han-gyeol as teen Seok-ju

A tax accountant and Tae-rin's first love.

=== Supporting ===
- Jin Kyung as Kim Pil-doo

CEO of the entertainment agency and Seok-ju's mother.

- Jo Han-chul as Sunwoo Chan

A poet and publisher, and Hae's father.

- Choi Jeong-woon as Eun Nu-ri
  - Lee Chae-Yoo as young Nu-ri

A high school student and Hae's younger half-sister.

- Yoon Byung-hee as Lee Geon-noh

A longtime neighbor who grew up like family with Hae.

- Lee Bong-ryun as Bang Han-na

Director at the entertainment agency who yearns to break away from Pil-doo.

- Kwon Seung-woo as Choi Ki-beum
- Lee Jin-hee as Yang Ja-kyung
- Lee Ji-hye as Jin So-ra

A principled broadcasting PD (producer-director).

- Park Jae-hyun as Choi Sa-rang

A high school student and Ki-beum's younger brother.

- Kim Soo-jin as Je-yeon's mother
- Bae Yoon-gyu as Min-kyu

== Production ==
My Youth is directed by Lee Sang-yeop, whose works include Familiar Wife (2018), A Piece of Your Mind (2020) and Yumi's Cells (2021–22). The series is written by Park Si-hyeon, who wrote Run On (2020). It is co-produced by SLL and High-Zium Studio.

== Viewership ==
My Youth : South Korea viewers per episode (thousands)

Season	Episode number												Average
Season	1	2	3	4	5	6	7	8	9	10	11	12	Average
1	714	673	511	573	427	540	348	419	427	479	465	448	665

Source: Audience measurement performed nationwide by Nielsen Korea.

Average TV viewership ratings
Ep.	Original broadcast date	Average audience share	
Ep.	Original broadcast date	(Nielsen Korea)	
Ep.	Original broadcast date	Nationwide	Seoul
1	September 5, 2025	2.915% (3rd)	2.959% (2nd)
2	September 5, 2025	2.822% (5th)	3.058% (1st)
3	September 12, 2025	2.155% (7th)	2.033% (7th)
4	September 12, 2025	2.430% (6th)	2.277% (4th)
5	September 19, 2025	1.930% (7th)	1.968% (5th)
6	September 19, 2025	2.249% (5th)	2.268% (3rd)
7	September 26, 2025	1.539% (10th)	1.355% (8th)
8	September 26, 2025	2.090% (5th)	1.884% (4th)
9	October 3, 2025	1.710% (9th)	1.472% (9th)
10	October 3, 2025	1.972% (7th)	2.011% (5th)
11	October 10, 2025	1.852% (6th)	1.738% (5th)
12	October 17, 2025	2.107% (8th)	1.986% (6th)
Average		2.148%	2.084%
In the table above, the blue numbers represent the lowest ratings and the red numbers represent the highest ratings.; This drama aired on a cable channel/pay TV which normally has a relatively smaller audience compared to free-to-air TV/public broadcasters (KBS, SBS, MBC, and EBS).
