= TVING =

South Korean online streaming platform

- Screenshot of TVING homepage on July 7, 2021
- Native name: 주식회사 티빙
- Website type: OTT platform
- Founded: May 31, 2010; 16 years ago
- Area served: South Korea
- Owners: CJ ENM (48.85%); KT Studio Genie (13.54%); JC & Partners (13.54%); SLL (12.75%); Naver Corporation (10.66%); Others (0.66%)
- Key people: Choi Ju-hee (CEO)
- Website: www.tving.com (in Korean)
- Users: 4.2 million (As of 2024)

TVING (Korean: 티빙) is a South Korean exclusive subscription video on-demand, over-the-top, streaming television service operated by TVING Corporation, a joint venture comprising CJ ENM (CJ Group), Naver and JTBC by its JTBC Studios, now called SLL. TVING distributes television series, specials, variety shows, films, documentaries, animations, and sports.

== History ==
TVING was launched on May 31, 2010, by CJ HelloVision. In January 2016, the service was transferred to CJ E&M. On September 17, 2019, CJ E&M and JTBC Studios, now SLL signed an MOU to establish a new joint venture company to operate the service. On October 1, 2020, the joint venture company was launched as TVING Corporation and Yang Ji-eul became the first CEO of the entity. On April 29, 2021, TVING announced that it would no longer provide real-time TV channels for free with paid subscription needed in order to view the content moving forward. On June 30, 2021, it was announced that Naver has invested ₩40 billion into TVING Corporation, making Naver the second largest shareholder group at 15% after CJ E&M.

During the TVING Connect online event, TVING announced plans to launch the service in Japan and Taiwan by 2022. TVING is also in talks with Naver subsidiary Line Corporation for launching the platform in other Asian countries, along with the United States and Europe. As of August 2025, they haven't rolled out their global expansions as they planned.

In December 2021, TVING announced a paternship featuring CJ content with Paramount Global (formerly ViacomCBS) and launch Paramount+ as a content hub on TVING, which was set to be launched on June 16, 2022. It also announced that it would release K-dramas co-produced by both CJ (including Studio Dragon and newly formed CJ ENM Studios) and Paramount. The partnership was eventually ended as Paramount Global having their financial struggle.

In July 2022, CJ ENM and telecom giant KT announced that KT-owned streaming platform Seezn will be merging with TVING. It was also confirmed that once the merger is finalized, TVING will become South Korea's largest streaming platform and will be competing against Netflix, which has dominated the Korean streaming markets. The merger was approved by the Korean Fair Trade Commission in October 2022. They also planned to merged with one of their local competitor, SK Telecom's Wavve, to gap against Netflix.

On June 29, 2023, Choi Ju-hee was appointed as the new CEO of TVING.

In March 2024, TVING signed a '2024–2026 KBO League Wired and Wireless Broadcasting Rights Business Contract' with the Korea Baseball Organization (KBO), acquiring the right to broadcast all KBO League games live in the new media sector. In addition, CJ ENM was selected as the official broadcaster for professional basketball for four seasons starting from the 2024–2025 season and provided streaming services through TVING. In December 2024, TVING cooperated with Apple TV+ to launch the 'Apple TV+ Brand Zone' that allows users to enjoy contents of 'Apple TV+' through the TVING app.

In 2025, TVING formed a global partenership with Disney+ and launched the first bundle product in Korea that allows users to access TVING, Wavve, and Disney+ together.

In 2026, TVING suffered a major data breach in which about 39.54 million account records, including names, phone numbers and email addresses, were compromised, according to a South Korean government investigation.

== Logo ==
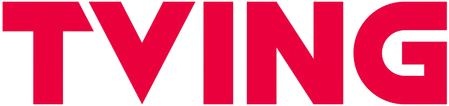
2016–2020

2020–2022

2022–present

== Availability ==
Availability timeline
Release date	Country/Territory	Release partner(s)	Ref.
October 1, 2020	South Korea	—N/a	
November 5, 2025	Japan	Disney+	
January 2, 2026	Hong Kong	HBO Max	
January 2, 2026	Indonesia	HBO Max	
January 2, 2026	Malaysia	HBO Max	
January 2, 2026	Philippines	HBO Max	
January 2, 2026	Singapore	HBO Max	
January 2, 2026	Taiwan	HBO Max	
January 2, 2026	Thailand	HBO Max	

== See also ==
- List of streaming media services
