= Kim Seong-yoon (director) =

South Korean television director (born 1976)

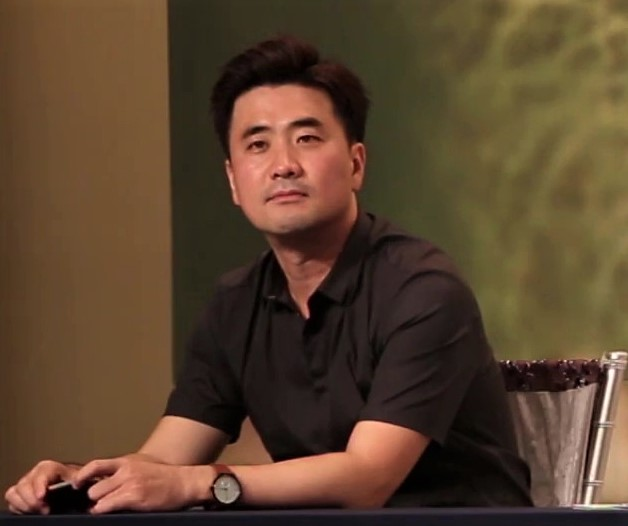
- Kim in 2016
- Born: 1976 (age 49–50)
- Occupation: Television director
- Employer(s): KBS (2010–2017); JTBC (2017–present)

Korean name
- Hangul: 김성윤
- Hanja: 金盛閏
- RR: Gim Seongyun
- MR: Kim Sŏngyun

Kim Seong-yoon (born 1976) is a South Korean television director, best known for directing popular television series Love in the Moonlight (2016) and Itaewon Class (2020).

== Career ==
In 2001, Kim joined the Entertainment Department of KBS and later moved to the Drama Department. He co-directed television dramas The Great Merchant (2010) Dream High (2011), Big (2012) and Discovery of Love (2014).

In 2015, Kim co-directed Who Are You: School 2015 – the sixth installment of KBS's School series with Baek Sang-hoon. The drama, written by Kim Min-jeong and Im Ye-jin, received modest viewership ratings but was well received by young viewers and became popular overseas, leading to increased recognition for its cast – Kim So-hyun, Nam Joo-hyuk, and Yook Sung-jae.

In 2016, he directed the youth historical drama Love in the Moonlight, which marked the second collaboration of him with writers Kim Min-jeong and Im Ye-jin after School 2015. Based on the novel Moonlight Drawn by Clouds, series depicts the growth of Lee Yeong, Crown Prince of Joseon, (played by Park Bo-gum) and his unlikely relationship with eunuch Hong Ra-on (a woman disguised as a man, portrayed by Kim You-jung). The series met with praise by critics and audiences for its production, performances and music, achieved peak audience rating of 23.3% and dominated topicality, content and brand reputation charts. The media to called its popularity "Moonlight Syndrome". Following the huge popularity gained from the drama, lead actor Park became the first ever actor to top the Forbes Korea Power Celebrity list and lead actress Kim became the youngest to be included in the Top 10 of the same list.

In March 2017, he resigned from KBS and joined JTBC. Three years later in 2020, Kim directed JTBC-broadcast and Netflix-distributed drama series Itaewon Class starring Park Seo-joon and Kim Da-mi, based on the webtoon of the same name. The drama was a success, and was praised for its interesting story development and colorful performances. Its final episode recorded a 16.548% nationwide audience share, making it the third-highest viewership rating in JTBC and the eighth highest rated drama in Korean cable television history. Time Magazine and Forbes included Itaewon Class on their lists of "The 10 Best Korean Dramas to Watch on Netflix" and "The 13 Best Korean Dramas Of 2020" respectively.

He again reunited with writer Kim Min-jeong (for their third collaboration) in the fantasy musical drama The Sound of Magic, based on webtoon Annarasumanara. The series starring Ji Chang-wook, Choi Sung-eun and Hwang In-youp was released in May 2022 on Netflix. Later that year he reunited with the cast members of Love in the Moonlight, Itaewon Class and The Sound of Magic in the TVING travel entertainment program Young Actors' Retreat.

== Filmography ==
=== Television series ===
Year	Title	Network	Notes	Ref.
2010	The Great Merchant	KBS1	Co-directed with Kang Byung-taek	
2011	Dream High	KBS2	Co-directed with Lee Eung-bok	
2011	Drama Special Human Casino	KBS2	One-act play	
2011	Drama Special Sorry I'm Late	KBS2	One-act play	
2012	Big	KBS2	Co-directed with Ji Byung-hyun	
2013	Puberty Medley	KBS2		
2013	Drama Special My Dad Is a Nude Model	KBS2	One-act play	
2014	Drama Special The Reason I'm Getting Married	KBS2	One-act play	
2014	Discovery of Love	KBS2	Co-directed with Lee Eung-bok	
2015	Who Are You: School 2015	KBS2	Co-directed with Baek Sang-hoon	
2016	Love in the Moonlight	KBS2	Co-directed with Baek Sang-hoon	
2020	Itaewon Class	JTBC		
2022	The Sound of Magic	Netflix		
2025	Pro Bono	tvN		

=== Television show ===
Year	Title	Network	Notes	Ref.
2022	Young Actors' Retreat	TVING	As a planner	

== Awards and nominations ==
Year	Award ceremony	Category	Nominee / Work	Result	Ref.
2017	29th Korea PD Awards	Best Picture - TV Drama	Love in the Moonlight	Nominated	
2017	53rd Baeksang Arts Awards	Best Drama	Love in the Moonlight	Nominated	
2017	12th Seoul International Drama Awards	Top Excellence Award for Korean Wave Drama	Love in the Moonlight	Won	
2017	10th Korea Drama Awards	Best Drama	Love in the Moonlight	Nominated	
2017	10th Korea Drama Awards	Best Production Director	Love in the Moonlight	Nominated	
2020	56th Baeksang Arts Awards	Best Director	Itaewon Class	Nominated	
