= Young Actors' Retreat =

2022 South Korean television show

- Promotional poster
- Hangul: 청춘MT
- Lit.: Youth MT (Note: Term MT stands for Membership Training.)
- RR: Cheongchun MT
- MR: Ch'ŏngch'un MT
- Genre: Reality; Travel
- Created by: Kim Seong-yoon (planning)
- Written by: Ji Hyun-sook
- Directed by: Jeong Jong-chan
- Starring: See full list below
- Music by: Park Seong-il
- Country of origin: South Korea
- Original language: Korean
- No. of episodes: 8

Production
- Producers: Kim Soo-ah; Park Woo-ram; Park Seong-hye
- Running time: 54–68 minutes
- Production companies: KeyEast Studio Flow; Shijak Company

Original release
- Network: TVING
- Release: September 9 – October 21, 2022

Young Actors' Retreat (Korean: 청춘MT) is a South Korean entertainment program planned by Kim Seong-yoon, featuring cast members of television series directed by Kim: Love in the Moonlight (2016), Itaewon Class (2020), and The Sound of Magic (2022). It premiered on TVING on September 9, 2022.

== Overview ==
Cast members from different drama teams are mixed together, play membership training (MT) games, and travel together

== Cast ==
Love in the Moonlight Team	Itaewon Class Team	The Sound of Magic Team
Park Bo-gum; Kim Yoo-jung; Jung Jin-young; Kwak Dong-yeon; Chae Soo-bin	Park Seo-joon; Ahn Bo-hyun; Kwon Nara; Ryu Kyung-soo; Lee Joo-young	Ji Chang-wook; Choi Sung-eun; Hwang In-youp; Ji Hye-won; Kim Bo-yoon

== Episodes ==
Ep.	Original release date	Title	Location(s)	Guest(s)	Running time	Ref.
1	September 9, 2022	"We met again" (다시 만난 우리)	Jeonju, North Jeolla Province; Itaewon, Seoul		68 minutes	
Team leaders of each drama team; Kim Yoo-jung, Park Seo-joon and Ji Chang-wook are tasked with finding their team members who are hiding in different places related to the filming locations of their own dramas. (Note: Ahn Bo-hyun is absent in the first three episodes.)
2	September 9, 2022	"It's the first time, but it's fun" (초면이지만, 즐겁습니다)	Boryeong, South Chungcheong Province	Yoon Kyung-ho	63 minutes	
Three drama teams arrive at the base camp in Boryeong. Then the members are mixed up and the teams are rearranged as Team Red (Note: consisted of team members Kim Yoo-jung, Park Bo-gum, Hwang In-youp, Choi Sung-eun, and Lee Joo-young.) (led by Kim Yoo-jung), Team Yellow (Note: consisted of team members Park Seo-joon, Yoon Kyung-ho, Kwak Dong-yeon, Chae Soo-bin and Ji Hye-won.) (led by Park Seo-joon) and Team Blue (Note: consisted of team members Ji Chang-wook, Kwon Na-ra, Jung Jin-young, Ryu Kyung-soo and Kim Bo-yoon.) (led by Ji Chang-wook) and they play games to win their dinner.
3	September 16, 2022	"A dramatic summer night" (극적인 여름밤)	Boryeong, South Chungcheong Province	Yoon Kyung-ho	65 minutes	
Based on the results of previous games, each team gets to enjoy different meals for dinner. Afterwards they participate in horror training at an abandoned school in which the losing team will face a penalty.
4	September 23, 2022	"Shall we talk casually now?" (우리 서로 말 놓을까?)	Boryeong, South Chungcheong Province		56 minutes	
After the breakfast prepared by the team who placed last in the previous day's horror training, cast members split themselves in to two groups at their choice, to enjoy either Hanok experience or outdoor activities. Team Outdoor (Note: consisted of members Park Seo-joon, Park Bo-gum, Kim Yoo-jung, Hwang In-youp, Ahn Bo-hyun, Kwnon Nara, Lee Joo-young and Kim Bo-yoon.) goes on a thrilling zipline while Team Hanok (Note: consisted of members Ji Chang-wook, Choi Sung-eun, Jung Jin-young, Kwak Dong-yeon, Chae Soo-bin, Ryu Kyung, and Ji Hye-won.) spends their time at the base camp itself.
5	September 30, 2022	"Hold your breath and dive in to youth" (숨 참고 청춘 Dive)	Boryeong, South Chungcheong Province	Kim Hye-eun	54 minutes	
After zipline tour, Team Outdoor enjoys lunch and then takes pictures at a photo booth. Team Hanok plays board games and those who lost prepare lunch. Then again all the members gather at Daecheon Beach where three drama teams participate in a flying chair tournament.
6	October 7, 2022	"The story of the rain and you" (비와 당신의 이야기)	Boryeong, South Chungcheong Province	Kim Hye-eun	57 minutes	
Flying chair tournament ends and the losing team prepares breakfast the next day. Then, the three drama teams play 'scream in silence' game to win money for ingredients for their tent bars.
7	October 14, 2022	"Young actors' bar" (청춘포차)	Boryeong, South Chungcheong Province	Kim Hye-eun	60 minutes	
Based on the results of the previous game, each drama team gets different budgets for their tent bars. They go shopping to buy ingredients and make preparations to open their food trucks.
8	October 21, 2022	"Youth and its last night" (청춘MT 마지막 이야기)	Boryeong, South Chungcheong Province	Kim Hye-eun, Lee Jun-hyeok, Yoo Jae-myung, Jo Han-chul	66 minutes	

== Production ==
In May 2022, Kim Seong-yoon was reported to be planning a new travel entertainment program with the actors who appeared in the works he directed and several actors were reportedly considering the offer. On June 30, casting of the 15 actors was confirmed by TVING.

== Release ==
Episodes 1 and 2 was released on TVING at 16:00 (KST) on September 9, 2022, and a total of eight episodes will be released every Friday for seven weeks.

== Soundtrack ==
Tracklist

Young Actors' Retreat

Soundtrack album by: Jong-ho; Park Seong-il
- Released: September 16, 2022
- Genres: Rock; metal
- Language: Korean
- Label: Vlending

No.	Title	Lyrics	Music	Artist	Length
1.	"A Fairy Tale of Youth" (청춘동화)	Cho Dong-hee	Park Seong-il	Jongho (ATEEZ)	3:49
2.	"Theme of Young Actors' Retreat" (Heart Fluttering Ver.)		Park Seong-il		2:34
3.	"Theme of Young Actors' Retreat" (Innocent Ver.)		Park Seong-il		2:06
4.	"Theme of Young Actors' Retreat" (Light Ver.)		Park Seong-il		1:58
5.	"A Fairy Tale of Youth" (청춘동화; Inst.)		Park Seong-il		3:49
Total length:					14:16
