= My Name Is Loh Kiwan =

2024 film by Kim Hee-jin

My Name is Loh Kiwan
- Promotional poster
- Hangul: 로기완
- RR: Ro Giwan
- MR: Ro Kiwan
- Directed by: Kim Hee-jin
- Screenplay by: Kim Hee-jin
- Based on: I Met Loh Ki-wan by Cho Hae-jin
- Produced by: Jang Eun-young
- Starring: Song Joong-ki; Choi Sung-eun
- Cinematography: Lim Won-geun
- Edited by: Yang Jin-mo
- Music by: Dalpalan
- Production companies: Yong Film; HighZium Studio
- Distributed by: Netflix
- Release date: March 1, 2024 (South Korea)
- Running time: 133 minutes
- Country: South Korea
- Languages: Korean; French; English; Chinese

My Name Is Loh Kiwan (Korean: 로기완) is a 2024 South Korean drama film written and directed by Kim Hee-jin and starring Song Joong-ki and Choi Sung-eun. It is based on the 2019 fictional novel I Met Loh Kiwan by author Cho Hae-jin. The film is about the experiences of a North Korean defector who travels to Belgium for refuge. It was released on Netflix in selected regions on March 1, 2024.

== Synopsis ==
Loh Kiwan, a North Korean defector escapes to China with his mother only to be separated from her by the harsh Chinese authorities. Forced to flee again, Kiwan finds himself in Brussels, a completely foreign land with a biting winter. There, he faces homelessness and the struggle to survive. But Kiwan is driven by his mother's dying wish to find a safe haven where he can live freely. A glimmer of hope appears when he meets Marie, former Belgian athlete who has also fallen on hard times. Together, they confront their individual hardships and forge a bond as they fight for a better future.

== Cast ==
- Song Joong-ki as Loh Kiwan, a North Korean defector
- Choi Sung-eun as Marie Lee, a former shooting athlete
- Kim Sung-ryung as Ok-hee, Kiwan's mother
- Seo Hyun-woo as Ri Eun-cheol, Loh Kiwan's maternal uncle
- Lee Sang-hee as Seon-ju, a Korean-Chinese immigrant whom Ki-wan meets at a Belgian factory
- Jo Han-chul as Lee Youn-sung, Marie's father
- Lee Il-hwa as Jeong-ju, Marie's mother
- Waël Sersoub as Cyril, a bar owner in Belgium

== Production ==
The film is based on a fictional 2019 novel by South Korean author Cho Hae-jin. An article published by Liberty in North Korea, a non-profit that assists North Korean defectors, evaluated the circumstances and themes in the story as realistic. Defectors often deal with imperiled escapes, difficult asylum applications, trauma, and cultural and linguistic barriers.

On February 8, 2023, Netflix confirmed production of the film with the casting of Song Joong-ki, Choi Sung-eun, Jo Han-chul, Kim Sung-ryung, Lee Il-hwa, Lee Sang-hee, and Seo Hyun-woo.

On February 24, 2023, Song Joong-ki posted a photo that showed the start of filming in Hungary.

== Release ==
The film was released exclusively on Netflix on March 1, 2024.

== Accolades ==
Name of the award ceremony, year presented, category, nominee of the award, and the result of the nomination
Award	Year	Category	Nominee / work	Result	Ref.
Baeksang Arts Awards	2024	Best Supporting Actress	Lee Sang-hee	Won	
