= Bae Hyun-sung =

South Korean actor (born 1999)

- Bae in 2026
- Born: Bae Hyun-sung; 3 May 1999 (age 27); Jeonju, South Korea
- Occupations: Actor; model
- Years active: 2018–present
- Agent: Awesome ENT

Korean name
- Hangul: 배현성
- RR: Bae Hyeonseong
- MR: Pae Hyŏnsŏng

Bae Hyun-sung (Korean: 배현성; born 3 May 1999) is a South Korean actor. He is best known for his roles in the Korean series Our Blues (2022), Gaus Electronics (2022), Gyeongseong Creature (2024), and Family by Choice (2024).

== Career ==
=== 2018–present: Acting debut ===
Bae started his career as an actor and made his debut in the web series Love Playlist. He made several cameos in films such as The Divine Fury (2019), The Most Ordinary Romance (2019), and on television series like What's Wrong with Secretary Kim (2018).

He was starred in the fourth season of Love Playlist, reprising his role as Park Ha-neul and partners Kim Sae-ron. He was also part of the school fantasy drama Extraordinary You (2019) and of the critically acclaimed tv series Hospital Playlist. One of the most important role he played was in the drama Our Blues acclaimed positively by the audience.

He landed one of the main roles in the drama Family by Choice, Korean remake of the Chinese drama Go Ahead in 2023. Drama was aired in last quarter of 2024 at JTBC channel and OTT platforms.

In 2025, Bae made a special appearance in drama Resident Playbook, reprising his role from Hospital Playlist. Also, in the same year, it was confirmed he was cast in new Han Suk-kyu's drama Shin's Project.

== Filmography ==
=== Film ===
Key
†	Denotes films that have not yet been released

Year	Title	Role	Notes	Ref.
2019	The Divine Fury	Hyun-sung		
2019	The Most Ordinary Romance	Employee		
2026	Paradise Lost	Ryu Sun-Woo		

=== Television series ===
Key
†	Denotes television productions that have not yet been released

Year	Title	Role	Notes	Ref.
2018	What's Wrong with Secretary Kim	Intern Staff (Bae Hyun-sung)		
2019	Extraordinary You	Baek Joon-hyun		
2020–2021	Hospital Playlist	Jang Hong-do	Season 1–2	
2022	Our Blues	Jung-hyun		
2022	Dear.M	Park Ha-neul		
2022	Gaus Electronics	Baek Ma-tan		
2023	Miraculous Brothers	Kang San		
2024	Gyeongseong Creature	Seung-jo	Season 2	
2024	Family by Choice	Kang Hae-jun		
2024	Hellbound	Eun-yul	Season 2 (cameo)	
2024	Love Your Enemy	Yoon Jae-ho (young)	Cameo	
2025	Resident Playbook	Jang Hong-do	Special appearance	
2025	Shin's Project	Jo Philip		
2026	The Substitute †	Nam Jae-yeop		

=== Web series ===
Year	Title	Role	Notes	Ref.
2018–2019	Love Playlist	Park Ha-neul	Season 3–4	
2019	Pu Reum's Vlog	Park Ha-neul		
2020	Ending Again	Guy at church	Eepisode 2 (cameo)	

=== Music video appearances ===
Year	Title	Artist
2019	"Vacance in September"	Kim Jae-hwan and Stella Jang
2019	"The Different Day" (예전의오늘)	Lee Woo
2026	"Wicked Game"	USPEER

=== Television shows ===
Year	Title	Original title	Notes
2021	Three Meals a Day Doctors	슬기로운 산촌생활	(EP 6 & 7) Cast member

== Awards and nominations ==
Name of the award ceremony, year presented, category, nominee of the award, and the result of the nomination
Award ceremony	Year	Category	Nominee / Work	Result	Ref.
Blue Dragon Series Awards	2025	Best New Actor	Gyeongseong Creature 2	Nominated	
Brand of the Year Awards	2022	Best New Actor	Bae Hyun-sung	Won	
Korea Drama Awards	2023	Global Star Award	Miraculous Brothers	Won	
Korea First Brand Awards	2025	Rising Star	Bae Hyun-sung	Won	
