= Start-Up (film) =

2019 South Korean comedy-drama film

- Theatrical release poster
- Hangul: 시동
- RR: Sidong
- MR: Sidong
- Directed by: Choi Jung-yeol
- Screenplay by: Choi Jung-yeol
- Based on: Start by Jo Geum-san
- Produced by: Kang Hye-jung; Jo Sung-min; Ryoo Seung-wan
- Starring: Ma Dong-seok; Park Jeong-min; Jung Hae-in; Yum Jung-ah; Choi Sung-eun
- Cinematography: Lee Hyung-bin
- Edited by: Lee Gang-hui
- Music by: Kim Chang-seop
- Production company: Filmmaker R&K
- Distributed by: Next Entertainment World
- Release date: December 18, 2019
- Running time: 102 minutes
- Country: South Korea
- Language: Korean
- Budget: ₩9 billion
- Box office: US$24.1 million

Start-Up (Korean: 시동; RR: Sidong; lit. Start) is a 2019 South Korean comedy-drama film written and directed by Choi Jung-yeol. Based on the webtoon Start by Jo Geum-san, the film stars Ma Dong-seok, Park Jeong-min, Jung Hae-in, Yum Jung-ah and Choi Sung-eun. It was released on December 18, 2019.

== Plot ==
Against his mother's advice, Go Taek-il leaves home and ends up working at a Chinese restaurant run by a huge man named Geo-seok. At the same time, his friend Woo Sang-pil starts working for a private loan business. The two young men experience the ups and downs of being adults.

Taek-il, a rebel who only deviates from day to day. That day too, was caught by the police station for riding without a helmet with his best friend Sangpil, who bought a second-hand motorcycle by paying the school fees for the GED. Taek-il, who was slapped by his mother Jeong-hye who ran after receiving her call, left the house impulsively the next day and headed for Gunsan. He had nothing to do, so he stopped by a nearby Chinese restaurant to eat, but when he saw the short-haired chef Megaseok, he felt unusual energy.

Afterward, when he sees a job posting at a Chinese restaurant asking for a delivery man, he immediately enters the store and volunteers to write for him. As soon as he saw the option, the president noticed that he was a child who left home at once, and said that it would be difficult for him to run away for a longer period of time. After that, Taek-il lives with the president's house, and he gets close to mega-seok as well.

Meanwhile, Sang-pil, who lives with his grandmother with dementia, desperately needs a job and finds a job with the help of his acquaintance brother, Dong-hwa Kim. That job is loan business. At first, I expected that Dong-hwa would make a lot of money with just a little effort because the work was done so peacefully. However, when he went to a butcher's shop to collect money, he was beaten nice by the boss and became sick, and when he found out that among the customers who had borrowed money from the company, Taek-il's mother Jeong-hye changed the situation.

In addition, the toast shop that Jeong-hye opened while using her debt was ordered to be demolished because it was an illegal building. Taek-il, who learned of this after a while, rushed to the store, but was helpless by the tyranny of the loan sharks.

== Cast ==
- Ma Dong-seok as Geo-seok
- Park Jeong-min as Go Taek-il
- Jung Hae-in as Woo Sang-pil
- Yum Jung-ah as Yoon Jung-hye
- Choi Sung-eun as So Kyung-joo
- Kim Jong-soo as President Gong
- Bang Eun-jung as Kim Go-eun
- Yoon Kyung-ho as Kim Dong-hwa
- Kim Kyeong-deok as Bae Goo-man
- Lee Hae-woon as Moon Sung-hyun
- Sung Hyuk as Kang Dae-cheon
- Hong In as Park Doo-man
- Yoo Su-bin as Sergeant
- Baek Joo-hee as Ticket counter staff
- Kim Min-jae as Kwak Sung-moo
- Go Doo-shim as Sang-pil's grandmother
- Park Hae-joon as Tae-sung

== Production ==
Principal photography began on March 8, 2019 and filming was completed on June 27.

== Reception ==
=== Critical response ===
Yoon Min-sik of The Korea Herald said that "the film initially felt like unoriginal, unfunny film, but it does a good job of creating likeable characters". However, "outside of the characters, the film doesn't really offer much" as "the story is never sufficiently developed enough to be appealing" and "a lot of the jokes fall flat." Kim Boram of Yonhap gave a similar review, mentioning a story which "loses humor and becomes discursive and distracted as the film tries to deal with too many social issues" and a "corny and formulaic plot" with "not-so-flashy action scenes [that] will disappoint those who expect a big blockbuster."

=== Accolades ===
Year	Award	Category	Recipient(s)	Result	Ref.
2020	25th Chunsa Film Art Awards	Best New Actress	Choi Sung-eun	Won	
