= Paradise Lost (2026 film) =

South Korean psychological thriller film by Yeon Sang-ho

- Theatrical release poster
- Hangul: 실낙원
- RR: Sillagwon
- MR: Sillagwŏn
- Directed by: Yeon Sang-ho
- Screenplay by: Yeon Sang-ho; Ryu Yong-jae
- Based on: Black Inferno by Oh Seong-eun
- Produced by: Yang Yoo-min Hailey
- Starring: Kim Hyun-joo; Bae Hyun-sung
- Cinematography: Song Hyun-suk
- Edited by: Park Ju-ae
- Music by: Chai Min-joo
- Production company: Wow Point
- Distributed by: CJ Entertainment
- Release dates: September 13, 2026 (TIFF); October 21, 2026 (South Korea)
- Running time: 101 minutes
- Country: South Korea
- Language: Korean
- Budget: $340,000
- Box office: $1.1 million

Paradise Lost (Korean: 실낙원) is a 2026 South Korean psychological thriller film directed and co-written by Yeon Sang-ho. Based on the novel Black Inferno by Oh Sung-eun, it follows the events that unfold after Sun-woo, a boy who went missing, suddenly returns home nine years later.

The film had its world premiere in Special Presentations at the Toronto International Film Festival on 13 September 2026. It was released on 21 October 2026, in South Korean theaters, following its premiere at Busan International Film Festival. The film received mixed reviews from critics.

== Synopsis ==
Sun-woo, a boy who disappeared nine years ago from school camping bus, suddenly comes back home. During his absence, his mother, So-young, dealt with her sadness by using an AI program that showed her a virtual version of Sun-woo as a child. But when the real, grown Sun-woo returns, he feels strange and different to her. Instead of comfort, his presence makes her uneasy, and living together becomes tense and uncomfortable, setting the stage for an uneasy mother-and-son relationship.

== Cast ==
- Kim Hyun-joo as Ryu So-young
- Bae Hyun-sung as Ryu Sun-woo

== Production ==
The cast of Kim Hyun-joo and Bae Hyun-sung was confirmed on 24 November 2025, and principal photography began in December 2025.

== Release ==
Paradise Lost had world premiere in Special Presentations at the Toronto International Film Festival on 13 September 2026. It was also screened in 'Gala' section of the 31st Busan International Film Festival on 9 October 2026. It is invited to the Hawaiʻi International Film Festival in Spotlight on Korea section and will be screened on 1 November 2026. It is sold to 118 countries worldwide following its invitation to the festival.

It will be screened in the Twilight Zone section of the Stockholm International Film Festival on 12 November 2026.

It was released in South Korean theaters on 21 October by CJ Entertainment.

Ahead of its premiere, the film was acquired by Well Go USA Entertainment for North American release.

== Reception ==
=== Box office ===
The film was released on 808 screens and registered 14,196 viewers on its opening day.

As of 22 October 2026, the film has grossed US$266,660 from 38,183 admissions.

=== Critical Reception ===
On the review aggregator website Rotten Tomatoes, 40% of 15 critics' reviews are positive. On Metacritic, which uses a weighted average, Paradise Lost has a score of 57 out of 100 based on 6 critics, indicating "mixed or average" reviews.

Alisha Mughal, writing for RogerEbert.com, gave the film two and a half stars out of four, writing, "Paradise Lost has threads of many ideas running through it, but it doesn't handle any of them with the same deftness as it does intergenerational madness."
