= The Sound of Magic =

2022 South Korean Netflix TV series

- Promotional poster
- Hangul: 안나라수마나라
- RR: Annarasumanara
- MR: Annarasumanara
- Genre: Musical; Fantasy; Coming of Age
- Based on: Webtoon Annarasumanara by Ha Il-kwon
- Developed by: Netflix
- Written by: Kim Min-jeong
- Directed by: Kim Seong-yoon
- Starring: Ji Chang-wook; Choi Sung-eun; Hwang In-youp
- Music by: Park Seong-il
- Country of origin: South Korea
- Original language: Korean
- No. of seasons: 1
- No. of episodes: 6

Production
- Camera setup: Multi camera
- Running time: 62–77 minutes
- Production companies: SLL; Zium Content

Original release
- Network: Netflix
- Release: May 6, 2022

The Sound of Magic (Korean: 안나라수마나라; RR: Annarasumanara) is a 2022 South Korean television series based on the Naver webtoon Annarasumanara (Note: The title "Annarasumanara" refers to a Korean magic word used similarly to "abracadabra".) by Ha Il-kwon. It is directed by Kim Seong-yoon, written by Kim Min-jeong, and starring Ji Chang-wook, Choi Sung-eun, and Hwang In-youp. The series tells the story of a mysterious magician named Ri Eul who suddenly appears in front of Yoon Ah-yi, a girl who lost her dreams, and Na Il-deung, a boy who is forced to dream. The series was released on May 6, 2022, exclusively by Netflix.

== Synopsis ==
Yoon Ah-yi, an impoverished student at Sewoon High School, has stopped believing in magic since childhood, and, after significant misfortunes, wishes to grow up faster to escape the stress of her life. She then meets Ri Eul, a magician who wants to remain a child, although he has been an adult. After being a frequent visitor to Ri Eul's residence at an abandoned amusement park, Ah-yi's classmate Na Il-deung, a cold and well-off student, starts to spy on her magic lessons and, as a result, starts to show a liking for Ah-yi and magic. Ah-yi's life changes as she becomes a follower of Ri Eul, once again believing in magic and pursuing her dreams.

== Cast ==
=== Main ===
- Ji Chang-wook as Ri Eul / Ryu Min-hyuk
  - Nam Da-reum as young Min-hyuk

A mysterious magician who lives in an abandoned amusement park. He wants to remain a child even in adulthood.

- Choi Sung-eun as Yoon Ah-yi (Note: "Ah-yi" literally means "child" in Korean.)
  - Joo Ye-rim as young Ah-yi

A high school student who lives alone with her younger sister and wants to grow up sooner than later. She struggles to make a living.

- Hwang In-youp as Na Il-deung (Note: "Il-deung" literally means "number one" in Korean.)
  - Choi Seung-hoon as young Il-deung

A gifted and wealthy high school boy who comes across as cold and silent, and is always immersed in his studies. He is Ah-yi's classmate and develops a liking towards her. His life and career changed after meeting Ri Eul.

=== Supporting ===
==== Yoon Ah-yi's family ====
- Jo Han-chul as Yoon Ah-yi's father
- Hong Jung-min as Yoon Yoo-yi, Yoon Ah-yi's younger sister

==== Na Il-deung's family ====
- Yoo Jae-myung as Na Il-deung's father Na Ji-man
- Kim Hye-eun as Na Il-deung's mother

==== Sewoon High School ====
- Ji Hye-won as Baek Ha-na, classmate of Yoon Ah-yi and Na Il-deung
- Kim Bo-yoon as Kim So-hee, classmate of Yoon Ah-yi and Na Il-deung
- Oh So-hyun as Seo Ha-yoon, classmate of Yoon Ah-yi and Na Il-deung
- Lim Ki-hong as homeroom teacher Li Ki-hong

==== Others ====
- Yoon Kyung-ho as Kim Doo-shik. Owner of the supermarket Nice-on.
- Choi Young-joon as Detective Kim
- Kim Bada as Detective Park
- Park Ha-na as Min Ji-soo
  - Hong Seo-hee as young Min Ji-soo
- Yoon Sa-bong as Yoon Ah-yi's landlady
- Ryu Kyung-soo as a part-time employee at a convenience store
- Park Seul-gi as Bella, Ri Eul's parrot (voice appearance)
- Woo Mi-hwa as Seo Ha-yeon's Mother.

== Episodes ==
No.	Title	Directed by	Written by	Original release date
1	"Do You... Believe in Magic?"	Kim Seong-yoon	Kim Min-jeong	May 6, 2022
Yoon Ah-yi, a poor school girl, works part-time and takes care of her younger sister in the absence of her bankrupt father. In school, she gets to know Na Il-deung, who is the top student in the class save for being beaten in mathematics by Ah-yi. She gets picked on by Baek Ha-na and So-hee frequently. Ah-yi meets a magician, Ri Eul, at an abandoned amusement park, in whom she finds hope to make her problems disappear. When she asks her boss for an advance payment so she can pay her rent, her boss agrees but then begins groping her. The magician arrives and makes the boss disappear.
2	"Don't Let Me Dream Any Longer"	Kim Seong-yoon	Kim Min-jeong	May 6, 2022
In school Il-deung approaches Ah-yi for a date, but chickens out before he can ask. A girl goes missing. Loan sharks come to Ah-yi's house and demand to know the whereabouts of her father. Ri-Eul intercepts them but gets badly beaten up, leading to Ah-yi requesting that he stay away from her. She is again approached by Il-deung, who says he'll pay her to get lower scores in the upcoming math exam.
3	"Merry-Go-Round"	Kim Seong-yoon	Kim Min-jeong	May 6, 2022
Ah-yi starts learning magic from Ri Eul. Il-deung, becoming curious about her relationship with the magician, follows her to her magic lessons and meets Ri-Eul. They watch Ri-Eul performing magic together and get closer. A photo of Il-deung giving money to Ah-yi gets leaked on an online forum, spreading around the school.
4	"Becoming an Adult"	Kim Seong-yoon	Kim Min-jeong	May 6, 2022
Ah-yi refuses to speak when first confronted about why Il-deung was giving her money. Ha-na plants a camera in Ri-Eul's office. When Ah-yi's dad reappears and takes Ah-yi's money she got from her deal with Il-deung, she finally admits to her deal with Il-deung and the test scores. Il-deung's parents and the school make it look like Il-deung gave Ah-yi money out of generosity. Il-deung questions his future. Yoo-yi goes missing but turns out to be ok. The police suspect Ri Eul of a case of a missing student. Baek Ha-na discovers shocking footage from the spy camera she hid in Ri Eul's room. Ri Eul lets Ah-yi meet her younger self.
5	"Curse of Asphalt"	Kim Seong-yoon	Kim Min-jeong	May 6, 2022
After watching the footage given by Ha-na, Ah-yi still believes in Ri Eul. Ah-yi stands up to Ha-na. Il-deung begins to wonder what he really wants to do outside of what his parents want. Ha-na sneaks into the park but gets caught by Ri Eul. Police and Detective Kim arrive at school and question Ah-yi about the magician. The store owner, Kim Doo-shik has returned in an aggressive way. Ill-deung gets scolded by his parents and loses control at school. A body is found in a lake.
6	"The Last Performance"	Kim Seong-yoon	Kim Min-jeong	May 6, 2022
Police and Detective Kim arrive at Ri Eul's residence and arrest him. Ah-yi and Il-deung come to know the truth of Ri Eul's past. During the investigation, Ri Eul disappears. Later, police find the real culprit.

== Production ==
=== Development ===
The series reunited director Kim Seong-yoon and writer Kim Min-jeong who previously worked together in the 2016 drama Love in the Moonlight. The series was choreographed by Hong Se-jeong of the musicals Phantom and Laughing Man, while illusionist Lee Eun-gyeol served as the magic advisor. Music director Park Seong-il and lyricist Kim Eana were in charge of the music. Ji Chang-wook practiced magic for three months to play his role.

=== Casting ===
In December 2020, it was announced that Ji Chang-wook was offered the role of the magician in the series. In the same month, Hwang In-youp was also reported to have been offered the role of Na Il-deung. In February 2021, it was reported that Choi Sung-eun was in talks to appear in the drama as Yoon Ah-yi. In April 2021, Netflix officially announced production as well as casting confirmation with Ji Chang-wook, Choi Sung-eun, and Hwang In-yeop.

=== Filming ===
On July 26, 2021, it was reported that Ji Chang-wook and one of the staff members tested positive for COVID-19. As the actor self-quarantined as per protocol, the filming for the series was suspended. On August 11, 2021, filming resumed as it was reported that Ji Chang-wook had recovered from COVID-19. Filming ended in September 2021.

== Music ==
The music of this fantasy music drama was composed by music director Park Seong-il, and the lyrics are by Kim Eana, Seo Dong-seong, and Lee Chi-hoon. The production team had worked together to create the music for 18 months. Director Park Seong-il said, "Once the script was completed, I started composing and took singing lessons for the actors during meetings." Praising the enthusiasm and hard work of the actors during the work period, he said, "I recorded every day for over a year. I needed concentration every moment enough to practice like a recording." Choi Sung-eun said, "As singing was a task, I went to the recording studio every day." Ji Chang-wook said that he worked while talking a lot with the production team about "how to express the emotions of the characters at the point where there was a transition to the music in the play."

=== Soundtrack ===
The soundtrack was composed by Park Seong-il on the lyrics of Kim Eana. Aside from Park Seong-il and Kim Eana, the drama's music was also recorded with the Czech National Symphony Orchestra. The string recording was done in the second half of 2021 alongside composer Kim Seon Kyong.

A pre-released song from the soundtrack titled "Annarasumanara" (Korean: 아저씨. 마술을 믿으세요?; lit. 'Mister, Do You Believe in Magic?'), rendered by Ji Chang-wook and Choi Sung-eun was released by Vlending Co., Ltd, on April 28, 2022. The full soundtrack was officially released simultaneously with the worldwide release of the series on May 6.

==== Tracklist ====
The Sound of Magic

Soundtrack album
- Released: May 6, 2022
- Genre: Soundtrack
- Languages: Korean; English
- Label: Vlending

Disc 1
No.	Title	Lyrics	Music	Artist	Length
1.	"Magic In You"	Kim Eana	Park Seong-il	Ji Chang-wook; Sondia; Ye.Z; Lee Yeseul	3:03
2.	"My Dream Family" (꿈꾸는 나의 집)	Seo Dong-seong	Park Seong-il	Choi Sung-eun	3:16
3.	"Do You Believe In Magic?" (당신 마술을 믿습니까?)	Kim Eana	Park Seong-il	Ji Chang-wook	4:19
4.	"Don't Make Me Dream" (나를 꿈꾸게 하지 마세요)	Kim Eana	Park Seong-il	Ji Chang-wook; Choi Sung-eun	2:59
5.	"I Mean It" (진지해 지금)	Kim Eana	Park Seong-il	Hwang In-youp	2:15
6.	"Merry-Go-Round" (회전목마)	Kim Eana	Park Seong-il	Ji Chang-wook; Choi Sung-eun	3:35
7.	"A Curse of Asphalt" (아스팔트의 저주)	Seo Dong-seong	Park Seong-il	Ji Chang-wook	3:26
8.	"Have A Good Night" (잘자)	Seo Dong-seong	Park Seong-il	Choi Sung-eun; Hong Jung-min	4:08
9.	"Consolation" (위로)	Seo Dong-seong; Seo Yi-jun	Park Seong-il	Choi Sung-eun	2:25
10.	"I, As A Grown Up Or A Child" (어른과 아이)	Kim Eana	Park Seong-il	Choi Sung-eun	3:45
11.	"Annarasumanara" (아저씨. 마술을 믿으세요?)	Kim Eana	Park Seong-il	Ji Chang-wook; Choi Sung-eun	3:37
12.	"Fantasy"	Lee Chi-hoon	Park Seong-il	Various Artists	3:13
13.	"A Curse of Asphalt" (Demo Ver.)	Zach Holmes	Park Seong-il	Zach Holmes	3:32
14.	"I Mean It" (Album Ver.)	Kim Eana	Park Seong-il	Hwang In-youp	3:26
15.	"Fantasy" (English Band Ver.)	Lee Chi-hoon	Park Seong-il	Sondia; Namjong	3:25
16.	"Merry-Go-Round" (Demo Ver.)	Kim Eana	Park Seong-il	Sondia; Namjong	3:32
17.	"Annarasumanara" (Demo Ver.)	Kim Eana	Park Seong-il	Sondia; Namjong	3:37
18.	"Fantasy" (Korean Band Ver.)	Lee Chi-hoon	Park Seong-il	Sondia; Namjong	3:25
Total length:					60:58

== Reception ==
=== Critical response ===
On the review aggregator website Rotten Tomatoes, 100% of 5 critics' reviews are positive, with an average rating of 7.1/10.

Kayti Burt of Paste rated the series 7.3 out of 10 and felt that "lack of narrative clarity keeps The Sound of Magic from becoming something special". Burt appreciated the direction of Kim Seong-yoon and wrote, the "dazzling visuals and the cast's earnest performances (and solid vocals), make for an enjoyable, brief trip around this merry-go-round ride of a story."

John Serba, reviewing for Decider wrote, "The overlong episodes could be nipped and tucked here and there, but The Sound of Magic offers a fine balance of smart and silly." Serba opinion, "Fans of K-stuff will probably love it." Pierce Conran of the South China Morning Post gave 3 stars out of 5 and criticized the narrative for "surprising lack of characters, locations and even extras." Concluding his review, Conran wrote, "In the end this is a half-baked fable that could have been so much more. It's the sound of magic without the feeling of it."

=== Viewership ===
The Sound of Magic was ranked 7th globally in the Netflix TV shows (Non-English) category, one day after its release. On May 11, it ranked no 3 in South Korea, and globally it was at 4th place in the Netflix TV shows (Non-English) category.

== Awards and nominations ==
Name of the award ceremony, year presented, category, nominee of the award, and the result of the nomination
Award ceremony	Year	Category	Nominee	Result	Ref.
APAN Star Awards	2022	Global Star Award	Ji Chang-wook	Won	

== See also ==
- Young Actors' Retreat (2022)
