= Choi Sung-eun =

South Korean actress (born 1996)

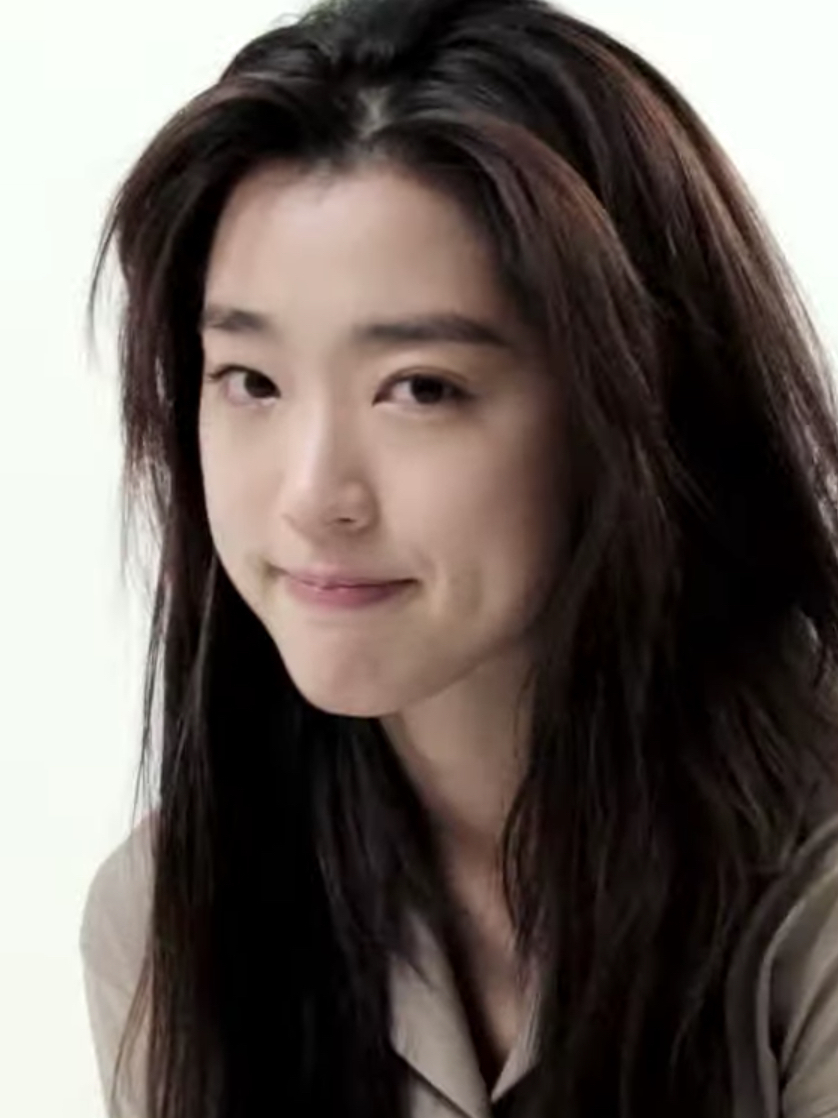
- Choi in November 2020
- Born: June 17, 1996 (age 30); Seoul, South Korea
- Education: Korea National University of Arts (Department of Acting)
- Occupation: Actress
- Years active: 2018–present
- Agent: Ace Factory

Korean name
- Hangul: 최성은
- Hanja: 崔成垠
- RR: Choe Seongeun
- MR: Ch'oe Sŏngŭn

Choi Sung-eun (Korean: 최성은; born June 17, 1996) is a South Korean actress. She is known for roles in television dramas such as SF8 (2020), Beyond Evil (2021), and The Sound of Magic (2022), as well as in the Netflix film My Name Is Loh Kiwan (2024).

== Early life and education ==
Choi Sung-eun was born on June 17, 1996, in Seoul, South Korea. Choi's family consists of her parents, an older brother, and a younger brother. She attended Kaywon High School of Arts under the Department of Theater and Film before getting admitted at the Korea National University of Arts' Acting Department in 2015.

== Career ==
=== 2018: Beginnings ===
Choi started out acting in short films and as a theater actress at the Doosan Art Center. In 2018, she played the role of Autumn, a girl waiting for an organ transplant in the theater play Grain in the Blood. As a college student, Choi was featured as a cover of popular university magazine, Life Magazine College Tomorrow's 853 issue for 20s which drew the attention of industry officials and various management companies. In July 2018, Choi officially signed an exclusive contract with SALT Entertainment officially starting her career as a rookie actress.

=== 2019–present: Acting debut ===
Choi landed her first major role in a feature film after passing an audition for the comedy film Start-Up (2019) where she played the role of red-haired girl So Kyung-joo. For her scene-stealing performance, she won Best New Actress from the Chunsa Film Festival and earned another nomination from the Buil Film Awards in South Korea.

In 2020, Choi appeared in the short film, Nipple War 3. In April of the same year, Choi made her CRT debut through the MBC drama SF8 : Joan's Galaxy (Ep. 3). Her first lead role in an independent film, Ten Months was also screened during the 21st Jeonju International Film Festival under the category "Korean Cinema". In August 2020, Choi signed an exclusive contract with Ace Factory.

In 2021, Choi joined the JTBC drama Beyond Evil as Manyang butcher shop owner Yoo Jae-yi, marking her debut in a mini series. Following her performance, Choi was nominated for the 57th Baeksang Arts Awards in the category Best New Actress – Television. In April, she joined the Netflix series The Sound of Magic, playing the role of Yoon Ah-yi alongside Ji Chang-wook and Hwang In-youp in her first main role in a drama series. Later in August 2021, Choi was cast in the Wave's original film Gentleman as prosecutor Kim Hwa-jin, which premiered in 2022, alongside Joo Ji-hoon and Park Sung-woong. Later in October, Choi's independent film, Ten Months was released commercially in cinemas.

In 2024, Choi played the titular character Lee Marie in the drama film My Name Is Loh Kiwan alongside Song Joong-ki, which was released exclusively on Netflix on March 1, 2024.

== Filmography ==
=== Film ===
Year	Title	Role	Notes	Ref.
2018	I Want to go to Paris	Yeon-i	Short film	
2019	Start-Up	So Kyung-joo		
2019	Graduation Film	Chae-eun	Short film	
2019	The Dog Days	Jae-ha	Short film	
2019	Pus	Eun-soo	Short film	
2020	Nipple War 3	Chae-eun	Short film	
2021	Ten Months	Choi Mi-rae		
2022	Gentleman	Kim Hwa-jin		
2024	My Name Is Loh Kiwan	Marie Lee	Netflix film	
2024	Time to Be Strong	Sumin	Independent film	
	Mad Dance Office	Yeon Kyung		

=== Television series ===
Year	Title	Role	Notes	Ref.
2020	SF8	Yi-oh	Episode 3: Joan's Galaxy	
2021	Beyond Evil	Yoo Jae-yi		
2025	Last Summer	Song Ha-kyung		

=== Web series ===
Year	Title	Role	Ref.
2022	The Sound of Magic	Yoon Ah-yi	

=== Web shows ===
Year	Title	Role	Ref.
2022	Young Actors' Retreat	Cast member	

== Discography ==
=== Soundtrack appearances ===
Title	Year	Album	Ref.
"My Dream Family" (꿈꾸는 나의 집)	2022	The Sound of Magic OST	
"Don't Make Me Dream" (나를 꿈꾸게 하지 마세요)	2022	The Sound of Magic OST	
"Merry-Go-Round" (회전목마) (with Ji Chang-wook)	2022	The Sound of Magic OST	
"Annarasumanara" (아저씨. 마술을 믿으세요?) (with Ji Chang-wook)	2022	The Sound of Magic OST	
"Have A Good Night" (잘자) Hong Jung-min	2022	The Sound of Magic OST	
"Consolation" (위로)	2022	The Sound of Magic OST	
"I, As A Grown Up Or A Child" (어른과 아이)	2022	The Sound of Magic OST	

== Theater ==
Year	Title	Role	Ref.
2018	Grain in the Blood (피와 씨앗)	Autumn	

== Ambassadorship ==
- Public Relations Ambassador for the 27th Seoul International Women's Film Festival (2025).

== Awards and nominations ==
Name of the award ceremony, year presented, category, nominee of the award, and the result of the nomination
Award ceremony	Year	Category	Nominee / Work	Result	Ref.
APAN Star Awards	2022	Best New Actress	Beyond Evil	Nominated	
Baeksang Arts Awards	2021	Best New Actress – Television	Beyond Evil	Nominated	
Baeksang Arts Awards	2022	Best New Actress – Film	Ten Months	Nominated	
Buil Film Awards	2020	Best New Actress	Start-Up	Nominated	
Buil Film Awards	2022	Best New Actress	Ten Months	Won	
Chunsa Film Art Awards	2020	Best New Actress	Start-Up	Won	
Jeonju International Film Festival	2024	Best Actress	Time to Be Strong	Won	
32nd Korean Culture and Entertainment Awards	2024	Best Actress	Ro Ki-wan	Won	
Stage Talk Audience's Choice Awards (SACA)	2018	Best New Theater Actress	Grain in the Blood	Nominated	
