= Pro Bono =

2025 South Korean television series

- Promotional poster
- Hangul: 프로보노
- RR: Peurobono
- MR: P'ŭrobono
- Genre: Legal drama
- Written by: Moon Yoo-seok
- Directed by: Kim Seong-yoon; Baek Sang-hoon
- Starring: Jung Kyung-ho; So Joo-yeon; Lee Yoo-young; Yoon Na-moo; Seo Hye-won; Kang Hyung-suk
- Music by: Park Sung-il
- Country of origin: South Korea
- Original language: Korean
- No. of episodes: 12

Production
- Running time: 60 minutes
- Production companies: Studio Dragon; Sequence One; Lotte Cultureworks; Studio Flow

Original release
- Network: tvN
- Release: December 6, 2025 – January 11, 2026

Pro Bono (Korean: 프로보노) is a 2025–2026 South Korean legal drama television series written by Moon Yoo-seok, directed by Kim Seong-yoon and Baek Sang-hoon, and starring Jung Kyung-ho, So Joo-yeon, Lee Yoo-young, Yoon Na-moo, Seo Hye-won, and Kang Hyung-suk. The series follows a high-achieving but arrogant judge who is forced to become a public interest lawyer. It aired on tvN from December 6, 2025, to January 11, 2026, every Saturday and Sunday at 21:10 (KST). It is also available for streaming on Netflix.

== Synopsis ==
Kang Da-wit, a former judge turned public interest lawyer had fame, a perfect image, and a huge following on social media. However, his life took an unexpected turn, forcing him to start over in a humble role.

== Cast ==
=== Main ===
- Jung Kyung-ho as Kang Da-wit
  - Park Yoon-ho as teen Da-wit
  - Choi Jae-yoon as young Da-wit

A former judge who becomes a public interest lawyer.

- So Joo-yeon as Park Gi-ppeum
  - Kim Tae-yeon as young Gi-ppeum

A law expert who earns admiration through in-depth knowledge.

=== Supporting ===
==== Pro Bono Team Members ====
- Yoon Na-moo as Jang Yeong-sil

An activist in the labor union. His estranged father is the powerful conglomerate Chairman Jang Hyun-bae.

- Seo Hye-won as Yoo Nan-hee
- Kang Hyung-suk as Hwang Jun-woo

==== O&Partners People ====
- Lee Yoo-young as Oh Jung-in

Oh Gyu-jang's daughter. Her ambition is to transform O&Partners into a world-class law firm by prioritizing the law firm's growth and her own goals over justice and truth.

- Kim Kap-soo as Oh Gyu-jang

Founder of the leading law firm O&Partners, a figure of powerful lobbyist controlling political policy behind the scenes.

- Choi Dae-hoon as Woo Myung-hoon

=== Guest appearances ===
- Shin Hye-ji as Baek Han-byeol, the granddaughter of Baek Joong-seop, who runs a dog café.
- Lee Moon-sik as Shin Jung-suk, Chief Justice (Ep. 1, 4, 9–12)
- Kim Jung-young as Kim Sung-rye, Kang Da-wit's mother whose hand was severed due to excessive overtime in Yoo Jae-bum's father's factory and then passed away suddenly when Da-wit was a high school student (Ep. 1, 2, 5, 9)
- Yun Je-wook as Yoo Jae-bum, a conman who pretended to be Kang Da-wit's elementary school classmate in order to take revenge against Da-wit by framing him for receiving a bribe (Ep. 1, 8–10)
- Lee Kang-wook as Kim Do-hoon / Goo Ji-hwan, a journalist who is friends with Kang Da-wit and a lawyer who earns money by taking on cases through illegal means (Ep. 1, 2, 4, 6–9)
- Sung Dong-il as Choi Ho-jip, Chief Judge who is notorious for his prickly nature in the legal community (Ep. 2)
- Yoon Sang-jung as Ji So-yun, the rescuer of the puppy Byuli (Ep. 2)
- Lee Chun-moo as Kim Kang-hoon, a 12-year-old child on wheelchair due to paraplegia and wants to sue God for damages (Ep. 3, 4)
- Jung Sae-byul as Jung So-min, Kang-hoon's mother who is pushed to the limits of life while raising her disabled son alone (Ep. 3, 4)
- Yoo Jae-myung as Choi Woong-san, Woongsan Group and hospital's chairman who advocates anti-abortion hospital policy due to his religious beliefs (Ep. 4)
- Choi Hee-jin as Kim Jin-oh, a visually impaired judge (Ep. 3)
- Lee Dae-yun as Kook Young-joon, the appellate court judge (Ep. 3, 4)
- Jung Hoe-ryn as Kaya, an immigrant from Myanmar who wants a divorce due to her father-in-law's sexual assault (Ep. 5, 6)
- Sung Yu-jin as Goo Ji-won, the judge who grants Kaya's divorce case and allows her to maintain her residency status (Ep. 5, 6)
- Lee Jong-won as Jo Kang-ryul, Chief Judge who believes in South Korea being a country of freedom and justice (Ep. 6)
- Jung Ji-so as Elijah, popular singer/idol who has been continuously harassed by cyber-bullying activist Ma Young-sook and by some fans obsessed with her (Ep. 7, 8)
- Oh Min-ae as Cha Jin-hee, Elijah's domineering and manipulative mother who is the CEO of her agency 'EK Entertainment' (Ep. 7, 8)
- Jang Deok-su as Kang Min-ha, employee at a luxury brand store taking the stand as a key witness against Cha Jin-hee (Ep. 8)
- Kim Yong-joon as Yoon Baek-man, Yoo Jae-bum's father who owned a paper factory where Kang Da-wit's mother worked (Ep. 9, 10)
- Song Young-chang as Jang Hyun-bae, a powerful conglomerate chairman who was sentenced to a heavy prison term by Kang Da-wit for habitual assaults on employees and a forced sexual assault on a domestic helper (Ep. 1, 11–12)

== Production ==
=== Development ===
Pro Bono is written by Moon Yoo-seok, directed by Kim Seong-yoon, planned by Studio Dragon, and co-produced by Sequence One, Lotte Cultureworks, and Studio Flow.

=== Casting ===
On February 19, 2025, it was reported that Jung Kyung-ho would star in the series. On March 26, Lee Yoo-young was reported to be cast as the lead. Jung Kyung-ho and So Joo-yeon were officially confirmed to star on April 28. On April 30, Choi Dae-hoon was set to make a special appearance. On October 30, Yoon Na-moo, Seo Hye-won, and Kang Hyung-suk were officially revealed to have joined the cast as part of the pro bono team alongside Jung and So.

=== Music ===
The OST singer lineup, which includes K.Will, Gyeong-gye, John Park, Namjong, and Yangpa, was unveiled by Curiosity Studio on December 1, 2025. The music director of the series is Park Sung-il.

== Release ==
On November 1, 2025, a teaser video was released, and the series was confirmed to premiere on tvN on December 6, airing every Saturday and Sunday at 21:10 (KST). It also streams on Netflix.

== Viewership ==
Pro Bono : South Korea viewers per episode (millions)

Season	Episode number												Average
Season	1	2	3	4	5	6	7	8	9	10	11	12	Average
1	1.029	1.439	1.197	1.802	0.963	1.868	1.443	2.116	1.366	1.970	1.734	2.416	1.612

Source: Audience measurement performed nationwide by Nielsen Korea.

Average TV viewership ratings
Ep.	Original broadcast date	Average audience share (Nielsen Korea)	
Ep.	Original broadcast date	Nationwide	Seoul
1	December 6, 2025	4.451% (1st)	4.136% (1st)
2	December 7, 2025	6.180% (1st)	6.017% (1st)
3	December 13, 2025	5.015% (1st)	5.067% (1st)
4	December 14, 2025	8.032% (1st)	8.148% (1st)
5	December 20, 2025	4.026% (1st)	4.010% (1st)
6	December 21, 2025	7.877% (1st)	7.438% (1st)
7	December 27, 2025	6.095% (1st)	6.154% (1st)
8	December 28, 2025	9.096% (1st)	9.486% (1st)
9	January 3, 2026	6.014% (1st)	6.025% (1st)
10	January 4, 2026	8.616% (1st)	8.608% (1st)
11	January 10, 2026	6.154% (1st)	5.544% (1st)
12	January 11, 2026	10.003% (1st)	9.574%(1st)
Average		6.797%	6.684%
In the table above, the blue numbers represent the lowest ratings and the red numbers represent the highest ratings.; This series aired on a cable channel/pay TV which normally has a relatively smaller audience compared to free-to-air TV/public broadcasters (KBS, SBS, MBC, and EBS).
