= Gyeongseong Creature =

2023–2024 South Korean television series

- Also known as: K Project
- Hangul: 경성크리처
- Hanja: 京城크리처
- RR: Gyeongseong keuricheo
- MR: Kyŏngsŏng k'ŭrich'ŏ
- Genre: Historical drama; Suspense; Mystery; Horror; Thriller; Action
- Written by: Kang Eun-kyung
- Directed by: Chung Dong-yoon; Roh Young-sub (season 1); Jo Yeong-min (season 2)
- Starring: Park Seo-joon; Han So-hee; Claudia Kim; Lee Moo-saeng; Bae Hyun-sung
- Music by: Kim Tae-seong
- Country of origin: South Korea
- Original languages: Korean; Japanese
- No. of seasons: 2
- No. of episodes: 17

Production
- Executive producers: Kim Do-hyuk (CP); Park Hee-seon; Kim Min-ji; So Jae-hyun; Kim Joon-hyuk
- Producers: Hwang Jee-woo; Jang Se-jung; Park Beom-soo; Park Eun-kyung
- Cinematography: Song Yo-hun
- Editors: Jo In-hyung; Lim Ho-cheol
- Running time: 43–78 minutes
- Production companies: Story & Pictures Media; Studio Dragon; Kakao Entertainment
- Budget: ₩70 billion

Original release
- Network: Netflix
- Release: December 22, 2023 – September 27, 2024

Gyeongseong Creature (Korean: 경성크리처) is a South Korean historical mystery-horror television series written by Kang Eun-kyung, directed by Jung Dong-yoon, Roh Young-sub and Jo Yeong-min, and starring Park Seo-joon, Han So-hee, Claudia Kim, Lee Moo-saeng and Bae Hyun-sung.

Set in 1945, during the occupation of Gyeongseong (the old name for Seoul) by the Imperial Japanese Army, the story depicts the brutality inflicted on civilians by the Japanese forces, subjecting men and women to secret biological experiments, the rebels who rise against them, and the monster creature produced from human experimentation. The story was inspired by the real-life Unit 731, a covert Japanese military unit that tested biological and chemical weapons on civilians during World War II.

The first season was released on Netflix from December 22, 2023 to January 5, 2024. The second season was released on September 27, 2024.

== Synopsis ==
=== Season 1 ===
In the spring of 1945 in Gyeongseong, during the Japanese occupation of Korea, Jang Tae-sang, the master of the city's most lucrative pawnshop, and Yoon Chae-ok, a tracker searching for her missing mother, confront a strange creature born from biological experiments conducted in secret within Ongseong Hospital.

=== Season 2 ===
Set in present-day Seoul, it is about the story of Ho-jae, who resembles Jang Tae-sang, and Yoon Chae-ok, who meet and explore the unfinished relationship, fate and evil relationship of Gyeongseong.

== Cast and characters ==
=== Main ===
- Park Seo-joon as Jang Tae-sang and Jang Ho-jae
1. Jang Tae-sang: A wealthy man in the 1940s who is the owner of the House of Golden Treasure (Geumokdang), the best pawnshop in Gyeongseong. He is also the best informant in Gyeongseong.
2. Jang Ho-jae: a man who resembles Tae-sang in present-day.
- Han So-hee as Yoon Chae-ok

A specialist in finding missing people.

- Claudia Kim as Yukiko Maeda (Japanese: 前田有紀子, Hepburn: Maeda Yukiko; main season 1; recurring season 2)

A powerful Japanese noblewoman from Kyoto, Japan, who secretly controls the Gyeongseong area.

- Lee Moo-saeng as Captain Kuroko (season 2)

The leader of an elite group at Jeonseung Biotech.

- Bae Hyun-sung as Seung-jo (season 2)

The son of Myeong-ja, who possesses certain special abilities.

=== Supporting ===
- Kim Hae-sook as Mrs. Nawol

A deacon of Geumokdang who has been with Tae-sang since he was a child. She guards and takes care of orders when the owner is not around.

- Jo Han-chul as Yoon Jung-won

Yoon Chae-ok's father and Choi Seong-sim's husband.

- Wi Ha-joon as Kwon Jun-taek

An independence activist and Tae-sang's close friend.

- Park Ji-hwan as Gu Gap-pyeong

Geumokdang's butler.

- Ok Ja-yeon as Na Young-chun

The owner of Moonlight Bar.

- Ahn Ji-ho as Park Beom-o

A boy who works at Geumokdang.

- Choi Young-joon as Lieutenant Colonel Kato (Japanese: 陸軍中将賀東, Hepburn: Rikugun-Chūjō Gatō)

The chief of the military at Onseong Hospital.

- Hyun Bong-sik as Ichiro (Japanese: 一郎, Hepburn: Ichirō)

The director of Onseong Hospital.

- Kim Do-hyun as Commissioner Ishikawa (Japanese: 石川委員, Hepburn: Kyokuchō Ishikawa)

The chief of Japanese police in Gyeongseong and Yukiko Maeda's husband.

- Woo Ji-hyun as Ryu Sachimoto (Japanese: 幸本龍, Hepburn: Sachimoto Ryū)

An artist who is assigned by Ichiro to draw the results of experiments at Onseong Hospital.

- Lee Kyu-sung as Mori

Ishikawa's subordinate, who is given the task of keeping an eye on Tae-sang.

- Ji Woo as Myeong-ja

A gisaeng from Chunwol-gwan and Ishikawa's mistress who has disappeared.

- Kang Mal-geum as Choi Seong-sim / Seishin

Chae-ok's mother, who is the subject of biological experiments by the Japanese military.

- Im Chul-soo as Mr. Oh

An independence activist disguised as a cleaner at Onseong Hospital in order to find his missing brother.

- Kim Yoon-woo as Choi Yeong-gwan
- Jo Jae-ryong as Soma

A Japanese military officer who is assigned to manage the prisoners at Ongseong Hospital's underground prison.

- Yeon Je-wook as Lee In-hyuk

An independence activist who is also Jun-taek's comrade.

- Kim Yool-ho

=== Special appearances ===
- Lee Ji-hyun as Young-kwan's mother
- Lim Ki-hong as Mr. Wang
- Woo Jung-won as Shim Sun-deok

Tae-sang's mother.

== Episodes ==
Season	Episodes		Originally released
1	10	7	December 22, 2023
1	10	3	January 5, 2024
2	7		September 27, 2024

=== Season 1 ===
No. overall	No. in season	Title	Directed by	Written by	Original release date
1	1	"Najin"; Transliteration: "Najin" (Korean: 나진; 納人)	Chung Dong-yoon & Roh Young-sub	Kang Eun-kyung	December 22, 2023
2	2	"Mother"; Transliteration: "Seongsim" (Korean: 성심; 惺沁)	Chung Dong-yoon & Roh Young-sub	Kang Eun-kyung	December 22, 2023
3	3	"Signal"; Transliteration: "Sinho" (Korean: 신호; 信號)	Chung Dong-yoon & Roh Young-sub	Kang Eun-kyung	December 22, 2023
4	4	"Imprinting"; Transliteration: "Gakin" (Korean: 각인; 刻印)	Chung Dong-yoon & Roh Young-sub	Kang Eun-kyung	December 22, 2023
5	5	"Desperation"; Transliteration: "Satu" (Korean: 사투; 死鬪)	Chung Dong-yoon & Roh Young-sub	Kang Eun-kyung	December 22, 2023
6	6	"Chaos"; Transliteration: "Hondon" (Korean: 혼돈; 混沌)	Chung Dong-yoon & Roh Young-sub	Kang Eun-kyung	December 22, 2023
7	7	"Chase"; Transliteration: "Sullae" (Korean: 술래; 鬼)	Chung Dong-yoon & Roh Young-sub	Kang Eun-kyung	December 22, 2023
8	8	"Awakening"; Transliteration: "Jagak" (Korean: 자각; 自覺)	Chung Dong-yoon & Roh Young-sub	Kang Eun-kyung	January 5, 2024
9	9	"Atrocity"; Transliteration: "Yaman" (Korean: 야만; 野蠻)	Chung Dong-yoon & Roh Young-sub	Kang Eun-kyung	January 5, 2024
10	10	"Tear"	Chung Dong-yoon & Roh Young-sub	Kang Eun-kyung	January 5, 2024

=== Season 2 ===
No. overall	No. in season	Title	Directed by	Written by	Original release date
11	1	"Ho-jae"; Transliteration: "Hojae" (Korean: 호재)	Chung Dong-yoon & Jo Yeong-min	Kang Eun-kyung	September 27, 2024
12	2	"Sign"; Transliteration: "Heunjeok" (Korean: 흔적)	Chung Dong-yoon & Jo Yeong-min	Kang Eun-kyung	September 27, 2024
13	3	"Pieces Of Memories"; Transliteration: "Papyeon" (Korean: 파편)	Chung Dong-yoon & Jo Yeong-min	Kang Eun-kyung	September 27, 2024
14	4	"The Other Side"; Transliteration: "Imyeon" (Korean: 이면)	Chung Dong-yoon & Jo Yeong-min	Kang Eun-kyung	September 27, 2024
15	5	"The Creature"; Transliteration: "Gwimul" (Korean: 귀물)	Chung Dong-yoon & Jo Yeong-min	Kang Eun-kyung	September 27, 2024
16	6	"Bait"; Transliteration: "Mikki" (Korean: 미끼)	Chung Dong-yoon & Jo Yeong-min	Kang Eun-kyung	September 27, 2024
17	7	"Marginal Man"; Transliteration: "Gyeonggyein" (Korean: 경계인)	Chung Dong-yoon & Jo Yeong-min	Kang Eun-kyung	September 27, 2024

== Background and production ==
=== Season 1 ===
Promotional poster incorporating several notable characters from the first season.

In January 2022, the production team confirmed the casting and revealed that the filming was currently in progress. On March 3, 2022, it was reported that Wi Ha-joon tested positive for COVID-19, and the filming was suspended since the actor was in self-quarantine. On August 3, 2022, it was reported that actress Han So-hee suffered a minor injury to her face while filming an action scene for the series. Han's agency confirmed on August 11 that she had recovered from the injury and returned to filming the following week. In October 2022, it was reported that the series had finished filming and started post-production.

=== Season 2 ===
Promotional poster incorporating several notable characters from the second season.

In November 2022, Netflix confirmed the production of a second season. The filming schedule had yet to be decided. In August 2023, it was announced that actor Bae Hyun-sung would be joining the cast of the second season. In September 2023, it was reported that Han So-hee felt unwell while filming the second season and was tested positive for COVID-19; she was recovering at home according to her agency.

In January 2024, Netflix announced that the second season would be set in the present time, and released in 2024. Also in the same month, producers confirmed that actors Lee Moo-saeng and Bae had joined the cast of the forthcoming season.

== Release ==
The first season of Gyeongseong Creature was exclusively released by Netflix on December 22, 2023. The series consists of 10 episodes, with the first seven released as Part 1, and the remaining three episodes released as Part 2 on January 5, 2024. Netflix released all seven episodes of the second season on September 27, 2024.

== Reception ==
=== Critical response ===
On the review aggregator website Rotten Tomatoes, 92% of 12 critics' reviews are positive, with an average rating of 7.3/10. Chase Hutchinson of Collider rated it 5/10, and said "the trouble is that the rest of the series just marches right past its most promising elements without stopping for more than a second". Jonathan Wilson of Ready Steady Cut proclaimed it "the combination of familiar elements in this specific composition is enough to provide plenty of consistent drama, especially given the sheer quality of the production". In Decider, Joel Keller said "despite our reservations, Gyeongseong Creature has a good story buried in all the murkiness but we're not sure if the show will actually be able to focus on that story as the first season goes along". Brian Lowry wrote in CNN Entertainment, "it might not match Squid Game's viewership, but for sheer entertainment value surpasses it in a way that deserves to be a monster hit". MJ Marfori from TV5 Philippines described the series "as blending suspense and romance and succeeding in that challenge" and "sure to be a popular worldwide K-series". Indonesian writer Ayu Utami stated that "the forties era sets and wardrobe were quite surprising".

Reviews for the second season were mixed to negative. Lee Yoon-seo of The Korea Herald wrote, "Although season 2 sought to address audience concerns by improving upon the slow pacing of the previous season, it may have compromised essential details in its emphasis on action and rapid development, while its core message [of the Japanese colonial era's effects on contemporary Korea] shoehorned in, rather than naturally coming through in the story." In the South China Morning Post, Pierce Conran gave it 1.5 out of 5 stars, saying, "By jumping forward to the present, setting the story across all of modern Seoul, giving its protagonists superpowers and broadening the range of villains, season two feels massively overstuffed. Both narratively and visually it is reminiscent of the stark drop in quality that occurred between the first and second seasons of Sweet Home." Rhian Daly of NME gave the season 3 out of 5 stars, saying, "It's not a bad premise, but it's also one that doesn't feel particularly fresh and does the series something of a disservice. There are some improvements to season one, like a speedier pace [...] and some intriguing twists. [...] Hopefully, Netflix and its creators will have the sense to leave it as it is – a fine, if slightly soured, ending."

=== Viewership ===
Gyeongseong Creature ranked first in South Korea three days after its release and Number 3 in Netflix's "Global Top 10" weekly list of the most-watched non-English television titles, receiving an enthusiastic response in 20 countries, including India, the Philippines, Singapore, Thailand, and Taiwan. It remained a Top 10 Netflix show for an additional three weeks. The first season entered the "Global Top 10" title again with the release of the second season, being the second most-watched show in Netflix's list of the "Global Top 10" (non-English) television titles. It retained its Global Top Ten position in the second week after release, and remained on the list for another two weeks. Additionally, Gyeongseong Creature was also the seventh most searched show on Google Philippines for 2024.

== Original soundtrack ==
=== Season 1 ===
The season one soundtrack of the series was led by music director and composer Kim Tae-seong.

==== Part 1 ====
Released on December 22, 2023
No.	Title	Lyrics	Music	Artist	Length
1.	"Forever"	4bout	4bout; Kime	Suho	3:37
2.	"Time"	Choe Jeong-in	Choe Jeong-in	Baek A	3:07
3.	"Time" (Elec. Ver.)	Choe Jeong-in	Choe Jeong-in	Leafy	3:59
4.	"Forever" (Inst.)		4bout; Kime		3:37
5.	"Time" (Inst.)		Choe Jeong-in		2:42
6.	"Time" (Elec. Ver.; Inst.)		Choe Jeong-in		3:59
Total length:					21:01

==== Part 2 ====
Released on January 12, 2024
No.	Title	Music	Length
1.	"Gyeongseong Creature Opening Title"	Choe Jeong-in	1:51
2.	"Gyeongseong Creature Main Theme"	Choe Jeong-in	1:56
3.	"Time" (Orchestra Ver.)	Choe Jeong-in; Kim Tae-seong	3:16
4.	"Maruta"	Choe Jeong-in; Kim Tae-seong	5:52
5.	"Ties"	Choe Jeong-in; Kim Tae-seong	2:52
6.	"Only"	Ong Seong-eun	3:11
7.	"My Fatherland"	Lim Mi-hyun	5:28
8.	"Keumokdang"	Kim Yeon-jeong	1:33
9.	"Cherry Blossom"	Choe Jeong-in	2:17
10.	"Mother"	Choe Jeong-in	3:19
11.	"Reasoning"	Lim Mi-hyun	3:02
12.	"The Birth of a Goddess"	Choe Jeong-in	2:02
13.	"In the Hospital"	Yoon Chae-young	3:22
14.	"Irrevocable"	Choe Jeong-in	3:47
15.	"Na Jin"	Choe Jeong-in	1:41
16.	"Sacrifice"	Choe Jeong-in	3:26
17.	"The Shape of Life"	Choe Jeong-in	2:36
18.	"Secreats"	Lim Mi-hyun	1:44
19.	"Same Dream"	Yoon Chae-young	2:46
20.	"To. My Daughter"	Choi Jeong-in	2:40
Total length:			58:41

=== Season 2 ===
Released on September 27, 2024
No.	Title	Lyrics	Music	Artist	Length
1.	"Gradation in Light"	Oh Dong-jun	Oh Dong-jun	Hong Isaac	3:44
2.	"Lean"	Hemian	Yoo Jeong-hyun	Solar	2:36
3.	"Forever" (Acoustic Ver.)	4bout	4bout; Kime; Echez	Kim Daniel	4:08
4.	"Dawn"	Croq; Jade; Spacecowboy	Spacecowboy; Jade; Croq	Kim A-reum	4:10
Total length:					14:38

== See also ==
- Unit 731
- Keijō
- List of Netflix original programming: Korean
