= Shin's Project =

2025 South Korean television series

- Promotional poster
- Hangul: 신사장 프로젝트
- Lit.: CEO Shin's Project
- RR: Sinsajang peurojekteu
- MR: Sinsajang p'ŭrojekt'ŭ
- Genre: Black comedy
- Written by: Ban Ki-ri
- Directed by: Shin Kyung-soo
- Starring: Han Suk-kyu; Bae Hyun-sung; Lee Re
- Music by: Movie Closer
- Country of origin: South Korea
- Original language: Korean
- No. of episodes: 12

Production
- Running time: 60 minutes
- Production companies: Studio Dragon; Doframe; Studio Anseillen

Original release
- Network: tvN
- Release: September 15 – October 28, 2025

Shin's Project (Korean: 신사장 프로젝트) is a 2025 South Korean television series. It is directed by Shin Kyung-soo and written by Ban Ki-ri, and starring Han Suk-kyu, Bae Hyun-sung, and Lee Re. It aired on tvN from September 15, to October 28, 2025, every Monday and Tuesday at 20:50 (KST).

The series is also available for streaming on Viu in selected regions.

== Synopsis ==
A comedy drama about a negotiation expert, Mr. Shin, who intervenes as a mediator to resolve disputes and problems between people.

== Cast ==
=== Main ===
- Han Suk-kyu as Mr. Shin

A former top-class negotiator who now runs a fried chicken restaurant and uses his mysterious skills to navigate tricky situations.

- Bae Hyun-sung as Jo Philip

A rookie judge who is suddenly assigned to work at the restaurant under mysterious circumstances.

- Lee Re as Lee Si-on

A bold and energetic delivery rider who assists in running the fried chicken business.

- Kim Sung-oh as Choi Cheol

A hot-tempered detective haunted by a 15-year-old hostage tragedy.

- Woo Mi-hwa as Madam Joo

The owner of an exclusive club who owes her daughter's life to Shin after the hostage tragedy.

- Kim Sang-ho as Kim Sang-geun

A seasoned civil court judge who values mediation over litigation.

- Jung Eun-pyo as Kim Soo-dong

A veteran civil servant with hacker-level sleuthing skills.

=== Supporting ===
==== People at the shopping plaza ====
- Woo Hyun as Kwon Chil-bong

Laundry shop owner.

- Jo Hyun-sik as Jang Tong-woo

Chinese restaurant owner.

- Lee Ji-ha as Lee Joo-in

Supermarket owner.

==== Others ====
- Lee Ah-rin as Lee Ye-on
- Lee Ji-won as Kang Yeo-kyung
- Bae Yoon-gyu as Mr. Bae
- Jeon Kook-hwan as Park Myung-jin
- Choi Hee-jin as Jeong Ji-in

=== Special appearances ===
- Lee Joong-ok as Upset tenant
- Um Hyo-sup as Philip's father
- Hwang Young-hee as Philip's mother
- Choi Won-young as Kim Young-ho
- Yoon Na-moo as Park Sang-jin
- Lee Yong-yi as Merchant
- Ha Jun as Gi-beom
- Choi Deok-moon as Jang Young-soo

== Production ==
The series is directed by Shin Kyung-soo, who worked on Six Flying Dragons (2015), Oh, the Mysterious (2017), Nokdu Flower (2019), and The First Responders, and written by Ban Ki-ri, who wrote Missing: The Other Side. It is planned by Studio Dragon and produced by doFRAME and Shin's own production banner Studio Anseillen.

== Viewership ==
Shin's Project : South Korea viewers per episode (millions)

Season	Episode number												Average
Season	1	2	3	4	5	6	7	8	9	10	11	12	Average
1	1.308	1.635	1.797	1.660	2.013	1.705	1.267	1.793	1.894	1.817	2.009	1.905	1.734

Source: Audience measurement performed nationwide by Nielsen Korea.

Average TV viewership ratings
Ep.	Original broadcast date	Average audience share	
Ep.	Original broadcast date	(Nielsen Korea)	
Ep.	Original broadcast date	Nationwide	Seoul
1	September 15, 2025	5.924% (1st)	6.456% (1st)
2	September 16, 2025	7.400% (1st)	7.788% (1st)
3	September 22, 2025	8.003% (1st)	7.992% (1st)
4	September 23, 2025	7.697% (1st)	7.434% (1st)
5	September 29, 2025	8.742% (1st)	8.027% (1st)
6	September 30, 2025	7.470% (1st)	7.103% (1st)
7	October 6, 2025	5.507% (1st)	5.428% (1st)
8	October 7, 2025	7.214% (1st)	6.669% (1st)
9	October 20, 2025	8.405% (1st)	8.220% (1st)
10	October 21, 2025	8.087% (1st)	7.150% (1st)
11	October 27, 2025	9.123% (1st)	8.816% (1st)
12	October 28, 2025	8.603% (1st)	8.043% (1st)
Average		7.681%	7.427%
In the table above, the blue numbers represent the lowest ratings and the red numbers represent the highest ratings.; This drama airs on a cable channel/pay TV which normally has a relatively smaller audience compared to free-to-air TV/public broadcasters (KBS, SBS, MBC, and EBS).
