= Gaus Electronics =

2022 South Korean television series

- Promotional poster
- Hangul: 가우스전자
- RR: Gauseu jeonja
- MR: Kausŭ chŏnja
- Genre: Workplace; Comedy
- Created by: Seo Su-min
- Based on: Gaus Electronics by Kwak Baek-soo
- Written by: Kang Go-eun; Seo Han-na
- Directed by: Park Joon-soo
- Starring: Kwak Dong-yeon; Ko Sung-hee; Bae Hyun-sung; Kang Min-ah
- Music by: Seo Seong-won; Lee Jong-soo
- Country of origin: South Korea
- Original language: Korean
- No. of episodes: 12

Production
- Executive producer: Park Min-seol
- Producers: Han Ah-reum; Ryu Jeong-min
- Editor: Lee Young-rim
- Running time: 45 minutes
- Production companies: Pan Entertainment; Ling-aling
- Budget: ₩6.5 billion

Original release
- Network: ENA
- Release: September 30 – November 5, 2022

Gaus Electronics (Korean: 가우스전자) is a 2022 South Korean television series starring Kwak Dong-yeon, Ko Sung-hee, Bae Hyun-sung and Kang Min-ah. It is based on a webtoon of the same name by writer Kwak Baek-soo, which was released on Naver. The series is an original drama of Olleh TV, and is available for streaming on its platform and on OTT media service Seezn. It also aired on ENA from September 30 to November 5, 2022, every Friday and Saturday at 21:00 (KST).

== Synopsis ==
The series is about the office workers of Marketing Team 3 at the home appliance headquarters of Gaus Electronics—a multinational company. It highlights the highs and lows of corporate life, and love and friendship between the employees.

== Cast ==
=== Main ===
- Kwak Dong-yeon as Lee Sang-sik
- Ko Sung-hee as Cha Na-rae
- Bae Hyun-sung as Baek Ma-tan
- Kang Min-ah as Geon Kang-mi

=== Supporting ===
- Baek Hyun-jin as Ki Sung-nam
- Heo Jung-do as Wi Jang-byung
- Jeon Seok-chan as Cha Wa-wa
- Go Woo-ri as Sung Hyeong-mi
- Baek Soo-jang as Kim Moon-hak
- Jo Jung-chi as Na Mu-myeong

=== Extended ===
- Kim Ji-sung as Choi Dal-soon
- Choi Ban-ya as Ma-tan's mother
- Lee So-hee as Mo Hae-young

=== Special appearances ===
- Yoon Park as Manager Bae Soo-jin
- WJSN Chocome as themselves

== Original soundtrack ==
=== Part 1 ===
Released on October 1, 2022
No.	Title	Lyrics	Music	Artist	Length
1.	"Diamond" (눈이 부신다)	Jeon Jun-gyu; Zeenan	Jeon Jun-gyu; Zeenan; Upvote Entertainment	Lucy	3:16
2.	"Diamond" (눈이 부신다; Inst.)		Jeon Jun-gyu; Zeenan; Upvote Entertainment		3:16
Total length:					6:32

=== Part 2 ===
Released on October 7, 2022
No.	Title	Lyrics	Music	Artist	Length
1.	"Because I Love You"	Jeon Jun-gyu; Zeenan	Jeon Jun-gyu; Zeenan; Upvote Entertainment	Kim Jong-wan (Nell)	3:56
2.	"Because I Love You" (Inst.)		Jeon Jun-gyu; Zeenan; Upvote Entertainment		3:56
Total length:					7:12

=== Part 3 ===
Released on October 16, 2022
No.	Title	Lyrics	Music	Artist	Length
1.	"Began" (비개인)	Jeon Jun-gyu; Zeenan	Jeon Jun-gyu; Upvote Entertainment	Hyolyn	3:08
2.	"Began" (비개인; Inst.)		Jeon Jun-gyu; Upvote Entertainment		3:08
Total length:					6:16

=== Part 4 ===
Released on October 21, 2022
No.	Title	Lyrics	Music	Artist	Length
1.	"We Are Young"	Jeon Jun-gyu; Zeenan	Jeon Jun-gyu; Zeenan; Upvote Entertainment	Zeenan	3:30
2.	"We Are Young" (Inst.)		Jeon Jun-gyu; Zeenan; Upvote Entertainment		3:30
Total length:					7:00

=== Part 5 ===
Released on October 29, 2022
No.	Title	Lyrics	Music	Artist	Length
1.	"Bad Girl"	Hwang Moon-seop	Hakan Mavruk; A-Dee; Alex Charles Sugarman	Apoki	3:09
Total length:					3:09

== Ratings ==
Average TV viewership ratings (nationwide)
Ep.	Original broadcast date	Average audience share (Nielsen Korea)
1	September 30, 2022	0.433% (65th)
2	October 1, 2022	0.496% (87th)
3	October 7, 2022	0.609% (45th)
4	October 8, 2022	0.336% (126th)
5	October 14, 2022	0.635% (39th)
6	October 15, 2022	0.548% (63rd)
7	October 21, 2022	0.869% (24th)
8	October 22, 2022	0.473% (75th)
9	October 28, 2022	0.65% (45th)
10	October 29, 2022	0.57% (64th)
11	November 4, 2022	0.488% (68th)
12	November 5, 2022	0.455% (99th)
In the table above, the blue numbers represent the lowest ratings and the red numbers represent the highest ratings.; This series aired on a cable channel/pay TV which normally has a relatively smaller audience compared to free-to-air TV/public broadcasters (KBS, SBS, MBC and EBS).
