= Family by Choice =

2024 South Korean television series

- Promotional poster
- Hangul: 조립식 가족
- Hanja: 組立式 家族
- Lit.: A Prefabricated Family
- RR: Joripsik gajok
- MR: Choripsik kajok
- Genre: Romantic comedy; Coming-of-age; Family drama
- Based on: Go Ahead by Shui Qianmo and Wang Xiongcheng
- Written by: Hong Si-young
- Directed by: Kim Seung-ho
- Starring: Hwang In-youp; Jung Chae-yeon; Bae Hyun-sung; Choi Won-young; Choi Moo-sung
- Music by: Park Sung-il
- Country of origin: South Korea
- Original language: Korean
- No. of episodes: 16

Production
- Running time: 60–70 minutes
- Production companies: SLL; HighZium Studio; Base Story

Original release
- Network: JTBC
- Release: October 9 – November 27, 2024

Related
- Go Ahead (Chinese original, 2020); Cha tôi, người ở lại (Vietnamese, 2025)

Family by Choice (Korean: 조립식 가족) is a 2024 South Korean television series. The series is written by Hong Si-young, directed by Kim Seung-ho, and starring Hwang In-youp, Jung Chae-yeon, Bae Hyun-sung, Choi Won-young, and Choi Moo-sung. It aired on JTBC from October 9 to November 27, 2024, every Wednesday at 20:50 (KST). It is also available for streaming on TVING and Netflix in South Korea, on U-Next in Japan, and on Viu and Viki in selected regions.

== Synopsis ==
Kim San-ha, Yoon Ju-won, and Kang Hae-jun are three individuals who are unrelated by blood but forge an unbreakable bond during their teenage years. Raised under the devoted care of Ju-won's father, Yoon Jeong-jae, who owns a Kalguksu restaurant, and San-ha's father, Kim Dae-wook, they grow up together as family. Despite the absence of their mothers, the two fathers create a nurturing and joyful environment for the trio. However, circumstances pull San-ha and Hae-jun away from their close-knit family, forcing them to part ways. A decade later, the three reunite, uncovering long-buried memories and rekindling the profound connections that shaped their lives.

== Cast ==
=== Main ===
- Hwang In-youp as Kim San-ha
  - Shin Seo-woo as young San-ha

He is the most popular boy at school, along with Kang Hae-jun. He may come off as cold and sometimes unintentionally says hurtful things, but deep down, he's warm-hearted and always looks out for his "siblings." Secretly, he has feelings for Ju-won.

- Jung Chae-yeon as Yoon Ju-won
  - Seo Eun-sol as teen Ju-won
  - Oh Eun-seo as young Ju-won

She is the heart of her family, radiating positive energy and joy to everyone around her. Her family feels happiest when she is happy, and her cheerful spirit is the glue that binds them together.

- Bae Hyun-sung as Kang Hae-jun
  - Choi Jae-yoon as young Hae-jun

He has a personality as clear and bright as sunlight and is the most popular guy at school, alongside Kim San-ha. Goofy yet grounded, he brings a sense of lightness to those around him while maintaining a quiet sense of responsibility. Grateful for the sacrifices made by Ju-won's father, he strives to work hard to become someone capable of repaying that kindness, hoping to alleviate some of Jeong-jae's burdens.

- Choi Won-young as Yoon Jeong-jae

Ju-won's father. He owns a small noodle restaurant (Kalguksu) and always seems to understand the kids' feelings without them saying a word. He works hard to ensure they have everything they need and especially cares for Hae-jun like his own son.

- Choi Moo-sung as Kim Dae-wook

San-ha's father. He's a gentle but serious police officer. He's always bright around the children and Jeong-jae. Even though he finds it hard to comfort his son directly, his love shows in how he provides for him.

=== Supporting ===
==== People around San-ha ====
- Kim Hye-eun as Kwon Jeong-hee

San-ha's mother. She hates her son due to an unexpected misfortune.

- Yang Hyun-seo as Jung So-hee
  - Kim Min-chae as young Jung So-hee

San-ha's half-sister and Jeong-hee's daughter.

==== People around Hae-jun ====
- Baek Eun-hye as Kang Seo-hyun

Hae-jun's mother. She raises her son and gives him her last name in place of his irresponsible father, who left them both.

- Min Ji-ah as Kang Yi-hyeon

Hae-jun's aunt and Seo-hyun's younger sister.

==== Friends from Haedong High School ====
- Seo Ji-hye as Park Dal

Ju-won's best friend, who becomes a lawyer, has lived her entire life according to her mother's expectations. While she endures each day suffocatingly, she falls in love with Hae-jun.

- Yoon Sang-hyeon as Lee Jun-ho

He had a crush on Ju-won in high school but was completely rejected. He becomes an intern at Myeongju University Hospital.

- Yoon Woo as Yoon Seok-hoon

Hae-jun's best friend, who becomes a physical education teacher, is the only person he can share secrets with. He is Jae-eun's husband.

- Ha Seo-yoon as Do Hee-joo

Hae-jun's ex-girlfriend, who is a resident at Myeongju University Hospital.

- Baek Ye-in as Kang Jae-eun

Ju-won and Dal's classmate, who has a quirky and lively charm. She is Seok-hoon's wife.

==== People of Haedong ====
- Seong Byung-sook as Madam

The village representative, who knows how many soy sauce rolls are in each house in the neighborhood and is careless with recycling. She wanders around, meddling in everything, but deep down, she genuinely cares about the villagers' well-being.

- Choi Chan-ho as Inspector Kim

Dae-wook's subordinate at the police station.

==== Extended ====
- Kim Do-yeon as Bully's mom

== Production ==
=== Development ===
The series was written by Hong Si-young, directed by Kim Seung-ho, and produced by Hi-Zium Studio, Base Story, and SLL. It is based on the Chinese drama Go Ahead.

=== Casting ===
On December 13, 2023, JTBC announced that Hwang In-youp, Jung Chae-yeon, and Bae Hyun-sung have confirmed their appearances for the series.

=== Filming ===
The production team of Family by Choice, which finished all filming and entered post-production on July 14, 2024.

== Release ==
Family by Choice was confirmed to broadcast on JTBC on October 9, 2024, and would be air every Wednesday at 20:50 (KST). It is also available to stream on Viu, U-Next, Viki, TVING.

== Viewership ==
Family by Choice : South Korea viewers per episode (thousands)

Season	Episode number															
Season	1	2	3	4	5	6	7	8	9	10	11	12	13	14	15	16
1	434	436	N/A	N/A	500	599	567	615	551	570	603	609	519	545	659	791

Source: Audience measurement performed nationwide by Nielsen Korea.

Average TV viewership ratings
Ep.	Original broadcast date	Average audience share (Nielsen Korea)	
Ep.	Original broadcast date	Nationwide	Seoul
1	October 9, 2024	2.079% (8th)	2.004% (6th)
2	October 9, 2024	2.242% (6th)	2.318% (4th)
3	October 16, 2024	2.017% (14th)	N/A
4	October 16, 2024	2.147% (12th)	2.020% (6th)
5	October 23, 2024	2.491% (8th)	2.295% (6th)
6	October 23, 2024	2.647% (5th)	2.333% (4th)
7	October 30, 2024	2.987% (6th)	3.049% (2nd)
8	October 30, 2024	3.363% (2nd)	3.431% (1st)
9	November 6, 2024	2.894% (6th)	2.597% (6th)
10	November 6, 2024	3.155% (3rd)	2.870% (3rd)
11	November 13, 2024	3.118% (6th)	3.131% (5th)
12	November 13, 2024	3.135% (5th)	3.284% (2nd)
13	November 20, 2024	2.878% (9th)	3.006% (5th)
14	November 20, 2024	2.892% (8th)	3.211% (3rd)
15	November 27, 2024	3.448% (4th)	3.752% (3rd)
16	November 27, 2024	3.672% (3rd)	3.865% (2nd)
Average		2.823%	— (Note: Due to an unpublished rating, the exact average rating is unknown.)
In the table above, the blue numbers represent the lowest ratings and the red numbers represent the highest ratings.; N/A denotes ratings that were not published.; This drama aired on a cable channel/pay TV which normally has a relatively smaller audience compared to free-to-air TV/public broadcasters (KBS, SBS, MBC, and EBS).

== Accolades ==
=== Listicles ===
Name of publisher, year listed, name of listicle, and placement
Publisher	Year	Listicle	Placement	Ref.
Teen Vogue	2024	13 Best K-Dramas of 2024	Included	
