= Kim Hye-eun =

South Korean actress (born 1973)

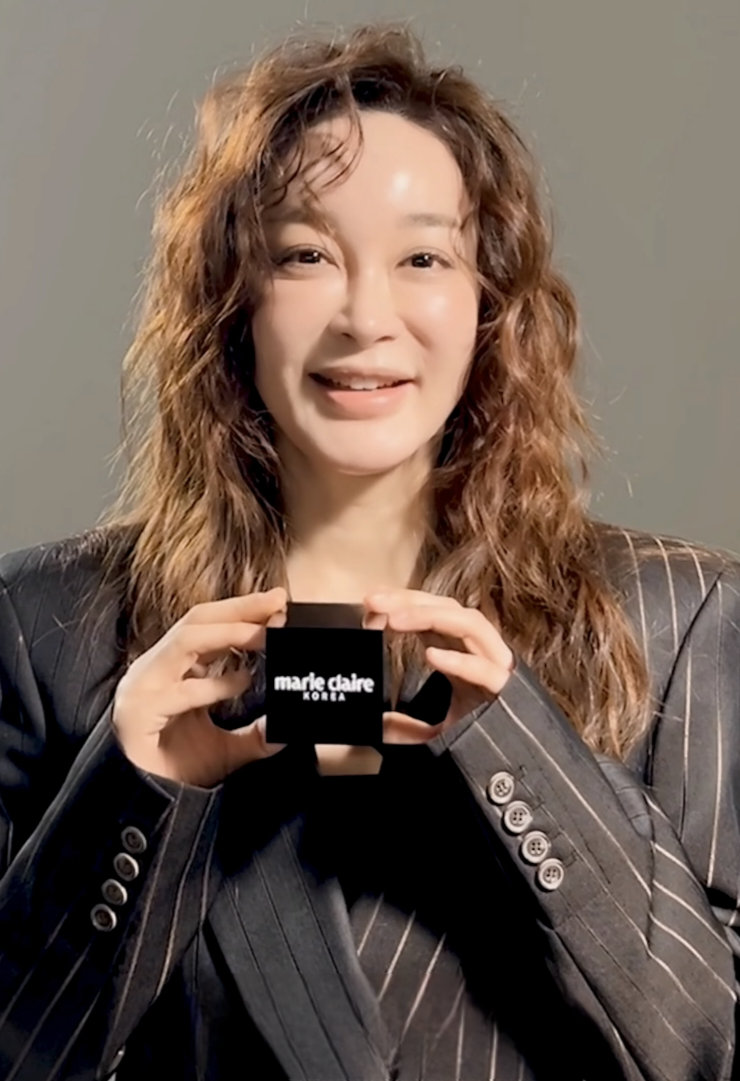
- Kim in February 2025
- Born: March 1, 1973 (age 53); Busan, South Korea
- Education: Seoul National University College of Music – Voice
- Occupation: Actress
- Years active: 1997–present
- Agent: FN Entertainment
- Spouse: Kim In-soo

Korean name
- Hangul: 김혜은
- Hanja: 金惠恩
- RR: Gim Hyeeun
- MR: Kim Hyeŭn

Kim Hye-eun (Korean: 김혜은; born March 1, 1973) is a South Korean actress. Kim began working as an announcer for the MBC network in 1997, first at a local affiliate in Cheongju, then later as a weathercaster of the main news desk in Seoul. After eight years, she resigned from MBC in 2004. Kim pursued acting in earnest in 2007, and has since starred in films and television series, notably Nameless Gangster: Rules of the Time (2012), Secret Love Affair (2014), and Encounter (2018–19), and Family by Choice (2024).

== Personal life ==
Kim is the cousin of writer Min Jin Lee, who wrote the book Pachinko.

== Filmography ==
=== Film ===
Year	Title	Role
1998	Scent of a Man	Beautician
2005	Heaven's Soldiers	Female announcer
2012	Nameless Gangster: Rules of the Time	Miss Yeo
2014	Man in Love	Mi-young
2016	Pandora	First Lady
2017	Yes, Family	Soon-im
2017	The Mayor	Seoul debate moderator
2017	The Sheriff in Town	Mi-sun
2020	Okay! Madam	Flight attendant
2024	Revolver	Shaman
2025	Family Secret	Yeon-jeong

=== Television series ===
Year	Title	Role	Notes
2002	Nonstop 3	Weathercaster	
2004	The Woman Who Wants to Marry	Lee Shin-young's friend	
2007	Ahyeon-dong Madam	Shin Sook-young	
2007	New Heart	Wife of Kim Tae-joon's professor	
2008	Women in the Sun	Jang Shi-eun	
2008	Wife and Woman	Kim Jae-ran	
2010	Kim Su-ro, The Iron King	Na Chal-nyeo	
2010	Coffee House	Seo Eun-young's friend	
2010	KBS Drama Special: "Last Flashman"	Rural school teacher	
2011	You're So Pretty	Go Yoo-jung	
2012	Man from the Equator	Park Yoon-joo	
2012	I Do, I Do	Bong Joon-hee	
2012	Lovers of Haeundae	Yook Tam-hee/Yook Bok-ja	
2013	Princess Aurora	Hwang Ja-mong	
2013	Golden Rainbow	Yang Se-ryun	
2014	Secret Affair	Seo Young-woo	
2014	Triangle	Kim Ok-kyung	
2014	My Lovely Girl	Oh Hee-seon	
2015	The Jingbirok: A Memoir of Imjin War	Kim In-bin	
2015	Unkind Ladies	Ahn Jong-mi	
2015	D-Day	Kang Joo-ran	
2016	Monster	Hwang Ji-soo	
2016–2020	Dr. Romantic	Shin Hyun-jung	Season 1; Cameo (Ep 14–18) Season 2; Cameo (Ep 16)
2017	Introverted Boss	Hwan-ki's psychotherapist	
2017	Live Up to Your Name	Ha-ra's mother	
2018	Radio Romance	Ra Ra-hee	
2018	Are You Human?	Nam Ho-yeon	
2018	Mr. Sunshine	Kim Hee-sung's mother	Cameo
2018	The Guest	Park Hong-joo	
2018	Clean with Passion for Now	Cha Mae-hwa	
2018	Encounter	Kim Sun-joo	
2019	Doctor John	Min Tae-kyeong	
2020	Itaewon Class	Kang Min-jeong	
2020	Graceful Friends	Kang Kyung-ja	
2020	Soul Mechanic	Patient	Cameo
2021	The Road: The Tragedy of One	Cha Seo-yeong	
2022	Twenty-Five Twenty-One	Yang Chan-mi	
2022	The Sound of Magic	Na Il-deung's mother	
2022	May It Please the Court	Oh Ha-ran	
2023	My Perfect Stranger	Mi-suk (in 2021)	
2023	Not Others	Mi-jeong	
2024	Iron Family	Baek Ji-yeon	
2024	Family by Choice	Kwon Jeong-hee	
2026	Flex X Cop	Jung Tae-sun	Season 2; special appearance
TBA	Knock-Off	Jang Ji-soo	

=== Variety shows ===
Year	Title	Notes
2006	우리 말 우리 글	Host
2006	Culture and Art 36.5	Host
2007	Living IQ	Host

== Awards and nominations ==
Year	Award	Category	Nominated work	Result
2012	48th Baeksang Arts Awards	Best New Actress	Nameless Gangster: Rules of the Time	Nominated
2012	21st Buil Film Awards	Best New Actress	Nameless Gangster: Rules of the Time	Nominated
2012	5th Korea Drama Awards	Excellence Award, Actress	Man from the Equator	Nominated
2014	3rd APAN Star Awards	Best Supporting Actress	Secret Love Affair	Won
2014	SBS Drama Awards	Special Award, Actress in a Miniseries	My Lovely Girl	Nominated
