= Cho Hae-jin =

South Korean writer (born 1976)

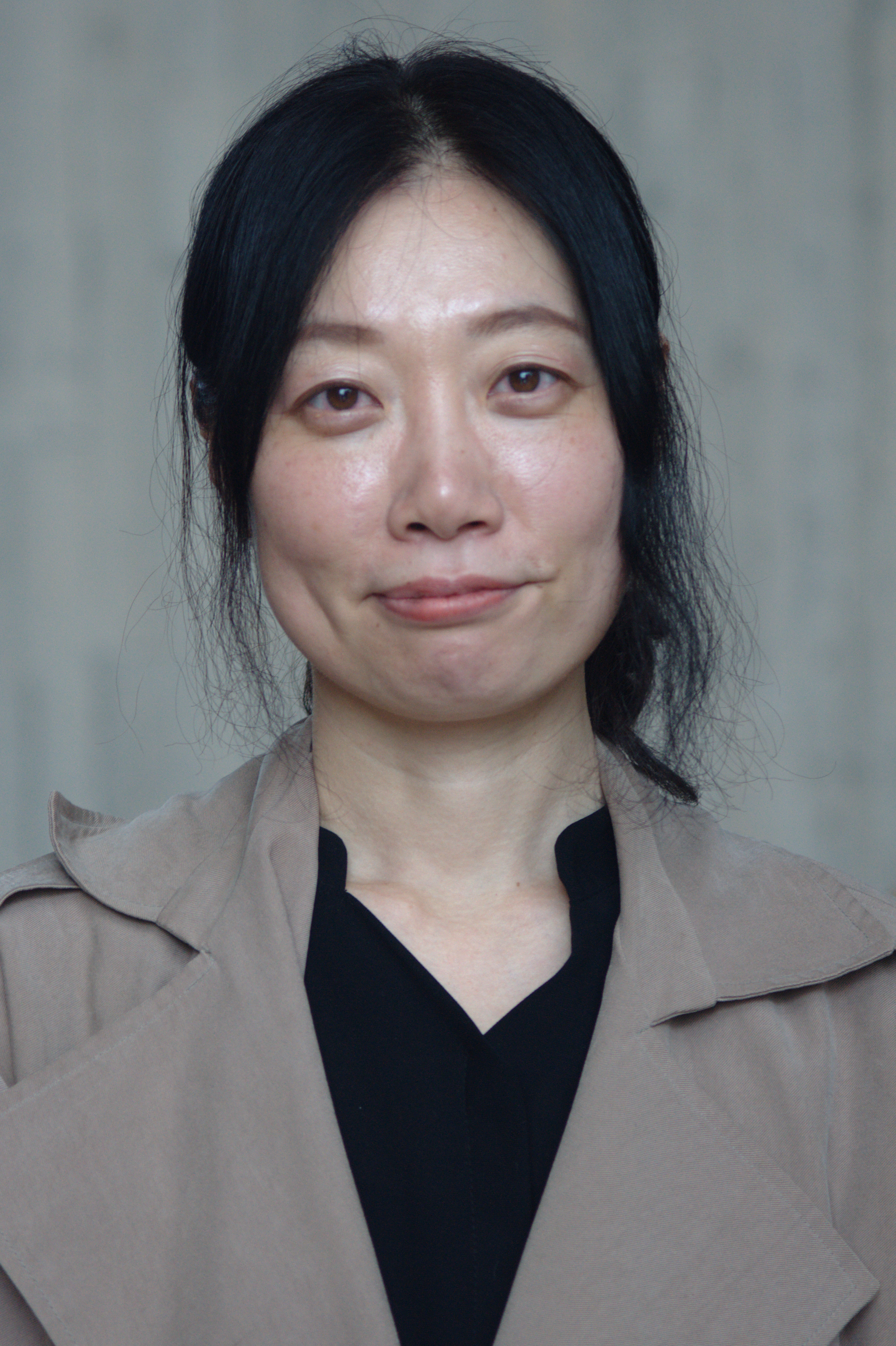
Cho Haejin at Scener & samtal 2019.

Cho Hae-jin (Korean: 조해진; Hanja: 趙海珍, born 1976) is a South Korean writer.

== Life ==
Cho Hae-jin was born in 1976 in Seoul, and graduated from the Ewha Womans University in education, and then graduated from the same university's graduate school in Korean literature. She began her literary career in 2004 when she won the Munye Joongang Literary Award for Best First Novel.

In late 2008, she taught students in Korean studies at a university in Poland, working as a Korean language teacher for about a year. At this time she read an article about North Korean defectors in Belgium, and this led to the publication of her second novel I Met Lo Kiwan (로기완을 만났다).

In 2013, I Met Lo Kiwan (로기완을 만났다) won the 31st Sin Dong-yup Prize for Literature, and in 2016 she won the 17th Lee Hyo-seok Literary Award for short story "Sanchaekja-ui haengbok" (산책자의 행복 Happiness of a Walker).

== Writing ==
Literary critic Shin Hyeongcheol wrote in the commentary for Cho Hae-jin's first novel that "this author writes only about those that are physically dying, or are already dead socially." Also, literary critic Go Inhwan has stated of Cho's novels that they "start from the interest on the lives of others, and then through the painful process of seeping into their lives, they allow the readers to become infused in their inner selves with the lives of others", and that they have "blindingly clear patterns of communication that are engraved in the inner sides of readers."

Cho has clearly stated her opinion on literature, saying "fundamentally, literature, and also literature's identity, is like this. Dealing with the nameless people, and the problem of status and ethics, I believe, is not only literature's nature, but a common topic for all writers. Because those that don’t lack anything I'm sure the other media will remember on their own."

== Works ==
=== Short story collections ===
- Bitui howi (빛의 호위 The Guard of Light), Changbi, 2017. ISBN 9788936437459.
- Mokyo-il-e mannayo (목요일에 만나요 Let's Meet On Thursday), Munhakdongne, 2014. ISBN 9788954624169.
- City of Angels (천사들의 도시), Minumsa, 2008. ISBN 9788937482014.

=== Novels ===
- Yeoreumeul jinagada (여름을 지나가다 Passing Summer), Munye Joongang, 2015. ISBN 9788927806738.
- A Forest That No One Has Seen (아무도 보지 못한 숲), Minumsa, 2013. ISBN 9788937473012.
- I Met Lo Kiwan (로기완을 만났다), Changbi, 2011. ISBN 9788936433857.
- Haneopsi meotjin kkum-e (한없이 멋진 꿈에 On an Endlessly Wonderful Dream), Munhakdongne, 2009. ISBN 9788954608541.

=== Works in translation ===
- Я встретила Ро Кивана (I met Lo Kiwan) (Russian)

== Awards ==
- 2016 "Sanchaekja-ui haengbok" (산책자의 행복 Happiness of a Walker) Lee Hyo-seok Literary Award.
- 2014 Bitui howi (빛의 호위 The Guard of Light) 5th Young Writers' Award.
- 2013, I Met Lo Kiwan (로기완을 만났다) 31st Sin Dong-yup Prize for Literature
- 2004, "Yeoja-ege gileul mutda" (여자에게 길을 묻다 Asking for Directions to a Woman), Munye Joongang New Writer's Award.
