= Hwang In-youp =

South Korean actor and model (born 1991)

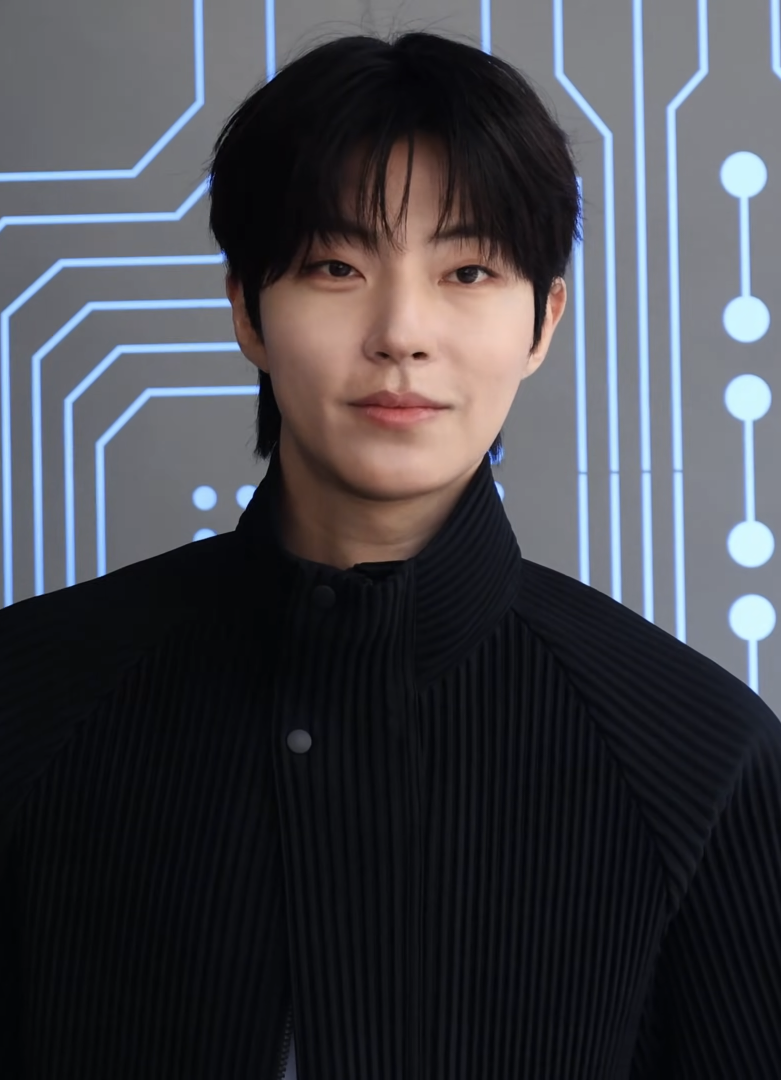
- Hwang in 2026
- Born: January 19, 1991 (age 35); Uijeongbu, South Korea
- Other name: Ryan Leon
- Education: Philippine Women's University (BFA)
- Occupations: Actor; model
- Years active: 2017–present
- Agents: KeyEast (Korea); Stream Media Corporation (Japan); KN Studio
- Height: 185 cm (6 ft 1 in)

Korean name
- Hangul: 황인엽
- Hanja: 黃寅燁
- RR: Hwang Inyeop
- MR: Hwang Inyŏp

Signature
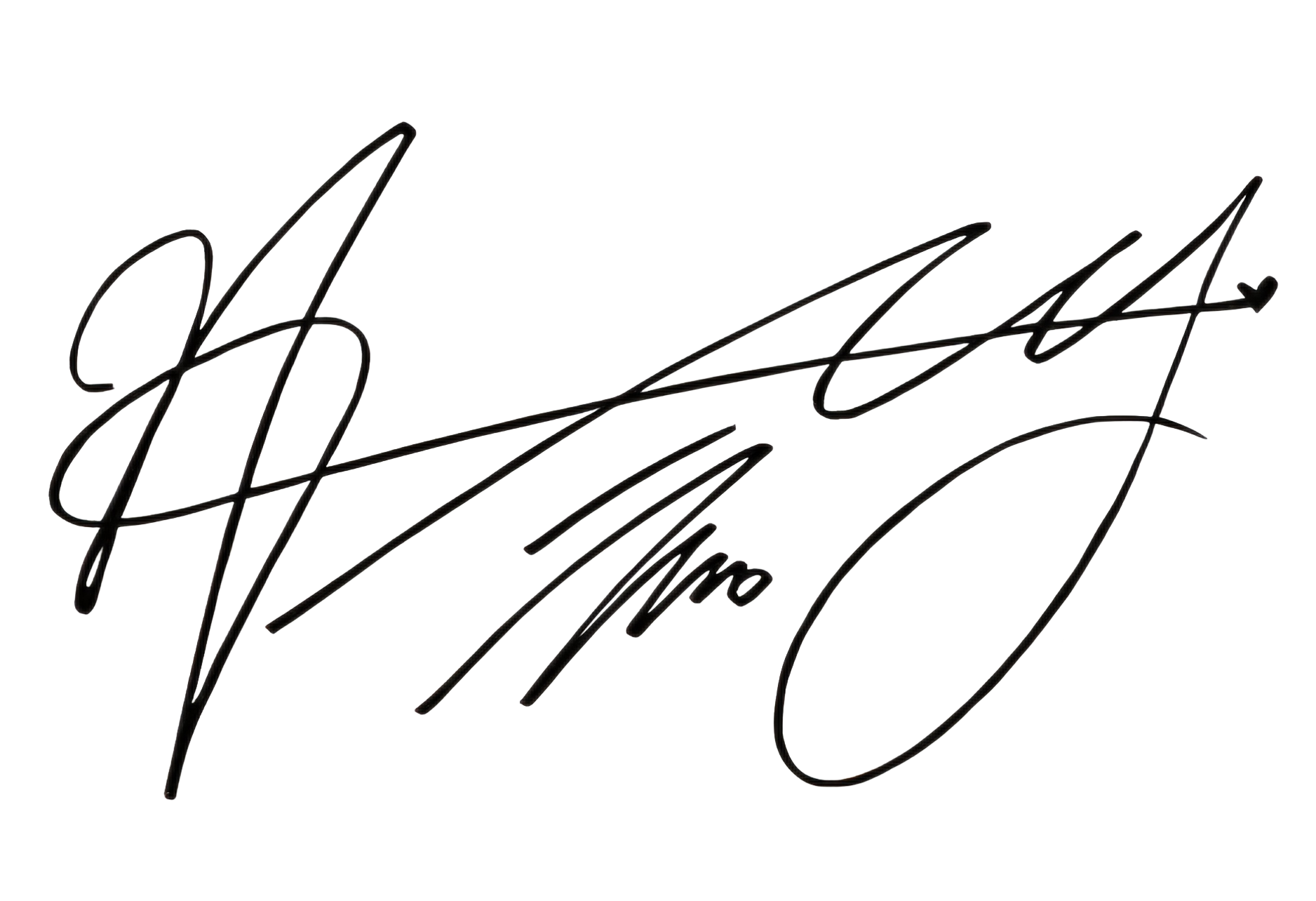

Hwang In-youp (Korean: 황인엽; born January 19, 1991) is a South Korean actor and model. He began his career in modeling industry before making his screen debut with a main role in the web series Why (2018). He is known for his roles in 18 Again (2020), True Beauty (2020–2021), the Netflix original series The Sound of Magic (2022), Why Her (2022), Family by Choice (2024), and Dream to You (2026).

== Early life and education ==
Hwang In-youp was born in Uijeongbu, Gyeonggi Province, South Korea, on January 19, 1991. He is the oldest son; his brother, who is three years younger, is a producer and singer-songwriter who goes by the name Inof. Hwang lived in Davao City, Philippines, during his high school and college years, going by the English name Ryan Leon. He graduated from high school at the Philippine Nikkei Jin Kai International School, and later graduated with a Bachelor of Fine Arts degree in fashion design at the Philippine Women's University (formerly Philippine Women's College).

== Career ==
=== 2017–2019: Modelling and acting debut ===
Hwang entered the entertainment industry in 2017 as a runway model. Reports state that he was once under YG KPlus, a model management company owned by YG Entertainment.

In 2018, he made his acting debut in the Naver TV web series Why. He later signed a contract with the South Korean agency KeyEast, a subsidiary of SM Entertainment.

In 2019, he played Seo Kyo-won in the web series Freshman, and made his television debut with supporting role in the KBS2 historical television series The Tale of Nokdu.

=== 2020–present: Rising popularity ===
In 2020, Hwang gained recognition for his performance in the JTBC fantasy series 18 Again, a remake of the 2009 American film 17 Again. He played Goo Ja-sung, a school bully and the counterpart character of Stan, who was portrayed by Hunter Parrish in the original film.

Hwang participed in the 2020 drama tvN romantic-comedy series True Beauty, based on the on-going Webtoon of the same name. He portrayed Han Seo-jun, a secondary lead character. He contributed to the soundtrack of the series with the song "It Starts Today" (오늘부터 시작인걸).

Hwang also appeared in the independent short film Swimming Bird alongside Lee Ji-ah, which the film won at the 1st GwangMyeong Film Festival.

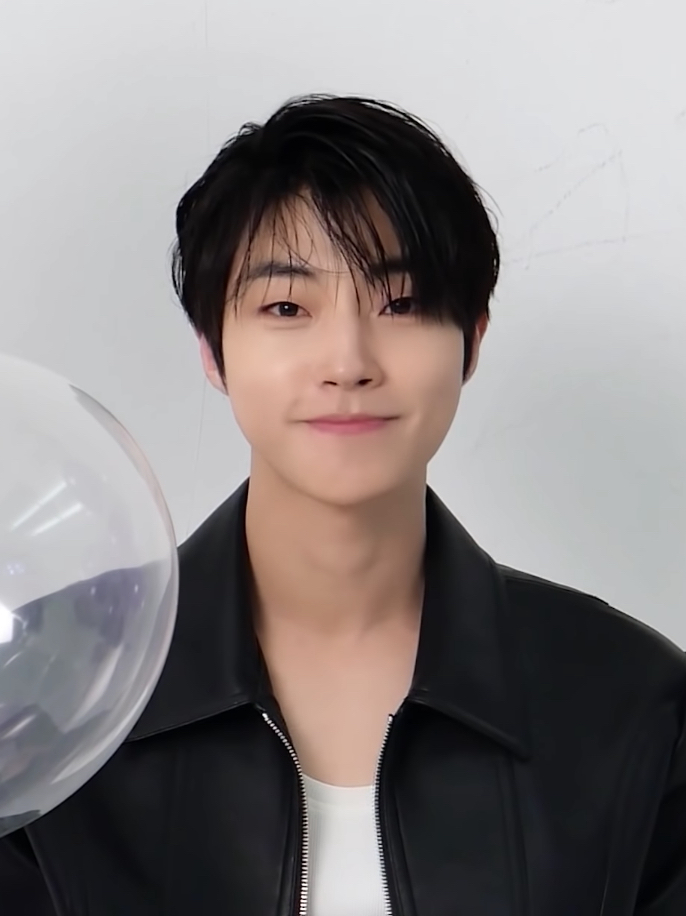
Hwang in 2021

In 2021, Hwang was cast in the fantasy musical series The Sound of Magic, which was released globally on Netflix in May 2022. He is also contributed to the soundtrack of the series with the song "I Mean It" (진지해 지금). On April 23, 2021, Keyeast announced that Hwang had signed a contract with Japan's agency Stream Media Corporation. Later, Hwang confirmed to star in the SBS mystery legal drama Why Her which premiered in June 2022 marking his first lead role on a terrestrial TV station.

In 2023, he was cast as Kim San-ha, one of the main characters in drama Family by Choice, Korean remake of Chinese drama Go Ahead in 2023. Drama was aired in 2024 at JTBC channel and OTT platforms.

On January 2, 2024, it was reported that Hwang had signed an exclusive contract with KN Studio.

In August 2024, JTBC confirmed Hwang as a special appearance character Heo In-gang to star in Dear X drama.

On November 24, 2025, Japanese agency J Harmony posted that it took over the operation of his Japan official X account.

== Personal life ==
Hwang had completed mandatory military service before beginning a career in modelling.

He has training in various martial arts such as Taekwondo (where he is a 3rd dan black belt), Hapkido and Kendo (or Kumdo as it is known in South Korea).

== Discography ==
=== Soundtrack appearances ===
Title	Year	Album	Ref.
"It Starts Today" (오늘부터 시작인걸)	2021	True Beauty OST	
"I Mean It" (진지해 지금)	2022	The Sound of Magic OST	

== Filmography ==
=== Film ===
Year	Title	Role	Notes	Ref.
2020	Swimming Bird	In-guk	Short film	

=== Television series ===
Year	Title	Role	Notes	Ref.
2019	The Tale of Nokdu	Park Dan-ho		
2020	18 Again	Goo Ja-sung		
2020–2021	True Beauty	Han Seo-jun		
2022	The Sound of Magic	Na Il-Deung		
2022	Why Her	Gong Chan / Kim Dong-gu		
2024	Family by Choice	Kim San-ha		
2025	Dear X	Heo In-gang	Cameo (episode 5–8)	
2026	Dream to You	Woo Soo-bin		

=== Web series ===
Year	Title	Role	Ref.
2018	Why	Gi Jae-young	
2019	Freshman	Seo Kyo-won	

=== Web shows ===
Year	Title	Role	Notes	Ref.
2022	Young Actors' Retreat	Cast member	Premiered on TVING	
2025	Crime Scene Zero	Guest Player in Episode 5	Netflix	

== Awards and nominations ==
Name of the award ceremony, year presented, category, nominee of the award, and the result of the nomination
Award ceremony	Year	Category	Nominee / Work	Result	Ref.
Asian Culture Awards	2020	Best Korean Rising Star	True Beauty	Nominated	
Brand Customer Loyalty Award	2021	Best Male Rookie Actor	Hwang In-youp	Won	
SBS Drama Awards	2022	Excellence Award, Actor in a Miniseries Genre/Fantasy Drama	Why Her	Nominated	
SBS Drama Awards	2022	Best Supporting Team	Why Her	Nominated	
