= Go Ahead (TV series) =

2020 Chinese television series

- Genre: Family drama; Romance; Melodrama
- Screenplay by: Shui Qianmo (水阡墨); Wang Xiongcheng (王雄成)
- Directed by: Ding Ziguang (丁梓光)
- Starring: Tan Songyun; Song Weilong; Zhang Xincheng
- Country of origin: China
- Original language: Mandarin
- No. of episodes: 46 (40 in DVD version)

Production
- Producer: Long Ya (龙亚)
- Production locations: Xiamen, Fujian
- Production companies: Huace Pictures; Beijing Laoyou Film and Television Culture Film; Zhang Xincheng Film and Television Culture Studio; Beijing Xingyun Culture Communication Co., Ltd.

Original release
- Network: Hunan TV
- Release: August 10, 2020

Related
- Family by Choice (2024)

Go Ahead (Chinese: 以家人之名; pinyin: Yǐ Jiārén zhī Míng) is a 2020 Chinese television drama series, which revolves around three non blood-related kids who became each other's family. It premiered on Hunan TV on August 10, 2020. The series was a hit, and was well received by audiences for its warm familial theme. It aired on iQIYI globally with multi-language subtitles on October 8, 2020. In Vietnam, it aired on FPT Play on August 12, 2020 and on YouTube by Huace TV Vietnam on November 11, 2020. Netflix also gained the rights to air the series.

== Synopsis ==
Li Jianjian (Tan Songyun), Ling Xiao (Song Weilong), and He Ziqiu (Zhang Xincheng) are three individuals unrelated by blood that become each other's family. They bond over their shared family troubles and support each other through the ups and downs of life. The story follows them through childhood, high school, college, and eventually adulthood. As they grow up and rekindle relationships with their biological family, as well as experience hardships in life, the bond between the three becomes strained. But somehow, they always find their way back to each other.

== Cast ==
Cast	Role	Description
Tan Songyun	Li Jianjian (李尖尖)	Daughter of Li Haichao. Jianjian was known to be cheerful, stubborn, loyal, and honest. She enrolled in university to study wood carving. Jianjian later became one of the bosses of a woodcraft shop with her senior whom she met during university. She is roommates with Mingyue and Tang Can.
Song Weilong	Ling Xiao (凌霄)	Son of Ling Heping. He grew up with Jianjian and Ziqiu and left for Singapore when he was 18 years old. He was obliged to take care of his mom and younger sister after his mom and stepdad were in a car accident, which resulted in his stepdad's death and his mom's paralysis of her legs. He is a dentist.
Zhang Xincheng	He Ziqiu (贺子秋)	Foster son of Li Haichao's. He is a very loyal person and is always there for support. He leaves to attend university abroad in the United Kingdom. He becomes a pastry chef and opens a restaurant near his old high school.

=== Other Cast ===
Cast	Role	Description
Tu Songyan	Li Haichao (李海潮)	Father of Li Jianjian. He owns a noodle restaurant across from his home. He loves children but his wife dies due to complications with her second pregnancy. He fosters Ziqiu.
Zhang Xilin	Ling Heping (凌和平)	Father of Ling Xiao. Ex-husband of Chen Ting. He is a police officer with constant work demands. He is the godfather of Jianjian and Ziqiu. After his divorce, he becomes close with Haichao and contributes both morally and financially to the household.
He Ruixian	Tang Can (唐灿)	She owns a Taobao store. Tang Can was popular in high school for being an actress. She becomes friends with Jianjian and Mingyue during high school after Ziqiu and Ling Xiao leave for university abroad. She later moves into an apartment with Jianjian and Mingyue.
Sun Yi	Qi Mingyue (齐明月)	She has an overwhelming/helicopter mother who doesn't listen to Mingyue's opinions or feelings. She likes journalism and works as a reporter (contract worker) at a TV station. She is roommates with Jianjian and Tang Can.
Yang Tongshu	Chen Ting	Ling Xiao's mother and Ling Heping's ex-wife. Abandons Ling Xiao, being in a conflicted mood, when he was just an 8-year-old kid and left for Singapore where she later remarried and gave birth to a daughter, Qui Changzi.
Yuan Ran	He Mei	She is Ziqiu's mother. She leaves Ziqiu to work in Shenzhen but doesn't take back Ziqiu, leaving him in the care of his maternal grandmother and aunt. Later, she moves back to their hometown and owns a beauty salon.
	Sun Huiying	Deceased. She was the wife of Li Haichao and mother of Li Jianjian. She died from pregnancy complications.

== Production ==
Filming began on September 16, 2019 and concluded on December 29, 2019 in Xiamen.

== Reception ==
The drama received mostly positive reviews. It ended with a rating of 6.9 on Douban. Among international viewers, particularly in Asia, the drama was a big hit and received generally positive reviews.

== Original soundtrack ==
Released on 2020
No.	Title	Lyrics	Music	Artist	Length
1.	"Fearless" (无畏)	Sa Ji	Jin Dazhou	Ma Di	2:59
2.	"I Will Stay Hot" (我会守在这里)	Sa Ji	Jin Dazhou	Mao Buyi	2:54
3.	"The Light Which Cannot Be Seen" (看不见的光)	Sa Ji	Cui Sezhi; Nan Juming	Zhao BuEr	3:16
4.	"Like a Breeze"	Sa Ji	Huang Yongzhou	Tan Songyun	3:07
5.	"Rain" (雨)	Sa Ji	Sun Qiu; Kim Dong Young	Shen Yicheng	3:35
6.	"If Rain" (萨吉)	Sa Ji	Sun Qiu; Kim Dong Young	Sa Ji	3:29
7.	"My Everything"	Sa Ji	Jin Tinghe; Song Yongen	Kim Jun Sik	3:46
Total length:					23:16

== International Broadcast ==
- Philippines - Aired by ABS-CBN via Kapamilya Channel, A2Z, TV5, ALLTV2, and streaming platform iWant from October 6, 2025 to February 6, 2026.

== Remake ==
- South Korea - This series is remade in South Korea as Family by Choice, aired on JTBC in 2024.
- Vietnam - This series is remade in Vietnam as Cha tôi, người ở lại, aired on government-owned VTV3 in 2025.
