= Heo Nam-jun =

South Korean actor (born 1993)

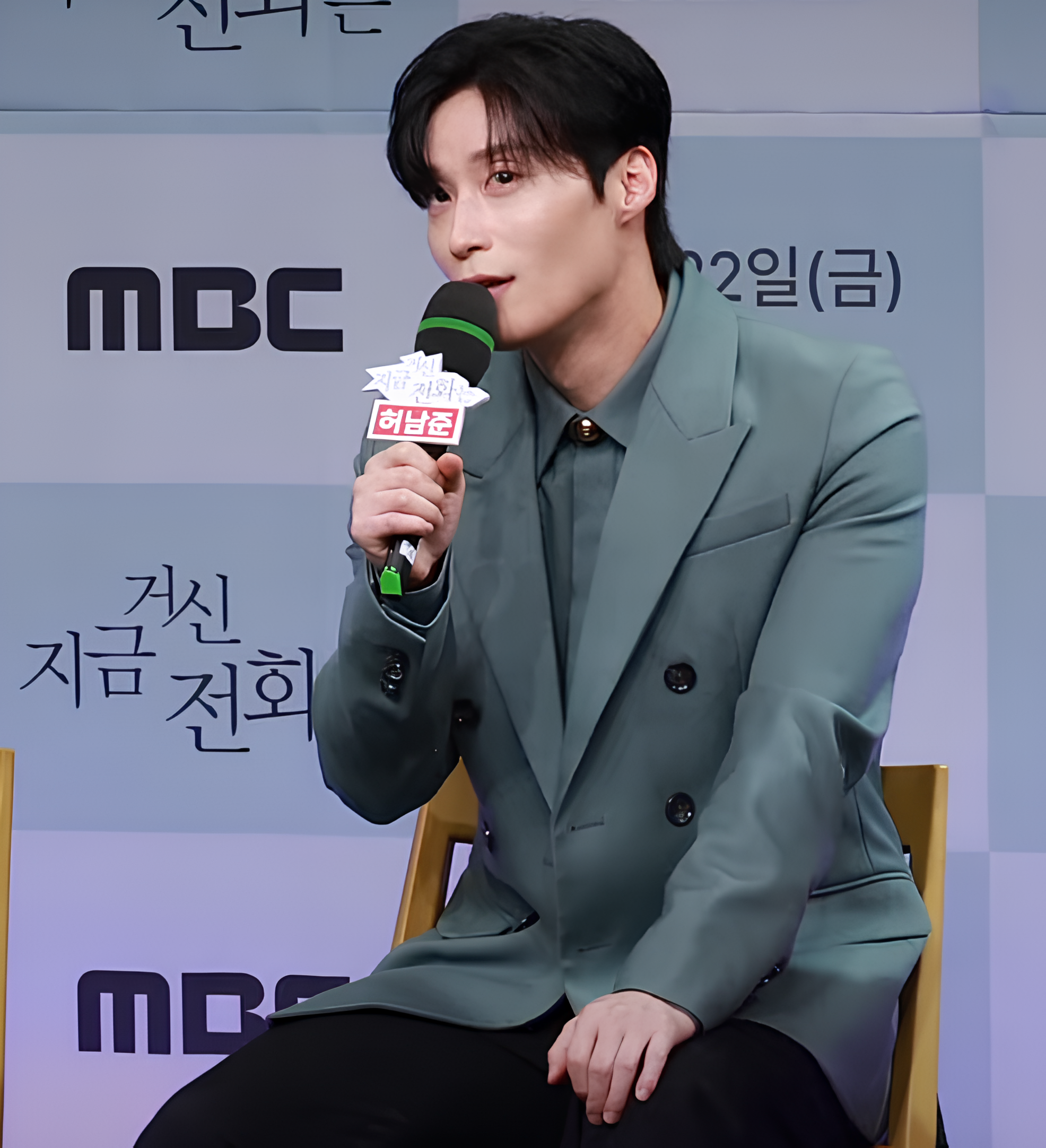
- Heo in November 2024
- Born: June 9, 1993 (age 33); South Korea
- Education: Sungkyunkwan University
- Occupation: Actor
- Years active: 2019–present
- Agent: H.Solid

Korean name
- Hangul: 허남준
- RR: Heo Namjun
- MR: Hŏ Namjun

Heo Nam-jun (Korean: 허남준; born June 9, 1993) is a South Korean actor. He is best known for his starring roles in My Royal Nemesis (2026) and A Hundred Memories (2025). He also starred as co-lead in When the Phone Rings (2024–2025) and had important supporting roles in When the Stars Gossip (2025), Your Honor (2024) and The Matchmakers (2023).

== Career ==
Prior to his debut, Heo studied in Sungkyunkwan University and completed a degree in acting.

Heo debuted in 2019 through the movie Like the First (2019). His first drama appearance was in OCN drama Missing: The Other Side (2020). Heo would go on to play supporting roles in dramas such as Snowdrop (2021); The Matchmakers (2023); Sweet Home Season 2 and 3 (2023–2024); and The Impossible Heir (2024), as well as movies like Night in Paradise (2020); Double Patty (2021); and I, the Executioner (2024). He was nominated for the Best New Actor Award by the 2024 APAN Star Awards for his performance in Sweet Home.

In 2024, Heo portrayed a cold-blooded gangster and murderer named Kim Sang-hyuk – the eldest son of Kim Myung-min's character Kim Kang-heon – in Your Honor, a role which garnered Heo increased public attention. During that same year, Heo portrayed Ji Sang-woo, a warm-hearted psychiatrist and YouTuber who specialized in unsolved cases in When the Phone Rings. The drama itself was a commercial success and received positive reviews. Heo was also awarded the Best New Actor Award from the 2024 MBC Drama Awards for his outstanding performance in the drama.

Heo was cast in tvN drama When the Stars Gossip (2025), which was first broadcast on January 4, 2025. Also in 2025, he plays the main role and the romantic interest in A Hundred Memories (2025) as Han Jae-pil, a university student and the handsome son of the president, nicknamed as "The Prince on a White Horse", due to his attractive looks and privileged background. This role marked a major milestone for Heo, allowing him to portray a romantic, multifaceted, and deeply melancholic character in a coming-of-age melodrama.

In the SBS TV romantic comedy, My Royal Nemesis (2026), Heo played his very first leading role as Cha Se-gye, a ruthless and powerful conglomerate CEO often dubbed a "monster of capitalism", whose orderly life gets completely upended when he crosses paths with Shin Seo-ri (played by Lim Ji-yeon), a struggling modern actress whose body has been possessed by the soul of a notorious, fierce Joseon-era royal villainess. The show was a massive breakout hit on Netflix, and his performance has been widely praised for reviving the nostalgic, high-stakes charm of classic 2010s K-drama male leads. In 2026, Heo also made a special appearance in the television series Perfect Crown.

Heo has been officially confirmed as part of the main cast for the tvN production Whale Star: The Gyeongseong Mermaid, a historical period romance set in 1926 Seoul, based on Na Yoonhee's webtoon Whale Star: The Gyeongseong Mermaid. The series is currently filming and is scheduled to release in 2027.

== Filmography ==
Key
†	Denotes films that have not yet been released

=== Film ===
Film appearances
Year	Title	Role	Notes	Ref.
2019	Like the First	Manager Joo		
2020	Night in Paradise	President Yang's subordinate 2		
2021	Double Patty	Han Sang-wook		
2024	I, the Executioner	Special Detective		

=== Television series ===
Television appearances
Year	Title	Role	Note	Ref.
2020	Missing: The Other Side	Go Bong-hwan	Special appearance	
2021	Snowdrop	Oh Gwang-tae		
2023	The Matchmakers	Jeong Sun-gu		
2023–2024	Sweet Home	Kang Seok-chan	Season 2–3	
2024	The Impossible Heir	Ha Myeong-jin		
2024	Your Honor	Kim Sang-hyeok		
2024–2025	When the Phone Rings	Ji Sang-woo		
2025	When the Stars Gossip	Lee Seung-joon		
2025	A Hundred Memories	Han Jae-pil		
2026	Perfect Crown	Kim Yeon-jun	Special appearance	
2026	My Royal Nemesis	Cha Se-gye / Grand Prince Cheongheon (Yi Hyeon)		
2027	Whale Star: The Gyeongseong Mermaid †	Song Hae-su		

=== Music video appearances ===
Year	Song Title	Artist	Ref.
2025	"Never Ending Story"	IU	

== Awards and nominations ==
Name of the award ceremony, year presented, category, nominee of the award, and the result of the nomination
Award ceremony	Year	Category	Nominee / Work	Result	Ref.
APAN Star Awards	2024	Best New Actor	Sweet Home, Your Honor	Nominated	
Baeksang Arts Awards	2025	Best New Actor – Broadcasting	Your Honor	Nominated	
Blue Dragon Series Awards	2025	Best New Actor	Your Honor	Nominated	
Brand of the Year Awards	2026	Male Actor (Drama) category	My Royal Nemesis	Won	
Fundex Awards	2026	Best Actor of TV Drama	My Royal Nemesis	Pending	
Korea Broadcasting Awards	2026	Best Actor Award	My Royal Nemesis	Won	
Korea Drama Awards	2025	Best New Actor	When the Phone Rings, When the Stars Gossip	Won	
MBC Drama Awards	2024	Best New Actor	When the Phone Rings	Won	
