= Whale Star: The Gyeongseong Mermaid (TV series) =

Upcoming South Korean television series

- Hangul: 고래별
- Lit.: Whale Star
- RR: Gorae byeol
- MR: Korae pyŏl
- Genre: Historical drama; Romance; Melodrama
- Based on: Whale Star: The Gyeongseong Mermaid by Na Yoon-hee
- Written by: Moru; Seolsup
- Directed by: Hur Jin-ho; Yoo Beom-sang
- Starring: Choi Woo-shik; Moon Ga-young; Heo Nam-jun; Yoo Jae-myung; Kang Han-na; Kim Yeo-jin; Gong Seung-yeon
- Country of origin: South Korea
- Original language: Korean

Production
- Cinematography: Choi Yoon-man
- Production companies: TakeOne Studio; Studio Dragon

Original release
- Network: tvN

Whale Star: The Gyeongseong Mermaid (Korean: 고래별) is an upcoming South Korean historical melodrama television series written by Moru and Seolsup, directed by Hur Jin-ho and Yoo Beom-sang, and starring Choi Woo-shik, Moon Ga-young, Heo Nam-jun, Yoo Jae-myung, Kang Han-na, Kim Yeo-jin, and Gong Seung-yeon. Based on the webtoon of the same title by Na Yoon-hee, the series is set in 1926 during Japanese colonial rule and follows the story of Kang Ui-hyeon, a man sacrificing everything for his country, and Heo Su-a, a woman risking her life to protect him. It is scheduled to premiere on tvN in 2027.

== Synopsis ==
Heo Su-a works as a handmaiden and spends her time swimming in the sea. Her life changes when she finds Kang Ui-hyeon, a wounded independence fighter, washed ashore and nurses him back to health. During a failed assassination attempt by Ui-hyeon’s comrade Song Hae-su, Su-a loses her ability to speak. Driven by a desire for revenge, Su-a travels to Gyeongseong and becomes involved with resistance fighters.

== Cast and characters ==
- Choi Woo-shik as Kang Ui-hyeon

Born to a pro-Japanese family, he goes to Japan to study, where he witnesses the massacre of Koreans during the Great Kantō Earthquake and subsequently joins the independence movement. While conducting a liberation operation with Hae-su, he begins to view Su-a, who saved his life, as his homeland and cares for her deeply.

- Moon Ga-young as Heo Su-a

A 17-year-old maid who serves the daughter of a pro-Japanese landowner during a turbulent era. After dreaming of a wounded whale, she finds Ui-hyeon, a severely injured independence activist who has washed ashore. She secretly nurses him back to health, risking her own life in the process.

- Heo Nam-jun as Song Hae-su

An independence activist with unwavering conviction, driven by the loss of his family.

- Yoo Jae-myung as Kang Geun-hyung

Ui-hyeon's father, who is a pro-Japanese collaborator. An ambitious man, he collaborates with Japan and exploits his son to achieve his own ambitions.

- Kang Han-na as Han Yeon-kyung

A member of Whale Star, a secret organization, and a prestigious family's daughter. Despite losing her husband and family, she remains steadfast in her pursuit of independence, concealing her resentment while continuing the fight.

- Kim Yeo-jin as Hwang Sun-im

The owner of Cafe Whale Star, which serves as a sanctuary and hideout for independence activists in Gyeongseong.

- Gong Seung-yeon as Yeo Yoon-hwa

Daughter of the pro-Japanese and the young lady whom Su-a served.

== Production ==
=== Development ===
TakeOne Studio announced in July 2021 that it would produce a drama based on the webtoon Whale Star: The Gyeongseong Mermaid by Na Yoon-hee, set against the anti-Japanese resistance movement during the Japanese colonial period. It reimagines Hans Christian Andersen's fairy tale The Little Mermaid in a Korean setting. By July 2025, the series was in the final stages of scheduling and casting and would begin preparations for filming. The project, produced by TakeOne Studio and Studio Dragon, is co-directed by Hur Jin-ho and Yoo Beom-sang, co-written by Moru and Seolsup, with cinematography by Choi Yoon-man.

CEO Jung Min-chae of TakeOne Company said that adapting the webtoon required a long preparation period and a difficult casting process. Jung stated the drama had a large budget and that filming began once the cast and script were finalized. He also said the script included new interpretations and episodes not in the original work. He stated the production aimed to appeal to both existing fans and new viewers, and expressed confidence in the project.

In March 2026, the production began accepting submissions for product placement.

tvN was confirmed as the broadcasting network.

=== Casting ===
The casting announcements began in July 2025, with media outlets reporting that Choi Woo-shik and Moon Ga-young were being considered for the lead roles of Kang Ui-hyeon and Heo Su-a, respectively. The next month, Heo Nam-jun was cast as the lead. In February 2026, Gong Seung-yeon was offered the role of Yoon-hwa. Two months later, Kang Han-na was cast. In May 2026, Yoo Jae-myung joined the cast as Ui-hyeon's father.

The main cast was confirmed to include Choi Woo-shik, Moon Ga-young, Heo Nam-jun, Yoo Jae-myung, Kang Han-na, Kim Yeo-jin, and Gong Seung-yeon.

=== Filming ===
In March and April 2023, director Hur Jin-ho conducted site scouting in Gunsan, Jeonbuk Province, including surveys of historic locations such as the Old Gunsan Customs House, Dongguksa Temple, and the House of Yi Yeong-chun. Principal photography commenced on April 24, 2026. Filming primarily took place in Gunsan. According to an EDaily report from July 22, 2026, the series was filming at the Hapcheon Image Theme Park, a large-scale open set featuring streetscapes from the 1920s to the 1980s.

== Release ==
The series was confirmed to premiere on tvN in 2027.
