= Welcome 2 Life =

2019 South Korean television series

- Promotional poster
- Also known as: You Only Live Twice
- Hangul: 웰컴2라이프
- RR: Welkeom2raipeu
- MR: Welk'ŏm2raip'ŭ
- Genre: Fantasy; Romantic comedy
- Written by: Yoo Hee-kyung
- Directed by: Kim Geun-hong; Shim Soo-yeon
- Starring: Jung Ji-hoon; Lim Ji-yeon; Kwak Si-yang
- Country of origin: South Korea
- Original language: Korean
- No. of episodes: 32 (Note: In order to circumvent Korean laws that prevent commercial breaks in the middle of an episode, what would previously have been aired as single 70 minute episodes are now being repackaged as two 35 minute episodes, with two episodes being shown each night with a commercial break between the two.)

Production
- Camera setup: Single-camera
- Running time: 35 minutes
- Production company: Kim Jong-hak Production

Original release
- Network: MBC TV
- Release: August 5 – September 24, 2019

Welcome 2 Life (Korean: 웰컴2라이프) is a 2019 South Korean television series starring Jung Ji-hoon, Lim Ji-yeon and Kwak Si-yang. It aired on MBC TV from August 5 to September 24, 2019.

== Synopsis ==
The series is about a skilled lawyer who enters a parallel world due to an unfortunate accident.

== Cast ==
=== Main ===
- Jung Ji-hoon as Lee Jae-sang, an ace but selfish lawyer from JK Law Firm, one of the nation's top five law firms.
- Lim Ji-yeon as Ra Si-on, Jae-sang's ex-girlfriend who is an impulsive detective and has a tough personality.
- Kwak Si-yang as Goo Dong-tae, a police officer who is Si-on's partner.

=== Supporting ===
==== Yulgaek Law Firm ====
- Han Sang-jin as Kang yoon-gi
- Hong Jin-gi as Moon Ji-ho

==== Sekyung Police Department ====
- Park Shin-ah as Ha Min-hee
- Im Sung-jae as Yang Go-woon

==== Sekyung Prosecution ====
- Choi Phillip as Min Sung-jin
- Jang So-yeon as Bang Young-suk

==== Others ====
- Han Da-sol as In Na-rae
- Seo Ji-hye as Noh Young-mi, Noh Soo-chan's daughter.
- Shin Jae-ha as Yoon Pil-woo, the CEO of Babel Research Center.
- Seo Hye-won as Ring
- Son Byong-ho as Jang Doo-sik
- Kim Joong-ki as Park Gi-beom
- Seol Jung-hwan as Jeong Min-soo, an actor.
- Song Yoo-hyun as Yoo Jin-hee

== Release ==
The series was initially scheduled to premiere on July 29, 2019, but was pushed back for a week due to live coverage of the 2019 World Aquatics Championships.

== Ratings ==
Ep.	Original broadcast date	Average audience share		
Ep.	Original broadcast date	Nielsen Korea		TNmS
Ep.	Original broadcast date	Nationwide	Seoul	Nationwide
1	August 5, 2019	4.5% (N/A)	5.1% (16th)	5.3%
2	August 5, 2019	6.3% (8th)	7.0% (6th)	6.9%
3	August 6, 2019	5.3% (17th)	5.8% (14th)	5.7%
4	August 6, 2019	6.8% (10th)	7.1% (6th)	7.4%
5	August 12, 2019	4.4% (N/A)	N/A	
6	August 12, 2019	5.6% (16th)	6.4% (15th)	7.1%
7	August 13, 2019	4.2% (N/A)	4.9% (N/A)	N/A
8	August 13, 2019	5.0% (15th)	5.6% (16th)	6.0%
9	August 19, 2019	3.9% (N/A)	N/A	N/A
10	August 19, 2019	5.0% (19th)	5.8% (12th)	N/A
11	August 20, 2019	4.3% (N/A)	4.6% (20th)	N/A
12	August 20, 2019	4.5% (20th)	4.7% (18th)	6.1%
13	August 26, 2019	4.1% (N/A)	4.8% (20th)	N/A
14	August 26, 2019	5.5% (14th)	5.9% (12th)	5.2%
15	August 27, 2019	3.5% (N/A)	N/A	N/A
16	August 27, 2019	4.4% (N/A)	N/A	5.9%
17	September 2, 2019	3.8% (N/A)	N/A	5.0%
18	September 2, 2019	4.8% (16th)	4.8% (17th)	6.3%
19	September 3, 2019	4.0% (N/A)	N/A	4.8%
20	September 3, 2019	4.9% (17th)	4.6% (19th)	5.8%
21	September 9, 2019	3.8% (N/A)	N/A	5.0%
22	September 9, 2019	5.1% (16th)	4.9% (17th)	6.2%
23	September 10, 2019	4.2% (N/A)	N/A	4.9%
24	September 10, 2019	5.2% (17th)	5.3% (17th)	6.2%
25	September 16, 2019	3.9% (N/A)	N/A	N/A
26	September 16, 2019	4.7% (19th)	4.9% (19th)	6.2%
27	September 17, 2019	4.4% (N/A)	N/A	5.3%
28	September 17, 2019	5.9% (14th)	6.2% (12th)	6.6%
29	September 23, 2019	N/A	4.6% (19th)	5.5%
30	September 23, 2019	6.1% (13th)	6.3% (11th)	7.2%
31	September 24, 2019	4.2% (19th)	4.2% (19th)	6.5%
32	September 24, 2019	6.0% (12th)	6.2% (8th)	8.4%
In the table above, the blue numbers represent the lowest ratings and the red numbers represent the highest ratings.; N/A denotes that the rating/ranking is not known.

== Awards and nominations ==
Year	Award	Category	Recipient	Result
2019	MBC Drama Awards	Grand Prize (Daesang)	Lim Ji-yeon	Nominated
2019	MBC Drama Awards	Top Excellence Award, Actor in a Monday-Tuesday Miniseries	Jung Ji-hoon	Nominated
2019	MBC Drama Awards	Top Excellence Award, Actress in a Monday-Tuesday Miniseries	Lim Ji-yeon	Won
2019	MBC Drama Awards	Excellence Award, Actor in a Monday-Tuesday Miniseries	Kwak Si-yang	Nominated
2019	MBC Drama Awards	Excellence Award, Actress in a Monday-Tuesday Miniseries	Jang So-yeon	Nominated
2019	MBC Drama Awards	Best New Actress	Park Shin-ah	Nominated
2019	MBC Drama Awards	Best Supporting Cast in Monday-Tuesday Miniseries	Son Byong-ho	Nominated
2019	MBC Drama Awards	Best Young Actor/Actress	Lee Soo-ah	Won
2019	MBC Drama Awards	Best One-minute Couple Award	Lim Ji-yeon and Jung Ji-hoon	Nominated
