= My Royal Nemesis =

2026 South Korean television series

- Promotional poster
- Also known as: Wicked World
- Hangul: 멋진 신세계
- Hanja: 멋진 新世界
- Lit.: Brave New World
- RR: Meotjin sinsegye
- MR: Mŏtchin sinsegye
- Genre: Romantic comedy; Fantasy
- Written by: Kang Hyun-joo
- Directed by: Han Tae-seop
- Starring: Lim Ji-yeon; Heo Nam-jun; Jang Seung-jo
- Music by: Park Sung-il
- Opening theme: "My Royal Nemesis" by Park Sung-il
- Country of origin: South Korea
- Original language: Korean
- No. of episodes: 14

Production
- Producer: Kim Min-tae
- Production companies: Studio S; Studio Dragon; Gill Pictures

Original release
- Network: SBS TV
- Release: May 8 – June 20, 2026

My Royal Nemesis (Korean: 멋진 신세계) is a 2026 South Korean romantic comedy fantasy television series written by Kang Hyun-joo, directed by Han Tae-seop, and starring Lim Ji-yeon, Heo Nam-jun, and Jang Seung-jo. The series tells the story of a legendary Joseon villainess whose soul transmigrates into the body of an actress and her love-hate relationship with a ruthless tycoon in the modern day. The series aired on SBS TV from May 8, to June 20, 2026, every Friday and Saturday at 21:50 (KST). It is also available for streaming on Netflix.

== Synopsis ==
During the Joseon dynasty, Kang Dan-shim gains notoriety at court for her cunning and ambition. Through manipulation and intellect, she ascends to the rank of royal concubine. In the 6th year of King Anjong's reign, Dan-shim died after being forced to drink the poison bowl. Her death triggered a shaman's spell, causing unnatural events such as midsummer frost and a total lunar eclipse.

However, her fate does not end with her death. Her soul awakens in 21st-century South Korea, inhabiting the body of Shin Seo-ri, an unknown actress who plays minor roles in historical dramas. In this unfamiliar era, Dan-shim gradually takes control of Seo-ri's life and, due to her unpredictable nature, quickly adapts to the modern world. She crosses paths with Cha Se-gye, the ruthless chaebol heir. The two develop a tense, conflict-driven relationship complicated by a love-hate dynamic.

Navigating the unfamiliar world, Kang Dan-shim realizes this twist of fate gives her a chance to escape her predetermined destiny and reshape her life.

== Cast and characters ==
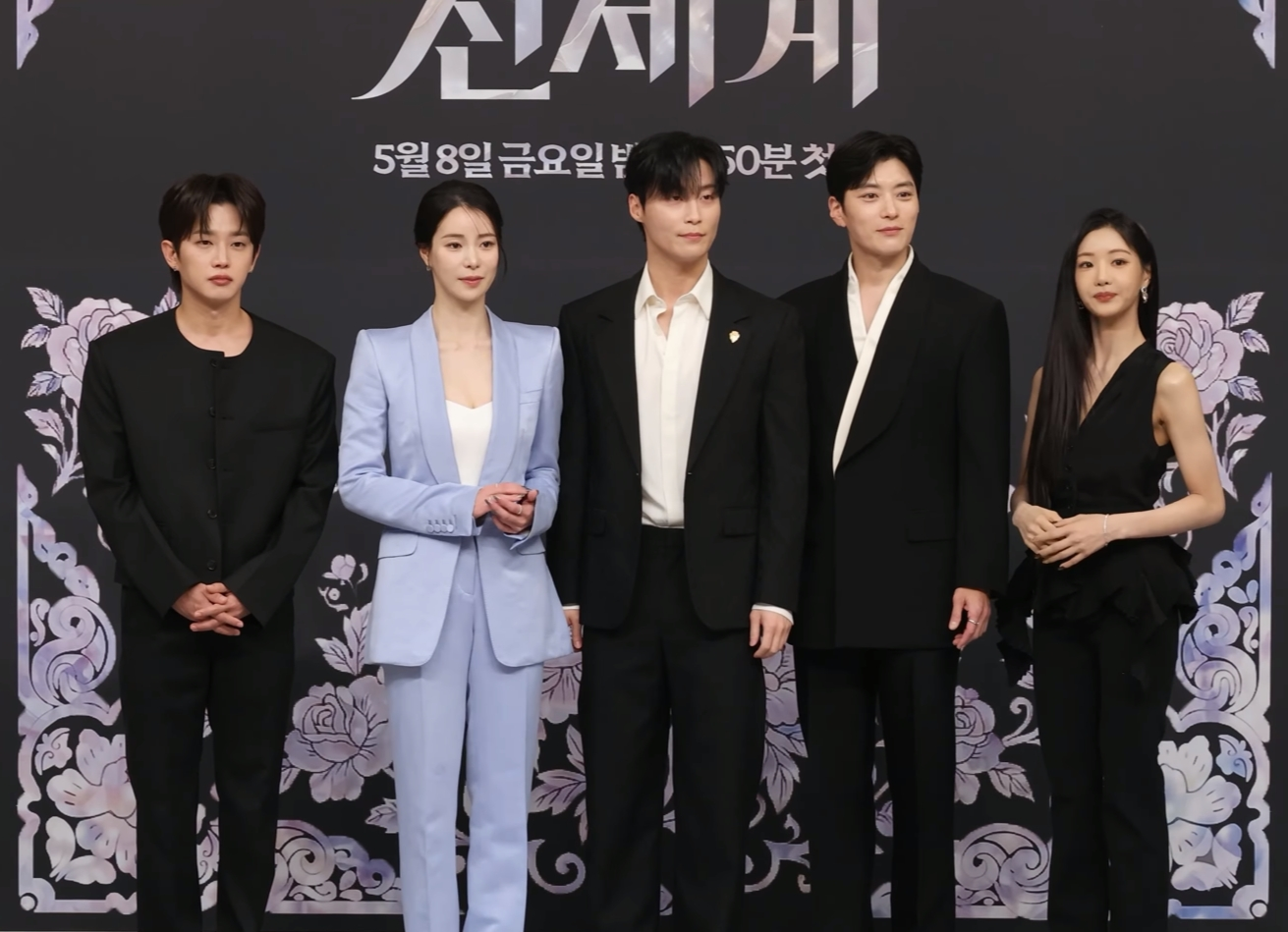
The cast of My Royal Nemesis at the press conference, May 2026 (L to R): Kim Min-seok, Lim Ji-yeon, Heo Nam-jun, Jang Seung-jo, and Lee Se-hee

=== Main ===
- Lim Ji-yeon as Shin Seo-ri / Kang Dan-shim
  - Kang Hye-rin as young Seo-ri / Dan-shim
  - Oh Eun-seo as young Seo-ri
1. Shin Seo-ri: An aspiring actress, Shin Seo-ri was once known as the child lead in the drama Sonagi, but as an adult she became a nameless actress. She later becomes possessed by the spirit of Joseon-era villainess Kang Dan-shim and develops a vicious personality.
2. Kang Dan-shim: A ruthless and cunning concubine of the Joseon dynasty, known as the most reviled villainess in the court. She rose from low birth to the position of first-rank concubine without strong support, leveraging her sharp wit and manipulative tactics. She has an incredibly strong sixth sense. Following her death by poisoning, she awakens 300 years later in 2026 and inhabits the body of Shin Seo-ri, who is filming a poison scene for sageuk drama. In that new world, she crosses paths with Cha Se-gye, who may be her last chance to rewrite her fate. She also decides to keep pursuing Seo-ri's dream of becoming a well-known actress.
- Heo Nam-jun as Cha Se-gye / Grand Prince Cheongheon (Yi Hyeon)
  - Yeom Geon-hwi as young Se-gye
1. Cha Se-gye: The infamous third-generation chaebol heir to Chail Group and CEO of Biojei, he is known as a "monster of capitalism". As he crosses paths with Seo-ri, who's possessed, he is confronted by her.
2. Yi Hyeon: The solitary figure marked by past trauma, he wore a half-mask to conceal facial scars from a mysterious fire he alone survived. Contrasted with Yi Jae, who represents the "light", he is described as the "shadow" and labeled as Ghost Prince and Dokkaebbi (Goblin) Prince (in his time) laler as Ill-fated Prince (in history). He is the youngest son of King Mukjong & his second queen, Lady Min, the younger brother of King Anjong and a scholar who fell in love with Seo-ri/Dan-shim.
- Jang Seung-jo as Choi Moon-do / Anjong (Yi Jae)
  - Lee Woong-jae as teen Moon-do
  - Ki Eun-yoo as young Moon-do
1. Choi Moon-do: The president of Chail Construction and Se-gye's cousin. He made repeated efforts to gain the attention of his uncle, Dal-su. He also volunteered as a liver donor for his uncle, who was suffering from acute liver failure. After becoming President of Chail Construction, he deemed the role insufficient and continued to pursue his uncle's position, while perceiving Cha Se-gye as superior.
2. Yi Jae: The Crown Prince, later reigning King of Joseon who secured his throne through a bloody purge of his brothers. An absolute monarch who believes in ruling with an iron fist to ensure stability, contrasting with his "weak" predecessors. Anjong views his younger brother as unfit to rule due to his facial scars and deems him a threat to his legitimacy. Anjong ordered the death of Kang Dan-shim by forcing her to drink poison (sayak). He used her as a political pawn ("useful pretty knife") to execute a purge, despite her being his brother's lover. He is the second son of King Mukjong and his second queen, Lady Min.

=== Supporting ===
People around Seo-ri

- Kim Min-seok as Baek Gwang-nam

Seo-ri's next-door neighbor who becomes her road manager.

- Lee Se-hee as Yoon Ji-hyo
  - Kim Na-eun as young Ji-hyo

A top star with 19 years of experience in the entertainment industry and Seo-ri's rival.

- Kim Hae-sook as Nam Ok-soon

Seo-ri's beloved and caring grandmother, who raised her since she was a child.

- Baek Ji-won as Hong Bu-seon, CEO of Doran Entertainment.
- Oh Min-ae as Geum Bo-sal / Geum Jeong-ae, a shaman who knows that Seo-ri is a spirit from Joseon.
- Park Jin-woo as Gu Pil-gyu, a Gosiwon manager.

People around Se-gye

- Yoon Byung-hee as Son Jae-chan, Se-gye's right-hand man
- Chae Seo-an as Mo Tae-hee, the precious daughter of Mo Chang Group, who is Se-gye's blind date.
- Yoon Joo-sang as Cha Dal-su, Se-gye's grandfather, who is the Chairman of Chail Group.
- Jung Young-joo as Cha Ju-ran, CEO of Chail Food and Se-gye's eldest aunt.
- Baek Eun-hye as Cha Ju-mi, CEO of Chail Apparel and Se-gye's second aunt.
- Jung Jae-kwang as Sunwoo Jung-hyun, Se-gye's friend and a psychiatrist.

Others

- Kim Gye-rim as Kwak Eun-ah / Unnamed palace attendant
- Oh Man-seok as Jang Seok-ho, a Biojei executive, who was once a founding member of the Chail Group.
- Jeong Jae-hyeok as Seo Nam-jin (Secretary Seo), Moon-do's attendant.
- Shin Jeong-won as Kim Hyun-hee (Secretary Kim), Se-gye's secretary, who is raising two children.
- Kim Hyun as Kwon Jin-ok, the butler in charge of the affairs of Dal-su's mansion.
- Jo Yeo-joon as Choi Seo-joon, Moon-do's son who lives in America.
- Kim Young-woong as Director Kim
- Jang Ha-eun as Na-yeon, Seo-ri's apartment tenant/neighbor at Dabaek goshiwon
- Lee Hwi-seo as Receptionist at BioJei
- Park Ah-in as Han Hye-sun, Se-gye's late mother, who was 90s star actress.
- Seo Kyung-hwa as Queen Dowager (Lady Min), mother of Anjong and Grand Prince Cheongheon
- Ahn Chang-hwan as Actor appearing as the king in the drama Kingdom of Women
- Han Su-a as Min-ah (Special appearance)
- Cha Yup as Mercenary gangster
- Kim Jung-han as Worker
- Su Hyeon as High school girl (Ep.2)
- Han Ji-an-II as Soo-ji
- Cheon Ye-ju as Ga-hee
- Ma Jung-pil as Hospital room suit man [Ep.2]
- Yoo Yong as Hotel CCTV staff [Ep.6-7]

== Production ==
=== Development ===
The series is directed by Han Tae-seop, who helmed Cheer Up (2022) and Hot Stove League (2019–2020), and Kim Hyun-woo, and the screenplay is written by Kang Hyun-joo. The production is handled by Studio S, Studio Dragon and Gill Pictures.

=== Casting ===
In June 2025, Artist Company confirmed that Lim Ji-yeon had received an offer to play the role of Shin Seo-ri and was considering it. The next month, Heo Nam-jun was offered to play the male lead. Lim and Heo's appearances were officially confirmed by October 2025, and Lee Se-hee, Chae Seo-an, Kim Min-seok, and Jang Seung-jo were reportedly cast.

=== Filming ===
Principal photography began in the second half of 2025.

== Release ==
My Royal Nemesis was reportedly scheduled to premiere on SBS TV in the first half of 2026, airing on a Friday–Saturday timeslot. The series' special teaser was unveiled at the 2025 SBS Drama Awards and confirmed for a May 2026 release. By April 2026, the series was confirmed to premiere on May 8. It is also available for streaming on Netflix.

== Original soundtrack ==
Part 1

All lyrics are written by Kim Seo-jeong; all music is composed by Park Sung-il.

Released on May 8, 2026
No.	Title	Artist	Length
1.	"Anyway" (하여튼)	Nam Jong	3:29
2.	"Anyway" (하여튼; Inst.)		3:29
Total length:			6:58

Part 2

All lyrics are written by Lee Chi-hoon; all music is composed by Park Sung-il.

Released on May 16, 2026
No.	Title	Artist	Length
1.	"Season of Us" (다시 돌아온 계절)	Young K	3:36
2.	"Season of Us" (다시 돌아온 계절; Inst.)		3:36
Total length:			7:12

Part 3

All lyrics are written by Seo Dong-seong; all music is composed by Park Sung-il.

Released on May 23, 2026
No.	Title	Artist	Length
1.	"Losing My Heart" (마음을 놓치다)	Gwyn Dorado	4:50
2.	"Losing My Heart" (마음을 놓치다; Inst.)		4:50
Total length:			9:40

Part 4

All lyrics are written by Yoon Song; all music is composed by Yoon Song and Choi Chan-young.

Released on May 29, 2026
No.	Title	Artist	Length
1.	"Universe"	Cheeze	3:07
2.	"Universe" (Inst.)		3:07
Total length:			6:14

Part 5

All lyrics are written by Lee Chi-hoon; all music is composed by Park Sung-il.

Released on June 5, 2026
No.	Title	Artist	Length
1.	"Everyday Miracle" (조용한 기적)	Seo Ja-yeong	4:03
2.	"Everyday Miracle" (조용한 기적; Inst.)		4:03
Total length:			8:06

Part 6

All lyrics are written by Inari; all music is composed by Jeong Jin-wook and Jin Seung-woo.

Released on June 6, 2026
No.	Title	Artist	Length
1.	"Into You"	Onew	2:58
2.	"Into You" (Inst.)		2:58
Total length:			5:56

Part 7

All lyrics are written by Lee Sun; all music is composed by Lee Sun and Yoo Seung-chan.

Released on June 13, 2026
No.	Title	Artist	Length
1.	"Faded Words" (바래진 말들)	An Da-eun	4:06
2.	"Faded Words" (바래진 말들; Inst.)		4:06
Total length:			8:13

== Reception ==
=== Critical reception ===
Professional ratings
Review scores
Source	Rating
Midgard Times	8/10
India Today	3.5/5 stars
Hindustan Times	3/5 stars
Firstpost	3/5 stars

My Royal Nemesis received generally positive reviews for being a fast-paced and entertaining rom-com despite its familiar time-slip premise. Much of the acclaim centers on Lim Ji-yeon's standout dual performance, frequently described as the "true anchor" of the drama. Critics lauded Lim's ability to balance slapstick comedy, emotional depth, and romantic tension. Reviewers highlighted how naturally she switches between a Joseon-era concubine's formal speech and modern comedic situations, while keeping the character emotionally grounded.

Writing for Cine21, cultural critic Oh Soo-kyung commended the series for its active and self-determined female protagonist, describing Hee-bin Kang Dan-sim as one of the more proactive time-travel characters in recent Korean dramas. Oh highlighted the drama’s feminist themes, particularly its reinterpretation of historical "villainous women" such as Jang Hui-bin, and its resonance with modern audiences through themes of independence and rejecting restrictive social roles.

Cultural critic Kim Sung-soo noted the drama’s success in humanizing its Joseon-era villainess and spotlighted Lim Ji-yeon's ability to balance comedy and tragedy. Kim Sujin of Segye Ilbo commended Lim's nuanced dual-role performance, particularly her subtle adjustments in voice pitch and gaze intensity, calling it proof of her status as a leading actress.

In a review for Sports Seoul, Lee Seung-rok lauded Heo Nam-jun's performance, describing him as the drama's "discovery". The review highlighted his strong screen presence, deep voice, precise diction, and nuanced facial expressions, comparing his charisma to a young Lee Byung-hun.

South China Morning Post reviewer Pierce Conran commended Lim Ji-yeon's "spirited performance" in the fish-out-of-water comedy and strong dialect delivery, while describing Heo Nam-jun’s portrayal as charismatic but somewhat familiar within chaebol heir archetypes.

Some reviewers noted that the series relies heavily on familiar K-drama tropes (time travel, enemies-to-lovers, chaebol dynamics), describing it as "old wine in a new bottle" or "predictable" in places. Nevertheless, most found it bingeable thanks to its self-aware humor, strong chemistry between the leads, and confident execution.

India Today called the series "wildly entertaining" and "consistently entertaining". Decider issued a "STREAM IT" recommendation, praising the fun time-travel elements and Lim Ji-yeon's energetic performance despite its heavy reliance on typical K-drama tropes.

=== Ranking ===
On their first week, the series ranked No 1 in Netflix's Top 10 Non-English shows globally with 3,900,000 views for the 4 May 2026 to May 10, 2026. My Royal Nemesis ranked Top 10 in 44 countries worldwide, including not only Asian regions such as Korea, Japan, the Philippines, and Thailand, but also Europe and South America, such as Greece, Brazil, and Mexico. The series became the first among SBS Friday-Saturday drama to rank No.1 on Netflix's weekly Global Top 10 Non-English Shows during its first broadcast week. The series also generated significant buzz in South Korea, leading the drama category on Good Data Corporation FUNdex as of May 26, topping both TV and OTT charts within three weeks of its release. Lim Ji-yeon and Heo Nam-jun ranked second and third in actor popularity respectively. The series maintained their top position in both TV and OTT for their fourth week with Lim, Heo and also Jang Seung-jo ranking first, second and sixth place for actors popularity.

=== Awards and nominations ===
Name of the award ceremony, year presented, category, nominee of the award, and the result of the nomination
Award ceremony	Year	Category	Nominee / Work	Result	Ref.
Brand of The Year Awards	2026	Best Actress (Drama)	Lim Ji-yeon	Won	
Brand of The Year Awards	2026	Male Actor (Drama)	Heo Nam-jun	Won	
Korea Broadcasting Awards	2026	Best Male Actor	Heo Nam-jun	Won	
Korea Drama Awards	2026	Best Drama	My Royal Nemesis	Pending	
Korea Drama Awards	2026	Top Excellence Award, Actress	Lim Ji-yeon	Pending	
Korea Drama Awards	2026	Excellence Award, Actor	Heo Nam-jun	Pending	
Seoul International Drama Awards	2026	Best Actress	Lim Ji-yeon	Won	
Seoul International Drama Awards	2026	Program (Miniseries)	My Royal Nemesis	Won	
Korean Popular Culture and Arts Awards	2026	Minister of Culture, Sports and Tourism Commendation	Lim Ji-Yeon	Won	

== Viewership ==
My Royal Nemesis : South Korea viewers per episode (millions)

Season	Episode number														Average
Season	1	2	3	4	5	6	7	8	9	10	11	12	13	14	Average
1	0.788	1.032	1.117	1.230	1.761	2.033	1.809	2.083	1.840	1.873	1.775	2.033	2.066	2.359	1.699

Source: Audience measurement performed nationwide by Nielsen Korea.

Average TV viewership ratings
Ep.	Original broadcast date	Average audience share (Nielsen Korea)	
Ep.	Original broadcast date	Nationwide	Seoul
1	May 8, 2026	4.1% (10th)	4.3% (8th)
2	May 9, 2026	5.4% (3rd)	5.3% (3rd)
3	May 15, 2026	5.8% (5th)	5.7% (5th)
4	May 16, 2026	6.0% (3rd)	6.0% (3rd)
5	May 22, 2026	9.5% (1st)	8.8% (1st)
6	May 23, 2026	10.3% (2nd)	10.0% (2nd)
7	May 29, 2026	9.4% (1st)	9.3% (1st)
8	May 30, 2026	10.4% (2nd)	10.7% (2nd)
9	June 5, 2026	9.5% (1st)	9.1% (1st)
10	June 6, 2026	9.9% (2nd)	10.2% (2nd)
11	June 12, 2026	9.9% (1st)	10.1% (1st)
12	June 13, 2026	10.5% (2nd)	11.0% (2nd)
13	June 19, 2026	10.7% (2nd)	10.3% (1st)
14	June 20, 2026	11.8% (2nd)	11.8% (2nd)
Average		8.8%	8.8%
In the table above, the blue numbers represent the lowest ratings and the red numbers represent the highest ratings.
