= A Hundred Memories =

2025 South Korean television series

- Promotional poster
- Hangul: 백번의 추억
- RR: Baekbeonui chueok
- MR: Paekpŏnŭi ch'uŏk
- Genre: Coming-of-age; Romance
- Written by: Yang Hee-seung; Kim Bo-ram
- Directed by: Kim Saang-ho
- Starring: Kim Da-mi; Shin Ye-eun; Heo Nam-jun
- Music by: Kwon Young-chan
- Country of origin: South Korea
- Original language: Korean
- No. of episodes: 12

Production
- Running time: 80 minutes
- Production company: SLL

Original release
- Network: JTBC
- Release: September 13 – October 19, 2025

A Hundred Memories (Korean: 백번의 추억) is a 2025 South Korean television series starring Kim Da-mi, Shin Ye-eun, and Heo Nam-jun. It aired on JTBC from September 13, to October 19, 2025, every Saturday and Sunday at 22:40 (KST).

The series is scheduled for release on Viu in selected regions.

== Premise ==
Set in the 1980s, the series follows Go Young-rye, a model bus hostess on route #100 and university hopeful, and Seo Jong-hee, a charismatic newcomer. Their friendship with each other and romantic entanglement with Han Jae-pil, their destined first love—son of a wealthy department store owner—lead to a coming-of-age tale of youth, love, and growth.

== Cast ==
=== Main ===
- Kim Da-mi as Go Young-rye

A dedicated bus hostess who supports her mother and dreams of going to university.

- Shin Ye-eun as Seo Jong-hee

A confident and charming newcomer who develops a deep friendship with Young-rye.

- Heo Nam-jun as Han Jae-pil

A third-generation chaebol heir and the girls' shared first love.

=== Supporting ===
Go Young-rye's family

- Jeon Sung-woo as Ko Young-sik

A tsundere older brother of Yeong-rye and a law student at a prestigious university.

- Lee Jung-eun as Park Man-Ok

Young-rye's mother

- Kim Tae-vin as Go Young-bae
  - Jo Yi-hyun as teen Young-bae

Young-rye's younger brother

- Park Ji-yun as Go Young-mi
  - Kim Kyu-na as teen Young-mi

Young-rye's younger sister

Jungshin High School

- Lee Won-jung as Ma Sang-cheol

Jae-pil's bestfriend

- Oh Seung-baek as Jang Deok-gu
- Yoon Hee-sun as Choi Sang-muk

Cheong-A Transportation

- Jung Bo-min as Hoo-sook
- Park Ji-hwan as Noh Sang-sik

The head of the labor department at Cheong-A Transportation Company.

Han Jae-pil's family

- Yoon Je-moon as Han Ki-bok

Jae-pil's father

- Oh Eun-seo as Han Se-ri
  - Kim Tae-yeon as teen Se-ri

Jae-pil's younger half-sister

- Kim Ji-hyun as Sung Man-ok

Jae-pil's stepmother and Se-ri's mother

=== Special appearance ===
- Kim Jung-hyun as Jung Hyun

A fellow chaebol entangled in the main trio's lives.

== Production ==
The project is produced by SLL, written by Yang Hee-seung and Kim Bo-ram, and directed by Kim Sang-ho, known for Thirty-Nine (2022). Earlier casting rumors involving Choi Woo-shik were denied by his agency.

== Reception ==
A Hundred Memories received generally positive commentary for its emotional depth, character development, and nostalgic portrayal of 1980s Korea. Critics and reviewers highlighted the drama’s focus on lasting friendship particularly between the two female leads over traditional romantic rivalry, and appreciated its rich period atmosphere and thoughtful narrative beats.

Rather than portraying female rivalry, the drama underscores the deep bond between Young-rye and Jong-hee, which remains central even amid love interests and personal challenges.

== Viewership ==
A Hundred Memories : South Korea viewers per episode (millions)

| Season | Episode number | | | | | | | | | | | | Average |
| Season | 1 | 2 | 3 | 4 | 5 | 6 | 7 | 8 | 9 | 10 | 11 | 12 | Average |
|---|---|---|---|---|---|---|---|---|---|---|---|---|---|
| 1 | 0.760 | 0.898 | 1.008 | 1.188 | 0.951 | 1.321 | 1.136 | 1.415 | 1.288 | 1.717 | 1.541 | 1.906 | 1.261 |

Source: Audience measurement performed nationwide by Nielsen Korea.

Average TV viewership ratings
| Ep. | Original broadcast date | Average audience share | |
| Ep. | Original broadcast date | (Nielsen Korea) | |
| Ep. | Original broadcast date | Nationwide | Seoul |
|---|---|---|---|
| 1 | September 13, 2025 | 3.280% (1st) | 3.455% (1st) |
| 2 | September 14, 2025 | 3.587% (1st) | 3.860% (1st) |
| 3 | September 20, 2025 | 4.311% (1st) | 4.251% (1st) |
| 4 | September 21, 2025 | 4.931% (1st) | 4.981% (1st) |
| 5 | September 27, 2025 | 3.989% (1st) | 4.048% (1st) |
| 6 | September 28, 2025 | 5.699% (1st) | 5.735% (1st) |
| 7 | October 4, 2025 | 4.628% (1st) | 4.085% (1st) |
| 8 | October 5, 2025 | 5.777% (1st) | 5.440% (1st) |
| 9 | October 11, 2025 | 5.495% (1st) | 5.635% (1st) |
| 10 | October 12, 2025 | 7.482% (1st) | 7.255% (1st) |
| 11 | October 18, 2025 | 6.652% (1st) | 6.329% (1st) |
| 12 | October 19, 2025 | 8.109% (1st) | 7.787% (1st) |
| Average | | 5.328% | 5.238% |
In the table above, the blue numbers represent the lowest ratings and the red numbers represent the highest ratings.; This drama aired on a cable channel/pay TV which normally has a relatively smaller audience compared to free-to-air TV/public broadcasters (KBS, SBS, MBC, and EBS).

== Accolades ==
Name of the award ceremony, year presented, category, nominee of the award, and the result of the nomination
| Award ceremony | Year | Category | Nominee | Result | Ref. |
|---|---|---|---|---|---|
| APAN Star Awards | 2025 | Excellence Award, Actress in a Miniseries | Shin Ye-eun | Won | |
