= Revolver (2024 film) =

South Korean action film by Oh Seung-uk

- Theatrical release poster
- Hangul: 리볼버
- RR: Ribolbeo
- MR: Ribolbŏ
- Directed by: Oh Seung-uk
- Written by: Oh Seung-uk; Joo Byeol
- Produced by: Han Jae-deok; Park Min-jung
- Starring: Jeon Do-yeon; Ji Chang-wook; Lim Ji-yeon
- Cinematography: Kang Kook-hyun
- Edited by: Kim Sang-beom
- Music by: Jo Yeong-wook
- Production companies: Sanai Pictures; Plus M Entertainment; Story Rooftop
- Distributed by: Plus M Entertainment
- Release date: 7 August 2024
- Running time: 114 minutes
- Country: South Korea
- Language: Korean
- Box office: US$1.8 million

Revolver (Korean: 리볼버) is a 2024 South Korean action crime film written and directed by Oh Seung-uk, starring Jeon Do-yeon, Ji Chang-wook, and Lim Ji-yeon. It was released theatrically on August 7, 2024.

== Plot ==
Police officer Soo-young, who was waiting to move into her dream new apartment, gets involved in an unexpected corruption scandal and accepts a substantial reward to take the fall for the crimes. Two years later, on the day of her release, Soo-young is greeted by a stranger named Yoon-sun, someone she has never met before. Sensing something is amiss, Soo-young sets out to find Andy, the man who promised her compensation. As she delves deeper, she uncovers a far more dangerous and powerful force behind the scheme.

== Cast ==
- Jeon Do-yeon as Ha Soo-young, a former police officer who was promised a large reward but ended up losing everything
- Ji Chang-wook as Andy/Mad Dog, former Eastern Promise representative who promised Soo-young a huge reward but broke his promise. He is Grace's "brother", but later revealed be her son
- Lim Ji-yeon as Jeong Yoon-sun
- Kim Jun-han as Shin Dong-ho, a detective and Soo-young's former colleague who monitors her under the Chief's orders
- Kim Jong-soo as Chief director of Eastern Promice
- Jeon Hye-jin as Grace, CEO of Eastern Promise who is Andy's "older sister", but later revealed be his mother
- Jung Man-sik as Jo Jae-hoon, president/owner of a screen golf facility who was owner of the club where a past corruption scandal occurred
- Oh Eui-shik as Hong In-gi
- Yoon Kyung-ho as Attorney Yang
- Yang Hyun-Min as Park Kyung-ryong
- Kim Hye-eun as Shaman
- Kim Joon-bae as a monk
- Yoo Seong-ju as Chief Kwon
- Lee Jung-jae as Lim Seok-yong
- Jung Jae-young as Min Ki-hyun
- Park Min-jung as Bodyguard

== Reception ==
=== Box office ===
As of August 14, 2024, Revolver has grossed $1.7 million with a running total of 226,986 tickets sold.

=== Accolades ===
Award	Year	Category	Recipient(s)	Result	Ref.
Baeksang Arts Awards	2025	Best Film	Revolver	Nominated	
Baeksang Arts Awards	2025	Best Director	Oh Seung-uk	Won	
Baeksang Arts Awards	2025	Best Actress	Jeon Do-yeon	Won	
Baeksang Arts Awards	2025	Best Supporting Actress	Lim Ji-yeon	Nominated	
Baeksang Arts Awards	2025	Best Screenplay	Oh Seung-uk, Joo Byul	Nominated	
Blue Dragon Film Awards	2024	Best Actress	Jeon Do-yeon	Nominated	
Blue Dragon Film Awards	2024	Best Supporting Actress	Lim Ji-yeon	Nominated	
Blue Dragon Film Awards	2024	Best Cinematography and Lighting	Kang Kuk-hyun, Kim Hyo-sung	Nominated	
Blue Dragon Film Awards	2024	Best Art Direction	Park Il-hyeon	Nominated	
Blue Dragon Film Awards	2024	Technical Award	Cho Sang-gyeong (Costume Design)	Nominated	
Buil Film Awards	2024	Best Film	Revolver	Won	
Buil Film Awards	2024	Best Director	Oh Seung-uk	Nominated	
Buil Film Awards	2024	Best Actress	Jeon Do-yeon	Nominated	
Buil Film Awards	2024	Best Supporting Actress	Lim Ji-yeon	Won	
Buil Film Awards	2024	Best Cinematography	Kang Kuk-hyun	Won	
Busan Film Critics Awards	2024	Grand Prize	Revolver	Won	
Busan Film Critics Awards	2024	Best Actress	Jeon Do-yeon	Won	
