= Rose Mansion =

2022 South Korean web series

- Promotional poster
- Also known as: The Mansion
- Genre: Thriller; Suspense; Mystery; Crime
- Developed by: TVING
- Written by: Yoo Kab-yeol
- Directed by: Chang
- Music by: Woo-joo
- Country of origin: South Korea
- Original language: Korean
- No. of episodes: 12

Production
- Production companies: SLL; B.A. Entertainment; Film Monster

Original release
- Network: TVING
- Release: May 13 – May 27, 2022

Rose Mansion (Korean: 장미맨션; RR: Jangmimaensyeon) is a South Korean web series starring Lim Ji-yeon and Yoon Gyun-sang. It premiered on TVING on May 13, 2022.

== Synopsis ==
A mystery thriller that pursues the truth of a missing sister in an apartment that is scheduled to be reconstructed. Suspicious neighbors who hide their greed behind ordinary appearances and the secrets that are revealed the more they dig are expected to provide intense suspense in conjunction with the extreme fear of reality.

== Cast ==
- Lim Ji-yeon as Ji-Na
- Yoon Kyun-sang as Min-soo
- Son Byong-ho as Ji-Na's father
- Jung Woong-in as Jang Won-seok
- Jo Dal-hwan as Woo-hyeok
- Kim Jung-woo as Dong-hyun
- Lee Mi-do as Seok-ja
- Kim Do-yoon as Charlie, He was a student from abroad and opened a supermarket while taking care of his mother who had mental health problems.
- Song Bo-eun as People living upstairs at the scene
- Ae-joo
- Lee Moon-sik
- Song Ji-in as Ji-hyun
- Ko Kyu-Pil as Obom, informant hacker and criminal with a criminal record.
- Jung Ae-ri

== Production ==
=== Controversy ===
On May 19, 2022, the production staff apologized for the scene of a stray cat being abused and killed in episode 4, and that scene has been removed and reworked.
