= Nice to Not Meet You =

2025 South Korean television series

- Promotional poster
- Hangul: 얄미운 사랑
- Lit.: Annoying Love
- RR: Yalmiun sarang
- MR: Yalmiun sarang
- Genre: Romantic comedy
- Written by: Jeong Yeo-rang
- Directed by: Kim Ga-Ram
- Starring: Lee Jung-jae; Lim Ji-yeon; Kim Ji-hoon; Seo Ji-hye
- Country of origin: South Korea
- Original language: Korean
- No. of episodes: 16

Production
- Running time: 70 minutes
- Production companies: Studio Dragon; Studio&NEW; Artist Company

Original release
- Network: tvN
- Release: November 3 – December 30, 2025

Nice to Not Meet You (Korean: 얄미운 사랑) is a 2025 South Korean television series starring Lee Jung-jae, Lim Ji-yeon, Kim Ji-hoon and Seo Ji-hye. It aired on tvN from November 3, to December 30, 2025, every Monday and Tuesday at 20:50 (KST). It is also available for streaming on TVING and Wavve in South Korea and on Amazon Prime Video internationally.

== Synopsis ==
The story revolves around Lim Hyun-joon, a stereotypical actor who longs for a fresh start in a melodrama series. He meets a veteran journalist named Wi Jeong-sin who is suddenly reassigned to the entertainment department.

== Cast ==
=== Main ===
- Lee Jung-jae as Lim Hyun-joon

A once-forgotten actor who returns to fame as a righteous detective star.

- Lim Ji-yeon as Wi Jeong-sin

A justice-driven reporter demoted from politics to entertainment.

- Kim Ji-hoon as Lee Jae-hyung

A former baseball star who lost his career to injury and CEO of Sports Eunsung.

- Seo Ji-hye as Yoon Hwa-young

An entertainment editor at Sports Eunsung.

=== Supporting ===
==== People around Lim Hyun-joon ====
- Choi Gwi-hwa as Hwang Ji-sun

Hyun-joon's agency King's Back CEO.

- Kim Hyun-jin as Lim Sun-woo

Hyun-joon's younger half-brother who got into med school but secretly pursues acting instead.

- Na Young-hee as Song Ae-sook

Hyun-joon's mother and former actress.

==== People around Wi Jeong-sin ====
- Jin Ho-eun as Wi Hong-shin

Jeong-sin's younger brother who befriends Sun-woo at acting school.

==== People around Lee Jae-hyung ====
- Jeon Su-kyung as Oh Mi-ran

Jae-hyung's mother and Dae-ho's adoptive mother.

- Kim Jae-cheol as Lee Dae-ho

Jae-hyung's half-brother and corrupt chairman of Eunsung Group.

==== People around Yoon Hwa-young ====
- Kim Beop-rae as Hong Guk-kang

The cowardly editor-in-chief at Sports Eunsung.

==== Others ====
- Oh Yeon-seo as Kwon Se-na

Hyun-joon's ex and a global superstar.

- Jeon Seong-woo as Park Byung-gi

An indie film prodigy turned hit drama writer-director.

- Jo Hee-bong as CEO Son

A money-driven producer.

- Park Hae-rin as Ban Soo-jung

== Production ==
On August 18, 2025, Studio&New announced that it had signed a co-production agreement with Artist Company to co-produce three series, including Nice to Not Meet You. The series is directed by Kim Ga-ram, who worked on Nevertheless (2021), Good Partner (2024), and written by Jeong Yeo-rang, who wrote Five Enough (2016) and Doctor Cha (2023). It is planned by Studio Dragon and co-produced by Studio&NEW and Artist Company.

=== Filming ===
On March 21, 2025, it was announced that the script reading for the series had been completed and filming had begun.

== Release ==
Nice to Not Meet You was confirmed to broadcast on tvN on November 3, 2025, every Monday and Tuesday at 20:50 (KST). It is also available for streaming on TVING and Wavve in South Korea and Amazon Prime Video internationally.

== Viewership ==
Nice to Not Meet You : South Korea viewers per episode (thousands)

Season	Episode number																Average
Season	1	2	3	4	5	6	7	8	9	10	11	12	13	14	15	16	Average
1	1272	1101	961	1034	1060	751	992	977	1068	1084	979	1038	864	954	924	1057	1007

Source: Audience measurement performed nationwide by Nielsen Korea.

Average TV viewership ratings
Ep.	Original broadcast date	Average audience share (Nielsen Korea)	
Ep.	Original broadcast date	Nationwide	Seoul
1	November 3, 2025	5.456% (2nd)	5.190% (2nd)
2	November 4, 2025	4.790% (2nd)	4.815% (2nd)
3	November 10, 2025	4.242% (1st)	4.216% (1st)
4	November 11, 2025	4.491% (1st)	4.643% (1st)
5	November 17, 2025	4.581% (1st)	4.801% (1st)
6	November 18, 2025	3.130% (2nd)	3.399% (2nd)
7	November 24, 2025	4.223% (1st)	4.444% (1st)
8	November 25, 2025	4.094% (1st)	4.089% (1st)
9	December 1, 2025	4.674% (1st)	4.465% (1st)
10	December 2, 2025	4.715% (1st)	4.823% (1st)
11	December 15, 2025	4.440% (1st)	4.712% (1st)
12	December 16, 2025	4.728% (2nd)	5.043% (1st)
13	December 22, 2025	3.971% (1st)	4.028% (1st)
14	December 23, 2025	4.424% (1st)	4.301% (1st)
15	December 29, 2025	4.367% (1st)	4.462% (1st)
16	December 30, 2025	4.807% (1st)	4.413% (1st)
Average		4.446%	4.490%
In the table above, the blue numbers represent the lowest ratings and the red numbers represent the highest ratings.; This drama aired on a cable channel/pay TV which normally has a relatively smaller audience compared to free-to-air TV/public broadcasters (KBS, SBS, MBC, and EBS).
