= When the Phone Rings =

2024 South Korean television series

- Promotional poster
- Hangul: 지금 거신 전화는
- Hanja: 只今 거신 電話는
- Lit.: The Number You Have Dialed
- RR: Jigeum geosin jeonhwaneun
- MR: Chigŭm kŏsin chŏnhwanŭn
- Genre: Melodrama; Romance; Mystery; Thriller
- Based on: The Number You Have Dialed by Geon Eomul Nyeo
- Developed by: Kwon Seong-chang
- Written by: Kim Ji-woon
- Directed by: Park Sang-woo; Wi Deuk-gyu
- Starring: Yoo Yeon-seok; Chae Soo-bin; Heo Nam-jun; Jang Gyu-ri
- Music by: Roh Hyeong-woo
- Opening theme: "When the Phone Rings" by Oh Hee-joon
- Country of origin: South Korea
- Original language: Korean
- No. of episodes: 12

Production
- Executive producers: Oh Jin-seung; Lee Min-ji
- Producers: Lee Dae-yong; Park Ji-eun; Bae Ji-hyun; Moon Seok-hwan; Oh Kwang-hee; Park Ho-sik
- Running time: 64–70 minutes
- Production companies: Bon Factory; Baram Pictures

Original release
- Network: MBC TV
- Release: November 22, 2024 – January 4, 2025

When the Phone Rings (Korean: 지금 거신 전화는) is a 2024–2025 South Korean television series written by Kim Ji-woon, co-directed by Park Sang-woo and Wi Deuk-gyu, and starring Yoo Yeon-seok, Chae Soo-bin, Heo Nam-jun, and Jang Gyu-ri. It premiered on MBC TV on November 22, 2024, and aired every Friday and Saturday at 21:50 (KST) for 12 episodes. It is available for streaming on Netflix in selected regions.

== Synopsis ==
When the Phone Rings is a story that unfolds when a Show Window couple, who have been living without speaking to each other for three years in an arranged marriage, receive a threatening phone call from a kidnapper.

== Cast ==
=== Main ===
- Yoo Yeon-seok as Baek Sa-eon
  - Lee Jae-hoon as young Sa-eon

A former war correspondent and announcer, Baek is from a politically connected family. He is the youngest presidential spokesperson.

- Chae Soo-bin as Hong Hee-joo / Na Hee-joo
  - Shin Yeon-woo as young Hee-joo

A sign language interpreter, who lost her voice due to a traffic accident from childhood. She is Sa-eon's wife.

- Heo Nam-jun as Ji Sang-woo
  - Kang Ji-yong as young Sang-woo

A psychiatrist who is also active as a YouTuber at the same time, which is mostly related to unsolved cases.

- Jang Gyu-ri as Na Yu-ri

A broadcasting station announcer and Sa-eon's junior. She is a cheerful person.

=== Supporting ===
==== Sa-eon's family ====
- Jung Dong-hwan as Baek Jang-ho

Sa-eon's late grandfather and politician.

- Yoo Sung-joo as Baek Ui-yong

Sa-eon's father and candidate of an upcoming presidential election.

- Chu Sang-mi as Shim Kyu-jin

Sa-eon's mother.

==== Hee-joo's family ====
- Choi Kwang-il as Hong Il-kyung

The chairman of Cheongwoon Ilbo. Hee-joo's stepfather.

- Oh Hyun-kyung as Kim Yeon-hui

A former club singer. Hee-joo's mother. Il-kyung's second wife.

- Han Jae-yi as Hong In-ah
  - Yoon Seo-yeon as young In-ah

Il-kyung's eldest daughter.

- Park Won-sang as Na Jin-cheol

Hee-joo's biological father. A former club host. He is hospitalized in a nursing home after being diagnosed with dementia.

==== People in the presidential office ====
- Im Chul-soo as Kang Young-woo

A Spokesperson's Office Manager.

- Choi Woo-jin as Park Do-jae

A special administrative officer who most closely assists Sa-eon.

- Park Sun-young as Kim Soo-young

A Spokesperson's Office Administrative Officer.

- Song Jin-hee as Ahn Jin-hee

A Spokesperson's Office Administrative Officer.

- Jung Ji-hwan as Jeong Won-bin

A rookie sign language interpreter.

==== People around Sa-eon ====
- Ko Sang-ho as Jang Hyuk-jin

A reporter and Sa-eon's close friend.

- Kim Jun-bae as Jung Sang-hoon

A fisherman who adopted Sa-eon as his son before Sa-eon became the Baek family's grandson.

- Hong Seo-jun as Min Do-ki

An experienced servant who handles all Baek family's affairs and also serves as Sa-eon's father's personal secretary.

==== People around Hee-joo ====
- Yang Jo-ah as Han Jin-yi

A director of the Sign Language Interpretation Center.

==== Other ====
- Park Jae-yoon as the kidnapper

== Episodes ==
No.	Title	Original release date
1	"Episode 1"	November 22, 2024
Politician Baek Sa-eon and selectively mute sign-language interpreter Hong Hee-joo have spent the past three years in a loveless arranged marriage. While she is driving at night, a masked man forcibly enters Hee-joo's vehicle and threatens her. He calls Sa-eon and demands ransom for his wife, but Sa-eon refuses to cooperate without evidence and suggests that he call again when Hee-joo is dead. Though he believes the call to be a scam, Sa-eon attempts to trace the call. Hee-joo, hurt by her husband's words, escapes by crashing her car and does not tell Sa-eon she was kidnapped. Hee-joo recalls the clause in her pre-nup that forbids her from initiating divorce. Hee-joo attends a party with Sa-eon, posing only as his interpreter for a deaf guest. In the bathroom, Hee-joo calls Sa-eon from the kidnapper's phone and speaks to him, her voice disguised by a voice modulator. "He" blackmails Sa-eon with knowledge of his failed wedding to Hee-joo's older sister In-ah, which prompted Sa-eon to privately marry Hee-joo instead. "He" orders Sa-eon to divorce Hee-joo and return to In-ah. Sa-eon refuses and vows to track "him" down.
2	"Episode 2"	November 23, 2024
3	"Episode 3"	November 29, 2024
4	"Episode 4"	November 30, 2024
5	"Episode 5"	December 13, 2024
6	"Episode 6"	December 14, 2024
7	"Episode 7"	December 20, 2024
8	"Episode 8"	December 21, 2024
9	"Episode 9"	December 27, 2024
10	"Episode 10"	December 28, 2024
11	"Episode 11"	January 3, 2025
12	"Episode 12"	January 4, 2025

== Production ==
=== Development ===
When the Phone Rings series is planned by Kwon Sung-chang, written by Kim Ji-woon, who previously wrote Doctor John (2019) and Melancholia (2021), and co-directed by Park Sang-woo, who previously directed The Forbidden Marriage (2022–2023), and Wi Deuk-gyu. It was produced by Bon Factory and Baram Pictures. It is based on the popular Kakao Page web novel The Number You Have Dialed by Geon Eomul Nyeo. The series consists of 12 episodes.

On May 8, 2024, MBC announced that they had finalized the casting for the series and were starting the production.

=== Casting ===
On March 13, 2024, Yoo Yeon-seok and Chae Soo-bin are under review considering appearing in the series. On June 27, it was reported that Jang Gyu-ri received an offer for the series and is positively reviewing it. On May 8, Yoo and Chae had been confirmed to appear in the series. On September 24, Yoo, Chae, Heo Nam-jun, and Jang had confirmed their appearances as the main characters in the series.

== Release ==
When the Phone Rings premiered on MBC TV on November 22, 2024, and aired every Friday and Saturday at 21:50 (KST). Netflix announced that the series would be available for streaming exclusively on its platform.

== Original soundtrack ==
=== Part 1 ===
Released on November 30, 2024
No.	Title	Lyrics	Music	Artist	Length
1.	"See The Light"	Kinsha	AllThou; Suhyun Kim	Im Hyun-sik	3:02
2.	"See The Light" (Inst.)		AllThou; Suhyun Kim		3:02
Total length:					6:04

=== Part 2 ===
Released on December 7, 2024
No.	Title	Lyrics	Music	Artist	Length
1.	"Numb"	Red Anne (BadX); Nam Hee-yoon (Anne Story)	Maxx Song (BadX); Sam Carter (MonoTree); Jisan Park (BadX); True Choi (BadX); Ton Kim	Lim Yeon	3:17
2.	"Numb" (Inst.)		Maxx Song (BadX); Sam Carter (MonoTree); Jisan Park (BadX); True Choi (BadX); Ton Kim		3:17
Total length:					6:34

=== Part 3 ===
Released on December 14, 2024
No.	Title	Lyrics	Music	Artist	Length
1.	"Hear Me Out"	Kim A-Hyun	Kim Lee-Hyeon; Noh Hyeong-Woo	Suran	3:43
2.	"Hear Me Out" (Inst.)		Kim Lee-Hyeon; Noh Hyeong-Woo		3:43
Total length:					7:26

=== Part 4 ===
Released on December 21, 2024
No.	Title	Lyrics	Music	Artist	Length
1.	"May l Love You?"	Dinnercoat	Kim Dinnercoat; Yoo Junghyun	Jae Yeon	3:53
2.	"May l Love You?" (Inst.)		Kim Dinnercoat; Yoo Junghyun		3:53
Total length:					7:44

=== Part 5 ===
Released on December 28, 2024
No.	Title	Lyrics	Music	Artist	Length
1.	"I Feel It Now"	sla; Im Se-Jun; Klozer	Klozer; Im Se-Jun; sla; Sondia	Whee In	3:54
2.	"I Feel It Now" (Inst.)		Klozer; Im Se-Jun; sla; Sondia		3:54
Total length:					7:45

=== Part 6 ===
Released on January 4, 2025
No.	Title	Lyrics	Music	Artist	Length
1.	"Say My Name"	Chae Si-hyeon	Alysa; William Seldahl	Yoo Yeon-seok	3:30
2.	"Say My Name" (Inst.)		Alysa; William Seldahl		3:30
Total length:					7:00

=== Chart performance ===
List of singles, showing year released, with selected chart positions and notes
Title	Year	Peak chart positions	Notes
Title	Year	US World	Notes
"See The Light" (Im Hyun-sik)	2024	10	Part 1
"Say My Name" (Yoo Yeon-seok)	2025	7	Part 6

== Reception ==
=== Viewership ===
When The Phone Rings debuted on Netflix with 3.3 million views, peaked at 6.6 million views, and ended its run with 4.6 million views during its final week. In the series finale, it achieved second place in the TV-OTT drama category for buzzworthiness, as reported by Good Data Corporation's FUNdex.

When the Phone Rings : South Korea viewers per episode (millions)

Season	Episode number												Average
Season	1	2	3	4	5	6	7	8	9	10	11	12	Average
1	0.852	0.855	0.942	1.020	1.054	1.343	1.048	1.248	1.130	1.380	1.469	1.652	1.166

Source: Audience measurement performed nationwide by Nielsen Korea.

Average TV viewership ratings
Ep.	Original broadcast date	Average audience share	
Ep.	Original broadcast date	Nielsen Korea	
Ep.	Original broadcast date	Nationwide	Seoul
1	November 22, 2024	5.5% (9th)	5.4% (9th)
2	November 23, 2024	4.7% (11th)	4.8% (7th)
3	November 29, 2024	6.0% (9th)	5.6% (11th)
4	November 30, 2024	5.7% (4th)	6.0% (3rd)
5	December 13, 2024	5.9% (9th)	5.3% (9th)
6	December 14, 2024	6.9% (5th)	6.4% (5th)
7	December 20, 2024	6.0% (10th)	5.1% (9th)
8	December 21, 2024	7.0% (2nd)	6.8% (3rd)
9	December 27, 2024	6.4% (9th)	6.0% (9th)
10	December 28, 2024	7.5% (3rd)	7.4% (3rd)
11	January 3, 2025	8.3% (4th)	8.8% (4th)
12	January 4, 2025	8.6% (3rd)	8.5% (3rd)
Average		6.5%	6.3%
In the table above, the blue numbers represent the lowest ratings and the red numbers represent the highest ratings.

=== Accolades ===
Name of the award ceremony, year presented, category, nominee of the award, and the result of the nomination
Award ceremony	Year	Category	Nominee / Work	Result	Ref.
MBC Drama Awards	2024	Best Couple Award	Chae Soo-bin and Yoo Yeon-seok	Won	
MBC Drama Awards	2024	Best New Actress	Jang Gyu-ri	Nominated	
MBC Drama Awards	2024	Best New Actor	Heo Nam-jun	Won	
MBC Drama Awards	2024	Best Supporting Actress	Chu Sang-mi	Nominated	
MBC Drama Awards	2024	Drama of the Year	When the Phone Rings	Nominated	
MBC Drama Awards	2024	Excellence Award, Actress in a Miniseries	Chae Soo-bin	Won	
MBC Drama Awards	2024	Grand Prize (Daesang)	Yoo Yeon-seok	Nominated	
MBC Drama Awards	2024	Top Excellence Award, Actor in a Miniseries	Yoo Yeon-seok	Won	

=== Sales ===
Following the series' release, the original web novel and webtoon saw significant increases in popularity. The web novel experienced a substantial rise in both viewership and sales, reaching the top spot on KakaoPage's daily web novel rankings. Similarly, the webtoon, which debuted shortly before the drama series, climbed to the number two in KakaoPage's weekly romance webtoon rankings, demonstrating a notable increase in viewership and sales.

=== Criticisms ===
The initial episode featured a scene portraying the fictional country of Paltima issuing airstrikes against another country, Izmael, as well as holding Korean nationals hostage. Many viewers believed the two countries represented Palestine and Israel, respectively. This led to netizens boycotting the show, claiming that the portrayal of the Israeli–Palestinian conflict was insensitive. Others accused the show's creators of misrepresenting the conflict or pushing a Zionist agenda. The creators have yet to clarify on the controversy. A user on MyDramaList later claimed there was a translation error that altered the narrative of the scene, as the original dialogue and visuals depict Izmael as the country issuing airstrikes on Paltima, instead of the other way around.
