= Lim Ji-yeon =

South Korean actress (born 1990)

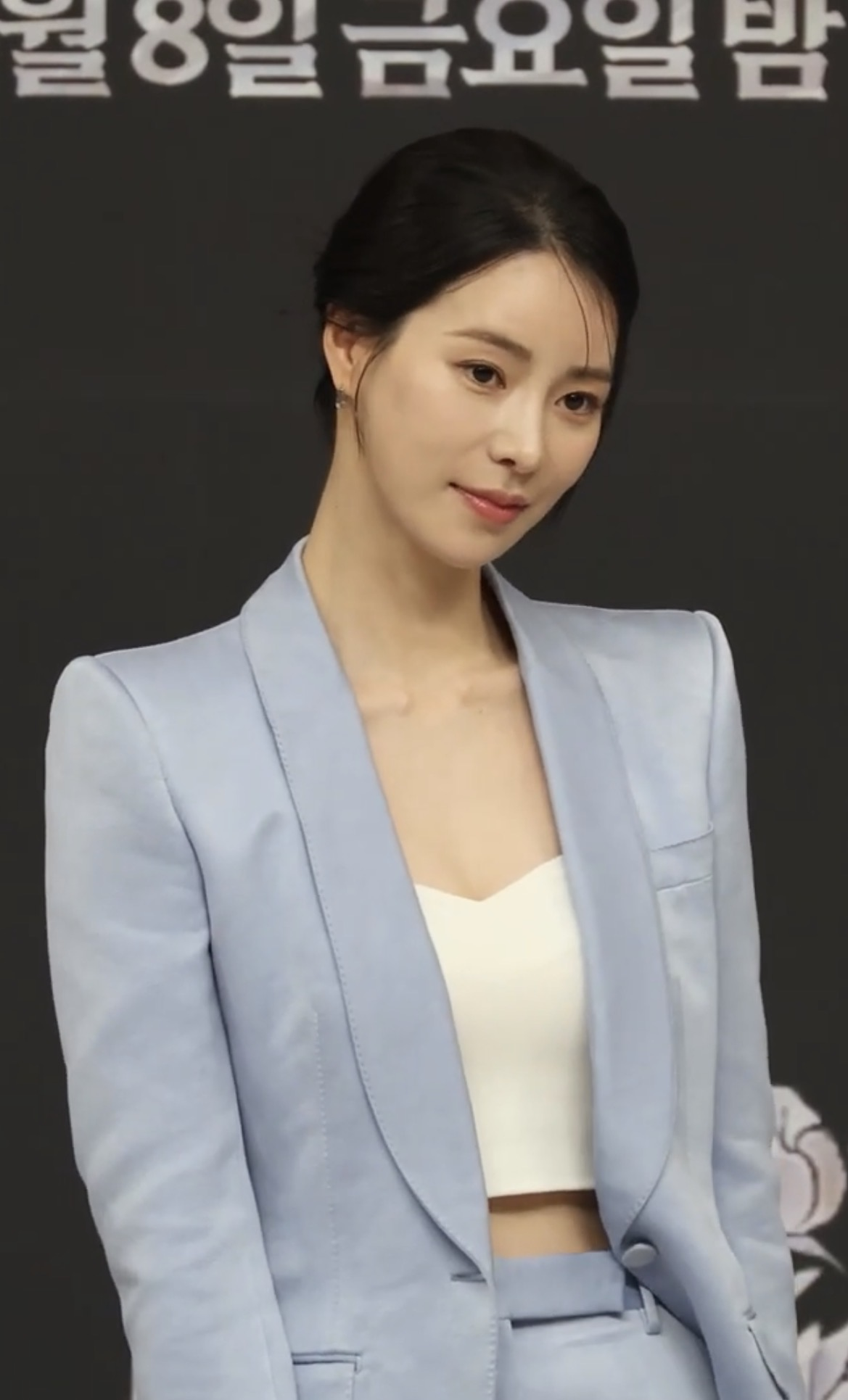
- Lim in May 2026
- Born: June 23, 1990 (age 36); Seoul, South Korea
- Education: Korea National University of Arts (BFA in Acting)
- Occupation: Actress
- Years active: 2011–present
- Agent: Artist Company

Korean name
- Hangul: 임지연
- Hanja: 林智妍
- RR: Im Jiyeon
- MR: Im Chiyŏn

Signature
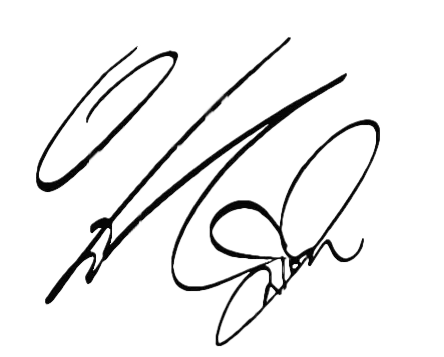

Lim Ji-yeon (Korean: 임지연; born June 23, 1990) is a South Korean actress. After appearing in a number of short films and plays, she had her first feature film role in Obsessed (2014). The role earned her Best New Actress nominations at the 35th Blue Dragon Film Awards and 51st Baeksang Arts Awards, and wins at the 51st Grand Bell Awards and 23rd Buil Film Awards. She gained international acclaim with the Netflix hit series The Glory (2022–2023), for which she received the Baeksang Arts Award for Best Supporting Actress, among other accolades. Lim subsequently starred in the mystery thriller Lies Hidden in My Garden (2023), action film Revolver (2024), historical drama The Tale of Lady Ok (2024–2025), and romantic comedy My Royal Nemesis (2026).

== Early life and education ==
Lim dreamed of becoming an actress after watching the musical Cats as a child. Due to her parents concerns, she studied humanities in high school. Eventually, she entered the Korea National University of Arts, where she majored in acting and started walking the path of an actress after persuading her parents. Lim was part of the Class of 2009 in the Department of Acting, alongside classmates such as Byun Yo-han, Suho, and Park Jeong-min.

== Career ==
=== 2011–2021: Beginnings and wider recognition ===
Lim debuted in 2011 through the short film Dear Catastrophe. She also appeared in other short films such as When September Ends in 2013. In 2013, while still a student, Lim was cast in the erotic romance film Obsessed directed by Kim Dae-woo. The film was released in 2014, and her performance as Jong Ga-heun earned her Best New Actress accolades from the prestigious Blue Dragon Film Awards, Grand Bell Awards, Buil Film Awards and Baeksang Arts Awards.

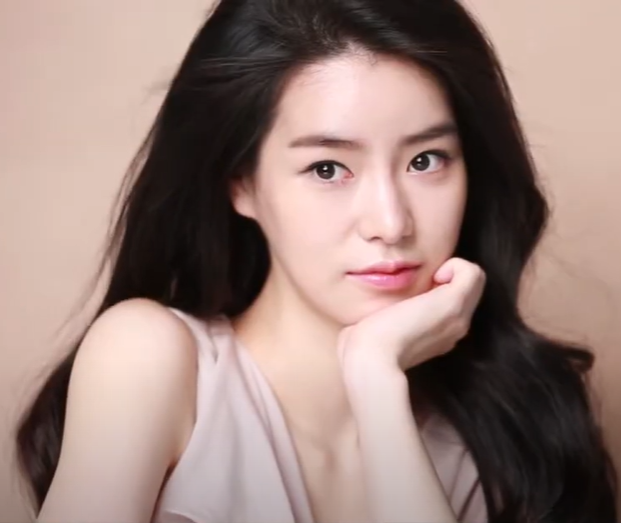
Lim during a photoshoot in 2015

In 2015, Lim took on the role of ambitious concubine Dan-hee in period drama film The Treacherous directed by Min Kyu-dong. In June 2015, she made her small screen debut as Lee Ji-yi in High Society. The bubbly and lovable character brought her the New Star Award at the SBS Drama Awards, and the Best New Actress at the Korea Drama Awards. During this period, she also hosted the MBC entertainment news program Section TV and the 2015 SBS Drama Awards. The same year, she won the Excellence Award in the Music/Talk Category at the MBC Entertainment Awards.

In the first half of 2016, Lim appeared in historical drama The Royal Gambler as Dam-seo, a sword-wielding noblewoman bent on revenge. She made a cameo appearance in the hit series The Doctors because of her close relationship with writer Ha Myung-hee, whom she previously worked with High Society. Later that year, she starred in comedy film Luck Key directed by Lee Gae-byok. From August 2016 to February 2017, Lim starred in weekend drama Blow Breeze as a cheerful and positive North Korean defector living in South Korea. For her role as Kim Mi-poong, she won the Excellence Award, Actress in a Serial Drama at the MBC Drama Awards.

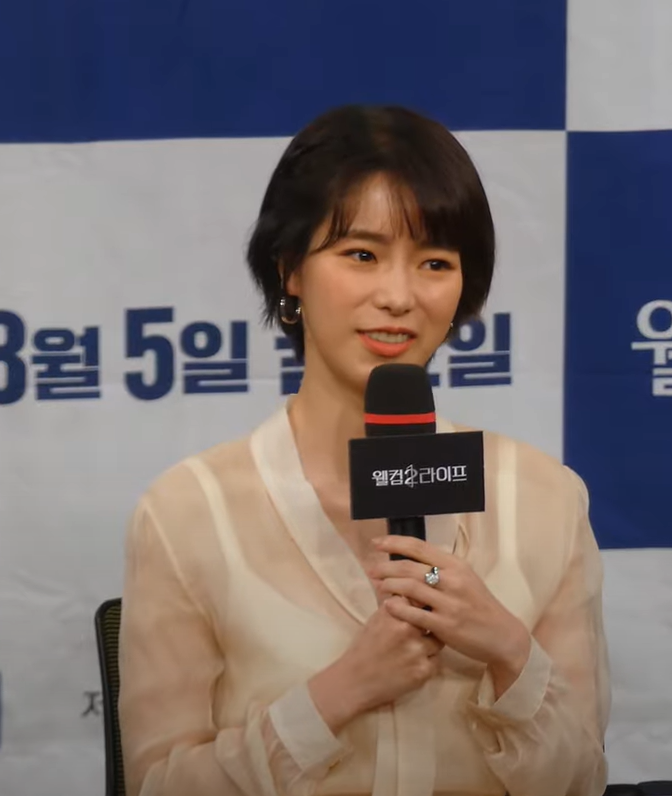
Lim during the Welcome 2 Life press conference in August 2019

In 2019, Lim returned to the small screen in Welcome 2 Life, a fantasy romantic comedy about a skilled lawyer who enters a parallel world due to an unfortunate accident. She received the Top Excellence Award, Actress in a Monday-Tuesday Miniseries at the MBC Drama Awards for this performance. She then starred as Young-mi in crime film Tazza: One Eyed Jack.

In May 2020, Lim signed with the Artist Company.

In 2021, the character Moon Jin-ah in action fantasy film Spiritwalker brought her a Best Supporting Actress nod at the Grand Bell Awards. The web series The Magic, which Lim had filmed in 2017, was released through OTT media service Seezn in 2021 as well.

=== 2022–present: Rise in popularity and critical acclaim ===
In 2022, Lim took on the role of Ji-na in the web series Rose Mansion, alongside Yoon Kyun-sang. In December the same year, she appeared in Part 2 of Netflix's original series Money Heist: Korea – Joint Economic Area where she played the role of Seoul, a character that was not in the original work.

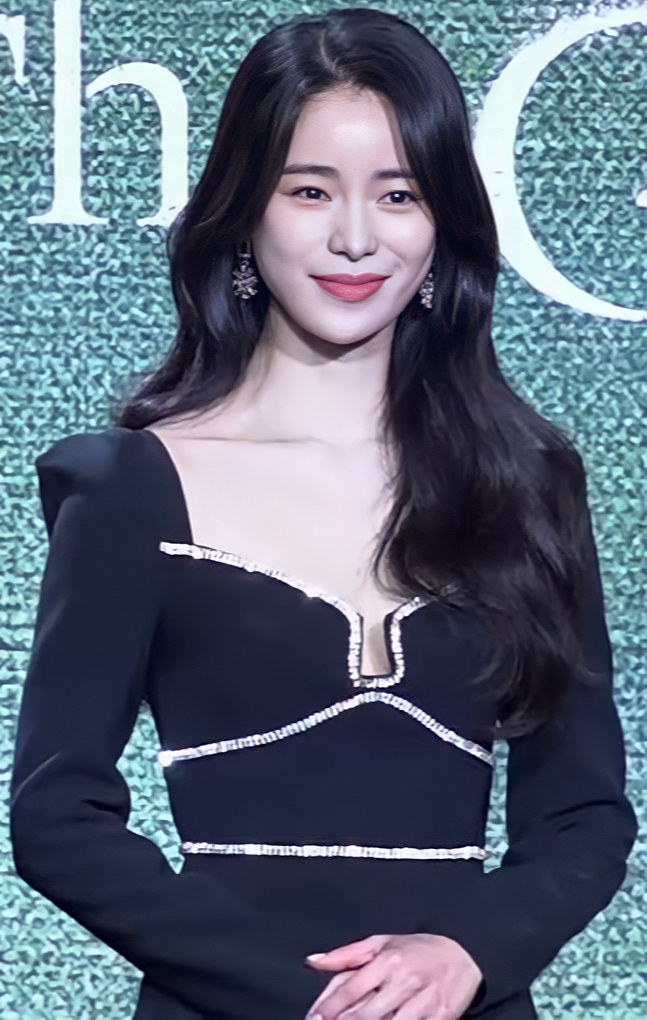
Lim during The Glory press conference in December 2022

At the end of 2022, Lim challenged her first villain role in Netflix's original series The Glory, where she played the role of Park Yeon-jin, a weather presenter who had led a group of delinquents in bullying and physically abusing the protagonist during high school. The Glory was a hit with audiences and well-received among critics; Lim's portrayal was met with favorable reviews, being described as her life's character, and earning her Best Supporting Actress wins at the Baeksang Arts Awards and Blue Dragon Series Awards.

In June 2023, she starred alongside Kim Tae-hee in mystery thriller Lies Hidden in My Garden. Her performance as a domestic violence victim was commended for being a 180° transformation from her previous role in The Glory. In particular, a viral scene showing Lim's character after the death of her husband was praised by critics for its depiction of liberation with a hint of madness. Her next project, crime drama The Killing Vote, premiered in August 2023.

In August 2023, Lim was selected by the Korean Film Directors Association at the 2023 Bechdel Day as Actor of the Year for her performance in The Glory and Lies Hidden in My Garden. Judges evaluated her performance in The Glory as not confining the character as just a "flat villainess" but carving a path of complex desires that had never been seen before in a villain. Regarding her acting in Lies Hidden in My Garden, it was noted that she showed the animalistic instinct of not wanting to let the child in her womb starve even in the moment of chilling revenge, convincingly proving the extreme temperature difference within one person. In April 2024, Lim received her first Best Actress nomination at the Baeksang Arts Awards for Lies Hidden in My Garden.

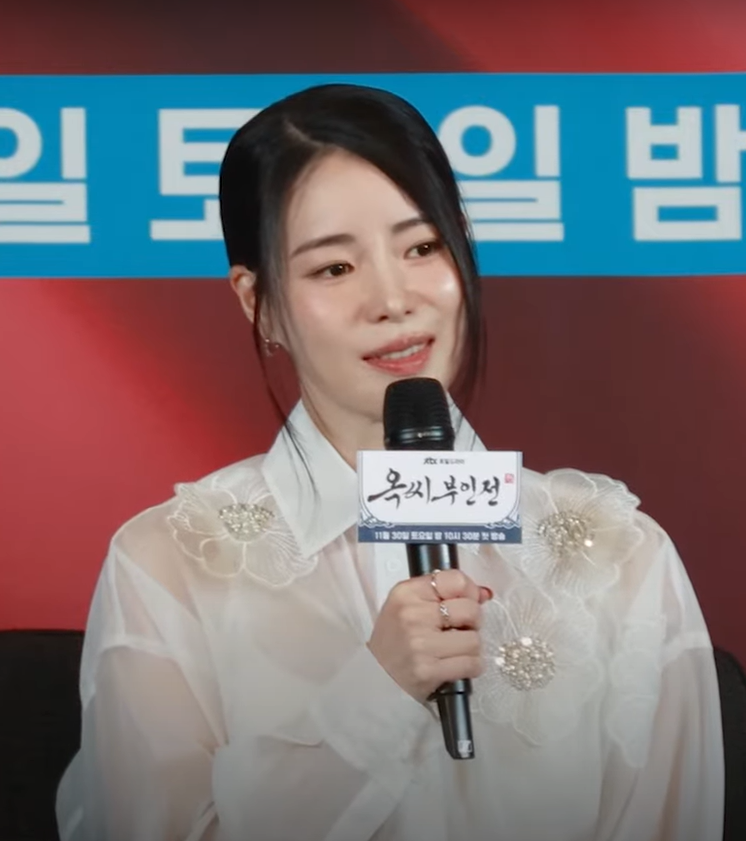
Lim during The Tale of Lady Ok press conference in November 2024

In the second half of 2024, her appearance as the mysterious Jeong Yoon-sun in action film Revolver, alongside Jeon Do-yeon and Ji Chang-wook, brought Lim a Best Supporting Actress win at the Buil Film Awards, and nominations at the Blue Dragon Film Awards and Baeksang Arts Awards. She was further honored as Best Actor at the London East Asia Film Festival. The committee cited that Lim showed off her charisma and deep acting in Revolver and delivered the most powerful and charming performance in East Asian film that year.

In November 2024, she headlined The Tale of Lady Ok, seven years since her last historical drama The Royal Gambler. Lim garnered positive reviews for her portrayal of Goo-deok, a runaway slave who disguised herself as noblewoman Ok Tae-young after the real Ok Tae-young died, with her character being described as "a strong and independent female lead" that captivated viewers.

In 2025, she starred in romantic comedy Nice to Not Meet You as a justice driven reporter, alongside Lee Jung-jae.

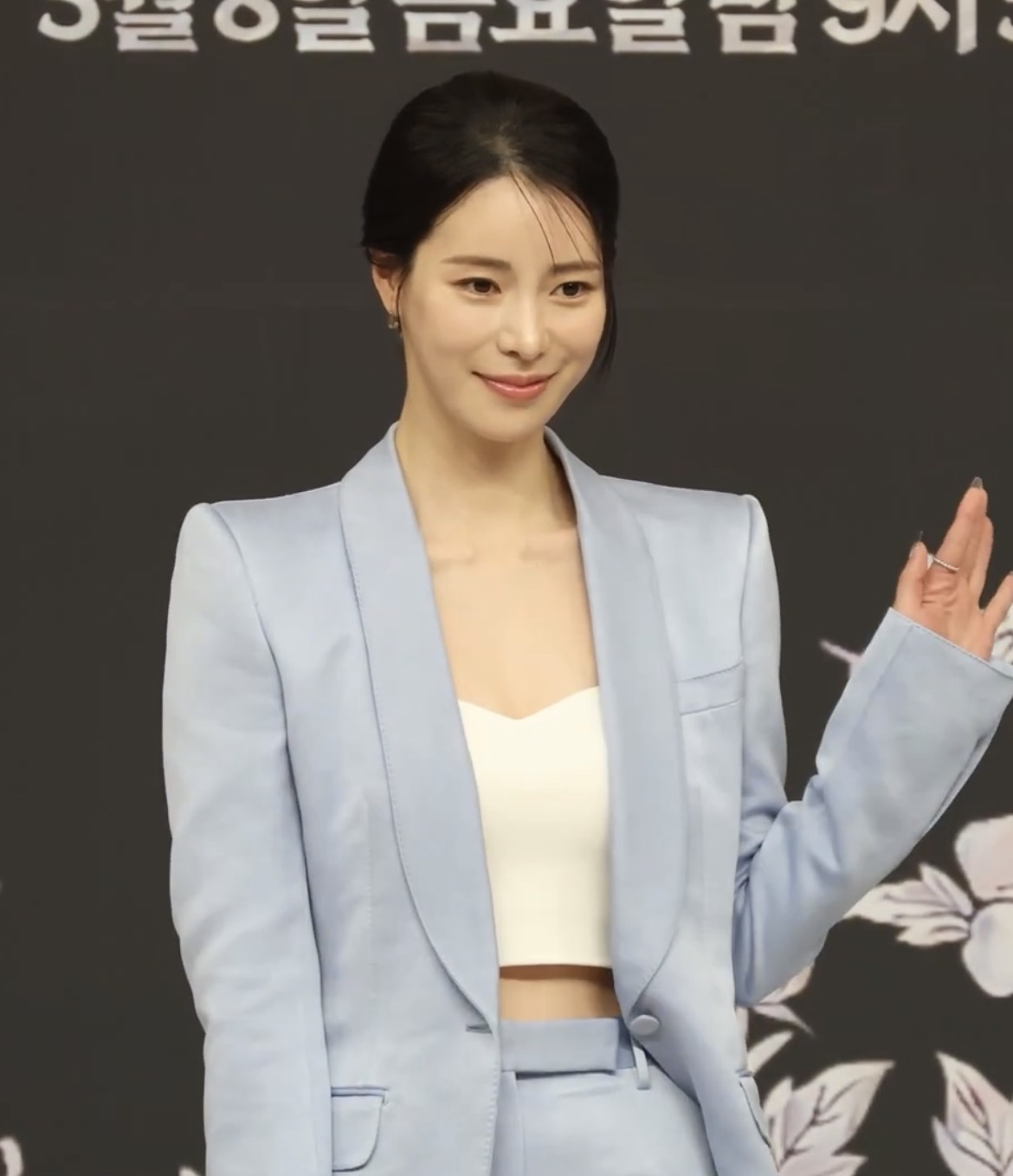
Lim during the My Royal Nemesis press conference in May 2026

In 2026, Lim took on the leading role in fantasy romantic comedy My Royal Nemesis, playing a notorious villainess from the Joseon dynasty who transmigrated to the modern era and possessed the body of an unknown actress. Lim’s dual portrayal of Kang Dan Shim/Shin Seori was met with praise by critics for balancing slapstick comedy, emotional depth and romantic tension without making the fantasy setup feel exaggerated or cartoonish. Her effort for distinguishing the two characters through variations in speech, vocal delivery, expressions, and mannerisms was further commended for allowing viewers to perceive them as distinct individuals.

== Public image ==
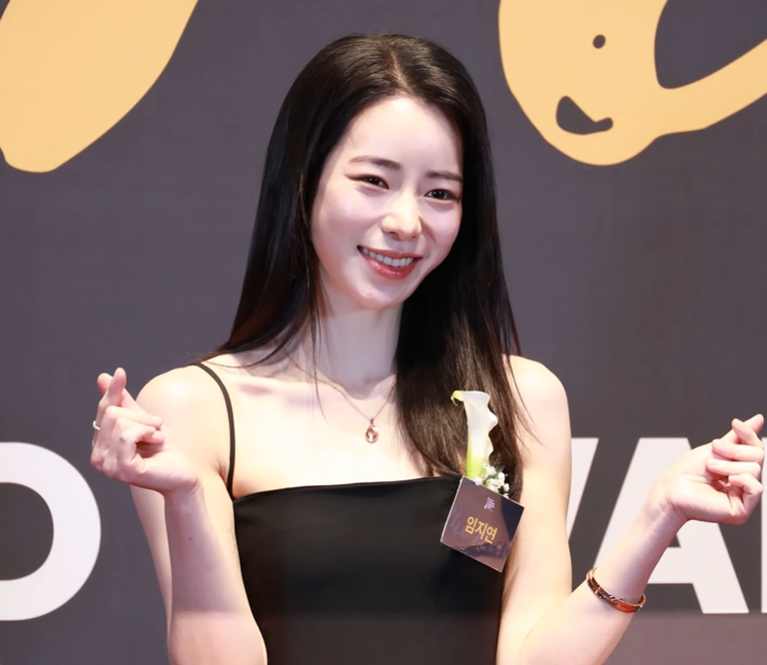
Lim during First Brand Awards 2024

Critics and commentators have described Lim as a versatile actress known for her commanding screen presence and ability to move between comedy, romance, historical drama, and villainous roles while bringing emotional authenticity to complex characters. Several writers have also highlighted her tendency to avoid typecasting by continually reinventing her screen image and challenging audience expectations with diverse role choices.

== Other ventures ==
=== Ambassadorship ===
On May 30, 2023, Lim was appointed as an honorary police officer for the Seodaemun District Police Agency in Seoul; she would be publicizing major police legislation, various security activities, and drug crime prevention for the next two years.

=== Endorsements ===
In August 2014, Amorepacific's Hanyul cosmetics selected Lim as their model, explaining that, "her charm, in which Eastern elegance and modern beauty coexist, aligns well with our brand concept of pursuing Korean beauty".

In February 2024, she was announced as the new brand ambassador for Spanish luxury fashion brand Loewe.

In July 2025, she was chosen as the first ambassador of the Culture Voyage x Ambassador program to commemorate the 40th anniversary of Hansung Motor, the official dealer of Mercedes-Benz. Mercedes-Maybach S 580 vehicle was presented to Lim during the event.

== Personal life ==
=== Relationship ===
On April 1, 2023, Artist Company confirmed that Lim is dating actor Lee Do-hyun, whom she met while filming The Glory.

=== Activism and philanthropy ===
In July 2023, Lim donated ₩10 million (~$6,500) to help support the construction of South Korea's first ALS care hospital.

She was one of the celebrities who donated their items to an auction in October 2024. All proceeds were used to support children and adolescents from low-income and vulnerable households in South Korea, as well as communities vulnerable to the climate crisis.

In March 2025, Lim quietly donated ₩50 million (~$33,000) to support recovery efforts from wildfire damage in South Korea.

== Filmography ==
=== Film ===
Year	Title	Role	Notes	Ref.
2011	Dear Catastrophe		Short film	
2012	Poker Face Girl		Short film	
2013	Just You		Short film	
2013	When September Ends		Short film	
2014	Obsessed	Jong Ga-heun		
2014	Romance in Seoul			
2015	The Treacherous	Dan-hee		
2016	Luck Key	Eun-joo		
2019	Tazza: One Eyed Jack	Young-mi		
2021	Spiritwalker	Moon Jin-ah		
2024	Revolver	Jeong Yoon-sun		

=== Television series ===
Key
†	Denotes television productions that have not yet been released

Year	Title	Role	Notes	Ref.
2015	High Society	Lee Ji-yi		
2016	The Royal Gambler	Dam-seo		
2016	The Doctors	Lee Soo-jung	Cameo (Ep. 7–8)	
2016	Blow Breeze	Kim Mi-poong		
2019	Welcome 2 Life	Ra Si-on		
2022	Money Heist: Korea – Joint Economic Area	Seoul	Part 2	
2022–2023	The Glory	Park Yeon-jin		
2023	Lies Hidden in My Garden	Chu Sang-eun		
2023	The Killing Vote	Joo Hyeon		
2024–2025	The Tale of Lady Ok	Goo-deok / Ok Tae-yeong		
2025	Nice to Not Meet You	Wi Jung-shin		
2026	My Royal Nemesis	Shin Seo-ri / Kang Dan-sim		
TBA	Alike †	Lee Eun-seok		

=== Web series ===
Year	Title	Role	Ref.
2021	The Magic	So Joong-hee	
2022	Rose Mansion	Ji-na	

=== Television shows ===
Year	Title	Role	Notes	Ref.
2015	Section TV	Host		
2021	Son Hyun-joo's Simple Station	Cast member	with Son Hyun-joo and Kim Jun-hyun	
2022	Besties in Wonderland	Cast member		
2025	Fresh off The Sea 2	Cast member		

=== Hosting ===
Year	Title	Notes	Ref.
2015	2015 SBS Drama Awards	with Yoo Jun-sang and Lee Hwi-jae	
2018	Bucheon International Fantastic Film Festival	with Choi Min-ho	
2019	4th Asia Artist Awards	with Leeteuk, Ahn Hyo-seop and Nancy	

== Accolades ==
=== Awards and nominations ===
Name of the award ceremony, year presented, category, nominee of the award, and the result of the nomination
Award ceremony	Year	Category	Nominee / Work	Result	Ref.
APAN Star Awards	2015	Best New Actress	High Society	Won	
Asia Artist Awards	2019	AAA Best Emotive (Actor)	Lim Ji-yeon	Won	
Asia Contents Awards & Global OTT Awards	2023	Best Supporting Actress	The Glory	Won	
Asia Model Awards	2019	Korean Model Star	Lim Ji-yeon	Won	
Asian Academy Creative Awards	2023	Best Actress in a Supporting Role (Grand Final Winners)	The Glory	Won	
Asian Academy Creative Awards	2023	Best Actress in a Supporting Role (National Winners – Korea)	The Glory	Won	
Asian Film Awards	2025	Best Supporting Actress	Revolver	Nominated	
Baeksang Arts Awards	2015	Best New Actress – Film	Obsessed	Nominated	
Baeksang Arts Awards	2023	Best Supporting Actress – Television	The Glory	Won	
Baeksang Arts Awards	2024	Best Actress – Television	Lies Hidden in My Garden	Nominated	
Baeksang Arts Awards	2025	Best Supporting Actress – Film	Revolver	Nominated	
Bechdel Day	2023	Actor of the Year	The Glory and Lies Hidden in My Garden	Won	
Blue Dragon Film Awards	2014	Best New Actress	Obsessed	Nominated	
Blue Dragon Film Awards	2024	Best Supporting Actress	Revolver	Nominated	
Blue Dragon Film Awards	2024	Popular Star Award	Lim Ji-yeon	Won	
Blue Dragon Series Awards	2023	Best Supporting Actress	The Glory	Won	
Brand of the Year Awards	2023	Best Actress – OTT	The Glory	Won	
Brand of the Year Awards	2026	Best Actress (Drama)	My Royal Nemesis	Won	
Buil Film Awards	2014	Best New Actress	Obsessed	Won	
Buil Film Awards	2024	Best Supporting Actress	Revolver	Won	
Elle Style Awards	2024	Most Wanted	Lim Ji-yeon	Won	
Grand Bell Awards	2014	Best New Actress	Obsessed	Won	
Grand Bell Awards	2022	Best Supporting Actress	Spiritwalker	Nominated	
Kinolights Awards	2023	Best Actress	The Glory	Won	
Korea Drama Awards	2015	Best New Actress	High Society	Won	
Korea Drama Awards	2025	Top Excellence Award, Actress	The Tale of Lady Ok	Nominated	
Korea First Brand Awards	2024	Best Actress – Drama (Vietnam)	Lim Ji-yeon	Won	
Korean Association of Film Critics Awards	2014	Best New Actress	Obsessed	Won	
Korean Film Actors' Guild Awards	2015	Best New Actress	Obsessed	Won	
London East Asia Film Festival	2024	Best Actor	Revolver	Won	
Max Movie Awards	2015	Best New Actress	Obsessed	Nominated	
MBC Drama Awards	2016	Excellence Award, Actress in a Serial Drama	Blow Breeze	Won	
MBC Drama Awards	2019	Grand Prize (Daesang)	Welcome 2 Life	Nominated	
MBC Drama Awards	2019	Top Excellence Award, Actress in a Monday-Tuesday Miniseries	Welcome 2 Life	Won	
MBC Drama Awards	2019	Best Couple Award	Lim Ji-yeon (with Jung Ji-hoon) for Welcome 2 Life	Nominated	
MBC Entertainment Awards	2015	Excellence Award in the Music/Talk Category	Section TV	Won	
SBS Drama Awards	2015	New Star Award	High Society	Won	
SBS Drama Awards	2023	Top Excellence Award, Actress in a Miniseries Genre/Action Drama	The Killing Vote	Nominated	
Seoul International Drama Awards	2026	Best Actress	My Royal Nemesis	Won	
Korean Popular Culture and Arts Awards	2026	Minister of Culture, Sports and Tourism Commendation	Lim Ji-Yeon	Won	

=== Listicles ===
Name of publisher, year listed, name of listicle, and placement
Publisher	Year	Listicle	Placement	Ref.
Cine21	2025	Female actors who delivered standout performances in 2024	4th	
Forbes	2024	Korea Power Celebrity 40	33rd	
Gallup Korea	2023	Television Actor of the Year	18th (Note: Lim Ji-yeon tied with Han So-hee and Kim Tae-ri (above 1.3%).)	
