= Whale Star: The Gyeongseong Mermaid =

South Korean webtoon

고래별 RR: Goraebyeol MR: Koraebyŏl
- Genre: Romance, Drama
- Author: Na Yoonhee
- Webtoon service: Naver Webtoon (Korean); Line Webtoon, Ize press (Print) (English)
- Original run: June 21, 2019 – July 8, 2021
- Volumes: 6

Whale Star: The Gyeongseong Mermaid (Korean: 고래별) is a South Korean manhwa released as a webtoon written and illustrated by Na Yoonhee. It was serialized via Naver Corporation's webtoon platform, Naver Webtoon, from June 2019 to July 2021, with the individual chapters collected and published into 6 volumes. The manhwa has been published in English by Line Webtoon. A live-action adaptation series has been announced and producing from the series. The historical background of this cartoon is the Japanese colonial period. It's published every Friday. The meaning of 'Goraebyeol' is an interpretation of "鯨星 kyunsung/ whale /star".

The story is loosely inspired by Andersen's The Little Mermaid with the chapters named after key turning points of the original tale.

== Plot summary ==
In 1926, Joseon (Korea) is under Japanese colonial rule. The main character, a 17-year-old girl named Su-a, works as a maid in the house of a large pro-Japanese landowner in Gunsan, Jeollabuk-do. One day, Su-a finds Uihyeon, an independence activist, lying injured on the beach and she secretly takes care of him...through this encounter her life changes drastically as she is exposed to love between people, and the love between a person and their home country.

== Media ==
=== Manhwa ===
Na Yoonhee launched Whale Star: The Gyeongseong Mermaid in Naver's webtoon platform Naver Webtoon on June 21, 2019.

==== Volume list ====
| No. | Korean release date | Korean ISBN |
|---|---|---|
| 1 | August 12, 2020 | 978-8-92-559005-9 |
| 2 | November 19, 2020 | 978-8-92-558950-3 |
| 3 | February 28, 2021 | 978-8-92-558909-1 |
| 4 | July 16, 2021 | 978-8-92-557996-2 |
| 5 | July 16, 2021 | 978-8-92-557995-5 |
| 6 | January 15, 2022 | 978-8-92-557899-6 |

=== Other media ===
The series was featured on the South Korean reality music show Webtoon Singer, premiered on the streaming service TVING on February 17, 2023, which featured K-pop artists' performances combining webtoons with extended reality technology. It is also making an audio webtoon on the website.
