= Byun Young-joo =

South Korean film director (born 1966)

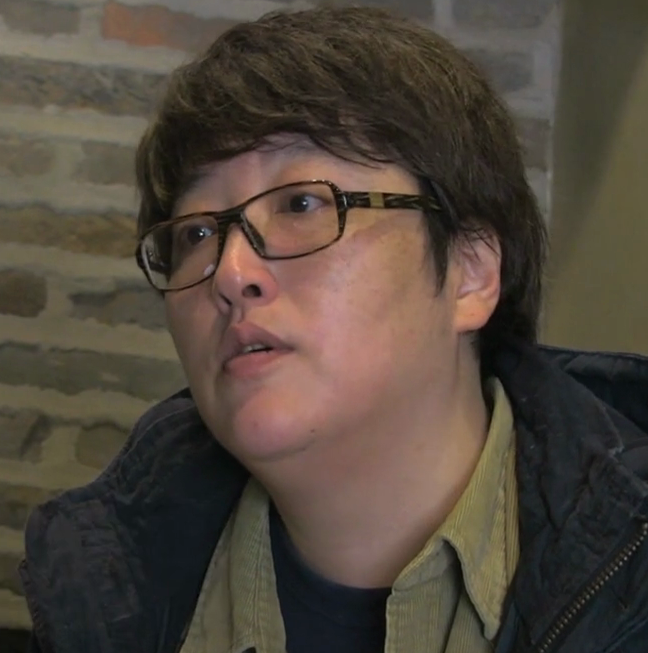
- Byun in 2014
- Born: December 20, 1966 (age 59); South Korea
- Education: Ewha Womans University - Law; Chung-Ang University Graduate School of Advanced Imaging Science, Multimedia and Film
- Occupations: Film and television director
- Years active: 1989 to present

Korean name
- Hangul: 변영주
- Hanja: 邊永姝
- RR: Byeon Yeongju
- MR: Pyŏn Yŏngju

Byun Young-joo (Korean: 변영주; born December 20, 1966) is a South Korean film and television director. Her films explore issues of women's rights and human rights.

== Education ==
Byun Young-joo graduated with a law degree from Ewha Womans University and did her graduate studies at the Department of Theater and Film at Chung-Ang University.

== Career ==
=== Beginning ===
She is a founding member of the women's feminist film collective "Bariteo," which was established in 1989. She worked as a cinematographer on Even Little Grass Has Its Own Name (Kim So-young, 1989), a short film about gender discrimination at work, and My Children (Doe Sung-hee, 1990), a documentary film about childcare in a poor neighborhood. Her first documentary Women Being in Asia (1993) centers on the sex trade in Asia, particularly the sex tourism of Jeju Island.

Byun is best known for her trilogy documenting the present and past lives of "comfort women" who were abducted and forced into sexual servitude by the Japanese army in World War II. Byun's efforts have lent a significant push to the women's demands for a formal apology and compensation from the Japanese government. At the same time, the films have drawn praise for their aesthetic and emotional power.

The first film in this series, entitled The Murmuring (1995), has become one of the most acclaimed documentaries in Korea's history, the first of its kind to receive a theater release in the country. Byun states that when she first contacted a group of comfort women and asked if she could film them, they refused emphatically. It was only after living together with them for one year that the director gained their trust and permission to make a film. This first documentary portrays the women leading their weekly protests at the Japanese embassy and fighting to overcome the sense of shame that has been planted within them and reinforced by an uncaring public.

Habitual Sadness (1997) was initiated at the request of the women, who asked that Byun film the last days of a group member who had been diagnosed with cancer. In this film the women are seen gaining self-confidence, eventually moving behind the camera themselves to utilize the medium of film as a means of both protest and healing. In the final chapter My Own Breathing (1999), a new character is introduced, a woman who was taken forcibly into service at 14 years old. As heart-rending as the accounts of forced prostitution may be, by focusing on their present, Byun filmed details that reveal the humor and personality of these women who survive years after the wreckage of their youth. In this manner the documentaries lead the audience to see the crimes as much more than tragic abstractions, but instead witness the effect it has had on these women's lives.

In Documentary of Yang Joo-nam (1998), Byun chose the director/editor (Sweet Dream: Lullaby of Death, A Mother's Love) as her subject. Yang was active in Korean cinema in the late 1930s until the late 1960s, but had lived in seclusion since then.

=== Feature film debut and other works ===
For her feature film debut, Byun adapted the Korean novel "A Special Day That Comes Only Once in My Life" by Jeon Gyeong-rin into the erotic drama Ardor (2002), about the reinvigorating effects of an affair on a woman's previously disenchanting life.

She then produced the documentary Koryu: Southern Women, South Korea (Kim So-young, 2001), which deals with feminine modes of expression and existence in both pre-modern and modern Korea, to construct a complex and multiple portrait of women's lives as diasporic, or "koryu": temporary living in an alien land - women living in man's land. Byun was also credited as one of the cinematographers for the documentary Repatriation (Kim Dong-won, 2004), which follows two North Korean political prisoners and their decade-long struggle to return home after their release.

Her sophomore feature effort Flying Boys (2004) is a coming-of-age romance that also portrays the struggles of the lower classes and sexual minorities. Byun had her young actors take about two months of ballet classes so they could grasp the basics of the form.

Commissioned as part of Ten Ten, the 10th anniversary project of the International Women's Film Festival in Seoul, her documentary short film The Wise Way to Remember the 20th Century (2008) is a meditation on the writings of Park Wan-suh and her legacy on the 20th century, specifically its impact on Byun as a filmmaker and other women artists of the present generation.

Her most recent film Helpless (2012) is based on the Japanese novel All She Was Worth by Miyuki Miyabe, which pivots around a young woman who suddenly disappears just a few weeks before her wedding, but also talks about contemporary problems such as private loans, bankruptcy and credit rating. Byun won Best Director at the 2012 Baeksang Arts Awards and Women in Film Korea Awards, and at 2.4 million tickets sold, Helpless is her biggest box-office hit yet.

=== Series debut ===
In 2024, Byun made her debut as a television series director through MBC's 14-episode drama Black Out. Produced by Hidden Sequence and began the pre-production in 2021, Black Out was developed under the working title Snow White Must Die, which is based on the German novel of the same name by Nele Neuhaus. It was reported that writer Seo Joo-yeon and director Lee Kyu-man would team up. Byun replaced Lee Kyu-man, who left the project while it was still being developed. Black Out had a world premiere in the Rendez-Vous section of the 2024 Canneseries and aired on MBC's Friday-Saturday prime time slot from August 16 to October 4, 2024.

For her next project, Byun directed eight-episode SBS drama The Mantis: Original Sin, which is an adaptation of the 2017 TF1 six-episode miniseries La Mante. It was adapted Lee Young-jong from on the 2017 TF1 series La Mante. Lead roles were portrayed by Go Hyun-jung and Jang Dong-yoon. It aired on SBS TV from September 5, to September 27, 2025, every Friday and Saturday at 21:50 (KST) and also available for streaming in Netflix.

== Filmography ==
=== Film ===
Year	Title	Role	Notes	Ref.
1993	Women Being in Asia	Director	documentary	
1995	The Murmuring	Director	documentary	
1997	Habitual Sadness	Director	documentary	
1998	Documentary of Yang Joo-nam	Director	documentary	
1999	My Own Breathing	Director	documentary	
2002	Ardor	Director		
2004	Flying Boys	Director		
2008	The Wise Way to Remember the 20th Century	Director	documentary short	
2012	Helpless	Director		

=== Series ===
Year	Title	Role	Notes	Ref.
2024	Black Out	Director	MBC drama	
2025	Queen Mantis	Director	SBS drama	

== Awards and nominations ==
Name of the award ceremony, year presented, category, nominee of the award, and the result of the nomination
Award ceremony	Year	Category	Nominee / Work	Result	Ref.
Baeksang Arts Awards	2012	Best Director	Helpless	Won	
Busan International Film Festival	1999	Woonpa Fund	My Own Breathing	Won	
Korean Council for the Women Drafted for Military Sexual Slavery by Japan	2009	Kim Hak-sun Award	—N/a	Won	
Korean Film Critics Association	1996	Film Critics Special Award	The Murmuring	Won	
Taiwan International Documentary Festival	1998	Merit Prize	Habitual Sadness	Won	
Women in Film Korea Awards	2012	Filmmaker of the Year	Helpless	Won	
Yamagata International Documentary Film Festival	1995	Shinsuke Ogawa Award	The Murmuring	Won	
