= 2025 SBS Drama Awards =

33rd edition of award ceremony

- Official poster
- Date: December 31, 2025
- Site: SBS Prism Tower, Sangam-dong, Mapo-gu, Seoul
- Hosted by: Shin Dong-yup; Chae Won-bin; Heo Nam-jun
- Produced by: Jang Seok-jin
- Official website: SBS Awards

Highlights
- Grand Prize (Daesang): Lee Je-hoon – Taxi Driver 3

Television coverage
- Network: SBS
- Viewership: Ratings: 5.5%; Viewership: 1.196 million

The 2025 SBS Drama Awards, presented by Seoul Broadcasting System (SBS), was held on December 31, 2025, from 20:35 (KST) at the SBS Prism Tower in Sangam-dong, Mapo-gu, Seoul. The awards ceremonies in 2023 and 2024 were held on December 29 and December 21 respectively.

The show was hosted by Shin Dong-yup for the ninth consecutive time, together with Chae Won-bin and Heo Nam-jun.

== Winners and nominees ==
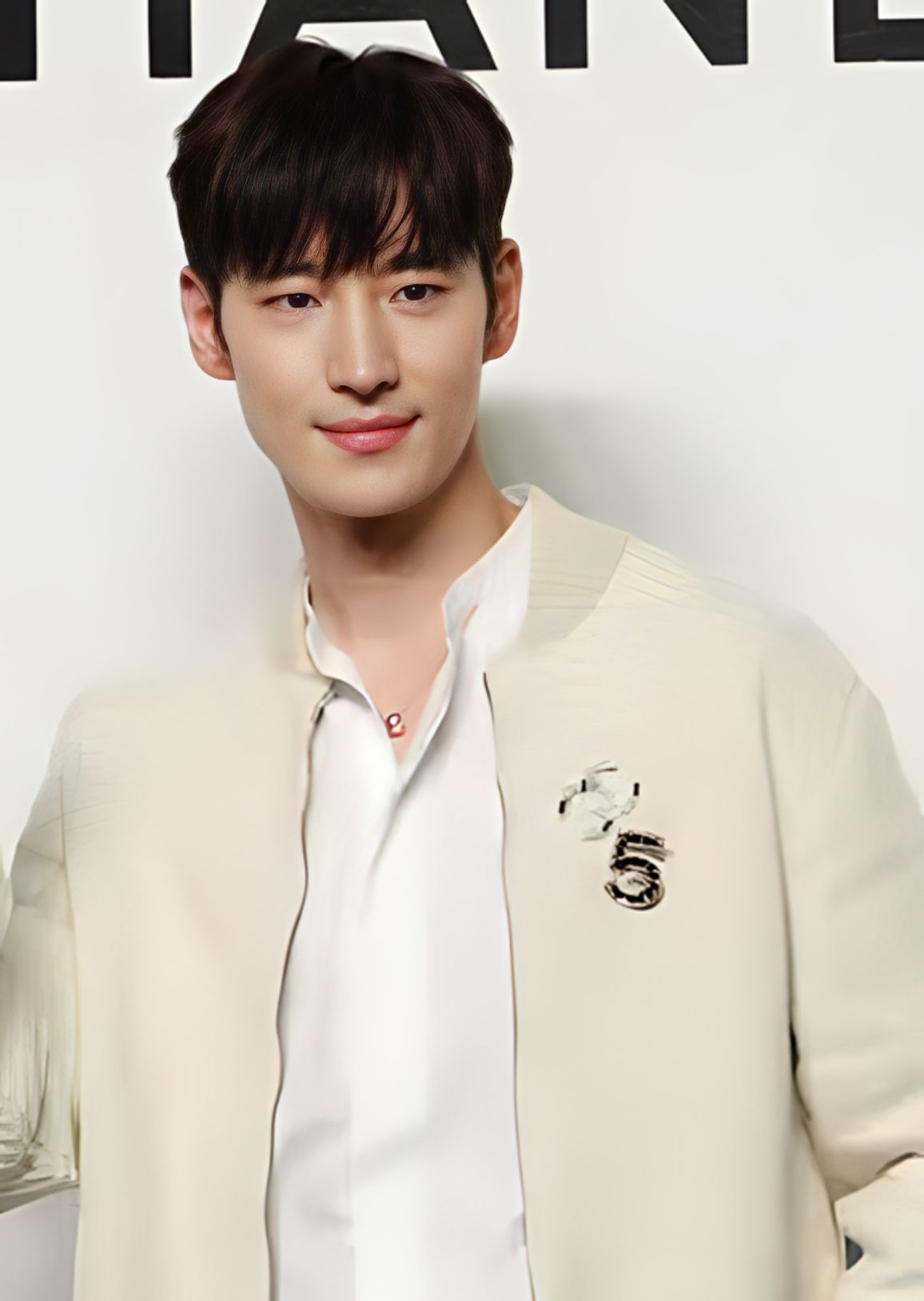
Lee Je-hoon, Grand Prize (Daesang) winner

Winners are listed first and denoted in bold.

List of Awards
Grand Prize (Daesang)	Director's Award
**Lee Je-hoon – Taxi Driver 3**	**Yoon Kye-sang – The Winning Try**
Top Excellence Award, Actor in a Miniseries Genre/Action Drama	Top Excellence Award, Actress in a Miniseries Genre/Action Drama
**Park Hyung-sik – Buried Hearts**	**Go Hyun-jung – Queen Mantis**
Top Excellence Award, Actor in a Romance/Comedy Drama	Top Excellence Award, Actress in a Romance/Comedy Drama
**Choi Woo-shik – Would You Marry Me?**	**Jung So-min – Would You Marry Me?**
Top Excellence Award, Actor in a Seasonal Drama	Top Excellence Award, Actress in a Seasonal Drama
**Lee Joon-hyuk – Love Scout**	**Han Ji-min – Love Scout**
Top Excellence Award, Actor in a Miniseries Humanity/Fantasy Drama	Top Excellence Award, Actress in a Miniseries Humanity/Fantasy Drama
**Yook Sung-jae – The Haunted Palace**	**Kim Ji-yeon – The Haunted Palace**
Achievement Award	Drama of the Year
**Lee Soon-jae**	**Taxi Driver 3**
Excellence Award, Actor in a Miniseries Genre/Action Drama	Excellence Award, Actress in a Miniseries Genre/Action Drama
**Jang Dong-yoon – Queen Mantis**	**Pyo Ye-jin – Taxi Driver 3**
Excellence Award, Actor in a Miniseries Romance/Comedy Drama	Excellence Award, Actress in a Romance/Comedy Drama
**Jang Ki-yong – Dynamite Kiss**	**Ahn Eun-jin – Dynamite Kiss**
Excellence Award, Actor in a Seasonal Drama	Excellence Award, Actress in a Seasonal Drama
**Kim Do-hoon – Love Scout**	**Jeon Yeo-been – Our Movie**
Excellence Award, Actor in a Miniseries Humanity/Fantasy Drama	Excellence Award, Actress in a Miniseries Humanity/Fantasy Drama
**Kim Yo-han – The Winning Try**; **Kim Ji-hoon – The Haunted Palace**	**Cha Chung-hwa – The Haunted Palace**
Best Supporting Actor in a Miniseries Humanity/Fantasy Drama	Best Supporting Actress in a Miniseries Humanity/Fantasy Drama
**Lee Sung-wook – The Winning Try**	**Gil Hae-yeon – The Haunted Palace & The Winning Try**
Best Supporting Actor in a Miniseries Genre/Action	Best Supporting Actress in a Miniseries Genre/Action
**Lee Hae-young – Buried Hearts**	**Han Dong-hee – Queen Mantis**
Best Supporting Actor in a Miniseries Romance/Comedy Drama	Best Supporting Actress in a Miniseries Romance/Comedy Drama
**Seo Bum-june – Would You Marry Me?**	**Shin Seul-ki – Would You Marry Me?**
Best Supporting Actor in a Miniseries Seasonal Drama	Best Supporting Actress in a Miniseries Seasonal Drama
**Go Geon-han – Love Scout**	**Lee Sang-hee – Love Scout**
Best New Actor	Best New Actress
**Kim Dan – The Winning Try**; **Kim Mu-jun – Dynamite Kiss**; **Cha Woo-min – Buried Hearts**; **Ha Yu-jun – Spring of Youth**	**Kim Eun-bi – Our Movie**; **Park Jung-yeon – The Winning Try**; **Woo Da-vi – Dynamite Kiss**; **Hong Hwa-yeon – Buried Hearts**
Best Supporting Team	Best Performance
**Hanyang High School rugby team – The Winning Try**	**Kim Eui-sung – Taxi Driver 3**
Best Couple Award	Scene Stealer Award
**Ahn Eun-jin and Jang Ki-yong – Dynamite Kiss**	**Yoon Shi-yoon – Taxi Driver 3**; **Seo Hye-won – Love Scout & Spring of Youth**

== Presenters ==
On December 29, the names of the award presenters were announced as follows:

- Kim Hye-yoon
- Lomon
- Yoo Yeon-seok
- Kim Ji-won
- Jang Na-ra
- Pyo Ji-hoon
- Ji Seung-hyun
- Ahn Bo-hyun
- Jung Eun-chae
- Kim Bum
- So Ji-sub
- Choi Dae-hoon
- Yoon Kyung-ho
- Kang Sang-joon
- Kim Shin-bi

== See also ==
- 2025 MBC Drama Awards
- 2025 KBS Drama Awards
