= Seire =

Seire may refer to:

- Seire (also spelled Seir, Seere, or Sear), a demon in the Ars Goetia
- Seire (세이레), a Korean tradition concerning the first 21 days of a newborn baby
- Seire, a 2021 South Korean film
