= The Legend of Kitchen Soldier =

2026 South Korean television series

- Promotional poster
- Hangul: 취사병 전설이 되다
- Lit.: Becoming a Cooking Soldier Legend
- RR: Chwisabyeong jeonseori doeda
- MR: Ch'wisabyŏng chŏnsŏri toeda
- Genre: Military comedy; Fantasy television
- Based on: Kitchen Soldier by J Robin
- Written by: Choi Ryong
- Directed by: Jo Nam-hyung
- Starring: Park Ji-hoon; Yoon Kyung-ho; Han Dong-hee; Lee Hong-nae; Lee Sang-yi
- Music by: Kim Joon-seok; Koo Bon-choon
- Country of origin: South Korea
- Original language: Korean
- No. of episodes: 12

Production
- Running time: 60 minutes
- Production companies: Studio Dragon; Studio N

Original release
- Network: TVING; tvN
- Release: May 11 – June 16, 2026

The Legend of Kitchen Soldier (Korean: 취사병 전설이 되다) is a 2026 South Korean military comedy fantasy television series written by Choi Ryong, directed by Jo Nam-hyung, and starring Park Ji-hoon, Yoon Kyung-ho, Han Dong-hee, Lee Hong-nae, and Lee Sang-yi. Based on the web novel Kitchen Soldier by J Robin, the series is about Kang Seong-jae, a young man from a poor background, who enlists in the military at 22 and unexpectedly rises to become a legendary cook. It was released on TVING from May 11, to June 16, 2026, and aired on tvN every Monday and Tuesday at 20:50 (KST). It is also available for streaming on Rakuten Viki and HBO Max in selected regions.

== Synopsis ==
After losing his father, Kang Seong-jae joins the army to escape his grief and is posted to Ganglim. He works with Sergeant First Class Park Jae-young, Lieutenant First Class Cho Ye-rin, and military cook Yoon Dong-hyeon. Though he was the top trainee at boot camp, his poor, single-parent background marks him for special observation. Because of his experience at his mother's food truck, Seong-jae is assigned as an assistant to Yoon Dong-hyeon, a veteran cook known for incompetence. One day, a mysterious virtual screen appears and gives him a mission: cook for the soldiers. The holographic figure then assigns him specific tasks. While serving, Seong-jae advances as a cook, earning praise from the staff. However, his missions soon lead him to uncover dangerous secrets possibly linked to his father's death.

== Cast and characters ==
The cast of The Legend of Kitchen Soldier (L to R): Park Ji-hoon, Yoon Kyung-ho, Han Dong-hee, Lee Hong-nae, and Lee Sang-yi

=== Main ===
- Park Ji-hoon as Kang Seong-jae

A 22-year-old private transferred to the Ganglim outpost, 4th Company, 1st Battalion, 60th Regiment, 29th Division. For his first birthday, he prophetically chose a chef's hat; this was his father's dream, an excellent cook, but not Seong-jae's. The family's difficult financial situation forced him to give up university and work on a construction site by day and as a shop assistant by night. This diligent life was shattered by his father's sudden death in an accident. Then came the draft notice: eighteen months that many others would avoid, but for him, it meant escaping the harsh realities of daily life and recovering. He gave his all during the months of basic training, earning him the title of best recruit. But his humble origins and his father's recent death led to him being classified as a "soldier requiring special attention." His superiors looked at him disapprovingly when, to make matters worse, he began to see strange things and hear voices, as if he were in a video game.

- Yoon Kyung-ho as Park Jae-young

A sergeant major and supply officer. He claims to have been a notorious gangster in Yeosu, but has no proof to back it up. Perhaps because of this, he lives freely even within the disciplined military. While all his comrades managed to get promoted, he remained a sergeant. He is a veteran administrative supply officer who defends the outpost in his own way despite several incidents and accidents (which have increased exponentially with the arrival of Private Kang Seong-jae). This leads him to constantly argue with Captain Hwang Seok-ho, who is much younger than him.

- Han Dong-hee as Cho Ye-rin

The post commander. A graduate of a women's university, she completed her military training in the ROTC (Reserve Officers' Training Corps), which in practice means being the ugly duckling of the officers. In truth, Ye-rin applied to the ROTC not with the intention of serving her country, but because it allowed her to earn money for tuition and gave her an advantage in employment. As the days passed in military life, the idea that this was a place unsuitable for her grew stronger. No matter how hard she tried not to be looked down upon by the soldiers, all she received in return was ridicule, and she realized she was becoming increasingly sensitive. When she was assigned to Ganglim, a sort of exile, all she had to do was kill time and quietly wait for her leave. That is, until the day she meets Kang Seong-jae, whom she initially greets with disapproval but then sees how capable he is of solving one problem after another.

- Lee Hong-nae as Yoon Dong-hyeon

The head cook at the Ganglim outpost. He takes his physical development more seriously than cooking, so he rarely eats the food he prepares himself. A complete novice in the art of cooking, and with a nearly atrophied sense of taste, a dark time has descended upon the base since he took charge of the soldiers' meals. But no soldier can complain about the food to a sergeant. With three months left in his active service, he passes the time counting down the days until a strange junior soldier arrives in Ganglim, casting a shadow over that final period.

- Lee Sang-yi as Captain Hwang Seok-ho

Head of the 4th Company. Although he always remained at the back of the class, he is incredibly good at stubbornly resisting without any qualms of conscience. He developed a sense of rivalry with his fellow cadet, Captain Lee Min-gu, starting from the day he was completely humiliated in front of the female cadet he was in love with. Despite his appearance, he has great pride; he pretends to be a great gourmet who has traveled to all corners of the world, and he especially despises food prepared by the soldiers. He enforces strict standards and doesn't hesitate to exploit the soldiers until he gets what he wants. However, due to memories of past events, he has an extreme fear of accidents happening. Therefore, he tries to prevent problems at all costs before they arise.

=== Supporting ===
==== Ganglim Outpost People ====
- Kang Ha-kyung as Corporal Kim Gwan-cheol, in charge of the second barracks; a soldier who is the real power at the Ganglim outpost.
- Lim Ji-ho as Tak Mun-ik

An administrative soldier at the Ganglim outpost and Kang Seong-jae's direct superior. Sitting in the administrative office allows him to quickly learn of rumors and gossip, making him the base's source of information. As the most educated person at the outpost, he is caught in a vicious cycle where everything is attributed to his academic background, for better or for worse. Upon joining the military, he felt his faith in humanity fading as he realized that people like those he encountered actually exist.

- Kang Jun-kyu as Joo Sang-wook

A supply corporal, who is a typical sociable person, popular with his superiors and subordinates due to his talkativeness. He claims to have worked for a telecommunications company outside the military, though it is later revealed that he was actually just a phone salesman.

- Lee Sang-jun as Cha Seung-woo

A sergeant and deputy platoon leader. Although a newcomer himself, he strives to appear tough in front of the soldiers. He complains about Sergeant Park Jae-young, whom everyone else avoids, but who becomes his only drinking buddy.

- Kim Mun-gi as Pyo Ji-yong

A soldier and troublemaker in Ganglim Outpost.

==== People from 1st Battalion Headquarters ====
- Jung Woong-in as Lieutenant Colonel Baek Chun-ik, commander of the 1st Battalion . He listens attentively to even the most trivial stories of his soldiers, while possessing a subtle charisma that instills tension in junior officers with his mere presence. But he has a humanist side; he loves home-cooked meals with seven side dishes that he shares with his family and seeks to strengthen the soldiers through food.
- Han Min as Captain Lee Min-gu, head of the logistics support section at the 1st Battalion headquarters and Lieutenant Colonel Baek Chun-ik's loyal right-hand man. He is an ambitious character who would do anything for a promotion.
- Lee Se-ho as Major Im Seung-bin

At the Korea Military Academy, Seung-bin was an unremarkable cadet. After his rapid promotion to Major, he became a high-profile officer but failed to realize that his rising fame also attracted more enemies.

- Park Seo-ri as HR Officer, Senior Manager Heo Ran-hee

==== Seong-jae's family ====
- Seo Jeong-yeon as Gong Su-yeon

Seong-jae's mother.

- Choi Deok-moon as Kang Il-yong

Seong-jae's father.

- Cho Yu-ha as Kang Eun-jae

Seong-jae's younger sister.

==== Others ====
- Jeon So-young as Jung Min-ah, with whom Seong-jae had a relationship before his enlistment and whom he meets again now, as she is a trainee reporter for the Korea Defense Daily.
- Jung Jae-sung as General Kim In-tae, head of the 29th division and a graduate of the Korean Military Academy, who highly values Kang Seong-jae's abilities and supports him unconditionally.
- Ahn Gil-kang as Bae Won-yeong

The commander of the 60th Regiment. With his imposing presence, he is the very image of a born soldier. He commands the stage with a straightforward personality that matches his image. However, he has a very discerning palate, which keeps the cooks at the Ganglim outpost on edge.

- Oh Seung-baek as Corporal Lee Ho-young, a culinary prodigy who works at a military officer's kitchen. He cooked duck confit served with an orange gastrique on the promotion day.

=== Special appearances ===
- Jin Goo as Ha Byung-dae, a Tteokbokki restaurant owner (Ep. 5)
- Ra Mi-ran as Jae-young's lover (Ep. 5)

== Production ==
=== Development ===
The series is based on the Naver webtoon Kitchen Soldier by J Robin. It is directed by Jo Nam-hyung, who co-helmed Tale of the Nine Tailed (2022) and Tale of the Nine Tailed 1938 (2023), written by Choi Ryong, who wrote Sorry Not Sorry (2024–2025), and co-produced by Studio Dragon and Studio N.

=== Casting ===
On February 6, 2025, Park Ji-hoon was reportedly being considered to star by his agency, YY Entertainment According to Newsen on February 12, Yoon Kyung-ho received an offer and was considering it, while Sports Kyunghyang stated that his casting had been confirmed. Three months later, SPOTV reported that Lee Sang-yi would make a special appearance. By July 2025, Park, Yoon, Han Dong-hee, and Lee Hong-nae were officially confirmed to lead the series, with Jung Woong-in joining the cast.

=== Filming ===
Principal photography commenced in July 2025 and wrapped up after 8 months.

== Release ==
The Legend of Kitchen Soldier is scheduled to premiere on TVING in the first half of 2026. In February 2026, the series has received an official invitation to '2026 Series Mania' in France, marking its global debut. By April 2026, the series was confirmed to premiere on TVING on May 11, and would also air simultaneously on tvN's Monday and Tuesday slot at 20:50 (KST). It is also available for streaming on Viki and HBO Max.

== Original soundtrack ==
=== Part 1 ===
Released on May 12, 2026
No.	Title	Lyrics	Music	Artist	Length
1.	"The Beginning of a Legend" (전설의 시작)	Jay Cuff; Lee Yoon-ji; RODA	Lee Yoon-ji; Koo Bonchoon; Koh Tae-young	Kangnam	2:57
2.	"The Beginning of a Legend" (전설의 시작; Inst.)		Lee Yoon-ji; Koo Bonchoon; Koh Tae-young		2:57
Total length:					5:54

=== Part 2 ===
Released on May 27, 2026
No.	Title	Lyrics	Music	Artist	Length
1.	"My Flavor"	PAPERMAKER (WWWAVE, QUDO, Kim Soo-ah, Wi Han-ah, ZUNGWOO, innig)	PAPERMAKER (WWWAVE, QUDO, Haedo)	MigakBoys	3:04
2.	"My Flavor" (Inst.)		PAPERMAKER (WWWAVE, QUDO, Haedo)		3:04
Total length:					6:08

=== Part 3 ===
Released on June 2, 2026
No.	Title	Lyrics	Music	Artist	Length
1.	"Sad Saltiness" (슬픈 짠맛)	Zayvo	Zayvo; HAE; Stally	An Yu-jin (Ive)	3:13
2.	"Sad Saltiness" (슬픈 짠맛; Inst.)		Zayvo; HAE; Stally		3:13
Total length:					6:26

=== Part 4 ===
Released on June 9, 2026
No.	Title	Lyrics	Music	Artist	Length
1.	"Too Far Away"	DINT	KZ; Kim Tae-young; Andreas Öhrn; Chris Wahle	Lee Sang-woong	3:19
2.	"Too Far Away" (Inst.)		KZ; Kim Tae-young; Andreas Öhrn; Chris Wahle		3:19
Total length:					6:38

== Viewership ==
The Legend of Kitchen Soldier : South Korea viewers per episode (millions)

Season	Episode number												Average
Season	1	2	3	4	5	6	7	8	9	10	11	12	Average
1	1.447	1.657	1.812	1.968	1.989	2.045	1.823	1.828	1.776	1.936	1.817	2.022	1.843

Source: Audience measurement performed nationwide by Nielsen Korea.

Average TV viewership ratings
Ep.	Original broadcast date	Average audience share (Nielsen Korea)	
Ep.	Original broadcast date	Nationwide	Seoul
1	May 11, 2026	5.847% (2nd)	6.181% (1st)
2	May 12, 2026	6.247% (2nd)	6.668% (2nd)
3	May 18, 2026	7.187% (2nd)	6.907% (2nd)
4	May 19, 2026	7.852% (2nd)	8.309% (1st)
5	May 25, 2026	7.906% (1st)	8.847% (1st)
6	May 26, 2026	7.323% (2nd)	7.827% (2nd)
7	June 1, 2026	7.200% (1st)	8.092% (1st)
8	June 2, 2026	7.012% (1st)	7.160% (1st)
9	June 8, 2026	7.093% (1st)	7.598% (1st)
10	June 9, 2026	7.343% (1st)	7.615% (1st)
11	June 15, 2026	7.098% (1st)	7.831% (1st)
12	June 16, 2026	7.618% (1st)	8.175% (1st)
Average		7.144%	7.601%
In the table above, the blue numbers represent the lowest ratings and the red numbers represent the highest ratings.; This drama aired on a cable channel/pay TV which normally has a relatively smaller audience compared to free-to-air TV/public broadcasters (KBS, SBS, MBC, and EBS).

== Accolades ==
=== Awards and nominations ===
Name of the award ceremony, year presented, category, nominee of the award, and the result of the nomination
Award ceremony	Year	Category	Nominee	Result	Ref.
Blue Dragon Series Awards	2026	Best Drama	The Legend of Kitchen Soldier	Won	
Blue Dragon Series Awards	2026	Best Actor	Park Ji-hoon	Nominated	
Blue Dragon Series Awards	2026	Best Supporting Actor	Yoon Kyung-ho	Won	
Blue Dragon Series Awards	2026	Best Supporting Actor	Lee Sang-yi	Nominated	
Blue Dragon Series Awards	2026	Best New Actor	Lee Hong-nae	Nominated	
Blue Dragon Series Awards	2026	OST Popularity Award	"Sad Saltiness" by An Yu-jin of Ive	Won	
Fundex Awards	2026	Best of OTT Original Drama	The Legend of Kitchen Soldier	Pending	
Fundex Awards	2026	Best Actor of OTT Original Drama	Park Ji-hoon	Pending	
Fundex Awards	2026	Best Supporting Actor of OTT Original Drama	Lee Sang-yi	Pending	
Fundex Awards	2026	Best Supporting Actor of OTT Original Drama	Lee Hong-nae	Pending	
Korea Drama Awards	2026	Best Drama	The Legend of Kitchen Soldier	Nominated	
Korea Drama Awards	2026	Excellence Award, Actor	Park Ji-hoon	Nominated	
Korea Drama Awards	2026	Rising Star Award	Park Ji-hoon	Won	
Korea Drama Awards	2026	Best New Actress	Jeon So-young (Note: Also won for If Wishes Could Kill)	Won	

=== Listicles ===
Name of publisher, year listed, name of listicle, and placement
Publisher	Year	Listicle	Placement	Ref.
Joy News 24	2026	Best Dramas of 2026	7th (Note: mentioned together with Four Hands, Two Sonatas and 100 Days of Deception)	
