= Ardor (film) =

2002 South Korean romantic film

- Theatrical poster
- Hangul: 밀애
- Hanja: 密愛
- RR: Mirae
- MR: Mirae
- Directed by: Byun Young-joo
- Written by: Byun Young-joo
- Produced by: Kim Mi-hee
- Starring: Yunjin Kim; Lee Jong-won; Gye Seong-yong
- Cinematography: Kwon Hyeok-jun
- Edited by: Park Gok-ji; Jeong Jin-hee
- Music by: Jo Yeong-wook; Choi Seung-hyun
- Distributed by: Cinema Service
- Release date: 8 November 2002
- Running time: 112 minutes
- Country: South Korea
- Language: Korean
- Box office: US$2,129,092

Ardor (Korean: 밀애; RR: Mirae), is a 2002 South Korean film directed by Byun Young-joo. It stars Yunjin Kim and is based on the novel A Special Day That Comes Only Once In My Life (내 생에 꼭 하루뿐일 특별한 날) by Jeon Gyeong-rin.

== Plot ==
A thirty-year-old housewife, Mi-heun, is visited by a woman in a red sweater. She smirks and tells Mi-heun that her husband is her lover. These few words take away and shatter Mi-heun's life as she knew it. The woman follows Mi-heun (the wife) into another room and hits her in the head with a blunt object. Mi-heun falls down and her head starts bleeding. Mi-heun had injury only on the surface and ends up getting a few stitches on the scalp.

Mi-heun and her family begin a new life at the country side as if nothing had happened. Her husband leaves his job (which he loved dearly) and runs a book store. However, the aftermath of that night still haunts Mi-heun with headaches as she vexatiously tries to vent out her heartache, alone. She cannot accept the fact that she has to move on as if nothing horrible ever happened. She ends up getting addicted to painkillers to subside her headache. Spending time with her daughter will be her only favourite thing to do.

In-gyu is a not-so-busy country town doctor who enjoys fishing in the nearby lake. The rest of his time is spent on fishing girls out for sex. His wife lives in the city. She knows and doesn't care about her husband's lifestyle.As the doctor is beginning to enjoy and is getting comfortable with his small-town life, he meets her.

As Mi-heun sits blankly under the blazing sun at a rest stop, a sharp voice comes to her like an alarm and awakes her. She refuses him with all her body and might, but at the same time, falls into him with her entire body and soul.

In-gyu gives Mi-heun an overwhelming answer to her question. When she felt like she was at the end of her ropes, she falls into a dangerous game of sex that would never allow for love. Unaware to herself, she starts to enjoy the lover's game more and more.

Mi-heun's husband wants to make a pond outside their new house. When the workers visit the house, Mi-heun goes to meet her lover and her husband ends up finding out about the affair. He blames Mi-heun for ruining all his efforts to keep the marriage intact.

As Mi-heun is walking through the heavy woods barefooted, she is found by her lover(the doctor). He takes her with him to his house. They both know that they can't marry each other even though they love each other because they will end up getting hurt. So they wonder... 'what now?' and the story continues.
