= Jon Kyongnin =

South Korean writer (born 1962)

- Born: 1962 (age 63–64)
- Citizenship: South Korean
- Education: Kyungnam University
- Writing career
- Language: Korean

Korean name
- Hangul: 전경린
- RR: Jeon Gyeongrin
- MR: Chŏn Kyŏngnin

Jon Kyongnin is a Korean author best known for her poetry on the theme of sexuality.

== Life ==
Jon Kyongnin was born in 1962 and earned her degree in German Literature from Kyungnam University in Changwon, South Gyeongsang Province, South Korea. She debuted in 1995 when her novella Desert Moon (Samagui dal) was chosen for the New Spring Literary Contest sponsored by The Dong-A Ilbo.

== Work ==
Women's sexuality is the central focus of Jon Kyongnin's works. Her narratives are structured to indirectly reveal the sexual problems concealed and suppressed by their narrators. Once in a Lifetime Day (Nae saenge kkok haruppunil tteukbyeolhan nal) is a tale of infidelity that expresses female psychology regarding sex and sexual desire with blunt honesty. Another characteristic of Jeon's novels is pessimism towards life. While maintaining a psychological distance from their difficult or mundane life, Jeon's characters obsess over changes. Novels such as Merry-Go-Round Circus Woman (Meri go raundeu seokeoseu yeoin) feature protagonists who tend to immerse themselves in dreamy and fantastic atmosphere without any particular goal in real life.

Social conventions, in Jon's work, function as fetters that curb women's sexuality which is seen as being dangerous or unruly. The search for fulfillment of passion often brings tragic results, and thus Jon's work underscores the difficulty of women finding liberation from the forces that constrain their lives.

Jon's work has also been used for movies including the erotic drama Ardor (2002) by director Byun Young-joo.

== Works in Translation ==
- Ein ganz einfaches gepunktetes Kleid (현대단편소설선 2집)
- I Drift on Unknown Waters in a Glass Boat (난 유리로 만든 배를 타고 낯선 바다를 떠도네)

== Works in Korean (Partial) ==
- A Woman Driving a Goat (1996)
- Nowhere Man (1997)
- A Special Day that Comes Only Once in My Life (1999)
- Merry-Go-Round Circus Woman (1999)
- Hwang Jini (2004)

== Awards ==
- 29th Hankook Ilbo Literature Prize (1996) for A Woman Tending Goats
- 2nd Literary Community Literature Prize (1997) for Nowhere Man
- 21st Century Literature Award (1998) for the short-story Merry-Go-Round Circus Woman
