= Han Dong-hee =

South Korean actress (born 1997)

- Han in 2026
- Born: April 16, 1997 (age 29); South Korea
- Occupation: Actress
- Years active: 2021–present
- Agent: Spring Company

Korean name
- Hangul: 한동희
- RR: Han Donghui
- MR: Han Tonghŭi

Han Dong-hee (Korean: 한동희; born April 16, 1997) is a South Korean actress under Spring Company. She graduated from the Korea National University of Arts She made her acting debut in a minor role in the television series The One and Only (2021–2022). She is best known for portraying Crown Princess Min Hwi-bin in Under the Queen's Umbrella (2022).

== Filmography ==
=== Film ===
Year	Title	Role	Notes	Ref.
2022	Gentleman		Film debut	
2025	Dark Nuns			

=== Television series ===
Year	Title	Role	Notes	Ref.
2021–2022	The One and Only	Woo-cheon's mother	Acting debut	
2022	One Dollar Lawyer	Kim Su-yeon		
2022	Under the Queen's Umbrella	Min Hwi-bin		
2022	May I Help You?	Tak Chung-ha		
2023	Payback: Money and Power	young Park Jun-kyung		
2023	A Bloody Lucky Day	Yoon Se-na		
2024	Frankly Speaking	Min Cho-hee		
2024	Gyeongseong Creature 2	Noh Ji-su		
2025	Queen Mantis	Seo A-ra		
2026	Climax	Han Ji-soo		
2026	The Legend of Kitchen Soldier	Cho Ye-rin		

== Accolades ==
Name of the award ceremony, year presented, award category, nominee(s) of the award, and the result of the nomination
Award ceremony	Year	Category	Nominee(s) / Work(s)	Result	Ref.
SBS Drama Awards	2025	Best Supporting Actress	Queen Mantis	Won	
