= Lee Hong-nae =

South Korean actor (born 1990)

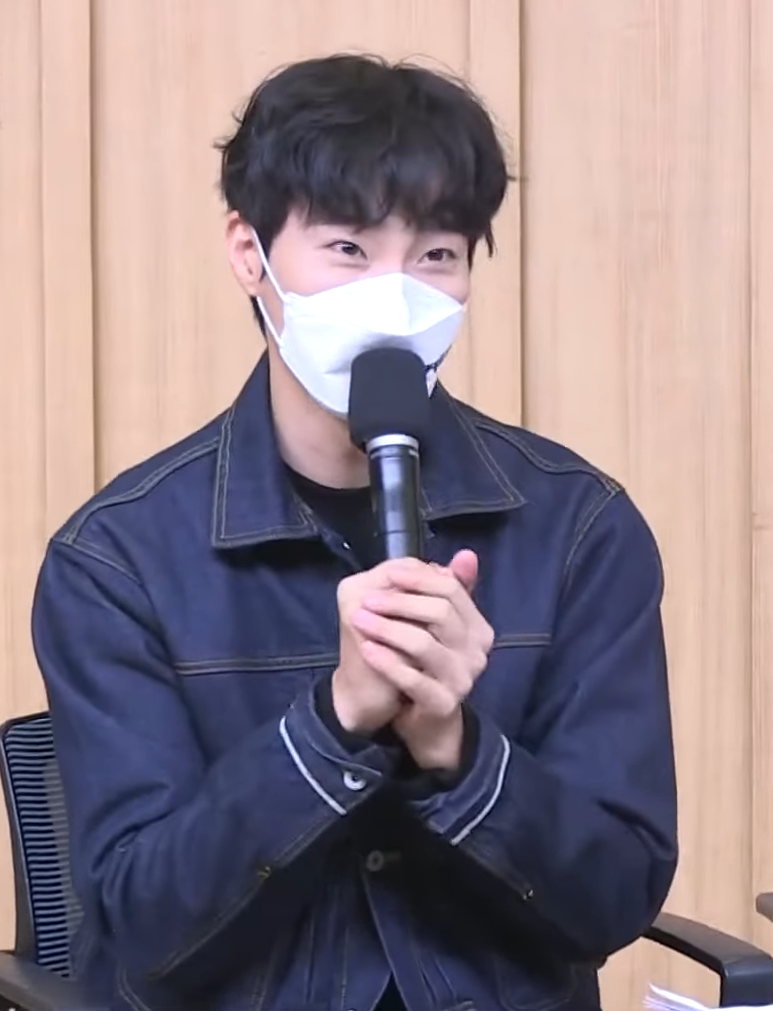
- Lee in 2022
- Born: January 28, 1990 (age 36); Yangsan, Gyeongsangnam-do, South Korea
- Education: Catholic University of Pusan
- Years active: 2014–present
- Agent: Varo Entertainment

Korean name
- Hangul: 이홍내
- Hanja: 李洪耐
- RR: I Hongnae
- MR: I Hongnae

Lee Hong-nae (Korean: 이홍내; born January 28, 1990) is a South Korean actor. He first became widely known in 2020 for playing the villain Ji Cheong-sin in the television show The Uncanny Counter, earning him the Scene Stealer Actor award at the Brand Customer Loyalty Award. Lee was honored with the Best New Actor award for his role in the film Made on the Rooftop in 2021. He was also praised for his performance in The Legend of Kitchen Soldier where he played Yoon Dong-hyeon. Subsequently, he received the Best New Actor – Film award at the 58th Baeksang Arts Award for his performance in the film Hot Blooded. He was also nominated for the Best New Actor award at the Buil Film Awards, Chunsa Film Art Awards, and Grand Bell Awards in 2022 for the role. He then was awarded the Best New Actor at the 2023 SBS Drama Awards for his work in Dr. Romantic Season 3.

== Early life ==
Lee was born and raised in Yangsan, Gyeongsang-do, where he completed his elementary, middle, and high school education. His given name, "Hong-nae" (Korean: 홍내; Hanja: 洪耐; lit. 'broad endurance'), which is interpreted as "always be considerate and patient." During his high school years, he worked part-time for a delivery service. Lee then pursue a degree in public administration from the Catholic University of Pusan.

At the age of 20, Lee moved to Seoul and ventured into modeling. Due to his relatively short stature compared to other models, he faced limited opportunities in fashion shows and primarily worked for magazines. When his modeling career failed to take off, he initially contemplated a military career, inspired by a childhood fascination with war movies. Yet, while serving his mandatory military duty, he realized that a soldier's life wasn't suited for him. It was during the late hours of his service that he made the pivotal decision to become an actor. Despite lacking formal training or attending acting school, Lee was determined to pursue an acting career, drawing inspiration from models-turned-actors like Kim Woo-bin and Jang Mi-kwan for his transition into the industry.

== Career ==
Lee made his acting debut in the 2014 film Fire in Hell. The film features aggressive elements and has garnered a strong fan base. He was cast through an open audition and recalls entering the audition room screaming, without any prior knowledge of the process. He believes that director Lee Sang-woo appreciated his innocence, for which he is very grateful. This film ignited his passion for acting. Following his debut, Lee starred in minor roles in both film and television. To financially support himself while building his career, he worked part-time in construction and cosmetology. He occasionally still modeled as well. In 2017, he appeared in the music video for BTS's cover song Come back home.

Lee Hong-nae's career began with supporting roles, including a villainous turn in the 2019 tvN series Catch the Ghost. His recognition grew significantly in 2020, first through his talked-about role as a bodyguard in tvN's The King: Eternal Monarch, and then with his major acting breakthrough as the villain Ji Cheong-sin in the OCN series The Uncanny Counter. This compelling performance earned him his first acting accolade: the Scene Stealer Award for a male actor at the 2021 Brand Customer Loyalty Award, organized by the Korea Consumer Forum.

After seven years of playing minor and supporting roles in various films and television series, Lee secured his first main role in the independent film Made on the Rooftop. For his performance in the film, he was named Best New Actor at the 41st Korean Association of Film Critics Awards.

In 2026 he was part of the main cast for The Legend of Kitchen Soldier,, where he played the role of a head chef, with a not so keen sense for cooking. His performance in the series was widely praised for a stellar portrayal of the character

== Filmography ==
=== Film ===
| Year | Title | Role | Notes | Ref. |
|---|---|---|---|---|
| 2014 | Fire in Hell | Ji-seok | | |
| 2015 | Gifted | Yeon-woo's friend | Bit part | |
| 2016 | The Last Ride | Jogger | Bit part | |
| 2018 | Marionette | Se-jeong's friend #1 | Bit part | |
| 2018 | High Society | Intern | Bit part | |
| 2018 | Door Lock | Police officer #2 | Bit part | |
| 2019 | Tazza: One Eyed Jack | Bodyguard #2 | Bit part | |
| 2019 | My Punch – Drunk Boxer | Gym coach | Bit part | |
| 2019 | The Divine Move 2: The Wrathful | Pariah dog | Bit part | |
| 2020 | Intruder | Missing police officer | Bit part | |
| 2020 | The Golden Holiday | Patrick's bodyguard #2 | Bit part | |
| 2021 | Made on the Rooftop | Ha-neul | | |
| 2021 | Spiritwalker | Wolf | Bit part | |
| 2022 | Hot Blooded | A-mi | | |
| 2023 | Count | Dong-soo | | |

=== Television series ===
| Year | Title | Role | Notes | Ref. |
|---|---|---|---|---|
| 2016 | Webtoon Hero – Tundra Show Season 2 | Student | | |
| 2016 | Drama Special – The Legendary Lackey | Seong-ho's friend #1 | | |
| 2017 | Save Me | | | |
| 2018 | Dokgo Rewind | Shin Do-yoon | | |
| 2019 | Trap | | | |
| 2019 | Catch the Ghost | Goo Dong-man | | |
| 2020 | The King: Eternal Monarch | Seok Ho-pil | | |
| 2020 | The Uncanny Counter | Ji Cheong-shin | Season 1 | |
| 2021 | Inspector Koo | Gun-wook | | |
| 2022 | O'PENing – How to Recognize Voices | Jang Do-wan | one act-drama | |
| 2022 | The King of the Desert | Hae-il | | |
| 2023 | Dr. Romantic | Lee Sun-woong | Season 3 | |
| 2026 | The Legend of Kitchen Soldier | Yoon Dong-hyeon | | |
| 2026 | The East Palace | Park-soo | | |
| 2026 | Unfriend † | Jun-hyuk | | |

== Awards and nominations ==
Name of the award ceremony, year presented, category, nominee of the award, and the result of the nomination
| Award ceremony | Year | Category | Nominee / Work | Result | Ref. |
|---|---|---|---|---|---|
| Baeksang Arts Awards | 2022 | Best New Actor – Film | Hot Blooded | Won | |
| Blue Dragon Series Awards | 2026 | Best New Actor | The Legend of Kitchen Soldier | Nominated | |
| Brand Customer Loyalty Awards | 2021 | Scene Stealer – Male Actor | The Uncanny Counter | Won | |
| Buil Film Awards | 2022 | Best New Actor | Hot Blooded | Nominated | |
| Chunsa Film Art Awards | 2022 | Best New Actor | Hot Blooded | Nominated | |
| Grand Bell Awards | 2022 | Best New Actor | Hot Blooded | Nominated | |
| Korean Association of Film Critics Awards | 2021 | Best New Actor | Made on the Rooftop | Won | |
| SBS Drama Awards | 2023 | Best New Actor | Dr. Romantic 3 | Won | |
