= Go Bo-gyeol =

South Korean actress (born 1988)

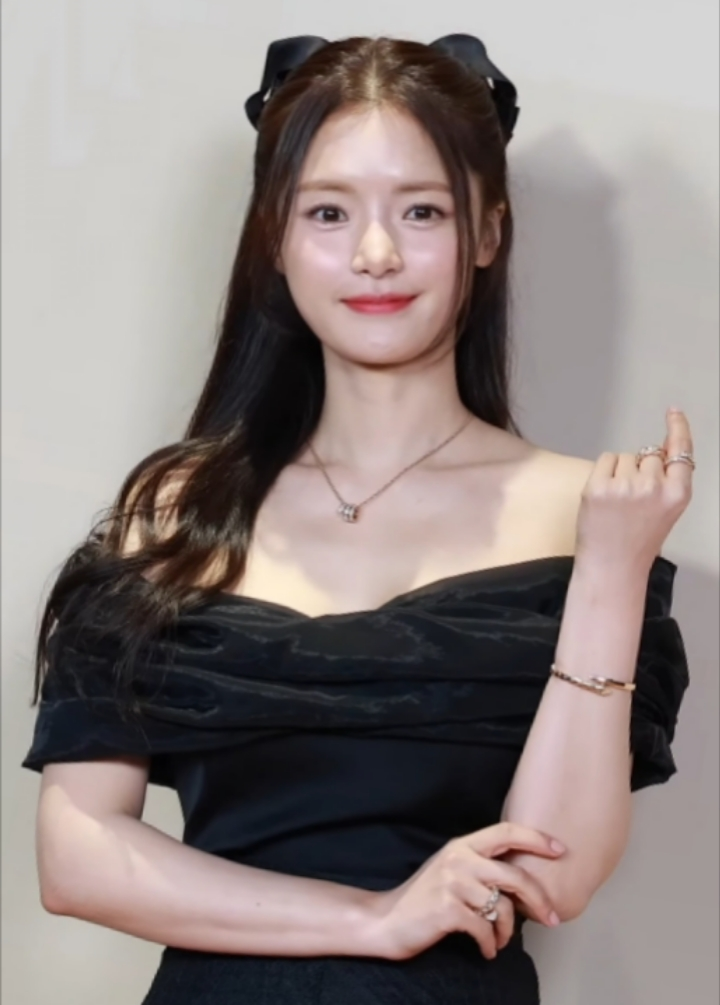
- Go in 2025
- Born: May 2, 1988 (age 38)
- Education: Seoul Institute of the Arts – Department of Acting
- Occupation: Actress
- Years active: 2011–present
- Agent: HighZium Studio

Korean name
- Hangul: 고보결
- Hanja: 高甫潔
- RR: Go Bogyeol
- MR: Ko Pogyŏl

Go Bo-gyeol (Korean: 고보결; born May 2, 1988) is a South Korean actress and model. She made her acting debut in 2011 film Turtles.

== Career ==
Go Bo-gyeol made her debut as an actress in 2011 movie Turtles. Her TV series debut was Angel's Revenge (2014). She has since appeared in a number of films and popular television dramas, including Guardian: The Lonely and Great God, Queen for Seven Days, Confession Couple, Hi Bye, Mama!, Mother and The Heavenly Idol.

== Filmography ==
=== Film ===
Year	Title	Role	Notes/Ref.
2011	Turtles	Seo Jung-jun	
2013	Where Is My DVD?	Shuri	Short film
2014	phage	—N/a	Short film
2014	Spring Breeze	—N/a	Short film
2014	The Fatal Encounter	Laundry court lady	Bit part
2015	ㅈㄱㅇㄴ	Deok-jin	Short film
2015	I Do Need to Go to Study Abroad Right Now!	Pig hair	
2016	Grandfather	Park Bo-ram	
2016	Curtain Call	An-kyung	
2017	Mother	Daughter	Short film

=== Television series ===
Year	Title	Role	Notes/Ref.
2013	Drama Special Series: "Puberty Medley"	Gou-ri	Bit part
2014	Angel's Revenge	Jeong-in	
2014	KBS Drama Special: "The Girl Who Became a Photo"	Schoolgirl	
2014	Drama Festival: "House, Mate"	Hong Eun-young	
2014	Love Frequency 37.2	Ara	Bit part
2015	The Missing	Kang Soon-young	EP. 1-2
2015	The Producers	Wang Min-jeong	
2015	Bubble Gum	Noh Dong-hwa	
2015	KBS Drama Special: "Avici"	Shin Yoo-kyung	
2016	Dear My Friends	Ha-neul	
2016	Second to Last Love	Han Song-yi	
2016	Cinderella with Four Knights	Choi Yoo-na	
2017	Guardian: The Lonely and Great God	Kim Yoo-na	
2017	Queen for Seven Days	Yoon Myung-hye	
2017	Go Back	Min Seo-young	
2018	KBS Drama Special: "Forgotten Season'	Lee Eun-jae	
2018	Mother	Kang Hyun-jin	
2018	The Hymn of Death	Yoon Sung-deok	
2019	Arthdal Chronicles	Chae-eun	
2020	Hi Bye, Mama!	Oh Min-jeong	
2021	Drama Stage: "Proxy Emotion"	Cha young	
2023	The Heavenly Idol	Kim Dal	
2024	Black Out	Choi Na-kyeom	

== Stage credit ==
List of Stage Play(s)
Year	Title		Role	Theater	Date	Ref.
Year	English	Korean	Role	Theater	Date	Ref.
2024	Flower, Stars Passing By	꽃, 별이 지나	Ji-won	Seokyung University Performing Arts Center SKON1 Hall	June 8, 2024 – August 18, 2024	

== Ambassadorship ==
- Public Relations Ambassador for the 8th Ulsan Ulju World Mountain Film Festival (2023)

== Awards and nominations ==
Name of the award ceremony, year presented, category, nominee of the award, and the result of the nomination
Award ceremony	Year	Category	Nominee / Work	Result	Ref.
KBS Drama Awards	2018	Best Actress in a One-Act/Special/Short Drama	KBS Drama Special Season 9: Forgotten Season	Nominated	
MBC Drama Awards	2024	Excellence Award, Actress in a Miniseries	Black Out	Nominated	
Stockholm Film & TV Festival	2021	Best Actress	Drama Stage Season 4: Proxy Emotion	Won	
