= Salon de Nabi =

2022 South Korean television drama series

- Promotional poster
- Hangul: 날아올라라 나비
- Lit.: Fly Up Butterfly
- RR: Naraollara nabi
- MR: Naraollara nabi
- Genre: Drama; Comedy
- Written by: Park Yeon-seon
- Directed by: Kim Bo-kyung; Kim Da-ye
- Starring: Kim Hyang-gi; Oh Yoon-ah; Choi Daniel; Shim Eun-woo
- Music by: Jeong Se-rin
- Country of origin: South Korea
- Original language: Korean
- No. of episodes: 16 (Taiwan); 10 (South Korea)

Production
- Executive producers: Choi Jae-seok; Kim Dong-sik; Lee Jeong-cheol
- Producers: Oh Seong-min; Park Soon-seo; Kwak Hong-seok
- Editor: Kim Young-joo
- Running time: 70 minutes
- Production companies: SLL; GnG Production

Original release
- Network: Chunghwa Telecom MOD; MyVideo; Hami Video
- Release: July 15 – September 2, 2022
- Network: JTBC
- Release: September 19 – October 18, 2026

Salon de Nabi (Korean: 날아올라라 나비) is a South Korean television series written by Park Yeon-seon, directed by Kim Bo-kyung and Kim Da-ye, and starring Kim Hyang-gi, Oh Yoon-ah, Choi Daniel and Shim Eun-woo, the series follows the story of hair stylists at Fly High Butterfly Hair Salon. It was scheduled to premiere on JTBC in 2022, but was postponed.

The series began airing the series ahead of its television release on July 15, 2022, in Taiwan and on August 1, 2022, titled as Salon de Nabi, on Amazon Prime Video in selected regions. It premiered on JTBC on September 19, 2026, in South Korea and aired every Saturday at 22:40 (KST) and Sunday at 22:30 (KST).

== Synopsis ==
The series tells the story of the hair stylists and interns at a hair salon named Fly High Butterfly, who transform customers into 'butterflies'. The series follows hair salon director Michelle (Oh Yoon-ah), hairstylists Jen and Kwang Soo, and interns Gi-Bbeum (Kim Hyang-gi), Moo Yeol, Teacher Woo, and Soo-ri. All work hard in tiring conditions, dealing with all kinds of customers.

== Cast ==
- Kim Hyang-gi as Gi-Bbeum
- Oh Yoon-ah as Michelle / Mi Sel, director of 'Fly Up Butterfly'
- Choi Daniel as Kwang Soo, hair designer
- Shim Eun-woo as Jen
- Park Jung-woo as Moo Yeol
- Moon Tae-yoo as Teacher Woo
- Kim Ga-hee as Soo-ri
- Lee Soo-mi as Gi-Bbeum's step mother
- Yoo In-soo as Song Kang-in
- Ryu Hye-rin as Go Seong-ah
- Lim Soo-jung
- Han Soo-ah as Han Su-a
- Park So-jin as Nam Da-hee

== Production ==
On 4 June 2020, JWIDE Company announced that Choi Daniel was positively considering a role in the television series. On 5 August, Oh Yoon-ah's agency announced that she was considering to appear in the drama.

On June 25, 2021, Oh Yoon-ah posted photos on her Instagram account and announced that it was the last day of filming.

== Release ==
Ahead of its release in South Korea, the series was released in Taiwan on Chunghwa Telecom's CHT MOD Drama 199 (now VOD+) and Taiwan Mobile's myVideo on July 15, 2022, released on the weekends. From August 13, it began airing on the LTV Idol Channel (MOD Channel 353). Titled Salon de Nabi, it was available from August 1, 2022, on Amazon Prime Video in selected regions for streaming.

The series after its run in Taiwan and Prime Video is scheduled to run in South Korea starting September 19, 2026 on JTBC as weekend series.

== Viewership ==
Salon De Nabi : South Korea viewers per episode (thousands)

Season	Episode number									
Season	1	2	3	4	5	6	7	8	9	10
1	413	484	N/A	315	376	374	389	485	348	418

Source: Audience measurement performed nationwide by Nielsen Korea.

Average TV viewership ratings
Ep.	Original broadcast date	Average audience share (Nielsen Korea)	
Ep.	Original broadcast date	Nationwide	Seoul
1	September 19, 2026	1.884% (3rd)	2.021% (2nd)
2	September 20, 2026	2.085% (3rd)	2.166% (2nd)
3	September 26, 2026	1.355% (10th)	1.329% (6th)
4	September 27, 2026	1.410% (6th)	1.550% (3rd)
5	October 3, 2026	1.587% (6th)	1.570% (4th)
6	October 4, 2026	1.596% (3rd)	1.787% (1st)
7	October 10, 2026	1.688% (3rd)	1.723% (2nd)
8	October 11, 2026	2.028% (2nd)	2.142% (2nd)
9	October 17, 2026	1.433% (5th)	1.804% (2nd)
10	October 18, 2026	1.675% (7th)	1.655% (4th)
Average		1.674%	1.775%
In the table above, the blue numbers represent the lowest ratings and the red numbers represent the highest ratings.; This drama aired on a cable channel/pay TV which normally has a relatively smaller audience compared to free-to-air TV/public broadcasters (KBS, SBS, MBC, and EBS).
