= Dynamite Kiss =

2025 South Korean TV series

- Promotional poster
- Hangul: 키스는 괜히 해서!
- Lit.: Kissing for Nothing!
- RR: Kiseuneun gwaenhi haeseo!
- MR: K'isŭnŭn kwaenhi haesŏ!
- Genre: Romantic comedy
- Written by: Ha Yoon-ah; Tae Kyung-min
- Directed by: Kim Jae-hyun
- Starring: Jang Ki-yong; Ahn Eun-jin
- Country of origin: South Korea
- Original language: Korean
- No. of episodes: 14

Production
- Running time: 70 minutes
- Production companies: Samhwa Networks; Studio S
- Budget: ₩17 billion

Original release
- Network: SBS TV
- Release: November 12 – December 25, 2025

Dynamite Kiss (Korean: 키스는 괜히 해서!) is a 2025 South Korean romantic comedy television series co-written by Ha Yoon-ah and Tae Kyung-min, directed by Kim Jae-hyun and starring Jang Ki-yong and Ahn Eun-jin. The series is about a single lady who poses as a mother in order to earn money, and the team leader who develops feelings for her. It aired on SBS TV from November 12, to December 25, 2025, every Wednesday and Thursday at 21:00 (KST). It is also available for streaming on Netflix.

== Synopsis ==
Gong Ji-hyeok and Go Da-rim work together to bring Go Da-rim’s ex-boyfriend into a business deal. But Ji-hyeok, a usually sharp and calm team leader, is caught off guard when he is kissed by Da-rim. Their relationship ends abruptly as Da-rim quickly departs back home as she hears news from her family. Go Da-rim, hiding the fact she is a single woman, pretends to be a mother to earn a living and pay her family’s debt and mother’s medical bills. On her first day she realises Gong Ji-hyeok is her boss. Da-rim needs to continue the pretence as they work together to pay the debt but the initial goals start to give way to unexpected feelings.

== Cast and characters ==
=== Main ===
- Jang Ki-yong as Gong Ji-hyeok

Team leader of "Natural BeBe", a childcare product company owned by his parents. He has a clear mind, excellent leadership skills and passion for work.

- Ahn Eun-jin as Go Da-rim

A single woman who posed as a married person to get a job in the "Mothers Task Force" of Natural BeBe as a way to pay the debt left behind by her sister.

- Kim Mu-jun as Kim Sun-woo

An aspiring photographer and Da-rim's close friend since childhood who agrees to pose as her husband. His own marriage ended by divorce.

- Woo Da-vi as Yoo Ha-young

The youngest daughter of the "TaeYoo Group" chaebol who later fell in love with Kim Sun-woo.

=== Supporting ===
==== Gong Ji-hyeok's family ====
- Choi Kwang-il as Gong Chang-ho

"Natural BeBe" chairman and father of Gong Ji-hyeok and Gong Ji-hye.

- Nam Gi-ae as Kim In-ae

Gong Chang-ho's wife and Gong Ji-hyeok's mother.

- Jung Ga-hee as Gong Ji-hye

Gong Chang-ho's daughter out of wedlock and Gong Ji-hyeok's stepsister. After her mother's death, she was taken care of by her father and became an inside director at "Natural BeBe".

==== Go Da-rim's family ====
- Cha Mi-kyung as Jeong Myeong-sun

Go Da-rim and Go Da-jeong's mother.

- Kim Soo-ah as Go Da-jeong

Go Da-rim's sister. After incurring a huge debt due to expenses for her wedding and a failed business investment with her husband, she decided to go to Jeju Island to hide. At the end of the drama, one of her sister's friends found her working as a tour guide.

==== Kim Sun-woo's family ====
- Chae Ja-woon as Kim Joon

Kim Sun-woo's son from his previous marriage.

==== Yoo Ha-young's family ====
- Seo Sang-won as Yoo Jin-tae

"TaeYoo Group" chairman and father of Yoo Ha-young and Yoo Tae-young.

- Seo Jeong-yeon as Han Mi-ok

Yoo Jin-tae's wife and mother of Yoo Ha-young and Yoo Tae-young.

- Jung Hwan as Yoo Tae-young

Yoo Ha-young's brother and Gong Ji-hye's ex-boyfriend who has an inferiority complex due to being always defeated by Gong Ji-hyeok. He later planned to use his ex Gong Ji-hye to take over "Natural BeBe" for himself.

==== Natural BeBe employees ====
- Park Jin-woo as Ma Jong-gu

Gong Ji-hye's secretary and marketing team leader.

===== Mothers Task Force =====
Initially formed by Gong Ji-hye as part of her plan to take over "Natural BeBe" from her stepbrother Gong Ji-hyeok, the division - composed of single mothers as core employees - later became a catalyst for the company's success.

- Park Ji-ah as Bae Nan-sook
- Jung Soo-young as Jang Jin-hee
- Park Jeong-yeon as Lee Go-eun
- Shin Joo-hyeop as Kang Kyung-min

The only male in the Mothers Task Force, he is Gong Ji-hyeok's trusted right hand.

==== Others ====
- Park Yong-woo as Kim Jeong-gwon
- Jeon Jae-hee as Lee So-young

A single mother who also applied for a spot in "Natural BeBe"'s Mothers Task Force in the same day as Go Da-rim.

=== Special appearances ===
- Lee Seo-jin as hotel restaurant diner (episode 1)
- Kim Kwang-kyu as hotel restaurant diner (episode 1)
- Kim Hong-kyu (Note: More known as YouTuber What's Mean) as a taxi driver (episode 1)
- Yang Joo-ho as a loan shark (episodes 2 and 3)

He tried to find Go Da-jeong to get her loan payment, however, when he was unsuccessful, he kidnapped Go Da-rim instead.

- Namkoong Min as Chun Ji-hoon (Note: Main character from the 2022 SBS drama One Dollar Lawyer, which was directed by Kim Jae-hyun) (episode 9)

One of Kim In-ae's legal counsels in her divorce case.

- Kim Ji-eun as Baek Ma-ri (episode 9)

One of Kim In-ae's legal counsels in her divorce case.

- Kwak Si-yang as Kim Sang-sik (episode 13)

A farmer and Da-rim's childhood friend.

- Kim Joo-hun as Ji-hyeok's doctor (episode 14)

== Episodes ==
No.	Title	Original release date
1	"Nitric Acid, Sulfuric Acid, and Dynamite"	November 12, 2025
Go Da-rim, who has spent five years preparing for the civil service exam while working at a supermarket, is sent to Jeju Island by her younger sister to keep her away from the wedding. There, she reunites with her ex-boyfriend Kim Jeong-gwon and his new girlfriend, who is also her friend, and pretends to be on the island with her boyfriend. After a drunken misunderstanding, she meets young CEO Gong Ji-hyeok, who is in Jeju to recruit Jeong-gwon. When Da-rim runs into her ex again, she impulsively introduces Ji-hyeok as her boyfriend, and he agrees to continue the charade. After Da-rim’s makeover makes Jeong-gwon jealous at a party, she kisses Ji-hyeok to keep up the act, and he kisses her back.
2	"Gone With a Kiss"	November 13, 2025
3	"Ping, Pong, Ping, Pong"	November 19, 2025
4	"His Black Card"	November 20, 2025
5	"Go Da-Rim is Mine! From Head to Toe!"	November 26, 2025
6	"Swayed, Driven Mad"	November 27, 2025
7	"I Want to Get Married, As Soon as Possible"	December 3, 2025
8	"Love is Hell"	December 4, 2025
9	"Don't Go. I Don't Want You to Go."	December 10, 2025
10	"The Reason I Like You"	December 11, 2025
11	"Master of the Poker Face"	December 17, 2025
12	"Very Sweet"	December 18, 2025
13	"Flirting Master of the Orchard"	December 24, 2025
14	"Dynamite Kiss"	December 25, 2025

== Production ==
=== Development ===
The series is co-written by Ha Yoon-ah and Tae Kyung-min, directed by Kim Jae-hyun, produced by Samhwa Networks and Studio S.

Samhwa Networks and Studio S signed a ₩17 billion won supply and production contract for the drama.

=== Casting ===
In October 2024, Jang Ki-yong and Ahn Eun-jin were reportedly considering to appear.

In January 2025, Jang and Ahn were officially confirmed to appear as the main characters.

== Viewership ==
Dynamite Kiss : South Korea viewers per episode (thousands)

Season	Episode number														Average
Season	1	2	3	4	5	6	7	8	9	10	11	12	13	14	Average
1	814	701	905	1108	1019	1030	1037	1141	1139	1138	1063	964	927	1323	1022

Source: Audience measurement performed nationwide by Nielsen Korea.

Average TV viewership ratings
Ep.	Original broadcast date	Average audience share	
Ep.	Original broadcast date	Nielsen Korea	
Ep.	Original broadcast date	Nationwide	Seoul
1	November 12, 2025	4.5% (9th)	4.9% (7th)
2	November 13, 2025	4.0% (13th)	3.6% (12th)
3	November 19, 2025	5.3% (9th)	5.6% (6th)
4	November 20, 2025	6.3% (6th)	6.5% (2nd)
5	November 26, 2025	5.9% (7th)	6.2% (3rd)
6	November 27, 2025	5.9% (7th)	6.1% (5th)
7	December 3, 2025	5.4% (6th)	5.5% (4th)
8	December 4, 2025	6.7% (4th)	7.1% (3rd)
9	December 10, 2025	6.4% (7th)	6.3% (5th)
10	December 11, 2025	6.6% (5th)	6.3% (5th)
11	December 17, 2025	5.9% (7th)	6.2% (4th)
12	December 18, 2025	5.6% (7th)	5.3% (6th)
13	December 24, 2025	5.2% (7th)	4.9% (7th)
14	December 25, 2025	6.9% (4th)	7.0% (4th)
Average		5.7%	5.8%
In the table above, the blue numbers represent the lowest ratings and the red numbers represent the highest ratings.

== Accolades ==
=== Awards and nominations ===
Awards and nominations
Year	Award ceremony	Category	Nominee	Result	Ref.
2025	2025 SBS Drama Awards	Excellence Award, Actor in a Miniseries Romance/Comedy Drama	Jang Ki-yong	Won	
2025	2025 SBS Drama Awards	Excellence Award, Actress in a Romance/Comedy Drama	Ahn Eun-jin	Won	
2025	2025 SBS Drama Awards	Best New Actor	Kim Mu-jun	Won	
2025	2025 SBS Drama Awards	Best New Actress	Woo Da-vi	Won	
2025	2025 SBS Drama Awards	Best Couple Award	Ahn Eun-jin and Jang Ki-yong	Won	
2026	SEC Awards	Best Asia Series	Dynamite Kiss	Pending	
