= Queen Mantis =

2025 South Korean television series

- Promotional poster
- Also known as: The Mantis: Original Sin
- Hangul: 사마귀: 살인자의 외출
- Lit.: Mantis: The Killer's Outing
- RR: Samagwi: sarinjaui oechul
- MR: Samagwi: sarinjaŭi oech'ul
- Genre: Mystery; Thriller; Police procedural
- Based on: La Mante by: Alice Chegaray-Breugnot; Nicolas Jean; Grégoire Demaison; Laurent Vivier
- Written by: Lee Young-jong
- Directed by: Byun Young-joo
- Starring: Go Hyun-jung; Jang Dong-yoon; Jo Sung-ha; Lee El
- Music by: Jo Yeong-wook
- Country of origin: South Korea
- Original language: Korean
- No. of episodes: 8

Production
- Executive producers: Lee Ok-gyu (CP); Lee Gwang-soon; Choi Jeong-bok; Kim Min-jeong
- Producers: Lee Hee-soo; Hong Sung-chang; Kim Yong-jin; Yoo Jeong-hoon; Shin Hae-eun
- Cinematography: Kim Jung-won; Lee Eui-yeol
- Editors: Park Gok-ji; Lee Yoon-hee
- Running time: 70 minutes
- Production companies: Studio S; Mega Monster; Merry Christmas; Docu-Factory Vista

Original release
- Network: SBS TV
- Release: September 5 – September 27, 2025

Related
- La Mante (French original); Mrs. Deshpande (India)

Queen Mantis (Korean: 사마귀: 살인자의 외출) is a 2025 South Korean mystery-thriller-police procedural television series written by Lee Young-jong and directed by Byun Young-joo based on the 2017 TF1 series La Mante. Go Hyun-jung and Jang Dong-yoon portray the lead roles. It aired on SBS TV from September 5, to September 27, 2025, every Friday and Saturday at 21:50 (KST).

== Synopsis ==
A woman was imprisoned as a serial killer a long time ago. The story unfolds as someone begins committing a series of murders imitating her.

== Cast ==
=== Main ===
- Go Hyun-jung as Jung Yi-shin

A woman who was imprisoned for being a serial killer.

- Jang Dong-yoon as Cha Soo-yeol / Kim Jeong-ho

A detective. Jung Yi-shin's estranged son.

- Jo Sung-ha as Choi Jung-ho

A police officer who advised Cha Soo-yeol to become a detective.

- Lee El as Kim Na-hee

A detective who should be in charge of the investigation but is replaced by Cha Soo-Yeol without knowing his connection to his birth mother.

=== Supporting ===
- Kim Bo-ra as Lee Jung-yeon

President of a pottery studio. Cha Soo-yeol's wife.

- Lee Hwang-ui as Jeong Hyeon-nam

Suyeol's maternal grandfather and Jeong Yi-shin's father. He cared for Suyeol, who grew up without parents

- Kim Min-ho as Bae Seong-gyu

A member of the serial murder investigation team. He has a deep respect and camaraderie for Kim Na-hee

- Kim Tae-jung as Choi Hyuk

The youngest detective in the Violent Crimes Investigation Unit.

- Park Wan-hyung as Son Ji-an

Cyber Investigator in the Investigation Team

- Han Dong-hee as Seo Ara / Kang Yeon-Joong

A close friend and colleague who runs the same workshop as Jeongyeon.

- Lee Chang-min as Park Min-jae
- Lee Tae-gu as Seo Gu-wan
- Lee Yoon-geon as Hong Seung-pyo
- Han Si-a as Kim Eun-ae
- Gil Eun-seong as Kim Woo-tae
- Cha Sun-bae as Park Eun-bae

== Production ==
=== Development ===
The eight-episode series is written by Lee Young-jong and directed by Byun Young-joo. It is planned by Studio S, which also co-produced the series with Mega Monster, Merry Christmas, and Docu-Factory Vista for SBS TV.

Queen Mantis is Lee's debut as a television series writer. He previously wrote the screenplay for the films Flu (2013), The Witness (2018) and 12.12: The Day (2023).

In an interview with OSEN, Lee said that the initial plan was to adapt La Mante into a film; however, Mega Monster recommended a series adaptation instead, which later prevailed.

=== Casting ===
On November 14, 2023, the production companies announced that the lead role for the series was offered to Go Hyun-jung. On July 23, 2024, Go and Jang Dong-yoon were confirmed to portray the lead roles.

Ji Chang-wook was offered the role of Cha Soo-yeol but declined due to scheduling conflict.

Kim Bo-ra previously portrayed the role of Ha Seol in the 2024 MBC TV Friday-Saturday drama Black Out, which was the debut television work of director Byun Young-joo.

=== Filming ===
Principal photography began in August 2024. Filming was done from October 2024 to February 2025.

=== Promotion ===
A teaser for the series was aired on December 21, 2024 during the 2024 SBS Drama Awards.

== Release ==
It premiered on SBS TV on September 5, 2025, and airs every Friday and Saturday at 21:50 (KST).

Queen Mantis is available for streaming on Wavve, Netflix (South Korea and selected regions), Kocowa (North America), U-NEXT (Japan), friDay Video, Hami Video and CHT MOD (Taiwan), TrueVisions Now (Thailand) and Rakuten Viki (selected regions).

== Viewership ==
Queen Mantis : South Korea viewers per episode (thousands)

Season	Episode number								Average
Season	1	2	3	4	5	6	7	8	Average
1	1272	1325	1341	1446	1270	1098	1191	1404	1293

Source: Audience measurement performed nationwide by Nielsen Media Research.

Average TV viewership ratings
Ep.	Original broadcast date	Average audience share (Nielsen Korea)	
Ep.	Original broadcast date	Nationwide	Seoul
1	September 5, 2025	7.1% (3rd)	7.3% (3rd)
2	September 6, 2025	6.9% (2nd)	7.3% (2nd)
3	September 12, 2025	7.3% (3rd)	7.0% (3rd)
4	September 13, 2025	7.5% (2nd)	7.5% (2nd)
5	September 19, 2025	6.6% (5th)	6.9% (3rd)
6	September 20, 2025	6.0% (3rd)	6.4% (3rd)
7	September 26, 2025	6.3% (6th)	6.5% (3rd)
8	September 27, 2025	7.4% (2nd)	7.9% (2nd)
Average		6.9%	7.1%
In the table above, the blue numbers represent the lowest ratings and the red numbers represent the highest ratings.

== Accolades ==
Award ceremony	Year	Category	Recipient(s)	Result	Ref.
Director's Cut Awards	2026	Best Actress (Drama)	Go Hyun-jung	Nominated	
