= Mrs. Deshpande =

Indian Hindi-language series

- Genre: Crime thriller
- Based on: La Mante by: Alice Chegaray-Breugnot; Nicolas Jean; Grégoire Demaison
- Written by: Nagesh Kukunoor; Rohit G. Banawlikar
- Directed by: Nagesh Kukunoor
- Starring: Madhuri Dixit; Siddharth Chandekar; Priyanshu Chatterjee; Diksha Juneja
- Country of origin: India
- Original language: Hindi
- No. of seasons: 1
- No. of episodes: 6

Production
- Executive producers: Moiz Tarwadi; Rahul Ved Prakash; Prasoon Garg
- Producers: Elahe Hiptoola; Sameer Nair; Deepak Segal; Nagesh Kukunoor
- Cinematography: Sangram Giri
- Editor: Tapas Shankar
- Running time: 45–50 minutes
- Production companies: Applause Entertainment; Kukunoor Movies

Original release
- Network: JioHotstar
- Release: 19 December 2025

Related
- La Mante (French original); Queen Mantis (South Korea)

Mrs. Deshpande is a 2025 Hindi-language Indian crime thriller television series on JioHotstar directed by Nagesh Kukunoor. Produced by Elahe Hiptoola, Sameer Nair and Deepak Segal under the banner Applause Entertainment and Kukunoor Movies, the series is an adaptation of acclaimed French miniseries La Mante and stars Madhuri Dixit as Mrs, Despande, a serial killer, with Siddharth Chandekar, Priyanshu Chatterjee and Diksha Juneja in pivotal supporting roles. It premiered on JioHotstar on 19 December 2025.

== Plot ==
Mumbai is gripped by fear after three people are found murdered by strangulation using nylon ropes. Each body is positioned before a mirror, with the eyes held open using synthetic glue. The unusual pattern immediately reminds IPS officer Arun Khatri of a series of eight serial killings that occurred 25 years earlier in Pune. At the time, Arun had led the investigation, which ended with the arrest of Seema Deshpande, also known as Zeenat, who has since been imprisoned in Hyderabad Jail under a concealed identity.

Arun confirms that Seema is still incarcerated and meets her in prison. She denies involvement in the recent murders and suggests the existence of a copycat killer. She offers to assist the investigation on certain conditions. Back in Mumbai, a man named Raghu is arrested during a drug delivery, only to be revealed as ACP Tejas Phadke working undercover. Arun assigns Tejas to lead the investigation into the copycat killings and discloses classified files revealing that Seema had confessed to all eight Pune murders. She had insisted that her identity be erased, her husband’s death faked, and all records of “Seema Deshpande” eliminated. She was later transferred to Hyderabad Jail under the name Zeenat.

Seema is covertly transported to Mumbai and housed in a secluded police bungalow under constant surveillance. When shown photographs of the recent murders, she confirms that they are exact replicas of her own crimes. She requests permission to cook her own food at the bungalow, which Arun allows despite Tejas’s objections.

Tejas’s personal life is introduced through his close bond with his maternal grandfather, fondly called Azoba, who raised him after his parents’ deaths—his mother in a car accident and his father from cancer. Tejas lives with his wife Tanvi, who co-owns a salon, TanD, with her close friend Divya Gokhale.

Tejas discovers that only seven people had access to Seema’s original case files. Four are now dead, leaving only Arun, Tejas, and Advocate Daruwalla alive. When Daruwalla’s copy of the file goes missing, suspicion falls on his nephew Hosh. Tejas finds letters exchanged between Hosh and Seema during her imprisonment. Hosh kidnaps his intended fourth victim and demands to meet Seema. During their monitored interaction, Hosh exhibits unstable behavior and eventually commits suicide after being psychologically provoked by Seema, ruling him out as the copycat killer.

As the investigation continues, a previously overlooked murder is uncovered—committed months before the Mumbai killings and matching the strangulation pattern. This leads into a flashback to 1997, revealing Seema’s first murder. Seema ran a small restaurant from her home and lived with her young son. Joseph, a regular customer, sexually harassed and assaulted her, burning her with cigarettes and attempting to rape her near a well. In desperation, Seema strangled Joseph with a nylon rope, killing him. Her father witnessed the aftermath and helped her dispose of the body by throwing it into the well, which was sealed overnight. Joseph’s orphaned son, Alex, was later adopted by Seema. This incident became the psychological foundation of her future crimes.

Back in the present, Seema drugs several guards at the bungalow using mushroom powder she had secretly brought with her and escapes. She briefly visits Tejas’s home and later TanD salon, raising alarm. Tejas confronts Seema in a forest, where she reveals the truth: Tejas is her biological son. She had deliberately ensured his involvement in the investigation as part of her condition to assist. Tejas is devastated and withdraws from the case.

Tejas later learns about Alex, now an adult, who reconnects with him and speaks of Seema as a protective, loving mother. Alex’s presence softens Tejas’s view of Seema. However, Alex is soon murdered by the copycat killer using the same ritualistic method, deeply traumatizing both Seema and Tejas.

The investigation reveals that Seema’s files had been digitized years earlier by a company called Zylocomp Technologies, now defunct. Soon after, the killer contacts Seema directly, calling himself her “Shishya” (disciple) and addressing her as his “Guru.” Initially believed to be male, Shishya claims ideological alignment with Seema but displays confusion and lack of moral clarity. Seema realizes that while her own murders were driven by a warped sense of justice, Shishya kills indiscriminately.

A failed murder attempt leads to the identification of the attacker as Shefali, a transgender woman. Flashbacks reveal Seema’s second killing, where she murdered an abusive father to protect his child, Suhas Gokhale. Tejas tracks Suhas’s history and concludes that Suhas later transitioned and is now living as Divya Gokhale—Tanvi’s close friend.

Divya kidnaps Tanvi and reveals herself as the copycat killer, driven by childhood abuse, gender dysphoria, failed relationships, and obsession with Seema. Seema offers herself as bait to save Tanvi. Despite police surveillance, Divya escapes with Seema to an abandoned building. There, Divya confesses to accessing Seema’s psychological reports from Hyderabad Jail and modeling her crimes accordingly.

Tejas’s team tracks Divya through evidence linked to Zylocomp. During a confrontation, Divya is fatally wounded while helping Seema escape. At Divya’s residence, Tejas discovers a suppressed psychological report revealing that his Azoba had raped Seema during her adolescence and murdered her mother to silence her. The truth shatters Tejas. When confronted, Azoba commits suicide.

Seema is escorted back to Hyderabad Jail. During the journey, she once again escapes, leaving Tejas handcuffed to his steering wheel, disappearing into uncertainty.

== Cast ==
- Madhuri Dixit as Seema Deshpande/Zeenat Fatima (fake)
  - Khushi Hajare as young Seema
- Priyanshu Chatterjee as Arun Khatri
- Siddharth Chandekar as Tejas Phadke
- Diksha Juneja as Tanvi
- Pradeep Welankar as Dinanath
- Nimisha Nair as Divya
- Kavin Dave as Hosh
- Shivraj Walvekar as DGP Bhushan Nagre
- Kenneth Desai as Jehan Daruwala
- Sulakshana Joglekar as Pallavi Sonawane

== Release ==
The series premiered on JioHotstar on 19 December 2025.

== Reception ==
Shreyas Pande of The Hindu observed that "the show unfolds with a deliberate dryness that often feels too convenient and uninventive" Nandini Ramnath of Scroll.in stated that "The six-episode series has enough contrivances to keep the pot simmering. Arun isn’t the only one who treats Seema like an angel, rather than an emissary of death. The show is disinterested in learning more than is necessary about Seema, just so that the plot may be nudged forward." Ronak Kotecha of The Times of India rated it 3/5 stars and said that "Mrs Deshpande often feels familiar and occasionally over-explanatory, yet Kukunoor maintains a firm grip on suspense, holding back key revelations until the very end."

Rahul Desai of The Hollywood Reporter India commented that "Madhuri Dixit stars in a stagey crime thriller that unfolds in a hurry and its a missed opportunity. Deepa Gahlot of Rediff.com gave 2.5 stars out of 5 and said that "By not turning Mrs Deshpande into a monster like the notorious Hannibal Lecter, the show may have reduced the chills. Still, it's an efficiently made crime show, which depends on the stardom of Madhuri Dixit." Aishwarya Vasudevan of OTT Play also rated it 2.5/5 stars and commented that "Madhuri Dixit shines as a serial killer in this gritty thriller. While her performance is powerful, slow pacing and a stretched narrative hinder the impact. A decent but flawed weekend watch."

Yatamanyu Narain of News 18 gave 4 stars out of 5 and said that "Madhuri Dixit delivers a powerful, chilling performance in Nagesh Kukunoor’s layered psychological crime thriller that grips till the final episode." Shweta Keshri of India Today rated it 3/5 stars and stated that "the series is engaging, though predictable in parts, and powered by Madhuri Dixit’s haunting performance. Her smile alone is enough to keep viewers on edge." Vinamra Mathur of Firstpost rated it 2.5/5 stars and said that "Dixit as Deshpande shows not all irons rust. And she will always be a step ahead of many around, both on and off celluloid."
