= The Winning Try =

2025 South Korean television series

- Promotional poster
- Also known as: Try: We Become Miracles
- Hangul: 트라이: 우리는 기적이 된다
- RR: Teurai: urineun gijeogi doenda
- MR: T'ŭrai: urinŭn kijŏgi toenda
- Genre: Sports drama; Coming-of-age; Comedy
- Written by: Lim Jin-ah
- Directed by: Jang Yeong-seok
- Starring: Yoon Kye-sang; Im Se-mi; Kim Yo-han
- Country of origin: South Korea
- Original language: Korean
- No. of episodes: 12

Production
- Running time: 70 minutes
- Production company: Studio S

Original release
- Network: SBS TV
- Release: July 25 – August 30, 2025

The Winning Try (Korean: 트라이: 우리는 기적이 된다) is a 2025 South Korean television series starring Yoon Kye-sang, Im Se-mi and Kim Yo-han. It aired on SBS TV from July 25, to August 30, 2025, every Friday and Saturday at 21:50 (KST). It is also available for streaming on Netflix.

== Synopsis ==
The drama revolves around the Hanyang High School rugby team, which competes hard to win the National Sports Festival but always comes in last. The team's fortunes change when Ju Ga-ram is appointed coach.

== Cast and characters ==
=== Main ===
- Yoon Kye-sang as Ju Ga-ram
- Im Se-mi as Bae I-ji
- Kim Yo-han as Yun Seong-jun

=== Supporting ===
==== Rugby club ====
- Kim Yi-jun as Oh Yeong-gwang
- Lee Soo-chan as Seo Myeong-u
- Yoon Jae-chan as Do Hyeong-sik
- Hwang Seong-bin as Kim Ju-yang
- Woo Min-gyu as Pyo Seon-ho
- Kim Dan as Mun Ung
- Cho Han-gyeol as Kang Tae-pung

==== Shooting department ====
- Lee Sung-wook as Jeon Nak-gyun
- Park Jung-yeon as Seo U-jin
- Seong Ji-yeong as Na Seol-hyun

==== Hanyang High School and other people ====
- Gil Hae-yeon as Kang Jeong-hyo
- Kim Min-sang as Seong Jong-man
- Jeong Soon-won as Bang Heung-nam
- Lee Jimin as Yang Seung-hui

==== Others ====
- Jang Hyuk-jin as Na Gyu-won
- Song Young-gyu as Kim Min-jong
- Bae Myung-jin as Ma Seok-bong
- Seo Jeong-yeon as Won-jung
- Jung Ki-seom as Moon Cheol-young
- Jo Yeon-hee as Kim Soo-hyun
- Jeong Kang-hee as Jang Han
- Oh Soo-hye as Sim So-eun
- Lee Seung-chul as Gye Chun-sik
- Kim Yeong-ung

== Production ==
The series is written by Lim Jin-ah and directed by Jang Yeong-seok, who participated in directing Taxi Driver 2 (2022). It is produced by SBS' content production subsidiary Studio S.

== Viewership ==
The Winning Try : South Korea viewers per episode (thousands)

Season	Episode number												Average
Season	1	2	3	4	5	6	7	8	9	10	11	12	Average
1	736	818	929	1106	1014	1057	963	1267	1040	1024	1027	1179	1013

Source: Audience measurement performed nationwide by Nielsen Media Research.

Average TV viewership ratings
Ep.	Original broadcast date	Average audience share (Nielsen Korea)	
Ep.	Original broadcast date	Nationwide	Seoul
1	July 25, 2025	4.1% (11th)	3.9% (9th)
2	July 26, 2025	4.4% (8th)	4.8% (5th)
3	August 1, 2025	5.1% (7th)	5.5% (7th)
4	August 2, 2025	5.4% (5th)	6.0% (4th)
5	August 8, 2025	5.5% (7th)	5.9% (5th)
6	August 9, 2025	5.7% (4th)	6.4% (3rd)
7	August 15, 2025	5.4% (5th)	5.7% (3rd)
8	August 16, 2025	6.8% (2nd)	7.3% (2nd)
9	August 22, 2025	5.6% (7th)	6.3% (5th)
10	August 23, 2025	5.5% (5th)	5.9% (5th)
11	August 29, 2025	6.0% (5th)	6.2% (3rd)
12	August 30, 2025	6.4% (3rd)	6.6% (2nd)
Average		5.5%	5.9%
In the table above, the blue numbers represent the lowest ratings and the red numbers represent the highest ratings.

== Accolades ==
=== Awards and nominations ===
Awards and nominations
Award ceremony	Year	Category	Recipient(s)	Result	Ref.
New York Television Festival International TV & Films Awards	2026	Entertainment Program: Drama	The Winning Try	Shortlisted	
SBS Drama Awards	2025	Director's Award	Yoon Kye-sang	Won	
SBS Drama Awards	2025	Excellence Award, Actor in a Miniseries Humanity/Fantasy Drama	Kim Yo-han	Won	
SBS Drama Awards	2025	Best Supporting Actress in a Miniseries Humanity/Fantasy Drama	Gil Hae-yeon	Won	
SBS Drama Awards	2025	Best Supporting Actor in a Miniseries Humanity/Fantasy Drama	Lee Sung-wook	Won	
SBS Drama Awards	2025	Best New Actor	Kim Dan	Won	
SBS Drama Awards	2025	Best New Actress	Park Jung-yeon	Won	
SBS Drama Awards	2025	Best Supporting Team	Hanyang High School rugby team	Won	
WorldFest-Houston International Film Festival	2026	Best Television, Cable, Web Production Grand Remi Award	The Winning Try	Won	
