= Love Scene Number =

2021 South Korean television series

- Promotional poster
- Hangul: 러브씬넘버#
- RR: Reobeu ssin neombeo#
- MR: Rŏbŭ ssin nŏmbŏ#
- Genre: Omnibus; Romance
- Developed by: MBC
- Written by: Hong Kyung-sil
- Directed by: Kim Hyung-min
- Starring: Kim Bo-ra; Shim Eun-woo; Ryu Hwa-young; Park Jin-hee
- Composer: Chung Joong-han
- Country of origin: South Korea
- Original language: Korean
- No. of episodes: 8

Production
- Executive producer: Kim Ho-joon
- Producer: Lee Wol-yeon
- Camera setup: Single-camera
- Running time: 48–64 minutes
- Production companies: WeMad; MBC

Original release
- Network: Wavve
- Release: February 1, 2021

Love Scene Number (Korean: 러브씬넘버#; RR: Reobeu ssin neombeo#) is a South Korean omnibus television series starring Kim Bo-ra, Shim Eun-woo, Ryu Hwa-young and Park Jin-hee. The four love scenes were released on Wavve on February 1, 2021 during the series' press conference. Co-producer MBC TV aired only two of the love scenes, on February 1 and 8.

== Synopsis ==
An omnibus miniseries which tells the complex love stories of four women aged between 23 and 42.

== Cast ==
=== Main ===
- Kim Bo-ra as Nam Doo-ah, a 23-year-old college student who majors in social science.
- Shim Eun-woo as Lee Ha-ram, a 29-year-old elementary school teacher who leaves her fiancé at the altar.
- Ryu Hwa-young as Yoon Ban-ya, a 35-year-old adjunct professor who struggles financially.
- Park Jin-hee as Jung Chung-kyung, a 42-year-old furniture designer who discovers her husband's affair.

=== Supporting ===
- Kim Young-ah as Jeon Ji-sung, a best-selling essay writer and Sung-moon's wife who appears in all scenes.

==== Love Scene #23 ====
- Kim Jong-hoon as Yoo Da-ham, a fourth-year student from another university.
- Kim Joon-kyung as Yeon Sung-woo, a graduate student and Doo-ah's senior.
- Kim Sung-hyun as Han Si-han, an engineering student who is one year younger than Doo-ah.
- Ahn Jung-hoon as Do Han-wool, Doo-ah's longtime friend and ex-boyfriend.
- Jang Sung-yoon as Lee Joo-yeon, Han-wool's classmate.
- Shin Hee-chul as Doo-ah's classmate.
- Won Jin-ho as Hong Joon-soo, Han-wool's classmate.

==== Love Scene #29 ====
- Han Joon-woo as Park Jung-seok, a middle school math teacher and Ha-ram's fiancé.
- Yoon Yoo-sun as Noh Sun-hwa, Ha-ram's mother and George's girlfriend.
- Kim Da-hyun as George, a chef at a famous restaurant and Sun-hwa's boyfriend.
- Im Ye-jin as Jung-seok's mother
- Lee Joong-yul as Jung-seok's father

==== Love Scene #35 ====
- Kim Seung-soo as Hyun Sung-moon, Ji-sung's husband and a writer.
- Choi Seung-yoon as Ji Hee-sang, Ban-ya's ex-boyfriend.
- Song Ji-woo as Oh Han-na, Hee-sang's wife.
- Lee Chae-kyung as President of Guleum Cinema
- Kim Ba-da as Seo Moo-yeon
- Choi Na-moo as Ban-ya's classmate and friend
- Kim Sa-hoon as police officer
- Kim Tae-young as university department director
- Lee Joong-yul as police officer #1
- Kim Jong-hoon as police officer #2
- Kim Jung-geun as TV announcer

==== Love Scene #42 ====
- Ji Seung-hyun as Woo Woon-bum, Chung-kyung's husband and business partner.
- Cha Soo-yeon as Kwon Hwa-ran, Myung-hoon's wife and Woon-bum's first love.
- Hyun Woo-sung as Han Myung-hoon, Hwa-ran's husband and a well known painter.
- Lee Eol as Chung-kyung's father
- Nam Gi-ae as Chung-kyung and Woon-bum's employee.
- Park Chan-young as lumber company manager
- Song Hoon as friend at reunion #1
- Lee Sung-il as friend at reunion #2
- Yong Jin as rude customer

== Episodes ==
No.	Title	Directed by	Written by	Original release date
1	"Love Scene #23 (Part 1)"	Kim Hyung-min	Hong Kyung-sil	February 1, 2021
Nam Doo-ah is a college student dating three men – Yoo Da-ham, Yeon Sung-woo and Han Si-han – who do not know about each other's existence. She also has an ambiguous relationship with her ex-boyfriend Do Han-wool who lives in the apartment below hers. One day, an anonymous person posts a picture of Doo-ah's legs taken in her apartment on her university's online community, saying that they will soon expose a female student dating three men. Doo-ah is persuaded that the post was written by one of her partners and decides to find out who. During her investigation, she discovers that Si-han dates women so they will offer him expensive gifts, Sung-woo speaks ill of her behind her back and Da-ham is a narcissist who only loves himself. Scared that other filming devices are hidden in her home, she sleeps at Han-wool's and discovers the following morning that her picture is on Han-wool's tablet and that he is about to meet her three boyfriends.
2	"Love Scene #23 (Part 2)"	Kim Hyung-min	Hong Kyung-sil	February 1, 2021
Han-wool confronts Doo-ah's boyfriends to find out who posted the anonymous message, but all say they are innocent before fighting each other. Doo-ah meets Han-wool and asks him why he posted the message, but he insists that he did not do it and that she knows he often accidentally takes pictures with his phone without noticing it. She later realizes he was right and that someone must have accessed his tablet and downloaded the picture. Han-wool suggests that only one of his two teammates could have done it, and it turns out to be Lee Ju-yeon who majors in the same field as Doo-ah. In the meantime, Yoo Da-ham, Yeon Sung-woo and Han Si-han get drunk and reveal Doo-ah's identity on her university's online community. She break up with them. Later, she realizes she broke up with Han-wool when he was in the military because she was afraid of ruining their friendship and admits to herself that she dated three men to fill in the gap left by Han-wool, though she rejects him when he confesses again. He moves out of his apartment but they eventually meet again.
3	"Love Scene #29 (Part 1)"	Kim Hyung-min	Hong Kyung-sil	February 1, 2021
29-year-old Lee Ha-ram runs away from her own wedding. A few weeks earlier, Ha-ram seems uncertain about her future marriage and imagines living a happy life with her mother Sun-hwa; she is thus angry when her mother's younger boyfriend George proposes to Sun-hwa. Ha-ram does not love her fiancé Jung-seok and is unsatisfied with him sexually. After leaving Jung-seok during an awkward moment, she witnesses Jeon Ji-sung (introduced in the previous Love Scene) sleeping with a man. At home, her drunk father comes unannounced but she kicks him out and tells her mother that she should do what makes her happy, even if it means leaving with her boyfriend to another country. Back to the present, Ha-ram meets with Ji-sung after fleeing her wedding. Later that night, Jung-seok comes into their newly-bought apartment and Ha-ram kneels before him.
4	"Love Scene #29 (Part 2)"	Kim Hyung-min	Hong Kyung-sil	February 1, 2021
Ha-ram opens up to Ji-sung, then her mother and eventually Jung-seok about the reasons why she ran away from her wedding. Jung-seok tells her that he will live with her for a week until she makes a final decision; she starts seeing him in a new light but leaves him again when they are visited by his parents and her mother. They eventually get back together but decide not to get married.
5	"Love Scene #35 (Part 1)"	Kim Hyung-min	Hong Kyung-sil	February 1, 2021
Yoon Ban-ya is a 35-year-old screenwriter and director who struggles financially and psychologically; she always carries a gun with her. One day, she starts an affair with Hyun Sung-moon because she wants to ruin him, not knowing that he is married to her acquaintance Ji-sung though they have been separated for years. Ji-sung offers Ban-ya a place to stay. Ban-ya is given new opportunities thanks to Sung-moon. Ji-sung discovers the affair. Ban-ya wakes up to find money left by Sung-moon on the hotel room's bedside table.
6	"Love Scene #35 (Part 2)"	Kim Hyung-min	Hong Kyung-sil	February 1, 2021
Sung-moon clears the misunderstanding about the money, then opens up about a former student of his who committed suicide years ago and how his wife used his journal and published it as her own. Ban-ya finds out that Ji-sung is her wife. In a flashback, it is revealed that Ban-ya was dating Sung-moon's former student and that he killed himself using the gun she gifted him. Ban-ya confronts Ji-sung and Sung-moon; she breaks up with Sung-moon. Ji-sung accepts to get divorced before publicly announcing that her husband's affair with Ban-ya is the reason why their marriage ended. Ban-ya tries blackmailing Ji-sung but the latter stabs her. A year later, Ban-ya is living in Sung-moon's apartment though she has not seen him since the accident; they meet again at her film's premiere.
7	"Love Scene #42 (Part 1)"	Kim Hyung-min	Hong Kyung-sil	February 1, 2021
Jung Chung-kyung is a furniture designer who struggles with the physical changes of her body. She has been married to Woo Woon-bum for 20 years and co-own a workshop with him. After an appointment with her OB-GYN, she learns that she needs surgery and that her uterus may have to be removed. She has a row with her husband over getting pregnant in the future, with Chung-kyung feeling guilty about having another child after her previous miscarriage. One night, she follows Woon-bum after he receives a message and discovers that he is having an affair with Kwon Hwa-ran, an alumnus who recently had another miscarriage. Back home, she wonders if she can live without Woon-bum and eventually decides that she can.
8	"Love Scene #42 (Part 2)"	Kim Hyung-min	Hong Kyung-sil	February 1, 2021
During a dinner with her father, Chung-kyung gets angry at him for cheating on her mother and warns Woon-bum not to cheat on her. She then decides to do the surgery which allows her to keep her uterus and suggests to her husband to have a baby which he does not seem to want anymore. Chung-kyung learns from Hwa-ran's husband, Han Myung-hoon, that the affair is not physical and he apologizes on behalf of her wife. He then suggests to have a short affair to balance their own relationship with their spouse. Hwa-ran visits the workshop before calling Chung-kyung to say that Woo-bum loves her. When they meet, Chung-kyung lies that she knew all along about the affair and that Woon-bum met with her because of pity, not love. Chung-kyung accepts Myung-hoon's offer but changes her mind when they start sleeping together. In the meantime, her father passes away and Woon-bum learns about the one-night stand. Chung-kyung and Woon-bum eventually decide to stay together and that time will heal their wounds.

== Production ==
=== Development ===
Planned by MBC and invested by Wavve, the series is entirely pre-produced.

=== Music ===
The following is the official tracklist of Love Scene Number: Original Soundtrack album, which was released on February 1, 2021. The full musical score was composed by Chung Joong-han which he co-arranged with Brandon Jung.

Love Scene Number: Original Soundtrack

No.	Title	Length
1.	"Tricycle" (세발자전거)	1:56
2.	"Seeping Into You and I Am You" (너에게 스며들어 겹쳐진다)	3:04
3.	"Scent of Cherished Moments" (기억의 향기)	2:23
4.	"Slowly, a Step at a Time" (한 걸음씩 천천히 갈게요)	3:00
5.	"Putting on New Clothes" (새옷을 꺼내입고)	1:30
6.	"A Toy in My Palm" (손안에 장난감)	1:24
7.	"Between Elucidation and Excuse" (해명과 변명사이)	1:32
8.	"The End of Avidity" (욕망의 끝)	1:26
9.	"And We Meet Again (Feat. Song Young-joo)" (재회 (Feat. 송영주))	3:14
10.	"Longing After Longing" (그립고 그립다)	2:52
11.	"The Last Dance"	3:54
12.	"Playing Detectives" (탐정놀이)	1:43
13.	"Intruder" (불청객)	1:21
14.	"If It Were All a Dream" (꿈이였으면 좋겠어)	2:13
15.	"And Here We Are Again" (그렇게 우린 또다시)	1:26
16.	"Thinking of You and Missing You" (생각나고 보고싶고)	3:04
17.	"What Do We Do?" (어떡하지?)	0:50
18.	"Some Goodbye (Feat. Park Yoon-woo)" (찬란한 이별 (Feat. 박윤우))	1:40
19.	"The Memory Beyond That Door"	4:33
20.	"Taking Featherlight Steps to You" (사뿐히 걸어서 너에게)	1:47
21.	"A Humming Song" (흥얼흥얼)	2:18
22.	"Back to Where We Were" (다시 그 자리에)	3:41
23.	"Another Beginning" (또 다른 시작)	1:32
24.	"Scattering Apart (Feat. Song Young-joo)" (흩어진다 (Feat. 송영주))	3:12
Total length:		55:26

Songs not featured on the official soundtrack album:

- 아무 말도 더 하지 않고 (With No Other Words) by Kang Asol
- 기쁜 우리 젊은 날 (Happy Days of Our Youth) by Bae Young Gyeong
- 푸른 양철 스쿠터 (Blue Steel Scooter) by My Aunt Mary

== Ratings ==
Average TV viewership ratings (Note: MBC TV did not air Love Scenes #29 and #35. The aired Love Scenes were broadcast in the form of single episodes each divided into two parts.)
Episode	Part	MBC TV broadcast date	Nielsen Korea
Love Scene #23	1	February 1, 2021	0.6%
Love Scene #23	2	February 1, 2021	0.8%
Love Scene #42	1	February 8, 2021	1.1%
Love Scene #42	2	February 8, 2021	1.3%
Average			1.0%
The blue numbers represent the lowest ratings and the red numbers represent the highest ratings.
