= Park Jung-yeon =

South Korean actress (born 1997)

- Born: 13 May 1997 (age 29); South Korea
- Other name: Park Jeong-yeon
- Education: Hanyang University (Department of Theater and Film)
- Occupation: Actress
- Years active: 2020–present
- Agent: Salt Entertainment
- Relatives: Park Seung-yeon (older sister)
- Family: Park Hak-ki (father); Song Geum-ran (mother)

Korean name
- Hangul: 박정연
- RR: Bak Jeongyeon
- MR: Pak Chŏngyŏn

Park Jung-yeon (Korean: 박정연; born 13 May 1997) is a South Korean actress. She first became known for her portrayal of the future Empress Myeongseong in the television series Kingmaker: The Change of Destiny (2020).

== Early life ==
Park was a former trainee of SM Entertainment and also former member of SM Rookies. In 2019, she left SM and signed with KeyEast to become an actress. Both of her parents and older sister Park Seung-yeon (also known as Dan-A) are singers.

== Career ==
Park made her acting debut in the last episode of 2020 tvN's drama Hi Bye, Mama! as the grown-up Cho Seo-woo. In the same year, she acted her first regular role in TV Chosun's Kingmaker: The Change of Destiny as the future Empress Myeongseong.

Park's next major role was in the 2022 TVING's series I Have Not Done My Best Yet, an adaptation of Japanese manga series I'll Give It My All... Tomorrow.

Park joined the cast of 2025 SBS' sports coming-of-age series The Winning Try, as shooting sports ace athlete. In the same year she also acted in KBS2's weekend family Our Golden Days as rising young painter. Park won Best New Actress for both series at the KBS and SBS Drama Awards.

== Filmography ==
=== Film ===
Year	Title	Role	Ref.
2021	Nobody's Lover	Jung-yeon	

=== Television series ===
Year	Title	Role	Ref.
2020	Hi Bye, Mama!	Cho Seo-woo	
2020	Kingmaker: The Change of Destiny	Min Ja-young, the future Empress Myeongseong	
2024	The Judge from Hell	Cha Min-jung	
2025	The Winning Try	Seo Woo-jin	
2025	Our Golden Days	Park Young-ra	
2026	100 Days of Deception	Kim Myung-nam	

=== Web series ===
Year	Title	Role	Notes	Ref.
2021	Will You Leave?	Min Yoo-jung		
2022	I Have Not Done My Best Yet	Nam Sang-ah		
2022	We're Not Trash	Shin Jo-hui		
2023	Duty After School	Yoon-seo	Cameo	
2023	Daily Dose of Sunshine	Hye-won		

=== Music video appearances ===
Year	Title	Role	Ref.
2017	BTS (방탄소년단) "Love Yourself" Highlight Reel (起承轉結)	Suga's girlfriend	
2017	Donghae X Cadillac - "Perfect"		

== Awards and nominations ==
Name of the award ceremony, year presented, category, nominee of the award, and the result of the nomination
Award ceremony	Year	Category	Nominee / Work	Result	Ref.
KBS Drama Awards	2025	Best New Actress	Our Golden Days	Won	
SBS Drama Awards	2025	Best New Actress	The Winning Try	Won	
