= Kim Bo-ra =

South Korean actress (born 1995)

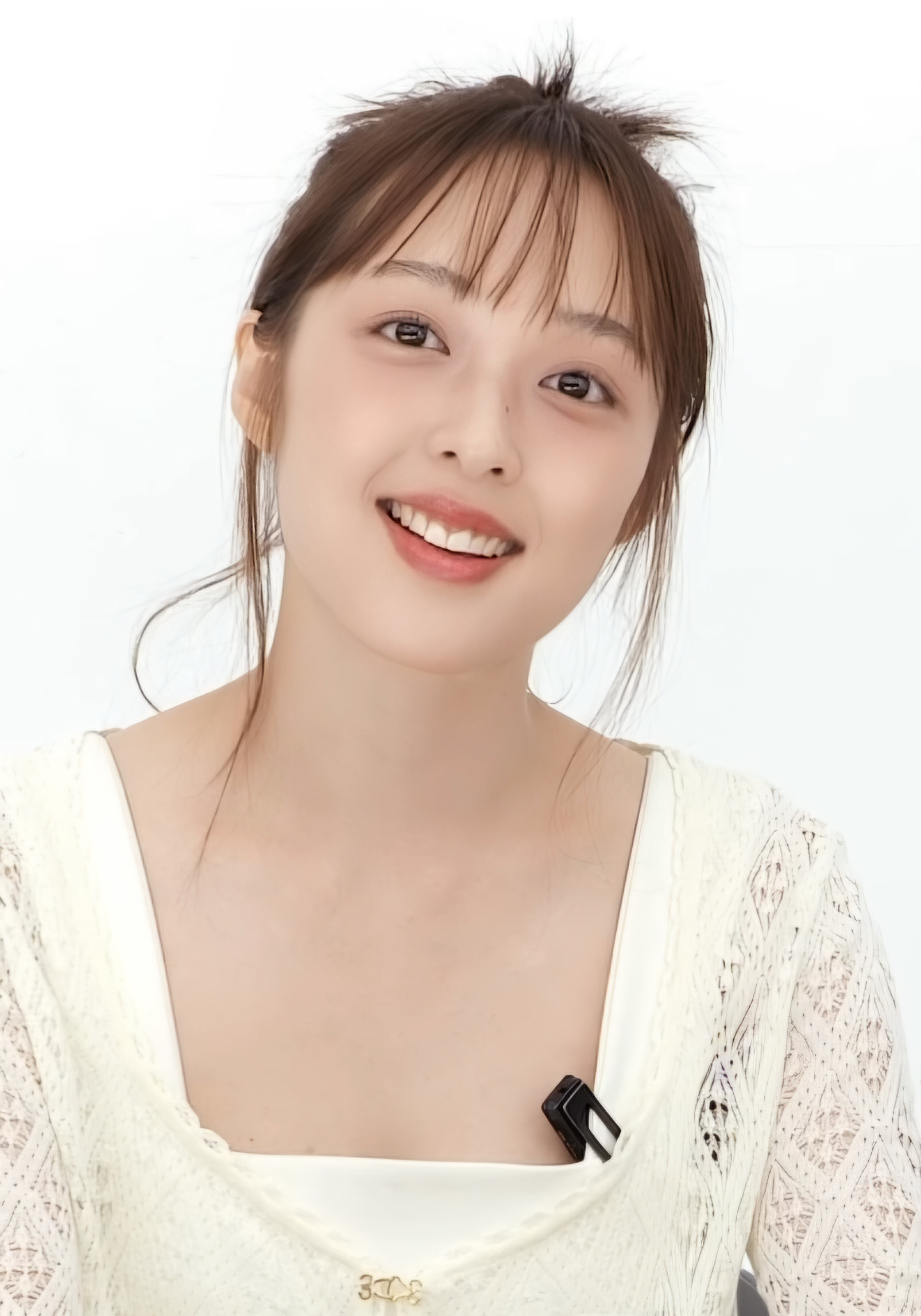
- Kim in April 2023
- Born: September 28, 1995 (age 31); Incheon, South Korea
- Education: Inha University (B.A. in Film and Theatre Studies)
- Occupation: Actress
- Years active: 2005–present
- Agent: Noon Company
- Spouse: Jo Ba-reun (m. 2024; div. 2025)

Korean name
- Hangul: 김보라
- RR: Gim Bora
- MR: Kim Pora

Kim Bo-ra (Korean: 김보라, born September 28, 1995) is a South Korean actress. She gained recognition for her role in the hit drama Sky Castle (2018). She started her career as a child when she was in the film For Horowitz (2006), and has since been in the dramas and films Jungle Fish 2 (2010), Bel Ami (2013), Glamorous Temptation (2015), and others.

== Personal life ==
On March 5, 2024, JTBC reported that Kim would marry director Jo Ba-reun after three years together. Kim's agency later confirmed this and revealed that the ceremony would take place in June and that the wedding would be held in private with their families, relatives, and close acquaintances. The couple married on June 8, 2024. On May 10, 2025, Kim's agency confirmed rumors that the couple had divorced.

== Other appearances ==
In 2019, she appeared on the television commercial for Koreaglow, a beauty soap from Unilever.

== Filmography ==
=== Film ===
Year	Title	Role	Notes	Ref.
2006	For Horowitz	Min-hee		
2007	Shim's Family	School girl		
2007	Small Town Rivals	young Hyang-soon		
2007	Evil Twin	young So-yeon		
2012	Children of Heaven	Cho Seong-ah	Main Role	
2012	Grape Candy	Yeo-eun		
2012	Perfect Number	Yoon-ah		
2013	Incomplete Life: Prequel	Ahn Young-yi	Main Role	
2014	Monster	Park Eun-jeong		
2015	Shoot Me in the Heart	Eun-yi		
2016	Time Renegades	Choi Hyun-joo		
2016	Night Song	Hee-in	Main Role	
2016	I Miss You - Boy meets girl	Ha-jin		
2019	Goodbye Summer	Han Soo-min	Main Role	
2019	Warning: Do Not Play	Kim Ji-soo		
2021	Ghost Mansion	Da Hye		
2022	Love and Leashes	Hana	Netflix film	
2022	Garden of the Stars	Narrator	barrier-free version	
2023	The Ghost Station			

=== Television series ===
Year	Title	Role	Notes	Ref.
2005	Wedding	young Lee Se-na		
2006	Famous Princesses	Goo Seul-bi		
2006	Love Me When You Can	Ha Yoo-mi		
2007	Kimchi Cheese Smile	young Shin Yeon-ji		
2008	My Pitiful Sister	Ji-yoon		
2010	Jungle Fish 2	Yoon Gong-ji		
2011	Royal Family	young Kim In-sook		
2011	Scent of a Woman	young Lee Yeon-jae		
2011	Vampire Prosecutor	Yeon-ji	Cameo (Episode 12)	
2012	Ugly Cake	Seo Yoo-min		
2012	Seoyoung, My Daughter	young Lee Yeon-hee		
2013	Master's Sun	Ha Yoo-jin	Cameo (Episode 2)	
2013	Love in Her Bag	teenage Eun Jung-soo		
2013–2014	Bel Ami	Kwi-ji		
2014	Mother's Garden	Kim Soo-ah		
2014	Climb The Sky Walls	Yoo-jin		
2014	S.O.S. (Strawberry On the Shortcake): Save Me	Jung Yoo-yi		
2014	Bland You	Bo-ra		
2015	Who Are You: School 2015	Seo Young-eun		
2015	Glamorous Temptation	young Kang Il-joo		
2016	Webtoon Hero Toondra Show 2: Flower Family	Dokgo Eok-sae		
2017	The King in Love	young Princess Wonseong		
2017	Avengers Social Club	Baek Seo-yeon		
2018–2019	Sky Castle	Kim Hye-na		
2019	Ghostderella	Min-ah		
2019	Her Private Life	Cindy / Kim Hyo-Jin		
2020	Touch	Han Soo-yeon		
2020	SF8	Joan	Episode: "Joan's Galaxy"	
2020	KBS Drama Special	Hong-joo	Episode: "While You Are Away"	
2021	Love Scene Number	Doo-ah	Episode: "Love Scene #23"	
2023–2024	Like Flowers in Sand	Joo Mi-ran		
2024	Black Out	Ha Seol		
2025	Queen Mantis	Lee Jung-yeon		

=== Web series ===
Year	Title	Role	Notes	Ref.
2017	My Only Love Song	Gwang-nyeo / New Manager		
2018	Luv Pub	Baek Ha-yeon	PLAYLIST Channel	
2018	Love Your Glow	Kang Yoo-na	BPMSTUDIO Channel	
2021	I'm Watching You	MC		
2023	Finnish Papa	Lee Yu-ri		

=== Music video appearances ===
Year	Song title	Artist	Notes	Ref.
2012	"I need you"	K.Will		
2013	"The Day to Love"	Lee Seung-chul		
2015	"My first love"	Berry Good		
2019	"If you listen to this song"	Cho Dae-ho	Promotional music video produced for 'MARHEN.J'	

== Discography ==
Year	Song title	Album	Notes	Ref.
2010	"Feeling Sad (Farewell Ver.)"	Jungle Fish 2 OST		
2020	"Breath of the Stars"	SF8 - Joan's Galaxy OST		

== Ambassadorship ==
Year	Title	Notes	Ref.
2013	Honorary Ambassador of '16th Bucheon International Comics Festival'		
2015	Honorary Ambassador of '17th Seoul International Youth Film Festival'		
2019	Honorary Ambassador of '3rd Korea Youth Day'		
2021	Ambassador for 2022 Unobstructed Films	with Jang Dong-yoon and Oh Seong-yoon	

== Awards and nominations ==
Name of the award ceremony, year presented, category, nominee of the award, and the result of the nomination
Award ceremony	Year	Category	Nominee / Work	Result	Ref.
Korea Drama Awards	2019	Popular Female Character	Sky Castle	Won	
MBC Drama Awards	2021	Excellence Award, Actress in a Short Drama	Love Scene Number	Nominated	
