= Kim Dan =

South Korean actor (born 2003)

- Born: Kim Young-rok; February 6, 2003 (age 23); South Korea
- Education: Korea National University of Arts
- Occupation: Actor
- Years active: 2025–present
- Agent: MAA

Korean name
- Hangul: 김영록
- RR: Gim Yeongrok
- MR: Kim Yŏngnok

Stage name
- Hangul: 김단
- RR: Gim Dan
- MR: Kim Tan
- Website: maa.co.kr

Kim Young-rok (Korean: 김영록; born February 6, 2003) known professionally as Kim Dan (김단), is a South Korean actor under MAA. He made his acting debut on the SBS TV drama The Winning Try (2025).

== Personal life ==
Kim was born on February 6, 2003 in South Korea. He attended the Korea National University of Arts of Theater and Film in 2022.

== Career ==
Kim made his acting debut on the SBS TV drama The Winning Try (2025). Before that, he made a brief appearance in the tvN drama Resident Playbook (2025).

On August 28, 2025, Kim was cast and confirmed to appear in the upcoming romantic fantasy drama Men of the Harem as a male concubine. In November, he was confirmed to star alongside Park Yu-rim and Ryujin in the film Night on Earth, which wrapped up filming in October 2025, and was also confirmed as the lead in the 2025 Love: Track.

== Filmography ==
=== Film ===
Year	Title	Role	Ref.
TBA	Night on Earth	Su	

=== Television series ===
Year	Title	Role	Notes	Ref.
2025	Resident Playbook	Surgical Resident	Guest role	
2025	The Winning Try	Moon Woong	Supporting role	
2025	Love: Track	Oh Min-woo	Season 16	
2027	Men of the Harem	TBA	Main role	
TBA	Ma Teresa	Park Seol		

== Awards and nominations ==
Year	Association	Category	Work	Result	Ref.
2025	SBS Drama Awards	Best New Actor	The Winning Try	Won	
