= Woo Da-vi =

South Korean actress (born 1999)

- Born: October 13, 1999 (age 27); South Korea
- Education: Sungshin Women's University
- Occupation: Actress
- Years active: 2019–present
- Agent: Awesome ENT

Korean name
- Hangul: 우다비
- RR: U Dabi
- MR: U Tabi

Woo Da-vi (Korean: 우다비; born October 13, 1999) is a South Korean actress under Awesome ENT.

== Career ==
In May 2025, Woo signed an exclusive contract with UAA (United Artists Agency). In February 2026, Woo signed with Awesome ENT.

== Filmography ==
=== Television series ===
Year	Title	Role	Notes	Ref.
2020	Extracurricular	Sooji		
2020	Live On	Kim Eun-ha		
2021	At a Distance, Spring Is Green	Gong Mi-joo		
2021	Melancholia	Sung Ye-rin		
2022	Dear.M	Hwang Bo-young		
2023	Poong, the Joseon Psychiatrist	Princess Lee Seo-yi	Season 2	
2023	Maestra: Strings of Truth	Cha Se-eum (young)		
2024	Jeongnyeon: The Star Is Born	Hong Ju-ran		
2025	Dynamite Kiss	Yoo Ha-young		
2026	No Tail to Tell	Department store girl	Guest role	
2026	You More Than the Scent of Spring	Kim Na-eun	KBS Drama Special Sound:Track	
2027	Palace Land	Song Ye-jin		

=== Web series ===
Year	Title	Role	Notes	Ref.
2019	Triple Fling	Lee Do-yeon	Acting debut (Season 2)	
2020	Trap	Yang Hye-ji		

== Accolades ==
Name of the award ceremony, year presented, award category, nominee(s) of the award, and the result of the nomination
Award ceremony	Year	Category	Nominee(s) / Work(s)	Result	Ref.
SBS Drama Awards	2025	Best New Actress	Dynamite Kiss	Won	
