= Shim Eun-woo =

South Korean actress (born 1992)

- 심은우
- Born: Park So-ri; June 2, 1992 (age 34); Donghae, Gangwon-do, South Korea
- Education: Yong In University
- Occupations: Actress; singer
- Years active: 2016–present

Shim Eun-woo (Korean: 심은우; born June 2, 1992), born Park So-ri, is a South Korean actress. She has starred in the Korean television series such as Wanted (2016), Suspicious Partner (2017), Radio Romance (2018), and Arthdal Chronicles (2019). She's best known as one of the main role, Min Hyun-seo in the smash-hit Korean drama, The World of the Married (2020) which is her first main role in a drama.

== Personal life ==
On March 8, 2021, a former middle school classmate of Shim made a post on an online community board, accusing the actress of school bullying. The former classmate alleged that while she had not suffered physical violence, she had been a victim of intense social ostracism and psychological bullying, and that Shim had taken the lead in subjecting her to extreme emotional abuse. Despite initially denying the accusations, Shim posted an official statement online, admitting to the school bullying, and apologizes for her behavior and wrongdoings. Shim revealed that prior to the statement, she met the classmate and her family in person to apologize.

== Filmography ==
=== Film ===
Year	Title	Role	Notes	Ref.
2016	Queen of Walking	Lee Ha-ni		
2018	60 Days of Summer	Ka-eul		
2022	Seire	Hae-mi		

=== Television series ===
Year	Title	Role	Notes	Ref.
2016	Wanted	Lee Ji-eun		
2017	Suspicious Partner	Hong Cha-eun		
2017	Rebel: Thief Who Stole the People	Female Shaman		
2018	Less Than Evil	Jeon Joo-yeon		
2018	Radio Romance	Gamoom (drought)		
2019	Arthdal Chronicles	Tapien		
2019	Diary of a Prosecutor	Ye-rim		
2020	The World of the Married	Min Hyun-seo		
2021	Love Scene Number	Lee Ha-ram	Episode: "Love Scene #29"	
2021	Fly High Butterfly			
