= Black Out (TV series) =

2024 South Korean television series

- Promotional poster
- Hangul: 백설공주에게 죽음을
- Hanja: 白雪公主에게 죽음을
- Lit.: Snow White Must Die
- RR: Baekseol gongjuege jugeumeul
- MR: Paeksŏl kongjuege chugŭmŭl
- Genre: Mystery; Crime; Thriller
- Based on: Snow White Must Die by Nele Neuhaus
- Written by: Suh Joo-yeon
- Directed by: Byun Young-joo
- Starring: Byun Yo-han; Ko Jun; Go Bo-gyeol; Kim Bo-ra
- Music by: Jeon Se-jin
- Opening theme: "Title of Blackout" by Jeon Se-jin
- Ending theme: "Forgotten Night" by Kim Ji-a
- Country of origin: South Korea
- Original language: Korean
- No. of episodes: 14

Production
- Executive producers: Lee Jae-moon; Kim Dong-rae
- Producer: Kim Dong-rae
- Cinematography: Park Jae-hong; Kim Sung-ho
- Editors: Son Yoon-kyoung; Kim So-young
- Running time: 63–65 minutes
- Production companies: Hidden Sequence; RaemongRaein

Original release
- Network: MBC TV
- Release: August 16 – October 4, 2024

Black Out (Korean: 백설공주에게 죽음을) is a 2024 South Korean television series written by Seo Joo-yeon, directed by Byun Young-joo, and starring Byun Yo-han, Ko Jun, Go Bo-gyeol, and Kim Bo-ra. Based on the German novel Snow White Must Die by Nele Neuhaus, it depicts a series of incidents that occur in a closed-off village and the ugly nature of the hidden inner self of humans. It aired on MBC TV from August 16, to October 4, 2024, every Friday and Saturday at 21:50 (KST). It is also available for streaming on local OTT platforms, Wavve and Coupang Play.

Black Out was first premiered in the Rendez-Vous section of the 2024 Canneseries, where it received attention for its dense story, excellent directing, and solid acting skills.

== Synopsis ==
A popular and well-liked medical student in his small town, Goh Jeong-woo is intelligent and full of promise. His life, however, drastically changes following a night of a supposed to be celebration with classmates. Following his blackout, he is charged with the murders of two classmates. Even though he has denied any involvement in the events and has no recollection of them, he is found guilty and given a ten-year prison sentence based on circumstantial but damning evidence.

After being released from prison, Jeong-woo has changed. He goes back to his hometown, but instead of the friendly reception he was used to, he encounters animosity, mistrust, and bitterness. The residents of the town continue to think he is a murderer, and they cause him hardship. His guilt and despair are exacerbated when his own mother, who had cautioned him against going back, has a terrible accident and goes into a coma.

Determined to clear his name and haunted by his lost memories, Jeong-woo begins his own investigation into the killings. Detective Noh Sang-cheol joins him, and he is given a new case that appears to be related to the crime that occurred ten years ago. They develop a tense alliance despite their early mistrust of one another, each motivated by a desire to learn the truth.

They discover a web of lies, secrets, and ulterior motives within the ostensibly peaceful village as they investigate the case further. They learn that the victims weren't as innocent as they first appeared to be and that there were a number of people in the town who wanted them dead. As a result of their investigation, they are forced to face influential community members who are anxious to conceal the truth.

== Cast and characters ==
=== Main ===
- Byun Yo-han as Goh Jeong-woo

A promising medical student who suddenly becomes a murderer after a murder case he can't even remember. He is arrested on charges of murdering two female students in the same class and serves 10 years in prison. After his release, he comes back to his hometown to get to the bottom of the murders to clear his name.

- Ko Jun as Noh Sang-cheol

A detective who is assigned to the case related to Jeong-woo. He was an elite detective with a promising future who graduated at the top of his class from the police academy, but his life and career are ruined when his bride is brutally murdered on his wedding day, and he is demoted to a local police station.

- Go Bo-gyeol as Choi Na-gyeom

A top star and Jeong-woo's high school classmate who has a crush on him for a long time. She devotedly supports Jung-woo for 10 years while he is in prison and dreams of a happy life after his release.

- Kim Bo-ra as Ha-seol

A medical student who takes a leave of absence from medical school and travels around the country on a scooter, where she coincidentally ends up working at a restaurant in Mucheon Village, where incident of strange events occurs.

=== Supporting ===
==== Su-oh's family ====
- Kwon Hae-hyo as Hyun Gu-tak

Chief of Mucheon Police Station with over 30 years of criminal experience and Su-oh's father. He was the closest childhood friend of Jeong-woo's father, but after his death, he took on the role of Jeong-woo's guardian.

- Lee Ga-sub as Hyun Su-oh / Hyun Geon-oh
1. Hyun Su-oh: Gu-tak's autistic older twin son who likes to spend time alone in the greenhouse, where he thinks and draws. He was happiest when eating ice cream given by Ha-seol, began to change when Jeong-woo returned.
2. Hyun Geon-oh: Gu-tak's younger twin son and Jeong-woo's best friend. He looked just like Su-oh, but his behavior was completely different. After studying abroad in the United States, he was said to have been doing very well. He suddenly returned to the village. However, it is somewhat awkward to say that it is a successful young man who has been rumored to be.

==== Mr. and Mrs. Ye Young-sil ====
- Bae Jong-ok as Ye Yeong-sil

A three-term member of the National Assembly from Mucheon City, who has a sharp and upright personality to the point of being elected at a young age. She is not satisfied with the present and endlessly develops her ambition to reach a higher peak.

- Kong Jeong-hwan as Park Hyeong-sik

Young-sil's husband who is ten years younger. He is a psychiatrist who is also the director of Mucheon Sarang Hospital and Su-oh's doctor. He looks like a model in a suit, but he's the epitome of noblesse oblige who contributes to society so that no woman is left out in this city.

==== Jung-woo's family ====
- Kim Mi-kyung as Jung Geum-hee

Jeong-woo's mother who is upright as bamboo and stays in the village as if she is taking on the sins of her son, and she completely endures the people's contempt and curses.

- Ahn Nae-sang as Ko Chang-soo

Jeong-woo's father who considers his family to be the most important thing in life and will do anything for his son. He continued to run Mucheon Garden for his son who would return after paying for his sins 10 years later, but died of a cerebral hemorrhage.

==== Jung-woo's friends ====
- Lee Tae-gu as Yang Byeong-mu

A second-year detective who is quick-witted, friendly to his seniors, and well-versed in local affairs. He is Jeong-woo's long-time friend who used to feel inferior to him when he was young, but now the relationship has reversed, and he takes care of Jeong-woo with compassion.

- Lee Woo-je as Shin Min-su

A long-time childhood friend of Jeong-woo who is sensitive, timid, and cries easily. He works as an emergency room nurse at Mucheon Sarang Hospital. He is also an optimistic person who always puts food first, and often makes mistakes in his speech.

- Jang Ha-eun as Shim Bo-yeong

Jeong-woo's best friend in school days. She grew up in an unfortunate family environment, but has a bright and cheerful personality.

- Han So-eun as Park Da-eun

Jeong-woo's girlfriend. She stole the hearts of all the boys in Mucheon as soon as she transferred from Seoul.

==== The Villagers ====
- Jo Jae-yoon as Shim Dong-min

Bo-yeong's father whose life falls apart due to her death. He is an alcoholic who commits violence whenever he drinks, and his symptoms worsened after his daughter's death, so he never puts down a bottle of alcohol every day and uses it to relieve stress by being violent to Geum-hee.

- Park Mi-hyun as Lee Jae-hee

Bo-yeong's mother who run away from her husband that become violent whenever he drank, but with the help of Geum-hee, she returned to the village.

- Cha Soon-bae as Yang Heung-su

Byeong-mu's father who works as a cleaning team leader at Mucheon Sarang Hospital. He may seem timid and reserved, but he is a determined father who devoted himself to his son.

- Lee Doo-il as Shin Chu-ho

Min-su's father. He worked as a chef at Mucheon Garden, which was run by Jeong-woo's family, but after the incident, he took over the restaurant and is now running it as a proper neighborhood restaurant.

- Lee Jung-eun as Kim Jeong-suk

Min-su's mother. She prides herself on being a neighborhood insider, but she is completely unaware of important issues.

==== Other ====
- Jang Won-young as Kim Hee-do

Gu-tak's right-hand man. He may not be overconfident in his experience now, but 10 years ago, he was a capable and passionate detective who was in charge of the Jeong-woo case. He was promoted to the head of the criminal investigation department for his contribution in solving the case, and he is the epitome of an excellent second-in-command who perfectly serves his senior Gu-tak and controls his junior detectives.

== Production ==
=== Development ===
Black Out was developed under the working title Snow White Must Die, which is based on the German novel of the same name by Nele Neuhaus. Produced by Hidden Sequence and began the pre-production in 2021. It was reported that writer Seo Joo-yeon and director Lee Kyu-man would team up and that the series would be organized as a Wavve original. Production company RaemongRaein announced that the series is among the six works they planned to produce. Film director Byun Young-joo confirmed as the new director and also marked her small screen debut.

In 2022, Wavve confirmed that the series was part of their drama lineup.

In 2023, RaemongRaein confirmed that the series would broadcast in the second half of the year.

=== Casting ===
In 2021, it was reported that Byun Yo-han was cast for the main role of the series and this would be his first drama in three years since Mr. Sunshine in 2018. The next month, Go Bo-gyeol was cast for the female lead role. Kim Bo-ra and Ko Jun were reportedly cast in October and November, respectively.

In June 2024, Byun, Ko, Go, and Kim confirmed as the lead actors of the series.

=== Filming ===
Principal photography began in the second half of 2021 and concluded in June 2022.

== Release ==
Black Out was invited to the non-competitive section and had a world premiere in the Rendez-Vous section of the 2024 Canneseries. It also received attention from potential viewers around the world for its dense story, excellent directing, and solid acting skills.

MBC TV confirmed the broadcast date of the series to be on August 16, 2024, and airs every Friday and Saturday at 21:50 (KST). It is also available to stream on Wavve and Coupang Play.

== Viewership ==
Black Out : South Korea viewers per episode (thousands)

Season	Episode number														Average
Season	1	2	3	4	5	6	7	8	9	10	11	12	13	14	Average
1	484	N/A	748	658	726	752	873	1033	1042	980	1471	1351	1491	1395	929

Source: Audience measurement performed nationwide by Nielsen Korea. (Note: This average data is calculated based on the published number of viewerships and ratings, respectively. The exact average number of viewership and rating are unknown due to an unpublished data.)

Average TV viewership ratings
Ep.	Original broadcast date	Average audience share	
Ep.	Original broadcast date	Nielsen Korea	
Ep.	Original broadcast date	Nationwide	Seoul
1	August 16, 2024	2.8% (18th)	2.6% (19th)
2	August 17, 2024	2.7% (25th)	N/A
3	August 23, 2024	4.6% (11th)	4.4% (12th)
4	August 24, 2024	4.4% (13th)	3.8% (14th)
5	August 30, 2024	5.1% (11th)	4.7% (11th)
6	August 31, 2024	4.8% (7th)	4.2% (10th)
7	September 6, 2024	5.7% (9th)	5.7% (9th)
8	September 7, 2024	6.4% (3rd)	6.1% (3rd)
9	September 13, 2024	6.5% (7th)	6.4% (8th)
10	September 20, 2024	6.1% (9th)	5.9% (9th)
11	September 21, 2024	8.7% (3rd)	8.5% (3rd)
12	September 27, 2024	7.9% (5th)	7.5% (3rd)
13	September 28, 2024	8.6% (3rd)	8.2% (3rd)
14	October 4, 2024	8.8% (3rd)	8.2% (3rd)
Average		5.9%	5.9%
In the table above, the blue numbers represent the lowest ratings and the red numbers represent the highest ratings.; N/A denotes ratings that were not published.

== Accolades ==
=== Listicles ===
Name of publisher, year listed, name of listicle, and placement
Publisher	Year	Listicle	Placement	Ref.
Cine21	2024	Top 10 Series of 2024	9th place	
South China Morning Post	2024	The 15 best K-dramas of 2024	4th place	
