= Hi Bye, Mama! =

2020 South Korean television series

- Promotional poster
- Hangul: 하이바이, 마마!
- RR: Haibai, mama!
- MR: Haibai, mama!
- Genre: Tragicomedy; Fantasy; Melodrama
- Created by: Studio Dragon
- Written by: Kwon Hye-joo
- Directed by: Yoo Je-won
- Starring: Kim Tae-hee; Lee Kyu-hyung; Go Bo-gyeol
- Music by: Lim Ha-young
- Country of origin: South Korea
- Original language: Korean
- No. of episodes: 16

Production
- Executive producer: Kim Kyun-hong
- Producers: Lee Seung-hee; Park Ji-hyun; Yoo Sung-min
- Running time: 62–86 minutes
- Production company: MI Inc.

Original release
- Network: tvN
- Release: February 22 – April 19, 2020

Hi Bye, Mama! (Korean: 하이바이, 마마!) is a 2020 South Korean television series starring Kim Tae-hee, Lee Kyu-hyung, and Go Bo-gyeol. It aired on tvN from February 22 to April 19, 2020. It was also released on Netflix.

== Synopsis ==
Cha Yu-ri (Kim Tae-hee) has been a ghost since she died in a tragic accident five years ago. Through a reincarnation project, she is given the possibility to become human again if she succeeds in going back to her place within 49 days. However, her husband, Cho Gang-hwa (Lee Kyu-hyung), is now remarried. She has to choose between her own or her husband's happiness.

== Cast ==
=== Main ===
- Kim Tae-hee as Cha Yu-ri

She becomes a lingering ghost after getting hit by a car while 9 months pregnant. After being taken to the hospital where her husband works, her daughter is saved, however Yu-ri is unable to survive. Four years later, Yu-ri becomes human again after having an emotional outburst towards God for the tragedy that befell her, and is granted 49 days to regain her place as Gang-hwa's wife and her daughter's mother in order to be able to stay permanently. If she is unable to do so, she must willfully go to heaven and reincarnate.

- Lee Kyu-hyung as Cho Gang-hwa

A well off doctor and former surgeon. After his wife's death, he begins to distance himself from reality, becoming depressed. He develops a trauma of surgery after losing his pregnant wife because he was unreachable and locked up in an operating room.

- Go Bo-gyeol as Oh Min-jung

Gang-hwa's new wife, who later discovers Gang-hwa's true feelings and about Yu-ri's resurrection. Current mother figure of Yu-ri's daughter Seo-woo.

=== Supporting ===
==== Yu-ri's family and entourage ====
- Seo Woo-jin as Cho Seo-woo, Gang-Hwa and Yu-ri's daughter.
  - Park Jung-yeon as teenager Cho Seo-woo (Ep. 16)
- Kim Mi-kyung as Jeon Eun-sook, Yu-ri's mother.
- Park Soo-young as Cha Moo-poong, Yu-ri's father.
- Kim Mi-soo as Cha Yeon-ji, Yu-ri's little sister.
- Shin Dong-mi as Go Hyun-jung, Yu-ri's best friend.
- Yoon Sa-bong as Mi Dong-daek, a shaman.
- Lee Si-woo as Jang Pil-seung, an airline pilot.

==== People around Gang-hwa ====
- Oh Eui-shik as Gye Geun-sang, Gang-hwa's best friend.
- Ahn Nae-sang as Professor Jang, Gang-hwa's chief.

==== Ghosts at the ossuary ====
- Ban Hyo-jung as Jung Gwi-sun, died 7 years ago.
- Bae Hae-sun as Sung Mi-ja, Man-seok's wife died 55 years ago.
- Choi Dae-sung as Kwon Man-seok, Mi-ja's husband, died 56 years ago.
- Park Eun-hye as Seo Bong-yeon, Pil-seung's mother who died 22 years ago.
- Kim Dae-gon as Jang Dae-choon, Pil-seung's father who died 22 years ago.
- Shin Soo-yeon as Jang Young-shim, Pil-seung's sister who died 22 years ago.
- Lee Jae-woo as Kang Sang-bong, former baseball player who was murdered.
- Shim Wan-joon as Shim Geum-jae, died 6 years ago.
- Bae Yoon-kyung as Park Hye-jin, died 4 years ago.
- Shin Cheol-jin as Mr.Choe

=== Special appearances ===
- Lee Ji-ha as Park Hye-jin's mother
- Yoo Yeon as Mi-so's mother
- Lee Joong-ok as apartment ghost (Ep. 1 & 10)
- Lee Jung-eun as shaman (Ep. 4 & 10) (Note: Lee Jung-eun and Kim Seul-gi reprised their roles from the 2015 television series Oh My Ghost which was helmed by the same director as Hi Bye, Mama!)
- Lee Dae-yeon as Kim Pan-seok (Ep. 7 & 9)
- Lee Byung-joon as Baek Sam-dong (Ep. 7 & 9)
- Kim Seul-gi as Shin Soon-ae (Ep. 10)
- Yang Kyung-won as an exorcist (Ep. 10–15)

== Production ==
Early working title of the series is Goodbye Mom (Korean: 안녕 엄마).

Kim Tae-hee and Bae Hae-seon have worked together in the SBS Drama Yong-pal in 2015.

== Original soundtrack ==
Hi Bye, Mama! OST

Soundtrack album by Various Artists
- Released: 2020
- Genre: Soundtrack
- Languages: Korean; English
- Label: Stone Music Entertainment

=== Part 1 ===
Released on March 1, 2020
| No. | Title | Lyrics | Music | Artist | Length |
|---|---|---|---|---|---|
| 1. | "Time, Like a Shining Star" (별처럼 빛나는 시간) | Son Go-eun (MonoTree) | Son Go-eun (MonoTree) | Park Ji-min | 3:18 |
| 2. | "Time, Like a Shining Star" (Inst.) | | Son Go-eun (MonoTree) | | 3:18 |
| Total length: | | | | | 6:36 |

=== Part 2 ===
Released on March 8, 2020
| No. | Title | Lyrics | Music | Artist | Length |
|---|---|---|---|---|---|
| 1. | "Touch" | Park Geun-chul; Dani; Jung Su-min | Park Geun-chul; Jung Su-min | Kim Young-geun | 4:49 |
| 2. | "Touch" (Inst.) | | Park Geun-chul; Jung Su-min | | 4:49 |
| Total length: | | | | | 9:38 |

=== Part 3 ===
Released on March 15, 2020
| No. | Title | Lyrics | Music | Artist | Length |
|---|---|---|---|---|---|
| 1. | "To You" (너에게) | Hen | Hen | Hen | 3:44 |
| 2. | "To You" (Inst.) | | Hen | | 3:44 |
| Total length: | | | | | 7:28 |

=== Part 4 ===
Released on March 22, 2020
| No. | Title | Lyrics | Music | Artist | Length |
|---|---|---|---|---|---|
| 1. | "Hopefully Sky" (하늘바라기) | Duble Sidekick; Jung Eun-ji; Long Candy | Duble Sidekick; Jung Eun-ji; Long Candy | Sohyang | 4:30 |
| 2. | "Hopefully Sky" (Inst.) | | Duble Sidekick; Jung Eun-ji; Long Candy | | 4:30 |
| Total length: | | | | | 9:00 |

=== Part 5 ===
Released on April 12, 2020
| No. | Title | Lyrics | Music | Artist | Length |
|---|---|---|---|---|---|
| 1. | "In The Night" | Jayins; Han Jae-wan | Jayins; Han Jae-wan | Parc Jae-jung | 4:20 |
| 2. | "In The Night" (Inst.) | | Jayins; Han Jae-wan | | 4:20 |
| Total length: | | | | | 8:40 |

== Viewership ==
Hi Bye, Mama! : South Korea viewers per episode (millions)

| Season | Episode number | | | | | | | | | | | | | | | | Average |
| Season | 1 | 2 | 3 | 4 | 5 | 6 | 7 | 8 | 9 | 10 | 11 | 12 | 13 | 14 | 15 | 16 | Average |
|---|---|---|---|---|---|---|---|---|---|---|---|---|---|---|---|---|---|
| 1 | 1.614 | 1.658 | 1.583 | 1.915 | 1.693 | 1.702 | 1.860 | 1.550 | 1.568 | 1.678 | 1.492 | 1.577 | 1.240 | 1.273 | 1.232 | 1.512 | 1.572 |

Source: Audience measurement performed nationwide by Nielsen Korea.

Average TV viewership ratings
| Ep. | Original broadcast date | Title | Average audience share (Nielsen Korea) | |
| Ep. | Original broadcast date | Title | Nationwide | Seoul |
|---|---|---|---|---|
| 1 | February 22, 2020 | Life is Full of Unpredictable Surprises (인생은 예측 불가능의 연속이다) | 5.895% | 6.209% |
| 2 | February 23, 2020 | Forgotten Season (잊혀진 계절) | 6.111% | 6.220% |
| 3 | February 29, 2020 | Realizing the Beauty of Life is Only Possible After Death (죽어보니, 알 수 있는 것들 '美生') | 5.373% | 5.384% |
| 4 | March 1, 2020 | There is Nothing That Won't Happen to Me (나에게 일어나지 않을 일은 없다) | 6.519% | 6.793% |
| 5 | March 7, 2020 | Every Moment When Chance Turns Into Fate (우연이 운명으로 변하는 모든 순간들) | 5.663% | 5.971% |
| 6 | March 8, 2020 | Even in the Face of Death, Family is Still My Number One (죽음 앞에서도 나만 생각하지 않게 하는 것 '가족') | 5.769% | 5.745% |
| 7 | March 14, 2020 | Where Flower Blooms and Falls (꽃이 피고 진 자리) | 6.101% | 5.958% |
| 8 | March 15, 2020 | People Who Can't Say Goodbye (이별에 서툰 사람들) | 5.428% | 5.550% |
| 9 | March 21, 2020 | Goodbye and Hello to Your Light (안녕, 당신의 빛) | 5.859% | 6.122% |
| 10 | March 22, 2020 | Your Place Where I Cannot Reach (내가 닿을 수 없는 당신의 자리') | 5.431% | 5.930% |
| 11 | March 28, 2020 | The Share of Life Given to Me (내게 주어진 '내 몫의 인생') | 5.324% | 6.025% |
| 12 | March 29, 2020 | The Days I Was Forgotten (내가 가려진 날들) | 5.227% | 5.517% |
| 13 | April 11, 2020 | A Story I Could Not See (나는 볼 수 없었던 이야기) | 4.707% | 5.086% |
| 14 | April 12, 2020 | It's Not Your Fault (당신 탓이 아니다) | 4.226% | 4.460% |
| 15 | April 18, 2020 | My Life's Tomorrow (내 인생의 '내일') | 4.795% | 5.178% |
| 16 | April 19, 2020 | Petals Fall, But the Flower Endures (꽃잎이 떨어져도 꽃은 지지 않네) | 5.133% | 5.737% |
| Average | | | 5.473% | 5.743% |
In the table above, the blue numbers represent the lowest ratings and the red numbers represent the highest ratings.; This drama aired on a cable channel/pay TV which normally has a relatively smaller audience compared to free-to-air TV/public broadcasters (KBS, SBS, MBC and EBS).; On March 29, 2020, it was reported that the drama would take a week-long break from broadcasts on April 4 and 5 due to inevitable changes in the schedule and to ensure a more stable production process. Special broadcasts were aired instead.
