= Seire (film) =

- Directed by: Park Kang
- Written by: Park Kang
- Starring: Seo Hyun-woo; Ryu Abel; Shim Eun-woo; Ko Eun-min; Kim Woo-kyum
- Distributed by: Film Movement
- Release date: October 2021 (Busan International Film Festival)
- Running time: 102 minutes
- Country: South Korea
- Language: Korean

Seire (Korean: 세이레) is a 2021 South Korean horror film directed by Park Kang and starring Seo Hyun-woo, Ryu Abel, Shim Eun-woo, Ko Eun-min and Kim Woo-kyum.

== Cast ==
- Seo Hyun-woo as Woo-jin
- Ryu Abel
- Song Duk-ho as Intravenous Patient
- Shim Eun-woo
- Ko Eun-min
- Kim Woo-kyum
- Seo Jin-won as President of the Health Center

== Release ==
The film premiered at the 26th Busan International Film Festival in October 2021. The film will receive a theatrical release in 2022.

== Reception ==
Seire won the FIPRESCI award at the 26th Busan International Film Festival.

Alain Elliot of Nerdly rated the film 4 stars out of 5, calling it "the perfect showcase of how to blend old tales and folklore in a modern setting and telling real stories that are relevant now".

Chad Collins of Dread Central rated the film 3.5 stars out of 5, calling it "a haunting, austere ghost story."

Neil Young of Screen Daily wrote a positive review of the film, stating that it "balances psychological probings and potentially supernatural elements in deliberately disorienting and accomplished fashion."

Panos Kotzathanasis of HanCinema gave the film a positive review, writing, "The overall minimalism with the occasional splashes of visually impressive moments appears to be a well-fitted approach for the "new generation" of horror films, along with the combination of a number of art-house elements, as the richness in context."

Sean Parker of Horror Obsessive wrote a positive review of the film.
