= La Mante =

2017 French thriller miniseries

- Genre: Thriller
- Created by: Alice Chegaray-Breugnot; Nicolas Jean; Grégoire Demaison; Laurent Vivier
- Directed by: Alexandre Laurent
- Composer: François Lietout
- Country of origin: France
- Original language: French

Production
- Producer: Septembre Production

Original release
- Network: TF1
- Release: September 2017 – September 2017

La Mante (transl. "The Mantis") is a French thriller miniseries, that debuted on Netflix on 30 December 2017 after airing on TF1 during September 2017. It was released on Netflix France on 13 October 2017.

== Premise ==
In Paris, police search for a psychopath whose murders are inspired by Jeanne Deber, known as "The Mantis," a famous serial killer who terrorised the country 25 years ago. Jeanne Deber offers her expertise to the police in order to help hunt down the copycat. Placed in solitary confinement since her arrest, "The Mantis" has one condition: to deal only with Detective Damien Carrot, her estranged son. Damien has no choice, for a serial killer is on the loose and could strike anytime, anywhere in Paris.

== Cast ==
- Carole Bouquet as Jeanne Deber / The Mantis
- Fred Testot as Damien Carrot
- Jaques Weber as Charles Carrot
- Pascal Demolon as Dominique Feracci
- Manon Azem as Lucie Carrot
- Serge Riaboukine as Crozet
- Robinson Stevenin as Alex Crozet
- Fredérique Bel as Virginie Delorme
- Elodie Navarre as Szofia Kovacs
- Adama Niane as Stern
- Yannick Samot as Bertrand
- Steve Tran as Achille
- Julien Tortora as Gallieni

== Adaptations ==
- A South Korean adaptation titled as Queen Mantis was produced by Mega Monster, Merry Christmas and Docu-Factory Vista, in partnership with Studio S for SBS TV. Go Hyun-jung and Jang Dong-yoon were confirmed for lead roles. It aired on SBS TV from September 5 to 27, 2025 for eight episodes.
- An Indian remake titled Mrs. Deshpande was produced by Applause Entertainment and Kukunoor Movies. Madhuri Dixit plays the titular lead role. It was released on JioHotstar on December 19, 2025.
