= Hidden Sequence =

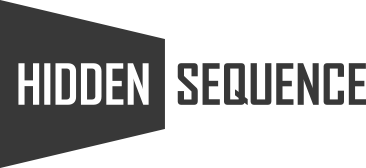
- Hidden Sequence logo
- Native name: 히든시퀀스
- Type: Private
- Genre: Korean drama
- Founded: December 2016
- Founder: Lee Jae-moon
- Headquarters: 2F Yurim B/D 24, Hannam-dong 42-gil, Yongsan-gu, Seoul, South Korea
- Key people: Lee Jae-moon (founder and CEO)
- Products: TV series
- Services: TV series production
- Website: www.hiddens.co.kr

Hidden Sequence (Korean: 히든시퀀스) is a Korean drama production company, founded by Misaeng and Signal producer Lee Jae-moon in December 2016 shortly after he resigned from the cable network tvN.

== List of works ==
=== Drama ===
Year	Title	Original title	Network	Associated production	Ref.
2017	Save Me	구해줘	OCN	Studio Dragon (series developer)	
2017	Sweet Revenge	복수노트	oksusu	Blue Panda Mediatainment	
2018	Sweet Revenge 2	복수노트 2	oksusu, XtvN	—N/a	
2019	Save Me 2	구해줘 2: 사이비	OCN	Studio Dragon (series developer)	
2019	Drama Stage 2020: My Uncle is Audrey Hepburn	드라마 스테이지 2020 - 삼촌은 오드리헵번	tvN	Studio Dragon	
2020	Drama Stage 2020: My Husband Has a Kim Hee Sun	드라마 스테이지 2020 - 남편에게 김희선이 생겼어요	tvN	Studio Dragon	
2020	Drama Stage 2020: Out of Communication Range	드라마 스테이지 2020 - 통화권이탈	tvN	Studio Dragon	
2021	Imitation	아미테이션	KBS 2TV	KBS Drama Production, KakaoPage (series developer)	
2024	Black Out	백설공주에게 죽음을	MBC TV	RaemongRaein	
TBA	Psyche	싸이키	TBA	TBA	

=== Movie ===
Year	Title	Original title	Distributor	Associated production	Ref.
2025	My Favorite Love Story	어쩌면 해피엔딩	Ascendio Entertainment; KinoFilm; Roadshow Plus; Special Movie City	—N/a	
