= Nele Neuhaus =

German writer (born 1967)

Nele Neuhaus at the Frankfurt Book Fair 2026

Cornelia Neuhaus (born 20 June 1967 in Münster as Cornelia Löwenberg) is a German writer. She is best known for her crime thrillers set in the Taunus near Frankfurt.

She has also published romantic novels under her maiden name Löwenberg, as well as pony books for teenagers.

== Bibliography ==
- Unter Haien (Swimming With Sharks)
- Sommer der Wahrheit (as Nele Löwenberg)
- Straße nach Nirgendwo (as Nele Löwenberg)

=== Bodenstein/Kirchhoff series ===
- Eine unbeliebte Frau (#1 An Unpopular Woman - published 2019)
- Mordsfreunde (#2 Murder Friends - published 2019)
- Tiefe Wunden (#3 The Ice Queen / Deep Wounds - published 2019)
- Schneewittchen muss sterben (#4 Snow White Must Die - published 2010)
- Wer Wind sät (#5 Who Sows the Wind - published 2012)
- Böser Wolf (#6 Bad Wolf / Big Bad Wolf - published 2013)
- Die Lebenden und die Toten (#7 I Am Your Judge / To Catch a Killer / The Living and the Dead - published 2015)
- Im Wald (#8 In The Forest - published 2017)
- Muttertag (#9 Mother's Day - published 2019)
- In ewiger Freundschaft (#10 published 2021)
- Monster (#11 published 2023)
