= Mega Monster =

Korean drama production company

Mega Monster Corporation
- Mega Monster's logo
- Formerly: Story Plant Co., Ltd. (2014–2017)
- Type: Subsidiary (private)
- Industry: entertainment and media production
- Founded: November 20, 2014; 11 years ago in Goyang-si, Gyeonggi-do, South Korea
- Founder: Kim Yang; Koo Bon-geun
- Headquarters: Sangam DMC Digital Cube 20/F, 34 Sangamsan-ro, Sangam-dong, Mapo-gu, Seoul, South Korea
- Area served: Worldwide
- Key people: Kim Yong-jin (President & CEO)
- Products: Dramas; Variety shows Soundtracks
- Services: Production, marketing and distribution of Korean dramas and other entertainment programs Management of writers and directors Soundtrack production
- Owner: As of March 31, 2022: Kakao Entertainment (94.14%); Studio Dragon (5.86%)
- Parent: CJ E&M (2014–2017); Kakao M (2017–2021); Kakao Entertainment (2021–present)
- Korean: 메가몬스터 주식회사; RR: Megamonseuteo Jusikhoesa
- Website: megamon.co.kr (Note: Formerly megamon.dweb.co.kr until December 30, 2019. Changed to the current web domain after the end of the company's contract with a local website operator. However, the email addresses related to the company use the @megamon.co.kr domain.)

Mega Monster (Note: Also credited as MEGA MONSTER by kakao M on on-air credits since episode 16 of Children of Nobody) (Korean: 메가몬스터; RR: Megamonseuteo) is a South Korean TV series production company and a subsidiary of Kakao Entertainment.

The company was founded in 2014 as Story Plant by Kim Yang and Koo Bon-geun, and was a subsidiary of CJ E&M (known now as CJ ENM). In 2017, it was fully acquired by Kakao Entertainment's predecessor Kakao M. Since then, a portion of the stake has been acquired by KakaoPage Corp. (another predecessor of Kakao Entertainment) and Studio Dragon, a subsidiary of CJ Group.

== History ==
- November 20, 2014: Story Plant was founded in Goyang City by former SBS and MBC producers Kim Yang and Koo Bon-geun (who was the company's first CEO). CJ E&M acquired it later on.
- January 9, 2015: Heart to Heart, a 16-episode TV series, premiered on tvN. It was the company's first production, in cooperation with Chorokbaem Media.
- May 4, 2015: A Bird That Doesn't Sing, a 100-episode TV series, was aired on tvN.
- June 29, 2015: We Broke Up, a 10-episode web series based on the same-titled Naver WEBTOON, was distributed by Naver TV, and later aired on OnStyle. It was produced in association with then-parent CJ E&M and YGKPlus.
- February 27, 2016: Happy Home, a 51-episode TV series, was aired by MBC TV.
- May 10, 2017: LOEN Entertainment (now Kakao Entertainment), a subsidiary of Kakao, acquired Story Plant from CJ E&M, as well as the distribution and licensing rights to its productions (from the latter's subsidiary Studio Dragon). The amount of the deal was not disclosed, and co-founders Kim and Koo decided to leave the company. Later on, LOEN's sister company Podotree (now KakaoPage) and Studio Dragon acquired 21.90% and 10.95% of the company's shares, respectively, for strategic investment. LOEN's Video Content Company head Lee Jun-ho became its new CEO. It also moved its headquarters from Goyang City to Seoul.
- July 11, 2017: The company's name was officially changed from Story Plant Co., Ltd. to Mega Monster Corporation.
- November 21, 2018: Children of Nobody, a 32-episode (Note: In order to circumvent Korean laws that prevent commercial breaks in the middle of an episode, what would previously have been aired as single 70 minute episodes are now being repackaged as two 35 minute episodes, with two episodes being shown each night with a commercial break between them.) TV series, was aired on MBC TV. It was the company's first production since the management and name change. Former SBS and JS Pictures executive Kim Yong-jin co-executive produced the series with Lee, marking his first project since becoming the company's vice-president and COO the same year.
- February 6, 2019: Touch Your Heart, a 16-episode TV series based on the KakaoPage web novel of the same title, aired its first episode on tvN. It was co-produced by Zium Content, and developed by Studio Dragon.
- April 1, 2019: The company became the newest sponsor of the "Find the Desert's Shooting Star" Drama Screenplay Competition organized by the Broadcasting Content Promotion Foundation (BCPF).
- April 3, 2019: Children of Nobody was nominated for Best Drama and Best Television Screenplay in the 55th Baeksang Arts Awards, being the only drama from a free-to-air broadcast network to get these nominations. These are also the first-ever nominations got by Mega Monster as a production company.
- June 11, 2019: Mega Monster, Daum Webtoon Company (a division of KakaoPage) and the KBS Drama Production Group signed a memorandum of agreement and understanding (MOAU) for drama production at the KBS Yeouido office. The MOAU states that the three camps will produce dramas based on Daum webtoons for three years. The first project under this agreement, the TV drama adaptation of GAR2 and Teacher Oh's webtoon Dead Man's Letter, will be aired in 2020.
- March 30, 2020: Fatal Promise, a 100-episode daily TV series, premiered on KBS 2TV. Kim Yong-jin and his former SBS colleague Sohn Jae-sung (who joined the company a few months earlier) are the executive producers.
- April 6, 2020: How to Buy a Friend, an eight-episode miniseries, aired its first two episodes also on KBS 2TV. It is based on Kwon Laad's webtoon of the same title, which was first published in 2018 on Daum Webtoon.
- May 4, 2020: Mom Has an Affair (co-produced by Studio S), a 120-episode daily morning drama about a single mom looking for a rich man that can be a father to her kids, premiered on SBS TV. Singer-actress Hyun Jyu-ni (on her first-ever TV series leading role throughout her career) and actor Lee Jae-hwang portray the lead roles.
- August 21, 2020: Former Studio Dragon chief finance officer Jang Sai-jung was appointed as the company's new president and chief executive officer, replacing Lee Jun-ho.

== Production works ==
=== Scripted programming ===
Year	Title	Network	Associated Production	Note
2015	Heart to Heart	tvN	Chorokbaem Media	
2015	A Bird That Doesn't Sing	tvN	—N/a	
2015	We Broke Up	Naver TV Cast; OnStyle	CJ E&M; YGKPlus	based on the Naver/Line WEBTOON webtoon by Ryu Chae-rin
2016	Happy Home	MBC TV	—N/a	
2018	Children of Nobody	MBC TV	—N/a	
2019	Touch Your Heart (Note: Developed by Studio Dragon)	tvN	Zium Content	based on the KakaoPage web novel and webtoon by Jäger and Ant Studio
2020	Fatal Promise	KBS 2TV	—N/a	
2020	How to Buy a Friend	KBS 2TV	—N/a	based on the Daum webtoon by Laad Kwon
2020	Mom Has an Affair	SBS TV	Studio S	
2022-2023	The First Responders	SBS TV	Studio S	Seasons 1-2
2025	Queen Mantis	SBS TV	Studio S; Merry Christmas; Docu-Factory Vista	local adaptation of the 2017 French TV series La Mante
TBA	Dead Man's Letter (literal translation)	KBS 2TV	—N/a	based on the Daum webtoon by GAR2 and Teacher Oh

=== Non-scripted programming ===
Year	Title	Network	Associated Production	Note
2020	Miss Back	MBN	Space Rabbit	first non-scripted program production
2021	The Ant and The Grasshopper	MBN	—N/a	
2025	House of Girls	ENA	Contents Brick Co. Ltd.	

== Current managed people ==
=== Directors ===
- Oh Sang-won
- Park Jin-pyo (Note: Listed as a writer on the company's homepage.)
- Kim Dae-jin
- Min Yeon-hong
- Lee Jung-hoon

=== Screenwriters ===
- Nam Sang-wook
- Yoon Sung-hee
- Jo Eun-jung
- Ma Joo-hee
- Kim Yi-young
- Min Ji-eun

== See also ==
- Kakao
- CJ Group
- Kakao M
- KakaoPage
- Kakao Entertainment
  - Logos Film
  - Story & Pictures Media
- CJ ENM
  - CJ ENM Entertainment Division
  - JS Pictures
- Studio Dragon
  - Culture Depot
  - Hwa&Dam Pictures
