= Temptation of Wife =

Temptation of Wife may refer to:

- Temptation of Wife (South Korean TV series), a 2008 television series
- Temptation of Wife (Philippine TV series), a 2012 television series
