= List of Temptation of Wife episodes =

Temptation of Wife is a 2012 Philippine television drama revenge series broadcast by GMA Network. The series is based on a 2008 South Korean drama series of the same title. It premiered on the network's Telebabad line up from October 29, 2012 to April 5, 2013, replacing Luna Blanca.

Mega Manila ratings are provided by AGB Nielsen Philippines.

== Series overview ==
Month	Episodes	Monthly Averages
Month	Episodes	Mega Manila
October 2012	3	22.2%
November 2012	22	20.7%
December 2012	21	21.9%
January 2013	23	26.3%
February 2013	20	24.6%
March 2013	19	23.0%
April 2013	5	25.5%
Total	113	23.5%

== Episodes ==
=== October 2012 ===
No.	Title	Original air date	AGB Nielsen Ratings (Mega Manila)	Timeslot Rank	Primetime Rank	Ref.
1	"Marcel Meets Angeline"	October 29, 2012	23.5%	#2	#4	
The campus playboy, Marcel, seems to be captivated with the beauty of junior student Angeline. Will he be able to win the heart of the latter?
2	"Angeline and Marcel Tie the Knot"	October 30, 2012	22.6%	#1	#4	
Heidi's resentment for her friend Angeline grew even bigger because of the latter's marriage with Marcel, whom she has feelings for. Will this jealousy affect their friendship?
3	"Angeline Becomes a Barren Wife"	October 31, 2012	20.5%	#1	#5	
Five years after suffering from miscarriage, Angeline seems to have a problem in conceiving a baby. Will she be able to give Marcel his most-awaited child?

=== November 2012 ===
No.	Title	Original air date	AGB Nielsen Ratings (Mega Manila)	Timeslot Rank	Primetime Rank	Ref.
4	"Angeline Struggles To Be a Perfect Wife"	November 1, 2012	19.0%	#1	#5	
Trying her best as a wife for Marcel, Angeline exerts more effort to meet the former's expectations but things are hard for her to simply fit into her husband's life.
5	"Flirting With My Best friend's Husband"	November 2, 2012	20.1%	#1	#8	
Heidi will use her beauty and fortune to seduce Marcel and steal him from Angeline’s hands.
6	"Angeline Reunites With Her Snake Best Friend"	November 5, 2012	21.4%	#1	#5	
Angeline gets surprised when her best friend Heidi unexpectedly visited their house to convince her that Marcel is not really the man for her.
7	"Wild Day With the Sultry Mistress"	November 6, 2012	20.7%	#1	#6	
Marcel receives an invite to visit Heidi but much to his surprise, the latter prepared a special plan to seduce him again. Will he give in to her temptation?
8	"Perks of Being a Mistress"	November 7, 2012	18.8%	#2	#8	
After being gifted with a brand-new car and a condominium unit, Heidi expresses her immense gratitude for Marcel by attending to his intimate needs.
9	"The Wife Meets Her Husband's Mistress"	November 8, 2012	21.4%	#2	#7	
Marcel thought that Heidi prepared a special treat for him at the condo but he didn't know that her wife, Angeline, was also there. What will he do if the latter finds out that he's spending time with her best friend?
10	"Marcel Gets Torn Between Two Women"	November 9, 2012	19.4%	#1	#8	
On the night of their wedding anniversary, Angeline is patiently waiting at home for her husband while Heidi invited Marcel on her condominium for an intimate experience. Who will the latter choose between the two women?
11	"Angeline Confronts Her Unfaithful Husband"	November 12, 2012	19.4%	#2	#8	
To clarify Heidi’s cheating accusation towards Marcel, Angeline decided to confront her husband.
12	"Cheating Husband Gets Busted"	November 13, 2012	21.5%	#1	#6	
Angeline tried to follow Marcel’s whereabouts to find out if her husband is really cheating on her. Will she finally catch him with his mistress?
13	"The Mistress Next Door"	November 14, 2012	20.0%	#1	#7	
During his romantic vacation with Angeline, Marcel found out that his mistress Heidi was also staying at the same location. Will this sweet vacation turn into a nightmare full of sins?
14	"Wrath of the Vengeful Wife"	November 15, 2012	21.7%	#1	#5	
Due to her suspicions that her husband is cheating, Angeline started to barge in every room of the resort just to find Marcel and his mistress.
15	"Romeo Beats the Hell Out of Marcel"	November 16, 2012	22.2%	#1	#4	
Marcel’s biggest fear became a reality when his father Romeo received the terrible news that his son is cheating on his own wife, Angeline.
16	"The Deceitful Husband Becomes Loyal"	November 19, 2012	20.9%	#1	#5	
Marcel decided to fix his marriage after Angeline found out his secret affair. Will his wife accept him again?
17	"Marcel's Suspected Mistress"	November 20, 2012	19.5%	#1	#7	
Angeline became suspicious of her best friend Heidi after finding out that the ring from her lover matches the evidence of Marcel's.
18	"A Taste of the Wife's Vengeance"	November 21, 2012	21.6%	#1	#4	
Now that the identity of her husband's mistress got revealed right in front of Angeline, Heidi gets to reap the consequence of her actions towards Marcel.
19	"Triumph of the Mistress"	November 22, 2012	21.3%	#1	#6	
After Marcel chose to stay with Heidi, she felt rightful enough to belittle Angeline as a boring and worthless wife.
20	"Marcel Gets Caught in the Act"	November 23, 2012	22.5%	#1	#2	
Driven by anger, Leo immediately beats up Marcel upon seeing him making out with Heidi in public.
21	"Karma of the Cheating Husband"	November 26, 2012	20.2%	#1	#6	
Due to his weak and wounded condition, Marcel couldn’t fight back Leo’s immense rage against him and helplessly accepts the consequence of his infidelity.
22	"Marcel Demands a Selfish Request"	November 27, 2012	20.9%	#1	#6	
Marcel tries to take advantage of Angeline by making a deal to take responsibility of her family’s miserable state in exchange of letting him and Heidi continue their illicit relationship.
23	"Angeline Gets Left With No Choice"	November 28, 2012	19.5%	#1	#5	
In hopes to help her mother recover from her condition, Angeline was left with no other choice but to accept Marcel’s selfish offer.
24	"Legal Wife Versus the Mistress"	November 29, 2012	21.4%	#1	#4	
Now that they all live together under one roof, can Angeline prohibit Heidi from seducing her husband Marcel?
25	"When the Wife is Away, the Mistress Will Play"	November 30, 2012	21.2%	#1	#4	
While Angeline is away, Heidi will force her way to sleep around with Marcel. Will the latter allow his mistress to stay with him?

=== December 2012 ===
No.	Title	Original air date	AGB Nielsen Ratings (Mega Manila)	Timeslot Rank	Primetime Rank	Ref.
26	"Truth Unfolds in Front of Stella"	December 3, 2012	20.5%	#1	#6	
Stella gets surprised when she witnessed the sexual affair of her son Marcel and Heidi. Will she tolerate their infidelity?
27	"Angeline Gives Up On Marcel"	December 4, 2012	21.2%	#1	#5	
Even though they have an arrangement, Angeline chooses to leave Marcel because she can no longer tolerate his unfaithfulness.
28	"Romeo Warns Marcel for the Last Time"	December 5, 2012	22.6%	#1	#2	
Now that Romeo found out the truth about his son’s infidelity, Marcel got beaten up and received an ultimatum from his father to end his relationship with his mistress or else, he will lose all his fortune.
29	"Marcel Tries to Win Back Angeline"	December 6, 2012	23.7%	#1	#4	
To regain his father’s trust, Marcel will do what it takes to win Angeline back for good.
30	"Angeline Falls Into Her Husband's Trap"	December 7, 2012	23.0%	#1	#3	
Moved by Marcel’s pitiful situation, Angeline has immediately forgiven her husband’s unfaithfulness and is ready to begin a new life with him.
31	"A Disastrous Night for Marcel and Angeline"	December 10, 2012	21.9%	#1	#5	
Angeline’s romantic date with Marcel ends in a disaster as Heidi barges in with a devastating news for the former. What could this be?
32	"Is Angeline Sabotaging Heidi's Pregnancy?"	December 11, 2012	19.9%	#1	#4	
Clueless with Heidi almost suffering from miscarriage, Angeline gets blamed for sabotaging the mistress’ high-risk pregnancy.
33	"It's a Victory for the Mistress"	December 12, 2012	20.1%	#1	#4	
Angeline sadly lost the trust of Romeo and Marcel when Heidi claimed that she was abused and beaten by the former.
34	"From Siblings to Lovers"	December 13, 2012	20.4%	#1	#4	
Away from the eyes of their mother, Nigel could no longer contain his true feelings for his stepsister, Chantal. Will this intimate moment lead them to a romantic relationship?
35	"Angeline is Pregnant!"	December 14, 2012	—N/a			
Pleased by the good news from her doctor, Angeline was rushing with excitement to inform her husband, Marcel, that she is now conceiving their first child together.
36	"Angeline Drowns in Misery"	December 17, 2012	—N/a			
During her intense encounter with Heidi, Angeline fell into the sea and was left helpless by her husband’s mistress.
37	"Angeline's Life is at Risk"	December 18, 2012	—N/a			
As she tries to get rid of Angeline's only relation to Marcel, who is their miracle baby, Heidi's desperation turns into a potential crime.
38	"Nigel Saves His Last Hope"	December 19, 2012	—N/a			
Nigel might have lost his stepsister Chantal and the trust of his stepmom Yolanda, but he still managed to have high hopes because of the light Angeline brings into his life.
39	"Who is Angeline's Killer?"	December 20, 2012	—N/a			
Romeo and Angeline's family was not convinced with the facts given by the police department and finds it unbelievable that the latter would commit suicide. Instead, he assumes that there could be a killer on the loose.
40	"Awakening Angeline's Lost Memories"	December 21, 2012	21.4%	#1	#2	
After escaping the hospital, some familiar locations were revisited by Angeline. One of them was Marcel and Heidi's engagement party, which brought back her memory and sad past.
41	"Angeline's New Beginning"	December 24, 2012	20.5%	#1	#1	
Moved by her poor condition, Scarlet sympathizes with the indecent state of Angeline and agrees to help her find a job and a home to live in.
42	"Chantal Meets Lady Armada"	December 25, 2012	19.5%	#1	#2	
To make a debut in the beauty industry, Chantal tried to join Lady Armada's make-up competition.
43	"Chantal Reunites With Nigel"	December 26, 2012	23.9%	#1	#1	
Chantal unexpectedly reunited with her savior when Lady Armada introduced the former to her son, Nigel.
44	"Nigel Finds Out Chantal's Identity"	December 27, 2012	25.9%	#1	#1	
Romeo invited all of his employees to attend a prayer tribute for Angeline’s death. Much to Nigel’s surprise, the picture revealed Chantal’s identity. Will he divulge the latter’s secret?
45	"Chantal's Secret is Out"	December 28, 2012	25.9%	#1	#1	
Will Lady Armada still accept Chantal in her home now that she knows the truth about the latter’s true identity?
46	"Heidi's Pregnancy Issue"	December 31, 2012	19.3%	#1	#1	
Heidi felt she was on top of her game because she was pregnant with Marcel's baby and Angeline was pronounced dead. But because of an incident, she's not going to make her dream of becoming a mother and a Mrs. Salcedo.

=== January 2013 ===
No.	Title	Original air date	AGB Nielsen Ratings (Mega Manila)	Timeslot Rank	Primetime Rank	Ref.
47	"Nigel's Burning Desire for Chantal"	January 1, 2013	23.2%	#1	#2	
As soon as they were left alone together, Nigel took the opportunity to express his admiration for Chantal discreetly. Will she notice the hidden desire of the former?
48	"Is That Angeline?"	January 2, 2013	27.4%	#1	#1	
Trapped in paranoia that her former friend might still be alive, Heidi saw a woman who mysteriously looks like Angeline. Could this be really her?
49	"Chantal Shocks Everyone With Her Revelation"	January 3, 2013	29.3%	#1	#1	
The long wait is over because the pride of the House of Armada, Chantal, has introduced herself and was immediately admired by the audience because of her talent, beauty, and charisma.
50	"Chantal's Poisonous Touch"	January 4, 2013	27.1%	#1	#1	
As Chantal gets her hands on Marcel, he seems to forget that he’s already engaged with Heidi and gets trapped with the former’s alluring beauty.
51	"Chantal's Intimate Invitation"	January 7, 2013	25.4%	#1	#2	
To grant the request of his client, Marcel immediately met up with Chantal but much to his surprise, he saw her wearing a seductive bikini to tease him. Will he give in to the latter's temptation?
52	"The Armadas' Surprise for Chantal"	January 8, 2013	26.3%	#1	#1	
After seeing Chantal longing for her family’s comfort, Lady Armada and Nigel commenced a plan to reunite her with her loved ones.
53	"Double Date With My Flirty Client"	January 9, 2013	28.5%	#1	#1	
Even if they try to avoid Chantal, fate seems to be out of their hands as Marcel and Heidi’s dinner date became catastrophic when the former joined them unexpectedly.
54	"Marcel and Chantal's Quickie Bathroom Break"	January 10, 2013	26.1%	#1	#1	
Without Heidi’s knowledge, Marcel enjoyed a brisk intimate moment with Chantal in the comfort room. Will the former catch their sneaky action?
55	"Chantal's Irresistible Temptation"	January 11, 2013	29.1%	#1	#1	
Chantal starts to play with fire as she tries to seduce Marcel with her charm. Will the latter start fall for the former’s foolish trap?
56	"When the Mistress Meets Her Lover's Another Woman"	January 14, 2013	27.1%	#1	#3	
While she was looking for Marcel's mistress, Heidi had become a laughing stock because she was trying to prove that her fiancé had another woman who looked exactly like Angeline.
57	"Chantal Gonzales Meets the Salcedos"	January 15, 2013	25.7%	#1	#3	
Chantal will take her revenge on the next level by showing herself to the Salcedo family and investing in their business.
58	"Marcel and Chantal's Catastrophic Joyride"	January 16, 2013	—N/a			
Marcel and Angeline's brief road trip ends up in a shocking revelation as Heidi catches them in the act of cheating.
59	"Marcel's Intense Obsession With Chantal"	January 17, 2013	26.1%	#1	#2	
Trapped with her charm, Marcel seems to experience an uncontrollable infatuation for Chantal. Will the latter satisfy his sinful cravings?
60	"Who is the Philippines' Next Top Make-Up Artist?"	January 18, 2013	26.8%	#1	#1	
The only chance left for Heidi to save her company is by winning the Philippines' Next Top Make-up Artist competition. Surprisingly, Chantal also joined the contest. Will their rivalry lead the former to victory?
61	"Chantal Beats Heidi's Career to Dust"	January 21, 2013	26.1%	#1	#1	
As she flaunts the natural beauty on stage, Chantal became victorious in the Philippines' Next Top Make-up Artist competition, leaving Heidi bitter with her success.
62	"All Hail the New Queen of Bella France!"	January 22, 2013	26.5%	#1	#1	
Now that House of Armada has legally owned Bella France, it’s time for Chantal to take over Heidi’s venerable company.
63	"The Mistress Ruins the Night"	January 23, 2013	26.5%	#1	#1	
Same as how Heidi ruined their anniversary, Chantal tried to manipulate Marcel to spend the night with her instead of celebrating with his fiancée.
64	"Chantal Sells Her Soul to Marcel"	January 24, 2013	24.8%	#1	#3	
Even if it’s painful for her conscience to bear, Chantal was left with no other choice but to satisfy the intimate needs of Marcel.
65	"Nigel's Confession in the Rain"	January 25, 2013	25.7%	#1	#2	
To stop her from running away with Marcel, Nigel bravely confesses his love for Chantal. Will she ever acknowledge his feelings?
66	"Heidi's Secret is Out!"	January 28, 2013	25.9%	#1	#2	
After fighting Chantal, Heidi unintentionally revealed her secret in front of Marcel.
67	"Heidi's Greatest Downfall"	January 29, 2013	25.5%	#1	#2	
No matter what Heidi says, no one believes her now because she fakes her pregnancy. What is she going to do to win Marcel's trust and his family again?
68	"Marcel Runs Away With His Mistress"	January 30, 2013	24.0%	#1	#2	
As his mistress loses her consciousness, immediately took advantage of Chantal’s weak condition to bring her to their condominium. What could be his motive?
69	"Marcel Apologizes to Angeline's Family"	January 31, 2013	25.7%	#1	#2	
As he aspires to become a changed man for Chantal, Marcel apologized to Angeline’s family as he became a cruel husband to his late wife.

=== February 2013 ===
No.	Title	Original air date	AGB Nielsen Ratings (Mega Manila)	Timeslot Rank	Primetime Rank	Ref.
70	"Chantal is Blinded by Revenge"	February 1, 2013	24.7%	#1	#4	
To stop Chantal’s revenge, Nigel reminded her of her painful past in the hands of Marcel. Will this be enough to resurrect the heart of the real Angeline?
71	"Chantal Spends the Night With Her Ex-Husband"	February 4, 2013	24.7%	#1	#2	
Instead of Nigel, Marcel was the one who arrived to meet up with Chantal. Will the latter believe his excuse of his sudden appearance?
72	"Marcel is the Mastermind!"	February 5, 2013	24.5%	#1	#2	
To ruin her ex-fiancé’s new relationship, Heidi immediately reported to Chantal that the mastermind on Nigel’s hit and run case was Marcel.
73	"Heidi Discovers Chantal's Secret"	February 6, 2013	25.3%	#1	#2	
After discreetly searching, Heidi found proof that Angeline might still be alive and is hiding under Chantal’s identity.
74	"Angeline is Back from the Dead!"	February 7, 2013	26.3%	#1	#1	
During the Salcedos’ biggest event, Chantal fiercely barged in to reveal her identity to the rich family.
75	"The Armadas Overthrow the Salcedo Family"	February 8, 2013	26.7%	#1	#1	
The long wait is over for Chantal and Yolanda as they divulge their ownership to all the Salcedos’ fortune.
76	"Angeline's Bittersweet But Victorious Revenge"	February 11, 2013	24.4%	#1	#2	
Even if she was successful to overthrow the Salcedos, Angeline seems to be in pain as her conscience couldn’t accept the fact that she ruined a beautiful life of a wealthy family that she once was part of.
77	"Heidi's Trap for Angeline"	February 12, 2013	27.4%	#1	#2	
Angeline thought she's done fighting for the life she deserves, but Heidi wants to take vengeance on her because she's the reason why Marcel dumped her.
78	"Angeline Throws Heidi Behind Bars"	February 13, 2013	25.9%	#1	#1	
With the help of Marcel, Heidi was caught by the police to pay for her numerous attempted murders to Angeline.
79	"Breakfast With the Legal Husband"	February 14, 2013	25.0%	#1	#2	
To surprise his legal wife, Marcel came to Angeline’s house to serve her favorite breakfast. Will she accept his kind gesture?
80	"Angeline's Threesome Relationship"	February 15, 2013	24.9%	#1	#3	
As her two suitors continue to compete for her love and affection, Angeline was left confused on who is she going to choose between Nigel and Marcel.
81	"Marcel Kidnaps Angeline"	February 18, 2013	22.1%	#1	#5	
Desperate to make her cold wife fall in love again, Marcel deceitfully abducted Angeline. Will his foolish plan turn out successful?
82	"Marcel's Last Shot to Save His Marriage"	February 19, 2013	22.6%	#1	#4	
Marcel will make the most out of his day with Angeline so he could convince her to call off their annulment.
83	"Angeline Gets a Peek of Marcel's Special Treat"	February 20, 2013	23.6%	#1	#3	
On their last day together, Angeline was surprised to get a glimpse of Marcel’s surprise.
84	"Nigel Ghosts on Angeline"	February 21, 2013	25.1%	#1	#3	
Thinking that his girlfriend would choose Marcel, Nigel decided to take some time away from Angeline. Did he make the right decision?
85	"Angeline and Marcel's Marriage Falls Apart"	February 22, 2013	26.1%	#1	#4	
In order to finally move forward to her life with Nigel Angeline finally sets Marcel free from her resentment. Will the latter accept the end of their marriage?
86	"The Real Chantal is Back!"	February 25, 2013	22.2%	#1	#6	
Nigel and Angeline's engagement night ends up in a nightmare as the real Chantal shockingly returns to the House of Armada.
87	"Chantal's Dangerous Obsession for Nigel"	February 26, 2013	24.2%	#1	#4	
Chantal’s unstable condition poses a threat to Angeline, as the former is filled with love and obsession for Nigel.
88	"Angeline Slaps the Truth to Nigel"	February 27, 2013	22.8%	#1	#4	
As they continue to hide their affair from Chantal, Angeline and Nigel’s relationship gets into jeaopardy because of jealousy and selfishness. Will this signal the end of their relationship?
89	"Angeline Gets Trapped in a Love Triangle"	February 28, 2013	24.2%	#1	#5	
Angeline continues to bear the pain that her fiancé, Nigel, is now being romantically linked to Chantal. How long can the former endure her martyr situation?

=== March 2013 ===
No.	Title	Original air date	AGB Nielsen Ratings (Mega Manila)	Timeslot Rank	Primetime Rank	Ref.
90	"Chantal and Angeline's Swimsuit Showdown"	March 1, 2013	25.4%	#1	#2	
To impress Nigel, Chantal and Angeline confidently flaunt their swimwear attire on their beach trip. Which girl stood out for the former?
91	"Nigel Craves for Angeline's Kiss"	March 4, 2013	22.0%	#1	#4	
Yearning for the touch and affection from his fiancée, Nigel rushed to have a brief intimate moment with Angeline.
92	"Nigel's Engagement Gets Busted!"	March 5, 2013	22.6%	#1	#4	
Chantal’s life started to fall apart again after finding out the truth about Nigel’s engagement with Angeline.
93	"Chantal Makes an Explosive Revenge"	March 6, 2013	21.1%	#1	#5	
Driven by hatred and anger, Chantal prepared a false celebration to announce Angeline as Nigel’s mistress.
94	"Angeline Breaks Up With Nigel"	March 7, 2013	23.7%	#1	#5	
Filled with gratitude for her mentor, Angeline was left with no other choice but to return Lady Armada’s favor by breaking up with Nigel.
95	"Angeline Calls Off Her Engagement"	March 8, 2013	21.9%	#1	#6	
Nigel’s most-awaited engagement immediately falls apart as Angeline leaves him for Marcel.
96	"Angeline Accepts Nigel's Love"	March 11, 2013	24.1%	#1	#5	
After a long time, Angeline agreed to be with Nigel but Chantal didn't take it lightly. What is the latter going to do after learning that the guy she loves is going to get married?
97	"Nigel's Promise to Chantal"	March 12, 2013	23.0%	#1	#4	
Nigel loves Angeline, but because of envy, he can't let Chantal damage herself. What will he do to keep both of them safe?
98	"Heidi's Revenge Begins Today!"	March 13, 2013	21.3%	#1	#5	
Free from the bars of the jail, Heidi fearlessly confronts Angeline to threaten her life once again. Will her plan turn out successfully?
99	"Goodbye, Angeline"	March 14, 2013	25.3%	#1	#4	
In her hopes of finding a new beginning away from the Armada family, Angeline begs Nigel to set her free.
100	"Chantal's Dream Wedding With Nigel Comes True"	March 15, 2013	24.3%	#1	#4	
Her most-awaited moment has finally become a reality as Chantal walks down the aisle for her wedding with Nigel.
101	"Nigel Possesses Angeline Once Again"	March 18, 2013	22.7%	#1	#4	
As Chantal sets him free, Nigel rushes to see Angeline only to find out that she is about to go abroad. Will Nigel make it before it gets too late?
102	"Bow Down to Queen Angeline!"	March 19, 2013	23.5%	#1	#5	
In support of Marcel’s marriage proposal, Romeo shamefully kneels before Angeline to beg for her agreement.
103	"Heidi Overthrows Angeline"	March 20, 2013	21.9%	#1	#4	
After marrying a Filipino business tycoon, Heidi glamorously defeats Angeline by winning a bid with her enormous wealth.
104	"Nigel vs. Marcel"	March 21, 2013	21.4%	#1	#7	
Filled with jealousy, Marcel furiously challenges Nigel in a brawl in front of Angeline. How will the latter stop the two from fighting?
105	"Let the Sexy Dance Showdown, Begin!"	March 22, 2013	24.6%	#1	#4	
Upon attending Heidi’s grand welcoming party, Angeline took the spotlight by slaying the dance floor with Nigel.
106	"Heidi and Angeline's One-on-One Rumble"	March 25, 2013	24.1%	#2	#4	
Obsessed to take revenge on her rival, Heidi plotted a plan to ruin Angeline’s image in public.
107	"Angeline Framed in a Rape Slay Case!"	March 26, 2013	21.7%	#2	#7	
Desperate to escape the hands of her rapist, Angeline was left with no other choice but to hit Marcel. Will she be considered by the authority as a murderer?
108	"Angeline, the Killer Ex-Wife"	March 27, 2013	22.8%	#1	#2	
As the authorities continue to investigate the case of Marcel, Angeline was left detained in prison due to the evidence of her bloody dispute with the former.

=== April 2013 ===
No.	Title	Original air date	AGB Nielsen Ratings (Mega Manila)	Timeslot Rank	Primetime Rank	Ref.
109	"Marcel is Trapped in Danger!"	April 1, 2013	24.3%	#1	#4	
After a long search for her ex-husband’s whereabouts, Angeline managed to find Marcel at the scene of the crime. Can the former save him from danger?
110	"Heidi Abducts Angeline"	April 2, 2013	23.4%	#1	#3	
Without any hesitation, Heidi impulsively abducts Angeline to put an end to her life.
111	"Angeline Suffers Under Heidi's Hands"	April 3, 2013	24.6%	#1	#2	
Expecting that Marcel will come to surrender himself in exchange for his ex-wife, Heidi sent him a video where she mercilessly tortures Angeline.
112	"Marcel Bids Goodbye to Angeline"	April 4, 2013	27.5%	#1	#1	
For the last time, Marcel reveals how much he really loves Angeline considering the affair he had with Heidi before.
113	"Angeline's Most Awaited Day"	April 5, 2013	27.9%	#1	#1	
After years of struggling for Marcel's affection, she finally found the man she's going to love for the rest of her life, and that's Nigel.
