= Chae Young-in =

South Korean singer and actress (born 1981)

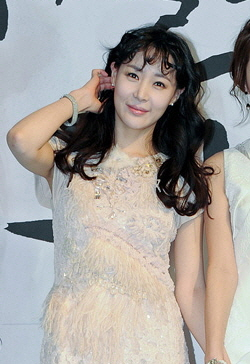
- Chae in January 2012
- Born: Bae Young-seon; August 28, 1981 (age 45); South Korea
- Education: Woosuk University – Bachelor of Gugak; Kyonggi University – Broadcasting and Entertainment
- Occupations: Singer; actress
- Years active: 2000–present
- Spouse: Unknown (m. 2012)
- Children: 1 daughter

Korean name
- Hangul: 배영선
- RR: Bae Yeongseon
- MR: Pae Yŏngsŏn

Stage name
- Hangul: 채영인
- RR: Chae Yeongin
- MR: Ch'ae Yŏngin

Chae Young-in (Korean: 채영인; born Bae Young-seon; August 28, 1981) is a South Korean singer and actress.

== Career ==
She debuted in the entertainment industry since 2000 through the Super Elite model contest. She was the leader of the former South Korean girl group Red Sox which was active from 2005 to 2006. In August 2006, she debuted as a solo singer but the audience reaction was not good. Since 2007, she has focused to the acting career and is currently active. In 2008, she won "New Star Award" on 2008 SBS Drama Awards thanks to her role "Min So-hee" in drama Temptation of Wife.

== Personal life ==
Chae Young-in married her boyfriend who is a dermatologist on November 24, 2012. Their daughter Kim So-yool was born in April 2015. Chae Young-in and her daughter have shortly appeared on episode 296 of SBS's variety show Running Man.

== Filmography ==
=== Television series ===
Year	Title	Role/Note(s)
2002–2003	The Maengs' Golden Era	Hyun-soo (kindergarten teacher)
2003	Damo	Jo Nan-hee
2004	Nonstop 5	
2007	Love Racing	Do Se-ra
2008	I Am Happy	Ji-sook
2008–2009	Temptation of Wife	Min So-hee
2008–2009	Terroir	Manager Jo Min-ji
2010	Stars Falling from the Sky	Jung Jae-young
2011–2012	Living in Style	Choi So-hyung
2012	Glowing She	Seo Yeon-hee

=== Film ===
Year	Title	Role
2012	Perfect Number	Diving Master

=== Variety show ===
Year	Title	Notes/Ref.
2005	X-Man	Guest (episodes 112–113)
2009	Strong Heart	Guest (episode 9)
2016	Running Man	Special guest (episode 296)

== Awards and nominations ==
Year	Award	Category	Nominated work	Result
2008	SBS Drama Awards	New Star Award	Temptation of Wife	Won
