= Mom Has an Affair =

2020 South Korean television series

- Hangul: 엄마가 바람났다
- Lit.: Mom Is Cheating
- RR: Eommaga baramnatda
- MR: Ŏmmaga paramnatta
- Genre: Romance; Drama; Family
- Created by: Studio S (SBS)
- Written by: Ahn Seo-jung
- Directed by: Ko Heung-sik
- Starring: Hyun Jyu-ni; Lee Jae-hwang; Moon Bo-ryung; Kim Hyeong-beom
- Country of origin: South Korea
- Original language: Korean
- No. of episodes: 122

Production
- Executive producer: Park Young-soo
- Producers: Kim Yong-jin; Sohn Jae-sung
- Running time: 35 minutes
- Production companies: Mega Monster; Studio S

Original release
- Network: SBS TV
- Release: May 4 – October 23, 2020

Mom Has an Affair (Korean: 엄마가 바람났다) is a 2020 South Korean television series starring Hyun Jyu-ni, Lee Jae-hwang, Moon Bo-ryung, and Kim Hyeong-beom. It aired on SBS every Monday to Friday at 20:40 (KST) starting 4 May 2020.

== Synopsis ==
Desperate times call for desperate measures and for one mom, that means bagging a rich man to make her kids happy. Pil Jeong is a single, divorced mom of two who swore that she'll never get married again. Her children, on the other hand, have other plans in store. They beg her to find and marry a rich man as a means of securing their family's future and a hilarious family expansion project ensues.

== Cast ==
=== Main ===
- Hyun Jyu-ni as Oh Pil-jung
- Lee Jae-hwang as Kang Seok-joon
- Moon Bo-ryung as Lee Eun-joo
- Kim Hyeong-beom as Kang Seok-hwan

=== Oh Family ===
- Nam I-an as Oh Soon-jung
- Park Sun-cheon as Kim Bok-soon
- Gil Jung-woo as Park Min-ho
  - Kim Dong-ha as young Park Min-Ho (7 years old)
- Hong Je-yi as Park Min-ji

=== Kang Family ===
- Yang Geum-seok as Kim Hae-jung
- Lee Won-jae as Kang Tae-soo

=== Lee Family ===
- Seo Hyun-suk as Lee Tae-woo
- Kim Dong-gyun as Choi Dong-seok
- Lee Jin-a as Choi Eun-ja
- Lee Young-eun as Choi Yoo-kyung

=== Others ===
- Jeon Eun-chae as Choi Mi-young
- Cha Seung-woo as Wang Ki-beom
- Kim Young-hoon as Ha Yeol-do
- No Jung-myung as Hong Soo-kyung
- Kang Seo-joon as Park Tae-sub
- Park Ji-soo as Park Hye-jin
- Seo Hee as doctor
- Gu Seo-jun as detective
- Bae Min-hun as Han Ga-ram
- Park Yoo-mil as doctor
- Kim Yun-seul as park girl
- Oh Min-jung as pattern maker
- Kim Ha-kyun
- Yu Seung-il
- Kim Woo-bin
- Jung Sang-hyun
- Kwon Jung-eun
- Jo Yeon-woo
- Yoon Hwan
- Park So-eul
- Ko Tae-hui
- Hong Seong-min
- Kim Hwa-young
- Hwang Ga-hee
