= Only Because It's You =

- Promotional poster
- Also known as: I Like You; You're My Favorite
- Genre: Romance; Melodrama; Family
- Written by: Lee Hye-sun
- Directed by: Shin Kyung-soo
- Starring: Yoon Hae-young; Yoon Ji-min; Lee Jae-hwang; Park Hyuk-kwon
- Country of origin: South Korea
- Original language: Korean
- No. of episodes: 117

Production
- Production location: Korea
- Running time: Mondays to Fridays at 08:30 (KST)

Original release
- Network: Seoul Broadcasting System
- Release: 3 September 2012 – 15 February 2013

Only Because It's You (Korean: 너라서 좋아; RR: Neoraseo joa) is a 2012 South Korean television series starring Yoon Hae-young, Yoon Ji-min, Lee Jae-hwang and Park Hyuk-kwon. It aired on SBS from September 3, 2012, to February 15, 2013, on Mondays to Fridays at 8:30 a.m. for 117 episodes.

== Plot ==
The series follows three women who reunite for the first time after leaving high school eighteen years earlier. Now in their 30s, the women find themselves facing difficult challenges in their personal and romantic lives.

== Cast ==
- Yoon Hae-young as Kang Jin-joo
  - Heo Jung-eun as young Kang Jin-joo
- Yoon Ji-min as Yang Soo-bin
- Lee Jae-hwang as Seo Ji-hwan
- Park Hyuk-kwon as Chun Myung-hwan
- Ra Mi-ran as Yoon Gong-ja
- Kwon Hyung-joon as Gi Se-nam
- Song Ok-sook as Ma Joo-hee
- Yu Ji-in as Go Ae-rang
- Choi Da-in as Chun Eun-byul
- Jeon Jin-seo as Seo Tae-yang
- Ahn Suk-hwan as Jack Black
- Lee Jong-nam as Na Jung-ja
- Jo Hee-bong as Ma Do-yo
- Kang Ki-hwa as Uhm Hye-ra
- Geum Bo-ra as Gong-ja's mother in-law
- Bae Seong-woo as Je-bi
- Kim Seung-gi
- Kang Seo-eun
