= Taste of Love (South Korean TV series) =

South Korean television show

- Promotional poster for season 1
- Hangul: 연애의 맛
- RR: Yeonaeui mat
- MR: Yŏnaeŭi mat
- Genre: Reality show
- Starring: Park Na-rae; Kim Sook; Kim Jae-joong; Jang Su-won; Jung Hyuk
- Country of origin: South Korea
- Original language: Korean
- No. of seasons: 3
- No. of episodes: 47

Production
- Production location: South Korea
- Running time: 90 – 100 minutes

Original release
- Network: TV Chosun
- Release: September 16, 2018 – December 19, 2019

Taste of Love (Korean: 연애의맛) is a South Korea reality show program on TV Chosun. Season 1 was televised on TV Chosun every Thursday at 23:00 (KST) starting from September 16, 2018, and ended on February 22, 2019. Season 2 started broadcast on 23 May 2019.

== Synopsis ==
In the show, a celebrity and non-celebrity date for 100 days, under contract. After the 100 days have passed, the couple decide whether they want to continue dating or not.

== Main MC ==
Name	Season	Ref.
Park Na-rae	1 – present	
Choi Hwa-jung	1 – 2	
Kim Sook	3 – present	

== Fixed Panelist MC ==
Name	Season	Ref.
Lee Yong-jin	2	
Chun Myung-hoon	2	
Hyun Woo	2	
Jang Su-won	2 – present	
Kim Jae-joong	2 – present	
Jung Hyuk	3 – present	

== Cast ==
=== Season 1 ===
Couples	Episodes	Ref.
Kim Jong-min and Hwang Mi-na	1 – 23	
Lee Pil-mo and Seo Soo-yeon	1 – 23	
Kim Jeong-hoon and Kim Jin-ah	1 – 23	
Koo Jun-yup and Oh Ji-hye	1 – 23	
Jeong Young-ju and Kim Sung-won	14 – 23	
Go Joo-won and Kim Bo-mi	16 – 23	

=== Season 2 ===
Couples	Episodes	Ref.
Jang Woo-hyuk (Note: Coupled unknown and had step down from the show.)	1 – 2	
Go Joo-won and Kim Bo-mi	1 – 16	
Oh Chang-seok and Lee Chae-eun	1 – 16	
Lee Hyung-chul and Shin Ju-ri	1 – 16	
Chun Myung-hoon and Jo Hee-kyung	1 – 16	
Sook Haeng and Lee Jong-hyun	5 – 16	
Lee Jae-hwang and Yoo Da-som	12 – 16	

=== Season 3 ===
Casts	Episodes	Ref.
Lee Jae-hwang	1 – 8	
Kang Doo	1 – 8	
Jung Joon	1 – 8	
Yoon Jung-soo	1 – 8	
Park Jin-woo	1 – 8	

== Ratings ==
- In the ratings below, the highest rating for the show will be in red, and the lowest rating for the show will be in blue each year.
- Ratings listed below are the individual corner ratings of Taste of Love. (Note: Individual corner ratings do not include commercial time, which regular ratings include.)

=== Season 1 ===
2018 – 2019		Nielsen Ratings
Ep. #	Original Airdate	Nielsen Ratings
1	September 16, 2018	1.450%
2	September 23, 2018	1.101%
3	September 30, 2018	2.038%
4	October 4, 2018	1.771%
5	October 18, 2018	2.564%
6	October 25, 2018	2.754%
7	November 1, 2018	2.833%
8	November 8, 2018	3.748%
9	November 15, 2018	3.878%
10	November 22, 2018	4.295%
11	November 29, 2018	4.379%
12	December 6, 2018	5.103%
13	December 13, 2018	4.751%
14	December 20, 2018	5.080%
15	December 27, 2018	4.983%
16	January 3, 2019	5.669%
17	January 10, 2019	4.671%
18	January 17, 2019	5.487%
19	January 24, 2019	4.627%
20	January 31, 2019	5.830%
21	February 7, 2019	5.256%
22	February 14, 2019	5.927%
23	February 21, 2019	5.261%

=== Season 2 ===
2019		Nielsen Ratings
Ep. #	Original Airdate	Nielsen Ratings
1	May 23, 2019	3.240%
2	May 30, 2019	3.610%
3	June 6, 2019	4.185%
4	June 13, 2019	4.484%
5	June 20, 2019	4.325%
6	June 27, 2019	4.470%
7	July 4, 2019	4.587%
8	July 11, 2019	4.775%
9	July 25, 2019	5.444%
10	August 1, 2019	4.589%
11	August 8, 2019	4.708%
12	August 15, 2019	4.700%
13	August 22, 2019	4.476%
14	August 29, 2019	3.896%
15	September 5, 2019	4.168%
16	September 19, 2019	4.025%

=== Season 3 ===
2019		Nielsen Ratings
Ep. #	Original Airdate	Nielsen Ratings
1	October 24, 2019	4.485%
2	October 31, 2019	4.213%
3	November 7, 2019	4.263%
4	November 21, 2019	3.677%
5	November 28, 2019	4.781%
6	December 5, 2019	4.524%
7	December 12, 2019	4.599%
8	December 19, 2019	4.672%
