= Yang Geum-seok =

South Korean actress (born 1961)

- Born: January 22, 1961 (age 65); Dogo-myeon, Asan, South Korea
- Education: Shinkwang Girls' High School
- Occupations: Actress; singer
- Years active: 1981–present

Korean name
- Hangul: 양금석
- Hanja: 梁金錫
- RR: Yang Geumseok
- MR: Yang Kŭmsŏk

Yang Geum-seok (Korean: 양금석; born January 22, 1961) is a South Korean actress.

== Filmography ==
=== Film ===
Year	Title	Role
1986	Love Song of a Hero	
1994	In a Handful of Time	
1995	Sunset into the Neon Lights	
2001	My Sassy Girl	Gyeon-woo's aunt
2006	A Millionaire's First Love	(cameo)
2007	My Tutor Friend 2	Lee Dong-wook's mother
2007	Evil Twin	So-yeon's mother
2008	Frivolous Wife	Aunt-in-law

=== Television series ===
Year	Title	Role	Network
1993	Marriage	Myung-hee	SBS
1995	West Palace	Mrs. Kang	KBS2
1995	Woman	Miss Yoon	MBC
1997	A Bluebird Has It	Madam Hwang	KBS2
1998	The Barefooted Youth	Joo Ae-ran	KBS2
1998	Purity		KBS2
1999	Lost One's Way		KBS2
1999	I'm Still Loving You	Min Hyun-ja	MBC
2000	She's the One	Jung Geum-rye	KBS2
2001	Four Sisters	Kim Soon-young	MBC
2001	Like Father, Unlike Son	Kang	KBS2
2001	Piano	Kim In-soon	SBS
2002	Man of the Sun, Lee Je-ma	Ms. Ahn	KBS2
2002	Present	Min Su-ryun	MBC
2003	Hello! Balbari	Balbari's aunt	KBS2
2004	Into the Storm	Song Ji-yeon	SBS
2004	Traveling Women	Jin Pung-ok	SBS
2004	My Lovely Family	Jo Young-sil	KBS1
2004	Toji, the Land	Lady from Ham-an	SBS
2005	Sad Love Story	Lee Gun-woo's deceased mother	MBC
2005	Hello My Teacher	Ji Young-ae	SBS
2005	Loveholic	Park Soo-jin	KBS2
2005	Recipe of Love	Ms. Joo	MBC
2005	Let's Go to the Beach		SBS
2005	Tears of Diamond	Madam Moon	SBS
2006	Dae Jo-yeong	Wu Zetian	KBS1
2006	Cloud Stairs	Yoon Jung-won's mother	KBS2
2006	Lovers	Jung Yang-geum	SBS
2006	Here Comes Ajumma	Shim Woo-chan's aunt	KBS2
2007	Hometown Over the Hill	Choi Myung-hwi	KBS1
2007	Thirty Thousand Miles in Search of My Son	Lee Nan-hee	SBS
2008	You Are My Destiny	Seo Min-jung	KBS1
2010	My Country Calls	Lee Soo-ja	KBS2
2012	12 Signs of Love	Oh Yeon-soon	tvN
2012	Glass Mask	Jung Hye-ran	tvN
2013	A Tale of Two Sisters	Lee Mi-sook	KBS1
2014	Quiz of God 4	Jang Hae-won (guest, episodes 10–12)	OCN
2014	You Are My Destiny	Kang Se-ra's mother	MBC
2015	Eve's Love	Hong Jung-ok	MBC
2018	Nice Witch	Lee Moon-sook	SBS
2020	Mom Has an Affair	Kim Hae-jung	SBS
2021	Red Shoes	Lee Kyung-hee	KBS2

=== Variety show ===
Year	Title	Note(s)
2016	King of Mask Singer	Episode 45 ("Keep Watching")

== Awards and nominations ==
Year	Award	Category	Nominated work	Result
2007	KBS Drama Awards	Excellence Award, Actress in a Serial Drama	Dae Jo-yeong, Hometown Over the Hill	Nominated
