= Yoon Hae-young =

South Korean actress (born 1972)

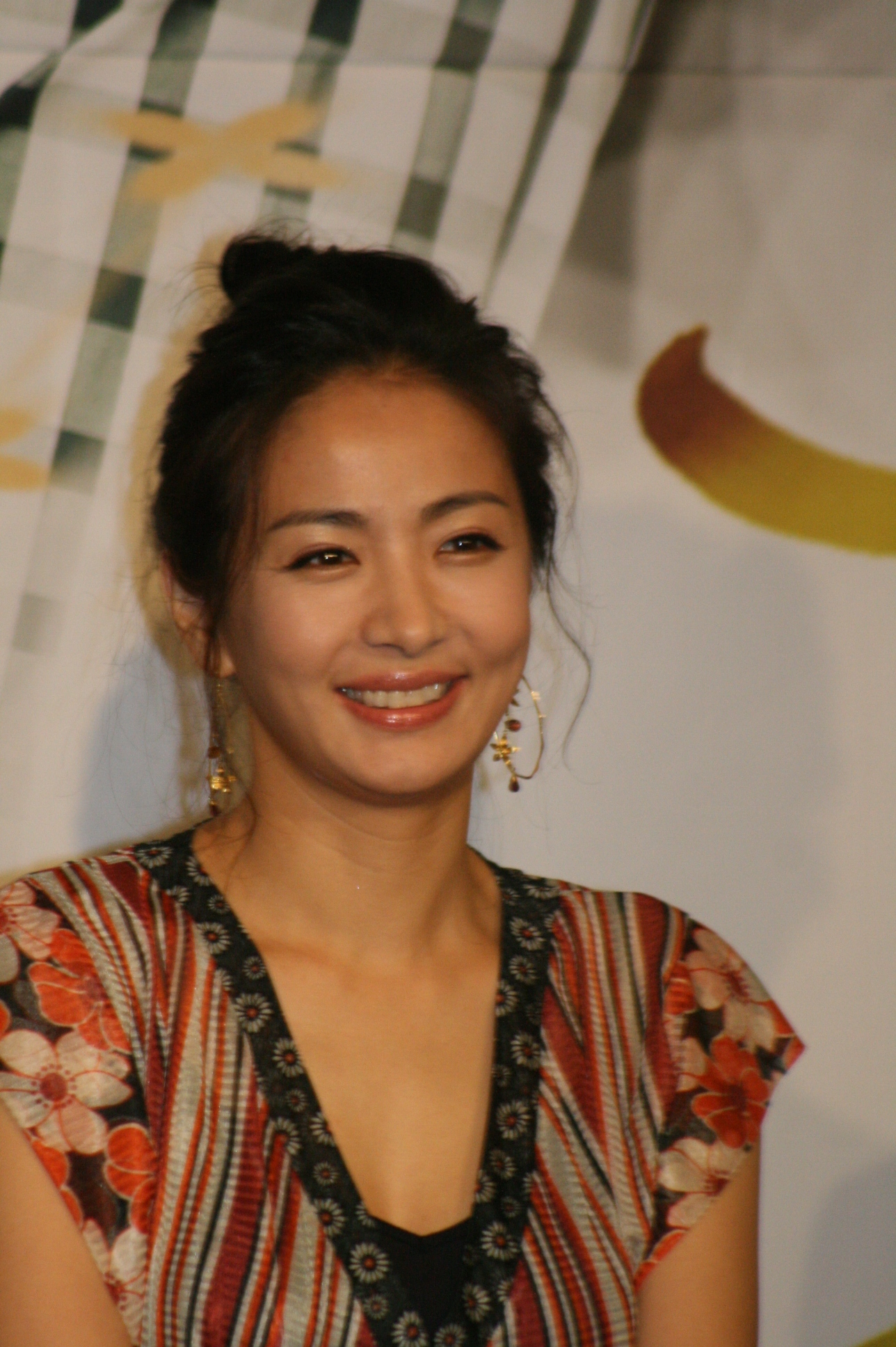
- Yoon in 2008
- Born: January 5, 1972 (age 54); Seoul, South Korea
- Education: Digital Seoul Culture Arts University - Beauty Arts; Kyonggi University - Multimedia and Acting
- Occupation: Actress
- Years active: 1993–present
- Agent: Genstars
- Spouse(s): Unknown (m. 1998; div. 2005) Unknown (m. 2011)

Korean name
- Hangul: 윤해영
- RR: Yun Haeyeong
- MR: Yun Haeyŏng

Yoon Hae-young (Korean: 윤해영; born January 5, 1972) is a South Korean actress. She began acting after passing the SBS Open Auditions in 1993, and has starred in television dramas such as See and See Again (1998), This Is Love (2001), Elephant (2008), The Tale of Janghwa and Hongryeon (also known as Love and Obsession, 2009), Special Task Force MSS (2011) and Only Because It's You (2012).

== Filmography ==
=== Television series ===
Year	Title	Role
1993	Love and Work	
1993	Love and Friendship	Soon-ah
1994	There Is No Love	Nun
1994	That Window	Jung Myung-seo
1995	Until We Meet Again	Im Seung-hye
1995	The Basics of Romance	Drama writer
1996	City Men and Women	Ji Jae-bun/Jung Si-nae
1996	Sou'easter Today	Kang Eun-hee
1998	Horse's Hill	
1998	See and See Again	Geum-joo
1999	Queen	Hong Jang-mi
1999	Oh! Happy Day	
2000	Feels Good	Lee Eun-soo
2000	Great Friends	
2001	Life Is Beautiful	Yoo Soo-jung
2001	This Is Love	Park Hoon-sook
2001	Blue Mist	
2003	One Million Roses	Seo Yoo-jin
2005	Tears of Diamond	Son In-ha
2006	Love Can't Wait	Kim Tae-hee
2006	Love and Ambition	Jae-eun
2007	Heaven & Earth	Park Myung-joo
2008	Kokkiri (Elephant)	Hae-young
2008	My Precious You	Park Jem-ma
2009	Love and Obsession	Hong-ryeon
2010	KBS Drama Special: "Hot Coffee"	Oh Jong
2011	KBS Drama Special: "Special Task Force MSS"	Vivian/Lee Soon-duk
2012	Big	Lee Jung-hye
2012	Only Because It's You	Kang Jin-joo
2013	Prime Minister & I	Na Yoon-hee
2014	Apgujeong Midnight Sun	Do Min-goo
2015	KBS TV Novel: "On a Blue Day"	Jang Deok-hee/Jang Ae-shim
2016	The Doctors	Yoon Ji-young
2018	Ms. Ma, Nemesis	Lee Mi-soon
2019–2020	Love with Flaws	Ms Oh
2021	Be My Dream Family	Oh Min-hee
2023	Durian's Affair	Jang Se-mi
2023	The Third Marriage	Min hae-ill/Noel

=== Film ===
Year	Title	Role
2009	City of Damnation	Jo Min-joo (cameo)

=== Variety/radio show ===
Year	Title	Notes
1997	Hopeful Music at Noon	DJ
2010–2011	Talk & City	Host, seasons 4-5
2013	Restaurants That Relieve Women's Agony	Host
2016	King of Mask Singer	Contestant as "12 O'clock Curfew Pumpkin Carriage", episode 73

== Awards and nominations ==
Year	Award	Category	Nominated work	Result
1998	MBC Drama Awards	Popularity Award	See and See Again	Won
2001	KBS Drama Awards	Excellence Award, Actress	This Is Love	Won
2008	MBC Entertainment Awards	Top Excellence Award, Actress in a Sitcom or Comedy	Kokkiri (Elephant)	Won
2009	KBS Drama Awards	Excellence Award, Actress in a Daily Drama	The Tale of Janghwa and Hongryeon	Nominated
