= Children of Nobody =

South Korean television series

- Promotional poster
- Hangul: 붉은 달 푸른 해
- Lit.: Red Moon Blue Sun
- RR: Bulgeun dal pureun hae
- MR: Pulgŭn tal p'urŭn hae
- Genre: Mystery; Thriller
- Created by: Sohn Hyung-suk
- Written by: Do Hyun-jung
- Directed by: Choi Jung-kyu; Kang Hee-joo
- Starring: Kim Sun-a; Lee Yi-kyung; Nam Gyu-ri; Cha Hak-yeon
- Music by: Movie Closer
- Country of origin: South Korea
- Original language: Korean
- No. of episodes: 32 (Note: In order to circumvent Korean laws that prevent commercial breaks in the middle of an episode, what would previously have been aired as single 70 minute episodes are now being repackaged as two 35 minute episodes, with two episodes being shown each night with a commercial break between the two.)

Production
- Executive producers: Kim Yong-jin; Lee Jun-ho
- Producer: Kim Ho-young
- Production location: South Korea
- Camera setup: Single-camera
- Running time: 35 minutes
- Production company: Mega Monster (Note: Joint venture of kakao M and Studio Dragon.)

Original release
- Network: MBC TV
- Release: November 21, 2018 – January 16, 2019

Children of Nobody (Korean: 붉은 달 푸른 해; RR: Bulgeun dal pureun hae) is a South Korean television series produced by Mega Monster for MBC, starring Kim Sun-a, Lee Yi-kyung, Nam Gyu-ri and Cha Hak-yeon. It aired on MBC TV every Wednesday and Thursday at 22:00 KST for 32 episodes, from November 21, 2018 to January 16, 2019.

== Synopsis ==
Cha Woo Kyung is a child counselor who works at a children's center. Her life seems perfect since she is married to a great husband and is pregnant. However, her perfect life doesn't last long, when an accident changes her life. She then meets Kang Ji Hun, violent crimes unit detective, who is hurt for hiding his troubling past but is strict toward criminals and believes they should be punished to the full extent.

== Cast ==
=== Main ===
- Kim Sun-a as Cha Woo-kyung

A child psychologist who winds up in a strange car accident. She stumbles upon a mysterious child and embarks on a quest for the truth, using poetry as clues.

- Lee Yi-kyung as Kang Ji-hyun

A police detective who has a good sense of judgement and a natural instinct for crime-solving, he believes in sticking to the basics and that all sins must be judged in the court of law.

- Nam Gyu-ri as Jeon Soo-young

A new recruit in Ji-heon's department. She is deemed a mysterious woman due to her emotions and actions.

- Cha Hak-yeon as Lee Eun-ho

An introverted individual who works at the childcare center where Woo-kyung works. He loves children and becomes much brighter, happier and energetic around them.

=== Supporting ===
==== People related to Cha Woo-kyung ====
- Kim Young-jae as Kim Min-suk

Woo-kyung's husband

- Na Young-hee as Heo Jin-ok

Woo-kyung's mother

- Oh Hye-won as Cha Se-kyung

Woo-kyung's sister

- Joo Ye-rim as Kim Eun-seo

Woo-kyung and Min-suk's daughter

==== Hanul Children's Center people ====
- Kim Pub-rae as Song Ho-min
- Joo Suk-tae as Yoon Tae-joo
- TBA as Song Jae-hak

==== Police officers ====
- Park Soo-young as Chief Hong Gi-tae
- Yeon Jae-hyung as Kwon Chan-wook

==== Others ====
- Ha Eun-soo as Lee Yeon-joo

Ji-heon's ex-girlfriend, who later became Min-suk's mistress.

- Kim Kang-hoon as Han Si-wan

One of the children sheltered at Haneul Center, who has a traumatic past.

- Yoo Eun-mi as Lee Bit Na.
- Kang Mal-geum as Si-wan's mother
- Kim Ji-eun as Min-joo
- Moon Ye-won as Choi Mi-sun

=== Special appearances ===
- Ha Joo-hee as Park Ji-hye

An ex-convict who killed her own child. Due to the incident she received hate upon completing her jail sentence. She was later found dead, burned inside a car.

== Production ==
- Children of Nobody is written by Do Hyun-jung (Que Sera, Sera, The Village: Achiara's Secret) and directed by Choi Jung-kyu (Splendid Politics). A few days before the premiere, MBC announced that Kang Hee-joo (Hide and Seek) will co-direct the series.
- The series is produced for MBC by Mega Monster, a company jointly owned by Kakao M (formerly LOEN Entertainment), KakaoPage, and Studio Dragon.
- Script reading for the series was held in October 2018 at the MBC broadcasting center in Sangam-dong, Seoul.
- The series used some parts of the poem Leper by Seo Jeong-ju.

== Original soundtrack ==
Children of Nobody OST

Soundtrack album by Various artists
- Released: 2018
- Genre: Soundtrack
- Languages: Korean; English
- Labels: Sync Pop; Vlending Co. Ltd.

=== Part 1 ===
Released on November 29, 2018
No.	Title	Lyrics	Music	Artist	Length
1.	"Little Silhouette" (그림자)	Lee Ji Hoon	Copykumo (Park Sung Il), Uncle Sam	Jinsil	04:48
2.	"Little Silhouette" (Inst.)		Copykumo (Park Sung Il), Uncle Sam		04:48
Total length:					09:36

=== Part 2 ===
Released on December 5, 2018
No.	Title	Artist	Length
1.	"Moonlight"	Lee Ba-da	3:31
2.	"Moonlight" (Inst.)		3:31
Total length:			7:02

=== Part 3 ===
Released on December 12, 2018
No.	Title	Artist	Length
1.	"Stars Shine Bright Even That Night" (그 밤에도 별은 찬란히 빛났다)	Richard Parkers	3:32
2.	"Stars Shine Bright Even That Night" (Inst.)		3:32
Total length:			7:04

=== Part 4 ===
Released on December 26, 2018
No.	Title	Artist	Length
1.	"The Family Head" (가장자리)	N (VIXX)	4:22
2.	"The Family Head" (Inst.)		4:22
Total length:			8:44

=== Part 5 ===
Released on January 2, 2019
No.	Title	Artist	Length
1.	"From That Time" (그때부터)	Haebin (Gugudan)	3:49
2.	"From That Time" (Inst.)		3:49
Total length:			7:38

=== Part 6 ===
Released on January 9, 2019
No.	Title	Artist	Length
1.	"Smile Again" (다시 웃을 수 있을까)	Kim Min-seung	3:52
2.	"Smile Again" (Inst.)		3:52
Total length:			7:44

== Ratings ==
Children of Nobody : South Korea viewers per episode (thousands)

Episodes	Episode number															
Episodes	1	2	3	4	5	6	7	8	9	10	11	12	13	14	15	16
Ep.1-16	TBD	971	752	870	TBD	TBD	673	801	TBD	910	897	1033	TBD	TBD	TBD	862
Ep.17-32	TBD	TBD	TBD	TBD	TBD	TBD	TBD	TBD	TBD	907	TBD	TBD	TBD	TBD	TBD	TBD

Source: Audience measurement performed nationwide by Nielsen Media Research.

Average TV viewership ratings
Ep.	Original broadcast date	Title	Average audience share		
Ep.	Original broadcast date	Title	TNmS	AGB Nielsen	
Ep.	Original broadcast date	Title	Nationwide	Nationwide	Seoul
1	November 21, 2018	When the Moon Rose Over the Barley Field (보리밭에 달뜨면)	5.4% (NR)	5.2% (NR)	5.3% (NR)
2	November 21, 2018	When the Moon Rose Over the Barley Field (보리밭에 달뜨면)	6.2% (20th)	5.4% (NR)	5.4% (NR)
3	November 22, 2018	The Little Girl in a Green Dress (녹색 옷을 입은 소녀)	4.8% (NR)	4.7% (NR)	5.6% (19th)
4	November 22, 2018	The Little Girl in a Green Dress (녹색 옷을 입은 소녀)	5.7% (19th)	5.5% (17th)	5.9% (18th)
5	November 28, 2018	Death and Poetry (죽음과 시)	4.1% (NR)	3.8% (NR)	—N/a
6	November 28, 2018	Death and Poetry (죽음과 시)	5.0% (NR)	4.7% (NR)	—N/a
7	November 29, 2018	Secret of the Mummified Lady (미라 여인의 비밀)	3.8% (NR)	3.9% (NR)	4.0% (NR)
8	November 29, 2018	Secret of the Mummified Lady (미라 여인의 비밀)	4.7% (NR)	4.7% (NR)	4.8% (NR)
9	December 5, 2018	Witness (목격자)	4.1% (NR)	4.6% (NR)	4.4% (NR)
10	December 5, 2018	Witness (목격자)	5.2% (NR)	5.5% (20th)	5.4% (NR)
11	December 6, 2018	Reason for Murder (살인의 이유)	—N/a	5.0% (20th)	4.9% (NR)
12	December 6, 2018	Reason for Murder (살인의 이유)	—N/a	6.0% (16th)	6.0% (15th)
13	December 12, 2018	Red Cries (붉은 울음)	—N/a	3.9% (NR)	3.9% (NR)
14	December 12, 2018	Red Cries (붉은 울음)	—N/a	5.2% (NR)	5.4% (NR)
15	December 13, 2018	Same Idea (같은 생각)	3.6% (NR)	4.3% (NR)	4.6% (NR)
16	December 13, 2018	Same Idea (같은 생각)	4.0% (NR)	4.8% (NR)	5.1% (NR)
17	December 20, 2018 (Note: No new episodes were aired on December 19. A special was aired instead.)	Find the Hidden Face (숨은 얼굴 찾기)	3.1% (NR)	3.6% (NR)	4.2% (NR)
18	December 20, 2018	Find the Hidden Face (숨은 얼굴 찾기)	3.5% (NR)	4.7% (NR)	5.4% (19th)
19	December 26, 2018	A Secret That Cannot Be Told (말할 수 없는 비밀)	2.9% (NR)	4.0% (NR)	4.4% (NR)
20	December 26, 2018	A Secret That Cannot Be Told (말할 수 없는 비밀)	3.2% (NR)	4.9% (NR)	5.3% (NR)
21	December 27, 2018	Good Person's Face (착한 사람 얼굴)	3.7% (NR)	4.6% (NR)	5.5% (NR)
22	December 27, 2018	Good Person's Face (착한 사람 얼굴)	3.9% (NR)	4.8% (NR)	5.7% (18th)
23	January 2, 2019	Criminal (범인)	3.6% (NR)	4.5% (NR)	5.1% (NR)
24	January 2, 2019	Criminal (범인)	3.9% (NR)	5.1% (NR)	5.7% (NR)
25	January 3, 2019	Do Not Remember (기억하지 말아야 할 것)	—N/a	4.6% (NR)	5.3% (20th)
26	January 3, 2019	Do Not Remember (기억하지 말아야 할 것)	—N/a	5.4% (20th)	6.2% (17th)
27	January 9, 2019	Unfinished (끝나지 않은)	3.4% (NR)	4.4% (NR)	4.7% (NR)
28	January 9, 2019	Unfinished (끝나지 않은)	3.9% (NR)	4.7% (NR)	5.0% (NR)
29	January 10, 2019	My Little Sister (내 동생)	—N/a	4.1% (NR)	4.3% (NR)
30	January 10, 2019	My Little Sister (내 동생)	—N/a	5.2% (NR)	5.6% (NR)
31	January 16, 2019	Red Moon Blue Sun (Note: In Viu, the episode's title is Children of Nobody.) (붉은 달 푸른 해)	—N/a	4.8% (NR)	5.7% (NR)
32	January 16, 2019	Red Moon Blue Sun (붉은 달 푸른 해)	—N/a	5.3% (NR)	6.2% (17th)
Average			— (Note: Due to some ratings not recorded, the exact average rating is unknown.)	4.8%	—
Special	December 19, 2018	Children of Nobody: Playback from the Start (붉은 달 푸른 해 한번에 몰아보기)	2.9%	3.1%	3.4%
In this table, the blue numbers represent the lowest ratings and the red numbers represent the highest ratings.; This drama airs on a cable channel/pay TV which normally has a relatively smaller audience compared to free-to-air TV/public broadcasters (KBS, SBS, MBC and EBS).; NR denotes that the series did not rank in the top 20 daily programs on that date.; N/A denotes that the rating is not known.

== Awards and nominations ==
Year	Award	Category	Nominated work	Result	Ref.
2018	2018 MBC Drama Awards	Grand Prize (Daesang)	Kim Sun-a	Nominated	
2018	2018 MBC Drama Awards	Drama of the Year	Children of Nobody	Nominated	
2018	2018 MBC Drama Awards	Top Excellence Award, Actor in a Wednesday-Thursday Drama	Kim Sun-a	Won	
2018	2018 MBC Drama Awards	Excellence Award, Actor in a Wednesday-Thursday Miniseries	Lee Yi-kyung	Nominated	
2018	2018 MBC Drama Awards	Excellence Award, Actress in a Wednesday-Thursday Miniseries	Nam Gyu-ri	Nominated	
2018	2018 MBC Drama Awards	Best Supporting Cast in Wednesday-Thursday Miniseries	Kim Yeo-jin	Nominated	
2019	55th Baeksang Arts Awards	Best Drama	Children of Nobody	Nominated	
2019	55th Baeksang Arts Awards	Best Screenplay	Do Hyun-jung	Nominated	

== International broadcast ==
- In Hong Kong, Indonesia, Malaysia, Singapore and Brunei, the series airs on Oh!K TV within 24 hours after the Korean broadcast since November 22, 2018.
- In Canada, the series airs on All TV.
- In Myanmar, the series is broadcast by 5PLUS.
- In Japan, the series was aired on DATV, and later on by LaLa TV.
- The series is available for streaming via:
  - POOQ and iMBC VOD in South Korea,
  - Viki, KOCOWA TV, Viu, and OnDemandKorea worldwide,
  - KKTV in Taiwan.
  - UNTV This 2020 in Philippines
