= Lee Jae-hwang =

South Korean actor (born 1976)

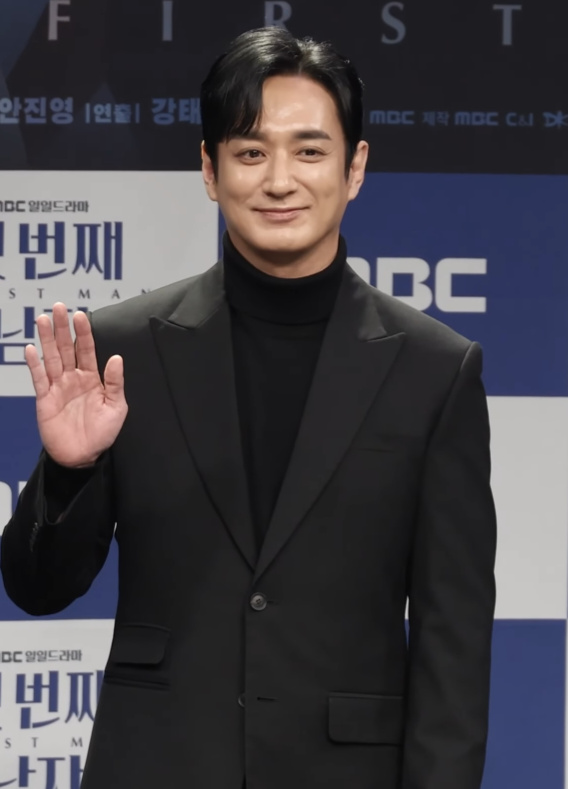
- Lee in December 2025
- Born: December 26, 1976 (age 49); Mapo, Seoul, South Korea
- Education: Kyung Hee University - Nuclear Engineering
- Occupations: Actor; singer
- Years active: 1999–present
- Agent: K Star Entertainment

Korean name
- Hangul: 이재황
- Hanja: 李在晃
- RR: I Jaehwang
- MR: I Chaehwang

Lee Jae-hwang (born December 26, 1976) is a South Korean actor and singer. He is best known for his role as Min Gun-woo in Temptation of Wife, a 2008 hit television series which garnered a high average viewership of 30% in South Korea.

== Filmography ==
=== Television series ===
Year	Title	Role	Notes/Ref.
1999	Woman Vs. Woman	Doctor	
1999	Kaist	Lee Jae-sung	
1999	How Am I?		
1999	Three Guys and Three Girls		
1999	Jump	Lee Jae-hwang	
2000	Why Can't We Stop Them	Kwon Jae-huang	
2001	How Should I Be?		
2002	We Are Dating Now	Oh Jeon-woo	
2002	Five Brothers and Sisters	Han Woo-sik	
2002	Kitchen Maid	Lee Deok-jae	
2003	Argon	Choi Tae-gon	
2006	A Typhoon in That Summer	Han Ji-ha	
2006	Tears of Diamond		
2006	Please Come Back, Soon-ae	Jang Hyeon-woo (age 32)	
2008	Temptation of Wife	Min Gun-woo	
2009	The Queen Returns	Kang Chan-woo	
2009	Temptation of an Angel	An Jae-sung	Cameo
2012	Only Because It's You	Seo Ji-hwan	
2013	Hold My Hand	Min Joo-won	
2015	Eve's Love	Koo Kang-mo	
2017	Reverse	Kang Dong-bin	
2020	Mom Has an Affair	Kang Seok-joon	
2025–2026	The First Man	Lee Kang-hyuk	

=== Television shows ===
Year	Title	Role	Notes
2019	Taste of Love	Cast member	Season 2, ep. 12–16
2019	Taste of Love	Cast member	Season 3, ep. 1–8

== Discography ==
=== Album ===
Year	Album
2009	Nemuri hime (眠り姫)

== Awards and nominations ==
Year	Award ceremony	Category	Nominated work	Result
2005	SBS Drama Awards	New Star Award	The Typhoon in that Summer & Tears of Diamond	Won
2010	SBS Drama Awards	Excellence Award, Actor in a Weekend or Daily Drama	Smile, Mom	Nominated
