= Hyun Jyu-ni =

South Korean singer and actress (born 1985)

- Born: August 1, 1985 (age 41); Gacheon-ri, Samnam-myeon, Ulju County, Ulsan, South Korea
- Other names: Juni; Ju-an
- Education: Seoul Art College – Applied Music
- Occupations: Singer; actress; musical actress
- Years active: 2008–present
- Spouse: Unknown (m. 2012)
- Children: 2

Korean name
- Hangul: 현쥬니
- RR: Hyeon Juni
- MR: Hyŏn Chuni
- Musical career
- Formerly of: M.M.D

Hyun Jyu-ni (Korean: 현쥬니; born August 1, 1985), previously known under the stage names Juni or Ju-an, is a South Korean singer, actress, and musical actress.

== Career ==
Hyun Jyu-ni debuted as the frontman of the four-member girl rock band BellaMafia, which released the album Overstep in 2008. TV director Lee Jae-kyoo spotted her in the musical Bandits and cast her as a flutist in his television series Beethoven Virus. Hyun had played the flute from a young age, and was previously a member of the Seoul Youth Chamber Orchestra. Since then she has transitioned to an acting career, appearing in supporting roles as a pregnant young girl from Yanbian in Take Off, a hacker in IRIS, a firefighter in Love 911, as well as a starring role as a rock-band vocalist in Sky and Ocean. One of her most high-profile roles was as a young single mother who joins the Comeback Madonna Band in I Am Legend.

In 2020, Hyun became the female lead actress for the first time in her career in the 120-episode SBS morning drama Mom Has an Affair. In 2021, she joined the cast of the tvN show Mama The Idol, which featured former idols who are now mothers; its first episode aired on December 10, 2021. On January 28, 2022, the show's group, Mamadol, released its debut digital single, "Mama The Idol"

.

.

== Personal life ==
Hyun married an entrepreneur on December 13, 2012 in a private ceremony held in Guam. She gave birth to their first child, a son, on July 30, 2013. On April 1, 2025, Hyun announced the birth of a daughter.

== Filmography ==
=== Television series ===
Year	Title	Hangul	Role	Network
2008	Beethoven Virus	베토벤 바이러스	Ha Yi-deun	MBC
2009	IRIS	아이리스	Yang Mi-jung	KBS2
2010	Juni & Ah-min's Single Life	쥬니와 아민의 독립생활백서	Herself	O'live
2010	I Am Legend	나는 전설이다	Yang Ah-reum	SBS
2012	Ohlala Couple	울랄라 부부	Go Il-ran	KBS2
2014	Angel Eyes	엔젤 아이즈	Cha Min-soo	SBS
2014	Mama	마마 – 세상 무서울 게 없는	Rachel	MBC
2016	Descendants of the Sun	태양의 후예	Pyo Ji-soo	KBS2
2017	Bravo My Life	브라보 마이 라이프	Jung Sung-ah	SBS
2019	Legal High	리갈 하이	Sophia	JTBC
2020	Mom Has an Affair	엄마가 바람났다	Oh Pil-jung	SBS
2022	It's Beautiful Now	현재는 아름다워	Lee So-ra	KBS2

=== Variety show ===
Year	Title	Notes
2021	Mama The Idol	Contestant

=== Film ===
Year	Title	Hangul	Role
2009	Take Off	국가대표	Wang Soon-deok
2009	Sky and Ocean	하늘과 바다	Bada
2011	Perfect Game	퍼펙트 게임	Min-kyung
2012	Love 911	반창꼬	Hyun-kyung
2015	You Call It Passion	열정 같은 소리 하고 있네	Reporter Hyun (cameo)

=== Music video appearances ===
Year	Song title	Hangul	Artist
2010	"Half of Half"	반의 반	Lee Seung-hwan

== Musical theatre ==
Year	Title	Hangul	Role	Ref.
2008	Bandits	밴디트 – 또 다른시작		
2023	My Mother	친정엄마	Mi-young	

== Discography ==
Album information	Track listing
Overstep: Album; Artist: BellaMafia; Released: February 4, 2008; Label: Sound Holic/M.Net Media	Track listing: 1. BellaMafia; 2. 꺼져버려; 3. 소리없이; 4. 널 기도해; 5. 소리없이 (Piano Ver)
Happy Ending: Track from Sky and Ocean OST; Released: May 7, 2009; Label: DadaEast/LOEN Entertainment	Track listing: 02. Happy Ending – Juni
Empty: Track from IRIS OST; Released: November 17, 2009; Label: Taewon Entertainment/M.Net Media	Track listing: 05. Empty – Juni
I Am Legend OST: Artist: Comeback Madonna Band; Released: August 31, 2010; Label: A Story/LOEN Entertainment	Track listing: 01. 컴백마돈나 (Comeback Madonna); 02. 백만송이장미 (A Million Roses); 04. Killing Me Softly; 06. 사랑사랑사랑 (Love Love Love); 07. 기분 좋은 날 (A Fine Day); 09. 황홀한 고백 (A Blissful Confession)

== Awards ==
- 2010 Asia Model Awards: Special Model Award – New Star
