= Temptation of Wife (Philippine TV series) =

Philippine television drama series

- Title card
- Genre: Romantic drama
- Based on: Temptation of Wife (2008) by Oh Se-kang
- Written by: Richard "Dode" Cruz; Luningning Ribay; Christine Novicio
- Directed by: Dominic Zapata; Gina Alajar
- Creative director: Jun Lana
- Starring: Marian Rivera; Dennis Trillo; Glaiza de Castro; Rafael Rosell
- Theme music composer: Tata Betita; Vehnee Saturno
- Opening theme: "I Can't Forgive"
- Ending theme: "Anong Daling Sabihin?" by Kyla
- Country of origin: Philippines
- Original language: Tagalog
- No. of episodes: 113 (list of episodes)

Production
- Executive producer: Carolyn B. Galve
- Production locations: Quezon City, Philippines
- Camera setup: Multiple-camera setup
- Running time: 23–36 minutes
- Production company: GMA Entertainment TV

Original release
- Network: GMA Network
- Release: October 29, 2012 – April 5, 2013

Temptation of Wife is a Philippine television drama romance series broadcast by GMA Network. The series is based on a 2008 South Korean drama series of the same title. Directed by Dominic Zapata and Gina Alajar, it stars Marian Rivera in the title role, Dennis Trillo, Glaiza de Castro and Rafael Rosell. It premiered on October 29, 2012, on the network's Telebabad line up. The series concluded on April 5, 2013, with a total of 113 episodes.

The series is streaming online on YouTube.

== Cast and characters ==
Cast

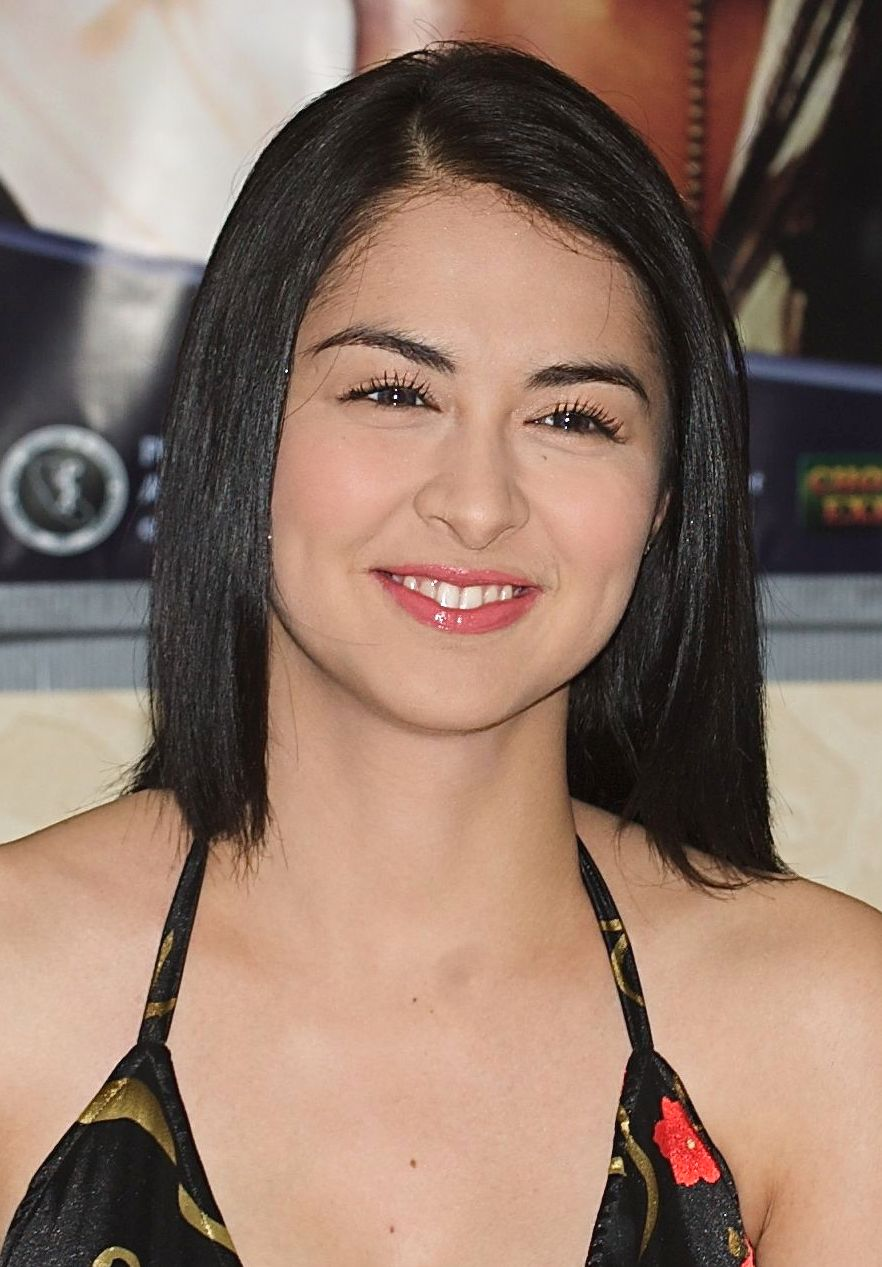
Marian Rivera

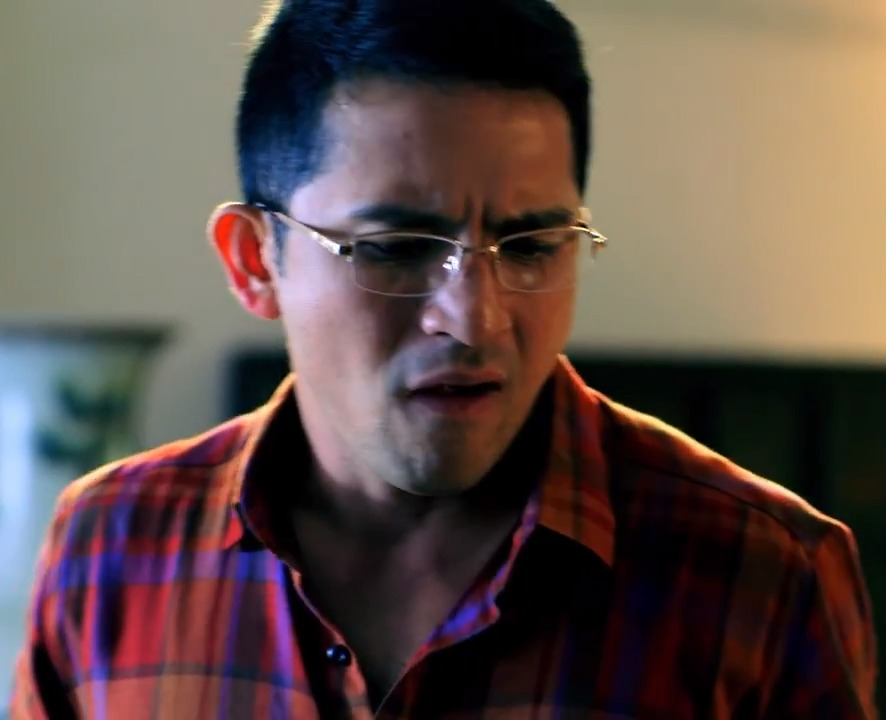
Dennis Trillo

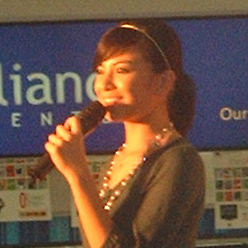
Glaiza de Castro

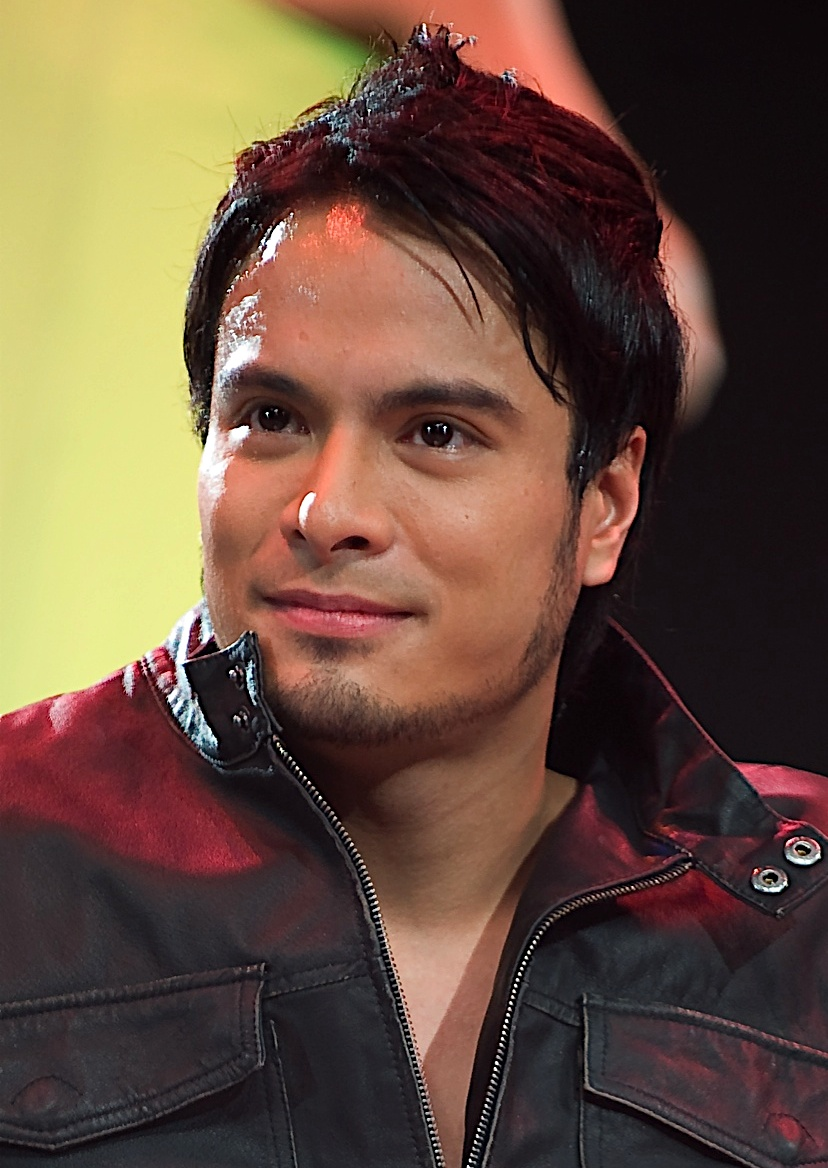
Rafael Rosell

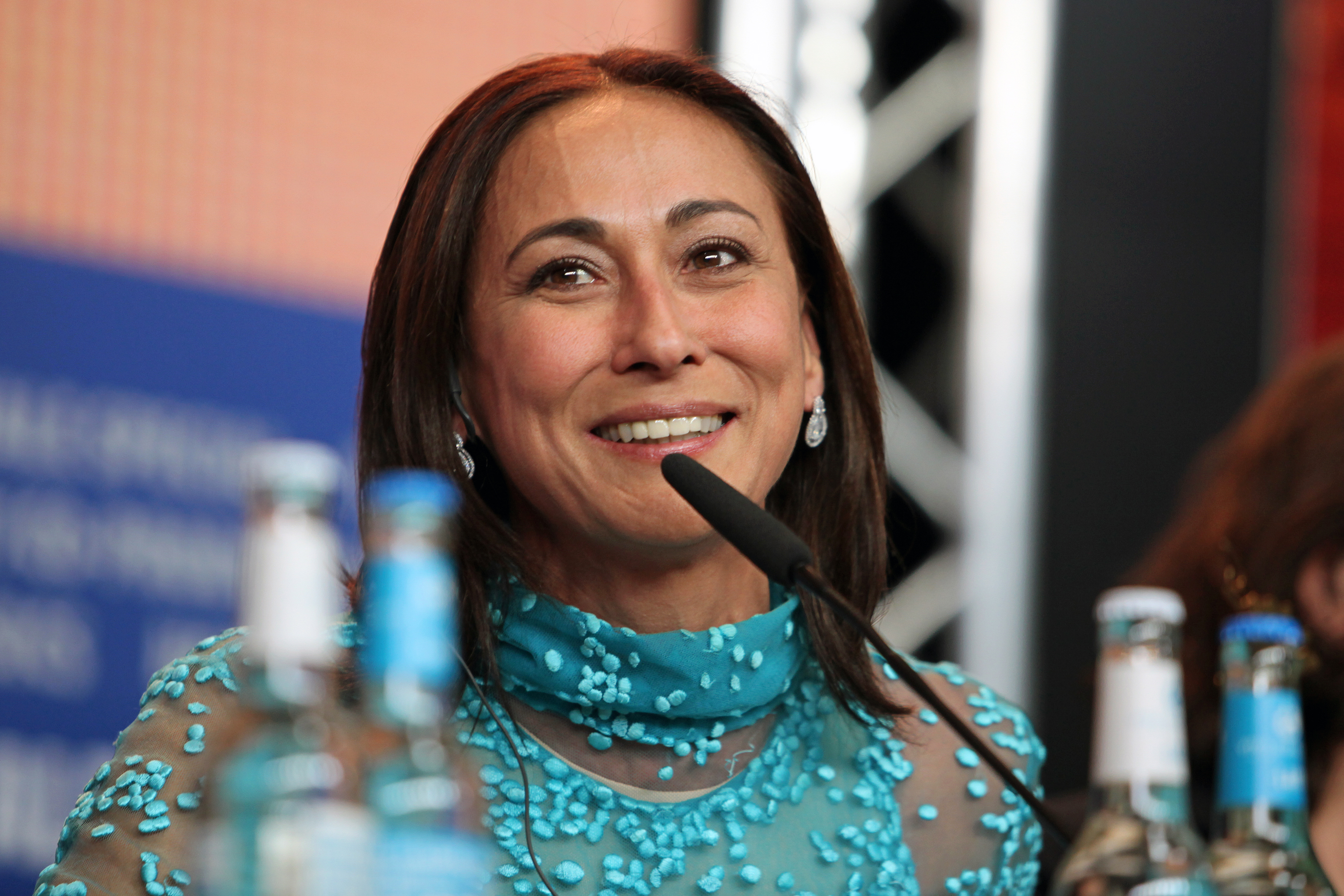
Cherie Gil

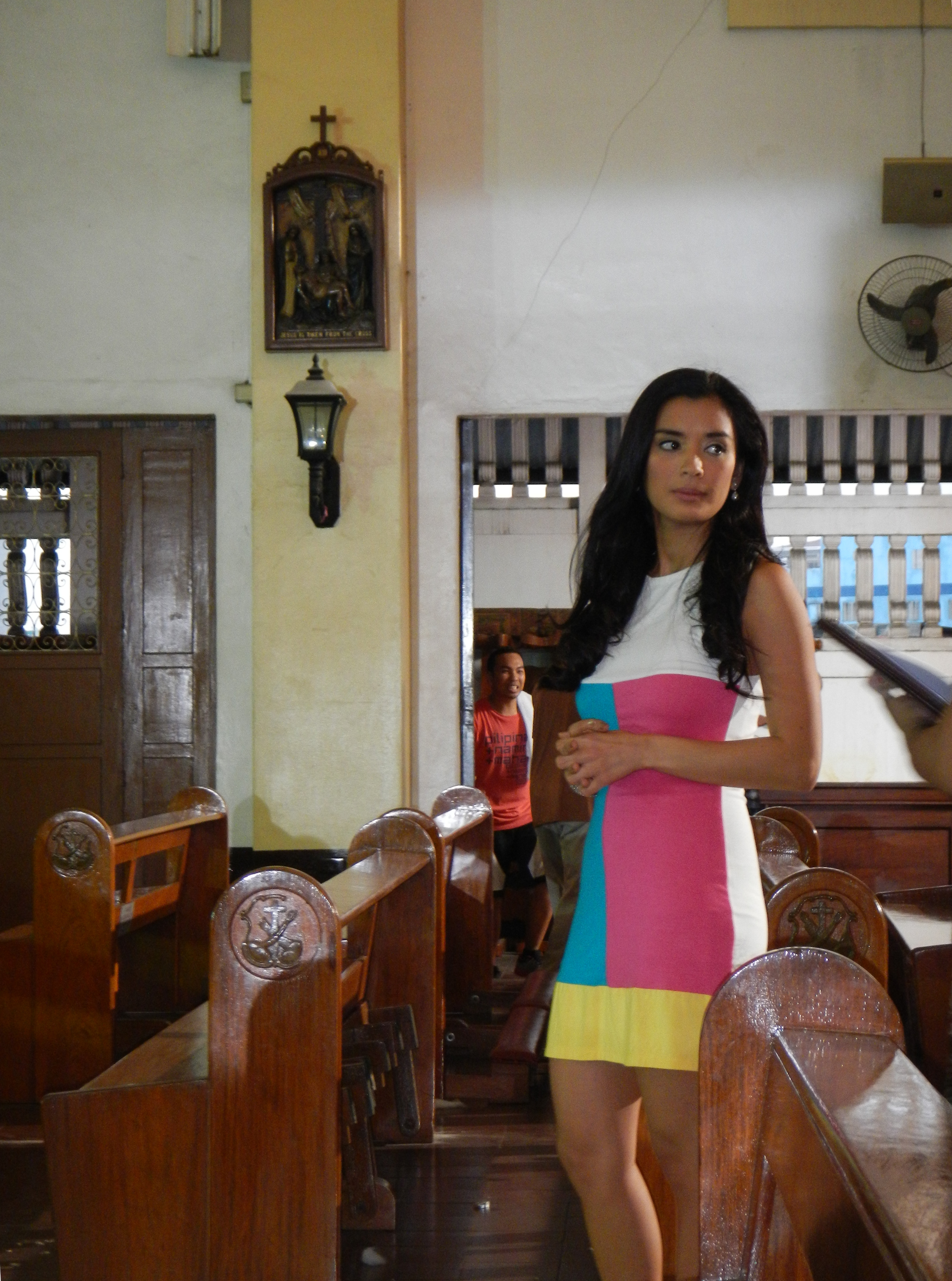
Michelle Madrigal

Lead cast

- Marian Rivera as Angeline Santos-Salcedo / Chantal Gonzales / Angeline Santos-Armada
- Dennis Trillo as Marcelito "Marcel" Salcedo
- Glaiza de Castro as Heidi Fernandez-Montreal
- Rafael Rosell as Nigel Armada

Supporting cast

- Rez Cortez as Abner Santos
- Rio Locsin as Minda Santos
- Antonio Aquitania as Leo Santos
- Raymond Bagatsing as Romeo Salcedo
- Cherie Gil as Stella Salcedo
- Bettina Carlos as Madel Salcedo
- Ayen Munji-Laurel as Yolanda Gonzales-Armada
- Michelle Madrigal as Chantal Gonzales Armada

Recurring cast

- JC Tiuseco as Bernard
- Bubbles Paraiso as Leslie
- Mel Martinez as Pat

Guest cast

- Sheena Halili as younger Yolanda
- Jay Aquitania as younger Romeo
- Mel Kimura as Josefina Fernandez
- Patricia Ysmael as Scarlet
- John Nite as an event host
- Robert Seña as Robert Montreal

== Development ==
Temptation of Wife is a 2008 South Korean television drama series broadcast by Seoul Broadcasting System from November 3, 2008, to May 1, 2009. It was written by Soon-ok Kim and directed by Se-kang Oh. The series starred Seo Hee Jang, Jae Hwang Lee, Woo Min Byun and Seo Hyung Kim in the lead roles.

The series also had a huge success in the Philippines during its run. GMA Network aired the series, dubbed in Tagalog language in an early primetime slot from October 4, 2010 and concluded on May 27, 2011.

In 2011, GMA Network's senior vice president for entertainment, Wilma Galvante stated that they would be adapting the South Korean television series. Pre-production started in earlier 2012. The head writer, Dode Cruz stated that he would develop "a bit serious, sexier and edgier version" than the original. The producer assigned Dominic Zapata to direct the series.

Originally planned for a December 2012 premiere, it was later moved to an earlier date. following the cancellation of the drama series, Haram.

=== Casting ===
The cast was announced on September 11, 2012, during the series' story conference, with the main cast being, Marian Rivera, Dennis Trillo, Alessandra De Rossi and Rafael Rosell. As for Rivera's preparation, she stated that "Whenever I have a new soap, I make sure to ask some tips about the role. Then I talk to my director how he wants me to approach my role. I'd like to have an idea of the character that I am going to portray and how I would give life to it onscreen". She added that she wants every role she does to be different from the previous one in terms of how she going to approach it. Trillo described his character as a "not-so-typical-leading-man" role.

De Rossi was hired to play Heidi Fernandez. The role was eventually given to Glaiza de Castro due to de Rossi's issues with the role.

The series served as Rosell's first major project in GMA Network Inc.. Zapata, required the cast to watch the original series before filming began to familiarize their characters.

== Production ==
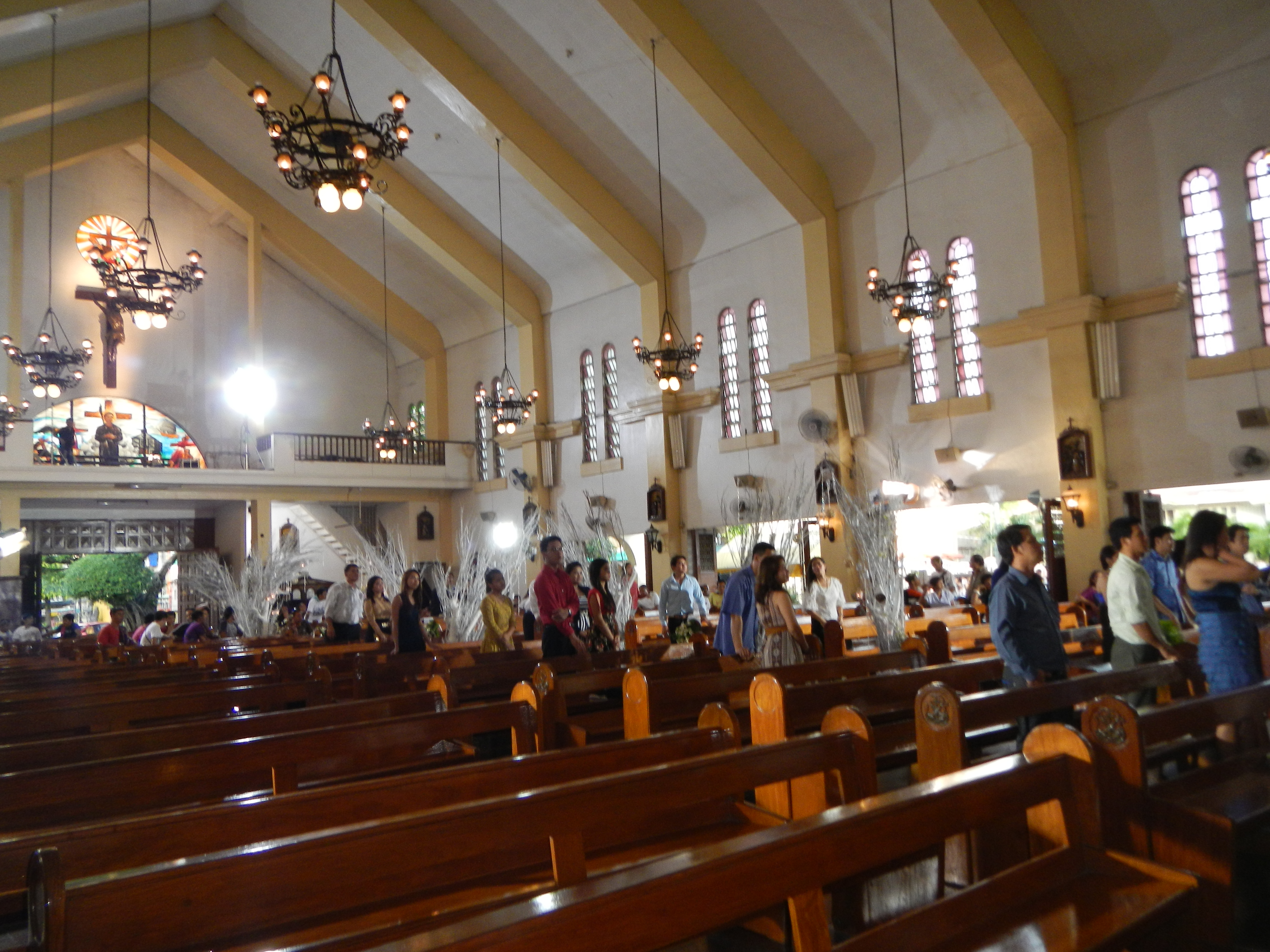
Filming of a scene at Santuario de San Pedro Bautista

The series' plug, teasers and opening title sequence were filmed on September 11, 2012, in a studio at GMA Network Center in Quezon City. Principal photography commenced on October 9, 2012. Many of the series' scenes were shot on location in Quezon City. Filming concluded in March 2013.

== Reception ==
=== Ratings ===
According to AGB Nielsen Philippines' Mega Manila household television ratings, the pilot episode of Temptation of Wife earned a 23.5% rating. The final episode scored a 27.9% rating.

=== Critical response ===
Vincent Anthon Garcia of Gulf News said that "Marian Rivera has proved why she is the "Queen of Primetime TV". Temptation of Wife, has zoomed to the top of the ratings." Mario Bautista of Journal complimented Glaiza de Castro, said that "one reason why Temptation of Wife clicks with viewers is the fact that de Castro is so effective as the villainous Heidi. We know she didn't want to play an antagonist again after she did lead roles in Grazilda and Biritera. Glaiza made the right decision in accepting the Heidi role as it's really so "mark" and she can show her versatility as an actress who can do both lead and villain roles."

== Accolades ==
Accolades received by Temptation of Wife
Year	Award	Category	Recipient	Result	Ref.
2012	4th FMTM Awards	2012 Top 10 Best Philippine TV Series	Temptation of Wife	Included	
2012	4th FMTM Awards	Best Actress in a Drama Series	Marian Rivera	Nominated	
2012	4th FMTM Awards	2012 Primetime Queen	Marian Rivera	Won	
2012	4th FMTM Awards	Most Popular TV Series Character as Chantal	Marian Rivera	Nominated	
2012	4th FMTM Awards	TV Entertainment Artist of the Year	Marian Rivera	Included	
2012	4th FMTM Awards	Most Popular TV Actress	Marian Rivera	Included	
2012	4th FMTM Awards	Most Popular TV Series Villain	Glaiza de Castro	Won	
2012	4th FMTM Awards	Most Promising New TV Series Love Team	Marian Rivera & Rafael Rosell	Nominated	
2013	8th Seoul International Drama Awards	Programmer's Choice for Best Drama Series	Temptation of Wife	Nominated	
2013	27th PMPC Star Awards for Television	Best Drama Actress	Marian Rivera	Won	
2013	18th Asian Television Awards	Best Actress in a Leading Role	Marian Rivera	Nominated	
2014	5th Golden Screen TV Awards	Outstanding Adapted Drama Program	Temptation of Wife	Won	
2014	5th Golden Screen TV Awards	Outstanding Performance by an Actress in a Drama Series	Marian Rivera	Nominated	
2014	5th Golden Screen TV Awards	Outstanding Supporting Actress in a Drama Series	Glaiza de Castro	Nominated	
2014	4th Northwest South Samar State University Students Choice Awards	Best Actress in a Primetime Teleserye	Marian Rivera	Won	
