= Temptation of Wife (South Korean TV series) =

Korean television series

- Promotional poster for Temptation of Wife
- Also known as: Wife's Temptation; Wife's Revenge; Cruel Temptation; Lure of Wife
- Hangul: 아내의 유혹
- Hanja: 아내의 誘惑
- RR: Anaeui yuhok
- MR: Anaeŭi yuhok
- Genre: Melodrama; Romance; Revenge
- Created by: Starmax; SBS
- Written by: Kim Soon-ok
- Directed by: Oh Se-kang
- Starring: Jang Seo-hee; Byun Woo-min; Kim Seo-hyung; Lee Jae-hwang
- Opening theme: "Can't Forgive" by Cha Soo Kyung
- Ending theme: Blue Wish by Yoo Young-Sun
- Composer: Yoo Young-sun
- Country of origin: South Korea
- Original language: Korean
- No. of episodes: 129

Production
- Executive producer: Go Hong Shik
- Producers: Shin Byung-chul; Shin Young-Yi
- Running time: 35 minutes
- Production companies: Shinyoung E&C Group

Original release
- Network: SBS TV
- Release: 3 November 2008 – 1 May 2009

Related
- Temptation of Wife (Philippine adaptation)

Temptation of Wife (Korean: 아내의 유혹; RR: Anaeui yuhok), also called Lure of Wife, is a South Korean television series starring Jang Seo-hee, Byun Woo-min, Kim Seo-hyung and Lee Jae-hwang. It aired on SBS TV every Mondays to Fridays at 19:20 from November 3, 2008, to May 1, 2009, for 129 episodes. Temptation of Wife was a highly watched drama in South Korea. Despite many controversies concerning the questionable content of the drama, it remains one of the most viewed dramas with a daily average viewership of around 30%, and netted the cast several awards including the Daesang (Grand Prize) for lead actress Jang Seo Hee at the SBS Drama Awards.

Temptation of Wife was part of the "Wife Trilogy", which includes Two Wives and Wife Returns. The series has localised adaptations from Indonesia, China, the Philippines, Vietnam, Turkey and Malaysia, as well as a 2009 male version of the series titled Temptation of an Angel.

== Plot summary ==
Goo Eun-jae (Jang Seo-hee) graduated as a make-up artist major at a university and began preparations to study in France. Her dreams to study abroad are halted by pregnancy after Jung Gyo-bin (Byun Woo-min) takes advantage of her when she is drunk. She decides to marry him and give up on her dreams in order to be a responsible mother to her unborn child. Eun-jae's pregnancy ends in a tragic miscarriage when she tries to protect her mother in law, Baek Mi-in (Geum Bo-ra), from being pushed down the steps by a creditor. Eun-jae falls and loses her baby. It takes a long time until Eun-jae becomes pregnant again. Around this time, Shin Ae-ri (Kim Seo-hyung) returns from her five-year-long studies from France where she studied make-up.

Ae-ri grew up in the same household as Eun-jae since she became an orphan at age ten. Her family was on the way to the Goo's household in order to have dinner with them when Ae-ri threw her clothes and doll at her father who was driving. As they were travelling in a storm, her father crashed the car. Both of Ae-ri's parents and her unborn younger sister died and the Goo Family took in Ae-ri and raised her for 20 years along with Eun-jae, treating her as if she was their own daughter. Later on, Ae-ri became the girlfriend of Eun-jae's brother, Kang-jae (Choi Joon-yong). Then, she left for France, revealing that someone was taking care of her tuitions for her.

After 7 years of living with the Jung family as Gyo-bin's housewife (and also as the housekeeper to the Jung family's mansion), Eun-jae soon discovers that her husband has been cheating on her with Ae-ri. It turns out that it was he who funded Ae-ri's travel to France. To add to this insult, Ae-ri reveals that she bore Gyo-bin's child five years prior named Jung Ni-no (Jung Yun-seok). Eun-jae's brother, Kang-jae, learns about the situation, upon which he sets out in anger to assault Gyo-bin. This event leads to Kang Jae and his mother in forcing Eun-jae to sign consent for a divorce. After the divorce, Gyo-bin and Ae-ri marry while Eun-jae moves back to her own family's house. Ae-ri goes to pay a visit to Eun-jae, demanding her to get an abortion. Eun-jae refuses to do so because of which Gyo-bin drags her to a gynecologist in Sokcho, forcing her into aborting their baby. Eun-jae again refuses. Gyo-bin then drives her to Sokcho Beach, throwing her necklace, given by her father-in-law as a promise not to give up on Gyo-bin, into the sea. Eun-jae tries to save the necklace, but not knowing how to swim, she soon finds herself being dragged away by the waves. Eun-jae begs Gyo-bin to save their baby but Gyo-bin ignores Eun-jae and abandons her at sea to drown and die. Ae-ri and Gyo-bin decide to keep this all a secret, lying that Eun-jae had committed suicide. Ae-ri fakes Eun-jae's suicide note which she gives to the police and Gyo-bin thereafter tells everybody that he had not seen Eun-jae the whole day.

In the midst of all this, Min Gun-woo (Lee Jae-hwang), the adoptive son of Lady Min (Jung Ae-ri) was near Sokcho in a search for his missing younger stepsister, Min So-hee (Chae Young-in). So-hee loved Gun-woo and wanted to marry him. When her mother, Lady Min refused, So-hee told Gun-woo to marry her secretly anyway. Gun-woo had decided not to tell his mother what was happening, as So-hee had run away from home. Lady Min arranged for another girl to marry Gun-woo, hoping that So-hee will give up and come back. So-hee arranges a marriage to Gun-woo on the same day as Lady Min arranges marriage. Gun-wo decides to follow his mother's wishes and marries the other girl. So-hee devastated that he did not come, then walks into the sea to drown herself. Gun-woo, searching for So-hee, finds Eun-jae's unconscious body instead. He then takes her to a physician doctor who reveals that she must lose the baby in order for her to be saved. Through the help of Gun-woo and the doctor, Eun-jae is allowed to live in the hospital for free where she worked at the same time to show her gratitude.

Lady Min, thinking Eun-jae's experience was similar to hers, introduces Eun-jae to her home. Thereafter, Eun-jae takes on the identity of So-hee, in order to seek revenge against Gyo-bin and Ae-ri who had destroyed her life and tried to kill her. Gun-woo falls in love with Eun-jae in the process and Eun-jae with Gun-woo, but Eun-jae decides to hold her feelings back for him in order to fulfill her revenge. Ae-ri gets suspicious of the woman claiming to be So-hee. One day, the two women meet and Ae-ri is positive that So-hee is Eun-jae. Eun-jae acted well and said that Ae-ri was crazy. Gyo-bin divorces Ae-ri and marries So-hee (Eun-jae). Gyo-bin kicks Ae-ri out of her house but keeps Ni-no, his son with Eun-jae.

Ae-ri gets even more suspicious and calls Gyo-bin when she sees So-hee (Eun-jae) and Gun-woo embrace each other. So-hee (Eun-jae) reassures that she loves Gyo-bin and that's why she has married him, ensuring him that Gun-woo and she are just close siblings. Gyo-bin wants to sleep with So-hee (Eun-jae), but she brings twin beds instead of one big bed and refuses his advances. Ae-ri begs for Gyo-bin and his family to give her son to her. Ae-ri gets Ni-no, but Ni-no gets injured and Ae-ri pities her son as she is now poor and would not be able to provide him a comfortable life. She returns Ni-no to Gyo-bin's family.

So-hee (Eun-jae) soon becomes worried about her true identity to be revealed by Ae-ri. So, with the help of Lady Min, they go to her parents and tells them the truth who helps her to have her true identity still covered. In order to complete her revenge, she tricks Gyo-bin to give all his family assets to her and her "mother" Lady Min, his father's company, their house, his mother's house and land and causes their family to go bankrupt. Lady Min had a history with Gyo Bin's father. They had a child together (they were not married) named Star. To Lady Min, Gyo Bin's father supposedly killed Star due to a sickness that was never treated and killed Lady Min's father by stealing their land. Lady Min gets revenge by telling him to give all his assets (including Cheonji Constructions) and selling his house because of charges on properties that were created by Gyo-bin to Lady Min. Because of this, he complied and gave them up. To humiliate his family further, Lady Min gets his family to switch houses with Eun-jae's family, or his large house will be auctioned and sold away. Ha-jo was reduced to being a carwasher and cleaner at Cheonji Constructions. Gyo-bin's family is now poor while Eun-jae's family is now living more comfortably. Gyo-bin says that he now loves Eun-jae and tries to force her to stay with him since they are still lawfully wedded but the disgusted Eun-jae hates him.

Eun-jae further terminated Ae-ri and plans to sell Ae-ri's beauty shop away. Upon discovering that the title deed of Mi-in's land is in Eun-jae's hands, Ae-ri came up with an ingenious plot to get her hands back on her beauty shop. Ae-ri first pleaded with Soo-bin, Gyo-bin's younger sister, and when this fails, Ae-ri sneaks into and manages to find Mi-in's title deed in Eun-jae's office. Hearing footsteps from outside, she hides behind the door and pushes whomsoever entered the office (who turns out to be Soo-bin) to prevent being identified as the thief, causing Soo-bin's right eye to be temporarily blind in the process, but Soo-bin manages to grab a button from Ae-ri's shirt. However, as Eun-jae discovers the injured Soo-bin, she was falsely blamed to have caused Soo-bin's injury. Ae-ri mortgaged Mi-in's title deed to unlicensed moneylenders in exchange for 1 billion won and successfully bought back her Beauty Shop. However, Eun-jae began to suspect Ae-ri was behind Soo-bin's injury, first, when Ha-neul wore Ae-ri's shirt with the missing button to the Goos (and which has the same buttons as the one which Soo-bin tore off from the culprit's shirt), and further, when Ae-ri was repeatedly harassed by the unlicensed moneylenders for failing to repay them on time.

The real So-hee appears, having suffered from serious depression. She gets mad at Eun-jae because Gun-woo has fallen in love with her and they had planned a wedding where So-hee later crashes. One day, when Eun-jae goes to work and everyone praises her for her make-up artist skills, So-hee tells all the workers that she was the real daughter of Lady Min and she proclaims herself the owner of Min Beauty Shop. Ae-ri sees this and asks So-hee to cooperate with her to ruin Eun-jae's life. First, they stole the 1 billion won which Eun-jae had borrowed from Lady Min to redeem Mi-in's title deed, which So-hee keeps for her own, causing Eun-jae to fail to redeem Mi-in's title deed when the unlicensed moneylenders feigned ignorance about their encounter with Eun-jae. Jang-jae confronted the unlicensed moneylenders who admitted that they handed Mi-in's title deed to Ae-ri. Jang-jae was furious, but Ae-ri pleaded with Kang-jae by falsely claiming Nino is his son and not Gyo-bin's in order that he would not hand her over to the police.

When Mi-in discovers that Ha-jo (Gyo-bin's father) formerly had a child with Lady Min, she plotted her revenge by abandoning Ha-neul (Ha-jo's sister-in-name) at a refuge centre and took away her handphone so that Ha-neul could not be contacted by anyone, but was spotted by Kang-jae in the process. Ha-neul was unhappy while in the refuge centre but was prevented from going out. Upon discovering Ha-neul was missing, Ha-jo confronted the Goos who informed them about Mi-in being last seen with Ha-neul, and as he leaves, he calls out the name of the child he had with Lady Min - "Star", which was overheard by Eun-jae. Eun-jae informed Lady Min of their suspicion that Star was still alive, and Ha-jo also confessed to Lady Min that Ha-neul is their daughter who is also still alive. Ae-ri overheard Mi-in's conversation with the refuge centre, and extorted another 1 billion won from Lady Min in exchange for Ha-neul's whereabouts. Lady Min complied with Ae-ri's demand, and Ae-ri ironically proceeded to "return" this sum to So-hee in order to redeem Mi-in's title deed from So-hee, and made use of the unlicensed moneylenders intends to remit this sum to Eun-jae's bank account in order to continue framing Eun-jae as the culprit behind Soo-bin's injury.

However, Ha-neul, being sick of staying in the refuge centre, was clever enough to inflict minor injuries on herself to make the refuge centre bring her to the hospital (remembering a prior instance where Jang-jae brought her to the hospital when she pretended to be choked by food in hopes that Kang-jae would kiss her), and to escape from the refuge centre's control. Ha-neul was eventually spotted by Kang-jae and Lady Min, and Lady Min spends her reunion with her eldest daughter by making meals and buying new clothes for her, while preventing Ha-jo from having access to Ha-neul. Mi-in was kicked out of the Jungs after being exposed by Ha-jo for abandoning Ha-neul at the refuge centre, only for her to subsequently return.

During a reunion dinner where Lady Min celebrates her recovery of Ha-neul, So-hee and Ha-neul do not see eye to eye with each other. So-hee even stages an incident to frame Eun-jae for pushing her down the stairs and pretends to be fearful of Eun-jae, which resulted Lady Min distrusting Eun-jae. However, Ha-neul accidentally records an audio conversation between Ae-ri and So-hee where So-hee revealed that she was feigning everything. Ha-neul was unhappy that Lady Min wanted her to cut ties with Eun-jae's family over So-hee, and Lady Min eventually relented by allowing her to see Ha-jo who brought her to Eun-jae's family, during which the audio conversation was overheard by Eun-jae. Soo-bin gradually recovers from her eye injury and begins to suspect Ae-ri as being responsible for her injury, finding Mi-in's title deed and handed it back to Eun-jae. Ae-ri was kicked out of the Jangs after being exposed by Eun-jae and Soo-bin for causing her eye injury, during which Eun-jae eventually returns Mi-in's title deed to her. However, So-hee threatened to jump off the hospital building, and Lady Min decided that Gun-woo's marriage to So-hee is to proceed notwithstanding her discovery that So-hee had framed Eun-jae for pushing her down the stairs. Ha-neul was unhappy that Eun-jae could not marry Gun-woo and attempts to sabotage So-hee's marriage by destroying her with Gun-woo but to no avail.

In order to regain the trust of the Jangs, Ae-ri approached various shareholders of Cheonji Constructions. Citing reasons relating to Lady Min's competency to manage the company due to So-hee's illness, Ae-ri persuaded them to divest their funds from the company and to allow Ha-jo to retake control of Cheonji Constructions. Lady Min was confronted by the shareholders (in a similar fashion as how Ha-jo was confronted by the shareholders before giving up his assets to Lady Min), but Ha-jo was able to pacify them. In order to restore the shareholders' confidence, Lady Min allowed Ha-jo to be the acting Chairman of Cheonji Constructions.

After Ha-neul used the loudspeaker at Cheonji Constructions to confess to Kang-jae and busked in an attempt to prove to Eun-jae's family that she would not be a menance, Ha-jo, Lady Min and Eun-jae's family all gave their respective consent for Kang-jae to marry Ha-neul. Following So-hee's marriage to Gun-woo, Eun-jae decides to focus on becoming the best make-up artist. She persuaded Lady Min to allow her family and Gyo-bin's family to switch their houses back.

Eun-jae continues to become the best makeup artist and lives now with her family. One day, Gun-woo goes to work to sign a contract with Harrison. Ae-ri wants to be back with Gyo-bin and bring back the position he had before and also the construction company, so Ha-jo (Kim Dong-hyun) tells Gyo-bin to sign the contract. Meanwhile, So-hee ruins Eun-jae's artwork and rips a page out. While they fight, Ae-ri calls Gyo-bin about how Eun-jae was being attacked by So-hee. Gun-woo turns the car and drives to the Beauty Shop. He sees So-hee ripping the page and tells her to divorce him. Gun-woo is now late for his meeting, so Ha-jo tells Gyo-bin to sign the contract instead. Gun-woo decides to divorce So-hee no matter what. Ae-ri comes back to the family, with reluctance from Gyo-bin. She makes Gyo-bin sleep with her, making her pregnant. While she is pregnant, doctors discover that she has a tumor in her stomach. Doctors reluctantly tell her to get an abortion so she could receive the cancer treatment, but she adamantly refuses. She felt that the baby was the only way to keep her and Gyo-bin together.

So-hee discovers that Ae-ri had caused her fallout with Gun-woo as well as her extortion of 1 billion won from Lady Min in exchange for Ha-neul's whereabouts. Lady Min confronted Ha-jo and Gyo-bin who were not aware of Ae-ri's tricks. Gyo-bin was furious and tricked Ae-ri into visiting the gynecologist, and Ae-ri runs off when Gyo-bin wants her to abort their second baby - in a similar fashion as how Gyo-bin wanted a forced abortion of Eun-jae's baby then.

Ae-rii and Eun-jae participate in a makeup competition that has three stages. After the first stage, Top 3 included Eun-jae, another lady and Ae-ri. They would be competing against one another. Ae-ri and Eun-jae win advances to the next round and would be competing against each other. In the third stage, Ae-ri gets desperate so she secretly bribes the judges at So-hee's instigation. The judges are just about to proclaim Ae-ri as the grand prize winner, but find out just in time about the bribes, so they disqualify Ae-ri and awards Eun-jae as the winner.

So-hee took over Ae-ri's beauty shop and sold it after Ae-ri failed to repay her with the 300 million won which was used to bribe the judges and which turned out to be loaned from So-hee. Ae-ri brought a drunk So-hee to near a port and laid her near the stairs. However, So-hee was subsequently beaten up by an unknown person, which resulted in Gyo-bin being listed as a prime suspect for hurting So-hee as Ae-ri had used So-hee's phone to call Gyo-bin before dumping So-hee by the port. However, when Gyo-bin discovers that Ae-ri has terminal cancer, he decided to shoulder the criminal liability for Ae-ri and was locked up as a result.

Ae-ri has a miscarriage, but this time after realizing her mistakes, Eun-jae find the heart to forgive her childhood best friend and both of them become true friends again. Eun-jae insists that Ae-ri get the cancer treatment, but Ae-ri is scared that the chemotherapy will make her not be as beautiful as she once was and also overwhelmed by the guilt of her past actions, and decides to let cancer kill her.

In order to allow Gyo-bin to spend tim with Ae-ri and Nino as a family for the final moment, Ha-jo pleaded with Lady Min to allow him bail. Gyo-bin and Ae-ri re-register their marriage, but just as the time is up, Ae-ri tells Gyo-bin that she would like to go on a honeymoon with him. Gyo-bin, deciding that he wanted to fulfil Ae-ri's last wish of going on a vacation, chose to escape from police's custody and become a fugitive, while his family and Eun-jae's family worked together to allow them to fulfill Ae-ri's final wish.

In the last episode, Ha-neul / Star (Oh Young-sil) becomes pregnant with her husband Kang-jae. Ae-ri and Gyo-bin, while on the run, during which Ae-ri makes a seashell necklace for Ni-no. Ae Ri begins to make two letters, one for Gyo-bin and the other for Eun-jae. Overwhelmed by her guilt and knowing that she will die someday, Ae-ri goes to the ocean to commit suicide but Gyo-bin attempts to save her. Ae-ri screams at him to let her go and tells him that he needs to take care of Ni-no and that she was going to die anyway. He tries to save her, but the ocean current is too strong. Both of them drown and dies. All the families attend their funeral. Eun-jae gives Ni-no the seashell necklace saying that it was the last present from his mother. Ni-no goes onto the street and a car nearly crashes into him. He states his mother and father were on the other side of the street. Everybody assumes that they were protecting their son from danger. Ae-ri's letter to Eun-jae says to bury her ashes on the beach where Eun-jae had almost died.

So-hee and Lady Min decide to go to the United States together. Lady Min gives Ha-jo the papers to own Cheonji Constructions once more. Gun-woo meets Eun-jae while she is spreading the ashes. He apologizes for hurting her feelings and says that he won't do it again. He feels that Eun-jae should be his wife. So-hee gives Eun-jae two rings and a letter entrusting Gun Woo to Eun-jae. Gun-woo puts his arm around Eun-jae and looks at the sky with her. They are sure that they see Ae-ri and Gyo-bin together. The whole drama ends by having the two couples smiling at each other.

== Cast ==
=== Main ===
- Jang Seo-hee as Goo Eun-jae / Min So-hee
- Byun Woo-min as Jung Gyo-bin
- Kim Seo-hyung as Shin Ae-ri / Michell Shin
- Lee Jae-hwang as Min Gun-woo

=== Supporting ===
Eun-jae's family

- Kim Yong-gun as Goo Young-soo

Eun-jae's father

- Yoon Mi-ra as Yoon Mi-ja

Eun-jae's mother

- Choi Joon-yong as Goo Kang-jae

Eun-jae's big brother

Gyo-bin's family

- Kim Dong-hyun as Jung Ha-jo

Gyo-bin's father

- Geum Bo-ra as Baek Mi-in

Gyo-bin's mother

- Oh Young-sil as Jung Ha-neul / Star

Gyo-bin's half sister, Lady Min and Ha-jo's love child

- Song Hee-ah as Jung Soo-bin

Gyo-bin's little sister

- Jung Yoon-seok as Jung Ni-no

Gyo-bin & Ae-ri's son

Gun-woo's family

- Jung Ae-ri as Min Hyun-joo / Lady Min

Gun-woo's adoptive mother

- Chae Young-in as Min So-hee

Gun-woo's adopt little sister

== Controversy ==
Temptation of Wife has been widely criticized for its content and production. It gained criticism from audiences when Eun Jae comes back as So Hee by drawing a mole on her left cheek and everyone fails to recognize her as Eun Jae. Other characters also believe that So Hee is not Eun Jae because of the different personalities. Other controversies were related to the speediness of the drama and overly set up plot. Furthermore, there was a lawsuit involving author Jung Hye Kyung, who claimed that Temptation of a Wife plagiarized her book Janus' City.

== Ratings ==
Original broadcast date	Average audience share	
Original broadcast date	TNmS Ratings	
Original broadcast date	Nationwide	Seoul National Capital Area
3 November 2008 (Premiere)	11.9% (10th)	12.2% (10th)
1 May 2009 (Finale)	29.5% (1st)	29.1% (1st)
10 November 2008 (Lowest)	11.1% (10th)	10.9% (9th)
12 February 2009 (Highest)	40.6% (1st)	42.3% (1st)
Average		

== Adaptations ==
=== Temptation of an Angel ===
A male version of Temptation of Wife, starring Bae Soo-bin and Lee So-yeon, was broadcast on SBS in late 2009.

=== The Temptation to Go Home (Chinese adaptation) ===
In Mainland China, the remake of Temptation of Wife is called The Temptation to Go Home. The series was produced in collaboration with South Korea, starring Choo Ja-hyun as the leading female Lin Pinru, Ling Xiao-su as the leading male Hong Shixian, and Rain Lee as Ai Li. Both the original and the remake received high ratings in China. The film also catapulted Choo into stardom and made her one of the most sought-after Hallyu stars in China. The series also features the Chinese version of the opening theme "Can't Forgive" by Cha Soo-kyung, performed by Li Jialu. February 21 2011 to March 31 2011 broadcast on Hunan TV

=== Temptation of Wife (Philippine adaptation) ===
In the Philippines, GMA Network produced a Filipino remake of Temptation of Wife. It was broadcast on GMA from October 29, 2012 to April 5, 2013.

=== Dendam Seorang Isteri (Malaysian adaptation) ===
Radius One Sdn. Bhd. has picked up to produce a Malaysian version of Temptation of Wife, known as Dendam Seorang Isteri _{[MS]} (lit. 'Revenge of a Wife'), which will broadcast on Astro Prima beginning March 21, 2022 to July 15, 2022.

=== Ngoại tình với vợ (Vietnamese adaptation) ===
In Vietnam, SCTV produced the remake of Temptation of Wife called Ngoại tình với vợ. It was broadcast on SCTV Phim Viet from September 11 to October 20, 2015

=== Kesetiaan Cinta and Pengorbanan Anggun (Indonesian unofficial adaptation) ===
MD Entertainment, an Indonesian famous production house for producing television program, produced an unofficial Indonesian version of Temptation of Wife, entitled Kesetiaan Cinta which was broadcast on SCTV, Indonesia by November 24, 2009 to July 11, 2010. This version was quite popular by that time.

While Indosiar, another Indonesian television network, broadcast another tv series, named Pengorbanan Anggun produced by Genta Buana Paramitha (another Indonesian famous production house), by December 2, 2009 to January 6, 2010, with almost similar plot to Temptation of Wife, but unfortunately, this version was not so successful.

Beni Affet (turkish adaptation) In turkish star tv turkey the remake of temptation of wife combined with temptation of an angel called beni affet it was broadcast on star tv turkey from October 17, 2011 - December 28, 2018
