= Grimae Awards =

Korean television awards

- Hangul: 그리메상
- RR: Geurimesang
- MR: Kŭrimesang
- Awarded for: Best in Drama, Documentary, TV Commercial and Variety Show
- Country: South Korea
- Presented by: The Korean Directors of Photography Society (KDPS)
- First award: 1993
- Final award: 2025
- Website: www.koreandps.or.kr

Grimae Awards (Korean: 그리메상) recognize cinematographers who demonstrate outstanding visual aesthetics and creativity, with judging criteria including artistic merit, image quality, and experimental spirit.

== History ==
Established in 1993, the awards are held annually. Since 2018, they have been organized by the Korean Directors of Photography Society, an association formed on December 7, 2018, through the merger of the original Korean Directors of Photography Society and the Korean Association of Camera Directors.

== Awards category ==
- Grand Prize
- Best Picture
- Excellence Award
- Regional Award
- Best Cinematographer
- Best New Cinematographer
- Best Actor
- Best Actress

== Ceremony ==
Edition	Year	Venue	Ref.
10	1996	63 Building, Cosmos Hall, Seoul	
13	2000		
14	2001		
15	2002		
16	2003	Korea Broadcasting Center in Mok-dong, Yangcheon-gu, Seoul	
17	2004	Korea Broadcasting Center in Mok-dong, Yangcheon-gu, Seoul	
18	2005	Korea Broadcasting Center in Mok-dong, Yangcheon-gu, Seoul	
19	2006	Korea Broadcasting Center in Mok-dong, Yangcheon-gu, Seoul	
20	2007	Korea Broadcasting Center in Mok-dong, Yangcheon-gu, Seoul	
21	2008	Korea Broadcasting Center in Mok-dong, Yangcheon-gu, Seoul	
22	2009	Korea Broadcasting Center in Mok-dong, Yangcheon-gu, Seoul	
23	2010	Korea Broadcasting Center in Mok-dong, Yangcheon-gu, Seoul	
24	2011	Korea Broadcasting Center in Mok-dong, Yangcheon-gu, Seoul	
25	2012	Korea Broadcasting Center in Mok-dong, Yangcheon-gu, Seoul	
26	2013	Korea Broadcasting Center in Mok-dong, Yangcheon-gu, Seoul	
27	2014	Korea Broadcasting Center in Mok-dong, Yangcheon-gu, Seoul	
28	2015	KBS New Building Hall in Yeouido-dong, Yeongdeungpo-gu, Seoul	
29	2016	KBS New Building Hall in Yeouido-dong, Yeongdeungpo-gu, Seoul	
30	2017	KBS New Building Hall in Yeouido-dong, Yeongdeungpo-gu, Seoul	
31	2018	KBS New Building Hall in Yeouido-dong, Yeongdeungpo-gu, Seoul	
32	2019	Stanford Hotel in Sangam-dong, Seoul	
33	2020	Stanford Hotel in Sangam-dong, Seoul	
34	2021	Stanford Hotel in Sangam-dong, Seoul	
35	2022	Stanford Hotel in Sangam-dong, Seoul	
36	2023	M Lounge of the MBC building, Mapo-gu, Seoul	
37	2024	M Lounge of the MBC building, Mapo-gu, Seoul	
38	2025	M Lounge of the MBC building, Mapo-gu, Seoul	

== Grand Prize ==
#	Year	Work	Recipient
13	2000	Autumn in My Heart	Jung Yeon-doo
14	2001	Ant	Ko Seung-woo
15	2002	Mating season – Wildlife in Serengeti	Park Hwa-jin, Baek Seung-woo
16	2003	Damo	Kim Kyung-chul, Lee Yeon-jae
17	2004	Pottery	Kim Seung-yeon
18	2005	Emperor of the Sea	Kim Seung-hwan
19	2006	Jumong	Noh Yeong-sik, Hong Sung-wook
20	2007	Asian Corridor in Heaven	Baek Hong-jong, Yoo Jae-kwang, Woo sung-joo
21	2008	East of Eden	Ha Jae-young, Jung Seung-woo
22	2009	Queen Seondeok	Kim Se-hong, Chae Soo-chang
23	2010	The Slave Hunters	Kim Jae-hwan, Son Hyeong-sik
24	2011	Secret Garden	Hee Dae-seon, Lee Seung-jun
25	2012	Super Fish – An Endless Adventure	Choo Jae-man, Yoo Jae-kwang, Park Yong-hwan
26	2013	Scandal: A Shocking and Wrongful Incident	Jung Seung-woo, Kim Seon-chul
27	2014	My Love From the Star	Lee Gil-bok, Jang Min-gyun
28	2015	Yong-pal	Yoon Dae-young, Choi Jae-rak
29	2016	Descendants of the Sun	Kim Si-hyung, Uhm Jun-sung
30	2017	Strategy of Life – Breeding	Hong Eui-won
31	2018	Bad Papa	
32	2019	Memory of Water	Ha Sung-chang
33	2020	Hot Stove League	
34	2021	The Penthouse: War in Life 2, 3	Lee Jong-seok, Jeon Se-woon, Lee Seung-hoon, Lee Jae-seong
35	2022	EBS DocuPrime: 100 Years of Women	Lim Hyung-eun
36	2023	My Dearest	Kim Hwa-young, Jeon Ho-seung, Kim Dae-hyun
37	2024	Glacier Trilogy - KBS1's Documentary Project	Hong Sung-jun, Jeong Yeon-jin, Park Chan-jun, Kang Seung-woo
38	2025	Boundary Exploration Panorama: Walls of the World — G1 Broadcasting's UHD documentary	Kim Sang-min, Shin Ik-kyun, Shim Deok-hyun, Kim Jong-seok

== Best Picture ==
=== Drama ===
#	Year	Drama	Cinematographer
13	2000	Hur Jun	Kim Young-chul
14	2001	Guardian Angel	
15	2002	Happy Birthday	Lee Young-chul
16	2003	Finding the World	Ko Seung-woo
17	2004	Count of Myeongdong	Kim Yong-sang
18	2005	Fashion 70's	Lee Young-chul
19	2006	Invisible man, Choe Jang-su	Park Nam-jun
20	2007	Lobbyist	Lee Young-chul, Bae Hong-soo
21	2008	Painter of the Wind	Bae Hong-soo
22	2009	Cain and Abel	Kim Hong-jae
23	2010	Giant	Lee Gil-bok, Lee Sang-wook
24	2011	The Greatest Love	Kim Se-hong, Oh Gyu-taek
25	2012	Moon Embracing the Sun	Kim Seon-il, Jung Seung-woo
26	2013	Good Doctor	Kim Jae-hwan
27	2014	Mama	Kim Seon-il, Hwang Seong-man
28	2015	Mask	Hong Sung-gil, Kim Hong-jae
29	2016	Marriage Contract	Lee Jin-seok, Han Yil-song
30	2017	Innocent Defendant	Jung Min-gyun, Song Yo-hoon
31	2018	Bad Papa	Kim Hwa-young, Park Chang-soo
32	2019	The Fiery Priest	Yoon Dae-young, Park Jong-ki
33	2020	Hot Stove League	
34	2021	—N/a	
35	2022	—N/a	
36	2023	Silence of the Lambs	Heo Eun-A
37	2024	Doubt	Lee Jin-seok, Lee Deok-hoon

=== Documentary ===
#	Year	Documentary	Cinematographer
13	2000	Eum Hong-gil, back in the middle of Kangcheng	Kim Jong-hwan, Jung Ha-young
14	2001	The world of digital sound	Kim Hyung-tak
15	2002	Mississippi red eared tortoise, occupy the Han River	Kim Hyo-joo, Kim Si-hyung
16	2003	Forest of Bongamsa	Lee Ji-sung
17	2004	Changtang – the unconquered land	Lee Tae-sul, Park Chang-soo
18	2005	Mud	Lee Eui-ho
19	2006	Enchanting energy, color	Park Eun-sang
20	2007	DNZ is alive	Kim Yong-nam
21	2008	Centipede	Lee Chang-yeol
22	2009	Spirit of the wind	Seo Young-ho
23	2010	Tears of the Amazon	Song In-hyuk, Kim Man-tae
24	2011	Amour	Byun Chun-ho, Oh Jae-sang
25	2012	Civilization and Mathematics	Jung Jae-ho
26	2013	Uigwe, the 8-Day Festival	Paek Hong Kong
27	2014	The Human Condition	Kim Seung-hwan, Joo Han
28	2015	The Mystery of Evolution – Poison	Hong Ui-kwon
29	2016	A Great Meal	Lee Young-gwan, Kim Hwa-young
30	2017	Journey on Foot – Tears of God	Hong Sung-joon
31	2018	THE Squirrel	Jung Ki-hyun
34	2021	UBC Kitchen Garden, MBC Docuplex - Eastern Labyrinth	
36	2025	Liberation 80th Anniversary Special Documentary	Kim Hwa-young, Jeon Ho-seung

=== TV Commercial ===
#	Year	TV Commercial	Cinematographer
26	2013	Fidelia	Park Young, Heo Se-kwan

=== Variety Show ===
#	Year	Variety Show	Cinematographer
31	2018	Inkigayo	Lee Hyung-suk
32	2019	Hello Rookie with KOCCA	Lee Sung-soo
36	2025	Inkigayo	Lee Seok-hoon, Kim Ji-hyun, Moon Chan-heum

=== Show/Broadcast ===
#	Year	Documentary	Cinematographer
36	2025	Liberation 80th Anniversary KBS Special: Cho Yong-pil, Forever Lee Soon-jae	Park Jun-soo, Yang Jin-yong, Son Yeon-seok, Lee Jun-beom, Lee Hee-ju, Kim Hyun-woo

== Excellence Award ==
=== Drama ===
#	Year	Work	Network	Cinematographer
34	2021	Lovers of the Red Sky	SBS	Hwang In-hyeok, Eom Si-tak
34	2021	Landscape of Pain	KBS	Lee Won-kyung
35	2022	The Red Sleeve	MBC	Kim Hwa-young, Kim Seong-han, Jung Soon-dong
36	2023	KBS Drama Special 2022: Silence of the Lambs	KBS	Heo Guk-hoe
37	2024	Knight Flower	MBC	Kim Seong-ban, Jung Soon-dong
38	2025	The Winning Try	SBS	Lee Seung-ju, Lee Jae-sung

=== Documentary ===
#	Year	Work	Network	Cinematographer
34	2021	Jeju Pig, Shaking Taste Buds	JIBS	Kim Dong-young, Kim Gyeong-yoon
34	2021	Documentary Insight - Colorful Rainbow	KBS	Seung Se-ri
35	2022	SBS Special: Monkey City	SBS	Park Jong-gi, Park Chan-woong
36	2023	KBS UHD Environment Special 2, Part 8: There is No Earth for the Dead	KBS	Lee Hee-ju
37	2024	Documentary K: We Are the Chosen People, Part 1: The Nation for the People	EBS	Kim Seung-min
38	2025	Documentary Insight	KBS	Park Chan-jun

=== Studio/Video ===
#	Year	Work	Network	Cinematographer
34	2021	Kim-Gam-Gi - Women and Humanity	EBS	EBS Studio Video Team
35	2022	Your Literacy Plus	EBS	EBS Studio Video Team
36	2023	SBS Inkigayo	SBS	Jin Seung-jae, Kim Deok-ju, Kim Yeon-jun, Lee Cheol, Jo Jin-hyun, Song Nak-hoon, Hwang In-wook, Lee Cheol-ho
37	2024	The PD Disappeared	MBC	Ma Sang-yeop
38	2025	Ding Dong Dang Dong	EBS	Lee Eung-seok, Ahn Joon-young

=== Regional ===
#	Year	Work	Network	Cinematographer
35	2022	—N/a		
36	2023	Traveler of the Earth	UBC	Lee Hee-jin
37	2024	Hello, Tony	TBC	Jeon Jin-wook

=== Show/Music ===
#	Year	Work	Network	Cinematographer
37	2024	2024 Show! Music Core in JAPAN	MBC	Kim Sang-hun

== Regional Award ==
#	Year	Work	Network	Cinematographer
34	2021	Kim Jong-seok, Kim Sang-in	G1	Wandering - Going to the DMZ
34	2021	Ju Dong-wook	Busan MBC	Forbidden Alley - 16th Part
35	2022	Kim Deok-gon, Yang Ho-geun	KBS Jeju	Jeju 4.3 Special Human Documentary: Sukja
36	2023	Jung Yeon-il, Lee Jung-chan, Lee Soo-hwan, Kim Hyun-woo	KBS Busan	Image in Busan
37	2024	Lee Gwang-hoon, Son Cheol-yong	Regional Broadcasters / CJB Cheongju	Regional Joint Production, 4K Documentary: Sand Date in Asia
38	2025	Kim Deok-gon, Jo Byeong-woo	KBS Jeju	Return of the Hero: Replay

== Best Cinematographer ==
#	Year	Cinematographer	Affiliation	Work
34	2021	Ham Eun-soo	MBC	

== Best New Cinematographer ==
#	Year	Cinematographer	Affiliation	Work
34	2021	Kim Hyun-myung	Wonju MBC	In Gangwon, A Home
35	2022	Yeom Han-rim	SBS	SBS Special: Bear Hand Cafe
35	2022	Lee Won-seok	EBS	DocuPrime: Children's Rights, Part 3: The Time Called Childhood
36	2023	Ryu Dong-jeon	KBS Jeju	UHD Soundscape Documentary: Mute
37	2024	Choi Ji-won	Wonju MBC	I Know the Blue Bird of Happiness
38	2025	Gil Chae-geun	KBS	Fighting Does Not Lose

== Best Director ==
#	Year	Recipient	Affiliation	Work
34	2021	Lee Jeong-ho	UBC	Garden of Seasons, Kitchen Garden
35	2022	—N/a		
36	2023	Kim Seong-yong, Cheon Soo-jin, Lee Han-joon	MBC TV	My Dearest
37	2024	Song Yeon-hwa	MBC TV	Doubt

== Best Editor ==
#	Year	Recipient	Affiliation	Work
37	2024	Kim Hee-seong, Lee Ji-hye	MBC	Doubt

== Best Actor ==
#	Year	Actor	Work
9	1996	Yoo Dong-geun	Lovers
10	1997	Choi Soo-jong	First Love
11	1998	Choi Bool-am	You and I
12	1999	Son Chang-min	Kuk Hee
13	2000	Kim Yeong-cheol	Taejo Wang Geon
14	2001	Lee Jae-ryong	Sangdo
15	2002	Kam Woo-sung	Hyun-jung, I Love You
16	2003	Cha Seung-won	Bodyguard
17	2004	Ahn Jae-wook	Oh Feel Young
18	2005	Kim Myung-min	Immortal Admiral Yi Sun-sin
19	2006	Song Il-gook	Jumong
20	2007	Kim Myung-min	Behind the White Tower
21	2008	Kim Sang-kyung	The Great King, Sejong
22	2009	So Ji-sub	Cain and Abel
23	2010	Jang Hyuk	The Slave Hunters
24	2011	Cha Seung-won	The Greatest Love
25	2012	Lee Sung-min	Golden Time
26	2013	Cho Jae-hyun	Scandal: A Shocking and Wrongful Incident
27	2014	Lee Jong-suk	Pinocchio
28	2015	Yeon Jung-hoon	Mask
29	2016	Kim Eung-soo	The Imjin War 1592
30	2017	Ji Sung	Innocent Defendant
31	2018	Jang Hyuk	Bad Papa
32	2019	Kim Nam-gil	The Fiery Priest
33	2020	Namkoong Min	Hot Stove League
34	2021	Um Ki-joon	The Penthouse: War in Life
35	2022	—N/a	
36	2023	Namkoong Min	My Dearest
37	2024	Han Suk-kyu	Doubt
38	2025	—N/a	

== Best Actress ==
#	Year	Actor	Work
9	1996	Hwang Shin-hye	Lovers
10	1997	Choi Myung-gil	Tears of the Dragon
11	1998	Choi Jin-sil	You and I
12	1999	Kim Hye-soo	Kuk Hee
13	2000	Hwang Soo-jung	Hur Jun
14	2001	Kang Soo-yeon	Ladies of the Palace
15	2002	Yoo Ho-jeong	Man of the Sun, Lee Je-ma
16	2003	Kim Hee-ae	Perfect Love
17	2004	Kim Jung-eun	Lovers in Paris
18	2005	Kim Sun-a	My Lovely Sam Soon
19	2006	Yoon Eun-hye	The Vineyard Man
20	2007	Jang Jin-young	Lobbyist
21	2008	Moon Geun-young	Painter of the Wind
22	2009	Lee Yo-won	Queen Seondeok
23	2010	Hwang Jung-eum	Giant
24	2011	Ha Ji-won	Secret Garden
25	2012	Kim Nam-joo	My Husband Got a Family
26	2013	Lee Bo-young	I Can Hear Your Voice
27	2014	Song Yoon-ah	Mama
28	2015	Soo Ae	Mask
29	2016	Uee	Marriage Contract
30	2017	Seo Hyun-jin	Temperature of Love
31	2018	Kim Sun-a	Should We Kiss First?
32	2019	Jeong Yu-mi	Partners for Justice 2
33	2020	Park Eun-bin	Hot Stove League
34	2021	Kim So-yeon	The Penthouse: War in Life
35	2022	—N/a	
36	2023	Ahn Eun-jin	My Dearest
37	2024	Chae Won-bin	Doubt
38	2025	—N/a	

== Best New Actor/Actress ==
#	Year	Actor	Work
28	2015	Jo Bo-ah	All About My Mom
29	2016	Yoon Kyun-sang	Six Flying Dragons
30	2017	Key	The Guardians
31	2018	Jung Chae-yeon	To. Jenny
32	2019	Rowoon	Extraordinary You
33	2020	Shin Su-hyun	Woman of 9.9 Billion
34	2021	Lee Shin-ki	Scenery of Pain

== Best Entertainer Award ==
#	Year	Entertainer
32	2019	Mamamoo

== See also ==
- List of Asian television awards
