= 2024 MBC Drama Awards =

43rd edition of award ceremony

- Official poster
- Date: Ceremony: December 30, 2024 Broadcast: January 5, 2025
- Site: MBC Media Center Public Hall, Sangam-dong, Mapo-gu, Seoul
- Hosted by: Kim Sung-joo; Chae Soo-bin
- Official website: MBC Drama Awards

Highlights
- Grand Prize (Daesang): Han Suk-kyu

Television coverage
- Network: MBC; Naver Now; YouTube; (Recorded)
- Viewership: Ratings: 3.5%; Viewership: 674,000

The 2024 MBC Drama Awards, presented by Munhwa Broadcasting Corporation (MBC) took place at MBC Media Center Public Hall in Sangam-dong, Mapo-gu, Seoul on December 30, 2024. Kim Sung-joo hosted the award ceremony sixth year in succession, along with Chae Soo-bin, in her first hosting assignment since her debut. The award ceremony which was scheduled to broadcast live on MBC, Naver Now and YouTube along with the red carpet photo session was cancelled, due to the Jeju Air Flight 2216 accident.

The '2024 MBC Drama Awards' was broadcast on the January 5, 2025 as recorded version, rescheduled due to seven days national mourning for Jeju Air Flight 2216 accident victims. Han Suk-kyu was awarded Grand Prize (Daesang) for his performance in Doubt whereas Chief Detective 1958 was awarded as Drama of the Year.

== Winners and nominees ==
Nominations for the best couple award were revealed on December 18, 2024, and for Daesang (Grand Prize) on December 27, 2024.

Winners are listed first and denoted in bold.

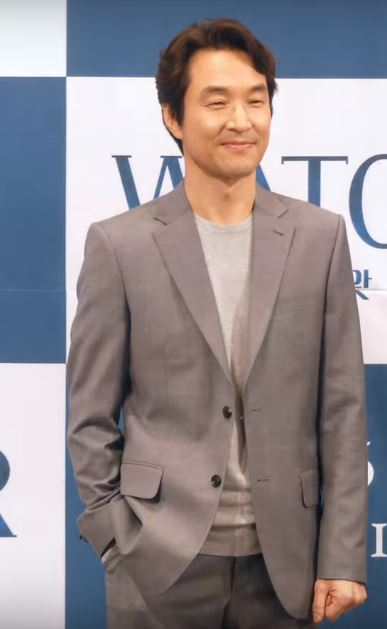
Han Suk-kyu, winner of Grand Prize (Daesang)

Grand Prize (Daesang)	Drama of the Year
**Han Suk-kyu – Doubt**; Lee Hanee – Knight Flower; Kim Nam-joo – Wonderful World; Lee Je-hoon – Chief Detective 1958; Kim Hee-sun – Bitter Sweet Hell; Byun Yo-han – Black Out; Yoo Yeon-seok – When the Phone Rings	**Chief Detective 1958**; Bitter Sweet Hell; Black Out; Doubt; Knight Flower; Wonderful World; When the Phone Rings
Top Excellence Award, Actor in a Miniseries	Top Excellence Award, Actress in a Miniseries
**Lee Je-hoon – Chief Detective 1958**; **Yoo Yeon-seok – When the Phone Rings**; Han Suk-kyu – Doubt; Byun Yo-han – Black Out; Cha Eun-woo – Wonderful World	**Lee Hanee – Knight Flower**; Kim Nam-joo – Wonderful World; Kim Hee-sun – Bitter Sweet Hell; Lee Hye-young – Bitter Sweet Hell
Top Excellence Award, Actor in a Daily/Short Drama	Top Excellence Award, Actress in a Daily/Short Drama
**Seo Jun-young – The Brave Yong Su-jeong**; Jung Sang-hoon – The Pork Cutlets; Yoon Sun-woo – The Third Marriage	**Uhm Hyun-kyung – The Brave Yong Su-jeong**; **Oh Seung-ah – The Third Marriage**; Yoon Hae-young – The Third Marriage; Lee Seung-yeon – The Brave Yong Su-jeong; Jeon Hye-bin – The Pork Cutlets
Best Actor Award	Best Actress Award
**Byun Yo-han – Black Out**	**Kim Nam-joo – Wonderful World**
Excellence Award, Actor in a Miniseries	Excellence Award, Actress in a Miniseries
**Lee Jong-won – Knight Flower**; **Lee Dong-hwi - Chief Detective 1958**; Kim Kang-woo – Wonderful World; Kim Nam-hee – Bitter Sweet Hell; Ko Jun – Black Out	**Chae Soo-bin – When the Phone Rings**; Go Bo-gyeol – Black Out; Seo Eun-soo - Chief Detective 1958; Yeonwoo – Bitter Sweet Hell; Im Se-mi – Wonderful World
Excellence Award, Actor in a Daily/Short Drama	Excellence Award, Actress in a Daily/Short Drama
**Moon Ji-hoo – The Third Marriage**; Kwon Hwa-woon – The Brave Yong Su-jeong; Park Young-woon – The Third Marriage; Lee Joong-ok – The Pork Cutlets	**Oh Se-young – The Third Marriage**; Kim Soo-jin – The Pork Cutlets; Lim Ju-eun – The Brave Yong Su-jeong; Ji Su-won – The Brave Yong Su-jeong
Best Supporting Actor	Best Supporting Actress
**Jo Jae-yoon – Knight Flower & Black Out**; Kwon Hae-hyo – Black Out & Bitter Sweet Hell; Kim Kwang-kyu – Knight Flower; Yoon Kyung-ho – Doubt	**Kim Mi-kyung – Knight Flower & Black Out**; Bae Jong-ok – Black Out; Choi Yu-hwa – Doubt; Chu Sang-mi – When the Phone Rings; Han Ye-ri – Doubt
Best New Actor	Best New Actress
**Heo Nam-jun – When the Phone Rings**; **Lee Ga-sub – Black Out**; Kim Jeong-jin – Doubt; Roh Jae-won – Doubt; Choi Woo-sung – Chief Detective 1958	**Chae Won-bin – Doubt**; Park Se-hyun – Knight Flower; Jang Gyu-ri – When the Phone Rings; Chung Su-bin – Chief Detective 1958
Best Character Award	Best Couple Award
**Kwon Hae-hyo – Black Out & Bitter Sweet Hell**; **Jung Sang-hoon – The Pork Cutlets**	**Yoo Yeon-seok and Chae Soo-bin – When the Phone Rings**; Lee Jong-won and Lee Hanee – Knight Flower; Lee Hye-young and Kim Hee-sun – Bitter Sweet Hell; Han Suk-kyu and Chae Won-bin – Doubt; Lee Je-hoon and Lee Dong-hwi – Chief Detective 1958
Lifetime Award	Special Plaque of Appreciation Award
**Choi Bool-am**	**Kim Soo-mi** (posthumous award)

== See also ==
- 2024 SBS Drama Awards
- 2024 KBS Drama Awards
