= Lee Jong-won (model) =

South Korean model and actor (born 1994)

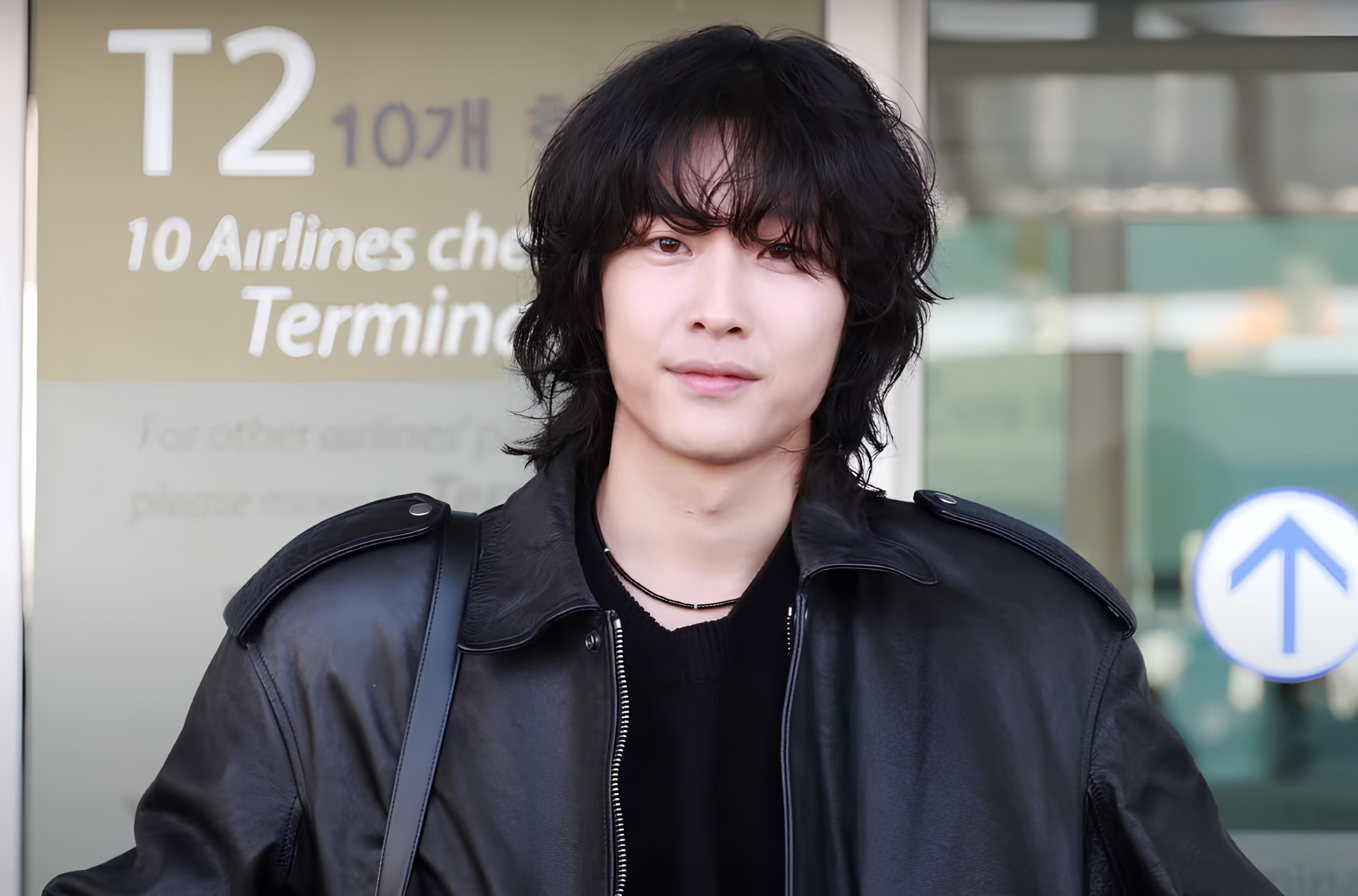
- Lee in March 2024
- Born: Lee Jong-won; December 31, 1994 (age 31); South Korea
- Occupations: Model; actor
- Years active: 2017–present
- Agent: The Black Label
- Height: 184 cm (6 ft 0 in)

Korean name
- Hangul: 이종원
- RR: I Jongwon
- MR: I Chongwŏn

Lee Jong-won (Korean: 이종원; born December 31, 1994) is a South Korean model and actor. He debuted as a model in 2017 before venturing into acting in 2018, and is known for his roles in the television series Knight Flower (2024) and Brewing Love (2024).

== Life and career ==
Lee fulfilled his military service in 2015, before he debuted in the entertainment industry. He served at the Republic of Korea Army Mark Army 30th Mechanized Infantry Division.

Lee debuted as a model in 2017 before venturing into acting in 2018 with the web drama Go, Baek Diary. He signed an exclusive contract with agency The Black Label in 2023.

== Filmography ==
=== Film ===
Year	Title	Role	Notes	Ref.
2018	Regret			
2019	Our Baseball	Kim Kyung-shik		
2019	Family Affair	Soo-wan		
2020	My Dream	Noh Jun-su		
2026	Salmokji: Whispering Water	Yoon Ki-tae		

=== Television series ===
Year	Title	Role	Notes	Ref.
2019	How to Hate You	Go Eun-tae	two act-drama	
2019	Issue Makers	Kim Jong-won		
2019	Farming Academy Season 2	Woo-jin	Four act-drama	
2020	My Unfamiliar Family	Ahn Hyo-sook		
2020	In Your Dream	Noh Joon-soo		
2020	Twenty-Twenty	Jayden		
2020	The Spies Who Loved Me	Tinker		
2021	Hospital Playlist 2	Kim Geon-eun		
2022	The Golden Spoon	Hwang Tae-young		
2024	Knight Flower	Park Soo-ho		
2024	Bad Memory Eraser	Lee San		
2024	Brewing Love	Yun Min-ju		

=== Web series ===
Year	Title	Role	Ref.
2018	Pack to the Future	Park Dong-ki	
2018	Go, Back Diary	Do Jae-hyun	
2018	Sul I Met with a Bag	Joo-won	
2018	What Are You Doing for Christmas?	Jong wook	
2019	Who Did I Kiss Last Night	Hwang Ji-an	
2019	Ghostderella	Jin-soo	
2019	Our Baseball	Kim Kyung-shik	
2019	Jal Pa Gin Love	Chris Ahn	
2020	XX	Wang Jung-deun / Jayden	
2020	Amanza	Park Dong-yeon	
2020	The School Nurse Files	Student	
2020	The Actors I Love Series	Narrator	

=== Music video appearances ===
Year	Song Title	Artist	Ref.
2018	"For Your Ears Only"	Lee Seung-hwan (feat. Stella Jang)	
2018	"Luv Highway"	Eyedi	
2021	"Strawberry Moon"	IU	

== Awards and nominations ==
Name of the award ceremony, year presented, category, nominee of the award, and the result of the nomination
Award ceremony	Year	Category	Nominee / Work	Result	Ref.
APAN Star Awards	2024	Excellence Award Actor in Miniseries	Knight Flower	Nominated	
Baeksang Arts Awards	2024	Best New Actor – Television	Knight Flower	Nominated	
Blue Dragon Film Awards	2026	Best New Actor	Salmokji: Whispering Water	Pending	
MBC Drama Awards	2022	Best New Actor	The Golden Spoon	Won	
MBC Drama Awards	2024	Best Couple Award	Lee Jong-won (with Lee Ha-nee); Knight Flower	Nominated	
MBC Drama Awards	2024	Excellence Award, Actor in a Miniseries	Knight Flower	Won	
