= Moon Ji-hoo =

South Korean actor and model

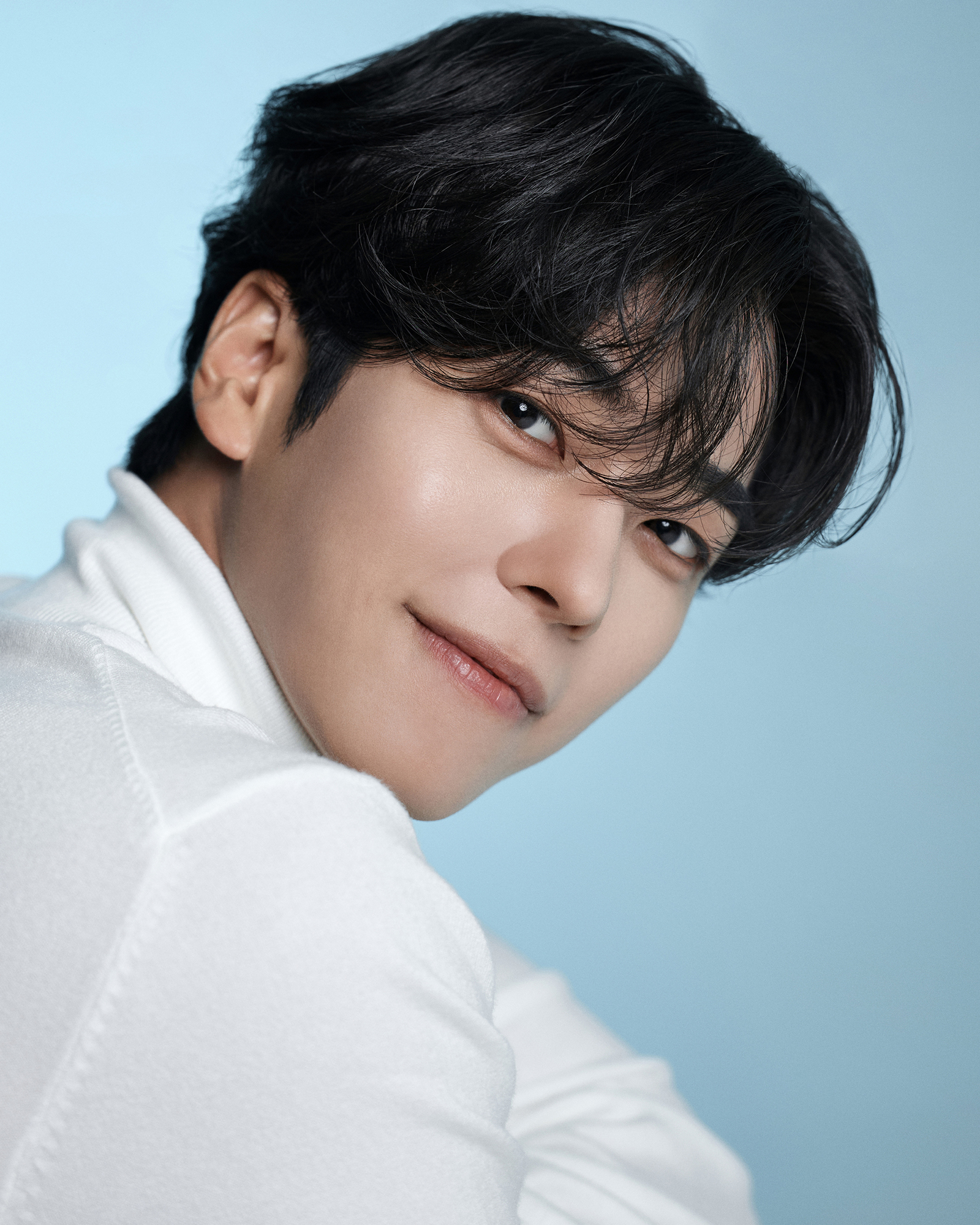
- Moon in 2024
- Born: Moon Ji-hoo; April 29, 1991 (age 35); South Korea
- Other name: Mun Ji-hu
- Occupations: Actor; singer; model
- Years active: 2012–present
- Agent: HB Entertainment
- Known for: Hello Dracula; Jugglers; Touch Your Heart

Korean name
- Hangul: 문지후
- RR: Mun Jihu
- MR: Mun Chihu

Moon Ji-hoo (born April 29, 1991) is a South Korean actor, singer and model. He is best known for his main role in I Have Three Boyfriends. He is a former member of the boy group A-Jax.

== Filmography ==
=== Television series ===
Year	Title	Role	Ref.
2014	Vampire Flower	Akan	
2017	Marriage, Not Dating	Sin-woo	
2017	Jugglers	Min Deul-re	
2018	Does Love Become Alive?	Chi-yeol	
2019	Touch Your Heart	Jeong-do	
2019	I Have Three Boyfriends	Ji-hoo	
2020	Hello Dracula	Choi Seon-saeng	
2020	Single & Ready to Mingle	Ma Ho-young	
2020	Lululala Pawn Shop	Min-ho	
2020	The Spies Who Loved Me	Doo Bong's underling	
2020	Homemade Love Story	Lee Jung-woo	
2021	Part-time Mello	Ma Hoon	
2022	Kissable Lips	Kwon Hae-soo	
2023–2024	The Third Marriage	Baek Sang-chul	
2023	My Man Is Cupid	Chun Dong-chil	
2024	Snow White's Revenge	Kang Eun-jae	

=== Film ===
Year	Title	Role	Ref.
2018	Bully	Tae-poong	
2020	The Therapist: Fist of Tae-baek	Celebrity	
2022	Singer Song	Si-jun	
2022	Kissable Lips	Kwon Hae-soo	

=== Web series ===
Year	Title	Role	Ref.
2022	Salty Idol	Eun-hyeon	

== Awards and nominations ==
Name of the award ceremony, year presented, category, nominee of the award, and the result of the nomination
Award ceremony	Year	Category	Result	Nominee / Work	Ref.
MBC Drama Awards	2024	Excellence Award, Actor in a Daily/Short Drama	Won	The Third Marriage	
