= Yadang: The Snitch =

2025 South Korean crime film by Hwang Byeong-gug

- Theatrical release poster
- Hangul: 야당
- RR: Yadang
- MR: Yadang
- Directed by: Hwang Byeong-gug
- Written by: Kim Hyo-seok
- Produced by: Kim Won-guk
- Starring: Kang Ha-neul; Yoo Hae-jin; Park Hae-joon; Ryu Kyung-soo; Chae Won-bin
- Cinematography: Lee Mo-gae
- Edited by: Kim Ha-na; Kim Woo-hyun
- Music by: Kim Hong-jip; Lee Jin-hee
- Production company: Hive Media Corp
- Distributed by: Megabox Plus M
- Release date: April 16, 2025
- Running time: 122 minutes
- Country: South Korea
- Language: Korean
- Budget: $9.5 million
- Box office: $24.5 million

Yadang: The Snitch (Korean: 야당) is a 2025 South Korean crime film directed by Hwang Byeong-gug. The film follows broker Lee Kang-soo (Kang Ha-neul), ambitious prosecutor Koo Gwan-hee (Yoo Hae-jin), and relentless narcotics detective Oh Sang-jae (Park Hae-joon) as their clashing motives intertwine in a high-stakes drug investigation. The cast also includes Ryu Kyung-soo and Chae Won-bin.

The film was released in South Korea on April 16, 2025 by Plus M Entertainment. It grossed $24.5 million worldwide on a $9.5 million budget, becoming the second-highest-grossing South Korean film of 2025.

== Plot ==
Lee Kang-soo profits by providing drug intel to the prosecution, while his partner, ambitious prosecutor Goo Gwan-hee, gains career success from these arrests. Kang-soo was a young man who supported his mother while working as a designated driver. His life changes when he is tricked by a customer into consuming a drug-laced drink and unjustly jailed. Goo recognizes his sharp memory and recruits him to befriend the imprisoned head of a drug trafficking ring, and successfully gathers intelligence on the organization through him. Their partnership flourishes, and Kang-soo becomes a yadang (an informant or undercover operative), while Goo rises through the prosecutorial ranks.

Meanwhile, narcotics officer Oh Sang-jae arrests actress Um Soo-jin for drug use, only to find his investigation undermined by Kang-soo and Goo, who swoop in to seize major busts, including one involving a presidential candidate's son, Cho Hoon. When Cho's powerful allies offer Goo advancement, he betrays Kang-soo, crippling him in a staged overdose attack. At the same time, Goo frames Sang-jae and Soo-jin to erase evidence of the drug party and protect Cho. Kang-soo survives, barely escaping with his life, while Sang-jae spends months clearing his name. Eventually, Kang-soo, Sang-jae, and Soo-jin realize they share a common enemy and form a pact for revenge.

The trio targets different figures: Kang-soo aims for Goo, Sang-jae for dealer Yeom Tae-soo, and Soo-jin for Cho Hoon. At first, Kang-soo and Sang-jae successfully subdue Yeom Tae-soo and obtain incriminating evidence, while Soo-jin films a drug party hosted by Cho. However, Detective Park, who took over as team leader among Sang-jae's subordinates, turns out to be a spy for Goo and tips off Cho. A car crash orchestrated by Cho's men kills Soo-jin and Kang-soo's close acquaintance Chang-rak, devastating Kang-soo. Though tempted to give up and leave Korea, Sang-jae convinces him to stay the course.

Goo, seeking to secure Cho's father's political future, orchestrates a scheme to fake drug-test results and protect Cho. However, Kang-soo anticipates Goo's ploy. He secretly records incriminating conversations by swapping Goo's lighter with a hidden recorder and live-streams them to the public during the presidential debate. Simultaneously, Goo's hitmen sent to kill Kang-soo are murdered by rival gangs. Goo realizes too late that he has been completely outmaneuvered. Furious, he confronts Kang-soo but is easily defeated. Cho's father withdraws from the election, Cho spirals into madness and jumped to his death, and Goo is arrested.

== Cast ==
- Kang Ha-neul as Lee Kang-soo
- Yoo Hae-jin as Goo Gwan-hee
- Park Hae-joon as Oh Sang-jae
- Ryu Kyung-soo as Cho Hoon
- Chae Won-bin as Uhm Soo-jin
- Yoo Seong-ju as Yeom Tae-soo
- Kim Geum-soon as Kim Hak-nam
- Lim Sung-kyun as Chang-rak
- Cho Wan-ki as Chief Oh
- Kwak Ja-hyoung as Detective Park
- Lee Seo-hwan as Kim

== Production ==
=== Development ===
According to director Hwang Byeong-gug, the idea for Yadang: The Snitch originated from a news article about the role of informants in drug investigations. Hwang conducted extensive field research, interviewing over 100 individuals including narcotics officers and former yadang (brokers), which helped shape the film's realism. During the research phase, Hwang was mistakenly detained by the police and underwent a drug test.

Art director Lee Mok-won, known for his work on Train to Busan (2016) and Along with the Gods series, conducted in-depth research to design sets that reflect both the physical world of narcotics investigations and the psychological shifts of the characters. Locations and set pieces were carefully crafted to mirror the internal states of the protagonists. The set design aimed not only to support the narrative but also to immerse viewers in a psychologically rich, genre-driven environment.

=== Casting ===
Hwang cast Park Hae-joon as narcotics detective Oh Sang-jae after previously working with Park during the filming of 12.12: The Day. Chae Won-bin was selected from over 100 candidates to play the role of Uhm Soo-jin, a disgraced former celebrity.

=== Filming ===
Principal photography for Yadang: The Snitch began on July 15, 2023 and ended on November.

== Marketing and release ==
In a collaboration between the film and law enforcement, Yadang: The Snitch partnered with the Gyeonggi Nambu Provincial Police Agency to launch a nationwide anti-drug campaign. Ahead of its theatrical release, audiences attending early screenings at major cinema chains will receive drug-testing kits and view anti-drug PSA messages before the film begins. Distributor Plus M Entertainment also engaged fans through a social media giveaway, offering limited-edition merchandise featuring police mascots. The campaign aims to raise public awareness of drug-related crimes, drawing on the film's gritty portrayal of Korea's narcotics underworld.

== Reception ==
=== Box office ===
The film was released on April 16, 2025, on 1,678 screens. It opened at first place at the South Korean box office with 85,657 admissions.

As of May 12, 2025, the film has grossed over US$23 million with 3 million admissions.

=== Critical response ===
Yadang: The Snitch has received strong audience acclaim, becoming the highest-grossing R-rated South Korean film since the COVID-19 pandemic. Critics point to the film's sharp social commentary on prosecutorial corruption, delivered with a mix of catharsis and entertainment. Film critic Yang Kyung-mi noted that Yadang: The Snitch resonates deeply in a time of growing public distrust toward the prosecution, offering audiences both narrative satisfaction and emotional release through its revenge arc.

=== Accolades ===
Award	Date of ceremony	Category	Recipient(s)	Result	Ref.
Baeksang Arts Awards	May 8, 2026	Best New Actress	Chae Won-bin	Nominated	
Buil Film Awards	September 18, 2025	Best Director	Hwang Byeong-gug	Won	
Buil Film Awards	September 18, 2025	Best Supporting Actress	Chae Won-bin	Nominated	
Korean Association of Film Critics Awards	November 6, 2025	Best Supporting Actress	Kim Geum-soon	Won	
