= Oh Se-young =

South Korean actress (born 1996)

- Born: 21 July 1996 (age 30); Seoul, South Korea
- Other name: Oh Si-young
- Education: Chung-Ang University
- Occupation: Actress
- Years active: 2015–present
- Agent: Billions
- Known for: Thirty-Nine; The Beauty Inside; VIP

Oh Se-young is a South Korean actress. She is known for her roles in dramas such as Thirty-Nine, Alice, The Beauty Inside and VIP. She also appeared in movies such as The Nightmare, Hundred Years Later, There's No One, Diary and The Day I Died: Unclosed Case.

== Filmography ==
=== Film ===
Year	Title	Role	Ref.
2015	Mama	Daughter	
2015	Seongjing	Si-ra	
2016	Twenty Year Old Song	Girl	
2017	The Call	Lee-Kyung	
2017	The Nightmare	Nightmare person	
2018	Diary	Se-young	
2018	Hundred Years Later, There's No One	Survivor	
2019	Yoo Yeol's Music Album	Singer	
2020	The Day I Died: Unclosed Case	Bakery shop clerk	

=== Television series ===
Year	Title	Role	Ref.
2018	The Beauty Inside	Joo Ga-young	
2019	VIP	Han So-mi	
2020	Alice	Si-young	
2022	Thirty-Nine	Jo Hye-jin	
2022	Blind	Baek Ji-eun	
2023–2024	The Third Marriage	Kang Se-ran	
2024	Lovely Runner	Choi Ga-Young	
2025	The Judge Returns	Yoo Se-hee	
2026	What a Boss Wants	Lee Eun-chae	

=== Web series ===
Year	Title	Role	Ref.
2018	Taste of Cat	Han Ye	
2018	Your Imagination Becomes Reality	So Ram	
2019	Dating Class	Cha Joo-won	
2019	Cat's Bar	Park Ha-na	
2022	My Rocket Ship	Kim Jae-hee	

== Theatre ==
Year	Title	Korean Title	Role	Ref.
2017	Kyung Seong Jiae	경성지애	Ji-ah	
2017	Trials	시련	Lady	
2018	Homecoming	년 집으로	Tanka	

== Awards and nominations ==
Name of the award ceremony, year presented, category, nominee of the award, and the result of the nomination
Award ceremony	Year	Category	Result	Nominee / Work	Ref.
MBC Drama Awards	2024	Excellence Award, Actress in a Daily/Short Drama	Won	The Third Marriage	
