= Chae Won-bin =

South Korean actress (born 2001)

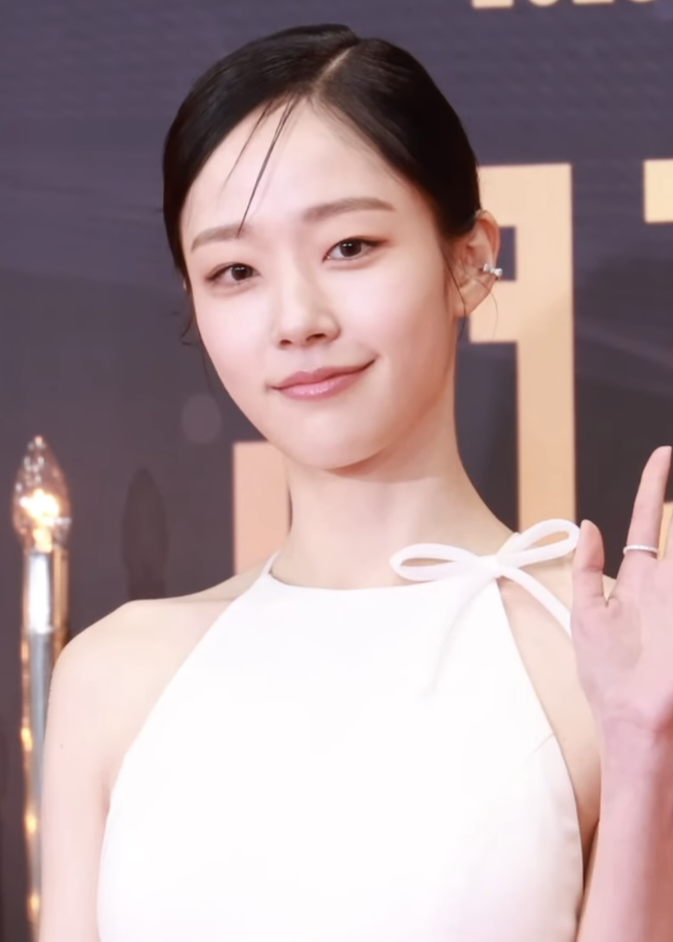
- Chae in December 2023
- Born: April 5, 2001 (age 25); South Korea
- Education: Sungshin Women's University – Department of Media, Film and Acting
- Occupation: Actress
- Years active: 2019–present
- Agent: Outer Universe

Korean name
- Hangul: 채원빈
- RR: Chae Wonbin
- MR: Ch'ae Wŏnbin

Chae Won-bin (Korean: 채원빈; born April 5, 2001) is a South Korean actress known for her role in the television series Doubt (2024), which earned her multiple Best New Actress nods including Baeksang Arts Award, and the crime film Yadang: The Snitch (2025).

== Early life ==
Chae was born on April 5, 2001, in South Korea. She is currently enrolled in the Department of Media, Film and Acting at the Sungshin Women's University.

== Career ==
Chae made her debut in December 2019 with Naver TV's web series The Secret of Secret, portraying the lead role of Shin Yeon-joo.

Chae has also appeared in commercials for SK Telecom, Samsung Electronics, LG U+, Canon Korea, and more.

In April 2020, Chae made her television debut in tvN's When My Love Blooms, portraying the supporting role of Yoon Ji-young. A month later, she made her film debut in Run Boy Run, playing the supporting role of Eun-ha. In August 2020, she starred in JTBC's television series Twenty-Twenty, playing the lead role of Baek Ye-eun. In October 2020, she starred in SBS's television series Delayed Justice, portraying the cameo role of Jung Myung-hee. A month later, she starred in Lifetime Korea's television series The Mermaid Prince: The Beginning, playing the lead role of Jo Ah-ra.

In June 2021, Chae starred in season four of tvN's television series Voice, playing the cameo role of Kong Su-ji. In November 2021, she starred in tvN's television series Secret Royal Inspector & Joy, portraying the supporting role of Hwang Bo-ri and Bi-ryung.

In August 2023, Chae starred in KBS's television series My Lovely Boxer, portraying the supporting role of Han Ah-reum. In November 2023, she starred in KBS's television series Drama Special – "Love Attack", playing the lead role of Kang Kyung-joo, for which she won the Best Actress in Drama Special/TV Cinema at the 2023 KBS Drama Awards. In December 2023, she starred in the second season of Netflix's web series Sweet Home, portraying the supporting role of Ha-ni.

In July 2024, Chae reprise her supporting role of Ha-ni in the third season of Netflix's web series Sweet Home. In October 2024, she starred in MBC's television series Doubt, playing the lead role of Jang Ha-bin.

In June 2026, it was announced that Chae will be joining the cast of the second season of Disney+ action fantasy sci-fi television series Moving.

== Filmography ==
=== Film ===
Key
†	Denotes films that have not yet been released

Film appearances
Year	Title	Role	Notes	Ref.
2020	Run Boy Run	Eun-ha	Independent film	
2022	The Witch: Part 2. The Other One	Tou girl 1		
2023	Strong Underdog	Min-ah		
2025	Yadang: The Snitch	Uhm Soo-jin		
2026	Judge Girl	Min-ah		

=== Television series ===
Key
†	Denotes television productions that have not yet been released

Television series appearances
Year	Title	Role	Notes	Ref.
2020	When My Love Blooms	Yoon Ji-young		
2020	Twenty-Twenty	Baek Ye-eun		
2020	Delayed Justice	Jung Myung-hee	Cameo (Episode 2–3, 14)	
2020	The Mermaid Prince: The Beginning	Jo Ah-ra		
2021	Voice	Kong Su-ji	Season 4; Cameo (Episode 3–5, 7–8)	
2021	Secret Royal Inspector & Joy	Hwang Bo-ri / Bi-ryung		
2023	My Lovely Boxer	Han Ah-reum		
2023	KBS Drama Special – "Love Attack"	Kang Kyung-joo	Season 14; Episode 7	
2023–2024	Sweet Home	Ha-ni	Season 2–3	
2024	Doubt	Jang Ha-bin		
2024	Who Is She	Choi Ha-na		
2026	Sold Out on You	Dam Ye-jin		
2027	Moving		Season 2	

=== Web series ===
Web series appearances
Year	Title	Role	Notes	Ref.
2019	The Secret of Secret	Shin Yeon-joo		

== Awards and nominations ==
Name of the award ceremony, year presented, category, nominee of the award, and the result of the nomination
Award ceremony	Year	Category	Nominee / Work	Result	Ref.
Baeksang Arts Awards	2025	Best New Actress – Television	Doubt	Won	
Baeksang Arts Awards	2026	Best New Actress – Film	Yadang: The Snitch	Nominated	
Buil Film Awards	2025	Best Supporting Actress	Yadang: The Snitch	Nominated	
Cine21 Film Awards	2024	New Actress of the Year (Series)	Doubt	Won	
Grimae Awards	2024	Best Actress	Doubt	Won	
MBC Drama Awards	2024	Best New Actress	Doubt	Won	
APAN Star Awards	2024	Best New Actress	Doubt	Won	
KBS Drama Awards	2023	Best Actress in Drama Special/TV Cinema	KBS Drama Special – "Love Attack"	Won	
KBS Drama Awards	2023	Best New Actress	My Lovely Boxer; KBS Drama Special – "Love Attack"	Nominated	
KBS Drama Awards	2023	Popularity Award, Actress	Chae Won-bin	Nominated	
