= Amanza =

2020 South Korean web series

- Promotional poster
- Hangul: 아만자
- RR: Amanja
- MR: Amanja
- Genre: Drama; Fantasy
- Based on: Amanza by Kim Bo-tong
- Developed by: Kakao M
- Screenplay by: Kim Dong-ha; Kwak Jae-min
- Directed by: Kim Dong-ha (live-action); Han Ji-won (animation)
- Starring: Ji Soo; Lee Seol; Oh Hyun-kyung; Yoo Seung-mok; Lee Jong-won
- No. of episodes: 10

Production
- Executive producer: Lee Young-seok
- Running time: 15–19 minutes
- Production companies: Lezhin Studio; Production KEZR

Original release
- Network: KakaoTV
- Release: September 1 – November 3, 2020

Amanza (Korean: 아만자) is a South Korean web series starring Ji Soo, Lee Seol, Oh Hyun-kyung, Yoo Seung-mok and Lee Jong-won. Based on the Lezhin webtoon of the same name by Kim Bo-tong, it was released through KakaoTV from September 1 to November 3, 2020.

== Synopsis ==
When 27-year-old Park Dong-myung is diagnosed with terminal cancer, he starts going back and forth between reality and the dream world where an exciting adventure unfolds during which he learns the meaning of life.

== Cast ==
=== Main ===
- Ji Soo as Park Dong-myung / Amanza
- Lee Seol as Min-jung
- Oh Hyun-kyung as Mum
- Yoo Seung-mok as Dong Myung's father
- Lee Jong-won as Park Dong-yeon

=== Supporting ===
- Kang On as Kim Kang-on
- Shin Joo-hwan as Tae-hwan
- Choi Byung-yoon as Yong-min
- Park Hyung-soo as Hyung-joo
- Park Se-joon as Chul-gyu
- Kim Ye-eun as Ji-sun

== Episodes ==
No.	Title	Original release date
1	"I Suddenly Became a Cancer Patient Today"; Transliteration: "Naneun oneul gabjagi am hwanjaga doeeossda" (Korean: 나는 오늘 갑자기 암 환자가 되었다)	September 1, 2020
2	"A New Adventure Began with the First Chemotherapy"; Transliteration: "Cheos hang-amchilyowa hamkke saeloun moheom-i sijagdoeeossda" (Korean: 첫 항암치료와 함께 새로운 모험이 시작되었다)	September 8, 2020
3	"A 27-Year-Old Cancer Patient's Birthday Party and His Father's Heart"; Transliteration: "27sal amhwanjaui saeng-il pati, geuligo abeojiui ma-eum" (Korean: 27살 암환자의 생일 파티, 그리고 아버지의 마음)	September 15, 2020
4	"My Hair Keeps Falling Out"; Transliteration: "Jakku meolikalag-i ppajinda" (Korean: 자꾸 머리카락이 빠진다)	September 22, 2020
5	"I'll Be the Only One Left"; Transliteration: "Gyeolgug naman namge doegessjiman" (Korean: 결국 나만 남게 되겠지만)	September 29, 2020
6	"Mom, I Want to Go Home"; Transliteration: "Eomma, na jib-e gago sip-eo" (Korean: 엄마, 나 집에 가고 싶어)	October 6, 2020
7	"I Still Have a Lot of Things I Want to Do, Places I Want to Go"; Transliteration: "Ajig hago sip-eun geosdo, gago sip-eun gosdo manh-eunde" (Korean: 아직 하고 싶은 것도, 가고 싶은 곳도 많은데)	October 13, 2020
8	"Why Do I Have to Die?"; Transliteration: "Na wae jug-eoya hae?" (Korean: 나 왜 죽어야 해?)	October 20, 2020
9	"There Is No Life Without Regrets, But There Is No Life Without Meaning"; Transliteration: "Huhoe eobsneun salm-eun eobsjiman, uimi eobsneun salmdo eobsda" (Korean: 후회 없는 삶은 없지만, 의미 없는 삶도 없다)	October 27, 2020
10	"Amanza's Special Adventure"; Transliteration: "Amanjaui teugbyeolhan moheom" (Korean: 아만자의 특별한 모험)	November 3, 2020

== Production ==
The first script reading took place in the summer of 2020.

== Original soundtrack ==
=== Part 1 ===
Released on October 6, 2020
No.	Title	Lyrics	Music	Artist	Length
1.	"Memory"	Sunwoo Jung-a; Jo Sung-tae	Jo Sung-tae	Hoseung	4:21

=== Part 2 ===
Released on October 13, 2020
No.	Title	Lyrics	Music	Artist	Length
1.	"Running Time"	Sunwoo Jung-a	Sunwoo Jung-a	Elaine	4:17
2.	"Running Time" (Inst.)		Sunwoo Jung-a		4:17
Total length:					8:34
