= 2024 Grimae Awards =

2024 South Korean television awards ceremony

- Native name: 2024 그리메상 시상식
- Awarded for: Best in Drama, Documentary, TV Commercial and Variety Show
- Date: December 11, 2024
- Site: M Lounge of the MBC building in Mapo-gu, Seoul
- Country: South Korea
- First award: 1993

Highlights
- Most wins: Doubt

The 2024 Grime Awards ceremony, organised by the Korea Directors of Photography Society (KDPS) and sponsored by Panasonic, held at the M Lounge of the MBC building in Mapo-gu, Seoul on December 11, 2024.

The 'Grimae Award' is an award established by the Korean Association of Cinematographers in 1993. It is presented to works that demonstrate the most outstanding visual aesthetics and creativity during the year. The winner was decided through a vote by cinematographers.

== Winners ==
2024 Grimae Awards Winners
Award Category	Genre	Winner(s)	Affiliation	Work Title
Grand Prize (Daesang)	Documentary	Seung Se-ri, Jeong Yeon-jin, Park Jun-su, Kim Seung-woo	KBS	KBS Public Broadcast Documentary, 3-Part Series
Best Picture	Drama	Lee Jin-seok, Lee Duk-sun	MBC	Doubt
Best Picture	Show/Music	SBS A&T Production Team	SBS	2024 SBS Gayo Daejeon Summer
Excellence Award	Studio/Video	Ma Sang-yeop	MBC	The PD Disappeared
Excellence Award	Drama	Kim Seong-ban, Jung Soon-dong	MBC	Flowers Bloom in the Stars
Excellence Award	Documentary	Kim Seung-min	EBS	Documentary K: We Are the Chosen People, Part 1: The Nation for the People
Excellence Award	Regional	Jeon Jin-wook	TBC	Hello, Tony
Excellence Award	Show/Music	Kim Sang-hun	MBC	2024 Show! Music Core in JAPAN
Regional Award	Regional	Lee Gwang-hoon, Son Cheol-yong	Regional Broadcasters / CJB Cheongju	Regional Joint Production, 4K Documentary: Sand Date in Asia
New Cinematographer	Documentary	Choi Ji-won	Wonju MBC	I Know the Blue Bird of Happiness
Best Director	Drama	Seung Hyun-ho	MBC	Doubt
Best Editor	Drama	Kim Hee-seong, Lee Ji-hye	MBC	Doubt
Best Actor (Male)	Promo/Other	Han Seok-gyu	—	Doubt
Best Actor (Female)	Promo/Other	Chae Bin	—	Doubt
Special Award	—	Han Sang-jin	Billiance	Korea Content Agency 2024 Content Growth Support Project, Project <Vivo> Directing
Achievement Award	—	Kim Gwang-jip	Seoul Institute of the Arts	Korea Content Agency 2024 Content Growth Support Project, Contribution to Public Welfare
Achievement Award	—	Ha Wook-gyeom	Daemoday	Contribution to the Korea Directors of Photography Society's Education Support
