= Jo Bok-rae =

South Korean actor (born 1986)

- Born: July 18, 1986 (age 40); Busan, South Korea
- Occupation: Actor
- Years active: 2010–present
- Children: 2

Jo Bok-rae (Korean: 조복래; born July 18, 1986) is a South Korean actor.

== Education ==
He graduated from Hyehwa High School and studied in the Department of Theater at Seoul Institute of the Arts.

== Career ==
Jo Bok-rae debuted in the 2010 play My Love DMZ and made his first film appearance in the 2013 movie Hope in a minor role.

In July 2026, after 8 years, Jo left BH Entertainment.

== Filmography ==
=== Film ===
Key
†	Denotes films that have not yet been released

Year	Title	Role	Notes	Ref.
2013	Hope	Coco Mong Part-timer 2		
2014	One Night Only	Yong-woo		
2014	Monster	Rural Policeman		
2014	High Heel	Man 2		
2014	The Admiral: Roaring Currents	Oh Sang-goo		
2014	We Are Brothers	Pickpocket Brother		
2015	C'est Si Bon	Song Chang-sik		
2015	Coin Locker Girl	Tak		
2015	Minority Opinion	Prosecutor of Jo Goo-hwan		
2015	The Accidental Detective	Lee Yoo-no		
2015	Love Guide for Dumpees	Deok-rae		
2016	The Queen of Crime	Gae-tae		
2016	Hide-and-Never Seek	PD Park		
2017	Eun-ha	Jung Tae-ha		
2018	The Princess and the Matchmaker	Lee Gae-shi		
2018	Fengshui	Bbeokkooki		
2018	Door Lock	Kim Ki-jung		
2019	Stranger than Jesus	Jesus		
2019	Unknown Waltz	Jay	Short film	
2020	Josée	Chul-ho		
2020	Untact	Hae-young		
2021	The One You Were Looking for	Joon-beom	Short film	
2026	Judge Girl	Seong-gil	Special appearance	

=== Television series ===
Key
†	Denotes television productions that have not yet been released

Year	Title	Role	Notes	Ref.
2015	Yong-pal	Park Tae-yong		
2016	The Vampire Detective	Kang Tae-woo		
2016	Entertainer	Jo Sung-hyun		
2019	Different Dreams	Kim Nam-ok		
2019	Chief of Staff 2	Yang Jong-yeol		
2020	Kingmaker: The Change of Destiny	Yong Pal-ryong		
2021	River Where the Moon Rises			
2021	Navillera	Sung-kwan		
2021	On the Verge of Insanity	Han Seung-gi		
2021	The Veil	Kim Dong-wook		
2021	Hometown	Lee Si-jung		
2021	Our Beloved Summer	Park Dong-il		
2022	The Law Cafe	Mr. Jo		
2022	Connect	Mr. Kim		
2023	Agency	Kang Han-soo		
2023	Miraculous Brothers	Jung Yong-dae		
2023	Moving	Park Chan-il		
2023	The Story of Park's Marriage Contract	Hong Sung-pyo		
2024	Iron Family	Nam Ki-doong		
2025	Undercover High School	Go Young-hoon		
2026	The Practical Guide to Love	Lee Eun-ho		
2026	Sold Out on You	Park Gwang-mo		
2026	Agent Kim Reactivated	Jung-dae / Gold Tooth		
2026–2027	Nine to Six †	Jung Gi-tae		

== Theater ==
- Clumsy People – Jang Deok-bae
- Return to Hamlet – Do-shik
- The Tempest
- Let's Play, Bukcheong Lion
- Hahoe Village
- Chunpung's Wife + Dressing Room
- Romeo and Juliet
- My Love DMZ

== Musical ==
- That Summer, Zoo – That Friend
- December – Ensemble
- Father's Song

== Discography ==
- C'est Si Bon OST (2015)
- Entertainer OST Part 8 (2016)

== Awards and nominations ==
- 2015 – 51st Baeksang Arts Awards, Best New Actor (Film) for C'est Si Bon – Nominated
