= Roh Jae-won =

South Korean actor (born 1993)

- 노재원
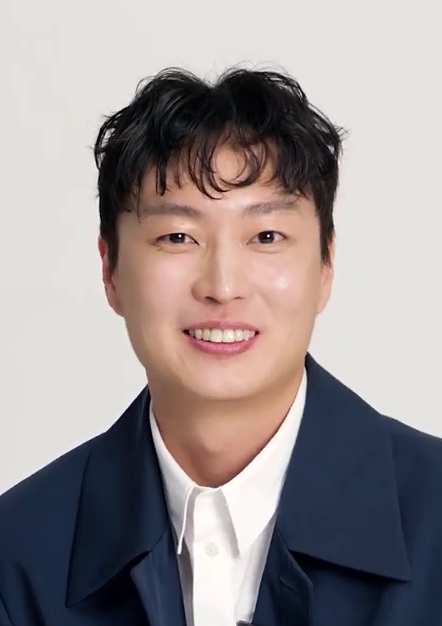
- Roh in 2024
- Born: 13 October 1993 (age 33); Yeongam County, South Korea
- Occupation: Actor
- Years active: 2020–present
- Agent: Noon Company

Korean name
- Hangul: 노재원
- RR: No Jaewon
- MR: No Chaewŏn
- Website: nooncompany.kr/artists_profile.php?artist=21

Roh Jae-won (Korean: 노재원; born 13 October 1993) is a South Korean actor who is best known for his performance as Nam-gyu in Squid Game (2024–2025). He previously starred in the series Daily Dose of Sunshine (2023) and Doubt (2024).

== Career ==
Roh made his debut in 2020 with his appearance in the short film Driving School (드라이빙 스쿨).

In November 2023, Roh acted the part of a patient with delusional disorder named Kim Seo-wan in the series Daily Dose of Sunshine. Roh realistically portrayed the difficulty navigating the blurred boundaries between reality and dreams and was praised for his in-depth emotional expression.

In October 2024, Roh starred in the television series Doubt (2024) as a police officer in the criminal behavior analysis team alongside actor Han Suk-kyu.

In December 2024, Roh starred as Nam-gyu with a contestant number 124 in the second season of the series Squid Game and received recognition both domestically and internationally for his performance in the series. In June 2025, Roh also appeared in the third season of the series.

== Filmography ==
=== Film ===
Key
†	Denotes films that have not yet been released

Year	Title	Role	Ref.
2022	Missing Yoon	Jeong Joon-ok	
2022	Ditto	Joo Geun-tae	
2024	Ms. Apocalypse	Koo Do-young	
2024	A Normal Family	Doctor	
2026	Tazza: The Song of Beelzebub	Park Tae-young	

=== Television series ===
Key
†	Denotes television productions that have not yet been released

Year	Title	Role	Notes	Ref.
2022	Once Upon a Small Town	Yoon Geun-mo		
2023	D.P.	Choi Hyun-do	Season 2	
2023	Daily Dose of Sunshine	Kim Seo-wan		
2024	A Killer Paradox	Ha Sang-min		
2024	Uncle Samsik	Han-soo		
2024	Doubt	Koo Dae-hong		
2024–2025	Squid Game	Nam-gyu (Player 124)	Season 2–3	
2025	Nine Puzzles	Hwang In-chan		
2025–2026	Made in Korea	Pyo Hak-soo		
2026	Can This Love Be Translated?	Kim Yu-jin	Cameo (episode 11)	
2026	If Wishes Could Kill	Bang-ul		
TBA	All of Us Are Dead †	Han Du-seok	Season 2	

=== Web series ===
Year	Title	Role	Notes	Ref.
2020	XX	Kang Min-ki		

== Awards and nominations ==
Name of the award ceremony, year presented, category, nominee of the award, and the result of the nomination
Award ceremony	Year	Category	Nominee / Work	Result	Ref.
APAN Star Awards	2024	Best New Actor	Doubt, Daily Dose of Sunshine	Won	
Baeksang Arts Awards	2025	Best Supporting Actor – Television	Squid Game 2	Nominated	
Blue Dragon Series Awards	2024	Best New Actor	Daily Dose of Sunshine	Nominated	
Cine21 Film Awards	2021	Best New Actor	Missing Yoon	Won	
MBC Drama Awards	2024	Best New Actor	Doubt	Nominated	
