= What a Boss Wants =

2026 South Korean television series

- Promotional poster
- Hangul: 보스의 노골적 취향
- Lit.: Boss's Blatant Taste
- RR: Boseuui nogoljeok chwihyang
- MR: Posŭŭi nogoljŏk ch'wihyang
- Genre: Romance drama
- Based on: Boss's Blatant Taste by Sikeukeu
- Written by: Nam Ji-yeon
- Directed by: Kang Sol
- Starring: Sung Hoon; Oh Se-young
- Country of origin: South Korea
- Original language: Korean
- No. of episodes: 4

Production
- Production companies: Godin Media; Artist Studio

Original release
- Network: MBN
- Release: November 11, 2026 – present

What a Boss Wants (Korean: 보스의 노골적 취향) is an ongoing South Korean romance drama television series based on the web novel of the same name by Sikeukeu. Written by Nam Ji-yeon and directed by Kang Sol, the series follows Kwon Do-hyuk (Sung Hoon), a chaebol CEO in the entertainment industry, and Lee Eun-chae (Oh Se-young), an indie rock band vocalist. It premiered on MBN on November 11, 2026, and airs every Wednesday and Thursday at 22:20 (KST). It is also available for streaming on Viki in selected regions.

== Premise ==
Kwon Do-hyuk, a chaebol boss, sets out to find the mysterious woman known as "Her" featured on an album cover. His search leads him to Lee Eun-chae, an indie band vocalist leading a secret double life who becomes the sole unpredictable variable in his otherwise ordered world, drawing the two into a fake romance.

== Cast and characters ==
=== Main ===
- Sung Hoon as Kwon Do-hyuk

CEO of Oyes Entertainment and a genius in the AI field.

- Oh Se-young as Lee Eun-chae

A job seeker by day and performs as 'Su', the vocalist of an indie band, India Red, by night.

- Lee Jung-shin as Moon Tae-kyung

A pediatrician at Seheon Hospital and a medical school classmate of Eun-chae's brother-in-law.

=== Supporting ===
==== Eun-chae's family ====
- Jo Hee-bong as Lee Man-deok

Eun-chae and Eun-seo's father.

- Lee Choong-joo as Seo Jin-woo

Eun-chae's brother-in-law and a psychiatry specialist.

- Kim Jae-in as Lee Eun-seo

Eun-chae's older sister and a criminal psychologist.

==== Do-hyuk's family ====
- Park Jung-hak as Kwon Tae-woong

Do-hyuk's father and chairman of Seheon Group.

- Kim Yoon-kyung as Jung Mi-seon

Do-hyuk's stepmother.

- Kim Seung-hee as Kwon Do-yeon

Do-hyuk's half-sister.

==== Oyes Entertainment ====
- Lee Do-yeop as Park Joon-sang

Chairman Kwon's chief of staff and Do-hyuk's secretary.

- Kim Ki-bang as Lee Young-guk

Director of Oyes Entertainment. He sides with Mi-seon, the largest shareholder and a member of Seheon Group, keeping Do-hyuk in check and reporting everything to Mi-seon.

- Oh Seung-ah as Oh Shin-hye

Executive producer at Oyes Entertainment.

==== India Red band ====
- Yu Shin as Kim Dong-woo

The bassist of India Red and Eun-chae's same-age best friend.

- Kim Nu-rim as Park Ho-ya

The popular guitarist and youngest member of the indie band India Red, who becomes entangled with Do-hyuk's half-sister, Do-yeon.

- Park Jae-hyun as Ryu / Stephen Liu

The quiet and calm drummer of India Red who is an avid fan of makjang dramas.

== Production ==
=== Development ===
What a Boss Wants is a romance drama based on the web novel of the same name (also known as Boss's Blatant Taste) by Sikeukeu / Chicc. It is directed by Kang Sol, who helmed My Lovely Journey (2025), written by Nam Ji-yeon, who wrote Bitter Sweet Hell (2024), and produced jointly by Godin Media and Artist Studio.

=== Casting ===
In July 2026, Sung Hoon and Oh Se-young were offered the lead roles of Kwon Do-hyuk and Lee Eun-chae, respectively. The next month, both actors' appearances were confirmed. The same month, Lee Jung-shin was confirmed to appear. In October 2026, Kim Nu-rim, Yu Shin, and Park Jae-hyun were confirmed to join the cast as the members of the indie band India Red, while Kim Seung-hee was also revealed to portray Kwon Do-hyuk's half-sister.

== Release ==
What a Boss Wants was reportedly set to air in the second half of 2026. The series premiered on MBN on November 11, 2026, and airs every Wednesday and Thursday at 22:20 (KST). It is also available for streaming on Viki in selected regions.

== Viewership ==
What a Boss Wants : South Korea viewers per episode (thousands)

Season	Episode number											
Season	1	2	3	4	5	6	7	8	9	10	11	12
1	321	229	N/A	208	TBD	TBD	TBD	TBD	TBD	TBD	TBD	TBD

Source: Audience measurement performed nationwide by Nielsen Korea.

Average TV viewership ratings (nationwide)
Ep.	Original broadcast date	Average audience share (Nielsen Korea)	
Ep.	Original broadcast date	Nationwide	Seoul
1	November 11, 2026	1.3% (16th)	0.9% (19th)
2	November 12, 2026	1.0% (19th)	0.7% (19th)
3	November 18, 2026	0.9% (21st)	N/A
4	November 19, 2026	1.0% (20th)	0.7% (19th)
5	November 25, 2026		
6	November 26, 2026		
7	December 2, 2026		
8	December 3, 2026		
9	December 9, 2026		
10	December 10, 2026		
11	December 16, 2026		
12	December 17, 2026		
Average		—	—
In the table above, the blue numbers represent the lowest ratings and the red numbers represent the highest ratings.; This drama airs on a cable channel/pay TV which normally has a relatively smaller audience compared to free-to-air TV/public broadcasters (KBS, SBS, MBC, and EBS).
