= Judge Girl =

2026 South Korean action comedy film

- Main poster
- Hangul: 소녀심판
- RR: Sonyeosimpan
- MR: Sonyŏsimp'an
- Directed by: Ryu Kwang-hyun
- Screenplay by: Ryu Kwang-hyun
- Produced by: Kim Seok-mok
- Starring: Chae Won-bin; Kang Hee-gu; Yoo Hyun-soo; Han Sun-hwa; Hwang Ji-ah; Jo Bok-rae; Shin Ji-seop; Choi Jun-young
- Production companies: Studio Surl; Film Company Bae
- Distributed by: Laon Company Plus
- Release date: April 1, 2026
- Running time: 90 minutes
- Country: South Korea
- Language: Korean

Judge Girl (Korean: 소녀심판) is a 2026 South Korean action comedy film written and directed by Ryu Kwang-hyun. It stars Chae Won-bin, Kang Hee-gu, and Yoo Hyun-soo. Set in a high school, the film follows Min-ah, a legendary former fighter trying to live a quiet life as an ordinary student, who becomes a mysterious tracksuit-clad girl to protect her classmates Min-ki and Kwang-sik by confronting school bullies. The film was released on April 1, 2026, through Internet Protocol television (IPTV) and video on demand (VOD) platforms.

== Plot ==
Min-ah, a strong-willed high school girl with a deep sense of justice and exceptional fighting skills, lost her parents in an accident at a young age and was raised by her aunt. Determined to leave her violent past behind, she enters high school hoping for a normal life. However, on her first day, she becomes drawn to her handsome and seemingly righteous classmate, Min-ki.

When Min-ki is targeted by Se-hyeok, the leader of a delinquent clique, Min-ah cannot ignore the bullying. Disguising herself in a tracksuit and concealing her face, she steps in to rescue him. The incident causes a stir throughout the school, with students searching for the mysterious “Tracksuit Guy,” while Min-ki begins investigating the identity of his unknown savior.

As tensions rise, Min-ah becomes entangled in a complicated rivalry involving Hye-ri and Se-hyeok, while struggling to keep her secret identity hidden. Balancing her strong sense of justice, her fiery temperament, and her growing feelings for Min-ki, Min-ah finds her attempts at living an ordinary life becoming increasingly difficult.

== Cast ==
- Chae Won-bin as Min-ah, a high school student and former fighter with a strong sense of justice, who intervenes to protect her peers while maintaining a secret identity.
- Kang Hee-gu as Min-ki, Min-ah's classmate and close friend; Min-ah develops a crush on him.
- Yoo Hyun-soo as Kwang-sik, another of Min-ah's friends, also targeted by bullies.
- Han Sun-hwa as Kim Jin-hee, Min-ah's former middle school homeroom teacher who once protected her and reunites with her in high school.
- Hwang Ji-ah as Mi-ri
- Jo Bok-rae as Seong-gil, a humorous Dean of students, responsible for overseeing student activities.
- Shin Ji-seop as Se-hyeok, the ruthless leader of the school's delinquent circle, who relentlessly targets his classmates.
- Choi Jun-young as Dong-geun
- Park Si-hyun as Hye-ri, a student involved in the love triangle with Min-ah and Min-ki.
- Jung Ji-yoon as Min-ah's aunt
- Park Sun-woo as Min-ah's father

== Production ==
=== Filming ===
Filming took place in South Korea, focusing on combining action sequences with school-life comedy to depict high school bullying, and was completed in 2022, four years prior to its official release.

=== Marketing ===
On March 16, 2026, the main poster and the release date were officially confirmed through media outlets, ahead of film's release in April 1, 2026.

=== Casting ===
Chae Won-bin stars in the lead role, with Kang Hee-gu and Yoo Hyun-soo in main roles. Han Sun-hwa and Jo Bok-rae appear in special appearances. Hwang Ji-ah, Shin Ji-seop, and Choi Jun-young are additional cast members, as listed on the official main poster.

== Release ==
=== Home media ===
Judge Girl was released on April 1, 2026, in South Korea through Internet Protocol television (IPTV) and video on demand (VOD) platforms, including KT Genie TV, SK Btv, LG U+, and Home Choice.
