= 2022 Grimae Awards =

2022 South Korean television awards ceremony

- Native name: 2022 그리메상 시상식
- Awarded for: Best in Drama, Documentary, TV Commercial and Variety Show
- Date: November 22, 2022
- Site: M Lounge of the MBC building in Mapo-gu, Seoul
- Country: South Korea
- First award: 1993

The 2022 Grime Awards ceremony was held at the M Lounge of the MBC building in Mapo-gu, Seoul on November 22, 2022.

The 'Grimae Award' is an award established by the Korea Directors of Photography Society (KDPS) in 1993. It is presented to works that demonstrate the most outstanding visual aesthetics and creativity during the year. The winner was decided through a vote by cinematographers.

== Winners ==
Winners is referenced by:

2022 Grimae Awards Winners
Award Category	Genre	Affiliation	Winner(s)	Work Title
Grand Prize (Daesang)	Culture/Documentary	EBS	Lim Hyung-eun	EBS DocuPrime: 100 Years of Women
Best Picture	Show/Music	SBS	Eom Hyuk, Oh Se-jang, Yoon Soon-hang, Yang Hyung-seok, Lee Cheol, Song In-seok, Jo Jin-hyun, Song Nak-hoon, Hwang In-wook, Kim Tae-jin, Kim Ji-hyun	2022 KPOP.FLEX in Frankfurt
Best Picture	Regional	KBS Daejeon	Hwang Jae-jun, Lee Ga-won	KBS Daejeon UHD Special: The Elderly and the Tidal Flat
Excellence Award	Drama	MBC	Kim Hwa-young, Kim Seong-han, Jung Soon-dong	The Red Sleeve
Excellence Award	Docu/Culture	SBS	Park Jong-gi, Park Chan-woong	SBS Special: Monkey City
Excellence Award	Show/Music	EBS	Ahn Jun-young	Space Gonggam - Unofficial Boy
Excellence Award	Studio/Video	EBS	EBS Studio Video Team	Your Literacy Plus
New Cinematographer	Docu/Culture	SBS	Yeom Han-rim	SBS Special: Bear Hand Cafe
New Cinematographer	Docu/Culture	EBS	Lee Won-seok	DocuPrime: Children's Rights, Part 3: The Time Called Childhood
New Cinematographer	Regional	KNN	Kwon Yong-guk	Memories of a Thousand Years, Season 1
Regional Category	Regional	KBS Jeju	Kim Deok-gon, Yang Ho-geun	Jeju 4.3 Special Human Documentary: Sukja
