= Doubt (South Korean TV series) =

2024 South Korean television series

- Promotional poster
- Hangul: 이토록 친밀한 배신자
- Hanja: 이토록 親密한 背信者
- Lit.: Such a Close Traitor
- RR: Itorok chinmilhan baesinja
- MR: It'orok ch'inmirhan paesinja
- Genre: Psychological thriller; Crime drama
- Written by: Han Ah-young
- Directed by: Song Yeon-hwa
- Starring: Han Suk-kyu; Chae Won-bin; Han Ye-ri; Roh Jae-won; Yoon Kyung-ho; Oh Yeon-soo
- Music by: Park Se-joon
- Country of origin: South Korea
- Original language: Korean
- No. of episodes: 10

Production
- Executive producers: Han Seung-il; Jeon Hye-joon; Kim Myung
- Producers: Kim Jae-bok; Kang Hak-gu
- Cinematography: Lee Jin-seok; Lee Deok-hoon; Lee Jong-hyun
- Editors: Kim Hee-sung; Lee Ji-hye
- Running time: 70 minutes
- Production companies: MBC; Ascendio; Woodside
- Budget: ₩9.6 billion

Original release
- Network: MBC TV
- Release: October 11 – November 15, 2024

Doubt (Korean: 이토록 친밀한 배신자) is a 2024 South Korean psychological thriller crime drama television series written by Han Ah-young, directed by Song Yeon-hwa, and starring Han Suk-kyu and Chae Won-bin along with Han Ye-ri, Roh Jae-won, Yoon Kyung-ho and Oh Yeon-soo. The series depicts the dilemma faced by South Korea's best profiler when he discovers his daughter's secret related to a murder crime. It aired on MBC TV every Friday and Saturday at 21:50 (KST) from October 11 to November 15, 2024. It is also available for streaming on Wavve and Coupang Play in South Korea, and on Netflix and Kocowa in selected regions.

== Synopsis ==
Criminal profiler Jang Tae-su is a well-known figure in South Korea. He pioneered the area of criminal behavior analysis in the nation and was among the first in his field. Within the police structure, he has earned everyone's respect and trust. At home, he is raising his daughter Jang Ha-bin alone as a single parent. He had one son that died from falling off a cliff, despite his daughter's young age he believes she pushed him. He kept Jang mostly confined to her room and questioned her repeatedly about that night. She often cries until her mother saves her, but always glares at her father. The mother eventually dies of suicide, but evidence once again points to foul play.

In the course of investigating a murder case some years later, Tae-su discovers that his daughter is in some way involved. His connection with his daughter and his professional ideas are completely upended by the revelation. In order to keep his daughter safe, Tae-su finds it difficult to tell the truth.

== Cast and characters ==
=== Main ===
- Han Suk-kyu as Jang Tae-su

One of South Korea's top profilers and a single father raising his only daughter, Ha-bin. He is a self-taught criminal behavior analyst who has earned unparalleled respect and trust within the police force since profiling was not even a word. However, when an incident shakes up his professional beliefs and his relationship with his beloved daughter, he struggles to uncover the truth in order to protect the one thing that means the world to him.

- Chae Won-bin as Jang Ha-bin
  - Lee Ye-joo as young Ha-bin

Tae-su's only daughter who is a high school student. She looks ordinary, but like her father, she has an extraordinary ability to keenly observe and understand people. She also hides a secret that will shake the life of her father.

=== Supporting ===
Criminal Behavior Analysis Team

- Han Ye-ri as Lee Eo-jin

A member of Criminal Behavior Analysis Team under Tae-su at Yeonju Police Station. She studied in the United Kingdom and majored in criminal psychology, and always prioritizes facts over emotions and cases over people. Although she respects Tae-su as a role model, she feels suspicious about his appearance as if he is hiding something.

- Roh Jae-won as Gu Dae-hong

A member of Criminal Behavior Analysis Team under Tae-su at Yeonju Police Station. He thinks that knowing criminals is a faster way to the truth than using traditional evidence.

Violent Crimes Unit 1 of Criminal Investigation Division

- Yoon Kyung-ho as Oh Jeong-hwan

A passionate team leader of Violent Crimes Unit at Yeonju Police Station who thinks detectives are the core of the police force and is often in conflict with Tae-su.

- Lee Shin-ki as Kim Yong-su

A detective of Violent Crimes Unit at Yeonju Police Station who supports his team leader and takes care of his subordinates. He enjoys profiling and criminal psychology, takes personal interest to Tae-su but maintains a poker face because he is conscious of Jeong-hwan.

- Lee Gyo-yeop as Cho Kyung-bin

An action-oriented detective of Violent Crimes Unit at Yeonju Police Station who has to say what he wants to say to get relief.

- Ki Jin-woo as Park Jae-hoon

The youngest detective of Violent Crimes Unit at Yeonju Police Station.

Forensic Science Investigation Team

- Lee Yang-hee as Hwang Young-soo

A veteran in forensic science investigation and has known Tae-su since he worked at the headquarters.

Tae-su's family

- Oh Yeon-soo as Yoon Ji-su

Tae-su's ex-wife and Ha-bin's mother. She stands at the center of father-daughter narrative and amplifies the mystery surrounding it.

People involve in the murder case

- Han Su-a as Song Min-ah

A runaway girl who is presumed to be involved in some incident and becomes entangled with Ha-bin.

- Kim Jeong-jin as Choi Young-min

A runaway family leader who cannot control his emotions and acts impulsively.

- Choi Yu-hwa as Kim Seong-hee

The landlord of the runaway family's dormitory and a single mother who raises her elementary school-aged son alone.

- Yoo Eui-tae as Park Jun-tae

Ha-bin's homeroom teacher who is a person with conviction as a teacher and takes great care of his students.

Others

- Park Kyung-geun as Lee Seok-moon

Chief of police at Yeonju Police Station.

- Yoon Jae-chan as Ko Se-ho

One of the members of a runaway group.

== Production ==
=== Development ===
Writer Han Ah-young, who won the 2021 MBC Drama Scriptwriting Contest Excellence Award, and PD Song Yeon-hwa, who worked on MBC dramas such as The Red Sleeve (2022) and Hunted (2022), team up for the series. In addition, this work, which is being pre-produced, is a masterpiece that even MBC is watching carefully due to the large production cost being invested.

Ascendio and Woodside managed the production with the former announced that they had signed a production and supply contract with MBC worth ₩9.6 billion for the series.

=== Casting ===
In 2023, Han Suk-kyu was reportedly cast for the lead role on November 16, and he was officially confirmed on December 5. This was also Han's return to MBC after 29 years.

In 2024, Chae Won-bin was reportedly cast for the daughter role on January 17, and she was officially confirmed on April 2. Han Ye-ri was reportedly cast on February 22, and she was officially confirmed on April 8. Oh Yeon-soo, Roh Jae-won, and Yoon Kyung-ho were confirmed to appear on April 16, 23 and 26, respectively.

=== Filming ===
Principal photography began in March 2024.

== Release ==
Doubt was scheduled to air on MBC TV in the second half of 2024 as part of MBC TV's Friday–Saturday lineup. On July 26, MBC TV announced that the series would be broadcast in October 2024. On September 4, the series was confirmed to premiere on October 11, 2024, at 21:50 (KST). It is also available to stream on Wavve, Netflix, Coupang Play, and Kocowa.

== Viewership ==
Doubt : South Korea viewers per episode (millions)

Season	Episode number										Average
Season	1	2	3	4	5	6	7	8	9	10	Average
1	0.855	0.795	0.844	0.849	0.979	1.170	0.837	1.029	1.178	1.521	1.006

Source: Audience measurement performed nationwide by Nielsen Korea.

Average TV viewership ratings
Ep.	Original broadcast date	Average audience share	
Ep.	Original broadcast date	Nielsen Korea	
Ep.	Original broadcast date	Nationwide	Seoul
1	October 11, 2024	5.6% (10th)	5.5% (10th)
2	October 12, 2024	4.7% (8th)	4.3% (8th)
3	October 18, 2024	5.8% (10th)	5.1% (9th)
4	October 19, 2024	5.5% (6th)	5.4% (5th)
5	October 26, 2024	6.0% (4th)	6.5% (3rd)
6	November 1, 2024	7.6% (5th)	7.0% (5th)
7	November 2, 2024	5.3% (7th)	4.9% (4th)
8	November 8, 2024	6.9% (6th)	6.3% (5th)
9	November 9, 2024	6.8% (4th)	6.3% (3rd)
10	November 15, 2024	9.6% (3rd)	9.2% (3rd)
Average		6.4%	6.1%
In the table above, the blue numbers represent the lowest ratings and the red numbers represent the highest ratings.

== Accolades ==
=== Awards and nominations ===
Award ceremony	Year	Category	Nominee	Result	Ref.
Baeksang Arts Awards	2025	Best Drama	Doubt	Nominated	
Baeksang Arts Awards	2025	Best Director	Song Yeon-hwa	Won	
Baeksang Arts Awards	2025	Best Actor	Han Suk-kyu	Nominated	
Baeksang Arts Awards	2025	Best New Actor	Kim Jeong-jin	Nominated	
Baeksang Arts Awards	2025	Best New Actress	Chae Won-bin	Won	
Baeksang Arts Awards	2025	Best Technical Achievement	Lee Jin-suk, Lee Deok-hoon (Cinematography)	Nominated	
Bechdel Day	2025	Bechdel Choice 10	Doubt	Included	
Cine21 Awards	2024	Actor of the Year (Series)	Han Suk-kyu	Won	
Cine21 Awards	2024	New Actress of the Year (Series)	Chae Won-bin	Won	
DFX OTT Awards	2025	Best New Actor	Yoon Jae-chan	Won	
Grimae Awards	2024	Best Picture (Drama)	Doubt	Won	
Grimae Awards	2024	Best Director	Song Yeon-hwa	Won	
Grimae Awards	2024	Best Editing	Doubt	Won	
Grimae Awards	2024	Best Actor	Han Suk-kyu	Won	
Grimae Awards	2024	Best Actress	Chae Won-bin	Won	
Italia Global Series Festival	2025	Best Picture	Doubt	Won	
Italia Global Series Festival	2025	Best Actor	Han Suk-kyu	Won	
Korea Broadcasting Prizes	2025	Grand Prize (Daesang)	Doubt	Won	
MBC Drama Awards	2024	Grand Prize (Daesang)	Han Suk-kyu	Won	
MBC Drama Awards	2024	Drama of the Year	Doubt	Nominated	
MBC Drama Awards	2024	Top Excellence Award, Actor in a Miniseries	Han Suk-kyu	Nominated	
MBC Drama Awards	2024	Best Supporting Actor	Yoon Kyung-ho	Nominated	
MBC Drama Awards	2024	Best Supporting Actress	Han Ye-ri	Nominated	
MBC Drama Awards	2024	Best New Actor	Kim Jeong-jin	Nominated	
MBC Drama Awards	2024	Best New Actor	Roh Jae-won	Nominated	
MBC Drama Awards	2024	Best New Actress	Chae Won-bin	Won	
MBC Drama Awards	2024	Best Couple Award	Han Suk-kyu and Chae Won-bin	Nominated	

=== Listicles ===
Name of publisher, year listed, name of listicle, and placement
Publisher	Year	Listicle	Placement	Ref.
Cine21	2024	Top 10 Series of 2024	1st place	
South China Morning Post	2024	The 15 best K-dramas of 2024	3rd place	
