= The Third Marriage =

2023–2024 South Korean television series

- Promotional poster
- Hangul: 세 번째 결혼
- RR: Se beonjjae gyeolhon
- MR: Se pŏntchae kyŏrhon
- Genre: Romance; Revenge
- Created by: Jang Jae-hoon
- Written by: Seo Hyun-joo
- Directed by: Lee Jae-jin; Kang Tae-heum
- Starring: Oh Seung-ah; Yoon Sun-woo; Yoon Hae-young; Jeon No-min; Oh Se-young; Moon Ji-hoo; Park Young-woon
- Country of origin: South Korea
- Original language: Korean
- No. of episodes: 132

Production
- Producer: Baek Ho-min
- Running time: 30–35 minutes
- Production company: MBC C&I

Original release
- Network: MBC TV
- Release: October 23, 2023 – May 3, 2024

The Third Marriage (Korean: 세 번째 결혼) is a South Korean television series starring Oh Seung-ah, Yoon Sun-woo, Yoon Hae-young, Jeon No-min, Oh Se-young, Moon Ji-hoo, and Park Young-woon. It aired on MBC TV from October 23, 2023, to May 3, 2024, every Monday to Friday at 19:05 (KST).

== Synopsis ==
The Third Marriage tells the story of Jung Da-jung (Oh Seung-ah) who was initially cheerful with positive attitude setting out on a path of revenge after living a life of manipulation.

== Cast ==
=== Main ===
- Oh Seung-ah as Jung Da-jung
- Yoon Sun-woo as Wang Yo-han
- Yoon Hae-young as Min Hae-il
- Jeon No-min as Wang Je-guk
- Oh Se-young as Kang Se-ran
- Moon Ji-hoo as Baek Sang-chul
- Park Young-woon as Wang Ji-hoon

=== Supporting ===
==== Da-jung's family ====
- Lee Kan-hee as Han Ma-ri
- Ahn Nae-sang as Shin Deok-su
- Kim Si-on as Baek Song-yi

==== Se-ran's family ====
- Choi Ji-yeon as Cheon Ae-ja
- Kim Young-pil as Kang Man-seok

==== Mrs. Yoon's family ====
- Ban Hyo-jung as Yoon Bo-bae
- Jung Sae-byul as Yang Mi-soon

==== Others ====
- Park Sang-hoo as Gu Cheon-won
- Lee A-rin as Wang An-na
- Yoo Ji-ae as Ha-rin

== Original soundtrack ==
=== Part 1 ===
Released on December 22, 2023
No.	Title	Lyrics	Music	Artist	Length
1.	"Lallala" (랄라라)	Invincible W	Invincible W; Lee Han	Park Sang-hoo	3:30
2.	"Lallala" (랄라라; Inst.)		Invincible W; Lee Han		3:30
Total length:					7:00

=== Part 2 ===
Released on January 28, 2024
No.	Title	Lyrics	Music	Artist	Length
1.	"With You" (그대와 함께)	Jeon Chan-woong; Lee Sang-min	Jeon Chan-woong; Lee Sang-min	Melodie	3:45
2.	"With You" (그대와 함께; Inst.)		Jeon Chan-woong; Lee Sang-min		3:45
Total length:					7:30

=== Part 3 ===
Released on February 5, 2024
No.	Title	Lyrics	Music	Artist	Length
1.	"Goodbye" (잘가)	Invincible W	Invincible W; Lee Han	Song Min-kyung	3:46
2.	"Goodbye" (잘가; Inst.)		Invincible W; Lee Han		3:46
Total length:					7:32

=== Part 4 ===
Released on February 12, 2024
No.	Title	Lyrics	Music	Artist	Length
1.	"Heartbreaking Love" (가슴 아픈 사랑아)	Ant; Midnight	Ant; Midnight	Friday	3:56
2.	"Heartbreaking Love" (가슴 아픈 사랑아; Inst.)		Ant; Midnight		3:56
Total length:					7:52

== Production ==
On March 13, 2024, the series was extended by ten episodes, from 122 episodes to 132 episodes.

== Viewership ==
The Third Marriage : South Korea viewers per episode (thousands)

Episodes	Episode number																					
Episodes	1	2	3	4	5	6	7	8	9	10	11	12	13	14	15	16	17	18	19	20	21	22
1–22	718	709	645	567	590	562	628	619	635	604	586	611	666	698	604	750	628	630	734	608	645	698
23–44	604	618	669	692	791	785	865	694	813	717	672	N/A	723	N/A	N/A	N/A	N/A	N/A	N/A	N/A	N/A	N/A
45–66	N/A	927	993	952	953	912	990	927	1015	1091	939	954	957	955	1035	974	976	1022	976	981	983	1012
67–88	958	1003	1014	1061	1054	985	1004	1147	1082	1053	1022	1068	1059	1058	1043	1028	1043	1134	998	937	955	987
89–110	1032	1023	974	891	954	1072	1094	881	1126	1050	1110	1151	1061	1133	1122	1149	1107	1118	1299	1100	1137	1180
111–132	1209	1180	1175	1150	1092	728	1089	1248	1111	1024	1046	1049	1106	1162	1101	1041	982	1136	1102	1043	1088	1082

Source: Audience measurement performed nationwide by Nielsen Korea.

Average TV viewership ratings
Ep.	Original broadcast date	Average audience share		
Ep.	Original broadcast date	Nielsen Korea		TNmS
Ep.	Original broadcast date	Nationwide	Seoul	Nationwide
1	October 23, 2023	4.3% (13th)	3.9% (14th)	4.6% (13th)
2	October 24, 2023	4.5% (12th)	4.4% (11th)	5.3% (10th)
3	October 26, 2023	4.1% (12th)	3.8% (12th)	4.5% (10th)
4	October 27, 2023	3.5% (18th)	2.9% (20th)	4.6% (12th)
5	October 31, 2023	3.8% (13th)	3.7% (12th)	5.1% (8th)
6	November 1, 2023	3.5% (17th)	3.0% (18th)	5.9% (9th)
7	November 2, 2023	3.6% (15th)	3.0% (16th)	5.1% (10th)
8	November 6, 2023	3.8% (19th)	3.3% (19th)	5.6% (12th)
9	November 7, 2023	3.8% (14th)	3.2% (15th)	4.8% (11th)
10	November 9, 2023	4.0% (13th)	3.5% (14th)	4.5% (13th)
11	November 10, 2023	3.4% (15th)	2.8% (17th)	5.7% (9th)
12	November 14, 2023	3.8% (12th)	3.4% (12th)	5.2% (9th)
13	November 15, 2023	3.8% (14th)	3.1% (13th)	5.6% (9th)
14	November 16, 2023	3.9% (13th)	3.0% (16th)	5.2% (10th)
15	November 17, 2023	3.3% (18th)	3.1% (19th)	N/A
16	November 20, 2023	4.3% (16th)	3.8% (15th)	5.6% (10th)
17	November 21, 2023	3.6% (14th)	3.2% (14th)	5.2% (13th)
18	November 22, 2023	3.8% (14th)	3.2% (16th)	5.9% (9th)
19	November 23, 2023	4.2% (9th)	3.5% (15th)	5.7% (10th)
20	November 24, 2023	3.7% (18th)	N/A	6.3% (9th)
21	November 27, 2023	3.7% (18th)	N/A	5.9% (7th)
22	November 28, 2023	4.1% (12th)	3.4% (15th)	5.9% (7th)
23	November 29, 2023	3.8% (15th)	3.2% (15th)	5.9% (9th)
24	November 30, 2023	3.7% (15th)	3.1% (16th)	6.0% (9th)
25	December 1, 2023	3.9% (16th)	3.5% (18th)	5.8% (10th)
26	December 4, 2023	4.2% (16th)	3.8% (14th)	5.0% (12th)
27	December 5, 2023	4.5% (9th)	4.2% (9th)	5.6% (8th)
28	December 6, 2023	4.3% (11th)	3.9% (11th)	5.5% (10th)
29	December 7, 2023	4.8% (10th)	4.2% (11th)	6.3% (7th)
30	December 8, 2023	4.2% (14th)	3.7% (16th)	6.4% (8th)
31	December 11, 2023	5.0% (11th)	4.4% (11th)	6.8% (7th)
32	December 12, 2023	4.0% (14th)	3.0% (16th)	6.1% (8th)
33	December 13, 2023	4.0% (16th)	3.5% (16th)	7.1% (7th)
34	December 14, 2023	4.3% (10th)	N/A	6.4% (7th)
35	December 15, 2023	4.4% (12th)	4.1% (13th)	6.5% (7th)
36	December 18, 2023	4.6% (16th)	N/A	6.4% (9th)
37	December 19, 2023	4.6% (11th)	N/A	6.1% (10th)
38	December 20, 2023	4.6% (12th)	N/A	6.2% (10th)
39	December 21, 2023	4.9% (9th)	N/A	N/A
40	December 22, 2023	4.6% (12th)	N/A	N/A
41	December 25, 2023	5.5% (12th)	N/A	N/A
42	December 26, 2023	5.5% (7th)	N/A	N/A
43	December 27, 2023	5.5% (8th)	N/A	N/A
44	December 28, 2023	6.0% (5th)	N/A	N/A
45	December 29, 2023	5.1% (9th)	N/A	N/A
46	January 1, 2024	5.2% (13th)	4.9% (13th)	N/A
47	January 2, 2024	5.6% (8th)	5.1% (7th)	N/A
48	January 3, 2024	5.4% (11th)	4.8% (11th)	N/A
49	January 4, 2024	5.3% (8th)	4.6% (8th)	N/A
50	January 5, 2024	5.3% (9th)	4.6% (12th)	N/A
51	January 8, 2024	5.9% (9th)	5.5% (8th)	N/A
52	January 9, 2024	5.4% (8th)	4.9% (9th)	N/A
53	January 10, 2024	5.4% (7th)	4.7% (11th)	N/A
54	January 11, 2024	6.4% (6th)	5.7% (4th)	N/A
55	January 12, 2024	5.3% (9th)	4.6% (11th)	N/A
56	January 15, 2024	5.8% (7th)	5.6% (4th)	N/A
57	January 16, 2024	5.5% (7th)	5.0% (8th)	N/A
58	January 17, 2024	5.5% (7th)	5.4% (7th)	N/A
59	January 18, 2024	5.9% (6th)	4.8% (8th)	N/A
60	January 19, 2024	5.7% (7th)	5.0% (8th)	N/A
61	January 22, 2024	5.2% (10th)	4.5% (13th)	N/A
62	January 23, 2024	5.9% (8th)	5.2% (8th)	N/A
63	January 24, 2024	5.6% (8th)	5.0% (8th)	N/A
64	January 25, 2024	5.8% (8th)	4.8% (8th)	N/A
65	January 26, 2024	5.7% (10th)	5.3% (9th)	N/A
66	January 29, 2024	6.0% (6th)	5.8% (3rd)	N/A
67	January 30, 2024	5.6% (7th)	5.2% (6th)	N/A
68	January 31, 2024	5.7% (7th)	5.0% (6th)	N/A
69	February 1, 2024	6.1% (7th)	5.4% (4th)	N/A
70	February 2, 2024	6.2% (8th)	5.7% (7th)	N/A
71	February 5, 2024	6.2% (7th)	5.5% (6th)	N/A
72	February 6, 2024	5.7% (7th)	5.0% (6th)	N/A
73	February 7, 2024	5.9% (7th)	5.3% (6th)	N/A
74	February 8, 2024	6.3% (5th)	5.9% (6th)	N/A
75	February 13, 2024	6.5% (6th)	5.6% (5th)	N/A
76	February 14, 2024	6.0% (7th)	5.2% (9th)	N/A
77	February 15, 2024	6.1% (8th)	5.4% (6th)	N/A
78	February 16, 2024	6.0% (7th)	5.0% (11th)	N/A
79	February 19, 2024	6.3% (6th)	5.5% (8th)	N/A
80	February 20, 2024	6.3% (6th)	5.4% (6th)	N/A
81	February 21, 2024	6.1% (6th)	5.3% (8th)	N/A
82	February 22, 2024	5.9% (6th)	4.7% (7th)	N/A
83	February 23, 2024	5.6% (9th)	4.7% (11th)	N/A
84	February 26, 2024	6.5% (6th)	5.6% (6th)	N/A
85	February 27, 2024	5.9% (7th)	5.1% (9th)	N/A
86	February 28, 2024	5.6% (8th)	4.9% (10th)	N/A
87	February 29, 2024	5.4% (7th)	4.7% (7th)	N/A
88	March 1, 2024	5.4% (9th)	4.7% (12th)	N/A
89	March 4, 2024	6.2% (6th)	5.4% (5th)	N/A
90	March 5, 2024	6.0% (5th)	5.1% (6th)	N/A
91	March 6, 2024	5.5% (7th)	4.7% (10th)	N/A
92	March 7, 2024	5.1% (7th)	4.1% (9th)	N/A
93	March 8, 2024	5.4% (11th)	5.0% (9th)	N/A
94	March 11, 2024	6.4% (5th)	5.5% (6th)	N/A
95	March 12, 2024	6.1% (6th)	5.1% (6th)	N/A
96	March 13, 2024	5.0% (11th)	4.3% (10th)	N/A
97	March 14, 2024	6.0% (5th)	5.1% (5th)	N/A
98	March 15, 2024	6.0% (8th)	5.4% (8th)	N/A
99	March 18, 2024	6.5% (6th)	5.5% (5th)	N/A
100	March 19, 2024	6.6% (5th)	6.1% (5th)	N/A
101	March 20, 2024	6.3% (6th)	6.0% (5th)	N/A
102	March 21, 2024	6.3% (5th)	5.6% (4th)	N/A
103	March 22, 2024	6.4% (8th)	5.9% (6th)	N/A
104	March 25, 2024	7.0% (5th)	6.4% (4th)	N/A
105	March 26, 2024	6.9% (6th)	5.9% (5th)	N/A
106	March 27, 2024	6.5% (6th)	5.9% (4th)	N/A
107	March 28, 2024	7.1% (3rd)	6.4% (2nd)	N/A
108	March 29, 2024	6.1% (8th)	5.8% (4th)	N/A
109	April 1, 2024	6.7% (5th)	6.1% (4th)	N/A
110	April 2, 2024	6.9% (4th)	6.3% (2nd)	N/A
111	April 3, 2024	6.9% (6th)	6.1% (4th)	N/A
112	April 4, 2024	6.8% (5th)	5.8% (4th)	N/A
113	April 5, 2024	6.8% (7th)	6.2% (4th)	N/A
114	April 8, 2024	6.7% (4th)	6.3% (3rd)	N/A
115	April 9, 2024	6.3% (5th)	5.9% (4th)	N/A
116	April 11, 2024	4.6% (10th)	4.3% (11th)	N/A
117	April 12, 2024	6.6% (6th)	6.1% (5th)	N/A
118	April 15, 2024	7.8% (5th)	7.5% (2nd)	N/A
119	April 16, 2024	6.9% (3rd)	6.8% (2nd)	N/A
120	April 17, 2024	6.3% (6th)	5.4% (3rd)	N/A
121	April 18, 2024	6.2% (5th)	5.6% (4th)	N/A
122	April 19, 2024	6.5% (5th)	6.0% (4th)	N/A
123	April 22, 2024	6.4% (5th)	5.6% (5th)	N/A
124	April 23, 2024	6.7% (4th)	6.1% (2nd)	N/A
125	April 24, 2024	6.4% (5th)	5.7% (5th)	N/A
126	April 25, 2024	6.4% (5th)	6.2% (2nd)	N/A
127	April 26, 2024	6.1% (7th)	5.5% (5th)	N/A
128	April 29, 2024	6.7% (5th)	5.8% (4th)	N/A
129	April 30, 2024	6.5% (5th)	6.3% (2nd)	N/A
130	May 1, 2024	6.3% (6th)	5.4% (6th)	N/A
131	May 2, 2024	6.5% (5th)	6.2% (2nd)	N/A
132	May 3, 2024	6.4% (6th)	6.4% (4th)	N/A
Average		5.5%	4.4% (Note: This average ratings is calculated based on the published ratings, the exact average ratings is unknown due to multiple ratings not published.)	— (Note: The exact average ratings is unknown due to multiple ratings not published.)
In the table above, the blue numbers represent the lowest ratings and the red numbers represent the highest ratings.
