= 2023 Grimae Awards =

2023 South Korean television awards ceremony

- Native name: 2023 그리메상 시상식
- Awarded for: Best in Drama, Documentary, TV Commercial and Variety Show
- Date: November 22, 2023
- Site: M Lounge of the MBC building in Mapo-gu, Seoul
- Country: South Korea
- Hosted by: Seo In
- First award: 1993

Highlights
- Most wins: My Dearest

The 2023 Grime Awards ceremony was held at the M Lounge of the MBC building in Mapo-gu, Seoul on November 22, 2023.

The 'Grimae Award' is an award established by the Korea Directors of Photography Society (KDPS) in 1993. It is presented to works that demonstrate the most outstanding visual aesthetics and creativity during the year. The winner was decided through a vote by cinematographers.

== Winners ==
Winners is referenced by:

2023 Grimae Awards Winners
Award Category	Genre	Affiliation	Winner(s)	Work Title
Grand Prize (Daesang)	Drama	MBC	Kim Hwa-young, Kang Gyeong-ho, Jeon Ho-seung, Kim Mi-hyun	My Dearest
Best Picture	Studio/Video	Brave Pictures	Jung Chang-soo, Park Jae-hyung, Kim Chan-yong	Physical: 100
Best Picture	Culture/Docu	Freelance	Kim Jung-geun	KBS UHD Environment Special 2, Part 1: God's Campus, Divine Mudflat
Excellence Award	Regional	UBC	Lee Hee-jin	Traveler of the Earth
Excellence Award	Drama	KBS	Heo Guk-hoe	KBS Drama Special 2022: Silence of the Lambs
Excellence Award	Culture/Docu	KBS	Lee Hee-ju	KBS UHD Environment Special 2, Part 8: There is No Earth for the Dead
Excellence Award	Show/Music	EBS	Lim Hyung-eun, Kim Yong-sang	Space Gonggam
Excellence Award	Show/Music	KBS	Park Jun-su, Lee Moon-gyu, Hong Jung-yoon, Lee Hee-ju, Jo Byung-woo, Lee Jun-beom, Park Seong-beom, Kim Tae-hyun, Han Seung-jung	Korea Now
Excellence Award	Studio/Video	SBS	Jin Seung-jae, Kim Deok-ju, Kim Yeon-jun, Lee Cheol, Jo Jin-hyun, Song Nak-hoon, Hwang In-wook, Lee Cheol-ho	SBS Inkigayo
Regional Award	Culture/Docu	KBS Busan	Jung Yeon-il, Lee Jung-chan, Lee Soo-hwan, Kim Hyun-woo	Image in Busan
New Cinematographer	Culture/Docu	KBS Jeju	Ryu Dong-jeon	UHD Soundscape Documentary: Mute
Best Director	Drama	MBC	Kim Seong-yong, Cheon Soo-jin, Lee Han-joon	My Dearest
Best Lighting	Drama	LimeLite	Kwon Min-gu	My Dearest
Best Actor (Male)	Drama	—	Namkoong Min	My Dearest
Best Actor (Female)	Drama	—	Ahn Eun-jin	My Dearest
