= 2021 Grimae Awards =

2021 South Korean television awards ceremony

- Native name: 2021 그리메상 시상식
- Awarded for: Best in Drama, Documentary, TV Commercial and Variety Show
- Date: December 3, 2021
- Site: Stanford Hotel in Sangam-dong, Seoul
- Country: South Korea
- First award: 1993

The 2021 Grime Awards ceremony was held at the Grand Ballroom on the 2nd floor of the Stanford Hotel in Sangam-dong, Seoul on December 3, 2021.

The 'Grimae Award' is an award established by the Korea Directors of Photography Society (KDPS) in 1993. It is presented to works that demonstrate the most outstanding visual aesthetics and creativity during the year. The winner was decided through a vote by cinematographers.

== Winners ==
2021 Grimae Awards Winners
Award Category	Genre	Affiliation	Winner(s)	Work Title
Grand Prize (Daesang)	Drama	SBS	Lee Jong-seok, Jeon Se-woon, Lee Seung-hoon, Lee Jae-seong	The Penthouse: War in Life Seasons 2 & 3
Best Picture	Studio/Video	KBS	Park Jun-su, Jeong Yeon-jin, Park Seung-hwan	Kiss The Universe
Best Picture	Documentary	UBC	Go Hyung-na	Garden of Seasons, Kitchen Garden
Best Picture	Documentary	MBC	Lee Myung-gwan, Park Hyung-jun, Kim Mu-seong	Docuplex: Wild Idol
Excellence Award	Documentary	SBS	Park Jong-gi, Park Chan-woong	The History: Forgotten Memories (Parts 1-2)
Excellence Award	Documentary	JIBS	Kim Dong-young, Kim Gyeong-yoon	Jeju Pig, Shaking Taste Buds
Excellence Award	Documentary	KBS	Seung Se-ri	Documentary Insight - Colorful Rainbow
Excellence Award	Show/Music	MBC	Ryu In-hwan, Kim Ung	2020 MBC Gayo Daejejeon
Excellence Award	Show/Music	SBS	SBS Production Team 1	LOUD
Excellence Award	Studio/Video	EBS	EBS Studio Video Team	Kim-Gam-Gi - Women and Humanity
Excellence Award	Variety	Freebie	Seong Geun-hye	Gon, Choices of Fate
Excellence Award	Drama	SBS	Hwang In-hyeok, Eom Si-tak	Lovers of the Red Sky
Excellence Award	Drama	KBS	Lee Woo-kyung	Landscape of Pain
New Media Category	New Media	EBS	Ahn Jun-young	The Moment the Heart Shines
New Media Category	New Media	MBC	Kang Gyeong-ho, Kim Sang-hun, Lee Jong-hyun	ART FOR LIFE: Yuki Kuramoto Concert
Regional Category	Documentary	G1	Kim Jong-seok, Kim Sang-in	Wandering - Going to the DMZ
Regional Category	Documentary	Busan MBC	Ju Dong-wook	Forbidden Alley - 16th Part
Best Cinematographer	—	MBC	Ham Eun-soo	—
New Cinematographer	Documentary	Wonju MBC	Kim Yeon-myung	Gangwon, House (Parts 1-2)
Best Director	Documentary	UBC	Lee Jeong-ho	Garden of Seasons, Kitchen Garden
Best Lighting	Drama	—	Kim Geun-soo	The Penthouse: War in Life Seasons 2 & 3
Achievement Award	—	Lotte Home Shopping	Baek Chang-kyu	Contributor to national broadcasting
Best Actor (Male)	—		Im Ki-soon	The Penthouse: War in Life Seasons 2 & 3
Best Actor (Female)	—		Kim Seon-bin	The Penthouse: War in Life Seasons 2 & 3
New Actor	—		Lee Shin-gi	Landscape of Pain
Appreciation Award	—	Dgininside	Kim Jong-won	—
