= 2025 Grimae Awards =

205 South Korean television awards ceremony

38th Grimae Awards
- Native name: 2025 그리메상 시상식
- Awarded for: Best in Drama, Documentary, TV Commercial and Variety Show
- Date: December 10, 2025
- Site: M Lounge of the MBC building in Mapo-gu, Seoul
- Country: South Korea
- First award: 1993

The 2025 Grimae Awards ceremony, organised by the Korea Directors of Photography Society (KDPS) and sponsored by Panasonic, held at the M Lounge of the MBC building in Mapo-gu, Seoul on December 10, 2025.

The 'Grimae Award' is an award established by the Korean Association of Cinematographers in 1993. It is presented to works that demonstrate the most outstanding visual aesthetics and creativity during the year. The winner was decided through a vote by cinematographers.

== Winners ==
Winners is referenced by:

2025 Grimae Awards Winners
Award Category	Genre	Affiliation	Winner(s)	Work Title
Grand Prize (Daesang)	Regional	G1 Broadcasting	Kim Sang-min, Shin Ik-gyun, Shim Deok-heon, Kim Jong-seok	Border Exploration Panorama, Wall of the World
Best Picture	Documentary	MBC	Kim Hwa-young, Jeon Ho-seung	80th Liberation Anniversary Special Documentary: Model Prison
Best Picture	Show/Music	KBS	Park Jun-su, Yang Jin-yong, Son Yeon-seok, Lee Jun-beom, Lee Hee-ju, Kim Hyun-woo	80th Liberation Anniversary KBS Special: Cho Yong-pil, Forever Lee Soon-jae
Excellence Award	Drama	SBS A&T	Lee Seung-ju, Lee Jae-seong	The Winning Try
Excellence Award	Documentary	KBS	Park Chan-jun	Docu Insight: Perfect Days
Excellence Award	Show/Music	SBS	Lee Seok-hoon, Kim Ji-hyun, Moon Da-som	SBS Inkigayo
Excellence Award	Studio/Video	EBS	Lee Eung-seok, Ahn Jun-young	DangDangDangDangDang
Regional Award	Regional	KBS Jeju	Kim Deok-gon, Jo Byung-woo	Hero's Return, Re-lease
New Cinematographer	Documentary	KBS	Gil Chae-geun	Fighting Does Not Lose
