= Park Young-woon =

South Korean actor (born 1990)

- Born: January 18, 1990 (age 36); South Korea
- Occupation: Actor
- Years active: 2010; 2017–present
- Agent: Ascendio

Korean name
- Hangul: 박영운
- RR: Bak Yeongun
- MR: Pak Yŏngun

Park Young-woon (Korean: 박영운; born January 18, 1990) is a South Korean actor.

== Filmography ==
=== Film ===
Film appearances
Year	Title	Role	Ref.
2010	Be With Me	Yong Sang	
2022	The Killer: A Girl Who Deserves to Die		

=== Television series ===
Television series appearances
Year	Title	Role	Notes	Ref.
2017	The King in Love	Moo Suk		
2022	Fanletter, Please!	Choi Sil-jang		
2022	The Fabulous	Park Man	Cameo (Episode 7–8)	
2023	Agency	CM Prince	Cameo (Episode 1)	
2023–2024	The Third Marriage	Wang Ji-hoon		
2025	Bon Appétit, Your Majesty	Shin Soo-hyuk		

=== Web series ===
Web series appearances
Year	Title	Role	Ref.
2022	Bad Girlfriend	Yoon Tae-oh	
2022–2023	The Director Who Buys Me Dinner	Min Yu-dam	
