= Knight Flower =

2024 South Korean television series

- Promotional poster
- Hangul: 밤에 피는 꽃
- Lit.: Flower That Blooms at Night
- RR: Bame pineun kkot
- MR: Pame p'inŭn kkot
- Genre: Period drama; Comedy; Action; Romance
- Based on: Flower That Blooms at Night by Ttol-i, Jeongro, Yuna, Beth, Lee Sam, and Jeong Myung-in
- Developed by: Namkoong Seong-wu (planning)
- Written by: Lee Sam; Jeong Myung-in
- Directed by: Jang Tae-yoo; Choi Jung-in; Lee Chang-woo
- Creative director: Pyo Hee-seon
- Starring: Lee Hanee; Lee Jong-won; Kim Sang-joong; Lee Ki-woo
- Music by: Jeon Chang-yeop
- Country of origin: South Korea
- Original language: Korean
- No. of episodes: 12

Production
- Executive producer: Park Soo-young
- Producers: Kim Jeong-mi; Lee Wol-yeon; Yang So-young; Yoon Hong-mi
- Cinematography: Kim Sung-han; Jo Min-chul; Jung Soon-dong; Hwang Jin-dong
- Editor: Choi Min-young
- Running time: 70 minutes
- Production companies: Base Story; Film Grida; Saram Entertainment

Original release
- Network: MBC TV
- Release: January 12 – February 17, 2024

Knight Flower (Korean: 밤에 피는 꽃) is a 2024 South Korean television series starring Lee Hanee, Lee Jong-won, Kim Sang-joong, and Lee Ki-woo. It is based on a webtoon of the same Korean title, which was launched through KakaoPage on August 14, 2023. It aired on MBC TV from January 12, to February 17, 2024, every Friday and Saturday at 21:50 (KST). It is also available for streaming on Wavve and Coupang Play in South Korea, on Kocowa in the Americas, and on Viki in selected regions.

The series received audience acclaim, with its final episode recording 18.4% in nationwide ratings and achieved a new record of being number one of any Friday–Saturday dramas in MBC history.

== Synopsis ==
The series revolves around Jo Yeo-hwa, a widow who is the daughter-in-law of the most prestigious noble family in Joseon. She lives the quiet reclusive life of a noble widow at home during the day, but sneaks out of their house at night to help people in need.

== Cast and characters ==
=== Main ===
- Lee Hanee as Jo Yeo-hwa
  - Moon Seung-you as young Jo Yeo-hwa

A widow for fifteen years who is living a double life.

- Lee Jong-won as Park Soo-ho

A military officer who is intelligent and has excellent martial arts skills.

- Kim Sang-joong as Seok Ji-sung

Yeo-hwa's father-in-law who is the left state councillor.

- Lee Ki-woo as Park Yoon-hak

Soo-ho's older brother who is a third rank royal secretary and one of the king's trusted men.

=== Supporting ===
==== Yeo-hwa's people ====
- Park Se-hyun as Lee Yeon-sun
  - Kim Yeon-ji as young Yeon-sun

Yeo-hwa's friend.

- Yoon Sa-bong as Jang So-woon

Current owner of the 200-year-old Hwayeonsangdan.

- Lee Woo-je as Hwal-yu

So-woon's secretary and right-hand man.

- Jung Ye-na as Kkot-nim

A child who has been going to a nobleman's house to receive sewing supplies.

==== Yeo-hwa's in-laws ====
- Kim Mi-kyung as Yoo Geum-ok

Yeo-hwa's mother-in-law.

- Oh Eui-shik as Seok Jeong

Yeo-hwa's husband and Ji-sung's son.

- Jung So-ri as Seok Jae-i

Ji-sung's youngest daughter and Yeo-hwa's sister-in-law.

- Nam Mi-jung as Bong Mal-daek

Ji-sung's family's long-time servant.

==== People around Soo-ho ====
- Jung Yong-joo as Bi-chan

Self-proclaimed right-hand man of Soo-ho.

- Kim Kwang-kyu as Hwang Chi-dal

A second rank military officer and Soo-ho's superior.

- Oh Ye-joo as Hwang Yi-kyung

Chi-dal's youngest daughter.

==== People around Ji-sung ====
- Heo Jung-do as Yi So

The king of Joseon.

- Seo Yi-sook as Oh Nan-kyung

Heung-jib's wife.

- Jo Jae-yoon as Kang Pil-jik

A person who is involved in all kinds of corruption.

- Woo Kang-min as Man-sik

Pil-jik's subordinate.

==== Others ====
- Kim Hyung-mook as Yeom Heung-jib

The minister of taxation.

- Park Sung-woo as Jo Sung-hoo

Yeo-hwa's older brother.

- Jo Seung-yeon as Im Kang

The head of the late king's guard.

- Choi Yu-hwa as Lady Baek

The minister of personnel's widowed daughter-in-law.

- Lee Kang-min as Yong-deok

Lady Baek's lover and a servant of Heung-jib's family.

== Production ==
The series was produced in Cheongsong County. Its main filming location was at the Songso Historic House, a national folklore cultural heritage and one of the top tourist destinations in the county.

Filming of the series had completed by August 2023.

== Release ==
Knight Flower was initially scheduled for release in the second half of 2023, but was pushed back to January 2024. On November 15, 2023, it was announced that the series would premiere on January 12, 2024.

== Original soundtrack ==
=== Part 1 ===
Released on January 20, 2024
No.	Title	Lyrics	Music	Artist	Length
1.	"My Love By My Side" (내 사랑 내 곁에)	Zeenan; OneTop; J-Season	Zeenan; OneTop; J-Season	Zeenan	4:12
2.	"My Love By My Side" (내 사랑 내 곁에; Inst.)		Zeenan; OneTop; J-Season		4:12
Total length:					8:24

=== Part 2 ===
Released on January 26, 2024
No.	Title	Lyrics	Music	Artist	Length
1.	"Blade" (칼날)	Lee Young-ji; Zeenan; OneTop; J-Season	Lee Young-ji; Layone; Averzi; Zeenan; OneTop; J-Season	Lee Young-ji, Zeenan	3:30
2.	"Blade" (칼날; Inst.)		Lee Young-ji; Layone; Averzi; Zeenan; OneTop; J-Season		3:30
Total length:					7:00

=== Part 3 ===
Released on January 27, 2024
No.	Title	Lyrics	Music	Artist	Length
1.	"Close My Eyes" (두 눈을 감으면)	Ashmoon; Park Seok-won; Joo Ji-hoon	Ashmoon; Park Seok-won; Joo Ji-hoon	Lee Su-jung	3:41
2.	"Close My Eyes" (두 눈을 감으면; Inst.)		Ashmoon; Park Seok-won; Joo Ji-hoon		3:41
Total length:					7:22

=== Part 4 ===
Released on February 4, 2024
No.	Title	Lyrics	Music	Artist	Length
1.	"My Hope" (바램)	J-Season; Yeo Jae-min	J-Season; Yeo Jae-min	Seo Da-hyun	3:33
2.	"My Hope" (바램; Inst.)		J-Season; Yeo Jae-min		3:33
Total length:					7:06

=== Part 5 ===
Released on February 9, 2024
No.	Title	Lyrics	Music	Artist	Length
1.	"Love From the Beginning" (처음부터 사랑이었다)	J-Season; It Turned Out to Be a Coma	J-Season; It Turned Out to Be a Coma; Choi Cheol-hoon	Lee Dong-yoon	3:43
2.	"Love From the Beginning" (처음부터 사랑이었다; Inst.)		J-Season; It Turned Out to Be a Coma; Choi Cheol-hoon		3:43
Total length:					7:26

=== Part 6 ===
Released on February 10, 2024
No.	Title	Lyrics	Music	Artist	Length
1.	"Flower Blooming Night" (밤의 개화)	Ahn Su-wan; Kim Hee-jae; J-Season	Ahn Su-wan; Kim Hee-jae; J-Season	Juwontak	3:50
2.	"Flower Blooming Night" (밤의 개화; Inst.)		Ahn Su-wan; Kim Hee-jae; J-Season		3:50
Total length:					7:40

== Reception ==
=== Viewership ===
Knight Flower : South Korea viewers per episode (millions)

Season	Episode number												Average
Season	1	2	3	4	5	6	7	8	9	10	11	12	Average
1	1.495	1.529	1.916	1.375	1.964	2.224	2.286	2.227	1.980	2.492	2.815	3.395	2.142

Source: Audience measurement performed nationwide by Nielsen Korea.

Average TV viewership ratings
Ep.	Original broadcast date	Average audience share (Nielsen Korea)	
Ep.	Original broadcast date	Nationwide	Seoul
1	January 12, 2024	7.9% (4th)	7.7% (4th)
2	January 13, 2024	8.2% (3rd)	7.9% (3rd)
3	January 19, 2024	10.8% (2nd)	11.0% (1st)
4	January 20, 2024	7.9% (2nd)	7.2% (2nd)
5	January 26, 2024	11.4% (2nd)	12.0% (1st)
6	January 27, 2024	12.5% (2nd)	12.5% (2nd)
7	February 2, 2024	13.1% (1st)	12.7% (1st)
8	February 3, 2024	12.6% (2nd)	12.1% (2nd)
9	February 9, 2024	11.0% (1st)	10.3% (1st)
10	February 10, 2024	12.9% (2nd)	12.1% (2nd)
11	February 16, 2024	15.4% (1st)	14.7% (1st)
12	February 17, 2024	18.4% (2nd)	18.1% (1st)
Average		11.8%	11.5%
In the table above, the blue numbers represent the lowest ratings and the red numbers represent the highest ratings.

=== Accolades ===
==== Awards and nominations ====
Name of the award ceremony, year presented, category, nominee of the award, and the result of the nomination
Award ceremony	Year	Category	Nominee / Work	Result	Ref.
Baeksang Arts Awards	2024	Best Actress	Lee Hanee	Won	
Baeksang Arts Awards	2024	Best New Actor	Lee Jong-won	Nominated	
Korea Drama Awards	2024	Grand Prize (Daesang)	Lee Hanee	Won	

==== Listicles ====
Name of publisher, year listed, name of listicle, and placement
Publisher	Year	Listicle	Placement	Ref.
Cine21	2024	Top 10 Series of 2024	7th place (Note: Tied with The Frog.)	
