= The Boss discography =

South Korean boy band

- Studio albums: 2
- Extended plays: 2
- Soundtrack albums: 2
- Live albums: 1
- Singles: 14
- Video albums: 2
- Music videos: 13

South Korean boy band The Boss has released two studio albums, two extended plays, and fourteen singles since debuting in March 2010. The band has also participated in singing OSTs of Japanese shows and movies.

== Studio albums ==
Title	Details	Peak chart positions	Sales
Title	Details	JPN	Sales
Love Letters	Released: January 18, 2012 (JPN); Label: Sony Music Entertainment; Format: CD, CD+DVD	7	JPN: 14,379
On the Way	Released: March 13, 2013 (JPN); Label: Sony Music Entertainment; Format: CD, CD + DVD	16	

== Extended plays ==
Title	Details	Peak chart positions	Sales
Title	Details	KOR	Sales
Awake	Released: June 17, 2010 (KOR); Label: Open World Entertainment; Format: CD, digital download; Track list: 1. The Boss (intro); 2. 비틀비틀 (Stumble Stumble); 3. 아무도.. 그 누구도 (Nobody...Anybody); 4. New Boyz; 5. The One; 6. 눈부신 세계 (Shining World); 7. 동경소년 (Admiring Boy)	31	
Chapter II	Released: November 28, 2013 (KOR); Label: POOM Entertainment; Format: CD, digital download; Track list: 1. Sad Story; 2. We Are Together; 3. Why Goodbye; 4. 니가 뭔데? (What are You?); 5. 너 떄문에 (Because of You)	31	KOR: 4,998

== Singles ==
Title	Year	Peak chart positions		Sales	Album
Title	Year	KOR	JPN	Sales	Album
Korean
"Admiring Boy " (동경소년)	2010	66	—		Awake
"Stumble Stumble" (비틀비틀)	2010	77			Awake
"I'll Love You Until it Snows in Summer" (한 여름날 눈이 내릴 때까지 너를 사랑해) (as Popsicle)	2011	111	—		Non-album singles
"Lady"	2011	138	—	KOR: 10,302	Non-album singles
"Why Goodbye"	2013	—	—		Chapter II
"Rilla Go!"	2014	—	—	KOR: 4,199	Non-album singles
"Who?"	2015	—	—		Non-album singles
"Lucky Man"	2017	—	—		Non-album singles
Japanese
"Love Power"	2011	—	9	JPN: 12,136+	Love Letters
"Love Bingo!"	2011	—	11	JPN: 14,202+	Love Letters
"Love Parade"	2011	—	9	JPN: 18,386+	Love Letters
"Love Days"	2011	—	7	JPN: 17,758+	Love Letters
"Jumping"	2012	—	5	JPN: 17,597+	Non-album singles
"Honki Magic"	2012	—	7	JPN: 19,202+	Non-album singles
"Valentine Fighter"	2013	—	10	JPN: 12,129+	Non-album singles
"Oh My Girl!"	2016	—	12	JPN: 10,452+	Non-album singles
"—" denotes releases that did not chart or were not released in that region.

== Soundtracks ==
Year	Title	Information
2011	"Girlfriend"	Nippon TV show – Guru Guru Ninety Nine ending theme
2012	"Ikenai 1・2・3" (いけない1・2・3)"	Ai wo Utau yori Ore ni Oborero! movie

== Videography ==
=== Live albums ===
Title	Album details	Peak chart positions	Sales
Title	Album details	JPN	Sales
大国男児 Japan First Live 2012	Released: June 6, 2012 (JPN); Labels: Sony Music Entertainment; Format: DVD; Track list: 1. Opening; 2. Love Power; 3. Friends; 4. Girlfriend; 5. MC1; 6. Love song for you 7. Back stage story vol.1 8. Futari no Suki na Akanezora (二人の好きな茜空?); 9. Ubaitai Ima sugu ni (奪いたい今すぐに?); 10. Mō Saigo ni Naru to... (もう最後になると…?); 11. Back stage story vol.2 12. MC2; 13. Wasurenai (わすれない?); 14. Kataomoi (片想い?); 15. Dearest; 16. MC3; 17. Love Bingo!; 18. Love Days; 19. Love Parade; 20. Magic; 21. Back stage story vol.3 22. Jumping; 23. Love Story; 24. Ending; 25. Special Opening Movie	8	JPN: 2,910+

=== Video albums ===
Title	Album details	Peak chart positions	Sales
Title	Album details	JPN	Sales
テバッ！大国男児 (Daebak! Daikoku Danji) Vol.1	Released: October 26, 2011 (JPN); Labels: Sony Music Entertainment; Format: DVD	62	
テバッ！大国男児 (Daebak! Daikoku Danji) Vol.2	Released: February 29, 2012 (JPN); Labels: Sony Music Entertainment; Format: DVD	65	

=== Music videos ===
Year	Music video
2010	"Admiring Boy"
2010	"Stumble Stumble"
2011	"Love You 'Til the End"
2011	"Love Power"
2011	"Love Bingo!"
2011	"Love Parade"
2011	"Lady" "Lady - Live Full Vers."
2011	"Love Days"
2012	"Love Story"
2012	Jumping
2012	Honki Magic
2013	"Valentine Fighter"
2013	"Why Goodbye"
2014	"Rilla Go!"
2017	"Lucky Man"
