= Daikoku Danji Japan First Live 2012 =

Video by The Boss
- Released: June 6, 2012
- Recorded: March 20, 2012 at Shibuya Public Hall
- Genre: J-pop
- Language: Japanese
- Label: Sony Music Entertainment

Daikoku Danji Japan First Live 2012 (大国男児 Japan First Live 2012) is the first live DVD released by South Korean boy group The Boss. It was released on June 6, 2012 on their Japanese label Sony Music Entertainment.

== Information ==
The DVD was the first live DVD by The Boss. The DVD features the live concert which was held at Shibuya Public Hall in Tokyo on March 20, 2012, and also includes rehearsal, backstage footage and private footage. The first press edition comes with a trading card randomly selected from six kinds.

== Track listing ==
1. Opening
2. Love Power
3. Friends
4. Girlfriend
5. MC1
6. Love song for you
7. Back stage story vol.1
8. Futari no Suki na Akanezora (二人の好きな茜空)
9. Ubaitai Ima sugu ni (奪いたい今すぐに)
10. Mō Saigo ni Naru to... (もう最後になると…)
11. Back stage story vol.2
12. MC2
13. Wasurenai (わすれない)
14. Kataomoi (片想い)
15. Dearest
16. MC3
17. Love Bingo!
18. Love Days
19. Love Parade
20. Magic
21. Back stage story vol.3
22. Jumping
23. Love Story
24. Ending
25. Special Opening Movie

== Charts ==
Chart (2011)	Peak position
Japan Oricon Daily DVD Chart	8
Japan Oricon Weekly DVD Chart	13

== Release history ==
Country	Date	Format	Label
Japan	June 6, 2012	DVD SRBL-1530	Sony Music Entertainment
