= Son Woo-hyeon =

- 손우현
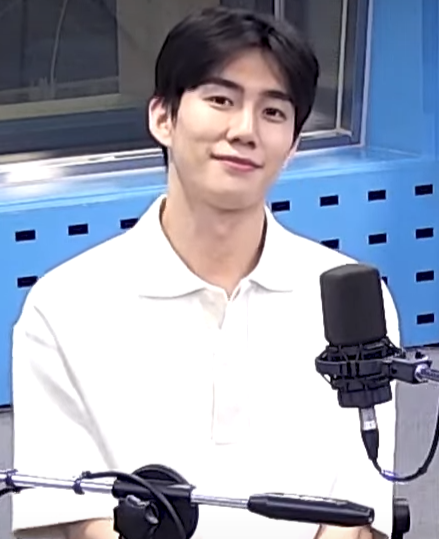
- Son in July 2023
- Born: Son Hyeon-seok; 30 November 1989 (age 36); Daejeon, South Korea (Note: Mentioned in an Instagram Live held on 28th February 2021.)
- Education: Kookmin University (BA)
- Occupations: Actor; singer; songwriter
- Years active: 2009–present
- Agent: Saram Entertainment
- Notable work: Nokdu Flower; To My Star
- Awards: 2017 Seoul Film Festival (SFF) 2nd place (Is Mr. Kim Dead)
- Musical career
- Genres: K-pop; soft rock; soul; R&B
- Instruments: Vocals; guitar; piano
- Label: Open World Entertainment (Note: During the promotional period as a member of X-5 only, between 2011 and 2012.)
- Formerly of: X-5

Korean name
- Hangul: 손우현
- Hanja: 孫佑弦
- RR: Son Uhyeon
- MR: Son Uhyŏn

Birth name
- Hangul: 손현석
- Hanja: 孫玄石
- RR: Son Hyeonseok
- MR: Son Hyŏnsŏk
- Website: Son Woo-hyeon

Signature
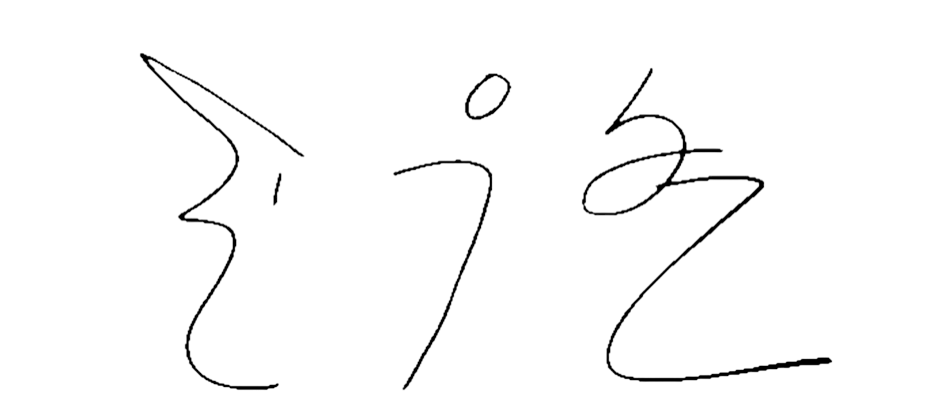

Son Woo-hyeon, commonly known as Son Woo-hyun, (born Son Hyeon-seok on 30 November 1989), is a South Korean actor, singer, and songwriter.

In 2011, Son achieved his acting debut when he was cast in the widely acclaimed South Korean TV series Miss Ripley. Having made his name, Son then appeared in a variety of different roles from numerous successful South Korean films and television series. Some of his most notable works include The Nokdu Flower (2019), Touch (2020), Mouse (2021), and The Golden Spoon (2022).

== Early life and education ==
Son Woo-hyeon was born with the name Son Hyeon-seok on 30 November 1989 in the Seo district of the fifth largest city in South Korea, Daejeon. Being raised in a family of four, Son is the youngest child in the family. Son received elementary education at Seowon Elementary School in Deajeon. After graduation, Son went to Daejeon Samcheon Middle School and Chungnam High School for his secondary education. Son successfully enrolled into Kookmin University, studying at the Department of Theater and Film, Faculty of Performing Arts and earned his bachelor's degree.

== Career ==
=== 2009–2011: Beginnings and Three Musketeers ===
In 2009, Son debut as a member in a trio band called the Three Musketeers under the record label of Open World Entertainment. During the promotion period, Son used the stage name of "Hwarang". In early March 2010, the band made a comeback with a change of concept as a nursery rhyme dance group and the title song of "Eat Eat" (Hangul: "먹어 먹어"). The title track became an instant hit and is widely used in reality shows as background music whenever there are scenes involving the performers eating on-air, notably in Up To The King. Recently it has become the representative background music of Delicious Guys.

=== 2011–2012: X-5 and acting debut ===
With the Open World Entertainment's decision to merge and rebrand the trio band, Son debuted as the leader of a K-pop idol group X-5, under the stage name as "Ghun" on 19 April 2011. Following their successful debut, X-5 gained significant attention and was popularly known as "Tall Idols". At the time, they also received a lot of support and publicity as the "sibling-group" of The Boss, a boy band from the same agency.

On 22 April 2011, the single Xenos was released and the title song "Shohajima" featured. During the premier stage, X-5 left a strong impression with the audience as they performed and danced while wearing sunglasses. Six months later, on 9 December 2011, they released a mini-album Dangerous, featuring the title track of the same name.

In May 2012, Son made his acting debut when X-5 is cast in the critically acclaimed television series Miss Ripley (2011). As a 2011 commercial success, it attracted publicity and attention to the group. In the following month, Son was again cast in another television series Spy Myung-wol (2011). Produced and aired by Korean Broadcasting System (KBS), one of the three leading television broadcasters in South Korea, the series achieved a viewership rating of more than 10 in its premier run.

On 13 April 2012, a little under a year after the official debut, X-5 was forced to cancel all planned public appearances with future activities put on hold after a scandal surrounding the CEO of Open World Entertainment unfolded. Following the arrest of the CEO in December 2012, X-5 officially disbanded and Son ended his contract with Open World Entertainment, leaving the agency shortly thereafter.

=== 2013–2014: Military enlistment and hiatus ===
On 4 December 2012, to not cause any disruptions, Son quietly enlisted into the Republic of Korea Armed Forces to serve his mandatory military service. During the conscription, Son served as a sergeant in the Air Force Flight 722 of Republic of Korea Air Force. He was discharged from service in late 2014.

=== 2015–2018: Comeback and silver screen debut ===
Following his discharge from the military, Son focused his career direction on acting and has since taken on various roles on silver screen and television projects. Starting in 2015, Son received multiple high-level endorsements from some, if not the largest Fortune 500 global brands like Apple, Samsung, LG, Kia, and Nivea, for the roles he plays during the product launches and advertisements. On top of that, Son also played a leading role in a South Korean government campaign X-project, managed and run by the Ministry of Science, ICT and Future Planning.

In 2016, Son had his comeback on television series since his enlistment into the military. He was cast in Blow Breeze (2016), a romance comedy South Korean drama about a North Korean girl who is interested in dancing and who defects to South Korea where she meets a lawyer who will be her lover for life. The series gathered an average nationwide viewership rating 15 for its runs of 50 episodes on MBC between August 27, 2016 to February 26, 2017.

Later in 2016, Son played a leading role in a short film Butterfly Effect (2016) as he transitioned from television series to the silver screen.

In 2017, Son has his first silver screen debut when he is offered a supporting role in Excavator (2017), a war film that follows a paratrooper through series of events during the May 18, 1980 Gwangju Uprising also known as the "May 18 Gwangju Democratization Movement". In the same year, Son received a leading role offer in an office-romance web series titled Love Intern Choi Woo Sung (2017), where he played an office intern who finally realises the cold-hard reality of modern society. Son took up a role in another 2017 web series No Bad Days (2017), which told the story of a woman in her twenties who is trying to find a balance between work, love, and relationships.

2018 marked a smooth sailing year for Son as he continued to rise in the acting industry with Live (2018) taking precedence. Directed by Kim Kyu-tae and starring the hallyu star Lee Kwang-soo, Live (2018) gathered much needed attention thanks to its release on both Netflix and cable television. Son's role as a patrol police officer in the series put him under spotlight when viewers are fond of his police-uniformed appearance. A few months later, Son appeared in Just Dance (2018), a life and sport genre television series based on documentary of the same name. It tells a story of a group of student at Geoje Girl's Vocational High School with different dreams, trying all out to be better dancers despite their struggles in life. About the same period, Son also resumes his original role in No Bad Days 2 (2018) as sequel to the 2017 web series No Bad Days, where he was previously cast in.

=== 2019–2020: Rising popularity and mainstream success ===
Starting from 2019, Son sees an elevation in his career in terms of public attention and role offerings resulting from his higher level of participation in mainstream television series produced and aired by leading South Korean broadcaster, notably the MBC, SBS and TvN. This is backed by the fact that television series made under the branding of leading broadcasters are often able to top the chart and dominate the Nationwide viewership ranking for their ability to gather significant publicity and interests from Hallyu audiences around the world. Marking the start is Nokdu Flower, a SBS's 2019 historical television series that focuses on the true events of Donghak Peasant Revolution and the Battle of Ugeumchi which took place in 1894. In the series, Son portrays the role of a righteous, sympathetic Commander of Joseon Imperial guard who feels deeply for the uprising peasants and is willing to assist them in achieving their good cause despite the opposite stance he is in. During its premier run, Nokdu Flower achieved a steady rating of 13.2 in Seoul metropolitan area alone and 11.5 nationwide.

The same year, Son was cast in TvN's Drama Stage Season 3 (2019) in the chapter of "Woman with a Bleeding Ear", playing the role of the boyfriend to a woman named Kim Soo Hee. Shortly thereafter, Son starred in a YouTube exclusive Web-series, About Youth (2019) which tells an inspiring story of four youths trying to achieve dreams in their own ways while fighting social and cultural stigmas. With Son's silver screen casting, he took up a supporting role in Crazy Romance (2019), the first commercial film directed by Kim Han Gyeol, which also marks 16 years since Kim Rae-won and Gong Hyo-jin last collaborated in the classic Korean drama Snowman.

In 2020, Son starred in youth action film Justice High (2020), directed by Chae Yeo-jun.

=== 2021–present: Breakthrough and continued success ===
In 2021, Son signed an exclusive contract with King Kong by Starship, a subsidiary of Starship Entertainment, which is often seen as a major player and a driving force behind the K-pop industry.

In second half of 2025, Son played Shakespeare in the play Shakespeare in Love at CJ Towol Theater, Seoul.

In August 2026, Son signed an exclusive contract with Saram Entertainment.

== Personal life ==
=== Military enlistment ===
On 4 December 2012, Son enlisted into the Republic of Korea Armed Forces to serve his mandatory military service. During the conscription, Son served as a sergeant in the Air Force Flight 722 of Republic of Korea Air Force. He was discharged from service on 4 December 2014.

== Filmography ==
=== Film ===
Year	Title	Original Title	Role	Notes	Ref.
2016	Butterfly Effect	나비효과	Joon-young	Lead role	
2017	Control	컨트롤			
2017	Excavator	포크레인	College student		
2017	Is Mr. Kim Dead?	김씨는 죽었을까?		Lead role	
2018	Bomberman	봄버맨	Min Jae-ho	Lead role	
2019	Crazy Romance	가장 보통의 연애	Do-yoon		
2020	Justice High	공수도	Hae-sung	Lead role	
2021	To My Star	나의 별에게	Kang Seo-joon	Lead role	
2021	You Ghosted Me for a Week	니가 일주일 넘게 연락이 없어서	Joo-won	Lead role	
2021	We're not good at parting	우리는 이별에 서툴러서	Hae Rang [Seg. Relationship Forest]	Lead role	
2022	Jjamppong Bigwon	짬뽕비권	Park Soon-kyung	Special appearance - as a Constable	
2024	You Are the Apple of My Eye	Korean: 그 시절, 우리가 좋아했던 소녀	Seon-ah's groom	Cameo	

=== Television series ===
Year	Title	Original Title	Role	Notes	Ref.
2011	Miss Ripley	미스 리플리	Himself	Special appearance as X-5, (Ep 3)	
2011	Spy Myung-Wol	스파이 명월	Trainee	(Ep 9-10)	
2016	Blow Breeze	불어라 미풍아	Deputy Yoon		
2018	Live	라이브	Patrol police officer	Special appearance	
2018	Just Dance	땐뽀걸즈		Special appearance	
2019	Nokdu Flower	녹두꽃	Lee Gyu-tae		
2019	Drama Stage Season 3	드라마 스테이지 3	Choo Jae-young	Segment: Woman with a Bleeding Ear	
2020	Touch	터치	Lee Hyun-joon		
2020	Tale of the Nine-Tailed	구미호뎐	Jung Hyun-woo	Cameo (Ep. 2, 9, 16)	
2021	Mouse	마우스	Kim Joon-seong	Cameo (Ep. 3-4, 18)	
2021	Revolutionary Sisters	오케이 광자매	Na Pyun-seung		
2021	Doom at Your Service	어느 날 우리집 현관으로 멸망이 들어왔다	Siberia (Novelist)	Cameo (Ep. 3)	
2022	The Golden Spoon	금수저	Jang Moon-gi		
2023	Battle for Happiness	행복배틀	Lee Jin-seop		
2025	God's Beads	신의 구슬	Han Dam		

=== Web series ===
Year	Title	Original Title	Role	Notes	Ref.
2017	Love Intern Choi Woo Sung	연애인턴 최우성	Choi Woo-sung		
2017–2018	No Bad Days	오늘도 무사히	Park Jeong-woo	Season 1–2	
2019	About Youth	어바웃유스	Park Ha-woong		
2019	Cat's Bar	고양이 바텐더	Ik-hyun		
2021–2022	To My Star	나의 별에게	Kang Seo-joon	Season 1–2	
2021–2022	To My Star 2: Our Untold Stories	나의 별에게 2	Kang Seo-joon	Season 1–2	
2025	The Love Story of Chunhwa	춘화연애담	Crown Prince Seung		

=== Music video appearances ===
Year	Title	Artist(s)	Ref.
2024	"Goodbye"	Urban Zakapa	

== Stage ==
=== Musical ===
Musical play performances
Year	Title		Role	Theater	Date	Ref.
Year	English	Korean	Role	Theater	Date	Ref.
2024	A Gentleman's Guide to Love and Murder	젠틀맨스 가이드	Monty Navarro	Kwanglim Arts Center BBCH Hall	July 6 to October 20	

=== Theater ===
Theater play performances
Year	Title		Role	Theater	Date
Year	English	Korean	Role	Theater	Date
2018	All the Faces of an Egg	달걀의 모든 얼굴	Secretary Myeong	Daehakro Theater – Beautiful Life	July 6, 2018 - July 15, 2018
2018	All the Faces of an Egg	달걀의 모든 얼굴	Secretary Myeong	Seongnam Arts Center	July 20, 2018 - July 22, 2018
2019	All the Faces of an Egg	달걀의 모든 얼굴	Secretary Myeong	Centro Cultural Aram Nuri de Goyang	September 27, 2019 - September 28, 2019
2023	Tebas Land		Martin Federico	Chungmu Art Center medium theater (black)	June 28, 2023 - September 24, 2023
2024 - 2025	Tebas Land		Martin Federico	Chungmu Art Center medium theater (black)	November 20, 2024 - February 9, 2025
2025	Shakespeare in Love	셰익스피어 인 러브	William Shakespeare	CJ Towol Theater	July 5, 2025 – September 14, 2025

== Discography ==
=== Soundtrack appearances ===
Title	Year	Album	Notes
"To My Star"	2021	To My Star (Original Webdrama Soundtrack)	Son Woo-hyeon
"Every Single Moment"	2022	To My Star (Original Television Soundtrack, Pt. 2)	Collaborating with Kim Kang-min

=== Music videos ===
Year	Title	Album	Artist(s)	Ref.
2011	"Dangerous"	Dangerous	X-5 (Note: Son Hyeon-seok (now Son Woo-hyeon), Lee Dong-hyun, Jung Hae-won, Jin Hyun-jin, Kim Jin-wan)	
2022	"Nothing"	Beautiful Moment OST Special Track	Son Woo-hyeon and Song Ji-Yeon	

== Songwriting credits ==
All credits are adapted from the Korea Music Copyright Association, unless stated otherwise.

Year	Title	Album	Artist(s)	Lyrics		Music		Arrangement	
Year	Title	Album	Artist(s)	Credited	With	Credited	With	Credited	With
2021	"To My Star"	To My Star (Original Webdrama Soundtrack)	Son Woo-hyeon	Yes	—N/a	Yes	—N/a	No	Shaun Kim, BXN1, BXN2
2022	"Every Single Moment"	To My Star (Original Television Soundtrack, Pt. 2)	Kim Kang-min and Son Woo-hyeon	Yes	—N/a	Yes	—N/a	No	Kwak Jeong-im, Hong Bo-ra
2022	"On A Starry Night"	To My Star (Original Television Soundtrack, Pt. 2)	Kim Da-eun	Yes	—N/a	Yes	—N/a	No	Kwak Jeong-im
2022	"TA-DAH!"	To My Star (Original Television Soundtrack, Pt. 2)	Young Ki	Yes	—N/a	Yes	—N/a	No	Kwak Jeong-im, Hong Bo-ra
