= Open World Entertainment =

South Korean independent record label and talent management company

- Type: Private
- Industry: Popular music
- Genre: K-pop, hip-hop, dance, teen pop
- Founded: 2000
- Founder: Jang Seok-woo
- Defunct: 2012
- Headquarters: Seoul, South Korea
- Number of locations: 2
- Area served: Worldwide
- Key people: Jang Seok-woo (CEO); Artists: Jun Jin; The Boss; X-5
- Services: Music albums Talent management
- Website: www.open-world.co.kr

Open World Entertainment was a South Korean independent record label and talent management company. It was founded in 2000 by Jang Seok-woo and its current roster of recording artists include Kim Horam, The Boss and X-5 as well as actors Ko Joo-won and Shin Ji-soo. Its records are distributed by LOEN Entertainment and has a partnership with Sony Music Entertainment Japan.

== Affiliation ==
In 2011, Open World Entertainment, holder of the trademark rights to boy band name of Shinhwa, granted the group permission to use the name as long as they perform together as a group. Hence allowing the group to established the 'Shinhwa Company', a joint venture agency for members to perform as a group. Open World also holds the rights to Shinhwa's overseas concerts with Shinhwa Company, and overseas licensing of the group's albums.

== Scandal ==
On 10 April 2012, Jang Seok-woo, the company's 51-year-old CEO, was arrested without warrant by undercover police detectives at his office. He was charged with habitual sexual harassment, assault and rape of his singers and trainees. Jang was identified as a "former boss of a criminal gang and a former nightclub owner".

Investigators interviewed over 20 victims and reported that over 30 victims were involved. The sexual assaults allegedly occurred on the company's fifth floor and the choreography rehearsal studio in the basement, where he allegedly gave female victims beer mixed with aphrodisiacs, then sexually assaulted them. He also coerced male group members, some were also minors at the time, to assist in the assaults and directed the assaults via text messages and watched the CCTV footage from his office on the fifth floor.

On the day of arrest, Open World Entertainment issued a press statement, accusing media sources for spreading exaggeration and false reports of the scandal and threatening them with legal action if they do not retract their articles and issue official apologies for defaming the artists in the agency. Jang categorically denied all charges at first, but has since admitted to committing some of the crimes. On 12 April 2012, the Kangnam Police Station announced that Jang's warrant cited 6 female victims, 2 of them underage minors.

Korean police have since released more reports which allege that the CEO forced male idol group members to sexually assault female trainees and that he sexually assaulted trainees from a girl group that he personally managed. Jang had personally overseen and managed the screening and training processes for aspiring trainees.

On 15 April 2012, Kangnam police officials stated:

“Since the end of 2010, the CEO sexually harassed six trainees over 10 times. In the process, he had also ordered male idol groups members under his own agency to harass them as well. We believe that the CEO had not used violence or threats to force the male idols into committing such acts, but rather his status and power. We will have to continue our investigations on whether there was such compliance at the actual scene.”

The male idol group members may also be charged, pending investigation, while the CEO could face charges of gang rape.

Since Jang was taken in police custody on 13 April, boy band The Boss has cancelled the planned released date of their first Korean album, and together with label mate X-5 have stopped their activities and performances.

In June 2013, Jang Seok-Woo was sentenced to six years in prison after appealing to the Supreme Court of Korea. He was charged with drugging and sexually assaulting eleven female trainees, some of whom were minors at the time of the assault.

== Location ==
- South Korea: Cheongdam-dong, Gangnam-gu

== Roster ==
=== Recording artists ===
- Lug
- Jun Jin (2006-2012)
- The Boss (2010-2012)
- X-5 (2011-2012)

==== Project/unit groups ====
- Popsicle

=== Actors/Actresses ===
- Ko Joo-won *left company 2012
- Shin Ji-soo *left company 2012

== Discography ==
- 2006: Jun Jin - Love Doesn't Come
- 2008: Jun Jin - New Decade
- 2009: Jun Jin - Fascination

=== 2010 ===
- The Boss - The Admirer
- The Boss - Awake

=== 2011 ===
- Popsicle - I Love You Until It Snows In Summer
- The Boss - Love Power
- X-5 - Xenos
- The Boss - Love Bingo!
- The Boss - Love Parade
- The Boss - Lady
- The Boss - Love Days
- X-5 - Dangerous

=== 2012 ===
- The Boss - Love Letters
- The Boss - Jumping
- The Boss - Honki Magic

=== YPA (Young Producers Association) ===
- YPA Project Album (JunJin, Gan Miyeon, Tei, K.Will, Brown Eyed Girls, After School)

== Concerts ==
- 1st Open World Festival Tokyo Japan - 26 November 2011
