= Touch (South Korean TV series) =

2020 South Korean television series

- Promotional poster
- Hangul: 터치
- RR: Teochi
- MR: T'ŏch'i
- Genre: Romantic comedy
- Written by: Ahn Ho-kyung
- Directed by: Min Yeon-hong
- Starring: Joo Sang-wook; Kim Bo-ra
- Country of origin: South Korea
- Original language: Korean
- No. of episodes: 16

Production
- Running time: 70 minutes
- Production companies: MI Inc. Story Networks

Original release
- Network: Channel A
- Release: January 3 – February 22, 2020

Touch (Korean: 터치) is a 2020 South Korean television series starring Joo Sang-wook and Kim Bo-ra. It aired on Channel A from January 3 to February 22, 2020. Some of the episodes were shot in Cheongyang county to promote its landmarks.

== Synopsis ==
A romantic comedy and beauty drama, where a makeup artist, who has become unemployed after failing to become an idol trainee, finds a new dream.

== Cast ==
=== Main ===
- Joo Sang-wook as Cha Jung-Hyuk, a beauty representative and makeup artist.
- Kim Bo-ra as Han Soo-yeon, the youngest assistant in tea beauty.

=== Supporting ===
- Ahn Sol-bin as Song Ha-won
- Han Da-gam
- Lee Tae-hwan
- Byun Jung-soo
- Yoon Hee-seok
- Hong Seok-cheon
- Son Woo-hyeon as Lee Hyun-joon
- Ahn Dong Yeop
- Jung Ji-yoon as Na Hye-jin
- Lee Su-ji
- Park Joong-geun
- Kim Young-jun
- Lee Sang-ah
- Kim Gwang-sik
- Yeonwoo as Jung Young-ah, a broadcast jockey and Han Soo-yeon's best friend.
- Song Jae-hee
- Lee Chae-eun
- Chae Joo-jwa
- Shin Jun-chul

=== Special appearances ===
- Moon Sook as Yoon Young-hee (CEO of Ohsung Group) (Ep. 6)
- Seo Ji-hoon
- Lee Yul-eum as Girl on the plane
- Park Soo-hong

== Ratings ==
In this table, the blue numbers represent the lowest ratings and the red numbers represent the highest ratings.

Ep.	Broadcast date	Average audience share (Nielsen Korea)
1	January 3, 2020	0.847%
2	January 4, 2020	0.907%
3	January 10, 2020	1.154%
4	January 11, 2020	0.736%
5	January 17, 2020	0.863%
6	January 18, 2020	0.789%
7	January 24, 2020	0.623%
8	January 25, 2020	0.645%
9	January 31, 2020	1.004%
10	February 1, 2020	0.624%
11	February 7, 2020	0.909%
12	February 8, 2020	0.493%
13	February 14, 2020	0.507%
14	February 15, 2020	0.855%
15	February 21, 2020	0.853%
16	February 22, 2020	0.758%
Average		0.785%

- This drama aired on a cable channel/pay TV which normally has a relatively smaller audience compared to free-to-air TV/public broadcasters (KBS, SBS, MBC and EBS).
