= Bitter Sweet Hell =

2024 South Korean television series

- Promotional poster
- Hangul: 우리, 집
- Lit.: Our House
- RR: Uri, jip
- MR: Uri, chip
- Genre: Black comedy; Thriller
- Written by: Nam Ji-yeon
- Directed by: Lee Dong-hyun; Wi Deuk-gyu
- Starring: Kim Hee-sun; Lee Hye-young; Kim Nam-hee; Yeonwoo
- Music by: Park Se-joon
- Country of origin: South Korea
- Original language: Korean
- No. of episodes: 12

Production
- Executive producer: Cha Sang-min
- Producers: Yoo Hong-gu; Lee Sung-hoon; Kim Kyung-jae; Jung Dong-seok; Kim Byung-min
- Cinematography: Hwang Sung-man; Kim Jung-hyuk
- Editors: Jo In-hyung; Lim Ho-chul
- Running time: 61–69 minutes
- Production company: Red Nine Pictures

Original release
- Network: MBC TV
- Release: May 24 – June 29, 2024

Bitter Sweet Hell (Korean: 우리집) is a 2024 South Korean television series written by Nam Ji-yeon, directed by Lee Dong-hyun, and starring Kim Hee-sun, Lee Hye-young, Kim Nam-hee, and Yeonwoo. It aired on MBC TV from May 24, to June 29, 2024, every Friday and Saturday at 21:50 (KST). It is also available for streaming on Viu in selected regions.

== Synopsis ==
The series tells the story of Noh Young-won who is recognized as the country's best family psychological counselor. When her career and family are threatened by an unknown blackmailer, she tries to protect her family by joining hands with her mother-in-law.

== Cast and characters ==
=== Main ===
- Kim Hee-sun as Noh Young-won

A successful family psychological counselor who lives a perfect life that many would envy.

- Lee Hye-young as Hong Sa-gang

Young-won's mother-in-law who is a famous mystery novel author and a devoted mother to her only son.

- Kim Nam-hee as Choi Jae-jin

Young-won's husband and Sa-gang's son who is a doctor.

- Yeonwoo as Lee Se-na

A mysterious person with many secrets.

=== Supporting ===
==== Young-won and Sa-gang's family ====
- Kwon Hae-hyo as Choi Go-myeon

A former Prosecutor General and Young-won's father-in-law.

- Park Jae-chan as Choi Do-hyun

Young-won and Jae-jin's son.

- Hwang Chan-sung as Noh Young-min

Young-won's childish younger brother.

==== People around Young-won ====
- Choi Jeong-in as Ra-kyung

Young-won's secretary.

==== People around Sa-gang ====
- Ahn Gil-kang as Park Kang-sung

Sa-gang's helper and runs a corn noodle restaurant.

==== People around Jae-jin ====
- Shin So-yul as Oh Ji-eun

A plastic surgeon.

- Jung Gun-joo as Moon Tae-oh

Do-hyun's tutor.

==== Others ====
- Kim Jung-heon as Gu Kyung-tae

A police officer.

- Han Sung-min as So Yi

Do-hyun's senior who is honest and outspoken.

- Han Sang-jo as Park Seung-jae

Kang-sung's nephew and Young-min's friend.

- Jung Woong-in as Jung Doo-man

A private investigator.

=== Extended ===
- Bae Woo-jin

== Production ==
=== Development ===
Bitter Sweet Hell was originally scheduled for release in the second half of 2023, under its former title Gaslighting (가스라이팅; Gaseuraiting). Kim Seung-woo, who wrote and directed the 2019 film Bring Me Home, was initially announced to participate as the creator and director of the series.

=== Casting ===
Actress Kang Hae-rim was initially confirmed to play the role of Lee Se-na. However, in October 2023, it was revealed that filming for the series was temporarily halted in August. After filming about five episodes of the series, reorganization began due to lead actress Kim Hee-sun's movie promotion schedules and the production company was changed from JPX Studio to Red Nine Pictures. She had to drop out of the series during the production suspension period. In January 2024, it was announced that actress Yeonwoo had joined the cast, taking over Kang Hae-rim's role.

In November 2023, it was revealed that the director was also changed to Lee Dong-hyun, who directed She Knows Everything (2020) and Doctor Lawyer (2022).

== Reception ==
=== Viewership ===
Bitter Sweet Hell : South Korea viewers per episode (thousands)

Season	Episode number												Average
Season	1	2	3	4	5	6	7	8	9	10	11	12	Average
1	989	973	1047	801	1050	911	934	841	965	895	894	986	941

Source: Audience measurement performed nationwide by Nielsen Korea.

Average TV viewership ratings
Ep.	Original broadcast date	Average audience share (Nielsen Korea)	
Ep.	Original broadcast date	Nationwide	Seoul
1	May 24, 2024	6.0% (6th)	5.7% (6th)
2	May 25, 2024	5.5% (4th)	5.2% (3rd)
3	May 31, 2024	6.2% (7th)	6.3% (4th)
4	June 1, 2024	4.9% (5th)	4.5% (5th)
5	June 7, 2024	6.0% (7th)	6.2% (4th)
6	June 8, 2024	5.1% (5th)	4.9% (5th)
7	June 14, 2024	5.1% (10th)	4.9% (9th)
8	June 15, 2024	4.8% (5th)	4.5% (5th)
9	June 21, 2024	5.5% (9th)	5.6% (6th)
10	June 22, 2024	4.9% (6th)	4.7% (7th)
11	June 28, 2024	5.6% (8th)	5.6% (5th)
12	June 29, 2024	5.5% (6th)	5.0% (6th)
Average		5.4%	5.6%
In the table above, the blue numbers represent the lowest ratings and the red numbers represent the highest ratings.
