= Shibuya Public Hall =

Theatre in Shibuya, Tokyo, Japan

Coordinates: 35°39′51.55″N 139°41′51.91″E

Line Cube Shibuya
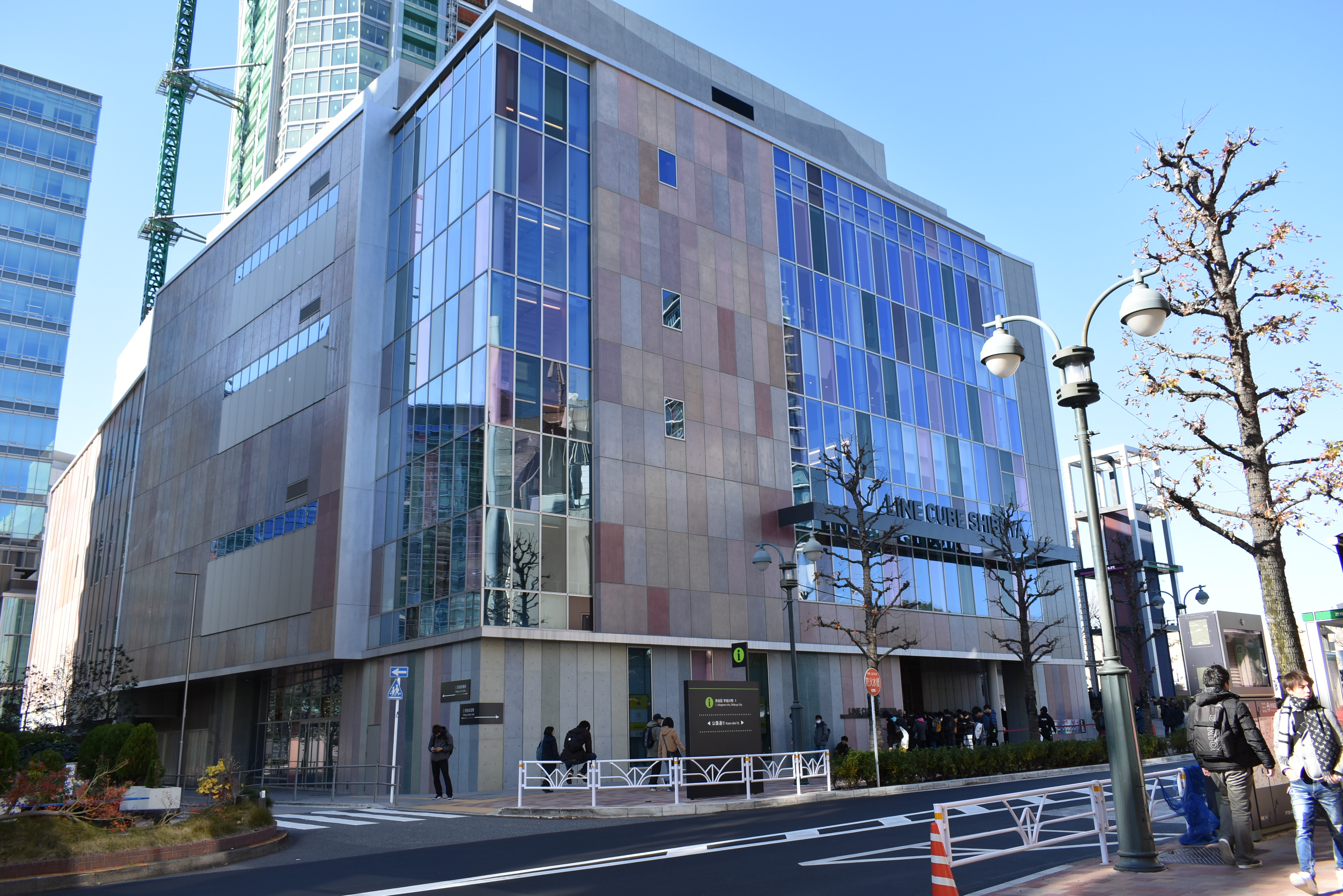
- Line Cube Shibuya, 2019
- Interactive map of Line Cube Shibuya
- Former names: C.C. Lemon Hall (2006–2011)
- Location: Shibuya, Tokyo, Japan
- Owner: City of Shibuya
- Seating type: Reserved
- Capacity: 2,084
- Type: Indoor theatre

Construction
- Opened: 1964
- Renovated: 2006, 2019

Website
- Line Cube Shibuya

Shibuya Public Hall (Japanese: 渋谷公会堂, Hepburn: Shibuya Kōkaidō) (also known as Line Cube Shibuya for sponsorship reasons) is a theatre located in Shibuya, Tokyo, Japan. It was completed in 1964 to host the weightlifting events in the 1964 Summer Olympics.

The theatre was sponsored by Dentsu and Suntory, which paid ¥80 million to rename it C.C. Lemon Hall (after their beverage of the same name) from 2006 to 2011.

The hall closed on October 4, 2015, for reconstruction work. It was reopened on October 13, 2019, when it was again renamed; this time as Line Cube Shibuya. The new management team is formed by Amuse, Inc. (representative company), Line Corporation and Pacific Art center until March 31, 2029.

== Notable events ==
- The Tamla-Motown Festival was held February 13, 1968, at the Hall featuring Stevie Wonder and Martha & the Vandellas.
- Rory Gallagher played here on January 26 and 27, 1975.
- Iron Maiden played here two times in 1982.
- George Duke played here November 30 – December 1, 1983.
- U2 played at the hall for the first time with two concerts on November 26 and 27, 1983, during their War Tour.
- A-ha held two concerts here July 3 and 5, 1986
- Weather Report played a concert here on January 13, 1972. Part of the concert was released on their sophomore album, I Sing the Body Electric. The full concert appears on the album Live in Tokyo.
- Loudness recorded their live VHS/Beta Live-Loud-Alive: Loudness in Tokyo here on November 2, 1983. However, the double LP of the same name was not, that was recorded at Nakano Sun Plaza during the same tour.
- Bon Jovi recorded a concert in support of their 7800° Fahrenheit album there on April 28, 1985. It was to be released on VHS and Laserdisc in Japan later on. Furthermore, parts of this live performance were shown in the video clip of their single The Hardest Part Is the Night.
- Metallica performed here in support of their album Master of Puppets on November 15, 1986. It was the band's first ever show in Asia and one of their earliest with then bassist Jason Newsted, who had replaced Cliff Burton following the latter's death.
- Dead End recorded their live video Psychoscape here on September 24, 1988. They held a 25th anniversary concert here on September 16, 2012, which was later released as the live DVD Kaosmoscape.
- X Japan recorded their live video Blue Blood Tour Bakuhatsu Sunzen Gig here on March 16, 1989. The tickets for the show sold out in two hours, months in advance.
- Susumu Hirasawa recorded his first solo live video/album Error, with a 5-piece live band and a 32-piece orchestra, here on July 11, 1990. He also recorded the live videos Sim City Tour, with vocalist Miss N., on September 6, 1995; and Nomonos and Imium, with vocalist Masami Orimo, on January 24–26, 2013.
- Malice Mizer recorded their first concert video Sans Retour Voyage "Derniere" ~Encoure Une Fois~ here on April 1, 1997.
- P!nk played here on November 22, 2002.
- Miyavi held his first solo concert here in 2003.
- Daikoku Danji held their first Japanese concert here on March 20, 2012, which was released on DVD as Daikoku Danji Japan First Live 2012.
- Galneryus recorded their live video Reliving the Ironhearted Flag here on October 14, 2013.
- Band-Maid recorded their first live video Band-Maid World Domination Tour [Shinka] at Line Cube Shibuya here on February 14, 2020.

Preceded by Hibiya Public Hall	Host of the Japan Record Awards; 1967–1968	Succeeded by Imperial Garden Theater
