= The Golden Spoon =

2022 South Korean television series

- Promotional poster
- Hangul: 금수저
- Hanja: 金수箸
- RR: Geumsujeo
- MR: Kŭmsujŏ
- Genre: Coming-of-age; Mystery; Fantasy
- Created by: Studio N
- Based on: The Golden Spoon by HD3
- Developed by: Hong Seok-woo (MBC) (Planning)
- Written by: Kim Eun-hee; Yoon Eun-kyung
- Directed by: Song Hyun-wook
- Starring: Yook Sung-jae; Lee Jong-won; Jung Chae-yeon; Yeonwoo
- Music by: Tae-jeon
- Country of origin: South Korea
- Original language: Korean
- No. of episodes: 16

Production
- Executive producer: Kim bo-mi (CP)
- Producers: Ahn Je-hyeon; Shin Sang-yoon; Kwon Mi-kyung
- Editors: Seon Han-beum; Lee Ji-hyeon
- Production companies: Samhwa Networks; Studio N

Original release
- Network: MBC TV
- Release: September 23 – November 12, 2022

The Golden Spoon (Korean: 금수저; RR: Geumsujeo) is a South Korean television series directed by Song Hyun-wook, and starring Yook Sung-jae, Lee Jong-won, Jung Chae-yeon, and Yeonwoo. Based on Naver hit webtoon of the same name by HD3 which was published in 2016, the series depicts a life adventure of a youth who became an acquired gold spoon. It premiered on MBC TV on September 23, 2022, and aired every Friday and Saturday at 21:50 (KST). It is also available for streaming on Disney+ in selected regions.

== Synopsis ==
Lee Seung-cheon (Yook Sung-jae), a child born in a poor family, who changes fate with a friend who was born in a wealthy family through a golden spoon and becomes an acquired gold spoon.

== Cast ==
=== Main ===
- Yook Sung-jae as Lee Seung-cheon

A student who dreams of turning his life around with a golden spoon.

- Lee Jong-won as Hwang Tae-yong

He goes back and forth between the life of a gold spoon and a dirt spoon regardless of his will.

- Jung Chae-yeon as Na Joo-hee

The daughter of a conglomerate family, who has a sense of righteousness and candid charm.

- Yeonwoo as Oh Yeo-jin
  - Lee Go-eun as young Oh Yeo-jin

She has a pretty appearance and a bold personality, who grew up in a wealthy family.

=== Supporting ===
==== People around Lee Seung-cheon ====
- Choi Dae-chul as Lee Cheol

Lee Seung-cheon's father.

- Han Chae-ah as Jin Seon-hye

Lee Seung-cheon's mother.

- Moon Seung-you as Lee Seung-ah

Lee Seung-cheon's older sister.

==== People around Hwang Tae-yong ====
- Choi Won-young as Hwang Hyeon-do / Kwon Yo-han (real)

Hwang Tae-yong's father. His real identity was Kwon Yo-han, who used a golden spoon to switch places with the real Hwang Hyun-do to gain his wealth and business, and also killed the real Hyun-do thereafter

- Son Yeo-eun as Seo Young-shin

Hwang Tae-yong's stepmother.

- Chang Ryul as Seo Jun-tae

Seo Young-shin's younger brother and the leader of Amicus, a secret social club of gold spoons.

==== People around Na Joo-hee ====
- Son Jong-hak as Na Sang-guk

Na Joo-hee's father and UBS TV president. As a business owner, he values profit and loss. But above all, he loved his daughter the most.

==== Others ====
- Kim Kang-min as Park Jang-goon

He is the son of an army chief of staff with 200 billion won, and he has a bad taste to bully Lee Seung-cheon.

- Son Woo-hyeon as Jang Mun-ki

Hwang Tae-yong's bodyguard and driver.

- Kim Eun-soo as Lee Dong-kyung

A close friend of Lee Seung-cheon.

- Jo Deok-hoe as Park Jae-don

A lively and active person.

- Noh Sung-eun
- Lee In-hye as Writer Wang
- Song Ok-sook as Grandma Gem spoon
- Kim Seo-ha as Seong-won

The second generation of a conglomerate, Seo Jun-tae's friend, and a member of Amicus.

- Song Yoo-hyun as Kim Na-young

UBS TV President's House Custodian.

- Jung Soo-kyo as Byun PD

is the main PD of Document Notebook.

- Lee Dong-hee as Alex Boo

=== Special appearance ===
- Na In-woo as Han Sung-hoon, a gardener in Hwang Tae-yong's house.
- Kim Jae-chul as Hwang Hyeon-do (real), Hwang Tae-yong's biological father.

== Production ==
=== Casting ===
The main cast was confirmed on February 17, 2022.

=== Filming ===
On August 11, 2022, photos from the official script reading were published.

On September 12, 2022, it was confirmed by the agency that actress Jung Chae-yeon was diagnosed with a broken collarbone and was showing signs of trauma, and received emergency treatment while filming the drama.

She didn't attend the press conference for the drama on September 23 due to rehabilitation, and returned to filming on October 15, 2022.

== Viewership ==
The Golden Spoon : South Korea viewers per episode (thousands)

Season	Episode number																Average
Season	1	2	3	4	5	6	7	8	9	10	11	12	13	14	15	16	Average
1	958	1324	970	854	1068	892	1041	768	1329	1006	1276	778	1001	882	861	1090	1006

Source: Audience measurement performed nationwide by Nielsen Korea.

Ep.	Original broadcast date	Average audience share		
Ep.	Original broadcast date	Nielsen Korea		TNmS
Ep.	Original broadcast date	Nationwide	Seoul	Nationwide
1	September 23, 2022	5.4% (11th)	5.1% (10th)	5.0% (13th)
2	September 24, 2022	7.4% (4th)	6.9% (3rd)	5.9% (7th)
3	September 30, 2022	5.5% (10th)	5.4% (10th)	N/A
4	October 1, 2022	5.1% (8th)	4.5% (9th)	4.6% (13th)
5	October 7, 2022	5.9% (10th)	6.0% (8th)	4.7% (16th)
6	October 8, 2022	5.3% (7th)	5.3% (6th)	4.8% (12th)
7	October 14, 2022	6.1% (10th)	6.0% (10th)	6.1% (11th)
8	October 15, 2022	4.6% (14th)	4.1% (17th)	4.2% (19th)
9	October 21, 2022	7.8% (5th)	7.4% (4th)	5.9% (11th)
10	October 22, 2022	5.6% (6th)	5.3% (8th)	4.6% (17th)
11	October 28, 2022	7.8% (5th)	7.6% (3rd)	6.0% (11th)
12	October 29, 2022	4.7% (11th)	4.7% (12th)	3.6% (20th)
13	November 4, 2022 (Note: The broadcast will be delayed by an hour due to live broadcasts of KBO baseball and MBC news programs.)	5.5% (8th)	5.4% (8th)	4.6% (13th)
14	November 5, 2022	5.1% (8th)	4.9% (6th)	3.9% (16th)
15	November 11, 2022	5.2% (11th)	5.2% (9th)	N/A
16	November 12, 2022	6.0% (5th)	6.0% (4th)	5.4% (11th)
Average		5.8%	5.6%	— (Note: Due to some ratings not recorded, the exact average rating is unknown.)
In the table above, the blue numbers represent the lowest ratings and the red numbers represent the highest ratings.; N/A denotes that ratings were not released.

== Awards and nominations ==
Award ceremony	Year	Category	Nominee(s) / Work	Result
MBC Drama Awards	2022	Drama of the Year	The Golden Spoon	Nominated
MBC Drama Awards	2022	Top Excellence Award, Actor in a Miniseries	Yook Sung-jae	Won
MBC Drama Awards	2022	Excellence Award, Actress in a Miniseries	Jung Chae-yeon	Nominated
MBC Drama Awards	2022	Best Character Award	Choi Won-young	Won
MBC Drama Awards	2022	Best Couple Award	Yook Sung-jae and Jung Chae-yeon	Nominated
MBC Drama Awards	2022	Best Supporting Actor	Choi Dae-chul	Nominated
MBC Drama Awards	2022	Best Supporting Actress	Han Chae-ah	Nominated
MBC Drama Awards	2022	Best Supporting Actress	Son Yeo-eun	Nominated
MBC Drama Awards	2022	Best New Actor	Lee Jong-won	Won
MBC Drama Awards	2022	Best New Actress	Yeonwoo	Won
