= Valentine Fighter =

Single by The Boss

from the album On the Way
- A-side: "Valentine Fighter"
- B-side: "24×7"; "come back to me"
- Released: February 6, 2013 (Japan)
- Genre: J-pop
- Label: Sony Music Entertainment

The Boss singles chronology
"Honki Magic" (2012)	"Valentine Fighter" (2013)

Limited Edition cover
- Limited Edition A cover

Alternative cover
- Limited Edition B cover

"Valentine Fighter" (バレンタイン・ファイター) is the seventh Japanese single released by Korean boy group The Boss. It was scheduled to be released on February 6, 2013 on their Japanese label Sony Music Entertainment.

== Single information ==
The single will be available in three different versions, including two DVD editions and a CD only release. All releases come with the same track list including "Valentine Fighter", "24×7", and "Come Back to Me" as well as the instrumental of its title track. Limited Type A includes a DVD with the music video for "Valentine Fighter" and off shot footage. It comes with a deluxe booklet and will be shipped as a digipack release. Limited Type B will be joined with a special project movie. As with all previous releases, the CD only edition will feature one out of six trading cards.

== Track list ==
=== CD ===
No.	Title	Length
1.	"Valentine Fighter" (バレンタイン・ファイター)
2.	"24×7"
3.	"Come back to me"
4.	"Valentine Fighter -instrumental-" (バレンタイン・ファイター -instrumental-)

=== Limited edition A DVD ===
No.	Title	Length
1.	"Valentine Fighter Music Video" (バレンタイン・ファイター Music Video)
2.	"Making of Valentine Fighter Music Video"

=== Limited edition B DVD ===
No.	Title	Length
1.	"Special Project Movie"

== Charts ==
Chart	Peak position	Sales
Japan Oricon Daily Singles Chart	8	
Japan Oricon Weekly Singles Chart	10	11,794
Japan Oricon Monthly Singles Chart	36	12,129

== Release history ==
Country	Date	Format	Label
Japan	February 6, 2013	CD+DVD A SRCL-8212～8213; CD+DVD B SRCL-8214～8215; CD SRCL-8216	Sony Music Entertainment
