= Bang Geul-yi =

South Korean Director

- Born: May 14, 1987 (age 39); Seoul, South Korea
- Education: Ewha Womans University
- Occupation: Television Director
- Years active: 2014–present
- Employer: CJENM

Korean name
- Hangul: 방글이
- RR: Bang Geuli
- MR: Pang Kŭri

Bang Geul-yi (Korean: 방글이; born May 17, 1987) often known by her nickname Bang PD ("PD" is a commonly used term in Korean television that denotes "producer-director" or "production director") is a South Korean director. Bang is best known for directing Season 4 of the popular variety show 2 Days & 1 Night.

== Education ==
Bang was born in 1987 in Seoul as the daughter of a pastor. Bang graduated from Ewha Womans University, College of Social Sciences, Department of Public Administration.

== Career ==
Bang started her career in 2014 as a director at KBS. Bang worked on shows such as Crisis Escape No. 1, Happy Together and The Return of Superman. In 2015, she made a surprise appearance on KBS2's Entertainment Weekly. Later, she was appointed as the main director of Season 4 of 2 Days & 1 Night. This was the first time in 12 years that a female director became the main director of 2 Days & 1 Night.

On January 10, 2023, tvN announced through multiple media outlets that Bang is transferring to CJ ENM and will start working from February. Bang moved from KBS to tvN to try something new and to have the opportunity to direct new content. She praised tvN for being systematic and organized in creating and launching new programs, and for having a collaborative environment where many people think together to create innovative content.

Bang's first work on tvN was a travel variety show Expedition to Maya, starring actors Cha Seung-won, Kim Sung-kyun, and The Boyz's Ju-yeon. It was aired on tvN from August 4 to September 29, 2023, and available for streaming on domestic OTT Tving. In September 2024, Bang produced Iron Girls starring actors Jin Seo-yeon, Uee, Park Ju-hyun and Seol In-ah as well as Kim Dong-hyun challenging to participate in a triathlon.

== Filmography ==
=== Television series ===
Year	Title		Credited as			Ref.
Year	English	Korean	Assistant Director	Co-director	Director	Ref.
2014–2015	Crisis Escape No. 1	위기탈출 넘버원	Yes	No	No	
2015–2016	Happy Together	해피투게더	Yes	No	No	
2019	The Return of Superman	슈퍼맨이 돌아왔다	No	Yes	No	
2019–2022	2 Days & 1 Night (Season 4)	1박 2일 시즌 4	No	No	Yes	
2020	Music Bank	뮤직뱅크	No	No	Yes (Note: Directing every other week with Yang Hyuk PD)	
2022	Expedition to Maya	형따라 마야로	No	No	Yes	
2024–2026	Iron Girls (Season 1–3)	무쇠소녀단	No	No	Yes	

== Awards and nominations ==
Award	Year	Category	Recipient	Result	Ref
61st Baeksang Arts Awards	2025	Broadcast Performing Arts Award	Iron Girls	Nominated	
Brand Customer Loyalty Awards	2021	Weekend Variety Show	2 Days & 1 Night Season 4	Won	
19th KBS Entertainment Awards	2020	Viewers' Choice Best Program Award	2 Days & 1 Night Season 4	Won	
20th KBS Entertainment Awards	2021	Viewers' Choice Best Program Award	2 Days & 1 Night Season 4	Won	
21st KBS Entertainment Awards	2022	Viewers' Choice Best Program Award	2 Days & 1 Night Season 4	Nominated	
Korea Broadcasting Awards	2021	Best TV Picture Award	2 Days & 1 Night Season 4	Won	
