= Butterfly effect (disambiguation) =

The butterfly effect is a metaphor for sensitive dependence on initial conditions in chaos theory.

Butterfly effect may also refer to:

== Books ==
- Butterfly Effect, a collection of poetry by Harry Humes
- Murder in Maine: The Butterfly Effect, a novel by Mildred B. Davis and Katherine Roome

== Film and television ==
- El efecto mariposa, a 1995 Spanish film whose title translates to "The Butterfly Effect"
- The Butterfly Effect, a 2004 film, followed by two sequels
- "The Butterfly Effect", a chapter from the 2025 Indian film Dhurandhar
- "The Butterfly Effect" (Heroes), an episode of Heroes
- Two episodes of Ugly Betty:
  - "The Butterfly Effect Part 1"
  - "The Butterfly Effect Part 2 (Ugly Betty)"
- "Butterfly Effect" (Unforgettable), an episode of Unforgettable
- "Butterfly Effect", a first season episode of The Loud House
- "Butterfly Effect", a seventh season episode of My Hero Academia

== Music ==
- The Butterfly Effect (band), an Australian hard rock band
  - The Butterfly Effect (EP), a 2001 EP by the band
- Butterfly Effect (Ashley Roberts album), 2014
- Butterfly Effect, a 2020 album by Koven
- The Butterfly Effect (Moonspell album), 1999
- The Butterfly Effect, a 2009 album by Diana Yukawa
- Butterfly Effect (EP), an EP by Shontelle Sparkles, 2025
- "Butterfly Effect" (Shiritsu Ebisu Chugaku song), 2014
- "Butterfly Effect" (Sid song), 2017
- "Butterfly Effect" (Travis Scott song), 2017
- "Butterfly Effect", a song by Bolbbalgan4
- "Butterfly Effect", a song by Exo on the album Obsession
- "Butterfly Effect", a song by Sienna Spiro
- "Butterfly Effect", a song by VIXX on the album Hades

== See also ==
- Butterfly effect in popular culture
