= Numbers (South Korean TV series) =

2023 South Korean television series

- Promotional poster
- Hangul: 넘버스: 빌딩숲의 감시자들
- Hanja: 넘버스: 빌딩숲의 監視자들
- Lit.: Numbers: Watchers Over the Forest of Buildings
- RR: Neombeoseu: bildingsupui gamsijadeul
- MR: Nŏmbŏsŭ: pildingsup'ŭi kamsijadŭl
- Genre: Workplace; Action; Revenge drama; Romance
- Developed by: Hong Seok-woo (planning)
- Written by: Jung An; Oh Hye-seok
- Directed by: Kim Chil-bong
- Starring: Kim Myung-soo; Choi Jin-hyuk; Choi Min-soo; Yeonwoo; Kim Yoo-ri
- Music by: Gaemi
- Country of origin: South Korea
- Original language: Korean
- No. of episodes: 12

Production
- Executive producer: Shin Cheol
- Producers: Kim Young-seop; Jeon Sang-gyun; Kim Dong-jun; Lee Dae-yong; Lee Young-min
- Running time: 70 minutes
- Production companies: Tiger Studio; A2Z Entertainment

Original release
- Network: MBC TV
- Release: June 23 – July 29, 2023

Numbers (Korean: 넘버스: 빌딩숲의 감시자들) is a 2023 South Korean television series starring Kim Myung-soo, Choi Jin-hyuk, Choi Min-soo, Yeonwoo, and Kim Yoo-ri. It aired on MBC TV from June 23 to July 29, 2023, every Friday and Saturday at 21:50 (KST). It is also available for streaming on Wavve in South Korea, and on Viki and Viu in selected regions.

== Synopsis ==
Numbers tells the various stories that unfold within an accounting firm. It revolves around an accountant with a high school diploma, who fights against injustice.

== Cast ==
=== Main ===
- Kim Myung-soo as Jang Ho-woo: the first and only high school-educated accountant to join the Taeil Accounting Firm, one of the nation's four big accounting firms.
- Choi Jin-hyuk as Han Seung-jo: a senior manager at Taeil Accounting Firm who has a good family background and graduated from a prestigious university.
- Choi Min-soo as Han Je-gyun: Seung-jo's father who is the vice president of Taeil Accounting Firm.
- Yeonwoo as Jin Yeon-ah: a senior associate at Taeil Accounting Firm.
- Kim Yoo-ri as Jang Ji-soo / Joyce: Seung-jo's ex-girlfriend who is the manager of Hong Kong private equity fund C-level.

=== Supporting ===
==== Taeil Accounting Firm Deal Department ====
- Lee Sung-yeol as Shim Hyung-woo: director of the department.
- Choi Jung-woo as Yang Jae-hwan: a department manager.
- Park Hwan-hee as Son Hye-won: a senior associate.
- Seo Eun-woo as Eun Seok-min: a senior manager.
- Shin Woo-gyeom as Woo Sang-hyun: a department manager.
- Bae Geu-rin as Jung Si-young: a senior associate.
- Yang Jae-hyun as Do Ji-hoon: a new accountant.
- Park Kyung-soon as Wang Kyung-tae: a new accountant.

==== Taeil Accounting Firm Audit Department ====
- Kim Young-jae as Kang Hyun: a senior manager.
- Bae Hae-sun as Ahn Seung-yeon: vice president of the department.
- Han Gyu-won as Kim Jong-ok: a department manager.
- Kim Jung-joo as Park Dong-ho: a department manager.
- Seo Young-soo as Jo Byeong-guk: a senior associate.
- Choi Jung-woo as Yang Jae-hwan: a new accountant.
- Lee Ki-chang as Choi Kyung-il: a senior associate.

==== People around Ho-woo ====
- Do Yeon-jin as Song Yeo-jin: Ho-woo's childhood friend who is a police officer.
- Kim Sun-bin as Gong Hee-sam: Ho-woo's childhood friend and current housemate.
- Nam Myeong-ryeol as Jang In-ho: CEO of Haebit Construction.
- Seong Byung-sook as Ong Cheon-ja: Ho-woo's grandmother who is the owner of Pride Restaurant.

==== Sang-ah Group ====
- Jung Hae-kyun as Lee Chan-joo: the chairman of Sang-ah Group.
- Joo Byung-ha as Lee Bo-sung: Chan-joo's son.
- Jo Hee-bong as Chief Koo: the representative of People's Entertainment.

==== Jisan Bank ====
- Kang Shin-il as Jin Tae-soo: Yeon-ah's father who is the president of Jisan Bank.
- Kim Kyul as Jung Jae-gi: the director of Jisan Bank's review department.
- Son In-yong as Ma Hang-sik: the director of Jisan Bank's credit management department.

== Production ==
The series was tentatively titled Accounting Firm (회계법인; Hoegyebeobin).

== Viewership ==
Numbers : South Korea viewers per episode (thousands)

Season	Episode number											
Season	1	2	3	4	5	6	7	8	9	10	11	12
1	735	651	763	569	661	N/A	N/A	N/A	567	N/A	512	N/A

Source: Audience measurement performed nationwide by Nielsen Korea.

Average TV viewership ratings
Ep.	Original broadcast date	Average audience share		
Ep.	Original broadcast date	Nielsen Korea		TNmS
Ep.	Original broadcast date	Nationwide	Seoul	Nationwide
1	June 23, 2023	4.4% (10th)	4.4% (9th)	3.5% (17th)
2	June 24, 2023	4.0% (11th)	4.0% (9th)	N/A
3	June 30, 2023	4.7% (11th)	4.4% (9th)	3.7% (20th)
4	July 1, 2023	3.2% (18th)	3.0% (18th)	N/A
5	July 7, 2023	3.8% (15th)	3.6% (13th)	3.7% (16th)
6	July 8, 2023	3.2% (22nd)	3.2% (20th)	N/A
7	July 14, 2023	3.0% (23rd)	N/A	N/A
8	July 15, 2023	2.8% (30th)	N/A	N/A
9	July 21, 2023	3.3% (18th)	N/A	3.1% (17th)
10	July 22, 2023	2.4% (30th)	N/A	N/A
11	July 28, 2023	3.0% (17th)	3.0% (14th)	N/A
12	July 29, 2023	2.4% (29th)	N/A	N/A
Average		3.4%	— (Note: Due to multiple unpublished ratings, the exact average rating is unknown.)	—
In the table above, the blue numbers represent the lowest ratings and the red numbers represent the highest ratings.; N/A denotes ratings that were not published.

== Awards and nominations ==
Name of the award ceremony, year presented, category, nominee(s) of the award, and the result of the nomination
Award ceremony	Year	Category	Nominee / Work	Result	Ref.
MBC Drama Awards	2023	Best Character Award	Choi Min-soo	Nominated	
MBC Drama Awards	2023	Best New Actress	Do Yeon-jin	Nominated	
MBC Drama Awards	2023	Best Supporting Actress	Bae Hae-sun	Nominated	
MBC Drama Awards	2023	Excellence Award, Actress in a Miniseries	Yeonwoo	Nominated	
MBC Drama Awards	2023	Top Excellence Award, Actor in a Miniseries	Kim Myung-soo	Nominated	
