= Honki Magic =

Single by The Boss

from the album On the Way
- A-side: "Honki Magic"
- B-side: "Ikenai 1・2・3"; "Pretty Smile"
- Released: August 1, 2012 (Japan)
- Genre: J-pop
- Label: Sony Music Entertainment

The Boss singles chronology
| "Jumping" (2012) | "Honki Magic" (2012) | "Valentine Fighter" (2013) |

Limited Edition cover
- Limited Edition A cover

Alternative cover
- Limited Edition B cover

"Honki Magic" (本気Magic, "True Magic") is the sixth Japanese single released by Korean boy group The Boss. It was scheduled to be released on August 1, 2012, on their Japanese label Sony Music Entertainment. The single's B-side song "Ikenai 1・2・3" was already revealed to be featured in the upcoming movie Ai Ore!, which features member Karam.

== Single information ==
The title track, "Honki Magic", was produced by Japanese group Orange Range's Naoto and penned by his bandmate Hiroki.

The single is set to include its title track "Honki Magic", as well as b-sides "Ikenai 1・2・3" and "Pretty Smile". Along with these three new songs comes an instrumental of the single's title track. It will be released in three different versions, including a regular edition, limited edition A and limited edition B. Limited edition A includes a CD, a DVD and a booklet. Limited edition B includes a CD and a DVD. First press regular edition comes with a trading card randomly selected from six kinds and an event ticket (valid only in Japan).

== Track list ==
=== CD ===
| No. | Title | Length |
|---|---|---|
| 1. | "Honki Magic" (本気Magic) |
| 2. | "Ikenai 1・2・3" (いけない1・2・3) |
| 3. | "Pretty Smile" |
| 4. | "Honki Magic -instrumental-" (本気Magic -instrumental-) |

=== Limited edition A DVD ===
| No. | Title | Length |
|---|---|---|
| 1. | "Honki Magic Music Video" (本気Magic Music Video) |
| 2. | "Special Edition - Making & NG Shots" |

=== Limited edition B DVD ===
| No. | Title | Length |
|---|---|---|
| 1. | "Daikoku Danji no Kore Yatte Miyou! ～Summer Fight～" (大国男児のこれやってみよう！ ～Summer Fight～) |

== Charts ==
| Chart | Peak position | Sales |
|---|---|---|
| Japan Oricon Daily Singles Chart | 6 | |
| Japan Oricon Weekly Singles Chart | 7 | 18,176 |
| Billboard Japan Hot 100 | 35 | |

== Release history ==
| Country | Date | Format | Label |
|---|---|---|---|
| Japan | August 1, 2012 | CD+DVD A SRCL-8043～8044; CD+DVD B SRCL-8045～8046; CD SRCL-8047 | Sony Music Entertainment |
