= Iron Girls (TV program) =

South Korean television show

- Season 3 promotional poster
- Hangul: 무쇠소녀단
- RR: Musoe sonyeodan
- MR: Musoe sonyŏdan
- Genre: Reality show Triathlon; Boxing
- Directed by: Bang Geul-yi
- Starring: Kim Dong-hyun; Jin Seo-yeon (Season 1); Uee (Season 1-2); Park Ju-hyun (Season 1-2); Seol In-ah; Keum Sae-rok (Seasons 2-3); Han Ji-hyun (Season 3); Yeonwoo (Season 3)
- Country of origin: South Korea
- Original language: Korean
- No. of seasons: 3
- No. of episodes: 23

Production
- Production location: South Korea
- Running time: 90 minutes

Original release
- Network: tvN
- Release: September 7, 2024 – present

Iron Girls (Korean: 무쇠소녀단) is a South Korean television program featuring a group of actresses who take on athletic challenges; competing in a triathlon in season 1 (2024), boxing in season 2 (2025), and short-track speed skating in season 3 (2026). The program is produced by Bang Geul-yi.

The first season aired every Saturday at 17:50 (KST) from September 7 to November 16, 2024. The second season aired every Friday at 20:40 (KST) from July 11 to September 26, 2025. It is available for streaming outside South Korea on Viu.

The third season is set to premiere on Thursday, November 26, 2026, at 20:40 (KST).

== Overview ==
=== Season 1 ===
A group of actresses Jin Seo-yeon, Uee, Park Ju-hyun, and Seol In-ah train for 120 days under the guidance of Captain Kim Dong-hyun to complete an Olympic distance triathlon.

=== Season 2 ===
The second season returned with cast members Uee, Park Ju-hyun and Seol In-ah, together with Captain Kim Dong-hyun, along with new cast member Keum Sae-rok, as they take on a tougher challenge of 120 days of boxing training leading to real matches.

=== Season 3 ===
For the third season, Seol In-ah, Keum Sae-rok, and Captain Kim Dong-hyun are joined by newcomers Yeonwoo and Han Ji-hyun for short-track speed skating training, spending 150 days mastering on-ice techniques for competitive racing.

== Cast ==
=== Captain ===
- Kim Dong-hyun

=== Coach ===
==== Season 1 ====
- Jung You-in, swimming coach
- Yeon Je-seong, cycling coach
- Heo Min-ho, triathlon coach

==== Season 2 ====
- Kim Ji-hoon, boxing coach

==== Season 3 ====
- Kwak Yoon-gy, short track speed skating coach

=== Members ===
- Jin Seo-yeon (Season 1)
- Uee (Season 1-2)
- Seol In-ah
- Park Ju-hyun (Season 1-2)
- Keum Sae-rok (Season 2-3)
- Han Ji-hyun (Season 3)
- Yeonwoo (Season 3)

== Ratings ==
=== Season 1 (2024) ===
Ep.	Original broadcast date	Average audience share (Nielsen Korea)	
Ep.	Original broadcast date	Nationwide	Seoul
1	September 7, 2024	2.179%	2.061%
2	September 14, 2024	1.999%	1.989%
3	September 21, 2024	2.859%	2.838%
4	September 28, 2024	2.301%	2.577%
5	October 5, 2024	2.219%	2.235%
6	October 12, 2024	2.060%	2.256%
7	October 19, 2024	2.550%	2.452%
8	October 26, 2024	2.526%	2.630%
9	November 2, 2024	2.220%	2.127%
10	November 9, 2024	2.146%	2.390%
11	November 16, 2024	3.502%	3.571%
Average		2.415%	2.466%
In the table above, the blue numbers represent the lowest ratings and the red numbers represent the highest ratings.; This show airs on a cable channel/pay TV which normally has a relatively smaller audience compared to free-to-air TV/public broadcasters (KBS, SBS, MBC & EBS).

=== Season 2 (2025) ===
Ep.	Original broadcast date	Average audience share (Nielsen Korea)	
Ep.	Original broadcast date	Nationwide	Seoul
1	July 7, 2025	1.992%	2.101%
2	July 18, 2025	1.896%	1.983%
3	July 25, 2025	1.787%	1.706%
4	August 1, 2025	2.093%	2.491%
5	August 8, 2025	1.864%	1.878%
6	August 15, 2025	1.834%	1.554%
7	August 22, 2025	1.920%	1.850%
8	August 29, 2025	2.009%	2.170%
9	September 5, 2025	1.906%	1.802%
10	September 12, 2025	2.612%	2.635%
11	September 19, 2025	3.033%	2.516%
12	September 26, 2025	3.175%	3.210%
Average		2.177%	2.158%
In the table above, the blue numbers represent the lowest ratings and the red numbers represent the highest ratings.; This show airs on a cable channel/pay TV which normally has a relatively smaller audience compared to free-to-air TV/public broadcasters (KBS, SBS, MBC & EBS).

== Awards and nominations ==
Year	Award ceremony	Category	Nominee / Work	Result	Ref.
2025	61st Baeksang Arts Awards	Best Entertainment Program	Iron Girls	Nominated	
