= Love Phobia (TV series) =

2026 South Korean television series

- Promotional poster
- Hangul: 러브포비아
- RR: Reobeu pobia
- MR: Rŏbŭ p'obia
- Genre: Romantic comedy; Science fiction
- Written by: Lee Se-ryeong
- Directed by: Wang Hye-ryeong
- Starring: Yeonwoo; Kim Hyun-jin; Jo Yun-seo; Choi Byung-chan; Im Ji-eun
- Country of origin: South Korea
- Original language: Korean
- No. of episodes: 8

Production
- Production company: WeMad

Original release
- Network: U+ Mobile TV; Lifetime
- Release: February 19 – March 13, 2026

Love Phobia (Korean: 러브포비아) is a 2026 South Korean romantic comedy science fiction television series written by Lee Se-ryeong and directed by Wang Hye-ryeong. The series centers on Yoon Bi-a (Yeonwoo), a CEO who's swapped human connection for AI comfort, and Han Seon-ho (Kim Hyun-jin) a hopelessly romantic novelist, as mysterious secrets unravel around them. It also stars Jo Yun-seo, Choi Byung-chan, and Im Ji-eun. It premiered on U+ Mobile TV on February 19, 2026, and airs every Thursday and Friday at 23:00 (KST). It is also available for streaming on Viu.

== Synopsis ==
Yoon Bi-a, the CEO of the AI dating app "It's You", is haunted by a trauma that limits her connections to under an hour. Trapped in her own emotional storm, she pours her energy into developing a generative AI dating app with her trusted friend Jae-hee by her side. Han Seon-ho, South Korea's hottest author, sells out every book launch, but behind his idol-like charm lies a hidden pain. Bi-a's arrival sparks a life-altering crisis, leading Seon-ho to join "It's You" and flip his world upside down.

== Cast and characters ==
=== Main ===
- Yeonwoo as Yoon Bi-a

the CEO of the AI dating app "It's You"

- Kim Hyun-jin as Han Seon-ho

Hottest author and Baek-ho's twin brother

- Jo Yun-seo as Seol Jae-hee

Bi-a's best friend.

- Choi Byung-chan as Han Baek-ho

Seon-ho's twin brother, who is the head of HAN Agency.

- Im Ji-eun as Yang Sun-ae

Bi-a's mother.

=== Supporting ===
- Lee Ji-hae as Song Ji-young
- Kim Ki-nam as Kim Kyung-tae
- Han Kyu-min as Kang San
- Hwang Ha-jung as Hong Ju-yeon
- Kim So-ha as Shin Yoo-kyung

== Production ==
Wang Hye-ryeong, who helmed Season of Blossom (2022) and Let Me Off the Earth (2020–2021), was attached to direct, and the screenplay is written by Lee Se-ryeong, who wrote Please, Summer (2020). The production is handled by WeMad.

In April 2025, Kim Hyun-jin, Yeonwoo, Jo Yun-seo, and Choi Byung-chan were confirmed to lead the series. The next month, Im Ji-eun, Lee Ji-hae, Kim Ki-nam, Han Kyu-min, Hwang Ha-jung, and Kim So-ha were confirmed to appear as the supporting role.

== Release ==
The release of Love Phobia was originally scheduled to premiere on U+ Mobile TV in June 2025, but was postponed. By January 2026, the series was confirmed to premiere on the platform and Lifetime on February 19, 2026, at 23:00 (KST). It is also available for streaming on Viu.
