= Yeonwoo =

South Korean actress (born 1996)

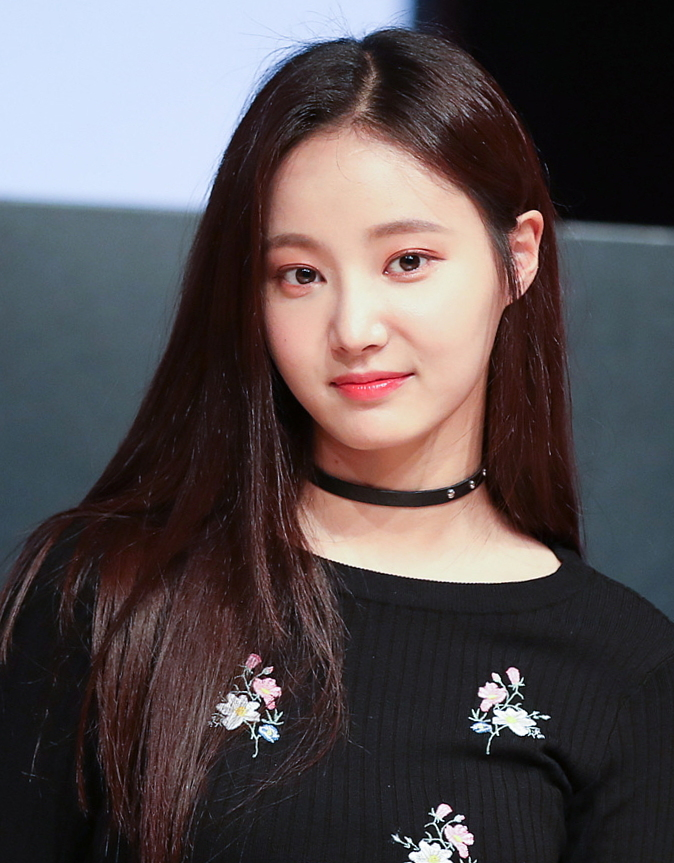
- Yeonwoo in May 2018
- Born: Lee Da-bin; August 1, 1996 (age 30); Chungju, South Korea
- Education: School of Performing Arts Seoul – Department of Acting
- Occupations: Actress; singer
- Years active: 2016–present
- Agent: 9ato Entertainment
- Musical career
- Genres: K-pop; electropop
- Instrument: Vocals
- Years active: 2016–2019
- Label: MLD
- Formerly of: Momoland

Korean name
- Hangul: 이다빈
- Hanja: 李多斌
- RR: I Dabin
- MR: I Tabin

Stage name
- Hangul: 연우
- Hanja: 妍雨
- RR: Yeonu
- MR: Yŏnu

Lee Da-bin (Korean: 이다빈; born August 1, 1996), known professionally as Yeonwoo (연우), is a South Korean actress and singer managed by 9ato Entertainment. She is a former member of the South Korean girl group Momoland. She is currently active as an actress, best known for her roles in the television series including Pegasus Market (2019), Touch (2020), Cheat on Me If You Can (2020), The Golden Spoon (2022), Numbers (2023), Dog Knows Everything (2024) and The Tale of Lady Ok (2024–2025).

== Early life ==
Yeonwoo was born on August 1, 1996, in Chungju, South Korea. She graduated from School of Performing Arts Seoul, focusing on Acting.

== Career ==
=== 2016–2019: Finding Momoland, debut with Momoland and departure ===
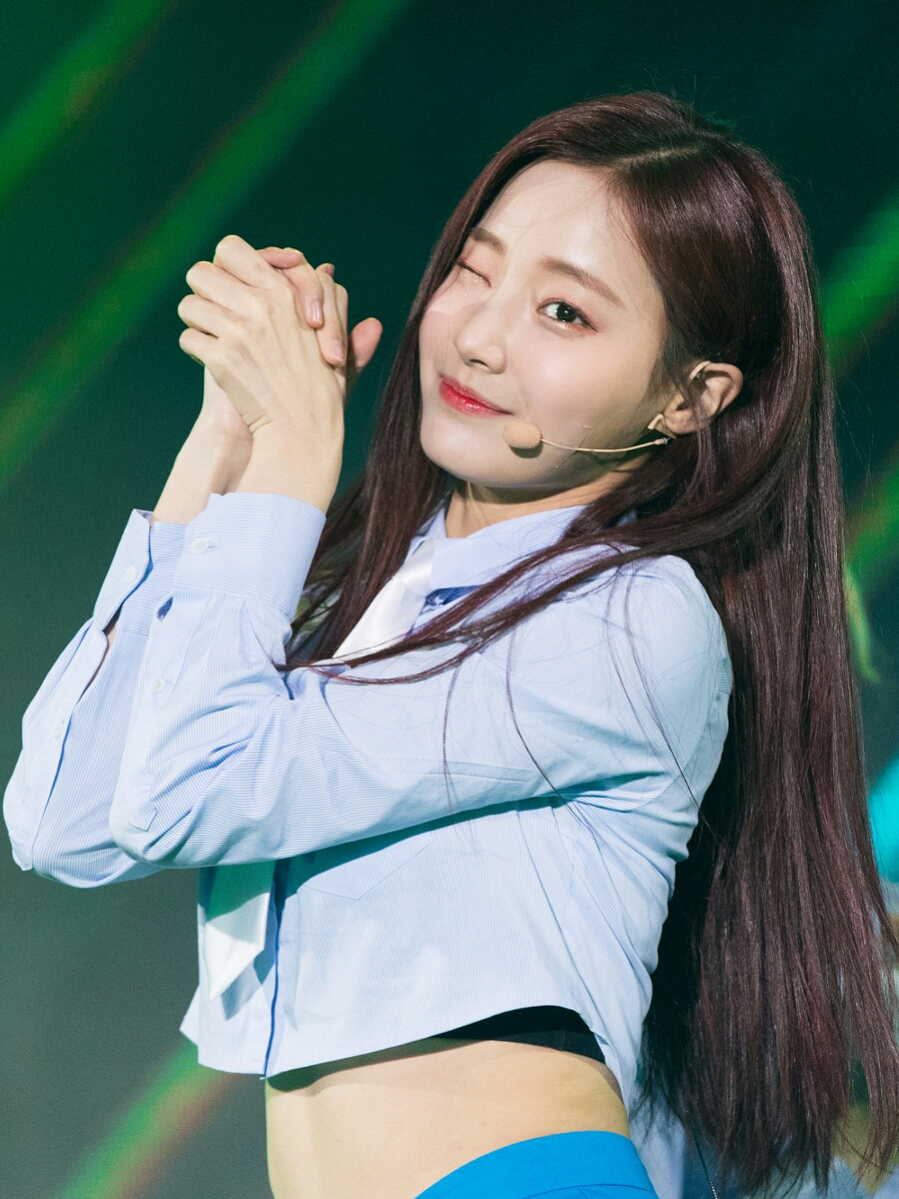
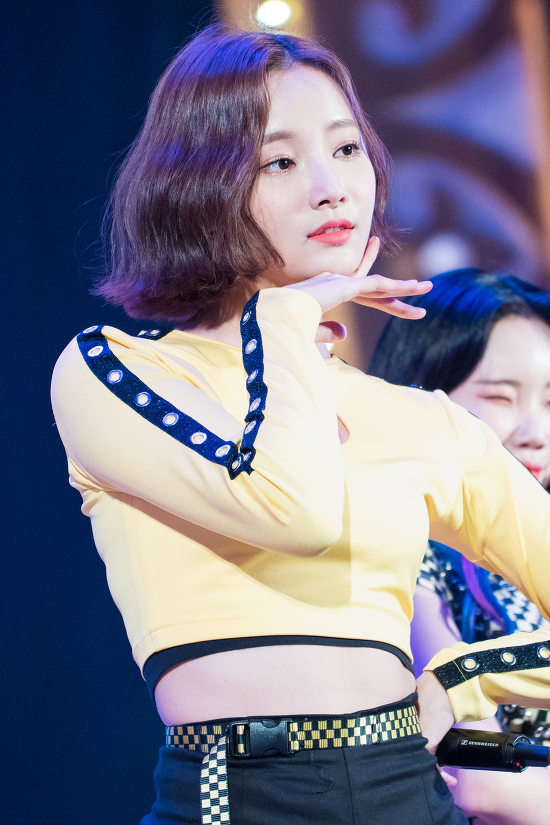
Yeonwoo in 2018 and 2019

On July 15, 2016, Yeonwoo became a contestant on Mnet's reality survival show Finding Momoland to select the members of MLD Entertainment's new girl group Momoland. She finished the competition in fifth place and officially debuted in Momoland on November 10, 2016, with the mini-album Welcome to Momoland. Yeonwoo made her acting debut in the second season of Happy Talk. On February 23, 2018, Yeonwoo made her special appearance in the MBC TV drama Tempted, where she played a role as Woo Do-hwan's cousin. On July 31, 2019, Yeonwoo joined in the webtoon-based comedy drama Pegasus Market. On November 30, Yeonwoo departed from Momoland to focus on acting activities, while remaining with the agency.

=== 2020–present: Acting career ===
Following her departure from the group, Yeonwoo confirmed to join the Channel A romantic comedy series Touch. She was also cast in several dramas including Alice (2020), Live On (2020–2021), and Cheat on Me If You Can (2020–2021) and Dali & Cocky Prince (2021).

On January 19, 2022, it was announced that Yeonwoo signed an exclusive contract with 9ato Entertainment. The same day, Yeonwoo starred in the fantasy drama The Golden Spoon, where she received Best New Actress Award at the 2022 MBC Drama Awards.

On February 16, 2023, Yeonwoo starred in a workplace drama Numbers. On August 9, she contributed the soundtrack "To You" (그대에게) for MBC TV television series My Dearest. On January 22, 2024, she was cast in a black comedy series Bitter Sweet Hell. On June 11, Yeonwoo was confirmed to be cast alongside Lim Ji-yeon, Choo Young-woo and Kim Jae-won in the JTBC historical drama The Tale of Lady Ok. On August 8, Yeonwoo joins the cast in the mystery sitcom Dog Knows Everything, where she received Excellence Award, Actress in a Miniseries at the 2024 KBS Drama Awards.

On April 23, 2025, Yeonwoo made her first leading role in the U+ Mobile TV romantic comedy sci-fi web series Love Phobia as Yoon Bi-a, a CEO of an AI dating app. On December 12, Yeonwoo participated in the Riot Games tournament Teamfight Tactics (TFT) at the TFT Paris Open event. On May 21, 2026, Yeonwoo cast in the third season of Iron Girls alongside Keum Sae-rok, Seol In-ah and Han Ji-hyun.

== Discography ==
=== Soundtrack appearances ===
List of soundtrack appearances, showing year released and album name
Title	Year	Album
"To You" (그대에게)	2023	My Dearest OST Part 2

== Filmography ==
=== Television series ===
Year	Title	Role	Notes	Ref.
2017	The Liar and His Lover	Girl group member	Cameo (ep. 6)	
2018	Tempted	Kwon Yeo-min	Cameo (ep. 3)	
2019	Pegasus Market	Kwon Ji-na		
2020	Touch	Jeong Yeong-ah		
2020	Alice	Yoon Tae-yeon		
2020–2021	Live On	Kang Jae-yi		
2020–2021	Cheat on Me If You Can	Go Mi-rae		
2021	Dali & Cocky Prince	Ahn Chak-hee		
2022	The Golden Spoon	Oh Yeo-jin		
2023	Numbers	Jin Yeon-ah		
2024	Bitter Sweet Hell	Lee Se-na		
2024	Dog Knows Everything	Hong Cho-won	Sitcom	
2024–2025	The Tale of Lady Ok	Cha Mi-ryeong / Baek Sun-hee		
2026	My Bias, My Boss	Han Jeong-yeon	Special appearance	
2026	Love in Disguise	Lee Hye-jung		

=== Web series ===
Year	Title	Role	Notes	Ref.
2017–2018	Happy Talk	Yun-woo	Season 2	
2026	Love Phobia	Yoon Bi-a		

=== Television shows ===
Year	Title	Role	Notes	Ref.
2016	Finding Momoland	Contestant	Finished 5th	
2017	The Show	Host	Season 5	
2017	The Beauty	Host		
2018	Song Ji-Hyo's Beautiful Life	Host		
2018	Law of the Jungle in Last Indian Ocean	Cast member	Episode 340–343	
2025	2025 Korea Grand Music Awards	Presenter	Artist Day (November 14)	
2026	Iron Girls	Cast member	Season 3	

== Awards and nominations ==
Name of the award ceremony, year presented, category, nominee of the award, and the result of the nomination
Award ceremony	Year	Category	Nominee / Work	Result	Ref.
KBS Drama Awards	2024	Excellence Award, Actress in a Miniseries	Dog Knows Everything	Won	
KBS Drama Awards	2024	Best Couple Award (with Lee Soon-jae and Ari)	Dog Knows Everything	Won	
KBS Drama Awards	2024	Popularity Award, Actress	Dog Knows Everything	Nominated	
MBC Drama Awards	2022	Best New Actress	The Golden Spoon	Won	
MBC Drama Awards	2023	Excellence Award, Actress in a Miniseries	Numbers	Nominated	
MBC Drama Awards	2024	Excellence Award, Actress in a Miniseries	Bitter Sweet Hell	Nominated	
