= Mildred B. Davis =

American novelist

Mildred B. Davis is an American novelist whose books generally fall into the suspense/mystery genre. Katherine (née Davis) Roome, her daughter, and a published author herself, helped Mildred break a 30-year publishing silence by working with her to turn some previously unpublished manuscripts into the Murder in Maine series. The third book of this series, however, was written by Mildred quite recently.

== Works ==
- 1948 - The Room Upstairs (Edgar Award for Best First Novel, presented by the Mystery Writers of America)
- 1953 - They Buried a Man
- 1954 - Suicide Hour (a Novella)
- 1955 - The Dark Place
- 1964 - The Voice on the Telephone
- 1966 - The Sound of Insects
- 1967 - Strange Corner
- 1967 - Walk Into Yesterday (aka Nightmare of Murder)
- 1969 - The Third Half
- 1971 - Three Minutes to Midnight
- 1974 - The Invisible Boarder
- 1975 - Tell Them What's-Her-Name Called
- 1977 - Scorpion
- 1977 - Lucifer Land (with Katherine Davis) (Katherine is the primary author. This is an historical drama based on an actual diary.)
- 2006 - Murder in Maine: The Avenging of Nevah Wright (with Katherine Roome)
- 2007 - Murder in Maine: The Fly Man Murders (with Katherine Roome)
- 2008 - Murder in Maine: The Butterfly Effect (with Katherine Roome) (sequel to Murder in Maine: The Avenging of Nevah Wright)
