= On the Way (The Boss album) =

Studio album by The Boss
- Released: March 13, 2013
- Genre: J-pop
- Label: Sony Music Entertainment

The Boss chronology
Love Letters (2012)	On the Way (2013)

Alternative Cover
- Limited Edition cover

Singles from On The Way
- 1. "Jumping" Released: March 28, 2012; 2. "Honki Magic" Released: August 1, 2012; 3. "Valentine Fighter" Released: February 6, 2013

On the Way is the second Japanese studio album by Korean boy group The Boss, released on March 13, 2013 on the Japanese label Sony Music Entertainment.

== Album information ==
The album was released in two different versions, including a regular edition and a limited edition. The limited edition comes with a special digipack with booklet, a CD including the same 12-song track list as the regular edition, as well as a DVD including the music video for the lead track and its offshoot. The regular edition comes with a CD and a trading card randomly selected from 6 types.

== Track listing ==
=== CD ===
No.	Title	Length
1.	"Jumping"
2.	"Honki Magic" (本気Magic)
3.	"Yume Made Ato..." (夢まであと・・・)
4.	"Thank You for Your Kindness"
5.	"Valentine Fighter" (バレンタイン・ファイター)
6.	"Yellow" (イエロー)
7.	"White Love"
8.	"24×7"
9.	"Blue Sky"
10.	"Ikenai 1・2・3" (いけない1・2・3)
11.	"Beautiful Days"
12.	"Someday"

=== DVD ===
No.	Title	Length
1.	"Yume Made Ato..." (夢まであと..; music video special edition ?ぼくらの道?)

== Charts ==
Chart	Peak position	Sales
Japan Oricon Daily Albums Chart	8	
Japan Oricon Weekly Albums Chart	16	7,624

== Release history ==
Country	Date	Format	Label
Japan	March 13, 2013	CD+DVD SRCL-8250～8251; CD SRCL-8252	Sony Music Entertainment
