= Jumping (The Boss song) =

Single by The Boss

from the album On the Way
- A-side: "Jumping"
- B-side: "Someday"; "Promise"
- Released: March 28, 2012 (Japan)
- Genre: J-pop
- Label: Sony Music Entertainment
- Songwriter(s): H.U.B, Akio Shimizu, Yoshimasa Kawabata

The Boss singles chronology
"Love Days" (2011)	"Jumping" (2012)	"Honki Magic" (2012)

Limited Edition cover
- Limited Edition A cover

Alternative cover
- Limited Edition B cover

"Jumping" is the fifth Japanese single released by Korean boy group The Boss. It was released on March 28, 2012 on their Japanese label Sony Music Entertainment.

== Single information ==
Diverting from songs such as those in their "Love Series", the group embarks on a "2nd Stage" with the upcoming release of "Jumping", taking on a more mature look and feel through the concept pictures as well as the full song. The new single's title track was described as a mellow, light rock and dance tune. It will be available for ringtone download starting March 7, after which the full song will be available to download starting March 21. The music video for the new single was already revealed through the Japanese YouTube channel of Sony Records, but is currently only available for Japanese residents.

The single was released in three different versions, including a regular edition, limited edition A and limited edition B. The regular edition includes "Jumping" and its instrumental, as well as its B-sides "Someday" and "Promise". Limited edition A comes with the same CD, as well as a DVD which has the music video for the title track and the making of. Limited edition B has an extra DVD including live footage of one of the "Love Letters" events. First press regular edition releases are filled with trading cards, one out of six in each release.

== Track list ==
=== CD ===
No.	Title	Lyrics	Music	Length
1.	"Jumping"	H.U.B	Akio Shimizu, Yoshimasa Kawabata	5:07
2.	"Someday"	Yuka Kawamura	Yuka Kawamura, Yuuki Kimura	5:24
3.	"Promise"	Mona	Kazunori Fujimoto	4:43
4.	"Jumping -instrumental-"			5:05
Total length:				20:20

=== Limited edition A DVD ===
No.	Title	Length
1.	"Jumping Music Video"
2.	"Making of Jumping Music Video"

=== Limited edition B DVD ===
No.	Title	Length
1.	"Daikoku Danji 1st ALBUM Release Event "Love Promise Event" Footage Document" (大国男児1st ALBUMリリースイベント『Love約束会』密着ドキュメント)

== Charts ==
Chart (2011)	Peak position	Sales
Japan Oricon Daily Singles Chart	3	7,864
Japan Oricon Weekly Singles Chart	5	16,975
Japan Oricon Monthly Singles Chart	38	17,597

== Release history ==
Country	Date	Format	Label
Japan	March 28, 2012	CD+DVD A SRCL-7924～7925; CD+DVD B SRCL-7926～7927; CD SRCL-7928	Sony Music Entertainment
