= Love Power (The Boss song) =

Single by The Boss

from the album Love Letters
- Released: April 13, 2011 (Japan)
- Genre: J-pop
- Label: Sony Music Entertainment
- Songwriter(s): H.U.B, Mitsuki Shiokawa

The Boss singles chronology
"Love Power" (2011)	"Love Bingo!" (2011)

Limited Edition cover
- Limited Edition A cover

Alternative cover
- Limited Edition B cover

"Love Power" is the Japanese debut single of Korean boy group The Boss, released on April 13, 2011 on their Japanese label Sony Music Entertainment.

== Single information ==
The single was released in three different versions, including a regular edition, limited edition A and limited edition B. The limited edition A comes with a CD including the same four songs as the regular edition, a deluxe booklet and a DVD. Limited edition B will include a bonus track, but the booklet will not be included. The first set of fans to purchase the regular edition of the single will also receive a pocket calendar.

== Track listing ==
=== Regular edition / Limited edition A CD ===
No.	Title	Lyrics	Music	Length
1.	"Love Power"	H.U.B	Mitsuki Shiokawa	3:43
2.	"Ubaitai Ima sugu ni" (奪いたい今すぐに)	H.U.B	Manaboon	4:12
3.	"Mō Saigo ni Naru to..." (もう最後になると…)	Canna	Kazunori Fujimoto, Sho Hayama, Alka-Line	5:44
4.	"Love Power -instrumental-"			3:43
Total length:				17:23

=== Limited edition B CD ===
No.	Title	Lyrics	Music	Length
1.	"Love Power"	H.U.B	Mitsuki Shiokawa	3:43
2.	"Ubaitai Ima sugu ni" (奪いたい今すぐに)	H.U.B	Manaboon	4:12
3.	"Mō Saigo ni Naru to..." (もう最後になると…)	Canna	Kazunori Fujimoto, Sho Hayama, Alka-Line	5:44
4.	"Mada Minu Sono Saki e" (まだ見ぬその未来へ)	canna	Shusui, Seito Motoyama, Shinichiro Murayama	3:43
5.	"Love Power -instrumental-"			3:43
Total length:				21:05

=== Limited edition A DVD ===
No.	Title	Length
1.	"Love Power Music Video -Special Edition-"
2.	"Making Of Love Power Music Video"

== Charts ==
Chart (2011)	Peak position	Sales
Japan Oricon Daily Singles Chart	6	
Japan Oricon Weekly Singles Chart	9	9,954
Japan Oricon Monthly Singles Chart	30	12,136

== Release history ==
Country	Date	Format	Label
Japan	April 13, 2011	CD+DVD A SRCL-7576～7577; CD B SRCL-7578; CD SRCL-7579	Sony Music Entertainment
