= Love Letters (The Boss album) =

Studio album by The Boss
- Released: February 22, 2012
- Genre: J-pop
- Label: Sony Music Entertainment

The Boss chronology
Love Letters (2012)	On the Way (2013)

Alternative Cover
- Limited Edition A cover

Alternative cover
- Limited Edition B cover

Singles from Love Letters
- 1. "Love Power" Released: April 13, 2011; 2. "Love Bingo!" Released: June 15, 2011; 3. "Love Parade" Released: September 21, 2011; 4. "Love Days" Released: December 7, 2011

Love Letters is the first Japanese studio album by Korean boy group The Boss, released on January 18, 2012 on the Japanese label Sony Music Entertainment.

== Background and release ==
This full album follows the group's previous Japanese singles in the "Love Series", being another title using the word "Love". The previously released singles “Love Power”, “Love Bingo!”, “Love Parade” and the more recent “Love Days”, were included in the album’s track list.

== Album information ==
The album was released in three different versions, including a regular edition, limited edition A and limited edition B. While the limited edition A comes with a 60-page photobook, a CD including the same 12-song track list as the regular edition, as well as a DVD including the "Documentary of Daikokudanji: First Story", the limited edition B only includes eight tracks.

== Track listing ==
=== Regular edition / Limited edition A CD ===
No.	Title	Lyrics	Music	Length
1.	"Love Power"	H.U.B	Mitsuki Shiokawa	3:43
2.	"Love Story"	H.U.B	Kazunori Fujimoto	4:50
3.	"Love Days"	Sho Kiryuin	Sho Kiryuin	4:08
4.	"Love Parade"	Chokkyu Murano	Minoru Komorita, Chokkaku	4:11
5.	"Friends"	H.U.B	Ken for 2 Soul Music, Inc., June (Wazz Up)	5:11
6.	"Kataomoi" (片思い)	H.U.B	Uta	4:43
7.	"Mō Saigo ni Naru to..." (もう最後になると…)	Canna	Kazunori Fujimoto, Sho Hayama, Alka-Line	5:44
8.	"Love song for you"	H.U.B	Shingo.S	4:22
9.	"Love Bingo!"	Kaori Morikawa	Ken for 2 Soul Music, Inc.	4:16
10.	"Hanarenai Hanasanai" (離れない離さない)	H.U.B	Shinichiro Murayama	4:05
11.	"Dearest"	Yuka Kawamura	Yuka Kawamura, Chokkaku	4:52
12.	"Magic"	Kiyoshi	Cube Juice, Chokkaku	3:58
Total length:				54:09

=== Limited edition B CD ===
No.	Title	Lyrics	Music	Length
1.	"Love Power"	H.U.B	Mitsuki Shiokawa	3:43
2.	"Love Story"	H.U.B	Kazunori Fujimoto	4:50
3.	"Love Bingo!"	Kaori Morikawa	Ken for 2 Soul Music, Inc.	4:16
4.	"Kataomoi" (片思い)	H.U.B	Uta	4:43
5.	"Mō Saigo ni Naru to..." (もう最後になると…)	canna	Kazunori Fujimoto, Sho Hayama, Alka-Line	5:44
6.	"Love song for you"	H.U.B	Shingo.S	4:22
7.	"Dearest"	Yuka Kawamura	Yuka Kawamura, Chokkaku	4:52
8.	"Magic"	Kiyoshi	Cube Juice, Chokkaku	3:58
Total length:				36:32

=== Limited edition A DVD ===
No.	Title	Length
1.	"Documentary of Daikokudanji: First Story"	19:56
Total length:		19:56

== Chart performance ==
Chart (2012)	Peak position	Sales
Japan Oricon Weekly Albums Chart	7	14,379

== Release history ==
Country	Date	Format	Label
Japan	January 18, 2012	CD+DVD A SRCL-7836～7837; CD B SRCL-7838; CD SRCL-7839	Sony Music Entertainment
