= Love Bingo! =

Single by The Boss

from the album Love Letters
- A-side: "Love Bingo!"
- B-side: "Magic"; "Natsu no Kioku"
- Released: June 15, 2011 (Japan)
- Genre: J-pop
- Label: Sony Music Entertainment

The Boss singles chronology
"Love Power" (2011)	"Love Bingo!" (2011)	"Love Parade" (2011)

Limited Edition cover
- Limited Edition A cover

Alternative cover
- Limited Edition B cover

"Love Bingo!" is the second Japanese single released by Korean boy group The Boss. It was released on June 15, 2011, on the Japanese label Sony Music Entertainment.

== Single information ==
The single was released in three different versions, including a regular edition, limited edition A and limited edition B. Limited edition A includes a CD, a DVD and a booklet while limited edition B includes a CD and a DVD. Regular edition comes with a CD and a random trading photo.

== Track list ==
=== CD ===
No.	Title	Lyrics	Music	Length
1.	"Love Bingo!"	Kaori Morikawa	Ken for 2 Soul Music, Inc.	4:17
2.	"Magic"	Kiyoshi	Cube Juice, Chokkaku	4:00
3.	"Natsu no Kioku" (夏の記憶)	Hidefusa Iwata	Motoi Okuda, Wataru Maeguchi	5:04
4.	"Love Bingo! -instrumental-"			4:15
Total length:				17:37

=== Limited edition A DVD ===
No.	Title	Length
1.	"Love Bingo! Music Video Special Edition"
2.	"Making Of Love Bingo! Music Video"

=== Limited edition B DVD ===
No.	Title	Length
1.	"Love Bingo! Dance Lesson Video"	8:37
Total length:		8:37

== Chart performance ==
Chart (2011)	Peak position	Sales
Japan Oricon Daily Singles Chart	7	
Japan Oricon Weekly Singles Chart	11	14,202

== Release history ==
Country	Date	Format	Label
Japan	June 15, 2011	CD+DVD A SRCL-7657～7658; CD+DVD B SRCL-7669～7660; CD SRCL-7661	Sony Music Entertainment
