= Love Parade (The Boss song) =

Single by The Boss

from the album Love Letters
- A-side: "Love Parade"
- B-side: "Girlfriend"; "Wasurenai"
- Released: September 21, 2011 (Japan)
- Genre: J-pop
- Label: Sony Music Entertainment
- Songwriters: Chokkyu Murano, Minoru Komorita

The Boss singles chronology
"Love Bingo!" (2011)	"Love Parade" (2011)	"Love Days" (2011)

Limited Edition cover
- Limited Edition A cover

Alternative cover
- Limited Edition B cover

"Love Parade" is the third Japanese single released by Korean boy group The Boss, originally intended as the last of their "Love Series". It was released on September 21, 2011 on their Japanese label Sony Music Entertainment. The single's B-side, "Girlfriend", was featured as the ending theme of the show Guru Guru Ninety Nine, which features a lot of different Japanese artists and has been running for many years. It was the show's fixed theme song from July 2011 until September 2011.

== Single information ==
The single was released in three different versions, including a regular edition, limited edition A and limited edition B. Limited edition A includes a CD, a DVD and a booklet while limited edition B includes a CD and a DVD. First press regular edition releases are filled with trading cards, one out of six in each release.

== Track list ==
=== CD ===
No.	Title	Lyrics	Music	Length
1.	"Love Parade"	Chokkyu Murano	Minoru Komorita, Chokkaku	4:11
2.	"Girlfriend (NTV show Guru Guru Ninety Nine ending theme)" (Girlfriend（日本テレビ系「ぐるぐるナインティナイン」エンディングテーマ）)	Yusuke Toriumi	Kana Yabuki, Shinichiro Murayama	5:05
3.	"Wasurenai" (わすれない)	canna	Shusui, Seiji Motoyama	5:14
4.	"Love Parade -instrumental-"			4:10
Total length:				18:42

=== Limited edition A DVD ===
No.	Title	Length
1.	"Love Parade Music Video"
2.	"Making Of Love Parade Music Video"

=== Limited edition B DVD ===
No.	Title	Length
1.	"Roots of Daikoku-danji: Daikoku Danji ga Umareta Basho" (Roots Of DAIKOKU-DANJI ~大国男児が生まれた場所~)	10:31
Total length:		10:31

== Charts ==
Chart (2011)	Peak position	Sales
Japan Oricon Daily Singles Chart	6	
Japan Oricon Weekly Singles Chart	8	18,386
Japan Oricon Monthly Singles Chart	26	

== Release history ==
Country	Date	Format	Label
Japan	September 21, 2011	CD+DVD A SRCL-7731～7732; CD+DVD B SRCL-7733～7734; CD SRCL-7735	Sony Music Entertainment
