= Love Days =

Single by The Boss

from the album Love Letters
- A-side: "Love Days"
- B-side: "Taiyō ga Noboru Basho"; "Futari no Suki na Akanezora"
- Released: December 7, 2011 (Japan)
- Genre: J-pop
- Label: Sony Music Entertainment
- Songwriter: Sho Kiryuin

The Boss singles chronology
"Love Parade" (2011)	"Love Days" (2011)	"Jumping" (2012)

Limited Edition cover
- Limited Edition A cover

Alternative cover
- Limited Edition B cover

"Love Days" is the fourth Japanese single released by Korean boy group The Boss, continuing their "Love Series" trend. It was released on December 7, 2011, on their Japanese label Sony Music Entertainment.

The title song is written by Kiryuin Sho of the band Golden Bomber; he later recorded his own cover version of it, which was released as a digital single on November 2, 2018 and included in his album Kojin Shisan, released on December 5, 2018.

== Single information ==
The title track, "Love Days", was featured as the ending theme of the show Geino Bang+ in December 2011. The second track on the single, "Taiyō ga Noboru Basho", is an up-tempo song, while the third track included "Futari no Suki na Akanezora".

The single was released in three different versions, including a regular edition, limited edition A and limited edition B. Limited edition A includes a CD, a DVD and a booklet. Limited edition B includes a CD and a DVD with a special video about the group's life in Japan. First press regular edition releases are filled with trading cards, one out of six in each release.

== Track list ==
=== CD ===
No.	Title	Lyrics	Music	Length
1.	"Love Days" (NTV show Geino Bang+ December Ending Theme)	Sho Kiryuin	Sho Kiryuin	4:09
2.	"Taiyō ga Noboru Basho" (太陽が昇る場所)	H.U.B	Butterfly Effect	3:57
3.	"Futari no Suki na Akanezora" (二人の好きな茜空)	Canna	Kazunori Fujimoto	5:06
4.	"Love Days -instrumental-"			4:07
Total length:				17:21

=== Limited edition A DVD ===
No.	Title	Length
1.	"Love Days Music Video"
2.	"Making Of Love Days"

=== Limited edition B DVD ===
No.	Title	Length
1.	"Kore! Yatte miyō!" (これ！やってみよう！)	10:20
Total length:		10:20

== Chart performance ==
Chart (2011)	Peak position	Sales
Japan Oricon Daily Singles Chart	7	
Japan Oricon Weekly Singles Chart	7	17,758
Japan Oricon Monthly Singles Chart	40	18,950

== Release history ==
Country	Date	Format	Label
Japan	December 7, 2011	CD+DVD A SRCL-7825～7826; CD+DVD B SRCL-7827～7828; CD SRCL-7829	Sony Music Entertainment
