= The Boss (band) =

South Korean boy band

- Also known as: Dae Guk Nam Ah; DGNA (대국남아); Daikoku Danji (大国男児)
- Origin: Seoul, South Korea
- Genres: A cappella; pop
- Years active: 2010–2022
- Labels: Open World; POOM; XING; Sony Music; Digital Adventure
- Spinoffs: Popsicle
- Past members: Karam; Injun; Jay; Mika; Hyunmin
- Website: Official Japanese Website -大国男児-

Korean name
- Hangul: 대국남아
- Hanja: 大國男兒
- RR: Daegungnama
- MR: Taegungnama

The Boss (Korean: 대국남아; lit. The Boys of Super Space; Japanese: 大国男児), also known as DGNA, was a South Korean boy band formed in 2010 by Open World Entertainment. The group quietly disbanded with multiple members joining the group ASC2NT in 2024.

All five members of The Boss were formerly members of the generational band Xing with different stage names. After being officially announced on January 28, 2010, The Boss debuted on March 4, 2010, with the song "Admiring Boy" on Mnet M!Countdown.

Starting September 2010, The Boss spent a year promoting their Japanese singles "Love Power", "Love Bingo!", and "Love Parade" as part of their "Love Series" before returning to South Korea to promote "Lady" in October 2011. They have been referred to as "K-pop re-exported from Japan" because they used a "Japan-First, Korea-Later" strategy in their performances.

== History ==
=== Pre-debut and Xing ===
Xing was formed in 2006, the original lineup containing none of the DGNA members. Hyunmin replaced one of the original members, Choi Sung-soo. In early 2008, the three remaining members of Xing were joined by three members of Xing Entertainment's other band, Singing In The Rain, including Mika, as well as Jay, a dancer. After the last member from the original lineup, Kevin, left the band, he was replaced by Karam and Injun. All of the members were replaced to create a 5th generation of Xing, so they signed with Open World Entertainment to create a new boyband.

Originally, The Boss was meant to consist of seven members, including two other members of Xing's fourth generation, Kim Ji-sang and Shin Gwang-chul. However, both chose not to debut with the band for personal reasons.

=== 2010: Debut ===
On March 4, The Boss made their debut performance on M! Countdown with their first song "Admiring Boy" (동경소년).

Their first mini-album Awake was released on June 17 and included the singles "Admiring Boy" and "Shining World" (눈부신 세계), as well as the more recent release of their next promotion, "Stumble Stumble" (비틀비틀).

Beginning on October 4, 2010, The Boss appeared in a live Japanese variety show called Made in BS Japan as Monday's special MCs. Made in BS Japan was a television show that introduced Pan-Asian food, fashion, and history to Japanese viewers. Starting January 2011, following the departure of hosts U-KISS, The Boss became the official MCs of the Wednesday program focused on South Korean entertainment.

=== 2011: Popsicle and Japanese debut ===
In January 2011, they returned to the music scene with a 3-member unit group named Popsicle with members Mika, Karam, and Jay. On January 12, they release their music video "I'll Love You Until It Snows in the Middle of a Summer Day" and made debut performances on Music Bank on January 14 and ended their promotion on January 22 along with the other two members, Hyunmin and Injun. On January 20, The Boss won the Newcomer Award at 20th Seoul Music Awards.

On January 23 they went back to Japan to prepare for their Japanese debut. Their official fan color of pearl terracotta was revealed in February on their official website.

On March 30, The Boss released their first Japanese singles' PV: "Love Power". Their first Japanese single was released on April 13, 2011. They made their debut along with a live event from April 12 to April 17 which took place in Fukuoka, Hyogo, Sapporo, Nagoya and Tokyo. Their debut placed 6th on Oricon Daily Chart and 9th on Oricon Weekly Charts. The single made it to the Oricon Monthly Charts, ranking 30th with 12,136 copies sold. The Boss made new songs for their Japanese debut instead of using translated versions of their Korean releases as other groups did.

On June 15, The Boss released their second Japanese single "Love Bingo!". The "Premium Live & Bingo Event" in Shibuya-AX Tokyo was held on May 21. The members gave their valuable items to five lucky fans. Love Bingo ranked 12th on CD TV's Domestic Charts 2011. The "'Love Bingo!' Live & Love Exchange Event" took place from June 15 to June 19 in Fukuoka, Sapporo, Hyogo, Tokyo and Nagoya.

On September 21, The Boss released their third Japanese single "Love Parade", originally intended as the last of their "Love Series." The single peaked at number 8 on its first week on Oricon Weekly Charts and was also one of their best-performing singles with over 18,000 copies sold on their first week. "Love Parade" also made it to the Oricon Monthly Charts, ranking 26th. The Boss also gathered 30,000 fans for their Love Parade event held in Sapporo, Fukuoka, Nagoya, Osaka, and Kanagawa.

In September, after almost one year in Japan, The Boss returned to South Korea to promote their second single album "Lady". The single contained the ballad title track of the same name, an instrumental version of the song, and "Calling You". On October 30, they released a live version video of "Lady". "Lady" overtook Girls' Generation's The Boys for second in Korean sales in Japan at that time. They wrapped up promotions for "Lady" on November 19 at Live Power Music.

On December 7, The Boss released a new single in their Japanese "Love Series" titled "Love Days". The single reached seventh on Oricon Weekly Charts in its first week with 17,758 copies sold. They also held their live event on December 10 with 10,000 fans. "Love Days" also reached 4th on USEN's K-Pop's Weekly Chart on December 28.

"Love Parade", "Love Days", "Love Bingo!" and "Love Power" were ranked 32nd, 33rd, 38th and 42nd respectively in K-Pop Groups' Japanese Singles Sales Ranking Chart 2011.

=== 2012–2014: Love Letters, On the Way and departure from Open World Entertainment ===
On January 18, 2012, The Boss released their first Japanese album, Love Letters. It sold 14,379 copies and placed seventh on Oricon Weekly Charts. This was followed by the release of their fifth Japanese single "Jumping" on March 28.

In February, they announced their fandom name "Master", meaning that fans are The Boss' owners who have mastered everything about them.

With the arrest of their company's CEO Jang Seok-woo for sexual harassment on April 10 and his subsequent detention in police custody three days later, the group cancelled the planned released of their first Korean album, Shadow. Alongside labelmate X-5, they stopped their activities and performances.

On the March 13, 2013, the group released their second Japanese album, On the Way. The album sold 7,624 units and placed eighth on the Oricon Daily Album Charts and 16th on Oricon Weekly Album Charts. The album featured 12 songs with "Yume Made Ato... (夢まであと・・・)" as their title song.

Breaking their two-year hiatus in Korea, POOM Entertainment stated that The Boss had signed a contract with them and would be releasing an album in November. The music video and digital album for Chapter II were released on November 28, with the physical album released on December 2.

On October 14, 2014, The Boss released the music video for their third single album Rilla Go!.

=== 2015–present: Departure from POOM Entertainment ===
On February 25, 2015, they released their digital single, "Who?". The single was only sold physically at Japanese events and The Boss did not hold promotions for it. After the release, the group went out a few months without activities. Upon the announcement of a new Japanese fanmeeting, it was revealed that The Boss had departed from POOM Entertainment, as the company had gone bankrupt, and rejoined XING Entertainment. During this time, Karam filled a role on the children's Tooniverse show Character Island 3.

After re-signing with XING, they promoted extensively in Japan, holding concerts and fan meetings almost every month.

On March 30, 2016, they released their eighth Japanese single "Oh My Girl!" under Universal Japan. The single placed 12th on the Oricon Daily Charts. The single also included a Japanese version of "Who?". The group promoted the single and shortly after announced a Japanese tour "Are You Ready?", with dates in Tokyo, Shizuoka, Miyagi and Osaka in May. In September, the group held a few concerts calling it "Autumn Carnival!".

Hyunmin left the group in 2017, pursuing a career as an artist.

In 2023, members Karam, Injun and Jay appeared on the variety show Peak Time, but withdrew before the second elimination round following photos of Karam alongside a Japanese AV actor being leaked on various online communities.

== Members ==
=== Former ===
- Mika (미가)
- Hyunmin (현민)
- Karam (가람)
- Injun (인준)
- Jay (제이)

== Filmography ==
Year	Title	Role	Notes	Ref.
2010	Idol League	Themselves	Mika, Hyunmin, Injun, Jay	
2010	Idol United	Themselves	Karam, Hyunmin, Injun	
2011	Made in BS Japan	MCs	Japanese	
2011	100% DGNA	Themselves	Japanese	
2011	Daebak! Daikoku Danji	Themselves	Japanese	
2017	Power Rangers Dino Force Brave	Lee Pureun	Injun	
2023	Peak Time	Contestants	Team 23:00	

== Discography ==
- Love Letters (2012)
- On The Way (2013)

== Awards ==
Year	Award	Category	Result
2011	20th Seoul Music Award	Best Newcomer Award	Won
2011	Hong Kong Asian Pop Music Festival (HKAMF)	Best Stage Performance Award	Won

== Concerts and Events ==
- DGNA First Mini Concert (Haengdang-dong, Seoul; September 11, 2010)
- Open-World Festival (Odaiba Dipa Ariake Concert Hall, Tokyo; November 26, 2011)
- Daikoku Daijin Japan First Live 2012 (Shibuya Public Hall, Tokyo; March 20, 2012)
- Daikoku Daijin Summer Magic Live 2012 (Zepp Tokyo, Tokyo, September 7, 2012; Zepp Namba, Osaka, September 9, 2012)
- Daikoku Daijin Special Live "BLACK&WHITE" (Zepp Tokyo, Tokyo; March 20, 2013)
